= 1994–95 Eintracht Frankfurt season =

Eintracht Frankfurt
1994–95 season
- Chairman: Matthias Ohms
- Manager: Jupp Heynckes (sacked 2 April 1995); Charly Körbel (signed 3 April 1995)
- Bundesliga: 9th
- DFB-Pokal: Second round
- UEFA Cup: Quarterfinals
- Top goalscorer: League: Jay-Jay Okocha and Tony Yeboah (7); All: Tony Yeboah (11)
- Highest home attendance: 58,000 15 April 1995 v Bayern Munich (league)
- Lowest home attendance: 16,000 23 September 1994 v Bayer Uerdingen (league)
- Average home league attendance: 29,882
Home colours	Away colours

The 1994–95 Eintracht Frankfurt season was the 95th season in the club's football history. In 1994–95 the club played in the Bundesliga, the top tier of German football. It was the club's 32nd season in the Bundesliga.

== Friendlies ==
Win Draw Loss

13 July 1994	ESV Blau-Weiß Bremen	0–9	Eintracht Frankfurt	Bremen, Germany
18:30 CEST		(Report)	Dickhaut; Weber; Falkenmayer; Penksa; Furtok	Stadium: Bezirkssportanlage Findorff; Attendance: 1,200

15 July 1994	VfB Oldenburg	0–8	Eintracht Frankfurt	Oldenburg, Germany
		(Report)	Furtok; Yeboah; Binz; Roth; Komljenović; Paßlack; Bommer; Aničić	Attendance: 2,500

16 July 1994	SG Freren	0–8	Eintracht Frankfurt	Freren, Germany
		(Report)	Yeboah 10'; Penksa 17', 55'; Aničić 43'; Hagner 48'; Wolf 53'; Kaymak 60'; Sobotzik 89'	Attendance: 2,200; Referee: Husch

18 July 1994	TuS Wagenfeld	0–12	Eintracht Frankfurt
		(Report)	Yeboah; Legat; Furtok; Falkenmayer; Aničić; Wolf; Penksa; Hagner; Becker	Attendance: 2,000

22 July 1994 Blitz tournament	FC St. Gallen	1–0	Eintracht Frankfurt	Winterthur, Switzerland
	Bouderbala 40'	(Report)

22 July 1994 Blitz tournament	FC Winterthur	0–0 (1–2 p)	Eintracht Frankfurt	Winterthur, Switzerland
		(Report)

24 July 1994	FV 08 Riegelsberg	0–12	Eintracht Frankfurt
		(Report)	Furtok; Okocha; Becker; Yeboah; Bommer; Penksa; Komljenović; Hagner	Attendance: 2,000

26 July 1994	SpVgg Oberrad	1–10	Eintracht Frankfurt
	Goal	(Report)	Hagner; Tskhadadze; Okocha; Becker; Weber; Furtok; Penksa; Paßlack; Aničić	Attendance: 3,000

28 July 1994 Fiat Cup; Semi-Final	Eintracht Frankfurt	1–1 (5–4 p)	PSV	Halle (Saale), Germany
18:30 CEST	Weber	(Report)	Goal	Stadium: Kurt-Wabbel-Stadion; Attendance: 1,500
	Penalties
	Yeboah (penalty scored); Komljenović (penalty scored); Binz (penalty scored); Falkenmayer (penalty scored); Legat (penalty scored); Weber (penalty scored)

29 July 1994 Fiat Cup; Final	Eintracht Frankfurt	2–0	Werder Bremen	Aue, Germany
18:30 CEST	Weber; Yeboah	(Report)		Stadium: Erzgebirgsstadion; Attendance: 9,000

1 August 1994 Fuji-Cup; Semi-Final	Eintracht Frankfurt	1–0	Borussia Dortmund	Münster, Germany
	Yeboah	(Report)		Stadium: Preußenstadion; Attendance: 14,500

4 August 1994 Fuji-Cup; Final	Eintracht Frankfurt	0–0 (4–5 p)	Bayern Munich	Koblenz, Germany
		(Report)		Attendance: 17,000

6 August 1994	Waldhof Mannheim	3–2	Eintracht Frankfurt	Mannheim, Germany
18:00 CEST	Goal	(Report)	Gaudino; Okocha	Attendance: 5,000

9 August 1994	FSV Frankfurt	0–0	Eintracht Frankfurt	Frankfurt, Germany
		(Report)		Stadium: Stadion am Bornheimer Hang; Attendance: 5,000

16 August 1994	FV Eppertshausen	1–17	Eintracht Frankfurt
	Bangnowski		Aničić; Gaudino; Bommer; Okocha; Becker; Hagner; Bindewald; Flick; Sobotzik	Attendance: 3,000

22 January 1995	Newell's Old Boys	1–4	Eintracht Frankfurt	West Palm Beach, United States
	Goal	(Report)	Furtok; Legat; Okocha	Attendance: 2,000

23 January 1995	FC Zürich	0–6	Eintracht Frankfurt	West Palm Beach, United States
		(Report)	Furtok; Doll; Penksa; Wolf

25 January 1995	South Florida XI	0–7	Eintracht Frankfurt	West Palm Beach, United States
		(Report)	Okocha; Weber; Penksa; Sobotzik; Wolf

4 February 1995	1. FC Saarbrücken	1–1	Eintracht Frankfurt	Ensdorf, Germany
	Goal	(Report)	Weber	Attendance: 3,500

6 February 1995	Eintracht Frankfurt	2–1	Karlsruher SC	Frankfurt, Germany
	Doll 34'; Okocha 41'	(Report)	Carl 15'	Stadium: Waldstadion; Attendance: 800; Referee: Wagner

8 February 1995	FC Homburg	2–1	Eintracht Frankfurt
	Goal	(Report)	Doll	Attendance: 1,000

11 February 1995	Neuchâtel Xamax	2–2	Eintracht Frankfurt
	Goal	(Report)	Tskhadadze; Furtok	Attendance: 3,500

22 May 1995	SG Ober-Erlenbach	0–11	Eintracht Frankfurt	Bad Homburg
		(Report)	Roth 8'; Furtok 17'; Bommer 36'; Reis 46'; Sobotzik 50', 82'; Penksa 52'; Becker 56', 86'; Hagner 70'; Legat 83'	Stadium: Wingert-Sportpark; Attendance: 1,200

30 May 1995	SpVgg Hochheim	1–14	Eintracht Frankfurt
	Goal	(Report)	Flick; Legat; Binz; Dickhaut; Furtok; Bommer; Obajdin; Becker; Reis	Attendance: 2,000

1 June 1995	FC Burgsolms	0–11	Eintracht Frankfurt
		(Report)	Obajdin; Legat; Binz; Becker; Okocha; Furtok; Dickhaut; Hagner; Wolf	Attendance: 2,000

5 June 1995	SV Prüm	0–5	Eintracht Frankfurt
		(Report)	Okocha; Komljenović; Falkenmayer; Furtok

18 June 1994	SV Pocking / SVG Ruhstorf	0–12	Eintracht Frankfurt	Pocking
		(Report)	Tskhadadze 15'; Dworschak 20', 34'; Becker 25'; Legat 32', 40', 49', 75', 82', 87'; Aničić 42', 70'	Attendance: 4,000; Referee: Rutsch

<!

== Indoor soccer tournaments ==
=== Frankfurt ===
7 January 1995 First match	Eintracht Frankfurt	5–5	Grasshopper Club Zürich	Frankfurt, Germany
	Bindewald; Wolf; Legat; Penksa; Binz	(Report)	Goal	Stadium: Ballsporthalle Frankfurt

7 January 1995 Second match	Eintracht Frankfurt	2–0	Dynamo Dresden	Frankfurt, Germany
	Becker; Wolf	(Report)		Stadium: Ballsporthalle Frankfurt

8 January 1995 Semi-Final	Eintracht Frankfurt	2–3	SC Freiburg	Frankfurt, Germany
	Sobotzik; Penksa	(Report)	Goal	Stadium: Ballsporthalle Frankfurt

9 January 1993 3rd place playoff	Eintracht Frankfurt	v (4–5 p)	PSV	Frankfurt, Germany
		(Report)		Stadium: Ballsporthalle Frankfurt
	Penalties
	Sobotzik (penalty scored); Wolf (penalty scored); Bindewald (penalty scored); Furtok (penalty scored); Becker (penalty missed); Sobotzik (penalty missed)

=== Stuttgart ===
9 January 1993 First match	VfB Stuttgart	2–2	Eintracht Frankfurt	Stuttgart, Germany
	Goal	(Report)	Hagner; Dickhaut	Stadium: Hanns-Martin-Schleyer-Halle

9 January 1993 Second match	Eintracht Frankfurt	3–1	1. FC Nürnberg	Stuttgart, Germany
	Becker; Furtok; Wolf	(Report)	Goal	Stadium: Hanns-Martin-Schleyer-Halle

=== Berlin ===
13 January 1995 First match	Hertha BSC	5–3	Eintracht Frankfurt	Berlin, Germany
	Goal	(Report)	Goal	Stadium: Deutschlandhalle

13 January 1995 Second match	Dynamo Dresden	2–1	Eintracht Frankfurt	Berlin, Germany
	Goal	(Report)	Goal	Stadium: Deutschlandhalle

13 January 1995 Third match	Werder Bremen	1–2	Eintracht Frankfurt	Berlin, Germany
	Goal	(Report)	Goal	Stadium: Deutschlandhalle

== Competitions ==
Win Draw Loss

=== Bundesliga ===
==== League table ====
Pos	Team	Pld	W	D	L	GF	GA	GD	Pts	Qualification or relegation
7	Bayer Leverkusen	34	13	10	11	62	51	+11	36	Qualification to Intertoto Cup group stage
8	Karlsruher SC	34	11	14	9	51	47	+4	36	Qualification to Intertoto Cup group stage
9	Eintracht Frankfurt	34	12	9	13	41	49	−8	33	Qualification to Intertoto Cup group stage
10	1. FC Köln	34	11	10	13	54	54	0	32	Qualification to Intertoto Cup group stage
11	Schalke 04	34	10	11	13	48	54	−6	31	

Source: www.dfb.de
Rules for classification: 1) points; 2) goal difference; 3) number of goals scored.

==== Results by round ====
Round	1	2	3	4	5	6	7	8	9	10	11	12	13	14	15	16	17	18	19	20	21	22	23	24	25	26	27	28	29	30	31	32	33	34
Ground	H	A	A	H	A	H	A	H	A	H	A	H	A	H	A	H	A	A	H	H	A	H	A	H	A	H	A	H	A	H	A	H	A	H
Result	D	D	L	W	L	L	D	W	D	W	L	W	L	W	L	W	L	L	L	W	D	D	D	L	D	W	W	D	W	L	L	W	L	W
Position	12	11	15	11	12	14	14	12	13	11	12	11	11	11	11	11	11	12	12	12	12	13	12	13	13	13	11	11	11	11	11	11	11	9

Source: kicker.de
A = Away; H = Home; W = Win; D = Draw; L = Loss

==== Matches ====
20 August 1994 1	Eintracht Frankfurt	0–0	1. FC Köln	Frankfurt, Germany
15:30 CEST		(Report)		Stadium: Waldstadion; Attendance: 44,000; Referee: Merk

23 August 1994 2	1. FC Kaiserslautern	1–1	Eintracht Frankfurt	Kaiserslautern, Germany
20:15 CEST	Kuntz 82' (pen.)	(Report)	Yeboah 79'	Stadium: Fritz-Walter-Stadion; Attendance: 37,000; Referee: Osmers

28 August 1994 3	Bayer Leverkusen	4–0	Eintracht Frankfurt	Leverkusen, Germany
18:00 CEST	Schuster 16'; Kirsten 39'; Paulo Sérgio 66'; Völler 90'	(Report)	Tskhadadze (yellow card) 57' (yellow-red card); Weber (yellow card) 87' (yellow-red card)	Stadium: Ulrich-Haberland-Stadion; Attendance: 25,000; Referee: Fröhlich

3 September 1994 4	Eintracht Frankfurt	4–1	Borussia Dortmund	Frankfurt, Germany
15:30 CEST	Yeboah 43' (pen.); Binz 49'; Franck 55' (o.g.); Okocha 86'	(Report)	Chapuisat 32'	Stadium: Waldstadion; Attendance: 47,500; Referee: Steinborn

18 September 1994 5	VfB Stuttgart	4–1	Eintracht Frankfurt	Stuttgart, Germany
18:00 CEST	Fredi Bobic 18'; Dickhaut 25' (o.g.); Čović 82', 87'	(Report)	Dickhaut 40'	Stadium: Gottlieb-Daimler-Stadion; Attendance: 35,000; Referee: Heynemann

23 September 1994 6	Eintracht Frankfurt	0–3	Bayer Uerdingen	Frankfurt, Germany
20:00 CEST		(Report)	Feldhoff 12', 16'; Bittengel 65'	Stadium: Waldstadion; Attendance: 16,000; Referee: Strigel

1 October 1994 7	FC Schalke 04	0–0	Eintracht Frankfurt	Gelsenkirchen, Germany
15:30 CEST		(Report)		Stadium: Parkstadion; Attendance: 33,000; Referee: Malbranc

7 October 1994 8	Eintracht Frankfurt	1–0	Karlsruher SC	Frankfurt, Germany
20:00 CEST	Yeboah 60' (pen.)	(Report)		Stadium: Waldstadion; Attendance: 30,500; Referee: Aust

15 October 1994 9	Bayern Munich	3–3	Eintracht Frankfurt	Munich, Germany
15:30 CEST	Babbel 37'; Ziege 71'; Sutter 83'	(Report)	Dickhaut 5'; Doll 55'; Komljenović 88'	Stadium: Olympiastadion; Attendance: 63,000; Referee: Weber

22 October 1994 10	Eintracht Frankfurt	2–0	Dynamo Dresden	Frankfurt, Germany
15:30 CEST	Furtok 46'; Yeboah 54'	(Report)		Stadium: Waldstadion; Attendance: 23,000; Referee: Jansen

29 October 1994 11	Werder Bremen	2–0	Eintracht Frankfurt	Bremen, Germany
15:30 CEST	Beschastnykh 25', 75'	(Report)		Stadium: Weserstadion; Attendance: 30,500; Referee: Krug

5 November 1994 12	Eintracht Frankfurt	2–1	VfL Bochum	Frankfurt, Germany
15:30 CEST	Yeboah 41', 60'	(Report)	Guðjónsson 80'	Stadium: Waldstadion; Attendance: 20,000; Referee: Fleske

12 November 1994 13	SC Freiburg	2–0	Eintracht Frankfurt	Freiburg
15:30 CEST	Roth 53' (o.g.); Cardoso 75' (pen.)	(Report)		Stadium: Dreisamstadion; Attendance: 18,000; Referee: Fischer

19 November 1994 14	Eintracht Frankfurt	2–1	Borussia Mönchengladbach	Frankfurt, Germany
15:30 CEST	Yeboah 59'; Okocha 83'	(Report)	Herrlich 90'	Stadium: Waldstadion; Attendance: 40,000; Referee: Malbranc

27 November 1994 15	MSV Duisburg	1–0	Eintracht Frankfurt	Duisburg, Germany
18:00 CEST	Hopp 2'	(Report)		Stadium: Wedaustadion; Attendance: 18,000; Referee: Strampe

3 December 1994 16	Eintracht Frankfurt	2–0	Hamburger SV	Frankfurt, Germany
15:30 CEST	Legat 2' (pen.); Furtok 88'	(Report)		Stadium: Waldstadion; Attendance: 28,000; Referee: Krug

10 December 1994 17	TSV 1860 München	2–1	Eintracht Frankfurt	Munich, Germany
15:30 CEST	Dowe 9'; Nowak 50'	(Report)	Legat 90'	Stadium: Grünwalder Stadion; Attendance: 27,000; Referee: Bernhard Zerr

17 February 1995 18	1. FC Köln	3–0	Eintracht Frankfurt	Cologne, Germany
20:00 CEST	Labbadia 2', 60'; Polster 51'	(Report)		Stadium: Müngersdorfer Stadion; Attendance: 26,000; Referee: Albrecht

25 February 1995 19	Eintracht Frankfurt	1–3	1. FC Kaiserslautern	Frankfurt, Germany
15:30 CEST	Roth (yellow card) 19' (yellow-red card); Okocha 48'	(Report)	Marschall 49', 77'; Kuka 85'	Stadium: Waldstadion; Attendance: 24,000; Referee: Kasper

4 March 1995 20	Eintracht Frankfurt	2–0	Bayer Leverkusen	Frankfurt, Germany
15:30 CEST	Dickhaut 60'; Okocha 82'	(Report)		Stadium: Waldstadion; Attendance: 20,000; Referee: Scheuerer

11 March 1995 21	Borussia Dortmund	1–1	Eintracht Frankfurt	Dortmund, Germany
15:30 CEST	Michael Zorc 15'	(Report)	Furtok 6'; Falkenmayer (yellow card) 82' (yellow-red card)	Stadium: Westfalenstadion; Attendance: 43,000; Referee: Merk

18 March 1995 22	Eintracht Frankfurt	2–2	VfB Stuttgart	Frankfurt, Germany
15:30 CEST	Tskhadadze 48'; Weber 60'	(Report)	Schneider 1'; Bobic 69'	Stadium: Waldstadion; Attendance: 21,000; Referee: Casper

24 March 1995 23	Bayer Uerdingen	1–1	Eintracht Frankfurt	Krefeld, Germany
20:00 CEST	Feldhoff 68'	(Report)	Binz 82'	Stadium: Grotenburg-Stadion; Attendance: 11,000; Referee: Steinborn

31 March 1995 24	Eintracht Frankfurt	0–3	FC Schalke 04	Frankfurt, Germany
20:00 CEST		(Report)	Herzog 48'; Látal 58'; Dikhtiar 76'	Stadium: Waldstadion; Attendance: 19,000; Referee: Heynemann

8 April 1995 25	Karlsruher SC	1–1	Eintracht Frankfurt	Karlsruhe, Germany
15:30 CEST	Bilić 31'	(Report)	Aničić 54'	Stadium: Wildparkstadion; Attendance: 26,000; Referee: Georg Dardenne

15 April 1995 26	Eintracht Frankfurt	2–5 (2–0 after protest)	Bayern Munich	Frankfurt, Germany
15:30 CEST	Okocha 14'; Reis 43'	(Report)	Schupp 6'; Witeczek 45'; Ziege 48', 83'; Frey 80'	Stadium: Waldstadion; Attendance: 58,000; Referee: Strigel
Note: The match was evaluated as 2–0 with points and 2–0 goals in favour of Eintracht Frankfurt because Bayern Munich fielded four amateur players, one more than the German FA regulations allowed back then.

22 April 1995 27	Dynamo Dresden	1–2	Eintracht Frankfurt	Dresden, Germany
15:30 CEST	Dittgen 37'; Jeremies (yellow card) 72' (yellow-red card)	(Report)	Binz 79'; Aničić 86'	Stadium: Rudolf-Harbig-Stadion; Attendance: 12,000; Referee: Weber

30 April 1995 28	Eintracht Frankfurt	0–0	Werder Bremen	Frankfurt, Germany
18:00 CEST		(Report)		Stadium: Waldstadion; Attendance: 34,500; Referee: Jansen

6 May 1995 29	VfL Bochum	0–1	Eintracht Frankfurt	Bochum, Germany
15:30 CEST		(Report)	Komljenović 44'; Bommer (yellow card) 70' (yellow-red card)	Stadium: Ruhrstadion; Attendance: 19,000; Referee: Strampe

13 May 1995 30	Eintracht Frankfurt	1–2	SC Freiburg	Frankfurt, Germany
15:30 CEST	Komljenović 5'	(Report)	Cardoso 16'; Köpke 53' (o.g.)	Stadium: Waldstadion; Attendance: 35,000; Referee: Aust

21 May 1995 31	Borussia Mönchengladbach	2–0	Eintracht Frankfurt	Mönchengladbach, Germany
18:00 CEST	Pflipsen 55'; Effenberg 75'	(Report)		Stadium: Bökelbergstadion; Attendance: 32,500; Referee: Fischer

27 May 1995 32	Eintracht Frankfurt	4–1	MSV Duisburg	Frankfurt, Germany
15:30 CEST	Binz 19'; Aničić 32'; Becker 53'; Okocha 90'	(Report)	Löbe 82'	Stadium: Waldstadion; Attendance: 19,000; Referee: Pohlmann

10 June 1995 33	Hamburger SV	3–1	Eintracht Frankfurt	Hamburg, Germany
15:30 CEST	Breitenreiter 62'; Albertz 78'; Mason 85'	(Report)	Aničić 68'	Stadium: Volksparkstadion; Attendance: 18,500; Referee: Werthmann

17 June 1995 34	Eintracht Frankfurt	3–1	TSV 1860 München	Frankfurt, Germany
15:30 CEST	Dowe 10' (o.g.); Okocha 40'; Becker 53'	(Report)	Trares (yellow card) 39' (yellow-red card); Winkler 46'	Stadium: Waldstadion; Attendance: 28,500; Referee: Krug

=== DFB-Pokal ===
13 August 1994 1st Round	Göttingen 05	0–6	Eintracht Frankfurt	Göttingen
15:30 CEST		(Report)	Dickhaut 4'; Yeboah 18'; Furtok 34', 35'; Tskhadadze 85'; Legat 88'	Stadium: Jahnstadion; Attendance: 11,500; Referee: Friedrichs

10 September 1994 2nd Round	Eintracht Frankfurt	0–0 (a.e.t.) (3–4 p)	VfL Wolfsburg	Frankfurt, Germany
15:30 CEST	Weber (red card)	(Report)		Stadium: Waldstadion; Attendance: 5,500; Referee: Werthmann
	Penalties
	Falkenmayer (penalty scored); Legat (penalty scored); Yeboah (penalty scored); Binz (penalty missed); Komljenović (penalty missed)		(penalty scored) Lieberam; (penalty scored) Dammeier; (penalty missed) Probst; (penalty scored) Jensen; (penalty scored) Frąckiewicz

=== UEFA Cup ===
15 September 1994 1st Round	Olimpija Ljubljana	1–1	Eintracht Frankfurt	Ljubljana, Slovenia
20:20 CEST	Šiljak 3'	(Report)	Legat 84'	Stadium: Bežigrad Stadium; Attendance: 3,500; Referee: Meier

27 September 1994 1st Round	Eintracht Frankfurt	2–0	Olimpija Ljubljana	Frankfurt, Germany
17:00 CEST	Dickhaut 9'; Yeboah 85'	(Report)		Stadium: Waldstadion; Attendance: 11,500; Referee: Ashman

19 October 1994 2nd Round	Rapid București	2–1	Eintracht Frankfurt	Bucharest, Romania
	Vlădoiu 67'; Voinea 74'	(Report)	Furtok 64'	Stadium: Stadionul Giulești-Valentin Stănescu; Attendance: 10,000; Referee: Wieser

1 November 1994 2nd Round	Eintracht Frankfurt	5–0	Rapid București	Frankfurt, Germany
20:20 CEST	Bommer 10'; Yeboah 13', 17'; Furtok 65', 67'	(Report)		Stadium: Waldstadion; Attendance: 11,500; Referee: Burge

24 November 1994 3rd Round	Eintracht Frankfurt	1–0	SSC Napoli	Frankfurt, Germany
20:30 CEST	Buso 55' (o.g.)	(Report)	Cannavaro (yellow card) 43' (yellow-red card)	Stadium: Waldstadion; Attendance: 31,000; Referee: Puhl

6 December 1994 3rd Round	SSC Napoli	0–1	Eintracht Frankfurt	Naples, Italy
		(Report)	Falkenmayer 54'	Stadium: Stadio San Paolo; Attendance: 25,000; Referee: Van der Ende

28 February 1995 Quarter-finals	Eintracht Frankfurt	1–1	Juventus	Frankfurt, Germany
17:15 CEST	Furtok 73'	(Report)	Marocchi 36'	Stadium: Waldstadion; Attendance: 47,000; Referee: Mikkelsen

14 March 1995 Quarter-finals	Juventus	3–0	Eintracht Frankfurt	Turin, Italy
	Conte 70'; Ravanelli 86'; Del Piero 90'	(Report)		Stadium: Stadio delle Alpi; Attendance: 17,000; Referee: Díaz Vega

== Squad ==
=== Squad and statistics ===
No.	Pos	Nat	Player	Total		Bundesliga		DFB-Pokal		UEFA Cup	
No.	Pos	Nat	Player	Apps	Goals	Apps	Goals	Apps	Goals	Apps	Goals
	GK	(Germany) GER	Andreas Köpke	44	0	34	0	2	0	8	0
	GK	(North Macedonia) MKD	Oka Nikolov	0	0	0	0	0	0	0	0
	DF	(Germany) GER	Uwe Bindewald	37	0	29	0	1	0	7	0
	DF	(Germany) GER	Manfred Binz	43	4	34	4	2	0	7	0
	DF	(Federal Republic of Yugoslavia) YUG	Slobodan Komljenović	41	3	32	3	2	0	7	0
	DF	(Germany) GER	Dietmar Roth	29	0	22	0	1	0	6	0
	DF	(Germany) GER	Ralf Weber	38	1	29	1	2	0	7	0
	DF	(Georgia (country)) GEO	Kakhaber Tskhadadze	18	2	15	1	2	1	1	0
	MF	(Germany) GER	Rudi Bommer	19	1	14	0	0	0	5	1
	MF	(Germany) GER	Mirko Dickhaut	38	5	29	3	2	1	7	1
	MF	(Germany) GER	Thomas Doll	10	1	10	1	0	0	0	0
	MF	(Germany) GER	Matthias Dworschak	1	0	1	0	0	0	0	0
	MF	(Germany) GER	Ralf Falkenmayer	31	1	24	0	2	0	5	1
	MF	(Germany) GER	Thorsten Flick	11	0	9	0	0	0	2	0
	MF	(Germany) GER	~~Maurizio Gaudino~~	15	0	10	0	2	0	3	0
	MF	(Germany) GER	Matthias Hagner	1	0	1	0	0	0	0	0
	MF	(Germany) GER	Thorsten Legat	31	4	22	2	2	1	7	1
	MF	(Nigeria) NGR	Jay-Jay Okocha	36	7	27	7	2	0	7	0
	MF	(Slovakia) SVK	Marek Penksa	13	0	11	0	2	0	0	0
	MF	(Germany) GER	Thomas Reis	4	1	4	1	0	0	0	0
	MF	(Germany) GER	Timo Reuter	1	0	1	0	0	0	0	0
	FW	(Germany) GER	Michael Aničić	10	4	10	4	0	0	0	0
	FW	(Germany) GER	Matthias Becker	14	2	11	2	0	0	3	0
	FW	(Poland) POL	Jan Furtok	34	9	26	3	1	2	7	4
	FW	(Czech Republic) CZE	Josef Obajdin	3	0	3	0	0	0	0	0
	FW	(Germany) GER	Thomas Sobotzik	3	0	2	0	0	0	1	0
	FW	(Ghana) GHA	~~Tony Yeboah~~	21	11	14	7	2	1	5	3

== Sources ==
- Matheja, Ulrich (2011). Unsere Eintracht - Eintracht Frankfurt - Die Chronik. Die Werkstatt. ISBN 978-3-89533-750-5.
