= 1996–97 Eintracht Frankfurt season =

Eintracht Frankfurt
1996–97 season
- Chairman: Dieter Lindner / Hans-Joachim Otto
- Manager: Dragoslav Stepanović (resigned 7 December 1996); Horst Ehrmantraut (appointed 18 December 1996)
- 2. Bundesliga: 7th
- DFB-Pokal: 2nd Round
- Top goalscorer: League: Maurizio Gaudino (9); All: Maurizio Gaudino (10)
- Highest home attendance: 38,000 1 June 1997 v 1. FC Kaiserslautern (league)
- Lowest home attendance: 11,000 on two occasions (league)
- Average home league attendance: 16,235
Home colours	Away colours

The 1996–97 Eintracht Frankfurt season was the 97th season in the club's football history. In 1996–97 the club played in the 2. Bundesliga, the second tier of German football. It was the club's 1st season in the 2. Bundesliga after being relegated from the Bundesliga for the first time.

== Friendlies ==
Win Draw Loss

19 June 1996	SG Westend Frankfurt	1–5	Eintracht Frankfurt	Frankfurt, Germany
	Wagner 3' (pen.)	(Report)	Güntensperger 13'; König 32'; Flick 55'; Bindewald 56'; Reuter 81'	Stadium: Sportanlage Sondershausenstraße; Attendance: 500

2 July 1996	FC Tirol Innsbruck	4–2	Eintracht Frankfurt	Westendorf, Austria
	Mayrleb 33', 48'; Brzęczek 60'; Hobel 85'	(Report)	Menze 17'; Gaudino 25'	Stadium: Waldstadion; Attendance: 1,600

5 July 1996	FC Linz	2–4	Eintracht Frankfurt	Zirl, Austria
	Popović 3'; Brenner 70'	(Report)	Bommer 41'; Tskhadadze 53'; Becker 80'; König 83'	Attendance: 250

7 July 1996	CSKA Kyiv	1–1	Eintracht Frankfurt	Leogang, Austria
	Patyunin 6'	(Report)	Becker 45'	Attendance: 300

10 July 1996	1. FC Traunstein	0–2	Eintracht Frankfurt	Traunstein, Germany
		(Report)	Ekström 35'; Menze 53'	Attendance: 400

13 July 1996	Dillenburg XI	1–8	Eintracht Frankfurt	Dillenburg, Germany
19:00 CEST	Richter	(Report)	Güntensperger; Gaudino; Beuchel; Becker; Ekström; Reuter	Stadium: Stadion auf der Bleiche; Attendance: 1,500

17 July 1996	Mühlheim XI	1–5	Eintracht Frankfurt
	Estevez 81'	(Report)	Gaudino 27'; Güntensperger 38'; Roth 51'; Becker 54', 60'	Attendance: 2,000

20 July 1996	Hessen Kassel	1–0	Eintracht Frankfurt
15:00 CEST	Melchin 40'	(Report)		Attendance: 2,500

24 July 1996	Germania Schwanheim	0–7	Eintracht Frankfurt
		(Report)	Ekström 2'; Pejović 18'; Flick 36'; Dworschak 64'; Reuter 77'; Bindewald 81'; Becker 87'	Attendance: 2,500; Referee: Wolf

26 July 1996	Eintracht Frankfurt	1–1	Urawa Red Diamonds	Wetzlar, Germany
	Gaudino 32'	(Report)	Hori 53'	Stadium: Stadion Wetzlar; Attendance: 3,000; Referee: Wolf

28 July 1996	FSV Großenhausen	0–5	Eintracht Frankfurt	Linsengericht, Germany
		(Report)	Menze 17', 60'; Güntensperger 26', 71'; Reuter 90'	Attendance: 1,500; Referee: Kolb

3 September 1996	Worms XI	1–6	Eintracht Frankfurt	Worms, Germany
	Sackreuther 70' (pen.)	(Report)	Becker 9', 77'; Rossi 18'; Ekström 31', 40'; Gaudino 37'	Attendance: 1,500; Referee: Weber

18 September 1996	Upper Hesse XI	0–3	Eintracht Frankfurt
		(Report)	Reuter 4'; Pejović 43'; Guht 80'	Attendance: 1,600; Referee: Kristek

25 September 1996	TSV Großen-Linden	0–5	Eintracht Frankfurt	Linden, Germany
		(Report)	Beuchel; Becker; Güntensperger; Gaudino; Bommer	Stadium: Sportplatz Großen-Linden; Attendance: 2,000

26 November 1996	Eintracht Frankfurt	0–5	German Football Association Reserves XI
		(Report)	Goal	Attendance: 3,000

29 January 1997	Eintracht Frankfurt	1–1	SV Wehen	Frankfurt, Germany
	Gaudino 30'	(Report)	Stohn 61'	Stadium: Ancillary pitch at the Waldstadion; Attendance: 100

1 February 1997	Eintracht Frankfurt	0–0	FV Bad Vilbel
		(Report)

2 February 1997	Eintracht Frankfurt	2–1	SV Bernbach	Frankfurt, Germany
	Gaudino 20'; Becker 82' (pen.)	(Report)	Grimm	Stadium: Ancillary pitch at the Waldstadion

5 February 1997	Eintracht Frankfurt	1–0	FC Homburg
	Gaudino 36'	(Report)

8 February 1997	Eintracht Frankfurt	1–1	KFC Uerdingen 05	Chiclana, Spain
	Becker	(Report)	Goal

11 February 1997	Sparta Prague	1–0	Eintracht Frankfurt	Chiclana, Spain
	Goal	(Report)

16 February 1997	SV Raunheim	0–3	Eintracht Frankfurt
		(Report)	Guht; Becker; Komljenović	Attendance: 500

22 April 1997	Eintracht Frankfurt	1–2	Bayern Munich	Frankfurt, Germany
19:30 CEST	Guht	(Report)	Goal	Stadium: Waldstadion; Attendance: 25,000

27 May 1997	Friedberg district XI	1–4	Eintracht Frankfurt	Karben, Germany
	Goal	(Report)	Guht; Zarczynski (guest player); Kistner (guest player)	Attendance: 1,800

6 June 1997	Eintracht Rüsselsheim	0–11	Eintracht Frankfurt	Rüsselsheim
		(Report)	Becker 4' (pen.), 38'; Ekström 19'; Bičanić (guest player) 40', 62', 86'; Glöckner 67'; König 75'; Guht 80'; Nold 83' (o.g.); Greul 90'	Stadium: Stadion am Sommerdamm; Attendance: 1,400; Referee: Reitz

== Indoor soccer tournaments ==
=== Frankfurt ===
4 January 1997 First match	Eintracht Frankfurt	3–1	Brøndby IF	Frankfurt, Germany
	Goal	(Report)	Goal	Stadium: Ballsporthalle; Attendance: 4,000

4 January 1997 Second match	Eintracht Frankfurt	3–1	SC Freiburg	Frankfurt, Germany
	Goal	(Report)	Goal	Stadium: Ballsporthalle; Attendance: 4,000

4 January 1997 Third match	Eintracht Frankfurt	1–2	Arminia Bielefeld	Frankfurt, Germany
	Goal	(Report)	Goal	Stadium: Ballsporthalle; Attendance: 4,000

5 January 1997 Semi-Final	Eintracht Frankfurt	4–0	Eintracht Frankfurt Amateure	Frankfurt, Germany
	Goal	(Report)		Stadium: Ballsporthalle; Attendance: 4,000

5 January 1997 Final	Eintracht Frankfurt	4–1	Arminia Bielefeld	Frankfurt, Germany
	Goal	(Report)	Goal	Stadium: Ballsporthalle; Attendance: 4,000

=== Essen ===
6 January 1997 First match	Bayer Leverkusen	0–1	Eintracht Frankfurt	Essen, Germany
		(Report)	Goal	Stadium: Grugahalle

6 January 1997 Second match	Hamburger SV	1–0	Eintracht Frankfurt	Essen, Germany
	Goal	(Report)		Stadium: Grugahalle

6 January 1997 Third match	FC Schalke 04	1–6	Eintracht Frankfurt	Essen, Germany
	Goal	(Report)	Goal	Stadium: Grugahalle

6 January 1997 Final	VfL Bochum	3–1	Eintracht Frankfurt	Essen, Germany
	Goal	(Report)	Goal	Stadium: Grugahalle

=== Koblenz ===
7 January 1997 First match	TuS Koblenz	3–2	Eintracht Frankfurt	Koblenz, Germany
	König; Janßen; Flick	(Report)	Goal	Stadium: Sporthalle Oberwerth; Attendance: 4,000

7 January 1997 Second match	Eintracht Frankfurt	2–2	1. FC Köln	Koblenz, Germany
	Flick; Guht	(Report)	Goal	Stadium: Sporthalle Oberwerth; Attendance: 4,000

7 January 1997 Semi-Final	Eintracht Frankfurt	2–1	Slavia Prague	Koblenz, Germany
	König; Gaudino	(Report)	Goal	Stadium: Sporthalle Oberwerth; Attendance: 4,000

7 January 1997 Final	Eintracht Frankfurt	4–2	1. FC Köln	Koblenz, Germany
	Pejović; Güntensperger; Guht; Glöckner	(Report)	Goal	Stadium: Sporthalle Oberwerth; Attendance: 4,000

=== Kiel ===
8 January 1997 First match	Werder Bremen	3–0	Eintracht Frankfurt	Kiel, Germany
	Goal	(Report)		Attendance: 7,000

8 January 1997 Second match	Brøndby IF	5–5	Eintracht Frankfurt	Kiel, Germany
	Goal	(Report)	Dickhaut; Guht; Dworschak; Güntensperger	Attendance: 7,000

=== Schwerin ===
9 January 1997 First match	Brøndby IF	0–0	Eintracht Frankfurt	Schwerin, Germany
		(Report)		Stadium: Sport- und Kongresshalle

9 January 1997 Second match	Arminia Bielefeld	1–1	Eintracht Frankfurt	Schwerin, Germany
	Goal	(Report)	Becker	Stadium: Sport- und Kongresshalle

9 January 1997 Semi-Final	Werder Bremen	5–1	Eintracht Frankfurt	Schwerin, Germany
	Goal	(Report)	Becker	Stadium: Sport- und Kongresshalle

9 January 1997 3rd place play-off	Hamburger SV	5–3	Eintracht Frankfurt	Schwerin, Germany
	Goal	(Report)	Goal	Stadium: Sport- und Kongresshalle

=== Hannover ===
13 January 1997 First match	Fortuna Düsseldorf	2–3	Eintracht Frankfurt	Hanover, Germany
	Goal	(Report)	Reuter; Kresović; Dworschak

13 January 1997 Second match	Widzew Łódź	1–2	Eintracht Frankfurt	Hanover, Germany
	Goal	(Report)	Guht; Janßen

13 January 1997 Semi-Final	Hannover 96	2–2 (6–4 p)	Eintracht Frankfurt	Hanover, Germany
	Goal	(Report)	Flick; Güntensperger

13 January 1997 Final	Fortuna Düsseldorf	3–2	Eintracht Frankfurt	Hanover, Germany
	Goal	(Report)	Hubchev; Guht

=== Dortmund ===
17 January 1997 First match	PSV	4–0	Eintracht Frankfurt	Dortmund, Germany
	Goal	(Report)

17 January 1997 Second match	Borussia Dortmund	3–1	Eintracht Frankfurt	Dortmund, Germany
	Goal	(Report)	Guht

18 January 1997 Third match	Bayer Leverkusen	1–5	Eintracht Frankfurt	Dortmund, Germany
	Goal	(Report)	Reuter; Kresović; Flick; Dickhaut (o.g.)

=== Munich ===
25 January 1997 First match	Eintracht Frankfurt	1–1	Werder Bremen	Munich, Germany
	Dickhaut	(Report)	Goal

27 January 1996 Second match	Eintracht Frankfurt	2–2	Fortuna Düsseldorf	Munich, Germany
	Becker; Gaudino	(Report)	Goal

27 January 1996 Third match	FC Bayern München	1–1	Eintracht Frankfurt	Munich, Germany
	Goal	(Report)	Gaudino

== Competitions ==
Win Draw Loss

=== 2. Bundesliga ===
==== League table ====
Pos	Team	Pld	W	D	L	GF	GA	GD	Pts
5	Stuttgarter Kickers	34	14	11	9	38	27	+11	53
6	SpVgg Unterhaching	34	11	16	7	35	29	+6	49
7	Eintracht Frankfurt	34	13	9	12	43	46	−3	48
8	VfB Leipzig	34	12	10	12	53	54	−1	46
9	KFC Uerdingen	34	13	5	16	46	44	+2	44

Source: Bundesliga.de
Rules for classification: 1) points; 2) goal difference; 3) number of goals scored.

==== Results by round ====
Round	1	2	3	4	5	6	7	8	9	10	11	12	13	14	15	16	17	18	19	20	21	22	23	24	25	26	27	28	29	30	31	32	33	34
Ground	A	H	A	H	H	A	H	A	H	A	H	A	H	A	H	A	H	H	A	H	A	A	H	A	H	A	H	A	H	A	H	A	H	A
Result	D	W	W	W	L	L	L	D	L	D	D	W	L	L	W	L	L	W	L	W	D	D	W	D	D	L	W	L	W	W	W	L	D	W
Position	6	6	3	2	3	8	7	9	11	11	13	12	13	13	12	13	15	14	14	13	13	12	9	11	12	13	11	12	10	9	6	7	8	7

Source: kicker.de
A = Away; H = Home; W = Win; D = Draw; L = Loss

==== Matches ====
4 August 1996 1	VfB Lübeck	1–1	Eintracht Frankfurt	Lübeck, Germany
15:00 CEST	Tskhadadze 82' (o.g.)	(Report)	Menze 56'	Stadium: Stadion an der Lohmühle; Attendance: 15,000; Referee: Heynemann

7 August 1996 2	Eintracht Frankfurt	2–1	FSV Zwickau	Frankfurt, Germany
19:30 CEST	Ekström 43'; Gaudino 53'	(Report)	Kunze 12'	Stadium: Waldstadion; Attendance: 19,000; Referee: Buchhart

19 August 1996 3	Waldhof Mannheim	1–2	Eintracht Frankfurt	Mannheim, Germany
19:30 CEST	Hofmann 8'	(Report)	Gaudino 17'; Güntensperger 74'	Stadium: Carl-Benz-Stadion; Attendance: 15,000; Referee: Koop

25 August 1996 4	Eintracht Frankfurt	3–1	Fortuna Köln	Frankfurt, Germany
15:00 CEST	Gaudino 47', 80'; Güntensperger 90'	(Report)	Lottner 78'	Stadium: Waldstadion; Attendance: 28,000; Referee: Hilmes

9 September 1996 5	Eintracht Frankfurt	0–1	SV Meppen	Frankfurt, Germany
19:30 CEST		(Report)	Claaßen 3'; Winter (yellow card) 64' (yellow-red card)	Stadium: Waldstadion; Attendance: 14,500; Referee: Stark

15 September 1996 6	SpVgg Unterhaching	2–1	Eintracht Frankfurt	Unterhaching, Germany
15:00 CEST	Reich 9'; Schmöller 54'	(Report)	Becker 77'; Roth (yellow card) 83' (yellow-red card); Tskhadadze (red card) 85'	Stadium: Sportpark Unterhaching; Attendance: 5,500; Referee: Friedrichs

22 September 1996 7	Eintracht Frankfurt	0–1	Stuttgarter Kickers	Frankfurt, Germany
		(Report)	Sailer 14'	Stadium: Waldstadion; Attendance: 14,000; Referee: Fleischer

30 September 1996 8	FC Carl Zeiss Jena	1–1	Eintracht Frankfurt	Jena, Germany
19:30 CEST	Holetschek 80' (pen.)	(Report)	Guht 27'	Stadium: Ernst-Abbe-Sportfeld; Attendance: 8,000; Referee: Kasper

4 October 1996 9	Eintracht Frankfurt	0–1	KFC Uerdingen 05	Frankfurt, Germany
		(Report)	Wollitz 20'	Stadium: Waldstadion; Attendance: 12,000; Referee: Pohlmann

14 October 1996 10	Mainz 05	2–2	Eintracht Frankfurt	Mainz, Germany
19:30 CEST	Akrapović 55'; Ouakili 61'	(Report)	Ekström 7'; Reuter 77'	Stadium: Stadion am Bruchweg; Attendance: 13,500; Referee: Kemmling

19 October 1996 11	Eintracht Frankfurt	1–1	VfL Wolfsburg	Frankfurt, Germany
	Komljenović 45'	(Report)	Meissner 28'	Stadium: Waldstadion; Attendance: 12,500; Referee: Keßler

28 October 1996 12	Hertha BSC	1–2	Eintracht Frankfurt	Berlin, Germany
	Kruse 23' (pen.)	(Report)	Ekström 47'; Becker 87'	Stadium: Olympiastadion; Attendance: 11,500; Referee: Lange

2 November 1996 13	Eintracht Frankfurt	2–3	VfB Leipzig	Frankfurt, Germany
18:30 CEST	Bommer 13'; Ekström 62'; Reuter (red card) 72'	(Report)	Bindewald 47' (o.g.); Däbritz (yellow card) 76' (yellow-red card); Heidrich 87', 90'	Stadium: Waldstadion; Attendance: 15,500; Referee: Werthmann

17 November 1996 14	FC Gütersloh	3–1	Eintracht Frankfurt	Gütersloh, Germany
	Landgraf 54' van der Ven 64'; Bonan 74'	(Report)	Schur 57'	Stadium: Heidewaldstadion; Attendance: 10,000; Referee: Müller

22 November 1996 15	Eintracht Frankfurt	3–0	Rot-Weiss Essen	Frankfurt, Germany
19:00 CEST	Schur 4'; Bindewald 29'; Ekström 86'	(Report)		Stadium: Waldstadion; Attendance: 12,000; Referee: Weiner

2 December 1996 16	1. FC Kaiserslautern	5–0	Eintracht Frankfurt	Kaiserslautern, Germany
	Kuka 44', 53'; Rische 61', 63'; Franck 90'	(Report)		Stadium: Fritz-Walter-Stadion; Attendance: 38,000; Referee: Hufgard

7 December 1996 17	Eintracht Frankfurt	2–3	VfB Oldenburg	Frankfurt, Germany
	Dickhaut 11'; Hubchev (yellow card) 44' (yellow-red card); Gaudino 56'	(Report)	Tammen 43'; Elberfeld 45'; Goch 86'	Stadium: Waldstadion; Attendance: 11,000; Referee: Prengel

22 February 1997 18	Eintracht Frankfurt	3–0	VfB Lübeck	Frankfurt, Germany
15:00 CEST	Becker 11' (pen.); Güntensperger 25', 56'	(Report)		Stadium: Waldstadion; Attendance: 18,500; Referee: Jansen

2 March 1997 19	FSV Zwickau	1–0	Eintracht Frankfurt	Zwickau, Germany
15:00 CEST	Kirsten 21'	(Report)	Rossi (yellow card) 77' (yellow-red card)	Stadium: Westsachsenstadion; Attendance: 10,500; Referee: Byernetzky

10 March 1997 20	Eintracht Frankfurt	1–0	Waldhof Mannheim	Frankfurt, Germany
19:30 CEST	Güntensperger 50'	(Report)		Stadium: Waldstadion; Attendance: 13,000; Referee: Stark

14 March 1997 21	Fortuna Köln	0–0	Eintracht Frankfurt	Cologne, Germany
		(Report)		Stadium: Südstadion; Attendance: 6,000; Referee: Schütz

23 March 1997 22	SV Meppen	1–1	Eintracht Frankfurt	Meppen, Germany
15:00 CEST	Vorholt 56' (pen.)	(Report)	Marell 50' (o.g.); Bindewald (red card) 64'	Stadium: Emslandstadion; Attendance: 12,000; Referee: Blumenstein

30 March 1997 23	Eintracht Frankfurt	1–0	SpVgg Unterhaching	Frankfurt, Germany
15:30 CEST	Bucher 28' (o.g.)	(Report)		Stadium: Waldstadion; Attendance: 15,000; Referee: Casper

24 April 1997 24	Stuttgarter Kickers	0–0	Eintracht Frankfurt	Stuttgart, Germany
		(Report)		Stadium: Waldau-Stadion; Attendance: 4,500; Referee: Weiner

11 April 1997 25	Eintracht Frankfurt	1–1	FC Carl Zeiss Jena	Frankfurt, Germany
19:30 CEST	Gaudino 86'	(Report)	Zimmermann 62'	Stadium: Waldstadion; Attendance: 14,500; Referee: Gettke

19 April 1997 26	KFC Uerdingen 05	3–0	Eintracht Frankfurt	Krefeld, Germany
	Grammozis 23'; Jüptner 73'; Onderka 88'	(Report)		Stadium: Grotenburg-Stadion; Attendance: 6,000; Referee: Hauer

27 April 1997 27	Eintracht Frankfurt	1–0	Mainz 05	Frankfurt, Germany
19:30 CEST	Neustädter 45' (o.g.)	(Report)		Stadium: Waldstadion; Attendance: 14,500; Referee: Müller

3 May 1997 28	VfL Wolfsburg	4–1	Eintracht Frankfurt	Wolfsburg, Germany
15:30 CEST	Tyszkiewicz 11'; Ballwanz 32'; Dammeier 67' (pen.); Deering 75'	(Report)	Janßen 27'	Stadium: VfL-Stadion am Elsterweg; Attendance: 8,000; Referee: Dehmelt

12 May 1997 29	Eintracht Frankfurt	3–1	Hertha BSC	Frankfurt, Germany
19:30 CEST	Gaudino 18', 52'; Weidemann 80' (o.g.)	(Report)	Kruse 35'	Stadium: Waldstadion; Attendance: 13,000; Referee: Fleischer

17 May 1997 30	VfB Leipzig	2–3	Eintracht Frankfurt	Leipzig, Germany
	Däbritz 21'; Heidrich 87' (pen.)	(Report)	Schur 48'; Güntensperger 71', 82'	Stadium: Bruno-Plache-Stadion; Attendance: 5,500; Referee: Frey

22 May 1997 31	Eintracht Frankfurt	2–0	FC Gütersloh	Frankfurt, Germany
19:00 CEST	Gaudino 44' (pen.); Becker 52'	(Report)		Stadium: Waldstadion; Attendance: 11,000; Referee: Kadach

25 May 1997 32	Rot-Weiss Essen	4–1	Eintracht Frankfurt	Essen, Germany
	Holick 5'; Vier 42', 89' (pen.); Schürmann 71'	(Report)	Becker 16'	Stadium: Georg-Melches-Stadion; Attendance: 4,500; Referee: Schütz

1 June 1997 33	Eintracht Frankfurt	0–0	1. FC Kaiserslautern	Frankfurt, Germany
		(Report)		Stadium: Waldstadion; Attendance: 38,000; Referee: Buchhart

11 June 1997 34	VfB Oldenburg	1–2	Eintracht Frankfurt	Oldenburg, Germany
19:00 CEST	Goch 4'	(Report)	Dickhaut 36'; Weber 45'	Stadium: Marschweg-Stadion; Attendance: 2,500; Referee: Zerr

=== DFB-Pokal ===
11 August 1996 1st Round	Holstein Kiel	2–4	Eintracht Frankfurt
17:30 CEST	Habermann 40'; Bertermann 82'	(Report)	Tskhadadze 11'; Ekström 33'; Gaudino 47'; Güntensperger 90'	Attendance: 4,500; Referee: Byernetzki

31 August 1996 2nd Round	SV Meppen	6–1	Eintracht Frankfurt	Meppen, Germany
15:30 CEST	Ukrow 1'; Helmer 5'; Claaßen 37'; Lau 48'; Bujan 58'; Winter 59'	(Report)	Ekström 17'	Stadium: Emslandstadion; Attendance: 10,000

== Squad ==
=== Squad and statistics ===
No.	Pos	Nat	Player	Total		2. Bundesliga		DFB-Pokal	
No.	Pos	Nat	Player	Apps	Goals	Apps	Goals	Apps	Goals
1	GK	(North Macedonia) MKD	Oka Nikolov	33	0	31	0	2	0
2	DF	(Germany) GER	Uwe Bindewald	32	1	30	1	2	0
3	DF	(Germany) GER	Ralf Weber	2	1	2	1	0	0
4	DF	(Germany) GER	Dietmar Roth	29	0	27	0	2	0
5	DF	(Georgia (country)) GEO	~~Kakhaber Tskhadadze~~	10	1	9	0	1	1
5	DF	(Bulgaria) BUL	Petar Hubchev	12	0	12	0	0	0
6	DF	(Germany) GER	Mirko Dickhaut	33	2	31	2	2	0
7	FW	(Germany) GER	Matthias Becker	30	5	28	5	2	0
8	MF	(Germany) GER	Rudi Bommer	14	1	14	1	0	0
9	FW	(Switzerland) SUI	Urs Güntensperger	31	8	29	7	2	1
10	MF	(Germany) GER	Maurizio Gaudino	34	10	32	9	2	1
11	FW	(Sweden) SWE	Johnny Ekström	20	7	18	5	2	2
12	MF	(Germany) GER	René Beuchel	20	0	19	0	1	0
13	MF	(Germany) GER	Matthias Dworschak	13	0	11	0	2	0
14	DF	(Italy) ITA	Marco Rossi	15	0	14	0	1	0
15	MF	(Germany) GER	Timo Reuter	10	1	8	1	2	0
17	MF	(Germany) GER	Oliver Bunzenthal	5	0	5	0	0	0
18	MF	(Germany) GER	~~Steffen Menze~~	12	1	10	1	2	0
18	DF	(Germany) GER	Alexander Kutschera	15	0	15	0	0	0
19	MF	(Germany) GER	Michael König	2	0	2	0	0	0
20	DF	(Federal Republic of Yugoslavia) YUG	Zvezdan Pejović	16	0	14	0	2	0
21	MF	(Federal Republic of Yugoslavia) YUG	Slobodan Komljenović	28	1	27	1	1	0
22	MF	(Germany) GER	Thorsten Flick	16	0	16	0	0	0
23	GK	(Germany) GER	Sven Schmitt	3	0	3	0	0	0
24	MF	(Germany) GER	Alexander Schur	20	3	20	3	0	0
27	MF	(Germany) GER	Carsten Hennig	3	0	3	0	0	0
29	MF	(Germany) GER	Oscar Corrochano	1	0	1	0	0	0
30	MF	(Germany) GER	Olaf Janßen	7	1	7	1	0	0
31	MF	(Germany) GER	Michael Guht	21	1	21	1	0	0
32	MF	(Germany) GER	Patrick Glöckner	9	0	9	0	0	0

== Sources ==
- Matheja, Ulrich (2011). Unsere Eintracht – Eintracht Frankfurt – Die Chronik. Die Werkstatt. ISBN 978-3-89533-750-5.
