= 1995–96 Eintracht Frankfurt season =

Eintracht Frankfurt
1995-96 season
- Chairman: Matthias Ohms
- Manager: Charly Körbel (resigned 30 March 1996); Dragoslav Stepanović (appointed 1 April 1996)
- Bundesliga: 17th
- DFB-Pokal: Second round
- UEFA Intertoto Cup: Round of 16
- Top goalscorer: League: Matthias Hagner (10); All: Jay-Jay Okocha (11)
- Highest home attendance: 57,500 4 November 1995 v Bayern Munich (league)
- Lowest home attendance: 12,500 16 February 1996 v KFC Uerdingen (league)
- Average home league attendance: 29,800
Home colours	Away colours

The 1995–96 Eintracht Frankfurt season was the 96th season in the club's football history. In 1995–96 the club played in the Bundesliga, the top tier of German football. It was the club's 33rd season in the Bundesliga and ended with the first relegation in club history.

== Friendlies ==
Win Draw Loss

18 July 1995	FC Tirol Innsbruck	2–1	Eintracht Frankfurt
	Goal	(Report)	Becker	Attendance: 3,000

25 July 1995	SpVgg Neu-Isenburg	1–4	Eintracht Frankfurt
	Goal	(Report)	Okocha; Becker; Komljenović	Attendance: 2,000

1 August 1995	1. FC Köln	1–1 (2–3 p)	Eintracht Frankfurt	Kerkrade, Netherlands
	Goal	(Report)	Becker	Attendance: 3,000
	Penalties
			(penalty scored) Schupp; (penalty scored) Okocha; (penalty scored) Aničić

3 August 1995	FC Schalke 04	1–2	Eintracht Frankfurt	Kerkrade, Netherlands
	Weidemann 22'	(Report)	Aničić 15'; Schupp 53' (pen.)	Attendance: 3,000; Referee: Jol

8 August 1995	SV Seulberg	0–23	Eintracht Frankfurt
		(Report)	Rauffmann; Schupp; Gaudino; Komljenović; Binz; Becker; Böhme; Roth; Bindewald; Okocha	Attendance: 1,000

11 September 1995	FSV Steinbach	0–5	Eintracht Frankfurt	Steinbach, Germany
18:30 CEST		(Report)	Hagner 22', 43'; Becker 47'; Corrochano 69'; Chérif Touré 84'	Stadium: Sportzentrum Steinbach; Attendance: 1,500

4 October 1995	Arminia Bielefeld	1–2	Eintracht Frankfurt
	Goal	(Report)	Becker; Ekström

17 January 1996	Eintracht Frankfurt	2–4	FC Homburg
	Doll; Becker	(Report)	Goal	Attendance: 100

23 January 1996	Eintracht Frankfurt	1–4	FSV Mainz 05	Frankfurt, Germany
	Falkenmayer 56' (pen.)	(Report)	Ouakili 13'; Grevelhörster 21', 42'; Ziemer 66'	Stadium: Ancillary pitch at the Waldstadion; Attendance: 250

30 January 1996	Eintracht Frankfurt	1–0	VfL Bochum
	Mornar	(Report)		Attendance: 200

1 February 1996	Eintracht Frankfurt	2–1	Waldhof Mannheim
	Falkenmayer; Becker	(Report)	Goal	Attendance: 500

3 February 1996	Eintracht Frankfurt	3–2	SV Darmstadt 98
	Falkenmayer 15'; Ekström 40'; Okocha 50'	(Report)	Lakies 60'; Krinke 80'	Attendance: 500

21 April 1996	SC 08 Bamberg	0–7	Eintracht Frankfurt	Bamberg, Germany
		(Report)	Tskhadadze 36', 90'; König 37'; Becker 46'; Falkenmayer 67'; Aničić 77'; Reuter 89'	Attendance: 1,300; Referee: Reitzner

20 May 1996	East Offenbach district XI	2–4	Eintracht Frankfurt	Hanau, Germany
	Schrimpf 5'; Hartwig 61'	(Report)	Dickhaut 44'; Okocha 62', 90'; Schupp 74'	Stadium: Alemannia-Sportplatz; Attendance: 1,000; Referee: Hessling

21 May 1996	SV Nieder-Weisel	2–3	Eintracht Frankfurt	Butzbach, Germany
	Weber 40'; Otto 44' (pen.)	(Report)	Roth 11' (o.g.); Schupp 41'; Bindewald 60'	Stadium: Sportanlage Am Wiesengrund; Attendance: 2,000; Referee: Groß

22 May 1996	SC Heiligensee	2–7	Eintracht Frankfurt	Berlin, Germany
18:00 CEST	87'; 88'	(Report)	Doll; Becker; Reuter; Chérif Touré; König; Schupp; Bindewald	Stadium: Stadion Finsterwalder Straße; Attendance: 1,600

23 May 1996	BSV Eintracht Mahlsdorf	0–4	Eintracht Frankfurt	Berlin, Germany
		(Report)	Hagner 25'; Rauffmann; Reuter	Stadium: Stadion Wuhletal; Attendance: 1,500

== Indoor soccer tournaments ==
=== Dortmund ===
27 January 1996 First match	TSV 1860 München	2–1	Eintracht Frankfurt	Dortmund, Germany
		(Report)		Stadium: Westfalenhallen

27 January 1996 Second match	1. FC Kaiserslautern	1–2	Eintracht Frankfurt	Dortmund, Germany
		(Report)		Stadium: Westfalenhallen

27 January 1996 Third match	Karlsruher SC	2–1	Eintracht Frankfurt	Dortmund, Germany
		(Report)		Stadium: Westfalenhallen

== Competitions ==
Win Draw Loss

=== Bundesliga ===
==== League table ====
Pos	Team	Pld	W	D	L	GF	GA	GD	Pts	Qualification or relegation
14	Bayer Leverkusen	34	8	14	12	37	38	−1	38	
15	FC St. Pauli	34	9	11	14	43	51	−8	38	
16	1. FC Kaiserslautern (Note: After being demoted by league place, Kaiserslautern won the DFB-Pokal 1995–96 and thus qualified for the Cup Winners' Cup.) (R)	34	6	18	10	31	37	−6	36	Cup Winners' Cup and relegation to 2. Bundesliga
17	Eintracht Frankfurt (R)	34	7	11	16	43	68	−25	32	Relegation to 2. Bundesliga
18	KFC Uerdingen (R)	34	5	11	18	33	56	−23	26	Relegation to 2. Bundesliga

Source: www.dfb.de
Rules for classification: 1) points; 2) goal difference; 3) number of goals scored.
(R) Relegated

==== Results by round ====
Round	1	2	3	4	5	6	7	8	9	10	11	12	13	14	15	16	17	18	19	20	21	22	23	24	25	26	27	28	29	30	31	32	33	34
Ground	H	A	H	A	H	A	H	A	H	A	A	H	A	H	A	H	A	A	H	A	H	A	H	A	H	A	H	H	A	H	A	H	A	H
Result	D	D	W	L	W	L	L	L	D	L	D	W	D	W	L	W	L	D	W	L	L	D	D	L	L	L	D	L	D	W	L	L	D	L
Position	6	8	5	8	5	9	10	12	12	16	15	12	11	9	9	9	10	10	10	10	13	14	12	14	15	17	16	16	16	16	17	17	17	17

Source: kicker.de
A = Away; H = Home; W = Win; D = Draw; L = Loss

==== Matches ====
12 August 1995 1	Eintracht Frankfurt	2–2	Karlsruher SC	Frankfurt, Germany
15:30 CEST	Rauffmann 43'; Binz 71'	(Report)	Schuster 8'; Knup 47'	Stadium: Waldstadion; Attendance: 24,000; Referee: Jansen

19 August 1995 2	KFC Uerdingen 05	1–1	Eintracht Frankfurt	Krefeld, Germany
15:30 CEST	Peschke 60'	(Report)	Komljenović 24'	Stadium: Grotenburg-Stadion; Attendance: 11,500; Referee: Berg

30 August 1995 3	Eintracht Frankfurt	4–2	TSV 1860 München	Frankfurt, Germany
20:00 CEST	Binz 48'; Okocha 51'; Böhme 62'; Bindewald 89'	(Report)	Borimirov 54'; Leśniak 61'	Stadium: Waldstadion; Attendance: 20,500; Referee: Casper

9 September 1995 4	SC Freiburg	2–0	Eintracht Frankfurt	Freiburg, Germany
15:30 CEST	Todt 10'; Spies 89'	(Report)		Stadium: Dreisamstadion; Attendance: 22,500; Referee: Aust

9 September 1995 5	Eintracht Frankfurt	3–1	1. FC Kaiserslautern	Frankfurt, Germany
15:30 CEST	Hagner 45'; Kadlec 70' (o.g.); Hengen 73'; Okocha 79' (pen.)	(Report)		Stadium: Waldstadion; Attendance: 25,500; Referee: Krug

16 September 1995 6	Bayer Leverkusen	2–0	Eintracht Frankfurt	Leverkusen, Germany
15:30 CEST	Völler 14'; Fach 71'	(Report)		Stadium: Ulrich-Haberland-Stadion; Attendance: 18,000; Referee: Habermann

22 September 1995 7	Eintracht Frankfurt	3–4	Borussia Dortmund	Frankfurt, Germany
20:00 CEST	Schupp 13'; Ekström 35'; Rauffmann 43'	(Report)	Möller 27'; Zorc 37'; Herrlich 46'; Ricken 82'	Stadium: Waldstadion; Attendance: 49,000; Referee: Heynemann

1 October 1995 8	Borussia Mönchengladbach	4–1	Eintracht Frankfurt	Mönchengladbach, Germany
20:00 CEST	Effenberg 21', 60'; Andersson 37'; Dahlin 77'	(Report)	Hagner 6'; Köpke (red card) 53'	Stadium: Bökelbergstadion; Attendance: 28,000; Referee: Pohlmann

14 October 1995 9	Eintracht Frankfurt	2–2	FC St. Pauli	Frankfurt, Germany
15:30 CEST	Böhme (yellow card) 45' (yellow-red card); Okocha 79', 82'	(Report)	Savichev 72', 81'	Stadium: Waldstadion; Attendance: 24,500; Referee: Werthmann

21 October 1995 10	VfB Stuttgart	3–2	Eintracht Frankfurt	Stuttgart, Germany
15:30 CEST	Balakov 42'; Élber 66'; Bobic 83'	(Report)	Hagner 23'; Mornar 88'	Stadium: Gottlieb-Daimler-Stadion; Attendance: 33,000; Referee: Fandel

28 October 1995 11	Hansa Rostock	1–1	Eintracht Frankfurt	Berlin, Germany
15:30 CEST	Klee 75'	(Report)	Okocha 43'	Stadium: Olympiastadion; Attendance: 58,500; Referee: Merk

4 November 1995 12	Eintracht Frankfurt	4–1	Bayern Munich	Frankfurt, Germany
15:30 CEST	Hagner 6', 74'; Mornar 28'; Mornar (red card) 65'; Binz 87'	(Report)	Helmer 51'	Stadium: Waldstadion; Attendance: 57,500; Referee: Aust

11 November 1995 13	Werder Bremen	1–1	Eintracht Frankfurt	Bremen, Germany
15:30 CEST	Bode 45'	(Report)	Hagner 56'	Stadium: Weserstadion; Attendance: 28,000; Referee: Jansen

18 November 1995 14	Eintracht Frankfurt	1–0	1. FC Köln	Frankfurt, Germany
15:30 CEST	Becker 73'	(Report)		Stadium: Waldstadion; Attendance: 27,000; Referee: Strampe

25 November 1995 15	FC Schalke 04	2–0	Eintracht Frankfurt	Gelsenkirchen, Germany
15:30 CEST	Büskens 10'; Mulder 70'	(Report)		Stadium: Parkstadion; Attendance: 33,500; Referee: Koop

2 December 1995 16	Eintracht Frankfurt	3–0	Fortuna Düsseldorf	Frankfurt, Germany
15:30 CEST	Schupp 7'; Okocha 41'; Hagner 42'	(Report)		Stadium: Waldstadion; Attendance: 18,000; Referee: Fleske

8 December 1995 17	Hamburger SV	5–1	Eintracht Frankfurt	Hamburg, Germany
20:00 CEST	Ivanauskas 2'; Bäron 10', 17'; Spörl 31'; Kovačević 77'	(Report)	Doll 75'	Stadium: Volksparkstadion; Attendance: 18,500; Referee: Fleischer

10 February 1996 18	Karlsruher SC	1–1	Eintracht Frankfurt	Karlsruhe, Germany
15:30 CEST	Dickhaut 84' (o.g.)	(Report)	Ritter 12' (o.g.)	Stadium: Wildparkstadion; Attendance: 19,000; Referee: Kemmling

16 February 1996 19	Eintracht Frankfurt	1–0	KFC Uerdingen 05	Frankfurt, Germany
20:00 CEST	Rauffmann 45'	(Report)		Stadium: Waldstadion; Attendance: 12,600; Referee: Kasper

24 February 1996 20	TSV 1860 München	3–1	Eintracht Frankfurt	Munich, Germany
15:30 CEST	Trares 27', 44'; Cerny 86'	(Report)	Hagner 47'	Stadium: Olympiastadion; Attendance: 28,000; Referee: Weber

2 March 1996 21	Eintracht Frankfurt	0–1	SC Freiburg	Frankfurt, Germany
15:30 CEST		(Report)	Rath 79'	Stadium: Waldstadion; Attendance: 21,500; Referee: Buchhart

9 March 1996 22	1. FC Kaiserslautern	1–1	Eintracht Frankfurt	Kaiserslautern, Germany
15:30 CEST	Wagner 48'	(Report)	Schupp 89'	Stadium: Fritz-Walter-Stadion; Attendance: 37,500; Referee: Werthmann

16 March 1996 23	Eintracht Frankfurt	1–1	Bayer Leverkusen	Frankfurt, Germany
15:30 CEST	Doll 89' (pen.)	(Report)	Fach 90'	Stadium: Waldstadion; Attendance: 19,500; Referee: Albrecht

23 March 1996 24	Borussia Dortmund	6–0	Eintracht Frankfurt	Dortmund, Germany
15:30 CEST	Riedle 27', 45'; Zorc 47'; Freund 53'; Heinrich 59'; Chapuisat 66'	(Report)	Schupp (yellow card) 41' (yellow-red card)	Stadium: Westfalenstadion; Attendance: 42,500; Referee: Dardenne

30 March 1996 25	Eintracht Frankfurt	0–2	Borussia Mönchengladbach	Frankfurt, Germany
15:30 CEST		(Report)	Wynhoff 2'; Pettersson 40'	Stadium: Waldstadion; Attendance: 39,500; Referee: Steinborn

6 April 1996 26	FC St. Pauli	2–1	Eintracht Frankfurt	Hamburg, Germany
15:30 CEST	Trulsen 30'; Springer 49'	(Report)	Rauffmann 24'	Stadium: Wilhelm-Koch-Stadion; Attendance: 20,500; Referee: Zerr

9 April 1996 27	Eintracht Frankfurt	2–2	VfB Stuttgart	Frankfurt, Germany
20:00 CEST	Ekström 27'; Okocha 42'	(Report)	Haber 2'; Gilewicz 5'	Stadium: Waldstadion; Attendance: 30,000; Referee: Kasper

12 April 1996 28	Eintracht Frankfurt	1–3	Hansa Rostock	Frankfurt, Germany
20:00 CEST	Dickhaut 40'	(Report)	Akpoborie 9'; Zallmann 46'; Schneider 74'	Stadium: Waldstadion; Attendance: 25,000; Referee: Fleske

20 April 1996 29	Bayern Munich	1–1	Eintracht Frankfurt	Munich, Germany
15:30 CEST	Scholl 48'	(Report)	Hagner 30'	Stadium: Olympiastadion; Attendance: 63,000; Referee: Fröhlich

27 April 1996 30	Eintracht Frankfurt	1–0	Werder Bremen	Frankfurt, Germany
15:30 CEST	Schupp 58'	(Report)		Stadium: Waldstadion; Attendance: 43,000; Referee: Best

1 May 1996 31	1. FC Köln	3–0	Eintracht Frankfurt	Cologne, Germany
15:30 CEST	Kohn 29'; Munteanu 81' (pen.), 87'	(Report)		Stadium: Müngersdorfer Stadion; Attendance: 52,000; Referee: Krug

4 May 1996 32	Eintracht Frankfurt	0–3	FC Schalke 04	Frankfurt, Germany
15:30 CEST		(Report)	Linke 14'; Anderbrügge 69'; Max 80'	Stadium: Waldstadion; Attendance: 42,000; Referee: Berg

11 May 1996 33	Fortuna Düsseldorf	2–2	Eintracht Frankfurt	Düsseldorf, Germany
15:30 CEST	Glavaš 8'; Judt 27'	(Report)	Matthias Dworschak 64'; Ned Zelic 83'	Stadium: Rheinstadion; Attendance: 27,000; Referee: Steinborn

18 May 1996 34	Eintracht Frankfurt	1–4	Hamburger SV	Frankfurt, Germany
15:30 CEST	Hagner 66'; Tskhadadze (yellow card) 75' (yellow-red card)	(Report)	Bäron 8', 77'; Salihamidžić 78', 87'	Stadium: Waldstadion; Attendance: 27,500; Referee: Jansen

=== DFB-Pokal ===
26 August 1995 First round	1. FC Saarbrücken	1–2 (a.e.t.)	Eintracht Frankfurt	Saarbrücken, Germany
19:30 CEST	Flick 89'; Da Palma (red card) 104'	(Report)	Götz 3' (o.g.); Binz 101'	Stadium: Ludwigsparkstadion; Attendance: 6,500; Referee: Leimert

19 September 1995 Second round	TSV 1860 München	5–1	Eintracht Frankfurt	Munich, Germany
15:30 CEST	Winkler 20', 63', 64'; Rydlewicz 23'; Stević 77'	(Report)	Okocha 87'	Stadium: Olympiastadion; Attendance: 11,000; Referee: Best

=== UEFA Intertoto Cup ===
24 June 1995 1	Spartak Plovdiv	0–4	Eintracht Frankfurt
		(Report)	Binz 11'; Legat 14'; Dickhaut 39'; Furtok 76'	Attendance: 3,000; Referee: Hriňák

8 July 1995 2	Eintracht Frankfurt	5–1	Iraklis	Frankfurt, Germany
	Okocha 25', 65', 80'; Binz 44'; Bindewald 54'	(Report)	Papadopoulos	Stadium: Waldstadion; Attendance: 6,500; Referee: Bohuněk

15 July 1995 3	Panerys Vilnius	0–4	Eintracht Frankfurt	Vilnius, Lithuania
		(Report)	Schupp 23'; Rauffmann 27'; Aničić 88'; Bindewald 90'	Stadium: Žalgiris Stadium; Attendance: 500; Referee: Shmolik

22 July 1995 4	Eintracht Frankfurt	1–2	Vorwärts Steyr	Frankfurt, Germany
20:20 CEST	Komljenović 85'	(Report)	Dickhaut 44' (o.g.); Westerthaler 57'	Stadium: Waldstadion; Attendance: 6,000; Referee: Marin

29 July 1995 Round of 16	Girondins de Bordeaux	3–0	Eintracht Frankfurt	Bordeaux, France
20:30 CEST	Lucas 50'; Dutuel 63'; Zidane 85'	(Report)		Stadium: Parc Lescure; Attendance: 11,000; Referee: Shellings

== Squad ==
=== Squad and statistics ===
No.	Pos	Nat	Player	Total		Bundesliga		DFB-Pokal		Intertoto Cup	
No.	Pos	Nat	Player	Apps	Goals	Apps	Goals	Apps	Goals	Apps	Goals
1	GK	(Germany) GER	Andreas Köpke	37	0	32	0	1	0	4	0
2	DF	(Germany) GER	Uwe Bindewald	35	3	29	1	2	0	4	2
3	DF	(Germany) GER	Ralf Weber	4	0	0	0	0	0	4	0
4	DF	(Germany) GER	Dietmar Roth	22	0	18	0	2	0	2	0
5	DF	(Germany) GER	Manfred Binz	31	5	25	3	2	1	4	1
6	FW	(Croatia) CRO	Ivica Mornar	19	2	19	2	0	0	0	0
7	MF	(Germany) GER	Ralf Falkenmayer	14	0	12	0	1	0	1	0
8	MF	(Germany) GER	Markus Schupp	36	5	30	4	2	0	4	1
9	FW	(Germany) GER	Rainer Rauffmann	32	5	26	4	2	0	4	1
10	MF	(Nigeria) NGR	Jay-Jay Okocha	29	11	24	7	1	1	4	3
11	FW	(Sweden) SWE	Johnny Ekström	21	2	16	2	1	0	4	0
12	MF	(Germany) GER	René Beuchel	10	0	7	0	1	0	2	0
13	MF	(Slovakia) SVK	~~Marek Penksa~~	0	0	0	0	0	0	0	0
14	DF	(Germany) GER	Mirko Dickhaut	31	1	28	1	1	0	2	0
15	DF	(Georgia (country)) GEO	Kakhaber Tskhadadze	5	0	3	0	0	0	2	0
16	FW	(Germany) GER	Matthias Becker	26	1	23	1	1	0	2	0
17	MF	(Germany) GER	Oliver Bunzenthal	12	0	12	0	0	0	0	0
18	MF	(Germany) GER	Thorsten Flick	2	0	2	0	0	0	0	0
19	FW	(Germany) GER	Matthias Hagner	28	10	26	10	2	0	0	0
20	MF	(Germany) GER	Thomas Doll	12	1	12	1	0	0	0	0
21	MF	(Federal Republic of Yugoslavia) YUG	Slobodan Komljenović	37	2	31	1	2	0	4	1
22	FW	(Germany) GER	Michael Aničić	16	1	12	0	1	0	3	1
23	MF	(Germany) GER	Jörg Böhme	23	1	18	1	2	0	3	0
24	MF	(Germany) GER	Domenico Sbordone	10	0	7	0	2	0	1	0
25	GK	(North Macedonia) MKD	Oka Nikolov	5	0	4	0	1	0	0	0
28	MF	(Germany) GER	Rudi Bommer	12	0	11	0	1	0	0	0
29	DF	(Turkey) TUR	Burhanettin Kaymak	2	0	2	0	0	0	0	0
30	MF	(Germany) GER	~~Maurizio Gaudino~~	2	0	1	0	0	0	1	0
30	DF	(Australia) AUS	Ned Zelic	17	1	17	1	0	0	0	0
31	MF	(Germany) GER	Matthias Dworschak	7	1	7	1	0	0	0	0

== Sources ==
- Matheja, Ulrich (2011). Unsere Eintracht - Eintracht Frankfurt - Die Chronik. Die Werkstatt. ISBN 978-3-89533-750-5.
