= Jay-Jay Okocha =

Nigerian footballer (born 1973)

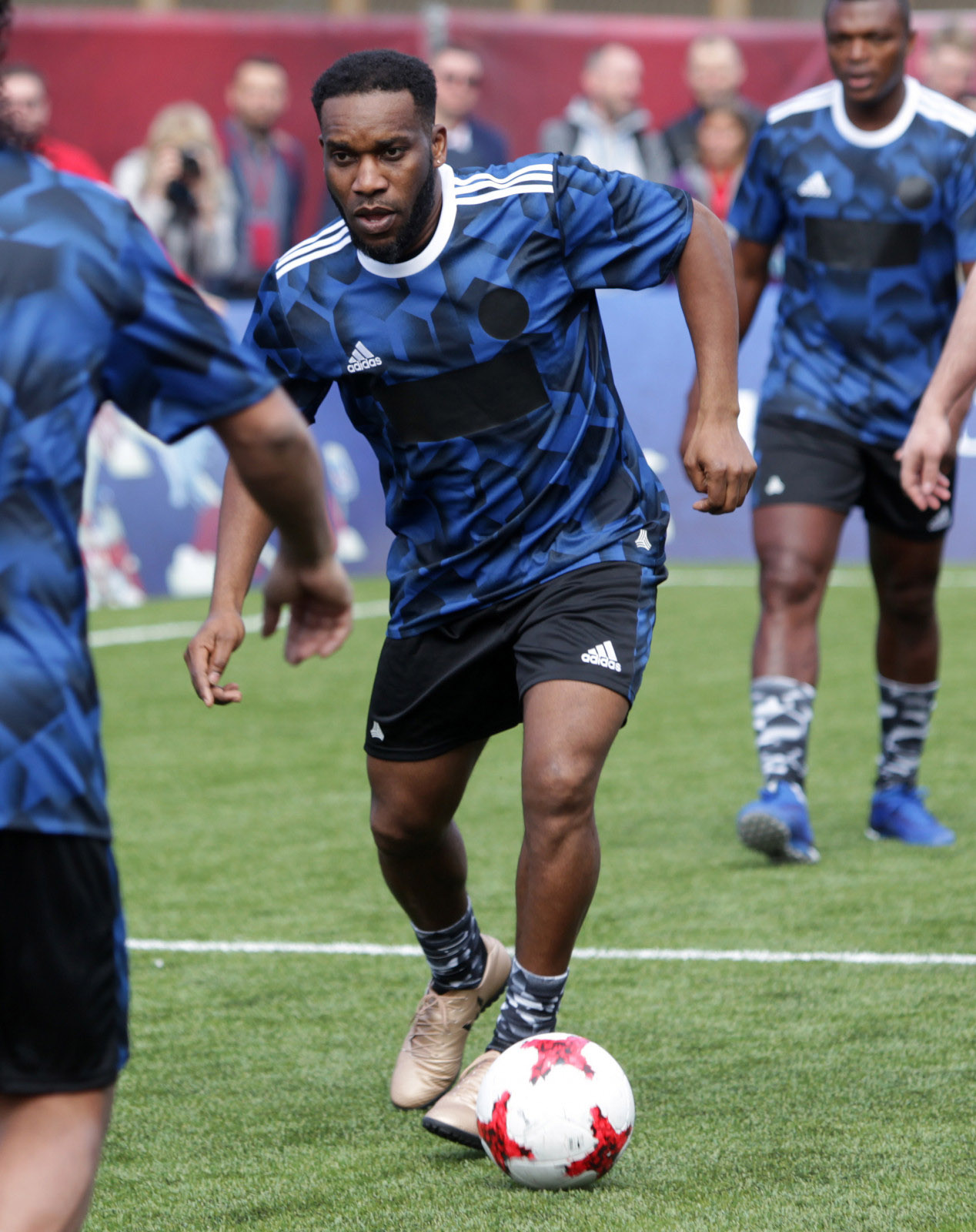
- Okocha in 2017

Personal information
- Full name: Augustine Azuka Okocha
- Date of birth: 14 August 1973 (age 53)
- Place of birth: Enugu, Nigeria
- Height: 1.75 m (5 ft 9 in)
- Position: Attacking midfielder

Youth career
- Enugu Rangers

Senior career*
Years	Team	Apps	(Gls)
1990–1992	Borussia Neunkirchen	35	(7)
1992–1996	Eintracht Frankfurt	90	(18)
1996–1998	Fenerbahçe	62	(30)
1998–2002	Paris Saint-Germain	84	(12)
2002–2006	Bolton Wanderers	124	(14)
2006–2007	Qatar SC	41	(6)
2007–2008	Hull City	18	(0)
2012	Durgapur Vox Champions	0	(0)
Total		454	(87)

International career
1993–2006	Nigeria	73	(14)
Medal record
Men's football
Representing Nigeria
Africa Cup of Nations
Winner	1994 Tunisia
Runner-up	2000 Ghana–Nigeria
Third place	2002 Mali
Third place	2004 Tunisia
Third place	2006 Egypt
Olympic Games
Gold medal – first place	1996 Atlanta
- * Club domestic league appearances and goals

Augustine Azuka "Jay-Jay" Okocha (/əˈkɒtʃə/ ə-KOTCH-ə; born 14 August 1973) is a Nigerian former professional footballer who played as an attacking midfielder. Regarded as one of the greatest African players of all time, Okocha won 73 caps for the Nigeria national team between 1993 and 2006, scoring 14 goals, and was a member of three FIFA World Cup squads. He was known for his ability on the ball, technique, creativity and usage of turns and feints, in particular his version of the stepover (nicknamed the Okocha stepover).

He played across multiple leagues, starting his career at Enugu Rangers in the Nigerian Professional Football League before moving to Borussia Neunkirchen in the Oberliga Südwest, Germany's third division, in July 1990. He played in the Bundesliga, Süper Lig, Ligue 1, Premier League, EFL Championship, and Qatar Stars League before his retirement in 2008.

== Club career ==
Okocha was born in Enugu, Enugu State. The name "Jay-Jay" was passed down from his elder brother James, who started playing football first; his immediate elder brother, Emmanuel was also called Emma Jay-Jay, but the name stuck with him instead. He began playing football on the streets just like many other football stars, usually with a makeshift ball.

In an interview with BBC Sport he said, "As far as I can remember, we used to play with anything, with any round thing we could find, and whenever we managed to get hold of a ball, that was a bonus! I mean it was amazing!" In 1990, he joined Enugu Rangers. In his time at the club he produced many spectacular displays, including one where he rounded off and scored a goal against experienced Nigerian goalkeeper Willy Okpara in a match against BCC Lions of Gboko. Later that year, he went on holiday to West Germany, the country that had just won the 1990 FIFA World Cup, so he could watch German league football. His friend Binebi Numa was playing in the Third Division for Borussia Neunkirchen, and one morning Okocha accompanied Numa to training, where he asked to join in. The Neunkirchen coach was impressed with Okocha's skills and invited him back the next day before offering him a contract. A year later, he joined 1. FC Saarbrücken, but stayed only a few months with the 2. Bundesliga side before a move to the Bundesliga with Eintracht Frankfurt.

=== Eintracht Frankfurt ===
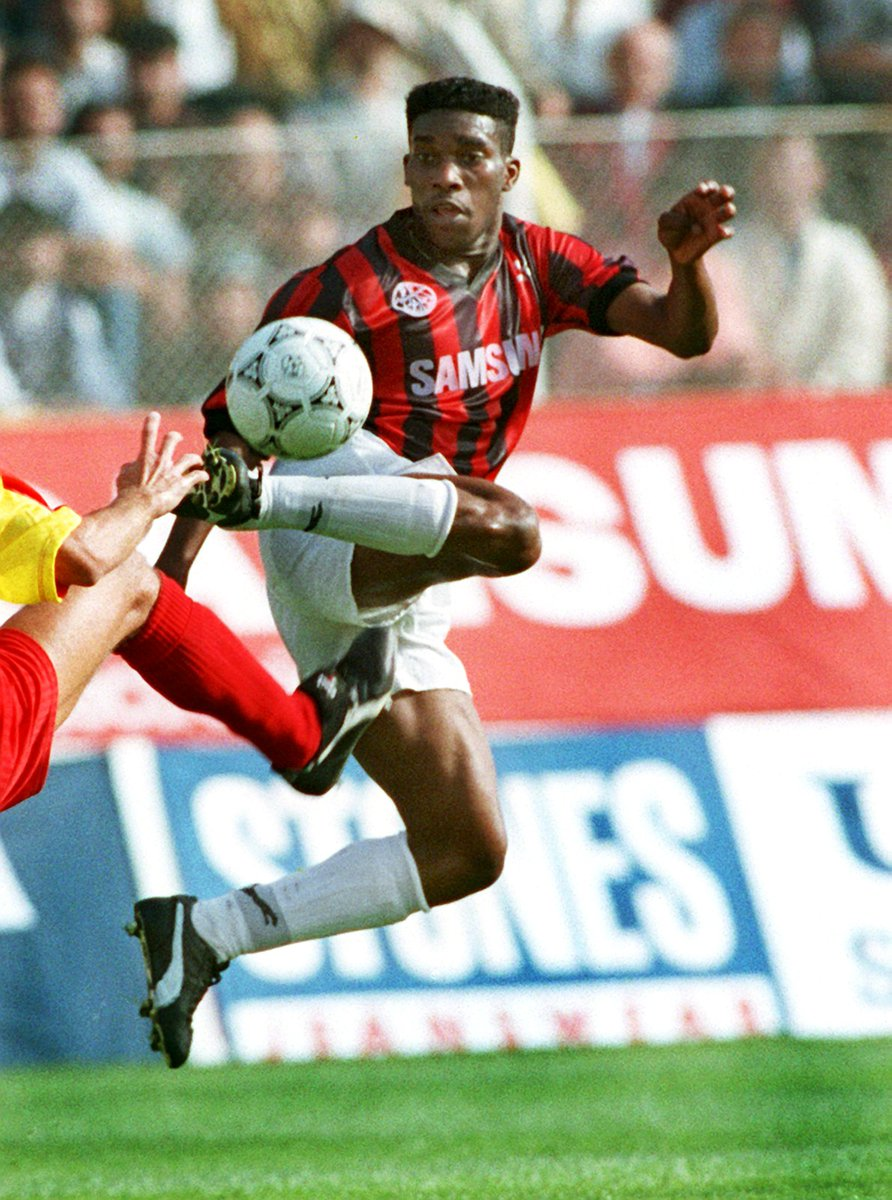
Okocha playing for Eintracht Frankfurt c. 1992

Okocha joined Eintracht Frankfurt in December 1991, where he linked up with many well-known players including Ghanaian international striker Tony Yeboah and later Thomas Doll. He continued to shine for the German side, one highlight being a goal he scored against Karlsruher SC, dribbling in the penalty box, even going past some players twice, and slotting the ball past goalkeeper Oliver Kahn. The goal was voted Goal of the Season by many football magazines, and also voted as the 1993 Goal of the Year by viewers of Sportschau (an ARD German TV sports programme). In 1995, Okocha, Yeboah and Maurizio Gaudino were all involved in a feud with manager Jupp Heynckes, which led to their departure from the club.

Yeboah and Gaudino later left for England, while Okocha stayed until the end of the season when Eintracht were relegated to the 2. Bundesliga, before signing for Süper Lig club Fenerbahçe. In the Bundesliga he scored 18 goals in 90 matches.

=== Fenerbahçe ===
Okocha joined Turkish club Fenerbahçe for approximately £1 million following Eintracht Frankfurt's relegation to the 2. Bundesliga. In his two seasons with the team, he amassed 30 goals in 62 appearances, many of them coming from direct free kicks, which became something of a trademark for him at the club.

Okocha acquired Turkish citizenship during his time at the club and chose the name Muhammed Yavuz while playing. He said that he chose the name Muhammed due to its popularity in Islam, though he did not change his own religion, and the surname Yavuz was a tribute to a staff member he admired.

=== Paris Saint-Germain ===
In 1998, French side Paris Saint-Germain spent around £14 million to sign Okocha, making him the most expensive African player at the time. In his four-year stint with PSG, he played 84 matches and scored 12 goals. He also served as a mentor to young Brazilian footballer and future Ballon d'Or winner Ronaldinho during his time in Paris.

In the 2001 UEFA Intertoto Cup Okocha would go on to score 5 goals and help PSG become joint champions along with Aston Villa F.C. and ES Troyes AC.

=== Bolton Wanderers ===
On 18 June Okocha joined Bolton Wanderers on a free transfer after leaving PSG in the summer of 2002 following the FIFA World Cup. His debut season, despite being hampered by injuries, made him a favourite with the Bolton fans, with the team printing shirts with the inscription "Jay-Jay – so good they named him twice". He steered the team away from relegation with seven goals, including one later voted the team's Goal of the Season in the vital league win against West Ham United. This was also chosen as Bolton's best ever Premier League goal by a fan vote in 2008. The next season saw Okocha receive more responsibility as he was given the captain's armband following Guðni Bergsson's retirement. As captain he led Bolton to the 2004 Football League Cup final, their first cup final in nine years, where they finished runners-up to Middlesbrough.

In 2006, Okocha was stripped of the captaincy—something he said he had seen coming, as there had been a change in attitude from some staff members. This was likely due to his proposed move to the Middle East, which had been the subject of growing speculation. At the end of the season, he refused a one-year extension in order to move to Qatar.

Following Bolton's relegation from the Premier League in 2012, Okocha stated that his spell at the club was now rendered a waste of time, because the club had not invested and improved on the foundations that were laid during his time there.

In 2017, Okocha was voted the best player to have ever played for Bolton Wanderers at the Reebok/Macron Stadium.

=== Hull City ===
After just one season in Qatar, Football League Championship side Hull City signed Okocha on a free transfer in 2007, after the player had been linked to Real Salt Lake and Sydney FC. It was a move he made saying that "God had told him to do so". He was however unable to contribute greatly to Hull's promotion campaign due to fitness and constant injury problems, playing only 18 games and scoring no goals. Hull still succeeded in winning promotion to the Premier League for the first time in their 104-year history. At the end of the season, after changing his mind on a proposed retirement due to Hull's promotion, he was released by the club, which ultimately sent him into retirement.

=== Durgapur Vox Champions ===
In 2012 he came out of retirement and signed with Bengal Premier League Soccer team Durgapur Vox Champions. However, the season was postponed and the league itself folded in 2013 before he was able to make an appearance for the team.

== International career ==
Okocha made his official debut for Nigeria in their 2–1 1994 FIFA World Cup Qualifier away loss against Ivory Coast in May 1993. It was not until his second cap and home debut that he became a favourite with the Nigerian supporters. With Nigeria trailing 1–0 against Algeria, in a match they needed to win, he scored from a direct free kick to equalise, before helping the team to a 4–1 win, eventually securing qualification to their first World Cup. In 1994, he was a member of both the victorious 1994 African Cup of Nations squad and the World Cup squad who made it to the second round before losing a dramatic match against eventual runners-up Italy; during the latter match, he set a World Cup record for most dribbles completed during a single match (15).

In 1996, Okocha became a key member of an arguably more successful Nigerian side, their Olympic gold winning side at the Atlanta Games, later nicknamed the "Dream Team" by the Nigerian press after the USA 1992 Olympics gold winning basketball team, as they overcame Brazil in the semi-finals, before coming back from 2–0 down to 3–2 up against Argentina in the final. At the 1998 FIFA World Cup, Okocha played for a disappointing Super Eagles side who failed to live up to expectations, again reaching the round of 16, albeit with less impressive performances save for their 3–2 opening win against Spain. This did not destroy interest in Okocha, who had entertained fans with his trademark skills and dribbles and went on to be named in the squad of the tournament.

Okocha again joined the Super Eagles in the 2000 African Cup of Nations, which Nigeria co-hosted with Ghana. He scored three goals in the tournament, two in the opening game against Tunisia, and was given a standing ovation by the nearly 60,000 in attendance when he left the field. The Super Eagles then went all the way to the final against Cameroon, with Okocha captaining his side and scoring the equaliser to tie the game 2–2 before losing in the penalty shootout at the end of extra time. He then captained the Super Eagles to the following 2002, 2004 and 2006, consecutively finishing all three tournaments in third place.

He made a return to the Super Eagles for a testimonial against an African select side in Warri. The game featured former players Daniel Amokachi, Alloysius Agu, John Fashanu, Benjani and Sulley Muntari. Nigeria won the match 2–1 with Okocha scoring the winning goal after appearing for the side in the second half. In March 2004, he was named one of the top 125 living footballers by Pelé.

== Style of play ==
"He was just a delightful player to watch. He could do incredible things with the ball and, like Zidane, make it look easy."

— Ruud Gullit on Jay-Jay Okocha

A quick, talented, agile, and skilful playmaker, Okocha usually played as an attacking midfielder, and is widely considered by pundits internationally as the best Nigerian footballer ever, and as one of the best African players of all time. Okocha was known for his confidence and clever trickery with the ball, technique, creativity, flair, close control, and smooth dribbling skills, as well as his turn of pace and his use of feints, in particular his version of the stepover (nicknamed the Okocha stepover) and his trademark turns. In 2012, Allan Jiang of Bleacher Report rated Okocha as the 36th greatest dribbler of all time. Due to his range of passing, Okocha was capable of creating chances for teammates; he was also known for his ability to produce long throw-ins. While not being particularly prolific or consistent in his finishing or goalscoring, Okocha, possessed a powerful shot from long range and was an effective free-kick taker, which saw him score some spectacular and ingenious goals through his career. Due to his skill and nickname, he was described as being 'so good that they named him twice' in a terrace chant while he played for Bolton Wanderers.

Other footballers such as Asamoah Gyan and Mesut Özil have described Okocha as among their footballing heroes. Okocha became known as the "African Maradona" in the media, due to his skill and decisive performances for his country. Despite his ability, however, he was also known for being inconsistent, and for his lack of tactical discipline on the pitch.

== Post-playing career ==
In late 2014, Okocha was added to the FIFA football game series as a "Legend" card.

Okocha was elected as the Chair of the Delta State Football Association on 21 February 2015. In April 2015, he expressed his interest in becoming the president of the Nigeria Football Federation.

On 15 May 2016, Okocha played in a charity match as part of "Team John McGinlay" against "Team Tony Kelly" at the Macron Stadium and scored a hat-trick in his team's 6–2 win.

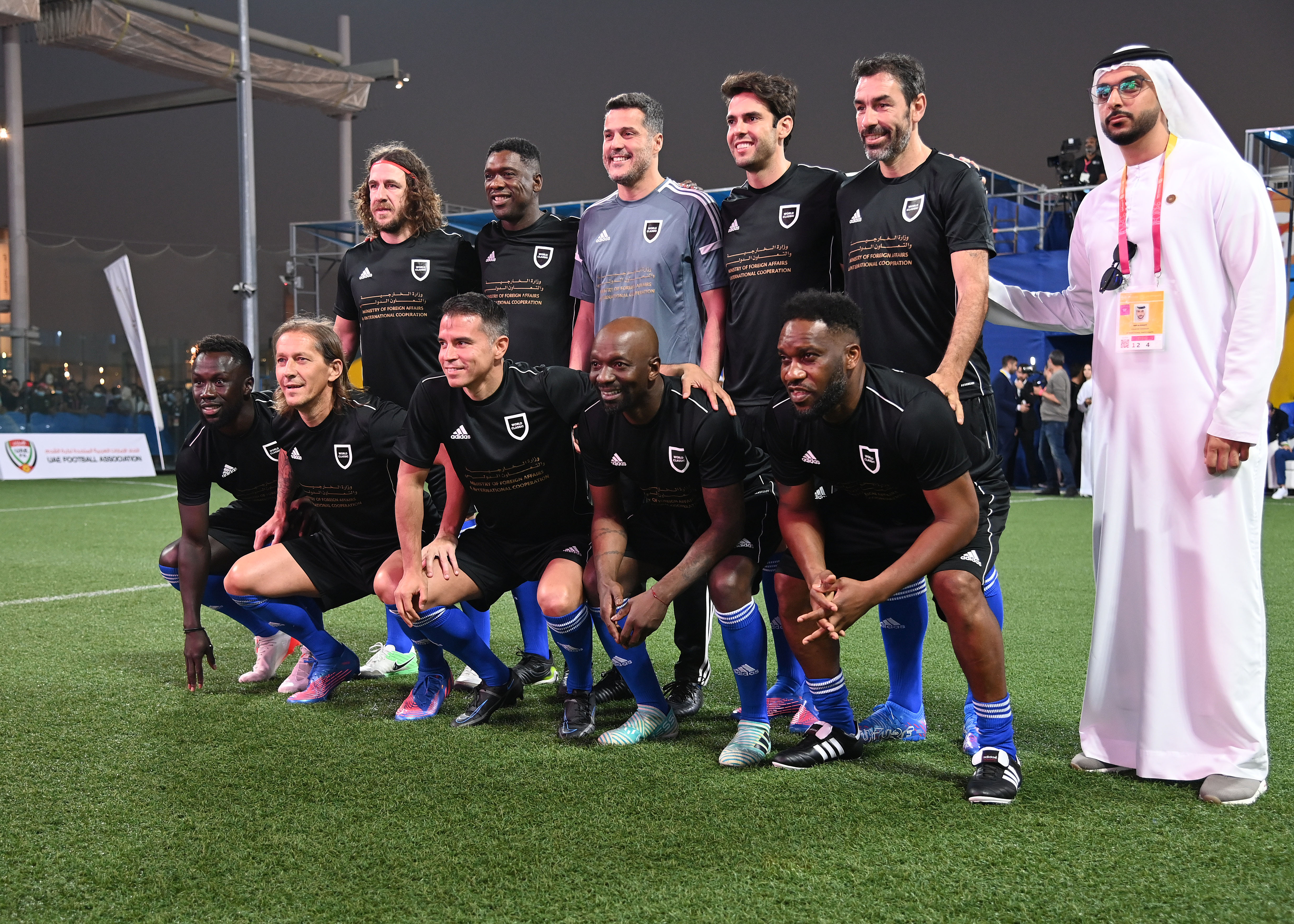
Okocha (first from right, below), alongside Kaká, Seedorf, Puyol, Makélélé, Salgado, Pires and Júlio César, before an exhibition match as part of the Abraham Accords Festival and Games, held at Expo 2020 in Dubai.

In June 2019, it was reported that Okocha had been charged with alleged money laundering in Scotland.

Okocha has served as a football pundit for African sports broadcaster Supersports since 2019, providing analysis for major tournaments, including the African Cup of Nations and the European championships.

On 14 November 2021, Okocha played in a charity match as part of a team of Bolton Wanderers Legends against the current Bolton first team, with the match helping to raise money for the mother of Bolton player Gethin Jones, after she was diagnosed with motor neuron disease. The Bolton first team won 7–4, with Okocha scoring a penalty for the Legends team.

== Personal life ==
Okocha is from Ogwashi Ukwu in Anioma local government of Delta State, a sub-group of the Igbo people. His older brother Emmanuel is also a former footballer who played for the Nigerian national team. He has a nephew, Alex Iwobi, who plays for Fulham and Nigeria.

== Career statistics ==
=== Club ===
Appearances and goals by club, season and competition
Club	Season	League			National Cup		League Cup		Continental		Total	
Club	Season	Division	Apps	Goals	Apps	Goals	Apps	Goals	Apps	Goals	Apps	Goals
Eintracht Frankfurt	1992–93	Bundesliga	20	2	3	1	–		3 (Note: Appearances in UEFA Cup)	0	26	3
Eintracht Frankfurt	1993–94	Bundesliga	19	2	2	0	–		4	2	25	4
Eintracht Frankfurt	1994–95	Bundesliga	27	7	2	0	–		7	0	36	7
Eintracht Frankfurt	1995–96	Bundesliga	24	7	1	1	–		4 (Note: Appearances in UEFA Intertoto Cup)	3	29	11
Eintracht Frankfurt	Total		90	18	8	2	–		18	5	116	25
Fenerbahçe	1996–97	1.Lig	33	16	3	1	1 (Note: Appearance in Turkish Super Cup)	0	8 (Note: Appearances in UEFA Champions League)	1	45	18
Fenerbahçe	1997–98	1.Lig	29	14	0	0	–		2	0	31	14
Fenerbahçe	Total		62	30	3	1	1	0	10	1	76	32
Paris Saint-Germain	1998–99	French Division 1	25	4	0	0	2	0	2 (Note: Appearances in UEFA Cup Winners' Cup)	1	29	5
Paris Saint-Germain	1999–2000	French Division 1	23	2	1	0	3	0	–		26	2
Paris Saint-Germain	2000–01	French Division 1	16	2	1	0	1	0	6	1	24	3
Paris Saint-Germain	2001–02	French Division 1	20	4	2	0	2	1	9 (Note: Six appearances and five goals in UEFA Intertoto Cup, three appearances in UEFA Cup)	5	33	10
Paris Saint-Germain	Total		84	12	4	0	8	1	17	7	112	20
Bolton Wanderers	2002–03	Premier League	31	7	0	0	0	0	–		31	7
Bolton Wanderers	2003–04	Premier League	35	0	0	0	6	3	–		41	3
Bolton Wanderers	2004–05	Premier League	31	6	1	0	1	1	–		33	7
Bolton Wanderers	2005–06	Premier League	27	1	3	0	0	0	7	0	37	1
Bolton Wanderers	Total		124	14	4	0	7	4	7	0	142	18
Hull City	2007–08	Championship	18	0	0	0	1	0	–		19	0
Career total			402	80	19	3	17	5	52	13	489	101

=== International ===
Appearances and goals by national team and year
National team	Year	Apps	Goals
Nigeria	1993	3	1
Nigeria	1994	11	0
Nigeria	1995	5	1
Nigeria	1996	1	0
Nigeria	1997	5	0
Nigeria	1998	5	0
Nigeria	1999	1	0
Nigeria	2000	7	4
Nigeria	2001	8	1
Nigeria	2002	12	1
Nigeria	2003	3	1
Nigeria	2004	8	4
Nigeria	2005	2	1
Nigeria	2006	2	0
Total		73	14

Scores and results list Nigeria's goal tally first, score column indicates score after each Okocha goal.

List of international goals scored by Jay-Jay Okocha
No.	Date	Venue	Opponent	Score	Result	Competition
1	3 July 1993	Lagos, Nigeria	Algeria	1–1	4–1	1994 World Cup qualifier
2	11 June 1995	Boston, United States	United States	1–0	2–3	1995 US Cup
3	23 January 2000	Lagos, Nigeria	Tunisia	1–0	4–2	2000 African Cup of Nations
4	23 January 2000	Lagos, Nigeria	Tunisia	2–1	4–2	2000 African Cup of Nations
5	13 February 2000	Lagos, Nigeria	Cameroon	2–2	2–2	2000 African Cup of Nations
6	17 June 2000	Lagos, Nigeria	Sierra Leone	1–0	2–0	2002 World Cup qualifier
7	1 July 2001	Omdurman, Sudan	Sudan	3–0	4–0	2002 World Cup qualifier
8	26 March 2002	London, England	Paraguay	1–1	1–1	Friendly
9	26 July 2003	Watford, England	Venezuela	1–0	1–0	Friendly
10	31 January 2004	Monastir, Tunisia	South Africa	2–0	4–0	2004 African Cup of Nations
11	8 February 2004	Monastir, Tunisia	Cameroon	1–1	2–1	2004 African Cup of Nations
12	11 February 2004	Tunis, Tunisia	Tunisia	1–0	1–1	2004 African Cup of Nations
13	13 February 2004	Monastir, Tunisia	Mali	1–0	2–1	2004 African Cup of Nations
14	18 June 2005	Kano, Nigeria	Angola	1–0	1–1	2006 World Cup qualifier

== Honours ==
Paris Saint-Germain

- Trophée des Champions: 1998
- UEFA Intertoto Cup: 2001

Bolton Wanderers

- Football League Cup runner-up: 2003–04

Nigeria U23

- Olympic Gold medal: Atlanta 1996

Nigeria

- Africa Cup of Nations: 1994
- Afro-Asian Cup of Nations: 1995

Individual

- Goal of the Year (Germany): 1993
- FIFA World Cup All-Star Team (Reserve): 1998
- Bolton Wanderers Player of the Year: 2002–03
- Premier League Player of the Month: November 2003
- BBC African Footballer of the Year: 2003, 2004
- Africa Cup of Nations Best Player: 2004
- IFFHS All-time Africa Men's Dream Team: 2021
- FIFA 100

== See also ==
- Jay Jay Okocha Stadium
