= Oka Nikolov =

Macedonian footballer (born 1974)

Personal information
- Date of birth: 25 May 1974 (age 52)
- Place of birth: Erbach im Odenwald, West Germany
- Height: 1.88 m (6 ft 2 in)
- Position: Goalkeeper

Team information
- Current team: Los Angeles FC (goalkeeping)

Youth career
- 1981–1989: SG Sandbach
- 1989–1991: Darmstadt 98
- 1991–1993: Eintracht Frankfurt

Senior career*
Years	Team	Apps	(Gls)
1992–1996	Eintracht Frankfurt II	73	(0)
1995–2013	Eintracht Frankfurt	379	(0)
2013	Philadelphia Union	0	(0)
2014	Fort Lauderdale Strikers	8	(0)
Total		460	(0)

International career
1998–2001	Macedonia	5	(0)

Managerial career
- 2014: Germany U-19 (goalkeeping)
- 2015: Macedonia (goalkeeping)
- 2016–2017: Philadelphia Union (assistant)
- 2018: LA Galaxy (assistant)
- 2019–2020: Philadelphia Union (assistant)
- 2021: D.C. United (assistant)
- 2022–: Los Angeles FC (goalkeeping)
- * Club domestic league appearances and goals

Orhej "Oka" Nikolov (German pronunciation: [ˈɔɐ̯hɛɪ ˈʔɔkaː ˈniːkolɔf]; Macedonian: Орхеј "Ока" Николов [ˈɔrxɛj ˈɔka niˈkɔɫɔf]; born 25 May 1974) is a retired professional footballer who played as a goalkeeper. He serves as assistant coach for Los Angeles FC in Major League Soccer. He spent nineteen seasons with Eintracht Frankfurt, appearing in 413 official games over the course of 13 Bundesliga seasons. Born in Germany, he represented Macedonia at international level.

== Club career ==
Born Erbach im Odenwald, Hessen, West Germany, Nikolov grew up in Sandbach in Hessen, starting playing football with local SG Sandbach.

Nikolov started his senior career at Eintracht Frankfurt as backup, first to Uli Stein and then Andreas Köpke. After the latter left the team in June 1996 following the team's relegation from the Bundesliga he became first-choice, losing that status in early 2002 to newly-signed Dirk Heinen; he made his debut in the top division on 9 September 1995, playing the full 90 minutes in a 3–1 home win against 1. FC Kaiserslautern.

In the following years Nikolov played in every season. In February 2007, after Pröll received a rib injury, he was reinstated by manager Friedhelm Funkel, contributing with 20 games during the team's 2006–07 season.

In January 2010, it was announced that the 35-year-old Nikolov would not renew his contract with Eintracht that was due to expire in the summer, but he eventually signed a new deal until 2012, and later until 2013. In June 2013, Eintracht revealed that the goalkeeper's contract would be cancelled, effective immediately to allow Nikolov to fulfill his lifelong dream to play in the United States.

On 19 June 2013, Nikolov signed with the Philadelphia Union of Major League Soccer. He made his first start as a Union player on 30 July 2013 in a friendly against Stoke City playing 45 minutes.

Nikolov signed with Fort Lauderdale Strikers on 19 February 2014 on a contract for the nine-game Spring season. Nikolov started and played eight matches in goal for the Strikers, posting two clean sheets. The team ended up as runners-ups.

== Coaching career ==
- Director of Coaching at JFC Frankfurt
- Project Director and Coach at the Eintracht Frankfurt Football Academy
- Assistant coach for the Germany national under-19 team.
- Nikolov also served as Assistant Coach for the Macedonian National Team as well as a goalkeeper coach for LA Galaxy.

Nikolov joined the coaching staff of Los Angeles FC in February 2022.

== International career ==
Nikolov chose to represent the country of his ancestors, going on to win five caps for Macedonia in four years. He made his debut in a September 1998 friendly match against Egypt but since he also possessed German citizenship he couldn't acquire a Macedonian passport and therefore was unable to play in official games under FIFA. His five appearances were in friendlies.

His final international was a match in November 2001 against Hungary.

== Career statistics ==
=== Club ===
Appearances and goals by club, season and competition
Club	Season	League			National cup		Europe		Total	
Club	Season	Division	Apps	Goals	Apps	Goals	Apps	Goals	Apps	Goals
Eintracht Frankfurt	1993–94	Bundesliga	0	0	0	0	0	0	0	0
Eintracht Frankfurt	1994–95	Bundesliga	0	0	0	0	0	0	0	0
Eintracht Frankfurt	1995–96	Bundesliga	4	0	1	0	1	0	6	0
Eintracht Frankfurt	1996–97	2. Bundesliga	31	0	2	0	—		33	0
Eintracht Frankfurt	1997–98	2. Bundesliga	34	0	3	0	—		37	0
Eintracht Frankfurt	1998–99	Bundesliga	34	0	2	0	—		36	0
Eintracht Frankfurt	1999–2000	Bundesliga	17	0	2	0	—		19	0
Eintracht Frankfurt	2000–01	Bundesliga	4	0	1	0	—		5	0
Eintracht Frankfurt	2001–02	2. Bundesliga	19	0	0	0	—		19	0
Eintracht Frankfurt	2002–03	2. Bundesliga	34	0	2	0	—		36	0
Eintracht Frankfurt	2003–04	Bundesliga	31	0	2	0	—		33	0
Eintracht Frankfurt	2004–05	2. Bundesliga	1	0	0	0	—		1	0
Eintracht Frankfurt	2005–06	Bundesliga	30	0	6	0	—		36	0
Eintracht Frankfurt	2006–07	Bundesliga	20	0	3	0	1	0	24	0
Eintracht Frankfurt	2007–08	Bundesliga	12	0	0	0	—		12	0
Eintracht Frankfurt	2008–09	Bundesliga	18	0	2	0	—		20	0
Eintracht Frankfurt	2009–10	Bundesliga	31	0	3	0	—		34	0
Eintracht Frankfurt	2010–11	Bundesliga	20	0	2	0	—		22	0
Eintracht Frankfurt	2011–12	2. Bundesliga	31	0	2	0	—		33	0
Eintracht Frankfurt	2012–13	Bundesliga	8	0	1	0	—		9	0
Eintracht Frankfurt	Total		379	0	34	0	2	0	415	0
Philadelphia Union	2013	Major League Soccer	0	0	—		—		0	0
Fort Lauderdale Strikers	2014	North American Soccer League	8	0	1	0	—		9	0
Career total			387	0	35	0	2	0	424	0

=== International ===
Appearances and goals by national team and year
National team	Year	Apps	Goals
Macedonia	1998	1	0
Macedonia	2000	3	0
Macedonia	2001	1	0
Total		5	0

== Honours ==
Eintracht Frankfurt

- DFB-Pokal runner-up: 2005–06
