= Nico Däbritz =

German footballer

Personal information
- Date of birth: 26 August 1971 (age 55)
- Place of birth: Freital, East Germany
- Height: 1.80 m (5 ft 11 in)
- Position: Midfielder

Team information
- Current team: Dynamo Dresden (scout)

Youth career
- Stahl Freital
- –1990: Dynamo Dresden

Senior career*
Years	Team	Apps	(Gls)
1990–1991	Dynamo Dresden	1	(0)
1991–1998	VfB Leipzig	188	(12)
1998–2000	VfL Wolfsburg	19	(0)
2000–2002	Hannover 96	20	(3)
2002	SV Babelsberg	10	(0)
2002–2004	Dynamo Dresden	21	(1)
Total		259	(16)

International career
1993	Germany U-21	1	(0)

Managerial career
- 2011–2013: Dynamo Dresden (assistant)
- 2013–2014: Dynamo Dresden (youth)
- * Club domestic league appearances and goals

Nico Däbritz (born 26 August 1971) is a German former footballer who is now youth scout at Dynamo Dresden.

== After retiring ==
After retiring in 2004, Däbritz was hired as scout for Dynamo Dresden. From April 2011 to August 2013, Däbritz was working as assistant manager for Dynamo Dresden's first team.

On 19 August 2013, Däbritz was named as youth coach of the academy in Dynamo Dresden.
