= Piotr Tyszkiewicz =

Polish footballer

Personal information
- Date of birth: 4 September 1970 (age 56)
- Place of birth: Ostróda, Poland
- Height: 1.85 m (6 ft 1 in)
- Position: Forward

Senior career*
Years	Team	Apps	(Gls)
–1989	Stomil Olsztyn		
1989–1990	Zagłębie Lubin	5	(0)
1990–1992	Olimpia Poznań	19	(2)
1992–1994	Sokół Pniewy	16+	(0+)
1994–1995	FC Baden		
1995–1998	VfL Wolfsburg	61	(14)
1998–2000	Eintracht Braunschweig	25	(10)
2000	Lech Poznań		
2001	Stomil Olsztyn	2	(0)
2002	Warmia Grajewo		

Managerial career
- 2002–2003: Stomil Olsztyn
- 2003: Ceramika Opoczno
- 2004–2005: Kujawiak Włocławek
- * Club domestic league appearances and goals

Piotr Tyszkiewicz (born 4 September 1970) is a Polish former professional footballer who played as a forward.

== Post-playing career ==
Tyszkiewicz owned a football school.
