= Matthias Hagner =

German footballer

Personal information
- Full name: Matthias Hagner
- Date of birth: 15 August 1974 (age 52)
- Place of birth: Gießen, West Germany
- Height: 1.86 m (6 ft 1 in)
- Position: Midfielder

Team information
- Current team: VfB Gießen (manager)

Youth career
- –1992: FC Burgsolms

Senior career*
Years	Team	Apps	(Gls)
1992–1996	Eintracht Frankfurt	31	(10)
1996–1998	VfB Stuttgart	53	(10)
1998–2000	Borussia Mönchengladbach	32	(2)
2000–2002	Greuther Fürth	10	(1)
2002–2003	FSV Frankfurt	12	(7)
2003–2006	1. FC Saarbrücken	82	(16)
2006–2009	FSV Frankfurt	64	(7)
Total		284	(53)

International career
	Germany U-21	5	(1)

Managerial career
- 2006–2007: FSV Frankfurt II
- 2014: Sportfreunde Siegen
- * Club domestic league appearances and goals

Matthias Hagner (born 15 August 1974 in Gießen) is a German former professional footballer who played as a midfielder.
