= Süwag Energie ARENA =

Indoor sports arena used also for concerts and performances

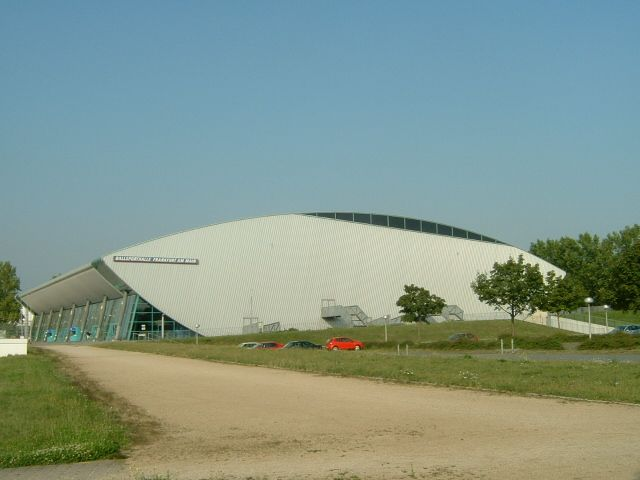
- Interactive map of Süwag Energie ARENA
- Former names: Ballsporthalle Frankfurt (1987–2010)
- Location: Frankfurt, Hesse, Germany
- Coordinates: 50°06′04″N 08°31′38″E
- Owner: City of Frankfurt
- Operator: Sportamt Frankfurt (Main)
- Capacity: Basketball: 5,002
- Public transit: Frankfurt-Höchst (10 min); 54 Silobad/Fraport Arena

Construction
- Built: 1987
- Opened: 1988

Tenant
- Skyliners Frankfurt (Basketball) (1999–present)

Süwag Energie ARENA is an indoor arena that is located in Frankfurt, Germany. It is primarily used to host basketball games, volleyball matches, and indoor football matches. The arena's seating capacity is 5,002 people for basketball games.

== History ==
The arena, which was originally named Ballsporthalle Frankfurt, opened in 1988. It has been the home arena of the German professional basketball club the Fraport Skyliners since 1999. The arena was renamed Fraport Arena, after Frankfurt International Airport obtained its sponsorship naming rights in 2011.

The arena hosts the local annual indoor football tournament, with six teams from the region, such as Eintracht Frankfurt and Kickers Offenbach. The arena hosted the German Davis Cup Team in 2014, 2015, and 2017. It also hosted the German men's national volleyball team, in the FIVB Volleyball World League.

== See also ==
- List of indoor arenas in Germany

Events and tenants
Preceded by Ginásio do Ibirapuera; São Paulo	FIBA Intercontinental Cup; Final Venue; 2016	Succeeded by Pabellón Insular Santiago Martín; San Cristóbal de La Laguna
