= Michael Aničić =

German footballer

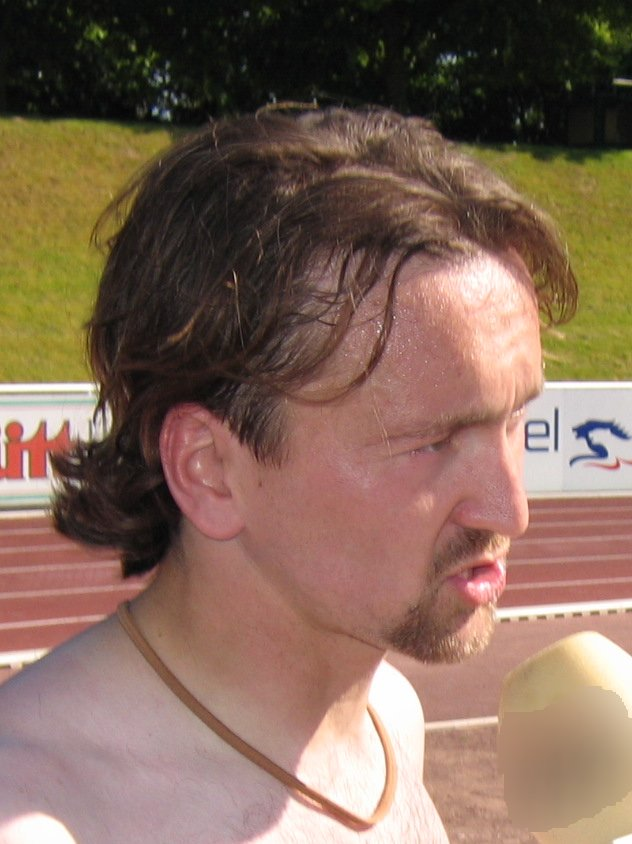
- Aničić in 2004

Personal information
- Full name: Michael Vjekoslav Aničić
- Date of birth: 18 October 1974 (age 52)
- Place of birth: Frankfurt, West Germany
- Height: 1.78 m (5 ft 10 in)
- Position: Midfielder

Youth career
- –1982: SG Westend Frankfurt
- 1982–1992: Eintracht Frankfurt

Senior career*
Years	Team	Apps	(Gls)
1992–1996	Eintracht Frankfurt	35	(5)
1996–1998	Grazer AK	42	(4)
1998–2001	SV Ried	40	(8)
2001–2002	Hapoel Haifa	19	(6)
2002–2003	SC Freiburg	4	(0)
2003–2004	Darmstadt 98	34	(15)
2004	1. FC Eschborn	20	(16)
2005	FSV Frankfurt	8	(4)
2005–2006	Darmstadt 98	9	(2)
2006	1. FC Eschborn	1	(0)
2006	Carl Zeiss Jena	4	(0)
2006–2007	Waldhof Mannheim	12	(3)
2007–2008	Darmstadt 98	30	(6)
2008–2010	Wormatia Worms	19	(5)
Total		277	(74)
- * Club domestic league appearances and goals

Michael Aničić (born 18 October 1974) is a German former professional footballer who played as a midfielder.
