= Oscar Corrochano =

Footballer (born 1976)

Personal information
- Date of birth: 6 September 1976 (age 50)
- Place of birth: Hanau, West Germany
- Height: 1.76 m (5 ft 9 in)
- Position: Midfielder

Youth career
- –1992: VfB 06 Großauheim
- 1992–1995: Eintracht Frankfurt

Senior career*
Years	Team	Apps	(Gls)
1995–1999	Eintracht Frankfurt II	100	(14)
1996–1997	Eintracht Frankfurt	1	(0)
1999–2001	Darmstadt 98	53	(1)
2001–2003	Kickers Offenbach	51	(1)
2003–2004	Eintracht Frankfurt II	20	(1)
2004	Waldhof Mannheim	13	(0)
2004–2006	1. FC Eschborn	17	(1)
2006	SG Bruchköbel	0	(0)
Total		255	(18)

Managerial career
- 2010–2012: Eintracht Frankfurt II
- 2012: Jahn Regensburg
- 2016: Hungary U18
- 2016: Hungary U19
- 2016–2017: Eintracht Trier
- 2017: Sportfreunde Lotte
- 2020–2021: Waldhof Mannheim II
- * Club domestic league appearances and goals

Oscar Corrochano (born 6 September 1976) is a German football coach and former professional player who was most recently serving as assistant coach at SV Sandhausen.

== Coaching career ==
From 2006 to 2012, he was manager of several youth teams of Eintracht Frankfurt. On 15 June 2012, Corrochano was named head coach of SSV Jahn Regensburg in the 2. Bundesliga, but was sacked on 4 November 2012 due to lack of success. On 4 October 2016, he became manager of SV Eintracht Trier. On 15 July 2017, he was appointed as the head coach of Sportfreunde Lotte. He left just 12 days later.

In January 2020, Corrochano joined Waldhof Mannheim II, where he focused on developing young talent and advancing the professionalisation of the club's youth sector. His tenure ended on 28 February 2022, when his contract was terminated for operational reasons.

On 1 August 2022, Corrochano became an assistant coach at Turkish club Gaziantep, working under head coach Erol Bulut, with whom he had previously collaborated at Eintracht Frankfurt.

In late February 2023, Corrochano joined German 2. Bundesliga club SV Sandhausen as assistant coach alongside Gerhard Kleppinger, supporting newly appointed head coach Tomas Oral. Following Oral's dismissal in early April 2023, Kleppinger assumed the role of interim head coach for the remainder of the 2022–23 season, with Corrochano remaining assistant.

== Coaching record ==
As of 14 April 2018.

Team	From	To	Record					Ref.
Team	From	To	G	W	D	L	Win %	Ref.
Eintracht Frankfurt II	1 February 2010	30 June 2012	81	41	13	27	50.62	
Jahn Regensburg	1 July 2012	4 November 2012	13	3	0	10	23.08	
Eintracht Trier	4 October 2016	14 April 2017	22	8	3	11	36.36	
Sportfreunde Lotte	14 July 2017	27 July 2017	1	0	0	1	0.00	
Total			117	52	16	49	44.44	—
