= Thorsten Legat =

German footballer (born 1968)

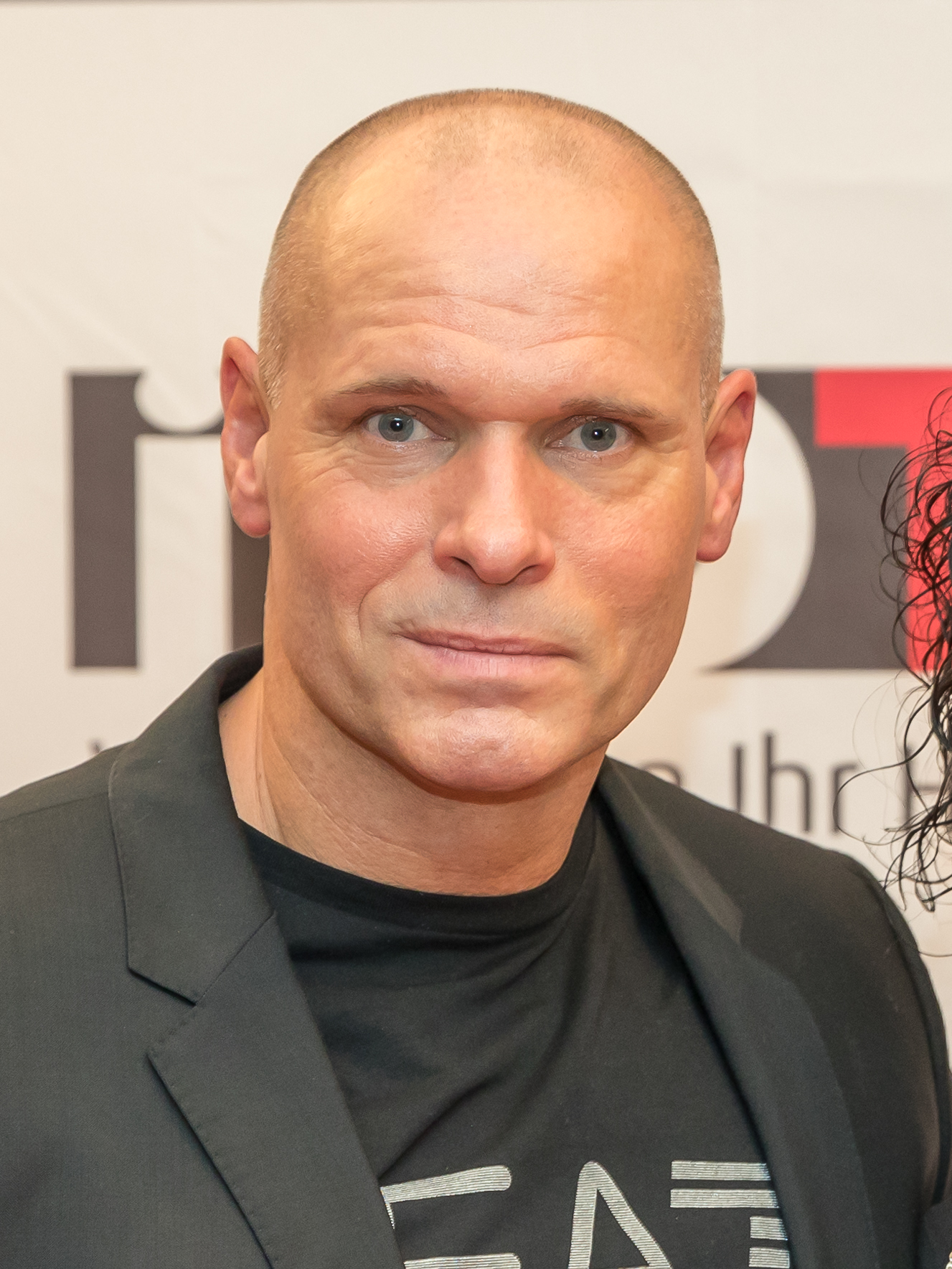
- Legat in 2018

Personal information
- Date of birth: 7 November 1968 (age 58)
- Place of birth: Bochum, West Germany
- Height: 1.85 m (6 ft 1 in)
- Position: Midfielder

Youth career
- –1984: TuS Vorwärts Werne
- 1984–1986: VfL Bochum

Senior career*
Years	Team	Apps	(Gls)
1986–1991	VfL Bochum	107	(9)
1991–1994	Werder Bremen	70	(4)
1994–1995	Eintracht Frankfurt	22	(2)
1995–1999	VfB Stuttgart	40	(0)
2000–2001	Schalke 04	4	(0)
Total		243	(15)

International career
1988	West Germany U21	1	(0)

Managerial career
- 2005–2006: Werder Bremen (youth)
- 2008–2009: TuRa Rüdinghausen
- 2011: Bergisch Gladbach 09 (youth)
- 2012–2013: Wuppertaler SV Borussia (youth)
- 2013–2014: 1. FC Wülfrath
- 2015–2016: FC Remscheid
- 2015–2016: TuS Bövinghausen
- 2026–: FC Germania Mallorca
- * Club domestic league appearances and goals

Thorsten Legat (born 7 November 1968) is a German reality television personality and former professional footballer who played as a midfielder.

He competed in the Bundesliga during his 15-year senior career, amassing totals of 243 games and 15 goals and representing mainly Bochum (five years) and Stuttgart (four).

== Football career ==
Born in Bochum, Legat started playing professionally at hometown's VfL Bochum, making his Bundesliga debut on 6 September 1987 (not yet 19) in a 1–1 home draw against Borussia Mönchengladbach. He became an essential first-team member in the following seasons.

After a spectacular 1990–91 campaign (31 matches, seven goals, being crucial in helping Bochum retain its top division status), Legat signed with SV Werder Bremen. Facing stiffer competition, he still managed to play nearly 100 official games in three seasons and also helped the club win the UEFA Cup Winners' Cup in his debut campaign, although he did not play in the final against AS Monaco FC.

Thorsten Legat’s only official U21 international match took place on April 26, 1988, in Kreuzlingen, where the German U21 national team won a friendly match against Switzerland 8–0.

In 1992, Legat was invited by national team coach Berti Vogts to a scouting training camp for the national team at the Wedau sports school. However, he never made an appearance for the national side.[1]

Legat then spent one season at Eintracht Frankfurt, playing as a defensive complement to Augustine Okocha, and then moved for VfB Stuttgart. With the latter, he began suffering from injuries, undergoing two Achilles tendon surgeries.

Additionally, Legat was involved in a racist incident with Guinean Pablo Thiam, a teammate, in early 1999. He was immediately released, only appearing 40 times in four years combined, and spent two more injury-ravaged years at FC Schalke 04, subsequently retiring.

In 2005–06, Legat spent one year coaching Werder's under-19 side. The following year, he would be involved in another incident, in which he brandished a samurai sword to a group of youngsters after being threatened alongside his wife, slightly hitting one in the head.

== Off the field ==
=== Violence ===
In his time as an active player, Legat's career was overshadowed several times by derailments off the court. So he put a man into the hospital, for example, in New Year's Eve 1996/97 in Bochum after he had threatened him.

In June 2007, Legat made headlines when he fell in the parking lot of a Remscheid fast food chain branch in dispute with a group of young people who allegedly threatened him. As a result, Legat pulled a Samurai sword, which earned him a legal proceeding for attempted dangerous bodily injury. The proceeding was stopped in December 2008 against a payment of an amount of €1,000 to a charitable institution.

=== TV appearances ===
In April 2014, Legat participated in the celebrity cooking show Hell's Kitchen and reached the final. In autumn of the same year, he joined the celebrity boxing event Promiboxen, where he won his fight against the rapper Trooper Da Don. He has participated in several ProSieben events, including TV Total Stock Car Crash Challenge in November 2014 and October 2015 and Die große ProSieben Völkerball Meisterschaft in April 2016.

In January 2016, Legat was candidate in the tenth season of the RTL Television reality game show Ich bin ein Star – Holt mich hier raus! and finished third. In June 2016, he worked together with his wife Alexandra at Das Sommerhaus der Stars – Kampf der Promipaare. In July 2016, he was participant in the summer specials of Grill the Henssler and Ninja Warrior Germany, and in August 2016 he took part in the show Bauer sucht Frau – Die große Bauernolympiade in the team of celebrities. In December 2016, Legat lost his challenge to his competitor Detlef Soost at Schlag den Raab, where he also presented a tattoo translating to "Blood, Honour, Pride & Family", which strongly resembles the Nazi slogan Blood & Honour. In January 2017, he strengthened the "Team Football" at Duell der Stars – Die Sat.1 Promiarena.

=== Private ===
Legat grew up with his three brothers in the parents in Werne, a district of Bochum. In the 1990s, he married Alexandra, with whom he has two sons today. He and his children have been living in Wermelskirchen in Bergisches Land for years.

According to his autobiography Wenn das Leben foul spielt, which was published in 2014, Legat attributes his own outbursts of violence to years of sexual abuse as well as brutal and humiliating attacks by his often-drunk father to both him and the rest of the family during his childhood. The father died in 2005.
