= Uwe Bindewald =

German footballer

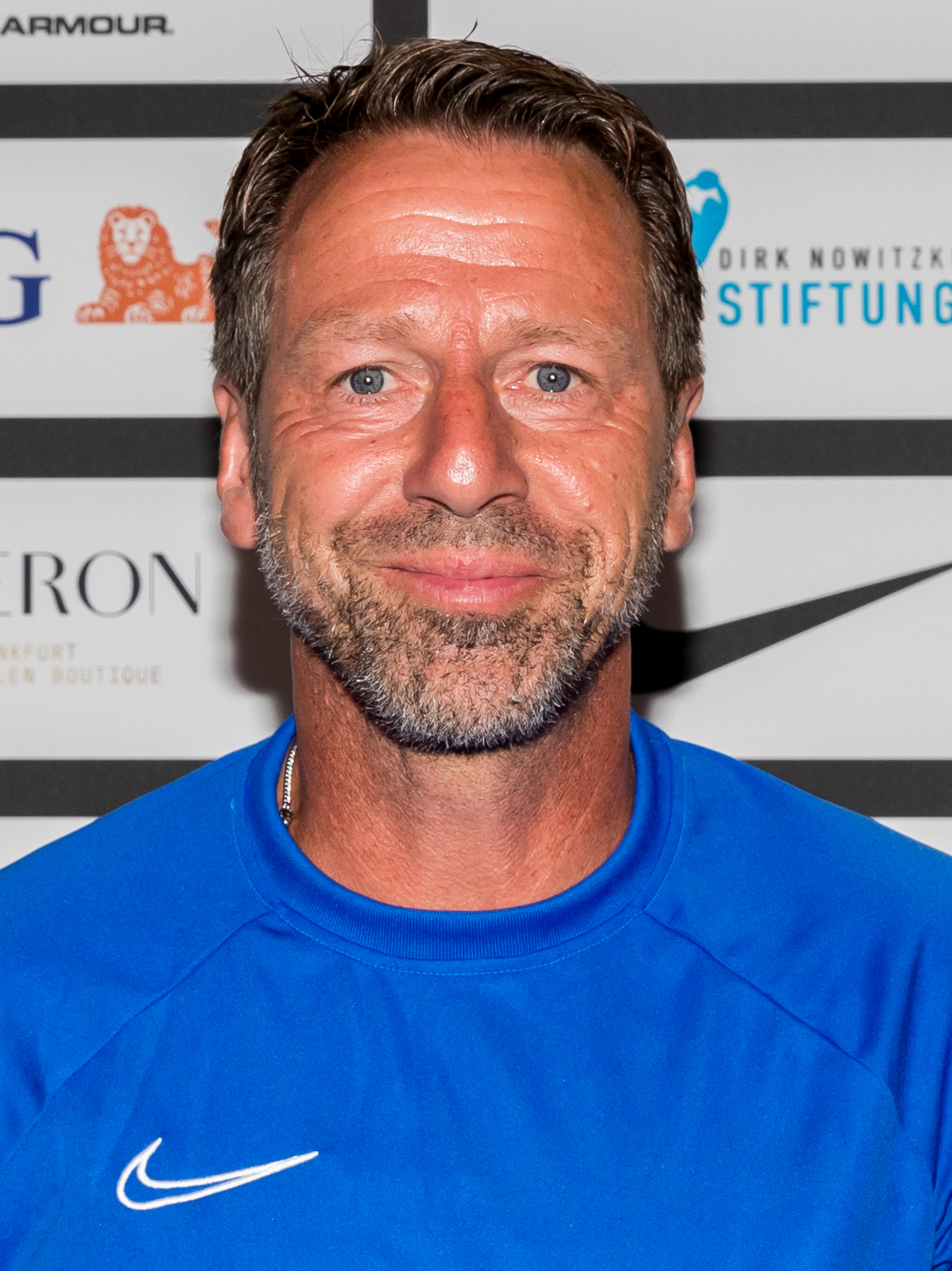
- Bindewald in 2022

Personal information
- Full name: Uwe Bindewald
- Date of birth: 13 August 1968 (age 58)
- Place of birth: Dorheim (Friedberg), West Germany
- Height: 1.80 m (5 ft 11 in)
- Position: Defender

Team information
- Current team: Eintracht Frankfurt (assistant manager U19)

Youth career
- 1975–1982: FSV Dorheim
- 1982–1983: SG Melbach-Södel
- 1983–1986: Kickers Offenbach
- 1986–1988: Eintracht Frankfurt

Senior career*
Years	Team	Apps	(Gls)
1988–2004	Eintracht Frankfurt	386	(6)
2004–2005	1. FC Eschborn	32	(0)
Total		418	(6)

Managerial career
- 2007–2008: Eintracht Frankfurt U19 (assistant)
- 2010–2011: Eintracht Frankfurt II (assistant)
- 2011–2015: Eintracht Frankfurt U17
- 2015–: Eintracht Frankfurt U19 (assistant)
- * Club domestic league appearances and goals

Uwe "Zico" Bindewald (born 13 August 1968) is a German former professional footballer who played as a defender. He works now as assistant manager of Eintracht Frankfurt's U19 team.

== Career ==
Bindewald's footballing career began at FSV Dorheim. Other early clubs included SG Melbach-Södel and Kickers Offenbach before he moved in 1986 to Eintracht Frankfurt. After he failed to receive a new contract for the Frankfurt side in 2004, he moved to 1. FC Eschborn. He finished his playing career after the 2004–05 season.

In spite of his role as a defender, Bindewald is regarded a very fair player, having only received one red card in the entirety of his career. In total he played 263 games in the Bundesliga and 123 in the 2. Bundesliga.

In 2008, he worked as assistant manager of Eintracht Frankfurt's Under 19 team, but he decided not to prolong his contract after five months due to financial reasons. In summer 2010, he started working again as assistant manager, this time for Eintracht Frankfurt's Under 23 team.

Despite his long career and regarded as a reliable defender Bindewald never was capped for the Germany national team.
