= Matthias Becker =

German footballer (born 1974)

Personal information
- Date of birth: 19 April 1974 (age 52)
- Place of birth: Frankfurt, West Germany
- Position: Forward

Youth career
- –1987: DJK Zeilsheim
- 1987–1993: Eintracht Frankfurt

Senior career*
Years	Team	Apps	(Gls)
1993–1997	Eintracht Frankfurt	65	(9)
1997–1998	VfB Stuttgart	8	(0)
1998–1999	Hannover 96	5	(0)
1999–2002	Kickers Offenbach	59	(4)
Total		137	(13)
Medal record
VfB Stuttgart
Runner-up	DFB Liga-Pokal	1997
Runner-up	UEFA Cup Winners' Cup	1998
- * Club domestic league appearances and goals

Matthias Becker (born 19 April 1974 in Frankfurt am Main) is a German former professional footballer who played as a forward.
