= Mirko Dickhaut =

German footballer (born 1971)

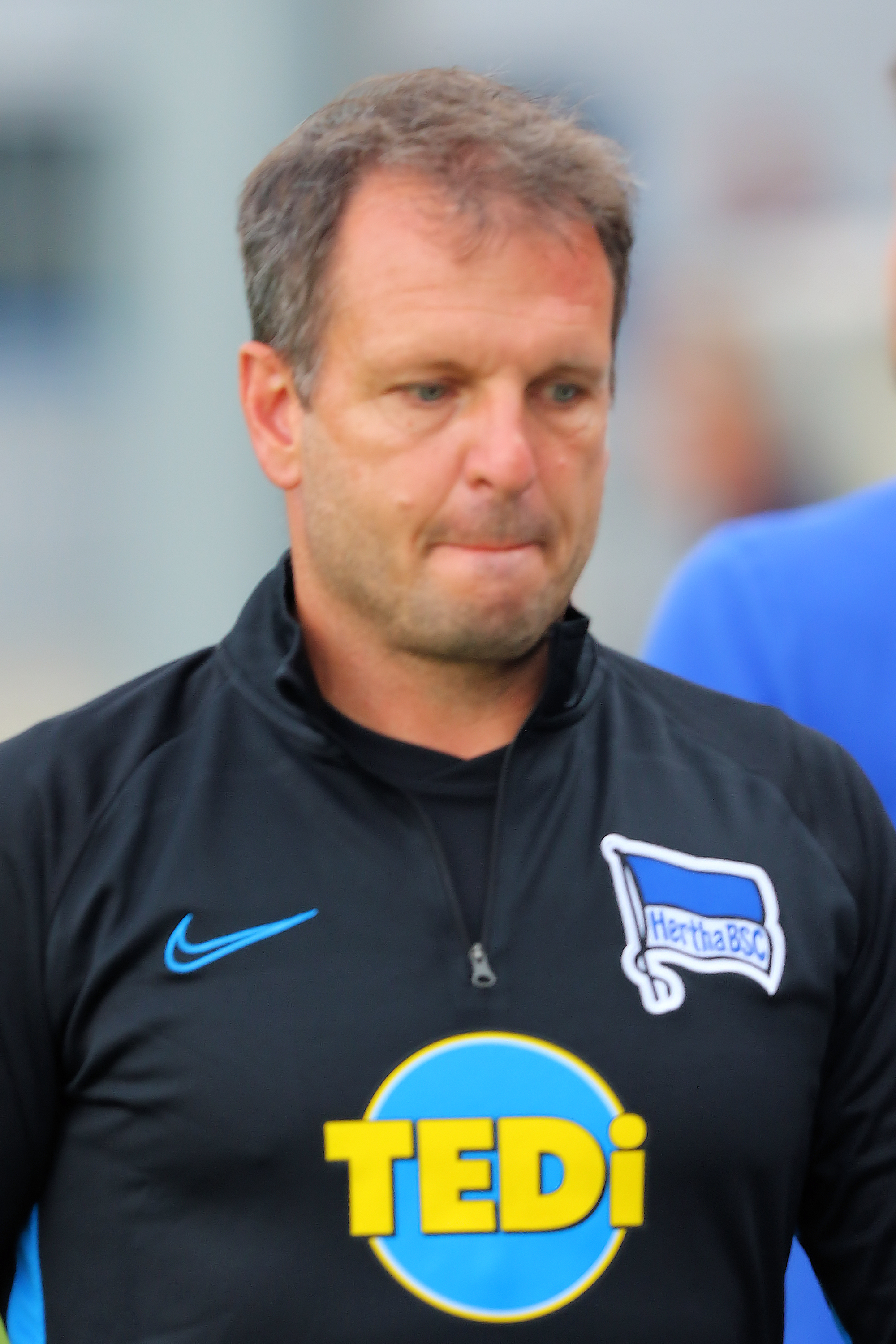
- Dickhaut in 2019

Personal information
- Date of birth: 11 January 1971 (age 55)
- Place of birth: Kassel, West Germany
- Height: 1.76 m (5 ft 9 in)
- Positions: Defender; midfielder

Youth career
- Hessen Kassel
- –1989: KSV Baunatal

Senior career*
Years	Team	Apps	(Gls)
1989–1992	KSV Baunatal		
1992–1993	Hessen Kassel	30	(4)
1993–1997	Eintracht Frankfurt	120	(9)
1997–2002	VfL Bochum	111	(5)
2002	→ VfL Bochum II	1	(0)
2003–2005	SC Bregenz	52	(0)
2005–2008	Hessen Kassel	30	(2)

Managerial career
- 2007–2008: Hessen Kassel II
- 2008–2011: Hessen Kassel
- 2012–2013: Hessen Kassel II
- 2015–2016: SC Paderborn II
- 2017: Greuther Fürth (interim)
- * Club domestic league appearances and goals

Mirko Dickhaut (born 11 January 1971) is a German football coach and a former player.

== Career statistics ==
Appearances and goals by club, season and competition
Club	Season	League			National cup		League cup		Continental		Total	
Club	Season	Division	Apps	Goals	Apps	Goals	Apps	Goals	Apps	Goals	Apps	Goals
KSV Baunatal	1989–90	Oberliga Hessen			—		—		—			
KSV Baunatal	1990–91	Oberliga Hessen			—		—		—			
KSV Baunatal	1991–92	Landesliga Hessen			—		—		—			
KSV Baunatal	Total											
Hessen Kassel	1992–93	Oberliga	30	4	—		—		—		30	4
Eintracht Frankfurt	1993–94	Bundesliga	32	3	0	0	—		6	1	38	4
Eintracht Frankfurt	1994–95	Bundesliga	29	3	2	1	—		7	1	38	5
Eintracht Frankfurt	1995–96	Bundesliga	28	1	1	0	—				29	1
Eintracht Frankfurt	1996–97	2. Bundesliga	31	2	2	0	—		—		33	2
Eintracht Frankfurt	Total		120	9	5	1	0	0	13	2	138	12
VfL Bochum	1997–98	Bundesliga	30	3	1	0	1	0	6	1	38	4
VfL Bochum	1998–99	Bundesliga	3	0	0	0	—		—		3	0
VfL Bochum	1999–00	2. Bundesliga	31	2	4	1	—		—		35	3
VfL Bochum	2000–01	Bundesliga	20	0	2	0	—		—		22	0
VfL Bochum	2001–02	2. Bundesliga	26	0	2	0	—		—		28	0
VfL Bochum	2002–03	Bundesliga	1	0	1	0	—		—		2	0
VfL Bochum	Total		111	5	10	1	0	0	0	0	121	6
VfL Bochum II	2002–03	Oberliga Westfalen	1	0	—		—		—		1	0
SC Bregenz	2002–03	Bundesliga	13	0			—		0	0		
SC Bregenz	2003–04	Bundesliga	23	0			—		2	0		
SC Bregenz	2004–05	Bundesliga	16	0			—		—			
SC Bregenz	Total		52	0			0	0	2	0		
Hessen Kassel	2005–06	Hessenliga	17	1	—		—		—		17	1
Hessen Kassel	2006–07	Regionalliga	13	1	—		—		—		13	1
Hessen Kassel	2007–08	Regionalliga	0	0	—		—		—		0	0
Hessen Kassel	Total		30	2	0	0	0	0	0	0	30	2
Career total							1	0				
