= Thorsten Flick =

German footballer (born 1976)

Personal information
- Date of birth: 22 August 1976 (age 50)
- Place of birth: Darmstadt, Germany
- Height: 1.86 m (6 ft 1 in)
- Position: Midfielder

Senior career*
| Years | Team | Apps | (Gls) |
| 1994–1998 | Eintracht Frankfurt | 36 | (1) |
| 1998–1999 | Napoli | 2 | (0) |
| 1999 | 1. FC Saarbrücken | | |
| 1999–2000 | VfB Oldenburg | | |
| 2000 | Viktoria Aschaffenburg | | |
| 2000–2002 | Debreceni VSC | 15 | (2) |
| 2002–2003 | KSV Klein-Karben | | |
| 2003–2005 | 1. FC Germania 08 Ober-Roden | | |
| 2005–2006 | SV Erzhausen | | |

International career
| 1996 | Germany U21 | 1 | (0) |
- * Club domestic league appearances and goals

Thorsten Flick (born 22 August 1976) is a German former professional footballer who played as a midfielder. Besides Germany, he has played in Italy and Hungary.
