= Rudi Bommer =

German footballer (born 1957)

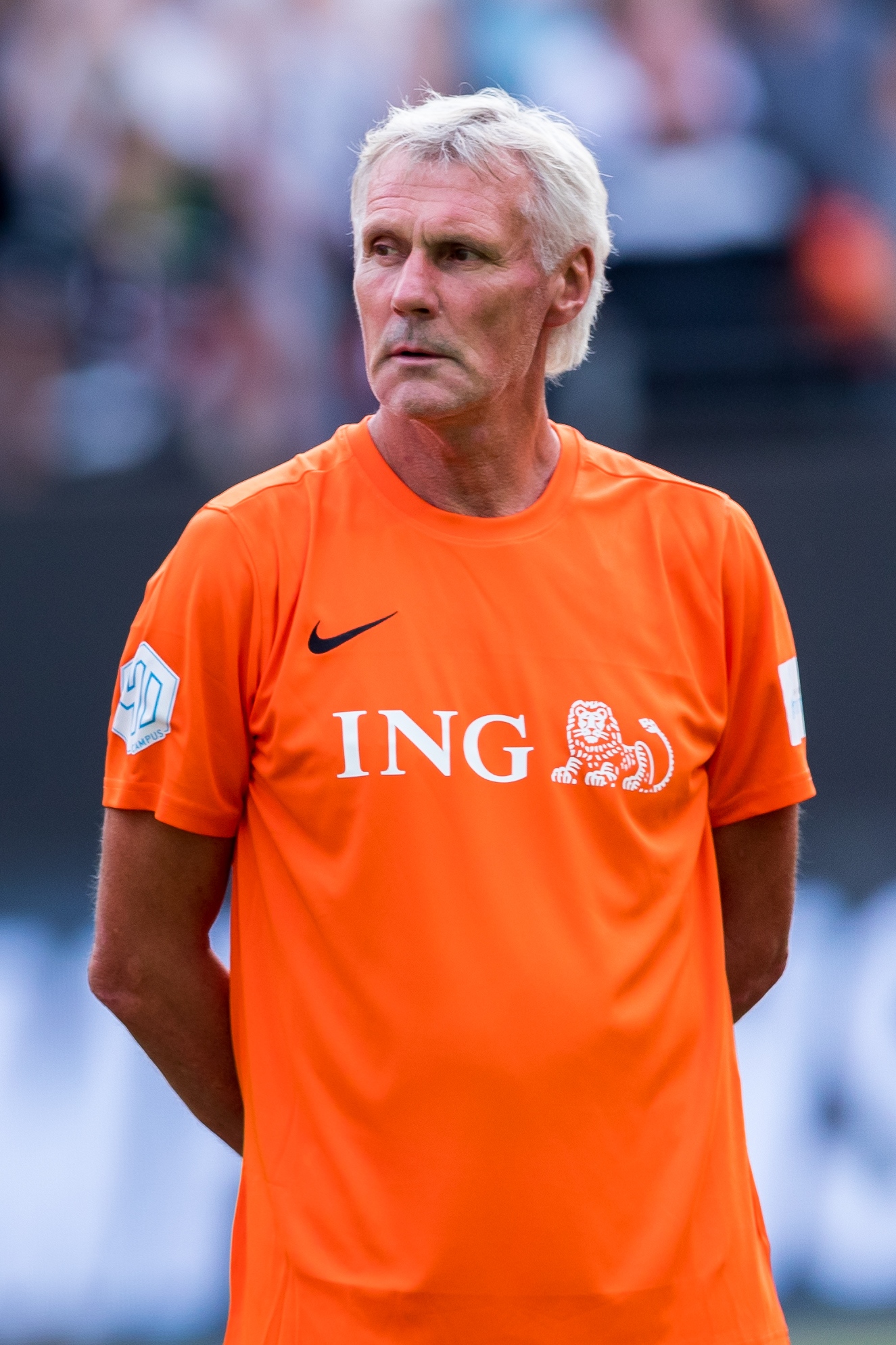
- Bommer in 2022

Personal information
- Full name: Rudolf Bommer
- Date of birth: 19 August 1957 (age 69)
- Place of birth: Aschaffenburg, West Germany
- Height: 1.85 m (6 ft 1 in)
- Position: Midfielder

Youth career
- 1964–1971: TV 1860 Aschaffenburg
- 1971–1973: Viktoria Aschaffenburg
- 1973–1976: Kickers Offenbach

Senior career*
Years	Team	Apps	(Gls)
1976–1985	Fortuna Düsseldorf	264	(38)
1985–1988	Bayer Uerdingen	83	(13)
1988–1992	Viktoria Aschaffenburg		
1992–1997	Eintracht Frankfurt	84	(4)
1998	Viktoria Aschaffenburg		

International career
1984	West Germany	6	(0)

Managerial career
- 1994–1995: Eintracht Frankfurt II
- 1995–1996: Eintracht Frankfurt (assistant)
- 1996: Eintracht Frankfurt (caretaker)
- 1996–1997: Eintracht Frankfurt (assistant)
- 1997–1998: VfR Mannheim
- 1998–2000: Viktoria Aschaffenburg
- 2000–2004: Wacker Burghausen
- 2004: 1860 München
- 2005–2006: 1. FC Saarbrücken
- 2006–2008: MSV Duisburg
- 2011: Wacker Burghausen
- 2012–2013: Energie Cottbus
- 2015: Viktoria Aschaffenburg
- 2016–2019: Hessen Dreieich
Medal record
Representing West Germany
Olympic Games
Bronze medal – third place	1988 Seoul	Team competition
- * Club domestic league appearances and goals

Rudolf "Rudi" Bommer (born 19 August 1957) is a German former footballer, who played as a midfielder, and current football manager.

== Playing career ==
Born in Aschaffenburg, Bommer played 417 games between 1976 and 1996 for Fortuna Düsseldorf, Bayer Uerdingen and Eintracht Frankfurt in the Bundesliga. Bommer scored 54 goals in the German top flight.

He played for West Germany at the Euro 84 in France.

== Coaching career ==
Bommer started his coaching career with the reserve team of Eintracht Frankfurt between July 1994 and August 1995. After stops at VfR Mannheim where he was head coach between July 1997 and April 1998. Bommer then moved on to Viktoria Aschaffenburg where he was head coach from July 1998 to June 2000. Bommer became head coach Wacker Burghausen in October 2000 and won his debut 4–3 against his former club VfR Mannheim. Bommer left and became head coach of 1860 München in July 2004. His tenure ended in December 2004; winning five of his 15 league matches in charge. Bommer's next job was as head coach of 1. FC Saarbrücken. He was there between August 2005 and May 2006. Bommer then went to MSV Duisburg between July 2006 and November 2008; finishing with a league record of 28 wins, 21 draws, and 31 losses. Bommer returned to Wacker Burghausen in July 2011 and was there until December 2011. He then joined Energie Cottbus the next month and was there until November 2013.

In October 2015 he became the new coach of Regionalliga Bayern club Viktoria Aschaffenburg, replacing the sacked Slobodan Komljenović.

== Coaching record ==
As of 21 October 2015

Team	From	To	Record					
Team	From	To	G	W	D	L	Win %	Ref.
VfR Mannheim	1 July 1997	30 April 1998	30	7	11	12	23.33	
Viktoria Aschaffenburg	July 1998	June 2000	62	26	21	15	41.94	
Wacker Burghausen	26 October 2000	30 June 2004	68	22	23	23	32.35	—
1860 München	1 July 2004	4 December 2004	17	6	6	5	35.29	
1. FC Saarbrücken	31 August 2005	3 May 2006	30	10	5	15	33.33	
MSV Duisburg	1 July 2006	9 November 2008	87	32	22	33	36.78	
Wacker Burghausen	1 July 2011	31 December 2011	21	6	11	4	28.57	—
Energie Cottbus	1 January 2012	5 November 2013	65	18	22	25	27.69	
Viktoria Aschaffenburg	19 October 2015		0	0	0	0	—	
Total			380	127	121	132	33.42	—
