= Rottenegg =

Rottenegg may refer to:

- Rottenegg, Geisenfeld, a village in Upper Bavaria, now part of the municipality of Geisenfeld
- Rottenegg, Upper Austria, a village in Upper Austria
- Rottenegg Castle, a ruined castle in Upper Austria dating to the 13th century

== See also ==
- Rotten egg (disambiguation)
