= Arrest (disambiguation) =

Arrest is the action of the police or another authority to apprehend and take under guard a person who is suspected of committing a crime.

Arrest and its derivations may also refer to:

== Places ==
- Arrest, Somme, a commune of the Somme département in France
- Arresting, Germany, a village

== Arts, entertainment, and media ==
- "Arrested" (Modern Family), an episode of the television series Modern Family
- "The Arrest", a song by Andrew Lloyd Webber and Tim Rice from the 1971 rock opera Jesus Christ Superstar

== Other uses ==
- Ship arrest, a procedure under maritime law
- Arrest, a feature of the development of some nematodes, similar to the dauer larva stage
- "Arrested landing" or arrestment, the use by an aircraft of a tailhook to bring it to a stop upon landing (either on a ship or land)
  - Arresting gear, used to slow an aircraft as it lands
- Cardiac arrest, the cessation of normal circulation of the blood due to failure of the ventricles of the heart to contract effectively
- Respiratory arrest

== See also ==
- Arrested development (disambiguation)
