= Henri François Lambert =

- Born: 3 June 1760; Haraucourt, Meurthe-et-Moselle, France
- Died: 7 September 1796 (aged 36); Neustadt an der Donau, Bavaria
- Occupation: Soldier

Henri François Lambert (3 June 1760 – 7 September 1796) was a brigadier general of the French revolutionary army.

== Early years ==
Henri François Lambert was born in Haraucourt, Meurthe-et-Moselle (then Duchy of Lorraine), on 3 June 1760 to a humble family. His parents were Antoine Lambert and Magdelaine Mangin, both in the service of the count of Chatenay. The count and his wife were his godparents. He was well educated by the standards of the time. On 5 August 1780, aged twenty, he volunteered for the regiment of Artois-Infanterie, and rose slowly through the ranks. He was named corporal on 2 December 1784 and quartermaster on 1 November 1785. The next year he married the daughter of the regiment's bandleader. He was given leave on 15 October 1788 and returned to his family, who were living in Dijon.

== Revolutionary soldier ==
When the French Revolution (1789–1799) broke out, Lambert supported it enthusiastically. On 18 May 1790 he was appointed adjutant in the national guard of Burgundy, and in 1792 he was named second in command. On 5 September 1792 he was elected lieutenant colonel and second in command of the battalion of grenadiers of the Côte-d'Or. He was attached to the Army of the North, which he joined soon after the Battle of Jemappes in November, and with whom he served in the Belgian campaign. His battalion was then assigned to the Army of the Alps, which freed Lyon from the royalists.

On 28 January 1794 he was promoted to brigadier general of the Army of the Rhine and Moselle. He played a distinguished role in the first wars of the revolution. He served with distinction in several battles, notably in the recovery of Kaiserslautern in the Palatinate on 29 September 1794. In June 1795, he was given command of a brigade of the Army of the Rhine and Moselle under General Jean-Charles Pichegru. The French army crossed the Rhine and took a position on the right bank, near Mannheim, but was forced to recross the river by Austrian troops. Lambert fought valiantly during the retreat, and was mentioned in an order of the day on 25 November 1785. After the replacement of Pichegru by General Jean Victor Marie Moreau, in June 1796 the Army of the Rhine and Moselle recrossed the Rhine at Strasbourg and defeated the Austrians at Renchen and at Rastadt. Lambert again distinguished himself as the army advanced into Bavaria.

== Death ==
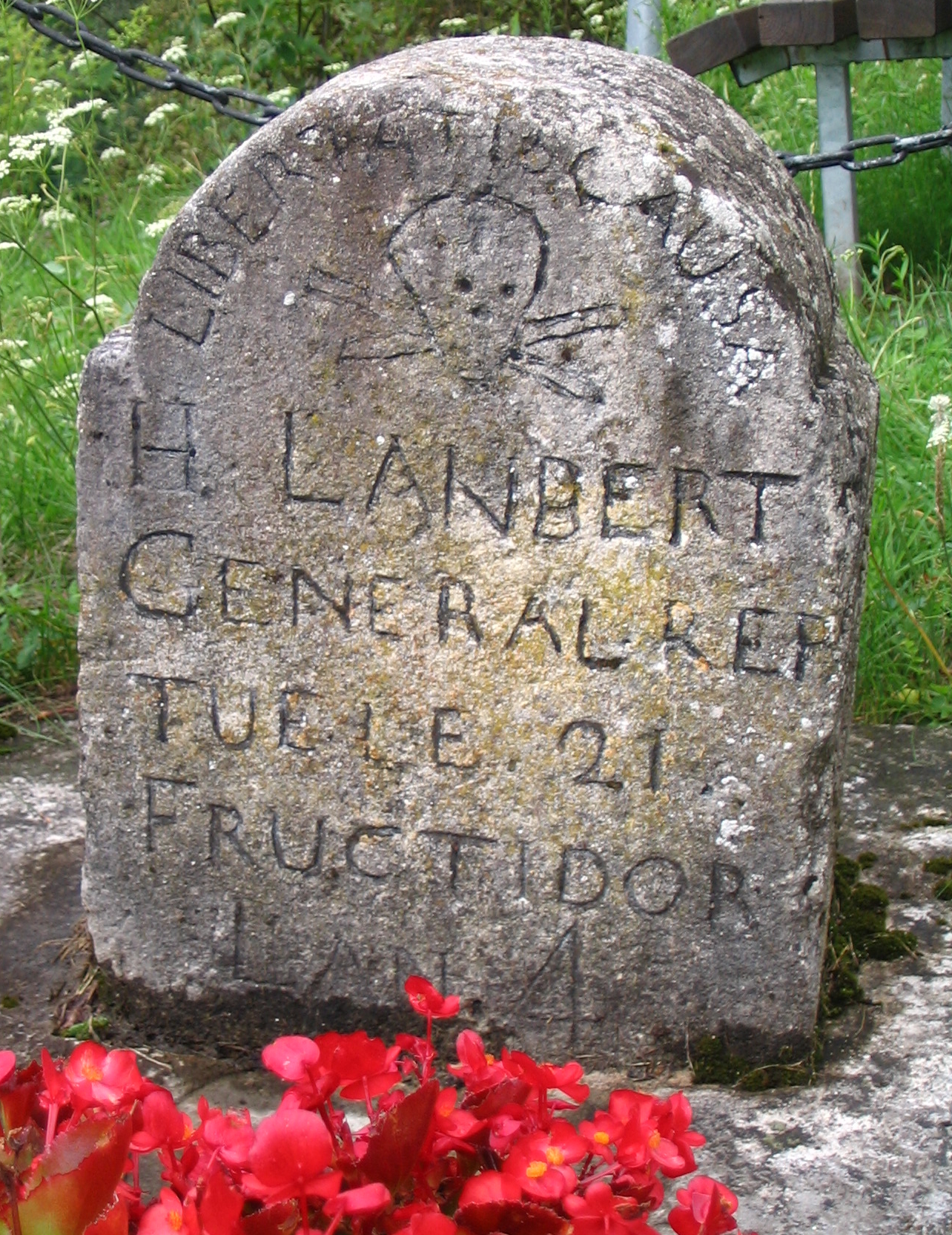
Gravestone of Henri Lambert in Rottenegg

Lambert was conducting a reconnaissance at Menstadt, a small town near Nuremberg, when he was mortally wounded by the explosion of a bomb. He was taken back to Mauern, a village in Neustadt an der Donau, behind the lines. Lambert died on 7 September 1796. Before dying he asked that the fragment of shrapnel that had wounded him be preserved in the church, where it remains today. He was buried beside the Mountain Church of Rottenegg, about 20 kilometres (12 mi) to the southwest. During his lifetime Lambert had chosen this as his final resting place if he should die in the region.
