= General Lambert =

General Lambert may refer to:

- Henri François Lambert (1760–1796), French Revolutionary Army brigadier general
- John Lambert (British Army officer) (1772–1847), British Army general
- John Lambert (general) (1619–1684), British Army major general
- Karl Lambert (1815–1865), Imperial Russian Army General of Cavalry
- Peter J. Lambert (fl. 1980s–2020s), U.S. Air Force major general
- Thomas Stanton Lambert (1870/71–1921), British Army major general (temporary rank)
- Wayne W. Lambert (born 1936), U.S. Air Force brigadier general
