= Sankt Gotthard im Mühlkreis =

- Municipality
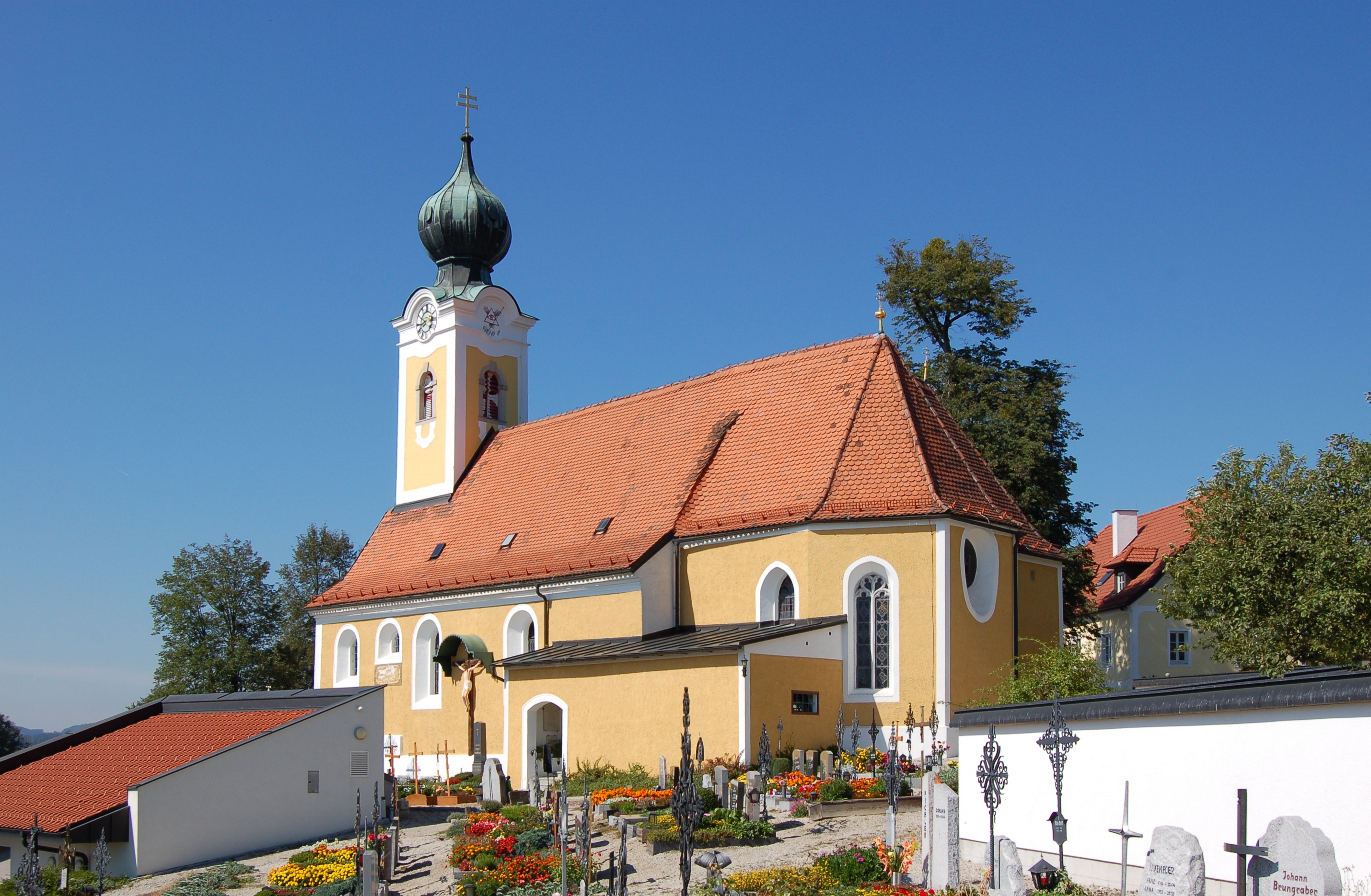

- Coat of arms

- Location within Austria
- Coordinates: 48°22′10″N 14°07′02″E
- Country: Austria
- State: Upper Austria
- District: Urfahr-Umgebung

Government
  - Mayor: Johannes Rechberger (ÖVP)

Area
  - Total: 11.99 km^{2} (4.63 sq mi)
- Elevation: 473 m (1,552 ft)

Population (2018-01-01)
  - Total: 1,332
  - Density: 111.1/km^{2} (287.7/sq mi)
- Time zone: UTC+1 (CET)
  - Summer (DST): UTC+2 (CEST)
- Postal code: 4112
- Area code: 0 72 34
- Vehicle registration: UU
- Website: www.sanktgotthard.at

Sankt Gotthard im Mühlkreis is a municipality in the district of Urfahr-Umgebung in Upper Austria, Austria.

Attractions include Schloss Eschelberg, a stately home built in 1596, and the ruined 13th-century Rottenegg Castle.

== Villages ==
The municipality contains the following villages:

- Eschelberg
- Grasbach
- Haselwies
- Maierleiten
- Mühlholz
- Oberstraß
- Rottenegg

== Population ==
Historical population
| Year | Pop. | ±% |
|---|---|---|
| 1869 | 779 | — |
| 1890 | 790 | +1.4% |
| 1910 | 756 | −4.3% |
| 1923 | 761 | +0.7% |
| 1934 | 742 | −2.5% |
| 1939 | 688 | −7.3% |
| 1951 | 966 | +40.4% |
| 1971 | 975 | +0.9% |
| 1991 | 1,125 | +15.4% |
| 2001 | 1,299 | +15.5% |
| 2007 | 1,314 | +1.2% |

== Gallery ==
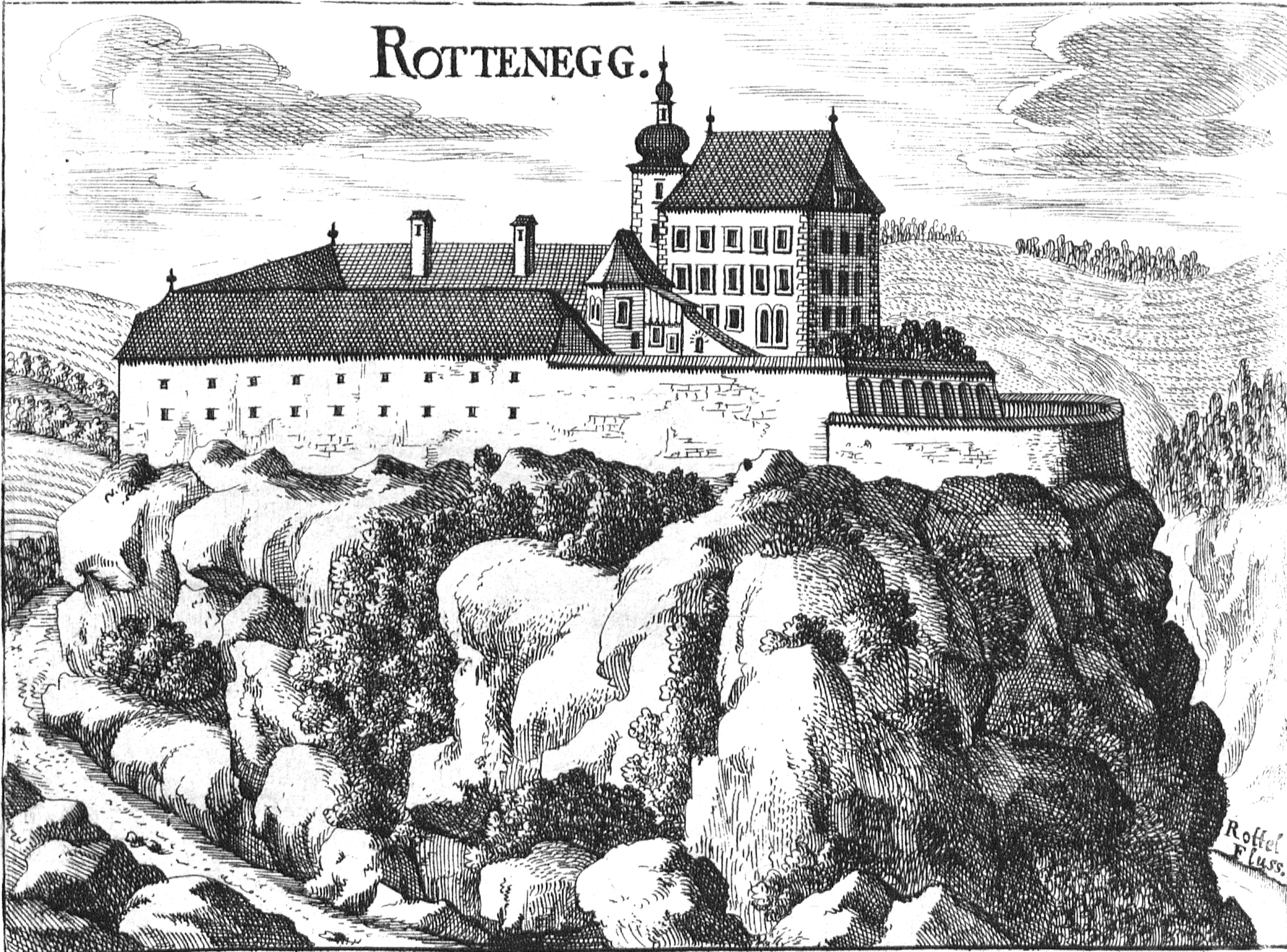
Rottenegg Castle, now ruined

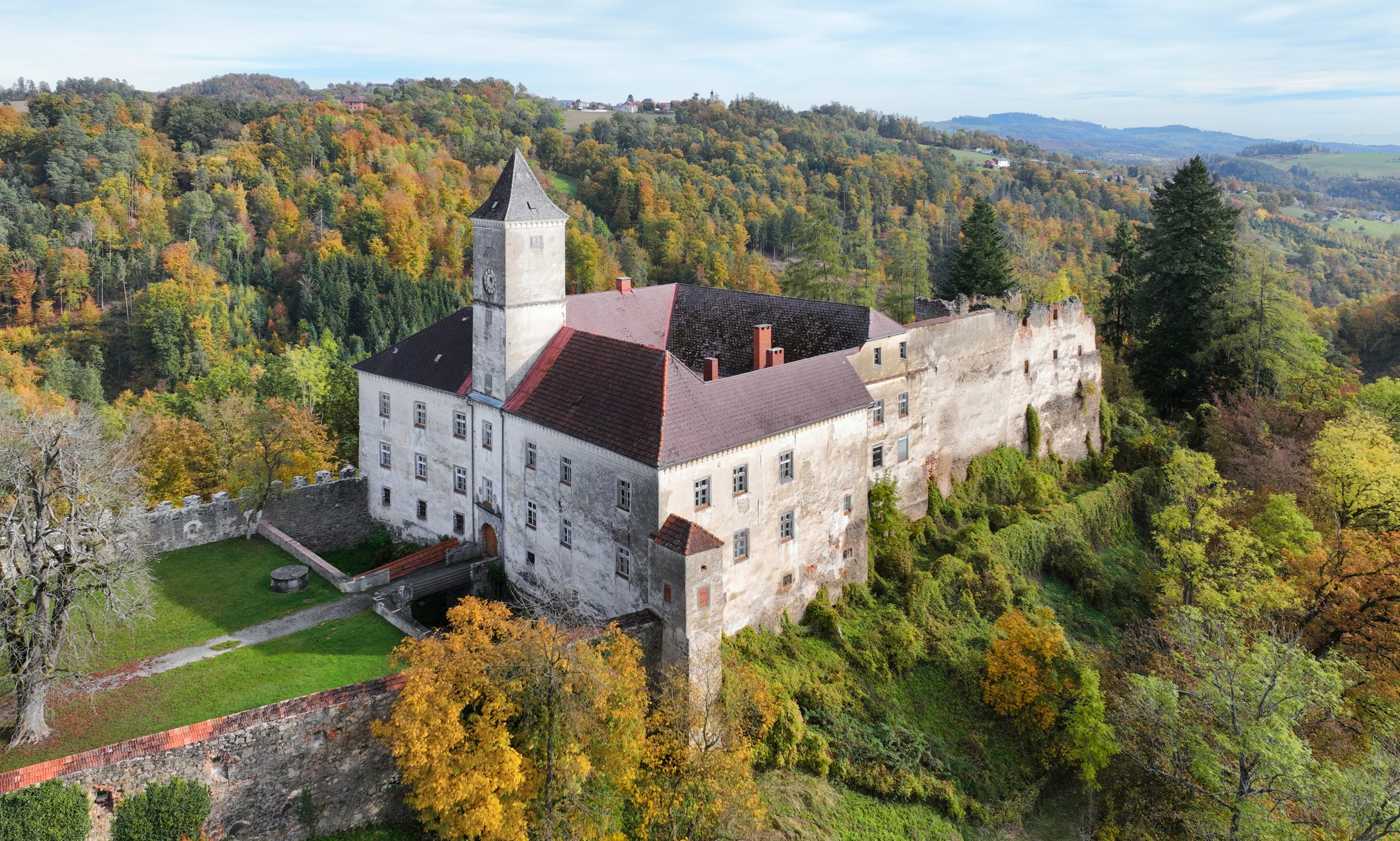
Schloss Eschelberg, built in 1596

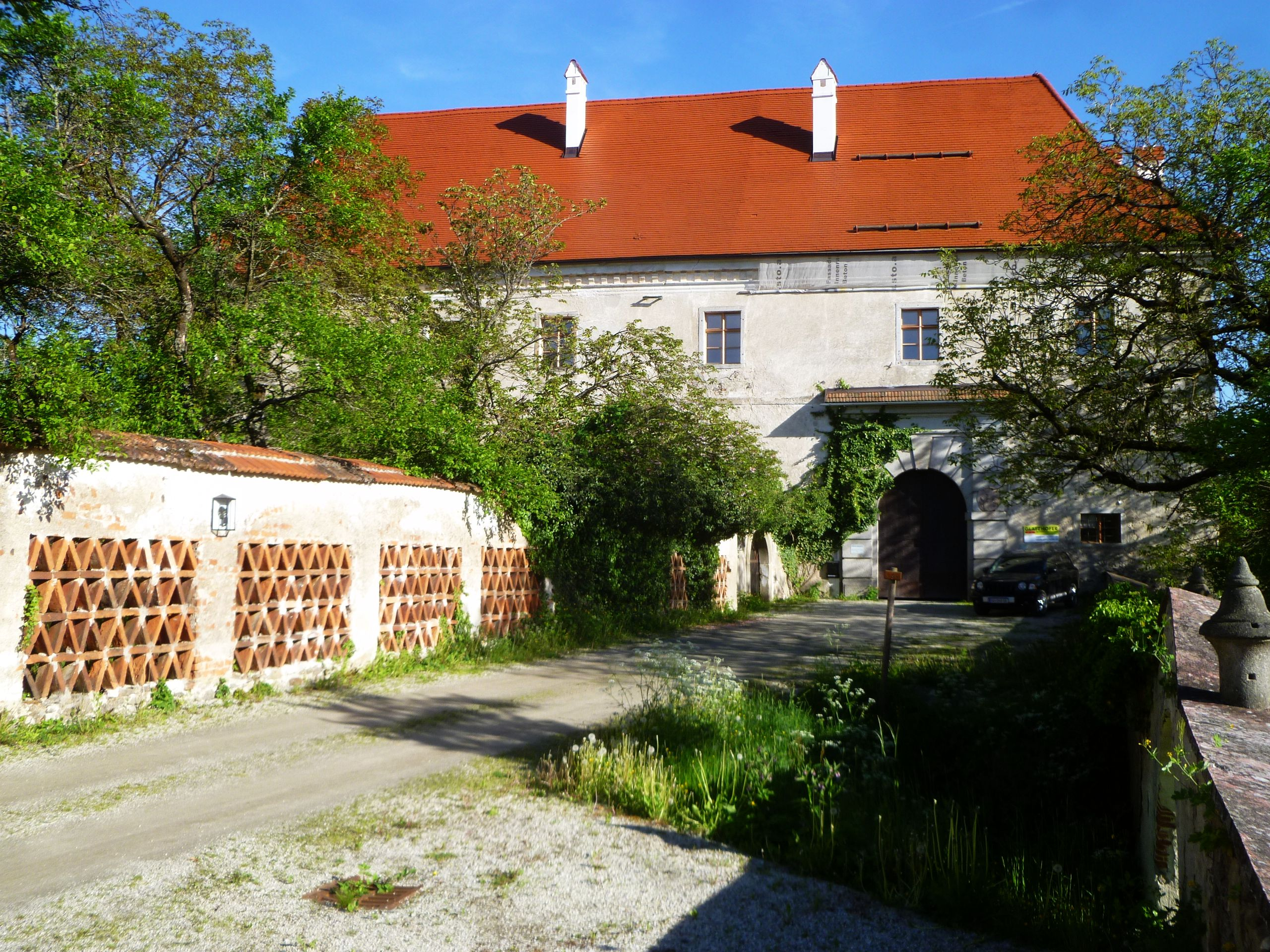
Schloss Eschelberg forest house

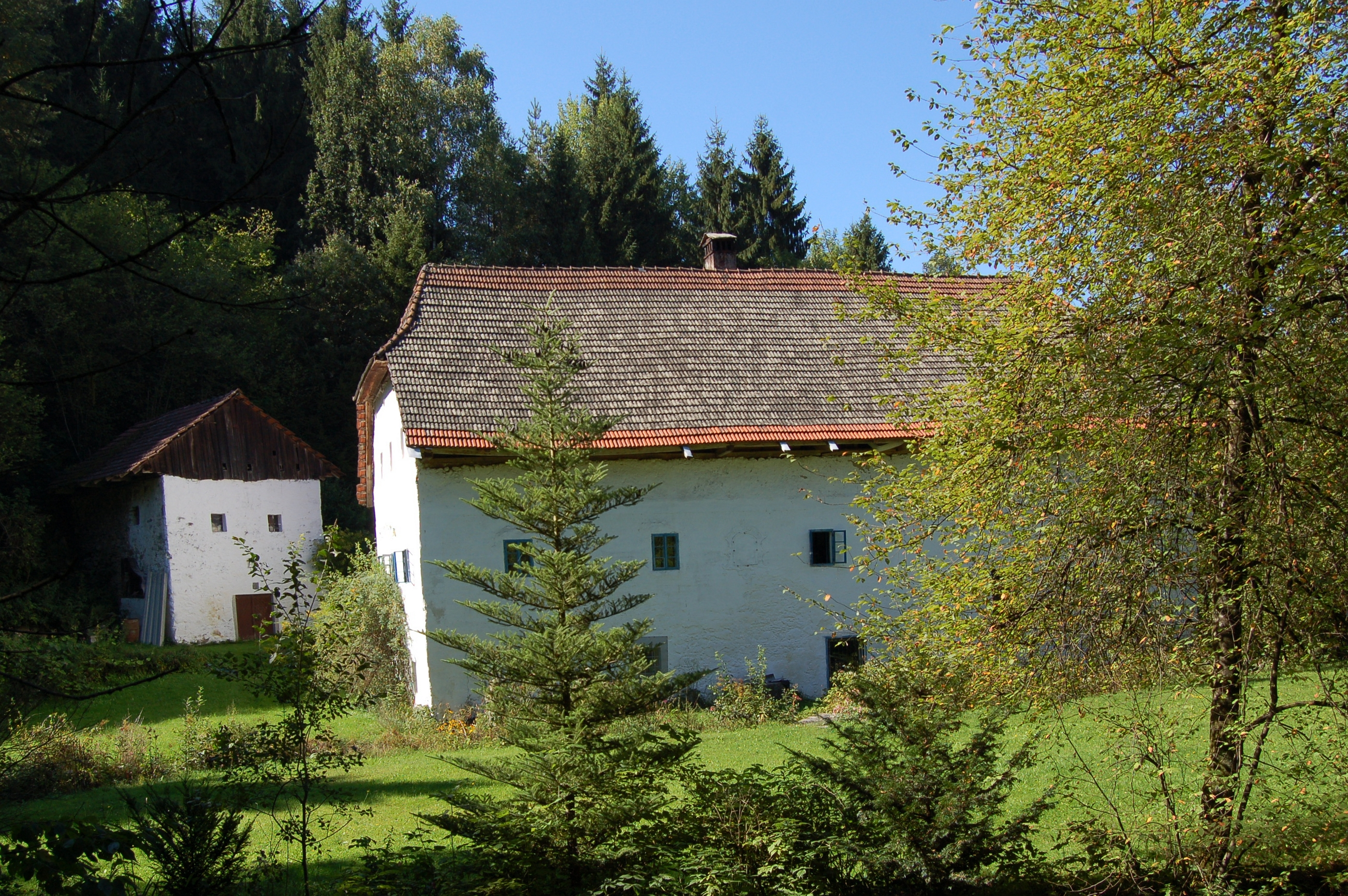
Medieval mill house

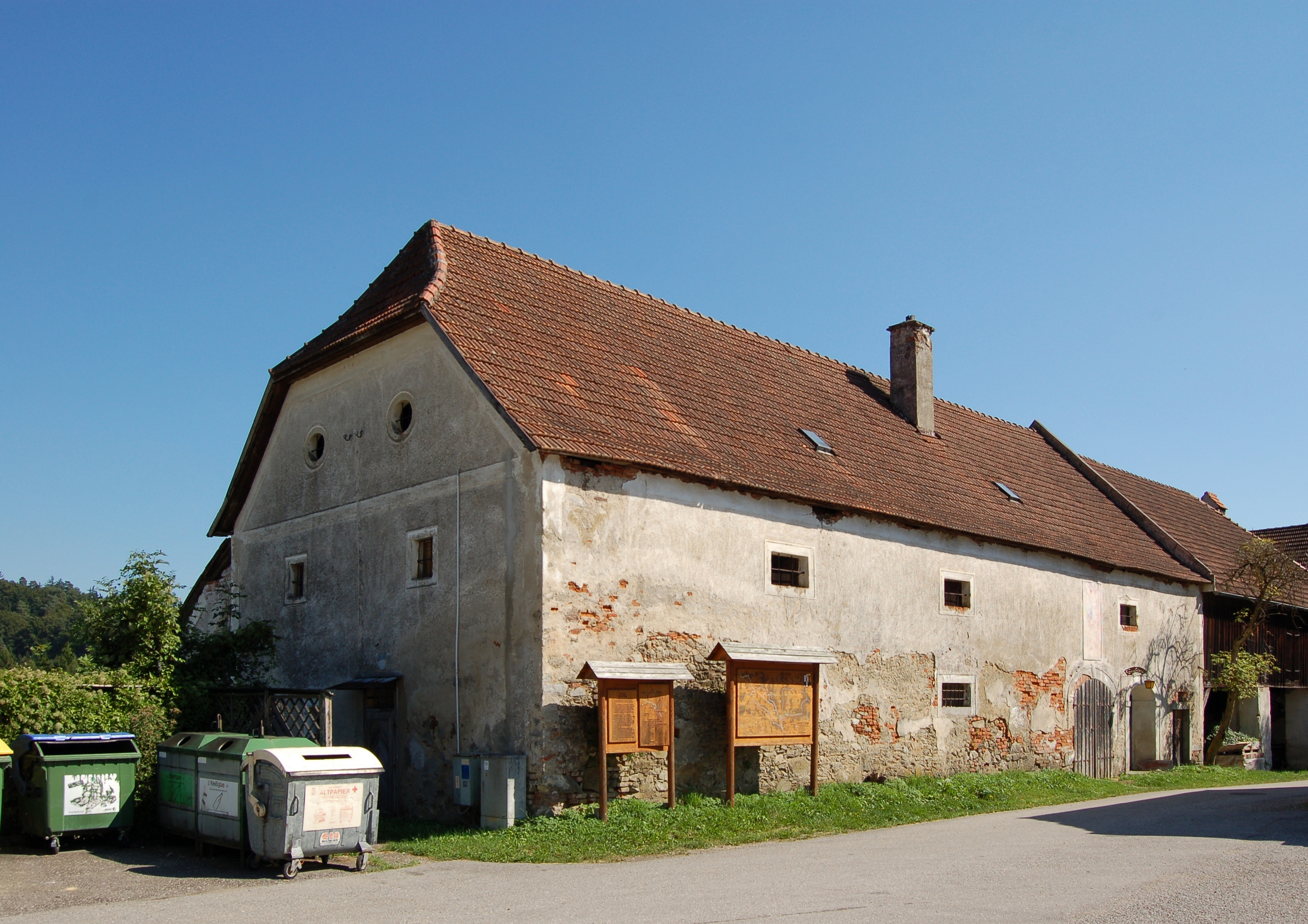
Former prison
