= Heinrich II von Rotteneck =

- Diocese: Regensburg
- Installed: 1277
- Term ended: 1296
- Predecessor: Leo Thundorfer
- Successor: Konrad V von Luppurg

Personal details
- Died: 7 August 1296
- Denomination: Catholic

Heinrich II von Rotteneck (died 7 August 1296) was prince-bishop of Regensburg from 1277 to 1296.

== Family ==
Heinrich II von Rotteneck was the son of Count Meinard of Rotteneck and Beatrix, born Countess of Moosburg. His family gave their name to the town of Rottenegg, near Geisenfeld. He was the last of his line. His sister was the mother of Konrad II von Pfeffenhausen, Bishop of Eichstätt.

== Bishop ==
Heinrich became bishop of Regensburg in 1277. The Regensburg Cathedral had been damaged in a great fire in 1273, and many of its treasures had been lost. On 21 August 1279 Heinrich von Rotteneck sold the Rottenegg castle and its possessions including the Mainburg castle to Duke Ludwig II of Bavaria to obtain funds for rebuilding his cathedral. As well as promoting construction of the new Gothic cathedral, Heinrich donated many devices and vestments. He introduced choral singing, and brought in two monks from Heilsbronn Abbey to give lessons in music.

Heinrich and Gottfried, Bishop of Passau (r. 1282-83 - 1285), mediated peace between Henry XIII, Duke of Bavaria, and Duke Albert of Austria, who was allied with the Archbishop of Salzburg. They were engaged in a dispute of ownership of various properties above the Inn.

Heinrich II von Rotteneck died on the 7 August 1296. The cathedral's museum holds an antependium, or cloth hanging, that depicts him. The elaborate silk weaving is of Italian origin. Three oil bottles that he donated have been preserved, among the finest examples of their type from high Middle Ages.
