= Wöhr, Bavaria =

Coordinates: 48.814°N 11.751°E

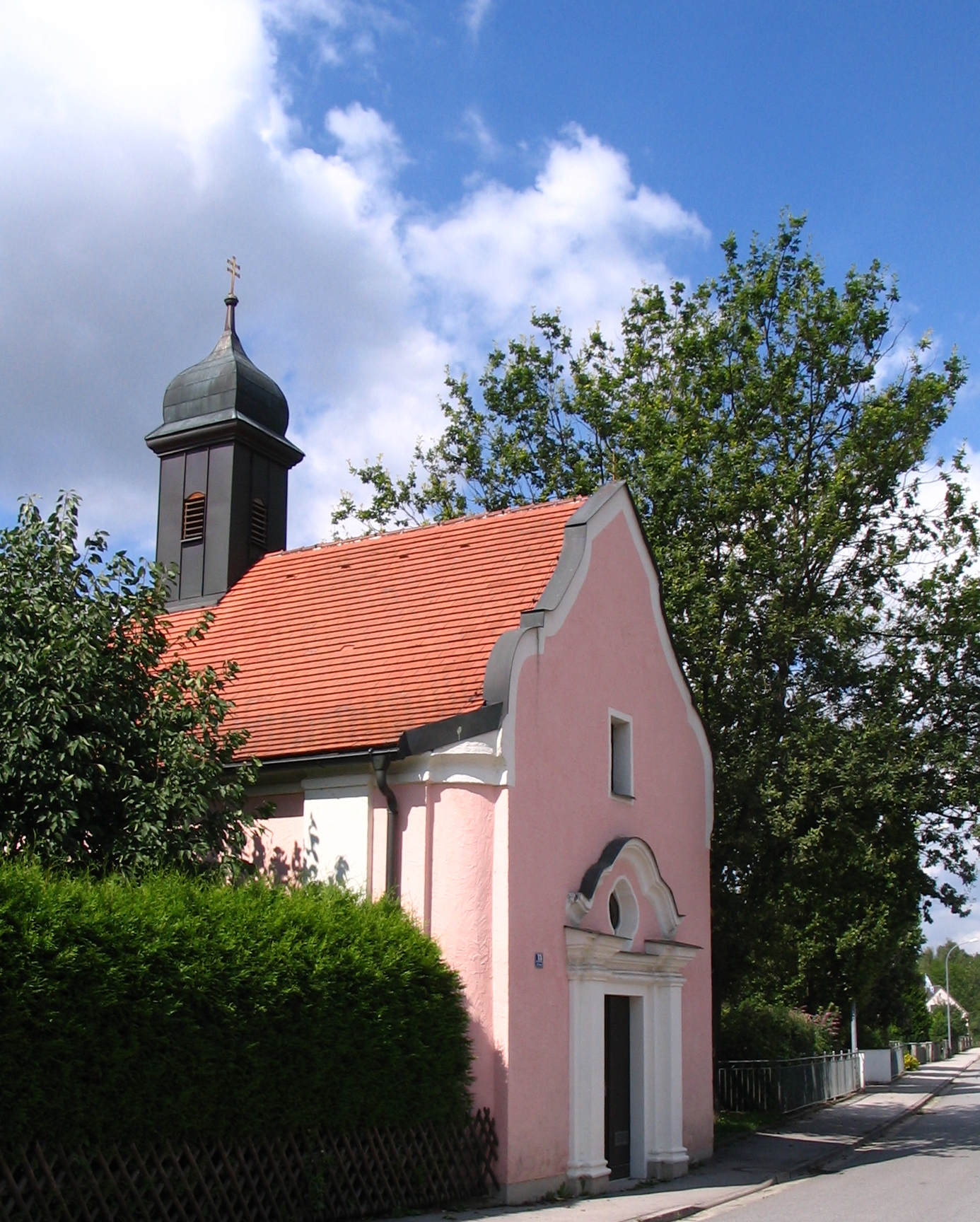
Eich Reis Chapel, Neustadt an der Donau district of Wöhr

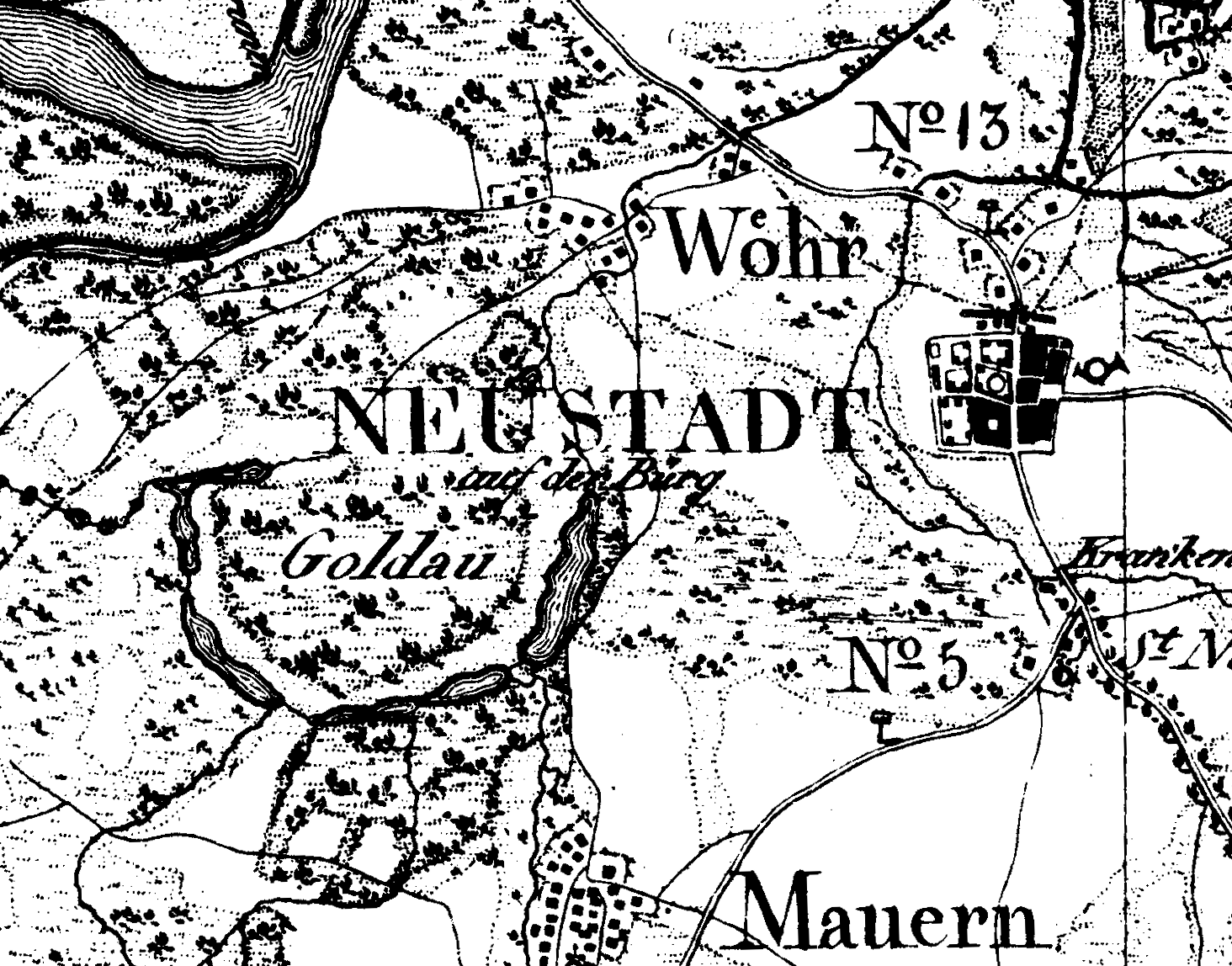
Map of Wöhr in 1819

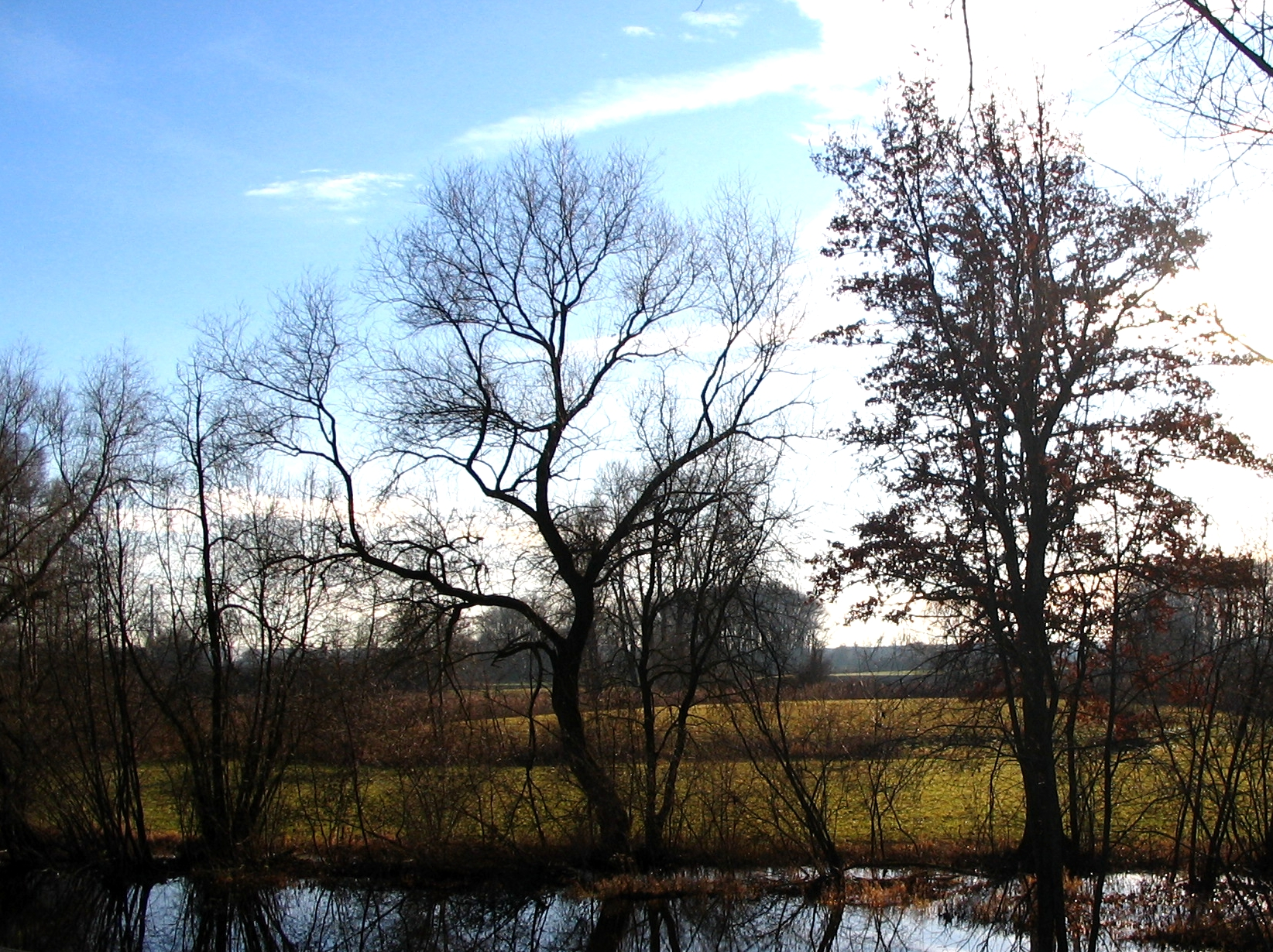
Remains of Burgstall Castle

Wöhr is an historic town, and now district of Neustadt an der Donau in Lower Bavaria on the Danube in Bavaria, Germany.

The settlement of Wöhr is between Neustadt and the Danube riverbank, and is actually older than Neustadt. Wöhr was incorporated in the late Middle Ages as part of the city of Neustadt and residents of Wöhr could be citizens of the city, but lived outside the fortification.

Wöhr was also the seat of the noble family of the Lords of Wöhr and the ducal Urbar Office who lived in the so-called Burgstall Castle(now ruins).

== See also ==
- Wöhr; Upper Bavaria; Germany lat:48.351342, lo11.363362 outside Munich
