= Rotten egg =

Rotten egg or rotten eggs may refer to:

- Century egg, a Chinese method of preserving eggs
- Vrot eier, an Afrikaner children's game similar to Duck, duck, goose
- Rotten Egg Nebula, a name for the Calabash Nebula
- "Rotten Egg", a song by Gas Huffer from their 1998 album Just Beautiful Music
- "The Rotten Egg", a 1986 episode of G.I. Joe: A Real American Hero

== See also ==
- Egg as food § Storage
- Hydrogen sulfide, a compound which smells of rotten eggs
- Rottenegg (disambiguation)
- The Good Egg (disambiguation)
