= Jürgen Wittmann =

German footballer and coach

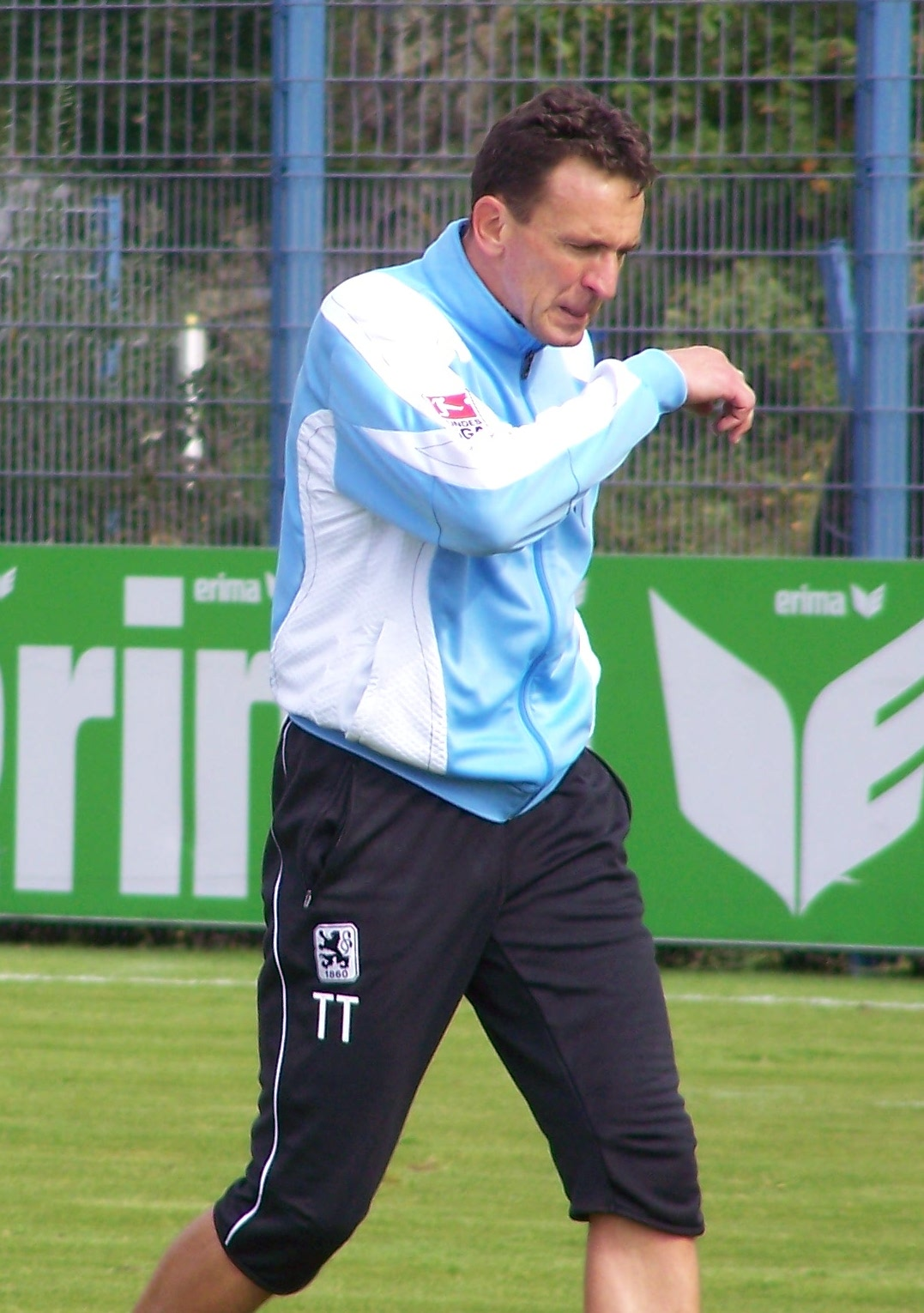
- Jürgen Wittmann in 2009.

Personal information
- Date of birth: 14 August 1966 (age 60)
- Place of birth: Neustadt an der Donau, Germany
- Height: 1.89 m (6 ft 2 in)
- Position: Goalkeeper

Youth career
- TSV Neustadt/Donau
- 1. FC Nürnberg
- MTV Ingolstadt

Senior career*
| Years | Team | Apps | (Gls) |
| 1984–1989 | MTV Ingolstadt | | |
| 1989–1992 | Fortuna Düsseldorf | 10 | (0) |
| 1993–1994 | MTV Ingolstadt | | |
| 1994–2001 | SpVgg Unterhaching | 141 | (0) |
| 2001–2003 | TSV 1860 Munich II | | |

Managerial career
- 2001–2007: TSV 1860 Munich II (GK coach)
- 2007–2013: TSV 1860 Munich (GK coach)
- * Club domestic league appearances and goals

Jürgen Wittmann (born 14 August 1966 in Neustadt an der Donau) is a German former footballer who became a coach. He worked for many years as a goalkeeping coach with TSV 1860 Munich. He played five seasons in the Bundesliga for Fortuna Düsseldorf and SpVgg Unterhaching.
