= Hienheim =

- Ortsteil of Neustadt an der Donau
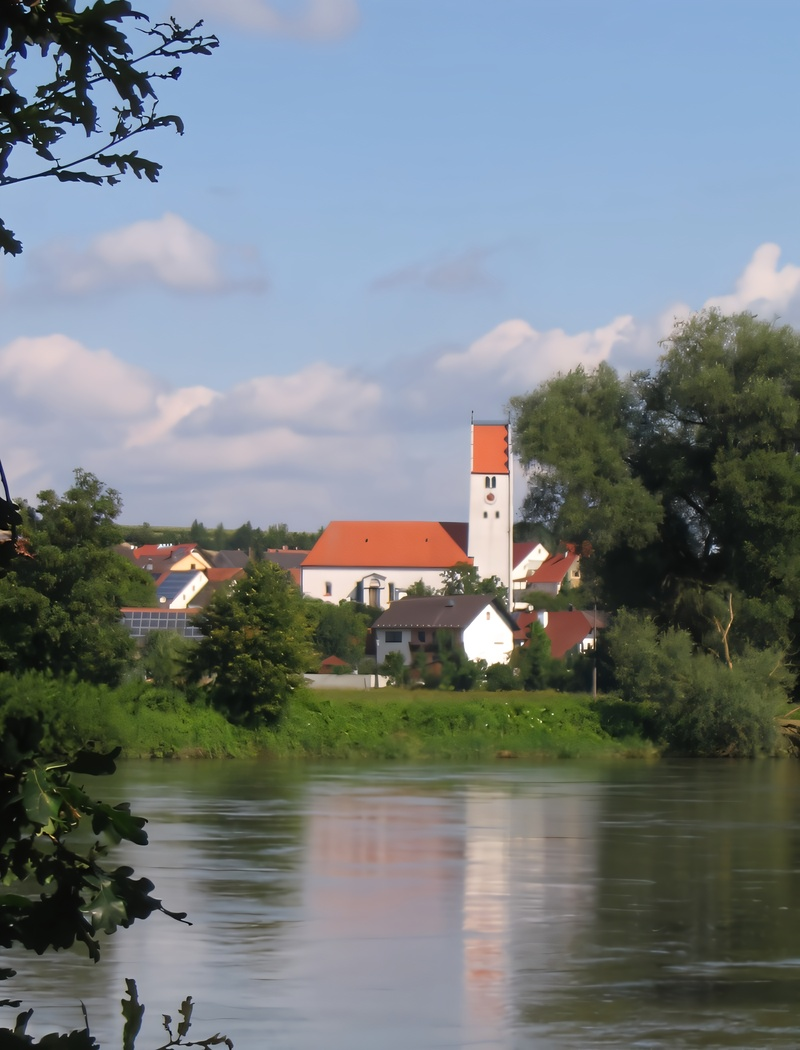
- View of the Church of St. George, Hienheim, from across the Danube
- Interactive map of Hienheim
- Location within Germany Location within Bavaria
- Coordinates: 48.864°N 11.767°E
- Country: Germany
- State: Bavaria
- Admin. region: Niederbayern
- District: Kelheim
- Town: Neustadt an der Donau
- Elevation: 356 m (1,168 ft)
- Time zone: UTC+01:00 (CET)
  - Summer (DST): UTC+02:00 (CEST)
- Postal codes: 93333

Hienheim (Central Bavarian: Heannam) is a district of the town of Neustadt an der Donau in the district of Kelheim in Bavaria, Germany.

== Location ==
Hienheim is located at an altitude of 356 metres (1,168 ft) above sea level on the left bank of the Danube opposite the village of Eining, on the road connecting Neustadt to Essing in the Altmühl valley. Regensburg is about 45 kilometres (28 mi) to the east, Ingolstadt 30 kilometres (19 mi) to the west. Munich is approximately 100 kilometres (62 mi) south.

== History ==
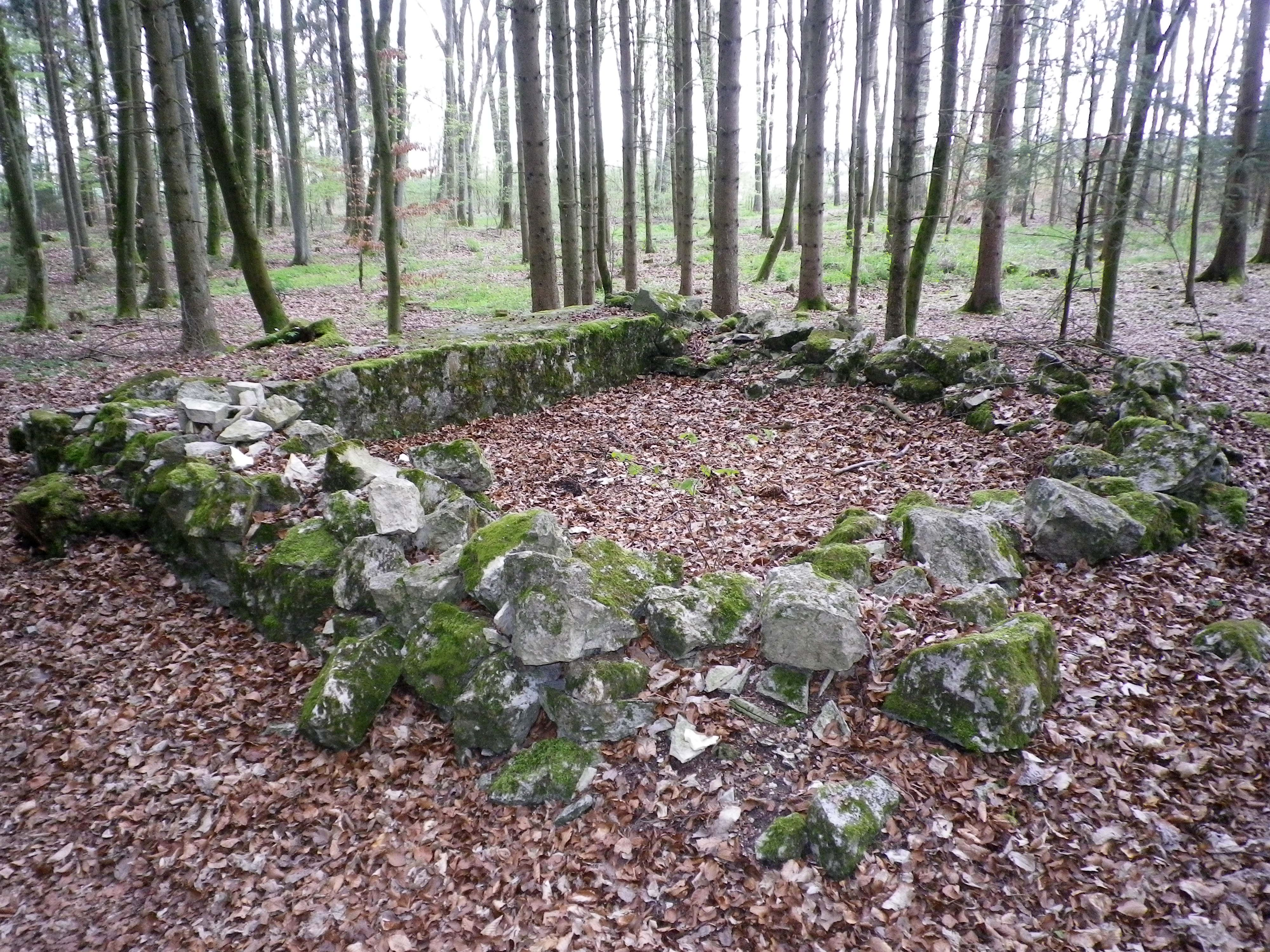
Foundation of a Roman limes watchtower on the Hienheim Woods

Excavations by Leiden University revealed that there was a Neolithic settlement, dating from around 5000 BC, in the area of Hienheim.

The place is referred to in several sources as early as 1097/98 as "Hohenheim" ("village on the hill").

The Roman limes, the border fortification against the Germanic tribes, began near Hienheim. The 166 kilometres (103 mi) long Rhaetian Limes, from Hienheim to Lorch, consisted primarily of stone walls up to three meters (ten feet) high and wooden watchtowers, while the 382 kilometres (237 mi) Upper Germanic Limes (running from Lorch northwest to Bonn) was mostly composed of earthen ramparts, trenches and palisades. While the construction of Roman Limes fortifications was already begun in 1 AD, the Germanic Limes dates from 84 AD. From the year 260 AD, the Limes had to gradually be abandoned because of Alemannic raids.

The beginning of the border wall is marked by the so-called "Hadrian's Column" (Hadriansäule), a monument erected in 1856 on the road to Kelheim. The heyday of the limes occurred under the Emperors Trajan and Hadrian, 98 to 138 AD. The Upper Germanic-Rhaetian Limes has been declared an historic monument, and since 2005 a World Heritage Site by UNESCO. In 1979, the small fort at Hienheim, part of the fortifications, was discovered by aerial archaeology.

Nearby is a monument of a very different kind, the 17th–18th century "Iron Hand" (Eiserne Hand). According to legend, a seamstress on her way to work regularly met a wolf for whom she always brought a piece of bread. One time she had no bread, and the wolf was said to have mangled and devoured her, all except for her right hand, which had always fed him.

The previously independent municipality of Hienheim was dissolved on 1 January 1978. The larger portion was assigned to the city of Neustadt; a smaller part with fewer than 25 inhabitants went to Kelheim.

== Infrastructure ==
Hienheim is an elongated village with approximately 700 inhabitants and a predominantly rural character.

Some craft shops have located here or carry on the traditions. There is also a sports field for the local football club. Beyond the borders of Hienheim is a sail plane facility near the village, which attracts aviation fans from all over Germany in summer.

A ferry across the Danube connects Hienheim with Eining. On May 4, 2006, this ferry sank; However, the four people on board were rescued without major injuries.

The German Limes Cycle Route leads through the village. This follows the Upper Germanic-Rhaetian Limes over 818 kilometres (508 mi) from Bad Hönningen on the Rhine to Regensburg on the Danube. The German Limes Road (Deutsche Limes-Straße) runs through the town, and the Limeswanderweg (Limeswanderweg) also leads through Hienheim.

== Churches ==
Hienheim's Catholic Church of St. George has a Romanesque choir tower, probably dating from the 12th century. In the 16th and again in the 19th centuries, the church was further expanded, provided with a cemetery wall, and last restored in 1985.

North of the church is the Sebastianskapelle, originally Late Gothic but later structurally altered into the Baroque style.

== People from Hienheim ==
- Edith Prock (born December 5, 1949, in Hienheim), a singer of popular traditional music.
- Georg Schwaiger (born January 23, 1925, in Hienheim), Catholic church historian.

== Gallery ==
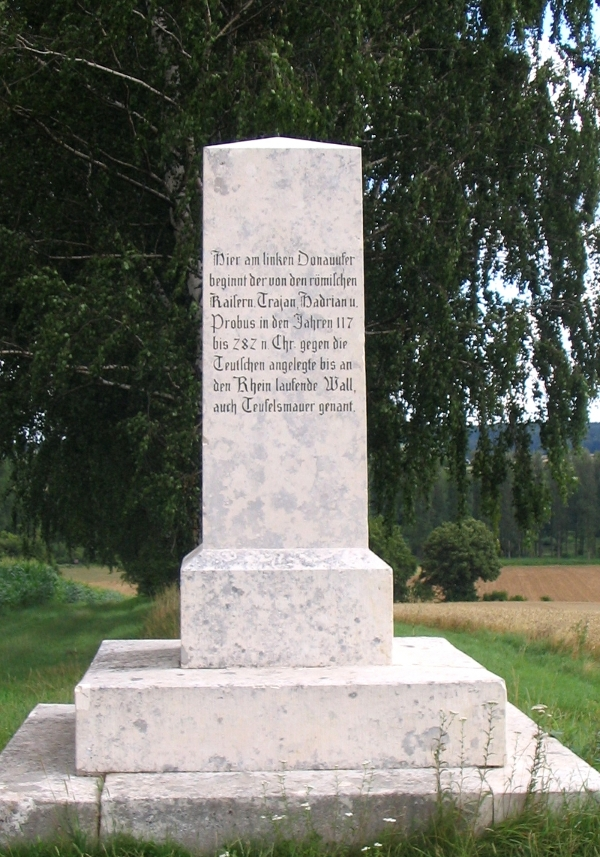
Hadrian's Column

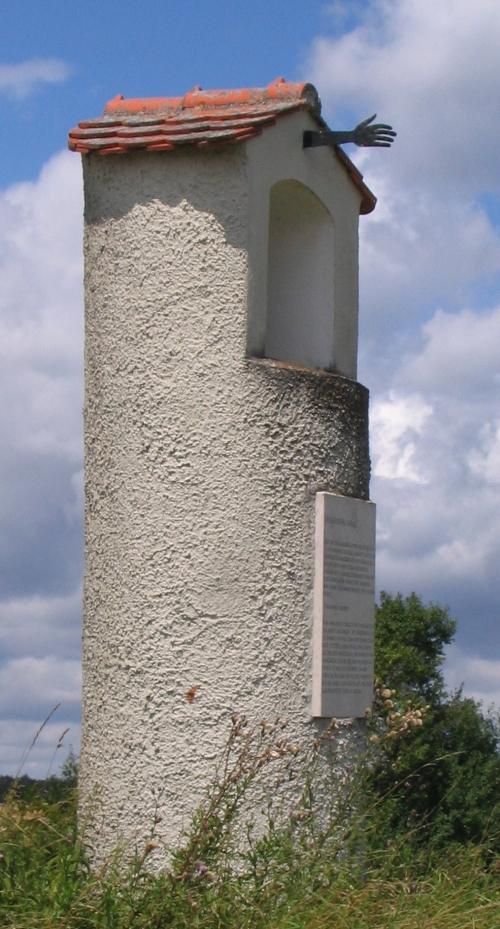
"The Iron Hand"

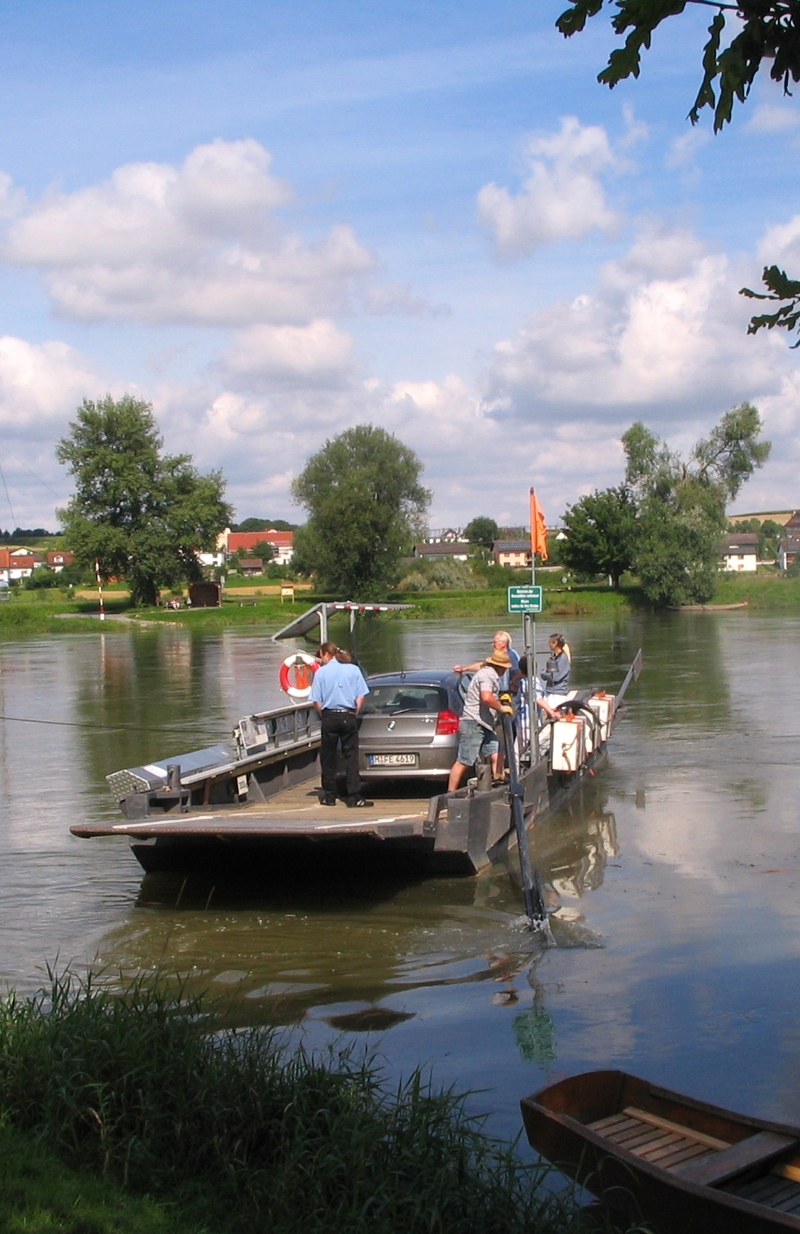
Danube Ferry

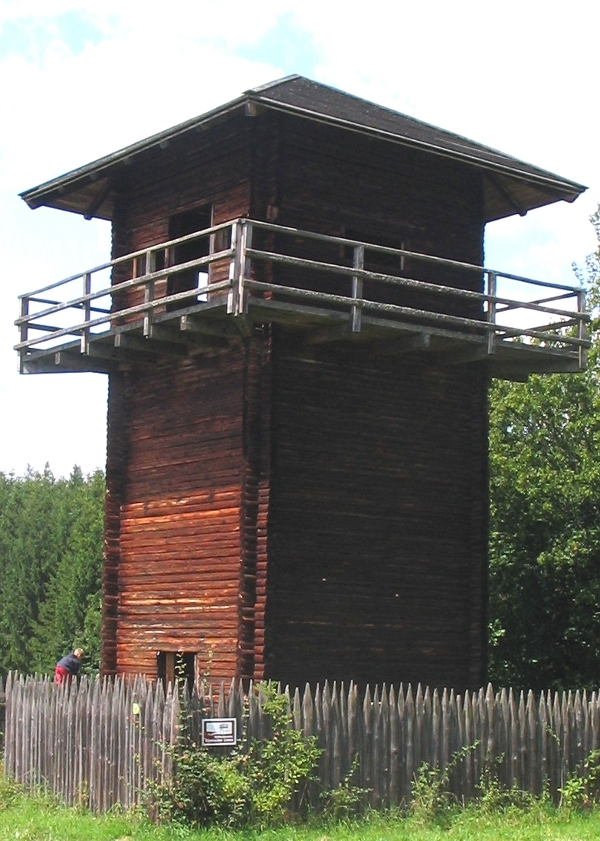
Replica Limes watchtower, burned 2009

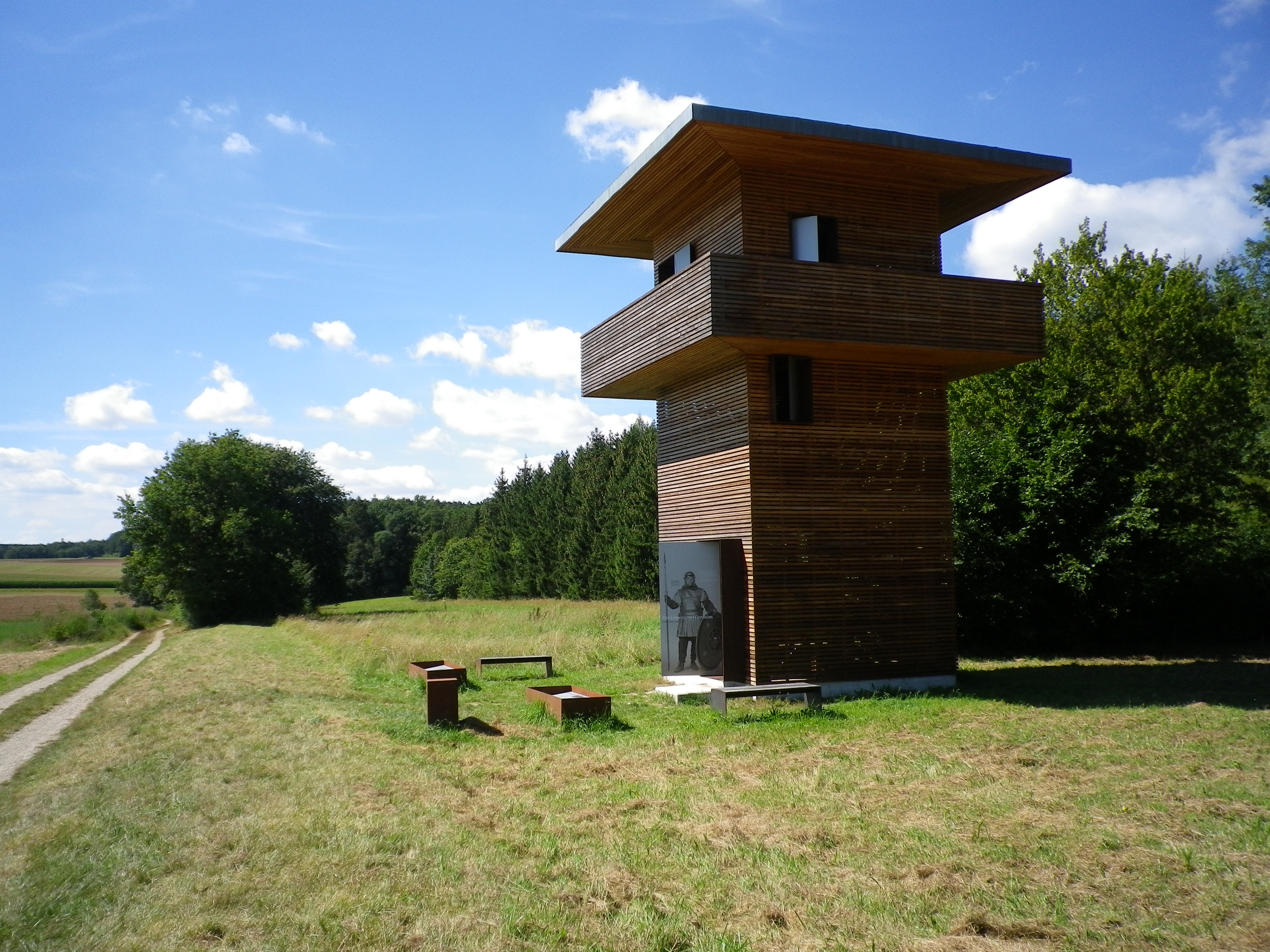
Replica Limes Watchtower in Hienheim, built in 2013
