= Rottenegg Castle =

Ruined castle in Austria

- Rottenegg, Sankt Gotthard im Mühlkreis, Austria
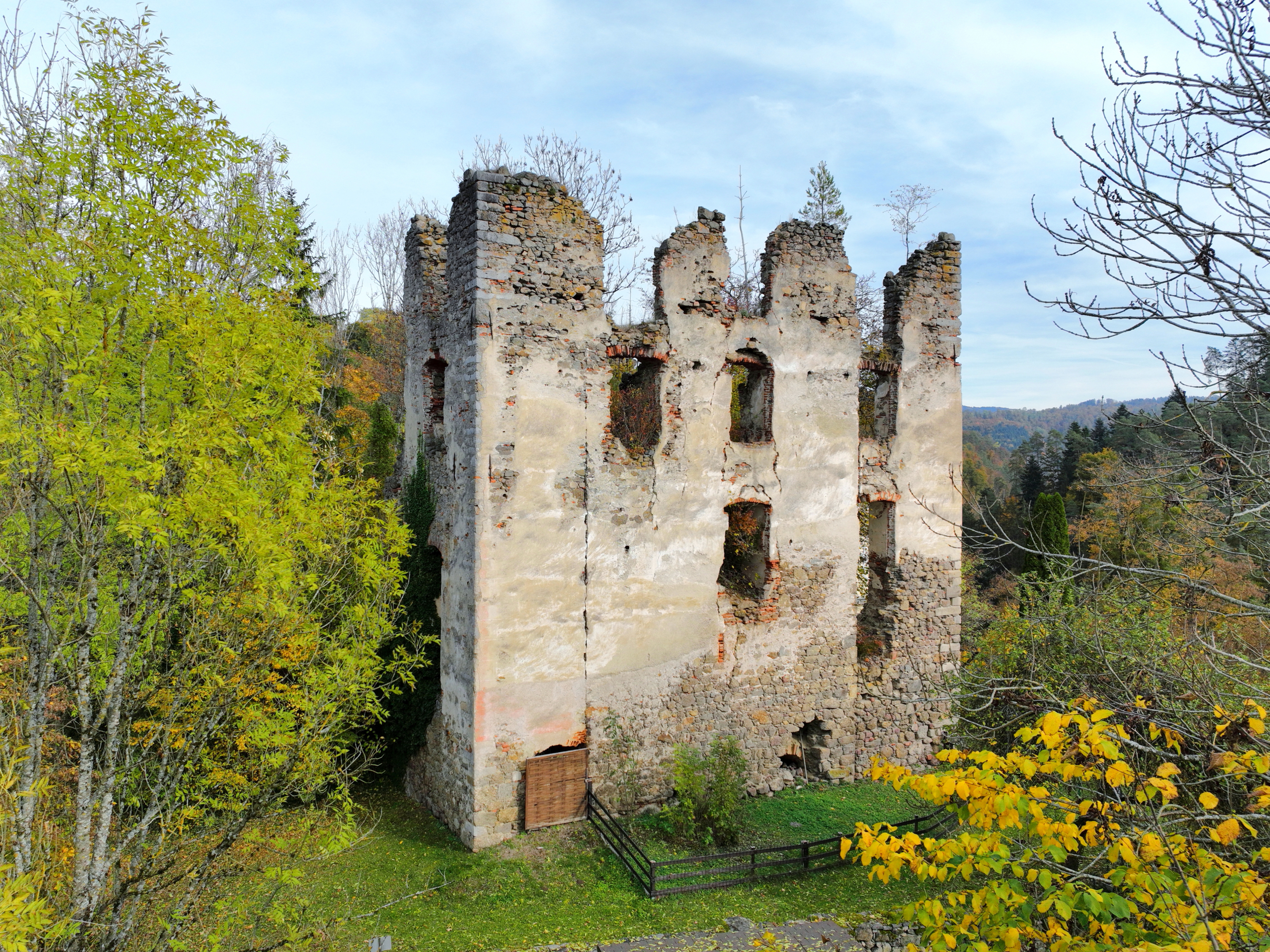
- Southwest view of Rottenegg castle ruins

Site information
- Condition: Ruined

Location
- Location in Austria
- Location within Austria
- Coordinates: 48.369167°N 14.139722°E
- Height: Three stories

Site history
- Built: c. 1289
- Materials: Stone

Rottenegg Castle (German: Burgruine Rottenegg) is a ruined castle near the village of Rottenegg in the municipality of Sankt Gotthard im Mühlkreis, Austria. It dates to the 13th century, and was built to protect a medieval trade route. After 1712 the castle was allowed to decay, and much of it has disappeared.

== Location ==
Rottenegg Castle is in Upper Austria about 14 kilometres (8.7 mi) northwest of Linz. Is about 3.7 kilometres (2.3 mi) to the north of Ottensheim, which lies on the Danube. The ruined castle is on a projecting rock promontory where the Kleinen Rodl enters the Großen Rodl river from the north, looking over the confluence. It guarded an old trade route that ran past this location.

== History ==
Rottenegg (Note: The name means "red corner", which may refer to the color of the rock or to the color in which the corners were painted.) is first mentioned in 1285. That year Chunrad and Sieghard Piber were cited as witnesses to a charter of the Wilhering monastery. They were named after Rottenegg, which presumably had already been standing for some time. The castle remained in the possession of the Piber family until 1340, when Otto II dem Piber died. His daughter Diemut inherited the property, governess of the Duchess Catherine.

In 1363 the castle was handed to Deimut's sons Ruger and Berengar von Landenberg. Ruger soon died. In 1375 Berengar sold the castle to the brothers Reinprecht, Rudolf and Friedrich von Wallsee. After that the castle changed hands several times. In 1712 it was acquired by Thomas Gundaker, Count Starhemberg, who united it with the domain of Eschelberg and managed it from there. The castle was inhabited by poor people, was not maintained and fell in disrepair. In 1936 it was sold to private owners.

== Building ==
Once a four-story masonry residential and defensive tower, it was later extended and at the turn of the 16th and 17th century was converted into a stately house. The tower was retained and topped with an onion dome. The donjon was integrated into the house and can no longer be seen as a tower from the outside. The house had three levels with comfortable rooms, a large hall, a large and beautiful chapel and vaults, and well-built stone cellars. The chapel occupied the lower two floors of the southwest corner of the residential building.

Today the joists and floors have all collapsed, but the remaining walls and window frames still show elaborate stucco decoration and traces of painting. It can be seen that the castle was repeatedly modified or extended. The large windows would not have originally been present. The surrounding wall and farm buildings have completely gone, but the gatehouse is largely intact, although modernized, and is still occupied. The former grange to the north of the main castle also continued to be used. It was transformed into a well-kept residence in the 19th and 20th centuries.

== Gallery ==
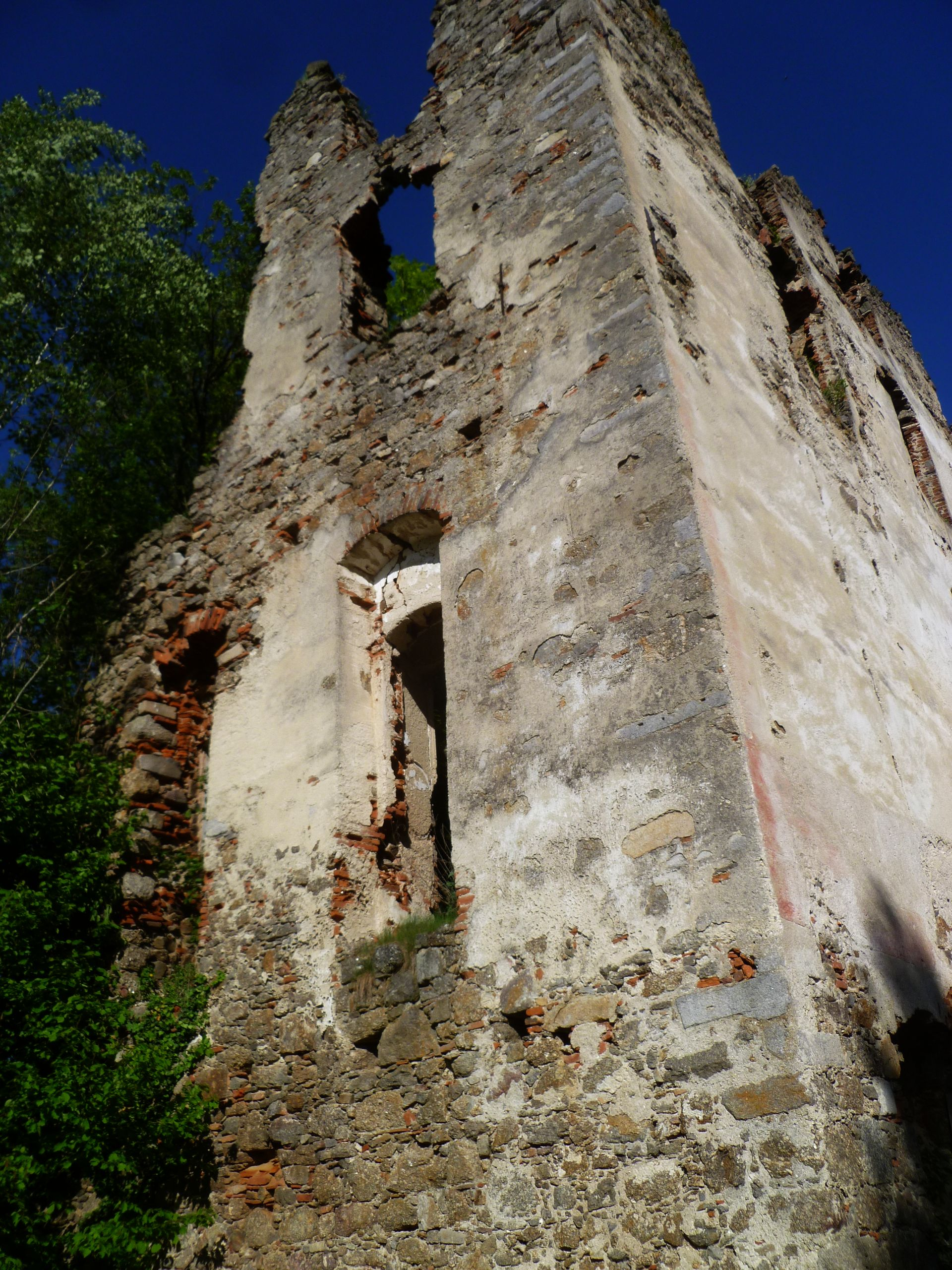
Corner of the castle

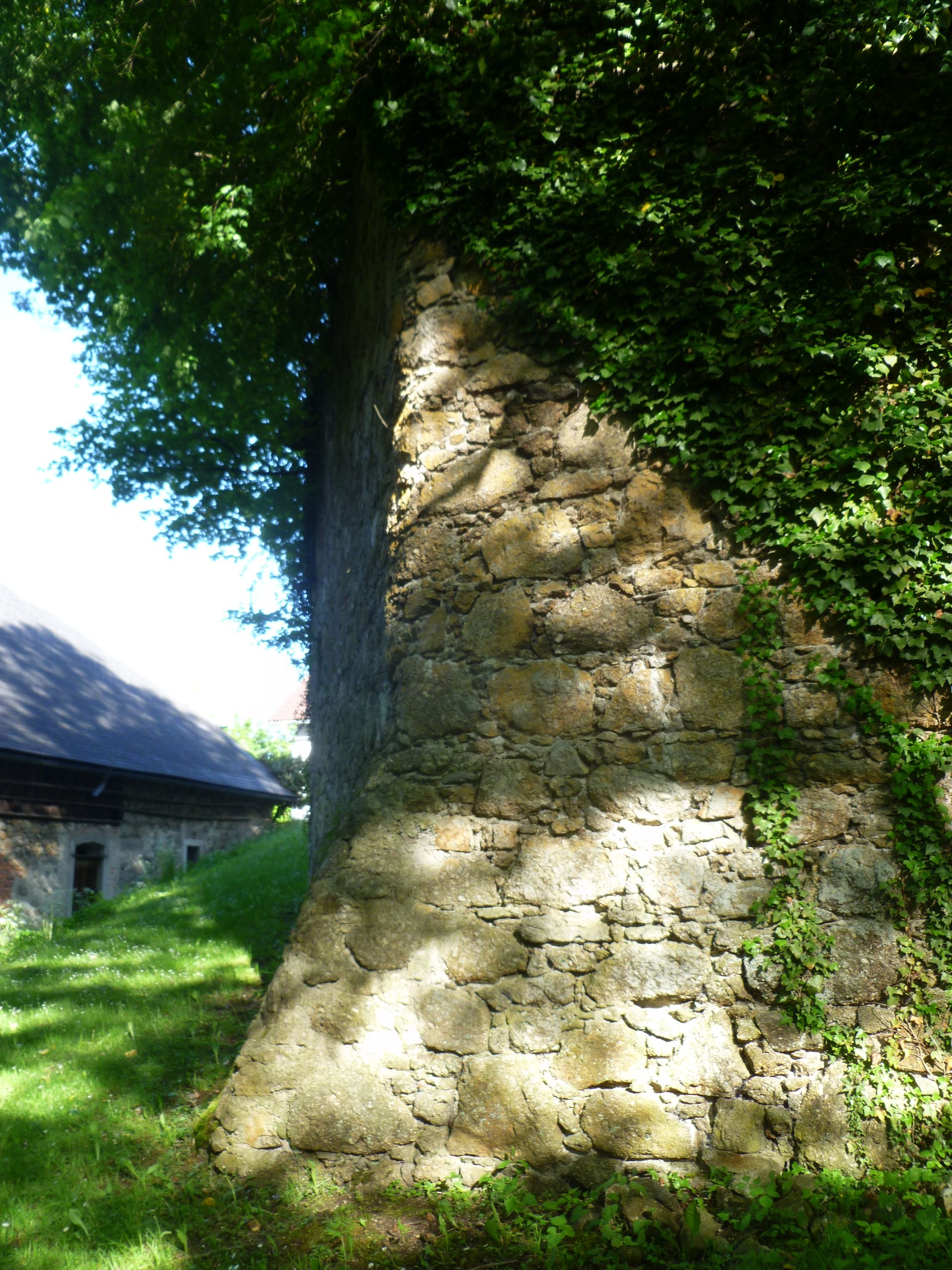
Footing of a wall

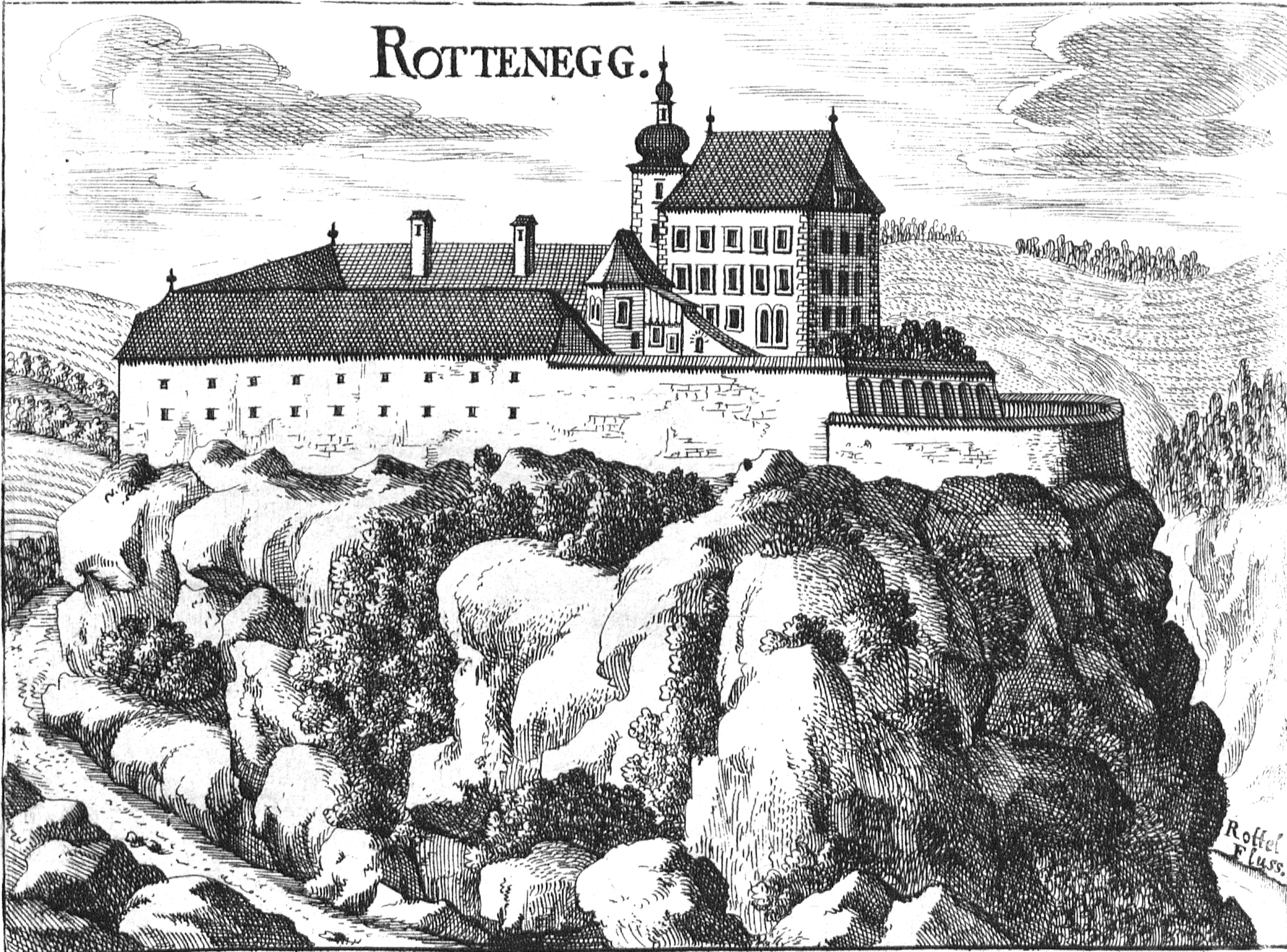
Rottenegg drawn by M. Vischer in 1674

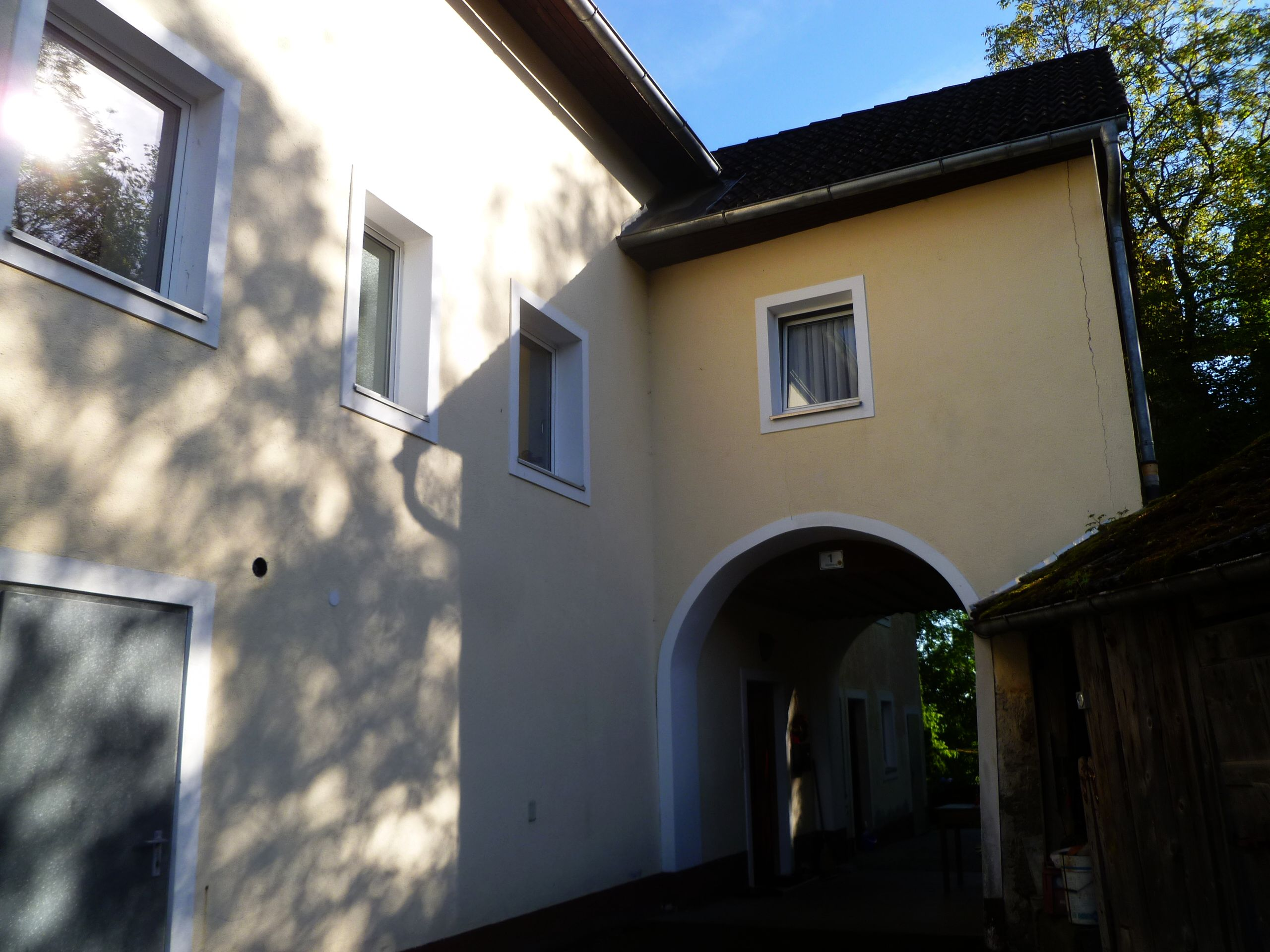
Gatehouse

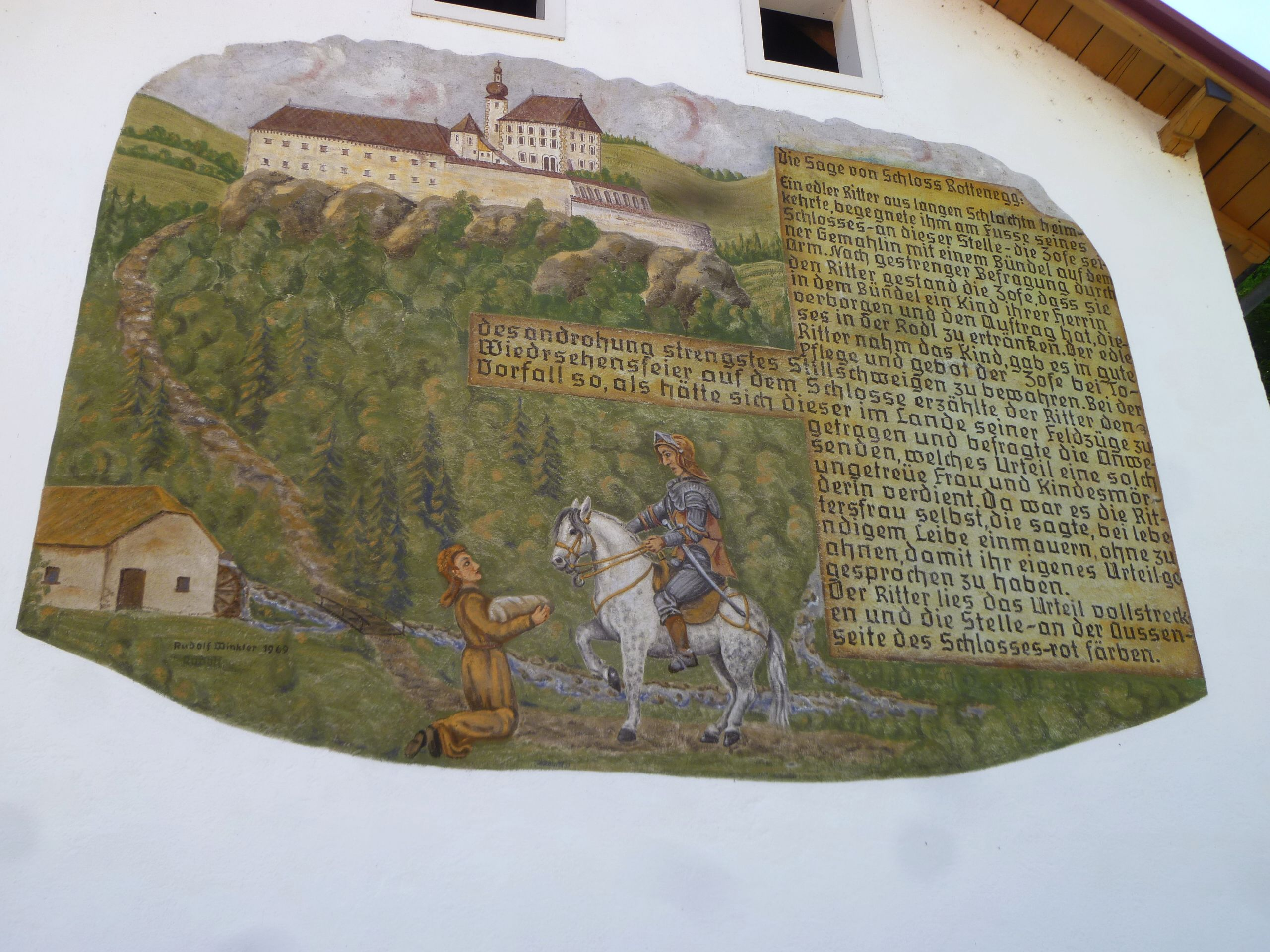
Gatehouse wall - story of the castle

== See also ==
- Place names considered unusual

== Sources ==
- Hammerl, Werner (13 October 2007). "Rottenegg".
- "Rottenegg". Burgenkunde.at.
