= Rottenegg, Geisenfeld =

Rottenegg
- Village
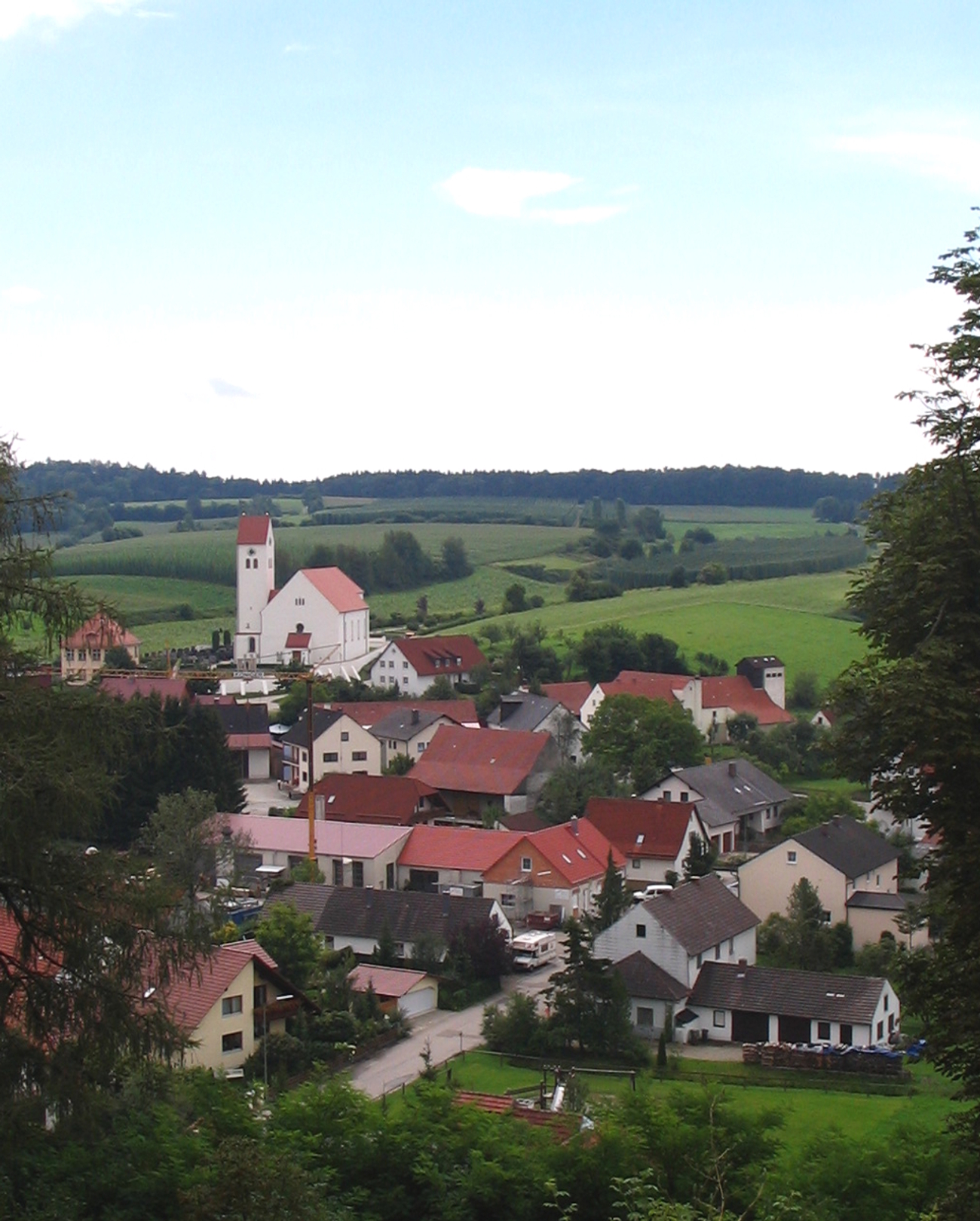
- View of Rottenegg

- Location in Bavaria
- Coordinates: 48.65°N 11.666667°E
- Country: Germany
- State: Bavaria
- Region: Upper Bavaria
- Municipality: Geisenfeld
- Elevation: 428 m (1,404 ft)
- Time zone: UTC+1 (CET)
  - Summer (DST): UTC+2 (CEST)
- Postal code: 85290

Rottenegg is a village in the Hallertau of Bavaria, Germany. Formerly a separate municipality, it is now part of the municipality of Geisenfeld in the Upper Bavarian district of Pfaffenhofen.

== Location ==
Rottenegg is located in the Danube-Isar Hills of the Lower Bavarian Upland. The village lies at 428 metres (1,404 ft) above sea level. It is 5.7 kilometres (3.5 mi) southeast of the Geisenfeld town center, and extends 1.1 kilometres (0.68 mi) in a northwest-southeast direction. Munich is 70 kilometres (43 mi) south of the village. The former municipality and present village of Rottenegg includes the hamlets of Hornlohe, Moosmühle and Brunn.

== History ==
From 1169 to 1279 the family of the Counts of Rotteneck were resident at this location, originally called Schermbach. They were descendants of the Lord of Abensberg. In 1220 Count Meinhard von Rotteneck, a grandson of Gebhard I von Abensberg, built a castle in Mainburg (about 10 kilometres (6.2 mi) to the east), the basis for that town. On 21 August 1279 the last male descendant of the family, Heinrich II von Rotteneck, the Bishop Count of Regensburg, sold Rottenegg castle and its possessions including the Mainburg castle to Duke Ludwig II of Bavaria so he could build his cathedral.

The castle of Rotteneck was expanded in 1551. In 1705 it was damaged during the War of the Spanish Succession (1701–1714). It was demolished in 1722-24. From then the castle was a ruin. In 1722 a church was built on the site in a picturesque location above the village, preserving a part of the castle wall. The French Brigadier General Henri François Lambert of the Army of the Rhine and Moselle who died on 7 September 1796 in Neustadt an der Donau is buried here. The piece of shrapnel that fatally injured him is kept in the village church of Mauern, Neustadt at his request.

On 1 January 1978 Rottenegg was incorporated into the town of Geisenfeld.

== Economy ==
Until the 1980s hop growing was an important occupation in Rottenegg, and many hop farms are found today, often abandoned. Modernization measures eliminated many jobs in this industry. Today, many farms are being converted for use in forestry.

== Associations ==
- Home Sports Club (Heimsportverein) Rottenegg
- Soldiers and veterans club
- Burschenverein
- Rottenegg Volunteer Fire Brigade

== Gallery ==
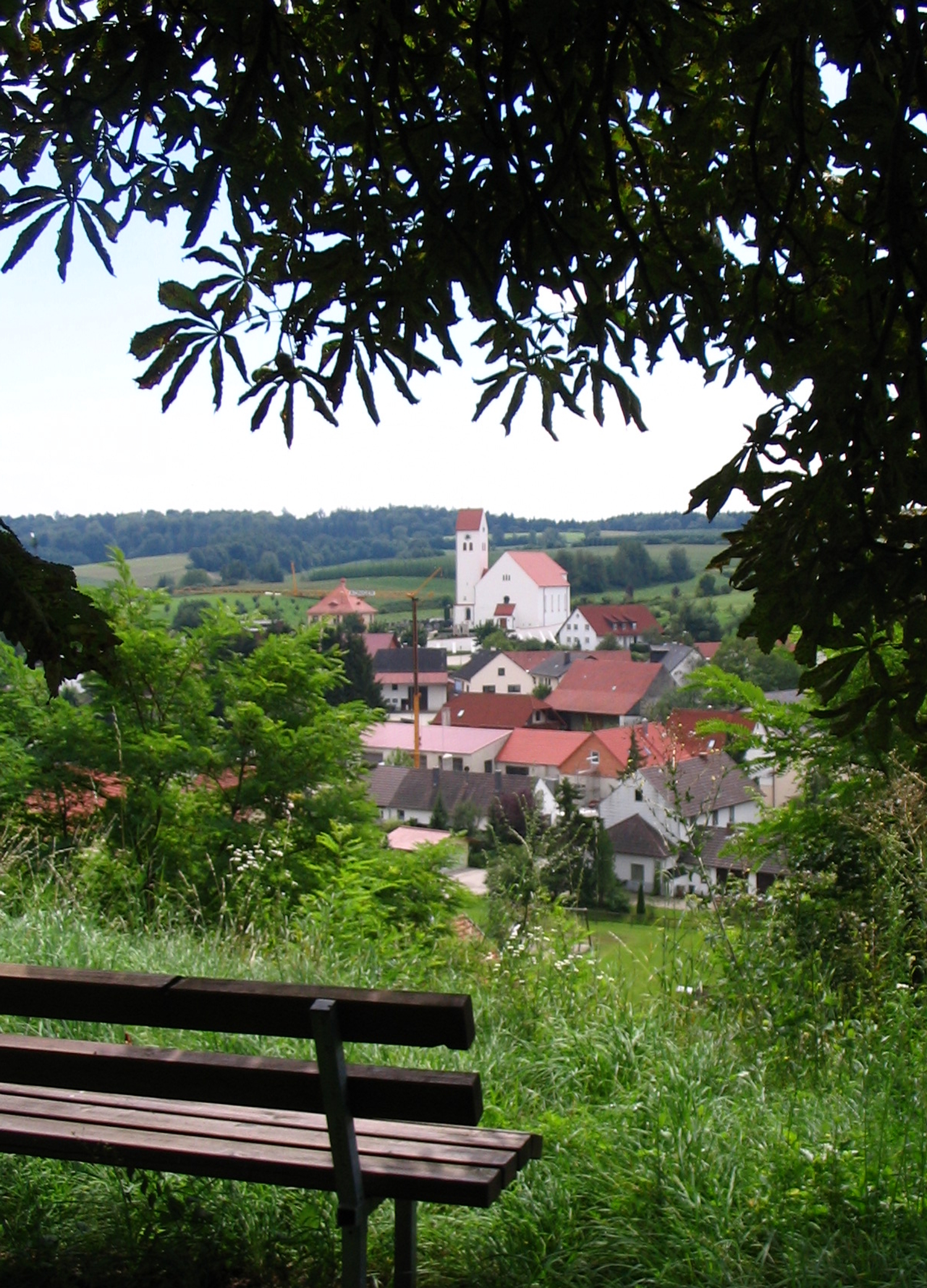
View of the village

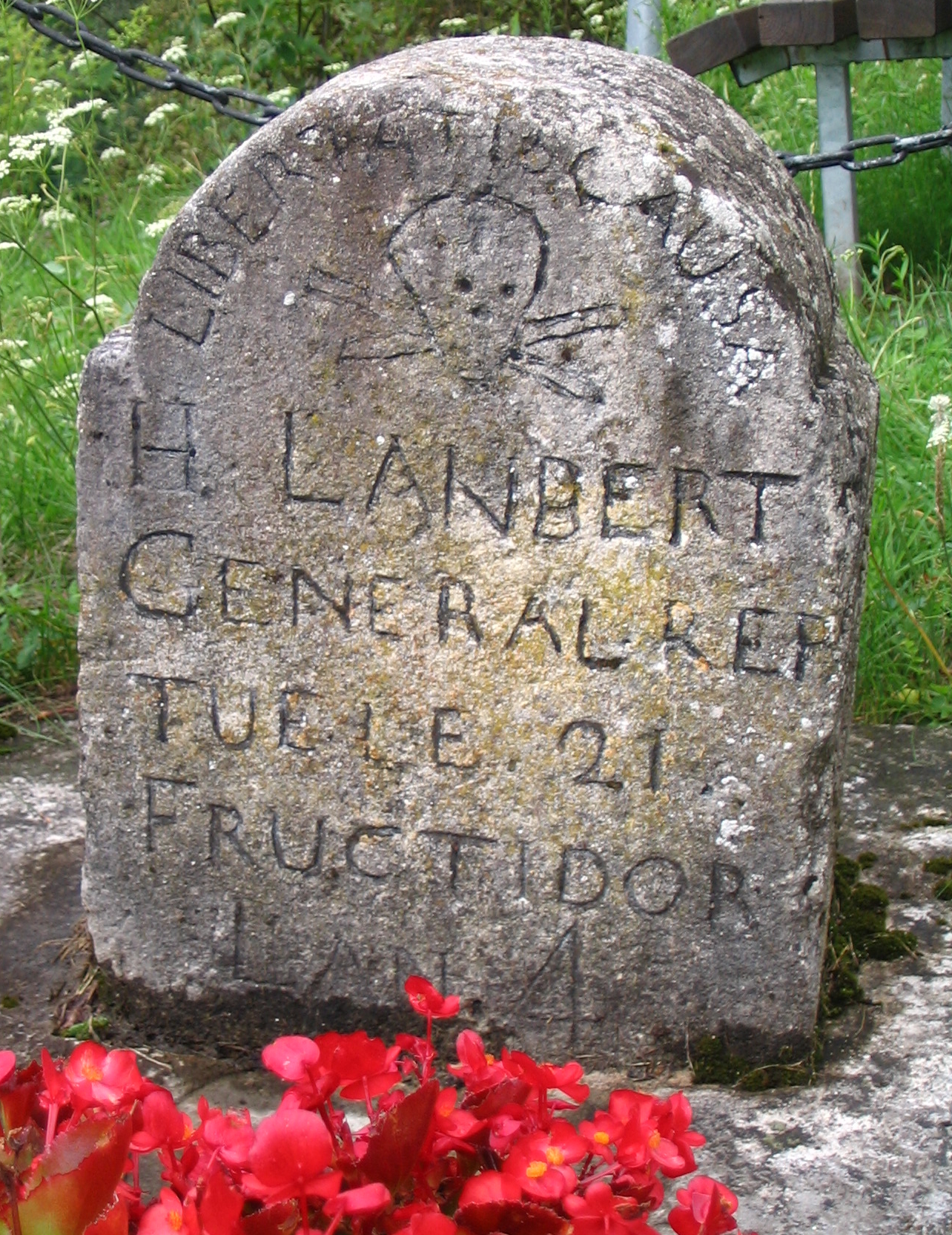
Gravestone of General H. Lambert

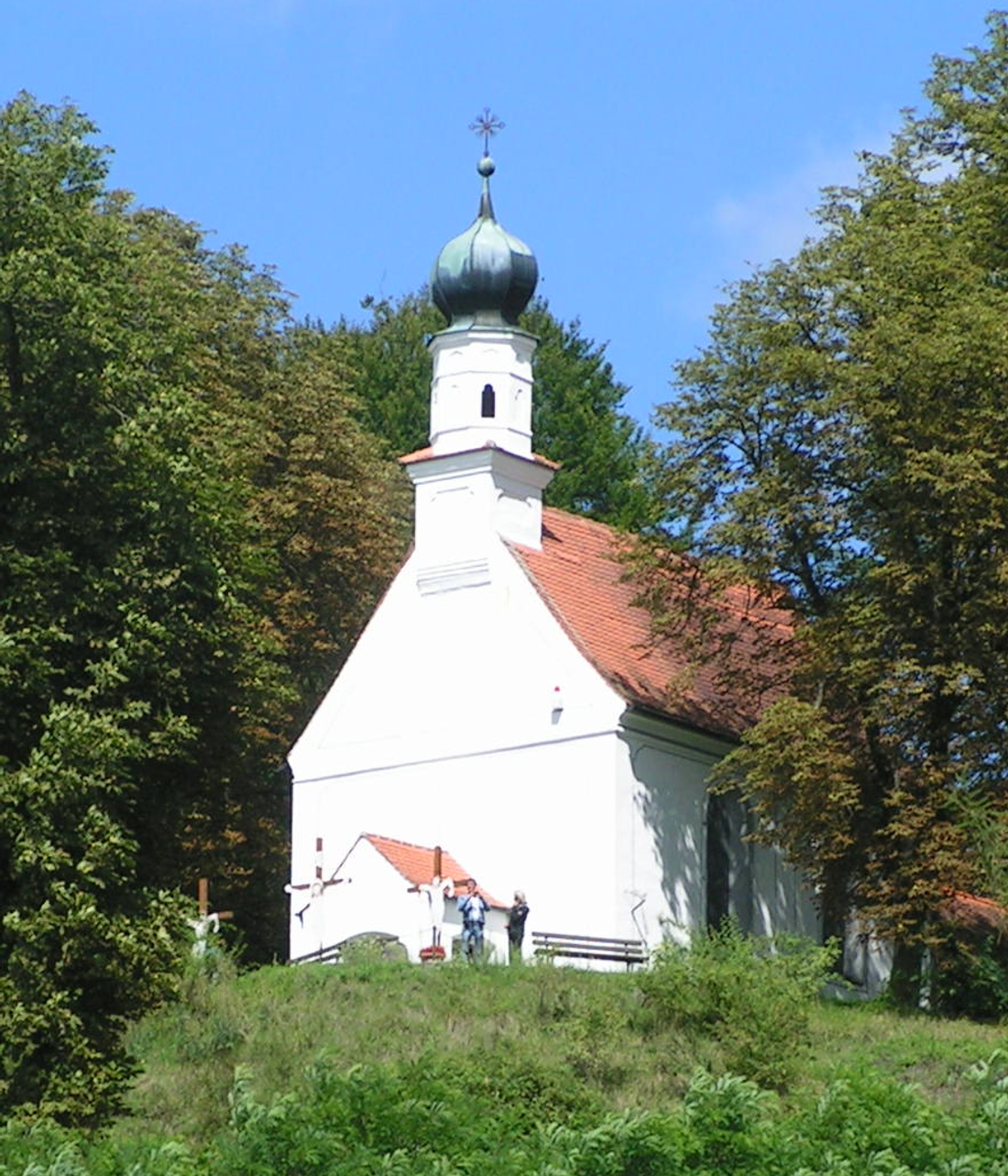
Mountain church
