= Arresting, Germany =

Coordinates: 48°52′N 11°44′E

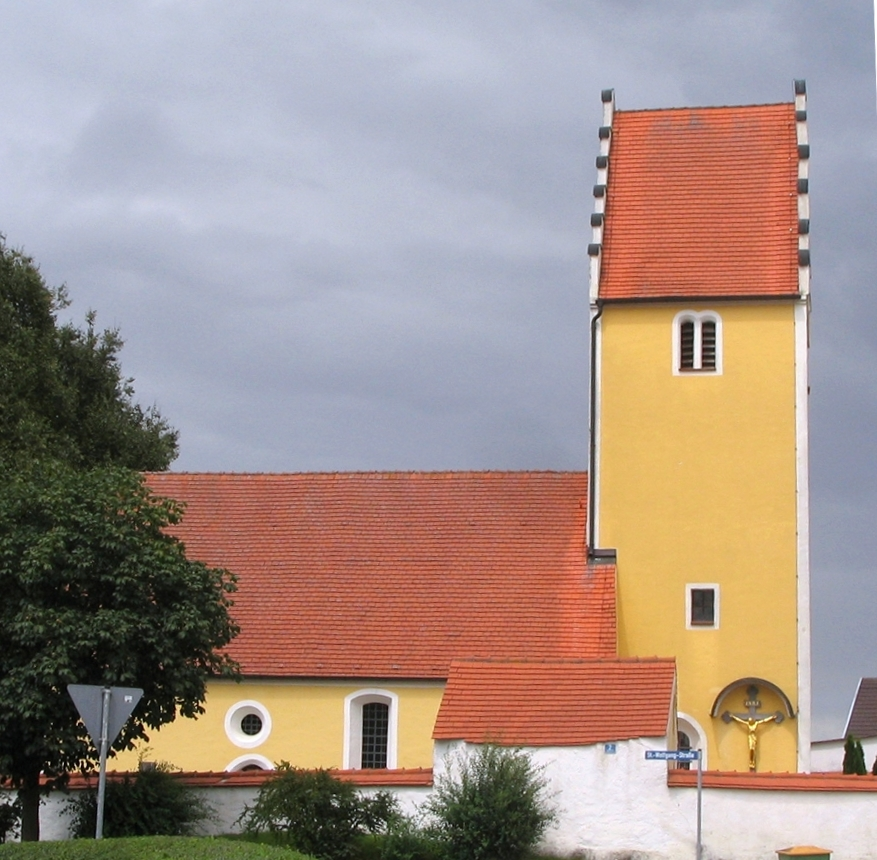
St. Wolfgang

Arresting is a small rural village, that is an Ortsteil of Neustadt an der Donau in the Kelheim district of Lower Bavaria. It is situated about 7 km north of Neustadt's center, on the left bank of the Danube. As of 1 April 2022 it has a population of 84.

== History ==
Arresting was first mentioned in 1086 as a settlement named Argistingin. its history dates back to the 6th and 7th centuries. The St. Wolfgang church was built in the second half of the 13th century. Around 1600, the church was extended to the south, and the gabled roof of the east tower, with its rounded merlons, was added. The altar in the church, dating from the 1730s, is in rococo style. The 16th century 'Karnerkapelle' is integrated into the graveyard's wall. It serves as an ossuary for human remains, including skulls, foot bones, and arm bones.

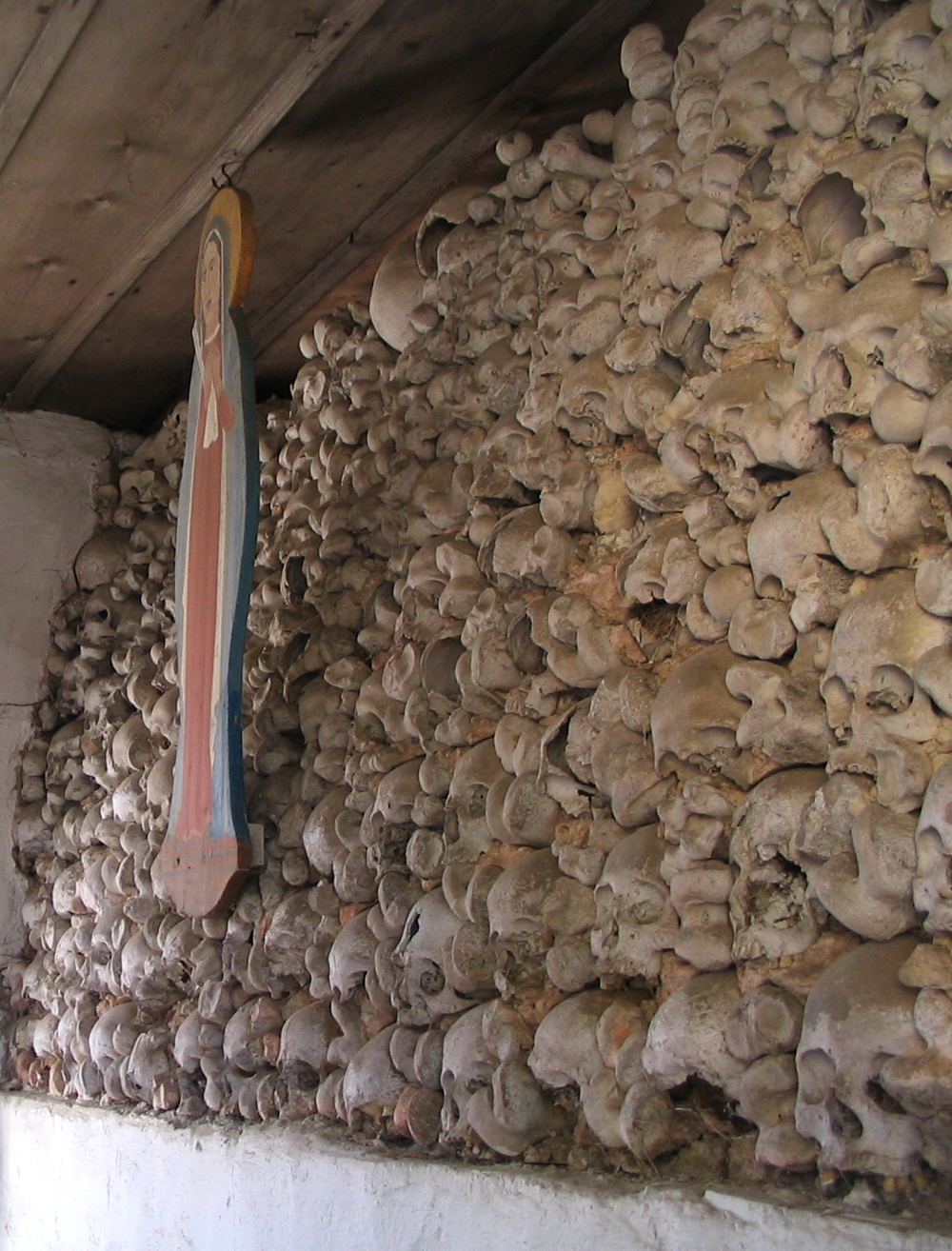
The Karnerkapelle

Arresting was the smallest independent municipality in the Kelheim district until it was merged with Neustadt in 1972.
