= Haraucourt, Meurthe-et-Moselle =

Haraucourt
- Commune
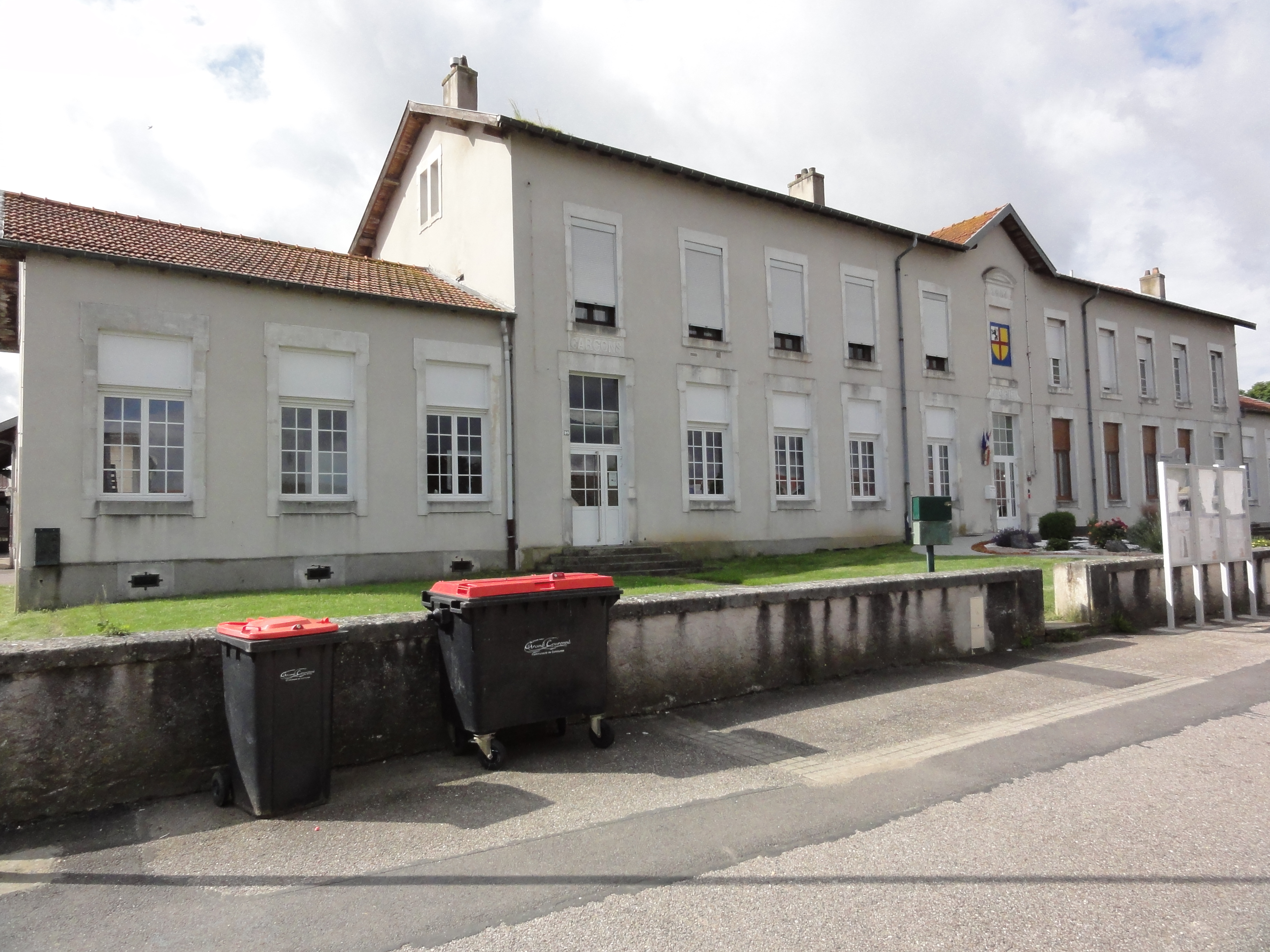
- The town hall and school in Haraucourt

- Coat of arms
- Location of Haraucourt
- Location within France Location within Grand Est
- Coordinates: 48°39′44″N 6°21′52″E
- Country: France
- Region: Grand Est
- Department: Meurthe-et-Moselle
- Arrondissement: Nancy
- Canton: Grand Couronné
- Intercommunality: CC Seille et Grand Couronné

Government
  - Mayor (2020–2026): Yannick Fagot-Revurat
- Area^{1}: 12.48 km^{2} (4.82 sq mi)
- Elevation: 268 m (879 ft)
- Highest elevation: 321 m (1,053 ft)
- Lowest elevation: 211 m (692 ft)
- Population (2023): 729
  - Density: 58.4/km^{2} (151/sq mi)
- Time zone: UTC+01:00 (CET)
  - Summer (DST): UTC+02:00 (CEST)
- INSEE/Postal code: 54250 /54110
- ^{1} French Land Register data, which excludes lakes, ponds, glaciers > 1 km^{2} (0.386 sq mi or 247 acres) and river estuaries.

Haraucourt (French pronunciation: [aʁokuʁ]) is a commune in the Meurthe-et-Moselle department in north-eastern France.

The commune covers an area of 12.48 km^{2} (4.82 sq mi). Yannick Fagot-Revurat is the mayor for the 2020-2026 tenure.

== See also ==
- Communes of the Meurthe-et-Moselle department
