= Eschelberg =

Town in Upper Austria, Austria

Coordinates: 48°23′N 14°08′E

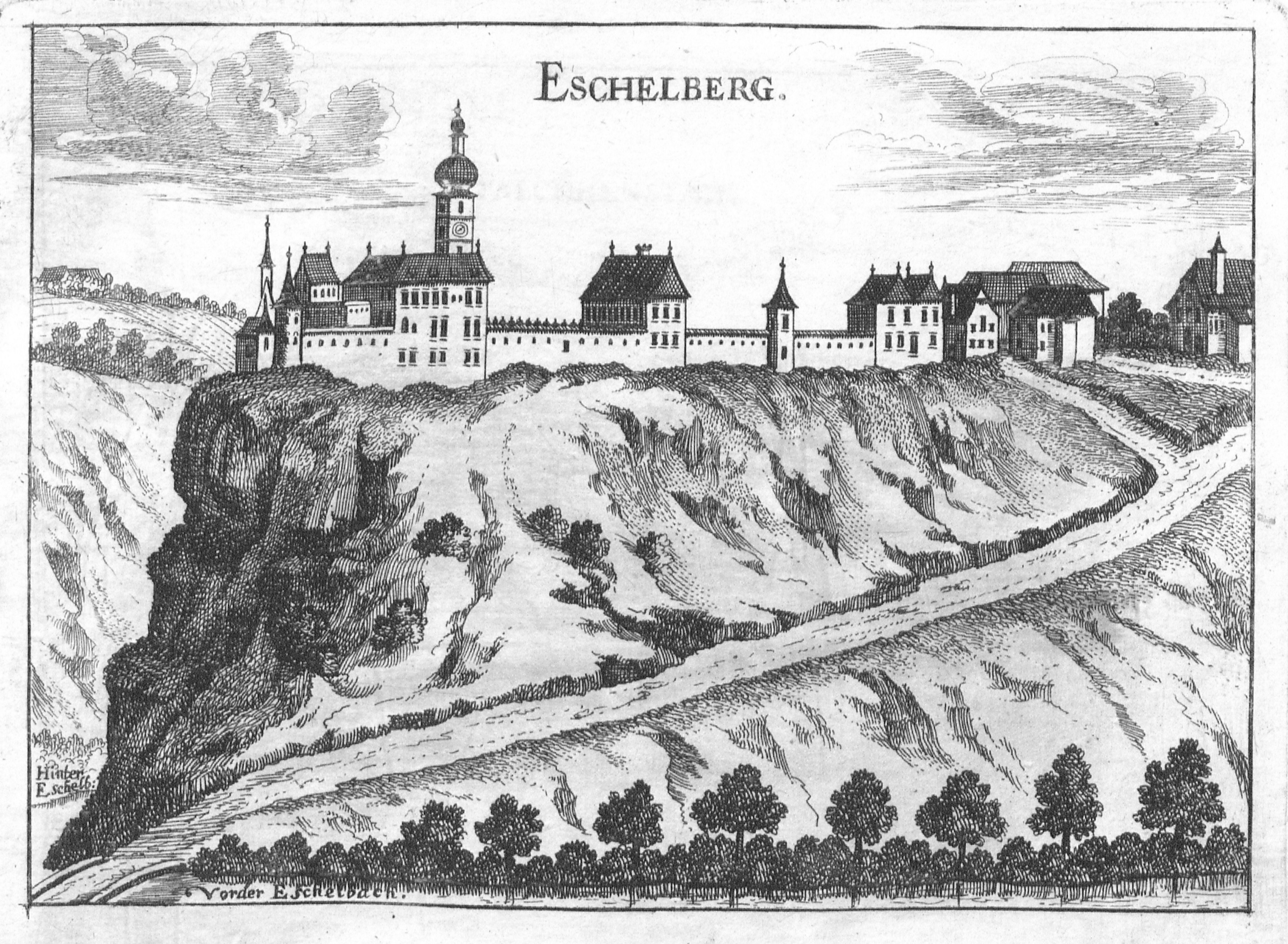
Eschelberg Castle in 1674, drawn by Georg Matthäus Vischer

Eschelberg is a town in Upper Austria, Austria. It is part of the municipality of Sankt Gotthard im Mühlkreis. The town was first fortified in 1206 and the castle there was built around 1598.
