= Rottenegg, Upper Austria =

Town in Austria

Rottenegg
- Village
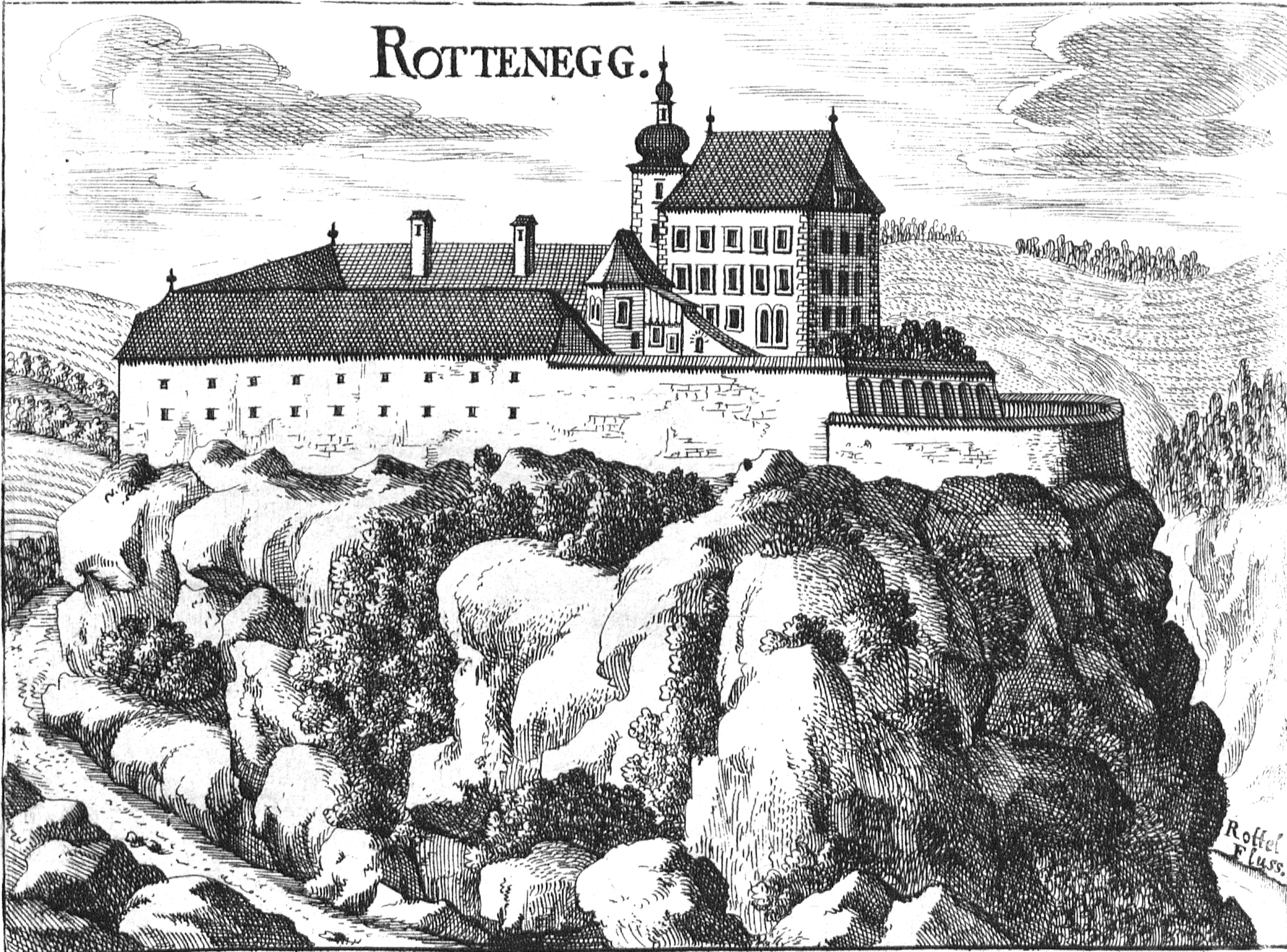
- Rottenegg Castle in 1674

- Location in Austria
- Coordinates: 48.368275°N 14.135025°E
- Country: Austria
- State: Upper Austria
- District: Urfahr-Umgebung
- Municipality: Sankt Gotthard im Mühlkreis
- Elevation: 473 m (1,552 ft)
- Time zone: UTC+1 (CET)
  - Summer (DST): UTC+2 (CEST)
- Postal code: 4112

Rottenegg (German pronunciation: [ɾɔʔənɛg]) is a village in the municipality of Sankt Gotthard im Mühlkreis, in Upper Austria. It is named after the now-ruined Rottenegg Castle, just east of the village.

Rottenegg is surrounded by hilly country and is a good area for hiking, with excellent views. It once lay on a Via Regia, a medieval trade route. The ruined castle is on a projecting rock promontory where the Kleinen Rodl enters the Großen Rodl river from the north, looking over the confluence. It guarded the old trade route. The village puts on the Rottenegg Cultural Summer Program each year, which includes cabarets, concerts and plays. The village is home to the Mühlviertler Heimatverein Rottenegg, a club that preserves folk dances and songs, and that puts on a play each year. The hall at the leisure center is also used for other events.

== See also ==
- Place names considered unusual
