= Arrested Development (disambiguation) =

Arrested Development is an American sitcom.

Arrested development or Arrested Development may also refer to:

- Arrested development, a medical term for stoppage of physical or mental development
- Arrested Development (group), an American alternative hip-hop group
- Arrested Development (radio series), a 2000 British radio series
- "Arrested Development", an episode of Ben 10: Omniverse

== See also ==
- Developmental disorder, a group of psychiatric conditions originating in childhood that involve serious impairment
- Neoteny, the retention of juvenile characteristics in the adult
