= Neustadt an der Donau =

Neustadt a.d.Donau
- Town
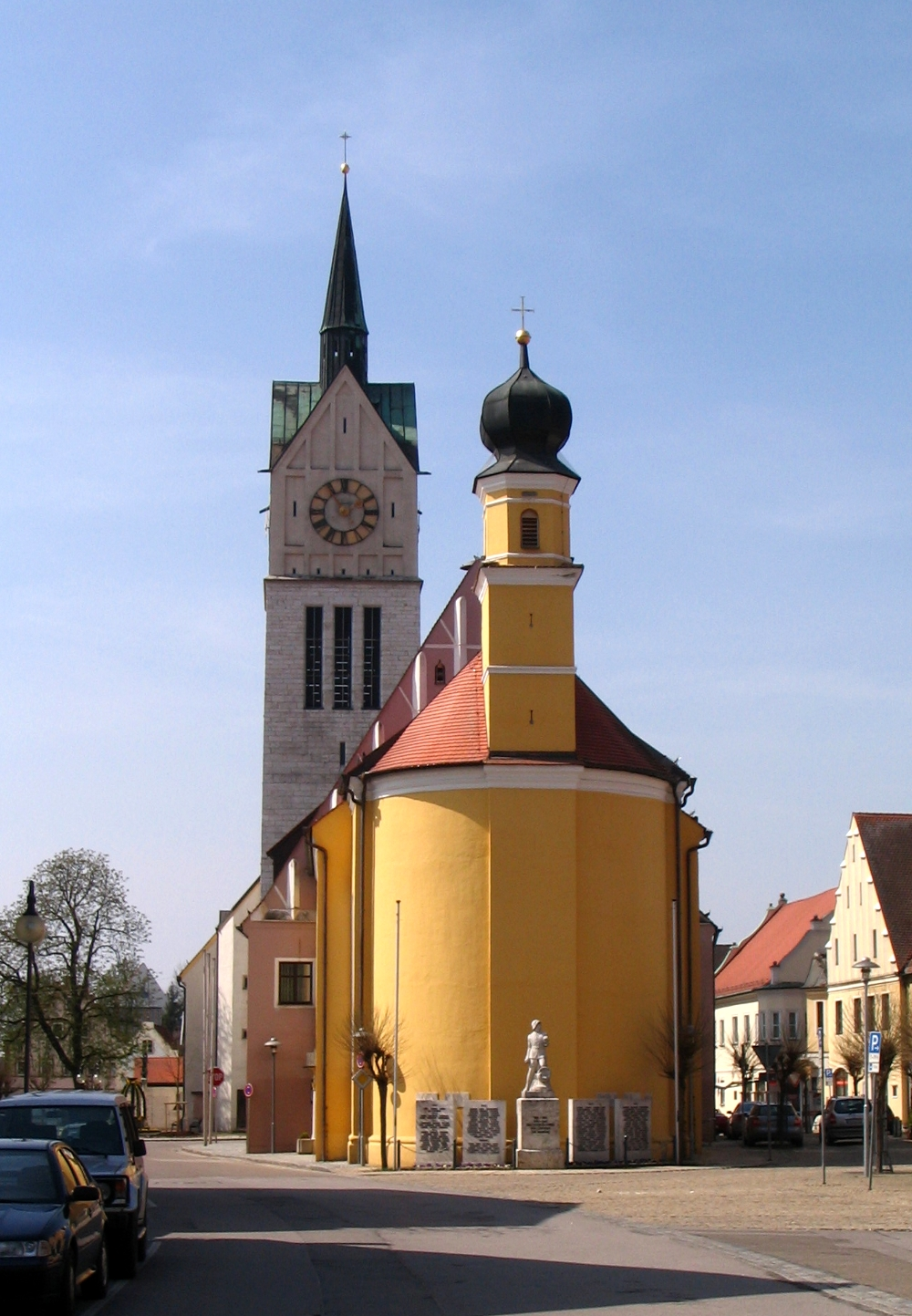
- Saint Lawrence Church and Saint Anne Chapel

- Coat of arms

- Location of Neustadt a.d.Donau within Kelheim district
- Interactive map of Neustadt a.d.Donau
- Location within Germany Location within Bavaria
- Coordinates: 48°48′N 11°46′E
- Country: Germany
- State: Bavaria
- Admin. region: Niederbayern
- District: Kelheim

Government
  - Mayor (2020–26): Thomas Memmel (CSU)

Area
  - Total: 93.55 km^{2} (36.12 sq mi)
- Elevation: 354 m (1,161 ft)

Population (2025-12-31)
  - Total: 14,891
  - Density: 159.2/km^{2} (412.3/sq mi)
- Time zone: UTC+01:00 (CET)
  - Summer (DST): UTC+02:00 (CEST)
- Postal codes: 93333
- Dialling codes: 09445; 09444 (Mühlhausen); 08402 (Schwaig, Umbertshausen)
- Vehicle registration: KEH
- Website: www.neustadt-donau.de

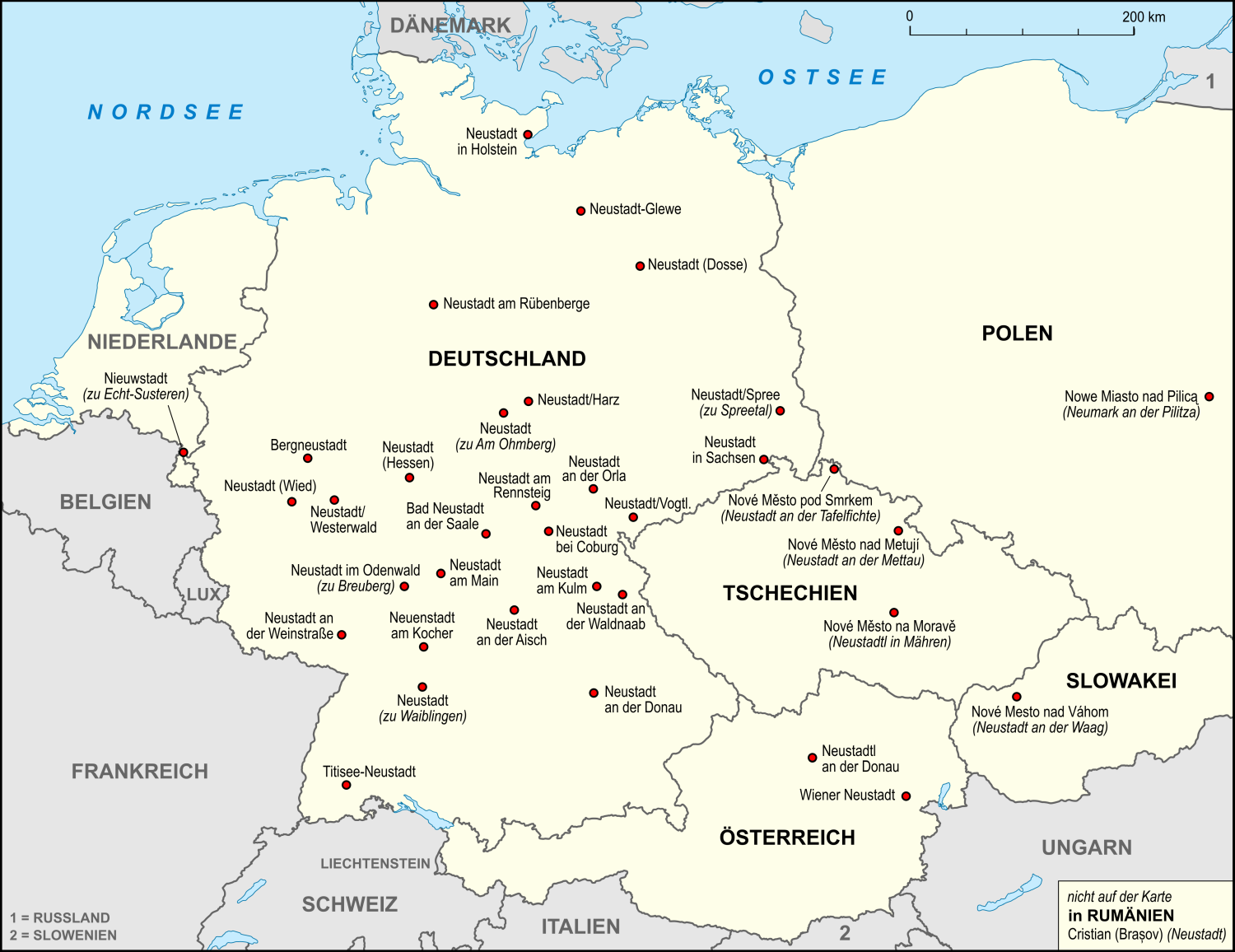
All the Neustadt in Europe

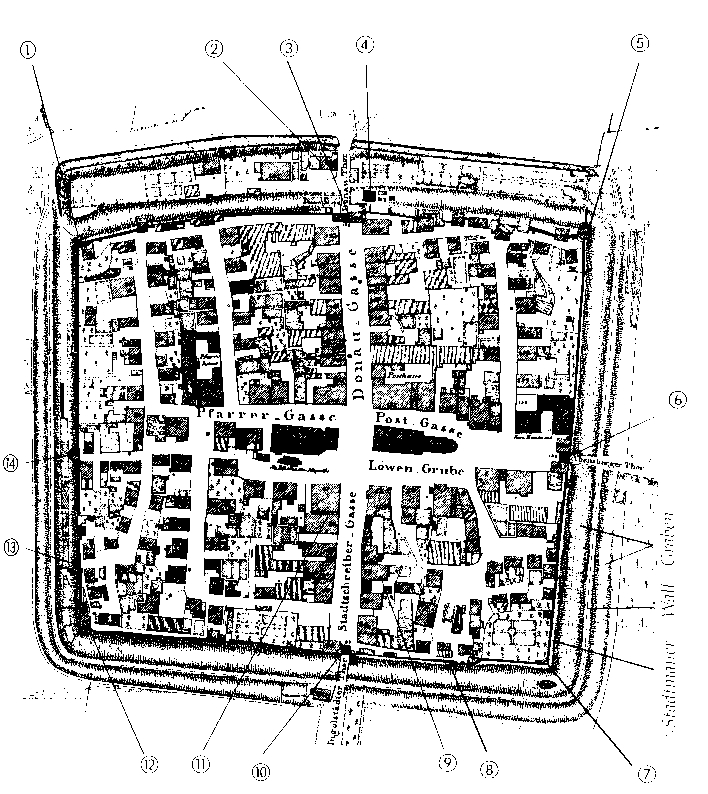
Plan of the city from 1819

Neustadt an der Donau (German pronunciation: [ˈnɔʏʃtat ʔan deːɐ̯ ˈdoːnaʊ]; Central Bavarian: Neistod an da Doana; both lit. 'New City on the Danube') is a town in Lower Bavaria on the Danube in Bavaria, Germany. Lying on the western border of Landkreis Kelheim, Neustadt is primarily known for the thermal spa Bad Gögging. Neustadt had a population of 12,753 as of December 31, 2003.

== Geography ==
The city is located halfway between Ingolstadt and Regensburg, on an approximately 5 kilometres (3.1 mi) wide gravel plain of the Danube valley, which at this point is south of the wooded foothills of the tertiary Donau-Isar hill country of the Hallertau and bounded on the north by the limestone slope of the southern Franconian Alb. The rivers Ilm and Abens flow into the Danube in the city.

The township includes 22 districts Arresting, Bad Gögging, Deisenhofen, Eining, Geibenstetten, Haderfleck, Heiligenstadt, Hienheim, Irnsing, Irnsing-Steinbruch, Karpfenstein, Lina, Marching, Mauern, Mulhouse, Niederulrain, Oberulrain, Schwaig, Sittling, Umbertshausen and Wöhr. The area heavily dominated by agriculture; asparagus and in particular hops play a special role. Neighboring communities of Neustadt are Abensberg, Altmannstein, Biburg, Kelheim, Mindelstetten, Münchsmünster, Pförring and Siegenburg.

== History ==
The oldest documented area of Neustadt was the village of Trephenau. Under the name Seligenstadt the town charter was granted in May 1273 by Duke Ludwig II. This town charter is the oldest in Bavaria. With the town survey and the consequent new investment and resettlement Duke Ludwig II secured the Danube Valley road and the river crossing. The town charter is one of many granted by early Wittelsbach dukes as part of a planned foundation of towns. Neustadt was first mentioned by that name in a document of Abbot Conrad of Weltenburg from 1277.

The settlement of Wöhr, just outside the city gate on the bank of the Danube, is actually older than Neustadt. The name derives from the Middle High German Wert, signifying an island of elevated dry land. Wöhr was incorporated in the late Middle Ages as part of the city of Neustadt and residents of Wöhr could be citizens of the city, but lived outside the fortification. Wöhr was also the seat of the noble family of the Lords of Wöhr and the ducal Urbar Office "ze Werde" that managed the natural and monetary levies from the ducal estates.

== Population ==
Historical population

Year	Pop.	±%
1840	4,631	—
1871	5,346	+15.4%
1900	5,563	+4.1%
1925	6,172	+10.9%
1939	6,378	+3.3%
1950	8,065	+26.5%
1961	7,678	−4.8%
1970	9,153	+19.2%
1987	9,811	+7.2%

Year	Pop.	±%
2003	12,753	+30.0%
2012	12,900	+1.2%
2015	13,670	+6.0%
2016	13,797	+0.9%
2017	14,045	+1.8%
2018	14,409	+2.6%
2019	14,604	+1.4%
2020	14,493	−0.8%

== Sport ==
The Anton Treffer Stadion is a multi-purpose stadium, on the intersection of Am Volksfestplatz and Bad Gögginger Strasse. The stadium is used by the MSC Neustadt speedway team for motorcycle speedway and TSV Neustadt for football. The facility has hosted many important events, including qualifying rounds of the Speedway World Championship the Speedway World Pairs Championship and a qualifying round of the Speedway World Team Cup. In recent years due to noise complaints and legal disputes the stadium only hosts two motorsport events each year.

== Personalities ==
- Eberhard of Salzburg (* around 1085 in Sittling-1164 in the Cistercian monastery Rein), Archbishop of Salzburg from 1147 to 1164, was venerated as a holy
- Wilhelm Sander (died 1973 in Neustadt an der Donau), manufacturer and donor
- Jürgen Wittmann (born 1966 in Neustadt an der Donau), German football goalkeeper
