= 1995–96 DFB-Pokal =

Tournament details
- Country: Germany
- Teams: 64

Final positions
- Champions: 1. FC Kaiserslautern
- Runners-up: Karlsruher SC

Tournament statistics
- Matches played: 63
- Top goal scorer(s): Vladimir Beschastnykh; Pavel Kuka; Thomas Häßler (4)

The 1995–96 DFB-Pokal was the 53rd season of the annual German football cup competition. 64 teams competed in the tournament of six rounds which began on 15 August 1995 and ended on 24 May 1996. In the final, 1. FC Kaiserslautern defeated Karlsruher SC 1–0 thereby claiming their second title. In the first round, SV 1916 Sandhausen defeated VfB Stuttgart 13–12 on penalties, marking the game with the most goals in German professional football ever.

== Matches ==
Times up to 23 September 1995 and from 31 March 1996 are CEST (UTC+2). Times from 24 September 1995 to 30 March 1996 are CET (UTC+1).

=== First round ===
15 August 1995	TSG Pfeddersheim	1–1 (a.e.t.) (2–3 p)	Borussia Dortmund
	Winkler 119'	Report (in German)	Möller 100'	Attendance: 25,500; Referee: Alfons Berg (Konz)
	Penalties
	Ruh (penalty scored); Winkler (penalty scored); Mack (penalty missed); Schantz (penalty missed); Biagioli (penalty missed)		Herrlich (penalty scored); Júlio César (penalty scored); Möller (penalty missed); Reinhardt (penalty scored)

22 August 1995	Fortuna Köln	3–4 (a.e.t.)	1. FC Kaiserslautern	Cologne
	Hey 65'; Svinggaard 90', 111'	Report (in German)	Kuka 25'; Marschall 90'; Wagner 95'; Flock 118'	Stadium: Südstadion; Attendance: 9,000; Referee: Lutz Pohlmann (Felde)

24 August 1995	SSV Ulm 1846	2–3 (a.e.t.)	Chemnitzer FC	Ulm
	Trkulja 55'; Chylek 109'	Report (in German)	Gütschow 52'; Meißner 112', 114'	Stadium: Donaustadion; Attendance: 1,500; Referee: Herbert Fandel (Kyllburg)

25 August 1995	FV Zeulenroda	0–1	FSV Zwickau	Zeulenroda
		Report (in German)	Pilz 8'	Attendance: 2,500; Referee: Schiebel (Calbe)

25 August 1995	Werder Bremen (A)	0–2	SpVgg Unterhaching	Bremen
		Report (in German)	Oberleitner 31'; Bucher 85'	Stadium: Weserstadion, Platz 11; Attendance: 700; Referee: Bernd Domurat (Datteln)

25 August 1995	FC Homburg	2–1	FC St. Pauli	Homburg
	Theres 102'; Goumai 108'	Report (in German)	Springer 114'	Stadium: Waldstadion; Attendance: 3,000; Referee: Holger Dehmelt (Sabachwalden)

25 August 1995	1. FC Nürnberg	2–1	Hansa Rostock	Nuremberg
	Čović 66'; Knäbel 78'	Report (in German)	Baumgart 41'	Stadium: Frankenstadion; Attendance: 10,500; Referee: Günther Frey (Neu-Ulm)

25 August 1995	Dynamo Dresden	1–3	Fortuna Düsseldorf	Dresden
	Schmidt 79'	Report (in German)	Mill 48', 64'; Braun 64' (o.g.)	Stadium: Rudolf-Harbig-Stadion; Attendance: 11,600; Referee: Thomas Rüdiger (Bad Salzdetfurth)

25 August 1995	VfL Osnabrück	0–1	Waldhof Mannheim	Osnabrück
		Report (in German)	Akpoborie 116'	Stadium: Stadion an der Bremer Brücke; Attendance: 4,000; Referee: Jansen (Dormagen)

25 August 1995	SV 1920 Mettlach	0–4	Hertha BSC	Mettlach
		Report (in German)	Süs 6'; Ramelow 41', 43'; Rath 56'	Attendance: 2,500; Referee: Bastian (Frankfurt)

26 August 1995	FSV Frankfurt	1–3	Carl Zeiss Jena	Frankfurt
	Ouedraogo 90'	Report (in German)	Cramer 9'; Durić 25' (o.g.); Zimmermann 70'	Stadium: Frankfurter Volksbank Stadion; Attendance: 7,000; Referee: Jörg Hotop (Cologne)

26 August 1995	SpVgg Beckum	0–0 (a.e.t.) (4–3 p)	1. FC Köln	Beckum
		Report (in German)		Attendance: 7,000; Referee: Uwe Kemmling (Kleinburgwedel)
	Penalties
	Hardes (penalty scored); Klingen (penalty scored); Korek (penalty scored); Graskamp (penalty scored); Beckstedde (penalty missed)		Polster (penalty scored); Kohn (penalty scored); Dollberg (penalty missed); Steinmann (penalty scored); Labbadia (penalty missed)

26 August 1995	Greifswalder SC	4–1	VfB Lübeck	Greifswald
	Klein 32' (pen.), 90'; Schedlinski 80'; Vogel 88'	Report (in German)	Van der Steen 78'	Stadium: Volksstadion; Attendance: 1,500; Referee: Augar (Berlin)

26 August 1995	Heider SV	1–6	SC Freiburg	Heide
	Losse 90'	Report (in German)	Zeyer 12'; Rath 37'; Sundermann 47' (pen.); Burić 55'; Korell 64'; Wassmer 88'	Stadium: HSV Stadion; Attendance: 7,400; Referee: Torsten Koop (Lüttenmark)

26 August 1995	SSV Vorsfelde	0–5	Schalke 04	Wolfsburg
		Report (in German)	Weidemann 3', 55'; Nemec 33'; Mulder 68', 84'	Stadium: Drömlingstadion; Attendance: 8,000; Referee: Olaf Blumenstein (Berlin)

26 August 1995	1. FC Nürnberg (A)	0–3	Borussia Mönchengladbach	Nuremberg
		Report (in German)	Effenberg 32'; Pflipsen 62'; Sternkopf 86'	Attendance: 5,600; Referee: Norbert Dörr (Griesheim)

26 August 1995	SC Neukirchen	2–2 (a.e.t.) (3–4 p)	Mainz 05	Neukirchen
	Liebers 23'; Özcan 90'	Report (in German)	Fritz 4'; Zinnbauer 83'	Attendance: 2,500; Referee: Jörg Keßler (Höhenkirchen)
	Penalties
	Liebers (penalty scored); Müller (penalty missed); Walper (penalty scored); Cakici (penalty scored); Buvač (penalty missed)		Ziemer (penalty scored); Akrapović (penalty scored); Hock (penalty missed); Weiß (penalty missed); Kunert (penalty scored)

26 August 1995	1. SC Norderstedt	0–1	SG Wattenscheid 09	Norderstedt
		Report (in German)	Beyel 79'	Attendance: 1,500; Referee: Michael Weiner (Giesen)

26 August 1995	VfB Gaggenau	1–6	1860 Munich	Gaggenau
	Antunovic 61'	Report (in German)	Lesniak 11', 45'; Schwabl 22'; Heldt 70'; Rydlewicz 78', 86'	Attendance: 5,000; Referee: Volker Wezel (Tübingen)

26 August 1995	FSV Salmrohr	0–2	VfB Leipzig	Salmtal
		Report (in German)	Lindner 45'; Rische 90'	Attendance: 1,500; Referee: Jörg Friedrichs (Ilvesheim)

26 August 1995	Sachsen Leipzig	2–1	VfL Bochum	Leipzig
	Leitzke 3'; Gräfe 29'	Report (in German)	Wohlfarth 63'	Attendance: 4,000; Referee: Helmut Fleischer (Ulm)

26 August 1995	Bayern Munich (A)	0–1	Werder Bremen	Munich
		Report (in German)	Beschastnykh 88'	Stadium: Stadion an der Grünwalder Strasse; Attendance: 2,500; Referee: Frank Fleske (Eisenhüttenstadt)

26 August 1995	Energie Cottbus	1–2	SV Meppen	Cottbus
	Kubis 81'	Report (in German)	Snyders 15', 44'	Stadium: Stadion der Freundschaft; Attendance: 2,500; Referee: Norbert Haupt (Berlin)

26 August 1995	Tennis Borussia Berlin	1–2	Karlsruher SC	Berlin
	Isa 38'	Report (in German)	Fink 32'; Bilić 89'	Stadium: Mommsenstadion; Attendance: 5,100; Referee: Michael Malbranc (Hamburg)

26 August 1995	Arminia Bielefeld	2–1	Hamburger SV	Bielefeld
	Maul 48'; Bode 62'	Report (in German)	Claaßen 58'	Stadium: Bielefelder Alm; Attendance: 18,500; Referee: Edgar Steinborn (Sinzig)

26 August 1995	MSV Duisburg	0–2	Bayer Leverkusen	Duisburg
		Report (in German)	Kirsten 73'; Völler 88'	Stadium: Wedaustadion; Attendance: 11,500; Referee: Hans-Jürgen Kasper (Katlenburg)

26 August 1995	Rot-Weiss Essen	2–0	Hannover 96	Essen
	Wuckel 7', 49'	Report (in German)		Stadium: Georg-Melches-Stadion; Attendance: 10,100; Referee: Wagner (Hofheim)

27 August 1995	1. FC Saarbrücken	1–2 (a.e.t.)	Eintracht Frankfurt	Saarbrücken
	Flick 89'	Report (in German)	Götz 3' (o.g.); Binz 101'	Stadium: Ludwigsparkstadion; Attendance: 6,500; Referee: Thomas Leimert (Ludwigshafen)

27 August 1995	SV Sandhausen	2–2 (a.e.t.) (13–12 p)	VfB Stuttgart	Sandhausen
	Bernhardt 37'; Staletović 87'	Report (in German)	Balakov 11'; Bobic 51'	Stadium: Hardtwaldstadion; Attendance: 5,200; Referee: Winfried Buchhart (Schrobenhausen)
	Penalties
	Hahn (penalty scored); Feucht (penalty scored); Merkel (penalty scored); Lässig (penalty scored); Ehmann (penalty scored); Fridemann (penalty scored); Pukallus (penalty scored); Mirwald (penalty scored); Wollner (penalty scored); Staletović (penalty scored); Reiser (penalty scored); Hahn (penalty scored); Feucht (penalty scored)		Balakov (penalty scored); Berhold (penalty scored); Herzog (penalty scored); Grimm (penalty scored); Foda (penalty scored); Buck (penalty scored); Kruse (penalty scored); Schneider (penalty scored); Poschner (penalty scored); Ziegler (penalty scored); Balakov (penalty scored); Berthold (penalty scored); Herzog (penalty missed)

27 August 1995	1. FC Köln (A)	0–2	KFC Uerdingen	Köln
		Report (in German)	Heintze 28'; Steffen 65'	Stadium: Franz-Kremer-Stadion; Attendance: 2,000; Referee: Wolfgang Friedrichs (Lennestadt)

27 August 1995	Stuttgarter Kickers	0–1	Bayern Munich	Stuttgart
		Report (in German)	Babbel 39'	Attendance: 25,000; Referee: Markus Merk (Otterbach)

27 August 1995	Lokomotive/Altmark Stendal	0–0 (a.e.t.) (4–3 p)	VfL Wolfsburg	Stendal
		Report (in German)		Stadium: Stadion am Hölzchen; Attendance: 2,000; Referee: Lutz Michael Frohlich (Berlin)
	Penalties
	Wiedemann (penalty scored); Buchheim (penalty missed); Aurich (penalty scored); Lenz (penalty scored); Hoffmann (penalty scored)		Lieberam (penalty scored); Mauscksch (penalty scored); Meißner (penalty missed); Dammeier (penalty scored); Reich (penalty missed)

=== Second round ===
18 September 1995	Fortuna Düsseldorf	3–1	Bayern Munich	Düsseldorf
	Pančev 22'; Cyroń 79'; Seeliger 90'	Report (in German)	Helmer 73'	Stadium: Rheinstadion; Attendance: 45,000; Referee: Alfons Berg (Konz)

19 September 1995	VfB Leipzig	0–1	Schalke 04	Leipzig
		Report (in German)	Mulder 60'	Stadium: Bruno-Plache-Stadion; Attendance: 11,300; Referee: Burkhard Hufgard (Mömbris)

19 September 1995	SpVgg Beckum	2–3	SpVgg Unterhaching	Beckum
	Otten 42'; Klingen 88'	Report (in German)	Grassow 11'; Garcia 18', 30'	Attendance: 2,500; Referee: Bernd Hauer (Celle)

19 September 1995	Borussia Dortmund	3–0	KFC Uerdingen	Dortmund
	Ricken 65'; Tretschok 81'; Zorc 90'	Report (in German)		Stadium: Westfalenstadion; Attendance: 32,800; Referee: Jürgen Aust (Cologne)

19 September 1995	1. FC Kaiserslautern	3–0	SG Wattenscheid 09	Kaiserslautern
	Koch 74'; Kuka 82'; Hengen 90'	Report (in German)		Stadium: Betzenbergstadion; Attendance: 10,300; Referee: Hans Scheuerer (Munich)

19 September 1995	SC Freiburg	1–0	Arminia Bielefeld	Freiburg
	Zeyer 74'	Report (in German)		Stadium: Dreisamstadion; Attendance: 14,000; Referee: Hermann Albrecht (Kaufbeuren)

19 September 1995	1. FC Nürnberg	2–1	SV Meppen	Nuremberg
	Moore 24' (pen.); Möckel 82'	Report (in German)	Bujan 61'	Stadium: Frankenstadion; Attendance: 10,400; Referee: Müller (Dresden)

19 September 1995	1860 Munich	5–1	Eintracht Frankfurt	Munich
	Winkler 20', 63', 64'; Rydlewicz 23'; Stević 77'	Report (in German)	Okocha 87'	Attendance: 11,000; Referee: Hans-Peter Best (Kämpfelbach)

20 September 1995	Greifswalder SC	1–4	Rot-Weiss Essen	Greifswald
	Gerth 54'	Report (in German)	Helmig 12'; Klein 41', 48', 89'	Stadium: Volksstadion; Attendance: 1,600; Referee: Frank Fleske (Eisenhüttenstadt)

20 September 1995	Sachsen Leipzig	0–2	Karlsruher SC	Leipzig
		Report (in German)	Häßler 37' (pen.); Bender 73'	Attendance: 6,500; Referee: Hans-Jürgen Weber (Essen)

20 September 1995	SV Sandhausen	1–2	FC Homburg	Sandhausen
	Feucht 70' (pen.)	Report (in German)	Adriano 20'; Behlil 65'	Stadium: Hardtwaldstadion; Attendance: 2,000; Referee: Schütz (Bölsberg)

20 September 1995	Carl Zeiss Jena	2–5	Chemnitzer FC	Jena
	Schneider 42'; Sugzda 88'	Report (in German)	Penzel 20' (o.g.); Gütschow 58'; Hecker 61'; Fuchs 74'; Meißner 84'	Stadium: Ernst-Abbe-Sportfeld; Attendance: 2,300; Referee: Ralf Hilmes (Nordhorn)

20 September 1995	Bayer Leverkusen	2–0	Borussia Mönchengladbach	Leverkusen
	Fach 19'; Kirsten 90'	Report (in German)		Stadium: Ulrich-Haberland-Stadion; Attendance: 23,000; Referee: Rainer Werthmann (Bochum)

20 September 1995	Mainz 05	2–3	Werder Bremen	Mainz
	Höck 16'; Ziemer 64'	Report (in German)	Bode 32'; Beschastnykh 38', 82'	Stadium: Stadion am Bruchweg; Attendance: 8,400; Referee: Günther Habermann (Weißensee)

20 September 1995	Waldhof Mannheim	2–0	FSV Zwickau	Mannheim
	Hayer 20'; Seifert 45' (o.g.)	Report (in German)		Attendance: 4,500; Referee: Frank Gettke (Haltern)

20 September 1995	Lokomotive/Altmark Stendal	3–2 (a.e.t.)	Hertha BSC	Stendal
	Hoffmann 59'; Dau 100'; Wiedemann 117'	Report (in German)	Karl 12'; Graziani 119'	Stadium: Stadion am Hölzchen; Attendance: 2,200; Referee: Dr. Kiefer (Neubrandenburg)

=== Round of 16 ===
3 October 1995	1. FC Kaiserslautern	1–0	Schalke 04	Kaiserslautern
	Koch 42'	Report (in German)		Stadium: Betzenbergstadion; Attendance: 22,100; Referee: Bernd Heynemann (Magdeburg)

3 October 1995	1. FC Nürnberg	3–2	Werder Bremen	Nuremberg
	Moore 49'; Kurth 58'; Straube 90'	Report (in German)	Beschastnykh 8'; Basler 19'	Stadium: Frankenstadion; Attendance: 35,000; Referee: Hellmut Krug (Gelsenkirchen)

3 October 1995	FC Homburg	2–1	1860 Munich	Homburg
	Stanić 22'; Nemsadze 69'	Report (in German)	Borimirov 47'	Stadium: Waldstadion; Attendance: 8,000; Referee: Michael Prengel (Düsseldorf)

3 October 1995	Lokomotive/Altmark Stendal	2–2 (a.e.t.) (5–4 p)	Waldhof Mannheim	Stendal
	Wiedemann 33'; Hoffmann 71'	Report (in German)	Eroglu 31'; Hofmann 49'	Stadium: Stadion am Hölzchen; Attendance: 6,000; Referee: Lutz Michael Frohlich (Berlin)
	Penalties
	Wiedemann (penalty scored); Lenz (penalty scored); Aurich (penalty scored); Dau (penalty scored); Grempler (penalty scored); Bergen (penalty scored)		Zeyer (penalty scored); Reichel (penalty scored); Nachtweih (penalty scored); Dehoust (penalty missed); Akpoborie (penalty scored); Gerlach (penalty missed)

4 October 1995	SC Freiburg	0–1 (a.e.t.)	Borussia Dortmund	Freiburg
		Report (in German)	Herrlich 109'	Stadium: Dreisamstadion; Attendance: 22,500; Referee: Hartmut Strampe (Handorf)

4 October 1995	SpVgg Unterhaching	2–3	Karlsruher SC	Munich
	Oberleitner 20'; Hartig 84' (pen.)	Report (in German)	Reich 42'; Knup 48'; Häßler 74'	Stadium: Stadion am Sportpark; Attendance: 5,000; Referee: Uwe Kemmling (Kleinburgwedel)

4 October 1995	Fortuna Düsseldorf	3–1	Chemnitzer FC	Düsseldorf
	Werner 58'; Minkwitz 63'; Bach 86'	Report (in German)	Fuchs 28'	Stadium: Rheinstadion; Attendance: 10,000; Referee: Wagner (Hofheim)

4 October 1995	Rot-Weiss Essen	4–4 (a.e.t.) (1–4 p)	Bayer Leverkusen	Essen
	Helmig 42', 76'; Dondera 57', 76'	Report (in German)	Feldhoff 36'; Paulo Sérgio 48'; Fach 63'; Völler 76'	Stadium: Georg-Melches-Stadion; Attendance: 21,900; Referee: Winfried Burchhart (Schrobenhausen)
	Penalties
	Helmig (penalty missed); Schreier (penalty scored); Thiele (penalty missed)		Lupescu (penalty scored); Neuendorf (penalty scored); Ramon (penalty scored); Schuster (penalty scored)

=== Quarter-finals ===
31 October 1995	Lokomotive/Altmark Stendal	0–0 (a.e.t.) (4–5 p)	Bayer Leverkusen	Stendal
		Report (in German)		Stadium: Stadion am Hölzchen; Attendance: 12,000; Referee: Hermann Albrecht (Kaufbeuren)
	Penalties
	Wiedemann (penalty scored); Aurich (penalty missed); Topor (penalty scored); Dau (penalty scored); Hoffmann (penalty scored); Bergen (penalty missed)		Lupescu (penalty scored); Barnes (penalty missed); Münch (penalty scored); Schuster (penalty scored); Völler (penalty scored); Paulo Sérgio (penalty scored)

7 November 1995	Fortuna Düsseldorf	1–0	1. FC Nürnberg	Düsseldorf
	Mill 56'	Report (in German)		Stadium: Rheinstadion; Attendance: 10,000; Referee: Hans-Jürgen Kasper (Katlenburg)

7 November 1995	FC Homburg	3–4	1. FC Kaiserslautern	Homburg
	Goumai 35'; Arveladze 54'; Collins 74'	Report (in German)	Kuka 14', 18'; Flock 68'; Siegl 117'	Stadium: Waldstadion; Attendance: 20,000; Referee: Edgar Steinborn (Sinzig)

7 November 1995	Borussia Dortmund	1–3	Karlsruher SC	Dortmund
	Sammer 65'	Report (in German)	Dundee 27'; Nowotny 59'; Häßler 74' (pen.)	Stadium: Westfalenstadion; Attendance: 33,500; Referee: Markus Merk (Otterbach)

=== Semi-finals ===
27 February 1996	1. FC Kaiserslautern	1–0	Bayer Leverkusen	Kaiserslautern
	Kadlec 34'	Report (in German)		Stadium: Betzenbergstadion; Attendance: 31,000; Referee: Hartmut Strampe (Handorf)

28 February 1996	Karlsruher SC	2–0	Fortuna Düsseldorf	Karlsruhe
	Kiriakov 15'; Häßler 79'	Report (in German)		Stadium: Wildparkstadion; Attendance: 28,000; Referee: Bernd Heynemann (Karlsruhe)

=== Final ===
25 May 1996
19:00 CEST

Karlsruher SC	0–1	1. FC Kaiserslautern
	Report	Wagner 42'

Olympiastadion, Berlin
Attendance: 75,800
Referee: Hellmut Krug (Gelsenkirchen)
