= 1999–2000 SpVgg Unterhaching season =

SpVgg Unterhaching
1999–2000 season
- Manager: Lorenz-Günther Köstner
- Stadium: Sportpark Unterhaching
- Bundesliga: 10th
- DFB-Pokal: Second round

The 1999–2000 season was the first time SpVgg Unterhaching played in the 1. Bundesliga, the highest tier of the German football league system.

== Season summary ==
SpVgg Unterhaching surprised everyone with a respectable 10th-place result in their inaugural Bundesliga season, and also famously played the spoiler's role in deciding who would win the championship that year. Their first Bundesliga win came in just their second match of the season, with a 2-0 victory over MSV Duisburg at home. While struggling in away matches, Unterhaching remained undefeated at home in nine games before losing 2-0 to their stronger neighbours, Bayern Munich. Prior to this loss, they had earned wins at home in matches against highly favoured teams like VfB Stuttgart and Borussia Dortmund, beating them 2-0 and 1-0 respectively. They earned their first away win in the Bundesliga by beating VfB Stuttgart 2-0 once again.

On the final matchday of the season, visiting Bayer Leverkusen needed only a draw in Unterhaching to secure their first national title, but instead went down to defeat to the determined home side. Things took a bad turn for Leverkusen when Michael Ballack scored an own goal that put home side ahead in the 20th minute. Their title hopes ended when Haching midfielder Markus Oberleitner made the score 2-0 in the 72nd minute. Meanwhile, Bayern Munich beat Werder Bremen 3-1 at home and were able to overtake Leverkusen on goal difference to snatch away the title.

With a 10th-place result, Unterhaching finished ahead of long-established sides Borussia Dortmund and Schalke 04. They ended the season with the league's fifth best home record with 10 wins and 5 draws in 17 matches, having lost only to Bayern Munich and 1. FC Kaiserslautern.

== First team squad ==
No.	Pos.	Nation	Player
1	GK	GER	Jürgen Wittmann
2	DF	GER	Alexander Strehmel
3	MF	GER	Oliver Straube
4	DF	GER	Ralf Bucher
5	MF	GER	Matthias Zimmermann
6	DF	GER	Jörg Bergen
7	MF	GER	Dirk Hofman
8	MF	GER	Peter Zeiler
9	FW	ALB	Altin Rraklli
10	MF	GER	Markus Oberleitner
11	DF	GER	Jochen Seitz
12	MF	GER	Danny Schwarz
13	FW	GER	Mark Zimmermann
14	FW	ESP	Alfonso Garcia
15	DF	GER	Arne Tammen

No.	Pos.	Nation	Player
16	MF	GER	Andreas Hartig
17	DF	GER	Jan Seifert
18	MF	GER	Ludwig Kögl
19	MF	GER	Marco Haber
20	DF	GER	Dennis Grassow
21	MF	GER	Björn Hertl
22	GK	GER	Udo Mai
23	DF	GER	Ulrich Pflug
24	DF	CRO	Ivica Vladimir
25	DF	GER	Stefan Frühbeis
26	MF	GER	André Breitenreiter
27	GK	GER	Peter Sirch
28	GK	GER	Gerhard Tremmel
32	MF	GER	Alberto Méndez (on loan from Arsenal)
38	DF	GER	Tobias Iseli
