= 2020–21 FC Bayern Munich II season =

Bayern Munich II
2020–21 season
- President: Herbert Hainer
- Manager: Holger Seitz (until 4 April 2021); Danny Schwarz and Martín Demichelis (after 4 April 2021)
- Stadium: Grünwalder Stadion
- 3. Liga: 18th (Relegated)
- Top goalscorer: Timo Kern (8)
- Highest home attendance: 0
- Lowest home attendance: 0
- Average home league attendance: 0

FC Bayern Munich II played the 2020–21 season in the 3. Liga. Bayern Munich II went into the 2020–21 season as the defending 3. Liga champions, but were not promoted to 2. Bundesliga because they are a reserve team. Bayern II finished the 2020–21 season 17th in the league standings and were relegated to Regionalliga.

== Season ==
On 25 August, Holger Seitz was hired as the manager of Bayern II. The team's season started on 19 September with a 2–2 draw against Türkgücü München. A week later, Bayern II suffered a 3–0 loss to SC Verl, finishing 18th in the league standings after their September matches.

Bayern II started the month of October with a 3–0 win against Dynamo Dresden on 2 October, vaulting them 10 places in the standings to eighth place. Bayern II then drew their next two matches against KFC Uerdingen 05 and 1. FC Kaiserslautern, taking the team down three spots to 13th place. Bayern II suffered their only loss in October against Viktoria Köln 21 October. With a 2–0 win against Waldhof Mannheim on 25 October, Bayern II finished 11th in the league standings after the month of October.

On 1 November, Bayern II started the month with a 4–2 win against Wehen Wiesbaden. However, they went on to lose their next four matches to 1. FC Magdeburg, VfB Lübeck, FC Ingolstadt 04, and Hansa Rostock respectively, finishing 17th in the league standings in one of the four automatic relegation positions. After a bye week, Bayern II started December with a defeat of 1. FC Saarbrücken on 13 December, and the followed that win by earning two more points with draws against MSV Duisburg on 16 December and SpVgg Unterhaching on 19 December. Bayern II's December performance allowed them to move about the relegation line, but still left them 16th in league standings at the end of 2020.

After the winter break, Bayern started 2021 with a 2–0 loss to 1860 Munich on 9 January. Three days later, Bayern's first win in 2021 came against SV Meppen on 12 January 2021. Bayern II added another win and finished January 12th in league standings after a 0–0 draw against Türkgücü München on 22 January. In February, Bayern II won only one out of five matches, with that victory coming against FSV Zwickau on 10 February. Managing one draw and suffering two more losses, Bayern II finished February 11th in league standings following a 1–1 draw against Dynamo Dresden on 24 February.

Bayern II started March with a 2–2 draw against Waldhof Mannheim on 1 March, extending their winless streak to four games before defeating Wehen Wiesbaden on 7 March for their last win of the season. After this win, Bayern II went on their second four–game losing streak of the season, finishing March with losses to SC Verl, 1. FC Magdeburg, and SV Meppen. With those three losses, Bayern II had dropped to 15th in league standings.

On 2 April, Bayern announced that both Martín Demichelis and Danny Schwarz would replace Seitz after the 4 April match as managers for the remainder of the season. Bayern also announced that Seitz's last match was against VfB Lübeck, where they lost 3–2. After the change in managers, Bayern II continued to perform poorly, earning 0 wins, 4 draws, and 5 losses. Bayern II's season ended with a 1–0 loss to Hallescher FC. With this loss Bayern II finished the season on 37 points and in 17th place. As a result they were relegated to the Regionalliga for the 2021–22 season.

== Match results ==
Date	Opponent	Venue	Results F–A	Goalscorers	Attendance	Pos.	Ref.
19 September 2020 — 14:00	Türkgücü München	Home	2–2	Sararer, Fein	0	Tied for 7th	
26 September 2020 — 14:00	SC Verl	Away	0–3	—	1,000	18	
2 October 2020 — 19:00	Dynamo Dresden	Home	3–0	Arp, Dajaku, Kühn	0	8	
10 October 2020 — 14:00	KFC Uerdingen 05	Away	1–1	Dajaku	0	12	
17 October 2020 — 14:00	1. FC Kaiserslautern	Home	0–0	—	0	13	
21 October 2020 — 19:00	Viktoria Köln	Away	2–3	Kühn, Arp	0	13	
25 October 2020 — 14:00	Waldhof Mannheim	Home	2–0	Kühn, Vita	0	11	
1 November 2020 — 13:00	Wehen Wiesbaden	Away	4–2	Kern (2), Dajaku, Vita	100	10	
7 November 2020 — 14:00	1. FC Magdeburg	Away	1–2	Kern	0	9	
22 November 2020 — 13:00	VfB Lübeck	Away	0–3	—	0	13	
25 November 2020 — 19:00	FC Ingolstadt 04	Home	1–3	Kern	0	16	
28 November 2020 — 14:00	Hansa Rostock	Away	0–2	—	0	17	
13 December 2020 — 13:00	1. FC Saarbrücken	Away	2–1	Kern, Jastremski	0	16	
16 December 2020 — 19:00	MSV Duisburg	Home	1–1	Kern	0	15	
19 December 2020 — 14:00	SpVgg Unterhaching	Away	1–1	Arp	0	16	
9 January 2021 — 14:00	1860 Munich	Home	0–2	—	0	18	
12 January 2021 — 19:00	SV Meppen	Home	2–0	Kühn, Scott	0	14	
16 January 2021 — 14:00	Hallescher FC	Away	4–0	Jastremski (2), Zaiser (2)	0	12	
22 January 2021 — 19:00	Türkgücü München	Away	0–0	—	0	11	
7 February 2021 — 13:00	KFC Uerdingen 05	Home	0–1	—	0	15	
10 February 2021 — 19:00	FSV Zwickau	Home	3–2	Jastremski, Frick (own goal), Nkansah (own goal)	0	12	
13 February 2021 — 14:00	1. FC Kaiserslautern	Away	1–1	Oberlin	0	12	
21 February 2021 — 13:00	Viktoria Köln	Home	0–1	—	0	14	
24 February 2021 — 19:00	Dynamo Dresden	Away	1–1	Welzmüller	0	11	
1 March 2021 — 19:00	Waldhof Mannheim	Away	2–2	Feldhahn, Scott	0	11	
7 March 2021 — 14:00	Wehen Wiesbaden	Home	2–0	Boss (own goal), Zaiser	0	12	
10 March 2021 — 19:00	SC Verl	Home	1–2	Kern	0	12	
13 March 2021 — 14:00	1. FC Magdeburg	Home	0–2	—	0	13	
21 March 2021 — 13:00	SV Meppen	Away	1–2	Arp	0	15	
3 April 2021 — 14:00	VfB Lübeck	Home	2–3	Stiller, Rhein	0	16	
10 April 2021 — 14:00	FC Ingolstadt 04	Away	2–2	Singh, Lawrence	0	16	
16 April 2021 — 19:00	Hansa Rostock	Home	0–1	–	0	16	
20 April 2021 — 19:00	FSV Zwickau	Away	1–1	Singh	0	16	
26 April 2021 – 19:00	1. FC Saarbrücken	Home	0–4	–	0	18	
5 May 2021 — 19:00	MSV Duisburg	Away	2–2	Sieb, Arp	0	18	
9 May 2021 — 14:00	SpVgg Unterhaching	Home	1–2	Motika	0	18	
16 May 2021 — 14:00	1860 Munich	Away	2–2	Sieb, Singh	0	18	
22 May 2021 — 13:30	Hallescher FC	Home	0–1	–	250	17	
