= Ronald Lombaya =

German footballer (born 2001)

Personal information
- Date of birth: 8 January 2001 (age 25)
- Place of birth: Augsburg, Germany
- Height: 1.82 m (6 ft 0 in)
- Positions: Attacking midfielder; central midfielder

Youth career
- 2011–2016: FC Augsburg
- 2016–2019: FC Bayern Munich

Senior career*
Years	Team	Apps	(Gls)
2019–2020	SV Straelen (Note: During these spells, there were lockdowns, repeated season interruptions, prematurely ended competitions, as well as economic effects on match operations as a consequence of the COVID-19 pandemic. At SV Straelen, the 2019/20 season was interrupted in March 2020 and later ended prematurely. At 1. FC Mönchengladbach, the 2020/21 season was interrupted after eight matchdays and not resumed. At NK Rudar Velenje, Lombaya's first stint abroad ended prematurely in the winter of 2021/22 as a result of pandemic-related economic effects.)	2	(0)
2020–2021	1. FC Mönchengladbach	8	(1)
2021–2022	NK Rudar Velenje	8	(0)
2022	Viktoria Arnoldsweiler	9	(1)
2023	Kickers Emden	9	(1)
2024	Villena CF	11	(1)
2024–2026	Europa Point	21	(4)
- * Club domestic league appearances and goals as of 4 July 2026

Ronald Lombaya (born 8 January 2001) is a German professional footballer who was under contract with the Gibraltarian first-division club Europa Point until May 2026. As a midfielder, he is primarily deployed in attacking and central midfield but can also operate as a playmaking No. 6, particularly in possession-based systems. He was developed in the youth academies of FC Augsburg (U10–U15) and FC Bayern Munich (U16–U19).

After his move to FC Bayern in 2017, Lombaya established himself as a regular in the U16 team. However, an injury-related setback towards the end of his first season, followed by a difficult spell in the U17 and U19, hampered his further development, leading him to make the transition to senior football in 2019 at the age of 18.

In addition to the injury- and sport-related setbacks in the youth sector, the effects of the COVID-19 pandemic (2020–2023) also affected Lombaya's early years in senior football. Lockdowns, season interruptions, prematurely ended competitions, and their economic consequences shaped this period and made it more difficult to establish continuity during the transition to senior football. These circumstances also affected his first spell in professional football with the Slovenian Second League club NK Rudar Velenje at the beginning of his career.

After the pandemic had subsided, Lombaya completed a full season for the first time in several years in the 2022/23 season. After the first half of the season at Viktoria Arnoldsweiler, he moved during the winter break to the higher-tier Regionalliga club Kickers Emden. Across both clubs, he made 19 competitive appearances. In 2024 he moved to Villena CF, which competed in the upper tiers of Spanish amateur football. From there, he joined the Gibraltarian first-division club Europa Point FC for the second half of the season, establishing himself as an attacking midfielder during the 2025/26 season.

== Youth career ==
Lombaya began his football career at FC Augsburg, for whom he played from the U10 to the U15. In his last season, he scored four goals in 24 appearances for the U15, which drew the attention of FC Bayern Munich to the attacking midfielder and led them to sign him for their youth academy in 2016. In his first season, he initially belonged to the U16 of FC Bayern, which, as the second B-youth team, competed in the U17 Bayernliga and was coached by Danny Schwarz. In the 2016/17 season, Lombaya made 20 competitive appearances there and scored two goals.

Towards the end of the 2016/17 season, Lombaya suffered a torn medial collateral ligament, which extended into the preparations for the following season. As a result, he missed the summer preparation for his first season in the Under 17 Bundesliga. For the 2017/18 season, he was promoted as planned to the U17-Bundesliga team of FC Bayern, initially coached by Tim Walter and later by Holger Seitz.

After his recovery, Lombaya faced a highly competitive U17 age group at FC Bayern, alongside Angelo Stiller, Malik Tillman, Ryan Johansson, and Jahn Herrmann. Due to the long injury layoff, Lombaya was only included in the matchday squad again from matchday 7 onward. Under Seitz, after his recovery, he made only two brief appearances in the Under 17 Bundesliga South/Southwest. The team reached the final of the German U17 championship and became German vice-champions after a 2–3 defeat against Borussia Dortmund.

For the 2018/19 season, Lombaya was promoted to the U19 of FC Bayern Munich. Under coach Sebastian Hoeneß, he did not make a competitive appearance either in the Under 19 Bundesliga South/Southwest or in the DFB Youth Cup. Despite being eligible to play another season in the U19 sector, Lombaya decided after the end of the season to make the move to senior football and joined SV Straelen in the summer of 2019.

== Club career ==
SV Straelen and COVID-19 cancellation (2019/20)

After two difficult years in the youth academy of FC Bayern Munich, Lombaya moved to SV Straelen in the summer of 2019 at the age of 18, making the transition to senior football. The club had previously been relegated from the Regionalliga West to the Oberliga Niederrhein and aimed for immediate promotion. Under coach Inka Grings, Lombaya made his competitive senior debut on 4 August 2019 in the first round of the Niederrheinpokal, coming on as a late substitute in a 2–1 defeat against Rather SV. His league debut followed on matchday 1 of the 2019/20 Oberliga Niederrhein season in a 2–0 home win against Cronenberger SC. He made another brief appearance on matchday 4 in a 6–1 away defeat against SC Velbert. Over the remainder of the season, Lombaya was included in the matchday squad several more times but remained largely without further appearances.

From February 2020 onward, Lombaya was sidelined due to knee problems. Shortly thereafter, play was initially interrupted as a result of the COVID-19 pandemic and the season was prematurely ended in March. As a result, his first season in senior football ended around three months earlier than planned due to injury and the pandemic. At the time of the cancellation, SV Straelen was in first place in the table and was later declared champions, whereby the club returned to the Regionalliga West. Lombaya thus belonged to the promotion squad but made only two brief appearances in the Oberliga season.

1. FC Mönchengladbach and renewed COVID-19 cancellation (2020/21)

After around six months without team training as a result of the COVID-19 pandemic, Lombaya moved to the Oberliga club 1. FC Mönchengladbach at the age of 19 at the end of July 2020. There, he immediately made the jump into the starting lineup. He made his league debut on matchday 3 in a 0–2 home defeat against Sportfreunde Niederwenigern. Up to matchday 10, he was in the starting eleven in all eight league matches under three different coaches and was mainly deployed in attacking and defensive midfield. On 24 September 2020, he provided his first assist in senior football in a 2–1 away win against FSV Duisburg on matchday 4. Three days later, he scored his first goal in senior football in a 2–1 home win against SC Velbert on matchday 5. Overall, he made eight Oberliga appearances, scoring one goal and providing one assist.

After matchday 10, play in the 2020/21 Oberliga Niederrhein was once again interrupted at the end of October 2020 as a result of the COVID-19 pandemic. The season was not resumed and was cancelled and annulled without evaluation on 19 April 2021 by the Lower Rhine Football Association. After Lombaya had established himself as a regular player in senior football for the first time at 1. FC Mönchengladbach, play was once again interrupted as a result of the COVID-19 pandemic and the season was ultimately ended without evaluation.

NK Rudar Velenje and premature contract termination due to COVID (2021/22)

For the 2021/22 season, Lombaya moved to the Slovenian Second League club NK Rudar Velenje. At the age of 20, he completed his first stint abroad and his first engagement in international professional football. He made his debut on matchday 2 in a 1–0 away win against NK Rogaška, as a second-half substitute. On matchday 7, he provided his first assist in professional football in a 4–1 home win against NK Drava Ptuj. In the further course of the first half of the season, he was predominantly used as a substitute and regularly belonged to the matchday squad. Overall, Lombaya was in the squad 12 times in the first half of the season, made eight league appearances, and provided one assist.

In the winter of 2021/22, Lombaya's contract was terminated prematurely. The background was the economic effects of the COVID-19 pandemic, as a result of which numerous clubs reduced their squads or realigned their personnel. Rudar Velenje also parted ways with several foreign players in this context, whereby Lombaya's first station in international professional football ended prematurely.

First season without pandemic-related interruptions: Viktoria Arnoldsweiler and Kickers Emden (2022/23)

After the COVID-19 pandemic (2020–2023) had gradually subsided and regular play had resumed, Lombaya began the first full season without pandemic-related interruptions since his move to senior football in 2019 with the move to the Oberliga club Viktoria Arnoldsweiler. He made nine league appearances in the first half of the season, five of them in the starting eleven. He scored his first goal for the club in a 5–1 away win against FC Hennef 05 on matchday 5. On matchday 15, he provided an assist in a 3–2 home win against TuS Königsdorf. In addition, he made one appearance in the Middle Rhine Cup.

During the winter break of the 2022/23 season, he was signed by the Regionalliga club Kickers Emden, after Lombaya had been training with the club since the beginning of the year. The East Frisians strengthened themselves for the fight against relegation with the 21-year-old. Lombaya made his Regionalliga debut on matchday 21 under Stefan Emmerling in a 2–0 home win against SSV Jeddeloh II, when he was substituted on in the closing stages. By the end of the season, he made nine appearances in the Regionalliga Nord and was mainly deployed in both attacking and defensive midfield positions. Despite the reinforcements, Kickers Emden were relegated from the Regionalliga Nord at the end of the season.

Overall, Lombaya made 19 competitive appearances in the 2022/23 season, scored one goal and assisted another.

=== New beginning abroad: Spain and Gibraltar (2024–2026) ===
After he had remained without a club after the end of the 2022/23 season, Lombaya took part in a scouting project in Spain from January 2024 onward. He made competitive appearances there from the 2024/25 season for Villena CF, a club which offered selected players from various countries the opportunity to present themselves to scouts in test matches and league play. For Villena CF, who played in higher Spanish amateur football, he made his debut on matchday 1 of the 2024/25 season against CD Murada. Up to the winter break, he made 11 league appearances, was in the starting XI seven times, and scored his first goal for the club on matchday 2 in a 5–1 home win against Intercity B.

Through his performances, the Gibraltar Football League club Europa Point signed Lombaya for the second half of the season. In the second half of the season, he made five league appearances as well as one appearance in the cup and scored his first goal for Europa Point on matchday 20 in a 3–3 draw against Mons Calpe.

For the 2025/26 season, the Argentine Claudio Racino took over the coaching position. Under him, Lombaya developed into a regular player and assumed a central role in attacking play as a classic number ten and playmaker. He scored his first goal of the season on matchday 4 in a 2–2 draw against Lynx FC. On matchday 7, he scored the winning goal in a 1–0 home win against FC College 1975. One of his strongest performances of the season came on matchday 8 in a 4–3 away win against Manchester 62, when he scored one goal and assisted two more. In the 3–4 match against FC College 1975 on matchday 18, he was also involved in both of his team's goals with one goal and one assist.

In the 2025/26 season, Lombaya made 18 of the 22 league appearances, was in the starting XI 17 times, scored three goals, and assisted eight goals. It marked his most successful season of his senior career to date. Europa Point finished the season in eighth place in the table. In one and a half years, Lombaya made a total of 22 competitive appearances for Europa Point, scored four goals, and assisted eight further goals, marking his first longer phase as a regular player in senior football.

== Honours ==
FC Bayern Munich U17

- Under 17 Bundesliga runner-up: 2018

SV Straelen

- Oberliga Niederrhein champions: 2020
- Promotion to the Regionalliga West: 2020
