= Oberleitner =

Oberleitner is a German language habitational surname. Notable people with the name include:

- Franz Xaver Oberleitner (1789–1832), Austrian theologian and orientalist
- Karin Oberleitner (born 1968), Austrian former professional tennis player
- Markus Oberleitner (born 1973), German footballer
- Michael Oberleitner (born 1966), Austrian tennis coach and former professional player
- Neil Oberleitner (born 1999), Austrian tennis player
