= Martín Demichelis =

Argentine footballer and manager (born 1980)

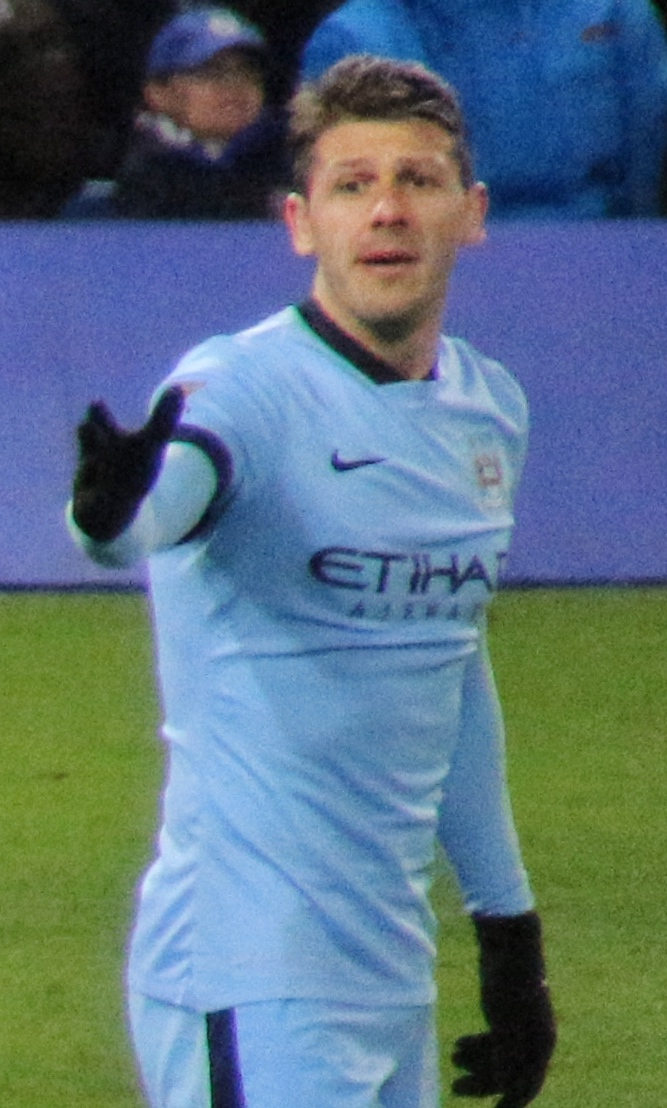
- Demichelis with Manchester City in 2015

Personal information
- Full name: Martín Gastón Demichelis
- Date of birth: 20 December 1980 (age 45)
- Place of birth: Justiniano Posse, Argentina
- Height: 1.84 m (6 ft 0 in)
- Positions: Centre-back; defensive midfielder

Team information
- Current team: RB Leipzig (head coach)

Youth career
- 1994–1995: Complejo Deportivo
- 1995–1998: Club Renato Cesarini
- 1998–2000: River Plate

Senior career*
Years	Team	Apps	(Gls)
2000–2003	River Plate	52	(1)
2003–2010	Bayern Munich	174	(13)
2004	Bayern Munich II	1	(0)
2011–2013	Málaga	84	(7)
2013	Atlético Madrid	0	(0)
2013–2016	Manchester City	78	(3)
2016–2017	Espanyol	2	(0)
2017	Málaga	10	(0)
Total		401	(24)

International career
2005–2016	Argentina	51	(2)

Managerial career
- 2021–2022: Bayern Munich II
- 2022–2024: River Plate
- 2024–2025: Monterrey
- 2026: Mallorca
- 2026–: RB Leipzig
Medal record
Argentina
FIFA World Cup
Runner-up	2014 Brazil
Copa América
Runner-up	2015 Chile
FIFA Confederations Cup
Runner-up	2005 Germany
- * Club domestic league appearances and goals

Martín Gastón Demichelis (Spanish pronunciation: [maɾˈtin demiˈtʃelis]; born 20 December 1980) is an Argentine football manager and former player who is the head coach of Bundesliga club RB Leipzig.

A centre-back who could also operate as a defensive midfielder, Demichelis started his career in Argentina with River Plate. He spent most of his professional career with Bayern Munich in Germany (seven and a half years), winning 11 major titles with the team, including the Bundesliga four times. He also played in Spain with Espanyol, Atletico Madrid, and Málaga and in England with Manchester City, where he won the Premier League once and the League Cup twice. He made his debut for the Argentina national team in 2005, earning 51 caps. He represented the country at the 2010 and 2014 World Cups, finishing runners-up at the latter. He also represented them at the 2005 Confederations Cup and the 2015 Copa América, with Argentina finishing runners-up at both tournaments.

Demichelis began his coaching career as an assistant at Málaga before coaching the under-19 and reserve teams of Bayern Munich. In 2022, he became manager of River Plate, winning the 2023 Argentine Primera División in his first season. He then had spells with Monterrey in Mexico, and Mallorca in Spain, before becoming head coach of RB Leipzig in 2026.

== Club career ==
=== River Plate ===
Born in Justiniano Posse, Córdoba, Demichelis started playing professionally in 2001, with Buenos Aires-based River Plate, having arrived at the club's youth system three years earlier.

He made his first-team – and first division – debut on 2 September 2001 in a game against Estudiantes, scoring his only goal for the team against Rosario Central.

On 28 April 2002, River Plate goalkeeper Ángel Comizzo was sent off with a minute of regulation time remaining against Racing Club, leaving Demichelis to take over in goal. He faced a direct free kick that hit the wall and was countered for the only goal of the game by Nelson Cuevas, as River won the Clausura title.

=== Bayern Munich ===
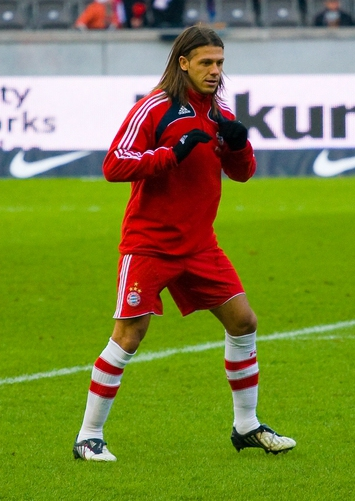
Demichelis with Bayern in 2009

Demichelis signed for Bayern Munich in the 2003 summer, for €4.5 million. His first season in the Bundesliga was not very positive as he suffered a number of minor injuries, appearing in only 14 league games (21 in total) as the Bavarians finished in second position; in early 2004 he appeared in his only game with the reserves, against Stuttgarter Kickers.

Under new coach Felix Magath, Demichelis became a regular starter for Bayern, appearing in 75 official matches in two seasons combined as the team won back-to-back doubles, achieving a total of four during his spell.

Returning Bayern boss Ottmar Hitzfeld successfully reconverted Demichelis from a defensive midfielder into a central defender. In 2008–09 he netted a career-best four goals in 29 games, but the title was lost to VfL Wolfsburg. However, the player often clashed with the new manager Louis van Gaal, starting immediately after the first matchday after being dropped from the starting XI for the 2010–11 opener against Wolfsburg, with Demichelis requesting that van Gaal omit him from the squad altogether, which the coach did; the player thereafter voiced to the press that it would be probable that he and the club went separate ways.

On 29 October 2010, benefitting from a run of injuries in the squad, Demichelis made one of his last appearances for Bayern, heading a goal in a 4–2 home win against SC Freiburg.

=== Málaga and Atlético Madrid ===
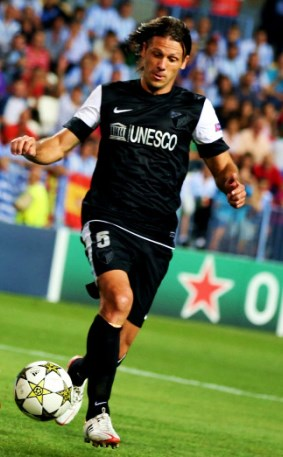
Demichelis playing for Málaga in 2012

In late December 2010, Demichelis agreed to a deal with Spanish club Málaga, initially until the end of the 2010–11 season, with the latter retaining the option to extend the contract for a further two seasons. He rejoined former River Plate manager Manuel Pellegrini, and made his La Liga debut on 8 January 2011, scoring in a 1–1 home draw against Athletic Bilbao.

During his first four months with Málaga, Demichelis was sent off twice, but also started in all the matches he was available, being essential – as another January 2011 signee, Júlio Baptista – as the club eventually avoided relegation. On 22 August 2012, he scored the club's first-ever UEFA Champions League goal, netting the opener in the 2–0 playoff home win against Panathinaikos (also the aggregate score).

On 11 July 2013, Demichelis signed for Atlético Madrid on a one-year contract, after his deal with Málaga expired. In December, he started legal action against the latter over "non-payments", relating to "€400,000 of unpaid wages as well as bonuses".

=== Manchester City ===
On 1 September 2013, Demichelis joined former Málaga boss Pellegrini and signed with Manchester City, penning a two-year contract for a reported £4.2 million. He had been with Atlético for less than two months, and had yet to make an appearance.

Demichelis made his first appearance for his new club on 27 October 2013, starting in a 1–2 Premier League loss at Chelsea after recovering from a knee injury. On 18 February of the following year, he was sent off against Barcelona in the club's Champions League round-of-16 0–2 home defeat, after fouling Lionel Messi and giving away a penalty.

Despite Demichelis's rocky start at City, Pellegrini kept faith in him. On 15 March 2014, after club captain Vincent Kompany was sent off, he was instrumental in a 2–0 victory over Hull City. The following weekend he scored his first goal, contributing to a 5–0 home win over Fulham; his good run of form in the last two months of the season helped his team win the league title, and also helped him rejoin the national side.

On 12 March 2015, Demichelis renewed his expiring contract until June of the following year. A year later, he was charged by The Football Association for 12 breaches of their rules against gambling on matches, and accepted the charge; he was fined £22,058 for the breach.

On 10 June 2016, Demichelis was released.

=== Return to Spain ===
On 10 August 2016, at nearly 36, Demichelis signed a one-year contract Espanyol in Spain's top flight. On 10 January 2017, however, after only two appearances, he was released.

A week after his exit from Espanyol, Demichelis returned to Málaga's La Rosaleda Stadium, on a five-month deal. On 15 May 2017, he announced his retirement.

== International career ==
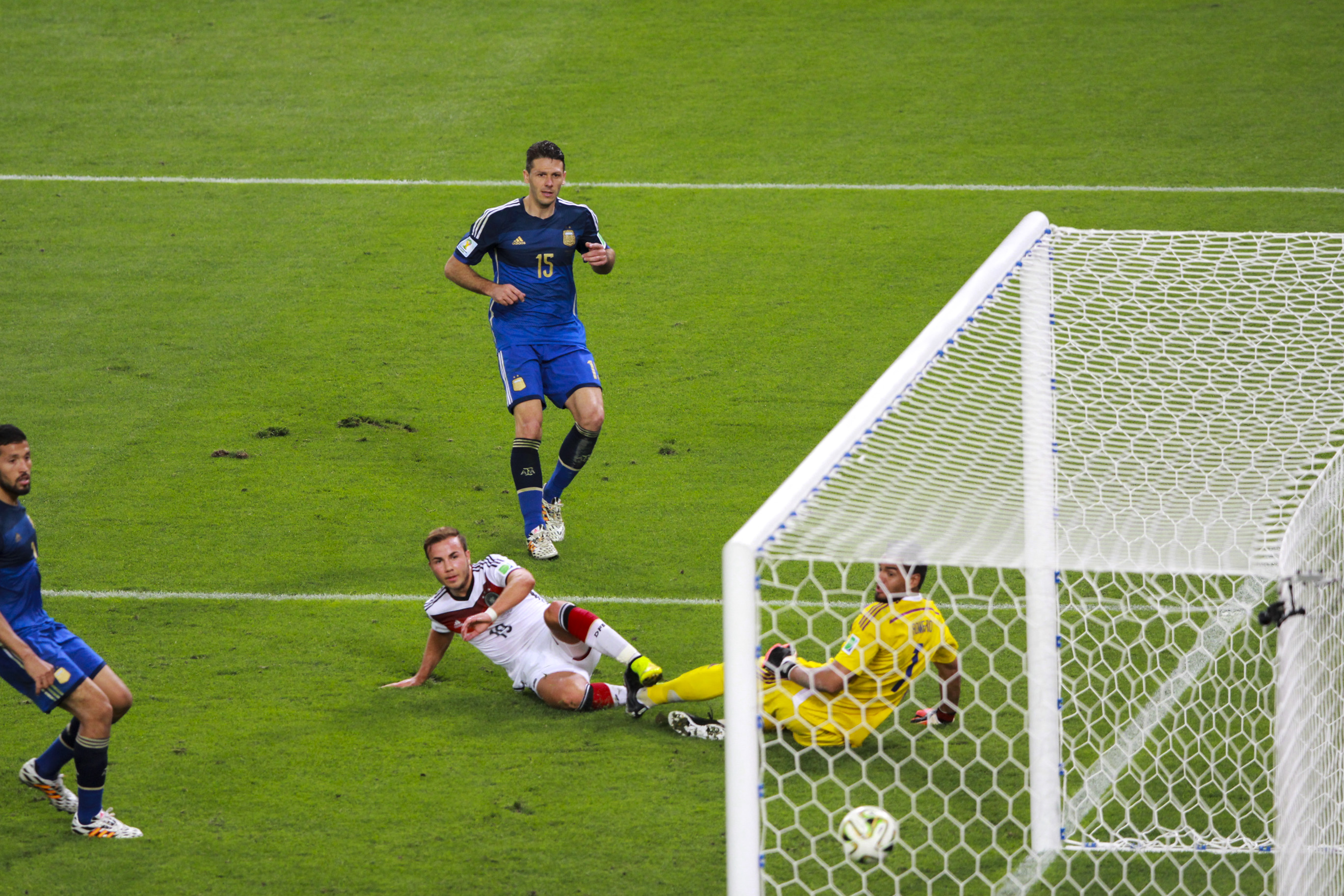
Mario Götze scoring the winning goal for Germany as Ezequiel Garay (left), Demichelis (centre) and goalkeeper Sergio Romero look on during the 2014 World Cup Final

Demichelis was first called up for Argentina to compete at the 2005 FIFA Confederations Cup in Germany, where he was unused by the eventual runners-up. He made his debut under José Pekerman on 12 November 2005 that year, in a 3–2 friendly loss to England at the Stade de Genève in Switzerland, playing as a defensive midfielder; he was not chosen for the 2006 FIFA World Cup.

On 11 September 2007, Demichelis scored his first international goal, heading the only goal of a friendly against Australia at the Melbourne Cricket Ground. He suffered a facial injury during an exhibition game with Germany on 3 March 2010, being sidelined for three weeks, and later being selected for the year's World Cup in South Africa. Under Diego Maradona, he played in all of Argentina's games at the tournament, partnering Nicolás Burdisso in central defence in an eventual quarter-final exit; on 22 June, he scored the first goal in the 2–0 group stage win against Greece.

Demichelis lost his place in the national side in November 2011, after a World Cup qualifier against Bolivia. A two-and-a-half-year absence followed, until he was included in Alejandro Sabella's provisional 30-man squad for the 2014 World Cup. He ended up making the final list. On the bench for the team's first four games, Demichelis made his debut in the tournament in the 1–0 quarter-final win over Belgium in which he played the full 90 minutes, taking the place of Federico Fernandez. He went on to start in the semi-finals where his team eliminated the Netherlands in a penalty shootout after a 0–0 draw, and again in the final against Germany and picked up the runners-up medal as Argentina lost 1–0 after extra time.

Demichelis was chosen for the 2015 Copa América in Chile, making his debut in the final group game, a 1–0 win over Jamaica, as a starter in place of Nicolás Otamendi. He then played the semi-final against Paraguay and the final defeat to the hosts, alongside Otamendi and in place of illness-stricken Ezequiel Garay.

== Coaching career ==
=== Early years ===
In May 2017, immediately after retiring, Demichelis remained at Málaga as assistant manager to Míchel, replacing Weligton who had returned to Brazil due to injury. He remained in employment after the head coach was dismissed in January, but was not as involved under his successor José González.

Demichelis returned to Bayern in June 2019, to manage the under-19 team. On 2 April 2021, it was announced that he and Danny Schwarz would replace Holger Seitz as Bayern Munich II manager, becoming the club's historical first non European head coach. His first match as coach of a senior team was on 17 July, a 3–0 win at FC Augsburg II on the first day of the Regionalliga Bayern season.

=== River Plate ===
In October 2022, Demichelis obtained a UEFA Pro coaching license after passing the yearly course organised by the Italian Football Federation. On 16 November, River Plate appointed Demichelis as their new head coach, on a 3-year contract.

On 28 January 2023, Demichelis made his debut with a 3–0 win against Central Córdoba. On 15 July, River Plate secured the league title with three games left to play, giving Demichelis his first title as manager. On 27 July 2024, Demichelis was dismissed from his position.

=== Monterrey ===
On 12 August 2024, Mexican club Monterrey appointed Demichelis as their new head coach. On 11 May 2025, Demichelis was relieved of his duties.

=== Mallorca ===
On 26 February 2026, La Liga side Mallorca announced the signing of Demichelis as manager, on a contract until the end of the season. Despite collecting 18 points over the final 12 match days, RCD Mallorca was relegated to the Segunda División at the conclusion of the 2025–26 La Liga season. On 28 May 2026, Demichelis renewed his contract with Mallorca, now in the Segunda División, until June 2028.

=== RB Leipzig ===
In June 2026, Demichelis signed with Bundesliga side RB Leipzig.

== Personal life ==
Demichelis also holds an Italian passport. He and his wife, model Evangelina Anderson, have a son and two daughters. On 19 February 2019, a group of burglars broke into his house in Spain, stealing cash and jewellery before he chased them out.

== Career statistics ==
=== Club ===
Appearances and goals by club, season and competition
Club	Season	League			National cup (Note: Includes DFB-Pokal, Copa del Rey, FA Cup)		League cup (Note: Includes DFL-Ligapokal, EFL Cup)		Continental		Other		Total	
Club	Season	Division	Apps	Goals	Apps	Goals	Apps	Goals	Apps	Goals	Apps	Goals	Apps	Goals
River Plate	2001–02	Argentine Primera División	17	0	—		—		7 (Note: Six appearances in Copa Libertadores, one appearance in Copa Mercosur)	1	—		24	1
River Plate	2002–03	Argentine Primera División	35	1	—		—		11 (Note: Nine appearances and one goal in Copa Libertadores, two appearances in Copa Sudamericana)	1	—		46	2
River Plate	Total		52	1	—		—		18	2	—		70	3
Bayern Munich II	2003–04	Regionalliga	1	0	—		—		—		—		1	0
Bayern Munich	2003–04	Bundesliga	14	2	2	0	0	0	5 (Note: Appearances in UEFA Champions League)	0	—		21	2
Bayern Munich	2004–05	Bundesliga	23	0	5	0	2	0	5	0	—		35	0
Bayern Munich	2005–06	Bundesliga	27	1	4	0	1	0	8	2	—		40	3
Bayern Munich	2006–07	Bundesliga	26	3	2	0	1	0	6	0	—		35	3
Bayern Munich	2007–08	Bundesliga	28	1	4	0	2	0	10 (Note: Appearances in UEFA Cup)	0	—		44	1
Bayern Munich	2008–09	Bundesliga	29	4	3	0	—		8	0	—		40	4
Bayern Munich	2009–10	Bundesliga	21	1	4	0	—		9	0	—		34	1
Bayern Munich	2010–11	Bundesliga	6	1	1	0	—		2	0	1 (Note: Appearance in DFL-Supercup)	0	10	1
Bayern Munich	Total		174	13	25	0	6	0	53	2	1	0	259	15
Málaga	2010–11	La Liga	18	1	1	0	—		—		—		19	1
Málaga	2011–12	La Liga	35	2	4	1	—		—		—		39	3
Málaga	2012–13	La Liga	31	4	3	0	—		11	1	—		45	5
Málaga	Total		84	7	8	1	—		11	1	—		103	9
Manchester City	2013–14	Premier League	27	2	2	0	2	0	4	0	—		35	2
Manchester City	2014–15	Premier League	31	1	0	0	2	0	7	0	—		40	1
Manchester City	2015–16	Premier League	20	0	2	0	5	0	4	1	—		31	1
Manchester City	Total		78	3	4	0	9	0	15	1	—		106	4
Espanyol	2016–17	La Liga	2	0	0	0	—		—		—		2	0
Málaga	2016–17	La Liga	10	0	0	0	—		—		—		10	0
Career total			401	24	37	1	15	0	97	6	1	0	551	31

=== International ===
Appearances and goals by national team and year
National team	Year	Apps	Goals
Argentina	2005	2	0
Argentina	2006	1	0
Argentina	2007	5	1
Argentina	2008	9	0
Argentina	2009	7	0
Argentina	2010	9	1
Argentina	2011	4	0
Argentina	2012	0	0
Argentina	2013	0	0
Argentina	2014	7	0
Argentina	2015	5	0
Argentina	2016	2	0
Total		51	2

Scores and results list Argentina's goal tally first, score column indicates score after each Demichelis goal.

List of international goals scored by Martín Demichelis
No.	Date	Venue	Opponent	Score	Result	Competition	Ref.
1	11 September 2007	MCG, Melbourne, Australia	Australia	1–0	1–0	Friendly	
2	22 June 2010	Peter Mokaba, Polokwane, South Africa	Greece	1–0	2–0	2010 FIFA World Cup	

== Coaching record ==
As of match played 21 November 2026

Team	From	To	Record								Ref.
Team	From	To	M	W	D	L	GF	GA	GD	Win %	Ref.
Bayern Munich II	4 April 2021	13 November 2022	65	34	16	15	160	97	+63	52.31	
River Plate	17 November 2022	29 July 2024	87	52	18	17	157	80	+77	59.77	
Monterrey	13 August 2024	11 May 2025	43	20	11	12	81	54	+27	46.51	
Mallorca	1 March 2026	22 June 2026	12	5	3	4	18	15	+3	41.67	
RB Leipzig	22 June 2026	Present	16	10	0	6	45	26	+19	62.50	
Total			223	121	48	54	461	272	+189	54.26	—

1.In the 2020–21 season, Martin Demichelis co-managed together with Danny Schwarz.

== Honours ==
=== Player ===
River Plate

- Argentine Primera División: Clausura 2002, Clausura 2003

Bayern Munich

- Bundesliga: 2004–05, 2005–06, 2007–08, 2009–10
- DFB-Pokal: 2004–05, 2005–06, 2007–08, 2009–10
- DFB-Ligapokal: 2004, 2007
- DFL-Supercup: 2010
- UEFA Champions League runner-up: 2009–10

Manchester City

- Premier League: 2013–14
- Football League Cup: 2013–14, 2015–16

Argentina

- FIFA World Cup runner-up: 2014
- FIFA Confederations Cup runner-up: 2005
- Copa América runner-up: 2015

Individual

- kicker Bundesliga Team of the Season: 2007–08

=== Manager ===
River Plate

- Argentine Primera División: 2023
- Trofeo de Campeones: 2023
- Supercopa Argentina: 2023

Individual

- La Liga Manager of the Month: April 2026
