= Dirk Flock =

German footballer and manager (born 1972)

Personal information
- Date of birth: 23 May 1972 (age 54)
- Place of birth: Cologne, West Germany
- Height: 1.84 m (6 ft 0 in)
- Position: Midfielder

Youth career
- 1. FC Köln

Senior career*
Years	Team	Apps	(Gls)
1992–1993	FC Remscheid	25	(1)
1993–1994	Stuttgarter Kickers	27	(1)
1994–1996	1. FC Kaiserslautern	26	(0)
1996–1998	FC Gütersloh	61	(10)
1998–2000	Werder Bremen	31	(1)
2000–2003	Arminia Bielefeld	23	(0)
2004–2007	FC Gütersloh 2000		
2007–2008	SC Wiedenbrück 2000	31	(3)
2008–2009	FC Gütersloh 2000	34	(4)

Managerial career
- 2009–2012: FC Gütersloh 2000
- * Club domestic league appearances and goals

Dirk Flock (born 23 May 1972) is a German former professional football player and now manager.

== Honours ==
1. FC Kaiserslautern

- DFB-Pokal: 1995–96

Werder Bremen

- DFB-Pokal: 1998–99; runner-up 1999–2000
- DFB-Ligapokal: runner-up 1999
