= Timo Kern =

German footballer

Personal information
- Full name: Timo Kern
- Date of birth: 16 January 1990 (age 36)
- Place of birth: Hockenheim, West Germany
- Height: 1.79 m (5 ft 10 in)
- Position: Attacking midfielder

Youth career
- FV 08 Hockenheim
- –2008: Karlsruher SC

Senior career*
Years	Team	Apps	(Gls)
2008–2012	Karlsruher SC II	60	(11)
2010–2013	Karlsruher SC	14	(1)
2013–2018	FC Astoria Walldorf	100	(25)
2018–2019	Waldhof Mannheim	28	(17)
2019–2024	Bayern Munich II	139	(50)
2022	Bayern Munich	0	(0)
- * Club domestic league appearances and goals as of 23:45, 30 November 2024 (UTC)

Timo Kern (born 16 January 1990) is a German former professional footballer who played as an attacking midfielder.

He began his career with Karlsruher SC and made his debut for the club in September 2010, as a substitute for Timo Staffeldt in a 2–0 defeat to FSV Frankfurt in the 2. Bundesliga, and finished it with Bayern Munich II in the end of 2024. Kern received his first and only call-up with Bayern Munich senior team as an unused substitute during a 2–1 home loss Bundesliga match against Borussia Mönchengladbach on 7 January 2022.

== Career statistics ==
As of match played 30 November 2024

Appearances and goals by club, season and competition
Club	Season	League			Cup		Total	
Club	Season	Division	Apps	Goals	Apps	Goals	Apps	Goals
Karlsruher SC II	2008–09	Regionalliga Süd	4	0	—		4	0
Karlsruher SC II	2009–10	Regionalliga Süd	26	5	—		26	5
Karlsruher SC II	2010–11	Regionalliga Süd	25	6	—		25	6
Karlsruher SC II	2011–12	Regionalliga Süd	5	0	—		5	0
Karlsruher SC II	Total		60	11	—		60	11
Karlsruher SC	2010–11	2. Bundesliga	1	0	0	0	1	0
Karlsruher SC	2011–12	2. Bundesliga	0	0	0	0	0	0
Karlsruher SC	2012–13	3. Liga	13	1	0	0	13	1
Karlsruher SC	Total		14	1	0	0	14	1
FC Astoria Walldorf	2014–15	Regionalliga Südwest	27	10	1	0	28	10
FC Astoria Walldorf	2015–16	Regionalliga Südwest	20	4	—		20	4
FC Astoria Walldorf	2016–17	Regionalliga Südwest	24	6	3	0	27	6
FC Astoria Walldorf	2017–18	Regionalliga Südwest	29	4	—		29	4
FC Astoria Walldorf	Total		100	24	4	0	104	24
Waldhof Mannheim	2018–19	Regionalliga Südwest	28	17	—		28	17
Waldhof Mannheim	Total		28	17	—		28	17
Bayern Munich II	2019–20	3. Liga	30	6	—		30	6
Bayern Munich II	2020–21	3. Liga	22	8	—		22	8
Bayern Munich II	2021–22	Regionalliga Bayern	23	5	—		23	5
Bayern Munich II	2022–23	Regionalliga Bayern	27	13	—		27	13
Bayern Munich II	2023–24	Regionalliga Bayern	23	12	—		23	12
Bayern Munich II	2024–25	Regionalliga Bayern	14	6	—		14	6
Bayern Munich II	Total		139	50	—		139	50
Bayern Munich	2021–22	Bundesliga	0	0	—		0	0
Bayern Munich	Total		0	0	—		0	0
Career Total			341	103	4	0	345	103
