= Kickers Offenbach =

German association football club

- Full name: Offenbacher Fußball-Club Kickers 1901 e. V.
- Nicknames: Rot-Weiß (The Red and White)
- Short name: OFC
- Founded: 27 May 1901; 125 years ago
- Stadium: Stadion am Bieberer Berg
- Capacity: 20,500
- President: Joachim Wagner
- Head coach: Mark Zimmermann
- League: Regionalliga Südwest (IV)
- 2025–26: Regionalliga Südwest, 14th of 18
- Website: ofc.de
Home colours	Away colours	Third colours

Offenbacher Fussball-Club Kickers, commonly known as Kickers Offenbach, is a German association football club in Offenbach am Main, Hesse. The club was founded on 27 May 1901 in the Rheinischer Hof restaurant by footballers who had left established local clubs including Melitia, Teutonia, Viktoria, Germania and Neptun. From 1921 to 1925 they were united with VfB 1900 Offenbach as VfR Kickers Offenbach until resuming their status as a separate side, Offenbacher FC Kickers. The team plays its home games at the Stadion am Bieberer Berg and has fierce rivalries with Eintracht Frankfurt and Waldhof Mannheim.

== History ==
The club became one of the founding members of the Nordkreis-Liga in 1909, where it played until the outbreak of the war. In post-First World War Germany, Kickers played in the Kreisliga Südmain (I), winning this league in 1920, 1922 and 1923.

The club played as a mid-table side in the Bezirksliga Main-Hessen through the late 1920s and early 1930s. German football was re-organized in 1933 under the Third Reich into sixteen first division Gauligen. Kickers joined the Gauliga Südwest, where the team immediately captured the title and entered the national playoffs for the first time. They fared poorly there, but did manage to raise their overall level of play in the following seasons, going on to win five consecutive divisional championships from 1940 to 1944.

In the early 1940s, the Gauliga Südwest had been split into the Gauliga Westmark and the Gauliga Hessen-Nassau, where Kickers played. Their best post-season result came in 1942 when the team was able to advance as far as the semi-finals in the national championship rounds before they were decisively put out 0:6 by Schalke 04, who were on their way to their sixth championship as the era's most dominant side. By 1944, Allied armies were rolling through Germany and the Gauliga Hessen-Nassau did not play the 1944–45 season. In their 1953 Asian Tour, they played twelve matches.

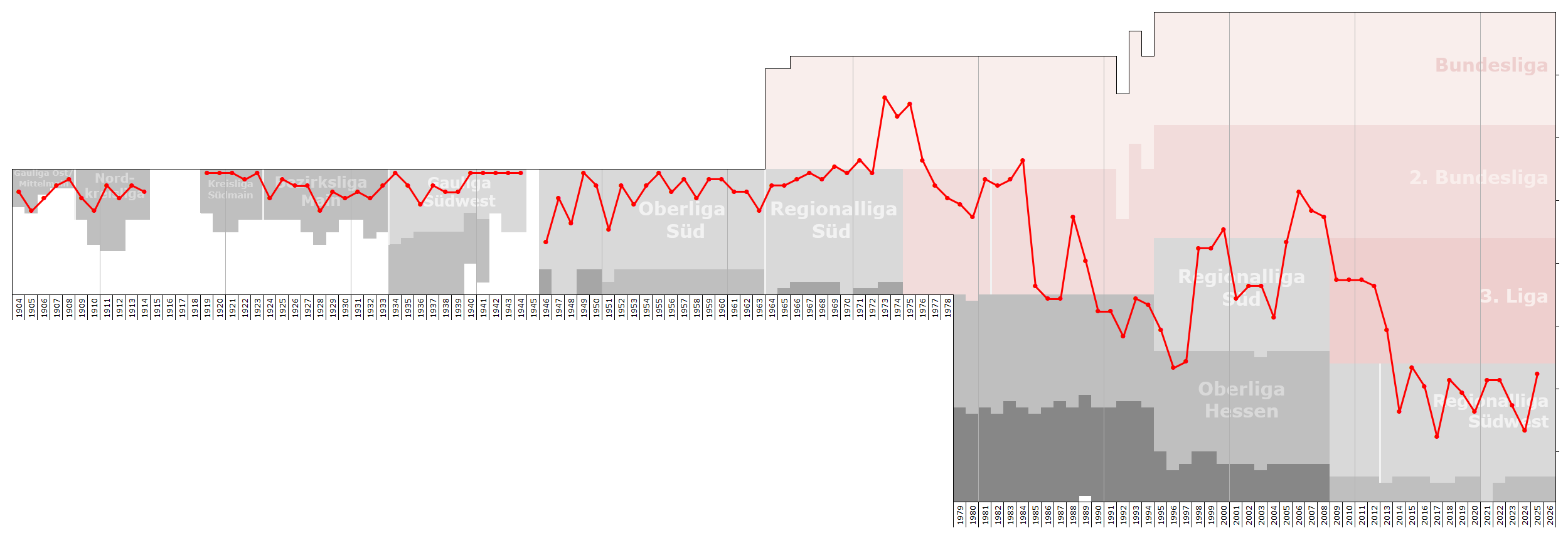
Historical chart of Kickers Offenbach league performance

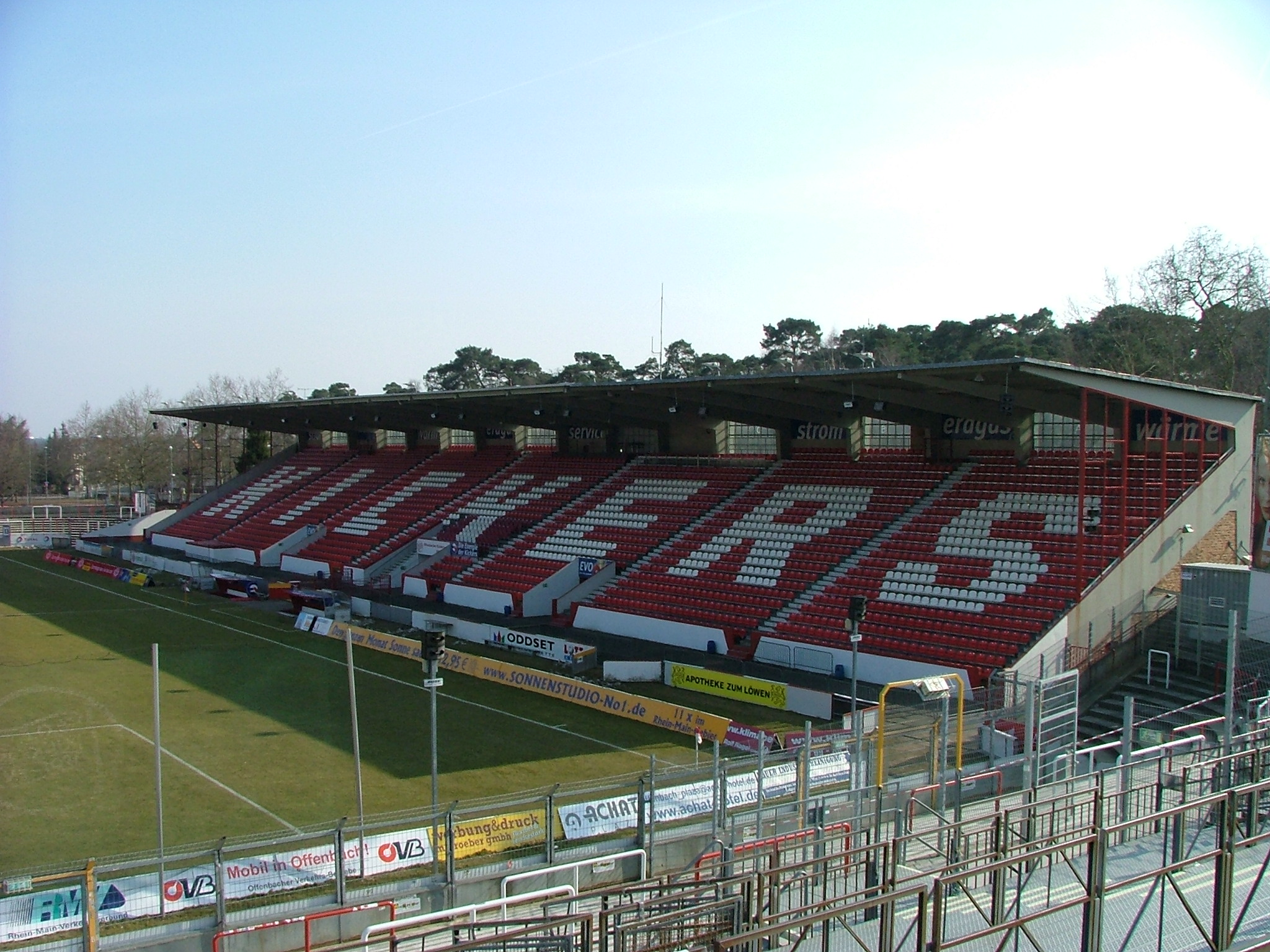
"Old" Stadion am Bieberer Berg (1921–2011)

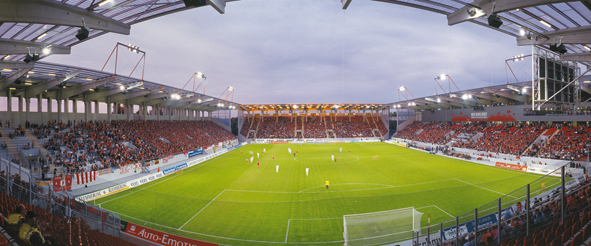
"New" Stadion am Bieberer Berg (opened 2012)

=== Entry to the Bundesliga and scandal ===
The club found itself in the new Regionalliga Süd (II) and play in the Bundesliga would have to wait until 1968. The team was immediately relegated, but returned to the upper league for play in 1970–71. In addition to their return to the Bundesliga, the club would win one of its few honours in 1970 with a 2:1 German Cup victory over 1. FC Köln.

However, the end of the 1971 season would find Kickers Offenbach at the centre of the Bundesliga scandal. The club president, Horst-Gregorio Canellas, went to the German Football Association (Deutsche Fussball Bund or German Football Association) after being approached by a player from another team looking for a cash bonus for that club's effort in beating one of Offenbach's rivals in the fight against relegation. Receiving no help from league officials, Canellas began gathering evidence of how widespread the payoffs were. In the end more than fifty players from seven clubs, two coaches, and six game officials were found guilty of trying to influence the outcome of games through bribes, but Canellas was unable to save his club from relegation. The club central to the scandal – Arminia Bielefeld – would not be punished until the following season, too late to save Offenbach.

The scandal had a negative effect on the young league and contributed to plummeting attendance figures. One outcome of the whole affair was the further evolution of German football; salary restrictions were removed and the 2. Bundesliga also became a professional league. Kickers immediately returned to the top level. The best finish was 7th in the 1972–73 season. They were leaders for 5 rounds and beat Bayern Munich 6–0 in the 1974–75 season but were relegated to the second level in the 1975–76 season.

=== Decline and recovery ===
Kickers spent the next seven years in the 2. Bundesliga before making a return to the Bundesliga for just a single season in 1983–84. In 1985, financial problems led to the club being penalized points and driven into the third division amateur Oberliga Hessen. They recovered, only to be denied a licence in 1989, and were sent back down again. By the mid-1990s they again slipped into the Oberliga Hessen (IV). They appeared in the final of the national amateur championship in 1994 where they lost 1–0 to Preußen Münster. Offenbach returned the 2. Bundesliga in 1999 and were immediately relegated after a 17th-place finish. In each of these seasons the team took part in the national amateur championship, winning the title in 1999.

The club next appeared in the 2. Bundesliga in 2005. After two lower table finishes, Kickers were relegated to the 3. Liga on the final day of the 2007–08 season following a 3–0 defeat to fellow strugglers VfL Osnabrück.

On 18 July 2012, the club's new ground was opened under the name Sparda-Bank-Hessen-Stadion with a pre-season friendly against Bayer Leverkusen. The club was refused a 3. Liga licence at the end of the 2012–13 season and was relegated to the Regionalliga, with SV Darmstadt 98 taking its place. The club, €9 million in debt, could have faced insolvency and a restart at the lowest level of the German football league system.

The club won the Regionalliga Südwest in 2014–15 and earned the right to take part in the promotion round to the 3. Liga, where they missed out on promotion to Magdeburg. The loss was overshadowed by approximately 40 Offenbach supporters storming the field in the 84th minute and forcing a twenty-minute interruption to the return leg.

== Recent seasons ==
The recent season-by-season performance of the team:

=== Kickers Offenbach ===
Season	Division	Tier	Position
1968–1969	1. Bundesliga	I	18th ↓
1970–1971	1. Bundesliga	I	17th ↓
1972–1973	1. Bundesliga	I	7th
1973–1974	1. Bundesliga	I	10th
1974–1975	1. Bundesliga	I	8th
1975–1976	1. Bundesliga	I	17th ↓
1983–1984	1. Bundesliga	I	17th ↓
1994–95	Regionalliga Süd	III	15th ↓
1995–96	Hessenliga	IV	3rd
1996–97	Hessenliga	IV	2nd ↑
1997–98	Regionalliga Süd	III	2nd
1998–99	Regionalliga Süd	III	2nd ↑
1999–2000	2. Bundesliga	II	17th ↓
2000–01	Regionalliga Süd	III	10th
2001–02	Regionalliga Süd	III	8th
2002–03	Regionalliga Süd	III	8th
2003–04	Regionalliga Süd	III	13th
2004–05	Regionalliga Süd	III	1st ↑
2005–06	2. Bundesliga	II	11th
2006–07	2. Bundesliga	II	14th
2007–08	2. Bundesliga	II	15th ↓
2008–09	3. Liga	III	7th
2009–10	3. Liga	III	7th
2010–11	3. Liga	III	7th
2011–12	3. Liga	III	8th
2012–13	3. Liga	III	15th ↓
2013–14	Regionalliga Südwest	IV	8th
2014–15	Regionalliga Südwest	IV	1st
2015–16	Regionalliga Südwest	IV	4th
2016–17	Regionalliga Südwest	IV	12th
2017–18	Regionalliga Südwest	IV	3rd
2018–19	Regionalliga Südwest	IV	5th
2019–20	Regionalliga Südwest	IV	8th
2020–21	Regionalliga Südwest	IV	3rd
2021–22	Regionalliga Südwest	IV	3rd
2022–23	Regionalliga Südwest	IV	7th
2023–24	Regionalliga Südwest	IV	11th
2024–25	Regionalliga Südwest	IV	2nd
2025–26	Regionalliga Südwest	IV	14th

=== Kickers Offenbach II ===
Season	Division	Tier	Position
1999–2000	Oberliga Hessen	IV	15th ↓
2000–01	Landesliga Hessen-Süd	V	3rd
2001–02	Landesliga Hessen-Süd	V	11th
2002–03	Landesliga Hessen-Süd	V	3rd
2003–04	Landesliga Hessen-Süd	V	5th
2004–05	Landesliga Hessen-Süd	V	3rd
2005–06	Landesliga Hessen-Süd	V	9th
2006–07	Landesliga Hessen-Süd	V	3rd
2007–08	Landesliga Hessen-Süd	V	1st ↑
2008–09	Hessenliga	V	4th
2009–10	Hessenliga	V	5th
2010–11	Hessenliga	V	5th
2011–12	Hessenliga	V	12th
2012–13	Hessenliga	V	13th
2013–14	Hessenliga	V	18th ↓
2014–15	Verbandsliga Hessen-Süd	VI	13th
2015–16	Verbandsliga Hessen-Süd	VI	17th ↓
2016–17	Gruppenliga	VII	

↑ Promoted	↓ Relegated

- With the introduction of the Regionalligas in 1994 and the 3. Liga in 2008 as the new third tier, below the 2. Bundesliga, all leagues below dropped one tier. Also in 2008, the majority of football leagues in Hesse were renamed, with the Oberliga Hessen becoming the Hessenliga, the Landesliga becoming the Verbandsliga, the Bezirksoberliga becoming the Gruppenliga and the Bezirksliga becoming the Kreisoberliga.

== Current squad ==
As of 8 September 2026

Note: Flags indicate national team as defined under FIFA eligibility rules; some limited exceptions apply. Players may hold more than one non-FIFA nationality.

No.	Pos.	Nation	Player
1	GK	GER	Johannes Brinkies
3	DF	GER	Maximilian Rossmann
4	DF	GER	Jakob Lewald
5	DF	GER	Alexander Sorge
6	MF	GER	Daniel Dejanović
7	MF	GER	Luka Garic
8	MF	GER	Maximilian Wolfram
9	FW	GER	Maximilian Schmid
10	FW	GER	Jan Becker (on loan from Wehen Wiesbaden)
11	MF	GER	Keanu Staude
14	DF	SLO	Kristjan Arh Česen
16	GK	GER	Angelo Tramontana
17	FW	GER	Benedikt von Hagen
18	DF	GER	Noah Lehmann

No.	Pos.	Nation	Player
19	FW	NED	Jelle Goselink
20	DF	GER	Dominik Črljenec
21	MF	GER	Mohamadaziz Abdelhadi
22	MF	GER	Nathan Doganay
25	FW	MAR	Adam Loune
26	DF	GER	Bastian Frölich
27	DF	GER	Jayson Breitenbach
28	MF	GER	Tom Reuter
30	MF	GER	Alessandro Pistritto
31	DF	MOZ	Ronny Marcos
32	DF	GER	Jan-Hendrik Marx
33	GK	SRB	Nikolas Tatomirović
35	FW	GER	Faris El Ouali
39	MF	GER	Robin Krauße

== Coaches ==
The managers of the club:

Name	Period
Franz Nagy	1922
Rudolf Keller	1926
Mac Pherson	1927
Rudolf Keller	1928
Paul Oßwald	1946–1958
Bogdan Cuvaj	1958–1962
Hans Merkle	1962–1964
Radoslav Momirski	1964–1965
Kurt Baluses	1965 – Feb. 1968
Kurt Schreiner	Mar. – Jun. 1968
Paul Oßwald	Jul. 1968 – Nov. 1969
Kurt Schreiner	Dec. 1969
Willi Keim	Dec. 1969
Zlatko Čajkovski	Jan – Jul. 1970
Kurt Schreiner	Aug. 1970
Aki Schmidt	Sep. 1970
Rudi Gutendorf	Sep. 1970 – Feb. 1971
Kuno Klötzer	Feb. 1971 – Jun. 1972
Gyula Lóránt	Jul. 1972 – Mar. 1974
Otto Rehhagel	Apr. 1974 – Dec. 1975
Zlatko Čajkovski	Jan. – Oct. 1976
Udo Klug	Nov. 1976 – Jun. 1978
Horst Heese	Jul. 1978 – Jun. 1980
Franz Brungs	Jul. 1980 – May 1982
Lothar Buchmann	Jun. 1982 – Mar. 1984
Hermann Nuber	Mar. 1984 – Jun. 1984
Fritz Fuchs	Jul – Dec 1984
Horst Heese	Dec 1984 – Jun 1985
Wilfried Kohls	Jul 1985 – Jun 1986
Franz Brungs	Jul 1986 – May 1987
Robert Jung	May 1987 – Jun 1987
Dieter Renner	Jul 1987 – Mar 1989
Nikolaus Semlitsch	Mar 1989 – Dec 1989
Hans-Günter Neues	Dec 1989 – Apr 1990
Kurt Geinzer	Apr 1990 – Jun 1992
Lothar Buchmann	Jul 1992 – Oct 1994
Valentin Herr	Oct 1994 – Apr 1995
Wilfried Kohls	Maz 1995 – Jun 1995
Wolfgang Uschek	Jul 1995 – Dec 1995
Ronny Borchers	Jan 1996 – Apr 1997
Wilfried Kohls/Jörg Hambückers	Apr 1997 – Jun 1997
Hans-Jürgen Boysen	Jul 1997 – Oct 1999
Peter Neururer	Oct 1999 – Aug 2000
Dragoslav Stepanovic	Aug 2000 – Sep 2000
Knut Hahn	Sep 2000 – Oct 2000
Wilfried Kohls	Oct 2000 – Oct 2000
Knut Hahn	Nov 2000 – Nov 2000
Dieter Müller/Oliver Roth	Nov 2000 – Dec 2000
Ramon Berndroth	Dec 2000 – Aug 2003
Lars Schmidt	Aug 2003 – Mar 2004
Hans-Jürgen Boysen	Mar 2004 – Jan 2006
Wolfgang Frank	Jan 2006 – Oct 2007
Jørn Andersen	Nov 2007 – May 2008
Hans-Jürgen Boysen	May 2008 – Oct 2009
Steffen Menze	Oct 2009 – Feb 2010
Wolfgang Wolf	Feb 2010 – Feb 2011
Thomas Gerstner	Feb 2011 – May 2011
Arie van Lent	May 2011 – Feb 2013
Rico Schmitt	Feb 2013 – Jan 2016
Oliver Reck	Jan 2016 – Jun 2018
Daniel Steuernagel	Jul 2018 – Sep 2019
Steven Keßler	Sep 2019 – Dec 2019
Angelo Barletta	Dec 2019 – Dec 2020
Sreto Ristić	Jan 2021 – Jun 2022
Alexander Schmidt	Jul 2022 – Sep 2022
Ersan Parlatan	Oct 2022 – Apr 2023
Christian Neidhart	Jul 2023 – Jun 2025
Kristjan Glibo	Jul 2025 – Maz 2026

Source: Book "Kickers Offenbach – die ersten hundert jahre" ("Kickers Offenbach – the first hundred years")

== Notable players ==
Past (and present) players who are the subjects of Wikipedia articles can be found here.

- Walter Bechtold
- Matthias Becker
- Uwe Bein
- Egon Bihn
- Manfred Binz
- Fred-Werner Bockholt
- Horst Buhtz
- Saša Ćirić
- Siegfried Gast
- Horst Gecks
- Jimmy Hartwig
- Sigfried Held
- Valentin Herr
- Bernd Helmschrot
- Josef Hickersberger
- Gerhard Kaufhold
- Johann Kondert
- Engelbert Berti Kraus
- Walter Krause
- Sebastian Rode
- André Hahn
- Erwin Kremers
- John Anthony Huffine
- Helmut Kremers
- Erwin Kostedde
- Michael Kutzop
- Dieter Müller
- Hermann Nuber
- Helmut Preisendörfer
- Oliver Reck
- Hans Richter
- Manfred Ritschel
- Winfried Schäfer
- Egon Schmitt
- Nikolaus Semlitsch
- Moses Sichone
- Lothar Skala
- Reinhard Stumpf
- César Thier
- Suat Türker
- Ion Vlădoiu
- Rudi Völler
- Olivier Occean
- Gernot Rohr
- Mamadou Diabang
- Aristide Bancé
- Niko Bungert

== Honours ==
The club's honours:

=== League ===
- German football championship
  - Runners-up: 1950, 1959
- Regionalliga Süd (II)
  - Winners: 1967, 1970, 1972
  - Runners-up: 1966, 1968
- 2. Bundesliga Süd (II)
  - Runners-up: 1981
- Regionalliga Süd (III)
  - Winners: 2005
  - Runners-up: 1998, 1999
- Regionalliga Südwest (IV)
  - Champions: 2015
- Oberliga Hessen (III–IV)
  - Winners: 1986, 1987, 1993
  - Runners-up: 1994, 1997

=== Cup ===
- DFB-Pokal
  - Winners: 1970

=== Reserve team ===
- Landesliga Hessen-Süd (IV–V)
  - Winners: 1984, 1999, 2008
  - Runners-up: 1979, 1983
- Landesliga Hessen-Mitte
  - Winners: 1971

=== Regional ===
- Kreisliga Südmain
  - Winners: 1920, 1922, 1923
- Gauliga Südwest/Mainhessen
  - Winners: 1934, 1940, 1941
- Gauliga Hessen-Nassau
  - Winners: 1942, 1943, 1944
- Oberliga Süd
  - Winners: 1949, 1955
  - Runners-up: 1957, 1959, 1960
- Hesse Cup (Tiers III–VII)
  - Winners: (12) 1949, 1993, 2002, 2003, 2004, 2005, 2009, 2010, 2012, 2014, 2016, 2022, 2024
  - Runners-up: 1950

=== Youth ===
- German Under 19 championship
  - Runners-up: 1973
- German Under 17 championship
  - Runners-up: 1985

== Kickers Offenbach II ==
Kickers second team played in the Amateurliga Hessen (III) from 1971–74 until being disbanded after the 1973–74 season. The reconstituted side reappeared in the Amateuroberliga Hessen (III) in 1984, but were sent down after the relegation of the senior side from the 2. Bundesliga. The amateur's next appearance of note was in the Oberliga Hessen (IV) in 1999 in a campaign that ended in relegation after a 15th-place finish. In 2008–09, it returned to the Hessenliga and finished in fourth place. After six seasons in the league the team finished 18th in the Hessenliga in 2014 and was relegated to the Verbandsliga.

=== Recent managers ===
Recent managers of the team:

Manager	Start	Finish
Steffen Menze	1 July 2005	30 June 2006
Ramon Berndroth	1 July 2006	30 June 2008
Steffen Menze	1 July 2008	30 June 2009
Jürgen Baier	1 July 2009	30 June 2010
Günter Stiebig	1 July 2011	30 June 2013
Alexander Conrad	1 July 2013	Present
