= Ramon Berndroth =

German football manager (born 1952)

Personal information
- Date of birth: 24 March 1952 (age 74)
- Place of birth: Mainz, West Germany
- Height: 1.76 m (5 ft 9 in)
- Position: Midfielder

Senior career*
Years	Team	Apps	(Gls)
1971–1972	Eintracht Frankfurt II		
1972–1978	VfR Bürstadt		

Managerial career
- 1991–1997: Eintracht Frankfurt U23
- 1998–1999: VfB Lübeck
- 2000–2003: Kickers Offenbach
- 2004–2005: VfR Neumünster
- 2005: 1. FC Eschborn
- 2006–2007: Kickers Offenbach II
- 2007: Kickers Offenbach (caretaker)
- 2007–2008: Kickers Offenbach II
- 2008–2009: FSV Frankfurt
- 2009–2010: FSV Frankfurt II
- 2016: Darmstadt 98 (caretaker)
- * Club domestic league appearances and goals

Ramon Berndroth (born 24 March 1952) is a German football manager.

== Managerial career ==
Norbert Meier was sacked as manager of SV Darmstadt 98 and Berndroth became the interim manager on 5 December 2016. His first match was a 1–0 loss to SC Freiburg on 10 December 2016. Berndroth ended up losing all three matches as interim manager. He left Darmstadt on 21 December 2016.
