= Stadion am Bieberer Berg (2012) =

Football stadium in Offenbach, Germany that opened in 2012

Coordinates: 50°05′40″N 8°47′55″E

Plutos Stadion am Bieberer Berg
- Bieberer Berg
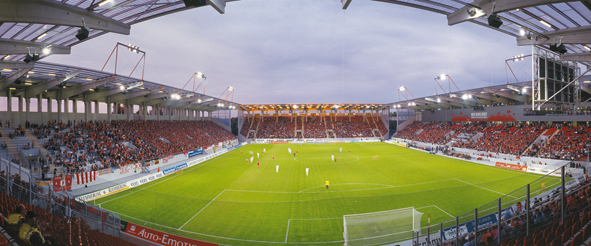
- Interactive map of Plutos Stadion am Bieberer Berg
- Former names: Sparda-Bank-Hessen-Stadion (2012–2020); Kommt-Gesund-Wieder-Stadion (2020–2021)
- Location: Offenbach am Main, Hesse, Germany
- Owner: Stadiongesellschaft Bieberer Berg mbH
- Capacity: 20,500
- Surface: Grass

Construction
- Groundbreaking: 7 February 2011
- Opened: 18 June 2012
- Cost: €25 million
- Architect: Bremer AG

Tenant
- Kickers Offenbach (2012–present)

Stadion am Bieberer Berg is a stadium in Offenbach am Main, Germany. It became the new home of Kickers Offenbach, when it replaced the "old" Stadion am Bieberer Berg. The first game played on the ground was a pre-season friendly between Kickers and Bayer 04 Leverkusen on 18 July 2012, with more than 15,000 fans attending.

The stadium is also a regular host to the Germany national rugby union team's games.

== See also ==
- List of football stadiums in Germany
- Lists of stadiums
