= 2003–04 TSV 1860 Munich season =

TSV 1860 Munich
2003–04 season
- Manager: Falko Götz (until 17 April); Gerald Vanenburg
- Stadium: Olympic Stadium
- Bundesliga: 17th (relegated)
- DFB-Pokal: Second round

== Season summary ==
After several seasons in midtable, Die Löwen's 10-season stay in Germany's top flight ended with a 17th-place finish and relegation. Manager Falko Götz had been sacked in April, with former 1860 player Gerald Vanenburg juggling his duties as manager of PSV's youth team to replace him, but he was unable to save the club from the drop. After relegation, Rudi Bommer, who had led fellow Bavarian club SV Wacker Burghausen to promotion to the 2. Bundesliga and consecutive 10th-place finishes in that division, was tasked with obtaining promotion.

== Kit ==
The club's kits were manufactured by Nike and sponsored by German motor oil company Liqui Moly.

== Players ==
=== First team squad ===
Squad at end of season

Note: Flags indicate national team as defined under FIFA eligibility rules; some limited exceptions apply. Players may hold more than one non-FIFA nationality.

No.	Pos.	Nation	Player
1	GK	GER	Michael Hofmann
2	DF	AUT	Martin Stranzl
3	DF	SUI	Rémo Meyer
4	DF	GER	Marco Kurz
5	DF	FIN	Janne Saarinen
6	MF	CZE	Roman Týce
7	DF	BRA	Rodrigo Costa
8	MF	CHN	Shao Jiayi
9	FW	CMR	Francis Kioyo
11	FW	GER	Benjamin Lauth
12	MF	GER	Danny Schwarz
13	MF	AUT	Harald Cerny
15	DF	BRA	Fernando Santos
16	DF	IRL	Joe Kendrick
18	FW	AUS	Paul Agostino
19	MF	GER	Matthias Lehmann

No.	Pos.	Nation	Player
20	MF	AUT	Markus Weissenberger
21	FW	GER	Markus Schroth
22	GK	GER	André Lenz
23	DF	GER	Andreas Görlitz
24	MF	GER	Daniel Baier
25	MF	BEL	Christophe Lepoint
26	MF	AUT	Marcus Pürk
27	MF	GER	Marcel Richter
28	MF	GER	Gerhard Poschner (Note: Poschner was born in Dumitra, Romania, but was raised in Germany from the age of 5 and represented Germany at U-21 and U-23 level.)
29	GK	GER	Matthias Küfner
32	DF	GER	Christoph Burkhard
33	MF	RSA	Lance Davids
35	DF	GER	Marcel Schäfer
36	DF	GER	Christoph Janker
44	DF	GER	Torben Hoffmann

=== Left club during season ===
Note: Flags indicate national team as defined under FIFA eligibility rules; some limited exceptions apply. Players may hold more than one non-FIFA nationality.

No. / Pos. / Nation / Player; 14 / MF / GER / Michael Wiesinger (to Energie Cottbus)	No. / Pos. / Nation / Player; 17 / DF / GER / Daniel Borimirov (to Magdeburg)

== Competitions ==
=== Legend ===
Win Draw Loss Postponed

=== Bundesliga ===
==== League table ====
Pos	Team	Pld	W	D	L	GF	GA	GD	Pts	Qualification or relegation
14	Hannover 96	34	9	10	15	49	63	−14	37	
15	1. FC Kaiserslautern (Note: 1. FC Kaiserslautern were docked three points for financial irregularities.)	34	11	6	17	39	62	−23	36	
16	Eintracht Frankfurt (R)	34	9	5	20	36	53	−17	32	Relegation to 2. Bundesliga
17	1860 Munich (R)	34	8	8	18	32	55	−23	32	Relegation to 2. Bundesliga
18	1. FC Köln (R)	34	6	5	23	32	57	−25	23	Relegation to 2. Bundesliga

Source: kicker.de
Rules for classification: 1) points; 2) goal difference; 3) number of goals scored.
(R) Relegated
