= Kurt Geinzer =

German footballer

Personal information
- Date of birth: 3 July 1948
- Place of birth: Erlangen, Germany
- Position: Defender

Senior career*
Years	Team	Apps	(Gls)
1969–1971	SpVgg Bayreuth		
1971–1977	1. FC Nürnberg		
1977–1983	Kickers Offenbach		

Managerial career
- 1982: Kickers Offenbach
- 1985–1986: Viktoria Aschaffenburg
- 1988–1989: Viktoria Aschaffenburg
- 1990–1992: Kickers Offenbach
- 1995–1998: Viktoria Aschaffenburg
- * Club domestic league appearances and goals

Kurt Geinzer (born 3 July 1948) is a retired German football defender and later manager.
