= Valentin Herr =

German footballer

Personal information
- Date of birth: 11 July 1957
- Height: 1.87 m (6 ft 2 in)
- Position: Goalkeeper

Senior career*
Years	Team	Apps	(Gls)
1975–1976	FC Rastatt 04		
1977–1979	SV Kuppenheim		
1979–1980	Bayer Leverkusen II		
1980–1982	Bayer Leverkusen		
1982–1984	Kickers Offenbach		
1984–1986	Alemannia Aachen		
1986–1987	Viktoria Aschaffenburg		
1987–1989	Waldhof Mannheim		

Managerial career
- 1989–1991: Waldhof Mannheim (assistant)
- 1991: Waldhof Mannheim
- 1991–1993: Waldhof Mannheim (assistant)
- 1993–1994: Waldhof Mannheim
- 1994–1995: Kickers Offenbach
- 1996: Eintracht Trier
- 2000: Borussia Neunkirchen
- 2002–2006: FV Lauda
- 2006–2007: FC Emmendingen
- * Club domestic league appearances and goals

Valentin Herr (born 1 July 1957) is a German former football manager and player who played as a goalkeeper.
