= Maximilian Zaiser =

German footballer (born 1999)

Personal information
- Date of birth: 8 March 1999 (age 27)
- Place of birth: Rosenheim, Germany
- Height: 1.76 m (5 ft 9 in)
- Position: Midfielder

Team information
- Current team: Stuttgarter Kickers
- Number: 18

Youth career
- –2012: TSV 1860 Rosenheim
- 2012–2018: Bayern Munich

Senior career*
Years	Team	Apps	(Gls)
2018–2021	Bayern Munich II	40	(3)
2021–2022	TSG Hoffenheim II	28	(1)
2022–2025	Würzburger Kickers	101	(14)
2025–	Stuttgarter Kickers	26	(3)
- * Club domestic league appearances and goals as of 24 September 2026

Maximilian Zaiser (born 8 March 1999) is a German footballer who plays as a midfielder for Regionalliga Südwest club Stuttgarter Kickers.

== Professional career ==
Zaiser made his professional debut with FC Bayern Munich II in a 1–1 3. Liga draw with Eintracht Braunschweig on 6 June 2020.

On 14 June 2022, Zaiser signed with recently relegated Regionalliga Bayern club Würzburger Kickers.

== Career statistics ==
As of match played 17 November 2023

Appearances and goals by club, season and competition
Club	Season	League			DFB-Pokal		Other		Total	
Club	Season	Division	Apps	Goals	Apps	Goals	Apps	Goals	Apps	Goals
Bayern Munich II	2018–19	Regionalliga Bayern	12	0	—		—		12	0
Bayern Munich II	2019–20	3. Liga	5	0	—		—		5	0
Bayern Munich II	2020–21	3. Liga	23	3	—		—		23	3
Bayern Munich II	Total		40	3	—		—		40	3
TSG Hoffenheim II	2021–22	Regionalliga Südwest	28	1	—		—		28	1
Würzburger Kickers	2022–23	Regionalliga Bayern	38	12	—		5 (Note: Appearances in the Bavarian Cup)	0	43	12
Würzburger Kickers	2023–24	Regionalliga Bayern	21	1	—		3	0	24	1
Würzburger Kickers	Total		59	13	—		8	0	67	13
Career Total			127	17	0	0	8	0	135	17
