= Stadion am Bieberer Berg (1921) =

Stadium in Offenbach, Germany that opened in 1921

Coordinates: 50°05′40″N 8°47′55″E

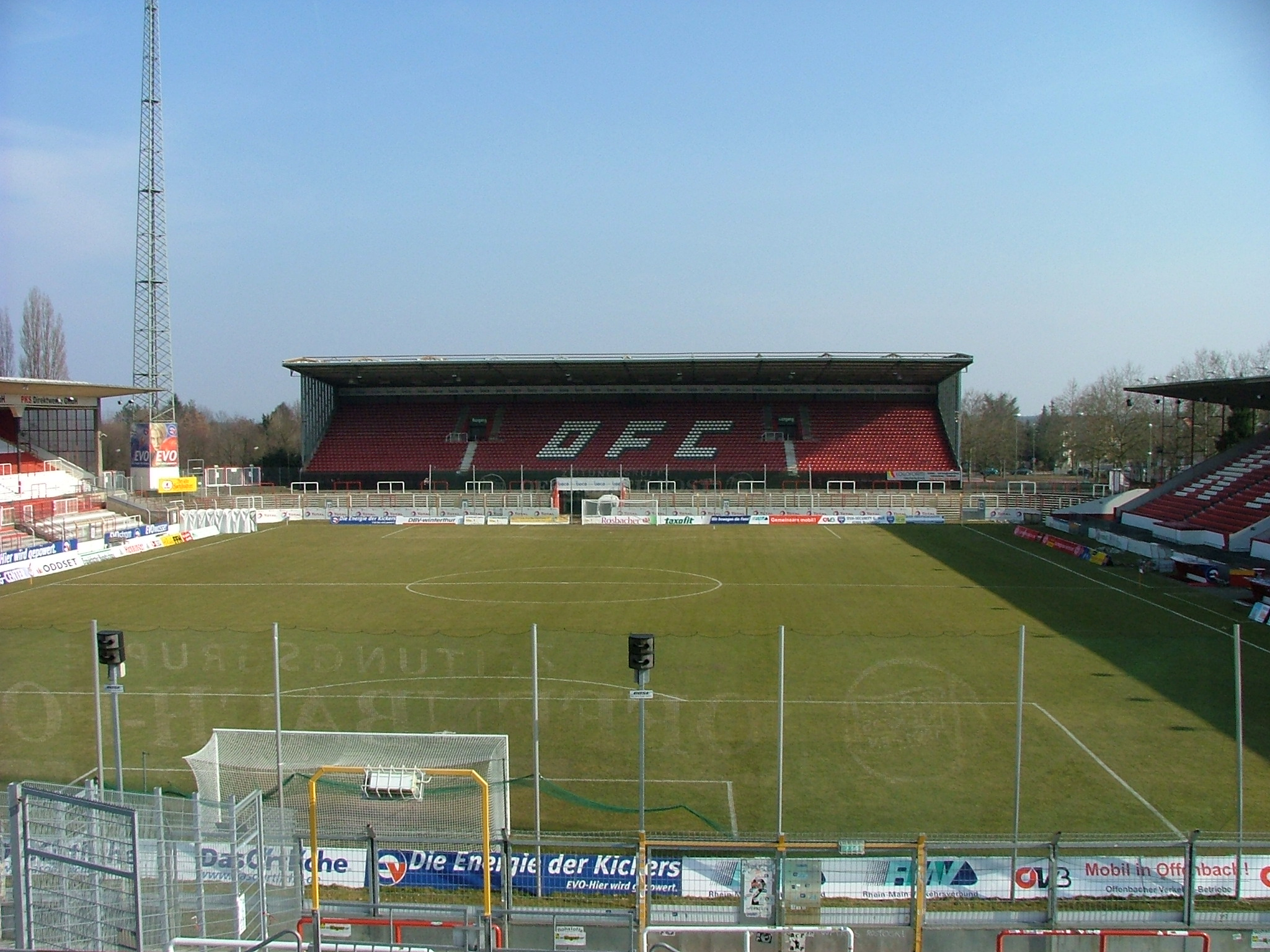
Stadion am Bieberer Berg in 2006

The Stadion am Bieberer Berg was a multi-purpose stadium in Offenbach am Main, Germany. The stadium was built in 1921 and held 26,500 people. Situated between Offenbach city centre and Bieber on Bieberer Berg, it was the home ground of the football club Kickers Offenbach. It was demolished in 2011 while matches were still being played and replaced by the Sparda-Bank-Hessen-Stadion, which was opened in 2012 and has borne the name of the old stadium again since 2021.

David Bowie performed at the old stadium during his Serious Moonlight Tour on 24 June 1983 and during his Earthling Tour on 8 June 1997.
