= Wilfried Kohls =

German footballer

Personal information
- Date of birth: 12 October 1950
- Position: Goalkeeper

Senior career*
Years	Team	Apps	(Gls)
1974–1982	Kickers Offenbach		

Managerial career
- 1985–1986: Kickers Offenbach
- 1995: Kickers Offenbach
- 1997: Kickers Offenbach
- 2000: Kickers Offenbach
- * Club domestic league appearances and goals

Wilfried Kohls (born 12 October 1950) is a German former professional footballer, who played as a goalkeeper, and later manager.
