= Markus Hoffmann (footballer) =

Austrian footballer and manager

Personal information
- Date of birth: 29 June 1972 (age 54)
- Place of birth: Salzburg, Austria
- Height: 1.80 m (5 ft 11 in)
- Position: Forward

Youth career
- 1989–1992: Austria Salzburg

Senior career*
Years	Team	Apps	(Gls)
1992–1999	FC Braunau	84	(19)
1999–2001	SV Wacker Burghausen	35	(2)
2001–2002	PSV SW Salzburg	16	(0)
2002–2011	Seekirchen	157	(21)

Managerial career
- 2008–2011: Seekirchen
- * Club domestic league appearances and goals

Markus Hoffmann (born 29 June 1972) is an Austrian football manager and former footballer who played as a forward.
