= Peter Sirch =

German footballer

Personal information
- Date of birth: 30 December 1961 (age 64)
- Place of birth: Immenstadt, West Germany
- Position: Goalkeeper

Team information
- Current team: Bayern Munich (Youth Goalkeeper Coach)

Youth career
- 1969–1981: FC Immenstadt
- 1981–1982: TSV Berchtesgaden

Senior career*
Years	Team	Apps	(Gls)
1982–1985	1860 Munich (A)		
1982–1984	1860 Munich	3	(0)
1985–1989	Bayern Munich (A)		
1988–1989	Bayern Munich	0	(0)
1989–1991	Austria Salzburg	23	(0)
1991–2002	SpVgg Unterhaching	6	(0)

Managerial career
- 1996–2003: SpVgg Unterhaching (goalkeeper coach)
- 2003–2006: TSV 1860 München (goalkeeper coach)
- 2008–: Bayern Munich (youth goalkeeper coach)
- * Club domestic league appearances and goals

Peter Sirch (born 30 December 1961) is a German former footballer who played as a goalkeeper. He is now a goalkeeper coach with Bayern Munich's youth team.
