= Franz Xaver Oberleitner =

Austrian theologian and orientalist

- Born: 12 January 1789; Angern an der March, Holy Roman Empire
- Died: 10 June 1832 (aged 43); Vienna, Austria
- Other name: Andreas Oberleitner
- Occupations: Orientalist; Benedictine theologian; Archivist

Franz Xaver Oberleitner (12 January 1789 – 10 June 1832) was an Austrian theologian and orientalist. Oberleitner served as the Dean of The University of Vienna's Faculty of Catholic Theology for a period of three separate years, as the Director of Theology and as the University Archivist.

His text books on his specialist languages were considerable achievements which remained valued tools for scholars long after his death on account of their practical structures.

== Confusion over his names ==
Franz Xaver Oberleitner is identified in some sources as "Andreas Oberleitner". This is the name given in Volume 24 of the Allgemeine Deutsche Biographie (ADB) (1886), a work of reference on which much subsequent reliance is placed. The ADB entry names Andreas Leitner and then provides two paragraphs on his career and published output as an orientalist.

Sources closer in time and place to Oberleitner himself, including Volume 20 of the Biographisches Lexikon des Kaiserthums Oesterreich (1869) state that there were two brothers involved. Andreas Oberleitner was born in 1786, and as a young man acquired a certain notability in Vienna as a musician (instrumentalist), although by the 1860s it was not known whether or not he was still alive. Oberleitner was born in 1789. He was the theologian / orientalist according to these sources. It appears that conflation of the two brothers' names had not started in 1832, which is when Oberleitner died. (Note: German language Wikipedia has picked up on this, identifying Andreas Oberleitner in its opening line as ".... eigentlich Franz Xaver Oberleitner" (actually Franz Xaver Oberleitner), respecting the conflicting sources.)

== Life ==
Oberleitner was born at the house of the local landowner at Angern an der March, a small town a short distance to the north of Vienna. His father, Andreas Oberleitner had an administrative position locally, working for the Kinsky family. It is known that there were numerous Oberleitner siblings. Oberleitner attended school in nearby Gaunersdorf (since 1917 known as Gaweinstal) where he was taught to sing and to play the violin. His musical talent led to his acceptance, at the age of 10, into the Vienna Boys' Choir. This involved relocation to Vienna where he attended the St Anna Gymnasium (secondary school). In 1807 he entered the Schottenstift, a Benedictine monastery in the city. Between 1808 and 1812 he studied Theology at the University of Vienna: on 30 August 1812 he was consecrated as a priest.

== Published output ==
The following is an incomplete list of Oberleitner's publications:

- Joannis Jahn Elementa aramaicae seu chaldaeo-syriacae linguae, latine reddita, et nonnullis accessionibus aucta. Vienna 1820.
- Fundamenta linguae arabicae. Vienna 1822.
- Chrestomathia arabica una cum glossario arabico-latino. 2 volumes, Vienna 1823–1824.
- Chrestomathia syriaca una cum glossario syriaco-latino. 2 volumes, Vienna 1826–1827.

It was also in 1812 that he became "Student overseer" ("Studienpräfekt ") at the monastery. From 1813 till 1816 he took on the teaching of "Humanities" at the Schottenstift. At the same time he was attending classes provided by a Maronite priest called Anton Aryda at the university on Arabic, Syriac and Aramaic languages. Aryda returned to Syria in 1816 and Oberleitner was appointed to replace him as university professor for Oriental Languages and Biblical criticism. In 1817 he received his Doctorate in Theology. It was as an orientalist, however, that he rapidly acquired an outstanding reputation, enhanced by a succession of publications on the Arabic and Syriac grammar and languages.

In 1818/1819, 1819/1820 and again in 1825/1826 Oberleitner was Dean of the University of Vienna's Faculty of Catholic Theology. From 1823 he also served as University Archivist. In 1832, he was appointed university Director of Theology. 1832 was also the year in which, unexpectedly, he died aged 43.
