= Christian Springer =

German footballer

Personal information
- Date of birth: 15 July 1971 (age 55)
- Place of birth: Forchheim, Germany
- Height: 1.85 m (6 ft 1 in)
- Position: Midfielder

Youth career
- Baiersdorfer SV
- TSV Vestenbergsgreuth
- SpVgg Jahn Forchheim

Senior career*
Years	Team	Apps	(Gls)
–1994	SpVgg Jahn Forchheim		
1994–1998	FC St. Pauli	89	(8)
1998–2006	1. FC Köln	205	(28)
- * Club domestic league appearances and goals

Christian Springer (born 15 July 1971) is a German former professional footballer who played as a midfielder.
