= Peter Zeiler =

German footballer

Personal information
- Date of birth: 8 October 1970 (age 56)
- Height: 1.70 m (5 ft 7 in)
- Position: Midfielder

Youth career
- 1977–1989: FC Amberg

Senior career*
Years	Team	Apps	(Gls)
1989–1990	FC Amberg		
1990–1994	TSV 1860 Munich	35	(0)
1994–2002	SpVgg Unterhaching	112	(8)
- * Club domestic league appearances and goals

Peter Zeiler (born 8 October 1970) is a German former footballer. He spent 2 seasons in the Bundesliga with SpVgg Unterhaching.
