= Knut Hahn =

German footballer

Personal information
- Date of birth: 19 December 1964
- Height: 1.80 m (5 ft 11 in)
- Position: Midfielder

Senior career*
Years	Team	Apps	(Gls)
1983–1990	Kickers Offenbach		
1990–1994	VfR Bürstadt		
1994–1996	SV Sandhausen		

Managerial career
- Sep–Oct 2000: Kickers Offenbach
- Nov 2000: Kickers Offenbach
- * Club domestic league appearances and goals

Knut Hahn (born 19 December 1964) is a German former professional footballer who played as a midfielder.
