= Weligton =

Brazilian footballer (born 1979)

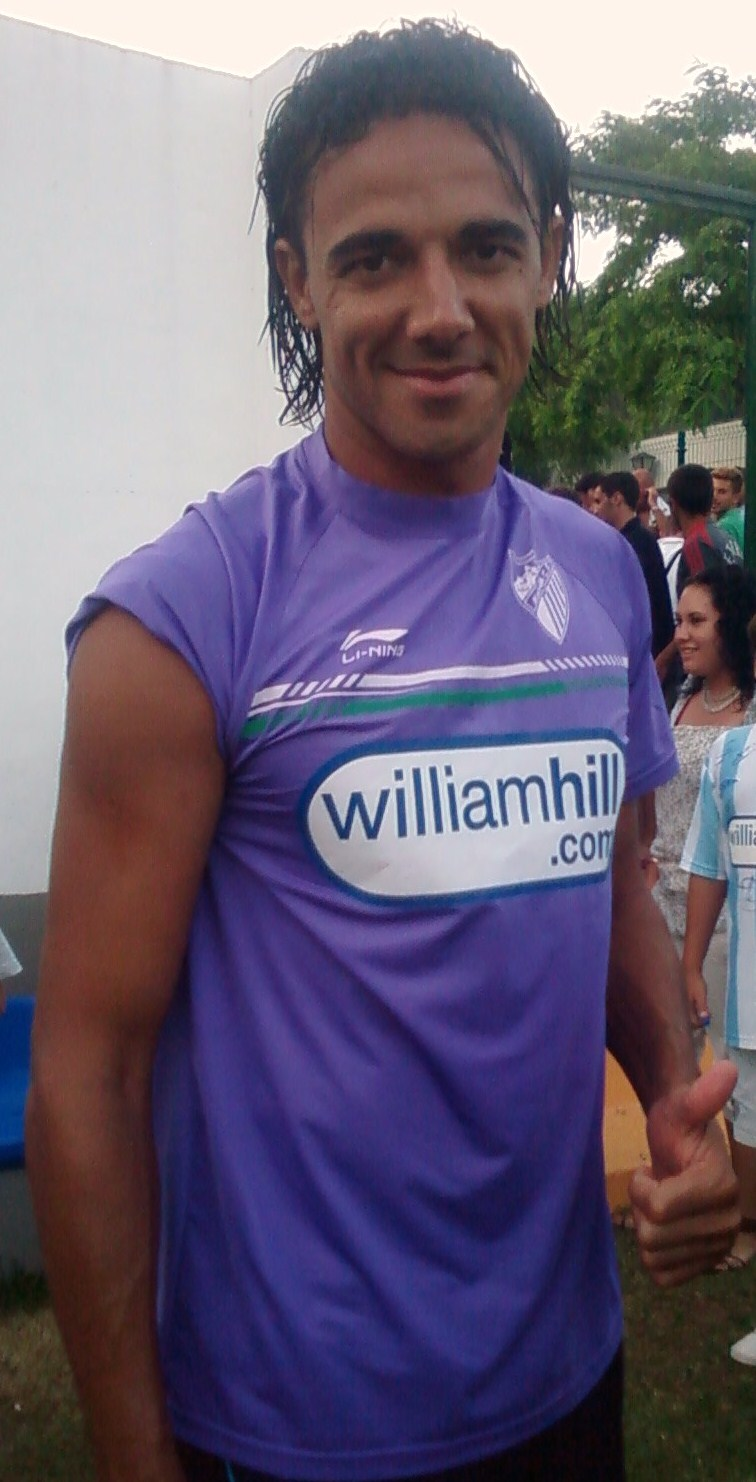
- Weligton in 2010

Personal information
- Full name: Weligton Robson Pena de Oliveira
- Date of birth: 26 August 1979 (age 47)
- Place of birth: Fernandópolis, Brazil
- Height: 1.86 m (6 ft 1 in)
- Position: Centre-back

Senior career*
Years	Team	Apps	(Gls)
1997–1998	Olímpia		
1998–2000	Campinense		
2000–2001	Jalesense		
2001–2002	Barretos		
2002–2003	Paraná	9	(0)
2003–2006	Penafiel	90	(0)
2006–2008	Grasshoppers	30	(1)
2007–2008	→ Málaga (loan)	38	(0)
2008–2017	Málaga	217	(9)
Total		384+	(10+)
- * Club domestic league appearances and goals

Weligton Robson Pena de Oliveira (born 26 August 1979), known simply as Weligton, is a Brazilian former footballer who played as a central defender.

He started playing professional football already well in his 20s, and spent the vast majority of his career with Málaga. He also competed in Portugal and Switzerland.

== Club career ==
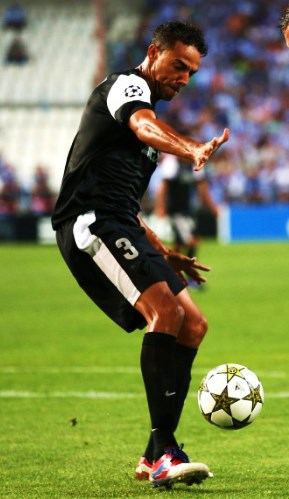
Weligton in action for Málaga in 2012

Weligton was born in Fernandópolis, São Paulo. He started his professional career with Paraná Clube at the age of already 23, joining Portugal's F.C. Penafiel on 13 August 2003 with the club in the Segunda Liga. After achieving promotion to the Primeira Liga, he was first choice for a further two seasons, with relegation befalling in 2006.

Subsequently, Weligton signed with Grasshopper Club Zürich. After just one season in Switzerland, he was loaned to Spanish Segunda División side Málaga CF, and was an essential defensive unit in another career promotion, only missing four league games out of 42.

The move was made permanent on 18 June 2008, as Weligton agreed to a four-year deal. He scored his first goal for the Andalusians on 17 May of the following year against Sporting de Gijón, in a 2–1 away loss.

An undisputed starter again in 2009–10, Weligton suffered a serious ankle injury on 14 March 2010 in a 1–0 defeat at UD Almería, going on to miss the rest of the campaign. He made his 100th league appearance for the club on 16 October, alongside teammate Apoño, in a 1–4 home loss to Real Madrid.

After the summer signing of Joris Mathijsen, Weligton found himself more often than not as a substitute. His first league appearance in 2011–12 was on 11 December 2011, in a 1−1 home draw against CA Osasuna. On 15 May 2012, he renewed his contract for a further year.

Weligton broke his collarbone in a 2013 pre-season friendly with Aston Villa following a shoulder barge from opposing player Christian Benteke. He was sidelined for several weeks, and on 8 October he agreed to a further two-year extension to keep him at the La Rosaleda Stadium until June 2015.

Weligton missed the vast majority of the 2016–17 season, due to a meniscus injury to his right knee. In May 2017, the 37-year-old announced his retirement from football.
