= Oberliga =

Oberliga (English: Premier league) may refer to:

== Association football ==
- Oberliga (football), currently the fifth tier of the German football league system, formerly the first
- DDR-Oberliga, the first tier of football in East Germany until 1990, replaced by the NOFV-Oberliga
- NOFV-Oberliga, replaced the DDR-Oberliga in 1990, now the fifth tier of football in the region

== Ice hockey ==
- Austrian Oberliga
- Oberliga (ice hockey), formerly the first tier, now the third tier of ice hockey in Germany

== Handball ==
- DDR-Oberliga (women's handball), the former women's championship in East Germany
- DDR-Oberliga Handball, the former men's championship in East Germany
