= Oliver Straube =

German footballer and coach

Personal information
- Date of birth: 13 December 1971 (age 54)
- Place of birth: Schwaikheim, Germany
- Height: 1.78 m (5 ft 10 in)
- Position: Midfielder

Youth career
- TSV Schwaikheim
- Stuttgarter Kickers

Senior career*
Years	Team	Apps	(Gls)
–1993	TSF Ditzingen		
1993–1996	1. FC Nürnberg	57	(6)
1996–1998	KFC Uerdingen 05	49	(3)
1998–1999	Hamburger SV	6	(0)
1999–2003	SpVgg Unterhaching	91	(8)
2003–2004	Jahn Regensburg	17	(2)
2004–2005	TuS Koblenz	20	(6)
2006	ASV Neumarkt		
- * Club domestic league appearances and goals

Oliver Straube (born 13 December 1971) is a German former professional footballer who played as a midfielder. He spent four seasons in the Bundesliga with 1. FC Nürnberg, Hamburger SV and SpVgg Unterhaching.
