= Ralf Bucher =

German footballer and manager

Personal information
- Date of birth: 6 April 1972 (age 54)
- Place of birth: Munich, West Germany
- Height: 1.82 m (6 ft 0 in)
- Position: Defender

Youth career
- 1979–1989: TSV Neubiberg

Senior career*
Years	Team	Apps	(Gls)
1989–2009	SpVgg Unterhaching	310	(2)

Managerial career
- 2010: SpVgg Unterhaching (Team coordinator)
- * Club domestic league appearances and goals

Ralf Bucher (born 6 April 1972 in Munich) is a former German football player and current manager.

== Career ==
He spent all of his professional career so far with SpVgg Unterhaching, including two seasons in the Bundesliga as team captain and retired on 2 July 2009.
