= Danny Schwarz =

German footballer (born 1975)

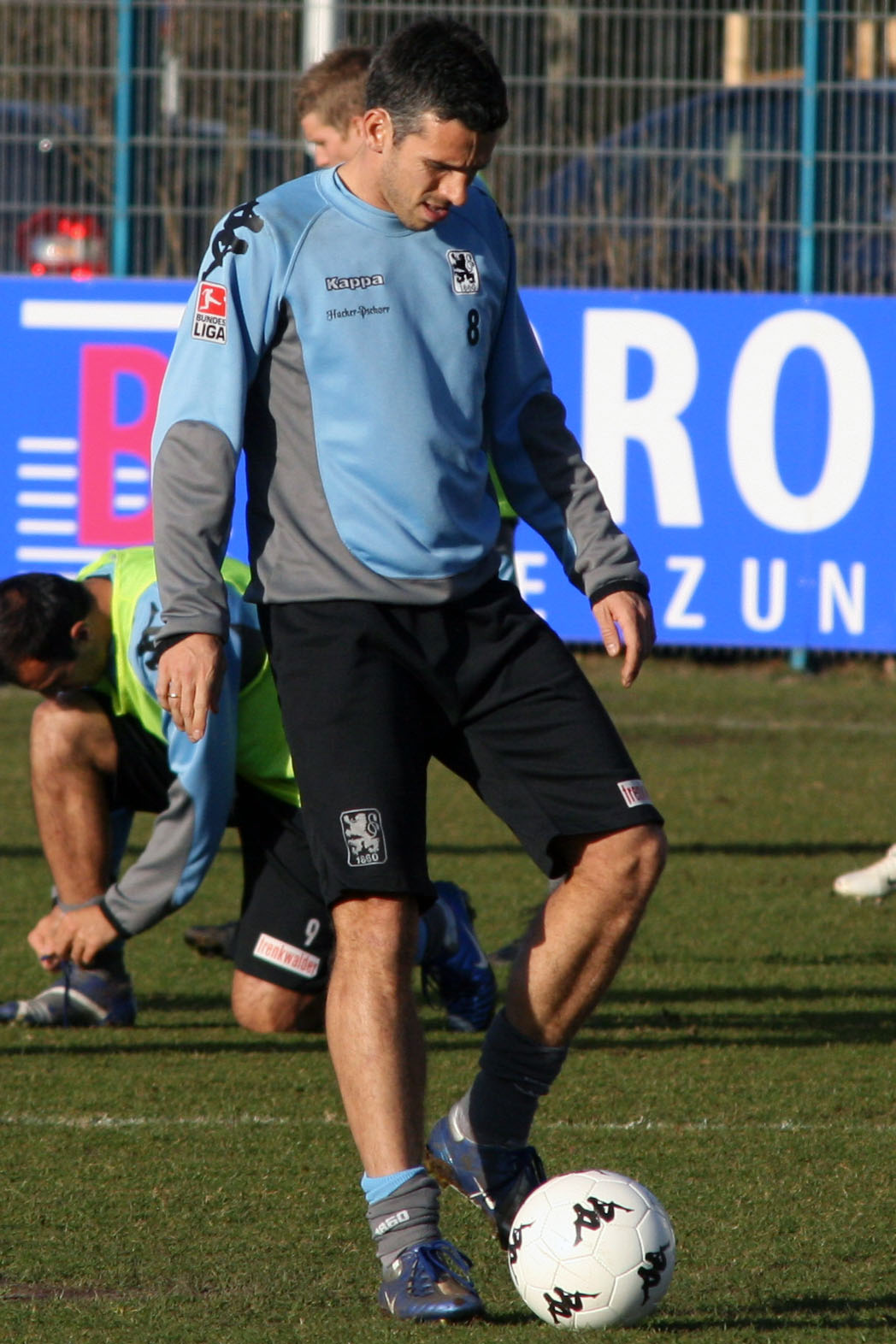
- Schwarz with 1860 Munich in 2007

Personal information
- Date of birth: 11 May 1975 (age 51)
- Place of birth: Göppingen, West Germany
- Height: 1.83 m (6 ft 0 in)
- Position: Defensive midfielder

Youth career
- –1995: 1. FC Eislingen

Senior career*
| Years | Team | Apps | (Gls) |
| 1995–1998 | VfB Stuttgart | 28 | (1) |
| 1998–1999 | Karlsruher SC | 31 | (4) |
| 1999–2002 | SpVgg Unterhaching | 98 | (6) |
| 2002–2004 | 1860 Munich | 26 | (3) |
| 2004–2006 | Karlsruher SC | 56 | (10) |
| 2006–2009 | 1860 Munich | 68 | (3) |
| 2009–2012 | Bayern Munich II | 47 | (1) |
| Total | | 354 | (28) |

International career
| 1998 | Germany U-21 | 2 | (1) |
| 1999–2001 | Germany B | 3 | (0) |

Managerial career
- 2017: Bayern Munich II (caretaker)
- 2021: Bayern Munich II
- 2021–2022: Würzburger Kickers
- 2023–2024: FC 08 Homburg
- * Club domestic league appearances and goals

Danny Schwarz (born 11 May 1975) is a German football coach and former player who was most recently the manager of FC 08 Homburg. He played as a defensive midfielder.

== Playing career ==
Schwarz was born in Göppingen. He played for VfB Stuttgart between the 1995–96 season and 1997–98 season, Karlsruher SC during the 1998–99 season, SpVgg Unterhaching between the 1999–2000 season and the 2001–02 season, and 1860 Munich during the 2002–03 season and 2003–04 season. He returns to Karlsruhe and 1860 Munich. He also played for the reserve team. He finished his playing career at Bayern Munich II.

== Coaching career ==
He was interim head coach for Bayern's reserve team from 23 March 2017 until the end of the season. He finished with a record of five wins and four draws in nine matches. He then managed the under-17 team of Bayern Munich. On 2 April 2021, Bayern Munich announced that Schwarz and Martín Demichelis would replace Holger Seitz as Bayern's reserve team manager. Bayern also announced that Seitz's last match would be against VfB Lübeck on 3 April 2021.

On 13 October 2021, he was appointed as the new head coach of Würzburger Kickers. He was sacked on 10 February 2022. He won one match, drew five matches and lost seven matches as head coach of Würzburger Kickers.

In May 2023, it was announced that Schwarz would become new manager of FC 08 Homburg. He was sacked by Homburg on 3 December 2024.

== Career statistics ==
=== Club ===
Appearances and goals by club, season and competition
| Club | Season | League | | | Cup | | Other | | Total | |
| Club | Season | Division | Apps | Goals | Apps | Goals | Apps | Goals | Apps | Goals |
|---|---|---|---|---|---|---|---|---|---|---|
| VfB Stuttgart | 1995–96 | Bundesliga | 9 | 0 | 0 | 0 | 0 | 0 | 9 | 0 |
| VfB Stuttgart | 1996–97 | Bundesliga | 7 | 1 | 2 | 0 | 1 (Note: Appearances in the UEFA Intertoto Cup.) | 0 | 10 | 1 |
| VfB Stuttgart | 1997–98 | Bundesliga | 12 | 0 | 3 | 0 | 4 (Note: Appearances in the DFL-Ligapokal & UEFA Cup Winners' Cup.) | 0 | 19 | 0 |
| VfB Stuttgart | Total | | 28 | 1 | 5 | 0 | 5 | 0 | 38 | 1 |
| Karlsruher SC | 1998–99 | 2. Bundesliga | 31 | 4 | 0 | 0 | — | | 31 | 4 |
| SpVgg Unterhaching | 1999–2000 | Bundesliga | 34 | 2 | 1 | 0 | — | | 35 | 2 |
| SpVgg Unterhaching | 2000–01 | Bundesliga | 34 | 1 | 2 | 0 | — | | 36 | 1 |
| SpVgg Unterhaching | 2001–02 | 2. Bundesliga | 30 | 3 | 2 | 1 | — | | 32 | 4 |
| SpVgg Unterhaching | Total | | 98 | 6 | 5 | 1 | — | | 103 | 7 |
| 1860 Munich | 2002–03 | Bundesliga | 8 | 0 | 1 | 0 | 1 | 0 | 10 | 0 |
| 1860 Munich | 2003–04 | Bundesliga | 18 | 3 | 2 | 0 | — | | 20 | 3 |
| 1860 Munich | Total | | 26 | 3 | 3 | 0 | 1 | 0 | 30 | 3 |
| Karlsruher SC | 2004–05 | 2. Bundesliga | 24 | 5 | 1 | 0 | — | | 25 | 5 |
| Karlsruher SC | 2005–06 | 2. Bundesliga | 32 | 5 | 2 | 0 | — | | 34 | 5 |
| Karlsruher SC | Total | | 56 | 10 | 3 | 0 | — | | 59 | 10 |
| 1860 Munich | 2006–07 | 2. Bundesliga | 28 | 1 | 1 | 0 | — | | 29 | 1 |
| 1860 Munich | 2007–08 | 2. Bundesliga | 30 | 2 | 4 | 1 | — | | 34 | 3 |
| 1860 Munich | 2008–09 | 2. Bundesliga | 10 | 0 | 1 | 0 | — | | 11 | 0 |
| 1860 Munich | Total | | 68 | 3 | 6 | 1 | — | | 74 | 4 |
| 1860 Munich II | 2006–07 | Regionalliga Süd | 1 | 0 | — | | — | | 1 | 0 |
| 1860 Munich II | 2007–08 | Regionalliga Süd | 1 | 0 | — | | — | | 1 | 0 |
| 1860 Munich II | 2008–09 | Regionalliga Süd | 3 | 0 | — | | — | | 3 | 0 |
| 1860 Munich II | Total | | 5 | 0 | — | | — | | 5 | 0 |
| Bayern Munich II | 2009–10 | 3. Liga | 33 | 0 | — | | — | | 33 | 0 |
| Bayern Munich II | 2010–11 | 3. Liga | 14 | 1 | — | | — | | 14 | 1 |
| Bayern Munich II | Total | | 47 | 1 | — | | — | | 47 | 1 |
| Career total | | | 359 | 28 | 22 | 2 | 6 | 0 | 387 | 30 |

=== Managerial record ===
As of match played 30 November 2024

| Team | From | To | Record | | | | | Ref. |
| Team | From | To | M | W | D | L | Win % | Ref. |
|---|---|---|---|---|---|---|---|---|
| Bayern Munich II | 21 March 2017 | 30 June 2017 | 9 | 5 | 4 | 0 | 55.56 | |
| Bayern Munich II | 4 April 2021 | 30 June 2021 | 8 | 0 | 4 | 4 | 0.00 | |
| Würzburger Kickers | 13 October 2021 | 9 February 2022 | 13 | 1 | 5 | 7 | 7.69 | |
| FC 08 Homburg | 1 July 2023 | 3 December 2024 | 62 | 30 | 14 | 18 | 48.39 | |
| Total | | | 92 | 36 | 27 | 29 | 39.13 | — |

1.Bayern Munich stated Danny Schwarz is co-manager with Martin Demichelis.

== Honours ==
Stuttgart

- DFB-Pokal: 1996–97
