= Holger Seitz =

German football player and manager (born 1974)

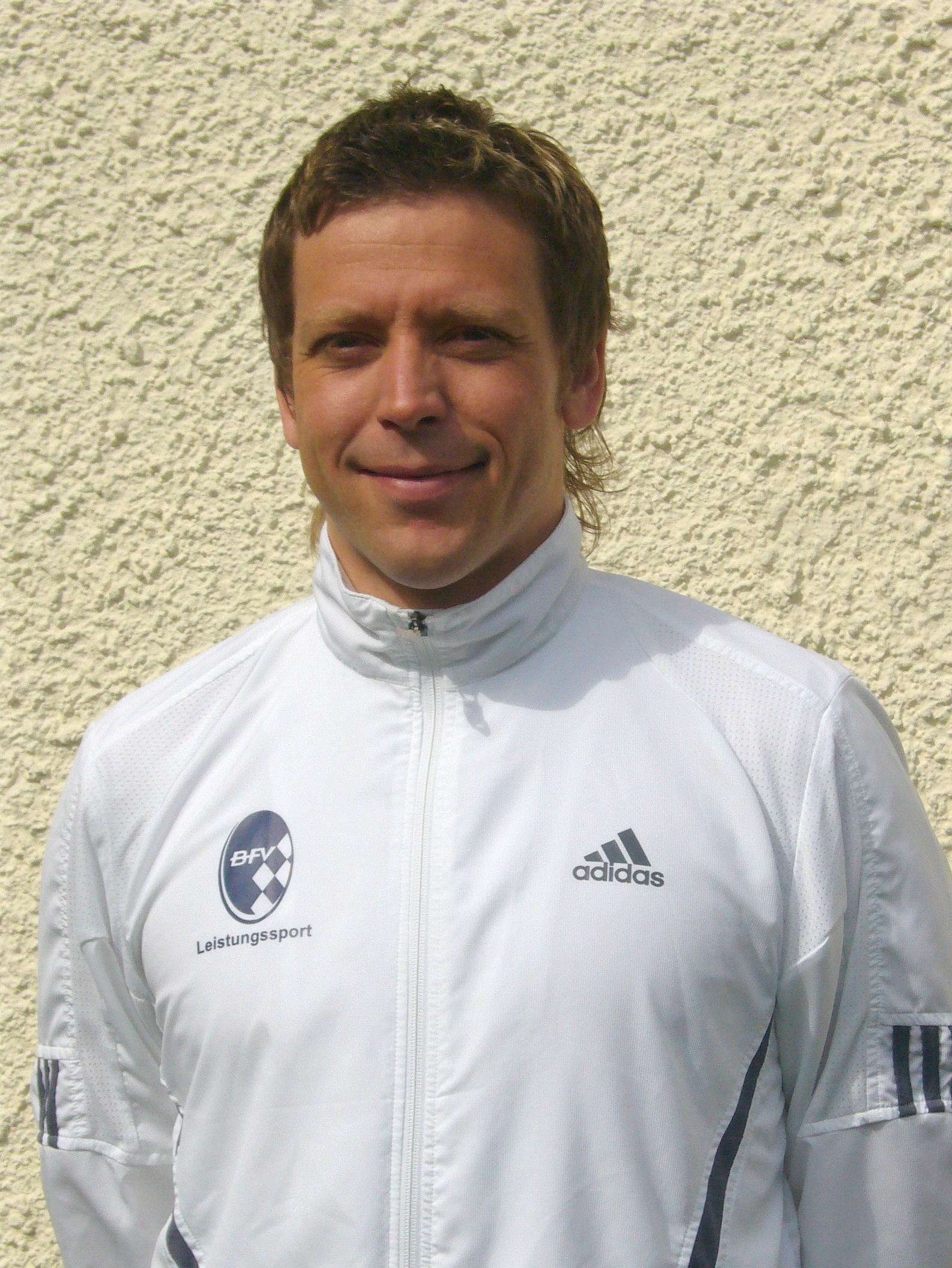
- Seitz in 2010

Personal information
- Date of birth: 9 October 1974 (age 52)
- Place of birth: Simbach am Inn, West Germany
- Height: 1.82 m (6 ft 0 in)
- Position: Midfielder

Youth career
- 1990–1992: 1. FC Passau
- 1992–1993: 1. FC Nürnberg

Senior career*
Years	Team	Apps	(Gls)
1993–1994	1. FC Nürnberg II		
1994–1995	Greuther Fürth		
1996–2000	Bayern Munich II	27	(1)
2000–2002	Karlsruher SC	43	(1)
2002–2004	Darmstadt 98	21	(1)
2004–2007	SC Fürstenfeldbruck	19	(0)

Managerial career
- 2018–2019: Bayern Munich II
- 2020–2021: Bayern Munich II
- 2022–2026: Bayern Munich II
- 2026–: SpVgg Unterhaching
- * Club domestic league appearances and goals

Holger Seitz (born 9 October 1974) is a German professional football manager and former player who works as the head coach for Regionalliga Bayern club SpVgg Unterhaching.

== Early life ==
Seitz was born in Simbach am Inn, West Germany on 9 October 1974.

== Playing career ==
Seitz came through the youth system of 1. FC Nürnberg. Then he played for 1. FC Nürnberg II, Greuther Fürth, Bayern Munich II, Karlsruher SC, Darmstadt 98, and SC Fürstenfeldbruck.

== Coaching career ==
=== Bayern Munich II ===
Seitz joined Bayern Munich's youth section as a coach in 2015 before joining Bayern Munich II in 2018.

Seitz became the manager of Bayern Munich II on 8 May 2018. Bayern Munich II started pre–season, prior to the 2018–19 Regionalliga Bayern season, with a 2–2 draw against FC Liefering on 6 July 2018. His first competitive match was a 5–1 win against VfB Eichstätt. He was replaced by Sebastian Hoeneß on 14 June 2019. He finished with a record of 23 wins, seven draws, and six losses.

Seitz returned to manage Bayern Munich II on 25 August 2020. His first competitive match since returning as manager was a 2–2 draw against Türkgücü München. Martín Demichelis and Danny Schwarz replaced Seitz as Bayern Munich II co-managers. His last match was against VfB Lübeck. Seitz returned to managing Bayern II in November 2022 as Demichelis was hired by River Plate. His first match Bayern Munich II's match was scheduled for 19 November 2022 against Türkgücü Munich. But it ended up being rescheduled with no supporters allowed in.

Seitz left Bayern Munich II after the 2025–26 season concluded, and was replaced by former Bayern Munich and Brazil footballer Dante in his debut as head coach.

=== SpVgg Unterhaching ===
On 17 September 2026, he was appointed as the head coach of fellow Regionalliga Bayern club SpVgg Unterhaching, ahead of the 2026–27 season.

== Career statistics ==
=== Playing ===
Appearances and goals by club, season and competition
Club	Season	League			Cup		Total	
Club	Season	Division	Apps	Goals	Apps	Goals	Apps	Goals
Bayern Munich II	1999–2000	Regionalliga Süd	27	1	—		27	1
Karlsruher SC	2000–01	Regionalliga Süd	31	1	3	0	34	1
Karlsruher SC	2001–02	2. Bundesliga	12	0	—		12	0
Karlsruher SC	Totals		43	1	3	0	46	1
Darmstadt 98	2002–03	Regionalliga Süd	21	1	—		21	1
SC Fürstenfeldbruck	2006–07	Oberliga Bayern	19	0	—		19	0
Career totals			110	3	3	0	113	3

=== Managerial record ===
As of match played 24 February 2024

Team	From	To	Record					Ref.
Team	From	To	M	W	D	L	Win %	Ref.
Bayern Munich II	18 May 2018	14 June 2019	36	23	7	6	63.89	
Bayern Munich II	25 August 2020	3 April 2021	30	8	9	13	26.67	
Bayern Munich II	14 November 2022	present	36	19	9	8	52.78	
Total			102	50	25	27	49.02	—
