= Markus Oberleitner =

German footballer (born 1973)

Personal information
- Date of birth: 16 August 1973 (age 53)
- Place of birth: Munich, West Germany
- Height: 1.78 m (5 ft 10 in)
- Position: Midfielder

Youth career
- TSV Ottobrunn
- TSV Brunnthal

Senior career*
Years	Team	Apps	(Gls)
1994–1996	SpVgg Unterhaching	58	(18)
1996–1997	Bayern Munich	0	(0)
1997	Fortuna Düsseldorf	13	(0)
1997–2001	SpVgg Unterhaching	111	(11)
2001	Greuther Fürth	2	(0)
2001–2003	FC Kärnten	45	(3)
Total		219	(32)
- * Club domestic league appearances and goals

Markus Oberleitner (born 16 August 1973) is a German former professional football who played as a midfielder for SpVgg Unterhaching, Fortuna Düsseldorf and Greuther Fürth in Germany and finished his career with FC Kärnten in Austria.

== Career ==
Oberleitner was born in Munich. He played as a youth for TSV Ottobrunn and TSV Brunnthal. In 1994, he signed for the then Regionalliga Süd (III) team SpVgg Unterhaching, achieving promotion to the 2. Bundesliga in his first season. In the 1995–96 season, he made 24 appearances in the second tier, scoring nine goals. The club finished in a respectable fourth place. He subsequently joined neighbours Bayern Munich.

He remained a backup player at FC Bayern, however, and didn't make a single first-team appearance, before joining Fortuna Düsseldorf during the winter-break. Here he made his Bundesliga debut, but the club were relegated, and he returned to Unterhaching at the end of the season.

In 1999, Unterhaching were promoted to the Bundesliga for the first time in their history, and for their two years at this level, Oberleitner was a key first-team player. He made 63 appearances, scoring six goals, most famously a header in a 2–0 win over Bayer Leverkusen – a result that handed the league title to his former club, Bayern Munich.

After Unterhaching's relegation in 2001, Oberleitner joined SpVgg Greuther Fürth, of the 2. Bundesliga, but only made two first-team appearances. After a year, he moved to Austria, joining FC Kärnten. He retired from the game in 2003.
