= 1997–98 Eintracht Frankfurt season =

Eintracht Frankfurt
1997-98 season
- Chairman: Rolf Heller
- Manager: Horst Ehrmantraut
- 2. Bundesliga: 1st
- DFB-Pokal: Round of 16
- Top goalscorer: League: Thomas Sobotzik (10); All: Thomas Sobotzik (13)
- Highest home attendance: 45,000 31 August 1997 v 1. FC Nürnberg (league)
- Lowest home attendance: 13,500 7 December 1997 v FSV Zwickau (league)
- Average home league attendance: 23,647
Home colours	Away colours

The 1997–98 Eintracht Frankfurt season was the 98th season in the club's football history. In 1997–98 the club played in the 2. Bundesliga, the second tier of German football. It was the club's 2nd season in the 2. Bundesliga after being relegated from the Bundesliga for the first time. The season ended for Eintracht with promotion to the Bundesliga after winning the 2. Bundesliga.

== Friendlies ==
Win Draw Loss

1 July 1997	SV Groß-Bieberau	2–9	Eintracht Frankfurt	Groß-Bieberau, Germany
19:00 CEST	Agbemanyole 9'; Krömmelbein	(Report)	Weber 11'; Amstätter; Sobotzik; Pisont; Cengiz da Silva	Stadium: Sportanlage am Sepp-Herberger-Weg; Attendance: 2,000

4 July 1997	Eintracht Frankfurt	3–0	Fenerbahçe	Frankfurt, Germany
	Güntensperger 31'; Sobotzik 41'; Cengiz 73'	(Report)		Stadium: Waldstadion; Attendance: 4,985; Referee: Merk

9 July 1997	Oberneuland XI	1–20	Eintracht Frankfurt	Ried, Austria
	Gunolf 87'	(Report)	Cengiz; Güntensperger; Sobotzik; Weber; Epp; Hubchev; Amstätter; Wolf; Zampach da Silva; Martini	Stadium: Rieder Stadion; Attendance: 500

12 July 1997	1. FC Nürnberg	1–3	Eintracht Frankfurt	Würzburg, Germany
	Šmejkal 62'	(Report)	Güntensperger 26'; Levy 74'; Cengiz 76'	Stadium: Dallenbergstadion; Attendance: 3,500

15 July 1997	EGC Wirges / Sportfreunde Eisbachtal	0–0	Eintracht Frankfurt	Nentershausen, Germany
19:00 CEST		(Report)		Stadium: Eisbachtalstadion; Attendance: 1,500; Referee: Albers

19 July 1997	FSV Frankfurt	2–0	Eintracht Frankfurt	Frankfurt, Germany
17:00 CEST	Böhnke 2'; Guht 44'	(Report)		Stadium: Stadion am Bornheimer Hang; Attendance: 2,500; Referee: Ortola

26 August 1997	SpVgg Bad Homburg	0–3	Eintracht Frankfurt	Bad Homburg, Germany
		(Report)	Cengiz 10'; Mehic 12'; Amstätter 73'	Stadium: Stadion Sandelmühle; Attendance: 1,200; Referee: Kantor
Note: Match suspended at the 84th minute due to darkness

4 September 1997	TSV Großen-Linden	0–9	Eintracht Frankfurt	Linden
18:00 CEST		(Report)	Wolf 8' da Silva 11'; Sobotzik 20', 35'; Levy 41'; Cengiz 43'; Janßen 58', 83' (pen.); Epp 80'	Stadium: Sportplatz an der Heide; Attendance: 1,000; Referee: Schön

5 September 1997	Nidderau XI	0–19	Eintracht Frankfurt	Nidderau, Germany
19:00 CEST		(Report)	Sobotzik 12', 27'; Cengiz 14', 41', 64'; Wolf 15', 88'; Schur 17'; Mehic 20', 60', 73'; Gebhardt 22', 44'; Kutschera 33'; Levy 38', 69'; Bindewald 67'; Weber 77' da Silva 80'	Stadium: Niddersportfeld; Attendance: 1,100; Referee: Chtaiti

8 October 1997	Eintracht Frankfurt	2–3	SSC Napoli	Frankfurt, Germany
20:15 CEST	Cengiz 11', 67'	(Report)	Calderón 15'; Protti 26', 87'	Stadium: Waldstadion; Attendance: 2,500

11 October 1997	TV Haßloch	0–14	Eintracht Frankfurt	Rüsselsheim, Germany
		(Report)	Cengiz; Weber; Wolf; Zampach da Silva; Levy; Kljaić (guest player); Ilie (guest player)	Attendance: 1,000

17 January 1998	Eintracht Frankfurt	12–0	Rot-Weiss Frankfurt	Frankfurt, Germany
	Sawieh; Corrochano; Mehic; Nwosu; Flick; Hubchev; Epp; Schur; Brinkmann	(Report)		Stadium: Ancillary pitch at the Waldstadion

19 January 1998	Taunus XI	0–9	Eintracht Frankfurt	Oberursel, Germany
		(Report)	Sobotzik 21', 28', 41'; Schur 43'; Sawieh 44'; Corrochano 64' da Silva 65'; Epp 72', 75'	Stadium: Sportfeld am Tannenwald; Attendance: 500

25 January 1998	Hannover 96	3–3	Eintracht Frankfurt	Belek, Turkey
	N’Diaye; Messine	(Report)	Epp; Sobotzik; Martini

29 January 1998	Spartak Varna	1–2	Eintracht Frankfurt	Belek, Turkey
	Stanchev 55'	(Report)	Nwosu 26'; Bindewald 81'

4 February 1998	SV Bernbach	1–2	Eintracht Frankfurt	Freigericht, Germany
	Diop 82'	(Report)	Epp 10'; Martini 87'	Stadium: Stadion an der Birkenhainer Straße; Attendance: 775; Referee: Wagner

8 February 1998	Eintracht Frankfurt	4–0	SC Neukirchen	Frankfurt, Germany
	Westerthaler 9', 30', 36'; Brinkmann 67'	(Report)		Stadium: Waldstadion; Attendance: 300; Referee: Bastian

12 February 1998	FV Bad Vilbel	2–2	Eintracht Frankfurt	Bad Vilbel, Germany
	Repp 20', 40'	(Report)	Güntensperger 36'; Sobotzik 76'	Stadium: Niddasportfeld; Attendance: 300

15 April 1998	SG Hoechst	2–5	Eintracht Frankfurt
	Kilić 4'; Kremer 42'	(Report)	Mehic 39'; Gusić (guest player) 44', 82'; Amstätter 67'; Levy 85'	Attendance: 400; Referee: Lekić

27 May 1998	FC Kalbach	0–17	Eintracht Frankfurt	Frankfurt, Germany
18:30 CEST		(Report)	Westerthaler; Weber; Sobotzik; Schur; Mehic; Hubchev; Epp; Brinkmann; Flick da Silva; Yang (guest player); Krolo (o.g.)	Stadium: Bezirkssportanlage Kalbach; Attendance: 2,000

8 June 1998	SV Nieder-Wöllstadt	0–17	Eintracht Frankfurt	Nieder-Wöllstadt, Germany
19:00 CEST		(Report)	Sobotzik 15', 31', 41', 44' da Silva 29', 53'; Thurk (guest player) 34', 60', 63'; Amstätter 36'; Mehic 50', 75', 80', 88'; Zampach 58', 85'; Wolf 67'	Attendance: 2,500

== Indoor soccer tournaments ==
=== Dortmund ===
3 January 1998 First match	MSV Duisburg	2–1	Eintracht Frankfurt	Dortmund, Germany
	Wolters; Hirsch	(Report)	Gebhardt	Stadium: Westfalenhalle

3 January 1998 Second match	SG Wattenscheid 09	4–4	Eintracht Frankfurt	Dortmund, Germany
	Feinbier; Majek (o.g.)	(Report)	Zampach; Martini; Wolf; Bindewald	Stadium: Westfalenhalle

3 January 1998 Third match	Borussia Dortmund	4–3	Eintracht Frankfurt	Dortmund, Germany
	Timm; Booth (o.g.)	(Report)	Martini; Zampach	Stadium: Westfalenhalle

=== Frankfurt ===
14 January 1998 First match	Eintracht Frankfurt	3–0	Borussia Fulda	Frankfurt, Germany
	Goal	(Report)		Stadium: Ballsporthalle; Attendance: 3,800

14 January 1998 Second match	Eintracht Frankfurt	2–0	SG Egelsbach	Frankfurt, Germany
	Goal	(Report)		Stadium: Ballsporthalle; Attendance: 3,800

14 January 1998 Third match	Eintracht Frankfurt	1–1	Kickers Offenbach	Frankfurt, Germany
	Martini	(Report)	Koutsoliakos	Stadium: Ballsporthalle; Attendance: 3,800

14 January 1998 Semi-Final	Eintracht Frankfurt	1–3	Mainz 05	Frankfurt, Germany
	Goal	(Report)	Goal	Stadium: Ballsporthalle; Attendance: 3,800

14 January 1998	Eintracht Frankfurt	0–0 (4–5 p)	SV Wehen	Frankfurt, Germany
		(Report)		Stadium: Ballsporthalle; Attendance: 3,800

== Competitions ==
Win Draw Loss

=== 2. Bundesliga ===
==== League table ====
Pos	Team	Pld	W	D	L	GF	GA	GD	Pts	Promotion or relegation
1	Eintracht Frankfurt (C, P)	34	17	13	4	50	32	+18	64	Promotion to Bundesliga
2	SC Freiburg (P)	34	18	7	9	57	36	+21	61	Promotion to Bundesliga
3	1. FC Nürnberg (P)	34	17	8	9	52	35	+17	59	Promotion to Bundesliga
4	FC St. Pauli	34	14	14	6	43	31	+12	56	
5	FC Gütersloh	34	13	16	5	43	26	+17	55	

Source: Bundesliga.de
Rules for classification: 1) points; 2) goal difference; 3) number of goals scored.
(C) Champions; (P) Promoted

==== Results by round ====
Round	1	2	3	4	5	6	7	8	9	10	11	12	13	14	15	16	17	18	19	20	21	22	23	24	25	26	27	28	29	30	31	32	33	34
Ground	H	A	H	A	H	A	H	A	A	H	A	H	A	H	A	H	A	H	H	A	H	A	H	A	H	H	A	H	A	H	A	H	A	H
Result	W	W	W	W	W	D	W	L	D	L	D	D	L	W	D	D	W	D	W	W	W	W	W	D	D	D	W	W	W	D	L	D	D	W
Position	5	2	1	1	1	1	1	1	1	2	2	2	4	4	4	5	2	3	3	3	2	1	1	2	2	1	1	1	1	1	1	1	1	1

Source: kicker.de
A = Away; H = Home; W = Win; D = Draw; L = Loss

==== Matches ====
25 July 1997 1	Eintracht Frankfurt	3–2	Fortuna Düsseldorf	Frankfurt, Germany
19:15 CEST	Epp 5'; Güntensperger 63' (pen.); Gebhardt 82'	(Report)	Younga-Mouhani 27'; Dobrovolski 59'; Jack (red card) 73'	Stadium: Waldstadion; Attendance: 19,000; Referee: Berg

3 August 1997 2	SG Wattenscheid 09	0–1	Eintracht Frankfurt	Bochum, Germany
15:00 CEST		(Report)	Sobotzik 28'	Stadium: Lohrheidestadion; Attendance: 6,000; Referee: Schößling

10 August 1997 3	Eintracht Frankfurt	1–0	Stuttgarter Kickers	Frankfurt, Germany
15:00 CEST	Janßen 35'	(Report)	Malchow (yellow card) 16' (yellow-red card)	Stadium: Waldstadion; Attendance: 20,000; Referee: Byernetzki

22 August 1997 4	Energie Cottbus	0–1	Eintracht Frankfurt	Cottbus, Germany
19:00 CEST		(Report)	Kutschera 21'	Stadium: Stadion der Freundschaft; Attendance: 14,000; Referee: Aust

31 August 1997 5	Eintracht Frankfurt	4–1	1. FC Nürnberg	Frankfurt, Germany
15:15 CEST	Hubchev 15'; Güntensperger 27', 75' (pen.); Weber 45'	(Report)	Wiesinger 90'	Stadium: Waldstadion; Attendance: 45,000; Referee: Hauer

12 September 1997 6	SC Freiburg	0–0	Eintracht Frankfurt	Freiburg, Germany
19:00 CEST		(Report)		Stadium: Dreisamstadion; Attendance: 22,500; Referee: Wendorf

19 September 1997 7	Eintracht Frankfurt	3–2	VfB Leipzig	Frankfurt, Germany
19:00 CEST	Weber 30', 77'; Hubchev 40'	(Report)	Heidrich 65'; Kujat 75'	Stadium: Waldstadion; Attendance: 19,000; Referee: Wack

28 September 1997 8	FC Carl Zeiss Jena	2–1	Eintracht Frankfurt	Jena, Germany
15:00 CEST	Holetschek 37'; Schneider 43'	(Report)	Sobotzik 35'	Stadium: Ernst-Abbe-Sportfeld; Attendance: 8,000; Referee: Margenberg

5 October 1997 9	FC Gütersloh	0–0	Eintracht Frankfurt	Gütersloh, Germany
15:00 CEST	Meyer (red card) 75'	(Report)	Weber (yellow card) 81' (yellow-red card)	Stadium: Heidewaldstadion; Attendance: 13,000; Referee: Hilmes

20 October 1997 10	Eintracht Frankfurt	0–1	KFC Uerdingen 05	Frankfurt, Germany
19:15 CEST		(Report)	van Buskirk 72'	Stadium: Waldstadion; Attendance: 25,000; Referee: Müller

24 October 1997 11	SV Meppen	1–1	Eintracht Frankfurt	Meppen, Germany
19:00 CEST	Ukrow 65'	(Report)	Sobotzik 53'	Stadium: Emslandstadion; Attendance: 10,500; Referee: Friedrichs

31 October 1997 12	Eintracht Frankfurt	1–1	SpVgg Unterhaching	Frankfurt, Germany
19:00 CEST	Weber 63'	(Report)	Lust 55'	Stadium: Waldstadion; Attendance: 15,500; Referee: Blumenstein

9 November 1997 13	SpVgg Greuther Fürth	2–1	Eintracht Frankfurt	Fürth, Germany
14:30 CEST	Kerbr 53'; Weigl 59'	(Report)	Sobotzik 65'	Stadium: Playmobil-Stadion; Attendance: 12,000; Referee: Malbranc

24 November 1997 14	Eintracht Frankfurt	4–2	FC St. Pauli	Frankfurt, Germany
19:15 CEST	Sobotzik 10'; Schur 16'; Weber 31' (pen.); Wolf 85'	(Report)	Marin 50'; Dammann 88'	Stadium: Waldstadion; Attendance: 14,000; Referee: Werthmann

28 November 1997 15	Mainz 05	1–1	Eintracht Frankfurt	Mainz, Germany
19:00 CEST	Tanjga 42'	(Report)	Weber 77'	Stadium: Stadion am Bruchweg; Attendance: 15,000; Referee: Gettke

7 December 1997 16	Eintracht Frankfurt	1–1	FSV Zwickau	Frankfurt, Germany
15:00 CEST	Wolf 38'	(Report)	Klee 49'	Stadium: Waldstadion; Attendance: 13,500; Referee: Fleischer

14 December 1997 17	Fortuna Köln	1–2	Eintracht Frankfurt	Cologne, Germany
15:00 CEST	Brdarić 32'; Grlić (red card) 66'	(Report)	Weber 70'; Epp 82'	Stadium: Südstadion; Attendance: 6,000; Referee: Weiner

16 February 1998 18	Fortuna Düsseldorf	0–0	Eintracht Frankfurt	Düsseldorf, Germany
19:30 CEST		(Report)		Stadium: Rheinstadion; Attendance: 12,000; Referee: Hauer

23 February 1998 19	Eintracht Frankfurt	2–1	SG Wattenscheid 09	Frankfurt, Germany
19:30 CEST	Sobotzik 3'; Epp 43'	(Report)	Süs 30' (pen.)	Stadium: Waldstadion; Attendance: 15,500; Referee: Kadach

28 February 1998 20	Stuttgarter Kickers	2–3	Eintracht Frankfurt	Stuttgart, Germany
15:30 CEST	Malchow 84'; Carl 86'	(Report)	Brinkmann 18', 89' (pen.); Westerthaler 90'	Stadium: Gottlieb-Daimler-Stadion; Attendance: 6,000; Referee: Schütz

8 March 1998 21	Eintracht Frankfurt	2–0	Energie Cottbus	Frankfurt, Germany
15:00 CEST	Wehner 28' (o.g.); 2:0 Schur 53'	(Report)		Stadium: Waldstadion; Attendance: 18,000; Referee: Neis

16 March 1998 22	1. FC Nürnberg	0–1	Eintracht Frankfurt	Nuremberg, Germany
19:30 CEST		(Report)	Epp 7'	Stadium: Frankenstadion; Attendance: 36,000; Referee: Werthmann

23 March 1998 23	Eintracht Frankfurt	2–0	SC Freiburg	Frankfurt, Germany
19:30 CEST	Sobotzik 3'; Zampach 60'	(Report)		Stadium: Waldstadion; Attendance: 36,000; Referee: Fröhlich

27 March 1998 24	VfB Leipzig	1–1	Eintracht Frankfurt	Leipzig, Germany
19:00 CEST	Heidrich 70'	(Report)	Westerthaler 2'	Stadium: Bruno-Plache-Stadion; Attendance: 9,500; Referee: Jansen

3 April 1998 25	Eintracht Frankfurt	2–2	FC Carl Zeiss Jena	Frankfurt, Germany
19:00 CEST	Güntensperger 51'; Brinkmann 52'	(Report)	Weber 25'; Schneider 35'	Stadium: Waldstadion; Attendance: 18,000; Referee: Weber

9 April 1998 26	Eintracht Frankfurt	0–0	FC Gütersloh	Frankfurt, Germany
19:00 CEST		(Report)		Stadium: Waldstadion; Attendance: 26,000; Referee: Florian Meyer

20 April 1998 27	KFC Uerdingen 05	0–1	Eintracht Frankfurt	Krefeld, Germany
19:30 CEST		(Report)	Westerthaler 79'	Stadium: Grotenburg-Stadion; Attendance: 4,500; Referee: Schößling

26 April 1998 28	Eintracht Frankfurt	1–0	SV Meppen	Frankfurt, Germany
15:00 CEST	Westerthaler 37'	(Report)		Stadium: Waldstadion; Attendance: 22,000; Referee: Margenberg

3 May 1998 29	SpVgg Unterhaching	1–2	Eintracht Frankfurt	Unterhaching, Germany
15:00 CEST	Rraklli 59' (pen.)	(Report)	Sobotzik 52'; Weber 88'	Stadium: Sportpark Unterhaching; Attendance: 4,500; Referee: Lange

10 May 1998 30	Eintracht Frankfurt	1–1	SpVgg Greuther Fürth	Frankfurt, Germany
15:00 CEST	Flick 84'	(Report)	Weigl 78'	Stadium: Waldstadion; Attendance: 21,000; Referee: Kammerer

18 May 1998 31	FC St. Pauli	2–0	Eintracht Frankfurt	Hamburg, Germany
19:30 CEST	Marin 45'; Mason 84'	(Report)		Stadium: Wilhelm-Koch-Stadion; Attendance: 16,000; Referee: Keßler

25 May 1998 32	Eintracht Frankfurt	2–2	Mainz 05	Frankfurt, Germany
19:30 CEST	Weber 10'; Westerthaler 38'	(Report)	Hock 62'; Neustädter 65'	Stadium: Waldstadion; Attendance: 33,000; Referee: Weiner

3 June 1998 33	FSV Zwickau	1–1	Eintracht Frankfurt	Zwickau, Germany
19:00 CEST	Pinder 42'	(Report)	Wolf 40'	Stadium: Westsachsenstadion; Attendance: 4,000; Referee: Frey

7 June 1998 34	Eintracht Frankfurt	4–2	Fortuna Köln	Frankfurt, Germany
15:00 CEST	Sobotzik 55', 59'; Gebhardt 70'; Bindewald 80' (pen.)	(Report)	Majstorović (yellow card) 49' (yellow-red card); Younga-Mouhani 54', 90'	Stadium: Waldstadion; Attendance: 41,500; Referee: Florian Meyer

=== DFB-Pokal ===
16 August 1997 1st Round	VfL Halle 1896	0–4	Eintracht Frankfurt	Halle, Germany
15:30 CEST		(Report)	Janßen 24'; Güntensperger 33' (pen.); Sobotzik 48' (pen.), 71'	Stadium: Stadion am Zoo; Attendance: 4,500; Referee: Wendorf

23 September 1997 2nd Round	Eintracht Frankfurt	3–0	Werder Bremen	Frankfurt, Germany
19:30 CEST	Sobotzik 19' (pen.); Janßen 36'; Weber 64'	(Report)	Schierenbeck (yellow card) 58' (yellow-red card)	Stadium: Waldstadion; Attendance: 35,086; Referee: Fandel

2 December 1997 Round of 16	MSV Duisburg	1–0	Eintracht Frankfurt	Duisburg, Germany
	Salou 83'	(Report)		Stadium: Wedaustadion; Attendance: 9,000

== Squad ==
=== Squad and statistics ===
No.	Pos	Nat	Player	Total		2. Bundesliga		DFB-Pokal	
No.	Pos	Nat	Player	Apps	Goals	Apps	Goals	Apps	Goals
1	GK	(North Macedonia) MKD	Oka Nikolov	37	0	34	0	3	0
2	MF	(Germany) GER	Sascha Amstätter	3	0	3	0	0	0
3	DF	(Germany) GER	Dirk Wolf	29	3	26	3	3	0
4	MF	(Germany) GER	Thorsten Flick	8	1	8	1	0	0
5	DF	(Bulgaria) BUL	Petar Hubchev	34	2	32	2	2	0
6	MF	(Germany) GER	Thomas Zampach	36	1	33	1	3	0
7	FW	(Germany) GER	Thomas Epp	35	4	32	4	3	0
8	DF	(Germany) GER	Ralf Weber	33	10	30	9	3	1
9	FW	(Switzerland) SUI	Urs Güntensperger	16	5	15	4	1	1
10	MF	(Germany) GER	Thomas Sobotzik	35	13	32	10	3	3
11	MF	(Germany) GER	Marco Gebhardt	34	2	31	2	3	0
13	FW	(Bosnia and Herzegovina) BIH	Sead Mehić	19	0	16	0	3	0
14	FW	(Turkey) TUR	Hakan Cengiz	12	0	11	0	1	0
16	MF	(Germany) GER	Olaf Janßen	13	3	11	1	2	2
18	DF	(Germany) GER	Alexander Kutschera	37	1	34	1	3	0
19	MF	(Brazil) BRA	Antônio da Silva	1	0	0	0	1	0
20	DF	(Germany) GER	Uwe Bindewald	37	1	34	1	3	0
21	MF	(Germany) GER	Renato Levy	7	0	6	0	1	0
22	DF	(Turkey) TUR	Burhanettin Kaymak	7	0	7	0	0	0
23	GK	(Germany) GER	Sven Schmitt	0	0	0	0	0	0
24	MF	(Germany) GER	Alexander Schur	34	2	31	2	3	0
27	MF	(Albania) ALB	Edi Martini	1	0	1	0	0	0
30	FW	(Austria) AUT	Christoph Westerthaler	16	5	16	5	0	0
31	MF	(Germany) GER	Alexander Lorenz	2	0	1	0	1	0
32	MF	(Germany) GER	Ansgar Brinkmann	17	3	17	3	0	0
33	FW	(Liberia) LBR	Jonathan Sawieh	7	0	7	0	0	0

=== Transfers ===
==== Summer ====
In:

No.	Pos.	Nation	Player
2	MF	GER	Sascha Amstätter (from FSV Frankfurt)
3	MF	GER	Dirk Wolf (from Borussia Mönchengladbach)
6	MF	GER	Thomas Zampach (from SV Wehen)
7	MF	GER	Thomas Epp (from Waldhof Mannheim)
10	MF	GER	Thomas Sobotzik (from FC St. Pauli)
11	MF	GER	Marco Gebhardt (from SC Verl)
13	MF	BIH	Sead Mehić (from KSV Klein-Karben)
14	MF	TUR	Hakan Cengiz (from VfL Herzlake)
15	MF	ALB	Adrian Dashi (from KF Lushnja)
19	MF	BRA	Antônio da Silva (to Sportfreunde Eisbachtal)
21	MF	GER	Renato Levy (from FSV Frankfurt)
22	DF	TUR	Burhanettin Kaymak (from Eintracht Frankfurt II)
27	MF	ALB	Edi Martini (from Vllaznia Shkodër)
31	MF	GER	Alexander Lorenz (from Eintracht Frankfurt II)
32	MF	GER	Ansgar Brinkmann (from BV Cloppenburg)
33	MF	LBR	Jonathan Sawieh (from Waldhof Mannheim)

Out:

No.	Pos.	Nation	Player
4	DF	GER	Dietmar Roth (to FSV Frankfurt)
6	DF	GER	Mirko Dickhaut (to VfL Bochum)
7	MF	GER	Matthias Becker (to VfB Stuttgart)
8	MF	GER	Rudi Bommer (retired)
10	MF	GER	Maurizio Gaudino (to FC Basel)
11	FW	SWE	Johnny Ekström (to IFK Göteborg)
12	MF	GER	René Beuchel (to FSV Zwickau)
14	DF	ITA	Marco Rossi (to Piacenza FC)
19	MF	GER	Michael König (to SV Wehen)
20	DF	YUG	Zvezdan Pejović (to unknown)
21	MF	YUG	Slobodan Komljenović (to MSV Duisburg)
27	MF	GER	Carsten Hennig (to FSV Frankfurt)
31	MF	GER	Michael Guht (to FSV Frankfurt)
32	MF	GER	Patrick Glöckner (loaned to Stuttgarter Kickers)

==== Winter ====
In:

No.	Pos.	Nation	Player
30	MF	AUT	Christoph Westerthaler (from APOEL)

Out:

No.	Pos.	Nation	Player
14	FW	TUR	Hakan Cengiz (to Waldhof Mannheim)

== Sources ==
- Matheja, Ulrich (2011). Unsere Eintracht - Eintracht Frankfurt - Die Chronik. Die Werkstatt. ISBN 978-3-89533-750-5.
