= 1991–92 UEFA Cup =

21st season of Europe's secondary club football tournament organised by UEFA

Tournament details
- Dates: 18 September 1991 – 13 May 1992
- Teams: 64

Final positions
- Champions: (Netherlands) Ajax (1st title)
- Runners-up: (Italy) Torino

Tournament statistics
- Matches played: 126
- Goals scored: 304 (2.41 per match)
- Attendance: 1,968,035 (15,619 per match)
- Top scorer(s): Dean Saunders (Liverpool); 9 goals

The 1991–92 UEFA Cup was the 21st season of Europe's then-tertiary club football tournament organised by UEFA. The final was played over two legs at Stadio Delle Alpi, Turin, Italy, and at Olympisch Stadion, Amsterdam, Netherlands. The competition was won by Dutch club Ajax, who defeated Torino of Italy on away goals after an aggregate result of 2–2 to claim their first UEFA Cup title.

The victory made Ajax only the second team—after Torino's city rivals Juventus—to have won all three major European trophies at the time (European Cup/UEFA Champions League, UEFA Cup/UEFA Europa League, and the Cup Winners' Cup). As the only English team in the tournament due to lost coeffecient following the five-year ban for the Heysel disaster during the 1985 European Cup final, and being given an additional year of exclusion, Liverpool made their comeback in continental competition for the first time since then.

== Association team allocation ==
A total of 64 teams from 32 UEFA member associations participated in the 1991–92 UEFA Cup, all entering from the first round over six knock-out rounds. The association ranking based on the UEFA country coefficients is used to determine the number of participating teams for each association:

- Associations 1–3 each have four teams qualify.
- Associations 4–8 each have three teams qualify.
- Associations 9–21 each have two teams qualify.
- Associations 22–32 each have one team qualify.

=== Association ranking ===
For the 1991–92 UEFA Cup, the associations are allocated places according to their 1990 UEFA country coefficients, which takes into account their performance in European competitions from 1985–86 to 1989–90. Despite returning to European competitions the previous season, England's five-year ban was served during the period reflected in the ranking and had no score, so only one English club competed in the UEFA Cup.

Association ranking for 1991-92 UEFA Cup

Rank	Association	Coeff.	Teams	Notes
1	Germany	45.427	4	
2	Italy	43.212	4	
3	Spain	42.666	4	
4	Belgium	36.233	3	
5	Portugal	28.633	3	
6	France	28.100	3	
7	Soviet Union	26.966	3	
8	Netherlands	26.500	3	
9	Romania	26.300	2	
10	Scotland	24.800	2	
11	Sweden	22.600	2	
12	Austria	20.500	2	
13	Yugoslavia	19.950	2	
14	East Germany	19.250	2	
15	Switzerland	16.750	2	
16	Czechoslovakia	15.750	2	
17	Finland	14.581	2	

Rank	Association	Coeff.	Teams	Notes
-	Wales	14.000	0	
18	Denmark	13.998	2	
19	Bulgaria	12.749	2	
20	Greece	12.250	2	
21	Hungary	12.250	2	
21	Poland	11.000	1	
23	Turkey	10.998	1	
24	Albania	10.666	1	
25	Norway	5.999	1	
26	Cyprus	5.666	1	
27	Northern Ireland	4.333	1	
28	Iceland	4.000	1	
29	Malta	1.999	1	
30	Luxembourg	1.332	1	
31	Republic of Ireland	0.999	1	
32	England	0.000	1	

Wales: There was no national league in Wales before 1992 and the only competition organised by the Football Association of Wales was the Welsh Cup so Wales had just a single participant in European competitions, the winner (or best placed Welsh team as several English teams also competed) of the Welsh Cup which competed in the UEFA Cup Winners' Cup. Its virtual ranking is only an original research, because the UEFA country ranking was only used to allocate the UEFA Cup spots at time, so Wales was not included.
Germany: Due to the reunification of Germany in October 1990, all flags show Germany instead of the former West/East Germany. However, the original slot allocation still applied, and matches and records for NOFV-Oberliga representatives were still counted for East Germany.

=== Teams ===
The labels in parentheses show how each team qualified for competition:

- TH: Title holders
- CW: Cup winners
- CR: Cup runners-up
- LC: League Cup winners
- 2nd, 3rd, 4th, 5th, 6th, etc.: League position
- P-W: End-of-season European competition play-offs winners

Qualified teams for 1991–92 UEFA Cup
(Germany) Bayern Munich (2nd)	(Germany) Eintracht Frankfurt (4th)	(Germany) Hamburg (5th)	(Germany) Stuttgart (6th)
(Italy) Internazionale (3rd)^{TH}	(Italy) Genoa (4th)	(Italy) Torino (5th)	(Italy) Parma (6th)
(Spain) Real Madrid (3rd)	(Spain) Osasuna (4th)	(Spain) Sporting Gijón (5th)	(Spain) Oviedo (6th)
(Belgium) Mechelen (2nd)	(Belgium) Gent (3rd)	(Belgium) Germinal Ekeren (5th)	(Portugal) Sporting CP (3rd)
(Portugal) Boavista (4th)	(Portugal) Salgueiros (5th)	(France) Auxerre (3rd)	(France) Cannes (4th)
(France) Lyon (5th)	(Soviet Union) Dynamo Moscow (3rd)	(Soviet Union) Torpedo Moscow (4th)	(Soviet Union) Spartak Moscow (5th)
(Netherlands) Ajax (2nd)	(Netherlands) Groningen (3rd)	(Netherlands) Utrecht (4th)	(Romania) Steaua București (2nd)
(Romania) Dinamo București (3rd)	(Scotland) Aberdeen (2nd)	(Scotland) Celtic (3rd)	(Sweden) Örebro (3rd)
(Sweden) Östers (4th)	(Socialist Federal Republic of Yugoslavia) HAŠK Građanski (2nd)	(Socialist Federal Republic of Yugoslavia) Partizan (3rd)	(Austria) Swarovski Tirol (2nd)
(Austria) Sturm Graz (3rd)	(Germany) Rot-Weiß Erfurt (3rd)	(Germany) Hallescher FC (4th)	(Switzerland) Neuchâtel Xamax (3rd)
(Switzerland) Lausanne (4th)	(Czechoslovakia) Slovan Bratislava (2nd)	(Czechoslovakia) Sigma Olomouc (3rd)	(Finland) Kuusysi Lahti (2nd)
(Finland) MP (3rd)	(Denmark) B 1903 (2nd)	(Denmark) Ikast (3rd)	(Bulgaria) CSKA Sofia (2nd)
(Bulgaria) Slavia Sofia (3rd)	(Greece) AEK Athens (3rd)	(Greece) PAOK (4th)	(Hungary) Pécsi Munkás (3rd)
(Hungary) Váci Izzó (4th)	(Poland) Górnik Zabrze (2nd)	(Turkey) Trabzonspor (3rd)	(Albania) Vllaznia Shkodër (3rd)
(Norway) Tromsø (2nd)	(Cyprus) Anorthosis Famagusta (2nd)	(Northern Ireland) Bangor (2nd)	(Iceland) KR (2nd)
(Malta) Floriana (3rd)	Spora Luxembourg (3rd)	(Republic of Ireland) Cork City (2nd)	(England) Liverpool (2nd)

Notes

1. Italy: Milan finished second in the 1990–91 Serie A, but in March 1991, UEFA imposed them a one-year ban from European competition, due to refusing to resume their 1990–91 European Cup quarterfinal match away versus Olympique Marseille after a floodlight failure. Parma, the next best team not already qualified for European competition, took its place in the UEFA Cup.
2. Germany: Dynamo Dresden finished second in the 1990–91 NOFV-Oberliga, but the team was imposed a two-year ban from European competition by UEFA, due to fan rioting during their 1990–91 European Cup quarterfinal match home versus Red Star Belgrade. Hallescher FC, the next best team not already qualified for European competition, took its place in the UEFA Cup. Due to the reunification of Germany in October 1990, all flags show Germany instead of West/East Germany. However, all matches and records from both Rot-Weiß Erfurt and Hallescher were still counted for East Germany, and not for Germany, under UEFA regulations.
3. Greece: Olympiacos finished second in the 1990–91 Alpha Ethniki, but UEFA imposed them a one-year ban from European competition, due to crowd incidents during their 1990–91 European Cup Winners' Cup second round home match versus Sampdoria after the match concluded. PAOK, the next best team not already qualified for European competition, took its place in the UEFA Cup.

== Schedule ==
The schedule of the competition was as follows. Matches were scheduled primarily for Wednesdays, though some matches took place on Tuesdays or Thursdays.

Schedule for 1991–92 UEFA Cup
Round	First leg	Second leg
First round	17–19 September 1991	1–3 October 1991
Second round	22–24 October 1991	5–7 November 1991
Third round	27 November 1991	10–12 December 1991
Quarter-finals	4 March 1992	18–19 March 1992
Semi-finals	1 April 1992	15 April 1992
Final	29 April 1992	13 May 1992

== First round ==
Team 1	Agg.	Team 2	1st leg	2nd leg
Aberdeen (Scotland)	0–3	(Denmark) B 1903	0–1	0–2
Ajax (Netherlands)	4–0	(Sweden) Örebro SK	3–0^{1}	1–0
Anorthosis Famagusta (Cyprus)	3–4	(Romania) Steaua București	1–2	2–2 (a.e.t.)
Bangor (Northern Ireland)	0–6	(Czechoslovakia) Sigma Olomouc	0–3	0–3
Boavista (Portugal)	2–1	(Italy) Internazionale	2–1	0–0
Celtic (Scotland)	3–1	(Belgium) Germinal Ekeren	2–0	1–1
Cork City (Republic of Ireland)	1–3	(Germany) Bayern Munich	1–1	0–2
HAŠK Građanski (Socialist Federal Republic of Yugoslavia)	3–4	(Turkey) Trabzonspor	2–3^{2}	1–1
Eintracht Frankfurt (Germany)	11–1	Spora Luxembourg	6–1	5–0
Groningen (Netherlands)	0–2	(Germany) Rot-Weiß Erfurt	0–1	0–1
Ikast (Denmark)	1–6	(France) Auxerre	0–1	1–5
Swarovski Tirol (Austria)	3–2	(Norway) Tromsø	2–1	1–1
Hallescher FC (Germany)	2–4	(Soviet Union) Torpedo Moscow	2–1	0–3
Hamburg (Germany)	4–1	(Poland) Górnik Zabrze	1–1	3–0
Gent (Belgium)	1–1 (4–3 p)	(Switzerland) Lausanne	0–1	1–0 (a.e.t.)
KR (Iceland)	1–8	(Italy) Torino	0–2	1–6
Vllaznia Shkodër (Albania)	0–3	(Greece) AEK Athens	0–1	0–2
Liverpool (England)	6–2	(Finland) Kuusysi Lahti	6–1	0–1
MP (Finland)	1–5	(Soviet Union) Spartak Moscow	0–2	1–3
Neuchâtel Xamax (Switzerland)	2–0	(Malta) Floriana	2–0	0–0
Lyon (France)	2–1	(Sweden) Östers IF	1–0	1–1
PAOK (Greece)	2–1	(Belgium) Mechelen	1–1	1–0
CSKA Sofia (Bulgaria)	1–1 (a)	(Italy) Parma	0–0	1–1
Slavia Sofia (Bulgaria)	1–4	(Spain) Osasuna	1–0	0–4
Oviedo (Spain)	2–3	(Italy) Genoa	1–0	1–3
Salgueiros (Portugal)	1–1 (2–4 p)	(France) Cannes	1–0	0–1 (a.e.t.)
Slovan Bratislava (Czechoslovakia)	2–3	(Spain) Real Madrid	1–2	1–1
Sturm Graz (Austria)	1–4	(Netherlands) Utrecht	0–1	1–3
Sporting CP (Portugal)	1–2	(Romania) Dinamo București	1–0	0–2 (a.e.t.)
Sporting Gijón (Spain)	2–2 (3–2 p)	(Socialist Federal Republic of Yugoslavia) Partizan	2–0	0–2 (a.e.t.)^{3}
Váci Izzó MTE (Hungary)	2–4	(Soviet Union) Dynamo Moscow	1–0	1–4
Stuttgart (Germany)	6–3	(Hungary) Pécsi Munkás	4–1	2–2

^{1} This match was played in Düsseldorf, Germany due to hooliganism in a previous match. ^{2} This match was played in Klagenfurt, Austria due to the outbreak of the Croatian War of Independence. ^{3} This match was played in Istanbul, Turkey due to the deteriorating security situation in Yugoslavia that eventually turned into the Yugoslav Wars.

=== First leg ===
17 September 1991
19:30

Anorthosis Famagusta (Cyprus)	1–2	(Romania) Steaua București
Obiku 70' (pen.)	Report	Stan 44'; Dumitrescu 47'

Antonis Papadopoulos Stadium, Larnaca
Attendance: 6,797
Referee: Roman Steindl (Austria)

17 September 1991
17:00

HAŠK Građanski (Socialist Federal Republic of Yugoslavia)	2–3	(Turkey) Trabzonspor
Petrović 62' (pen.), 84' (pen.)	Report	Cyzio 20'; Mandıralı 35'; Karaman 57'

Wörtherseestadion, Klagenfurt
Attendance: 1,807
Referee: Joël Quiniou (France)

Match was played in Austria due to the outbreak of the Croatian War of Independence.

17 September 1991
18:00

Ikast (Denmark)	0–1	(France) Auxerre
	Report	Vahirua 67'

Ikast Stadion, Ikast
Attendance: 2,032
Referee: Valeri Butenko (Soviet Union)

17 September 1991
18:00

Hamburg (Germany)	1–1	(Poland) Górnik Zabrze
Eckel 79'	Report	Jegor 48'

Volksparkstadion, Hamburg
Attendance: 5,800
Referee: Lajos Hartmann (Hungary)

17 September 1991
20:00

Gent (Belgium)	0–1	(Switzerland) Lausanne
	Report	Cina 41'

Jules Ottenstadion, Ghent
Attendance: 5,900
Referee: Keith Cooper (Wales)

17 September 1991
20:15

Neuchâtel Xamax (Switzerland)	2–0	(Malta) Floriana
Mottiez 43'; I. Hassan 58'	Report

Stade de la Maladière, Neuchâtel
Attendance: 4,200
Referee: René Bindels (Luxembourg)

17 September 1991
21:00

Slavia Sofia (Bulgaria)	1–0	(Spain) Osasuna
Dermendzhiev 52'	Report

Vasil Levski National Stadium, Sofia
Attendance: 1,836
Referee: Zoran Petrović (Yugoslavia)

18 September 1991
20:30

Aberdeen (Scotland)	0–1	(Denmark) B 1903
	Report	Kaus 85'

Pittodrie Stadium, Aberdeen
Attendance: 13,295
Referee: Vojtech Christov (Czechoslovakia)

18 September 1991
20:00

Ajax (Netherlands)	3–0	(Sweden) Örebro SK
Bergkamp 59'; Winter 68'; Pettersson 84'	Report

Rheinstadion, Düsseldorf
Attendance: 17,000
Referee: Gerhard Kapl (Austria)

Because of hooliganism in a previous match, Ajax was ordered to play this match at least 200 km away from Amsterdam.

18 September 1991
18:00

Bangor (Northern Ireland)	0–3	(Czechoslovakia) Sigma Olomouc
	Report	Šindelář 32', 47'; Kerbr 50'

Clandeboye Park, Bangor
Attendance: 2,500
Referee: Hans-Jürgen Weber (Germany)

18 September 1991
22:30

Boavista (Portugal)	2–1	(Italy) Internazionale
Brandão 38'; Barny 57'	Report	Fontolan 67'

Estádio do Bessa, Porto
Attendance: 5,989
Referee: Lajos Németh (Hungary)

18 September 1991
20:30

Celtic (Scotland)	2–0	(Belgium) Germinal Ekeren
Nicholas 15' (pen.), 39'	Report

Celtic Park, Glasgow
Attendance: 27,410
Referee: Michel Girard (France)

18 September 1991
15:30

Cork City (Republic of Ireland)	1–1	(Germany) Bayern Munich
Barry 27'	Report	Effenberg 43'

Musgrave Park, Cork
Attendance: 2,800
Referee: Rémi Harrel (France)

18 September 1991
20:00

Eintracht Frankfurt (Germany)	6–1	Spora Luxembourg
Möller 9', 36'; Bein 14'; Gründel 32'; Yeboah 46', 54'	Report	Rigaud 39'

Waldstadion, Frankfurt am Main
Attendance: 4,808
Referee: Charles Agius (Malta)

18 September 1991
20:00

Groningen (Netherlands)	0–1	(Germany) Rot-Weiß Erfurt
	Report	Schmidt 2'

Stadion Oosterpark, Groningen
Attendance: 13,754
Referee: Howard King (Wales)

18 September 1991
19:30

Swarovski Tirol (Austria)	2–1	(Norway) Tromsø
Hörtnagl 51'; Gorosito 55'	Report	Berg Johansen 1'

Tivoli-Stadion, Innsbruck
Attendance: 4,900
Referee: Mircea Salomir (Romania)

18 September 1991
20:00

Hallescher FC (Germany)	2–1	(Soviet Union) Torpedo Moscow
Wüllbier 60'; Schülbe 64'	Report	G. Grishin 75'

Kurt-Wabbel-Stadion, Halle
Attendance: 3,700
Referee: Dušan Krchňák (Czechoslovakia)

18 September 1991
16:30

Vllaznia Shkodër (Albania)	0–1	(Greece) AEK Athens
	Report	Dimitriadis 4'

Loro Boriçi Stadium, Shkodër
Attendance: 6,000
Referee: Frans Van Den Wijngaert (Belgium)

18 September 1991
20:10

Liverpool (England)	6–1	(Finland) Kuusysi Lahti
Saunders 12', 77', 85', 86'; Houghton 33', 90'	Report	Lehtinen 35'

Anfield, Liverpool
Attendance: 17,131
Referee: Manfred Schlup (Switzerland)

18 September 1991
18:00

MP (Finland)	0–2	(Soviet Union) Spartak Moscow
	Report	Cherenkov 35'; Allen 77' (o.g.)

Mikkelin urheilupuisto, Mikkeli
Attendance: 4,316
Referee: Douglas Hope (Scotland)

18 September 1991
20:00

Lyon (France)	1–0	(Sweden) Östers IF
Garde 18'	Report

Stade de Gerland, Lyon
Attendance: 10,274
Referee: Frans Houben (Netherlands)

18 September 1991
19:30

PAOK (Greece)	1–1	(Belgium) Mechelen
Skartados 38'	Report	Ingesson 62'

Toumba Stadium, Thessaloniki
Attendance: 17,000
Referee: Peter Mikkelsen (Denmark)

18 September 1991
19:00

Slovan Bratislava (Czechoslovakia)	1–2	(Spain) Real Madrid
Dubovský 69'	Report	Míchel 13' (pen.); Butragueño 79'

Tehelné pole, Bratislava
Attendance: 20,447
Referee: Brian McGinlay (Scotland)

18 September 1991
19:30

Sturm Graz (Austria)	0–1	(Netherlands) Utrecht
	Report	Smolarek 76' (pen.)

Bundesstadion Liebenau, Graz
Attendance: 9,220
Referee: Arcangelo Pezzella (Italy)

18 September 1991
22:00

Sporting CP (Portugal)	1–0	(Romania) Dinamo București
Yordanov 76'	Report

Estádio José Alvalade, Lisbon
Attendance: 40,000
Referee: Michel Piraux (Belgium)

18 September 1991
20:45

Sporting Gijón (Spain)	2–0	(Socialist Federal Republic of Yugoslavia) Partizan
Monchu 64'; Luhový 78'	Report

El Molinón, Gijón
Attendance: 23,600
Referee: John Blankenstein (Netherlands)

18 September 1991
15:00

Váci Izzó MTE (Hungary)	1–0	(Soviet Union) Dynamo Moscow
Hahn 61'	Report

Vác Városi Stadion, Vác
Attendance: 3,200
Referee: Vassilios Nikakis (Greece)

18 September 1991
20:15

Stuttgart (Germany)	4–1	(Hungary) Pécsi Munkás
Sammer 20'; Walter 32', 39'; Buchwald 35'	Report	Balog 90'

Neckarstadion, Stuttgart
Attendance: 7,800
Referee: Zbigniew Przesmycki (Poland)

19 September 1991
19:30

KR (Iceland)	0–2	(Italy) Torino
	Report	Mussi 21'; Annoni 73'

Laugardalsvöllur, Reykjavík
Attendance: 1,793
Referee: Frederick McKnight (Northern Ireland)

19 September 1991
19:30

CSKA Sofia (Bulgaria)	0–0	(Italy) Parma
	Report

Stadion Balgarska Armia, Sofia
Attendance: 10,700
Referee: Ray Lewis (England)

19 September 1991
20:30

Oviedo (Spain)	1–0	(Italy) Genoa
Bango 44'	Report

Estadio Carlos Tartiere, Oviedo
Attendance: 16,166
Referee: Erik Fredriksson (Sweden)

19 September 1991
20:30

Salgueiros (Portugal)	1–0	(France) Cannes
Plácido 50'	Report

Estádio do Bessa, Porto
Attendance: 2,000
Referee: Leslie Irvine (Northern Ireland)

Match played at Estádio do Bessa instead of their regular stadium Estádio Engenheiro Vidal Pinheiro.

=== Second leg ===
1 October 1991
18:00

Steaua București (Romania)	2–2 (a.e.t.)	(Cyprus) Anorthosis Famagusta
Stan 63', 105'	Report	Obiku 52'; Ketsbaia 85'

Stadionul Steaua, Bucharest
Attendance: 6,244
Referee: Piotr Werner (Poland)

Steaua București won 4–3 on aggregate.

1 October 1991
20:00

Germinal Ekeren (Belgium)	1–1	(Scotland) Celtic
Schmöller 41'	Report	Galloway 10'

Veltwijckpark, Antwerp
Attendance: 6,979
Referee: Joaquín Ramos Marcos (Spain)

Celtic won 3–1 on aggregate.

1 October 1991
20:15

Bayern Munich (Germany)	2–0	(Republic of Ireland) Cork City
Labbadia 75'; Ziege 89' (pen.)	Report

Olympiastadion, Munich
Attendance: 13,500
Referee: Stavros Zakestidis (Greece)

Bayern Munich won 3–1 on aggregate.

1 October 1991
20:00

Spora Luxembourg	0–5	(Germany) Eintracht Frankfurt
	Report	Kruse 33', 59'; Weber 44'; Schmitt 71'; Bein 90'

Stade Municipal, Luxembourg
Attendance: 1,076
Referee: Oli Olsen (Iceland)

Eintracht Frankfurt won 11–1 on aggregate.

1 October 1991
15:00

Torpedo Moscow (Soviet Union)	3–0	(Germany) Hallescher FC
Agashkov 4' (pen.); Chugainov 12'; Tishkov 90'	Report

Torpedo Stadium, Moscow
Attendance: 9,800
Referee: Kim Milton Nielsen (Denmark)

Torpedo Moscow won 4–2 on aggregate.

1 October 1991
15:15

Floriana (Malta)	0–0	(Switzerland) Neuchâtel Xamax
	Report

National Stadium, Ta' Qali
Attendance: 1,345
Referee: Fabio Baldas (Italy)

Neuchâtel Xamax won 2–0 on aggregate.

1 October 1991
21:00

Real Madrid (Spain)	1–1	(Czechoslovakia) Slovan Bratislava
Alfonso 42'	Report	Lancz 90'

Santiago Bernabéu, Madrid
Attendance: 25,000
Referee: Hans-Peter Dellwing (Germany)

Real Madrid won 3–2 on aggregate.

2 October 1991
19:00

B 1903 (Denmark)	2–0	(Scotland) Aberdeen
Mi. Johansen 57'; Juul Jensen 87'	Report

Gentofte Stadion, Gentofte
Attendance: 5,237
Referee: Friedrich Kaupe (Austria)

B 1903 won 3–0 on aggregate.

2 October 1991
19:00

Örebro SK (Sweden)	0–1	(Netherlands) Ajax
	Report	Winter 63'

Eyravallen, Örebro
Attendance: 5,561
Referee: David Syme (Scotland)

Ajax won 4–0 on aggregate.

2 October 1991
15:00

Sigma Olomouc (Czechoslovakia)	3–0	(Northern Ireland) Bangor
Látal 22'; Kerbr 66'; Gottwald 69'	Report

Stadion Míru, Olomouc
Attendance: 4,445
Referee: Adrian Porumboiu (Romania)

Sigma Olomouc won 6–0 on aggregate.

2 October 1991
20:30

Internazionale (Italy)	0–0	(Portugal) Boavista
	Report

San Siro, Milan
Attendance: 38,261
Referee: Allan Gunn (England)

Boavista won 2–1 on aggregate.

2 October 1991
11:30

Trabzonspor (Turkey)	1–1	(Socialist Federal Republic of Yugoslavia) HAŠK Građanski
Aslan 65'	Report	Petrović 43'

Hüseyin Avni Aker Stadium, Trabzon
Attendance: 12,000
Referee: Keith Hackett (England)

Trabzonspor won 4–3 on aggregate.

2 October 1991
17:00

Rot-Weiß Erfurt (Germany)	1–0	(Netherlands) Groningen
Gottlöber 80'	Report

Steigerwaldstadion, Erfurt
Attendance: 3,500
Referee: Kaj Natri (Finland)

Rot-Weiß Erfurt won 2–0 on aggregate.

2 October 1991
20:45

Auxerre (France)	5–1	(Denmark) Ikast
Vahirua 19'; Ferreri 23', 55'; Cocard 72'; Kovács 82'	Report	O. Hansen 83'

Stade de l'Abbé-Deschamps, Auxerre
Attendance: 5,583
Referee: Jorge Coroado (Portugal)

Auxerre won 6–1 on aggregate.

2 October 1991
14:00

Tromsø (Norway)	1–1	(Austria) Swarovski Tirol
B. Johansen 39'	Report	Westerthaler 9'

Alfheim Stadion, Tromsø
Attendance: 6,184
Referee: George Smith (Scotland)

Swarovski Tirol won 3–2 on aggregate.

2 October 1991
17:30

Górnik Zabrze (Poland)	0–3	(Germany) Hamburg
	Report	von Heesen 60', 79'; Spörl 82'

Stadion Górnika, Zabrze
Attendance: 12,000
Referee: Emilio Soriano Aladrén (Spain)

Hamburg won 4–1 on aggregate.

2 October 1991
20:00

Lausanne (Switzerland)	0–1 (a.e.t.)	(Belgium) Gent
	Report	Verkuijl 46'
Penalties
Verlaat (penalty missed); Cina (penalty missed); Gigon (penalty scored)	1–4	(penalty scored) Viscaal; (penalty scored) Vandenbergh; (penalty scored) Van Der Linden; (penalty scored) De Roover

Stade olympique de la Pontaise, Lausanne
Attendance: 13,100
Referee: Joaquín Urío Velázquez (Spain)

1–1 on aggregate. Gent won 4–1 on penalties.

2 October 1991
20:30

Torino (Italy)	6–1	(Iceland) KR
Bresciani 15'; Policano 45'; Martín Vázquez 47'; Scifo 51', 63'; Carillo 53'	Report	Skúlason 16'

Stadio delle Alpi, Turin
Attendance: 13,081
Referee: Dušan Colić (Yugoslavia)

Torino won 8–1 on aggregate.

2 October 1991
17:00

Kuusysi Lahti (Finland)	1–0	(England) Liverpool
Belfield 66'	Report

Lahden kisapuisto, Lahti
Attendance: 8,435
Referee: Karel Hycl (Czechoslovakia)

Liverpool won 6–2 on aggregate.

2 October 1991
20:00

Mechelen (Belgium)	0–1	(Greece) PAOK
	Report	Borbokis 86'

Achter de Kazerne, Mechelen
Attendance: 8,500
Referee: José Rosa dos Santos (Portugal)

PAOK won 2–1 on aggregate.

2 October 1991
18:15

Parma (Italy)	1–1	(Bulgaria) CSKA Sofia
Agostini 72'	Report	Parushev 89'

Stadio Ennio Tardini, Parma
Attendance: 19,935
Referee: Guy Goethals (Belgium)

1–1 on aggregate. CSKA Sofia won on away goals.

2 October 1991
19:00

Osasuna (Spain)	4–0	(Bulgaria) Slavia Sofia
Cholo 20'; Bustingorri 22', 78'; Sola 68'	Report

Estadio El Sadar, Pamplona
Attendance: 8,500
Referee: Rune Larsson (Sweden)

Osasuna won 4–1 on aggregate.

2 October 1991
19:30

Utrecht (Netherlands)	3–1	(Austria) Sturm Graz
de Kruyff 56'; Smolarek 66' van der Net 89'	Report	Deverić 74'

Stadion Nieuw Galgenwaard, Utrecht
Attendance: 16,500
Referee: Alain Delmer (France)

Utrecht won 4-1 on aggregate.

2 October 1991
13:30

Dinamo București (Romania)	2–0 (a.e.t.)	(Portugal) Sporting CP
Gerstenmájer 30', 115'	Report

Stadionul Dinamo, Bucharest
Attendance: 5,400
Referee: Bo Karlsson (Sweden)

Dinamo București won 2–1 on aggregate.

2 October 1991
17:00

Dynamo Moscow (Soviet Union)	4–1	(Hungary) Váci Izzó MTE
Kobelev 8' (pen.); Kiryakov 31'; Kolyvanov 49', 52'	Report	Romanek 25'

Central Dynamo Stadium, Moscow
Attendance: 4,300
Referee: Borislav Aleksandrov (Bulgaria)

Dynamo Moscow won 4–2 on aggregate.

2 October 1991
13:30

Pécsi Munkás (Hungary)	2–2	(Germany) Stuttgart
Magyar 18'; Mörtel 84'	Report	Strehmel 55'; Mayer 75'

Stadion PMFC, Pécs
Attendance: 3,600
Referee: Arcangelo Pezzella (Italy)

Stuttgart won 6–3 on aggregate.

3 October 1991
20:00

AEK Athens (Greece)	2–0	(Albania) Vllaznia Shkodër
Papaioannou 8'; Batista 89'	Report

Nikos Goumas Stadium, Athens
Attendance: 13,519
Referee: Ray Lewis (England)

AEK won 3–0 on aggregate.

3 October 1991
17:00

Spartak Moscow (Soviet Union)	3–1	(Finland) MP
Mostovoi 27'; Karpin 57'; Radchenko 77'	Report	Hämäläinen 35'

Central Lenin Stadium, Moscow
Attendance: 9,000
Referee: Gheorghe Ionescu (Romania)

Spartak Moscow won 5–1 on aggregate.

3 October 1991
17:30

Östers IF (Sweden)	1–1	(France) Lyon
Ja. Jansson 14'	Report	Roche 54'

Värendsvallen, Växjö
Attendance: 4,628
Referee: Joe Worrall (England)

Lyon won 2–1 on aggregate.

3 October 1991
20:30

Genoa (Italy)	3–1	(Spain) Oviedo
Skuhravý 20', 89'; Caricola 72'	Report	Carlos 37'

Stadio Luigi Ferraris, Genoa
Attendance: 38,079
Referee: Aron Schmidhuber (Germany)

Genoa won 3–2 on aggregate.

3 October 1991
20:45

Cannes (France)	1–0 (a.e.t.)	(Portugal) Salgueiros
Omam-Biyik 85'	Report
Penalties
Asanović (penalty scored); Koot (penalty scored); Omam-Biyik (penalty scored); Durix (penalty scored)	4–2	(penalty scored) Duarte; (penalty scored) Rui França; (penalty missed) Plácido; (penalty missed) Rui Alberto

Stade Pierre de Coubertin, Cannes
Attendance: 5,000
Referee: Raúl García de Loza (Spain)

1–1 on aggregate. Cannes won 4–2 on penalties.

3 October 1991
17:00

Partizan (Socialist Federal Republic of Yugoslavia)	2–0 (a.e.t.)	(Spain) Sporting Gijón
Mijatović 86'; Krčmarević 88'	Report
Penalties
Mijatović (penalty missed); Krčmarević (penalty scored); Zahovič (penalty scored); Gudelj (penalty missed); Novak (penalty missed)	2–3	(penalty scored) Avelino; (penalty scored) Joaquín; (penalty scored) Arturo; (penalty missed) Luhový

İnönü Stadium, Istanbul
Attendance: 1,189
Referee: Tullio Lanese (Italy)

2–2 on aggregate. Sporting Gijón won 3–2 on penalties. Match was played in Turkey due to the deteriorating security situation in Yugoslavia that eventually turned into the Yugoslav Wars.

== Second round ==
Team 1	Agg.	Team 2	1st leg	2nd leg
Auxerre (France)	2–3	(England) Liverpool	2–0	0–3
Cannes (France)	1–2	(Soviet Union) Dynamo Moscow	0–1	1–1
B 1903 (Denmark)	6–3	(Germany) Bayern Munich	6–2	0–1
Osasuna (Spain)	3–2	(Germany) Stuttgart	0–0	3–2
Utrecht (Netherlands)	1–4	(Spain) Real Madrid	1–3	0–1
Rot-Weiss Erfurt (Germany)	1–5	(Netherlands) Ajax	1–2	0–3^{1}
Spartak Moscow (Soviet Union)	1–2	(Greece) AEK Athens	0–0	1–2
Genoa (Italy)	5–3	(Romania) Dinamo București	3–1	2–2
Hamburg (Germany)	6–1	(Bulgaria) CSKA Sofia	2–0	4–1
Gent (Belgium)	1–0	(Germany) Eintracht Frankfurt	0–0	1–0
Neuchâtel Xamax (Switzerland)	5–2	(Scotland) Celtic	5–1	0–1
Lyon (France)	4–8	(Turkey) Trabzonspor	3–4	1–4
PAOK (Greece)	0–4	(Austria) Swarovski Tirol	0–2	0–2
Sigma Olomouc (Czechoslovakia)	2–0	(Soviet Union) Torpedo Moscow	2–0	0–0
Sporting Gijón (Spain)	2–3	(Romania) Steaua București	2–2	0–1
Torino (Italy)	2–0	(Portugal) Boavista	2–0	0–0

^{1} This match was played in Düsseldorf, Germany due to hooliganism in a previous match.

=== First leg ===
22 October 1991
20:45

Cannes (France)	0–1	(Soviet Union) Dynamo Moscow
	Report	Kiryakov 43'

Stade Pierre de Coubertin, Cannes
Attendance: 3,606
Referee: Ray Lewis (England)

22 October 1991
15:00

B 1903 (Denmark)	6–2	(Germany) Bayern Munich
Manniche 37', 64'; Nielsen 57' (pen.); Wegner 61'; Kaus 77'; Uldbjerg 88'	Report	Mazinho 32'; Münch 90'

Gentofte Stadion, Gentofte
Attendance: 12,400
Referee: Jim McCluskey (Scotland)

22 October 1991
21:00

Osasuna (Spain)	0–0	(Germany) Stuttgart
	Report

Estadio El Sadar, Pamplona
Attendance: 18,000
Referee: George Courtney (England)

22 October 1991
20:15

Hamburg (Germany)	2–0	(Bulgaria) CSKA Sofia
Rohde 36', 88'	Report

Volksparkstadion, Hamburg
Attendance: 8,120
Referee: Sergei Khusainov (Soviet Union)

22 October 1991
17:30

Gent (Belgium)	0–0	(Germany) Eintracht Frankfurt
	Report

Jules Ottenstadion, Ghent
Attendance: 4,686
Referee: Loizos Loizou (Cyprus)

22 October 1991
20:15

Neuchâtel Xamax (Switzerland)	5–1	(Scotland) Celtic
H. Hassan 10', 20', 56', 74'; Bonvin 38'	Report	O'Neil 60'

Stade de la Maladière, Neuchâtel
Attendance: 11,300
Referee: Alphonse Constantin (Belgium)

23 October 1991
18:00

Auxerre (France)	2–0	(England) Liverpool
Ferreri 42'; Kovács 60'	Report

Stade de l'Abbé-Deschamps, Auxerre
Attendance: 13,508
Referee: Jan Damgaard (Denmark)

23 October 1991
19:00

Utrecht (Netherlands)	1–3	(Spain) Real Madrid
Smolarek 19'	Report	Prosinečki 45'; Roest 65' (o.g.); Villarroya 75'

Stadion Nieuw Galgenwaard, Utrecht
Attendance: 17,500
Referee: Lajos Németh (Hungary)

23 October 1991
17:00

Rot-Weiß Erfurt (Germany)	1–2	(Netherlands) Ajax
Schulz 39'	Report	Jonk 46'; Bergkamp 78'

Steigerwaldstadion, Erfurt
Attendance: 6,100
Referee: Joaquín Ramos Marcos (Spain)

23 October 1991
17:00

Spartak Moscow (Soviet Union)	0–0	(Greece) AEK Athens
	Report

Central Lenin Stadium, Moscow
Attendance: 17,000
Referee: Lajos Hartmann (Hungary)

23 October 1991
20:30

Genoa (Italy)	3–1	(Romania) Dinamo București
Aguilera 15', 59' (pen.); Branco 22'	Report	Munteanu 88'

Stadio Luigi Ferraris, Genoa
Attendance: 37,053
Referee: Leif Sundell (Sweden)

23 October 1991
20:45

Lyon (France)	3–4	(Turkey) Trabzonspor
Bouderbala 60'; Bursać 64'; Fernández 78'	Report	Suna 50'; Mandıralı 52', 76'; Orhan 89'

Stade de Gerland, Lyon
Attendance: 13,596
Referee: Brian McGinlay (Scotland)

23 October 1991
14:00

PAOK (Greece)	0–2	(Austria) Swarovski Tirol
	Report	Westerthaler 52', 79'

Toumba Stadium, Thessaloniki
Attendance: 140
Referee: Emilio Soriano Aladrén (Spain)

23 October 1991
14:30

Sigma Olomouc (Czechoslovakia)	2–0	(Soviet Union) Torpedo Moscow
Šindelář 59'; Maroši 89'	Report

Stadion Míru, Olomouc
Attendance: 5,029
Referee: Egil Nervik (Norway)

24 October 1991
20:30

Sporting Gijón (Spain)	2–2	(Romania) Steaua București
Luhový 45'; Stan 90' (o.g.)	Report	Popa 28'; Dumitrescu 60'

El Molinón, Gijón
Attendance: 17,000
Referee: Günther Habermann (Germany)

24 October 1991
20:30

Torino (Italy)	2–0	(Portugal) Boavista
Lentini 2'; Annoni 69'	Report

Stadio delle Alpi, Turin
Attendance: 41,186
Referee: Keith Hackett (England)

=== Second leg ===
5 November 1991
18:00

Bayern Munich (Germany)	1–0	(Denmark) B 1903
Mazinho 89'	Report

Olympiastadion, Munich
Attendance: 22,000
Referee: Joaquín Urío Velázquez (Spain)

B 1903 won 6–3 on aggregate.

5 November 1991
20:15

Stuttgart (Germany)	2–3	(Spain) Osasuna
Buchwald 80'; Sverrisson 89'	Report	Urban 8', 47'; Merino 17'

Neckarstadion, Stuttgart
Attendance: 9,500
Referee: Mario van der Ende (Netherlands)

Osasuna won 3–2 on aggregate.

6 November 1991
20:10

Liverpool (England)	3–0	(France) Auxerre
Mølby 4' (pen.); Marsh 30'; Walters 83'	Report

Anfield, Liverpool
Attendance: 23,094
Referee: Carlos Silva Valente (Portugal)

Liverpool won 3–2 on aggregate.

6 November 1991
17:00

Dynamo Moscow (Soviet Union)	1–1	(France) Cannes
Kobelev 43' (pen.)	Report	Omam-Biyik 9'

Central Dinamo Stadium, Moscow
Attendance: 6,200
Referee: Frans Van Den Wijngaert (Belgium)

Dynamo Moscow won 2–1 on aggregate.

6 November 1991
21:00

Real Madrid (Spain)	1–0	(Netherlands) Utrecht
Hagi 19'	Report

Estadio Santiago Bernabéu, Madrid
Attendance: 17,520
Referee: Serge Muhmenthaler (Switzerland)

Real Madrid won 4–1 on aggregate.

6 November 1991
20:00

Ajax (Netherlands)	3–0	(Germany) Rot-Weiß Erfurt
Pettersson 28'; Blind 58' van Loen 84'	Report

Rheinstadion, Düsseldorf
Attendance: 7,000
Referee: Patrick Kelly (Republic of Ireland)

Because of hooliganism in a previous match, Ajax was ordered to play this match at least 200 km away from Amsterdam. Ajax won 5–1 on aggregate.

6 November 1991
17:00

AEK Athens (Greece)	2–1	(Soviet Union) Spartak Moscow
Batista 64'; Dimitriadis 74'	Report	Mostovoi 35' (pen.)

Nikos Goumas Stadium, Athens
Attendance: 28,025
Referee: Antonio Martín Navarrete (Spain)

AEK won 2–1 on aggregate.

6 November 1991
12:30

Dinamo București (Romania)	2–2	(Italy) Genoa
Gerstenmájer 68'; Cristea 89'	Report	Matei 8' (o.g.); Aguilera 53'

Stadionul Dinamo, Bucharest
Attendance: 8,300
Referee: Ray Lewis (England)

Genoa won 5–3 on aggregate.

6 November 1991
15:00

CSKA Sofia (Bulgaria)	1–4	(Germany) Hamburg
E. Dimitrov 43' (pen.)	Report	Spörl 33', 83'; Furtok 55' (pen.); Bode 86'

Stadion Balgarska Armia, Sofia
Attendance: 30,000
Referee: Arcangelo Pezzella (Italy)

Hamburg won 6–1 on aggregate.

6 November 1991
18:00

Eintracht Frankfurt (Germany)	0–1	(Belgium) Gent
	Report	Vandenbergh 35'

Waldstadion, Frankfurt am Main
Attendance: 11,500
Referee: Alain Delmer (France)

Gent won 1–0 on aggregate.

6 November 1991
20:10

Celtic (Scotland)	1–0	(Switzerland) Neuchâtel Xamax
Miller 52'	Report

Celtic Park, Glasgow
Attendance: 25,454
Referee: Pierluigi Pairetto (Italy)

Neuchâtel Xamax won 5–2 on aggregate.

6 November 1991
11:15

Trabzonspor (Turkey)	4–1	(France) Lyon
Mandıralı 19', 81'; Aslan 27'; Orhan 44'	Report	Bursać 41'

Hüseyin Avni Aker Stadium, Trabzon
Attendance: 18,000
Referee: Karl-Josef Assenmacher (Germany)

Trabzonspor won 8–4 on aggregate.

6 November 1991
18:30

Swarovski Tirol (Austria)	2–0	(Greece) PAOK
Westerthaler 27', 66'	Report

Tivoli-Stadion, Innsbruck
Attendance: 8,000
Referee: Vojtech Christov (Czechoslovakia)

Swarovski Tirol won 4–0 on aggregate.

6 November 1991
22:30

Boavista (Portugal)	0–0	(Italy) Torino
	Report

Estádio do Bessa, Porto
Attendance: 6,896
Referee: Bo Karlsson (Sweden)

Torino won 2–0 on aggregate.

7 November 1991
12:00

Torpedo Moscow (Soviet Union)	0–0	(Czechoslovakia) Sigma Olomouc
	Report

Torpedo Stadium, Moscow
Attendance: 3,700
Referee: Hristo Tonchev (Bulgaria)

Sigma Olomouc won 2–0 on aggregate.

7 November 1991
19:00

Steaua București (Romania)	1–0	(Spain) Sporting Gijón
Popa 59'	Report

Stadionul Steaua, Bucharest
Attendance: 9,260
Referee: Joël Quiniou (France)

Steaua București won 3–2 on aggregate.

== Third round ==
Team 1	Agg.	Team 2	1st leg	2nd leg
AEK Athens (Greece)	2–3	(Italy) Torino	2–2	0–1
B 1903 (Denmark)	2–1	(Turkey) Trabzonspor	1–0	1–1
Osasuna (Spain)	0–2	(Netherlands) Ajax	0–1	0–1^{1}
Swarovski Tirol (Austria)	0–6	(England) Liverpool	0–2	0–4
Hamburg (Germany)	2–6	(Czechoslovakia) Sigma Olomouc	1–2	1–4
Gent (Belgium)	2–0	(Soviet Union) Dynamo Moscow	2–0	0–0
Neuchâtel Xamax (Switzerland)	1–4	(Spain) Real Madrid	1–0	0–4
Steaua București (Romania)	0–2	(Italy) Genoa	0–1	0–1

^{1} This match was played in Düsseldorf, Germany due to hooliganism in a previous match.

=== First leg ===
27 November 1991
18:00

AEK Athens (Greece)	2–2	(Italy) Torino
Batista 21'; Šabanadžović 72'	Report	Casagrande 33'; Bresciani 36'

Nikos Goumas Stadium, Athens
Attendance: 29,000
Referee: Aron Schmidhuber (Germany)

27 November 1991
19:00

B 1903 (Denmark)	1–0	(Turkey) Trabzonspor
Højer 44'	Report

Gentofte Stadion, Gentofte
Attendance: 12,100
Referee: Sándor Puhl (Hungary)

27 November 1991
22:15

Osasuna (Spain)	0–1	(Netherlands) Ajax
	Report	Bergkamp 47'

Estadio El Sadar, Pamplona
Attendance: 18,000
Referee: Pietro D'Elia (Italy)

27 November 1991
18:30

Swarovski Tirol (Austria)	0–2	(England) Liverpool
	Report	Saunders 58', 79'

Tivoli-Stadion, Innsbruck
Attendance: 12,500
Referee: Erik Fredriksson (Sweden)

27 November 1991
20:15

Hamburg (Germany)	1–2	(Czechoslovakia) Sigma Olomouc
Furtok 21'	Report	Hapal 10', 45'

Volksparkstadion, Hamburg
Attendance: 23,000
Referee: Jan Damgaard (Denmark)

27 November 1991
19:30

Gent (Belgium)	2–0	(Soviet Union) Dynamo Moscow
Vandenbergh 31'; Van Der Linden 86'	Report

Jules Ottenstadion, Ghent
Attendance: 5,455
Referee: Ion Crăciunescu (Romania)

27 November 1991
20:30

Neuchâtel Xamax (Switzerland)	1–0	(Spain) Real Madrid
I. Hassan 35'	Report

Stade de la Maladière, Neuchâtel
Attendance: 20,400
Referee: Mario van der Ende (Netherlands)

27 November 1991
18:00

Steaua București (Romania)	0–1	(Italy) Genoa
	Report	Skuhravý 21'

Stadionul Steaua, Bucharest
Attendance: 23,000
Referee: Emilio Soriano Aladrén (Spain)

=== Second leg ===
10 December 1991
13:00

Sigma Olomouc (Czechoslovakia)	4–1	(Germany) Hamburg
Kerbr 13'; Hapal 64'; Látal 70'; Hanuš 76'	Report	Spörl 60'

Stadion Míru, Olomouc
Attendance: 12,288
Referee: Zoran Petrović (Yugoslavia)

Sigma Olomouc won 6–2 on aggregate.

11 December 1991
20:30

Torino (Italy)	1–0	(Greece) AEK Athens
Casagrande 54'	Report

Stadio delle Alpi, Turin
Attendance: 34,147
Referee: Guy Goethals (Belgium)

Torino won 3–2 on aggregate.

11 December 1991
11:15

Trabzonspor (Turkey)	1–1	(Denmark) B 1903
Aslan 57'	Report	Manniche 83'

Hüseyin Avni Aker Stadium, Trabzon
Attendance: 18,000
Referee: Alphonse Costantin (Belgium)

B 1903 won 2–1 on aggregate.

11 December 1991
20:00

Ajax (Netherlands)	1–0	(Spain) Osasuna
Bergkamp 12'	Report

Rheinstadion, Düsseldorf
Attendance: 8,000
Referee: Aleksey Spirin (Soviet Union)

Because of hooliganism in a previous match, Ajax was ordered to play this match at least 200 km away from Amsterdam. Ajax won 2–0 on aggregate.

11 December 1991
20:10

Liverpool (England)	4–0	(Austria) Swarovski Tirol
Saunders 40', 57', 68'; Venison 80'	Report

Anfield, Liverpool
Attendance: 16,007
Referee: Luben Spasov (Bulgaria)

Liverpool won 6–0 on aggregate.

11 December 1991
18:00

Dynamo Moscow (Soviet Union)	0–0	(Belgium) Gent
	Report

Lokomotiv Stadium, Simferopol
Attendance: 6,300
Referee: Karl-Josef Assenmacher (Germany)

Gent won 2–0 on aggregate.

11 December 1991
18:00

Genoa (Italy)	1–0	(Romania) Steaua București
Aguilera 60'	Report

Stadio Luigi Ferraris, Genoa
Attendance: 30,000
Referee: Jozef Marko (Czechoslovakia)

Genoa won 2–0 on aggregate.

12 December 1991
21:00

Real Madrid (Spain)	4–0	(Switzerland) Neuchâtel Xamax
I. Hassan 47' (o.g.); Hagi 53'; Míchel 63' (pen.); Sanchís 68'	Report

Estadio Santiago Bernabéu, Madrid
Attendance: 59,000
Referee: Joël Quiniou (France)

Real Madrid won 4–1 on aggregate.

== Quarter-finals ==
Team 1	Agg.	Team 2	1st leg	2nd leg
B 1903 (Denmark)	0–3	(Italy) Torino	0–2	0–1
Genoa (Italy)	4–1	(England) Liverpool	2–0	2–1
Gent (Belgium)	0–3	(Netherlands) Ajax	0–0	0–3
Sigma Olomouc (Czechoslovakia)	1–2	(Spain) Real Madrid	1–1	0–1

=== First leg ===
4 March 1992
18:00

B 1903 (Denmark)	0–2	(Italy) Torino
	Report	Casagrande 37'; Policano 81'

Gentofte Stadion, Gentofte
Attendance: 14,600
Referee: Luben Spasov (Bulgaria)

4 March 1992
20:30

Genoa (Italy)	2–0	(England) Liverpool
Fiorin 39'; Branco 88'	Report

Stadio Luigi Ferraris, Genoa
Attendance: 37,683
Referee: Hubert Forstinger (Austria)

4 March 1992
19:30

Gent (Belgium)	0–0	(Netherlands) Ajax
	Report

Jules Ottenstadion, Ghent
Attendance: 13,040
Referee: Sándor Puhl (Hungary)

4 March 1992
15:00

Sigma Olomouc (Czechoslovakia)	1–1	(Spain) Real Madrid
Hapal 26'	Report	Hierro 45'

Stadion Míru, Olomouc
Attendance: 14,213
Referee: Tullio Lanese (Italy)

=== Second leg ===
18 March 1992
20:10

Liverpool (England)	1–2	(Italy) Genoa
Rush 49'	Report	Aguilera 27', 72'

Anfield, Liverpool
Attendance: 38,840
Referee: Frans Van Den Wijngaert (Belgium)

Genoa won 4–1 on aggregate.

18 March 1992
20:00

Ajax (Netherlands)	3–0	(Belgium) Gent
Kreek 7'; Bergkamp 10'; Jonk 89'	Report

Olympisch Stadion, Amsterdam
Attendance: 41,000
Referee: Leif Sundell (Sweden)

Ajax won 3–0 on aggregate.

18 March 1992
21:15

Real Madrid (Spain)	1–0	(Czechoslovakia) Sigma Olomouc
Sánchez 82'	Report

Estadio Santiago Bernabéu, Madrid
Attendance: 36,000
Referee: Alphonse Costantin (Belgium)

Real Madrid won 2–1 on aggregate.

19 March 1992
20:30

Torino (Italy)	1–0	(Denmark) B 1903
Højer 30' (o.g.)	Report

Stadio delle Alpi, Turin
Attendance: 28,577
Referee: Andrew Waddell (Scotland)

Torino won 3–0 on aggregate.

== Semi-finals ==
Team 1	Agg.	Team 2	1st leg	2nd leg
Genoa (Italy)	3–4	(Netherlands) Ajax	2–3	1–1
Real Madrid (Spain)	2–3	(Italy) Torino	2–1	0–2

=== First leg ===
1 April 1992
18:00

Genoa (Italy)	2–3	(Netherlands) Ajax
Aguilera 72', 80'	Report	Pettersson 1'; Roy 60'; Winter 89'

Stadio Luigi Ferraris, Genoa
Attendance: 39,187
Referee: Kim Milton Nielsen (Denmark)

1 April 1992
21:00

Real Madrid (Spain)	2–1	(Italy) Torino
Hagi 61'; Hierro 65'	Report	Casagrande 59'

Estadio Santiago Bernabéu, Madrid
Attendance: 62,876
Referee: Hubert Forstinger (Austria)

=== Second leg ===
15 April 1992
19:00

Ajax (Netherlands)	1–1	(Italy) Genoa
Bergkamp 46'	Report	Iorio 38'

Olympisch Stadion, Amsterdam
Attendance: 44,025
Referee: Gérard Biguet (France)

Ajax won 4–3 on aggregate.

15 April 1992
20:30

Torino (Italy)	2–0	(Spain) Real Madrid
Ricardo Rocha 7' (o.g.); Fusi 74'	Report

Stadio delle Alpi, Turin
Attendance: 59,861
Referee: Bruno Galler (Switzerland)

Torino won 3–2 on aggregate.

== Final ==
=== First leg ===
29 April 1992
20:30

Torino (Italy)	2–2	(Netherlands) Ajax
Casagrande 62', 82'	Report	Jonk 14'; Pettersson 73' (pen.)

Stadio delle Alpi, Turin
Attendance: 65,377
Referee: Joe Worrall (England)

=== Second leg ===
13 May 1992
20:30

Ajax (Netherlands)	0–0	(Italy) Torino
	Report

Olympisch Stadion, Amsterdam
Attendance: 42,000
Referee: Zoran Petrović (Yugoslavia)

2–2 on aggregate. Ajax won on away goals.

== Top scorers ==
The top scorers from the 1991–92 UEFA Cup are as follows:

Rank	Name	Team	Goals
1	(Wales) Dean Saunders	(England) Liverpool	9
2	(Uruguay) Carlos Aguilera	(Italy) Genoa	8
3	(Netherlands) Dennis Bergkamp	(Netherlands) Ajax	6
3	(Brazil) Walter Casagrande	(Italy) Torino	6
5	(Turkey) Hami Mandıralı	(Turkey) Trabzonspor	5
5	(Austria) Christoph Westerthaler	(Austria) Swarovski Tirol	5
7	(Czechoslovakia) Pavel Hapal	(Czechoslovakia) Sigma Olomouc	4
7	(Egypt) Hossam Hassan	(Switzerland) Neuchâtel Xamax	4
7	(Sweden) Stefan Pettersson	(Netherlands) Ajax	4
7	(Germany) Harald Spörl	(Germany) Hamburger SV	4
7	(Netherlands) Aron Winter	(Netherlands) Ajax	4
12	(Turkey) Hamdi Aslan	(Turkey) Trabzonspor	3
12	(Greece) Daniel Batista Lima	(Greece) AEK Athens	3
12	(France) Jean-Marc Ferreri	(France) Auxerre	3
12	(Romania) Gábor Gerstenmájer	(Romania) Dinamo București	3
12	(Romania) Gheorghe Hagi	(Spain) Real Madrid	3
12	(Netherlands) Wim Jonk	(Netherlands) Ajax	3
12	(Czechoslovakia) Milan Kerbr	(Czechoslovakia) Sigma Olomouc	3
12	(Denmark) Michael Manniche	(Denmark) B 1903	3
12	(Socialist Federal Republic of Yugoslavia) Željko Petrović	(Socialist Federal Republic of Yugoslavia) HAŠK Građanski	3
12	(Czechoslovakia) Radek Sindelar	(Czechoslovakia) Sigma Olomouc	3
12	(Czechoslovakia) Tomáš Skuhravý	(Italy) Genoa	3
12	(Poland) Włodzimierz Smolarek	(Netherlands) Utrecht	3
12	(Romania) Ilie Stan	(Romania) Steaua București	3
