= 1993–94 Eintracht Frankfurt season =

Eintracht Frankfurt
1993-94 season
- Chairman: Matthias Ohms
- Manager: Klaus Toppmöller (sacked 10 April 1994); Charly Körbel (signed 10 April 1994)
- Bundesliga: 5th
- DFB-Pokal: Second round
- UEFA Cup: Quarterfinals
- Top goalscorer: League: Anthony Yeboah (18); All: Anthony Yeboah (20)
- Highest home attendance: 60,500 23 October 1993 v Bayern Munich (league)
- Lowest home attendance: 19,000 16 April 1994 v Wattenscheid 09 (league)
- Average home league attendance: 31,647
Home colours	Away colours

The 1993–94 Eintracht Frankfurt season was the 94th season in the club's football history. In 1993–94 the club played in the Bundesliga, the top tier of German football. It was the club's 31st season in the Bundesliga. Eintracht Frankfurt striker Tony Yeboah won the Bundesliga top goalscorer and scored, like Kaiserslautern's Stefan Kuntz, 18 Bundesliga goals.

== Friendlies ==
Win Draw Loss

26 June 1993	Pogoń Szczecin	0–2	Eintracht Frankfurt
	(Report)	(Report)	Anthony Yeboah 5', 74'	Attendance: 4,000

27 June 1993	Eintracht Frankfurt/Oder	0–15	Eintracht Frankfurt	Frankfurt (Oder), Germany
14:00 CEST		(Report)	Rahn; Weber; Yeboah; Binz; Gaudino; Reis; Dickhaut; Komljenović	Stadium: Stadion der Freundschaft; Attendance: 5,000

3 July 1993	KSV Hessen Kassel	1–1	Eintracht Frankfurt
	Iordache 35'	(Report)	Gaudino 33'	Attendance: 3,000; Referee: Kloppmann

4 July 1993	Borussia Neunkirchen	0–4	Eintracht Frankfurt	Neunkirchen, Germany
18:00 CEST		(Report)	Yeboah; Gaudino; Furtok	Stadium: Ellenfeldstadion; Attendance: 3,000

9 July 1993	FSV Bergen	1–19	Eintracht Frankfurt
	Goal	(Report)	Bein; Yeboah; Gaudino; Falkenmayer; Furtok; Bommer; Binz; Bindewald; Dickhaut	Attendance: 2,000

14 July 1993	Innsbrucker SK	0–19	Eintracht Frankfurt
		(Report)	Furtok; Bein; Yeboah; Gaudino; Weber; Binz; Tskhadadze; Bommer; Falkenmayer	Attendance: 700

15 July 1993	Hertha BSC	2–2	Eintracht Frankfurt	Seefeld, Austria
	Goal	(Report)	Rahn; Dickhaut	Attendance: 500

16 July 1993 Tournoi de Paris; Semi-Final	AJ Auxerre	6–2	Eintracht Frankfurt	Paris, France
18:30 CEST	Martins 10', 41'; Laslandes 18', 55', 59'; Cocard 78'	(Report)	Tskhadadze 64'; Yeboah 75'	Stadium: Parc des Princes

17 July 1993 Tournoi de Paris; 3rd place play-off	Eintracht Frankfurt	4–1	Fluminense	Paris, France
18:30 CEST	Weber 47', 64'; Furtok 66'; Gaudino 70'	(Report)	Junho 27'	Stadium: Parc des Princes

19 July 1993 Fuji-Cup; Semi-Final	Borussia Dortmund	0–0 (5–4 p)	Eintracht Frankfurt	Lüdenscheid, Germany
		(Report)		Stadium: Nattenberg-Stadion; Attendance: 10,000
	Penalties
	Penalty scored		(penalty scored) Bein; (penalty scored) Okocha; (penalty scored) Gaudino; (penalty scored) Stein (penalty missed)

21 July 1993 Fuji-Cup; 3rd place play-off	Werder Bremen	3–1	Eintracht Frankfurt	Marburg, Germany
	Goal	(Report)	Votava (o.g.)	Stadium: Georg-Gaßmann-Stadion; Attendance: 8,000

24 July 1993	TV Marktheidenfeld	0–10	Eintracht Frankfurt
		(Report)	Bein; Falkenmayer; Binz (2; Dickhaut; Reis; Weber	Attendance: 3,000

25 July 1993	VfB Bottrop	1–8	Eintracht Frankfurt
		(Report)	Falkenmayer; Reis; Binz; Weber; Furtok; Komljenović	Attendance: 3,000

28 July 1993	Eintracht Frankfurt	3–1	Rotor Volgograd	Hanau, Germany
19:00 CEST	Furtok; Binz	(Report)	Goal	Stadium: Herbert-Dröse-Stadion; Attendance: 1,500

30 July 1993	FSV Steinbach	0–9	Eintracht Frankfurt
		(Report)	Yeboah; Furtok; Gaudino; Falkenmayer; Andersen; Weber; Tskhadadze

31 July 1993	EFC Büdesheim / FC 66 Büdesheim	0–15	Eintracht Frankfurt	Büdesheim, Germany
16:00 CEST		(Report)	Bein; Binz; Furtok; Tskhadadze; Komljenović; Yeboah; Okocha; Andersen	Stadium: Sportanlage im Schloßpark; Attendance: 2,000

15 August 1993	VfR 19 Limburg	2–10	Eintracht Frankfurt
	Goal	(Report)	Yeboah; Andersen; Reis; Sobotzik; Komljenović; Weber	Attendance: 3,000

25 October 1993	Galatasaray	2–2	Eintracht Frankfurt
		(Report)	Dickhaut; Andersen

17 November 1993	TSV Wolfskehlen/ Viktoria Griesheim / SKV Büttelborn	1–4	Eintracht Frankfurt
	Nagel	(Report)	Mihajlović 36'; Andersen 42', 55', 78'	Attendance: 3,000

22 January 1994	Rot-Weiß Walldorf	4–1	Eintracht Frankfurt	Mörfelden-Walldorf, Germany
	Holtkamp 25'; Baydar 40'; Ferreiro 60'; Gisinger 68'	(Report)	Osei 80'

23 January 1994	VfB Gießen	0–6	Eintracht Frankfurt
		(Report)	Weber 10', 35'; Wolf 16'; Furtok 18'; Sobotzik 40'; Falkenmayer 63'	Attendance: 400

29 January 1994	TSV Heusenstamm	0–13	Eintracht Frankfurt
		(Report)	Bein; Furtok; Mihajlović; Weber; Falkenmayer; Ernst; Trbojević	Attendance: 1,000

30 January 1994	TuS Montabaur	0–9	Eintracht Frankfurt
		(Report)	Mihajlović; Falkenmayer; Bein; Furtok; Gaudino; Sobotzik	Attendance: 400

1 February 1994	CD San Fernando	1–4	Eintracht Frankfurt	Spain
	Alfonso 67'	(Report)	Binz 4'; Bein 25' (pen.); Mihajlović 38'; Becker 56'	Attendance: 500

3 February 1994	Xerez CD	1–3	Eintracht Frankfurt	Jerez, Spain
	Camacho 32'	(Report)	Binz 15'; Furtok 25'; Okocha 86'	Attendance: 200

4 February 1994	Rot-Weiss Essen	1–1	Eintracht Frankfurt	Chiclana, Germany
	Grein 4'	(Report)	Komljenović 83'	Attendance: 200

14 May 1994	Vorwärts Nordhorn	3–8	Eintracht Frankfurt
	Goal	(Report)	Furtok; Bein; Wolf; Dickhaut (o.g.)	Attendance: 2,500

15 May 1994	Flensburg 08	0–3	Eintracht Frankfurt	Flensburg, Germany
18:00 CEST		(Report)	Binz; Aničić; Furtok	Stadium: Flensburger Stadion; Attendance: 2,000

22 May 1994	Colombia	4–0	Eintracht Frankfurt	Medellín, Colombia
		(Report)		Attendance: 21,000

28 May 1994	SpVgg Biebertal	2–9	Eintracht Frankfurt
	Goal	(Report)	Furtok; Yeboah; Hagner; Osei; Wolf	Attendance: 2,100

29 May 1994	FC Thüringen Weida	1–6	Eintracht Frankfurt	Weida, Germany
	Wengler 26'	(Report)	Furtok 31'; Binz 37'; Becker 49', 61'; Hagner 72', 80'	Stadium: Sportanlage Roter Hügel; Attendance: 3,500

31 May 1994	Brandenburger SC Süd 05	3–2	Eintracht Frankfurt	Brandenburg, Germany
18:30 CEST	Priebe 12'; Kirchner 40', 66'	(Report)	Bommer 1'; Furtok 55'	Stadium: Werner-Seelenbinder-Sportplatz; Attendance: 2,200

1 June 1994	DJK Zeilsheim	1–6	Eintracht Frankfurt	Frankfurt, Germany
	Schmitt 10'	(Report)	Hagner 11', 55', 88'; Binz 18'; Dickhaut 28'; Becker 30'	Attendance: 3,000

2 June 1994	TSV Gomaringen	1–12	Eintracht Frankfurt
	Hechler 85'	(Report)	Becker; Aničić; Wolf; Bindewald; Hechler (o.g.); Osei; Ernst; Tskhadadze; Weber; Bulut

3 June 1994	Hesse XI	3–2	Eintracht Frankfurt	Groß-Gerau, Germany
18:00 CEST	Goal	(Report)	Aničić; Dworschak	Stadium: VfR-Stadion; Attendance: 2,500

4 June 1994	FV Breidenbach	2–6	Eintracht Frankfurt	Breidenbach, Germany
16:00 CEST	Goal	(Report)	Yeboah; Falkenmayer; Aničić	Stadium: Gunterstalstadion

5 June 1994	SV Merseburg 99	0–4	Eintracht Frankfurt	Merseburg, Germany
15:00 CEST		(Report)	Furtok; Weber; Wolf	Stadium: Stadtstadion

7 June 1994	VfL Germania 1894	1–4	Eintracht Frankfurt	Frankfurt, Germany
19:00 CEST	Goal	(Report)	Weber; Möller; Komljenović	Stadium: Mainwasen; Attendance: 2,000

== Competitions ==
Win Draw Loss

=== Bundesliga ===
==== League table ====
Pos	Team	Pld	W	D	L	GF	GA	GD	Pts	Qualification or relegation
3	Bayer Leverkusen	34	14	11	9	60	47	+13	39	Qualification to UEFA Cup first round
4	Borussia Dortmund	34	15	9	10	49	45	+4	39	Qualification to UEFA Cup first round
5	Eintracht Frankfurt	34	15	8	11	57	41	+16	38	Qualification to UEFA Cup first round
6	Karlsruher SC	34	14	10	10	46	43	+3	38	
7	VfB Stuttgart	34	13	11	10	51	43	+8	37	

Source: www.dfb.de
Rules for classification: 1) points; 2) goal difference; 3) number of goals scored.

==== Results by round ====
Round	1	2	3	4	5	6	7	8	9	10	11	12	13	14	15	16	17	18	19	20	21	22	23	24	25	26	27	28	29	30	31	32	33	34
Ground	A	H	H	A	H	A	H	A	H	A	H	A	H	A	H	A	H	H	A	A	H	A	H	A	H	A	H	A	H	A	H	A	H	A
Result	W	D	W	W	W	W	W	D	W	W	W	L	D	D	W	L	L	L	L	D	D	L	L	W	W	W	D	L	L	L	W	L	D	W
Position	2	3	2	1	1	1	1	1	1	1	1	1	1	1	1	1	1	1	2	2	1	4	6	3	2	2	2	2	2	5	3	6	6	5

Source: kicker.de
A = Away; H = Home; W = Win; D = Draw; L = Loss

==== Matches ====
6 August 1993 1	Borussia Mönchengladbach	0–4	Eintracht Frankfurt	Mönchengladbach, Germany
15:30 CEST		(Report)	Furtok 33'; Bein 36'; Weber 71'; Yeboah 82'	Stadium: Bökelbergstadion; Attendance: 34,500; Referee: Osmers

14 August 1993 2	Eintracht Frankfurt	2–2	Werder Bremen	Frankfurt, Germany
15:30 CEST	Yeboah 22'; Furtok 70'	(Report)	Beiersdorfer 12'; Bode 54'	Stadium: Waldstadion; Attendance: 43,000; Referee: Assenmacher

21 August 1993 3	Eintracht Frankfurt	1–0	1. FC Kaiserslautern	Frankfurt, Germany
15:30 CEST	Yeboah 16'	(Report)		Stadium: Waldstadion; Attendance: 32,000; Referee: Weber

28 August 1993 4	1. FC Nürnberg	1–5	Eintracht Frankfurt	Nuremberg, Germany
15:30 CEST	Zárate 54' (pen.)	(Report)	Yeboah 29', 83'; Bein 32'; Dickhaut 89'; Binz 90'	Stadium: Frankenstadion; Attendance: 44,000; Referee: Gläser

31 August 1993 5	Eintracht Frankfurt	3–1	Karlsruher SC	Frankfurt, Germany
20:00 CEST	Bein 48', 77'; Okocha 87'	(Report)	Schmitt 66'	Stadium: Waldstadion; Attendance: 32,000; Referee: Krug

4 September 1993 6	FC Schalke 04	1–3	Eintracht Frankfurt	Gelsenkirchen, Germany
15:30 CEST	Linke 42'	(Report)	Yeboah 20'; Bein 44'; Gaudino 69'	Stadium: Parkstadion; Attendance: 24,500; Referee: Kasper

8 September 1993 7	Eintracht Frankfurt	3–0	SC Freiburg	Frankfurt, Germany
20:00 CEST	Yeboah 2', 42', 90'	(Report)		Stadium: Waldstadion; Attendance: 29,000; Referee: Schmidhuber

18 September 1993 8	Bayer Leverkusen	2–2	Eintracht Frankfurt	Leverkusen, Germany
20:00 CEST	Foda 61' (pen.); Fischer 80'		Dickhaut 66'; Andersen 90'	Stadium: Ulrich-Haberland-Stadion; Attendance: 25,000; Referee: Bernd Heynemann

24 September 1993 9	Eintracht Frankfurt	3–2	Dynamo Dresden	Frankfurt, Germany
20:00 CEST	Andersen 46'; Gaudino 50'; Furtok 69'	(Report)	Kmetsch 20'; Jähnig 62'	Stadium: Waldstadion; Attendance: 22,000; Referee: Jansen

2 October 1993 10	VfB Stuttgart	0–2	Eintracht Frankfurt	Stuttgart, Germany
15:30 CEST		(Report)	Gaudino 70'; Bein 84'	Stadium: Gottlieb-Daimler-Stadion; Attendance: 45,000; Referee: Assenmacher

9 October 1993 11	Eintracht Frankfurt	2–1	VfB Leipzig	Frankfurt, Germany
15:30 CEST	Furtok 27', 87'	(Report)	Edmond 86'	Stadium: Waldstadion; Attendance: 22,500; Referee: Dardenne

15 October 1993 12	MSV Duisburg	1–0	Eintracht Frankfurt	Duisburg, Germany
19:30 CEST	Preetz 42'	(Report)		Stadium: Wedaustadion; Attendance: 26,000; Referee: Wiesel

23 October 1993 13	Eintracht Frankfurt	2–2	Bayern Munich	Frankfurt, Germany
15:30 CEST	Furtok 31'; Okocha 63'	(Report)	Nerlinger 35'; Matthäus 44'	Stadium: Waldstadion; Attendance: 60,500; Referee: Habermann

30 October 1993 14	SG Wattenscheid 09	0–0	Eintracht Frankfurt	Bochum, Germany
15:30 CEST		(Report)		Stadium: Lohrheidestadion; Attendance: 10,000; Referee: Fröhlich

6 November 1993 15	Eintracht Frankfurt	2–0	Borussia Dortmund	Frankfurt, Germany
15:30 CEST	Gaudino 82' (pen.); Bommer 90'	(Report)		Stadium: Waldstadion; Attendance: 44,500; Referee: Malbranc

13 November 1993 16	Hamburger SV	3–0	Eintracht Frankfurt	Hamburg, Germany
15:30 CEST	von Heesen 48' (pen.); Sassen 58'; Bäron 74'	(Report)		Stadium: Volksparkstadion; Attendance: 54,500; Referee: Weber

19 November 1993 17	Eintracht Frankfurt	0–3	1. FC Köln	Frankfurt, Germany
20:00 CEST		(Report)	Polster 62'; Steinmann 64'; Heldt 75'	Stadium: Waldstadion; Attendance: 29,000; Referee: Fleske

27 November 1993 18	Eintracht Frankfurt	0–3	Borussia Mönchengladbach	Frankfurt, Germany
15:30 CEST		(Report)	Dahlin 15', 39'; Max 60'	Stadium: Waldstadion; Attendance: 21,500; Referee: Osmers

4 December 1993 19	Werder Bremen	1–0	Eintracht Frankfurt	Bremen, Germany
15:30 CEST	Rufer 49'	(Report)		Stadium: Weserstadion; Attendance: 25,500; Referee: Heynemann

11 December 1993 20	1. FC Kaiserslautern	1–1	Eintracht Frankfurt	Kaiserslautern, Germany
15:30 CEST	Kuntz 2'	(Report)	Binz 18'	Stadium: Fritz-Walter-Stadion; Attendance: 37,500; Referee: Aust

12 February 1994 21	Eintracht Frankfurt	1–1	1. FC Nürnberg	Frankfurt, Germany
15:30 CEST	U Wolf 45' (o.g.)	(Report)	Kramny 33'	Stadium: Waldstadion; Attendance: 29,500; Referee: Fischer

19 February 1994 22	Karlsruher SC	1–0	Eintracht Frankfurt	Karlsruhe, Germany
15:30 CEST	Kiriakov 5'	(Report)		Stadium: Wildparkstadion; Attendance: 23,000; Referee: Jansen

26 February 1994 23	Eintracht Frankfurt	1–3	FC Schalke 04	Frankfurt, Germany
15:30 CEST	Yeboah 64'	(Report)	Sendscheid 33'; Mulder 65'; Anderbrügge 73' (pen.)	Stadium: Waldstadion; Attendance: 30,500; Referee: Fröhlich

6 March 1994 24	SC Freiburg	1–3	Eintracht Frankfurt	Freiburg, Germany
18:00 CEST	Borodyuk (27.)	(Report)	Yeboah 17', 36'; Maurizio Gaudino 86'	Stadium: Dreisamstadion; Attendance: 15,000; Referee: Malbranc

11 March 1994 25	Eintracht Frankfurt	2–0	Bayer Leverkusen	Frankfurt, Germany
20:00 CEST	Doll 20'; Yeboah 85'	(Report)		Stadium: Waldstadion; Attendance: 32,500; Referee: Gläser

19 March 1994 26	Dynamo Dresden	0–4	Eintracht Frankfurt	Dresden, Germany
15:30 CEST		(Report)	Becker 29'; Gaudino 63'; Yeboah 66'; Falkenmayer 87'	Stadium: Rudolf-Harbig-Stadion; Attendance: 14,000; Referee: Weber

26 March 1994 27	Eintracht Frankfurt	0–0	VfB Stuttgart	Frankfurt, Germany
15:30 CEST		(Report)		Stadium: Waldstadion; Attendance: 34,000; Referee: Kasper

2 April 1994 28	VfB Leipzig	1–0	Eintracht Frankfurt	Leipzig, Germany
15:30 CEST	Rische 29'	(Report)		Stadium: Zentralstadion; Attendance: 8,500; Referee: Dellwing

6 April 1994 29	Eintracht Frankfurt	1–2	MSV Duisburg	Frankfurt, Germany
20:00 CEST	Yeboah 76'	(Report)	Weidemann 24', 90'	Stadium: Waldstadion; Attendance: 22,000; Referee: Hauer

9 April 1994 30	Bayern Munich	2–1	Eintracht Frankfurt	Munich, Germany
15:30 CEST	Scholl 39'; Matthäus 54' (pen.); Helmer (yellow card) 74' (yellow-red card)	(Report)	Yeboah 45'	Stadium: Olympiastadion; Attendance: 63,000; Referee: Aust

16 April 1994 31	Eintracht Frankfurt	5–1	SG Wattenscheid 09	Frankfurt, Germany
15:30 CEST	Yeboah 25'; Reis 29'; Binz 52'; Dickhaut 54'; Skok 66' (o.g.)	(Report)	Sané 86'	Stadium: Waldstadion; Attendance: 19,000; Referee: Heynemann

23 April 1994 32	Borussia Dortmund	2–0	Eintracht Frankfurt	Dortmund, Germany
15:30 CEST	Riedle 3'; Tskhadadze 68' (o.g.)	(Report)		Stadium: Westfalenstadion; Attendance: 43,000; Referee: Ziller

30 April 1994 33	Eintracht Frankfurt	1–1	Hamburger SV	Frankfurt, Germany
20:00 CEST	Weber 23'	(Report)	Bäron 15'; Kober (yellow card) 63' (yellow-red card)	Stadium: Waldstadion; Attendance: 34,500; Referee: Jansen

7 May 1994 34	1. FC Köln	2–3	Eintracht Frankfurt	Cologne, Germany
15:30 CEST	Polster 62', 66'	(Report)	Weber 24'; Gaudino 54'; Yeboah 70' (pen.)	Stadium: Müngersdorfer Stadion; Attendance: 32,000; Referee: Krug

=== DFB-Pokal ===
25 August 1993 First round	Fortuna Düsseldorf	0–2	Eintracht Frankfurt	Düsseldorf, Germany
20:00 CEST		(Report)	Binz 10'; Yeboah 75'	Stadium: Rheinstadion; Attendance: 17,000; Referee: Wippermann

11 September 1993 Second round	SC Freiburg	5–3 (a.e.t.)	Eintracht Frankfurt	Freiburg
	Rraklli 19', 102'; Freund 48', 99'; Braun 55'	(Report)	Bein 52'; Furtok 82', 87'	Stadium: Dreisamstadion; Attendance: 14,500; Referee: Albrecht

=== UEFA Cup ===
14 September 1993 First round	Dynamo Moscow	0–6	Eintracht Frankfurt	Moscow, Russia
		(Report)	Gaudino 8'; Weber 25'; Furtok 44'; Bein 47'; Okocha 80'; Yeboah 88'	Stadium: Central Dynamo Stadium; Attendance: 14,000; Referee: Beschin

28 September 1993 First round	Eintracht Frankfurt	1–2	Dynamo Moscow	Frankfurt, Germany
18:00 CEST	Furtok 65'	(Report)	Simutenkov 23'; Dobrovolski 54'	Stadium: Waldstadion; Attendance: 9,000; Referee: Benedikt

19 October 1993 Second round	Eintracht Frankfurt	2–0	Dnipro Dnipropetrovsk	Frankfurt, Germany
19:00 CEST	Furtok 65'; Okocha 78'	(Report)	Diryavka (red card) 70'	Stadium: Waldstadion; Attendance: 7,000; Referee: Encinar

3 November 1993 Second round	Dnipro Dnipropetrovsk	1–0	Eintracht Frankfurt	Dnipropetrovsk, Ukraine
16:15 CEST	Chukhleba 37'	(Report)		Stadium: Meteor Stadium; Attendance: 15,000; Referee: Ruokonen

23 November 1993 Third round	Eintracht Frankfurt	1–0	Deportivo de La Coruña	Frankfurt, Germany
20:15 CEST	Dickhaut 89'	(Report)		Stadium: Waldstadion; Attendance: 12,000; Referee: Steindl

8 December 1993 Third round	Deportivo de La Coruña	0–1	Eintracht Frankfurt	A Coruña, Spain
		(Report)	Gaudino 17'; Bindewald (red card) 74'	Stadium: Estadio Riazor; Attendance: 28,000; Referee: Röthlisberger

3 March 1994 Quarter-finals	Austria Casino Salzburg	1–0	Eintracht Frankfurt	Vienna, Austria
20:20 CEST	Hütter 33'	(Report)	Dickhaut (yellow card) 81' (yellow-red card)	Stadium: Ernst-Happel-Stadion; Attendance: 47,000; Referee: Chusainov

15 March 1994 Quarter-finals	Eintracht Frankfurt	1–0 (a.e.t.) (4–5 p)	Austria Casino Salzburg	Frankfurt, Germany
18:00 CEST	Gaudino 21'	(Report)		Stadium: Waldstadion; Attendance: 26,000; Referee: Elleray
	Penalties
	Bein (penalty scored); Reis (penalty scored); Furtok (penalty scored); Stein (penalty scored); Gaudino (penalty missed); Binz (penalty missed)		(penalty scored) Lainer; (penalty scored) Jurčević; (penalty scored) Hütter; (penalty scored) Pfeifenberger; (penalty scored) Konrad; (penalty missed) Feiersinger

== Squad ==
=== Squad and statistics ===
No.	Pos	Nat	Player	Total		Bundesliga		DFB-Pokal		UEFA Cup	
No.	Pos	Nat	Player	Apps	Goals	Apps	Goals	Apps	Goals	Apps	Goals
	GK	(Germany) GER	Thomas Ernst	4	0	4	0	0	0	0	0
	GK	(Germany) GER	Uli Stein	40	0	30	0	2	0	8	0
	DF	(Germany) GER	Uwe Bindewald	20	0	13	0	1	0	6	0
	DF	(Germany) GER	Manfred Binz	42	4	32	3	2	1	8	0
	DF	(Germany) GER	Mirko Dickhaut	38	4	32	3	0	0	6	1
	DF	(Germany) GER	~~Jochen Kientz~~	0	0	0	0	0	0	0	0
	DF	(Germany) GER	Dietmar Roth	28	0	20	0	2	0	6	0
	DF	(Georgia (country)) GEO	Kakhaber Tskhadadze	38	0	29	0	2	0	7	0
	DF	(Germany) GER	Ralf Weber	33	4	25	3	2	0	6	1
	MF	(Germany) GER	Michael Aničić	4	0	4	0	0	0	0	0
	MF	(Germany) GER	Uwe Bein	36	8	27	6	2	1	7	1
	MF	(Germany) GER	Rudi Bommer	28	1	21	1	2	0	5	0
	MF	(Germany) GER	Thomas Doll	6	1	6	1	0	0	0	0
	MF	(Germany) GER	Ralf Falkenmayer	31	1	24	1	1	0	6	0
	MF	(Germany) GER	Maurizio Gaudino	42	10	32	7	2	0	8	3
	MF	(Germany) GER	Matthias Hagner	6	0	4	0	0	0	2	0
	MF	(Federal Republic of Yugoslavia) YUG	Slobodan Komljenović	32	0	26	0	1	0	5	0
	MF	(Germany) GER	Frank Möller	5	0	2	0	0	0	3	0
	MF	(Nigeria) NGR	Jay-Jay Okocha	25	4	19	2	2	0	4	2
	MF	(Germany) GER	Thomas Reis	10	1	9	1	0	0	1	0
	MF	(Germany) GER	Dirk Wolf	2	0	2	0	0	0	0	0
	FW	(Norway) NOR	~~Jørn Andersen~~	14	2	12	2	1	0	1	0
	FW	(Germany) GER	Matthias Becker	4	1	3	1	0	0	1	0
	FW	(Poland) POL	Jan Furtok	36	11	27	6	2	2	7	3
	FW	(Federal Republic of Yugoslavia) YUG	Radmilo Mihajlović	11	0	10	0	0	0	1	0
	FW	(Ghana) GHA	Anthony Yeboah	27	20	22	18	2	1	3	1

== Sources ==
- Matheja, Ulrich (2011). Unsere Eintracht - Eintracht Frankfurt - Die Chronik. Die Werkstatt. ISBN 978-3-89533-750-5.
