= 1997–98 2. Bundesliga =

24th season of the second-tier football league in Germany

2. Bundesliga
- Season: 1997–98
- Champions: Eintracht Frankfurt
- Promoted: Eintracht Frankfurt; SC Freiburg; 1. FC Nürnberg
- Relegated: VfB Leipzig; FC Carl Zeiss Jena; FSV Zwickau; SV Meppen
- Matches played: 306
- Top goalscorer: Angelo Vier (18 goals)
- Average attendance: 9,291

The 1997–98 2. Bundesliga season was the twenty-fourth season of the 2. Bundesliga, the second tier of the German football league system.

Eintracht Frankfurt, SC Freiburg and 1. FC Nürnberg were promoted to the Bundesliga while VfB Leipzig, FC Carl Zeiss Jena, FSV Zwickau and SV Meppen were relegated to the Regionalliga.

== League table ==
For the 1997–98 season SpVgg Greuther Fürth, Energie Cottbus, SG Wattenscheid 09 and 1. FC Nürnberg were newly promoted to the 2. Bundesliga from the Regionalliga while Fortuna Düsseldorf, SC Freiburg and FC St. Pauli had been relegated to the league from the Bundesliga.

Locations of the participating teams of the 1997–98 season

Pos	Team	Pld	W	D	L	GF	GA	GD	Pts	Promotion or relegation
1	Eintracht Frankfurt (C, P)	34	17	13	4	50	32	+18	64	Promotion to Bundesliga
2	SC Freiburg (P)	34	18	7	9	57	36	+21	61	Promotion to Bundesliga
3	1. FC Nürnberg (P)	34	17	8	9	52	35	+17	59	Promotion to Bundesliga
4	FC St. Pauli	34	14	14	6	43	31	+12	56	
5	FC Gütersloh	34	13	16	5	43	26	+17	55	
6	Fortuna Köln	34	11	13	10	53	53	0	46	
7	Fortuna Düsseldorf	34	13	7	14	52	54	−2	46	
8	Energie Cottbus	34	10	15	9	38	36	+2	45	
9	SpVgg Greuther Fürth	34	11	12	11	32	32	0	45	
10	Mainz 05	34	10	14	10	55	48	+7	44	
11	SpVgg Unterhaching	34	10	14	10	41	35	+6	44	
12	Stuttgarter Kickers	34	12	8	14	44	47	−3	44	
13	KFC Uerdingen	34	11	10	13	36	40	−4	43	
14	SG Wattenscheid 09	34	10	10	14	41	41	0	40	
15	VfB Leipzig (R)	34	10	9	15	31	51	−20	39	Relegation to Regionalliga (Note: VfB Leipzig, FC Carl Zeiss Jena, and FSV Zwickau were relegated to Regionalliga Nordost. SV Meppen was relegated to Regionalliga Nord.)
16	Carl Zeiss Jena (R)	34	8	9	17	39	61	−22	33	Relegation to Regionalliga
17	FSV Zwickau (R)	34	6	10	18	32	55	−23	28	Relegation to Regionalliga
18	SV Meppen (R)	34	6	9	19	35	61	−26	27	Relegation to Regionalliga

Source: Bundesliga.de
Rules for classification: 1) points; 2) goal difference; 3) number of goals scored.
(C) Champions; (P) Promoted; (R) Relegated

== Results ==
Home \ Away	FCE	F95	SGE	SCF	SGF	FCG	JEN	FKO	LEI	M05	SVM	FCN	STP	SKI	KFC	UNT	SGW	ZWI
Energie Cottbus	—	2–1	0–1	2–1	3–0	2–2	0–0	1–1	1–1	2–2	1–0	1–1	0–0	2–1	2–2	1–0	1–2	2–1
Fortuna Düsseldorf	1–2	—	0–0	2–4	1–0	0–1	2–2	2–3	2–0	2–0	4–3	2–1	1–3	0–1	1–1	1–1	2–0	4–1
Eintracht Frankfurt	2–0	3–2	—	2–0	1–1	0–0	2–2	4–2	3–2	2–2	1–0	4–1	4–2	1–0	0–1	1–1	2–1	1–1
SC Freiburg	2–0	2–0	0–0	—	0–1	2–1	1–1	3–2	5–2	2–1	4–2	0–1	0–0	2–1	0–0	1–1	4–0	1–3
Greuther Fürth	1–0	2–2	2–1	1–1	—	0–0	3–0	0–0	3–0	2–2	2–0	0–1	0–0	1–2	3–1	0–0	0–0	1–0
FC Gütersloh	0–0	2–1	0–0	1–2	1–1	—	1–0	1–0	1–0	3–2	1–0	4–2	1–1	1–1	1–1	0–0	0–0	5–0
Carl Zeiss Jena	0–3	3–4	2–1	1–4	0–1	2–1	—	1–3	0–0	2–2	2–1	0–3	1–1	2–1	0–3	2–3	1–1	2–3
Fortuna Köln	2–0	0–3	1–2	0–2	1–1	2–2	0–3	—	2–0	2–1	2–2	0–1	1–1	2–2	2–2	2–1	3–2	5–2
VfB Leipzig	0–0	1–1	1–1	2–0	2–0	1–0	0–0	1–4	—	1–3	0–0	2–1	2–0	3–1	2–1	1–0	0–0	0–1
Mainz 05	0–0	2–0	1–1	0–1	4–1	1–1	5–0	2–2	2–1	—	3–0	2–5	0–0	3–3	2–1	1–1	1–3	2–2
SV Meppen	3–1	2–2	1–1	0–5	2–1	0–2	0–2	2–2	6–0	0–3	—	1–0	0–3	1–1	2–3	1–1	1–0	2–1
1. FC Nürnberg	3–3	0–1	0–1	4–1	0–1	1–0	1–3	1–1	3–1	1–0	4–0	—	1–0	1–0	0–0	1–0	2–2	2–0
FC St. Pauli	2–2	3–1	2–0	2–0	1–0	0–0	2–1	1–1	1–0	2–0	3–1	0–0	—	0–0	0–0	1–0	1–1	3–1
Stuttgarter Kickers	2–1	2–4	2–3	0–1	1–0	0–2	2–1	1–1	2–3	1–2	2–1	1–1	3–1	—	2–2	2–3	2–0	1–0
KFC Uerdingen	2–1	0–1	0–1	1–0	2–0	0–3	2–0	2–0	0–1	0–1	2–0	0–3	0–2	0–2	—	2–2	2–1	2–2
SpVgg Unterhaching	0–0	3–1	1–2	1–1	0–1	1–1	3–0	0–1	1–1	3–2	1–0	2–2	1–4	2–0	2–0	—	0–0	2–0
SG Wattenscheid	0–2	4–0	0–1	1–4	2–1	1–2	2–0	4–2	4–0	1–1	1–1	0–1	4–1	0–1	0–1	2–0	—	2–1
FSV Zwickau	0–0	0–1	1–1	0–1	1–1	2–2	0–3	0–1	2–0	0–0	0–0	2–3	4–0	0–1	1–0	0–4	0–0	—

Source: DFB
Legend: Blue = home team win; Yellow = draw; Red = away team win.

== Top scorers ==
The league's top scorers:

Goals	Player	Team
18	(Germany) Angelo Vier	FC Gütersloh
16	(Germany) Marco Weißhaupt	SC Freiburg
15	(Germany) Sven Demandt	1. FSV Mainz 05
15	(Germany) Marcus Feinbier	SG Wattenscheid 09
15	(Germany) Rainer Krieg	Fortuna Köln
13	(Germany) Daniel Stendel	SV Meppen
13	(Albania) Igli Tare	Fortuna Düsseldorf
12	(Germany) Markus Beierle	Stuttgarter Kickers
11	(Germany) Michael Wiesinger	1. FC Nürnberg
10	(Germany) Steffen Heidrich	VfB Leipzig
10	(Germany) Adnan Kevric	Stuttgarter Kickers
10	(Morocco) Abderrahim Ouakili	1. FSV Mainz 05
10	(Germany) Thomas Sobotzik	Eintracht Frankfurt
