= AS Cannes in European football =

French club in European football

- Club: AS Cannes
- First entry: 1991–92 UEFA Cup
- Latest entry: 1994–95 UEFA Cup

Titles
- Champions League: 0
- Europa League: 0
- Cup Winners' Cup: 0
- Super Cup: 0

This article lists results for French association football team AS Cannes in European competition.

== Participations ==
As of 4 December 2012, Cannes have competed in:

- 2 participations in the UEFA Cup / UEFA Europa League

=== Record by competition ===
As of 4 December 2012

| Competition | Played | Won | Drawn | Lost | Goals for | Goals against |
|---|---|---|---|---|---|---|
| UEFA Europa League | 8 | 3 | 2 | 3 | 14 | 9 |
| Total | 8 | 3 | 2 | 3 | 14 | 9 |

== Matches in Europe ==
| Season | Competition | Round | Country | Club | Score |
|---|---|---|---|---|---|
| 1991–92 | UEFA Cup | First round | POR | Salgueiros | 0-1 (A), 1-0 (H) |
| 1991–92 | UEFA Cup | Second round | SOV | Dynamo Moscow | 0-1 (H), 1-1 (A) |
| 1994–95 | UEFA Cup | First round | TUR | Fenerbahçe | 4-0 (H), 5-1 (A) |
| 1994–95 | UEFA Cup | Second round | AUT | Wacker Wien | 1-1 (A), 2-4 (H) |
