= Jörg Schmidt (footballer) =

German footballer

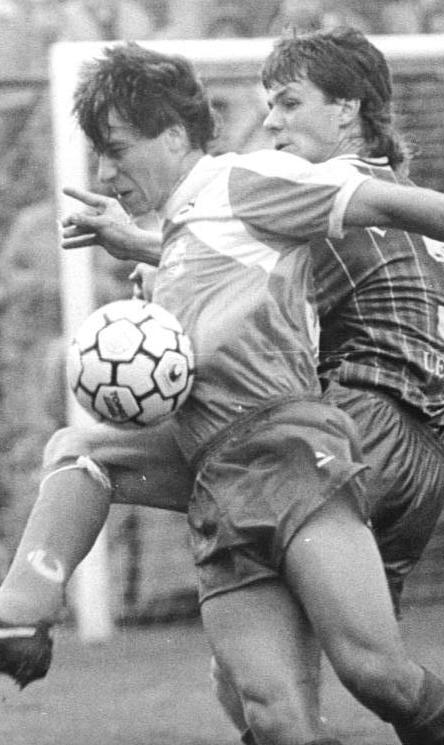
- Jörg Schmidt (left) with Holm Pinder (right) in 1990

Personal information
- Date of birth: 20 December 1970 (age 55)
- Place of birth: East Germany
- Height: 1.70 m (5 ft 7 in)
- Position: Right midfielder

Youth career
- –1982: BSG Robotron Sömmerda
- 1982–1988: Rot-Weiß Erfurt

Senior career*
Years	Team	Apps	(Gls)
1988–1992	Rot-Weiß Erfurt	65	(10)
1992–1993	Hansa Rostock	25	(2)
1993–1995	FC Homburg	28	(1)
1995–1997	Dynamo Dresden	47	(9)
1997	Rot-Weiß Erfurt	14	(3)
1997–2000	Chemnitzer FC	69	(11)
2000	VFC Plauen	13	(1)
2000–2001	Debreceni VSC	14	(2)
2001–2003	FSV Zwickau	39	(3)
2003–2004	Fortuna Furth Glösa		
- * Club domestic league appearances and goals

Jörg Schmidt (born 20 December 1970) is a German former professional footballer who played as a right midfielder.
