= Brian Kaus =

Danish footballer (born 1967)

Personal information
- Full name: Brian Normann Kaus
- Date of birth: 5 July 1967 (age 59)
- Place of birth: Denmark
- Positions: Defender; midfielder

Senior career*
Years	Team	Apps	(Gls)
- Brønshøj Boldklub
-1992	Boldklubben 1903	42+	(1+)
1992-1994	F.C. Copenhagen	51	(8)
1994-1995/96	Lyngby Boldklub	40	(3)
1995/96-2003/04	Brønshøj Boldklub		

International career
1993	Denmark	1	(0)
- * Club domestic league appearances and goals

Brian Normann Kaus (born 5 July 1967) in is a Danish retired footballer.

== Career ==
At the age of 17, Kaus debuted for Brønshøj Boldklub in the Danish top flight after scoring 27 goals for the youth team.

In 1992, he signed for newly formed Copenhagen where he peaked as a player, helping them win the league on their first season. Copenhagen went on to become Denmark's most successful club.

In 1993, Kaus made his solitary appearance for the Denmark national team against the United States.

For the second half of 1995/96, he returned to Brønshøj Boldklub, staying there until 2003/04.

Kaus is Brønshøj Boldklub's top appearance-maker of all time, with 250 appearances.
