= Jørgen Juul Jensen =

Danish footballer (born 1965)

Personal information
- Date of birth: 17 November 1965 (age 60)
- Place of birth: Rødovre, Denmark
- Height: 1.91 m (6 ft 3 in)
- Position: Midfielder

Senior career*
Years	Team	Apps	(Gls)
1985–1992	B 1903		
1992–1993	F.C. Copenhagen		
1994–1995	Næstved IF		
1995–1996	Lyngby FC		

International career
1990	Denmark	1	(0)
- * Club domestic league appearances and goals

Jørgen Juul Jensen (born 17 November 1965) is a Danish former footballer who played as a midfielder. He made one appearances for the Denmark national team in 1990.
