= Fuji-Cup =

The Fuji-Cup (played in 1986 as the Casio-Cup) was an unofficial preparatory German football tournament held from 1986 to 1996 in the summer break immediately before the start of the Bundesliga season in smaller towns in the "Football Province". The competition, which consisted of two semi-finals followed by a match for 3rd place and a final, featured the four leading teams from the previous Bundesliga season.

Also before the start of the new Bundesliga season, the official DFB-Supercup was played between the Bundesliga winners and the DFB-Pokal winners of the previous season. Since the Fuji-Cup advanced over time into a dimension that the official DFB-Supercup of the DFB had not yet reached, the DFB initially introduced a clause that stipulated that DFB-Pokal winners and Bundesliga winners would not be invited to the Fuji-Cup tournament at the same time in order to avoid an early DFB-Supercup match.

For the 1997 season, the Fuji-Cup and DFB-Supercup were finally replaced by the newly created and official DFB-Ligapokal, which was played until 2007. Since 2009, the Telekom Cup (2009 as the T-Home Cup, 2010–2012 as the LIGA total! Cup), which is also unofficial, has been held as a similar tournament to Fuji-Cup.

The record winner is FC Bayern Munich with a total of five victories in the Casio-Cup and Fuji-Cup.

== Namesake ==
The tournaments were supported by large and well-known manufacturers of technology from Japan at the time, namely (once) Casio and Fuji.

== Winners ==
Casio-Cup 1986

Semifinals
Borussia Mönchengladbach	2
FC Bayern Munich	5
SV Werder Bremen	4
Hamburger SV	0

Final (in Mönchengladbach)
SV Werder Bremen	2 (3)
FC Bayern Munich	2 (4)
Third Place
Borussia Mönchengladbach	2
Hamburger SV	0

Fuji-Cup 1987

Semifinals
1. FC Köln	1
FC Bayern Munich	2
1. FC Kaiserslautern	2
Hamburger SV	3

Final (in Kaiserslautern)
FC Bayern Munich	5
Hamburger SV	1
Third Place
1. FC Köln	3
1. FC Kaiserslautern	1

Fuji-Cup 1988

Semifinals
1. FC Nürnberg	0
FC Bayern Munich	2
Borussia Mönchengladbach	2 (5)
SV Werder Bremen	2 (4)

Final (in Augsburg)
FC Bayern Munich	3
Borussia Mönchengladbach	0
Third Place
1. FC Nürnberg	1 (4)
SV Werder Bremen	1 (2)

Fuji-Cup 1989

Semifinals
VfB Stuttgart	1 (4)
FC Bayern Munich	1 (3)
1. FC Köln	1
SV Werder Bremen	3

Final(in Würzburg)
VfB Stuttgart	1 (5)
SV Werder Bremen	1 (3)
Third Place
FC Bayern Munich	2
1. FC Köln	0

Fuji-Cup 1990

Semifinals
Borussia Dortmund	0 (6)
FC Bayern Munich	0 (4)
SV Werder Bremen	2
1. FC Köln	0

Final (in Lüdenscheid)
SV Werder Bremen	0 (6)
BV Borussia Dortmund	0 (5)
Third Place
FC Bayern Munich	4
1. FC Köln	1

Fuji-Cup 1991

Semifinals
BV Borussia Dortmund	2
FC Bayern Munich	0
1. FC Kaiserslautern	1
SV Werder Bremen	2

Final (in Passau)
BV Borussia Dortmund	4
SV Werder Bremen	1
Third Place
FC Bayern Munich	2 (5)
1. FC Kaiserslautern	2 (3)

Fuji-Cup 1992

Semifinals
1. FC Kaiserslautern	1 (5)
BV Borussia Dortmund	1 (4)
SG Eintracht Frankfurt	2
VfB Stuttgart	0

Final (in Trier)
SG Eintracht Frankfurt	1 (5)
1. FC Kaiserslautern	1 (3)
Third Place
BV Borussia Dortmund	2
VfB Stuttgart	0

Fuji-Cup 1993

Semifinals
BV Borussia Dortmund	0 (5)
SG Eintracht Frankfurt	0 (4)
FC Bayern Munich	2
SV Werder Bremen	1

Final (in Koblenz)
BV Borussia Dortmund	3
FC Bayern Munich	2
Third Place
SV Werder Bremen	3
SG Eintracht Frankfurt	1

Fuji-Cup 1994

Semifinals
SG Eintracht Frankfurt	1
BV Borussia Dortmund	0
FC Bayern Munich	1
VfB Stuttgart	0

Final (in Koblenz)
FC Bayern Munich	0 (5)
SG Eintracht Frankfurt	0 (4)
Third Place
BV Borussia Dortmund	1 (5)
VfB Stuttgart	1 (3)

Fuji-Cup 1995

Semifinals
BV Borussia Dortmund	3
1. FC Kaiserslautern	0
FC Bayern Munich	1 (7)
SV Werder Bremen	1 (6)

Final (in Koblenz)
FC Bayern Munich	3
BV Borussia Dortmund	2
Third Place
1. FC Kaiserslautern	2
SV Werder Bremen	1

Fuji-Cup 1996

Semifinals
FC Schalke 04	3
BV Borussia Dortmund	1
FC Bayern Munich	4
Borussia Mönchengladbach	0

Final (in Koblenz)
FC Schalke 04	2 (4)
FC Bayern Munich	2 (3)
Third Place
Borussia Mönchengladbach	1
BV Borussia Dortmund	0

== Championships by team ==
Team	First place	Second place	Third place	Fourth Place
FC Bayern Munich	1986, 1987, 1988, 1994, 1995	1993, 1996	1989, 1990, 1991	-
Borussia Dortmund	1991, 1993	1990, 1995	1992, 1994	1996
SV Werder Bremen	1990	1986, 1989, 1991	1993	1988, 1995
Eintracht Frankfurt	1992	1994		1993
VfB Stuttgart	1989	-	-	1992, 1994
Schalke 04	1996	-	-	-
1. FC Kaiserslautern	-	1992	1995	1987, 1991
Borussia Mönchengladbach	-	1988	1986, 1996	-
Hamburger SV	-	1987	-	1986
1. FC Köln	-	-	1987	1989, 1990
1. FC Nürnberg	-	-	1988	-
