= Ove Hansen (footballer, born 1966) =

Danish footballer (born 1966)

Personal information
- Date of birth: 9 April 1966 (age 60)
- Place of birth: Denmark
- Position: Striker

Senior career*
Years	Team	Apps	(Gls)
–1985	BK Herning Fremad		
1985–1994	Ikast FS	65	(28)
1995	OB	7	(1)
1995–1996	Ikast FS	23	(2)
1997–1998	SV Ried	39	(6)
1998–1999	Aarhus Fremad	23	(4)
1999–2000	Holstebro Boldklub		
- * Club domestic league appearances and goals

Ove Hansen (born 9 April 1966) is a Danish former footballer who played as a striker.

== Early life ==
Hansen was born in 1966 in Denmark. He was nicknamed "Turbo".

== Career ==
Hansen started his career with Danish side BK Herning Fremad. In 1985, he signed for Danish side Ikast FC. In 1995, he signed for Danish side Odense Boldklub. In 1995, he returned to Danish side Ikast FC. In 1997, he signed for Austrian side SV Ried. In 1998, he signed for Danish side Aarhus Fremad. In 1999, he signed for Danish side Holstebro Boldklub.

== Style of play ==
Hansen mainly operated as a striker. He was known for his speed.

== Personal life ==
Hansen has been married. He is the father of Danish sprinter Simon Hansen.
