= Sead Mehić =

Bosnian-Herzegovinian former footballer (born 1975)

Personal information
- Date of birth: 8 April 1975 (age 51)
- Place of birth: Bijeljina, SFR Yugoslavia
- Height: 1.78 m (5 ft 10 in)
- Positions: Attacking midfielder; striker

Youth career
- Partizan Belgrade
- VfB Friedberg
- –1996: Germania Ockstadt
- 1996–1997: KSV Klein-Karben

Senior career*
Years	Team	Apps	(Gls)
1997–1998	Eintracht Frankfurt	16	(0)
1998–1999	SV Meppen	31	(5)
1999–2004	SV Wehen	151	(27)
2004–2005	1. FC Eschborn	34	(10)
2005–2006	Rot-Weiß Oberhausen	31	(6)
2006–2010	FSV Frankfurt	113	(17)
2010–2013	Kickers Offenbach	93	(5)
Total		489	(70)

Managerial career
- 2014–2017: SG Bad Soden
- * Club domestic league appearances and goals

Sead Mehić (born 8 April 1975) is a Bosnian-Herzegovinian former footballer.

== Career ==
On 17 May 2010, Mehić left FSV Frankfurt of the 2. Bundesliga and signed with 3. Liga club Kickers Offenbach.
