= Hakan Cengiz =

German footballer (born 1967)

Personal information
- Date of birth: 3 October 1967 (age 59)
- Place of birth: Ankara, Turkey
- Height: 1.82 m (6 ft 0 in)
- Position: Forward

Team information
- Current team: TV Jahn Delmenhorst (youth)

Youth career
- –1989: Leher TS Bremerhaven

Senior career*
Years	Team	Apps	(Gls)
1989–1993	FC Bremerhaven		
1993–1996	Atlas Delmenhorst		
1996–1997	VfL Herzlake	32	(28)
1997–1998	Eintracht Frankfurt	11	(0)
1998	Waldhof Mannheim	5	(4)
1998–1999	Kickers Emden	29	(12)
1999–2002	SV Wilhelmshaven	67	(32)
2002–2004	VfB Oldenburg	59	(36)
2006–2009	RW Hürriyet		
2009–2010	BW Bümmerstede		
2010–2011	RW Hürriyet		
2011–2013	VfR Wardenburg		
2013	Atlas Delmenhorst		

Managerial career
- 2006–2009: RW Hürriyet (player-coach)
- 2009–2010: BW Bümmerstede (player-coach)
- 2010–2011: RW Hürriyet (player-coach)
- 2013–: TV Jahn Delmenhorst (youth)
- * Club domestic league appearances and goals

Hakan Cengiz (born 10 October 1967) is a Turkish football coach and former professional player.
