= Dirk Wolf =

German footballer

Personal information
- Date of birth: 4 August 1972 (age 54)
- Place of birth: Marburg, West Germany
- Height: 1.82 m (6 ft 0 in)
- Position: Midfielder

Senior career*
Years	Team	Apps	(Gls)
1991–1995	Eintracht Frankfurt	34	(0)
1995–1997	Borussia Mönchengladbach	15	(0)
1997–1998	Eintracht Frankfurt	26	(3)
1998–2000	FC St. Pauli	47	(1)
2002–2003	FSV Frankfurt		
2003–2006	Darmstadt 98	50	(3)
2006–2007	1. FC Germania 08 Ober-Roden		
Total		172	(7)

International career
1992	Germany U21	2	(0)

Managerial career
- 2007: 1. FC Germania 08 Ober-Roden
- * Club domestic league appearances and goals

Dirk Wolf (born 4 August 1972) is a German former professional footballer who played as a midfielder. Wolf is best known for playing in the Bundesliga with Eintracht Frankfurt and Borussia Mönchengladbach. Since his retirement, he has held coaching and managerial jobs at 1. FC Germania 08 Ober-Roden and TS Ober-Roden.
