= Holm Pinder =

German footballer and manager

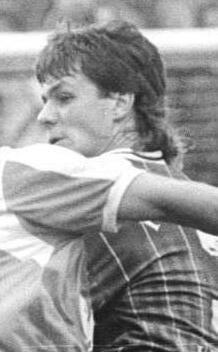
- Pinder in 1990

Personal information
- Date of birth: 21 March 1971 (age 55)
- Place of birth: Leipzig, East Germany
- Height: 1.86 m (6 ft 1 in)
- Position: Central defender

Youth career
- –1990: Chemie Leipzig

Senior career*
Years	Team	Apps	(Gls)
1990–1994	FC Sachsen Leipzig		
1994–1997	VfB Leipzig	70	(2)
1997–2000	FSV Zwickau	64	(1)
2000–2002	VfB Leipzig		
2002–2007	ZFC Meuselwitz		
2007–2008	SV Schmölln 1913		
2008	ZFC Meuselwitz	1	(0)

Managerial career
- 2008–2009: ZFC Meuselwitz II
- 2009–2011: ZFC Meuselwitz U-19
- 2011–2014: ZFC Meuselwitz
- * Club domestic league appearances and goals

Holm Pinder (born 21 March 1971) is a German former footballer and current manager.
