= Milan Kerbr =

Czech footballer

Personal information
- Date of birth: 9 June 1967 (age 59)
- Place of birth: Uherské Hradiště, Czechoslovakia
- Height: 1.85 m (6 ft 1 in)
- Position: Striker

Youth career
- 1974–1976: TJ Jiskra Staré Město
- 1976–1987: Uherské Hradiště

Senior career*
Years	Team	Apps	(Gls)
1987–1989	VTJ Tachov		
1989–1991	Svit Zlín		
1991–1997	Sigma Olomouc	151	(35)
1997–1999	Greuther Fürth	40	(5)
1999	SC Weismain	14	(4)
1999–2001	SSV Reutlingen	25	(5)

International career
1992	Czechoslovakia B	1	(0)
1996	Czech Republic	2	(0)
Medal record
Men's football
Representing Czech Republic
UEFA European Championship
Runner-up	1996 England
- * Club domestic league appearances and goals

Milan Kerbr (born 9 June 1967 in Uherské Hradiště) is a Czech former professional footballer who played as a forward for the Czech Republic, for whom he was part of the squad UEFA Euro 1996. He played club football in his home country for Sigma Olomouc before moving to Germany at the age of 30, and playing there for various clubs until retiring in 2001.

== Club career ==
At club level, Kerbr made 151 league appearances in the Czechoslovak and later, Czech First League for Sigma Olomouc between 1991 and 1997, scoring 35 goals. In a March 1992 UEFA Cup match against Spanish side Real Madrid, Kerbr hit the post with a header, his team narrowly losing 1–0 on the night and 2–1 on aggregate. During his time at Olomouc he became the club's leading scorer in European competitions, having scored six times in the UEFA Cup.

At the age of 30, Kerbr moved to Germany, where he played in the second-tier 2. Bundesliga. In Germany he played for Greuther Fürth, SC Weismain, and then SSV Reutlingen, where he finished his playing career in 2002.

== International career ==
In 1992, Kerbr made an appearance for Czechoslovakia B. He played two matches for the Czech Republic in 1996, making his debut in April against the Republic of Ireland, before playing his second and final game for the national team against Austria the following month. He was a part of the Czech Republic national team squad at UEFA Euro 1996, but did not play in the tournament.

Following his football career, Kerbr worked as a football coach in Germany's Regionalliga. His son, also called Milan, played in the Czech First League for Slovácko.
