= Marcus Feinbier =

German footballer (born 1969)

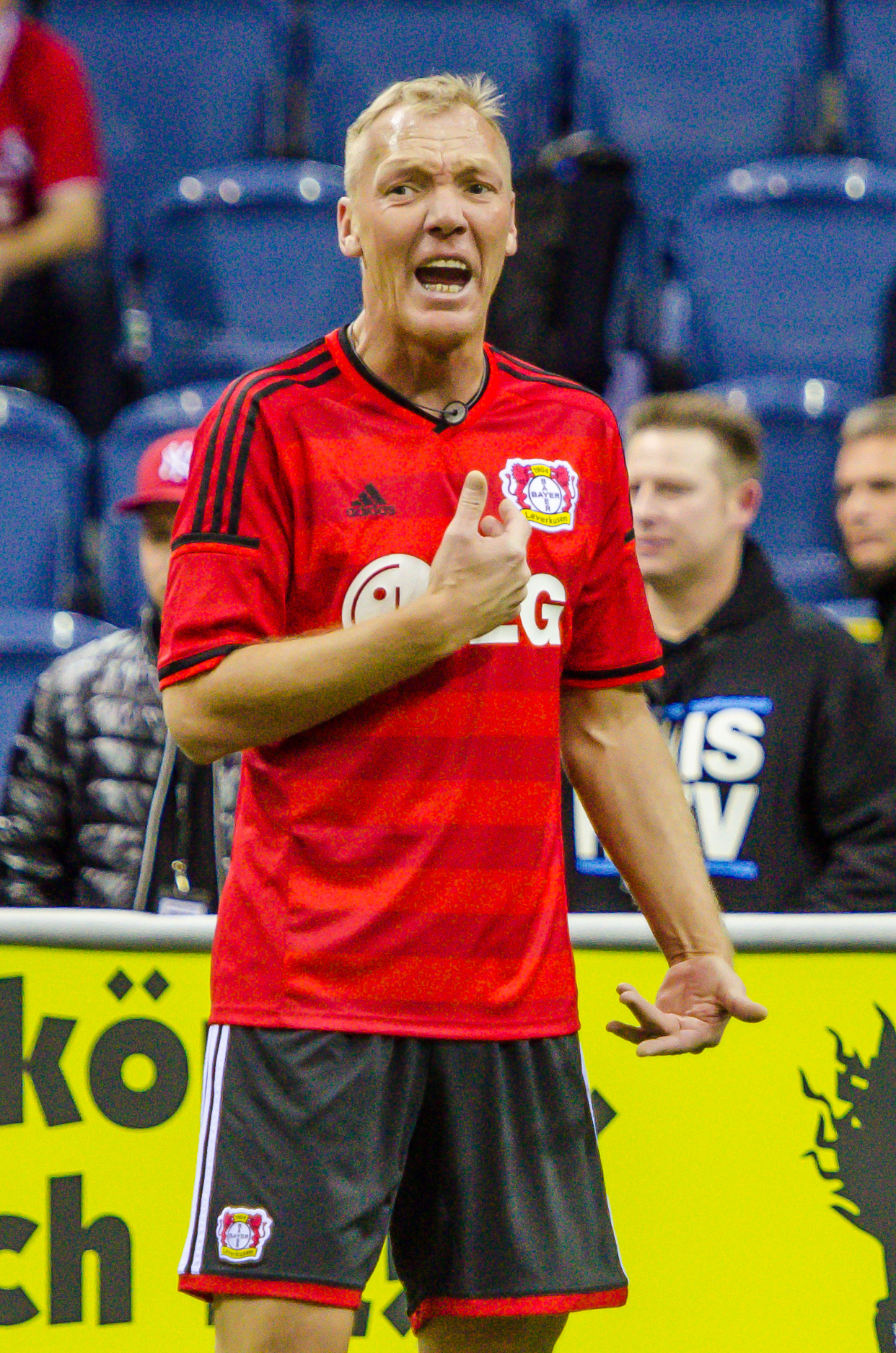
- Feinbier in 2015

Personal information
- Date of birth: 30 November 1969 (age 56)
- Place of birth: West Berlin, West Germany
- Height: 1.83 m (6 ft 0 in)
- Position: Striker

Team information
- Current team: FC Leverkusen (head of youth)

Youth career
- 1975–1981: Hertha Zehlendorf
- 1981–1982: Berliner SV
- 1982–1986: Hertha Zehlendorf
- 1986–1987: Bayer 04 Leverkusen

Senior career*
| Years | Team | Apps | (Gls) |
| 1987–1992 | Bayer 04 Leverkusen | 69 | (3) |
| 1992–1993 | Hertha BSC | 26 | (3) |
| 1993–1994 | Wuppertaler SV | 22 | (2) |
| 1994–1996 | Alemannia Aachen | 62 | (39) |
| 1997–1999 | SG Wattenscheid 09 | 63 | (22) |
| 1999–2000 | 1. FC Nürnberg | 16 | (2) |
| 2000–2003 | LR Ahlen | 85 | (39) |
| 2003–2005 | SpVgg Greuther Fürth | 62 | (22) |
| 2005–2007 | Fortuna Düsseldorf | 53 | (24) |
| 2007–2008 | SV Elversberg | 33 | (9) |
| Total | | 491 | (165) |

International career
| 1989 | West Germany U-21 | 1 | (0) |
| 1990 | Germany Olympic | 1 | (0) |

Managerial career
- 2012–2013: BV Burscheid
- 2013–2015: FC Leverkusen
- * Club domestic league appearances and goals

Marcus Feinbier (born 30 November 1969) is a retired German football player. He is currently working as a leader of the youth department at FC Leverkusen.

Feinbier played at senior level for 10 different clubs in 21 seasons in the first three levels of the (West) German football league system.

== Honours ==
- UEFA Cup winner: 1987–88
