= Thomas Sobotzik =

German footballer (born 1974)

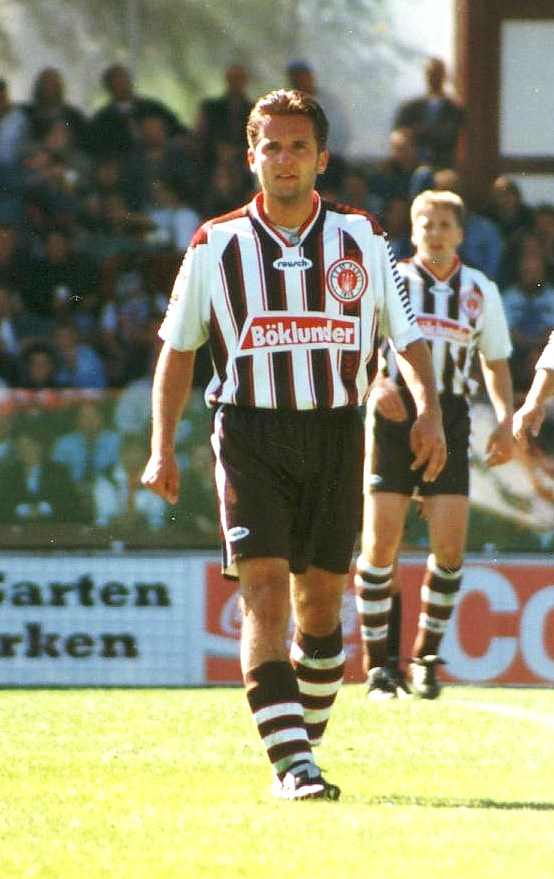
- Sobotzik with FC St. Pauli in the 1996–97 season

Personal information
- Date of birth: 16 October 1974 (age 52)
- Place of birth: Gliwice, Poland
- Height: 1.78 m (5 ft 10 in)
- Position: Midfielder

Team information
- Current team: Kickers Offenbach (Managing director)

Youth career
- 1980–1983: Piast Gliwice
- 1983–1987: Górnik Zabrze
- 1988: Eintracht Frankfurt
- 1989–1990: VfB Stuttgart
- 1990–1994: Eintracht Frankfurt

Senior career*
| Years | Team | Apps | (Gls) |
| 1994–1995 | Eintracht Frankfurt | 2 | (0) |
| 1995–1997 | FC St. Pauli | 65 | (7) |
| 1997–1999 | Eintracht Frankfurt | 62 | (17) |
| 1999 | 1. FC Kaiserslautern | 3 | (0) |
| 1999–2001 | Eintracht Frankfurt | 34 | (5) |
| 2001–2003 | Rapid Wien | 49 | (8) |
| 2003–2004 | Union Berlin | 29 | (7) |
| 2004–2007 | SpVgg Unterhaching | 70 | (0) |
| 2007 | Sandefjord Fotball | 12 | (1) |
| 2008–2009 | FSV Frankfurt | 9 | (1) |
| 2009–2011 | 1. FC Oberstedten | | |
- * Club domestic league appearances and goals

Thomas Sobotzik (Polish: Tomasz Sobocki; born 16 October 1974) is a German former professional footballer who played as a midfielder. He is the managing director of Kickers Offenbach.

== Playing career ==
Sobotzik was born in Gliwice, Poland. He started his footballing career at local club Pogon Zabrze. When he was nine years old, he moved to Górnik Zabrze. In 1987 the Sobotzik family moved to Frankfurt, Germany. He joined the youth department of Eintracht Frankfurt and played for their U-15. At a youth tournament in Aalen he received an offer from VfB Stuttgart. During his stint at VfB Stuttgart he became twice German junior champion and returned to Frankfurt in 1990. At the age of 17 he signed at professional contract. Due to a heavy knee injury he had to pause a long time in 1991.

With 20 years he finally debuted in the Bundesliga. After two seasons at FC St. Pauli a short stint at Kaiserslautern he returned both times to Eintracht. In 2001 Lothar Matthäus signed him for Rapid Wien. Via Union Berlin he came to SpVgg Unterhaching in 2004 where he captained the side in his last season at the Bavarian club.

In 2007, he moved to Norwegian side Sandefjord Fotball. In January 2008, moved to German Regionalliga team FSV Frankfurt agreeing a 1 1/2-year contract until summer 2009. Upon expiration of his contract he was released by FSV Frankfurt and joined lower league side 1. FC Oberstedten, where he ended his active career there until the summer of 2011.

Sobotzik appeared in 134 Bundesliga (19 goals) and in 110 2nd Bundesliga (17 goals) matches.

== Coaching and managerial career ==
Sobotzik began his coaching career in 2008 as assistant coach of the U-17 team of a lower league side, 1. FC Oberstedten.

In May 2018, Sobotzik was appointed sporting director and responsible for the commercial area at Chemnitzer FC. In early September 2019, he resigned. Sobotzik later explained his resignation with following word: The last personal hostilities, insults and threats I had to experience and suffer go far beyond what is manageable. In November 2019, he was appointed managing director of the sporting area of Kickers Offenbach. After the end of the regional league season and the victory of the Hessenpokal, the club separated from him in May 2022. On 1 April 2023, Sobotzik took over the post of sports director at third-division club Hallescher FC.

== Post-playing career ==
Sobotzik built up a personnel services company and was also involved in transfers of footballers in Poland and Scandinavia. In 2015 he sold his shares in the company.
