= List of people from Frankfurt =

This list contains notable people both born in Frankfurt and residents of the city, ordered chronologically.

== Born in Frankfurt ==
=== 9th to 17th centuries ===
- Charles the Bald (823–877), King of West Francia, King of Italy and Holy Roman Emperor
- William I, Duke of Bavaria (1330–1389), also known as William V, Count of Holland, as William III, Count of Hainaut and as William IV, Count of Zeeland
- Jakob Heller (c. 1460—1522), patrician, politician, and merchant
- Johann Dietenberger (c. 1475–1537), Catholic Scholastic theologian
- Konrad Gobel (c. 1498–1557), craftsman of bells and other metal castings
- Sebastian von Heusenstamm (1508–1555), Archbishop-Elector of Mainz
- Elijah Loans (1555–1636), rabbi and Kabbalist
- Philipp Uffenbach (1566–1636), painter and etcher
- Adam Elsheimer (1578–1610), artist
- Hendrik van Steenwijk II (c.1580–1649), Baroque painter
- Lucas Jennis (1590–1630), engraver
- Joachim von Sandrart (1606–1688), Baroque art-historian and painter
- Johannes Lingelbach (1622–1674), Dutch Golden Age painter
- Jacob von Sandrart (1630–1708), engraver
- Abraham Mignon (1640–1679), Dutch golden age painter
- Johann Jacob Schütz (1640–1690), lawyer and hymnwriter
- Philipp von Hörnigk (1640–1714), civil servant and supporter of the economic theory of mercantilism
- Maria Sibylla Merian (1647–1717), naturalist and scientific illustrator
- Philipp Peter Roos (1655–1706), Baroque painter
- Jacob Christoph Le Blon (1667–1741), painter and engraver
- Lorenz Heister (1683–1758), anatomist, surgeon and botanist

=== 18th century ===
- Alexander Ferdinand (1704–1773), 3rd Prince of Thurn and Taxis, Postmaster General of the Imperial Reichspost, and Head of the Princely House of Thurn and Taxis
- Princess Marie Auguste of Thurn and Taxis (1706–1756), Regent of Württemberg
- Johann Christian Senckenberg (1707–1772), physician, naturalist and collector
- Susanne von Klettenberg (1723–1774), abbess and writer
- Louis Eugene (1731–1795), Duke of Württemberg
- Catharina Elisabeth Goethe (1731–1808), mother of Johann Wolfgang von Goethe
- Karl Anselm (1733–1805), 4th Prince of Thurn and Taxis, Postmaster General of the Imperial Reichspost, and Head of the Princely House of Thurn and Taxis
- Johann Zoffany (1733–1810), neoclassical painter
- Georg Melchior Kraus (1737–1806), painter
- Nathan Adler (1741–1800), kabbalist and rabbi
- Mayer Amschel Rothschild (1744–1812), banker and founder of the Rothschild banking dynasty

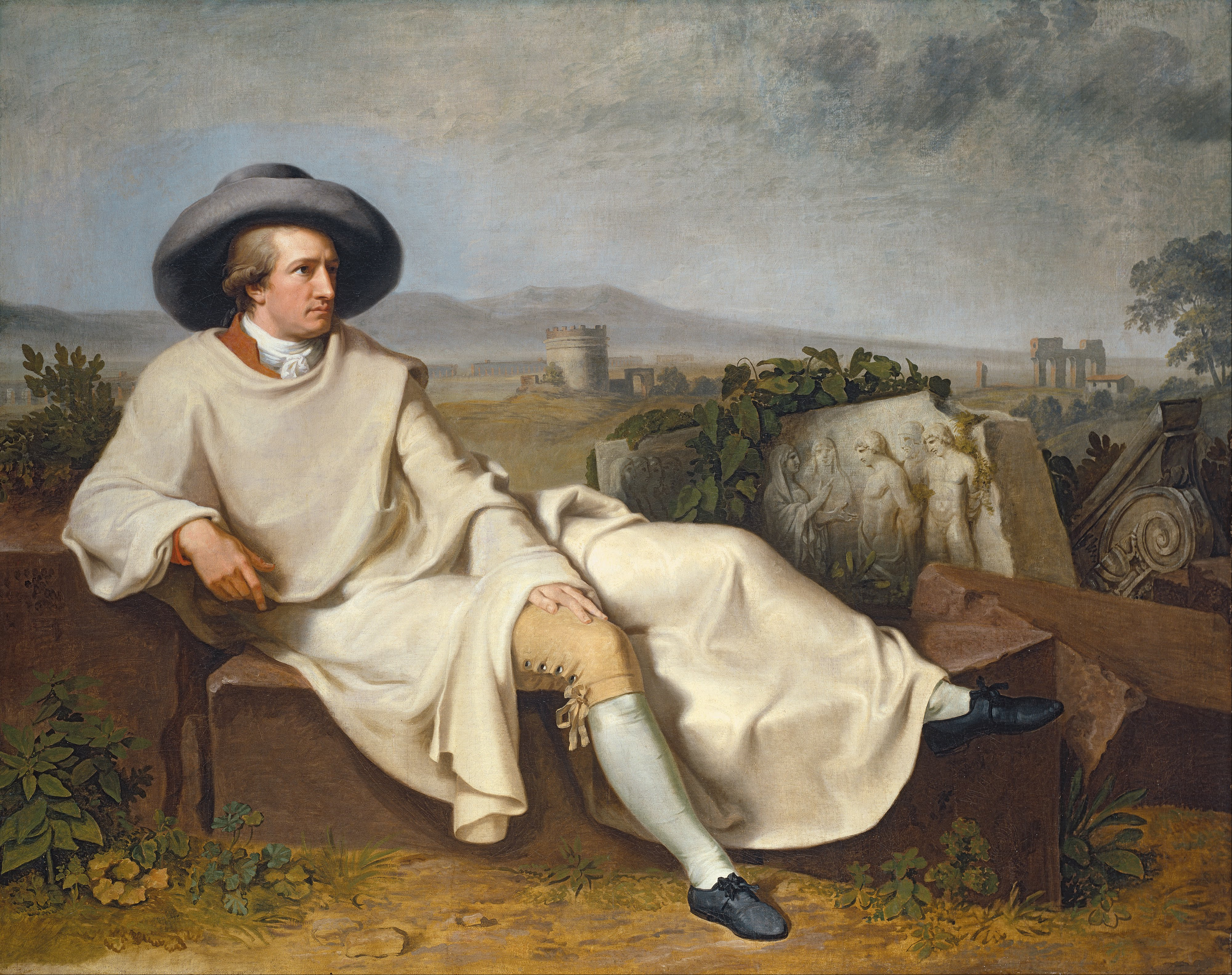
Johann Wolfgang von Goethe

- Johann Wolfgang von Goethe (1749–1832), writer and statesman
- Cornelia Schlosser (1750–1777), sister of Johann Wolfgang von Goethe
- Princess Charlotte of Saxe-Meiningen (1751–1827), Princess of Saxe-Meiningen and Duchess consort of Saxe-Gotha-Altenburg
- Princess Louise of Saxe-Meiningen (1752–1805), Duchess of Saxe-Meiningen
- Abraham Bing (1752–1841), rabbi
- Friedrich Maximilian Klinger (1752–1831), dramatist and novelist
- Johann Philipp Gabler (1753–1826), Protestant Christian theologian

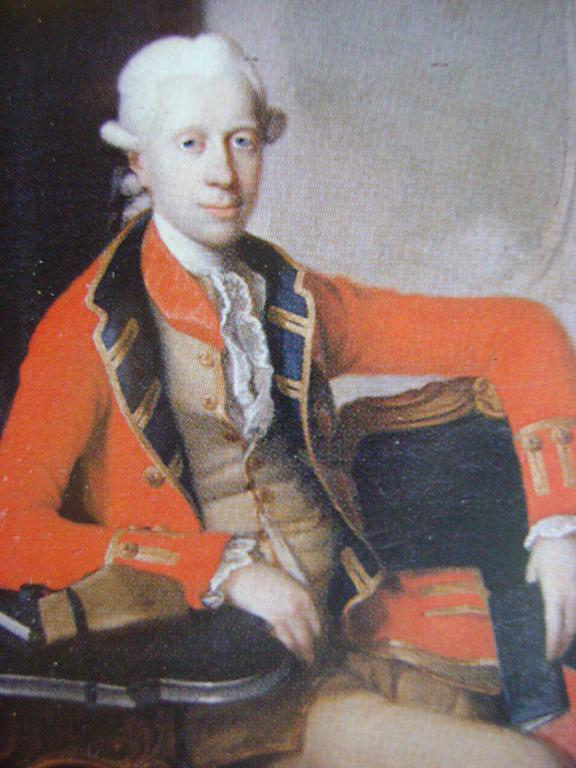
Karl Wilhelm, Duke of Saxe-Meiningen

- Karl Wilhelm (1754–1782), Duke of Saxe-Meiningen

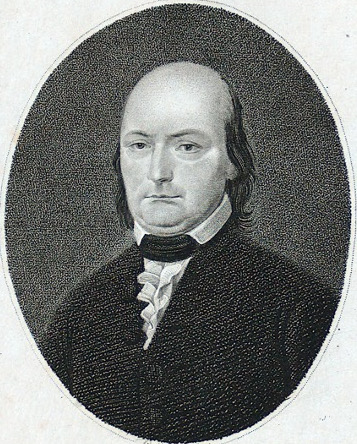
Anton Dereser

- Anton Dereser (1757–1827), Discalced Carmelite professor of hermeneutics and Oriental languages
- Georg I (1761–1803), Duke of Saxe-Meiningen
- Moses Sofer (1762–1839), rabbi
- Philipp Karl Buttmann (1764–1829), philologist of French Huguenot ancestry
- Margarethe Danzi (1768–1800), composer and soprano
- Johann Friedrich von Meyer (1772–1849), senator of Frankfurt
- Amschel Mayer von Rothschild (1773–1855), banker of the Rothschild family financial dynasty
- Salomon Rothschild (1774–1855), banker in the Austrian Empire and founder of the Austrian branch of the Mayer Amschel Rothschild family
- Elisabeth von Adlerflycht (1775–1846), painter
- Nathan Mayer Rothschild (1777–1836), London-based banker and financier and one of five sons of the second generation of the Rothschild banking dynasty
- Friedrich Carl von Savigny (1779–1861), jurist and historian
- Johann Friedrich Heinrich Schlosser (1780–1851), jurist, writer and translator
- Dorothea von Ertmann (1781–1849), pianist
- Jeanette Wohl (1783–1961), friend and correspondent of Ludwig Börne
- Christian Brentano (1784–1851), writer and Catholic publicist
- Bettina von Arnim (1785–1859), writer and novelist
- Ludwig Börne (1786–1837), political writer and satirist
- Johann David Passavant (1787–1861), painter, curator and artist
- Franz Pforr (1788–1812), painter
- Carl Mayer von Rothschild (1788–1855), banker in the Kingdom of the Two Sicilies and founder of the Rothschild banking family of Naples
- Jakob Alt (1789–1872), painter and lithographer
- James Mayer de Rothschild (1792–1868 ), banker and founder of the French branch of the Rothschild family
- Carl von Heyden (1793–1866), senator and entomologist
- Eduard Rüppell (1794–1884), naturalist and explorer
- August von Bethmann-Hollweg (1795–1877), jurist and politician
- Johann Friedrich Böhmer (1795–1863), historian
- Heinrich Christian Macklot (1799–1832), naturalist
- Ferdinand Fellner (1799–1859), painter
- Friedrich Wöhler (1800–1882), chemist

=== 19th century ===
==== 1801–1820 ====
- Joseph Aschbach (1801–1882), historian
- Ferdinand Lindheimer (1801–1879), German Texan botanist
- Hermann von Meyer (1801–1869), palaeontologist

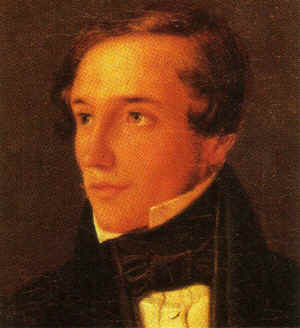
Heinrich Hoffmann

- Frédéric Jules Sichel (1802–1868), French physician and entomologist
- Anselm von Rothschild (1803–1874), Austrian banker and member of the Vienna branch of the Rothschild family
- Karl Friedrich Hermann (1804–1855), classical scholar and antiquary
- Marie d'Agoult (1805–1876), French author

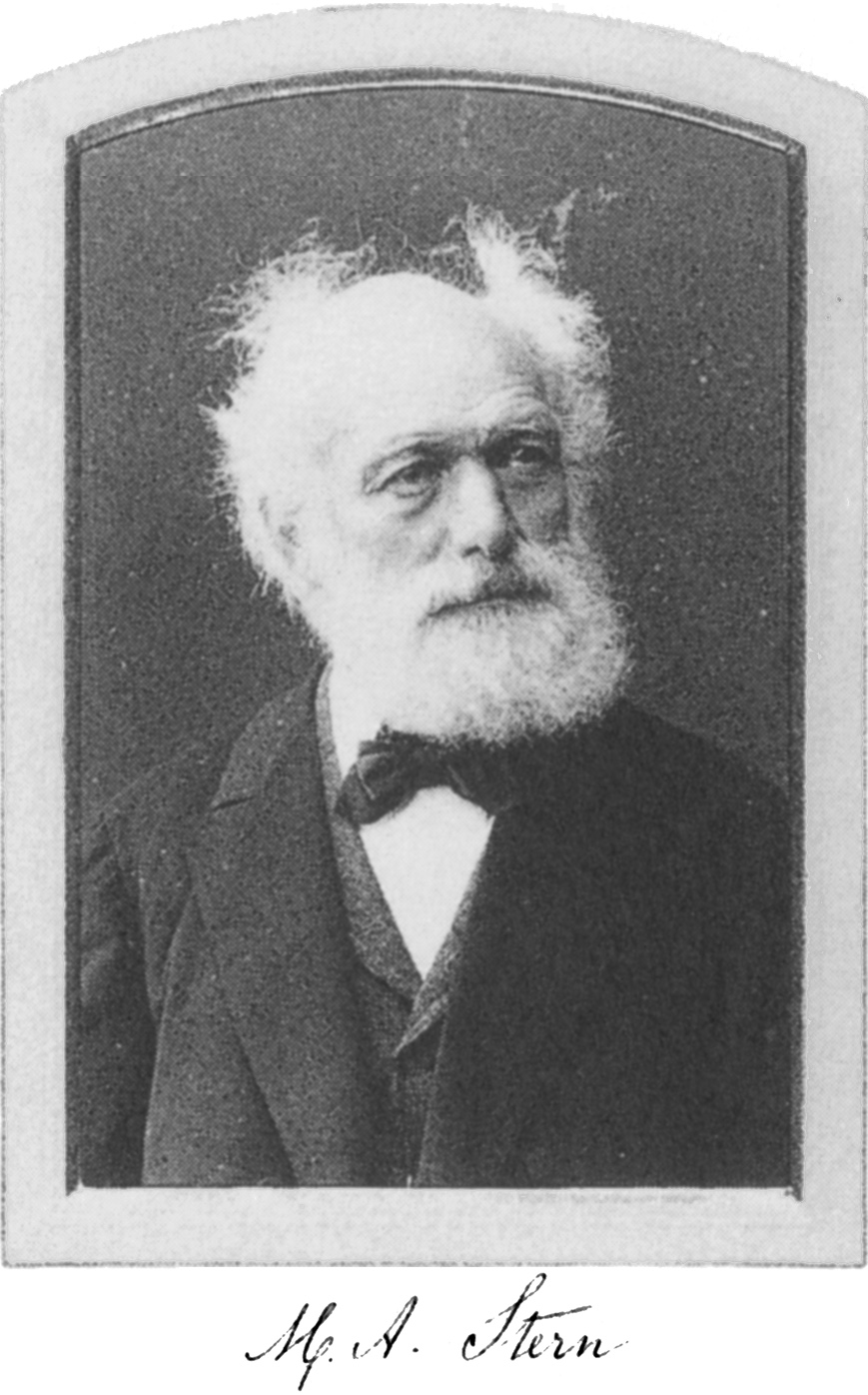
Moritz Abraham Stern

- Moritz Abraham Stern (1807–1894), mathematician
- Georg Fresenius (1808–1866), physician and botanist
- Johann Benedict Listing (1808–1882), mathematician
- Ernst Ludwig von Leutsch (1808–1887), classical philologist
- George Engelmann (1809–1884), German-American botanist
- Jakob Fürchtegott Dielmann (1809–1885), illustrator, genre and landscape painter
- Heinrich Hoffmann (1809–1894), psychiatrist and author
- Gustav Koerner (1809–1896), revolutionary, journalist, lawyer, politician, judge, statesman in Illinois and Germany and Colonel of the U.S. Army
- Abraham Geiger (1810–1874 ), leader of Reform Judaism
- Johann Georg von Hahn (1811–1869), Austrian diplomat, philologist and specialist in Albanian history, language and culture
- Moritz von Bethmann (1811–1877), banker
- Ferdinand Hiller (1811–1885), composer, conductor, writer and music-director
- Henri Nestlé (1814–1890), Swiss confectioner and founder of Nestlé, the world's largest food and beverage company
- Joseph Hoch (1815–1874), lawyer and benefactor
- August Weber (1817–1873), painter
- Carl Remigius Fresenius (1818–1897), chemist
- Henri Weil (1818–1909), philologist
- Heinrich Bernhard Oppenheim (1819–1880), publicist and philosopher
- Mayer Carl von Rothschild (1820–1886), banker and politician
- Carl Theodor Reiffenstein (1820–1893), landscape and architecture painter

==== 1821–1840 ====
- Mathilde Marchesi (1821–1913), mezzo-soprano, teacher of singing, and proponent of the bel canto vocal method
- Heinrich Frey (1822–1890), Swiss entomologist
- Georg Heinrich Mettenius (1823–1866), botanist
- Moritz Schiff (1823–1896), physiologist
- Willibald Beyschlag (1823–1900), theologian
- Peter Burnitz (1824–1886), lawyer and landscape painter
- Anton Burger (1824–1905), painter, draftsman and etcher
- Karl Otto Weber (1827–1867), surgeon and pathologist
- Adolf Schreyer (1828–1899), painter
- Wilhelm Carl von Rothschild (1828–1901), banker and financier of the Frankfurt House of Rothschild
- Lazarus Geiger (1829–1870), philologist and philosopher
- Victor Müller (1829–1871), painter
- Heinrich Anton de Bary (1831–1888), surgeon, botanist, microbiologist, and mycologist
- Frédéric Émile d'Erlanger (1832–1911), banker and Consul
- Mathilde Hannah von Rothschild (1832–1924), baroness, composer and patron of the Jewish faith
- Jean Baptista von Schweitzer (1833–1875), politician and dramatic poet
- Otto Scholderer (1834–1902), painter
- Wilhelm von Scherff (1834–1911), general and military writer
- Ernst Georg Ravenstein (1834–1913), geographer cartographer and promoter of physical exercise
- Giorgio Sommer (1834–1914), photographer
- August Weismann (1834–1914), biologist
- Hugo Schiff (1834–1915), chemist
- Nathaniel Meyer von Rothschild (1836–1905), member of the Rothschild banking family of Austria
- Joseph Maria von Radowitz, Jr. (1839–1912), diplomat
- Alexander Riese (1840–1924), classical scholar

==== 1841–1860 ====
- Karl Binding (1841–1920), jurist
- Carl Gräbe (1841–1927), industrial and academic chemist
- Karl Lentzner (1842–1905), linguist
- Maximilian von Goldschmidt-Rothschild (1843–1940), banker and art collector
- Michael Flürscheim (1844–1912), economist and Georgist
- Emil Ponfick (1844–1913), pathologist
- Hans von Zwiedineck-Südenhorst (1845–1906), historian
- Otto Böhler (1847–1913), silhouette artist
- Jacob Schiff (1847–1920), American banker, businessman, and philanthropist
- Alice Charlotte von Rothschild (1847–1922), socialite and member of the Rothschild banking family of Austria
- William Ralph Merton (1848–1916), entrepreneur, social democrat and philanthropist
- Otto Bütschli (1848–1920), zoologist
- Heinrich Bassermann (1849–1909), Lutheran theologian
- Anton Urspruch (1850–1907), composer and pedagogue
- Wilhelm Creizenach (1851–1919), historian and librarian
- Arthur Schuster (1851–1934), British physicist
- Wilhelm von Bismarck (1852–1901), counselor, civil servant and politician
- Carl L. Nippert (1852–1904), engineer and politician
- Carl Chun (1852–1914), marine biologist
- Goby Eberhardt (1852–1926), violinist and composer
- Karl Höchberg (1853–1885), social-reformist writer, publisher and economist
- Karl Sudhoff (1853–1938), historian of medicine
- Moritz von Leonhardi (1856–1910), anthropologist
- Hermann Dessau (1856–1931), ancient historian and epigrapher
- Siegfried Ochs (1858–1929), choir-leader and composer
- Otto Böckel (1859–1923), populist politician
- Alfons Mumm von Schwarzenstein (1859–1924), diplomat
- Philipp Franck (1860–1944), Impressionist painter

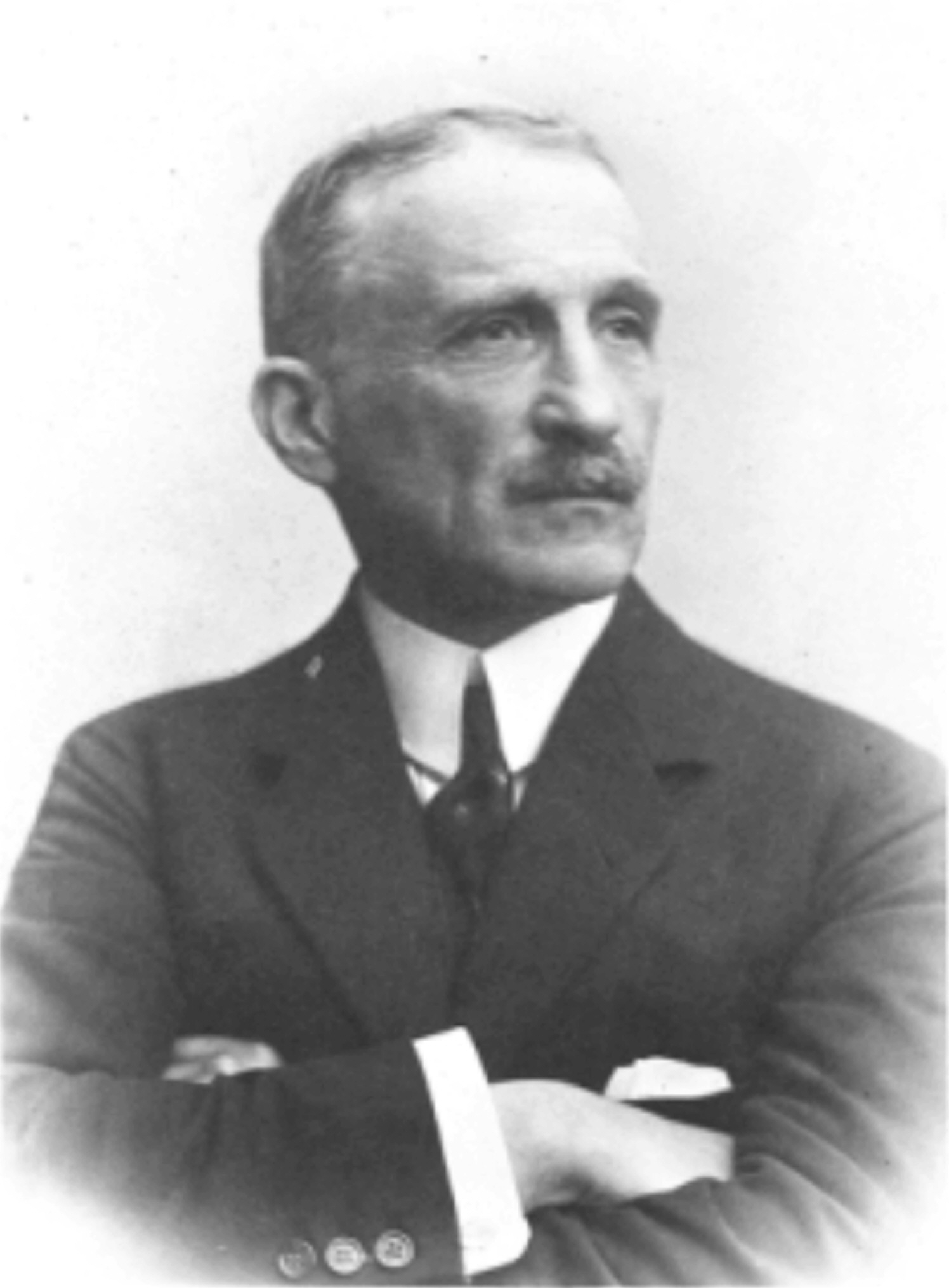
Arthur von Weinberg

- Arthur von Weinberg (1860–1943), chemist and industrialist

==== 1861–1880 ====
- Franz Joseph von Bülow (1861–1915), writer
- Ludwig Fulda (1862–1939), playwright and a poet
- Theodor Ziehen (1862–1950), neurologist and psychiatrist
- Karl Wilhelm von Meister (1863–1935), politician and diplomat
- Karl Schaum (1870–1947), chemist

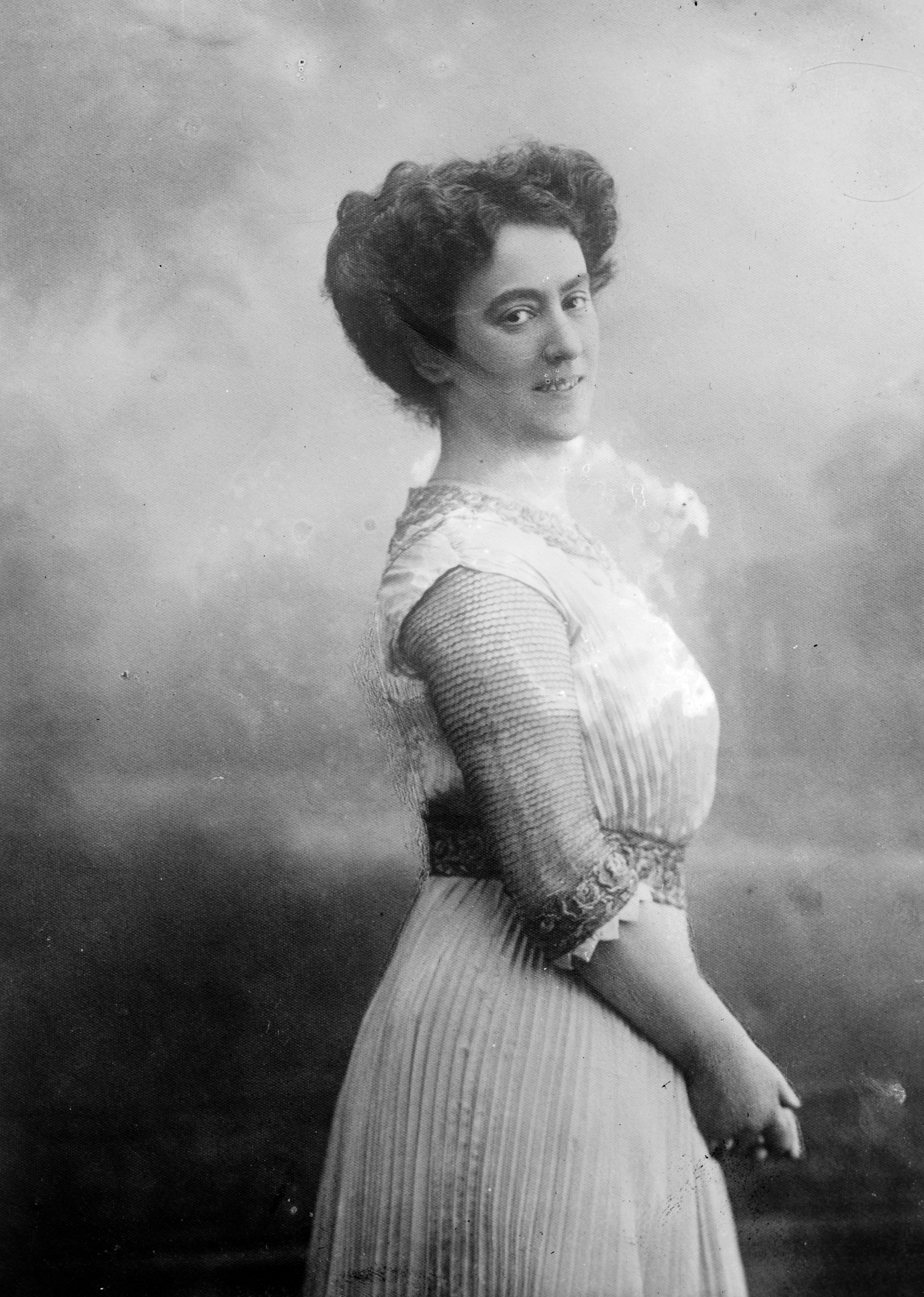
Rahel Hirsch

- Rahel Hirsch (1870–1953), doctor and professor
- Fritz Klimsch (1870–1960), sculptor
- Paul Epstein (1871–1939), mathematician
- Bernhard Sekles (1872–1934), composer, conductor, pianist and pedagogue
- Alfred Hertz (1872–1942), American conductor
- Karl Maria Kaufmann (1872-1951), Biblical archaeologist

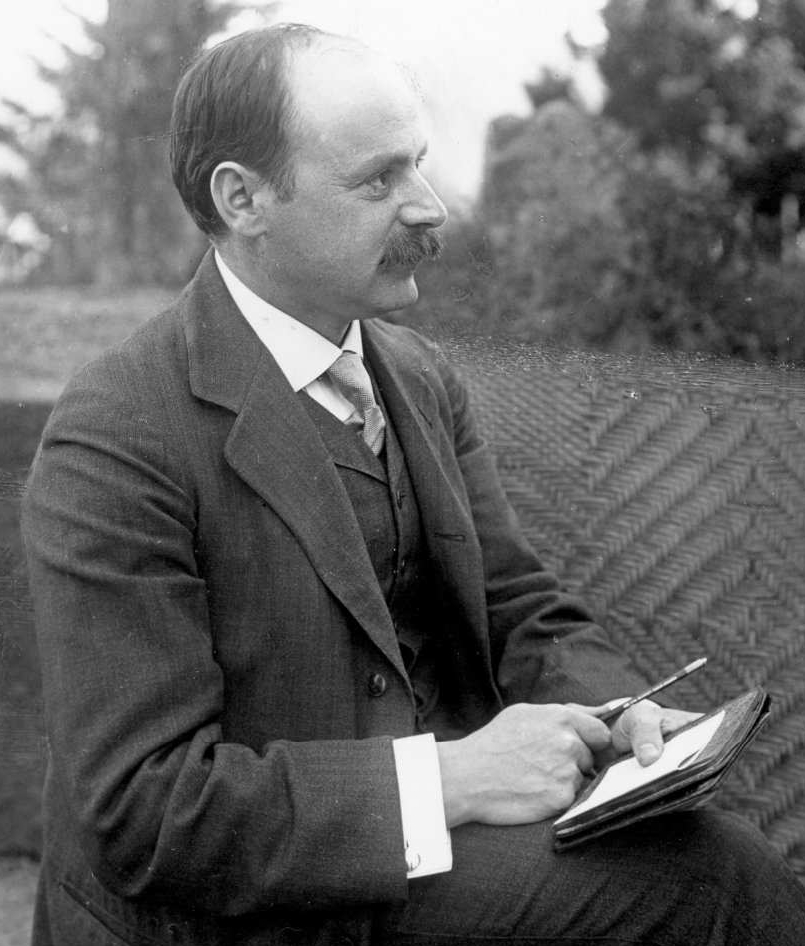
Karl Schwarzschild

- Karl Schwarzschild (1873–1916), astronomer and physicist
- Otto Loewi (1873–1961), pharmacologist
- Eduard Fresenius (1874–1946), pharmacist and entrepreneur
- Gerhard Hessenberg (1874–1925), mathematician
- Marcel Sulzberger (1876–1941), Swiss composer, pianist and music author
- Otto Blumenthal (1876–1944), mathematician and professor
- Willy Kaiser-Heyl (1876–1953), film actor
- Isaac Heinemann (1876–1957), rabbinical scholar and professor of classical literature, Hellenistic literature and philology
- Hermann Fellner (1877–1936), screenwriter and film producer
- Arthur Scherbius (1878–1929), electrical engineer
- Ottilie Metzger-Lattermann (1878–1943), contralto
- Richard Goldschmidt (1878–1958), geneticist
- Harry Fuld (1879–1932), entrepreneur whose art collection was looted by Nazis
- Hugo Merton (1879–1940), zoologist
- F.W. Schröder-Schrom (1879–1956), actor

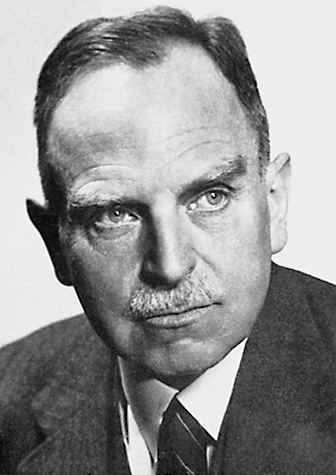
Otto Hahn

- Otto Hahn (1879–1968), chemist and pioneer in the fields of radioactivity and radiochemistry
- Moritz Geiger (1880–1937), philosopher
- Karl von Roques (1880–1949), general and war criminal during World War II
- Paul Maas (1880–1964), classical scholar

==== 1881–1900 ====
- Hermann Zilcher (1881–1948), composer and conductor
- Wilhelm Dörr (1881–1955), track and field athlete and tug of war competitor
- Hans Fischer (1881–1945), organic chemist
- Walter Braunfels (1882–1954), composer, pianist, and music educator

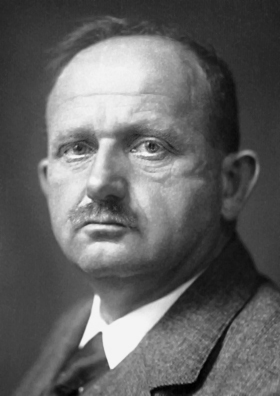
Hans Fischer

- Georg von Neufville (1883–1941), Wehrmacht general during World War II
- Else Gentner-Fischer (1883–1943), operatic soprano
- Hermann Abendroth (1883–1956), conductor
- Ludwig Schunk (1884–1947), manufacturer and cofounder of the firm of Schunk und Ebe oHG
- Ida Wüst (1884–1958), stage and film actress
- Gus Wickie (1885–1947), German-American bass singer and voice actor
- Erich Schönfelder (1885–1933), screenwriter, actor and film director
- Walther Davisson (1885–1973), violinist and conductor
- Karl Friedrich Freiherr von Schorlemer (1886–1936), nobleman, estate manager and politician
- Ernst May (1886–1970), architect and city planner
- Walter Ruttmann (1887–1941), film director and early practitioner of experimental film
- Hans Adalbert Schlettow (1887–1945), film actor
- Otto Maull (1887–1957), geographer and geopolitician
- Oscar Kreuzer (1887–1968), tennis and rugby player
- Wilhelm Lenz (1888–1957), physicist
- Fritz Becker (1888–1963), football player
- Gussy Holl (1888–1966), actress and singer
- Caesar Rudolf Boettger (1888–1976), zoologist
- Herman Bing (1889–1947), actor
- Johanna Kirchner (1889–1944), opponent of the Nazi régime
- Ernst Schwarz (1889–1962), zoologist, mammalogist, and herpetologist
- Heinrich Jacoby (1889–1964), musician and educator

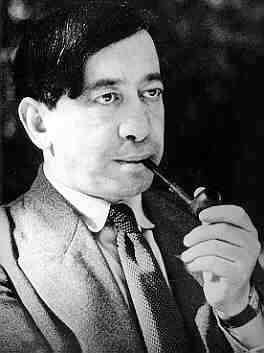
Siegfried Kracauer

- Siegfried Kracauer (1889–1966), writer, journalist, sociologist, film theorist, and cultural critic
- Otto Frank (1889–1980), businessman
- Martin Weber (1890–1941), architect
- Otto Schmöle (1890–1968), actor
- Martha Wertheimer (1890–1942), journalist, writer, and rescuer
- Leopold Schwarzschild (1891–1950), author
- Karl Ludwig Schmidt (1891–1956), theologian and professor
- Felix Schlag (1891–1974), designer of the United States five cent coin in use from 1938 to 2004
- Elisabeth Schmitt (1891-1974), lawyer and first woman in Germany to earn a PhD in law
- Erwin Straus (1891–1975), German-American phenomenologist and neurologist
- Hans Leybold (1892–1914), poet
- Jakob Weiseborn (1892–1939), SS-Sturmbannführer (major) and commandant of Flossenbürg concentration camp
- Friedrich Weber (1892–1955), instructor in veterinary medicine
- Eugen Kaufmann (1892–1984), architect
- Gus Meins (1893–1940), German-American film director
- Ilse Friedleben (1893–1963), tennis player
- Ludwig Hirschfeld Mack (1893–1965), artist
- Johann Fück (1894–1974), orientalist
- Karl Reinhardt (1895–1941), mathematician

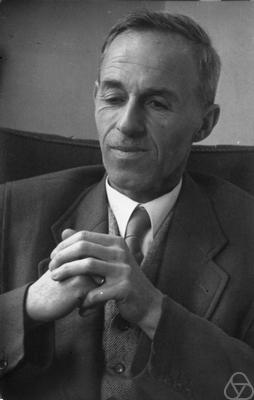
Wilhelm Süss

- Wilhelm Süss (1895–1958), mathematician

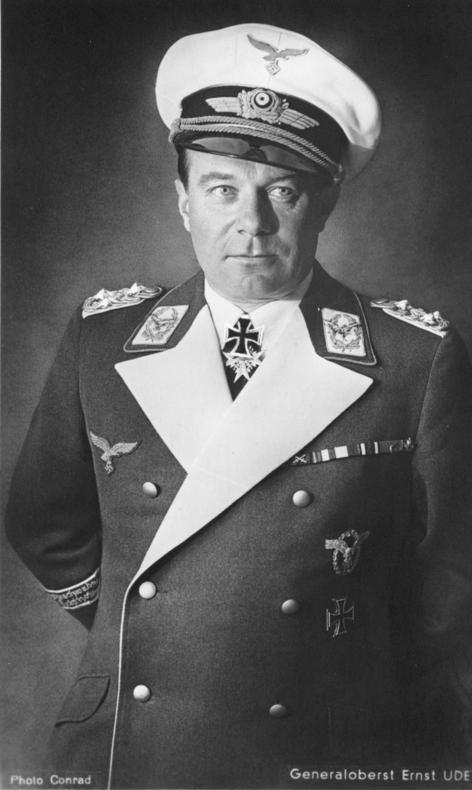
Ernst Udet

- Ernst Udet (1896–1941), German flying ace of World War I
- Theodor Haubach (1896–1945), journalist, SPD politician, and resistance fighter against the Nazi régime
- Walter Peterhans (1897–1960), photographer
- Tilly Edinger (1897–1967), paleontologist
- Karl Freiherr von Lersner (1898–1943), Wehrmacht general during World War II
- Karl Menninger (1898–1963), mathematician

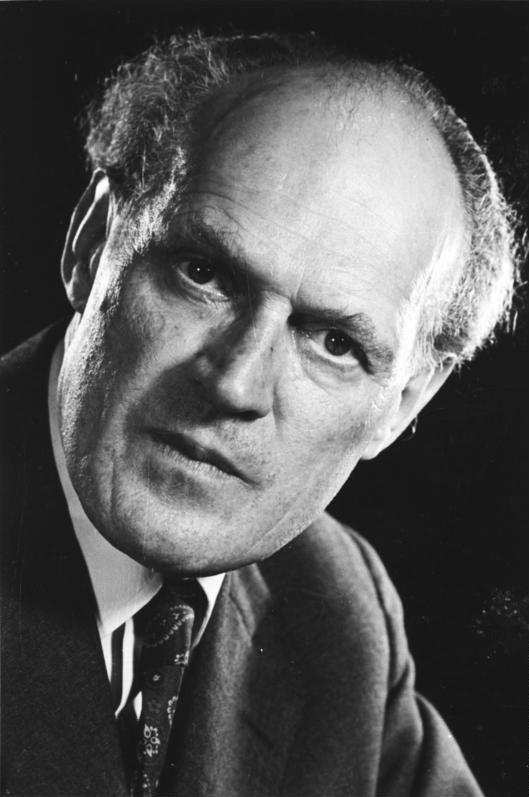
Willy Messerschmitt

- Franz Altheim (1898–1976), historian
- Hans Feibusch (1898–1998), painter and sculptor
- Willy Messerschmitt (1898–1978), aircraft designer and manufacturer
- Ferdinand Kramer (1898–1985), architect and functionalist designer
- Nelly Neppach (née Bamberger; 1898–1933), female tennis player
- Irnfried Freiherr von Wechmar (1899–1959), Oberst in the Wehrmacht during World War II and an Oberst der Reserve in the Bundeswehr
- Ilse Bing (1899–1998), avant-garde and commercial photographer
- Paul Leser (1899–1984), ethnologist
- Ernst Friedrich Löhndorff (1899–1976), sailor, adventurer, and writer
- Erich Fromm (1900–1980), social psychologist, psychoanalyst, sociologist, humanistic philosopher, and democratic socialist
- Otto Kahn-Freund (1900–1979), professor of comparative law and scholar in labour law
- Erich Klibansky (1900–1942), headmaster and teacher of the first Jewish Gymnasium of Rhineland in Cologne
- Leo Löwenthal (1900–1993), sociologist

=== 20th century ===
==== 1901–1910 ====
- Georg August Zinn (1901–1976), lawyer and politician
- Elisabeth Schwarzhaupt (1901–1986), politician
- Adolf Weidmann (1901–1997), athlete and sports official
- Otto Bayer (1902–1982), industrial chemist
- Fritz Bamberger (1902–1984), scholar and editor
- Hugo Schrader (1902–1993), television and film actor
- Max Rudolf (1902–1995), conductor

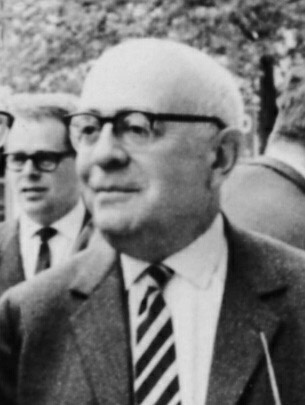
Theodor W. Adorno

- Theodor W. Adorno (1903–1969), sociologist, philosopher and musicologist
- Julius Eisenecker (1903–1981), fencer
- Karl Chmielewski (1903–1991), SS officer and Herzogenbusch concentration camp commandant
- Otto Mainzer (1903–1995), writer
- Camilla Horn (1903–1996), dancer and film star
- Fritz Weitzel (1904–1940), SS soldier
- Karl Hessenberg (1904–1959), engineer and mathematician
- Milly Reuter (1904–1976), track and field athlete
- Günther Gräntz (1905–1945), SA general and politician
- Richard Ettinghausen (1906–1979), art historian
- Wolfgang Gentner (1906–1980), experimental nuclear physicist
- Helmut Landsberg (1906–1985), climatologist
- Willibald Kreß (1906–1989), footballer

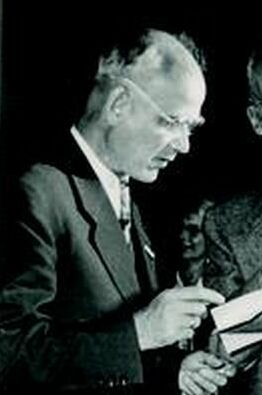
Ott-Heinrich Keller

- Ott-Heinrich Keller (1906–1990), mathematician
- Karl Holzamer (1906–2007), philosopher, pedagogue and former director general of German television station ZDF
- Franka Rasmussen (1907–1994), textile artist
- Herman Geiger-Torel (1907–1976), Canadian opera director
- Eugen Weidmann (1908–1939), career criminal

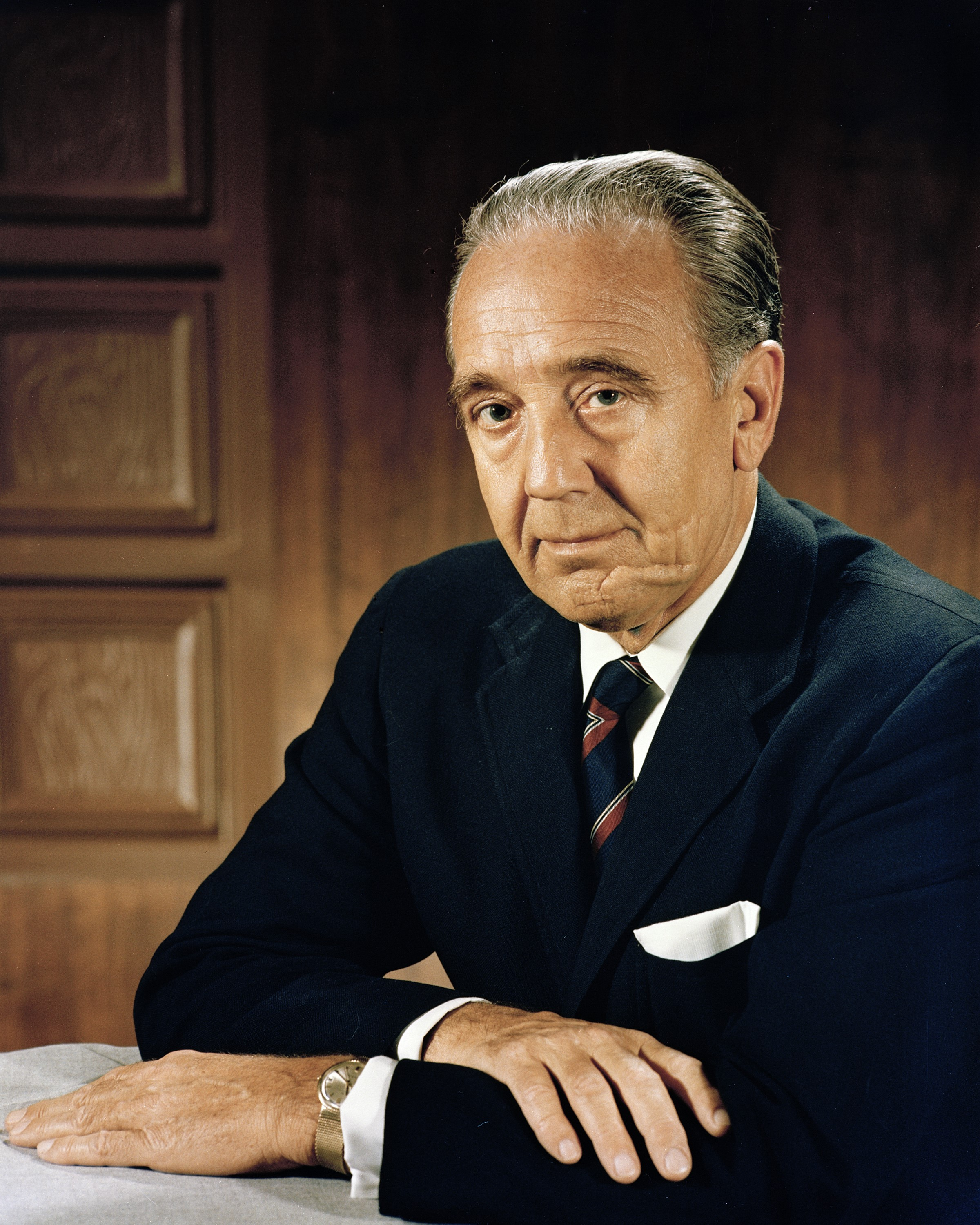
Kurt H. Debus

- Kurt H. Debus (1908–1983), spaceflight scientist
- Rudolf Gramlich (1908–1988), football player and chairman
- Arthur Dreifuss (1908–1993), film director and occasional producer and screenwriter
- Kurt Hessenberg (1908–1994), composer and professor
- John Slade (1908–2005), American Olympic field hockey player and Wall Street broker
- Edgar Weil (1908–1941), Germanist, dramaturge, and merchant

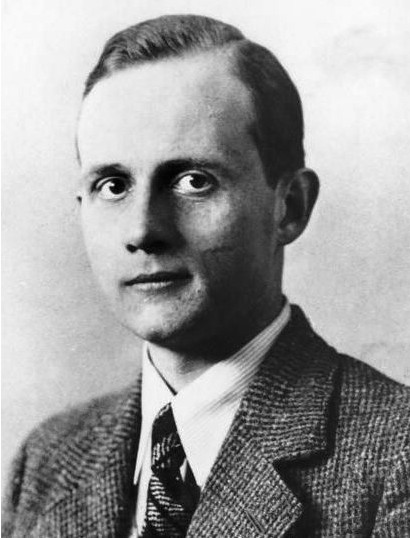
Ernst vom Rath

- Ernst vom Rath (1909–1938), diplomat
- Andrew Thorndike (1909–1979), documentary film director
- Georg Konrad Morgen (1909–1982), SS judge and lawyer
- Friedrich Bopp (1909–1987), theoretical physicist
- Helm Glöckler (1909–1993), racing driver
- Kurt Lipstein (1909–2006), legal scholar and professor
- Walter Löber (1909–?), racing cyclist
- Tatjana Sais (1910–1981), film actress
- Barys Kit (1910–2018), Belarusian-American rocket scientist
- Fritz Tillmann (1910–1986), actor
- Erwin Walter Palm (1910–1988), scholar, historian, and writer
- Richard Plant (1910–1998), writer
- Robert H. Goetz (1910–2000), surgeon
- Erika Fromm (1910–2003), psychologist

==== 1911–1920 ====
- Karl Heinz Bremer (1911–1942), historian
- Theodor Schneider (1911–1988), mathematician
- Bruno Roth (1911–1998), racing cyclist
- Tilly Fleischer (1911–2005), athlete
- Bruno Beger (1911–2009), racial anthropologist
- Hermann Flohn (1912–1997), climatologist
- Theo Helfrich (1913–1978), racing driver
- Manfred Kersch (1913–1995), athlete
- Karl Dröse (1913–1996), field hockey player
- Bernhard Frank (1913–2011), Nazi leader
- Emil Carlebach (1914–2001), writer, dissident, and journalist
- Herbert Cahn (1915–2002), classical archaeologist, numismatist, coin-dealer and antiquities-dealer

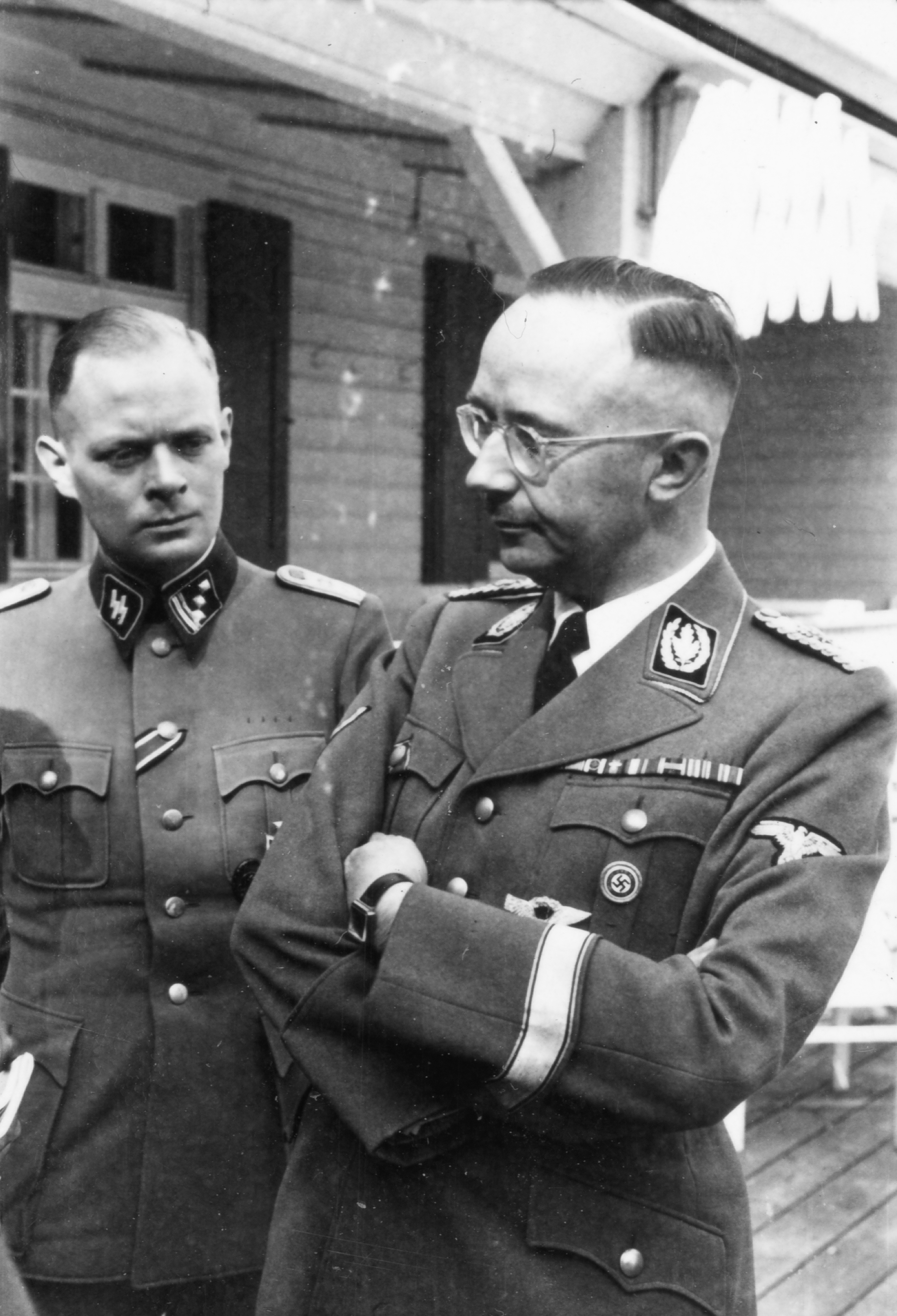
Werner Grothmann (left)

- Werner Grothmann (1915–2002), SS leader
- Wolf Kaiser (1916–1992), theatre and film actor
- Karl Wald (1916–2011), football referee
- Bernd T. Matthias (1918–1980), American physicist
- Toby E. Rodes (1919–2013), business consultant, design-critic, journalist, and lecturer

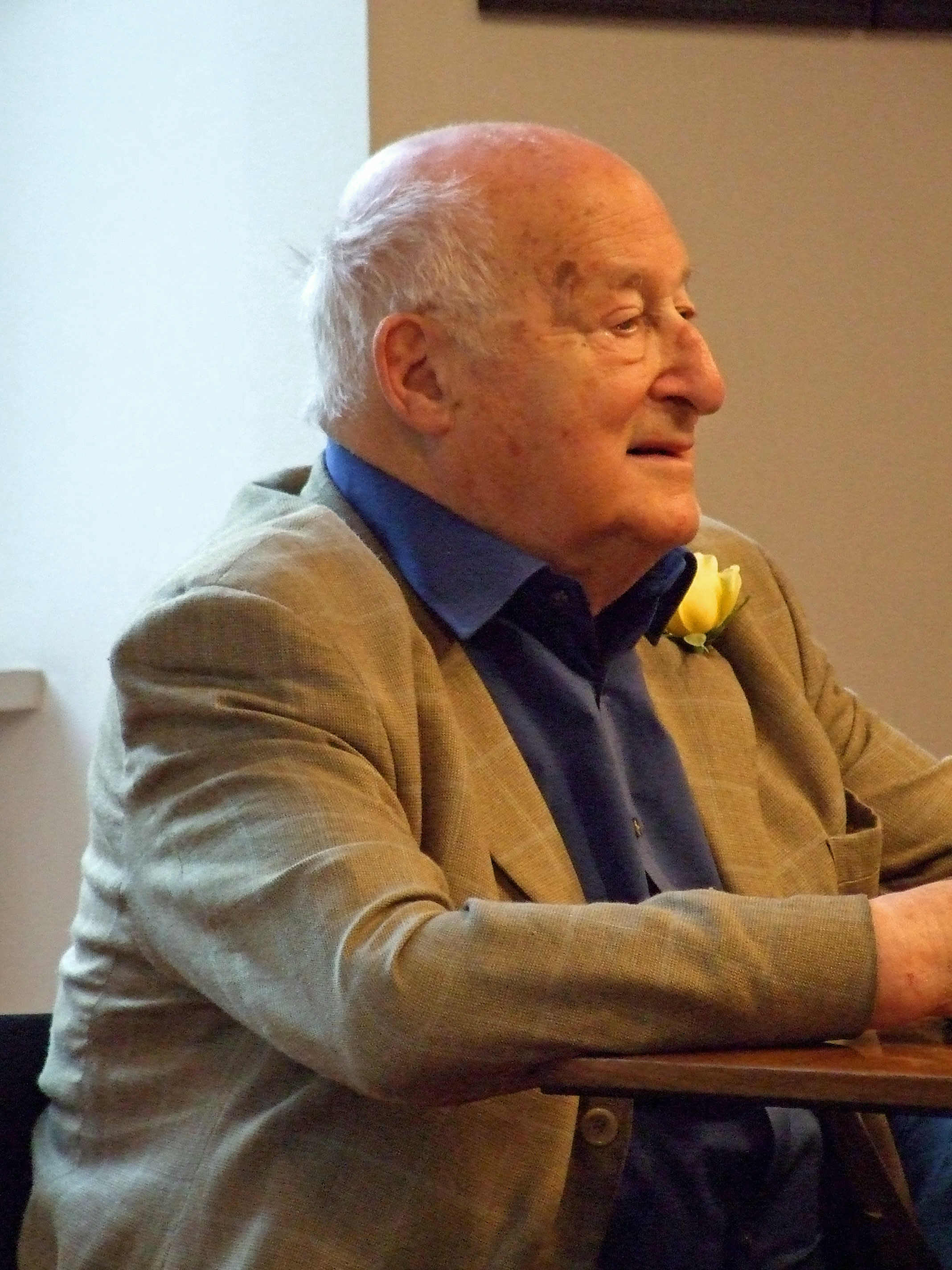
Eric Koch

- Eric Koch (1919–2018), Canadian author, broadcaster and professor
- Wolfdietrich Schnurre (1920–1989), writer

==== 1921–1930 ====
- Wilhelm Ringelband (1921–1981), theater critic
- Frederick Mayer (1921–2006), educational scientist, philosopher, and creativity expert
- Hans Herrman Strupp (1921–2006), American expert in psychotherapy research
- Ernest Mandel (1923–1995), revolutionary Marxist theorist
- Samson François (1924–1970), French pianist and composer
- Ernst B. Haas (1924–2003), political scientist
- Marianne Beuchert (1924–2007), florist, gardener, and writer
- Jürgen Jürgens (1925–1994), choral conductor and academic teacher
- Carlrichard Brühl (1925–1997), historian of medieval history and philatelist

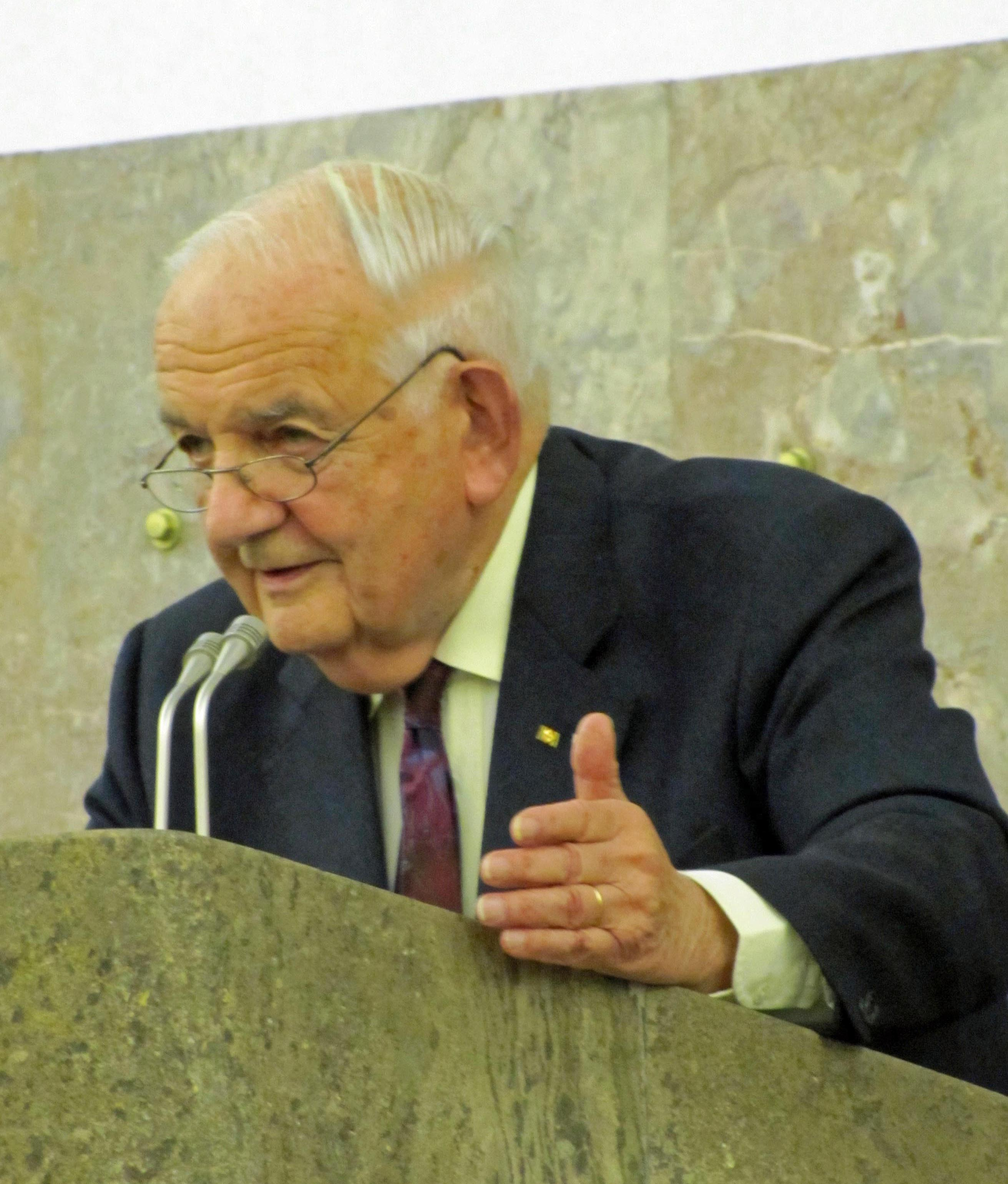
Alfred Grosser

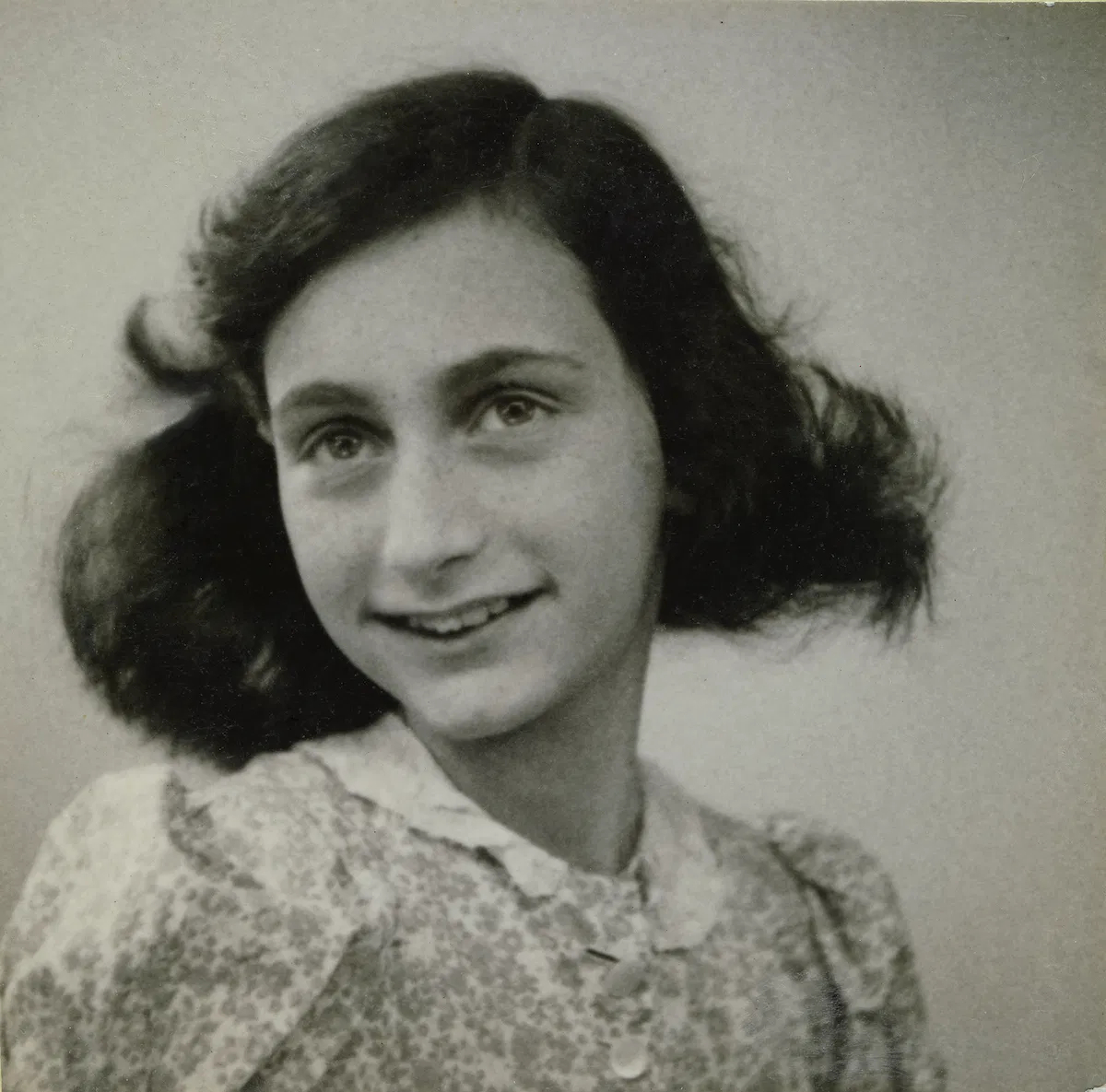
Anne Frank

- Alfred Grosser (1925–2024), German-French writer, sociologist, and political scientist
- Emil Mangelsdorff (1925–2022), jazz musician
- Margot Frank (1926–1945), sister of Anne Frank
- Herbert Freudenberger (1926–1999), psychologist
- Liselott Linsenhoff (1927–1999), equestrian and Olympic champion
- Hans Heinz Holz (1927–2011), Marxist philosopher
- Charlotte Kerr (1927–2011), director, film producer, actress, writer, and journalist
- Marcel Ophuls (1927–2025), documentary film maker and former actor
- Albert Mangelsdorff (1928–2005), jazz trombonist
- Anne Frank (1929–1945), diarist and writer
- Erich Böhme (1930–2009), journalist and television host
- Robert Aumann (born 1930), Israeli-American mathematician
- Ursula Lehr (1930–2022), academic, age researcher, and politician
- Michael Rossmann (1930–2019), German-American physicist, microbiologist, and professor

==== 1931–1940 ====
- Imanuel Geiss (1931–2012), historian
- August Hobl (born 1931), former motorcycle road racer
- Lis Verhoeven (1931–2019), actress and theatre director
- Rainer K. Sachs (1932–2024), German-American computational radiation biologist and astronomer
- Hans Krieger (1933–2023), writer, essayist, journalist of influential weekly papers, broadcaster, and poet
- Mary Bauermeister (1934–2023), artist
- Erwin Conradi (born 1935), manager in trade business
- Michael Horovitz (1935–2021), German-born British poet, editor, visual artist, and translator
- Gisela Kessler (1935–2014), trade unionist
- Heinz Riesenhuber (born 1935), politician
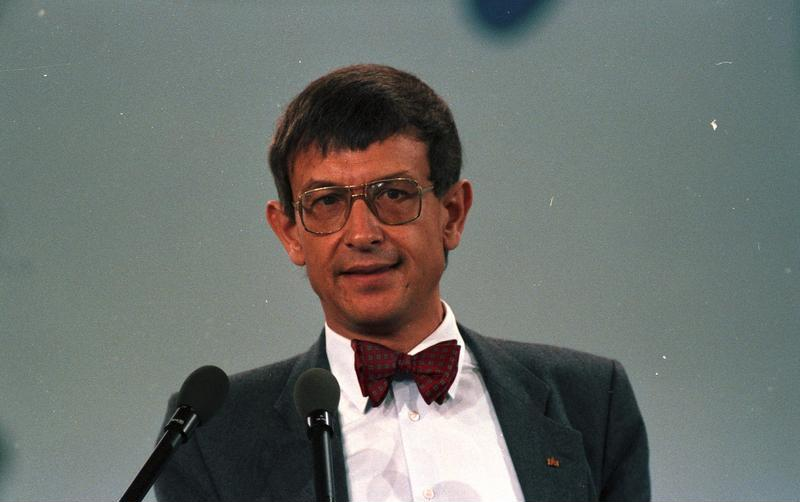
  Heinz Riesenhuber
- Ulrich Schindel (1935–2025), classical philologist
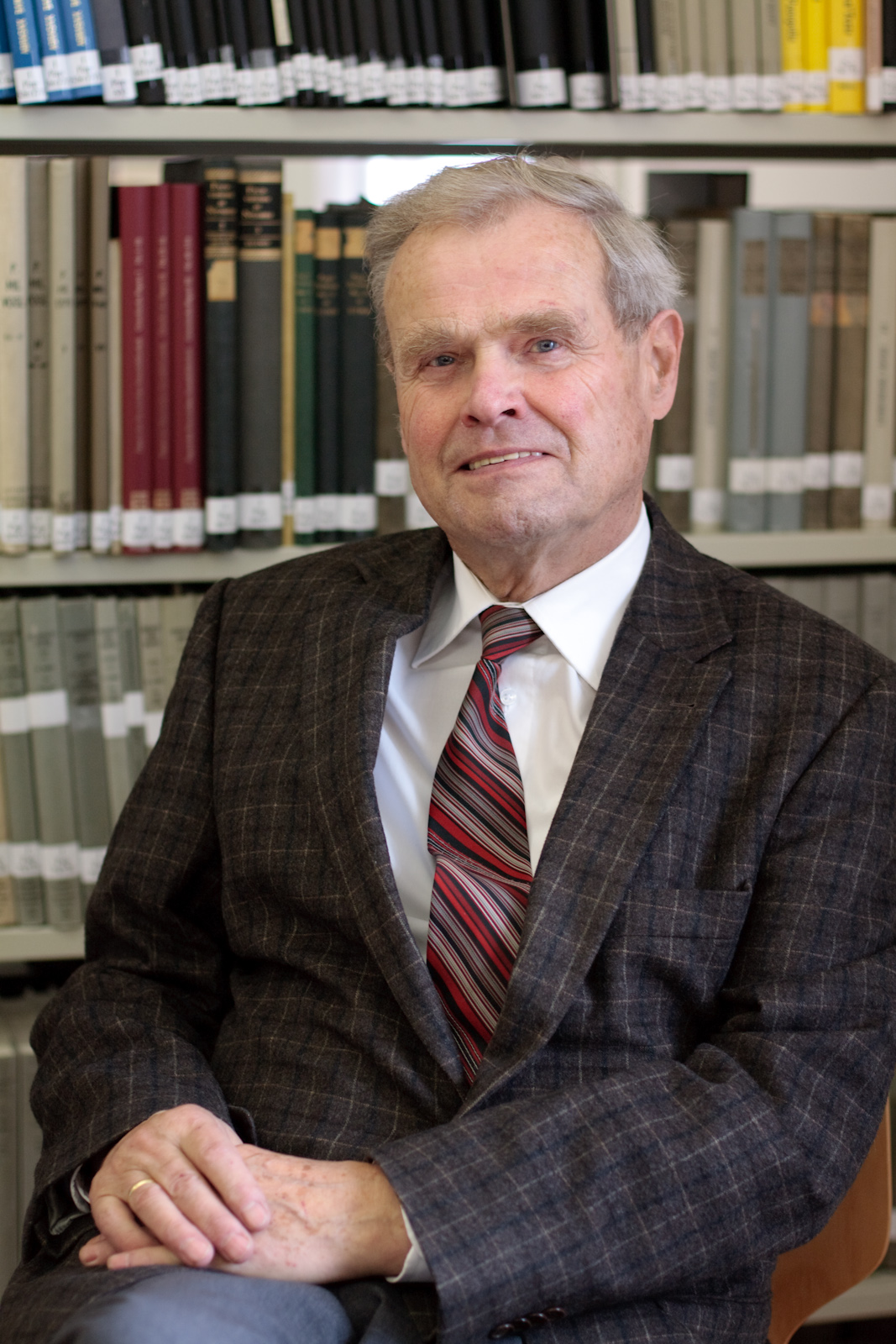
  Ulrich Schindel
- Susanne Cramer (1936–1969), film and television actress
- Klaus Heymann (born 1936), entrepreneur
- Franz Ningel (born 1936), pair skater and roller skater
- Klaus Rajewsky (born 1936), immunologist
- Dieter Schenk (born 1937), author, former high police officer, and activist
- Wolfgang Zapf (1937–2018), sociologist

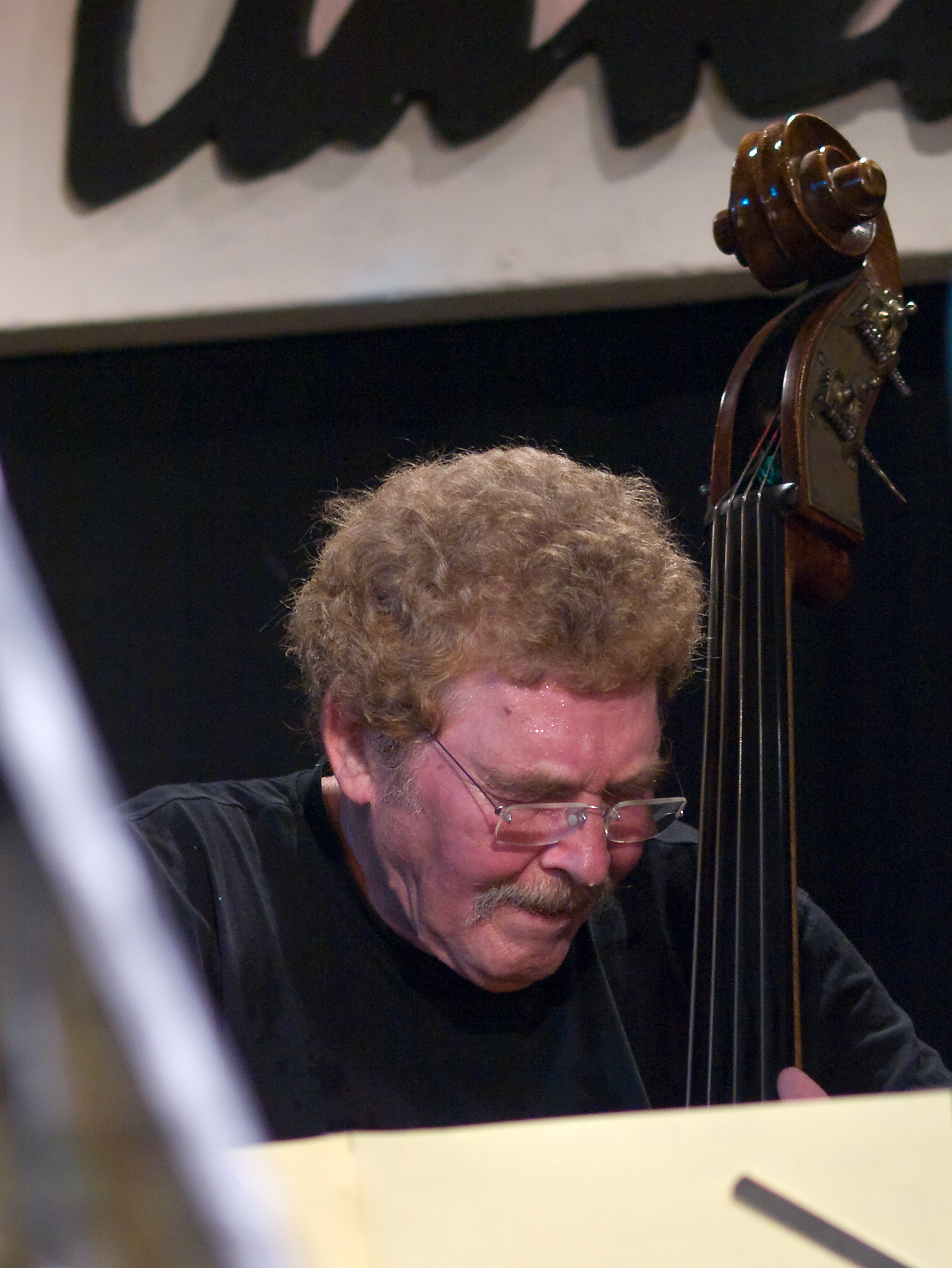
Günter Lenz

- Günter Lenz (1938)–2026, jazz bassist and composer
- Fritz-Albert Popp (1938–2018), biophysicist
- Gerhard Waibel (born 1938), engineer
- Gerhard Amendt (born 1939), sociologist and former professor
- Gerd Kehrer (born 1939), painter
- Wolfram Saenger (born 1939), biochemist and protein crystallographer
- Bernhard Sinkel (born 1940), film director and screenwriter
- Wolfgang Solz (1940–2017), former professional football winger
- Klaus Zehelein (born 1940), dramaturge and professor

==== 1941–1950 ====
- Brigitte Heinrich (1941–1987), journalist and politician
- Ernst-Ludwig Winnacker (born 1941), geneticist, biochemist, and research manager
- Ernst Klee (1942–2013), journalist and author
- Heidemarie Wieczorek-Zeul (born 1942), politician
- Marika Kilius (born 1943), pair skater
- Ursula G.T. Müller (born 1944), sociologist specializing in gender studies

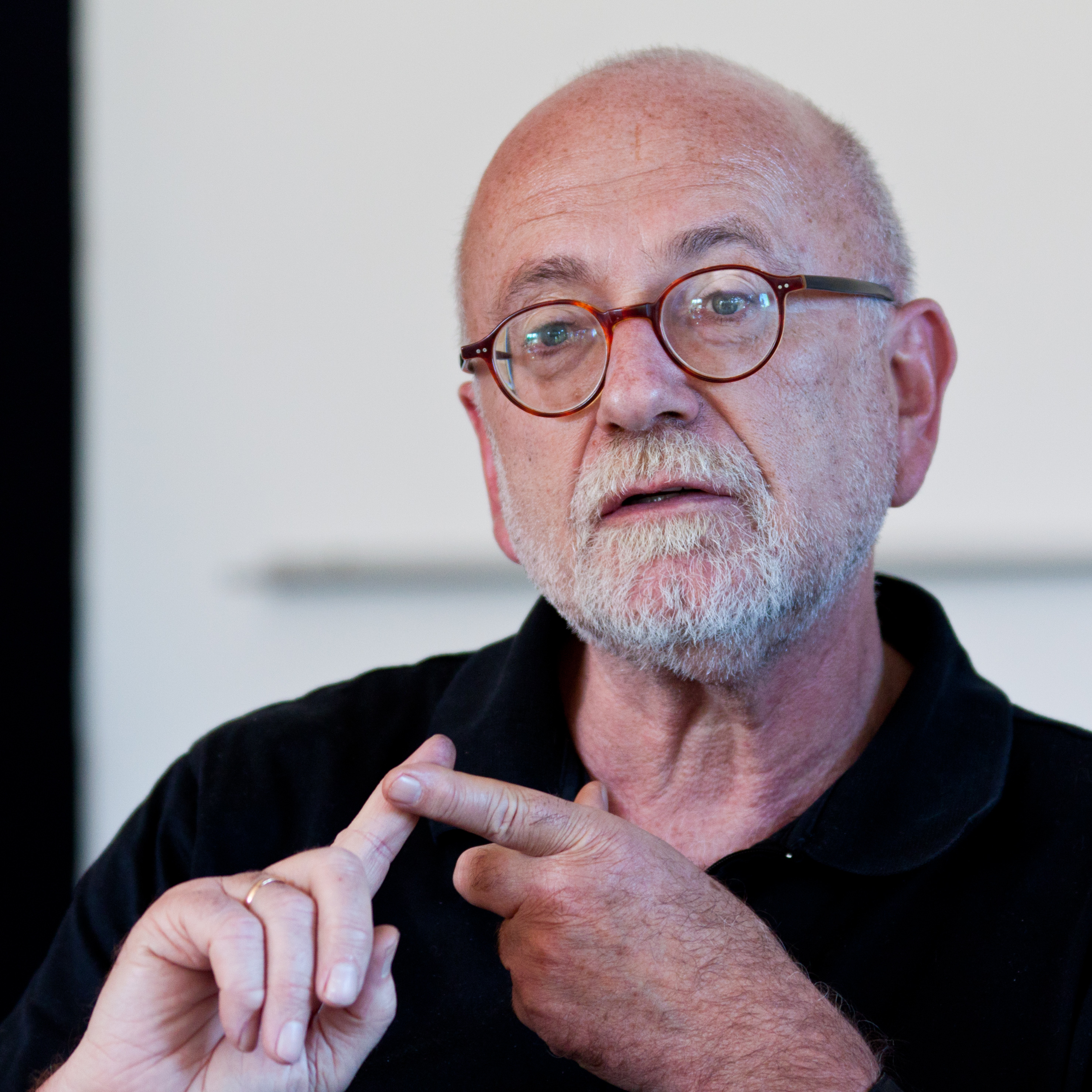
Jürgen Roth

- Jürgen Roth (1945–2017), publicist and investigative journalist
- Gerhard Welz (born 1945), former professional footballer

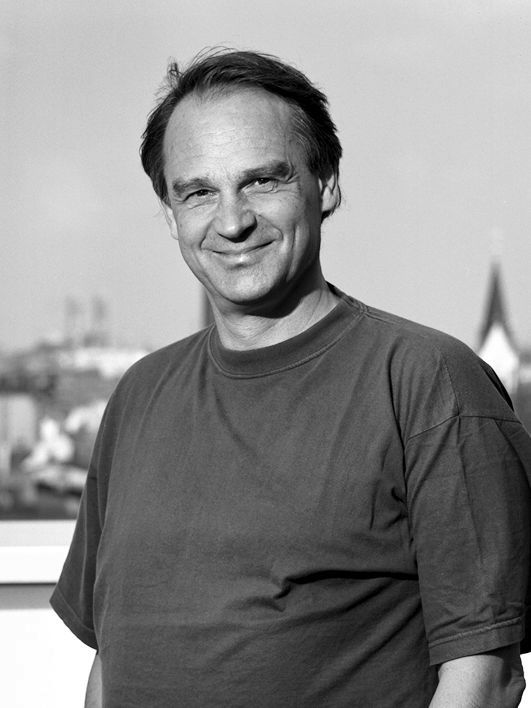
Gerd Binnig

- Gerd Binnig (born 1947), physicist and Nobel laureate

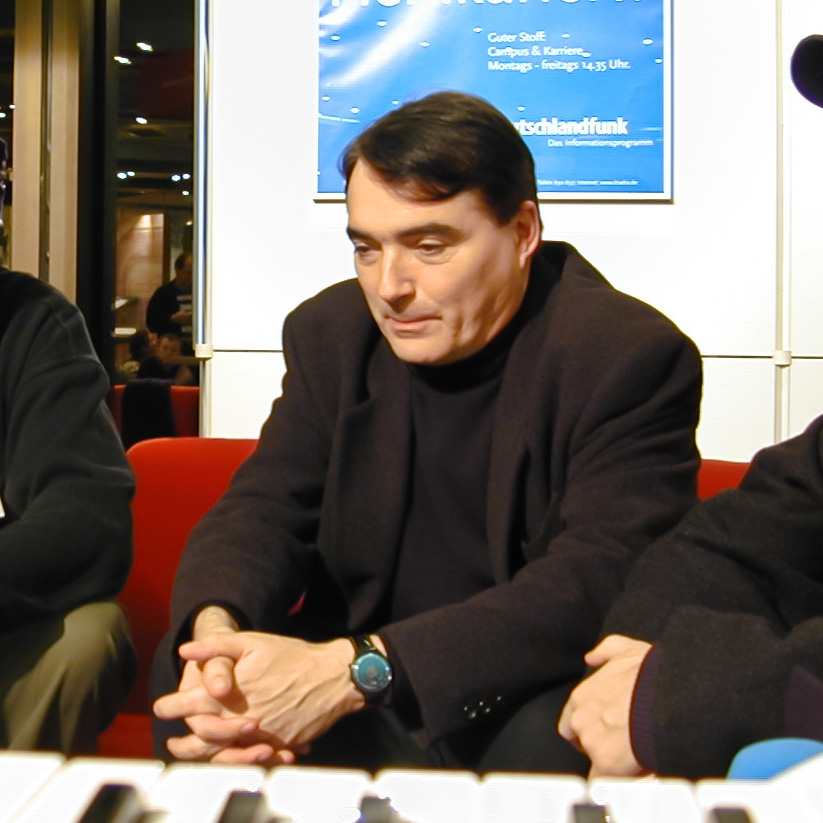
Wolfgang Flür

- Wolfgang Flür (born 1947), musician
- Hans-Joachim Klein (1947–2022), terrorist
- Minka Pradelski (born 1947), sociologist and documentary filmmaker
- Susan Blakely (born 1948), American film actress
- Diethelm Sack (born 1948), financial officer
- Rolf Birkhölzer (born 1949), footballer
- Horst Dröse (born 1949), former field hockey player
- Margot Glockshuber (born 1949), former pair skater

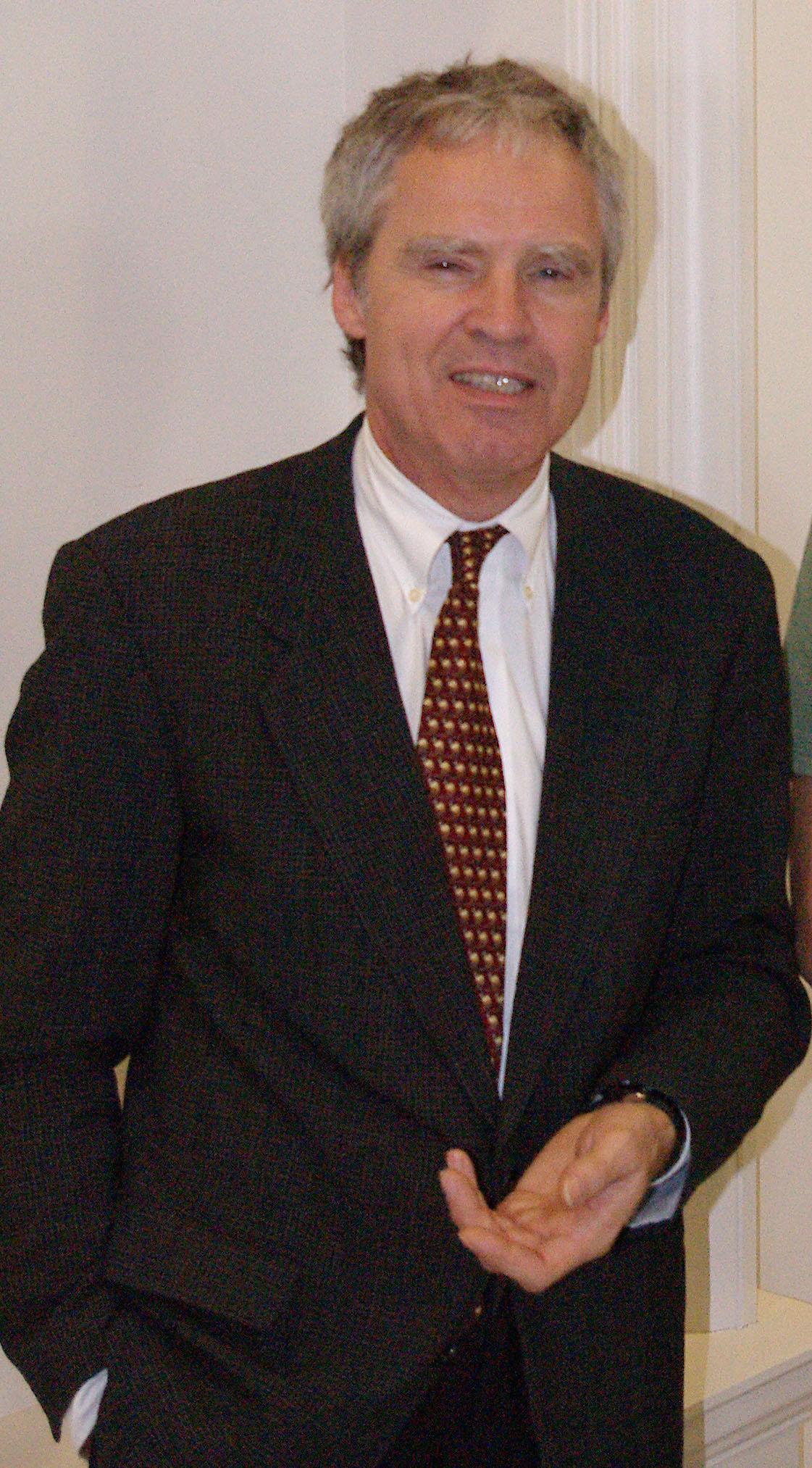
Horst Ludwig Störmer

- Horst Ludwig Störmer (born 1949), physicist and Nobel laureate
- Gert Trinklein (1949–2017), former professional football player
- P. J. Soles (born 1950), American film and television actress

==== 1951–1960 ====
- Hubert Buchberger (born 1951), violinist, conductor, and music university teacher
- Roman Bunka (1951–2022), guitarist and composer
- Martin Mosebach (born 1951), writer

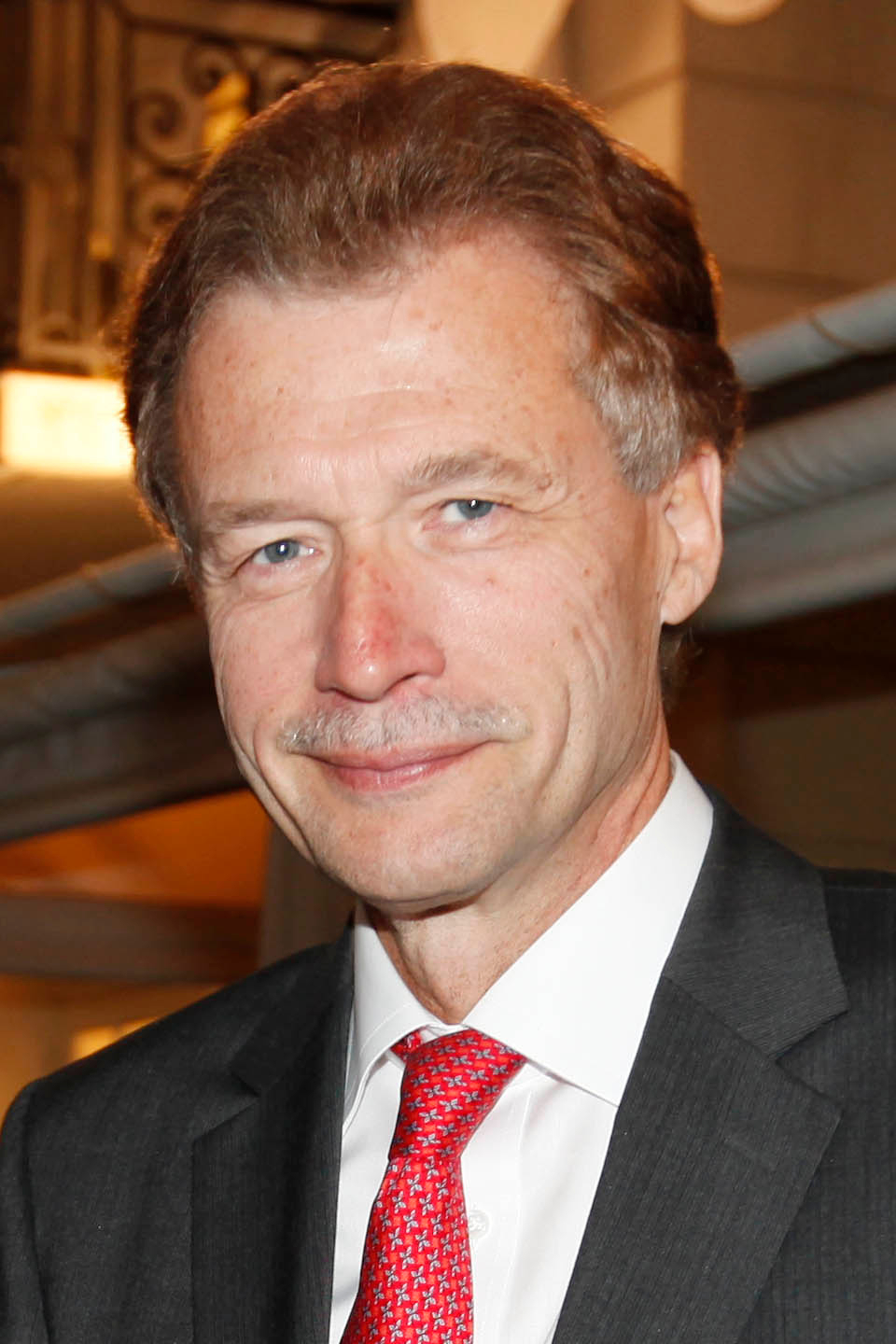
Peter Ammon

- Peter Ammon (born 1952), diplomat
- Cornelia Hanisch (born 1952), former fencer
- Johanna Lindsey (1952–2019), American writer of historical romance novels
- Susanne Porsche (born 1952), film producer
- Horst Stöcker (born 1952), theoretical physicist
- Lutz Kirchhof (born 1953), lutenist
- Stephan W. Koch (1953–2022), theoretical physicist
- Wolfgang Kraus (born 1953), former professional football player
- Dagmar Roth-Behrendt (born 1953), lawyer and politician
- Jan Zweyer (born 1953), writer

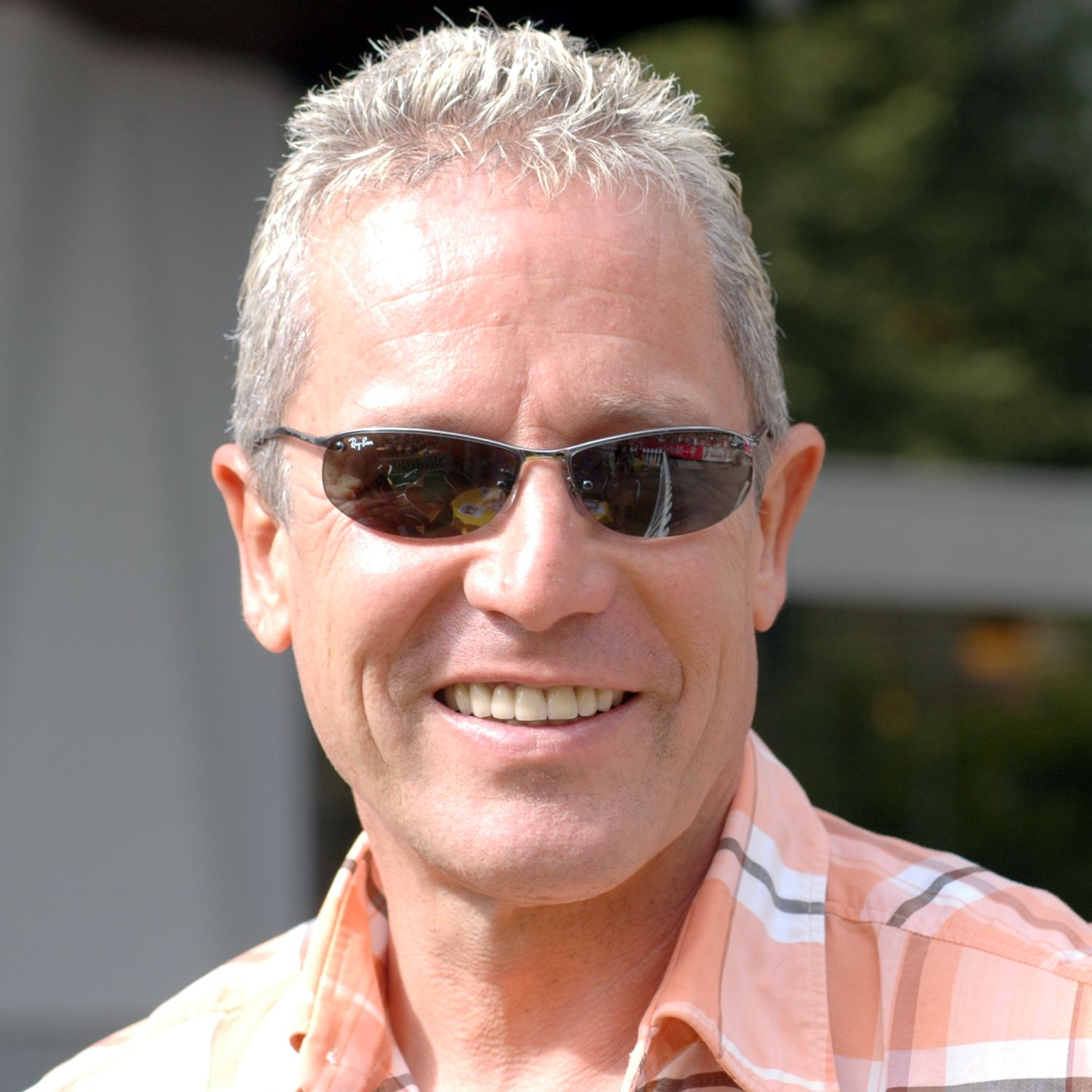
Dietrich Thurau

- Dietrich Thurau (born 1954), retired professional road bicycle racer
- Ellen von Unwerth (born 1954), photographer
- Uwe Benter (born 1955), rower
- Uli Lenz (born 1955), composer, pianist, and producer creating music in the modern jazz genre
- Michael Obst (born 1955), composer and pianist
- Ulrike Meyfarth (born 1956), former high jumper
- Ronny Borchers (born 1957), former footballer
- Keith McHenry (born 1957), activist and cofounder of Food Not Bombs
- Juliane Kokott (born 1957), Advocate General and professor
- Gerhard Weikum (born 1957), database researcher
- Hans Zimmer (born 1957), film composer and music producer
- Rainer Zitelmann (born 1957), historian, journalist, and management consultant
- Peter Becker (born 1958), molecular biologist
- Thomas Duis (born 1958), pianist
- Peter Kloeppel (born 1958), journalist and news anchor

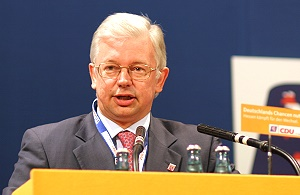
Roland Koch

- Roland Koch (born 1958), jurist and former conservative politician
- Thomas Metzinger (born 1958), philosopher and professor

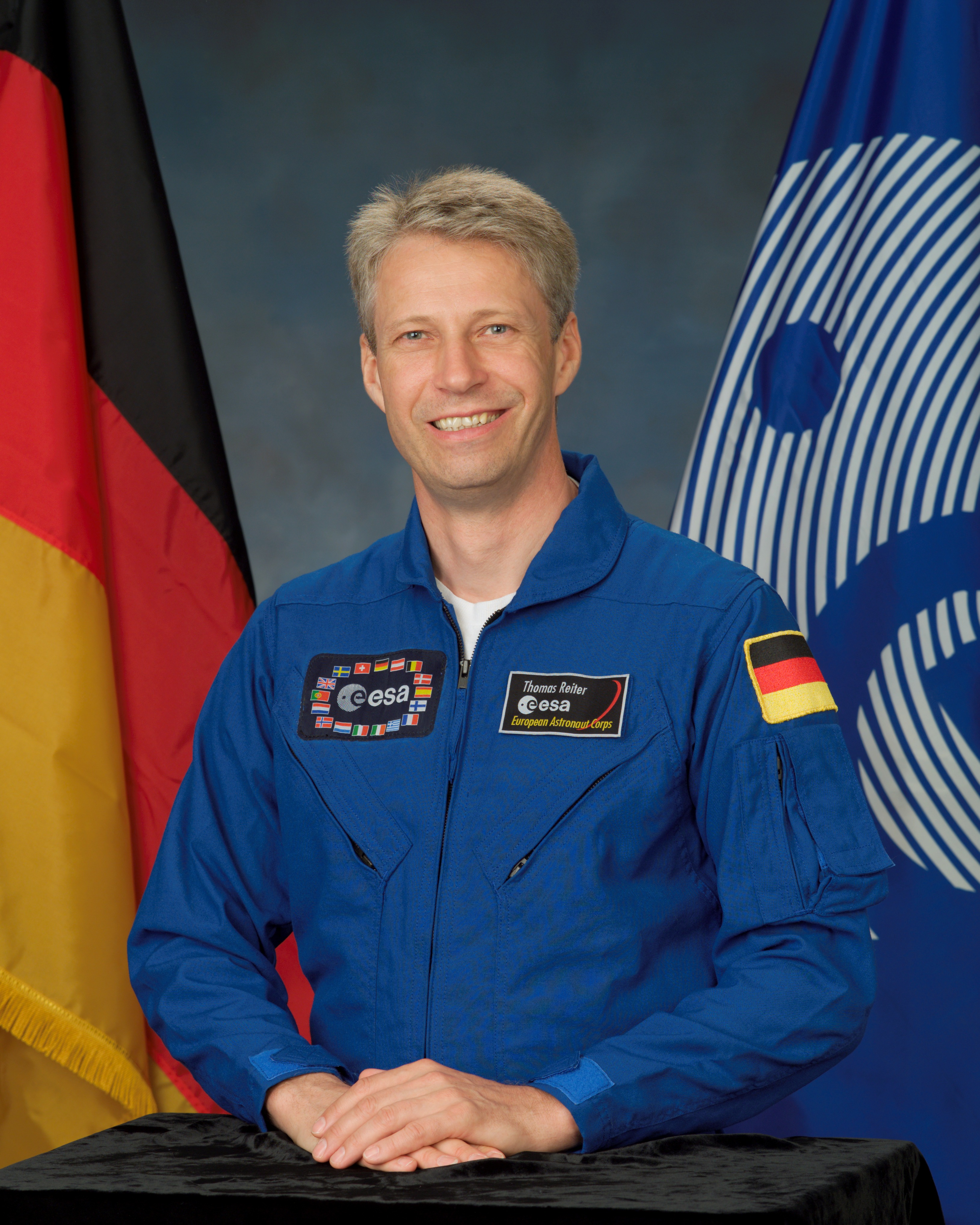
Thomas Reiter

- Thomas Reiter (born 1958), retired astronaut and test pilot
- Michael Scheffel (born 1958), Germanist
- Nicole Brown Simpson (1959–1994), ex-wife of professional football player O. J. Simpson
- Martina Hallmen (born 1959), former field hockey player
- Michael Sagmeister (born 1959), Jazz guitarist
- Pete Namlook (1960–2012), ambient and electronic-music producer and composer
- Christoph Franz (born 1960), former Chief Executive Officer of Lufthansa
- Michael Gahler (born 1960), politician and Member of the European Parliament

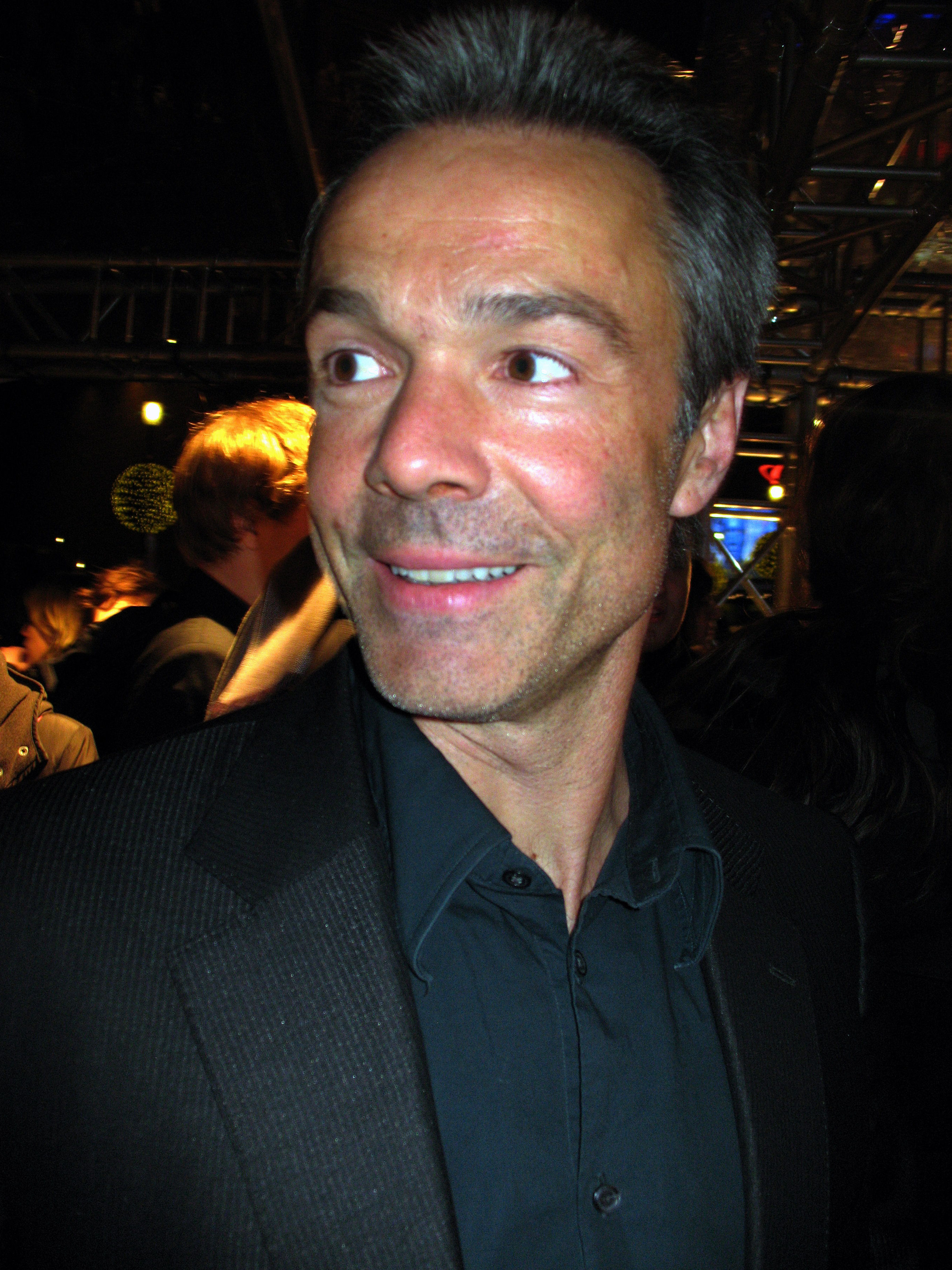
Hannes Jaenicke

- Hannes Jaenicke (born 1960), actor
- Gabriele Lesser (born 1960), historian and journalist
- Patricia Ott (born 1960), former field hockey player

==== 1961–1970 ====
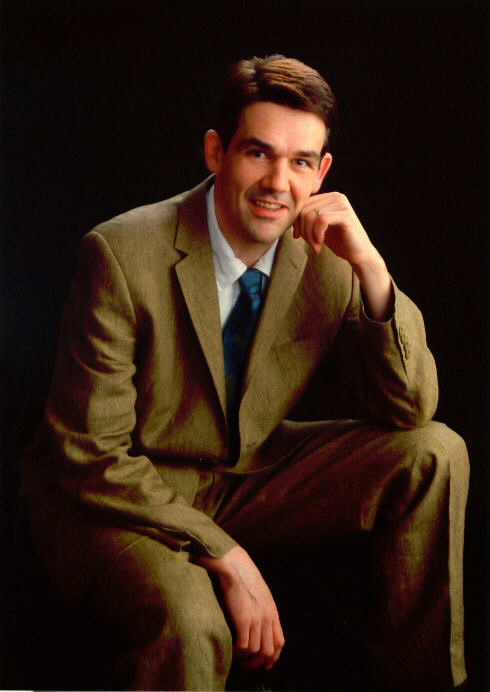
Valentin Schiedermair

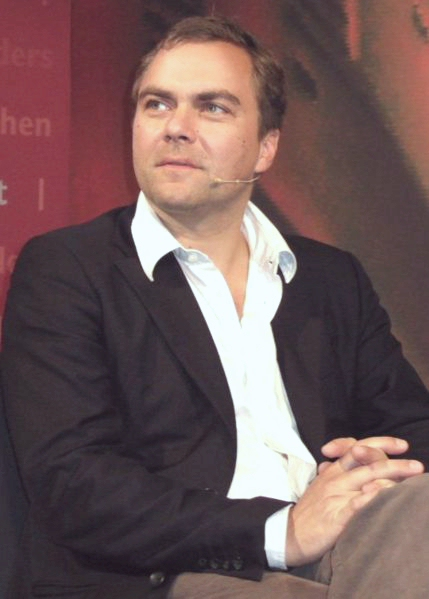
Jakob Arjouni

- Jens Geier (born 1961), politician
- Esther Schapira (born 1961), journalist and filmmaker
- Peter Blank (born 1962), javelin thrower
- Matthias Röhr (born 1962), guitarist
- Inaara Aga Khan (born 1963), second wife of the Aga Khan IV
- Ralf Falkenmayer (born 1963), former footballer
- Thor Kunkel (born 1963), author
- Charlotte Link (born 1963), writer
- Marcus Nispel (born 1963), film director and producer
- Valentin Schiedermair (born 1963), concert pianist
- Jakob Arjouni (1964–2013), author
- Beate Deininger (born 1964), former field hockey player
- Michael Gross (born 1964), swimmer
- Manfred Binz (born 1965), footballer
- Armin Kraaz (born 1965), football manager and former player
- Martin Lawrence (born 1965), American actor, comedian, and filmmaker

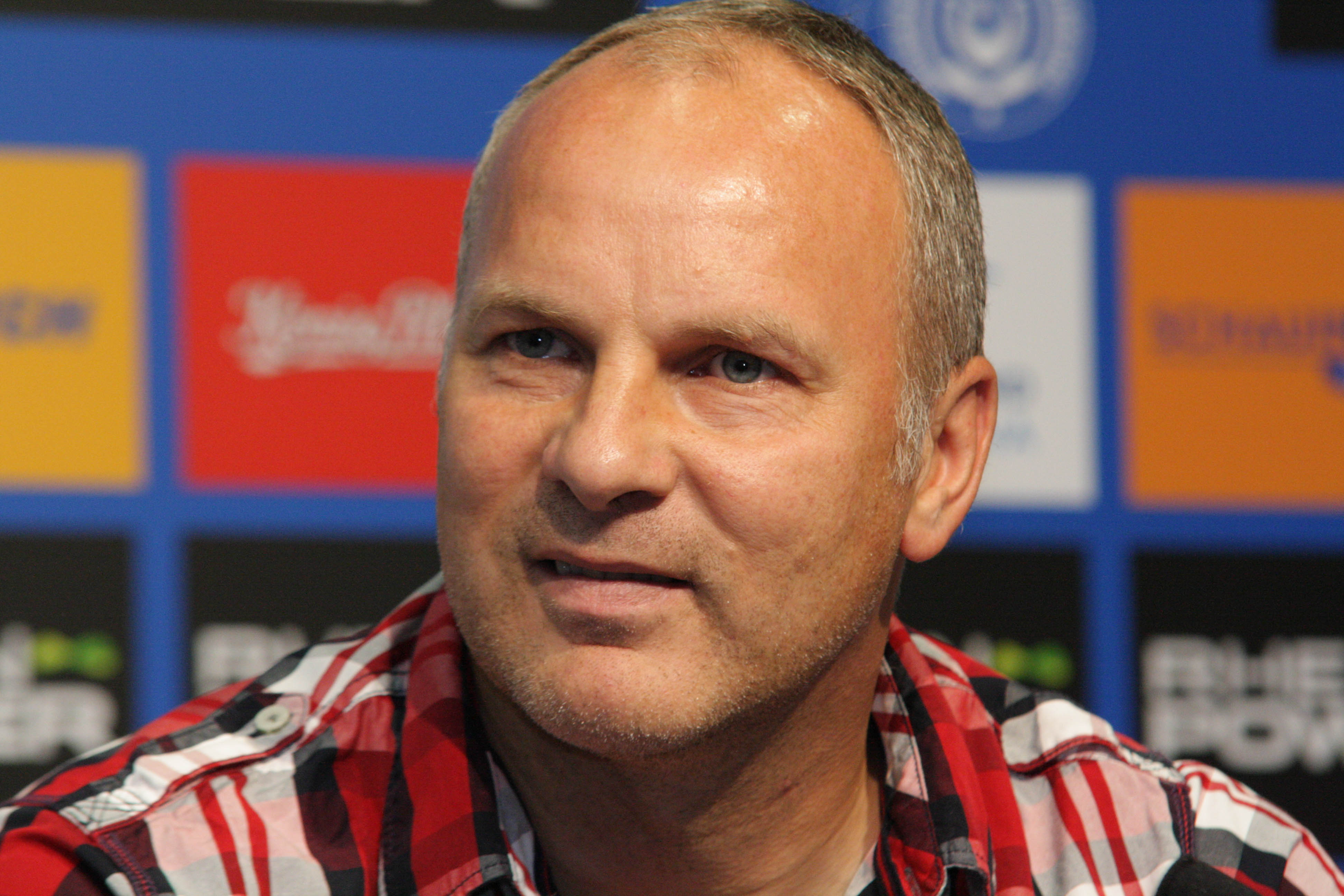
Oliver Reck

- Oliver Reck (born 1965), former footballer
- Christine Schäfer (born 1965), soprano
- Torsten de Winkel (born 1965), musician, composer, and philosopher
- Markus Löffel (1966–2006), disc jockey, musician, and record producer
- Eckhart Nickel (born 1966), journalist and author
- Stefan Quandt (born 1966), engineer and industrialist
- Sven Rothenberger (born 1966), equestrian
- Klaus Badelt (born 1967), composer
- Jens Beckert (born 1967), sociologist
- Antje Boetius (born 1967), marine biologist and professor of geomicrobiology
- Johannes Brandrup (born 1967), actor
- Katharina Hacker (born 1967), novelist

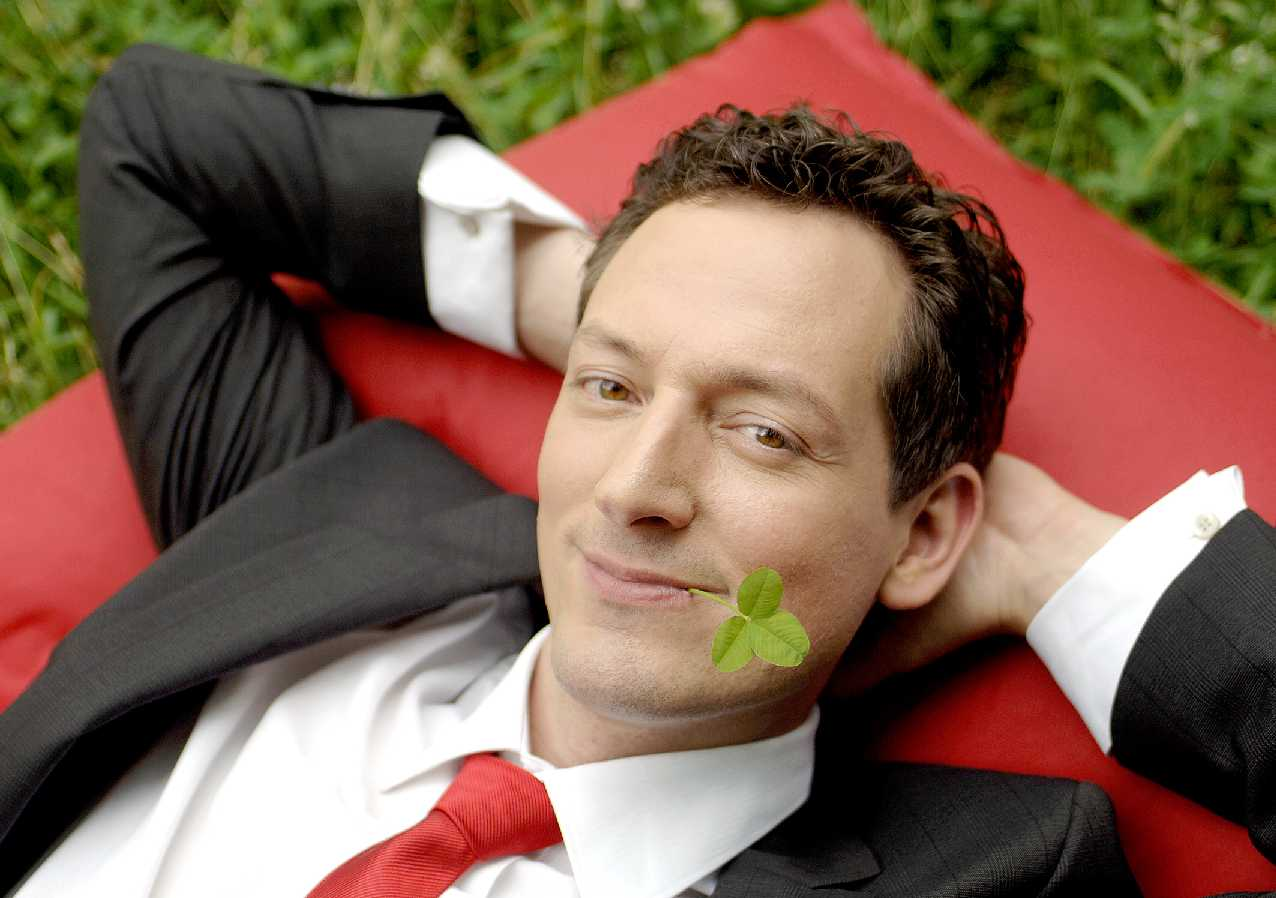
Eckart von Hirschhausen

- Eckart von Hirschhausen (born 1967), physician and comedian
- Annette Huber-Klawitter (born 1967), mathematician
- Peter Oliver Loew (born 1967), historian, translator, and scholar
- Stefan Mohr (born 1967), chess grandmaster
- Andreas Möller (born 1967), former internationalist association footballer
- Inka Parei (born 1967), writer

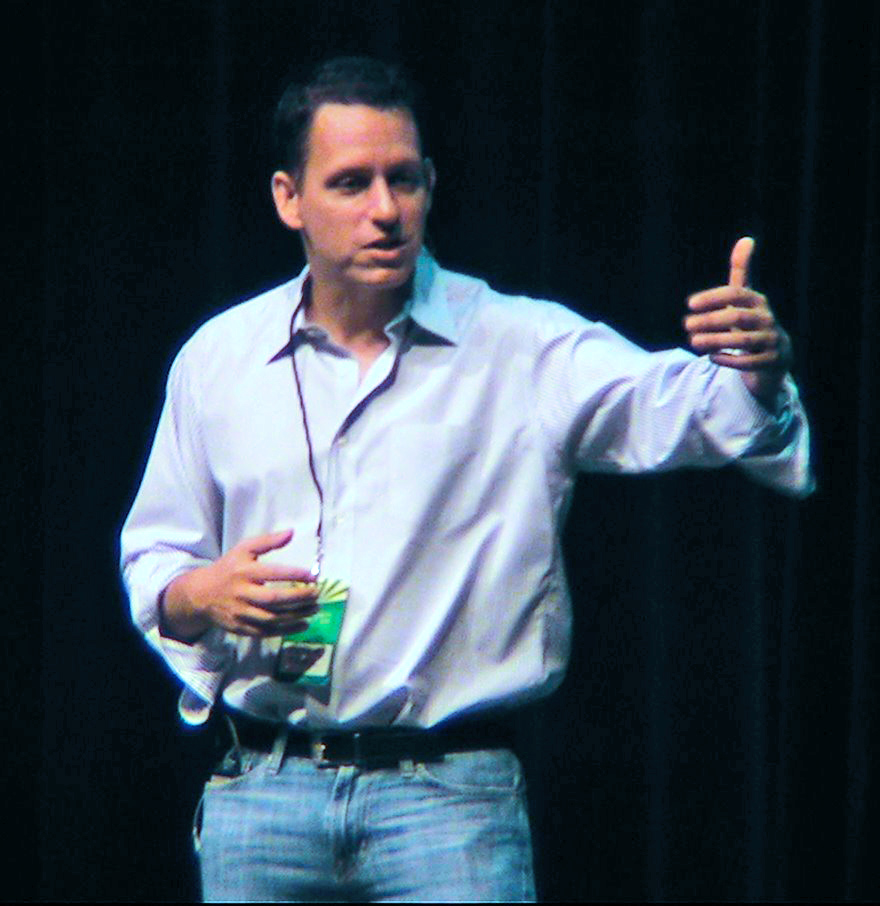
Peter Thiel

- Peter Thiel (born 1967), American entrepreneur, venture capitalist, and hedge fund manager
- Andreas Paulus (born 1968), jurist
- Uwe Schmidt (born 1968), composer, musician, and producer of electronic music

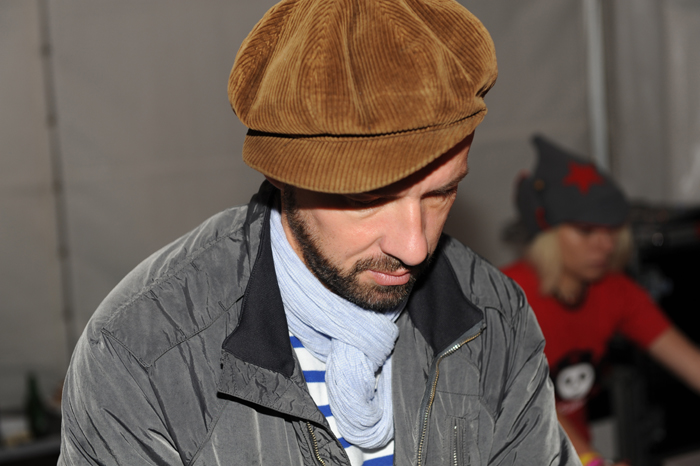
Shantel

- Shantel (born 1968), DJ and producer
- Carsten Arriens (born 1969), former professional tennis player
- Georgios Donis (born 1969), former professional football player
- Oliver Lieb (born 1969), electronic music producer and DJ
- Sarah Sorge (born 1969), politician
- Marc Trauner (born 1969), DJ and producer
- Thomas Zampach (born 1969), former professional footballer
- Jo Jo English (born 1970), American NBA basketball player, top scorer in the 1999–2000 Israel Basketball League
- Ronald Reng (born 1970), sports journalist and author
- Markus Rill (born 1970), singer-songwriter
- J. Peter Schwalm (born 1970), composer and music producer
- Simone Thomaschinski (born 1970), former professional field hockey defender

==== 1971–1980 ====
- Jochen Hippel (born 1971), musician
- Holger Kleinbub (born 1971), former professional volleyball player
- Slobodan Komljenović (born 1971), former Serbian footballer
- Moses Pelham (born 1971), rapper and musician
- Tony Richardson (born 1971), former American football fullback
- Alexander Schur (born 1971), former professional footballer
- Tré Cool (born 1972), American drummer
- Wilhelm Fischer (born 1972), boxer
- Steffi Jones (born 1972), former professional football defender
- Anthony Rother (born 1972), electronic music composer, producer, and label owner
- Kai Tracid (born 1972), trance DJ and producer
- Tilo Wolff (born 1972), musician
- Anna Carlsson (born 1973), actress and voice actress
- Anna Henckel-Donnersmarck (born 1973), filmmaker and film curator
- Klark Kent (born 1973), graffiti artist and music producer
- Sonya Kraus (born 1973), television presenter and former model
- Christopher Reitz (born 1973), professional field hockey goalkeeper
- Kaya Yanar (born 1973), comedian
- Michael Aničić (born 1974), former professional football player
- Matthias Becker (born 1974), former professional football player
- Magnus Gäfgen (born 1974), child murderer
- Sinan Şamil Sam (born 1974), Turkish heavyweight professional boxer
- Sabrina Setlur (born 1974), singer, rapper, songwriter and occasional actress
- Julia Voss (born 1974), journalist and scientific historian
- Mandala Tayde (born 1975), award-winning actress and model

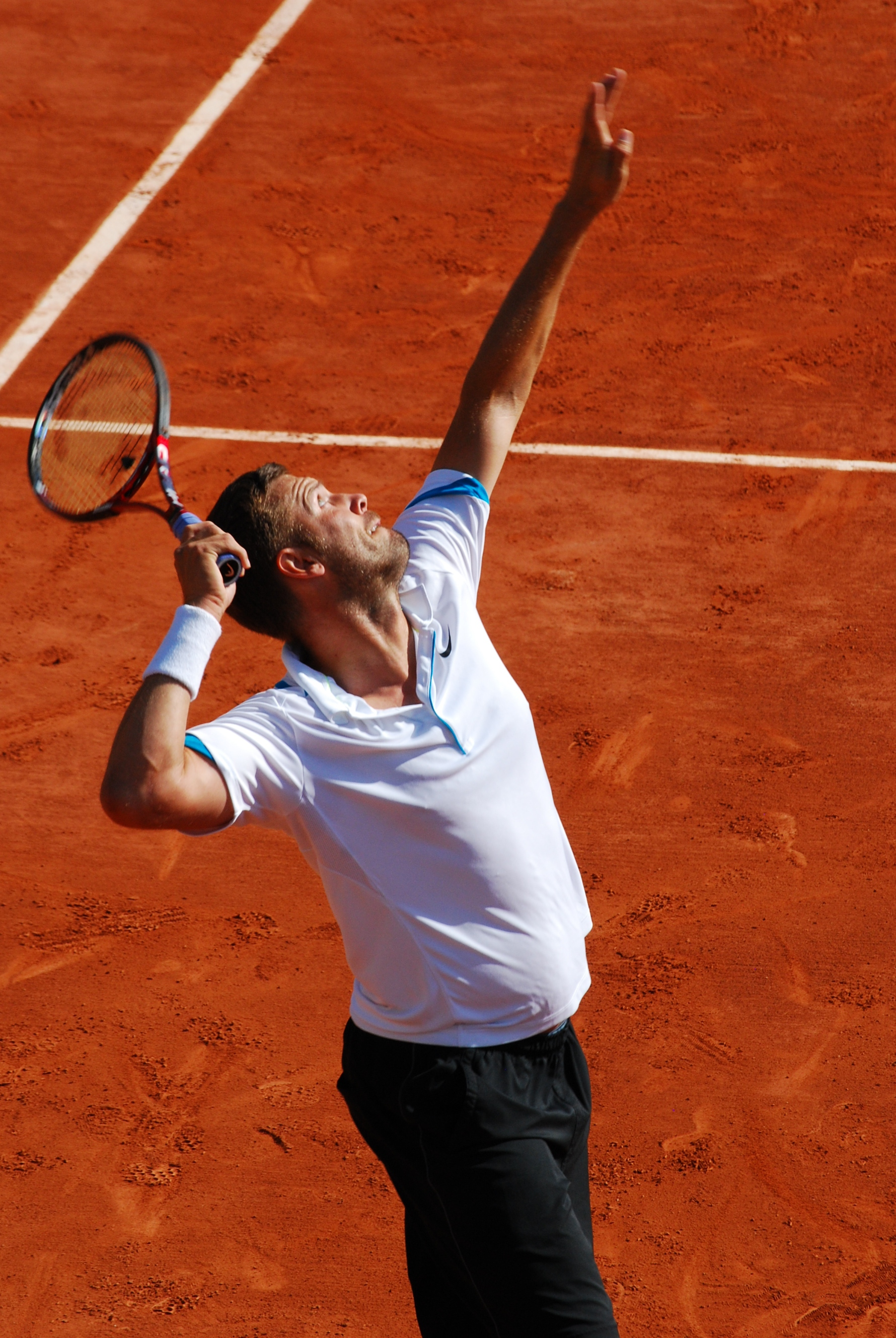
Alexander Waske

- Alexander Waske (born 1975), former professional tennis player
- Daniel Dölschner (born 1976), poet and Haiku-writer
- Tamara Milosevic (born 1976), documentary filmer
- Michael Thurk (born 1976), professional football player
- Sascha Amstätter (born 1977), professional football player
- Birgit Prinz (born 1977), former female professional association football player
- Sandra Smisek (born 1977), former female professional football player
- Edwin Thomas (born 1977), English historical novelist
- Jo Weil (born 1977), actor
- Daniel Hartwich (born 1978), actor
- Hartmut Honka (born 1978), conservative politician
- Susanne Keil (born 1978), female hammer thrower

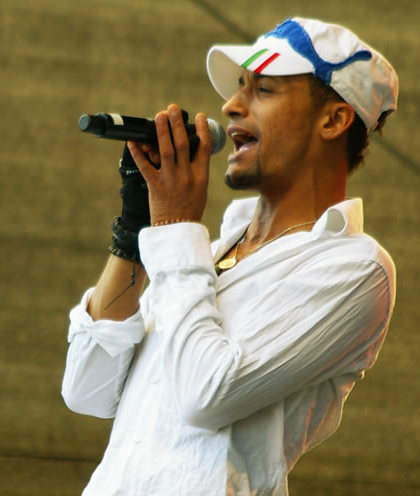
Mark Medlock

- Mark Medlock (born 1978), singer
- Souad Mekhennet (born 1978), journalist
- Heinz Müller (born 1978), professional footballer
- Silke Müller (born 1978), award-winning field hockey midfielder
- Ruben Studdard (born 1978), American R&B, pop, and gospel singer
- Meike Freitag (born 1979), former female swimmer
- Senna Gammour (born 1979), singer-songwriter and entertainer
- Jonesmann (born 1979), rapper

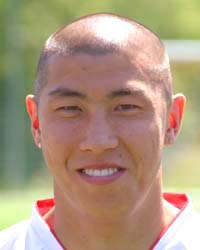
Cha Du-ri

- Sharice Davids (born 1980), U.S. representative for Kansas
- Cha Du-ri (born 1980), South Korean professional footballer
- Bakary Diakité (born 1980), German-Malian professional footballer
- Patrick Falk (born 1980), professional footballer
- Daniel Gunkel (born 1980), professional footballer
- Giorgos Theodoridis (born 1980), Greek international footballer
- Zaytoven (born 1980), American hip hop DJ and producer

==== 1981–1990 ====
- Giuseppe Gemiti (born 1981), professional footballer

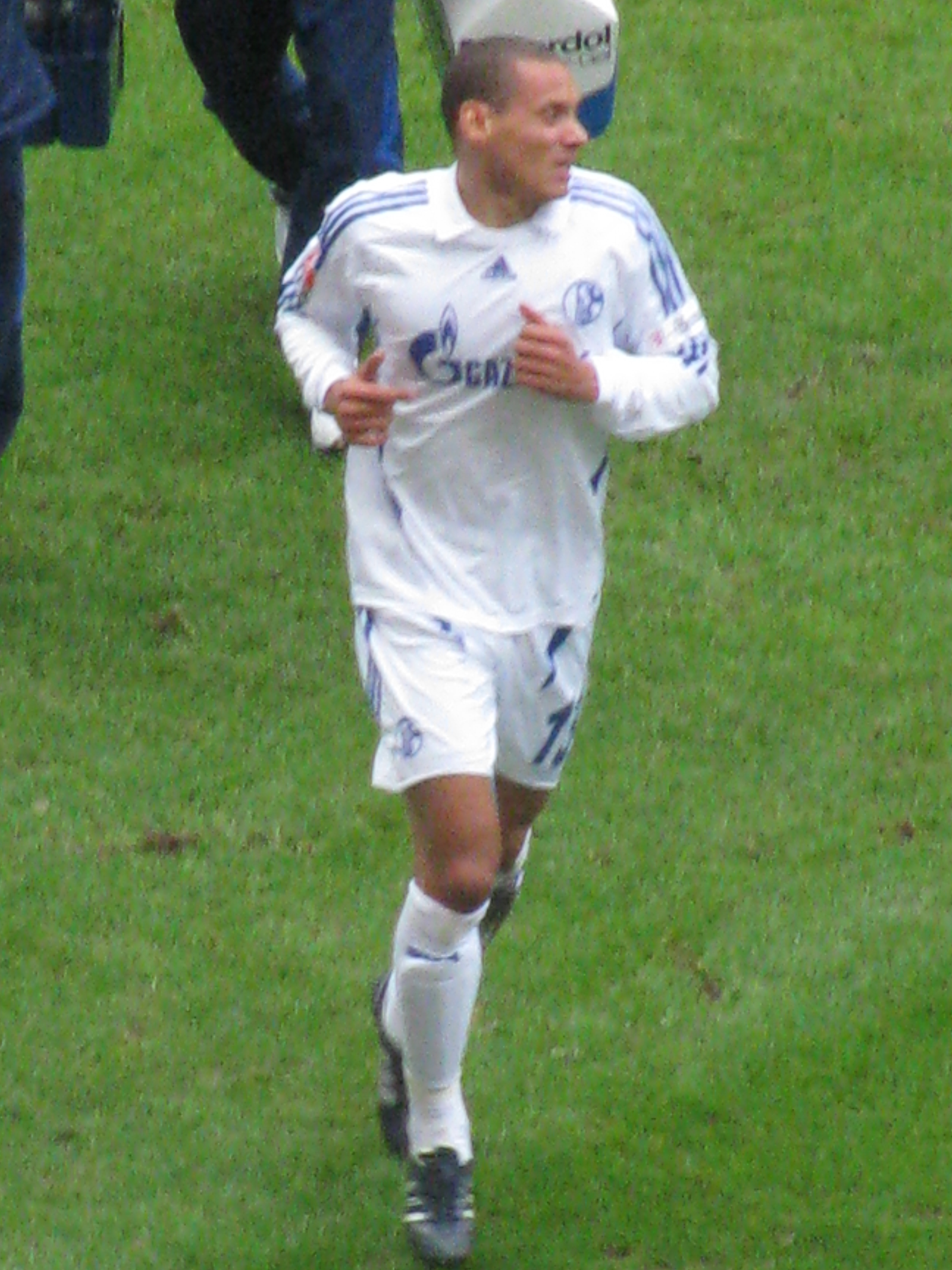
Jermaine Jones

- Jermaine Jones (born 1981), German-American professional soccer player
- Saskia Bartusiak (born 1982), professional footballer
- Nadja Benaissa (born 1982), recording artist, television personality, and occasional actress
- Marijana Marković (born 1982), épée fencer
- Carlos Nevado (born 1982), professional field hockey player
- Patric Klandt (born 1983), professional footballer
- Madeleine Sandig (born 1983), professional road and track racing cyclist
- Pia Eidmann (born 1984), professional field hockey player

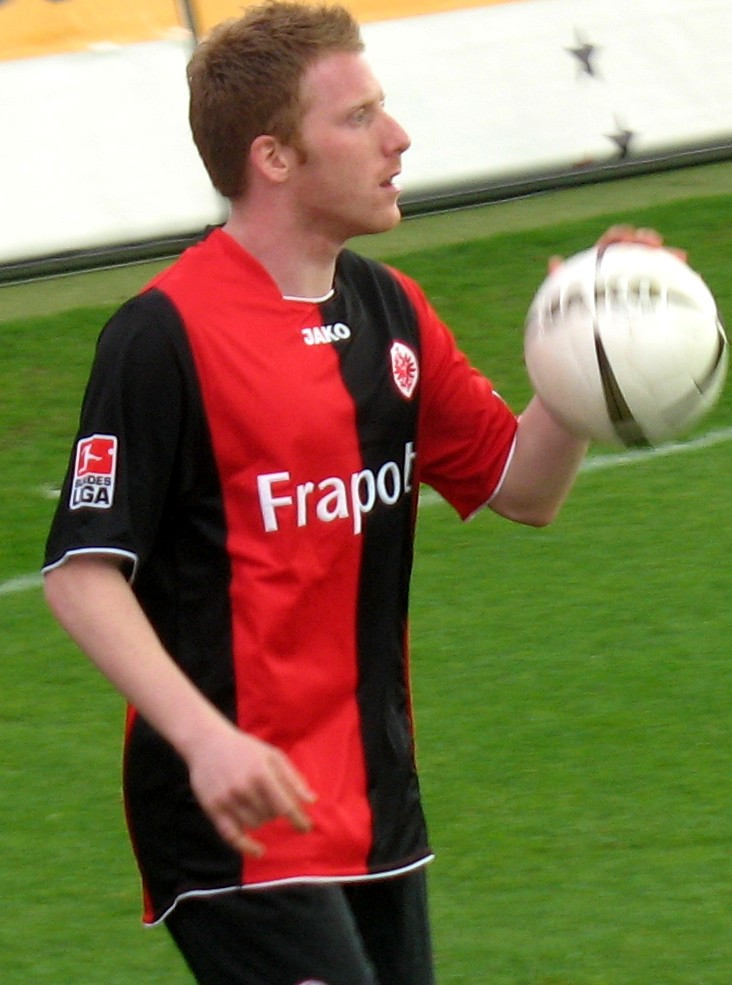
Patrick Ochs

- Patrick Ochs (born 1984), professional footballer
- Fouad Brighache (born 1985), German-Moroccan professional footballer
- J. Cole (born 1985), American hip hop recording artist, songwriter, and record producer
- Fikri El Haj Ali (born 1985), professional footballer
- Christian Kum (born 1985), German-Dutch professional footballer
- Mounir Chaftar (born 1986), professional football defender
- Tim Kister (born 1986), professional footballer
- Moritz Müller (born 1986), professional ice hockey defenceman
- Jan-André Sievers (born 1987), professional football player
- Uğur Albayrak (born 1988), Turkish professional footballer
- Niklas Andersen (born 1988), professional football defender
- Lisa Bund (born 1988), pop singer, songwriter, radio host, actor, and reality television star
- Stefan Hickl (born 1988), professional footballer
- Tru Valentino (born 1988), American actor
- Timm Klose (born 1988), German-Swiss professional footballer
- Björn Thurau (born 1988), professional cyclist
- Richard Weil (born 1988), professional footballer
- Marius Ostrowski (born 1988), historian
- Semih Aydilek (born 1989), German-Turkish professional footballer

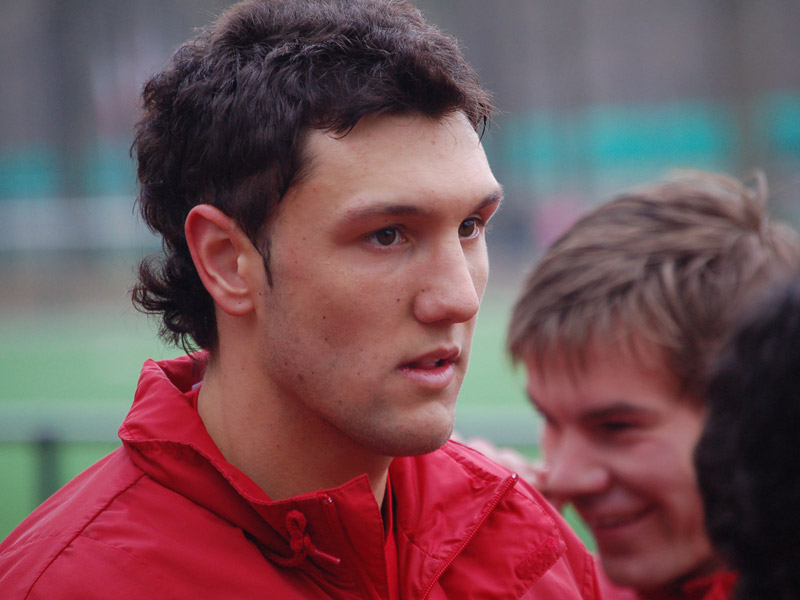
Kevin Pezzoni

- Kevin Pezzoni (born 1989), professional footballer
- Marcel Titsch-Rivero (born 1989), professional footballer
- Timothy Chandler (born 1990), German-American professional footballer who represented the United States national team
- Steffen Fäth (born 1990), professional handball player
- Jan Kirchhoff (born 1990), professional footballer
- Romero Osby (born 1990), American professional basketball player for Maccabi Kiryat Gat of the Israeli Basketball Premier League

==== 1991–2000 ====
- Daniel Döringer (born 1991), professional footballer
- Daniel Henrich (born 1991), professional footballer
- Namika (born 1991), German-Moroccan singer and rapper
- Leon Bunn (born 1992), boxer
- Max Ehmer (born 1992), professional footballer
- Markus Hofmeier (born 1993), professional footballer
- Alice Merton (born 1993), singer
- Emre Can (born 1994), professional footballer

== Notable residents of Frankfurt ==
=== 8th to 17th centuries ===
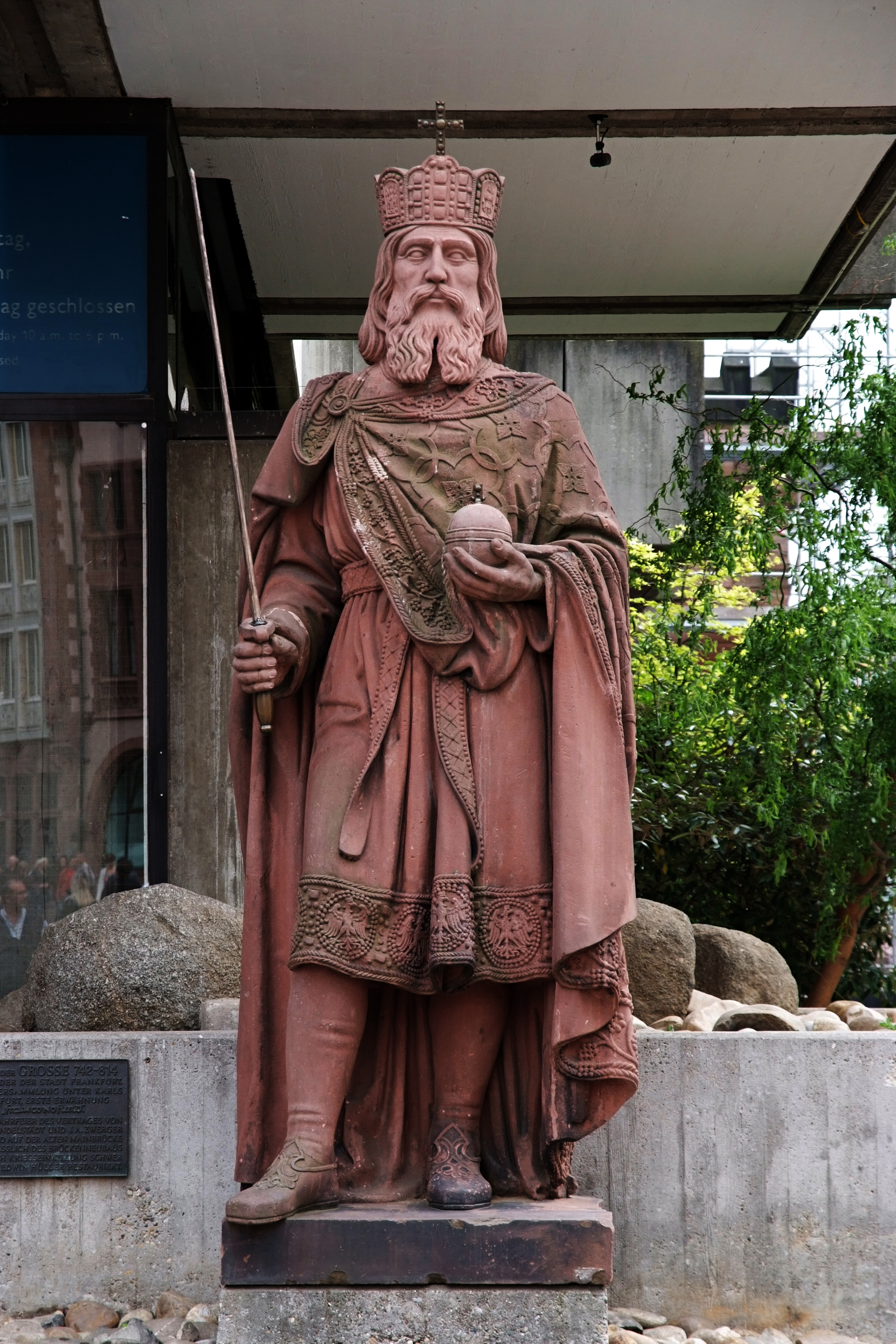
Charlemagne

- Charlemagne (born between 742 and 748; died 814), King of the Franks who united most of Western Europe during the Middle Ages and laid the foundations for modern France and Germany
- Fastrada (765–794), East Frankish noblewoman

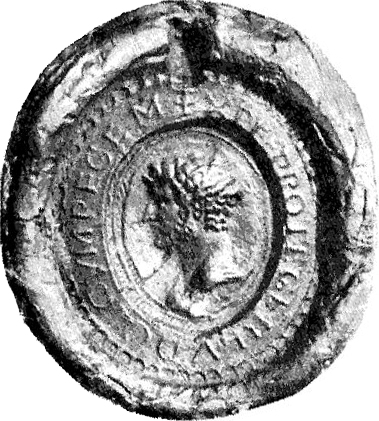
Louis the German

- Louis the German (c. 810–876), grandson of Charlemagne and third son of the succeeding Frankish Emperor Louis the Pious and his first wife, Ermengarde of Hesbaye
- Louis the Younger (born between 830 and 835; died 882), second eldest son of Louis the German and Emma who succeeded his father as King of Saxony and his elder brother Carloman as King of Bavaria
- Johannes von Soest (1448–1506), composer, theorist, and poet
- Conrad Faber von Kreuznach (born c. 1500; died between 1552 and 1553), painter and woodcuts designer
- Jacob Micyllus (1503–1558), Renaissance humanist and teacher
- Adam Lonicer (1528–1586), botanist
- Giordano Bruno (1548–1600), Italian Dominican friar, philosopher, mathematician, poet, and astrologer

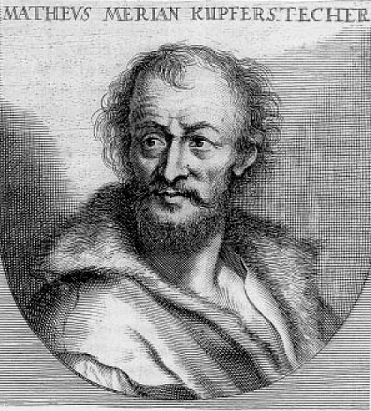
Matthäus Merian

- Matthäus Merian (1593–1650), Swiss-born engraver and publisher
- Johann Schröder (1600–1664), physician and pharmacologist
- Jacob Joshua Falk (1680–1756), Talmudist, served as chief rabbi of Frankfurt
- Georg Philipp Telemann (1681–1767), Baroque composer and multi-instrumentalist

=== 18th century ===
- Johann Philipp Bethmann (1715–1793), merchant and banker
- Simon Moritz Bethmann (1721–1782), merchant and banker
- Pinchas Horowitz (1731–1805), rabbi
- Johann Christian Friedrich Hæffner (1759–1833), composer
- Sekl Loeb Wormser (1768–1846), rabbi
- Clemens Brentano (1778–1842), poet, novelist, and major figure of German Romanticism
- Karoline von Günderrode (1780–1806), Romantic poet

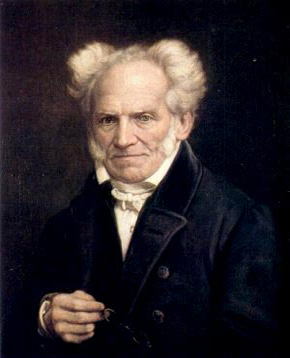
Arthur Schopenhauer

- Arthur Schopenhauer (1788–1860), philosopher

=== 19th century ===
- Rudolf Christian Böttger (1806–1881), inorganic chemist
- Samson Raphael Hirsch (1808–1888), rabbi
- Johann von Miquel (1828–1901), statesman
- Leopold Sonnemann (1831–1909), journalist, newspaper publisher, and political party leader
- Charles Hallgarten (1838–1908), banker and philanthropist
- Paul Ehrlich (1854–1915), physician and scientist who worked in the fields of hematology, immunology, and chemotherapy
- Engelbert Humperdinck (1854–1921), composer
- Bertha Pappenheim (1859–1936), Austrian-Jewish feminist, social pioneer, and founder of the Jüdischer Frauenbund (League of Jewish Women)
- Adolf Bartels (1862–1945), journalist and poet
- Alois Alzheimer (1864–1915), Bavarian-born psychiatrist and neuropathologist credited with identifying the first published case of "presenile dementia", later identified as Alzheimer's disease
- Georg Voigt (1866–1927), politician
- Ludwig Landmann (1868–1945), liberal politician
- Oskar Ursinus (1877–1952), aerospace engineer
- Max Beckmann (1884–1950), painter, draftsman, printmaker, sculptor, and writer
- Magda Spiegel (1887–1944), contralto
- Oswald von Nell-Breuning (1890–1991), Roman Catholic theologian and sociologist
- Franz Bronstert (1895–1967), engineer and painter
- Max Horkheimer (1895–1973), philosopher and sociologist

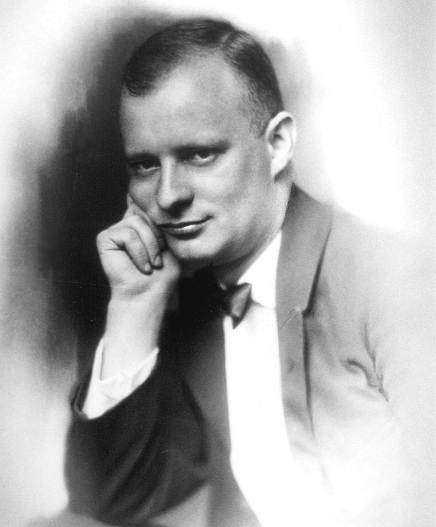
Paul Hindemith

- Paul Hindemith (1895–1963), composer, violist, violinist, teacher, and conductor
- Ludwig Erhard (1897–1977), politician affiliated with the CDU and Chancellor of the Federal Republic of Germany (West Germany) from 1963 until 1966
- Margarete Schütte-Lihotzky (1897–2000), first female Austrian architect and an activist in the Nazi resistance movement

=== 20th century ===
==== 1901–1910 ====
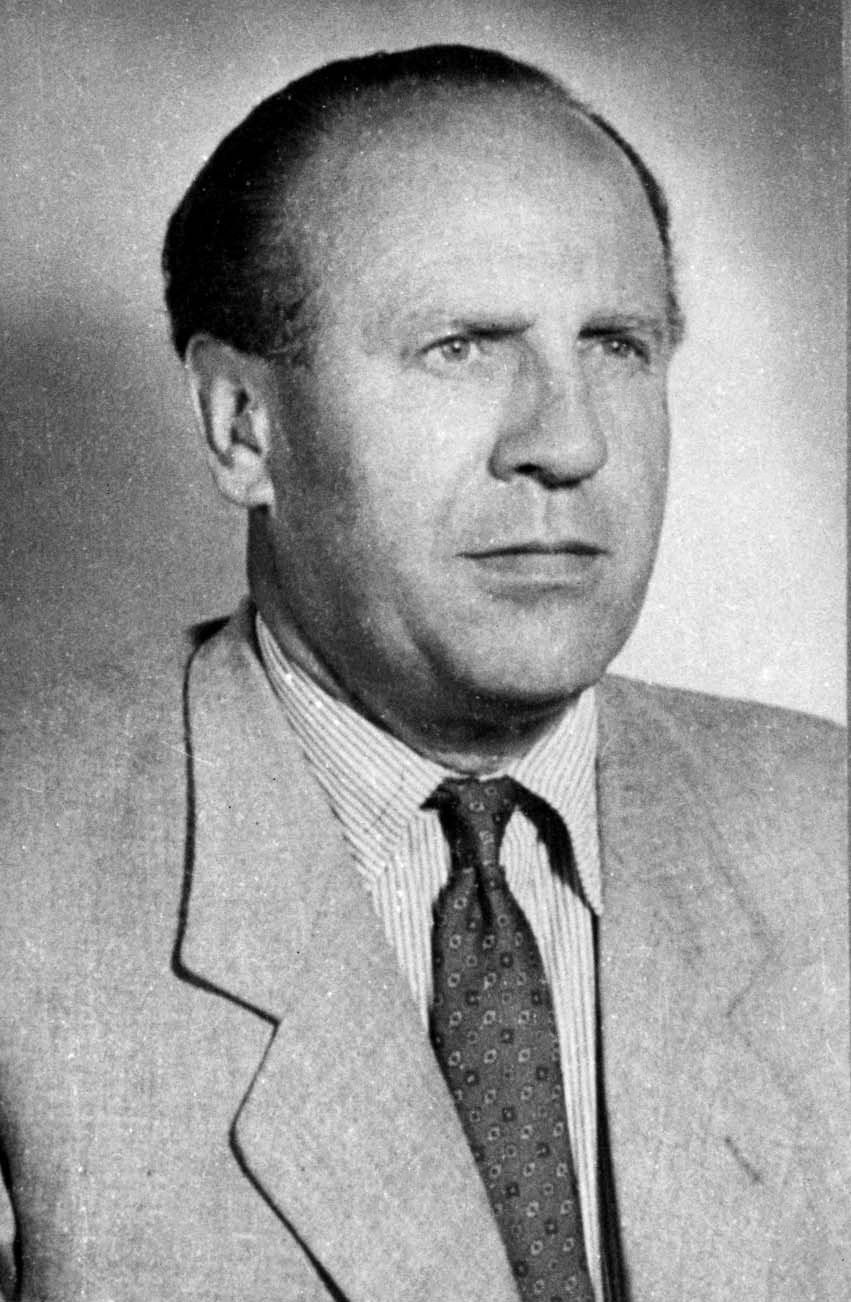
Oskar Schindler

- Kurt Thomas (1904–1973), composer, conductor, and music educator
- Hans Bethe (1906–2005), German–American nuclear physicist
- Oskar Schindler (1908–1974), industrialist, spy, and member of the Nazi Party who is credited with saving the lives of 1,200 Jews during the Holocaust
- Alexander Mitscherlich (1908–1982), psychologist
- Bernhard Grzimek (1909–1987), Silesian-German zoo director, zoologist, book author, editor, and animal conservationist

==== 1911–1920 ====
- Josef Neckermann (1912–1992), equestrian and Olympic champion
- Margarete Mitscherlich-Nielsen (1917–2012), psychoanalyst
- Horst Krüger (1919–1999), novelist
- Marcel Reich-Ranicki (1920–2013), Polish-born literary critic and member of the literary group Gruppe 47

==== 1921–1930 ====
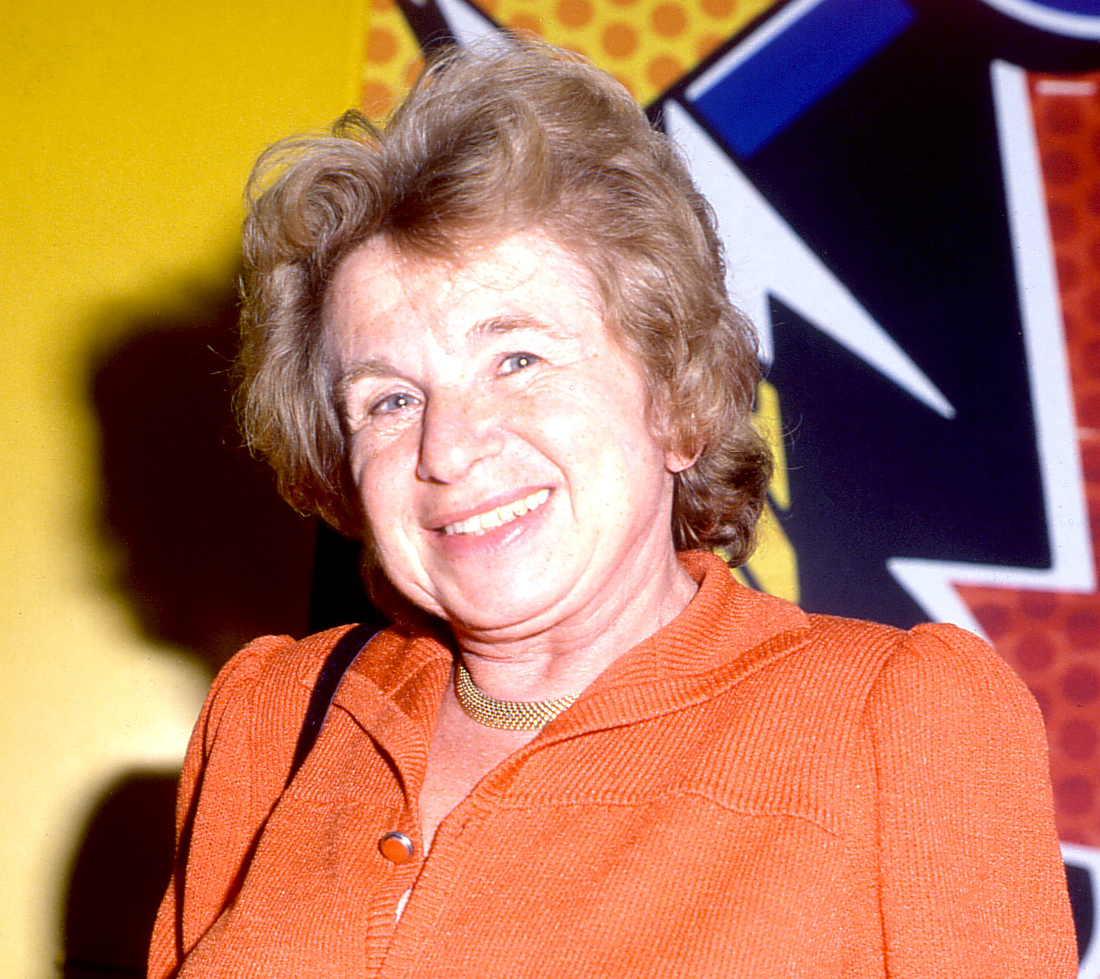
Dr. Ruth Westheimer

- Reinhard Goerdeler (1922–1996), accountant instrumental in founding KPMG, a leading international firm of accountants
- Arno Lustiger (1924–2012), historian and author
- Horst Streckenbach (1925–2001), tattoo artist and historian of the medium
- Hilmar Hoffmann (1925–2018), cultural functionary and director
- Ignatz Bubis (1927–1999), chairman (and later president) of the Central Council of Jews in Germany (Zentralrat der Juden in Deutschland)
- Ruth Westheimer (born Karola Siegel; 1928–2024), German-American sex therapist, talk show host, author, Doctor of Education, Holocaust survivor, and former Haganah sniper.
- Karl-Hermann Flach (1929–1973), journalist of the Frankfurter Rundschau, and a politician of the liberal Free Democrats (FDP)
- Jürgen Habermas (born 1929), sociologist and philosopher in the tradition of critical theory and pragmatism
- Helmut Kohl (1930–2017), conservative politician and statesman

==== 1931–1940 ====
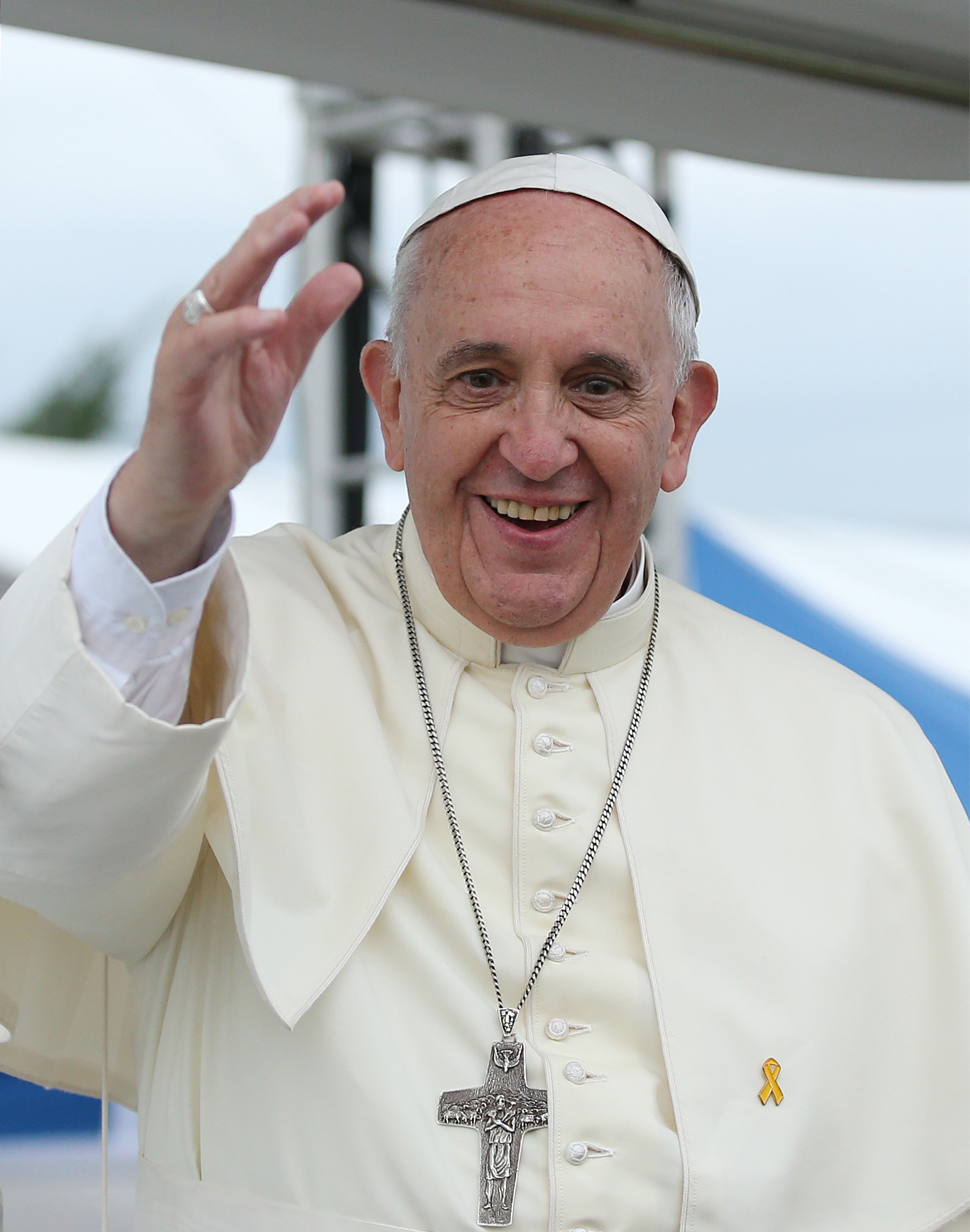
Pope Francis

- Alfred Schmidt (1931–2012), philosopher
- Walter Wallmann (1932–2013), politician
- Rosemarie Nitribitt (1933–1957), luxury call girl whose violent death caused a scandal in the Wirtschaftswunder years
- Michael Grzimek (1934–1959), zoologist, conservationist, and filmmaker
- Albert Speer Jr. (1934–2017), architect and urban planner
- Pope Francis (born Jorge Mario Bergoglio, 1936), pope of the Catholic Church, spent several months at the Sankt Georgen Graduate School of Philosophy and Theology in Frankfurt
- F. K. Waechter (1937–2005), cartoonist, author, and playwright
- Robert Gernhardt (1937–2006), writer, painter, caricaturist, and poet
- Barbara Klemm (born 1939), photographer, worked for Frankfurter Allgemeine Zeitung for 45 years

==== 1941–1950 ====
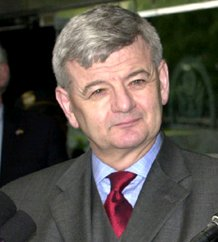
Joschka Fischer

- Jürgen Grabowski (1944–2022), former football player
- Petra Roth (born 1944), mayor of Frankfurt from 1995 to 2012
- Daniel Cohn-Bendit (born 1945), politician
- Bernd Hölzenbein (born 1946), former football player
- Johannes Weinrich (born 1947), left-wing political militant and terrorist
- Josef Ackermann (born 1948), Swiss banker and former chief executive officer of Deutsche Bank
- Joschka Fischer (born 1948), politician
- Alfred 23 Harth (born 1949), multimedia artist, band leader, multi-instrumentalist musician, and composer

==== 1951–2000 ====
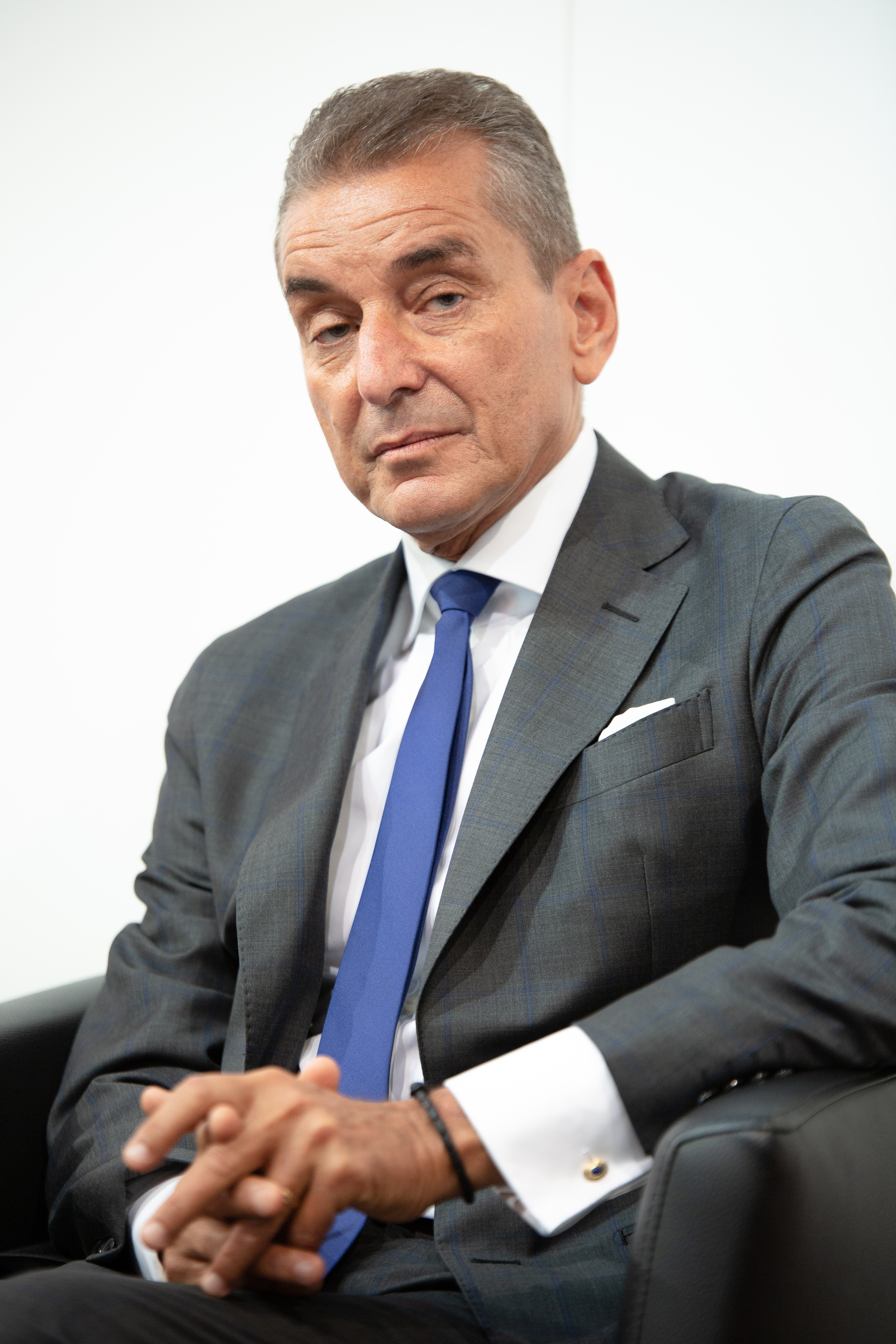
Michel Friedman

- Armin S., independent securities trader
- Ahron Daum (born 1951), rabbi, professor, author, and educator
- Cha Bum-kun (born 1953), South Korean football manager and former player
- Michel Friedman (born 1956), lawyer, former CDU politician, and talk show host
- Hans Zimmer (born 1957), film score composer and music producer
- Wolfgang Herold (born 1961), film producer and sound supervisor
- Luca Anzilotti (born 1963), Italian DJ/producer of electronic music
- Stephan Weidner (born 1963), musician and music producer
- Heike Matthiesen (1964–2023), classical guitarist
- Sven Väth (born 1964), DJ/producer in electronic music
- Dave McClain (born 1965), drummer
- D-Flame (born 1971), hip hop and reggae musician
- Azad (born 1974), rapper
- Renate Lingor (born 1975), female former international football player
- Pia Wunderlich (born 1975), football midfielder
- Aslı Bayram (born 1981), actress and writer
- Christoph Mikuschek (born 1988), politician

== See also ==
- Frankfurt School
- List of mayors of Frankfurt
- List of Eintracht Frankfurt players
