= 1998–99 Eintracht Frankfurt season =

Eintracht Frankfurt
1998–99 season
- Chairman: Rolf Heller
- Manager: Horst Ehrmantraut (resigned 8 December 1998); Bernhard Lippert (caretaker from 8 December until 19 December 1998); Reinhold Fanz (appointed 22 December 1998, resigned 18 April 1999); Jörg Berger (appointed 19 April 1999)
- Bundesliga: 15th
- DFB-Pokal: Second round
- Top goalscorer: League: Yang Chen (8); All: Yang Chen (9)
- Highest home attendance: 58,500 (vs Bayern Munich, 31 October)
- Lowest home attendance: 17,000 (vs MSV Duisburg, 19 December)
- Average home league attendance: 23,647
Home colours	Away colours

The 1998–99 Eintracht Frankfurt season was the 99th season in the club's football history. In 1998–99 the club played in the Bundesliga, the top tier of German football. It was the club's 97th season in the first tier and the club's first season back in the Bundesliga, having been promoted from the 2. Bundesliga in 1997–1998 season.

The season ended on a final matchday when Eintracht secured their Bundesliga spot on day 34.

Prior to the last match far behind Eintracht won three matches in a row. Eintracht hosted reigning champions Kaiserslautern, who were contending for a Champions League spot, on the last matchday. The match ended 5-1 and sent Nürnberg down to the 2. Bundesliga on goal difference. The ultimate goal was scored by Jan Åge Fjørtoft, who scored one of the most famous Bundesliga goals in the 89th minute when performing a step-over right in front of Lautern's goalkeeper Andreas Reinke before marking Eintracht's fifth goal.

== Results ==
=== Friendlies ===
Win Draw Loss

10 July 1998	TSG Idstein	1–8	Eintracht Frankfurt	Idstein, Germany
	Winter 21'	(Report)	Sobotzik 2'; Yang 20'; Edmílson (guest player) 27', 30'; B Schneider 52'; Brinkmann 63' (pen.); Epp 78'; Kutschera 83'	Stadium: Sportanlage in der Zissenheim; Attendance: 2,300; Referee: Reuter

11 July 1998	SV Sailauf	1–5	Eintracht Frankfurt	Sailauf, Germany
	Fiebrich	(Report)	Edmílson (guest player) 17', 38', 45'; Brinkmann 43'; Sobotzik 86'	Stadium: Sportanlage am Bischling; Attendance: 1,200

15 July 1998	FSV Frankfurt	1–4	Eintracht Frankfurt	Frankfurt, Germany
	Rüppel 80' (pen.)	(Report)	Weber 5'; B Schneider 47'; Gerster 73'; Yang 81'	Stadium: Stadion am Bornheimer Hang; Attendance: 4,000

18 July 1998	Eschwege XI	1–10	Eintracht Frankfurt	Meinhard, Germany
16:00 CEST	Löffler 73'	(Report)	Westerthaler 8', 18', 29', 39'; Sobotzik 28'; Epp 58', 86'; Stojak 63', 67', 90'	Attendance: 1,900; Referee: Linnenberg

21 July 1998	Waldhof Mannheim	1–0	Eintracht Frankfurt	Erbach, Germany
19:00 CEST	Vukčević 25'	(Report)		Stadium: Sportpark Erbach; Attendance: 5,000

26 July 1998	Maccabi Haifa	1–2	Eintracht Frankfurt	Zirl, Austria
	Vilner 85'	(Report)	Elkayam 67' (o.g.); Westerthaler 68'	Attendance: 300

28 July 1998	RCD Mallorca	1–1	Eintracht Frankfurt	Kössen, Austria
	Dani 79' (pen.)	(Report)	Yang 83'	Stadium: Sportanlage Kössen; Attendance: 1,200

5 August 1998	KSV Klein-Karben	1–1	Eintracht Frankfurt	Karben, Germany
	Džihić 24'	(Report)	Rosen 31'	Stadium: Günther-Reutzel-Sportfeld; Attendance: 2,500; Referee: Grieben

7 August 1998	KFC Lommelse SK	1–3	Eintracht Frankfurt	Sailauf, Germany
	Bembuana-Keve 28'	(Report)	Yang 58', 70'; Maes 73' (o.g.)	Attendance: 500; Referee: Wolf

2 September 1998	TSV Pfungstadt	0–13	Eintracht Frankfurt	Pfungstadt, Germany
		(Report)	Gerster 6', 48'; Güntensperger 10'; Stojak 20', 31'; Gebhardt 29'; Westerthaler 43', 51', 67'; Flick 64', 89'; U Schneider 75'; Agu 81'	Attendance: 700; Referee: Imhof

7 October 1998	Karlsruher SC	7–4	Eintracht Frankfurt	Leimen, Germany
	Stumpf 25' (pen.); Schwarz 27'; Fährmann 36'; Gilewicz	(Report)	Flick 1', 88'; Westerthaler 43', 90'	Attendance: 700

20 October 1998	Eintracht Frankfurt	3–0	Eintracht Frankfurt Amateure / Eintracht Frankfurt Academy	Frankfurt, Germany
	Sobotzik pen' Histilloles	(Report)		Stadium: Ancillary pitch at the Waldstadion; Attendance: 50; Referee: Kraaz
Note: Each half time was 35 minutes

23 January 1999	Borussia Fulda	1–3	Eintracht Frankfurt	Fulda, Germany
14:30 CEST	Fladung 65'	(Report)	Westerthaler 16', 59'; Janßen 90'	Stadium: Sportpark Johannisau; Attendance: 4,000

24 January 1999	Waldhof Mannheim	2–2	Eintracht Frankfurt
19:00 CEST	Vukčević 58'; Birlik 90'	(Report)	Fjørtoft 4'; Zinnow 50'	Attendance: 3,000

27 January 1999	Viktoria Aschaffenburg	1–1	Eintracht Frankfurt	Aschaffenburg, Germany
	Tobollik 30'	(Report)	Nwosu 4'	Stadium: Stadion am Schönbusch; Attendance: 500

3 February 1999	Étoile du Sahel	0–1	Eintracht Frankfurt	Sousse, Tunisia
		(Report)	Fjørtoft 32'	Stadium: Stade Olympique de Sousse; Attendance: 4,000

6 February 1999	CS Sfaxien	1–1	Eintracht Frankfurt	Sfax, Tunisia
	Zaki 13'	(Report)	Sobotzik 53'	Stadium: Stade Taïeb Mhiri; Attendance: 1,500

8 February 1999	FSV Frankfurt	0–4	Eintracht Frankfurt	Sousse, Tunisia
		(Report)	Fjørtoft 15', 36'; Brinkmann 22'; Westerthaler 29'	Stadium: Training pitch of Étoile du Sahel

13 February 1999	Eintracht Frankfurt	1–2	Bohemians Praha	Frankfurt, Germany
	Sobotzik 62'	(Report)	Zdráhal 16'; Slezák 76'	Stadium: Ancillary pitch at the Waldstadion; Attendance: 250

3 March 1999	Eintracht Frankfurt	4–2	1. FC Saarbrücken	Frankfurt, Germany
	Yang 27', 28'; Nwosu 58'; Stojak 69'	(Report)	Petry (guest player); Caillas 84'	Stadium: Ancillary pitch at the Waldstadion

25 March 1999	Racing Strasbourg	3–1	Eintracht Frankfurt
19:00 CEST	Echouafni 32'; Ehret 75'; Hemdani 90'	(Report)	B Schneider 56'	Attendance: 1,500

31 March 1999	SG Croatia Frankfurt	0–2	Eintracht Frankfurt	Frankfurt, Germany
		(Report)	Amstätter 35'; Gebhardt 54'	Stadium: Sportplatz des Polizeisportvereins; Attendance: 300

=== Indoor soccer tournaments ===
==== Münster ====
15 January 1999 First match	Arminia Bielefeld	1–4	Eintracht Frankfurt	Münster, Germany
	Ronald Maul	(Report)	Schur; Rosen; B Schneider; Amstätter

15 January 1999 Second match	Preußen Münster	3–1	Eintracht Frankfurt	Münster, Germany
	Becker; Buschkötter; Ridder	(Report)	B Schneider

15 January 1999 Semi-Final	Münster XI	1–3	Eintracht Frankfurt	Münster, Germany
	Goal	(Report)	Amstätter; B Schneider

15 January 1999 Final	Arminia Bielefeld	2–3	Eintracht Frankfurt	Münster, Germany
	Goal	(Report)	Mutzel; B Schneider; Amstätter

==== Frankfurt ====
20 January 1999 First match	Eintracht Frankfurt	2–0	Fortuna Düsseldorf	Frankfurt, Germany
	Gebhardt; Pisont	(Report)		Stadium: Festhalle; Attendance: 5,800

20 January 1999 Second match	Eintracht Frankfurt	2–2	FSV Mainz 05	Frankfurt, Germany
	Amstätter da Silva	(Report)	Demandt; Klopp	Stadium: Festhalle; Attendance: 5,800

20 January 1999 Third match	Eintracht Frankfurt	4–2	FC St. Pauli	Frankfurt, Germany
	Nwosu; B Schneider da Silva	(Report)	Scherz; Lotter	Stadium: Festhalle; Attendance: 5,800

21 January 1999 Semi-Final	Eintracht Frankfurt	1–3	Kickers Offenbach	Frankfurt, Germany
	Pisont	(Report)	Kolinger; Dama; Dolzer	Stadium: Festhalle; Attendance: 7,000

21 January 1999 3rd place playoff	Eintracht Frankfurt	4–2	FC St. Pauli	Frankfurt, Germany
	Pisont da Silva; Amstätter	(Report)	Seeliger; Klasnić	Stadium: Festhalle; Attendance: 7,000

==== Dortmund ====
30 January 1999 First match	Kickers Offenbach	1–2	Eintracht Frankfurt	Dortmund, Germany
	Simon pen.'	(Report)	Bounoua; Pisont

30 January 1999 Second match	Borussia Dortmund	1–4	Eintracht Frankfurt	Dortmund, Germany
	But	(Report)	Amstätter; Bounoua; Gebhardt; Mutzel

31 January 1999 Quarter-Final	Bayern Munich	1–2	Eintracht Frankfurt	Dortmund, Germany
	Salihamidžić	(Report)	Pisont; Brinkmann

31 January 1999 Semi-Final	VfL Wolfsburg	1–0	Eintracht Frankfurt	Dortmund, Germany
	Kapetanović	(Report)

31 January 1999 3rd place playoff	Rot-Weiß Oberhausen	0–2	Eintracht Frankfurt	Dortmund, Germany
		(Report)	Bounoua; Gebhardt

=== Competitions ===
Win Draw Loss

==== Bundesliga ====
===== League table =====
Pos	Team	Pld	W	D	L	GF	GA	GD	Pts	Qualification or relegation
13	Werder Bremen	34	10	8	16	41	47	−6	38	Qualification to UEFA Cup first round (Note: Werder Bremen won the DFB-Pokal (domestic cup) and thus qualified for the UEFA Cup.)
14	Hansa Rostock	34	9	11	14	49	58	−9	38	
15	Eintracht Frankfurt	34	9	10	15	44	54	−10	37	
16	1. FC Nürnberg (R)	34	7	16	11	40	50	−10	37	Relegation to 2. Bundesliga
17	VfL Bochum (R)	34	7	8	19	40	65	−25	29	Relegation to 2. Bundesliga

Source: www.dfb.de
Rules for classification: 1) points; 2) goal difference; 3) number of goals scored.
(R) Relegated

===== Results summary =====
Overall								Home						Away					
Pld	W	D	L	GF	GA	GD	Pts	W	D	L	GF	GA	GD	W	D	L	GF	GA	GD
34	9	10	15	44	54	−10	37	6	6	5	26	21	+5	3	4	10	18	33	−15

Source: Competitive matches

===== Results by round =====
Round	1	2	3	4	5	6	7	8	9	10	11	12	13	14	15	16	17	18	19	20	21	22	23	24	25	26	27	28	29	30	31	32	33	34
Ground	A	H	A	H	A	H	A	H	A	H	A	H	A	H	A	H	A	H	A	H	A	H	A	H	A	H	A	H	A	H	A	H	A	H
Result	L	L	D	D	L	W	D	L	L	W	D	W	W	L	L	L	L	D	L	D	L	D	D	W	L	L	L	D	L	D	W	W	W	W
Position	13	16	16	17	18	15	15	15	16	15	15	12	11	11	13	15	15	15	16	15	16	15	15	15	16	16	17	17	17	17	17	16	16	15

Source: kicker.de
A = Away; H = Home; W = Win; D = Draw; L = Loss

===== Matches =====
14 August 1998 1	MSV Duisburg	2–1	Eintracht Frankfurt	Duisburg, Germany
19:30 CEST	Spies 18'; Hoersen 48'	(Report)	Sobotzik 26'	Stadium: Wedaustadion; Attendance: 21,000; Referee: Fandel

22 August 1998 2	Eintracht Frankfurt	2–3	TSV 1860 Munich	Frankfurt, Germany
15:30 CEST	Schur 10'; Weber 54'	(Report)	Borimirov 35'; Ouakili 61'; Winkler 76' (pen.)	Stadium: Waldstadion; Attendance: 37,500; Referee: Strampe

8 September 1998 3	Borussia Mönchengladbach	1–1	Eintracht Frankfurt	Mönchengladbach, Germany
20:00 CEST	Pettersson 89'	(Report)	Yang 69'	Stadium: Bökelbergstadion; Attendance: 31,500; Referee: Kemmling

11 September 1998 4	Eintracht Frankfurt	1–1	VfB Stuttgart	Frankfurt, Germany
20:00 CEST	Bindewald (yellow card) 74' (yellow-red card); Brinkmann 89' (pen.)	(Report)	Balakov 72'	Stadium: Waldstadion; Attendance: 31,500; Referee: Aust

18 September 1998 5	Hertha BSC	3–1	Eintracht Frankfurt	Berlin, Germany
20:00 CEST	Preetz 27', 55'; Tchami 81'	(Report)	Yang 14'	Stadium: Olympiastadion; Attendance: 45,000; Referee: Zerr

27 September 1998 6	Eintracht Frankfurt	3–2	1. FC Nürnberg	Frankfurt, Germany
18:00 CEST	Weber 20', 87'; Westerthaler 77'	(Report)	Polunin 30'; Ćirić 86'	Stadium: Waldstadion; Attendance: 24,000; Referee: Fröhlich

3 October 1998 7	VfL Bochum	0–0	Eintracht Frankfurt	Bochum, Germany
15:30 CEST		(Report)		Stadium: Ruhrstadion; Attendance: 26,500; Referee: Dardenne

17 October 1998 8	Eintracht Frankfurt	2–3	Bayer Leverkusen	Frankfurt, Germany
15:30 CEST	Yang 23'; Schur 28'	(Report)	Kirsten 54'; Kovač 75'; Reichenberger 85'	Stadium: Waldstadion; Attendance: 30,000; Referee: Stark

24 October 1998 9	VfL Wolfsburg	2–0	Eintracht Frankfurt	Wolfsburg, Germany
15:30 CEST	Ballwanz 11'; Juskowiak 90'	(Report)		Stadium: VfL-Stadion; Attendance: 14,000; Referee: Merk

31 October 1998 10	Eintracht Frankfurt	1–0	Bayern Munich	Frankfurt, Germany
15:30 CEST	Sobotzik 32'	(Report)	Jancker (yellow card) 61' (yellow-red card)	Stadium: Waldstadion; Attendance: 58,500; Referee: Weber

7 November 1998 11	Hansa Rostock	2–2	Eintracht Frankfurt	Rostock, Germany
15:30 CEST	Ehlers 44'; Pamić (red card) 67'; Lange 86'	(Report)	Pedersen 26'; B Schneider 87'	Stadium: Ostseestadion; Attendance: 11,000; Referee: Jansen

11 November 1998 12	Eintracht Frankfurt	3–1	SC Freiburg	Frankfurt, Germany
20:00 CEST	B Schneider 12'; Epp 37'; Gebhardt 90'	(Report)	Wassmer 23'; Weißhaupt (red card) 80'	Stadium: Waldstadion; Attendance: 20,000; Referee: Gettke

14 November 1998 13	Hamburger SV	0–1	Eintracht Frankfurt	Hamburg, Germany
15:30 CEST		(Report)	Sobotzik 33'	Stadium: Volksparkstadion; Attendance: 23,500; Referee: Zerr

20 November 1998 14	Eintracht Frankfurt	0–2	Werder Bremen	Frankfurt, Germany
20:00 CEST		(Report)	Herzog 47'; Bogdanović 72'	Stadium: Waldstadion; Attendance: 27,500; Referee: Steinborn

27 November 1998 15	Borussia Dortmund	3–1	Eintracht Frankfurt	Dortmund, Germany
20:00 CEST	Chapuisat 13'; Salou 63'; Möller 75'	(Report)	Weber 54'	Stadium: Westfalenstadion; Attendance: 63,500; Referee: Berg

5 December 1998 16	Eintracht Frankfurt	1–2	FC Schalke 04	Frankfurt, Germany
15:30 CEST	Fjørtoft 80'	(Report)	van Hoogdalem 21'; Kmetsch 38'	Stadium: Waldstadion; Attendance: 33,000; Referee: Dardenne

12 December 1998 17	1. FC Kaiserslautern	2–1	Eintracht Frankfurt	Kaiserslautern, Germany
15:30 CEST	Ballack 4'; Ramzy 90'	(Report)	Stojak 73'	Stadium: Fritz-Walter-Stadion; Attendance: 41,500; Referee: Buchhart

19 December 1998 18	Eintracht Frankfurt	0–0	MSV Duisburg	Frankfurt, Germany
15:30 CEST	Hubchev (red card) 73'; Pedersen (yellow card) 84' (yellow-red card)	(Report)		Stadium: Waldstadion; Attendance: 17,000; Referee: Albrecht

20 February 1999 19	TSV 1860 Munich	4–1	Eintracht Frankfurt	Munich, Germany
15:30 CEST	Borimirov 5'; Heldt 15'; Kurz 28'; Hobsch 45'	(Report)	Westerthaler 69'	Stadium: Olympiastadion; Attendance: 21,000; Referee: Krug

27 February 1999 20	Eintracht Frankfurt	0–0	Borussia Mönchengladbach	Frankfurt, Germany
15:30 CEST		(Report)		Stadium: Waldstadion; Attendance: 38,000; Referee: Fröhlich

6 March 1999 21	VfB Stuttgart	2–0	Eintracht Frankfurt	Stuttgart, Germany
15:30 CEST	Balakov 41'; Carnell 90'	(Report)		Stadium: Gottlieb-Daimler-Stadion; Attendance: 23,500; Referee: Fleischer

14 March 1999 22	Eintracht Frankfurt	1–1	Hertha BSC	Frankfurt, Germany
18:00 CEST	Yang 73'	(Report)	Sverrisson 59'	Stadium: Waldstadion; Attendance: 26,000; Referee: Aust

20 March 1999 23	1. FC Nürnberg	2–2	Eintracht Frankfurt	Nuremberg, Germany
15:30 CEST	Yang 9', 62'	(Report)	Kuka 20'; Ćirić 79'	Stadium: Frankenstadion; Attendance: 34,500; Referee: Krug

4 April 1999 24	Eintracht Frankfurt	1–0	VfL Bochum	Frankfurt, Germany
18:00 CEST	Fjørtoft 86'	(Report)	Michalke (yellow card) 82' (yellow-red card)	Stadium: Waldstadion; Attendance: 32,000; Referee: Koop

10 April 1999 25	Bayer Leverkusen	2–1	Eintracht Frankfurt	Leverkusen, Germany
15:30 CEST	Kirsten 25', 29'	(Report)	Zampach 63'	Stadium: Ulrich-Haberland-Stadion; Attendance: 22,500; Referee: Wack

13 April 1999 26	Eintracht Frankfurt	0–1	VfL Wolfsburg	Frankfurt, Germany
20:00 CEST		(Report)	Schur 5' (o.g.)	Stadium: Waldstadion; Attendance: 17,500; Referee: Stark

16 April 1999 27	Bayern Munich	3–1	Eintracht Frankfurt	Munich, Germany
20:00 CEST	Bindewald 27' (o.g.); Zickler 34'; Strunz 72'	(Report)	Fjørtoft 80'	Stadium: Olympiastadion; Attendance: 46,000; Referee: Jansen

24 April 1999 28	Eintracht Frankfurt	2–2	Hansa Rostock	Frankfurt, Germany
15:30 CEST	B Schneider 55'; Westerthaler 90'	(Report)	Wibrån 42'; Agali 69'	Stadium: Waldstadion; Attendance: 33,000; Referee: Heynemann

30 April 1999 29	SC Freiburg	2–0	Eintracht Frankfurt	Freiburg
20:00 CEST	Ben Slimane 29'; Kobiashvili 49'	(Report)		Stadium: Dreisamstadion; Attendance: 22,500; Referee: Merk

4 May 1999 30	Eintracht Frankfurt	2–2	Hamburger SV	Frankfurt, Germany
20:00 CEST	Schur 24'; Yang 42'	(Report)	Yeboah 73'; Hoogma 90'	Stadium: Waldstadion; Attendance: 23,500; Referee: Albrecht

7 May 1999 31	Werder Bremen	1–2	Eintracht Frankfurt	Bremen, Germany
20:00 CEST	Bode 72'	(Report)	Schur 55'; Sobotzik 70'	Stadium: Weserstadion; Attendance: 31,500; Referee: Fleischer

15 May 1999 32	Eintracht Frankfurt	2–0	Borussia Dortmund	Frankfurt, Germany
15:30 CEST	Fjørtoft 40'; Sobotzik 49'	(Report)		Stadium: Waldstadion; Attendance: 50,000; Referee: Strampe

22 May 1999 33	FC Schalke 04	2–3	Eintracht Frankfurt	Gelsenkirchen, Germany
15:30 CEST	Held 5'; Mandıralı 14'	(Report)	Fjørtoft 24'; Sobotzik 54' (pen.); Janßen 75'	Stadium: Parkstadion; Attendance: 51,500; Referee: Merk

29 May 1999 34	Eintracht Frankfurt	5–1	1. FC Kaiserslautern	Frankfurt, Germany
15:30 CEST	Yang 47'; Sobotzik 70'; Gebhardt 80'; B Schneider 82'; Fjørtoft 89'	(Report)	Schjønberg 68' (pen.)	Stadium: Waldstadion; Attendance: 58,000; Referee: Jansen

==== DFB-Pokal ====
30 August 1998 First round	Rot-Weiß Erfurt	1–6	Eintracht Frankfurt	Erfurt, Germany
15:00 CEST	Scheller 89'	(Report)	Sobotzik 44'; Pisont 61'; Yang 72'; Gebhardt 79'; Westerthaler 82', 85'	Stadium: Steigerwaldstadion; Attendance: 11,000; Referee: Fröhlich

22 September 1998 Second round	VfB Stuttgart	3–2	Eintracht Frankfurt	Stuttgart, Germany
19:30 CEST	Đorđević 17'; Lisztes 45'; Spanring 90'	(Report)	B Schneider 47', 50'	Stadium: Gottlieb-Daimler-Stadion; Attendance: 10,000; Referee: Krug

== Players ==
=== First-team squad ===
Squad at end of season

Note: Flags indicate national team as defined under FIFA eligibility rules; some limited exceptions apply. Players may hold more than one non-FIFA nationality.

No.	Pos.	Nation	Player
1	GK	MKD	Oka Nikolov (Note: Nikolov was born in Erbach im Odenwald, West Germany (now Germany), but also qualified to represent Macedonia (now North Macedonia) internationally and made his international debut for Macedonia in September 1998.)
2	MF	GER	Sascha Amstätter
3	DF	NGA	Donald Agu
4	DF	NOR	Tore Pedersen
5	DF	BUL	Petar Hubchev
6	DF	GER	Thomas Zampach
7	FW	GER	Thomas Epp
8	MF	GER	Ralf Weber
9	FW	NOR	Jan Åge Fjørtoft
10	MF	POL	Thomas Sobotzik
11	MF	GER	Marco Gebhardt
12	GK	HUN	Zsolt Petry
14	DF	GER	Uwe Schneider
15	MF	GER	Bernd Schneider
16	MF	GER	Olaf Janßen
17	MF	HUN	István Pisont

No.	Pos.	Nation	Player
18	DF	GER	Alexander Kutschera
19	MF	BRA	Antônio da Silva
20	DF	GER	Uwe Bindewald
21	FW	CHN	Yang Chen
22	DF	TUR	Burhanettin Kaymak
23	GK	GER	Sven Schmitt
24	MF	GER	Alexander Schur
26	FW	YUG	Damir Stojak (on loan from Napoli)
29	MF	GER	Frank Gerster
30	MF	AUT	Christoph Westerthaler
31	FW	NGA	Henry Nwosu
32	MF	GER	Ansgar Brinkmann
33	MF	GER	Alexander Lorenz
35	MF	MAR	Mourad Bounoua (Note: Bounoua was born in Mulhouse, France, but also qualified to represent Morocco internationally and made his international debut for Morocco in 1998.)
—	MF	GER	Stefan Zinnow

=== Left club during season ===
Note: Flags indicate national team as defined under FIFA eligibility rules; some limited exceptions apply. Players may hold more than one non-FIFA nationality.

No. / Pos. / Nation / Player; 4 / MF / GER / Thorsten Flick (on loan to Napoli)	No. / Pos. / Nation / Player; 9 / FW / SUI / Urs Güntensperger (to Lausanne-Sport)

=== Eintracht Frankfurt II ===
Note: Flags indicate national team as defined under FIFA eligibility rules; some limited exceptions apply. Players may hold more than one non-FIFA nationality.

No. / Pos. / Nation / Player; — / DF / CMR / Jean-Paul Ndeki	No. / Pos. / Nation / Player; — / MF / GER / Michael Mutzel

=== Under-19s ===
Note: Flags indicate national team as defined under FIFA eligibility rules; some limited exceptions apply. Players may hold more than one non-FIFA nationality.

No. / Pos. / Nation / Player; — / MF / GER / Jermaine Jones (Note: Jones was born in Frankfurt, West Germany (now Germany), and represented Germany at U-20, U-21 and B level before making his international debut for Germany in 2008, but also qualified to represent the United States internationally through his father and made his international debut for the United States in October 2010.)	No. / Pos. / Nation / Player; — / MF / GER / Albert Streit (Note: Streit was born in Bucharest, Romania, but was raised in Germany and represented Germany at U-16, U-17, U-18 and B level.)

=== Under-17s ===
Note: Flags indicate national team as defined under FIFA eligibility rules; some limited exceptions apply. Players may hold more than one non-FIFA nationality.

No.	Pos.	Nation	Player
—	GK	GER	Daniel Haas

== Statistics ==
=== Appearances and goals ===
No.	Pos	Nat	Player	Total		Bundesliga		DFB-Pokal	
No.	Pos	Nat	Player	Apps	Goals	Apps	Goals	Apps	Goals
1	GK	(North Macedonia) MKD	Oka Nikolov	36	0	34	0	2	0
2	MF	(Germany) GER	Sascha Amstätter	2	0	2	0	0	0
4	MF	(Germany) GER	~~Thorsten Flick~~	1	0	1	0	0	0
4	DF	(Norway) NOR	Tore Pedersen	20	1	20	1	0	0
5	DF	(Bulgaria) BUL	Petar Hubchev	28	0	27	0	1	0
6	MF	(Germany) GER	Thomas Zampach	22	1	20	1	2	0
7	FW	(Germany) GER	Thomas Epp	10	1	9	1	1	0
8	DF	(Germany) GER	Ralf Weber	22	4	20	4	2	0
9	FW	(Switzerland) SUI	~~Urs Güntensperger~~	0	0	0	0	0	0
9	FW	(Norway) NOR	Jan Åge Fjørtoft	17	6	17	6	0	0
10	MF	(Germany) GER	Thomas Sobotzik	31	8	30	7	1	1
11	MF	(Germany) GER	Marco Gebhardt	19	3	17	2	2	1
12	GK	(Hungary) HUN	Zsolt Petry	0	0	0	0	0	0
14	DF	(Germany) GER	Uwe Schneider	9	0	9	0	0	0
15	MF	(Germany) GER	Bernd Schneider	35	6	33	4	2	2
16	MF	(Germany) GER	Olaf Janßen	16	1	16	1	0	0
17	DF	(Hungary) HUN	István Pisont	19	1	17	0	2	1
18	DF	(Germany) GER	Alexander Kutschera	31	0	29	0	2	0
20	DF	(Germany) GER	Uwe Bindewald	34	0	32	0	2	0
21	FW	(China) CHN	Yang Chen	25	9	23	8	2	1
22	DF	(Turkey) TUR	Burhanettin Kaymak	9	0	8	0	1	0
23	GK	(Germany) GER	Sven Schmitt	0	0	0	0	0	0
24	MF	(Germany) GER	Alexander Schur	32	4	30	4	2	0
25	MF	(Germany) GER	Alexander Rosen	1	0	1	0	0	0
26	FW	(Federal Republic of Yugoslavia) YUG	Damir Stojak	9	1	9	1	0	0
29	MF	(Germany) GER	Frank Gerster	1	0	1	0	0	0
30	FW	(Austria) AUT	Christoph Westerthaler	29	5	27	3	2	2
31	MF	(Nigeria) NGA	Henry Nwosu	4	0	4	0	0	0
32	MF	(Germany) GER	Ansgar Brinkmann	31	1	29	1	2	0
35	MF	(Morocco) MAR	Mourad Bounoua	7	0	7	0	0	0
36	MF	(Germany) GER	Stefan Zinnow	1	0	1	0	0	0

=== Transfers ===
==== Summer ====
In:

No.	Pos.	Nation	Player
3	DF	NGA	Donald Agu (from FC Augsburg)
4	DF	NOR	Tore Pedersen (from Blackburn Rovers)
9	FW	NOR	Jan Åge Fjørtoft (from Barnsley)
12	GK	HUN	Zsolt Petry (from Feyenoord)
14	MF	GER	Uwe Schneider (from 1. FC Nürnberg)
15	MF	GER	Bernd Schneider (from FC Carl Zeiss Jena)
17	MF	HUN	István Pisont (from Beitar Jerusalem)
21	MF	CHN	Yang Chen (loaned from Beijing Guoan)
22	DF	TUR	Burhanettin Kaymak (from Eintracht Frankfurt II)
25	MF	GER	Alexander Rosen (from FC Augsburg)
26	MF	YUG	Damir Stojak (loaned from SSC Napoli)
28	MF	GER	Patrick Glöckner (was loaned to Stuttgarter Kickers)
29	MF	GER	Frank Gerster (from Bayern Munich II)
33	MF	GER	Michael Mutzel (from FC Augsburg)

Out:

No.	Pos.	Nation	Player
3	MF	GER	Dirk Wolf (to FC St. Pauli)
4	MF	GER	Thorsten Flick (loaned to SSC Napoli)
13	MF	BIH	Sead Mehić (loaned to SV Meppen)
17	FW	GER	Oliver Bunzenthal (loaned to SV Wehen)
21	MF	GER	Renato Levy (loaned to FSV Frankfurt)
33	MF	LBR	Jonathan Sawieh (loaned to Waldhof Mannheim)

==== Winter ====
In:

No.	Pos.	Nation	Player
35	MF	MAR	Mourad Bounoua (from Stuttgarter Kickers)

Out:

No.	Pos.	Nation	Player

== Sources ==
- Matheja, Ulrich (2011). Unsere Eintracht – Eintracht Frankfurt – Die Chronik. Die Werkstatt. ISBN 978-3-89533-750-5.
