= 1999–2000 Eintracht Frankfurt season =

Eintracht Frankfurt
1999-2000 season
- Chairman: Rolf Heller
- Manager: Jörg Berger (resigned 19 December 1999); Felix Magath (appointed 27 December 1999)
- Bundesliga: 14th
- DFB-Pokal: Third round
- Top goalscorer: League: Bachirou Salou (8); All: Bachirou Salou (8)
- Highest home attendance: 59,500 (vs Bayern Munich, 18 September)
- Lowest home attendance: 18,500 (vs SC Freiburg, 9 February)
- Average home league attendance: 35,882
Home colours	Away colours

The 1999–2000 Eintracht Frankfurt season was the 100th season in the club's football history. In 1999–2000 the club played in the Bundesliga, the top tier of German football. It was the club's 98th season in the first tier.

== Results ==
=== Friendlies ===
Win Draw Loss

6 July 1999	SpVgg 1910 Langenselbold	0–12	Eintracht Frankfurt	Frankfurt, Germany
		(Report)	Salou; Hubchev; Schur; Falk; Janßen; Weber; Rosen; Zinnow	Stadium: Riederwaldstadion; Attendance: 2,000

10 July 1999	SG Hoechst / VfB Unterliederbach XI	0–4	Eintracht Frankfurt	Frankfurt, Germany
	Guié-Mien 10'; Heldt 59'; Fjørtoft 78'; Salou 85'	(Report)		Stadium: Stadion am Stadtpark; Attendance: 3,000

11 July 1999 First match	Eintracht Frankfurt	5–0	SpVgg Neu-Isenburg	Frankfurt, Germany
	Fjørtoft; Rosen; Gebhardt	(Report)		Stadium: Stadion am Bornheimer Hang; Attendance: 6,000
Note: FSV Frankfurt centenary tournament 20 minutes per half time

11 July 1999 Second match	Eintracht Frankfurt	1–1	FK Teplice	Frankfurt, Germany
	Salou	(Report)	Goal	Stadium: Stadion am Bornheimer Hang; Attendance: 6,000
Note: FSV Frankfurt centenary tournament 20 minutes per half time

11 July 1999 Semi-Final	Eintracht Frankfurt	2–1	Borussia Mönchengladbach	Frankfurt, Germany
	Weber	(Report)	Goal	Stadium: Stadion am Bornheimer Hang; Attendance: 6,000
Note: FSV Frankfurt centenary tournament 20 minutes per half time

11 July 1999 Final	Eintracht Frankfurt	0–0 (4–3 p)	FC Gütersloh	Frankfurt, Germany
		(Report)		Stadium: Stadion am Bornheimer Hang; Attendance: 6,000
	Penalties
	Fjørtoft, Falk, Heldt, Weber
Note: FSV Frankfurt centenary tournament 20 minutes per half time

13 July 1999	SVA Bad Hersfeld	0–4	Eintracht Frankfurt	Bad Hersfeld, Germany
19:00 CEST		(Report)	Yang 13', 39'; Westerthaler 59'; Hubchev 63'	Attendance: 3,000

14 July 1999	VfB Marburg	0–1	Eintracht Frankfurt	Germany
		(Report)	Fjørtoft 67'	Attendance: 3,000

19 July 1999	Eintracht Frankfurt	1–1	Sparta Prague	Oberammergau, Germany
	Weber 40' (pen.)	(Report)	Siegl 25'	Attendance: 300

21 July 1999	SC Imst	0–12	Eintracht Frankfurt	Austria
		(Report)	Salou; Weber; Falk; Westerthaler; Kracht; Guié-Mien	Attendance: 500

25 July 1999	TSV Bergen	0–10	Eintracht Frankfurt	Bergen, Germany
		(Report)	Westerthaler; Weber; Kracht; Bulut	Attendance: 2,500

28 July 1999	Königstein XI	0–10	Eintracht Frankfurt	Königstein, Germany
19:00 CEST		(Report)	Fjørtoft; Yang; Hubchev; Westerthaler	Stadium: Sportanlage Altkönigblick; Attendance: 3,500

30 July 1999	Hannover 96	1–4	Eintracht Frankfurt	Peine, Germany
	Blank	(Report)	Weber 9' (pen.); Salou 38', 49'; Fjørtoft 50'	Attendance: 2,000

5 August 1999	Eintracht Frankfurt	2–1	Bayern Munich	Frankfurt, Germany
	Guié-Mien 39'; Westerthaler 85'	(Report)	Zickler 31'	Stadium: Waldstadion; Attendance: 22,000; Referee: Zerr

24 August 1999	FSV Frankfurt	0–3	Eintracht Frankfurt	Frankfurt, Germany
		(Report)	Westerthaler; Schur	Stadium: Stadion am Bornheimer Hang; Attendance: 300
Note: 35 minutes per half time

2 September 1999	FSV Mernes	2–11	Eintracht Frankfurt	Bad Soden-Salmünster, Germany
18:00 CEST	Stein 17'; Kreis 75'	(Report)	Bulut 13'; Yang 28' 77' 85' 88'; Westerthaler 33', 48'; Falk 64', 82'; Hubchev 66' (pen.)	Stadium: Sportanlage Mernes; Attendance: 2,100

7 September 1999	KSV Baunatal	0–8	Eintracht Frankfurt	Germany
		(Report)	Falk; Salou; Yang; Kutschera; Fjørtoft; Heldt	Attendance: 2,000

8 October 1999	FC Cleeberg	0–10	Eintracht Frankfurt	Langgöns, Germany
		(Report)	Streit 7', 37'; Westerthaler 12'; Bulut 17', 30', 34'; Yang 26', 35', 59'; Anyanwu 64' (pen.)	Attendance: 1,000

10 November 1999	SV Adler Weidenhausen	2–4	Eintracht Frankfurt	Germany
	14'; Kruse 49'	(Report)	Westerthaler 19', 40'; Heldt 35' (pen.), 42' (pen.)	Attendance: 1,200

13 November 1999	VfR Kesselstadt	1–9	Eintracht Frankfurt	Hanau, Germany
	Yıldız 75'	(Report)	Kracht 28'; Yang 34', 37', 46', 61'; Guié-Mien 45', 58'; Westerthaler 76'; Falk 80'	Stadium: Herbert-Dröse-Stadion; Attendance: 600

15 January 2000	Eintracht Frankfurt	3–1	Alemannia Aachen	Frankfurt, Germany
	Yang 77'; Sobotzik 82'; Heldt 84' (pen.)	(Report)	Luciano 75'	Stadium: Riederwaldstadion; Attendance: 2,000

16 January 2000	Mainz 05	2–0	Eintracht Frankfurt	Hochheim, Germany
	Škrinjar 47'; Jakić 67'	(Report)		Attendance: 3,000

20 January 2000	Dinamo Minsk	2–0	Eintracht Frankfurt	Pyla, Cyprus
	Valadzyankow 17'; Vetelki 77'	(Report)

23 January 2000	Metalurh Donetsk	1–2	Eintracht Frankfurt	Limassol, Cyprus
	Shyshchenko 78'	(Report)	Yaksmanitsky 18' (o.g.); Bindewald 71'

26 January 2000	SV Bernbach	1–1	Eintracht Frankfurt	Germany
	Goal	(Report)	Sobotzik 22' (pen.)

28 January 2000	Eintracht Frankfurt	1–0	Eintracht Frankfurt Amateurs	Frankfurt, Germany
	Yang	(Report)		Stadium: Riederwaldstadion; Attendance: 100

30 January 2000	Stuttgarter Kickers	2–1	Eintracht Frankfurt	Brackenheim, Germany
	Marić 19'; Chatzis 80'	(Report)	Schur 31'	Attendance: 400

23 February 2000	Eintracht Frankfurt	1–5	FSV Frankfurt	Frankfurt, Germany
	Guié-Mien	(Report)	Christoph Westerthaler; Bury; Opoku	Stadium: Ancillary pitch at the Waldstadion; Attendance: 300

22 May 2000	FV Bad Vilbel	1–4	Eintracht Frankfurt	Bad Vilbel, Germany
	Trupp 28'	(Report)	Rasiejewski 22'; Ralf Schmitt 23'; Yang 50'; Reichenberger 57'	Stadium: Niddasportfeld; Attendance: 1,700; Referee: Grieben

23 May 2000	TSV Großen-Linden	4–10	Eintracht Frankfurt	Germany
	Cannon 61'; Hassler 63', 80'; Rennert 71'	(Report)	Fjørtoft 9' (pen.), 33', 73'; Schur 17', 21'; Reichenberger 41', 66', 89'; Nikolov 70'; Kutschera 85'	Attendance: 1,400

24 May 2000	SV Wiesbaden	1–7	Eintracht Frankfurt	Wiesbaden, Germany
	Goal	(Report)	Reichenberger; Guié-Mien; Kracht; Sobotzik pen.' Deißenberger (guest player)	Stadium: Stadion an der Berliner Straße; Attendance: 2,500

25 May 2000	SKG Stockstadt	4–13	Eintracht Frankfurt	Germany
	Langenfelder; Raffa	(Report)	Reichenberger; Sobotzik; Salou; Fjørtoft; Kracht; Kutschera	Attendance: 1,500

26 May 2000	DJK Italia Hattersheim	2–7	Eintracht Frankfurt	Germany
	Boakye 70', 79'	(Report)	Salou 11'; Reichenberger 20', 35', 55', 90'; Nikolov 58' (pen.); Yang 76'	Attendance: 1,500

=== Indoor soccer tournaments ===
==== Stuttgart ====
9 January 2000 First match	Stuttgarter Kickers	1–0	Eintracht Frankfurt	Stuttgart, Germany
	Kevrić	(Report)		Stadium: Hanns-Martin-Schleyer-Halle

9 January 2000 Second match	Waldhof Mannheim	3–3	Eintracht Frankfurt	Stuttgart, Germany
	Goal	(Report)	Schur; Gebhardt; U Schneider	Stadium: Hanns-Martin-Schleyer-Halle

9 January 2000 Third match	1. FC Kaiserslautern	2–4	Eintracht Frankfurt	Stuttgart, Germany
	Goal	(Report)	Goal	Stadium: Hanns-Martin-Schleyer-Halle

==== Erfurt ====
12 January 2000 First match	Eintracht Frankfurt	0–1	Legia Warsaw	Erfurt, Germany
		(Report)	Goal	Stadium: Messe Erfurt; Attendance: 5,800

12 January 2000 Second match	Sachsen Leipzig	2–1	Eintracht Frankfurt	Erfurt, Germany
	Goal	(Report)	Schur	Stadium: Messe Erfurt; Attendance: 5,800

12 January 2000 Third match	FC Carl Zeiss Jena	1–2	Eintracht Frankfurt	Erfurt, Germany
	Goal	(Report)	Mutzel; Gebhardt	Stadium: Messe Erfurt; Attendance: 5,800

13 January 2000 3rd place playoff	Rot-Weiss Erfurt	2–4	Eintracht Frankfurt	Erfurt, Germany
	Goal	(Report)	Gebhardt; Heldt; Rasiejewski	Stadium: Messe Erfurt; Attendance: 5,800

=== Competitions ===
Win Draw Loss

==== Bundesliga ====
===== League table =====
Pos	Team	Pld	W	D	L	GF	GA	GD	Pts	Qualification or relegation
12	SC Freiburg	34	10	10	14	45	50	−5	40	
13	Schalke 04	34	8	15	11	42	44	−2	39 (Note: Head-to-head was used as a tie-breaker between Schalke 04 and Frankfurt.)	
14	Eintracht Frankfurt (Note: Eintracht Frankfurt were docked two points because of licensing irregularities.)	34	12	5	17	42	44	−2	39	
15	Hansa Rostock	34	8	14	12	44	60	−16	38	
16	SSV Ulm 1846 (R)	34	9	8	17	36	62	−26	35	Relegation to 2. Bundesliga

Source: www.dfb.de
Rules for classification: 1) points; 2) goal difference; 3) number of goals scored.
(R) Relegated

===== Results summary =====
Overall								Home						Away					
Pld	W	D	L	GF	GA	GD	Pts	W	D	L	GF	GA	GD	W	D	L	GF	GA	GD
34	12	5	17	42	44	−2	41	9	3	5	29	14	+15	3	2	12	13	30	−17

Source: Competitive matches

===== Results by round =====
Round	1	2	3	4	5	6	7	8	9	10	11	12	13	14	15	16	17	18	19	20	21	22	23	24	25	26	27	28	29	30	31	32	33	34
Ground	H	A	H	A	H	A	H	A	H	A	H	A	H	A	A	H	A	A	H	A	H	A	H	A	H	A	H	A	H	A	H	H	A	H
Result	W	W	D	L	L	L	L	L	L	D	W	L	L	L	L	L	L	L	W	W	W	L	D	W	D	D	W	L	W	L	L	W	W	W
Position	2	1	2	3	7	10	14	16	17	17	14	15	15	15	17	17	17	17	17	16	16	16	16	16	16	16	16	16	14	14	13	12	13	13

Source: kicker.de
A = Away; H = Home; W = Win; D = Draw; L = Loss

===== Matches =====
14 August 1999 1	Eintracht Frankfurt	3–0	SpVgg Unterhaching	Frankfurt, Germany
15:30 CEST	Guié-Mien 38'; Fjørtoft 48' (pen.); Salou 88'	(Report)	Kögl (yellow card) 79' (yellow-red card)	Stadium: Waldstadion; Attendance: 40,000; Referee: Kemmling

21 August 1999 2	SC Freiburg	2–3	Eintracht Frankfurt	Freiburg, Germany
15:30 CEST	Sellimi 39'; Güneş 51'	(Report)	Weber 72'; Salou 76', 86'	Stadium: Dreisamstadion; Attendance: 25,000; Referee: Strampe

29 August 1999 3	Eintracht Frankfurt	2–2	MSV Duisburg	Frankfurt, Germany
17:30 CEST	Salou 24'; Guié-Mien 48'	(Report)	Osthoff 37'; Wolters 73'	Stadium: Waldstadion; Attendance: 40,000; Referee: Keßler

12 September 1999 4	TSV 1860 Munich	2–0	Eintracht Frankfurt	Munich, Germany
17:30 CEST	Max 25'; Cerny 83'	(Report)		Stadium: Olympiastadion; Attendance: 32,500; Referee: Fröhlich

18 September 1999 5	Eintracht Frankfurt	1–2	Bayern Munich	Frankfurt, Germany
20:00 CEST	Salou 20'	(Report)	Élber 66'; Kuffour 80'	Stadium: Waldstadion; Attendance: 59,500; Referee: Heynemann

25 September 1999 6	Borussia Dortmund	1–0	Eintracht Frankfurt	Dortmund, Germany
15:30 CEST	Ricken 34'	(Report)		Stadium: Westfalenstadion; Attendance: 68,500; Referee: Dardenne

1 October 1999 7	Eintracht Frankfurt	0–1	VfB Stuttgart	Frankfurt, Germany
20:00 CEST		(Report)	Balakov 48'; Keller (yellow card) 75' (yellow-red card)	Stadium: Waldstadion; Attendance: 30,000; Referee: Steinborn

16 October 1999 8	Hansa Rostock	3–1	Eintracht Frankfurt	Rostock, Germany
15:30 CEST	Brand 35'; Holetschek 66'; Lange 86' (pen.)	(Report)	Fjørtoft 77'	Stadium: Ostseestadion; Attendance: 15,000; Referee: Stark

22 October 1999 9	Eintracht Frankfurt	0–2	FC Schalke 04	Frankfurt, Germany
20:00 CEST		(Report)	Wilmots 52'; Asamoah 83'	Stadium: Waldstadion; Attendance: 34,000; Referee: Fandel

29 October 1999 10	Arminia Bielefeld	1–1	Eintracht Frankfurt	Bielefeld, Germany
19:30 CEST	Bagheri 56'	(Report)	Schur (yellow card) 60' (yellow-red card); Guié-Mien 90'	Stadium: Bielefelder Alm; Attendance: 21,500; Referee: Aust

6 November 1999 11	Eintracht Frankfurt	4–0	Hertha BSC	Frankfurt, Germany
15:30 CEST	Guié-Mien 17'; Weber 22'; Fjørtoft 28'; Heldt 89' (pen.)	(Report)		Stadium: Waldstadion; Attendance: 28,000; Referee: Meyer

19 November 1999 12	Werder Bremen	3–1	Eintracht Frankfurt	Bremen, Germany
20:00 CEST	Aílton 4', 66'; Bode 90'	(Report)	Kutschera 24'	Stadium: Weserstadion; Attendance: 26,000; Referee: Merk

28 November 1999 13	Eintracht Frankfurt	0–1	1. FC Kaiserslautern	Frankfurt, Germany
17:25 CEST		(Report)	Koch 42'	Stadium: Waldstadion; Attendance: 35,000; Referee: Jansen

3 December 1999 14	Hamburger SV	1–0	Eintracht Frankfurt	Hamburg, Germany
20:00 CEST	Yeboah 77'	(Report)		Stadium: Volksparkstadion; Attendance: 14,000; Referee: Zerr

12 December 1999 15	VfL Wolfsburg	1–0	Eintracht Frankfurt	Wolfsburg, Germany
17:25 CEST	Biliškov 57'	(Report)		Stadium: VfL-Stadion; Attendance: 14,000; Referee: Koop

15 December 1999 16	Eintracht Frankfurt	1–2	Bayer Leverkusen	Frankfurt, Germany
20:00 CEST	Fjørtoft 20'	(Report)	Beinlich 49', 88'	Stadium: Waldstadion; Attendance: 21,000; Referee: Fleischer

18 December 1999 17	SSV Ulm 1846	3–0	Eintracht Frankfurt	Ulm, Germany
15:30 CEST	Fonseca 9'; Scharinger 48'; Zdrilic 69'	(Report)		Stadium: Donaustadion; Attendance: 22,500; Referee: Albrecht

6 February 2000 18	SpVgg Unterhaching	1–0	Eintracht Frankfurt	Unterhaching, Germany
17:30 CEST	Rraklli 62'	(Report)		Stadium: Sportpark Unterhaching; Attendance: 9,500; Referee: Aust

9 February 2000 19	Eintracht Frankfurt	2–0	SC Freiburg	Frankfurt, Germany
20:00 CEST	Sobotzik 32'; Mutzel 82'	(Report)	Kondé (red card) 43'	Stadium: Waldstadion; Attendance: 18,500; Referee: Wack

12 February 2000 20	MSV Duisburg	2–3	Eintracht Frankfurt	Duisburg, Germany
15:30 CEST	Emmerling (yellow card) 43' (yellow-red card) Reiss 45', 90'	(Report)	Sobotzik 19', 27'; Schur (yellow card) 39' (yellow-red card) Gebhardt 89'	Stadium: Wedaustadion; Attendance: 12,000; Referee: Heynemann

19 February 2000 21	Eintracht Frankfurt	3–1	TSV 1860 Munich	Frankfurt, Germany
15:30 CEST	Kutschera 6'; Heldt 22'; Salou 55'	(Report)	Schroth 37'	Stadium: Waldstadion; Attendance: 31,000; Referee: Berg

26 February 2000 22	Bayern Munich	4–1	Eintracht Frankfurt	Munich, Germany
15:30 CEST	Zickler 34', 63'; Paulo Sérgio 46' (pen.); Élber 85'	(Report)	Reichenberger 49'	Stadium: Olympiastadion; Attendance: 45,000; Referee: Krug

5 March 2000 23	Eintracht Frankfurt	1–1	Borussia Dortmund	Frankfurt, Germany
15:30 CEST	Fjørtoft 77'	(Report)	Herrlich 5'	Stadium: Waldstadion; Attendance: 41,500; Referee: Fandel

10 March 2000 24	VfB Stuttgart	0–2	Eintracht Frankfurt	Stuttgart, Germany
20:00 CEST		(Report)	Yang 60'; Gebhardt 80'	Stadium: Gottlieb-Daimler-Stadion; Attendance: 25,000; Referee: Merk

17 March 2000 25	Eintracht Frankfurt	0–0	Hansa Rostock	Frankfurt, Germany
20:00 CEST		(Report)		Stadium: Waldstadion; Attendance: 32,000; Referee: Wack

26 March 2000 26	FC Schalke 04	0–0	Eintracht Frankfurt	Gelsenkirchen, Germany
17:30 CEST		(Report)		Stadium: Parkstadion; Attendance: 42,000; Referee: Stark

1 April 2000 27	Eintracht Frankfurt	2–1	Arminia Bielefeld	Frankfurt, Germany
15:30 CEST	Zampach 39'; Schur 73'	(Report)	Weissenberger 61'	Stadium: Waldstadion; Attendance: 27,000; Referee: Koop

8 April 2000 28	Hertha BSC	1–0	Eintracht Frankfurt	Berlin, Germany
15:30 CEST	Preetz 37'	(Report)		Stadium: Olympiastadion; Attendance: 42,500; Referee: Jansen

12 April 2000 29	Eintracht Frankfurt	1–0	Werder Bremen	Frankfurt, Germany
20:00 CEST	Heldt 70' (pen.)	(Report)		Stadium: Waldstadion; Attendance: 30,500; Referee: Heynemann

15 April 2000 30	1. FC Kaiserslautern	1–0	Eintracht Frankfurt	Kaiserslautern, Germany
15:30 CEST	Reich 57'	(Report)		Stadium: Fritz-Walter-Stadion; Attendance: 41,500; Referee: Fleischer

20 April 2000 31	Eintracht Frankfurt	3–0	Hamburger SV	Frankfurt, Germany
20:00 CEST	Guié-Mien 6', 76'; Yang 71'	(Report)		Stadium: Waldstadion; Attendance: 50,000; Referee: Fandel

28 April 2000 32	Eintracht Frankfurt	4–0	VfL Wolfsburg	Frankfurt, Germany
15:30 CEST	Salou 8'; Gebhardt 16'; Yang 77', 79'	(Report)		Stadium: Waldstadion; Attendance: 34,000; Referee: Krug

13 May 2000 33	Bayer Leverkusen	4–1	Eintracht Frankfurt	Leverkusen, Germany
15:30 CEST	Neuville 10'; Kirsten 56'; Rink 72'; Beinlich 81' (pen.)	(Report)	Kracht 40'	Stadium: BayArena; Attendance: 22,500; Referee: Merk

20 May 2000 34	Eintracht Frankfurt	2–1	SSV Ulm 1846	Frankfurt, Germany
15:30 CEST	Salou 24'; Heldt 90' (pen.)	(Report)	van de Haar 41'	Stadium: Waldstadion; Attendance: 58,000; Referee: Krug

==== DFB-Pokal ====
8 August 1999 Second round	SC Verl	0–4	Eintracht Frankfurt	Verl, Germany
		(Report)	Kracht 22'; Weber 57' (pen.); Fjørtoft 88', 90'	Stadium: Stadion an der Poststraße; Attendance: 4,000; Referee: Koop

12 October 1999 Third round	1. FC Köln	2–1	Eintracht Frankfurt	Cologne, Germany
20:00 CEST	Donkov 45'; Lottner 45'	(Report)	Gebhardt 47'	Stadium: Müngersdorfer Stadion; Attendance: 32,000; Referee: Albrecht

== Players ==
=== First-team squad ===
Squad at end of season

Note: Flags indicate national team as defined under FIFA eligibility rules; some limited exceptions apply. Players may hold more than one non-FIFA nationality.

No.	Pos.	Nation	Player
1	GK	MKD	Oka Nikolov (Note: Nikolov was born in Erbach im Odenwald, West Germany (now Germany), but also qualified to represent Macedonia (now North Macedonia) internationally and made his international debut for Macedonia in September 1998.)
2	DF	GER	Torsten Kracht
3	MF	GER	Marco Gebhardt
4	DF	GER	Jens Rasiejewski
5	DF	BUL	Petar Hubchev
6	DF	GER	Thomas Zampach
7	MF	POL	Thomas Sobotzik
8	MF	GER	Ralf Weber
9	FW	NOR	Jan Åge Fjørtoft
10	MF	GER	Horst Heldt
11	FW	TOG	Bachirou Salou
12	GK	GER	Dirk Heinen
13	DF	TUR	Erol Bulut (Note: Bulut was born in Bad Schwalbach, West Germany (now Germany), but also qualified to represent Turkey internationally and represented Turkey at U-21 level and in futsal.)
14	DF	GER	Uwe Schneider

No.	Pos.	Nation	Player
15	MF	CGO	Rolf-Christel Guié-Mien
16	MF	GER	Olaf Janßen
17	FW	GER	Thomas Reichenberger
18	DF	GER	Alexander Kutschera
19	MF	GER	Patrick Falk
20	DF	GER	Uwe Bindewald
21	FW	CHN	Yang Chen
23	GK	GER	Sven Schmitt
24	MF	GER	Alexander Schur
25	MF	RSA	Rowan Hendricks
26	DF	GER	Giuseppe Gemiti
28	MF	GER	Albert Streit (Note: Streit was born in Bucharest, Romania, but was raised in Germany and represented Germany at U-16, U-17, U-18 and B level.)
29	MF	GER	Stefan Zinnow
33	MF	GER	Michael Mutzel

=== Left club during season ===
Note: Flags indicate national team as defined under FIFA eligibility rules; some limited exceptions apply. Players may hold more than one non-FIFA nationality.

No.	Pos.	Nation	Player
22	MF	HUN	Tibor Dombi (to FC Utrecht)
25	MF	GER	Alexander Rosen (on loan to Augsburg)

No.	Pos.	Nation	Player
26	DF	NGA	Donald Agu (to SSV Reutlingen 05)
30	MF	AUT	Christoph Westerthaler (to FSV Frankfurt)

=== Eintracht Frankfurt II ===
Note: Flags indicate national team as defined under FIFA eligibility rules; some limited exceptions apply. Players may hold more than one non-FIFA nationality.

No.	Pos.	Nation	Player
39	DF	CMR	Jean-Paul Ndeki
—	DF	CRO	Vladimir Maljković

No.	Pos.	Nation	Player
—	MF	GER	Frank Gerster

=== Under-19s ===
Note: Flags indicate national team as defined under FIFA eligibility rules; some limited exceptions apply. Players may hold more than one non-FIFA nationality.

No. / Pos. / Nation / Player; — / DF / GER / Christoph Preuß	No. / Pos. / Nation / Player; — / MF / GER / Jermaine Jones (Note: Jones was born in Frankfurt, West Germany (now Germany), and represented Germany at U-20, U-21 and B level before making his international debut for Germany in 2008, but also qualified to represent the United States internationally through his father and made his international debut for the United States in October 2010.)

=== Under-17s ===
Note: Flags indicate national team as defined under FIFA eligibility rules; some limited exceptions apply. Players may hold more than one non-FIFA nationality.

No.	Pos.	Nation	Player
—	GK	GER	Daniel Haas
—	DF	GER	Baldo di Gregorio

No.	Pos.	Nation	Player
—	MF	GER	Daniyel Cimen

== Statistics ==
=== Appearances and goals ===
No.	Pos	Nat	Player	Total		Bundesliga		DFB-Pokal	
No.	Pos	Nat	Player	Apps	Goals	Apps	Goals	Apps	Goals
1	GK	(North Macedonia) MKD	Oka Nikolov	19	0	17	0	2	0
2	DF	(Germany) GER	Torsten Kracht	34	2	32	1	2	1
3	MF	(Germany) GER	Marco Gebhardt	32	4	30	3	2	1
4	MF	(Germany) GER	Jens Rasiejewski	22	0	21	0	1	0
5	DF	(Bulgaria) BUL	Petar Hubchev	18	0	18	0	0	0
6	MF	(Germany) GER	Thomas Zampach	12	1	11	1	1	0
7	FW	(Germany) GER	~~Thomas Epp~~	0	0	0	0	0	0
7	MF	(Germany) GER	Thomas Sobotzik	12	3	12	3	0	0
8	DF	(Germany) GER	Ralf Weber	20	3	18	2	2	1
9	FW	(Norway) NOR	Jan Åge Fjørtoft	22	7	21	5	1	2
10	MF	(Germany) GER	Horst Heldt	32	4	30	4	2	0
11	FW	(Togo) TOG	Bachirou Salou	33	8	32	8	1	0
12	GK	(Germany) GER	Dirk Heinen	17	0	17	0	0	0
14	DF	(Germany) GER	Uwe Schneider	7	0	7	0	0	0
15	MF	(Republic of the Congo) CGO	Rolf-Christel Guié-Mien	31	6	29	6	2	0
16	DF	(Germany) GER	Olaf Janßen	18	0	16	0	2	0
17	MF	(Turkey) TUR	~~Erol Bulut~~	6	0	5	0	1	0
17	FW	(Germany) GER	Thomas Reichenberger	15	1	15	1	0	0
18	DF	(Germany) GER	Alexander Kutschera	30	1	29	1	1	0
19	MF	(Germany) GER	Patrick Falk	14	0	13	0	1	0
20	DF	(Germany) GER	Uwe Bindewald	22	0	20	0	2	0
21	FW	(China) CHN	Yang Chen	28	4	27	4	1	0
22	MF	(Hungary) HUN	Tibor Dombi	17	0	15	0	2	0
23	GK	(Germany) GER	Sven Schmitt	0	0	0	0	0	0
24	MF	(Germany) GER	Alexander Schur	26	2	26	2	0	0
25	MF	(Germany) GER	~~Alexander Rosen~~	0	0	0	0	0	0
25	MF	(South Africa) RSA	Rowan Hendricks	1	0	1	0	0	0
26	DF	(Nigeria) NGA	~~Donald Agu~~	0	0	0	0	0	0
30	FW	(Austria) AUT	~~Christoph Westerthaler~~	5	0	4	0	1	0
33	MF	(Germany) GER	Michael Mutzel	4	1	4	1	0	0

=== Transfers ===
==== Summer ====
In:

No.	Pos.	Nation	Player
2	MF	GER	Torsten Kracht (from VfL Bochum)
4	MF	GER	Jens Rasiejewski (from Hannover 96)
10	MF	GER	Horst Heldt (from TSV 1860 Munich)
11	MF	TOG	Bachirou Salou (from Borussia Dortmund)
15	MF	CGO	Rolf-Christel Guié-Mien (from Karlsruher SC)
17	MF	TUR	Erol Bulut (from Fenerbahçe)
19	MF	GER	Patrick Falk (from Bayer Leverkusen II)
22	MF	HUN	Tibor Dombi (loaned from Debreceni VSC)

Out:

No.	Pos.	Nation	Player
2	MF	GER	Sascha Amstätter (to Bayer Uerdingen)
4	DF	NOR	Tore Pedersen (to Wimbledon FC)
4	MF	GER	Thorsten Flick (to 1. FC Saarbrücken)
7	FW	GER	Thomas Epp (to Admira Wacker Mödling)
10	MF	GER	Thomas Sobotzik (to 1. FC Kaiserslautern)
12	GK	HUN	Zsolt Petry (to MTK Budapest)
15	MF	GER	Bernd Schneider (to Bayer Leverkusen)
17	MF	HUN	István Pisont (to Hapoel Tel Aviv)
19	MF	BRA	Antônio da Silva (to SV Wehen)
22	MF	TUR	Burhanettin Kaymak (to Göztepe SK)
22	MF	HUN	Tibor Dombi (to Debreceni VSC)
25	MF	GER	Alexander Rosen (to FC Augsburg)
26	DF	NGA	Donald Agu (to SSV Reutlingen)
26	FW	YUG	Damir Stojak (loan return to SSC Napoli)
32	MF	GER	Ansgar Brinkmann (to Tennis Borussia Berlin)
35	MF	GER	Mourad Bounoua (to Hannover 96)

==== Winter ====
In:

No.	Pos.	Nation	Player
7	MF	GER	Thomas Sobotzik (from 1. FC Kaiserslautern)
12	MF	GER	Dirk Heinen (from Bayer Leverkusen)
17	MF	GER	Thomas Reichenberger (from Bayer Leverkusen)

Out:

No.	Pos.	Nation	Player
16	MF	GER	Olaf Janßen (loaned to AC Bellinzona)
17	MF	TUR	Erol Bulut (loaned to Trabzonspor)
30	FW	AUT	Christoph Westerthaler (to FSV Frankfurt)

== Sources ==
- Matheja, Ulrich (2011). Unsere Eintracht - Eintracht Frankfurt - Die Chronik. Die Werkstatt. ISBN 978-3-89533-750-5.
