= Blau-Weiß Berlin =

Blau-Weiß Berlin may refer to:

- Blau-Weiß 1890 Berlin, a German championship-winning football club; dissolved in 1992
- SpVg Blau-Weiß 90 Berlin, the successor team to the above-named club; established in 1992
