= Ali Amiri =

Ali Amiri may refer to:

- Ali Amiri (historian) (1857–1923), Ottoman historian
- Ali Amiri (Afghan footballer) (born 1985), former German-Afghan footballer
- Ali Amiri (Iranian footballer) (born 1988), Iranian footballer for Rah Ahan
- Ali Amiri (Algerian footballer) (born 1987)
