= Ali Amiri (Afghan footballer) =

German-Afghan footballer

Personal information
- Full name: Ali Amiri
- Date of birth: 23 September 1985 (age 41)
- Place of birth: Kabul, Afghanistan
- Position: Forward

Team information
- Current team: TSG Wörsdorf

Youth career
- –2000: FSV Frankfurt
- 2000–2002: Eintracht Frankfurt

Senior career*
Years	Team	Apps	(Gls)
2002–2006	Eintracht Frankfurt II	26	(11)
2006–2007	TSG Wörsdorf	10	(3)
Total		36	(14)

International career
2002–2004	Afghanistan	2	(0)
- * Club domestic league appearances and goals

Ali Amiri (Persian: علی امیری; born 23 September 1985 in Kabul) is a former German-Afghan footballer who lastly played for TSG Worsdorf.

== Club career ==
Amiri began his career with FSV Frankfurt and joined in summer 2000 to Eintracht Frankfurt. After two years in the youth side for Eintracht Frankfurt was 2002 promoted to the reserve team. He played four years for Eintracht Frankfurt II and signed than in July 2006 for TSG Wörsdorf. Amiri played only ten games and scored three goals for TSG Wörsdorf in the 2006/2007 season and retired on the end of the season.

== International career ==
Amiri made two appearances for Afghanistan between 2002 and 2004.

== Career statistics ==
=== Club ===
Club performance			League		Cup		League Cup		Continental		Total	
Season	Club	League	Apps	Goals	Apps	Goals	Apps	Goals	Apps	Goals	Apps	Goals
Germany			League		DFB-Pokal		Other		Europe		Total	
2002–03	Eintracht Frankfurt II	Regionalliga Süd	0	0	-		-		-		0	0
2003–04	Eintracht Frankfurt II	Hessenliga	0	0	-		-		-		0	0
2004–05	Eintracht Frankfurt II	Hessenliga	16	6	-		-		-		16	6
2005–06	Eintracht Frankfurt II	Hessenliga	10	5	-		-		-		10	5
2006–07	TSG Wörsdorf	Hessenliga	10	3	-		-		-		10	3
Total	Country		36	14	-		-		-		36	14
Career total			36	14	-		-		-		36	14

=== International ===
Appearances and goals by national team and year
National team	Year	Apps	Goals
Afghanistan	2002	1	0
Afghanistan	2003	0	0
Afghanistan	2004	1	0
Total		2	0
