= Eliran Elkayam =

Israeli football player

Eliran Elkayam אלירן אלקיים
Personal information
- Full name: Eliran Elkayam
- Date of birth: October 30, 1976 (age 50)
- Place of birth: Kiryat Ata, Israel
- Position: Defender

Youth career
- Maccabi Haifa

Senior career*
Years	Team	Apps	(Gls)
1994–2001	Maccabi Haifa	37	(0)
1996–1997	→ Maccabi Petah Tikva (loan)		
2001–2002	Hapoel Haifa	31	(2)
2002–2003	Hapoel Petah Tikva	28	(0)
2003–2004	Hapoel Haifa		
2004–2006	Hapoel Nazareth Illit	31	(3)
2006–2007	Bnei Yehuda	2	(0)
2007–2008	Hapoel Nazareth Illit	10	(0)
2008	Hapoel Haifa	14	(1)
2008–2010	Beitar Shimshon Tel Aviv	24	(2)
2010–2011	Maccabi Kafr Kanna	23	(6)
2011–2012	Maccabi Ironi Kiryat Ata	27	(1)
- * Club domestic league appearances and goals as of March 7, 2007

Eliran Elkayam (Hebrew: אלירן אלקיים; born October 30, 1976) is an Israeli football player.
