= Thomas Zampach =

German footballer & coach (born 1969)

Personal information
- Date of birth: December 27, 1969 (age 56)
- Place of birth: Frankfurt am Main, West Germany
- Height: 1.75 m (5 ft 9 in)
- Position: Defender

Youth career
- FV Bad Vilbel
- TSG Frankfurter Berg
- Kickers Offenbach

Senior career*
| Years | Team | Apps | (Gls) |
| 1988–1991 | Kickers Offenbach | | |
| 1991–1996 | 1. FSV Mainz 05 | 131 | (10) |
| 1996–1997 | SV Wehen | | |
| 1997–2000 | Eintracht Frankfurt | 64 | (3) |
| 2001–2002 | Eintracht Frankfurt Amat. | 23 | (0) |
| 2002–2003 | TSG Wörsdorf | 22 | (1) |
| 2003–2004 | retired | | |
| 2004–2007 | SV Wehen II | | |
| 2007–2009 | FC Schlossborn | | |

Managerial career
- 2003–2006: Eintracht Frankfurt (scout)
- 2004–2007: SV Wehen II (player-coach)
- 2007–2009: SV Wehen Wiesbaden II (assistant)
- 2009–2010: SV Wehen Wiesbaden II
- 2010–2012: SV Darmstadt 98 (assistant)
- 2012–2013: SV Zeilsheim
- 2017–2018: FV Stierstadt
- 2020–2021: SG Harheim
- * Club domestic league appearances and goals

Thomas Zampach (born December 27, 1969) is a German former footballer who became a coach. He is currently kicker for the Frankfurt Galaxy.

== Soccer career ==
He made his debut on the professional league level in the 2. Bundesliga for 1. FSV Mainz 05 on August 13, 1991, when he came on as a substitute in the 70th minute in a game against FC Rot-Weiß Erfurt.

== American football career ==
From 2013 to 2015 he was the kicker of the Frankfurt Universe in the German Football League 2. On March 13, 2022, the Frankfurt Galaxy of the European League of Football signed him to their roster, making him the oldest player in the league to this date with 52.

=== Professional statistics ===
| Year | Team | GP | Kicking | | | | | | |
| Year | Team | GP | PATM | PATA | PAT% | FGM | FGA | FG% | Pts |
|---|---|---|---|---|---|---|---|---|---|
European League of Football
| 2022 | Frankfurt Galaxy | 0 | 0 | 0 | 0 | 0 | 0 | 0 | 0 |
| ELF total | | 0 | 0 | 0 | 0 | 0 | 0 | 0 | 0 |
Source: europeanleague.football
