= Burhanettin Kaymak =

Turkish footballer

Personal information
- Date of birth: 25 August 1973 (age 53)
- Place of birth: Bayburt, Turkey
- Height: 1.81 m (5 ft 11 in)
- Position: Defender

Youth career
- –1990: SG Rosenhöhe
- 1990–1992: Eintracht Frankfurt

Senior career*
| Years | Team | Apps | (Gls) |
| 1992–1995 | Eintracht Frankfurt II | | |
| 1995–1996 | Eintracht Frankfurt | 2 | (0) |
| 1996 | Galatasaray | 0 | (0) |
| 1997–1999 | Eintracht Frankfurt | 15 | (0) |
| 1999–2001 | Göztepe | 30 | (0) |
| 2001 | Siirtspor | 8 | (0) |
| 2001–2004 | Wehen Wiesbaden | 81 | (0) |
| 2004–2007 | 1. FC Eschborn | | |
| 2007 | TSG Wörsdorf | | |
| 2007–2010 | 1. FC Eschborn | | |
| 2010–2011 | TSG Wörsdorf | | |

International career
| 1994 | Turkey U21 | 1 | (0) |

Managerial career
- 2010–2011: TSG Wörsdorf
- * Club domestic league appearances and goals

Burhanettin "Spezi" Kaymak (born 25 August 1973) is a former Turkish footballer who played as a defender. He also holds German citizenship. At his last club TSG Wörsdorf he served as the player-manager and resigned on 11 November 2011 for private and job-related reasons.
