= Patrick Falk =

German footballer (born 1980)

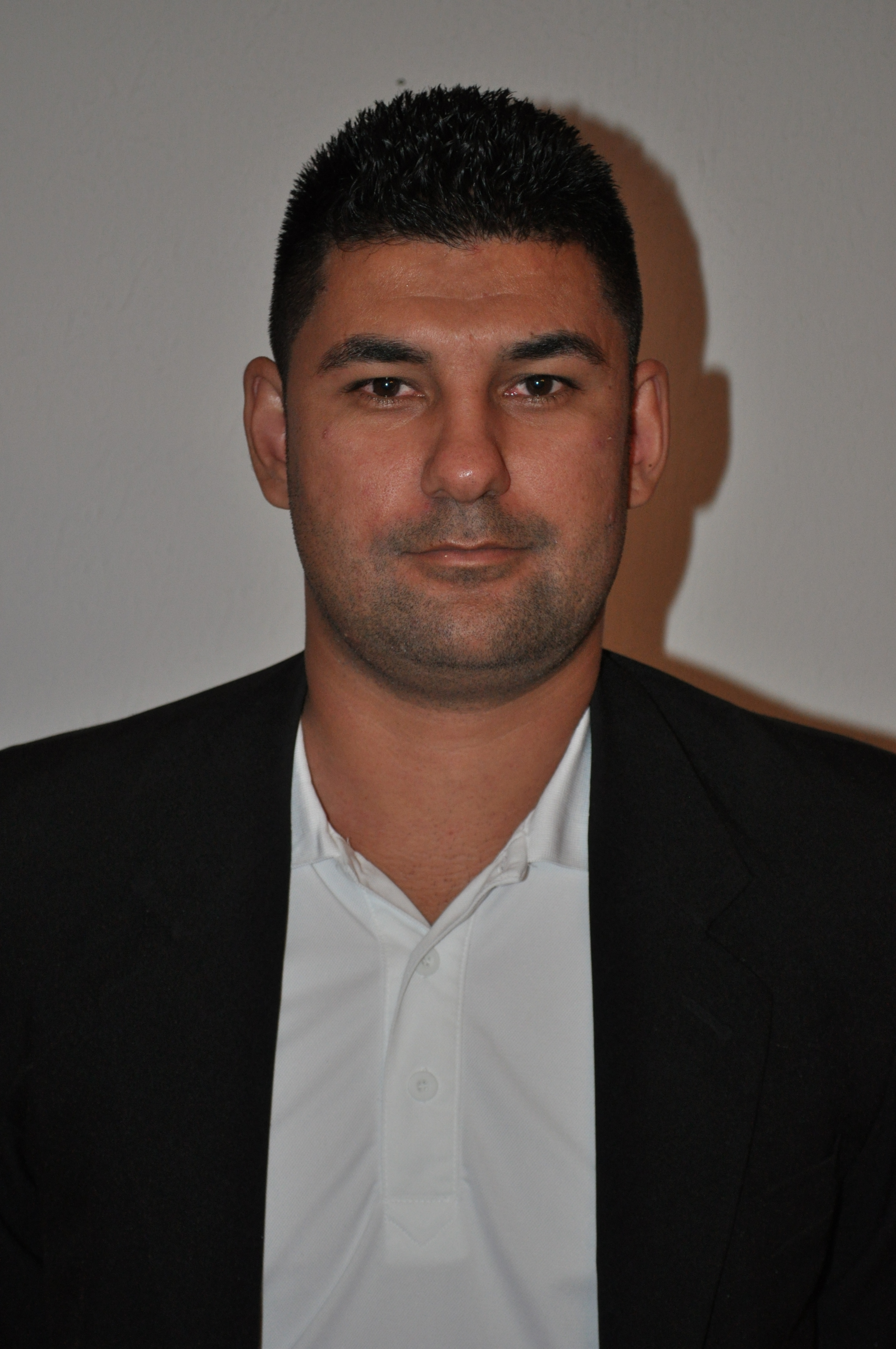

Personal information
- Date of birth: 8 February 1980 (age 46)
- Place of birth: Frankfurt, West Germany
- Height: 1.71 m (5 ft 7 in)
- Position: Midfielder

Youth career
- FSV Viktoria Lieblos
- Bayer Leverkusen

Senior career*
Years	Team	Apps	(Gls)
1999–2000	Eintracht Frankfurt	13	(0)
2000–2001	Eintracht Braunschweig	19	(5)
2001–2002	Rot-Weiß Oberhausen	13	(1)
2002–2003	Kickers Offenbach	29	(5)
2004	FC Sachsen Leipzig	6	(0)
2004	SV Buchonia Flieden		
2005–2012	KG Wittgenborn		

International career
1995	Germany U17	3	(0)
1999	Germany U20	3	(1)
1999–2000	Germany U21	4	(1)

Managerial career
- 2005–2012: KG Wittgenborn (playing manager)
- 2012–2015: Spvgg 1910 Langenselbold
- * Club domestic league appearances and goals

Patrick Falk (born 8 February 1980) is a German football manager and former player. He made his debut on the professional league level in the Bundesliga for Eintracht Frankfurt on 14 August 1999 when he came on as a substitute in the 67th minute in a game against SpVgg Unterhaching.
