= Dalibor Slezák =

Czech footballer

Personal information
- Date of birth: 28 January 1970 (age 56)
- Place of birth: Kroměříž, Czechoslovakia
- Position: Forward

Youth career
- 1978–1990: Slavia Kroměříž

Senior career*
Years	Team	Apps	(Gls)
1991–1992	Dukla Tábor		
1992–1993	Baník Ostrava		
1993–1994	Slovan Liberec		
1994–1995	Baník Ostrava		
1995	Sigma Olomouc		
1996	SK Hradec Králové		
1997–1998	Bohemians Prague		
1998–2000	FK Jablonec 97		
2000	Guangzhou Matsunichi		
2000–2001	FK Jablonec 97	15	(0)
2001	FK Mladá Boleslav		
2002–2003	Synot Staré Město	23	(0)
2003–2004	Vyškov		
2004–2005	Sparta Krč		
2005–2010	Bohemians 1905		
- * Club domestic league appearances and goals

Dalibor Slezák (born 28 January 1970) is a former Czech football player.

Slezák played for various Czech football clubs but is best known as a player of Bohemians Prague, where he is perceived by fans as a legendary player. He ended his rich football career at the age of 40 after the last match of the 2009-2010 season.
