= Sven Schmitt =

German footballer

Personal information
- Date of birth: December 27, 1976 (age 49)
- Height: 1.86 m (6 ft 1 in)
- Position: Goalkeeper

Youth career
- TSV Hanau

Senior career*
Years	Team	Apps	(Gls)
1996–2001	Eintracht Frankfurt	5	(0)
2001–2003	Eintracht Frankfurt II	35	(0)
2003–2006	1. FC Eschborn		
2006–2007	SV Darmstadt 98	14	(0)
2007–2008	TSG Wörsdorf	25	(0)
2008–2010	Viktoria Aschaffenburg	14	(0)
- * Club domestic league appearances and goals as of 14:14, 3 February 2009 (UTC)

Sven Schmitt (born December 27, 1976) is a German former footballer. He made his debut on the professional league level in the 2. Bundesliga for Eintracht Frankfurt on September 15, 1996 when he started in a game against SpVgg Unterhaching.
