= Alexander Rosen =

German former football player (born 1979)

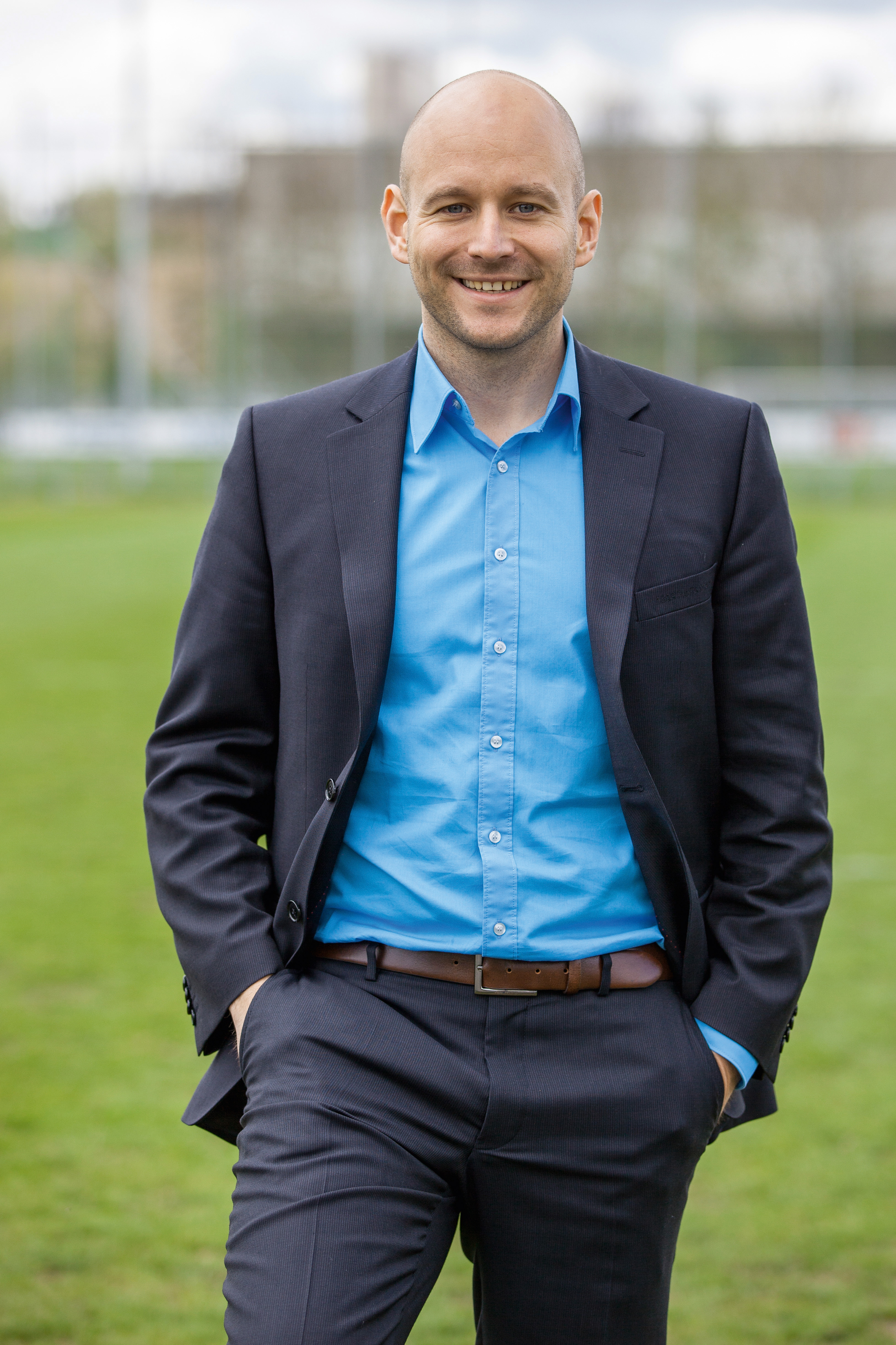

Personal information
- Date of birth: 10 April 1979 (age 47)
- Place of birth: Augsburg, West Germany
- Height: 1.84 m (6 ft 0 in)
- Position: Midfielder

Youth career
- SV Mering
- SC Fürstenfeldbruck
- FC Augsburg

Senior career*
Years	Team	Apps	(Gls)
1997–1998	FC Augsburg	0	(0)
1998–2002	Eintracht Frankfurt	10	(0)
1999–2000	→ FC Augsburg (loan)	20	(1)
2001	→ VfL Osnabrück (loan)	12	(1)
2002–2004	1. FC Saarbrücken	36	(2)
2004–2005	SV Elversberg	28	(0)
2005–2007	Follo FK	50	(11)
2008–2009	Stuttgarter Kickers	32	(2)
2009–2011	TSG 1899 Hoffenheim II	37	(0)
Total		225	(17)

International career
1999–2000	Germany U-21	7	(0)
- * Club domestic league appearances and goals

Alexander Rosen (born 10 April 1979) is a German football executive and former player who was most recently the director of football for TSG 1899 Hoffenheim.

== Playing career ==
Rosen made his Bundesliga debut for Eintracht Frankfurt on 20 February 1999 when he came on as a substitute for Frank Gerster in the 86th minute against TSV 1860 München. While under contract with Frankfurt, Rosen went on loan with FC Augsburg and VfL Osnabrück. After his return to Frankfurt, he played in three more matches in the 2. Bundesliga before leaving for 1. FC Saarbrücken prior to the 2003–04 season. After a short stint with Sportvereinigung Elversberg, he switched to Norwegian club Follo Fotball in December 2005. In Norway, Rosen also worked as an assistant for the club's management. After his two-year-stint with Follo, he moved to the Stuttgarter Kickers in the Regionalliga Süd. Rosen finished his playing career at Hoffenheim, playing his last match in December 2010.

== Management career ==
Rosen started his formal training as a sports business administrator in 2009 while still playing professional football, enrolling at the University of Applied Sciences at Schmalkalden to study sports economics. In November 2010, Rosen became Hoffenheim's development performance centre manager. In April 2013, he was promoted to head of professional football at Hoffenheim. Since October 2013, his official job title has been director of football. Rosen has been frequently praised for Hoffenheim's ability to remain competitive in the Bundesliga despite its relatively small size and budget, relying on successful player development and innovative transfer moves. In July 2022, his contract was extended to 2025. In July 2024, he was relieved of his duties as TSG Hoffenheim's managing director for sport, ending his 15-year tenure with the club.

== Family ==
Rosen is married and has a son. His grandfather, Gerhard Niklasch, was a team captain and the record appearance-maker at BC Augsburg in the Oberliga Süd, the highest league in Germany at the time. Among others, Niklasch played with German football legend Helmut Haller.
