= SpVg Blau-Weiß 90 Berlin =

SpVgg Blau-Weiß 90 Berlin
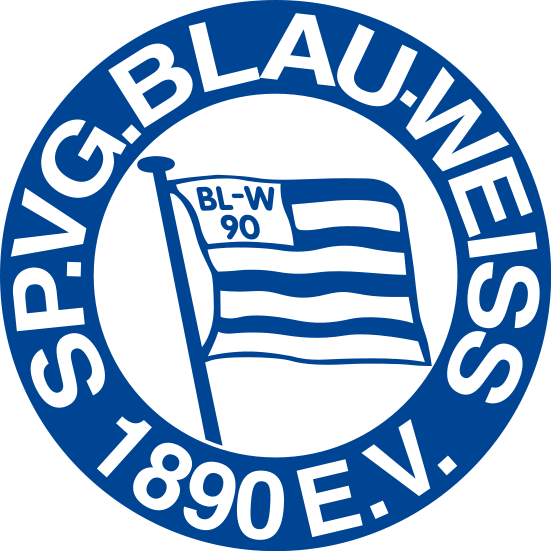
- Full name: Sportliche Vereinigung Blau-Weiß 1890 e.V.
- Founded: 20 June 1992; 33 years ago
- Ground: Platz an der Rathausstraße
- Capacity: 3,000
- Chairman: Michael Meister
- Head coach: Marco Gebhardt
- League: NOFV-Oberliga Nord
- 2021–22: NOFV-Oberliga Nord (V), 5th of 19
Home colours	Away colours

SpVg Blau-Weiß 90 Berlin is a German football club based in the locality of Mariendorf in the borough of Tempelhof-Schöneberg in Berlin. The team is currently playing in the NOFV-Oberliga (V).

== History ==
Former crest of the club

SpVg Blau-Weiß 90 Berlin's predecessor club, SpVgg Blau-Weiß 1890 Berlin, was declared bankrupt and folded on 28 June 1992. As a result, then-named SV Blau Weiss Berlin was established as an indirect successor club, similar to SV Tasmania-Gropiusstadt 1973. The team entered into the lowest possible local league, the 3. Kreisklasse Staffel C, and have even made it as high as the Landesliga-Berlin in recent years before being relegated again.

A Landesliga championship in 2015–16 took the club up to the Berlin-Liga for the following season. The club renamed itself Blau-Weiß 90 Berlin on 16 June 2015 after a general meeting, in reference to its predecessor's name.
