= Henry Isaac =

Nigerian footballer (born 1980)

Personal information
- Date of birth: 14 February 1980 (age 46)
- Place of birth: Owerri, Nigeria
- Height: 6 ft 2 in (1.88 m)
- Position: Forward

Senior career*
| Years | Team | Apps | (Gls) |
| 1997–1998 | Iwuanyanwo Nationale | | |
| 1998–1999 | Eintracht Frankfurt | 4 | (0) |
| 1998–2002 | Eintracht Frankfurt II | | |
| 2002–2003 | Waldhof Mannheim | 7 | (0) |
| 2003–2006 | FC St. Pauli | 6 | (2) |
| 2004–2006 | → Veria (loan) | 3 | (0) |
| 2006 | Sandefjord Fotball | 2 | (0) |
| 2007 | Fram Reykjavík | 1 | (0) |
| 2009 | FSV Neuburg | | |
| 2009 | Vittoriosa Stars | 0 | (0) |
| 2009–2010 | Sliema Wanderers | 5 | (1) |
| 2010 | Xagħra United | | |
| 2011 | BFC Siófok | 7 | (0) |
| 2011–2012 | Vittoriosa Stars | | |

International career
| 2000–2003 | Nigeria | 2 | (0) |
- * Club domestic league appearances and goals

Henry Isaac (born 14 February 1980), formerly known as Henry Nwosu, is a Nigerian former professional footballer who played as a forward.

== Career ==
Born in Owerri, Isaac began his career in Iwuanyanwu Nationale. In 1998, he moved to Eintracht Frankfurt. He made his debut in the Bundesliga in 1998 against FC Schalke 04. After his time at Eintracht Frankfurt he played in the 2. Bundesliga with Waldhof Mannheim and FC St. Pauli.
