= Ansgar Brinkmann =

German footballer

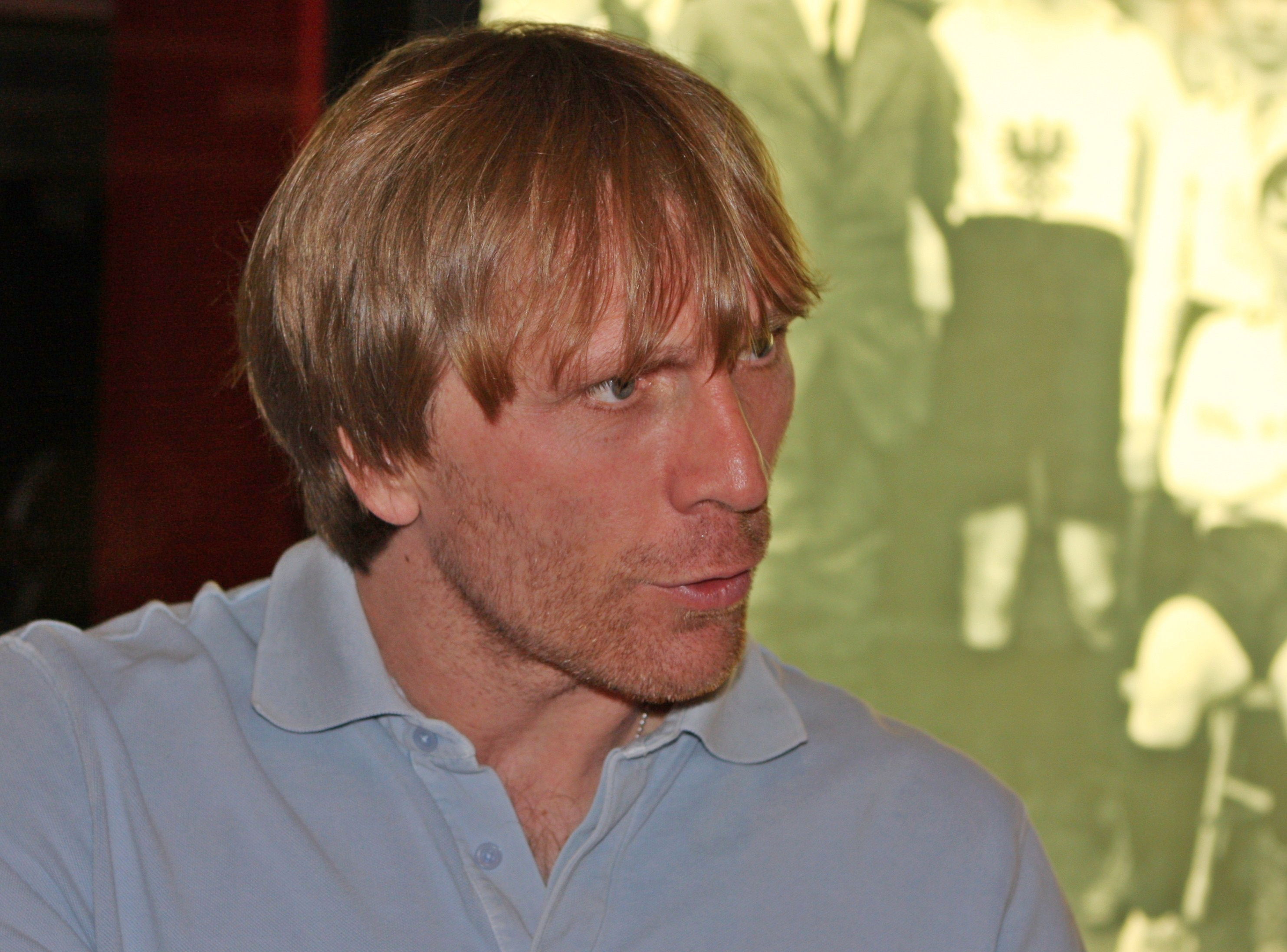
- Brinkmann in 2008

Personal information
- Date of birth: 5 July 1969 (age 57)
- Place of birth: Vechta, West Germany
- Height: 1.81 m (5 ft 11 in)
- Positions: Midfielder; forward

Youth career
- SC Schwarz-Weiß Bakum
- Blau-Weiß Lohne
- FC Bayer Uerdingen 05

Senior career*
Years	Team	Apps	(Gls)
1987–1990	VfL Osnabrück	96	(6)
1991–1993	Preußen Münster	17	(2)
1993–1995	Mainz 05	55	(7)
1995	Preußen Münster	13	(2)
1996	FC Gütersloh	20	(2)
1996	SC Verl	5	(1)
1997	BV Cloppenburg	0	(0)
1997–1999	Eintracht Frankfurt	46	(4)
1999–2000	Tennis Borussia Berlin	29	(1)
2000–2001	VfL Osnabrück	24	(4)
2001–2003	Arminia Bielefeld	57	(7)
2003	LR Ahlen	4	(0)
2004	→ FC Kärnten (loan)	0	(0)
2004	LR Ahlen	0	(0)
2005	Dynamo Dresden	27	(4)
2006–2007	Preußen Münster	33	(3)
Total		426	(43)
- * Club domestic league appearances and goals

Ansgar Brinkmann (born 5 July 1969) is a German former professional footballer who played as a midfielder or forward.

== Playing career ==
Brinkmann was born in Vechta. He played two seasons in the Bundesliga with Eintracht Frankfurt and Arminia Bielefeld. He also played 316 games in the 2. Bundesliga for nine different teams.

== Post-playing career ==
Brinkmann stayed in the focus of the German public football sphere. He worked as pundit and published a couple of books.
