= Zsolt Petry =

Hungarian footballer and coach

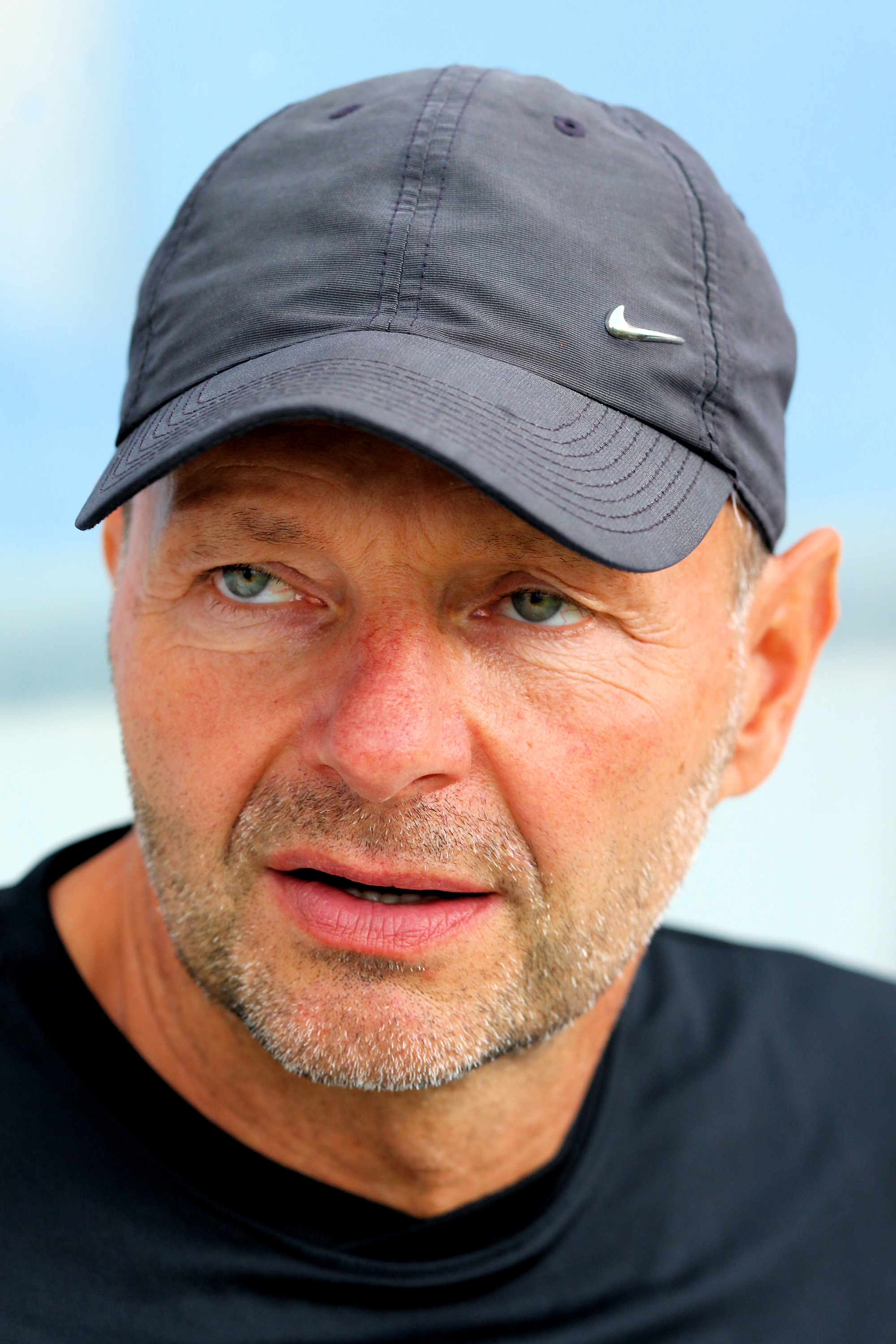
- Petry in 2019

Personal information
- Date of birth: 23 September 1966 (age 60)
- Place of birth: Budapest, Hungary
- Position: Goalkeeper

Senior career*
Years	Team	Apps	(Gls)
1985–1987	MTK Hungária	5	(0)
1987–1990	Videoton FC	72	(0)
1990–1991	Budapest Honvéd	30	(0)
1991–1995	Gent	118	(0)
1995–1996	Gençlerbirliği	30	(0)
1996–1997	Charleroi	31	(0)
1997–1998	Feyenoord	0	(0)
1998–1999	Eintracht Frankfurt	0	(0)
1999–2000	MTK Hungária	0	(0)
2000	Kotkan TP	13	(0)
2001	Dunaferr SE	7	(0)
2001	SC Paderborn	4	(0)
2002–2004	SV Babelsberg 03		(0)

International career
1988–1996	Hungary	38	(0)
1991	World Team	1	(0)

Managerial career
- 2004–2009: SC Paderborn (Goalkeeping coach)
- 2008–2010: Hungary (Goalkeeping coach)
- 2009–2015: 1899 Hoffenheim (Goalkeeping coach)
- 2015–2021: Hertha BSC (Goalkeeping coach)
- 2023–: Samsunspor (Goalkeeping coach)
- * Club domestic league appearances and goals

Zsolt Petry (born 23 September 1966) is a Hungarian former professional football who played as a goalkeeper and works as goalkeeping coach.

== Criticism ==
On 5 April 2021, Petry was heavily criticised on social media for homophobic and anti-immigrant statements he made in an interview in Hungarian newspaper Magyar Nemzet. The following day Hertha BSC fired him from his position as goalkeeping coach, stating that his remarks were incompatible with the club's values.
