= Alexander Kutschera =

German footballer

Personal information
- Full name: Alexander Kutschera
- Date of birth: 21 March 1968 (age 58)
- Place of birth: Freising, Germany
- Height: 1.84 m (6 ft 0 in)
- Position: Defender

Youth career
- SG Eichenfeld
- Eintracht Freising

Senior career*
Years	Team	Apps	(Gls)
1986–1989	Bayern Munich II		
1987	Bayern Munich	0	(0)
1989–1991	Blau-Weiß Berlin	73	(0)
1991–1994	Bayer Uerdingen	89	(2)
1994–1997	1860 Munich	53	(3)
1997–2001	Eintracht Frankfurt	129	(3)
2001–2003	Xerez CD	31	(0)
2004–2007	SpVgg Landshut		
- * Club domestic league appearances and goals

Alexander Kutschera (born 21 March 1968) is a German former professional footballer who played as a defender for Eintracht Frankfurt, among other clubs.
