= István Pisont =

Hungarian footballer and manager

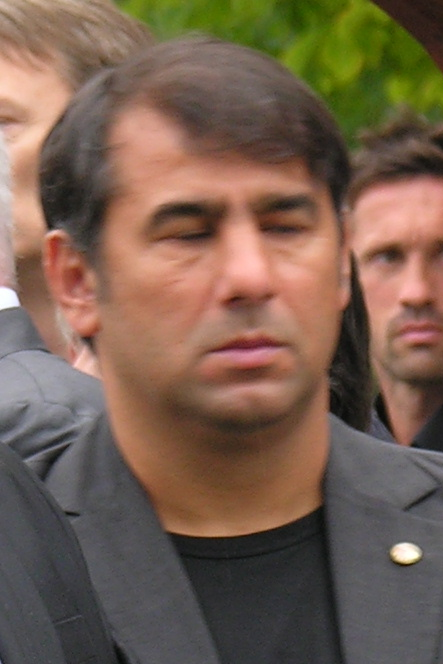

Personal information
- Full name: István Pisont
- Date of birth: 16 May 1970 (age 56)
- Place of birth: Orosháza, Hungary
- Height: 1.73 m (5 ft 8 in)
- Position: Midfielder

Team information
- Current team: Budapest Honvéd FC (Head coach)

Youth career
- Gadoros FC
- FC Szarvas

Senior career*
Years	Team	Apps	(Gls)
1988–1995	Honvéd	147	(21)
1995	Charleroi	18	(1)
1995–1998	Beitar Jerusalem	69	(26)
1998–1999	Eintracht Frankfurt	17	(0)
1999–2002	Hapoel Tel Aviv	88	(11)
2002–2003	Ashdod	7	(0)
2003	Bnei Yehuda	16	(1)
2003–2004	MTK Hungaria FC	21	(2)
2004–2005	Vecses FC	??	(?)
2005–2008	Vecses FC	40	(2)

International career
1991–1999	Hungary	31	(1)

Managerial career
- 2020–2021: Budapest Honvéd
- 2021–present: Hungary u17
- 2022: Budapest Honvéd
- * Club domestic league appearances and goals

István Pisont (born 16 May 1970) is a Hungarian former international footballer, and manager. He is currently the coach of the Hungarian national U-17 team. He has been interim manager of Budapest Honvéd FC on two occasions.

== Career ==
Pisont started his professional career in the Hungarian League with Budapest Honvéd FC. After a few years spent with the Budapest side, he decided to move on to the Belgium League where he signed for R. Charleroi S.C. in the 1994–95 season. After spending one season in Belgium, he moved to Israel where he played for Beitar Jerusalem F.C. in the 1995–96 season.

In the 1995–96 season, Pisont decided to join the Israeli team of Beitar Jerusalem where he scored 6 goals in the first season. In the 1996–97 season, he scored 5 goals for Beitar Jerusalem and in the season 1997–98, he improved his performance by scoring 15 goals.

For the 1998–99 season he was offered a place in the Eintracht Frankfurt team.

However, after one year only, he returned to Israel where this time he played for Hapoel Tel Aviv from the 1999–2000 season to the 2001–02 season. In 2002, Pisont was a star of the Hapoel Tel Aviv team that was the first Israeli team to reach the quarter final of the UEFA Cup.

In 2003, he left Bnei Yehuda to join MTK Hungaria FC on a free transfer for one year.

His last match 21 April 2004 against DVSC.

== International career ==
Pisont gained 31 caps for Hungary between 1991 and 1999 and scored once, against Azerbaijan in 1998.

== Managerial career ==
On 19 March 2020 he was appointed as the interim manager of Budapest Honvéd FC until the end of the season. He replaced Giuseppe Sannino, won the Magyar Kupa (Hungarian Cup). He has been appointed again as interim manager at the end of the same year for nine games and stayed kept working for the club after his second spell ended as a first team manager.

== Personal life ==
Pisont is of Romani descent.

== Career honours ==
=== Player ===
Honvéd

- Hungarian League: 1991, 1993

Beitar Jerusalem

- Israeli Championship: 1996-97, 1997–98
- Toto Cup Al: 1997-98

Hapoel Tel Aviv

- Israeli Championship: 1999-2000
- Israel State Cup: 1999-2000
- Toto Cup Al: 2001-02

=== Manager ===
Honvéd

- Magyar Kupa 2019–20
