= Yang Chen (footballer, born 1974) =

Chinese footballer and coach

Yang Chen 杨晨
Personal information
- Date of birth: 17 January 1974 (age 52)
- Place of birth: Beijing, China
- Height: 1.85 m (6 ft 1 in)
- Positions: Striker; midfielder

Senior career*
Years	Team	Apps	(Gls)
1993–1997	Beijing Guoan	55	(7)
1998	→ Waldhof Mannheim (loan)	0	(0)
1998–2002	Eintracht Frankfurt	94	(21)
2002–2003	FC St. Pauli	20	(2)
2003–2005	Shenzhen Jianlibao	49	(4)
2006–2007	Xiamen Blue Lions	51	(4)

International career
1995–2004	China	35	(11)

Managerial career
- 2009–2010: Jiangsu Sainty (assistant)
- 2011–2013: Jiangsu Sainty (assistant)
- 2014: Guizhou Renhe (assistant coach)
- 2015–2018: Beijing Enterprises Group (assistant)
- 2020–2021: China U-23 (assistant)
- 2021–2023: China U-17
- 2024: Henan FC (deputy managing director)
Medal record
Men's football
Representing China
Asian Games
Bronze medal – third place	1998 Bangkok	Football
East Asian Football Championship
Bronze medal – third place	2003 Japan	Team
AFC U-16 Championship
Bronze medal – third place	1990 UAE	Team
- * Club domestic league appearances and goals

Yang Chen (simplified Chinese: 杨晨; traditional Chinese: 楊晨; pinyin: Yáng Chén; born 17 January 1974) is a Chinese football coach and a former player.

As a player he represented Beijing Guoan, Waldhof Mannheim, Eintracht Frankfurt, FC St. Pauli, Shenzhen Jianlibao and Xiamen Blue Lions. He is the first Chinese player to play and score in the Bundesliga while internationally he played for the China football team in the 2002 FIFA World Cup.

== Club career ==
Born in Beijing, Yang began his professional football career with Beijing Guoan. He gradually established himself within their team during his time with them, however it was only once he had a short loan period with lower league German Waldhof Mannheim in 1998 did he show his potential as a forward. This saw Bundesliga side Eintracht Frankfurt interested in him and were willing to make a transfer of DEM1 million for his services. Being the first Chinese footballer to play in the Bundesliga he would personally thrive within the league and score eight goals to help the team avoid relegation to 2. Bundesliga. Yang Chen would go on to be viewed as a trailblazer for Chinese footballers for his ability to score in one of the five major European football leagues and would personally go on to win the Chinese Footballer of the Year in 2000. While his time with Frankfurt was viewed as a success when new manager Felix Magath came in during the 2000–01 season Yang Chen did lose favour within the team and would have to fight back for his position before deciding to move to 2. Bundesliga team FC St. Pauli to ensure his place within the Chinese football team in preparation for the FIFA World Cup.

Yang Chen went back to his home country to play for Shenzhen Jianlibao where under the manager Zhu Guanghu his career would thrive once more and he would go on to win the 2004 Chinese Super League title. Once Zhu Guanghu left to take over the Chinese national team and Chi Shangbin came in to replace him Yang Chen and several other players immediately took a disliking to him. Throughout the 2005 league season there were numerous accusations between the management and the players. The club would decide to let the management go and several players including Yang Chen were sold off. He would go on to join Xiamen Blue Lions until they disbanded in 2007 and he decided to retire.

== International career ==
Yang Chen also played for China at the 2002 FIFA World Cup. He is the Chinese player to have come closest to scoring in the World Cup when his volley ricocheted off the post in the 3–0 loss to Turkey in group stage.

== Managerial career ==
In 2009, Yang obtained his coaching certificate and joined top-tier club Jiangsu Sainty as an assistant coach. In 2010 he would leave the club to go back to Germany to study and complete his international A-level coaching badges before returning to Jiangsu Sainty as an assistant coach and team leader under Dragan Okuka.

In December 2013, Yang joined Guizhou Renhe as an assistant coach and team leader, however he decided to leave them in January 2015 when he accepted the invitation of returning to his hometown of Beijing to join Beijing Enterprises Group to become their guidetrainer and an assistant coach.

In April 2021, Yang was named as head coach of China U-16.

== Career statistics ==
Scores and results list China's goal tally first, score column indicates score after each Chen goal.

List of international goals scored by Yang Chen
No.	Date	Venue	Opponent	Score	Result	Competition
1	2 December 1998	Bangkok, Thailand	Cambodia	1–0	4–1	1998 Asian Games
2	2 December 1998	Bangkok, Thailand	Cambodia	3–0	4–1	1998 Asian Games
3	2 December 1998	Bangkok, Thailand	Cambodia	4–0	4–1	1998 Asian Games
4	10 December 1998	Bangkok, Thailand	Oman	6–1	6–1	1998 Asian Games
5	7 October 2000	Amman, Jordan	Jordan	1–0	1–1	Friendly
6	16 October 2000	Tripoli, Lebanon	Indonesia	3–0	4–0	2000 AFC Asian Cup
7	23 October 2000	Beirut, Lebanon	Qatar	3–0	3–1	2000 AFC Asian Cup
8	26 October 2000	Beirut, Lebanon	Japan	2–1	2–3	2000 AFC Asian Cup
9	22 April 2001	Xi'an, China	Maldives	7–0	10–1	2002 FIFA World Cup qualifier
10	13 May 2001	Kunming, China	Indonesia	2–1	5–1	2002 FIFA World Cup qualifier
11	10 December 2003	Kanagawa, Japan	Hong Kong	3–0	3–1	2003 EAFF East Asian Cup

== Honours ==
Shenzhen Jianlibao

- Chinese Super League: 2004

== Filmography ==
=== Variety shows ===
Year	Name	Notes
2016	Running Man	episode – 283
