= Tore Pedersen =

Norwegian footballer (born 1969)

Personal information
- Full name: Tore André Pedersen
- Date of birth: 29 September 1969 (age 57)
- Place of birth: Fredrikstad, Norway
- Height: 1.85 m (6 ft 1 in)
- Position: Defender

Senior career*
Years	Team	Apps	(Gls)
1987	Selbak IF		
1988	Lillestrøm SK	0	(0)
1989	Fredrikstad FK		
1990–1992	IFK Göteborg	60	(0)
1993	SK Brann	22	(0)
1993–1994	Oldham Athletic	10	(0)
1994	SK Brann	1	(0)
1994–1995	Sanfrecce Hiroshima	14	(0)
1995	SK Brann	12	(0)
1995–1997	FC St. Pauli	37	(0)
1997–1998	Blackburn Rovers	5	(0)
1998–1999	Eintracht Frankfurt	20	(1)
1999–2001	Wimbledon	6	(0)
2001	Trosvik IF		
2002–2003	Fredrikstad FK	38	(3)

International career
1990–1999	Norway	45	(0)
- * Club domestic league appearances and goals

Tore Pedersen (born 29 September 1969) is a Norwegian retired professional footballer who played as a defender. He spent time abroad for Wimbledon, St. Pauli, Oldham Athletic, IFK Göteborg, Sanfrecce Hiroshima, Eintracht Frankfurt and Blackburn Rovers. He made 45 appearances for the Norway national team.

== Career statistics ==
=== Club ===
Appearances and goals by club, season and competition
Club	Season	League		
Club	Season	Division	Apps	Goals
Selbak	1987			
Lillestrøm	1988	First Division	0	0
Fredrikstad	1989			
Göteborg	1990	Allsvenskan	14	0
Göteborg	1991	Allsvenskan	25	0
Göteborg	1992	Allsvenskan	21	0
Göteborg	Total		60	0
Brann	1993	Tippeligaen	22	0
Oldham Athletic	1993–94	Premier League	10	0
Brann	1994	Tippeligaen	1	0
Sanfrecce Hiroshima	1994	J1 League	14	0
Sanfrecce Hiroshima	1995	J1 League	0	0
Sanfrecce Hiroshima	Total		14	0
Brann	1995	Tippeligaen	12	0
FC St. Pauli	1995–96	Bundesliga	12	0
FC St. Pauli	1996–97	Bundesliga	25	0
FC St. Pauli	Total		37	0
Blackburn Rovers	1997–98	Premier League	5	0
Eintracht Frankfurt	1998–99	Bundesliga	20	1
Wimbledon	1999–2000	Premier League	6	0
Wimbledon	2000–01	First Division	0	0
Wimbledon	Total		6	0
Trosvik	2001			
Fredrikstad	2002		24	3
Fredrikstad	2003		14	0
Fredrikstad	Total		38	3
Selbak	2004			
Selbak	2005			
Career total			222	4

=== International ===
Appearances and goals by national team and year
National team	Year	Apps	Goals
Norway	1990	5	0
Norway	1991	8	0
Norway	1992	10	0
Norway	1993	10	0
Norway	1994	5	0
Norway	1995	1	0
Norway	1996	1	0
Norway	1997	4	0
Norway	1998	0	0
Norway	1999	3	0
Total		47	0
