= Stefan Zinnow =

German footballer

Personal information
- Date of birth: 28 May 1980 (age 46)
- Place of birth: Weinheim, West Germany
- Height: 1.80 m (5 ft 11 in)
- Position: Midfielder

Youth career
- FV 09 Weinheim
- Waldhof Mannheim

Senior career*
Years	Team	Apps	(Gls)
1998–2001	Eintracht Frankfurt	3	(0)
2001–2003	Waldhof Mannheim	43	(3)
2003–2004	VfB Lübeck	21	(0)
2004–2006	SV Wehen	61	(8)
2006–2008	SV Elversberg	65	(12)
2008–2010	Kickers Offenbach	71	(16)
2010–2011	SV Sandhausen	12	(2)
Total		276	(41)

International career
1999–2000	Germany U-21	5	(1)
- * Club domestic league appearances and goals

Stefan Zinnow (born 28 May 1980) is a German former professional footballer who played as a midfielder.

== Career ==
Zinnow was born in Weinheim. He made his professional debut in the Bundesliga for Eintracht Frankfurt in a match against VfL Bochum on 4 April 1999 when he came on as a substitute in the 9th minute. He was substituted in the 65th minute.
