= Alexander Schur =

German footballer

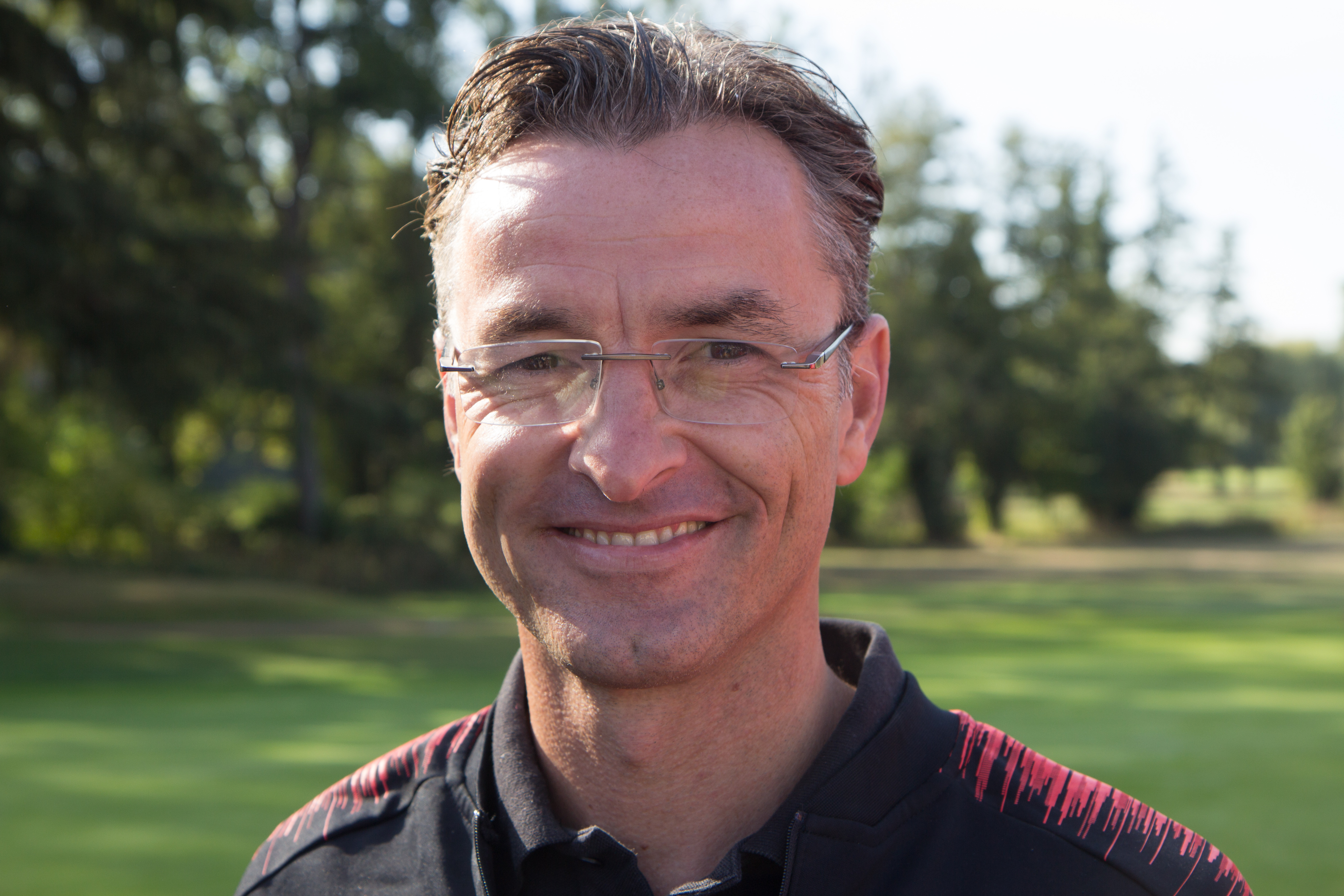
- Alexander Schur in 2018

Personal information
- Full name: Alexander Schur
- Date of birth: 23 July 1971 (age 55)
- Place of birth: Frankfurt, West Germany
- Height: 1.76 m (5 ft 9 1/2 in)
- Position: Midfielder

Youth career
- 1977–1988: VfR Bockenheim

Senior career*
Years	Team	Apps	(Gls)
1988–1994	Rot-Weiß Frankfurt	237	(33)
1994–1995	FSV Frankfurt		
1995–2006	Eintracht Frankfurt	251	(23)
2006–2007	Sportfreunde Seligenstadt		
- * Club domestic league appearances and goals

Alexander Schur (born 23 July 1971) is a former German footballer. Schur played for more than ten years for Eintracht Frankfurt and is a legend for the Eintracht supporters due to his fighting spirit and his club loyalty.

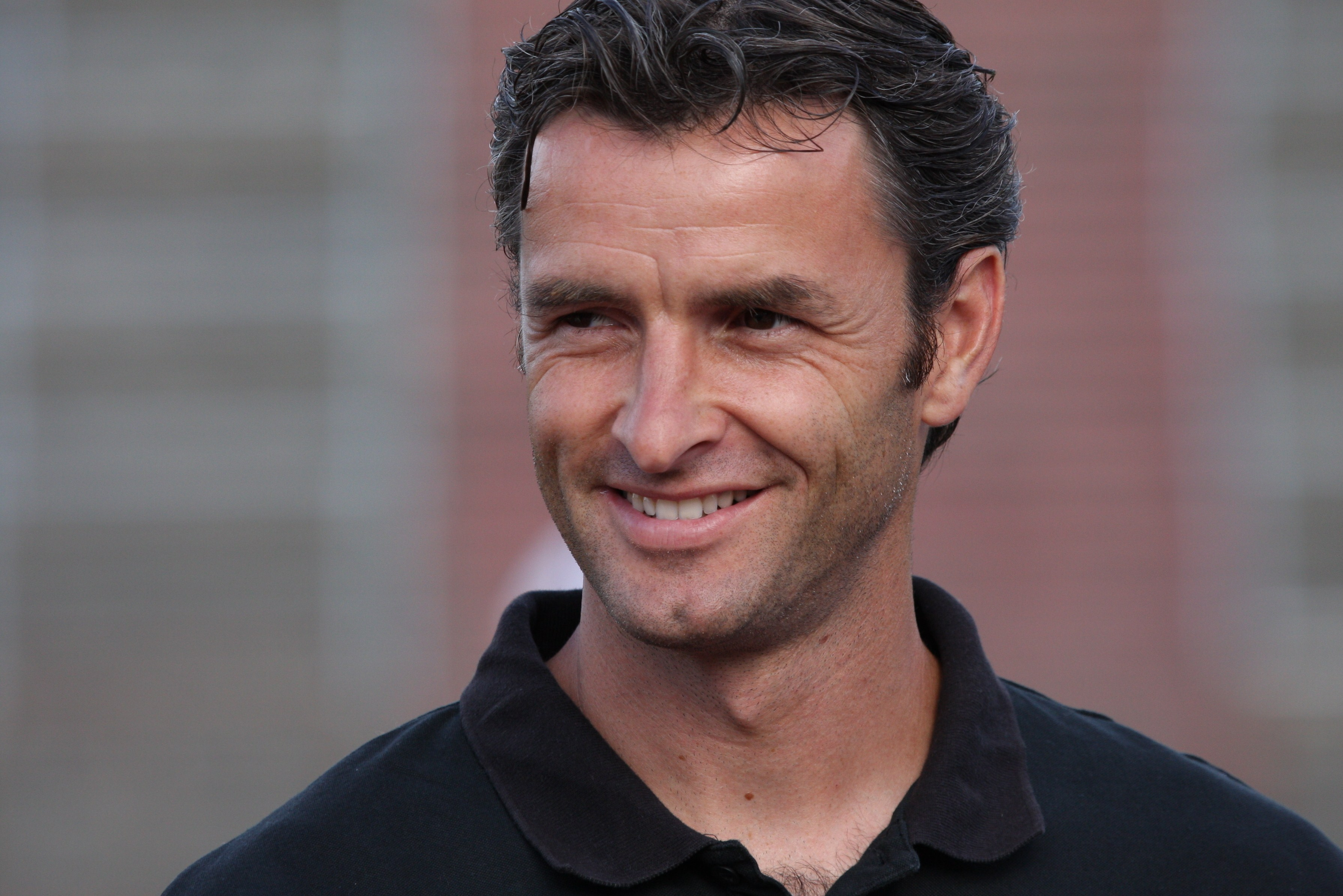
Alexander Schur in 2008

Arguably his most important goal was the header for the 6–3 against SSV Reutlingen in the 2002–03 season of the Second Bundesliga that assured the promotion of the eagles.

On 22 May 2004 he an Eintracht supporters club, named itself after him, the EFC oldSCHURhand.

After retiring Schur started the 2007–08 season as assistant manager of the Eintracht Frankfurt Under-19 team. In December 2007 he was appointed assistant manager of the reserve squad, Eintracht Frankfurt U23. After the 2008–09 campaign he was appointed under-17 manager of the Eintracht academy.

== Honours ==
=== Club ===
Rot-Weiß Frankfurt

- Hessenliga: 1989–90; runner-up 1990–91
- Hesse Cup: 1988–89, 1991–92; runner-up 1993–94

Eintracht Frankfurt

- 2. Bundesliga: 1997–98
- DFB-Pokal: Runner-up 2005–06
