= Sascha Amstätter =

German footballer

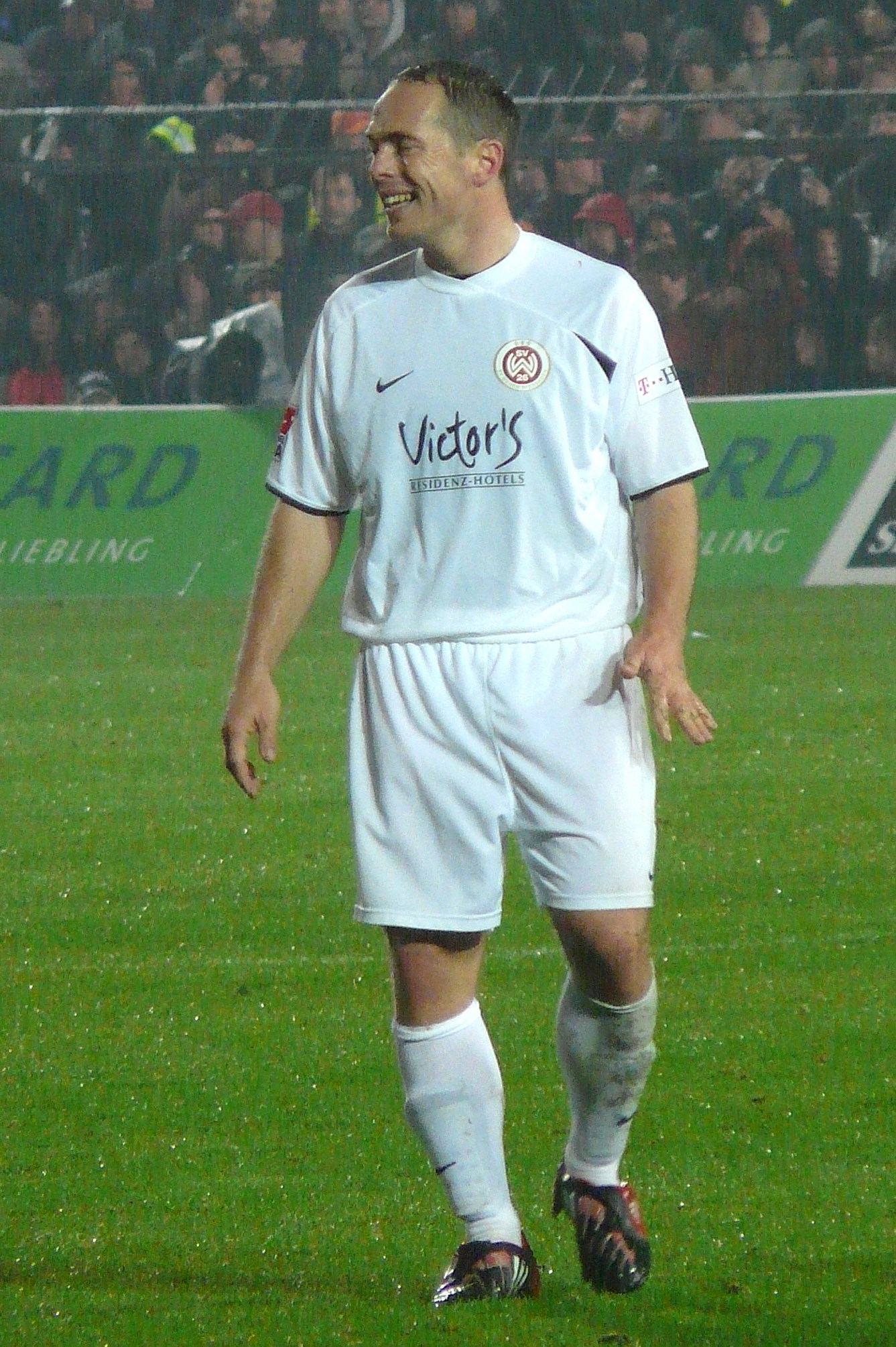
- Sascha Amstätter in 2008

Personal information
- Date of birth: 8 November 1977 (age 48)
- Place of birth: Frankfurt am Main, West Germany
- Height: 1.70 m (5 ft 7 in)
- Position: Midfielder

Team information
- Current team: SV Zeilsheim II
- Number: 26

Youth career
- Kickers Offenbach
- SV Viktoria Preußen 07
- Germania Ginnheim

Senior career*
Years	Team	Apps	(Gls)
1996–1997	FSV Frankfurt	29	(2)
1997–1999	Eintracht Frankfurt	5	(0)
1999–2000	KFC Uerdingen 05	12	(1)
2000–2001	Wehen Wiesbaden	38	(4)
2001	SV Darmstadt 98	8	(0)
2002–2010	Wehen Wiesbaden	188	(19)
2010–2012	SV Darmstadt 98	47	(0)
2012–2015	SV Wiesbaden	65	(10)
2018–	SV Zeilsheim II	3	(0)

Managerial career
- 2012–2013: SV Wiesbaden (player-coach)
- 2015: SV Wiesbaden (assistant)
- 2016–: SV Zeilsheim
- * Club domestic league appearances and goals as of 2 February 2021

Sascha Amstätter (born 8 November 1977 in Frankfurt am Main) is a German footballer who plays for SV Zeilsheim II.

== Career ==
He made his debut at the professional league level in the 2. Bundesliga for Eintracht Frankfurt on 25 July 1997 when he came on as a substitute in the 68th minute in a game against Fortuna Düsseldorf.
