= Thomas Reichenberger =

German footballer

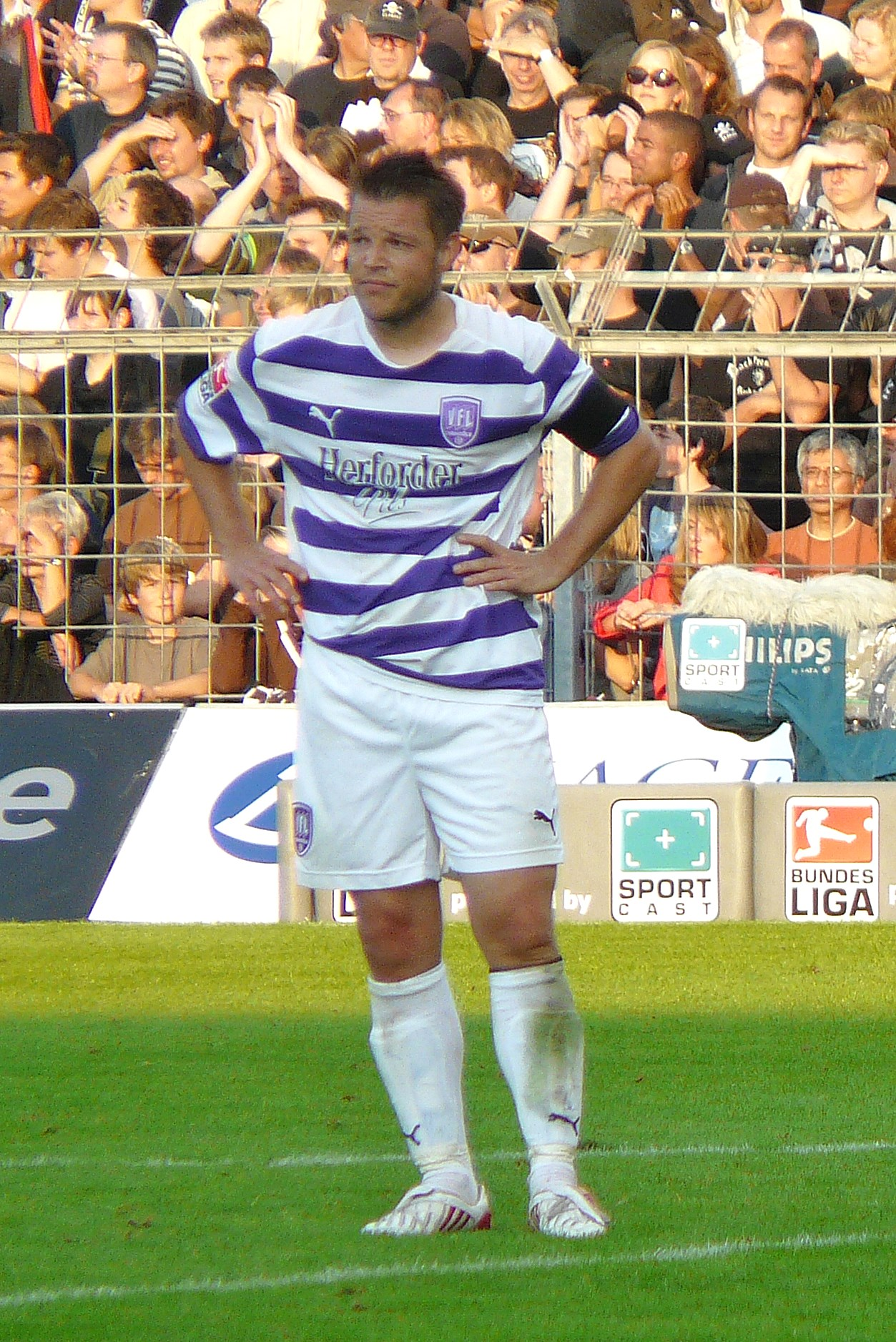
- Reichenberger in 2008

Personal information
- Date of birth: 14 October 1974 (age 52)
- Place of birth: Bad Kreuznach, West Germany
- Height: 1.74 m (5 ft 9 in)
- Position: Striker

Youth career
- 1979–1994: Eintracht Bad Kreuznach
- 1994–1995: Hassia Bingen

Senior career*
Years	Team	Apps	(Gls)
1995–1997	SV Wehen	66	(41)
1997–1998	Bayer Leverkusen II	30	(20)
1998–1999	Bayer Leverkusen	24	(4)
1999–2001	Eintracht Frankfurt	46	(7)
2001–2003	Energie Cottbus	21	(1)
2003–2004	Uerdingen 05	27	(8)
2004–2010	VfL Osnabrück	184	(78)
Total		398	(159)

International career
1999–2000	Germany B	5	(1)
- * Club domestic league appearances and goals

Thomas Reichenberger (born 14 October 1974) is a German former professional footballer who played as a striker.

== Honours ==
- Bundesliga runner-up: 1998–99, 1999–2000
