= Marco Gebhardt =

German footballer

Personal information
- Date of birth: 7 October 1972 (age 54)
- Place of birth: Quedlinburg, East Germany
- Height: 1.79 m (5 ft 10 in)
- Position: Midfielder

Team information
- Current team: Blau-Weiß 90 Berlin (manager)

Youth career
- 1980–1982: Einheit Ballenstedt
- 1982–1985: Motor Quedlinburg
- 1985–1986: Stahl Thale
- 1986–1991: Hallescher FC

Senior career*
Years	Team	Apps	(Gls)
1991–1992	Hallescher FC	0	(0)
1992–1994	FC Anhalt Dessau	60	(20)
1994–1995	Lok Stendal	29	(4)
1995–1997	SC Verl	48	(8)
1997–2002	Eintracht Frankfurt	109	(10)
2002–2004	Energie Cottbus	45	(6)
2004–2006	1860 Munich	44	(5)
2006–2007	1. FC Saarbrücken	29	(1)
2007–2010	Union Berlin	96	(9)
2010–2011	Germania Schöneiche	25	(8)

International career
	Germany B	3	(0)

Managerial career
- 2011: Türkiyemspor Berlin
- 2012–2013: Grün-Weiß Lübben
- 2013–2014: Dynamo Dresden U17
- 2013: Dynamo Dresden U19 (caretaker)
- 2014–2015: Dynamo Dresden (assistant)
- 2015–: Blau-Weiß 90 Berlin
- * Club domestic league appearances and goals

Marco Gebhardt (born 7 October 1972) is a German football manager and former player. He is currently manager of NOFV-Oberliga Nord club Blau-Weiß 90 Berlin.
