= Uwe Schneider =

German footballer

Personal information
- Date of birth: 28 August 1971 (age 55)
- Place of birth: Germany
- Height: 1.77 m (5 ft 10 in)
- Position: Defender

Youth career
- Eintracht Frankfurt
- 1. FC Nürnberg
- VfB Stuttgart

Senior career*
Years	Team	Apps	(Gls)
1990–1994	VfB Stuttgart	72	(0)
1994–1995	VfL Bochum	11	(0)
1996	Hannover 96	12	(0)
1996–1998	1. FC Nürnberg	20	(0)
1998–2000	Eintracht Frankfurt	16	(0)
2000–2003	VfR Aalen	42	(2)
2003	Zagłębie Lubin		
2004–2005	Borussia Fulda		

International career
1991–1992	Germany U-21	7	(0)
- * Club domestic league appearances and goals

Uwe Schneider (born 28 August 1971) is a German former footballer. Since 2008 he works as an athletic director for FC 08 Villingen.

== Honours ==
VfB Stuttgart

- Bundesliga: 1991–92
