= Damir Stojak =

Serbian footballer (born 1975)

Personal information
- Full name: Damir Stojak
- Date of birth: 22 May 1975 (age 51)
- Place of birth: Novi Sad, SR Serbia, SFR Yugoslavia
- Height: 1.83 m (6 ft 0 in)
- Position: Striker

Youth career
- Vojvodina

Senior career*
Years	Team	Apps	(Gls)
1992–1997	Vojvodina	67	(32)
1992–1993	→ Kabel (loan)		
1994–1995	→ Bečej (loan)	34	(6)
1998–2001	Napoli	14	(2)
1998–1999	→ Eintracht Frankfurt (loan)	9	(1)
2001–2002	Eendracht Aalst	32	(11)
2002–2003	Visé		
Total		156+	(52+)

International career
1996–1997	FR Yugoslavia U21	3	(1)
- * Club domestic league appearances and goals

Damir Stojak (Serbian Cyrillic: Дамир Стојак; born 22 May 1975) is a Serbian former professional footballer who played as a striker.

== Club career ==
After his promising performances at Vojvodina, Stojak moved abroad and signed with Italian side Napoli in early 1998. He made 13 appearances and scored twice in the remainder of the 1997–98 Serie A, as the club finished bottom of the table.

== International career ==
Stojak was capped for FR Yugoslavia at the under-21 level.

== Career statistics ==
Club	Season	League	
Club	Season	Apps	Goals
Vojvodina	1992–93	1	0
Vojvodina	1993–94	12	4
Vojvodina	1994–95	0	0
Vojvodina	1995–96	12	4
Vojvodina	1996–97	31	16
Vojvodina	1997–98	11	8
Vojvodina	Total	67	32
Bečej (loan)	1994–95	24	5
Bečej (loan)	1995–96	10	1
Bečej (loan)	Total	34	6
Total		101	38
