= Mourad Bounoua =

Footballer (born 1972)

Personal information
- Date of birth: 30 July 1972 (age 54)
- Place of birth: Mulhouse, France
- Height: 1.80 m (5 ft 11 in)
- Position: Midfielder

Senior career*
| Years | Team | Apps | (Gls) |
| 1991–1992 | Mulhouse | | |
| 1992–1994 | FC Basel | 0 | (0) |
| 1994–1995 | Tus Hoisdorf | 24 | (3) |
| 1995–1997 | TuS Celle FC | 58 | (13) |
| 1997–1998 | Stuttgarter Kickers | 41 | (3) |
| 1998–1999 | Eintracht Frankfurt | 7 | (0) |
| 1999–2002 | Hannover 96 | 64 | (7) |
| 2002–2005 | FC St. Pauli | 61 | (15) |
| 2005–2006 | Brinkumer SV | | |
| 2006–2007 | FC Oberneuland | | |
| 2007 | Goslarer SC 08 | | |
| 2008 | SV Ramlingen/Ehlershausen | | |
| 2008 | Germania Walsrode | | |
| 2009 | Rotenburger SV | | |
| 2010 | MTV Soltau | | |
| 2010 | Germania Walsrode | | |
| 2011–2012 | Rotenburger SV | | |

International career
| 1998 | Morocco | 1 | (0) |
- * Club domestic league appearances and goals

Mourad Bounoua (born 30 July 1972) is a former professional footballer who played as a midfielder during the 1990s and 2000s. He spent most of his career in Germany. Born in France, he made one appearance for the Morocco national team in 1998.

== Career ==
Born in Mulhouse, Bounoua began playing professionally with his local team FC Mulhouse in 1991 but did not quite make the grade and was sold to Swiss Second Division team FC Basel in 1992. During his two years in Basel he did not play a single league match but made five appearances for the team in the Swiss Cup. In 1994, he moved to Germany with Tus Hoisdorf. He then signed for TuS Celle FC in 1995, where he played for two years before joining Stuttgarter Kickers. He achieved some excellent form in Stuttgart and was called up to the Morocco national team. Eintracht Frankfurt signed him in 1998, but he struggled there, playing just seven games, and moved on to Hannover 96 a year later. Bounoua signed for FC St. Pauli in 2002 and spent the rest of his career in the German lower divisions with multiple clubs in Northern Germany, before retiring in the summer of 2012.
