= Michael Mutzel =

German footballer

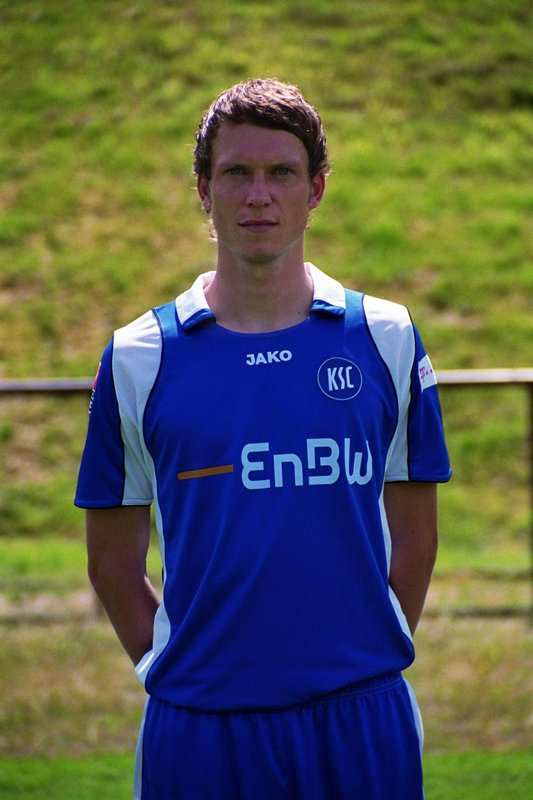
- Mutzel in 2007 with Karlsruher SC

Personal information
- Date of birth: 27 September 1979 (age 47)
- Place of birth: Memmingen, West Germany
- Height: 1.83 m (6 ft 0 in)
- Position: Midfielder

Youth career
- SV Greimertshofen
- TSG Thannhausen
- FC Memmingen

Senior career*
Years	Team	Apps	(Gls)
1997–1998	FC Augsburg	0	(0)
1998–2002	Eintracht Frankfurt	34	(1)
2002–2004	VfB Stuttgart	16	(0)
2004	VfB Stuttgart II	1	(0)
2004–2011	Karlsruher SC	134	(4)
2012	VfL Wolfsburg II	0	(0)

Managerial career
- 2012: 1899 Hoffenheim (U17 assistant)
- 2013: 1899 Hoffenheim (U16)
- * Club domestic league appearances and goals

Michael Mutzel (born 27 September 1979) is a German former professional footballer who played as a midfielder. His most recent job was as sporting director of Hamburger SV until July 2022.

He represented Germany at the 1999 FIFA World Youth Championship.

== After retirement ==
After retiring at the end of the 2011–12 season, Mutzel began his coaching career at 1899 Hoffenheim as assistant manager of the U17 team. He was appointed in a dual function, where he also was involved in the scouting and squad planning for the U15, U16 and U17. From 1 January 2013, he took over the U16s. In April 2013, he was also appointed as head of the youth department and became responsible for the sporty coordination of the U16 to U19 teams. He left the club on 28 October 2014 to join Greuther Fürth as a sporting director. He was at Greuther Fürth until the end of 2015.

On 2 February 2016, Mutzel returned to Hoffenheim and became responsible of scouting and game analysis. He was going to be the head of scouting and responsible for the game analysis. He left the club again at the end of March 2019 to join Hamburger SV as sporting director. He was released by Hamburg on 13 July 2022 after heavy criticism by Jonas Boldt.

== Honours ==
VfB Stuttgart

- UEFA Intertoto Cup: 2002
