= Donald Agu =

Nigerian footballer (born 1975)

Personal information
- Date of birth: 12 December 1975 (age 50)
- Place of birth: Nigeria
- Height: 1.85 m (6 ft 1 in)
- Position: Defender

Senior career*
Years	Team	Apps	(Gls)
1992–1994	Enugu Rangers		
1994–1995	FK Obilić		
1995–1996	Salernitana		
1996–1998	FC Augsburg	37	(2)
1998–2000	Eintracht Frankfurt	0	(0)
2000–2002	SSV Reutlingen	35	(0)
2002–2005	Abahani Limited		
2005–2007	Enugu Rangers		
- * Club domestic league appearances and goals

Donald Agu (born 12 December 1975) is a Nigerian former football player.

== Career ==
He started his career in Enugu Rangers, and in 1994, came to play to Europe. First he played for FK Obilić in the First League of FR Yugoslavia one season, before moving to Italy to play for Salernitana Calcio. Then he moved to Germany and played with FC Augsburg. Next, he joined the Bundesliga side Eintracht Frankfurt but failed to play a league match. Between 2000 and 2002, Agu played for SSV Reutlingen in the 2. Bundesliga. In January 2002, Agu moved to Bangladesh and played in Abahani Limited, before returning to Nigeria where he ended his career playing again for Enugu Rovers.
