= Frank Gerster =

German footballer (born 1976)

Personal information
- Date of birth: 15 April 1976 (age 50)
- Place of birth: Kempten, West Germany
- Height: 1.85 m (6 ft 1 in)
- Position: Midfielder

Team information
- Current team: FC Neu-Anspach (Manager)

Youth career
- FC Kempten
- –1994: FC Augsburg

Senior career*
Years	Team	Apps	(Gls)
1994–1998	Bayern Munich (A)	108	(17)
1996–1998	Bayern Munich	8	(0)
1998–2001	Eintracht Frankfurt	1	(0)
2001–2002	SSV Reutlingen	34	(2)
2002–2003	Borussia Fulda	33	(8)
2004–2006	FC Sachsen Leipzig	40	(4)
2006	Kickers Emden	13	(1)
2006–2008	1. FC Magdeburg	68	(7)
2008–2009	Chemnitzer FC	4	(0)
2013–2014	TSV Vatanspor		
Total		309	(39)

International career
1994–1995	Germany U20	6	(0)
1996–1998	Germany U21	14	(2)

Managerial career
- 2010–2011: Borussia Dortmund II (assistant)
- 2013–2014: TSV Vatanspor (playing manager)
- 2015–: FC Neu-Anspach
Medal record
Bayern Munich
Winner	Bundesliga	1997
Winner	DFB Liga-Pokal	1997
Winner	DFB-Pokal	1998
- * Club domestic league appearances and goals

Frank Gerster (born 15 April 1976) is a German football manager and former player who played as a midfielder. He is the manager of FC Neu-Anspach.

== Career ==
Gerster played youth football in Bavaria, playing for his hometown club FC Kempten and later FC Augsburg, before joining Bayern Munich in 1994. He progressed through Bayern's reserve team, and was promoted to the first team in 1996, making his Bundesliga in March 1997 as a substitute for Marcel Witeczek in a 2–0 defeat to Arminia Bielefeld. He made a further eight appearances for Bayern - all as a substitute - seven came in the League and one against IFK Göteborg in the group stage of the 1997–98 UEFA Champions League. During his time at Bayern, Gerster won a League title and a Cup and also represented Germany, being named in the squad for the 1995 FIFA World Youth Championship in Qatar, and making fourteen appearances for the Germany under-21 team.

In 1998, Gerster left Bayern to sign for Eintracht Frankfurt, where he had a hugely unsuccessful three years, making only one first-team appearance, in a 4–1 defeat to 1860 Munich. After leaving Frankfurt, Gerster embarked on a journeyman career, playing for various Regionalliga clubs before retiring in 2009 after a year with Chemnitzer FC. A year later, he was appointed as assistant manager of Borussia Dortmund's reserve team, assisting David Wagner.

== Honours ==
- Bundesliga: 1996–97
- DFB-Ligapokal: 1997
- DFB-Pokal: 1997–98
