= TSG Wörsdorf =

German football club

- Full name: Turn- und Sportgemeinschaft 1887 e.V. Wörsdorf
- Founded: 1887
- Ground: Stadion Wallbacherstraße
- Capacity: 3,000
- Chairman: Ralph Duell
- Manager: Pasquale Iannelli
- League: Gruppenliga Wiesbaden (VII)
- 2018–19: Verbandsliga Hessen-Mitte (VI), 15th ↓
Home colours	Away colours

TSG Wörsdorf is a German association football club from Wörsdorf, a municipality of Idstein, Hesse.

== History ==
The club is the second oldest sports association in the district and is today the largest with a membership of nearly 1,000. In addition to a football side, TSG has departments for gymnastics and dance, table tennis, athletics, volleyball, and hiking.

The team has its origins in the gymnastics club Turnverein Wörsdorf established on 8 July 1887. A football department was formed in 1921 and became independent within a year as Sportverein 1922 Wörsdorf. The association all but disappeared after the rise to power of the Nazis in 1933 as it was assimilated by a larger community sports organization established by the regime. An independent club was re-established in 1945 and was soon reunited with its parent side with the club playing as SV. By 1950 the club was known briefly as Turn- und Sportgemeinschaft Wörsdorf/Taunus before adopting its current name.

The development of a new sports facility in 1980 helped to motivate a drive to improve the football team. Playing in the local Kreisliga in the late 80s the footballers began a steady ascent that took them to the Landesliga Hessen-Mitte (V) in 1993 and then on into the Oberliga Hessen (IV) in 2001. The club's best results were consecutive 7th-place finishes earned in 2005 and 2006. After nine seasons in the Hessenliga, the club was relegated to the Verbandsliga in 2010 and to the Gruppenliga Wiesbaden after another relegation in 2012. A league championship there in 2015 took the club back up to the Verbandsliga, from which it was relegated again in 2019.

Wörsdorf plays its home matches in the Stadion Wallbacherstraße which has a capacity of 3,000. The club colours are blue and orange.

== Honours ==
The club's honours:

- Landesliga Hessen-Mitte
  - Champions: 2001
- Gruppenliga Wiesbaden
  - Champions: 2015
