= 2001–02 Eintracht Frankfurt season =

Eintracht Frankfurt
2001-02 season
- Chairman: Steven Jedlicki
- Manager: Martin Andermatt (resigned 8 March 2002); Armin Kraaz (appointed as caretaker 8 March 2002)
- 2. Bundesliga: 7th
- DFB-Pokal: Round of 16
- Top goalscorer: League: Paweł Kryszałowicz (16); All: Paweł Kryszałowicz (16)
- Highest home attendance: 21,500 (vs Mainz 05, 21 April)
- Lowest home attendance: 6,000 (vs Rot-Weiß Oberhausen, 5 May)
- Average home league attendance: 13,912
Home colours	Away colours

The 2001–02 Eintracht Frankfurt season was the 102nd season in the club's football history. In 2001–02 the club played in the 2. Bundesliga, the second tier of German football. It was the club's 3rd season in the 2. Bundesliga after being relegated from the Bundesliga for the second time.

== Results ==
=== Friendlies ===
Win Draw Loss

20 June 2001	SG Treis / Allendorf-Lumda	0–8	Eintracht Frankfurt	Allendorf
18:30 CEST		(Report)	Yang 10'; Guié-Mien 20', 22', 52', 67'; Reichenberger 61'; Mutzel 74'; Skela 81'	Stadium: Sportplatz Allendorf-Lumda; Attendance: 1,500

26 June 2001 Rhönsprudel-Cup	SVA Bad Hersfeld	0–3	Eintracht Frankfurt	Bad Hersfeld, Germany
19:00 CEST		(Report)	Guié-Mien 8'; Kryszałowicz 40'; Mutzel 42'	Stadium: Sportplatz SV Asbach; Attendance: 1,500

28 June 2001 Rhönsprudel-Cup Final	Buchonia Flieden	0–8	Eintracht Frankfurt	Flieden, Germany
		(Report)	Kryszałowicz 9'; Guié-Mien 39', 48'; Streit 44', 60'; Reichenberger 65'; Yang 72', 79'	Stadium: Sportplatz am Weiher; Attendance: 1,000

3 July 2001	FC Luzern	0–0 (5–4 p)	Eintracht Frankfurt	Kriens, Switzerland
20:30 CEST		(Report)		Stadium: Stadion Kleinfeld; Attendance: 2,000; Referee: Nobs
	Penalties
	Rey (penalty scored); Ohrel (penalty scored); Belajić (penalty scored); Koch (penalty scored); Alex (penalty scored)		(penalty scored) Guié-Mien; (penalty scored) Skela; (penalty scored) Maljković; (penalty missed) Branco; (penalty scored) Rada

5 July 2001	SC Kriens	0–1	Eintracht Frankfurt	Kriens, Switzerland
18:15 CEST		(Report)	Guié-Mien 42'	Stadium: Stadion Kleinfeld; Attendance: 2,000

8 July 2001	SV Wehen	0–2	Eintracht Frankfurt	Taunusstein, Germany
		(Report)	Kryszałowicz 49', 74'	Stadium: Stadion am Halberg; Attendance: 2,000

10 July 2001	SG Hoechst	0–1	Eintracht Frankfurt	Frankfurt, Germany
		(Report)	Guié-Mien 7'	Stadium: Stadion am Stadtpark; Attendance: 1,500

15 July 2001 Fila Cup 1st match	Eintracht Frankfurt	3–0	Hessen Kassel	Frankfurt, Germany
	Guié-Mien; Streit; Kryszałowicz	(Report)		Stadium: Stadion am Bornheimer Hang; Attendance: 3,000

15 July 2001 Fila Cup 2nd match	Eintracht Frankfurt	3–1	Borussia Fulda	Frankfurt, Germany
	Jones; Reichenberger; Guié-Mien	(Report)	Winter	Stadium: Stadion am Bornheimer Hang; Attendance: 3,000

15 July 2001 Fila Cup 3rd match	FSV Frankfurt	1–2	Eintracht Frankfurt	Frankfurt, Germany
	König	(Report)	Jones; Wimmer	Stadium: Stadion am Bornheimer Hang; Attendance: 3,000

15 July 2001 Fila Cup final match	Borussia Fulda	0–4	Eintracht Frankfurt	Frankfurt, Germany
15:30 CEST		(Report)	Guié-Mien; Reichenberger; Kryszałowicz	Stadium: Stadion am Bornheimer Hang; Attendance: 3,000

21 July 2001	Dresdner SC	0–3	Eintracht Frankfurt	Dresden, Germany
		(Report)	Yang 19', 44'; Guié-Mien 21'	Stadium: Heinz-Steyer-Stadion; Attendance: 1,000

30 August 2001	FC Dossenheim / SV Schriesheim XI	1–12	Eintracht Frankfurt	Schriesheim, Germany
	Schmidt 80' (pen.)	(Report)	Jones 6', 11', 18'; Wimmer 14'; Streit 22', 28'; Reichenberger 31'; Maljković 35'; Gemiti 43'; Ćirić 54', 63', 83'	Attendance: 500

4 September 2001	Rot-Weiss Frankfurt	0–4	Eintracht Frankfurt	Frankfurt, Germany
		(Report)	Reichenberger 5'; Streit 7'; Guié-Mien 8'; Jones 56'	Stadium: Stadion am Brentanobad; Attendance: 1,500

20 September 2001	FC Oberstetten / Eintracht Oberursel	0–15	Eintracht Frankfurt	Oberursel
		(Report)	Reichenberger; Guié-Mien; Jones; Wenczel	Stadium: Sportplatz Oberstedten; Attendance: 1,500

5 October 2001	Hamburger SV	3–0	Eintracht Frankfurt	Barsinghausen, Germany
	Präger 56'; Antar 74'; Heinz 83'	(Report)		Stadium: Sportschule Barsinghausen; Attendance: 1,500

13 November 2001	Bayer Leverkusen	4–0	Eintracht Frankfurt	Leverkusen, Germany
	Brdarić 8', 27', 88'; Babić 37'	(Report)		Stadium: Auxiliary pitch of BayArena; Attendance: 500

12 January 2002	SV Bernbach	0–10	Eintracht Frankfurt
		(Report)	Kryszałowicz 12'; Skela 16', 32'; Ćirić 44'; Jones 55', 90'; Németh 62'; Guié-Mien 67', 88'; Rada 84'	Attendance: 500

16 January 2002	SV Meppen	0–9	Eintracht Frankfurt
		(Report)	Ćirić 14', 36', 43'; Kryszałowicz 19', 39'; Adams 51' (o.g.); Yang 55'; Skela 72'; Famewo 87'	Attendance: 500

19 January 2002	Werder Bremen	2–2	Eintracht Frankfurt	Brinkum, Germany
	Ernst 4'; Lisztes 41'	(Report)	Skela 52'; Kryszałowicz	Attendance: 1,000

13 February 2002	Rot-Weiss Frankfurt	0–5	Eintracht Frankfurt	Frankfurt, Germany
15:30 CEST		(Report)	Famewo 29', 85'; Skela 39' (pen.); Mutzel 42', 68'	Stadium: Artificial pitch near Stadion am Brentanobad; Attendance: 250

27 March 2002	SG Dornheim	0–7	Eintracht Frankfurt	Groß-Gerau, Germany
15:30 CEST		(Report)	Wenczel 12'; Hengemühle 37', 57'; Yang 52', 70'; Famewo 80'; Skela 87'	Stadium: Riedsportfeld; Attendance: 1,000

3 April 2002	Hanau XI	1–10	Eintracht Frankfurt	Hanau, Germany
	Stefan Trageser 32'	(Report)	Ćirić 17', 65', 90'; Skela 21' (pen.); Örtülü 22'; Hengemühle 61', 74', 78'; Németh 75'; Speranza 85'	Stadium: Sportanlage an der Pumpstation; Attendance: 500

23 April 2002	SG Bruchköbel	0–11	Eintracht Frankfurt	Bruchköbel, Germany
		(Report)	Yang; Guié-Mien; Jones; Wiedener; Wenczel; Nikolov	Stadium: Sportplatz am Wald; Attendance: 500

7 May 2002	Rödelheimer FC	1–8	Eintracht Frankfurt	Frankfurt, Germany
18:30 CEST	Goal	(Report)	Ćirić (4); Andreas MengerMenger (2); Guié-Mien; Wimmer	Stadium: Sportanlage an der Westerbach; Attendance: 800

14 May 2002	Viktoria Nidda	0–13	Eintracht Frankfurt	Nidda, Germany
		(Report)	Guié-Mien 21', 24'; Wimmer 26'; Ćirić 53', 67', 75', 83', 85'; Skela 55', 87'; Speranza 63'; Németh 65', 89'	Stadium: Sportgelände an der Gymnasiumstraße; Attendance: 400

20 May 2002 Torneo “Unión Europea-Sevilla 2012“	Eintracht Frankfurt	1–1 (3–4 p)	FC Copenhagen	Seville, Spain
15:30 CEST	Jones 13'	(Report)	Møller 87' (pen.)	Stadium: Estadio Manuel Ruiz de Lopera; Attendance: 500
	Penalties
	Preuß (penalty scored); Jones (penalty scored); Speranza (penalty missed); Németh (penalty scored); Rada (penalty missed)		Penalty scored Penalty missed

=== Indoor soccer tournaments ===
==== Riesa ====
6 January 2002 First match	Eintracht Frankfurt	1–3	Widzew Łódź	Riesa, Germany
	Famewo	(Report)	Goal	Stadium: SachsenArena; Attendance: 5,200

6 January 2002 Second match	Energie Cottbus	1–1	Eintracht Frankfurt	Riesa, Germany
	Schröter	(Report)	Streit	Stadium: SachsenArena; Attendance: 5,200

==== Münster ====
8 January 2002 First match	Münster XI	3–3 (0–1 p)	Eintracht Frankfurt	Münster, Germany
	Goal	(Report)	Kryszałowicz; Famewo

8 January 2002 Second match	SV Meppen	1–3	Eintracht Frankfurt	Münster, Germany
	Goal	(Report)	Schur; Kryszałowicz; Gemiti

8 January 2002 Semi-final match	LR Ahlen	1–3	Eintracht Frankfurt	Münster, Germany
	Goal	(Report)	Schur; Famewo; Gemiti

6 January 2002 Final match	Münster XI	0–1	Eintracht Frankfurt	Münster, Germany
		(Report)	Wenczel

=== Competitions ===
Win Draw Loss

==== 2. Bundesliga ====
===== League table =====
Pos	Team	Pld	W	D	L	GF	GA	GD	Pts
5	SpVgg Greuther Fürth	34	16	11	7	62	41	+21	59
6	Union Berlin	34	16	8	10	61	41	+20	56
7	Eintracht Frankfurt	34	14	12	8	52	44	+8	54
8	LR Ahlen	34	14	6	14	60	70	−10	48
9	Waldhof Mannheim	34	12	9	13	42	48	−6	45

Source: Bundesliga.de
Rules for classification: 1) points; 2) goal difference; 3) number of goals scored.

===== Results summary =====
Overall								Home						Away					
Pld	W	D	L	GF	GA	GD	Pts	W	D	L	GF	GA	GD	W	D	L	GF	GA	GD
34	14	12	8	52	44	+8	54	6	8	3	28	24	+4	8	4	5	24	20	+4

Source: Competitive matches

===== Results by round =====
Round	1	2	3	4	5	6	7	8	9	10	11	12	13	14	15	16	17	18	19	20	21	22	23	24	25	26	27	28	29	30	31	32	33	34
Ground	H	A	H	A	H	H	A	H	A	H	A	H	A	H	A	H	A	A	H	A	H	H	A	H	A	H	A	H	A	H	A	H	A	H
Result	W	D	W	W	W	L	D	L	W	D	W	W	D	D	L	L	W	L	D	W	D	W	L	W	D	D	L	W	L	D	W	D	W	D
Position	2	7	2	1	1	2	6	7	6	5	4	4	4	4	4	5	4	5	6	5	6	5	6	6	7	7	7	7	7	7	7	7	7	7

Source: kicker.de
A = Away; H = Home; W = Win; D = Draw; L = Loss

===== Matches =====
28 July 2001 1	Eintracht Frankfurt	3–1	SSV Reutlingen	Frankfurt, Germany
15:00 CEST	Yang 63'; Kryszałowicz 67', 81'	(Report)	Weigl 16'	Stadium: Waldstadion; Attendance: 17,000; Referee: Fandel

6 August 2001 2	Waldhof Mannheim	0–0	Eintracht Frankfurt	Mannheim, Germany
20:15 CEST		(Report)		Stadium: Carl-Benz-Stadion; Attendance: 17,000; Referee: Steinborn

12 August 2001 3	Eintracht Frankfurt	2–0	1. FC Schweinfurt 05	Frankfurt, Germany
15:00 CEST	Preuß 62'; Skela 81'	(Report)		Stadium: Waldstadion; Attendance: 19,000; Referee: Stachowiak

18 August 2001 4	1. FC Saarbrücken	0–2	Eintracht Frankfurt	Saarbrücken, Germany
15:00 CEST		(Report)	Kryszałowicz 19'; Guié-Mien 88'	Stadium: Ludwigsparkstadion; Attendance: 14,000; Referee: Weber

10 September 2001 5	Karlsruher SC	2–3	Eintracht Frankfurt	Karlsruhe, Germany
20:15 CEST	Rada 30' (o.g.); Grimm 76'	(Report)	Kryszałowicz 24'; Skela 42', 59'	Stadium: Wildparkstadion; Attendance: 16,000; Referee: Fleischer

17 September 2001 6	Eintracht Frankfurt	0–2	Arminia Bielefeld	Frankfurt, Germany
20:15 CEST		(Report)	Reinhardt 47', 73'	Stadium: Waldstadion; Attendance: 13,000; Referee: Brych

24 September 2001 7	MSV Duisburg	1–1	Eintracht Frankfurt	Duisburg, Germany
20:15 CEST	Drsek 50'	(Report)	Yang 13'; Jones (yellow card) 15' (yellow-red card)	Stadium: Wedaustadion; Attendance: 7,000; Referee: Weiner

30 September 2001 8	Eintracht Frankfurt	1–4	SpVgg Greuther Fürth	Frankfurt, Germany
15:00 CEST	Kryszałowicz 66'; Rada (yellow card) 87' (yellow-red card)	(Report)	Surmann 10'; Azzouzi 52' (pen.), 86' (pen.); Everaldo 87'	Stadium: Waldstadion; Attendance: 16,000; Referee: Schmidt

13 October 2001 9	1. FC Union Berlin	0–4	Eintracht Frankfurt	Berlin, Germany
15:00 CEST		(Report)	Kryszałowicz 3', 68', 70' (pen.); Yang 57'	Stadium: Stadion an der alten Försterei; Attendance: 14,500; Referee: Scheppe

21 October 2001 10	Eintracht Frankfurt	2–2	Alemannia Aachen	Frankfurt, Germany
15:00 CEST	Skela 66', 69'	(Report)	Caillas 28'; Diané 79'	Stadium: Waldstadion; Attendance: 16,000; Referee: Späker

28 October 2001 11	SpVgg Unterhaching	0–1	Eintracht Frankfurt	Unterhaching, Germany
15:00 CEST		(Report)	Kryszałowicz 63'	Stadium: Sportpark Unterhaching; Attendance: 9,000; Referee: Kinhöfer

5 November 2001 12	Eintracht Frankfurt	1–0	VfL Bochum	Frankfurt, Germany
20:15 CEST	Kryszałowicz 56'	(Report)		Stadium: Waldstadion; Attendance: 13,500; Referee: Wack

19 November 2001 13	Mainz 05	1–1	Eintracht Frankfurt	Mainz, Germany
20:15 CEST	Friedrich 78'	(Report)	Skela 63'	Stadium: Bruchwegstadion; Attendance: 15,500; Referee: Aust

23 November 2001 14	Eintracht Frankfurt	1–1	Hannover 96	Frankfurt, Germany
19:00 CEST	Kryszałowicz 30'	(Report)	Štefulj 38'	Stadium: Waldstadion; Attendance: 17,000; Referee: Keßler

2 December 2001 15	Rot-Weiß Oberhausen	2–1	Eintracht Frankfurt	Oberhausen, Germany
15:00 CEST	Belyakov 59'; Chiquinho 77'	(Report)	Kryszałowicz 78'	Stadium: Niederrheinstadion; Attendance: 5,500; Referee: Voss

9 December 2001 16	Eintracht Frankfurt	1–2	LR Ahlen	Frankfurt, Germany
15:00 CEST	Skela 50' (pen.)	(Report)	Arnold 34'; Feinbier 57'	Stadium: Waldstadion; Attendance: 11,500; Referee: Anklam

15 December 2001 17	Babelsberg 03	1–3	Eintracht Frankfurt	Potsdam, Germany
14:00 CEST	Chałaśkiewicz 47' (pen.)	(Report)	Preuß 14', 32'; Kryszałowicz 27' (pen.)	Stadium: Karl-Liebknecht-Stadion; Attendance: 3,800; Referee: Fröhlich

18 December 2001 18	SSV Reutlingen	2–1	Eintracht Frankfurt	Reutlingen, Germany
19:00 CEST	Garcia 66'; Djappa 87'	(Report)	Kryszałowicz 20'	Stadium: Stadion an der Kreuzeiche; Attendance: 8,000; Referee: Fröhlich

27 January 2002 19	Eintracht Frankfurt	2–2	Waldhof Mannheim	Frankfurt, Germany
15:00 CEST	Ćirić 20', 70'	(Report)	Licht 47' (pen.); Everaldo 67'	Stadium: Waldstadion; Attendance: 15,000; Referee: Gagelmann

1 February 2002 20	1. FC Schweinfurt 05	0–1	Eintracht Frankfurt	Schweinfurt, Germany
19:00 CEST	Stockmann (yellow card) 74' (yellow-red card)	(Report)	Rasiejewski 81'	Stadium: Willy-Sachs-Stadion; Attendance: 10,000; Referee: Gräfe

5 February 2002 21	Eintracht Frankfurt	2–2	1. FC Saarbrücken	Frankfurt, Germany
19:00 CEST	Preuß 69'; Ćirić 75'	(Report)	Choji 8'; Kovačević 80'	Stadium: Waldstadion; Attendance: 11,500; Referee: Brych

9 February 2002 22	Eintracht Frankfurt	3–1	Karlsruher SC	Frankfurt, Germany
15:00 CEST	Ćirić 15', 45', 84' (pen.)	(Report)	Rothenbach 71'; Ertl (red card) 85'	Stadium: Waldstadion; Attendance: 13,500; Referee: Koop

18 February 2002 23	Arminia Bielefeld	4–1	Eintracht Frankfurt	Bielefeld, Germany
20:15 CEST	Dammeier 33', 76'; Albayrak 46'; Brinkmann 78'	(Report)	Ćirić 56' (pen.)	Stadium: Bielefelder Alm; Attendance: 10,500; Referee: Steinborn

24 February 2002 24	Eintracht Frankfurt	2–0	MSV Duisburg	Frankfurt, Germany
15:00 CEST	Ćirić 65'; Skela 90'	(Report)		Stadium: Waldstadion; Attendance: 10,500; Referee: Lange

3 March 2002 25	SpVgg Greuther Fürth	1–1	Eintracht Frankfurt	Fürth, Germany
15:00 CEST	Azzouzi 20' (pen.); Everaldo (red card) 81'	(Report)	Ćirić 58' (pen.); Rasiejewski (yellow card) 86' (yellow-red card)	Stadium: Playmobil-Stadion; Attendance: 11,500; Referee: Weiner

10 March 2002 26	Eintracht Frankfurt	2–2	1. FC Union Berlin	Frankfurt, Germany
15:00 CEST	Kryszałowicz 11'; Guié-Mien 74'; Schur (red card) 90'	(Report)	Menze 57'; Đurković 86'	Stadium: Waldstadion; Attendance: 16,500; Referee: Perl

15 March 2002 27	Alemannia Aachen	2–1	Eintracht Frankfurt	Aachen, Germany
19:00 CEST	Ivanović 43'; Heeren 49'	(Report)	Bindewald 89'	Stadium: Tivoli; Attendance: 10,500; Referee: Strampe

23 March 2002 28	Eintracht Frankfurt	3–2	SpVgg Unterhaching	Frankfurt, Germany
15:00 CEST	Guié-Mien 20' (pen.); Famewo 44'; Jones 76'	(Report)	Grassow (red card) 18'; Copado 52'; Seifert 66'	Stadium: Waldstadion; Attendance: 10,500; Referee: Meyer

1 April 2002 29	VfL Bochum	3–0	Eintracht Frankfurt	Bochum, Germany
20:15 CEST	Ristau 3'; Christiansen 45' (pen.), 58'	(Report)		Stadium: Ruhrstadion; Attendance: 17,500; Referee: Lutz-Michael Fröhlich

8 April 2002 30	Eintracht Frankfurt	0–0	Mainz 05	Frankfurt, Germany
20:15 CEST		(Report)		Stadium: Waldstadion; Attendance: 21,500; Referee: Albrecht

13 April 2002 31	Hannover 96	1–2	Eintracht Frankfurt	Hanover, Germany
15:00 CEST	N'Diaye 10'	(Report)	Ćirić 16'; Schur 32'	Stadium: Niedersachsenstadion; Attendance: 25,000; Referee: Kircher

19 April 2002 32	Eintracht Frankfurt	2–2	Rot-Weiß Oberhausen	Frankfurt, Germany
19:00 CEST	Kryszałowicz 27'; Streit 59'	(Report)	Chiquinho 32'; Belyakov 88'	Stadium: Waldstadion; Attendance: 6,000; Referee: Gräfe

28 April 2002 33	LR Ahlen	0–1	Eintracht Frankfurt	Ahlen, Germany
15:00 CEST		(Report)	Yang 83'	Stadium: Wersestadion; Attendance: 5,500; Referee: Kammerer

5 May 2002 34	Eintracht Frankfurt	1–1	Babelsberg 03	Frankfurt, Germany
15:00 CEST	Yang 32'	(Report)	Kampf 25'	Stadium: Waldstadion; Attendance: 8,500; Referee: Fleischer

==== DFB-Pokal ====
25 August 2001 First round	FC St. Pauli II	0–1 (a.e.t.)	Eintracht Frankfurt	Hamburg, Germany
15:30 CEST		(Report)	Wimmer (yellow card) 34' (yellow-red card); Skela 119' (pen.)	Stadium: Millerntor-Stadion; Attendance: 5,500; Referee: Koop

28 November 2001 Second round	Werder Bremen II	3–3 (a.e.t.) (2–4 p)	Eintracht Frankfurt	Bremen, Germany
19:30 CEST	Mamoum 20'; Kern 47', 65'	(Report)	Ćirić 45', 72', 90'	Stadium: Sportpark Vinnenweg; Attendance: 1,000; Referee: Margenberg
	Penalties
	Kryszałowicz (penalty missed); Ćirić (penalty scored); Rada (penalty scored); Skela (penalty scored); Bindewald (penalty scored)		(penalty scored) Schierenbeck; (penalty scored) Schulz; (penalty missed) Kern; (penalty missed) Borel

12 December 2001 Round of 16	Eintracht Frankfurt	1–2 (a.e.t.)	Hertha BSC	Frankfurt, Germany
19:00 CEST	Yang 23'	(Report)	Šimunić 75'; Dárdai 96'	Stadium: Waldstadion; Attendance: 10,000; Referee: Sippel

== Players ==
=== First-team squad ===
Squad at end of season

Note: Flags indicate national team as defined under FIFA eligibility rules; some limited exceptions apply. Players may hold more than one non-FIFA nationality.

No.	Pos.	Nation	Player
1	GK	MKD	Oka Nikolov (Note: Nikolov was born in Erbach im Odenwald, West Germany (now Germany), but also qualified to represent Macedonia (now North Macedonia) internationally and made his international debut for Macedonia in September 1998.)
2	MF	AUT	Gerd Wimmer
3	MF	GER	Marco Gebhardt
4	DF	GER	Andree Wiedener
5	DF	GER	Karel Rada
6	DF	GER	Jens Rasiejewski
7	MF	ALB	Ervin Skela
8	DF	GER	Michael Wenczel
9	FW	POL	Paweł Kryszałowicz
11	MF	SVK	Peter Németh
12	DF	KOR	Sim Jae-won
13	DF	GER	Uwe Bindewald
14	FW	MKD	Saša Ćirić
15	MF	CGO	Rolf-Christel Guié-Mien
16	DF	CMR	Serge Branco

No.	Pos.	Nation	Player
18	MF	GER	Michael Mutzel
19	MF	GER	Albert Streit (Note: Streit was born in Bucharest, Romania, but was raised in Germany and represented Germany at U-16, U-17, U-18 and B level.)
20	DF	GER	Christoph Preuß
21	FW	CHN	Yang Chen
22	FW	GER	Ralf Schmitt
23	MF	NGA	Stephen Famewo
24	MF	GER	Alexander Schur
25	MF	GER	Alexander Rosen
26	DF	GER	Giuseppe Gemiti
28	MF	GER	Jermaine Jones (Note: Jones was born in Frankfurt, West Germany (now Germany), and represented Germany at U-20, U-21 and B level before making his international debut for Germany in 2008, but also qualified to represent the United States internationally through his father and made his international debut for the United States in October 2010.)
29	DF	CRO	Vladimir Maljković
30	GK	GER	Andreas Menger
31	GK	GER	Daniel Haas
32	GK	GER	Dirk Heinen

=== Left club during season ===
Note: Flags indicate national team as defined under FIFA eligibility rules; some limited exceptions apply. Players may hold more than one non-FIFA nationality.

No.	Pos.	Nation	Player
4	DF	NOR	Tommy Berntsen (to Lyn Fotball)
6	MF	GER	Markus Lösch (to Stuttgarter Kickers)

No.	Pos.	Nation	Player
17	FW	GER	Thomas Reichenberger (to Energie Cottbus)

=== Eintracht Frankfurt II ===
Note: Flags indicate national team as defined under FIFA eligibility rules; some limited exceptions apply. Players may hold more than one non-FIFA nationality.

No.	Pos.	Nation	Player
—	GK	GER	Daniel Haas
—	GK	GER	Sven Schmitt
—	DF	GER	Lars Weißenfeldt

No.	Pos.	Nation	Player
—	DF	CMR	Jean-Paul Ndeki
—	MF	GER	Peter Deißenberger
—	MF	GER	Giovanni Speranza (Note: Speranza was born in Giessen, West Germany (now Germany), but also qualified to represent Italy internationally and represented Italy in futsal.)

=== Under-19s ===
Note: Flags indicate national team as defined under FIFA eligibility rules; some limited exceptions apply. Players may hold more than one non-FIFA nationality.

No. / Pos. / Nation / Player; — / DF / GER / Baldo di Gregorio	No. / Pos. / Nation / Player; — / MF / GER / Daniyel Cimen

=== Under-17s ===
Note: Flags indicate national team as defined under FIFA eligibility rules; some limited exceptions apply. Players may hold more than one non-FIFA nationality.

No.	Pos.	Nation	Player
—	GK	GER	Jan Zimmermann
—	DF	GER	Christopher Reinhard

No.	Pos.	Nation	Player
—	DF	GER	Marco Russ
—	MF	GER	Faton Toski (Note: Toski was born in Gjilan, SFR Yugoslavia (now Kosovo, but then part of Serbia and Montenegro), but was raised in Germany and represented Germany at U-19 level before making his international debut for Kosovo in March 2014.)

== Statistics ==
=== Appearances and goals ===
No.	Pos	Nat	Player	Total		2. Bundesliga		DFB-Pokal	
No.	Pos	Nat	Player	Apps	Goals	Apps	Goals	Apps	Goals
1	GK	(North Macedonia) MKD	Oka Nikolov	19	0	19	0	0	0
2	DF	(Austria) AUT	Gerd Wimmer	31	0	29	0	2	0
3	MF	(Germany) GER	Marco Gebhardt	16	0	15	0	1	0
4	DF	(Norway) NOR	~~Tommy Berntsen~~	0	0	0	0	0	0
4	DF	(Germany) GER	Andree Wiedener	14	0	14	0	0	0
5	DF	(Czech Republic) CZE	Karel Rada	30	0	27	0	3	0
6	MF	(Germany) GER	Jens Rasiejewski	27	1	24	1	3	0
7	MF	(Albania) ALB	Ervin Skela	32	9	29	8	3	1
8	DF	(Germany) GER	Michael Wenczel	6	0	5	0	1	0
9	FW	(Poland) POL	Paweł Kryszałowicz	32	16	30	16	2	0
11	MF	(Slovakia) SVK	Peter Németh	15	0	13	0	2	0
12	DF	(South Korea) KOR	Sim Jae-Won	21	0	19	0	2	0
13	DF	(Germany) GER	Uwe Bindewald	30	1	27	1	3	0
14	FW	(North Macedonia) MKD	Saša Ćirić	18	13	16	10	2	3
15	MF	(Republic of the Congo) CGO	Rolf-Christel Guié-Mien	29	3	26	3	3	0
16	MF	(Cameroon) CMR	Serge Branco	8	0	7	0	1	0
17	FW	(Germany) GER	~~Thomas Reichenberger~~	6	0	5	0	1	0
18	MF	(Germany) GER	Michael Mutzel	12	0	12	0	0	0
19	MF	(Germany) GER	Albert Streit	18	1	17	1	1	0
20	MF	(Germany) GER	Christoph Preuß	34	4	31	4	3	0
21	FW	(China) CHN	Yang Chen	31	6	29	5	2	1
22	FW	(Germany) GER	Yılmaz Örtülü	1	0	1	0	0	0
23	MF	(Nigeria) NGA	Stephen Famewo	3	1	3	1	0	0
24	MF	(Germany) GER	Alexander Schur	20	1	19	1	1	0
25	MF	(Germany) GER	Alexander Rosen	3	0	3	0	0	0
26	MF	(Germany) GER	Giuseppe Gemiti	13	0	12	0	1	0
27	MF	(Germany) GER	Giovanni Speranza	2	0	2	0	0	0
32	GK	(Germany) GER	Dirk Heinen	18	0	15	0	3	0
37	MF	(Germany) GER	Jermaine Jones	24	1	22	1	2	0

=== Transfers ===
==== Summer ====
In:

No.	Pos.	Nation	Player
7	MF	ALB	Ervin Skela (from Waldhof Mannheim)
8	MF	GER	Michael Wenczel (from VfR Mannheim)
11	MF	SVK	Peter Németh (loaned from Baník Ostrava)
12	DF	KOR	Sim Jae-Won (loaned from Busan i.cons)
13	MF	TUR	Erol Bulut (loan return from Adanaspor)
22	FW	GER	Yılmaz Örtülü (from Eintracht Frankfurt Amateure)
23	MF	NGA	Stephen Famewo (Eintracht Frankfurt academy)
27	MF	GER	Giovanni Speranza (from Eintracht Frankfurt Amateure)

Out:

No.	Pos.	Nation	Player
2	DF	GER	Torsten Kracht (to Karlsruher SC)
5	DF	BUL	Petar Hubchev (to Eintracht Frankfurt Amateure)
6	DF	GER	Markus Lösch (to Stuttgarter Kickers)
7	MF	GER	Thomas Sobotzik (to Rapid Wien)
8	MF	GER	Ralf Weber (retired)
10	MF	GER	Horst Heldt (to Sturm Graz)
13	MF	TUR	Erol Bulut (to Panonios)
17	FW	GER	Thomas Reichenberger (to FC Energie Cottbus)
18	DF	GER	Alexander Kutschera (to Xerez CD)
23	GK	GER	Sven Schmitt (to Eintracht Frankfurt Amateure)
25	MF	GER	Frank Gerster (to SSV Reutlingen)
29	MF	GER	Stefan Zinnow (to Waldhof Mannheim)
31	MF	GER	Peter Deißenberger (to Eintracht Frankfurt Amateure)

==== Winter ====
In:

No.	Pos.	Nation	Player
4	DF	GER	Andree Wiedener (from Werder Bremen)

Out:

No.	Pos.	Nation	Player
4	DF	NOR	Tommy Berntsen (to FK Lyn)
16	MF	GER	Olaf Janßen (retired)
17	MF	TUR	Erol Bulut (loaned to Adanaspor)
30	MF	GER	Thomas Zampach (retired)

== Sources ==
- Matheja, Ulrich (2011). Unsere Eintracht - Eintracht Frankfurt - Die Chronik. Die Werkstatt. ISBN 978-3-89533-750-5.
