= 2000–01 Eintracht Frankfurt season =

Eintracht Frankfurt
2000-01 season
- Chairman: Rolf Heller
- Manager: Felix Magath (resigned 29 January 2001); Rolf Dohmen (appointed 29 January 2001, resigned 3 April 2001); Friedel Rausch (3 April 2001, resigned 19 May 2001)
- Bundesliga: 17th
- DFB-Pokal: First round
- Top goalscorer: League: Paweł Kryszałowicz (7); All: Paweł Kryszałowicz (7)
- Highest home attendance: 56,000 (vs Bayern Munich, 21 April)
- Lowest home attendance: 14,000 (vs VfL Bochum, 5 May)
- Average home league attendance: 29,265
Home colours	Away colours	Third colours

The 2000–01 Eintracht Frankfurt season was the 101st season in the club's football history. In 2000–01 the club played in the Bundesliga, the top tier of German football. It was the club's 99th season in the first tier.

== Results ==
=== Friendlies ===
Win Draw Loss

1 July 2000	RSV Weyer	0–16	Eintracht Frankfurt	Villmar, Germany
		(Report)	Schur 15'; Reichenberger 27', 42'; Fjørtoft 29'; Sobotzik 31', 34'; Yang 49', 78'; Gerster 53'; Salou 60', 81'; Rasiejewski 64', 88'; Heldt 70'; Guié-Mien 75', 84'	Attendance: 2,500

5 July 2000	Eintracht Zinnowitz / Medizin Bansin	0–10	Eintracht Frankfurt	Zinnowitz, Germany
		(Report)	Sobotzik 18' (pen.); Fjørtoft; Salou; Bindewald; Deißenberger; Reichenberger; Gerster (pen.); Hrutka	Stadium: Sportschule Zinnowitz; Attendance: 1,400

7 July 2000	Greifswalder SC	1–6	Eintracht Frankfurt	Zinnowitz, Germany
	Goal	(Report)	Heldt; Hrutka; Deißenberger; Janßen; Yang; Hubchev	Stadium: Sportschule Zinnowitz; Attendance: 1,300

9 July 2000	Berliner FC Dynamo	1–1	Eintracht Frankfurt	Zinnowitz, Germany
	Hahn 53'	(Report)	Schur 49'	Stadium: Sportschule Zinnowitz; Attendance: 1,500

12 July 2000	SC Neukirchen	1–0	Eintracht Frankfurt	Neukirchen, Germany
15:30 CEST	Markišić 85'	(Report)		Stadium: Knüllkampfbahn; Attendance: 1,500

15 July 2000	Eintracht Frankfurt	4–2	Fortuna Düsseldorf	Königstein, Germany
15:30 CEST	Sobotzik 8', 42'; Reichenberger 18'; Heldt 43' (pen.)	(Report)	Džafić 6'; Klein 85'	Stadium: Rasensportanlage Altkönigblick

16 July 2000	VfB Marburg	2–4	Eintracht Frankfurt	Marburg, Germany
17:00 CEST	Lang	(Report)	Yang; Guié-Mien; Sobotzik; Fjørtoft	Stadium: Georg-Gaßmann-Stadion; Attendance: 4,000

21 July 2000 Group match Kaiserstuhl-Cup	Bahlinger SC	1–6	Eintracht Frankfurt	Bahlingen, Germany
15:30 CEST	Goal	(Report)	Ćirić 8'; Reichenberger 30', 56', 64'; Sobotzik 36'; Guié-Mien 41'	Stadium: Kaiserstuhlstadion; Attendance: 1,200

22 July 2000 Final match Kaiserstuhl-Cup	Eintracht Frankfurt	0–0 (4–2 p)	1. FC Nürnberg	Bahlingen, Germany
15:30 CEST		(Report)		Stadium: Kaiserstuhlstadion; Attendance: 1,500
	Penalties
	Heldt (penalty scored); Gebhardt (penalty scored); Kutschera (penalty missed); Kracht (penalty missed)		(penalty scored) Störzenhofecker; (penalty scored) Tavčar; (penalty scored) Kos; (penalty scored) Nikl

26 July 2000	PAOK	5–1	Eintracht Frankfurt	Farchant, Germany
	Gortiadis 21'; Okkas 44'; Patzis 71'; Spasić 82'; Kafes 88'	(Report)	Heldt 73' (pen.)	Attendance: 500; Referee: Albrecht

30 July 2000	Lazio	1–2	Eintracht Frankfurt	Schruns, Austria
	Ravanelli 45'	(Report)	Reichenberger 8'; Yang 87'	Attendance: 3,500

1 August 2000	KSV Klein-Karben	2–1	Eintracht Frankfurt
	Gebhardt 23' (o.g.); Džihić 42'	(Report)	Guié-Mien 50'	Attendance: 2,200

5 August 2000	1. FC Saarbrücken	2–1	Eintracht Frankfurt	Neunkirchen, Germany
15:30 CEST	Guié-Mien 35' (o.g.); Kushev 85'	(Report)	Heldt 76'	Stadium: Ellenfeldstadion; Attendance: 2,000

29 August 2000	Oberursel XI	2–4	Eintracht Frankfurt	Oberursel
	Dogan	(Report)	Kracht; Deißenberger 65'; Hubchev 86'; Fjørtoft 88'	Stadium: Stierstädter Heide; Attendance: 2,500

1 September 2000	Waldhof Mannheim	1–2	Eintracht Frankfurt	Mannheim, Germany
	Vincze 50' (pen.)	(Report)	Reichenberger 16', 29'	Stadium: Seppl-Herberger-Stadion; Attendance: 1,000

7 October 2000	Royal Antwerp	1–2	Eintracht Frankfurt	Rödermark, Germany
	Goots 53'	(Report)	Schmitt 30'; Reichenberger 34'	Stadium: Sportanlage Frankfurter Straße; Attendance: 600

9 January 2001	SG Weinsheim	0–14	Eintracht Frankfurt	Weinsheim
		(Report)	Kryszałowicz; Schmitt; Guié-Mien; Fjørtoft; Mutzel; Schur; Kracht	Stadium: Sportplatz am Palmstein; Attendance: 1,000

11 January 2001	Wormatia Worms	0–4	Eintracht Frankfurt	Worms
18:30 CEST		(Report)	Wimmer; Sobotzik; Kryszałowicz	Stadium: Wormatia-Stadion; Attendance: 1,000

13 January 2001	Stuttgarter Kickers	4–1	Eintracht Frankfurt	Ilsfeld, Germany
15:30 CEST	Goal	(Report)	Yang	Attendance: 600

16 January 2001	Mainz 05	3–1	Eintracht Frankfurt	Trebur, Germany
	Thurk 44'; Voronin 65'; Babatz 86'	(Report)	Branco 79'	Attendance: 1,000

18 January 2001	SV Wehen	0–3	Eintracht Frankfurt	Frankfurt, Germany
		(Report)	Yang 31'; Kryszałowicz 40'; Berntsen 81'	Stadium: Waldstadion

20 January 2001	SSV Reutlingen	2–1	Eintracht Frankfurt	Reutlingen, Germany
	Sumiala 78', 90'	(Report)	Kryszałowicz 26'	Stadium: Stadion an der Kreuzeiche; Attendance: 3,500; Referee: Ertl

24 January 2001	Villarreal CF	1–0	Eintracht Frankfurt	Villarreal, Spain
	Escoda 59'	(Report)		Stadium: Estadio El Madrigal; Attendance: 10,000

24 April 2001	Darmstadt 98	1–3	Eintracht Frankfurt	Darmstadt, Germany
	Corrochano	(Report)	Heldt; Lösch; Schur	Stadium: Jonathan-Heimes-Stadion am Böllenfalltor; Attendance: 3,500; Referee: Trautmann

=== Indoor soccer tournaments ===
==== Schwerin ====
4 January 2001 First match	Hansa Rostock	3–1	Eintracht Frankfurt	Schwerin, Germany
	Goal	(Report)	Kryszałowicz	Stadium: Sport- und Kongresshalle; Attendance: 5,200

4 January 2001 Second match	Eintracht Schwerin	1–4	Eintracht Frankfurt	Schwerin, Germany
	Goal	(Report)	Preuß; Wimmer; Kryszałowicz	Stadium: Sport- und Kongresshalle; Attendance: 5,200

4 January 2001 Semi-final match	Werder Bremen	4–3	Eintracht Frankfurt	Schwerin, Germany
	Wiedener	(Report)	Kryszałowicz; Gemiti; Deißenberger	Stadium: Sport- und Kongresshalle; Attendance: 5,200

==== Stuttgart ====
6 January 2001 First match	1. FC Saarbrücken	3–3	Eintracht Frankfurt	Stuttgart, Germany
	Choji; Bartolović	(Report)	Kryszałowicz; Gebhardt	Stadium: Hanns-Martin-Schleyer-Halle

6 January 2001 Second match	VfB Stuttgart	2–1	Eintracht Frankfurt	Stuttgart, Germany
	Tiffert; Wenzel	(Report)	Preuß	Stadium: Hanns-Martin-Schleyer-Halle

=== Competitions ===
Win Draw Loss

==== Bundesliga ====
===== League table =====
Pos	Team	Pld	W	D	L	GF	GA	GD	Pts	Qualification or relegation
14	Energie Cottbus	34	12	3	19	38	52	−14	39	
15	VfB Stuttgart	34	9	11	14	42	49	−7	38	
16	SpVgg Unterhaching (R)	34	8	11	15	35	59	−24	35	Relegation to 2. Bundesliga
17	Eintracht Frankfurt (R)	34	10	5	19	41	68	−27	35	Relegation to 2. Bundesliga
18	VfL Bochum (R)	34	7	6	21	30	67	−37	27	Relegation to 2. Bundesliga

Source: www.dfb.de
Rules for classification: 1) points; 2) goal difference; 3) number of goals scored.
(R) Relegated

===== Results summary =====
Overall								Home						Away					
Pld	W	D	L	GF	GA	GD	Pts	W	D	L	GF	GA	GD	W	D	L	GF	GA	GD
34	10	5	19	41	68	−27	35	8	3	6	26	22	+4	2	2	13	15	46	−31

Source: Competitive matches

===== Results by round =====
Round	1	2	3	4	5	6	7	8	9	10	11	12	13	14	15	16	17	18	19	20	21	22	23	24	25	26	27	28	29	30	31	32	33	34
Ground	H	A	H	A	H	A	H	A	A	H	A	H	A	H	A	H	A	A	H	A	H	A	H	A	H	H	A	H	A	H	A	H	A	H
Result	W	L	L	L	W	D	D	L	L	W	L	W	W	L	L	L	L	L	L	W	W	D	L	L	D	D	L	L	L	L	L	W	L	W
Position	3	10	5	9	6	5	6	10	12	9	9	9	5	8	9	12	14	15	16	13	12	12	14	15	14	15	15	16	17	17	17	17	17	17

Source: kicker.de
A = Away; H = Home; W = Win; D = Draw; L = Loss

===== Matches =====
13 August 2000 1	Eintracht Frankfurt	3–0	SpVgg Unterhaching	Frankfurt, Germany
17:30 CEST	Kracht 29'; Ćirić 49'; Heldt 78' (pen.)	(Report)		Stadium: Waldstadion; Attendance: 28,500; Referee: Strampe

20 August 2000 2	1. FC Köln	4–1	Eintracht Frankfurt	Cologne, Germany
17:30 CEST	Voigt 25'; Scherz 39'; Springer 58'; Kreuz 90'	(Report)	Kutschera 82'	Stadium: Müngersdorfer Stadion; Attendance: 35,000; Referee: Jansen

6 September 2000 3	Eintracht Frankfurt	4–0	Hansa Rostock	Frankfurt, Germany
20:15 CEST	Reichenberger 60', 81'; Heldt 65' (pen.), 79' (pen.)	(Report)		Stadium: Waldstadion; Attendance: 20,500; Referee: Weiner

10 September 2000 4	Energie Cottbus	2–0	Eintracht Frankfurt	Cottbus, Germany
17:30 CEST	Labak 72'; Helbig 90'	(Report)		Stadium: Stadion der Freundschaft; Attendance: 14,000; Referee: Aust

16 September 2000 5	Eintracht Frankfurt	1–0	TSV 1860 Munich	Frankfurt, Germany
15:30 CEST	Reichenberger 32'	(Report)		Stadium: Waldstadion; Attendance: 25,500; Referee: Krug

23 September 2000 6	Werder Bremen	1–1	Eintracht Frankfurt	Bremen, Germany
15:30 CEST	Ernst 42'	(Report)	Heldt 8' (pen.); Hubchev (red card) 49'	Stadium: Weserstadion; Attendance: 26,500; Referee: Sippel

29 September 2000 7	Eintracht Frankfurt	1–1	Borussia Dortmund	Frankfurt, Germany
20:15 CEST	Wimmer 21'	(Report)	Bobic 71'	Stadium: Waldstadion; Attendance: 38,500; Referee: Albrecht

14 October 2000 8	FC Schalke 04	4–0	Eintracht Frankfurt	Gelsenkirchen, Germany
15:30 CEST	Böhme 37', 53'; Látal 51'; Happe 62'	(Report)	Wimmer (yellow card) 48' (yellow-red card)	Stadium: Parkstadion; Attendance: 44,000; Referee: Meyer

21 October 2000 9	Hamburger SV	2–0	Eintracht Frankfurt	Hamburg, Germany
15:30 CEST	Barbarez 36'; Kovač 69'	(Report)		Stadium: Volksparkstadion; Attendance: 41,500; Referee: Fröhlich

28 October 2000 10	Eintracht Frankfurt	3–0	SC Freiburg	Frankfurt, Germany
15:30 CEST	Reichenberger 10'; Fjørtoft 21'; Branco 84'	(Report)	Kondé (yellow card) 78' (yellow-red card)	Stadium: Waldstadion; Attendance: 24,000; Referee: Strampe

3 November 2000 11	Bayer Leverkusen	1–0	Eintracht Frankfurt	Leverkusen
15:30 CEST	Ballack 79'	(Report)		Stadium: BayArena; Attendance: 22,500; Referee: Fleischer

11 November 2000 12	Eintracht Frankfurt	3–1	1. FC Kaiserslautern	Frankfurt, Germany
15:30 CEST	Reichenberger 44'; Sobotzik 52'; Fjørtoft 77'	(Report)	Kłos 83'	Stadium: Waldstadion; Attendance: 35,000; Referee: Stark

18 November 2000 13	Bayern Munich	1–2	Eintracht Frankfurt	Munich
15:30 CEST	Paulo Sérgio 13'	(Report)	Schur 38'; Fjørtoft 63'	Stadium: Olympiastadion; Attendance: 47,000; Referee: Steinborn

25 November 2000 14	Eintracht Frankfurt	0–4	Hertha BSC	Frankfurt, Germany
15:30 CEST	Preuß (red card) 64'	(Report)	van Burik 18'; Konstantinidis 21'; Preetz 82', 89'	Stadium: Waldstadion; Attendance: 32,000; Referee: Krug

2 December 2000 15	VfL Bochum	2–1	Eintracht Frankfurt	Bochum, Germany
15:30 CEST	Drinčić 15'; Fahrenhorst 37'	(Report)	Reichenberger 48'	Stadium: Ruhrstadion; Attendance: 17,500; Referee: Heynemann

8 December 2000 16	Eintracht Frankfurt	1–2	VfL Wolfsburg	Frankfurt, Germany
20:15 CEST	Gebhardt 13'	(Report)	Juskowiak 52'; Marić 74'	Stadium: Waldstadion; Attendance: 20,000; Referee: Gagelmann

12 December 2000 17	VfB Stuttgart	4–1	Eintracht Frankfurt	Stuttgart, Germany
20:15 CEST	Maljković 34' (o.g.); Soldo 60'; Ganea 76'; Dundee 84'	(Report)	Gebhardt 38'	Stadium: Gottlieb-Daimler-Stadion; Attendance: 15,000; Referee: Sippel

15 December 2000 18	SpVgg Unterhaching	2–0	Eintracht Frankfurt	Unterhaching, Germany
20:15 CEST	Hirsch 20'; Breitenreiter 86'	(Report)		Stadium: Sportpark Unterhaching; Attendance: 6,000; Referee: Kemmling

27 January 2001 19	Eintracht Frankfurt	1–5	1. FC Köln	Frankfurt, Germany
20:15 CEST	Kryszałowicz 63'	(Report)	Kurth 12', 41'; Kracht 28' (o.g.); Scherz 35'; Arveladze 89'	Stadium: Waldstadion; Attendance: 28,000; Referee: Stark

4 February 2001 20	Hansa Rostock	0–2	Eintracht Frankfurt	Rostock, Germany
17:30 CEST	Schröder (yellow card) 36' (yellow-red card)	(Report)	Kryszałowicz 30'; Gebhardt 45'; Kracht (red card) 66'; Yang (yellow card) 90' (yellow-red card)	Stadium: Ostseestadion; Attendance: 11,000; Referee: Wack

9 February 2001 21	Eintracht Frankfurt	1–0	Energie Cottbus	Frankfurt, Germany
20:15 CEST	Heldt 65'	(Report)		Stadium: Waldstadion; Attendance: 20,000; Referee: Merk

16 February 2001 22	TSV 1860 Munich	2–2	Eintracht Frankfurt	Munich, Germany
20:15 CEST	Max 72'; Häßler 81' (pen.)	(Report)	Yang 22'; Kryszałowicz 59'	Stadium: Olympiastadion; Attendance: 20,000; Referee: Weiner

24 February 2001 23	Eintracht Frankfurt	1–2	Werder Bremen	Frankfurt, Germany
15:30 CEST	Baumann 90' (o.g.)	(Report)	Aílton 21'; Pizarro 90'	Stadium: Waldstadion; Attendance: 21,000; Referee: Aust

2 March 2001 24	Borussia Dortmund	6–1	Eintracht Frankfurt	Dortmund, Germany
20:00 CEST	Wörns 30'; Ricken 64', 67'; Bobic 71', 90'; Addo 79'	(Report)	Schur (yellow card) 26' (yellow-red card); Yang 48'	Stadium: Westfalenstadion; Attendance: 62,000; Referee: Kemmling

10 March 2001 25	Eintracht Frankfurt	0–0	FC Schalke 04	Frankfurt, Germany
20:15 CEST		(Report)		Stadium: Waldstadion; Attendance: 37,500; Referee: Albrecht

17 March 2001 26	Eintracht Frankfurt	1–1	Hamburger SV	Frankfurt, Germany
15:30 CEST	Sobotzik 78'	(Report)	Kovač 54'	Stadium: Waldstadion; Attendance: 33,000; Referee: Fleischer

31 March 2001 27	SC Freiburg	5–2	Eintracht Frankfurt	Freiburg
15:30 CEST	Iashvili 32'; Kobiashvili 40'; Sellimi 53', 90'; Kehl 83'	(Report)	Kryszałowicz 70', 72'	Stadium: Dreisamstadion; Attendance: 25,000; Referee: Fandel

7 April 2001 28	Eintracht Frankfurt	1–3	Bayer Leverkusen	Frankfurt, Germany
15:30 CEST	Yang 58'	(Report)	Kirsten 21'; Kovač (yellow card) 36' (yellow-red card); Lúcio 67', 82'	Stadium: Waldstadion; Attendance: 30,000; Referee: Keßler

14 April 2001 29	1. FC Kaiserslautern	4–2	Eintracht Frankfurt	Kaiserslautern, Germany
15:30 CEST	Lokvenc 1', 52'; Basler 50'; Klose 89'	(Report)	Guié-Mien 21'; Kryszałowicz 36'	Stadium: Fritz-Walter-Stadion; Attendance: 41,500; Referee: Krug

21 April 2001 30	Eintracht Frankfurt	0–2	Bayern Munich	Frankfurt, Germany
15:30 CEST		(Report)	Scholl 22'; Tarnat 90'	Stadium: Waldstadion; Attendance: 56,000; Referee: Jansen

28 April 2001 31	Hertha BSC	3–0	Eintracht Frankfurt	Berlin
15:30 CEST	Alex Alves 2', 28'; Preetz 32'	(Report)		Stadium: Olympiastadion; Attendance: 36,000; Referee: Fleischer

5 May 2001 32	Eintracht Frankfurt	3–0	VfL Bochum	Frankfurt, Germany
15:30 CEST	Branco 53' (red card) 68'; Yang 83'; Preuß 84'	(Report)	Baştürk (yellow card) 79' (yellow-red card)	Stadium: Waldstadion; Attendance: 14,000; Referee: Merk

12 May 2001 33	VfL Wolfsburg	3–0	Eintracht Frankfurt	Wolfsburg, Germany
15:30 CEST	Munteanu 12'; Greiner 16'; Kühbauer 31' (pen.)	(Report)		Stadium: VfL-Stadion; Attendance: 12,000; Referee: Krug

19 May 2001 34	Eintracht Frankfurt	2–1	VfB Stuttgart	Frankfurt, Germany
15:30 CEST	Kryszałowicz 16'; Guié-Mien 45'	(Report)	Dundee 62'	Stadium: Waldstadion; Attendance: 34,000; Referee: Fröhlich

==== DFB-Pokal ====
26 August 2000 First round	VfB Stuttgart II	6–1	Eintracht Frankfurt	Stuttgart, Germany
15:30 CEST	Vaccaro 16'; Schmiedel 34'; Vujević 50' (pen.), 67'; Amanatidis 78', 90'	(Report)	Fjørtoft 39'; Lösch (red card) 50'	Stadium: Gottlieb-Daimler-Stadion; Attendance: 1,500; Referee: Kessler

== Players ==
=== First-team squad ===
Squad at end of season

Note: Flags indicate national team as defined under FIFA eligibility rules; some limited exceptions apply. Players may hold more than one non-FIFA nationality.

No.	Pos.	Nation	Player
1	GK	MKD	Oka Nikolov (Note: Nikolov was born in Erbach im Odenwald, West Germany (now Germany), but also qualified to represent Macedonia (now North Macedonia) internationally and made his international debut for Macedonia in September 1998.)
2	DF	GER	Torsten Kracht
3	MF	GER	Marco Gebhardt
4	DF	GER	Jens Rasiejewski
5	DF	BUL	Petar Hubchev
6	MF	GER	Markus Lösch
7	MF	POL	Thomas Sobotzik
8	MF	GER	Ralf Weber
9	FW	NOR	Jan Åge Fjørtoft
10	MF	GER	Horst Heldt
11	MF	GER	Albert Streit (Note: Streit was born in Bucharest, Romania, but was raised in Germany and represented Germany at U-16, U-17, U-18 and B level.)
12	GK	GER	Dirk Heinen
14	FW	POL	Paweł Kryszałowicz
15	MF	CGO	Rolf-Christel Guié-Mien
16	DF	CMR	Serge Branco
17	FW	GER	Thomas Reichenberger
18	DF	GER	Alexander Kutschera
19	MF	AUT	Gerd Wimmer
20	DF	GER	Uwe Bindewald

No.	Pos.	Nation	Player
21	FW	CHN	Yang Chen
22	FW	GER	Ralf Schmitt
23	GK	GER	Sven Schmitt
24	MF	GER	Alexander Schur
25	MF	GER	Frank Gerster
26	FW	MKD	Saša Ćirić
27	GK	GER	Christian Marggraf
28	DF	GER	Karel Rada
29	MF	GER	Stefan Zinnow
30	DF	GER	Thomas Zampach
31	MF	GER	Peter Deißenberger
32	DF	GER	Giuseppe Gemiti
33	MF	GER	Michael Mutzel
34	DF	GER	Christoph Preuß
35	MF	GER	Alexander Rosen
37	MF	GER	Jermaine Jones (Note: Jones was born in Frankfurt, West Germany (now Germany), and represented Germany at U-20, U-21 and B level before making his international debut for Germany in 2008, but also qualified to represent the United States internationally through his father and made his international debut for the United States in October 2010.)
38	DF	CRO	Vladimir Maljković
40	DF	NOR	Tommy Berntsen
—	GK	GER	Andreas Menger

=== Left club during season ===
Note: Flags indicate national team as defined under FIFA eligibility rules; some limited exceptions apply. Players may hold more than one non-FIFA nationality.

No.	Pos.	Nation	Player
11	FW	TOG	Bachirou Salou (on loan to Hansa Rostock)
13	DF	TUR	Erol Bulut (Note: Bulut was born in Bad Schwalbach, West Germany (now Germany), but also qualified to represent Turkey internationally and represented Turkey at U-21 level and in futsal.) (on loan to Adanaspor)
14	DF	GER	Uwe Schneider (to VfR Aalen)

No.	Pos.	Nation	Player
16	MF	GER	Olaf Janßen (retired)
27	DF	HUN	János Hrutka (to Ferencváros)
36	MF	GER	Patrick Falk (to Eintracht Braunschweig)

=== Eintracht Frankfurt II ===
Note: Flags indicate national team as defined under FIFA eligibility rules; some limited exceptions apply. Players may hold more than one non-FIFA nationality.

No.	Pos.	Nation	Player
39	DF	CMR	Jean-Paul Ndeki

=== Under-19s ===
Note: Flags indicate national team as defined under FIFA eligibility rules; some limited exceptions apply. Players may hold more than one non-FIFA nationality.

No. / Pos. / Nation / Player; — / GK / GER / Daniel Haas	No. / Pos. / Nation / Player; — / MF / NGR / Stephen Famewo

=== Under-17s ===
Note: Flags indicate national team as defined under FIFA eligibility rules; some limited exceptions apply. Players may hold more than one non-FIFA nationality.

No.	Pos.	Nation	Player
—	GK	GER	Jan Zimmermann
—	DF	GER	Baldo di Gregorio
—	DF	GER	Christopher Reinhard

No.	Pos.	Nation	Player
—	DF	GER	Marco Russ
—	MF	GER	Daniyel Cimen

== Statistics ==
=== Appearances and goals ===
No.	Pos	Nat	Player	Total		Bundesliga		DFB-Pokal	
No.	Pos	Nat	Player	Apps	Goals	Apps	Goals	Apps	Goals
1	GK	(North Macedonia) MKD	Oka Nikolov	5	0	4	0	1	0
2	DF	(Germany) GER	Torsten Kracht	33	1	32	1	1	0
3	MF	(Germany) GER	Marco Gebhardt	18	3	17	3	1	0
4	DF	(Germany) GER	Jens Rasiejewski	13	0	12	0	1	0
5	DF	(Bulgaria) BUL	Petar Hubchev	19	0	18	0	1	0
6	DF	(Germany) GER	Markus Lösch	16	0	15	0	1	0
7	MF	(Germany) GER	Thomas Sobotzik	22	2	22	2	0	0
8	DF	(Germany) GER	Ralf Weber	0	0	0	0	0	0
9	FW	(Norway) NOR	Jan Åge Fjørtoft	15	4	14	3	1	1
10	MF	(Germany) GER	Horst Heldt	35	5	34	5	1	0
11	FW	(Togo) TOG	Bachirou Salou	3	0	2	0	1	0
12	GK	(Germany) GER	Dirk Heinen	30	0	30	0	0	0
13	MF	(Turkey) TUR	~~Erol Bulut~~	3	0	2	0	1	0
14	DF	(Germany) GER	~~Uwe Schneider~~	0	0	0	0	0	0
14	FW	(Poland) POL	Paweł Kryszałowicz	18	7	18	7	0	0
15	MF	(Republic of the Congo) CGO	Rolf-Christel Guié-Mien	26	2	25	2	1	0
16	MF	(Germany) GER	~~Olaf Janßen~~	0	0	0	0	0	0
16	MF	(Cameroon) CMR	Serge Branco	0	0	0	0	0	0
17	FW	(Germany) GER	Thomas Reichenberger	26	6	26	6	0	0
18	DF	(Germany) GER	Alexander Kutschera	22	1	22	1	0	0
19	MF	(Austria) AUT	Gerd Wimmer	24	1	23	1	1	0
20	DF	(Germany) GER	Uwe Bindewald	14	0	14	0	0	0
21	FW	(China) CHN	Yang Chen	15	4	15	4	0	0
22	FW	(Germany) GER	Ralf Schmitt	1	0	1	0	0	0
23	GK	(Germany) GER	Sven Schmitt	2	0	2	0	0	0
24	MF	(Germany) GER	Alexander Schur	25	1	24	1	1	0
26	FW	(North Macedonia) MKD	Saša Ćirić	9	1	9	1	0	0
27	DF	(Hungary) HUN	~~János Hrutka~~	0	0	0	0	0	0
28	DF	(Czech Republic) CZE	Karel Rada	11	0	11	0	0	0
29	MF	(Germany) GER	Stefan Zinnow	2	0	2	0	0	0
30	MF	(Germany) GER	~~Thomas Zampach~~	0	0	0	0	0	0
31	MF	(Germany) GER	Peter Deißenberger	1	0	1	0	0	0
32	MF	(Germany) GER	Giuseppe Gemiti	3	0	3	0	0	0
33	MF	(Germany) GER	Michael Mutzel	18	0	18	0	0	0
34	MF	(Germany) GER	Christoph Preuß	22	1	21	1	1	0
35	MF	(Germany) GER	Alexander Rosen	3	0	3	0	0	0
36	MF	(Germany) GER	~~Patrick Falk~~	0	0	0	0	0	0
37	MF	(Germany) GER	Jermaine Jones	2	0	2	0	0	0
38	DF	(Croatia) CRO	Vladimir Maljković	3	0	3	0	0	0
40	DF	(Norway) NOR	Tommy Berntsen	3	0	3	0	0	0
41	MF	(Germany) GER	Albert Streit	4	0	4	0	0	0

=== Transfers ===
==== Summer ====
In:

No.	Pos.	Nation	Player
13	MF	TUR	Erol Bulut (loan return from Trabzonspor)
14	FW	POL	Paweł Kryszałowicz (from Amica Wronki)
16	MF	GER	Olaf Janßen (loan return from AC Bellinzona)
16	MF	CMR	Serge Branco (from Eintracht Braunschweig)
19	MF	AUT	Gerd Wimmer (from Rapid Wien)
22	MF	GER	Ralf Schmitt (from FV Speyer)
26	FW	MKD	Saša Ćirić (from Tennis Borussia Berlin)
27	MF	HUN	János Hrutka (from Kaiserslautern)
28	DF	CZE	Karel Rada (from Slavia Praha)
31	MF	GER	Peter Deißenberger (from Würzburger FV)
32	MF	GER	Giuseppe Gemiti (from Eintracht Frankfurt II)
34	MF	GER	Christoph Preuß (from Eintracht Frankfurt II)
35	MF	GER	Alexander Rosen (loan return from FC Augsburg)
38	DF	CRO	Vladimir Maljković (from Eintracht Frankfurt II)
41	MF	GER	Albert Streit (from Eintracht Frankfurt II)

Out:

No.	Pos.	Nation	Player
11	FW	TOG	Bachirou Salou (to Hansa Rostock)
14	DF	GER	Uwe Schneider (to VfR Aalen)
25	MF	GER	Alexander Rosen (loaned to VfL Osnabrück)
27	DF	GER	Janos Hrutka (to Ferencváros)
36	MF	GER	Patrick Falk (to Eintracht Braunschweig)

==== Winter ====
In:

No.	Pos.	Nation	Player
3	DF	NOR	Tommy Berntsen (from Lillestrøm SK)
13	GK	GER	Andreas Menger (from MSV Duisburg)

Out:

No.	Pos.	Nation	Player
9	MF	NOR	Jan Åge Fjørtoft (to Stabæk IF)
16	MF	GER	Olaf Janßen (retired)
17	MF	TUR	Erol Bulut (loaned to Adanaspor)
30	MF	GER	Thomas Zampach (retired)

== Sources ==
- Matheja, Ulrich (2011). Unsere Eintracht - Eintracht Frankfurt - Die Chronik. Die Werkstatt. ISBN 978-3-89533-750-5.
