= 2001–02 VfL Bochum season =

VfL Bochum
2001–02 season
- President: Werner Altegoer
- Head Coach: Bernard Dietz, ad interim (until 3 December 2001); Peter Neururer (since 4 December 2001)
- Stadium: Ruhrstadion
- 2. Bundesliga: 3rd (promoted)
- DFB-Pokal: Second Round
- Top goalscorer: League: Christiansen (17); All: Christiansen (18)
- Highest home attendance: 17,523 (vs 1. FC Union Berlin, 28 April 2002)
- Lowest home attendance: 9,361 (vs SpVgg Unterhaching, 19 December 2001)
- Average home league attendance: 12,552
Home colours	Away colours	Third colours

The 2001–02 VfL Bochum season was the 64th season in club history.

== Review and events ==
The VfL Bochum encountered some difficulties signing a new head coach. Bernard Dietz, the head coach of the clubs reserve team, took over as caretaker and served double duty until Peter Neururer was signed on 4 December 2001.

== Matches ==
=== Legend ===
Win Draw Loss

=== 2. Bundesliga ===
29 July 2001 1	SpVgg Unterhaching	0 – 2	VfL Bochum	Unterhaching
15:00			Colding 58'; Freier 74'	Stadium: Generali Sportpark; Attendance: 6,000; Referee: Knut Kircher (Rottenburg am Neckar)

4 August 2001 2	VfL Bochum	1 – 1	Karlsruher SC	Bochum
15:00	Schröder 7'		Fuchs 10'	Stadium: Ruhrstadion; Attendance: 16,217; Referee: Michael Weiner (Giesen)

10 August 2001 3	VfL Bochum	2 – 1	1. FSV Mainz 05	Bochum
19:00	Graulund 41', 44'		Thurk 7'	Stadium: Ruhrstadion; Attendance: 14,025; Referee: Peter Lange (Filderstadt)

19 August 2001 4	Hannover 96	2 – 0	VfL Bochum	Hannover
15:00	Keita 69'; Nehrbauer 90'			Stadium: Niedersachsenstadion; Attendance: 20,078; Referee: Günter Perl (Pullach)

9 September 2001 5	VfL Bochum	3 – 3	Rot-Weiß Oberhausen	Bochum
15:00	Fahrenhorst 10'; Christiansen 45', 81' (pen.)		Rietpietsch 9'; Obad 22'; Tiéku 62'	Stadium: Ruhrstadion; Attendance: 13,094; Referee: Christian Schößling (Leipzig)

14 September 2001 6	LR Ahlen	2 – 5	VfL Bochum	Ahlen
19:00	Hamann 5'; Schuster 42'		Colding 12'; Buckley 70', 87'; Schröder 75'; Bemben 90'	Stadium: Wersestadion; Attendance: 8,415; Referee: Matthias Anklam (Buchholz)

22 September 2001 7	VfL Bochum	4 – 1	SV Babelsberg 03	Bochum
15:00	Hashemian 4'; Christiansen 28', 66'; Buckley 56'		Efe 77'	Stadium: Ruhrstadion; Attendance: 10,773; Referee: Babak Rafati (Hannover)

28 September 2001 8	SSV Reutlingen 05	3 – 0	VfL Bochum	Reutlingen
19:00	Garcia 39'; Frommer 67'; Hoffmann 86'			Stadium: Stadion an der Kreuzeiche; Attendance: 6,730; Referee: Stefan Weber (Eisenach)

15 October 2001 9	VfL Bochum	1 – 1	SV Waldhof Mannheim	Bochum
20:15	Schindzielorz 15' (pen.)		Teber 10'	Stadium: Ruhrstadion; Attendance: 10,077; Referee: Peter Gagelmann (Bremen)

19 October 2001 10	1. FC Schweinfurt 05	3 – 3	VfL Bochum	Schweinfurt
19:00	Wirsching 13'; Sprećaković 41'; Melunović 50'		Toppmöller 59'; Fahrenhorst 72'; Bemben 81'	Stadium: Willy-Sachs-Stadion; Attendance: 8,125; Referee: Kai Voss (Großhansdorf)

28 October 2001 11	VfL Bochum	3 – 2	1. FC Saarbrücken	Bochum
15:00	Ristau 55', 89'; Schröder 87'		Laping 28'; Brnas 78'	Stadium: Ruhrstadion; Attendance: 9,808; Referee: Stefan Trautmann (Bodenwerder)

5 November 2001 12	Eintracht Frankfurt	1 – 0	VfL Bochum	Frankfurt am Main
20:15	Kryszałowicz 56'			Stadium: Waldstadion; Attendance: 13,675; Referee: Franz-Xaver Wack (Biberbach)

17 November 2001 13	VfL Bochum	0 – 0	Arminia Bielefeld	Bochum
15:00				Stadium: Ruhrstadion; Attendance: 13,244; Referee: Florian Meyer (Burgdorf)

23 November 2001 14	MSV Duisburg	0 – 1	VfL Bochum	Duisburg
19:00			Graulund 2'	Stadium: Wedaustadion; Attendance: 11,312; Referee: Edgar Steinborn (Sinzig)

30 November 2001 15	VfL Bochum	1 – 1	SpVgg Greuther Fürth	Bochum
19:00	Freier 43'		Ruman 35'	Stadium: Ruhrstadion; Attendance: 9,397; Referee: Torsten Koop (Lüttenmark)

7 December 2001 16	1. FC Union Berlin	1 – 0	VfL Bochum	Berlin
19:00	Fiél 41'			Stadium: Stadion An der Alten Försterei; Attendance: 7,240; Referee: André Stachowiak (Duisburg)

16 December 2001 17	VfL Bochum	5 – 3	Alemannia Aachen	Bochum
15:00	Buckley 1'; Hashemian 8', 54' (pen.); Meichelbeck 19'; Toplak 77'		Pflipsen 37'; Zernicke 65'; Xie 66'	Stadium: Ruhrstadion; Attendance: 10,993; Referee: Felix Brych (Munich)

19 December 2001 18	VfL Bochum	4 – 0	SpVgg Unterhaching	Bochum
19:00	Meichelbeck 14'; Wosz 31'; Freier 34'; Hashemian 85'			Stadium: Ruhrstadion; Attendance: 9,361; Referee: Dirk Margenberg (Wermelskirchen)

25 January 2002 19	Karlsruher SC	4 – 1	VfL Bochum	Karlsruhe
19:00	Fuchs 6'; Graf 37'; Melkam 55'; Heinzen 71'		Hashemian 77'	Stadium: Wildparkstadion; Attendance: 8,800; Referee: Uwe Kemmling (Kleinburgwedel)

3 February 2002 20	1. FSV Mainz 05	1 – 1	VfL Bochum	Mainz
15:00	Nkufo 69' (pen.)		Christiansen 64'	Stadium: Bruchwegstadion; Attendance: 11,300; Referee: Alfons Berg (Konz)

6 February 2002 21	VfL Bochum	4 – 2	Hannover 96	Bochum
19:00	Wosz 2', 83'; Christiansen 44'; Buckley 68'		Stendel 3'; Štefulj 27'	Stadium: Ruhrstadion; Attendance: 13,042; Referee: Mike Pickel (Mendig)

10 February 2002 22	Rot-Weiß Oberhausen	6 – 1	VfL Bochum	Oberhausen
15:00	Obad 2', 60'; Wojtala 18'; Lipinski 21' (pen.), 67'; Chiquinho 78'		Christiansen 48'	Stadium: Niederrheinstadion; Attendance: 7,276; Referee: Günter Perl (Pullach)

17 February 2002 23	VfL Bochum	3 – 1	LR Ahlen	Bochum
15:00	Wosz 17'; Christiansen 69' (pen.), 73'		Labak 89'	Stadium: Ruhrstadion; Attendance: 10,339; Referee: Volker Wezel (Tübingen)

24 February 2002 24	SV Babelsberg 03	1 – 2	VfL Bochum	Potsdam
13:30	Härtel 21'		Wosz 37'; Freier 70'	Stadium: Karl-Liebknecht-Stadion; Attendance: 3,640; Referee: Lutz Wagner (Kriftel)

20 March 2002 25	VfL Bochum	3 – 1	SSV Reutlingen 05	Bochum
19:00	Freier 27'; Buckley 39'; Hashemian 87'		Frommer 71'	Stadium: Ruhrstadion; Attendance: 11,017; Referee: Kai Voss (Großhansdorf)

8 March 2002 26	SV Waldhof Mannheim	1 – 2	VfL Bochum	Mannheim
19:00	Zinnow 22'		Christiansen 35'; Wosz 36'	Stadium: Carl-Benz-Stadion; Attendance: 5,100; Referee: Knut Kircher (Rottenburg am Neckar)

15 March 2002 27	VfL Bochum	3 – 1	1. FC Schweinfurt 05	Bochum
19:00	Reis 52', 87'; Hashemian 90'		Melunović 37' (pen.)	Stadium: Ruhrstadion; Attendance: 11,256; Referee: Peter Lange (Filderstadt)

24 March 2002 28	1. FC Saarbrücken	0 – 2	VfL Bochum	Saarbrücken
15:00			Christiansen 42'; Reis 51'	Stadium: Ludwigsparkstadion; Attendance: 2,000; Referee: Torsten Koop (Lüttenmark)

1 April 2002 29	VfL Bochum	3 – 0	Eintracht Frankfurt	Bochum
20:15	Ristau 3'; Christiansen 45' (pen.), 58'			Stadium: Ruhrstadion; Attendance: 17,506; Referee: Lutz Michael Fröhlich (Berlin)

7 April 2002 30	Arminia Bielefeld	3 – 0	VfL Bochum	Bielefeld
15:00	Kauf 36'; Hofschneider 77'; Albayrak 80' (pen.)			Stadium: Alm; Attendance: 26,601; Referee: Wolfgang Stark (Ergolding)

12 April 2002 31	VfL Bochum	3 – 0	MSV Duisburg	Bochum
19:00	Hashemian 58'; Christiansen 70', 85'			Stadium: Ruhrstadion; Attendance: 15,720; Referee: Peter Sippel (Munich)

19 April 2002 32	SpVgg Greuther Fürth	1 – 1	VfL Bochum	Fürth
19:00	Amanatidis 27'		Christiansen 45'	Stadium: Playmobil-Stadion; Attendance: 11,026; Referee: Florian Meyer (Burgdorf)

28 April 2002 33	VfL Bochum	2 – 1	1. FC Union Berlin	Bochum
15:00	Buckley 9'; Fahrenhorst 89'		Divić 17'	Stadium: Ruhrstadion; Attendance: 17,523; Referee: Jörg Keßler (Höhenkirchen)

5 May 2002 34	Alemannia Aachen	1 – 3	VfL Bochum	Aachen
15:00	Caillas 48'		Christiansen 28' (pen.); Freier 43', 86'	Stadium: Tivoli; Attendance: 16,631; Referee: Michael Weiner (Giesen)

=== DFB-Pokal ===
26 August 2001 R1	FC Schalke 04 II	0 – 1	VfL Bochum	Gelsenkirchen
15:00			Christiansen 64'	Stadium: Parkstadion; Attendance: 3,000; Referee: Dirk Margenberg (Wermelskirchen)

11 December 2001 R2	VfL Bochum	2 – 3	Bayer 04 Leverkusen	Bochum
19:00	Freier 28'; Colding 75'		Berbatov 27', 77', 90+1'	Stadium: Ruhrstadion; Attendance: 11,882; Referee: Wolfgang Stark (Ergolding)

== Squad ==
=== Squad and statistics ===
==== Squad, appearances and goals scored ====
No.	Pos	Nat	Player	Total		2. Bundesliga		DFB-Pokal	
No.	Pos	Nat	Player	Apps	Goals	Apps	Goals	Apps	Goals
1	GK	(Netherlands) NED	Rein van Duijnhoven	30	0	29	0	1	0
2	DF	(Croatia) CRO	Samir Toplak	18	1	17	1	1	0
3	DF	(Germany) GER	Martin Meichelbeck	18	2	17	2	1	0
4	DF	(Germany) GER	Mirko Dickhaut	28	0	26	0	2	0
5	DF	(Denmark) DEN	Søren Colding	29	3	27	2	2	1
6	MF	(Germany) GER	Matthias Lust (until 31 December 2001)	5	0	4	0	1	0
7	MF	(Germany) GER	Paul Freier	32	8	30	7	2	1
8	MF	(Germany) GER	Sebastian Schindzielorz	25	1	25	1	0	0
9	FW	(Spain) ESP	Thomas Christiansen	31	18	30	17	1	1
10	MF	(Germany) GER	Dariusz Wosz	29	6	27	6	2	0
11	FW	(Denmark) DEN	Peter Graulund	13	3	13	3	0	0
12	DF	(Germany) GER	Thomas Stickroth	6	0	5	0	1	0
13	GK	(Germany) GER	Christian Vander	6	0	5	0	1	0
14	MF	(Austria) AUT	Dietmar Berchtold	10	0	9	0	1	0
15	DF	(Germany) GER	Rouven Schröder	16	3	16	3	0	0
16	FW	(Iran) IRI	Vahid Hashemian	22	8	21	8	1	0
17	MF	(Germany) GER	Malek Barudi	0	0	0	0	0	0
18	FW	(Croatia) CRO	Marijo Marić (until 30 September 2001)	3	0	2	0	1	0
19	FW	(Germany) GER	Mike Busch	2	0	2	0	0	0
20	MF	(Russia) RUS	Sergei Mandreko	27	0	26	0	1	0
21	FW	(South Africa) RSA	Delron Buckley	33	7	31	7	2	0
22	DF	(Germany) GER	Thomas Reis	16	3	15	3	1	0
23	MF	(Germany) GER	Dino Toppmöller	13	1	12	1	1	0
24	DF	(Germany) GER	Michael Bemben	31	2	29	2	2	0
25	DF	(Germany) GER	Frank Fahrenhorst	28	3	26	3	2	0
26	MF	(Germany) GER	Björn Joppe	7	0	7	0	0	0
27	FW	(Germany) GER	Sascha Siebert (until 31 December 2001)	0	0	0	0	0	0
27	MF	(Germany) GER	Markus Ehrhard (since 3 February 2002)	4	0	4	0	0	0
28	DF	(Germany) GER	Hilko Ristau	20	3	19	3	1	0
29	DF	(Germany) GER	Axel Sundermann	0	0	0	0	0	0
30	GK	(Germany) GER	Sebastian Selke (since 1 January 2002)	0	0	0	0	0	0

=== Transfers ===
==== Summer ====
In:

No.	Pos.	Nation	Player
10	MF	GER	Dariusz Wosz (from Hertha BSC)
11	FW	DEN	Peter Graulund (from Brøndby IF)
14	MF	AUT	Dietmar Berchtold (from Alemannia Aachen)
16	FW	IRI	Vahid Hashemian (from Hamburger SV)
17	MF	GER	Malek Barudi (from TuS Celle FC)
19	FW	GER	Mike Busch (on loan from VfL Wolfsburg)
23	MF	GER	Dino Toppmöller (from Manchester City F.C.)

Out:

No.	Pos.	Nation	Player
5	DF	CRO	Damir Milinović (to HNK Rijeka)
7	MF	GER	Peter Peschel (to MSV Duisburg)
10	MF	TUR	Yıldıray Baştürk (to Bayer 04 Leverkusen)
14	MF	CRO	Ante Čović (to 1. FC Saarbrücken)
15	MF	GER	Olaf Schreiber (retired)
17	FW	POL	Henryk Bałuszyński (to LR Ahlen)
18	FW	CRO	Marijo Marić (to FC Kärnten)
19	FW	YUG	Zdravko Drinčić (to SV Waldhof Mannheim)
20	MF	CRO	Zoran Mamić (to SpVgg Greuther Fürth)
26	MF	GER	Mike Rietpietsch (to Rot-Weiß Oberhausen)

==== Winter ====
In:

No.	Pos.	Nation	Player
27	MF	GER	Markus Ehrhard (from VfL Bochum II)
30	GK	GER	Sebastian Selke (free agent)

Out:

No.	Pos.	Nation	Player
6	MF	GER	Matthias Lust (to SpVgg Unterhaching)
27	FW	GER	Sascha Siebert (to SC Paderborn 07)

== VfL Bochum II ==
No.	Pos	Nat	Player	Total		Oberliga Westfalen	
No.	Pos	Nat	Player	Apps	Goals	Apps	Goals
	MF	(Germany) GER	Malek Barudi	20	1	20	1
	MF	(Germany) GER	Emanuel Benner	4	0	4	0
	FW	(Germany) GER	Mike Busch	4	1	4	1
	MF	(Germany) GER	Markus Ehrhard	28	4	28	4
	MF	(Poland) POL	Arek Grad	25	6	25	6
	MF	(Germany) GER	Mike Grühn	17	3	17	3
	GK	(Bosnia and Herzegovina) BIH	Senad Hecimovic	2	0	2	0
	MF	(Germany) GER	Sascha Höhle	3	0	3	0
	MF	(Germany) GER	Björn Joppe	26	8	26	8
	FW	(Germany) GER	Seyfullah Kalayci	7	0	7	0
	DF	(Germany) GER	Christoph Keim	26	3	26	3
	DF	(Germany) GER	Sebastian Kroth	13	1	13	1
	MF	(Germany) GER	Sascha Lindner	21	1	21	1
	MF	(Germany) GER	Wojtek Meinert	7	0	7	0
	DF	(Germany) GER	Mirko Mustroph	28	2	28	2
	FW	(Germany) GER	Göktan Özdemir	1	0	1	0
	DF	(Turkey) TUR	Aykan Özer	24	0	24	0
	MF	(Spain) ESP	Angel Parla-Diaz	18	0	18	0
	DF	(Germany) GER	Florian Schäfer	1	0	1	0
	GK	(Germany) GER	Marco Schulz	24	0	24	0
	MF	(Germany) GER	Rainer Schümann	26	1	26	1
	DF	(Germany) GER	Tobias Seiler	16	0	16	0
	GK	(Germany) GER	Sebastian Selke (since 1 January 2002)	7	0	7	0
	FW	(Germany) GER	Sascha Siebert (until 31 December 2001)	18	7	18	7
	FW	(Germany) GER	Alexander Thamm	5	2	5	2
	MF	(Germany) GER	Dino Toppmöller	2	4	2	4
	GK	(Germany) GER	Christian Vander	1	0	1	0
	MF	(Italy) ITA	Luciano Velardi	31	8	31	8
	MF	(Germany) GER	Danny Woidtke	29	5	29	5
	MF	(Turkey) TUR	Engin Yavuzaslan	27	0	27	0
	MF	(Germany) GER	David Zajas	6	0	6	0
