= Michael Busch =

Michael Busch may refer to:

- Michael E. Busch (1947–2019), Speaker of the Maryland House of Delegates
- Michael P. Busch, hematologist
- Michael Busch (baseball) (born 1997), major league baseball player
- Michael Busch (runner), short-course winner at the 1997 German Cross Country Championships
- Mike Busch (baseball) (born 1968), former player with the Los Angeles Dodgers
- Mike Busch (footballer) (born 1981), German football forward
- Mike Busch (American football) (born 1962), retired American football player
