= Ehrhard =

Ehrhard is both a surname and a masculine given name, a variant of Erhard. People with the name include:

Surname:

- Albert Ehrhard (1862–1940), German Catholic theologian
- Ludwig Ehrhard (1897–1977), German politician
- Markus Ehrhard (1976), retired German football player

Given name:

- Ehrhard Schmidt (1863–1946), admirals of the Imperial German Navy
