= Venczel =

Venczel is a surname. Notable people with the surname include:

- Jozsef Venczel (born 1913), Hungarian sociologist, researcher, and writer
- Vera Venczel (born 1946), Hungarian actress
- Balázs Venczel (born 1986), Hungarian footballer

== See also ==
- Wenzel
- Wenczel
