= Melunović =

Melunović (Serbian Cyrillic: Мелуновић) is a Serbian surname. Notable people with the surname include:

- Alen Melunović (born 1990), Serbian footballer
- Elvir Melunović (born 1979), Swiss footballer
- Ermin Melunović (born 1973), former Serbian footballer
