= Sim Jae-won =

South Korean footballer (born 1977)

Sim Jae-won 심재원
Personal information
- Date of birth: 11 March 1977 (age 49)
- Place of birth: Daejeon, South Korea
- Height: 1.84 m (6 ft 0 in)
- Position: Right back

Youth career
- 1996–1999: Yonsei University

Senior career*
| Years | Team | Apps | (Gls) |
| 2000–2001 | Busan I'cons | 16 | (0) |
| 2001–2002 | → Eintracht Frankfurt | 19 | (0) |
| 2002–2008 | Busan I'Park | 81 | (1) |
| 2004–2005 | → Gwangju Sangmu (army) | 27 | (2) |
| 2009–2010 | Changsha Ginde | 24 | (1) |
| 2010 | Gangneung City | 10 | (0) |
| Total | | 177 | (4) |

International career^{‡}
| 1996–1997 | South Korea U-20 | 9 | (0) |
| 1999–2000 | South Korea U-23 | 18 | (0) |
| 1998–2002 | South Korea | 20 | (2) |
Korean name
| Hangul | 심재원 |
| Hanja | 沈載源 |
| RR | Sim Jaewon |
| MR | Sim Chaewŏn |
- * Club domestic league appearances and goals as of 2 November 2010 ‡ National team caps and goals as of 10 July 2008

Sim Jae-won (born 11 March 1977) is a South Korean former footballer.

His previous club was Busan I'Park, Gwangju Sangmu Bulsajo in South Korea and Eintracht Frankfurt in Germany and Changsha Ginde in China.

He has played in the 1997 FIFA World Youth Championship for the South Korea national team and at the 2000 Summer Olympics for the South Korea national team.

Sim has represented South Korea in senior team squads from 1998 to 2001. His A-match first goal was 5 April 2000, against Laos at Dongdaemun Stadium for Asian Cup first qualification match.

== Club career statistics ==
| Club performance | | | League | | Cup | | League Cup | | Continental | | Total | |
| Season | Club | League | Apps | Goals | Apps | Goals | Apps | Goals | Apps | Goals | Apps | Goals |
| South Korea | | | League | | KFA Cup | | League Cup | | Asia | | Total | |
|---|---|---|---|---|---|---|---|---|---|---|---|---|
| 2000 | Busan I'cons | K-League | 9 | 0 | ? | ? | 4 | 0 | — | | | |
| 2001 | Busan I'cons | K-League | 7 | 0 | ? | ? | 11 | 1 | — | | | |
| Germany | | | League | | DFB-Pokal | | Other | | Europe | | Total | |
| 2001–02 | Eintracht Frankfurt | 2. Fußball-Bundesliga | 19 | 0 | | | | | — | | | |
| South Korea | | | League | | KFA Cup | | League Cup | | Asia | | Total | |
| 2002 | Busan I'cons | K-League | 14 | 0 | ? | ? | 0 | 0 | — | | | |
| 2003 | Busan I'cons | K-League | 25 | 0 | 0 | 0 | — | | — | | 25 | 0 |
| 2004 | Gwangju Sangmu | K-League | 4 | 0 | 2 | 0 | 3 | 0 | — | | 9 | 0 |
| 2005 | Gwangju Sangmu | K-League | 23 | 2 | 0 | 0 | 6 | 0 | — | | 29 | 2 |
| 2006 | Busan I'Park | K-League | 19 | 1 | 2 | 0 | 9 | 0 | — | | 30 | 1 |
| 2007 | Busan I'Park | K-League | 19 | 0 | 3 | 2 | 6 | 0 | — | | 28 | 2 |
| 2008 | Busan I'Park | K-League | 4 | 0 | 0 | 0 | 3 | 0 | — | | 7 | 0 |
| China PR | | | League | | FA Cup | | CSL Cup | | Asia | | Total | |
| 2009 | Changsha Ginde | Chinese Super League | 24 | 1 | — | | — | | — | | 24 | 1 |
| Total | South Korea | | 124 | 3 | | | 42 | 1 | — | | | |
| Total | Germany | | 19 | 0 | | | | | — | | | |
| Total | China PR | | 24 | 1 | | | | | — | | 24 | 1 |
| Career total | | | 167 | 4 | | | | | | | | |

== International goals ==
Results list South Korea's goal tally first.

| Date | Venue | Opponent | Score | Result | Competition |
|---|---|---|---|---|---|
| 5 April 2000 | Seoul, South Korea | Laos | 1 goal | 9-0 | 2000 AFC Asian Cup qualification |
| 7 October 2000 | Dubai, UAE | Australia | 1 goal | 4-2 | 2000 LG Cup |
