= Mathias Surmann =

German footballer

Personal information
- Date of birth: 19 December 1974 (age 51)
- Place of birth: Thuine, West Germany
- Height: 1.74 m (5 ft 9 in)
- Position: Midfielder

Youth career
- 1981–1989: SG Freren
- 1989–1993: Olympia Laxten

Senior career*
Years	Team	Apps	(Gls)
1993–1997	Olympia Laxten		
1997–1998	SV Meppen	18	(1)
1998–2006	Greuther Fürth	174	(9)
2006–2009	VfL Osnabrück	49	(3)
- * Club domestic league appearances and goals

Mathias Surmann (born 19 December 1974) is a German former professional footballer who played as a midfielder.

== Career ==
Surmann was born in Thuine. made his debut on the professional league level in the 2. Bundesliga for SV Meppen on 1 August 1997 when he came on as a substitute in the 79th minute in a game against Fortuna Köln.
