= Jens Rasiejewski =

German footballer (born 1975)

Personal information
- Date of birth: 1 January 1975 (age 51)
- Place of birth: Marburg, West Germany
- Height: 1.74 m (5 ft 9 in)
- Position: Defender

Youth career
- SV Erfurtshausen
- –1993: VfB Marburg

Senior career*
Years	Team	Apps	(Gls)
1993–1996	FSV Frankfurt		
1996–1999	Hannover 96	95	(8)
1999–2002	Eintracht Frankfurt	57	(1)
2002–2003	FC St. Pauli	26	(1)
2003–2005	VfB Stuttgart II	7	(0)

International career
1991	Germany U-17	3	(0)
1993–1997	Germany U-21	6	(0)
2000	Germany B	2	(0)

Managerial career
- 2008–2009: Hannover 96 (sports coordinator)
- 2011–2015: 1899 Hoffenheim (U17)
- 2015–2017: VfL Bochum (head of youth)
- 2016: VfL Bochum (assistant)
- 2017: VfL Bochum (U19)
- 2017–2018: VfL Bochum
- 2021–2023: 1899 Hoffenheim (head of youth)
- * Club domestic league appearances and goals

Jens Rasiejewski (born 1 January 1975) is a German football manager and former player who last managed VfL Bochum.

== Career ==
Rasiejewski made his debut on the professional league level in the 2. Bundesliga for FSV Frankfurt on 1 October 1994 when he came on as a half-time substitute in a game against SV Meppen.

== Coaching career ==
From 2005 to 2008, Rasiejewski studied sports management in Düsseldorf and also obtained his DFB A coaching license. As part of his studies to become a sports manager, he spent around a year as an intern at Hannover 96, where he worked as sports coordinator at his old club from April 2008 and supported the work of sports director Christian Hochstätter.

From July 2011 to June 2015, Rasiejewski coached the TSG 1899 Hoffenheim U-17 team as the successor to Xaver Zembrod.

On 15 June 2015, it was announced that Rasiejewski would become head of the sports and youth development department at VfL Bochum, succeeding Alexander Richter, who would focus more on squad management and the certification of the youth development center. In Bochum, he once again worked together with sports director Christian Hochstätter.

From January 2016, Rasiejewski was part of the Bochum professional team's coaching team as an additional assistant coach. He did so for just over a year before he was no longer part of the coaching staff and continued in his role as the head of the youth sector; a role he had been doing on the side.

In the summer of 2017, he became coach of the club's U19 team, while still fulfilling his role as head of the club's academy. However, that didn't last long. In October 2017, Rasiejewski became interim head coach of VfL Bochum, succeeding Ismail Atalan, and was finally given a contract as head coach until June 30, 2019 on December 8, 2017. After four consecutive defeats, Rasiejewski was relieved of his duties on February 7, 2018, as was Chief Sports Officer Hochstätter.

Rasiejewski returned to Hoffenheim in June 2021 and took over as head of the Hoffenheim youth academy as the successor to Marcus Mann. He was released from his duties at Hoffenheim in December 2023.

== Career statistics ==
Appearances and goals by club, season and competition
Club	Season	League			DFB-Pokal		Other^{1 2}		Total	
Club	Season	Division	Apps	Goals	Apps	Goals	Apps	Goals	Apps	Goals
FSV Frankfurt	1993–94	Oberliga Hessen			—		(Note: Appearances in Oberliga promotion playoffs)			
FSV Frankfurt	1994–95	2. Bundesliga	23	0	—		—		23	0
FSV Frankfurt	1995–96	Regionalliga Süd	25	1	1	0	—		26	1
FSV Frankfurt	Total				1	0				
Hannover 96	1996–97	Regionalliga Nord	30	1	2	0	2 (Note: Appearances in Regionalliga promotion playoffs)	0	34	1
Hannover 96	1997–98	Regionalliga Nord	31	6	2	1	2	0	35	7
Hannover 96	1998–99	2. Bundesliga	34	1	1	0	—		35	1
Hannover 96	Total		95	8	5	1	4	0	104	9
Eintracht Frankfurt	1999–00	Bundesliga	21	0	1	0	—		22	0
Eintracht Frankfurt	2000–01	Bundesliga	12	0	1	0	—		13	0
Eintracht Frankfurt	2001–02	2. Bundesliga	24	1	3	0	—		27	1
Eintracht Frankfurt	Total		57	1	5	0	0	0	52	1
FC St. Pauli	2002–03	2. Bundesliga	26	1	0	0	—		26	1
VfB Stuttgart II	2003–04	Regionalliga Süd	7	0	—		—		7	0
VfB Stuttgart II	2004–05	Regionalliga Süd	0	0	—		—		0	0
VfB Stuttgart II	Total		7	0	0	0	0	0	7	0
Career total					11	1				
