= Giovanni Speranza =

German-Italian footballer

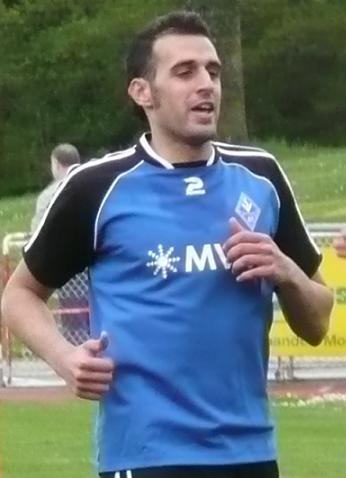
- Speranza in 2008.

Personal information
- Full name: Giovanni Speranza
- Date of birth: 6 March 1982 (age 44)
- Place of birth: Giessen, West Germany
- Height: 1.80 m (5 ft 11 in)
- Position: Midfielder

Senior career*
Years	Team	Apps	(Gls)
2001–2005	Eintracht Frankfurt	2	(0)
2005–2006	Slavia Sofia	25	(1)
2006–2007	Monza Brianza	11	(0)
2007–2009	Waldhof Mannheim	42	(9)
2009	Dunajská Streda	13	(0)
2011	The Vissai Ninh Bình	8	(0)
2012	Kienlongbank Kiên Giang	14	(2)
2013	Đắk Lắk		
2014	The Vissai Ninh Bình (loan)		

International career
- Italy (futsal)
- * Club domestic league appearances and goals as of 1 May 2012

Giovanni Speranza (born 6 March 1982 in Giessen) is a German-Italian footballer.
