= Sebastian Selke =

German footballer

Personal information
- Date of birth: 22 February 1974 (age 52)
- Height: 1.90 m (6 ft 3 in)
- Position: Goalkeeper

Youth career
- –1992: SC 09 Uelzen
- 1992–1994: Lüneburger SK

Senior career*
Years	Team	Apps	(Gls)
1994–1997	Lüneburger SK	89	(0)
1997–2000	1. FC Köln	4	(0)
2000–2001	KFC Uerdingen 05	14	(0)
2002	VfL Bochum II	7	(0)
2002–2005	KFC Uerdingen 05	29	(0)
2005–2006	Schwarz-Weiß Essen		
2006–2007	SSVg Velbert		
2007–2008	KFC Uerdingen 05		

Managerial career
- 2009–: FC Vaduz (Goalkeeping coach)
- 2012: FC Vaduz (Interim coach)
- * Club domestic league appearances and goals

Sebastian Selke (born 22 February 1974) is a German former professional footballer who played as a goalkeeper.
