= Michael P. Busch =

American physician

Michael P. Busch is a physician specializing in blood-borne pathogens. He has developed screening tests to prevent HIV and West Nile virus infections from blood transfusions.

Busch is a professor of laboratory medicine at the University of California, San Francisco and director of the Blood Systems Research Institute. He received his undergraduate education at the University of California, Santa Barbara and his medical training at University of Southern California.

Busch has two children.
