= Torsten Kracht =

German footballer

- Kracht in 1986

Personal information
- Full name: Torsten Kracht
- Date of birth: 4 October 1967 (age 59)
- Place of birth: Grimma, East Germany
- Height: 1.83 m (6 ft 0 in)
- Position: Defender

Youth career
- –1979: BSG Lokomotive Naunhof
- 1979–1984: 1. FC Lokomotive Leipzig

Senior career*
Years	Team	Apps	(Gls)
1984–1991	1. FC Lokomotive Leipzig	109	(6)
1991–1993	VfB Leipzig	74	(6)
1993–1994	VfB Stuttgart	13	(0)
1994–1995	VfB Leipzig	39	(3)
1995–1999	VfL Bochum	116	(8)
1999–2001	Eintracht Frankfurt	64	(2)
2001–2003	Karlsruher SC	60	(2)
2003–2004	VfB Leipzig	16	(0)
Total		491	(28)

International career
1988–1990	East Germany	2	(0)
Medal record
Lokomotive Leipzig
Third place	DDR-Oberliga	1984–85
Runner-up	DDR-Oberliga	1985–86
Winner	FDGB-Pokal	1985–86
Third place	DDR-Oberliga	1986–87
Winner	FDGB-Pokal	1986–87
Runner-up	UEFA Cup Winners' Cup	1986–87
Runner-up	DDR-Oberliga	1987–88
VfB Leipzig
Third place	2. Bundesliga	1992–93
VfL Bochum
Winner	2. Bundesliga	1995–96
- * Club domestic league appearances and goals

Torsten Kracht (born 4 October 1967) is a retired East German and German football player.

== Career ==
The defender made in total over 275 appearances East German and German top-flights. Kracht has collected two caps for East Germany. With 12 red and yellow/red cards, he is the most sent-off player in Bundesliga history.

=== Statistics ===
Club performance			League		Cup		League Cup		Continental		Total	
Season	Club	League	Apps	Goals	Apps	Goals	Apps	Goals	Apps	Goals	Apps	Goals
East Germany			League		FDGB-Pokal		League Cup		Europe		Total	
1984–85	Lokomotive Leipzig	DDR-Oberliga	2	0			—		0	0		
1985–86	Lokomotive Leipzig	DDR-Oberliga	18	1			—		1	0		
1986–87	Lokomotive Leipzig	DDR-Oberliga	4	0			—		0	0		
1987–88	Lokomotive Leipzig	DDR-Oberliga	24	2			—		2	0		
1988–89	Lokomotive Leipzig	DDR-Oberliga	19	1			—		4	0		
1989–90	Lokomotive Leipzig	DDR-Oberliga	16	1			—		—			
1990–91	Lokomotive Leipzig	NOFV-Oberliga	26	1			—		—			
Germany			League		DFB-Pokal		DFB-Ligapokal		Europe		Total	
1991–92	VfB Leipzig	2. Bundesliga	31	3	3	0	—		—		34	3
1992–93	VfB Leipzig	2. Bundesliga	43	3	2	0	—		—		45	3
1993–94	VfB Stuttgart	Bundesliga	13	0	1	0	—		—		14	0
1993–94	VfB Leipzig	Bundesliga	7	0	0	0	—		—		7	0
1994–95	VfB Leipzig	2. Bundesliga	32	3	1	1	—		—		33	4
1995–96	VfL Bochum	2. Bundesliga	33	5	0	0	—		—		33	5
1996–97	VfL Bochum	Bundesliga	29	2	4	1	—		—		33	3
1997–98	VfL Bochum	Bundesliga	28	0	2	1	1	0	6	0	37	1
1998–99	VfL Bochum	Bundesliga	26	1	2	0	—		—		28	1
1999–00	Eintracht Frankfurt	Bundesliga	32	1	2	1	—		—		34	2
2000–01	Eintracht Frankfurt	Bundesliga	32	1	1	0	—		—		33	1
2001–02	Karlsruher SC	2. Bundesliga	31	2	1	0	—		—		32	2
2002–03	Karlsruher SC	2. Bundesliga	29	0	0	0	—		—		29	0
2003–04	VfB Leipzig	NOFV-Oberliga	16	0	—		—		—		16	0
Total	East Germany		109	6			0	0	7	0		
Total	Germany		382	22	19	4	1	0	6	0	408	26
Career total			491	28			1	0	13	0		
