= Stephen Famewo =

Nigerian-German footballer

Personal information
- Full name: Stephen Kanu Famewo
- Date of birth: 30 December 1983 (age 42)
- Place of birth: Effurun, Nigeria
- Height: 1.85 m (6 ft 1 in)
- Positions: Midfielder; forward

Youth career
- Dynamos Lagos
- Louhans-Cuiseaux
- –2001: Eintracht Frankfurt

Senior career*
Years	Team	Apps	(Gls)
2001–2003	Eintracht Frankfurt (A)		
2001–2003	Eintracht Frankfurt	3	(1)
2003–2006	VfB Stuttgart (A)	52	(3)
2006–2007	SV Wehen	2	(0)
2007	SV Wilhelmshaven	14	(4)
2007–2009	Holstein Kiel	19	(3)
2009–2010	Kickers Emden		
2010–2011	SV Meppen		
2011	FC Homburg		
2014–2016	Heeslinger SC		
- * Club domestic league appearances and goals

Stephen Famewo (born 30 December 1983) is a Nigerian-German former professional footballer who played as a midfielder or forward.
