= Ralf Schmitt =

German footballer

Personal information
- Date of birth: January 21, 1977 (age 49)
- Place of birth: Speyer, West Germany
- Height: 1.94 m (6 ft 4 in)
- Position: Striker

Youth career
- VfR Speyer
- –2000: FV Speyer

Senior career*
Years	Team	Apps	(Gls)
2000–2002	Eintracht Frankfurt	1	(0)
2002–2003	Wormatia Worms	26	(19)
2003–2004	Karlsruher SC	15	(1)
2004	FC Nöttingen	15	(7)
2005	Sportfreunde Siegen	14	(2)
2006–2008	TSV 1860 München II	55	(11)
- * Club domestic league appearances and goals

Ralf Schmitt (born January 21, 1977, in Speyer) is a German former footballer. He made his debut on the professional league level in the Bundesliga for Eintracht Frankfurt on April 14, 2001, when he came on as a substitute in the 87th minute in a game against 1. FC Kaiserslautern.
