= Mike Busch (footballer) =

German footballer (born 1981)

Personal information
- Full name: Mike Busch
- Date of birth: 5 April 1981 (age 45)
- Height: 1.85 m (6 ft 1 in)
- Position: Forward

Youth career
- –2000: Hannover 96

Senior career*
Years	Team	Apps	(Gls)
2000–2003	VfL Wolfsburg	0	(0)
2000–2003	→ VfL Wolfsburg II		
2001–2002	→ VfL Bochum (loan)	2	(0)
2001–2002	→ VfL Bochum II (loan)	4	(1)
2003	SG Egelsbach		
2003–2005	SV Kickers Vahrenheide		
2005–2009	TuS Kleefeld		
2009–2011	Stern Misburg		
2011	FC Mozaik Spor		
2011–2012	TV Badenstedt		
- * Club domestic league appearances and goals

Mike Busch (born 5 April 1981) is a German football forward.
