= Chiquinho (footballer, born 1974) =

Brazilian footballer

Personal information
- Full name: Alexandre da Silva
- Date of birth: 21 March 1974 (age 52)
- Place of birth: Campinas, Brazil
- Height: 1.78 m (5 ft 10 in)
- Position: Midfielder

Senior career*
Years	Team	Apps	(Gls)
1997–2000	Borussia Mönchengladbach	36	(5)
2000–2002	Rot-Weiß Oberhausen	41	(7)
2002–2004	Rot Weiss Ahlen	45	(3)
2004–2005	Rot-Weiß Oberhausen	17	(0)
2005–2009	Austria Kärnten	87	(10)
Total		226	(25)
- * Club domestic league appearances and goals

Alexandre da Silva (born 21 March 1974), better known by his nickname Chiquinho, is a Brazilian former professional footballer who played as a midfielder.

== Career ==
Chiquinho was born in Campinas, São Paulo, Brazil. He began his football career at local team União São João de Araras and was, in 1997, on the brink of sealing a transfer to German Bundesliga club Borussia Dortmund, after Dortmund was alerted to the player's talents by their former Brazil international Júlio César. This transfer did not work out as fellow Bundesliga side Borussia Mönchengladbach rushed through an agreement with União São João to sign the player on a three-year contract for 2.2 million DEM. Chiquinho became the first ever player from Brazil to play for the former UEFA Cup winner.

Originally played as left sided wing back by Mönchengladbach's managers (and subsequently labelled as a surplus), Chiquinho was just as unable to meet expectations when he was given some share of playing-time in midfield under then manager Hans Meyer. This resulted in Mönchengladbach's decision not to extend his deal and forced the player to join Rot-Weiß Oberhausen. He played for Oberhausen in between 2000 and 2002, after which he was transferred to Rot Weiss Ahlen. At Ahlen he spent another two years of his career before moving back to Oberhausen in 2004. However, this time he only spent one season there. In 2005, he moved to FC Superfund. In his first year at FC Superfund, Chiquinho played in 29 games and scored two goals. Between 2007 and 2009 he was contracted for Austrian Bundesliga side SK Austria Kärnten.

== Career statistics ==
Appearances and goals by club, season and competition
Club	Season	League		
Club	Season	Division	Apps	Goals
Borussia Mönchengladbach	1997–98	Bundesliga	17	1
Borussia Mönchengladbach	1998–99	Bundesliga	7	1
Borussia Mönchengladbach	1999–00	2. Bundesliga	12	3
Borussia Mönchengladbach	Total		36	5
Rot-Weiß Oberhausen	2000–01	2. Bundesliga	18	0
Rot-Weiß Oberhausen	2001–02	2. Bundesliga	23	7
Rot-Weiß Oberhausen	Total		41	7
Rot Weiss Ahlen	2002–03	2. Bundesliga	22	1
Rot Weiss Ahlen	2003–04	2. Bundesliga	23	2
Rot Weiss Ahlen	Total		45	3
Rot-Weiß Oberhausen	2004–05	2. Bundesliga	17	0
FC Superfund / Austria Kärnten	2005–06	Austrian Bundesliga	30	3
FC Superfund / Austria Kärnten	2006–07	Austrian Bundesliga	30	2
FC Superfund / Austria Kärnten	2007–08	Austrian Bundesliga	14	1
FC Superfund / Austria Kärnten	2008–09	Austrian Bundesliga	13	4
FC Superfund / Austria Kärnten	Total		87	10
Career total			226	25
