= Michael Wenczel =

German-Hungarian footballer

Personal information
- Date of birth: 23 November 1977 (age 48)
- Place of birth: Heilbronn, West Germany
- Height: 1.91 m (6 ft 3 in)
- Position: Defender

Youth career
- VfR Heilbronn

Senior career*
| Years | Team | Apps | (Gls) |
| 1997–1998 | VfR Heilbronn | 23 | (0) |
| 1998–1999 | FV Lauda | 29 | (1) |
| 1999–2001 | VfR Mannheim | 60 | (11) |
| 2001–2003 | Eintracht Frankfurt | 6 | (0) |
| 2001–2003 | Eintracht Frankfurt II | 27 | (2) |
| 2003–2005 | FC Augsburg | 52 | (7) |
| 2005–2011 | FC Ingolstadt 04 | 123 | (16) |
| 2005–2011 | FC Ingolstadt 04 II | | |
- * Club domestic league appearances and goals

Michael Wenczel (born 23 November 1977 in Heilbronn) is a German former professional footballer who played as a defender. He also holds Hungarian citizenship.
