= Vladimir Maljković =

Croatian footballer

Personal information
- Date of birth: 14 August 1982 (age 44)
- Height: 1.91 m (6 ft 3 in)
- Position: Defender

Youth career
- Croatia Sesvete

Senior career*
Years	Team	Apps	(Gls)
–1999	NK Zagreb		
1999–2003	Eintracht Frankfurt II	23	(0)
2000–2001	Eintracht Frankfurt	3	(0)
2003–2005	Croatia Sesvete		
Total		26	(0)
- * Club domestic league appearances and goals

Vladimir Maljković (born 14 August 1982) is a Croatian retired footballer who played as a defender.

== Career ==
Maljković made his debut on the professional league level in the Bundesliga for Eintracht Frankfurt on 12 December 2000 when he started in a game against VfB Stuttgart, he scored an own goal in that game. He also played for their reserves.
