= Tommy Berntsen =

Norwegian footballer and manager (born 1973)

Personal information
- Date of birth: 18 December 1973 (age 52)
- Place of birth: Lørenskog, Norway
- Height: 1.88 m (6 ft 2 in)
- Position: Defender

Youth career
- Vålerenga

Senior career*
Years	Team	Apps	(Gls)
1991–1993	Vålerenga	1	(0)
1994–1995	Lørenskog		
1996–1997	Skjetten		
1998–2000	Lillestrøm	72	(17)
1999	→ Portsmouth (loan)	2	(0)
2001	Eintracht Frankfurt	3	(0)
2002–2009	Lyn	151	(9)
Total		229	(26)

International career
2002–2004	Norway	2	(0)

Managerial career
- 2003: Lyn
- 2014: Ullensaker/Kisa
- * Club domestic league appearances and goals

Tommy Berntsen (born 18 December 1973) is a Norwegian former professional footballer who played as a defender. He played the majority of his career at Lillestrøm S.K. and Lyn in the Norwegian Premier League.

Since 2010, Berntsen is involved with a youth coach role at Lyn.

== Club career ==
Berntsen began his playing career at Vålerenga, but failed to make the first team. He spent the next few years in the lower divisions, playing for local clubs Lørenskog IF and Skjetten SK. His breakthrough came in 1998 when he signed for Lillestrøm, where he and his teammate Torgeir Bjarmann made up one of the best central defences in the Norwegian Tippeligaen (Premier Division).

In January 2001, Berntsen left Norway for Germany and Eintracht Frankfurt. His stay, however, was not a success and he only played three matches for the first team. He returned to Norway for a fresh start in December 2001 and was signed by Lyn, where he played since. He acted briefly as a player-coach of the team in 2003. Together with Steven Lustü he once again formed part of a formidable defense. In the 2005 season, no club conceded fewer goals than Lyn. Berntsen has struggled with injuries over several periods, but always remained the captain and featured regularly in the Lyn side the last seasons of his career.

== International career ==
Berntsen was capped twice for the Norwegian national team. He last appeared in a friendly against Singapore in 2004.
