= Markus Lösch =

German footballer

Personal information
- Date of birth: 26 September 1971 (age 55)
- Place of birth: Stuttgart, West Germany
- Height: 1.80 m (5 ft 11 in)
- Position: Midfielder

Youth career
- TSV Schmiden
- SV Fellbach

Senior career*
Years	Team	Apps	(Gls)
–1993	Stuttgarter Kickers II		
1993–1996	TSF Ditzingen		
1996–1998	Stuttgarter Kickers	56	(2)
1998–2000	1. FC Nürnberg	47	(0)
2000–2001	Eintracht Frankfurt	15	(0)
2002	Stuttgarter Kickers	12	(1)
2002–2004	SV Eintracht Trier 05	56	(1)
2004–2005	Fortuna Düsseldorf	20	(0)
2005–2006	SV Eintracht Trier 05	29	(0)
2006–2008	SSV Ulm 1846	45	(1)
- * Club domestic league appearances and goals

Markus Lösch (born 26 September 1971 in Stuttgart) is a retired German football player. He made his debut on the professional league level in the 2. Bundesliga for Stuttgarter Kickers on 14 September 1996 when he came on as a half-time substitute in a game against SV Waldhof Mannheim.
