= Rolf-Christel Guié-Mien =

Congolese footballer

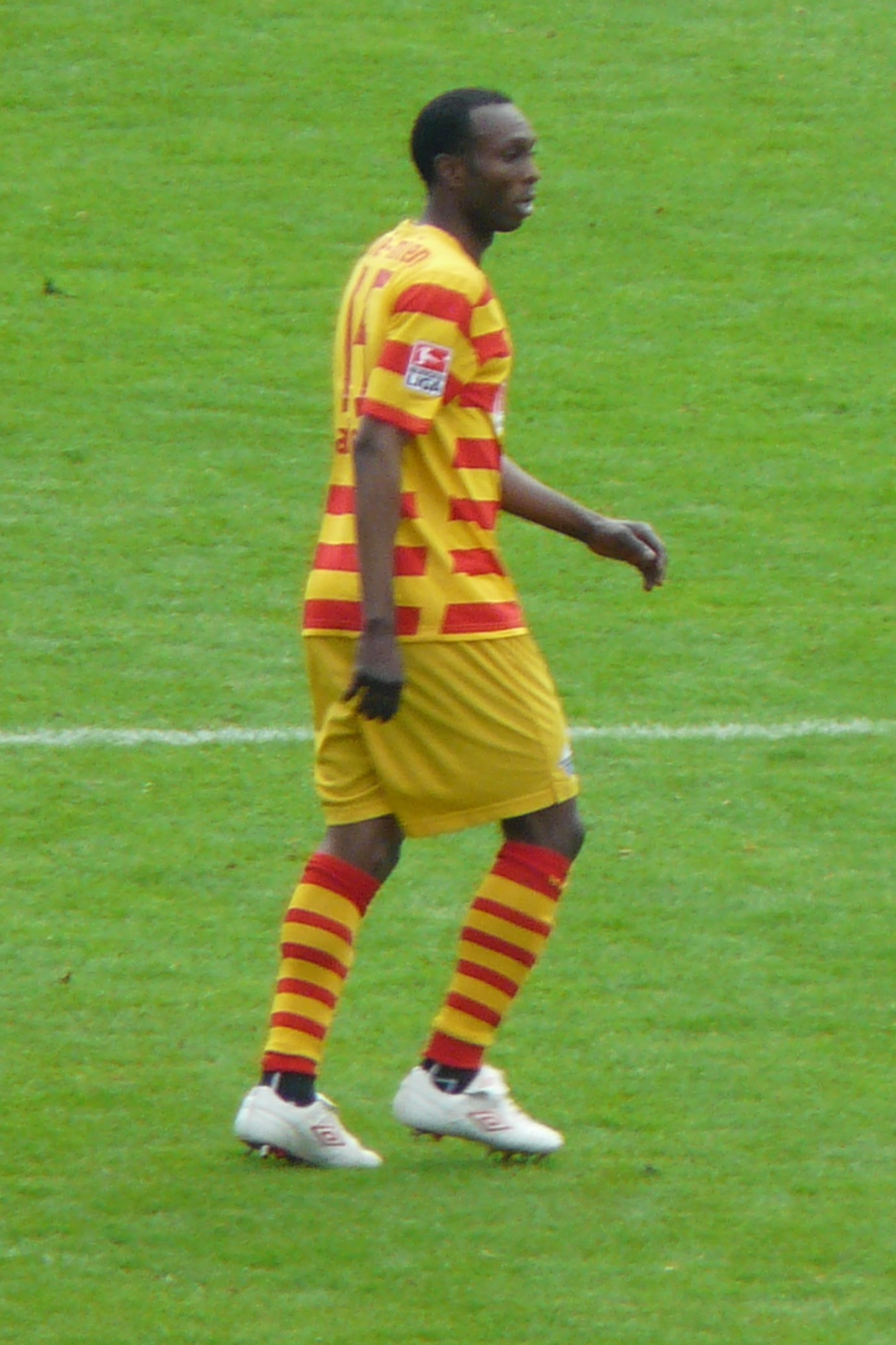
- Guié-Mien with SC Paderborn in May 2010

Personal information
- Date of birth: 28 October 1977 (age 49)
- Place of birth: Brazzaville, People's Republic of the Congo
- Height: 1.77 m (5 ft 10 in)
- Position: Midfielder

Youth career
- 1992–1995: Inter Brazzaville

Senior career*
Years	Team	Apps	(Gls)
1995–1997	Inter Brazzaville		
1997–1999	Karlsruher SC	41	(7)
1999–2002	Eintracht Frankfurt	95	(19)
2003–2004	SC Freiburg	25	(0)
2004–2006	1. FC Köln	27	(0)
2006–2007	FC Sachsen Leipzig	21	(4)
2007–2008	Rot-Weiss Essen	31	(9)
2008–2012	SC Paderborn	98	(3)
Total		338	(42)

International career
1996–2008	Congo	25	(5)
- * Club domestic league appearances and goals

Rolf-Christel Guié-Mien (born 28 October 1977) is a Congolese former professional footballer who played as a midfielder.

== Club career ==
Born in Brazzaville, Guié-Mien began his career at top-division AS Inter Brazzaville in the Congolese capital. At the age of 19, during the 1997–98 season, he moved to Germany to play for Karlsruher SC in the Bundesliga. By around halfway into the season he had made himself a regular starter through his playing skills as an attacking midfielder and forward. However he could not prevent the team being relegated into the 2. Bundesliga.

In the 1998–99 season he confirmed his initial promise and was ever-present as a key member of the team. However they narrowly missed out on promotion back into the Bundesliga.

Guié-Mien was then approached by Bundesliga side Eintracht Frankfurt and agreed to join them before the start of 1999–2000. Here too he quickly became central to the team's plans, but again, after survival in his first year, the club dropped into the second division the following season.

Frankfurt failed to come straight back up in 2001–02, and after a very successful start to the following season, with his best goal tally before the winter break to date, Guié-Mien moved to promotion-challengers SC Freiburg. In the event both teams were promoted that season. His spell at Freiburg, lasting until the end of 2003–04, was disappointing. He made just 25 appearances, many as a substitute lasting only a few minutes.

His next move was to 1. FC Köln, just relegated from the Bundesliga. There he was again unable to play himself into the starting eleven, achieving only the status of a squad player, and sometimes found himself playing for the amateur side in the Regionalliga. After his move to Freiburg, his continuing skillful play stood in stark contrast to his inability to score goals. Up to the end of 2004–05 he failed to score in 50 consecutive league matches.

His contract at Köln ran until the end of the 2005–06 season. However, after the appointment of Hanspeter Latour as manager, the club decided to release him early, and put him up for free transfer immediately after the 2005–06 winter break training. In September 2006 Guié-Mien signed for Oberliga side FC Sachsen Leipzig, where he played for one season. In summer 2007 he was contracted to Rot-Weiss Essen in the Regionalliga and signed one year later on 5 June 2008 with SC Paderborn 07. He retired when his contract ran out at the end of the 2011–12 season.

== International career ==
Guié-Mien played 26 matches for the Congo national team.

Scores and results list Congo's goal tally first, score column indicates score after each Guié-Mien goal.

List of international goals scored by Rolf-Christel Guié-Mien
No.	Date	Venue	Opponent	Score	Result	Competition	Ref.
1	20 June 1999	Stade Municipal, Pointe-Noire, Republic of the Congo	Namibia	3-0	3-0	2000 African Cup of Nations qualification	
2	3 September 2000	Stade Municipal, Pointe-Noire, Republic of the Congo	South Africa	1-2	1-2	2002 African Cup of Nations qualification	
3	8 October 2000	Stade George V, Curepipe, Mauritius	Mauritius	1-0	2-1	2002 African Cup of Nations qualification	
4	13 October 2002	Estádio do Maxaquene, Maputo, Mozambique	Mozambique	2-0	3-0	2004 African Cup of Nations qualification	
5	16 November 2011	Siaka Stevens National Stadium, Freetown, Sierra Leone	Sierra Leone	1-1	1-1	2006 FIFA World Cup qualification	
