= Karel Rada =

Czech footballer (born 1971)

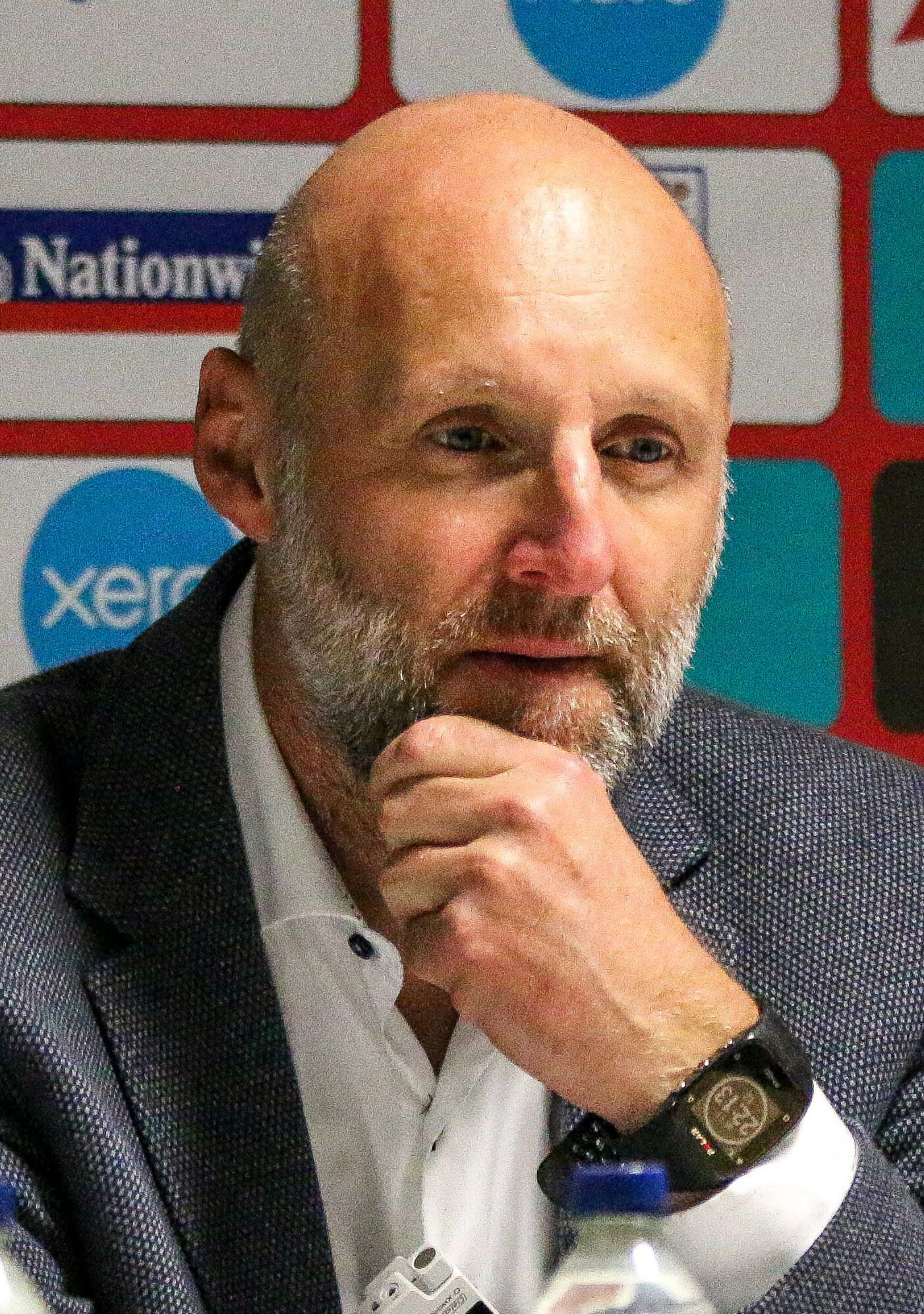
- Rada in 2022

Personal information
- Date of birth: 2 March 1971 (age 55)
- Place of birth: Karlovy Vary, Czechoslovakia
- Height: 1.87 m (6 ft 2 in)
- Position: Defender

Team information
- Current team: Viktoria Plzeň (women's football director)

Youth career
- 1977–1983: Sokol Stráž u Tachova
- 1983–1985: UD Tachov
- 1985–1990: Škoda Plzeň

Senior career*
Years	Team	Apps	(Gls)
1990–1994	Dukla Prague	67	(6)
1994–1997	Sigma Olomouc	86	(14)
1997–1998	Trabzonspor	41	(1)
1999–2000	Slavia Prague	56	(1)
2001–2002	Eintracht Frankfurt	38	(1)
2002–2006	Teplice	109	(6)
2006–2008	Bohemians 1905	43	(0)
Total		440	(29)

International career
1995–2001	Czech Republic	43	(4)

Managerial career
- Viktoria Plzeň U-19 women
- 2014–2017: Viktoria Plzeň women
- Czech Republic U-17 women
- 2017–2024: Czech Republic women
- 2025–: Viktoria Plzeň (women's football director)
Medal record
Men's football
Representing Czech Republic
UEFA European Championship
Runner-up	1996 England
FIFA Confederations Cup
Third place	1997 Saudi Arabia
- * Club domestic league appearances and goals

Karel Rada (born 2 March 1971) is a Czech former professional footballer who played as a defender. He played Dukla Prague, Slavia Prague, Sigma Olomouc, Teplice, Trabzonspor and Eintracht Frankfurt. At international level, Rada played for the Czech Republic, for which he played 43 matches and scored four goals.

== Career ==
Rada started his career with Dukla Prague. He played in the Czechoslovak First League from 1990, through its transition into the Czech First League in 1993 until 1997, when he moved abroad to play for Turkish club Trabzonspor in the Süper Lig. He finished his professional career in 2008 after Bohemians 1905 were relegated from the Czech First League. Rada was a participant in the UEFA Euro 1996, where the Czech Republic won the silver medal, and represented the country at the 1997 FIFA Confederations Cup. He scored a penalty shootout in a victory against France during the former tournament.

Rada was appointed coach of the Czech Republic women's national football team in February 2017, but resigned on 3 December 2024 after a loss against Portugal.

On 7 May 2025, Rada was appointed women's football director of Viktoria Plzeň.

== Personal life ==
Following his football career, Rada returned to West Bohemia, where he ran a pension, as well as training youth teams of FC Viktoria Plzeň. Rada is married to a woman named Vlaďka, with whom he has twin daughters named Adéla and Eliška.
