= Peter Deißenberger =

German footballer

Personal information
- Date of birth: 1 December 1976 (age 49)
- Place of birth: Würzburg, West Germany
- Height: 1.76 m (5 ft 9 in)
- Position: Midfielder

Senior career*
Years	Team	Apps	(Gls)
2000–2001	Eintracht Frankfurt	1	(0)
2000–2003	Eintracht Frankfurt II		
2003–2006	SV Elversberg	65	(6)
2006–2008	Würzburger FV		
2008–2010	SV Bütthard		
2010–2012	Würzburger FV		
2012–2013	TSV Reichenberg		
- * Club domestic league appearances and goals

Peter Deißenberger (born 1 December 1976) is a German former football player. He made his debut on the professional league level in the Bundesliga for Eintracht Frankfurt on 29 September 2000 when he came on as a substitute in the 57th minute in a game against Borussia Dortmund.
