= Andreas Menger =

German footballer (born 1972)

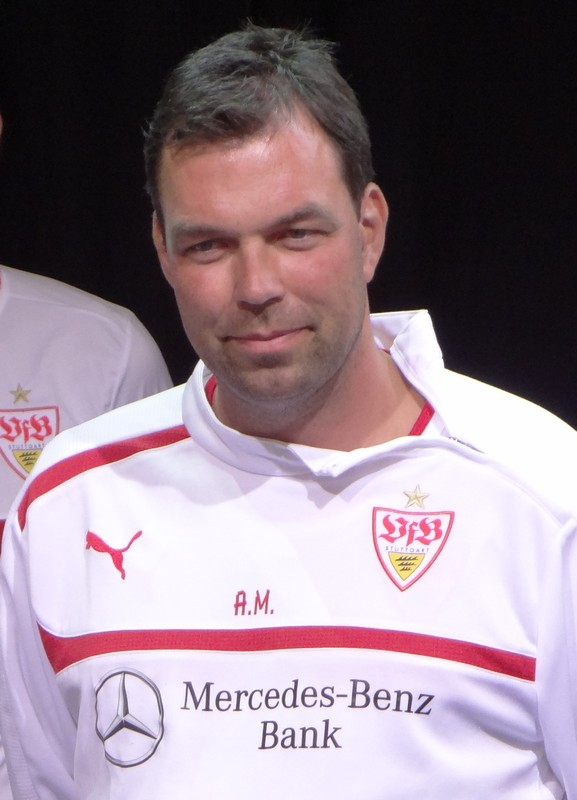
- Menger in 2012

Personal information
- Date of birth: 11 September 1972 (age 54)
- Place of birth: West Berlin, West Germany
- Height: 1.88 m (6 ft 2 in)
- Position: Goalkeeper

Youth career
- –1987: Tennis Borussia Berlin
- 1987–1991: SSV Reutlingen

Senior career*
Years	Team	Apps	(Gls)
1991–1994	SSV Ulm	20	(0)
1994–1997	SpVgg Fürth	97	(0)
1997–1999	1. FC Köln	41	(0)
1999–2000	MSV Duisburg	12	(0)
2001–2005	Eintracht Frankfurt	0	(0)
Total		170	(0)

Managerial career
- 2011–2016: VfB Stuttgart (goalkeeping coach)
- 2018–2021: 1. FC Köln (goalkeeping coach)
- 2022–: Hertha BSC (goalkeeping coach)
- * Club domestic league appearances and goals

Andreas Menger (born 11 September 1972) is a German former professional footballer who is goalkeeping coach of Hertha BSC.

Menger was born in West Berlin. A goalkeeper, played in German professional football between 1997 until 2005. But merely in his first season at the Cologne side he assured a regular spot. After the Billy Goats relegated, he had only eight appearances. In winter of the 1998–99 season, he was transferred to MSV Duisburg. While playing twelve times with the Zebras, he never played in one game when he was under contract for Frankfurt. Nevertheless, the executives were convinced of his abilities and from 2005 to 2011 he was the goalkeeping coach of the eagles, after splitting his duties between being a stand-by goalkeeper and coaching the keepers.

In July 2011, Menger became new goalkeeping coach of VfB Stuttgart. On 8 January 2013, Menger extended his contract with VfB Stuttgart until June 2016. Since January 2018, Menger has been the goalkeeping coach of 1. FC Köln.
