= Gerd Wimmer =

Austrian footballer

Personal information
- Full name: Gerd Wimmer
- Date of birth: January 9, 1977 (age 49)
- Place of birth: Laa an der Thaya, Austria
- Height: 1.76 m (5 ft 9 in)
- Position: Midfielder

Youth career
- FC Laa an der Thaya

Senior career*
Years	Team	Apps	(Gls)
1994	SCN Admira Wacker	8	(0)
1995	Sturm Graz	10	(1)
1995–1997	SCN Admira Wacker	41	(1)
1997–2000	Rapid Wien	83	(6)
2000–2002	Eintracht Frankfurt	52	(1)
2002–2004	Hansa Rostock	30	(1)
2004	Rot-Weiß Oberhausen	18	(0)
2005–2006	VfB Admira Wacker Mödling	25	(0)
2006	Austria Wien	8	(1)
2007–2008	Austria Wien II	31	(0)
Total		305	(11)

International career
1999–2002	Austria	5	(0)
- * Club domestic league appearances and goals

Gerd Wimmer (born January 9, 1977) is an Austrian former professional footballer who played as a midfielder.

== Club career ==
Wimmer was born in Laa an der Thaya, Lower Austria. His first club was his hometown club SV Laa an der Thaya. His first professional club was Admira Wacker, moving to Sturm Graz in 1995 and rejoining Admira later that year at the start of the 1995–1996 season. In 1997, he joined Vienna club Rapid Wien for whom he played three seasons, before moving abroad to play for German sides Eintracht Frankfurt, Hansa Rostock and Rot-Weiß Oberhausen.

In 2005, he returned to Austria to play for VfB Admira Wacker Mödling and a year later he signed for Austria Wien. On April 18, 2006 he received a record ban of 12 matches after attacking Wacker Tirol assistant manager Klaus Vogler after a match.

== International career ==
Wimmer made his debut for the Austria national team in an August 1999 friendly match against Sweden in Malmö and earned five caps, no goals scored. His final international was a September 2002 European Championship qualification match against Moldova.

== Career statistics ==
=== International ===
Appearances and goals by national team and year
National team	Year	Apps	Goals
Austria	1999	2	0
Austria	2000	0	0
Austria	2001	0	0
Austria	2002	3	0
Total		5	0
