= Horst Heldt =

German footballer and executive (born 1969)

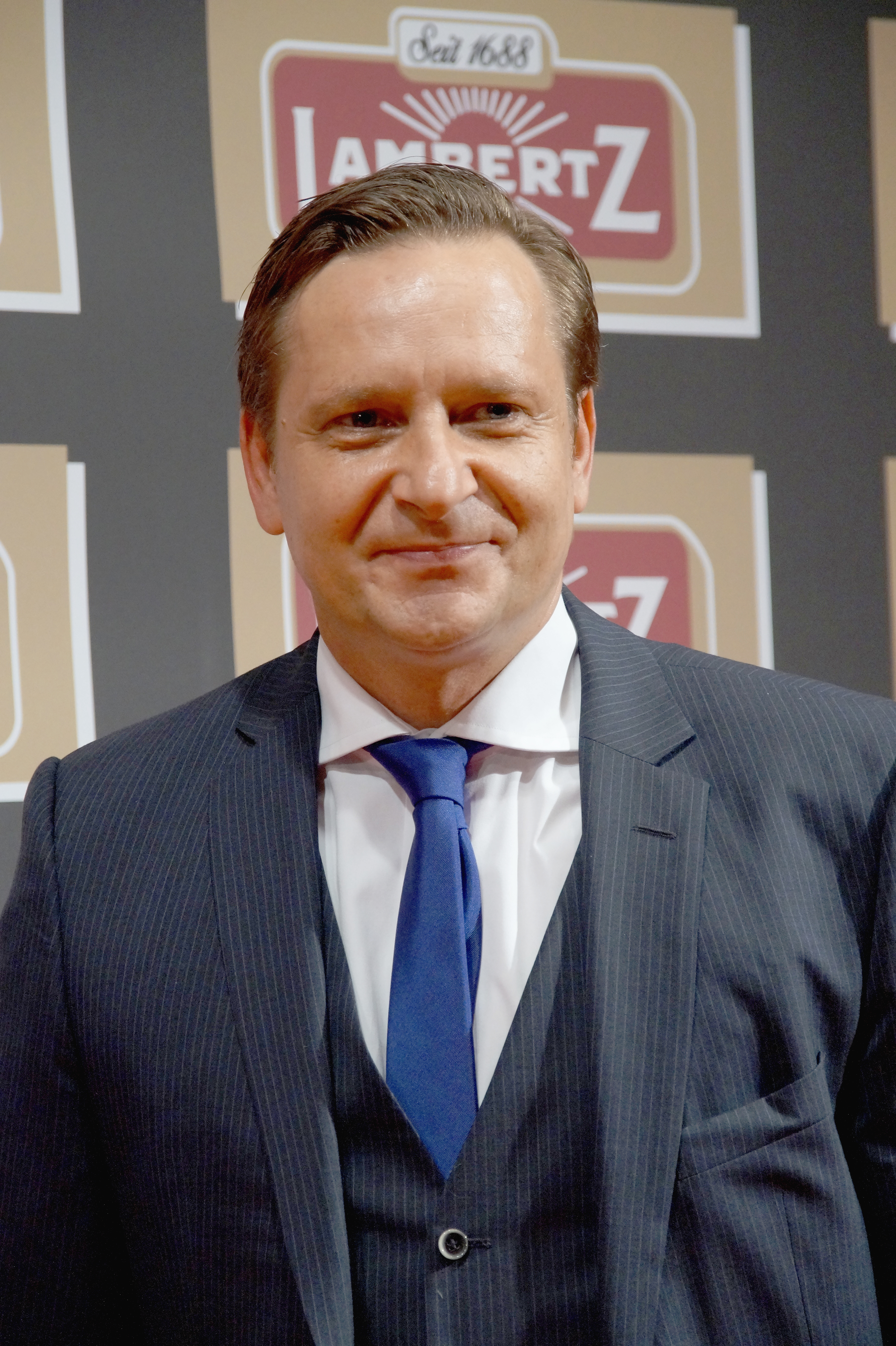
- Heldt in 2016

Personal information
- Date of birth: 9 December 1969 (age 56)
- Place of birth: Königswinter, West Germany
- Height: 1.70 m (5 ft 7 in)
- Position: Midfielder

Team information
- Current team: 1. FC Union Berlin (sporting director)

Youth career
- 1975–1986: SV Königswinter
- 1986–1987: FV Bad Honnef
- 1987–1990: 1. FC Köln

Senior career*
Years	Team	Apps	(Gls)
1990–1995	1. FC Köln	130	(13)
1995–1999	1860 Munich	111	(11)
1999–2001	Eintracht Frankfurt	64	(9)
2001–2002	Sturm Graz	33	(1)
2002–2006	VfB Stuttgart	54	(3)
2005	VfB Stuttgart II	1	(0)
Total		393	(37)

International career
1999	Germany	2	(0)
- * Club domestic league appearances and goals

Horst Heldt (born 9 December 1969) is a German football executive and former player who played as a midfielder. He is the sporting director of 1. FC Union Berlin.

== Playing career ==
Heldt was born in Königswinter. He played at 1. FC Köln from 1990 until 1995, before transferring to TSV 1860 Munich. After four years there, he went to Eintracht Frankfurt in 1999. After the club was relegated in 2001, he played for Austrian side Sturm Graz. In January 2003, Heldt returned to Germany, to VfB Stuttgart.

He always played as a midfielder. His tally of Bundesliga matches is 359. Heldt also played for the Germany national team twice in 1999.

== Managerial career ==
After only being a substitute and not getting any playing time at VfB Stuttgart in the first half of the 2005–06 season under coach Giovanni Trapattoni, Heldt decided to end his active career on 3 January 2006 to take over the post of general manager of the club.

As manager, Heldt supported the sacking of Trapattoni and the hiring of new coach Armin Veh. Due to Heldt, Veh's initial stop-gap contract was extended into the 2006–07 season which became Stuttgart's most successful ever, winning the championship and qualifying for the German Cup final.

On 3 July 2010, he moved to Schalke 04. After the sacking of Felix Magath, Heldt became responsible for sport and communications on the managing board of Schalke. Heldt decided to step down at the end of the 2015–16 season.

Heldt worked for Hannover 96 from March 2017 to April 2019. In summer, Hannover was promoted to the Bundesliga.

On 9 April 2019, Hannover 96 announced the release of Heldt.

On 19 November 2019, 1. FC Köln announced Heldt as new general manager alongside new head coach Markus Gisdol.
