= Markus Ehrhard =

German footballer

Personal information
- Date of birth: 14 July 1976 (age 50)
- Height: 1.83 m (6 ft 0 in)
- Positions: Defender; midfielder

Youth career
- FC Remscheid

Senior career*
Years	Team	Apps	(Gls)
2000–2002	VfL Bochum II	55	(11)
2001–2002	VfL Bochum	4	(0)
2002–2004	SG Wattenscheid 09	36	(4)
2004–2005	KFC Uerdingen 05	32	(1)
2006	Vorwärts Kornharpen		
2006–2009	KFC Uerdingen 05	59	(3)
2009–2010	TuS Hattingen		
- * Club domestic league appearances and goals

Markus Ehrhard (born 14 July 1976) is a retired German football player.

== Career ==
He made his debut on the professional league level in the 2. Bundesliga for VfL Bochum on 3 February 2002 when he came on as a substitute in the 90th minute in the game against 1. FSV Mainz 05.
