= Ermin Melunović =

Serbian footballer

Personal information
- Date of birth: 18 May 1973 (age 53)
- Place of birth: Prijepolje, SFR Yugoslavia
- Height: 1.80 m (5 ft 11 in)
- Position: Striker

Youth career
- SV Horn
- First Vienna
- Kremser SC

Senior career*
Years	Team	Apps	(Gls)
–1998	SV Wehen Taunusstein		
1995–1999	Eintracht Trier	140	(43)
2000	FSV Mainz	8	(1)
2000–2001	SV Wehen	19	(4)
2001–2002	FC Schweinfurt 05 (loan)	26	(14)
2002–2003	FSV Mainz	9	(0)
2003	Jahn Regensburg	1	(0)
2004–2005	SV Wehen	25	(5)
2005–2006	Fortuna Düsseldorf	18	(0)
2006	Viktoria Aschaffenburg	15	(14)
2007	Eintracht Trier	4	(0)
2007–2009	Waldhof Mannheim	54	(14)
2009–2010	Darmstadt 98	29	(10)
2010–2011	Amicitia Viernheim	6	(3)
2011–2012	Bruchsal	7	(1)
2012–2013	FV Biebrich	0	(0)
Total		361	(109)
- * Club domestic league appearances and goals

Ermin Melunović (born 18 May 1973) is a Serbian former professional footballer who spent his career primarily in Germany.
