= 2001–02 2. Bundesliga =

28th season of the second-tier football league in Germany

2. Bundesliga
- Season: 2001–02
- Champions: Hannover 96
- Promoted: Hannover 96; Arminia Bielefeld; VfL Bochum
- Relegated: SpVgg Unterhaching; 1. FC Saarbrücken; FC Schweinfurt 05; SV Babelsberg 03
- Top goalscorer: Artur Wichniarek (20)

The 2001–02 2. Bundesliga was the 28th season of the 2. Bundesliga, the second tier of the German football league system. Hannover 96, Arminia Bielefeld and VfL Bochum were promoted to the Bundesliga while SpVgg Unterhaching, 1. FC Saarbrücken, FC Schweinfurt 05 and SV Babelsberg 03 were relegated to the Regionalliga.

== League table ==
For the 2001–02 season SV Babelsberg 03, 1. FC Union Berlin, Karlsruher SC and 1. FC Schweinfurt 05 were newly promoted to the 2. Bundesliga from the Regionalliga while SpVgg Unterhaching, Eintracht Frankfurt and VfL Bochum had been relegated to the league from the Bundesliga.

Locations of the participating teams of the 2001–02 season

Pos	Team	Pld	W	D	L	GF	GA	GD	Pts	Promotion or relegation
1	Hannover 96 (C, P)	34	22	9	3	93	37	+56	75	Promotion to Bundesliga
2	Arminia Bielefeld (P)	34	19	8	7	68	38	+30	65	Promotion to Bundesliga
3	VfL Bochum (P)	34	19	8	7	69	49	+20	65	Promotion to Bundesliga
4	Mainz 05	34	18	10	6	66	38	+28	64	
5	SpVgg Greuther Fürth	34	16	11	7	62	41	+21	59	
6	Union Berlin	34	16	8	10	61	41	+20	56	
7	Eintracht Frankfurt	34	14	12	8	52	44	+8	54	
8	LR Ahlen	34	14	6	14	60	70	−10	48	
9	Waldhof Mannheim	34	12	9	13	42	48	−6	45	
10	SSV Reutlingen	34	13	5	16	53	57	−4	44	
11	MSV Duisburg	34	11	10	13	56	57	−1	43	
12	Rot-Weiß Oberhausen	34	11	9	14	55	49	+6	42	
13	Karlsruher SC	34	11	8	15	45	51	−6	41	
14	Alemannia Aachen	34	12	4	18	41	67	−26	40	
15	SpVgg Unterhaching (R)	34	10	8	16	40	49	−9	38	Relegation to Regionalliga (Note: SV Babelsberg was relegated to Regionalliga Nord. FC Schweinfurt 05, 1. FC Saarbrücken and SpVgg Unterhaching were relegated to Regionalliga Süd.)
16	1. FC Saarbrücken (R)	34	6	7	21	30	74	−44	25	Relegation to Regionalliga
17	FC Schweinfurt 05 (R)	34	6	6	22	30	70	−40	24	Relegation to Regionalliga
18	SV Babelsberg 03 (R)	34	4	6	24	39	82	−43	18	Relegation to Regionalliga

Source: Bundesliga.de
Rules for classification: 1) points; 2) goal difference; 3) number of goals scored.
(C) Champions; (P) Promoted; (R) Relegated

== Results ==
Home \ Away	AAC	LRA	SVB	UNB	DSC	BOC	DUI	SGE	SGF	H96	KSC	M05	WMA	RWO	R05	FCS	S05	UNT
Alemannia Aachen	—	1–2	2–2	1–2	3–2	1–3	2–1	2–1	2–1	2–4	2–0	0–2	1–0	2–1	1–1	0–0	1–0	3–1
LR Ahlen	1–0	—	1–1	2–2	1–1	2–5	2–2	0–1	1–0	2–5	4–1	1–4	0–0	2–1	1–2	3–1	3–1	2–0
SV Babelsberg	0–2	1–2	—	3–2	0–2	1–2	3–1	1–3	1–5	1–3	2–4	0–1	1–2	0–2	0–3	1–2	3–1	1–4
Union Berlin	5–1	5–0	2–0	—	2–1	1–0	0–1	0–4	0–0	1–1	1–3	3–1	2–0	3–1	5–0	3–0	3–0	0–2
Arminia Bielefeld	4–1	3–1	0–1	4–1	—	3–0	2–2	4–1	3–2	3–2	1–1	0–1	5–0	3–1	1–1	3–1	2–1	2–0
VfL Bochum	5–3	3–1	4–1	2–1	0–0	—	3–0	3–0	1–1	4–2	1–1	2–1	1–1	3–3	3–1	3–2	3–1	4–0
MSV Duisburg	5–0	1–4	4–1	1–1	2–1	0–1	—	1–1	1–1	2–6	2–0	1–1	3–1	1–4	3–3	5–0	0–0	4–0
Eintracht Frankfurt	2–2	1–2	1–1	2–2	0–2	1–0	2–0	—	1–4	1–1	3–1	0–0	2–2	2–2	3–1	2–2	2–0	3–2
Greuther Fürth	3–0	3–2	1–0	0–0	0–1	1–1	2–1	1–1	—	1–5	1–1	3–2	3–1	2–2	4–1	3–1	2–0	3–1
Hannover 96	3–0	3–1	6–1	3–2	4–4	2–0	4–1	1–2	3–1	—	5–0	2–0	3–1	2–0	4–0	0–0	6–0	1–0
Karlsruher SC	1–2	2–2	2–1	1–1	0–1	4–1	2–0	2–3	4–2	1–2	—	1–4	1–2	0–1	1–0	2–0	1–0	3–0
Mainz 05	0–1	5–1	2–2	1–0	4–1	1–1	4–4	1–1	1–1	2–2	1–0	—	3–0	3–3	2–1	2–1	4–1	2–0
Waldhof Mannheim	3–1	2–0	4–1	1–1	1–1	1–2	3–1	0–0	1–4	0–1	2–1	2–4	—	1–1	1–0	4–0	2–0	0–1
Rot-Weiß Oberhausen	4–0	2–3	2–1	0–3	0–0	6–1	0–2	2–1	1–2	0–0	1–2	1–3	1–1	—	0–1	2–1	5–0	0–2
SSV Reutlingen	3–1	3–2	3–2	1–2	2–3	3–0	0–1	2–1	0–1	2–2	1–0	2–0	3–0	0–2	—	3–0	3–1	1–1
1. FC Saarbrücken	2–1	2–4	1–1	2–3	0–2	0–2	1–0	0–2	0–3	1–1	1–1	0–1	1–3	1–0	4–3	—	2–1	0–0
1. FC Schweinfurt	1–0	4–2	3–3	0–1	1–0	3–3	2–2	0–1	0–0	1–4	1–1	0–3	0–1	0–3	2–1	2–1	—	3–1
SpVgg Unterhaching	2–0	2–3	3–1	2–1	1–3	0–2	0–1	0–1	1–1	1–1	0–0	0–0	0–0	1–1	3–2	8–0	1–0	—

Source: DFB
Legend: Blue = home team win; Yellow = draw; Red = away team win.

== Top scorers ==
The league's top scorers:

Goals	Player	Team
20	(Poland) Artur Wichniarek	Arminia Bielefeld
19	(Germany) Marcus Feinbier	LR Ahlen
18	(Czech Republic) Jan Šimák	Hannover 96
17	(Spain) Thomas Christiansen	VfL Bochum
16	(Poland) Paweł Kryszałowicz	Eintracht Frankfurt
16	(Germany) Daniel Stendel	Hannover 96
15	(Morocco) Rachid Azzouzi	SpVgg Greuther Fürth
14	(Federal Republic of Yugoslavia) Ermin Melunović	FC Schweinfurt 05
14	(Democratic Republic of the Congo) Blaise Kufo	1. FSV Mainz 05
14	(Federal Republic of Yugoslavia) Sreto Ristić	1. FC Union Berlin
