= 2004–05 Eintracht Frankfurt season =

Eintracht Frankfurt
2004–05 season
- Chairman: Heribert Bruchhagen
- Manager: Friedhelm Funkel
- 2. Bundesliga: 3rd (promoted)
- DFB-Pokal: Third round
- Top goalscorer: League: Arie van Lent (16); All: Arie van Lent (16)
- Highest home attendance: 42,500 22 May 2005 v Wacker Burghausen (league)
- Lowest home attendance: 12,000 26 October 2004 v LR Ahlen (league)
- Average home league attendance: 23,547
Home colours	Away colours

Eintracht Frankfurt competed in the 2nd Bundesliga and in the DFB Pokal in the 2004–05 season.

== Results ==
=== Legend ===
Win Draw Loss Postponed

=== Friendlies ===
4 July 2004	Sportfreunde Oberau	0–11	Eintracht Frankfurt	Altenstadt, Germany
16:00 CEST		(Report)	Lenze 4'; Kreuz 23'; Hoffmann 24'; Beierle 35', 40'; Nico Frommer 67', 71'; Dragusha 70', 84', 86'; Meier 81'	Stadium: Waldsportplatz; Attendance: 2,000

7 July 2004	Zillertal XI	0–7	Eintracht Frankfurt	Zell, Austria
18:00 CEST		(Report)	Van Lent 7'; Köhler 21', 38'; Frommer 58', 67'; Cimen 73'; Schur 79'	Stadium: Sportplatz Zell am Ziller; Attendance: 500

7 July 2004	VfB Marburg	0–7	Eintracht Frankfurt	Marburg, Germany
16:00 CEST	Preuss (yellow card) (yellow-red card)	(Report)	Frommer 7', 14', 15', 44', 54'; Meier 8'; Reinhard 9'	Stadium: Georg-Gaßmann-Stadion; Attendance: 3,000; Referee: Pfuhl

13 July 2004	SG Bruchköbel	1–5	Eintracht Frankfurt	Hanau, Germany
19:00 CEST	Nuhn 42'	(Report)	Van Lent 25' (pen.), 65'; Kreuz 75'; Beierle 76', 80'	Stadium: Rudolf-Harbig-Stadion; Attendance: 2,500

16 July 2004	Bayer Leverkusen	2–2	Eintracht Frankfurt	Düsseldorf, Germany
20:15 CEST	Jones 43'; Berbatov 46'	(Report)	Meier 31', 36'	Stadium: Paul-Janes-Stadion; Attendance: 800

20 July 2004	Germania Ober-Roden	0–1	Eintracht Frankfurt	Rödermark, Germany
19:00 CEST		(Report)	Beierle 20'	Stadium: Sportanlage Frankfurter Straße; Attendance: 2,500

23 July 2004	FC St. Pauli	0–1	Eintracht Frankfurt	Hamburg, Germany
19:30 CEST		(Report)	Meier 54'	Stadium: Millerntor-Stadion; Attendance: 3,500; Referee: Schriever

27 July 2004	Eichsfeld XI	1–14	Eintracht Frankfurt	Teistungen, Germany
19:00 CEST	Thüne 67'	(Report)	Beierle 2', 34', 39', 49'; Van Lent 8', 17', 26'; Meier 37'; Köhler 38', 40', 44', 54'; Husterer (57.) 57'; Dragusha 73'	Stadium: Sportanlage; Attendance: 650; Referee: Kruse

29 July 2004	Hannover 96	1–1	Eintracht Frankfurt	Göttingen, Germany
19:00 CEST	Agac 22'	(Report)	Beierle 70'	Stadium: Jahnstadion; Attendance: 3,000

4 August 2004	TV Haßloch	0–12	Eintracht Frankfurt	Rüsselsheim, Germany
18:30 CEST		(Report)	Köhler 9', 11', 38'; Meier 17'; Beierle 35', 70'; Ochs 58'; Lenze 59'; Huber 61'; Singh 67' (o.g.); Frommer 82', 86'	Stadium: Stadion am Sommerdamm; Attendance: 1,500; Referee: Öztürk

17 August 2004	TSV Grebenhain	0–8	Eintracht Frankfurt	Grebenhain, Germany
18:30 CEST		(Report)	Cha 6', 26', 50', 52'; Weissenberger 9' (pen.); Beierle 39', 40', 86'	Stadium: Sportplatz; Attendance: 2,000

24 August 2004	Melsunger FV	0–11	Eintracht Frankfurt	Melsungen, Germany
18:30 CEST		(Report)	Frommer 4', 6', 33', 61'; Weissenberger 12', 15'; Beierle 21', 26', 63', 77'; Russ 68'	Stadium: Stadion auf der Freundschaftsinsel; Attendance: 1,200

3 September 2004	Borussia Mönchengladbach	4–1	Eintracht Frankfurt	Viersen, Germany
18:30 CEST	Van Hout 11'; Neuville 43', 56'; Schlaudraff 76'	(Report)	Frommer 33' (pen.)	Stadium: Stadion Hoher Busch; Attendance: 3,000

14 September 2004	SG Großostheim/ Pflaumheim	2–12	Eintracht Frankfurt	Großostheim, Germany
18:30 CEST	Kopp 75'; Brönner 90'	(Report)	Frommer 4', 9', 18', 29'; Beierle 31', 63', 87'; Wiedener 37'; Lenze 48'; Weissenberger 54', 55'; Dragusha 58'	Stadium: Bachgau-Stadion; Attendance: 1,500

12 October 2004	Hessen Kassel	2–4	Eintracht Frankfurt	Kassel, Germany
16:30 CEST	Warneke 77', 83'	(Report)	Beierle 21'; Meier 40'; Lenze 44'; Köhler 71'	Stadium: Auestadion; Attendance: 1,000

9 January 2005	SC Freiburg	0–0	Eintracht Frankfurt	Albufeira, Portugal
16:30 CEST		(Report)		Attendance: 100

11 January 2005	FC Zwolle	0–2	Eintracht Frankfurt	Vale do Lobo, Portugal
16:30 CEST		(Report)	Cha 53'; Köhler 67'	Attendance: 50

16 January 2005	TuS Koblenz	1–2	Eintracht Frankfurt	Koblenz, Germany
	Grenier 76'	(Report)	Köhler 25'; Weissenberger 70'	Stadium: Stadion Oberwerth; Attendance: 2,000

21 February 2005 Charity tournament	Eintracht Frankfurt	2–0	Kickers Offenbach	Frankfurt, Germany
19:30 CEST	Ochs 24'; Meier 33'	(Report)		Stadium: Waldstadion; Attendance: 11,000

21 February 2005 Charity tournament	Eintracht Frankfurt	1–0	FSV Mainz 05	Frankfurt, Germany
21:30 CEST	Alexander Meier 20'	(Report)		Stadium: Waldstadion; Attendance: 11,000

24 May 2005	KSV Klein-Karben	3–5	Eintracht Frankfurt	Karben, Germany
18:30 CEST	Cue 16'; Russ 70', 85'	(Report)	Beierle 20', 30'; Dragusha 24' (pen.); Cimen 62', 65'	Attendance: 3,500

=== Bundesliga ===
==== League table ====
Pos	Team	Pld	W	D	L	GF	GA	GD	Pts	Promotion or relegation
1	1. FC Köln (C, P)	34	20	7	7	62	33	+29	67	Promotion to Bundesliga
2	MSV Duisburg (P)	34	19	5	10	50	37	+13	62	Promotion to Bundesliga
3	Eintracht Frankfurt (P)	34	19	4	11	65	39	+26	61	Promotion to Bundesliga
4	1860 Munich	34	15	12	7	52	39	+13	57	
5	SpVgg Greuther Fürth	34	17	5	12	51	42	+9	56	

Source: Bundesliga.de
Rules for classification: 1) points; 2) goal difference; 3) number of goals scored.
(C) Champions; (P) Promoted

==== Results summary ====
Overall								Home						Away					
Pld	W	D	L	GF	GA	GD	Pts	W	D	L	GF	GA	GD	W	D	L	GF	GA	GD
34	19	4	11	65	39	+26	61	14	0	3	35	12	+23	5	4	8	30	27	+3

Source: Competitive matches

==== Results by round ====
Round	1	2	3	4	5	6	7	8	9	10	11	12	13	14	15	16	17	18	19	20	21	22	23	24	25	26	27	28	29	30	31	32	33	34
Ground	A	H	A	H	A	H	A	H	A	H	A	H	A	H	A	H	A	H	A	H	A	H	A	H	A	H	A	H	A	H	A	H	A	H
Result	D	W	L	W	L	W	D	L	L	L	L	W	D	W	D	W	W	W	L	W	L	W	W	W	L	W	L	W	W	W	W	L	W	W
Position	9	5	12	7	11	5	7	9	11	13	14	12	12	8	9	8	5	5	6	6	7	5	4	4	5	5	7	5	3	3	3	3	3	3

Source: kicker.de
A = Away; H = Home; W = Win; D = Draw; L = Loss

==== Matches ====
9 August 2004 1	Alemannia Aachen	1–1	Eintracht Frankfurt	Aachen, Germany
20:15 CEST	Plaßhenrich 87'	(Report)	Meier 77'	Stadium: Old Tivoli; Attendance: 22,000; Referee: Felix Brych

15 August 2004 2	Eintracht Frankfurt	2–1	Karlsruher SC	Frankfurt, Germany
15:00 CEST	Hoffmann 47'; Köhler 51'	(Report)	Abderrahim Ouakili 86'	Stadium: Waldstadion; Attendance: 26,800; Referee: Wolfgang Stark

30 August 2004 3	1. FC Köln	2–0	Eintracht Frankfurt	Cologne, Germany
20:15 CEST	Scherz 34'; Podolski 80'	(Report)		Stadium: RheinEnergieStadion; Attendance: 42,000; Referee: Peter Gagelmann

7 August 2004 4	Eintracht Frankfurt	2–1	Dynamo Dresden	Frankfurt, Germany
19:00 CEST	Hoffmann 29'; Reinhard 51'	(Report)	Beuchel 83'	Stadium: Waldstadion; Attendance: 25,000; Referee: Kemmling

19 September 2004 5	1. FC Saarbrücken	3–0	Eintracht Frankfurt	Saarbrücken, Germany
15:00 CEST	Benčík 35'; Diané 73', 84'	(Report)		Stadium: Ludwigsparkstadion; Attendance: 12,000; Referee: Stachowiak

26 September 2004 6	Eintracht Frankfurt	6–2	Rot-Weiß Oberhausen	Frankfurt, Germany
15:00 CEST	Meier 35'; Beierle 46', 59'; Lexa 50'; Van Lent 68'; Hoffmann 90'	(Report)	Bajzát 31'; Tokody 74'	Stadium: Waldstadion; Attendance: 17,000; Referee: Walz

1 October 2004 7	Rot-Weiss Essen	4–4	Eintracht Frankfurt	Essen, Germany
19:00 CEST	Bilgin 7', 35'; Peter Foldgast 58'; Wedau 74'	(Report)	Lexa 5'; Köhler 26'; Meier 71'; Lenze 90'	Stadium: Georg-Melches-Stadion; Attendance: 17,000; Referee: Perl

18 October 2004 8	Eintracht Frankfurt	1–2	TSV 1860 München	Frankfurt, Germany
20:15 CEST	Van Lent 56'; Hoffmann (red card) 90'	(Report)	Kolomazník 5'; Lehmann 45' (pen.); Týce (yellow card) 60' (yellow-red card)	Stadium: Waldstadion; Referee: Thorsten Kinhöfer

22 October 2004 9	SpVgg Greuther Fürth	2–1	Eintracht Frankfurt	Fürth, Germany
19:00 CEST	Rösler 37'; Hilbert 58'	(Report)	Lenze 36'	Stadium: Playmobil-Stadion; Attendance: 10,000; Referee: Jansen

26 October 2004 10	Eintracht Frankfurt	2–3	LR Ahlen	Frankfurt, Germany
17:30 CEST	Cha 2'; Van Lent 39'	(Report)	N'Diaye 1', 11'; Svitlica 82'	Stadium: Waldstadion; Attendance: 12,000; Referee: Seemann

29 October 2004 11	SpVgg Unterhaching	2–0	Eintracht Frankfurt	Unterhaching, Germany
19:00 CEST	Copado 16' (pen.), 53'	(Report)		Stadium: Generali Sportpark; Attendance: 4,500; Referee: Pickel

5 November 2004 12	Eintracht Frankfurt	2–0	Erzgebirge Aue	Frankfurt, Germany
19:00 CEST	Van Lent 45', 81'	(Report)		Stadium: Waldstadion; Attendance: 16,500; Referee: Wack

14 November 2004 13	Eintracht Trier	2–2	Eintracht Frankfurt	Trier, Germany
15:00 CEST	Patschinski 23' (pen.), 54'	(Report)	Reinhard 11'; Schur 43'	Stadium: Moselstadion; Attendance: 8,500; Referee: Albrecht

19 November 2004 14	Eintracht Frankfurt	2–1	Rot-Weiß Erfurt	Frankfurt, Germany
19:00 CEST	Hoffmann 6'; Chris 19'	(Report)	Barletta 54'	Stadium: Waldstadion; Attendance: 15,500; Referee: Felix Brych

26 November 2004 15	MSV Duisburg	1–1	Eintracht Frankfurt	Duisburg, Germany
19:00 CEST	Van Houdt 30'	(Report)	Van Lent 86'	Stadium: MSV-Arena; Attendance: 15,500; Referee: Fleischer

5 December 2004 16	Eintracht Frankfurt	3–1	Energie Cottbus	Frankfurt, Germany
15:00 CEST	Van Lent 14', 40'; Köhler 89'	(Report)	Mokhtari 56'	Stadium: Waldstadion; Attendance: 19,000; Referee: Schalk

10 December 2004 17	Wacker Burghausen	0–3	Eintracht Frankfurt	Burghausen, Germany
19:00 CEST		(Report)	Van Lent 35', 67'; Cha 81'	Stadium: Wacker-Arena; Attendance: 5,500; Referee: Michael Weiner

24 January 2005 18	Eintracht Frankfurt	1–0	Alemannia Aachen	Frankfurt, Germany
20:15 CEST	Van Lent 23'	(Report)		Stadium: Waldstadion; Attendance: 19,000; Referee: Wolfgang Stark

30 January 2005 19	Karlsruher SC	3–0	Eintracht Frankfurt	Karlsruhe, Germany
15:00 CEST	Saenko 36'; Masmanidis 54'; Danny Schwarz 88'	(Report)		Stadium: Wildparkstadion; Attendance: 16,500; Referee: Herbert Fandel

4 February 2005 20	Eintracht Frankfurt	1–0	1. FC Köln	Frankfurt, Germany
19:00 CEST	Van Lent 59'	(Report)		Stadium: Waldstadion; Attendance: 35,000; Referee: Albrecht

11 February 2005 21	Dynamo Dresden	2–1	Eintracht Frankfurt	Dresden, Germany
19:00 CEST	Lavric 17', 63'	(Report)	Schur 64'	Stadium: Rudolf-Harbig-Stadion; Attendance: 15,500; Referee: Schmidt

20 February 2005 22	Eintracht Frankfurt	3–0	1. FC Saarbrücken	Frankfurt, Germany
15:00 CEST	Weissenberger 21'; Jones 43'; Cimen 68'	(Report)	Demai (yellow card) 62' (yellow-red card)	Stadium: Waldstadion; Attendance: 18,500; Referee: Michael Weiner

27 February 2005 23	Rot-Weiß Oberhausen	0–3	Eintracht Frankfurt	Oberhausen, Germany
15:00 CEST		(Report)	Jones 31'; Van Lent 51'; Cha 80'	Stadium: Niederrheinstadion; Attendance: 6,000; Referee: Pickel

6 March 2005 24	Eintracht Frankfurt	1–0	Rot-Weiss Essen	Frankfurt, Germany
15:00 CEST	Goldbæk o.g.' (4); Schur (yellow card) 69' (yellow-red card)	(Report)		Stadium: Waldstadion; Attendance: 20,500; Referee: Kempter

14 March 2005 25	TSV 1860 München	2–1	Eintracht Frankfurt	Munich, Germany
20:15 CEST	Milchraum 6'; Lehmann 49' (pen.); Lehmann (yellow card) 90' (yellow-red card)	(Report)	Van Lent 43'	Stadium: Olympiastadion; Attendance: 20,000; Referee: Michael Weiner

21 March 2005 26	Eintracht Frankfurt	1–0	SpVgg Greuther Fürth	Frankfurt, Germany
20:15 CEST	Weissenberger 30'	(Report)		Stadium: Waldstadion; Attendance: 27,000; Referee: Thorsten Kinhöfer

3 April 2005 27	LR Ahlen	3–2	Eintracht Frankfurt	Ahlen, Germany
15:00 CEST	Felgenhauer 27'; Svitlica 41'; Gledson 50'	(Report)	Chris 28'; Meier 75' (pen.)	Stadium: Wersestadion; Attendance: 8,000; Referee: Kemmling

10 April 2005 28	Eintracht Frankfurt	3–0	SpVgg Unterhaching	Frankfurt, Germany
15:00 CEST	Cha 39'; Jones 46'; Köhler 63'	(Report)		Stadium: Waldstadion; Attendance: 21,000; Referee: Peter Gagelmann

17 April 2005 29	Erzgebirge Aue	0–5	Eintracht Frankfurt	Aue, Germany
15:00 CEST		(Report)	Köhler 2', 59'; Van Lent 45'; Ochs 50'; Cha 74'	Stadium: Erzgebirgsstadion; Attendance: 16,500; Referee: Schalk

22 April 2005 30	Eintracht Frankfurt	2–0	Eintracht Trier	Frankfurt, Germany
19:00 CEST	Cha 38', 65'	(Report)		Stadium: Waldstadion; Attendance: 27,000; Referee: Drees

29 April 2005 31	Rot-Weiß Erfurt	0–3	Eintracht Frankfurt	Erfurt, Germany
19:00 CEST		(Report)	Van Lent 3'; Cha 21'; Meier 36'	Stadium: Steigerwaldstadion; Attendance: 17,500; Referee: Knut Kircher

9 May 2005 32	Eintracht Frankfurt	0–1	MSV Duisburg	Frankfurt, Germany
20:15 CEST		(Report)	Ahanfouf 8'	Stadium: Waldstadion; Attendance: 37,000; Referee: Florian Meyer

15 May 2005 33	Energie Cottbus	0–3	Eintracht Frankfurt	Cottbus, Germany
15:00 CEST		(Report)	Meier 14', 64', 66'	Stadium: Stadion der Freundschaft; Attendance: 18,000; Referee: Thorsten Kinhöfer

22 May 2005 34	Eintracht Frankfurt	3–0	Wacker Burghausen	Frankfurt, Germany
15:00 CEST	Köhler 17'; Meier 66'; Beierle 90'	(Report)		Stadium: Waldstadion; Attendance: 42,500; Referee: Markus Merk

=== DFB-Pokal ===
21 August 2004 First round	Rot-Weiß Erfurt	0–1	Eintracht Frankfurt	Erfurt, Germany
15:00 CEST		(Report)	Patrick Ochs 72'	Stadium: Steigerwaldstadion; Attendance: 14,500; Referee: Peter Sippel

22 September 2004 Second round	Eintracht Frankfurt	4–2 (a.e.t.)	Greuther Fürth	Frankfurt, Germany
19:00 CEST	Wiedener 14'; Lenze 76'; Meier 102'; Cha 110'	(Report)	Fuchs 34'; Rösler 84'	Stadium: Waldstadion; Attendance: 9,500; Referee: Manuel Gräfe

10 November 2004 Third round	Eintracht Frankfurt	0–2	Schalke 04	Frankfurt, Germany
19:30 CEST		(Report)	Husterer 32' (o.g.); Hanke 77'	Stadium: Waldstadion; Attendance: 37,000; Referee: Knut Kircher

=== Indoor soccer tournaments ===
==== Hessen Cup ====
17 December 2004 1st Match	Eintracht Frankfurt	4–2	Kickers Offenbach	Frankfurt, Germany
	Köhler; Reinhard; Wiedener	(Report)	Goal	Stadium: Fraport Arena; Attendance: 4,000

17 December 2004 2nd Match	Eintracht Frankfurt	1–1	TuS Koblenz	Frankfurt, Germany
	Hoffmann	(Report)	Goal	Stadium: Fraport Arena; Attendance: 4,000

17 December 2004 Semi-final	Eintracht Frankfurt	1–2	VfL Bochum	Frankfurt, Germany
	Hoffmann	(Report)	Goal	Stadium: Fraport Arena; Attendance: 4,000

17 December 2004 3rd place play-off	Eintracht Frankfurt	4–3	TuS Koblenz	Frankfurt, Germany
	Ochs; Beierle; Hoffmann; Köhler	(Report)	Goal	Stadium: Fraport Arena; Attendance: 4,000

==== Cup der Öffentlichen Versicherungen ====
3 January 2005 1st Match	Werder Bremen	3–2	Eintracht Frankfurt	Oldenburg, Germany
	Goal	(Report)	Köhler; Beierle	Stadium: Weser-Ems-Halle; Attendance: 4,500

3 January 2006 2nd Match	Pogoń Szczecin	0–0	Eintracht Frankfurt	Oldenburg, Germany
		(Report)		Stadium: Weser-Ems-Halle; Attendance: 4,500

3 January 2005 Semi-final	MSV Duisburg	2–5	Eintracht Frankfurt	Oldenburg, Germany
	Goal	(Report)	Russ; Schur; Ochs van Lent; Köhler	Stadium: Weser-Ems-Halle; Attendance: 4,500

3 January 2005 Final	Werder Bremen	1–4	Eintracht Frankfurt	Oldenburg, Germany
	Goal	(Report)	Beierle; Russ; Schur	Stadium: Weser-Ems-Halle; Attendance: 4,500

== Players ==
=== First-team squad ===
Squad at end of season

Note: Flags indicate national team as defined under FIFA eligibility rules; some limited exceptions apply. Players may hold more than one non-FIFA nationality.

No.	Pos.	Nation	Player
1	GK	(North Macedonia) MKD	Oka Nikolov (Note: Nikolov was born in Erbach im Odenwald, West Germany, but also qualified to represent Macedonia (now North Macedonia) internationally and made his international debut for Macedonia in September 1998.)
2	DF	(Germany) GER	Patrick Ochs
3	DF	(Germany) GER	Andree Wiedener
4	DF	(Germany) GER	Torben Hoffmann
5	DF	(Germany) GER	Jens Keller
6	MF	(Germany) GER	Christian Lenze
7	MF	(Germany) GER	Benjamin Köhler
8	MF	(Austria) AUT	Stefan Lexa
9	FW	(Netherlands) NED	Arie van Lent
10	MF	(Austria) AUT	Markus Weissenberger
11	MF	(South Korea) KOR	Cha Du-ri (Note: Cha was born in Frankfurt, West Germany, but also qualified to represent South Korea internationally through his father and made his international debut for South Korea in 2001.)
12	DF	(Germany) GER	Markus Husterer (on loan from Bayern Munich II)
13	MF	(Germany) GER	Jermaine Jones (Note: Jones was born in Frankfurt, West Germany, and represented Germany at U-20, U-21 and B level before making his international debut for Germany in 2008, but also qualified to represent the United States through his father and made his international debut for the United States in October 2010.) (on loan from Bayer Leverkusen)
14	MF	(Germany) GER	Alexander Meier (on loan from Hamburg)

No.	Pos.	Nation	Player
15	DF	(Croatia) CRO	Jurica Puljiz
16	DF	(North Macedonia) MKD	Aleksandar Vasoski
17	MF	(Germany) GER	Daniyel Cimen
19	MF	(Albania) ALB	Mehmet Dragusha (Note: Dragusha was born in Pristina, SFR Yugoslavia (now Kosovo), and made his international debut for Kosovo in September 2002, but also qualified to represent Albania internationally and made his international debut for Albania in 2003.)
20	FW	(Germany) GER	Markus Beierle
21	GK	(Germany) GER	Markus Pröll
22	DF	(Germany) GER	Christopher Reinhard
23	DF	(Germany) GER	Marco Russ
24	MF	(Germany) GER	Alexander Schur
25	DF	(Germany) GER	Alexander Huber (Note: Huber was born in Leninabad, Tajik SSR, Soviet Union (now Khujand, Tajikistan), but was raised in Germany from the age of 4 and represented Germany at U-20 and B level before making his international debut for Tajikistan in June 2017.)
28	GK	(Germany) GER	Jan Zimmermann
29	DF	(Brazil) BRA	Chris
30	GK	(Germany) GER	Andreas Menger

=== Left club during season ===
Note: Flags indicate national team as defined under FIFA eligibility rules; some limited exceptions apply. Players may hold more than one non-FIFA nationality.

No.	Pos.	Nation	Player
18	FW	(Germany) GER	Nico Frommer (on loan to Rot-Weiß Oberhausen)

=== Eintracht Frankfurt II ===
Note: Flags indicate national team as defined under FIFA eligibility rules; some limited exceptions apply. Players may hold more than one non-FIFA nationality.

No.	Pos.	Nation	Player
—	GK	(Germany) GER	Pablo Álvarez
—	DF	(Germany) GER	Mounir Chaftar
—	DF	(Germany) GER	Timothy Chandler (Note: Chandler was born in Frankfurt, West Germany (now Germany), but also qualified to represent the United States internationally through his father and made his international debut for the United States in March 2011.)
—	DF	(Germany) GER	Sebastian Jung
—	MF	(Germany) GER	Giovanni Speranza (Note: Speranza was born in Giessen, West Germany (now Germany), but also qualified to represent Italy internationally and represented Italy in futsal.)

No.	Pos.	Nation	Player
—	MF	(Germany) GER	Faton Toski (Note: Toski was born in Gjilan, SFR Yugoslavia (now Kosovo), but was raised in Germany and represented Germany at U-19 level before making his international debut for Kosovo in March 2014.)
—	MF	(Germany) GER	Richard Weil
—	MF	(Croatia) CRO	Krešo Ljubičić (Note: Ljubičić was born in Hanau, West Germany (now Germany), but also qualified to represent Croatia internationally and represented Croatia at U-17, U-18, U-19, U-20 and U-21 level.)
—	FW	(Germany) GER	Cenk Tosun (Note: Tosun was born in Wetzlar, Germany, and represented Germany at U-16, U-18, U-19 and U-21 level, but also qualified to represent Turkey internationally and represented Turkey at U-21 and B level before making his international debut for Turkey in October 2013.)

== Statistics ==
=== Appearances and goals ===
No.	Pos	Nat	Player	Total		2. Bundesliga		DFB-Pokal	
No.	Pos	Nat	Player	Apps	Goals	Apps	Goals	Apps	Goals
1	GK	(North Macedonia) MKD	Oka Nikolov	1	0	1	0	0	0
2	DF	(Germany) GER	Patrick Ochs	30	2	28	1	2	1
3	DF	(Germany) GER	Andree Wiedener	24	1	21	0	3	1
4	DF	(Germany) GER	Torben Hoffmann	32	4	29	4	3	0
5	DF	(Germany) GER	Jens Keller	16	0	15	0	1	0
6	MF	(Germany) GER	Christian Lenze	18	3	16	2	2	1
7	FW	(Germany) GER	Benjamin Köhler	32	7	29	7	3	0
8	MF	(Austria) AUT	Stefan Lexa	14	2	13	2	1	0
9	FW	(Netherlands) NED	Arie van Lent	34	16	32	16	2	0
10	MF	(Germany) GER	Markus Weissenberger	25	2	24	2	1	0
11	MF	(South Korea) KOR	Du-Ri Cha	32	9	29	8	3	1
13	MF	(Germany) GER	Jermaine Jones	14	3	14	3	0	0
14	MF	(Germany) GER	Alexander Meier	37	10	34	9	3	1
16	DF	(North Macedonia) MKD	Aleksandar Vasoski	15	0	15	0	0	0
17	MF	(Germany) GER	Daniyel Cimen	9	1	9	1	0	0
19	MF	(Albania) ALB	Mehmet Dragusha	6	0	5	0	1	0
20	FW	(Germany) GER	Markus Beierle	15	3	15	3	0	0
21	GK	(Germany) GER	Markus Pröll	1	0	1	0	0	0
22	DF	(Germany) GER	Christopher Reinhard	27	2	24	2	3	0
23	DF	(Germany) GER	Marco Russ	3	0	3	0	0	0
24	MF	(Germany) GER	Alexander Schur	26	2	23	2	3	0
25	DF	(Germany) GER	Alexander Huber	7	0	7	0	0	0
29	DF	(Brazil) BRA	Chris	22	2	20	2	2	0

=== Transfers ===
==== Transferred in ====
No.	Pos.	Name	Age	EU	Moving from	Type	Transfer Window	Contract ends	Transfer fee
2	Defender	Patrick Ochs	20	Yes	Bayern Munich II	Free transfer	Summer	30 June 2006	Free
4	Defender	Torben Hoffmann	29	Yes	TSV 1860 München	Free transfer	Summer	30 June 2006	Free
6	Midfielder	Christian Lenze	27	Yes	VfL Osnabrück	Transfer	Summer	30 June 2007	€50,000
7	Midfielder	Benjamin Köhler	23	Yes	Rot-Weiss Essen	Transfer	Summer	30 June 2008	€100,000
9	Striker	Arie van Lent	33	Yes	Borussia Mönchengladbach	Free transfer	Summer	30 June 2006	Free
10	Midfielder	Markus Weissenberger	29	Yes	TSV 1860 München	Free transfer	Summer	30 June 2006	Free
12	Defender	Markus Husterer	21	Yes	Bayern Munich II	Loan	Summer	31 December 2005	€150,000
13	Midfielder	Jermaine Jones	23	Yes	Bayer Leverkusen	Loan	Winter	30 June 2005	Free
14	Midfielder	Alexander Meier	21	Yes	Hamburger SV	Loan	Summer	30 June 2005	Free
16	Defender	Aleksandar Vasoski	25	No	FK Vardar	Transfer	Winter	30 June 2006	€200,000
22	Defender	Christopher Reinhard	19	Yes	Eintracht Frankfurt U19	Promoted	Summer	30 June 2006	Free
23	Defender	Marco Russ	18	Yes	Eintracht Frankfurt U19	Promoted	Summer	30 June 2006	Free

==== Transferred out ====
No.	Pos.	Name	Age	EU	Moving to	Type	Transfer Window	Transfer fee	Sources
2	Defender	Sven Günther	30	Yes	Erzgebirge Aue	Free transfer	Summer	Free	
3	Midfielder	Henning Bürger	34	Yes	Rot-Weiß Erfurt	Free transfer	Summer	Free	
6	Striker	Ioannis Amanatidis	22	Yes	1. FC Kaiserslautern	Loan end	Summer	Was previously loaned from Stuttgart	
7	Midfielder	Ervin Skela	27	Yes	Arminia Bielefeld	Free transfer	Summer	Free	
10	Striker	Nico Frommer	26	Yes	Rot-Weiß Oberhausen	Loan	Winter	Free	
13	Defender	Uwe Bindewald	35	Yes	1. FC Eschborn	Free transfer	Summer	Free	
16	Midfielder	Markus Kreuz	27	Yes	Rot-Weiß Erfurt	Transfer	Summer	€150,000	
21	Defender	Lars Weißenfeldt	24	Yes	Kickers Offenbach	Free transfer	Summer	Free	
23	Defender	Jean-Clotaire Tsoumou-Madza	29	No	Selangor MPPJ	Free transfer	Summer	Free	
27	Midfielder	Christoph Preuß	19	Yes	Bayer Leverkusen	Loan end	Summer	Free	
28	Defender	Nascimento	24	No	FC St. Pauli	Loan end	Summer	Free	
33	Defender	Ingo Hertzsch	26	Yes	Bayer Leverkusen	Loan return	Summer	Free	

== Sources ==
- Matheja, Ulrich (2011). Unsere Eintracht - Eintracht Frankfurt - Die Chronik. Die Werkstatt. ISBN 978-3-89533-750-5.
- Official English Eintracht website
- Eintracht-Archiv.de
- 2004–05 Eintracht Frankfurt season at Fussballdaten.de (in German)
