= 2013 Global Cebu F.C. season =

Global
2013 season
- Chairman: Dan Palami
- Manager: Brian Reid
- UFL Division 1: 2nd
- PFF Club Championship: Quarter-Finals (lost to Ceres)
- UFL Cup: Group Stage
- AFC President's Cup: Group Stage
- Singapore Cup: Semifinal round
- Top goalscorer: League: Izzeldin El Habbib (13); All: Izzeldin El Habbib (13)
Home colours	Away colours

The 2013 season is Global's 3rd season in the Philippines premier league, the UFL Division 1. They reached the quarterfinals of the 2013 PFF National Men's Club Championship after they lost to Ceres. They played in the 2013 AFC President's Cup after they top the previously concluded 2012 season, however they were eliminated after finishing third in Group B. Global also competed in the 2013 Singapore Cup, winning the last three matches, which booked them to the semifinals. Likewise, they will also compete in the 2013 UFL Cup.

They signed the service of Brian Reid for the preparation in the President's Cup and after the end of caretakers role of Dan Palami.

The club finished the 2013 season of the UFL Division 1 second behind the champions, Stallion Sta. Lucia.

== Squad ==
=== League Squad ===
As of 1 April 2013

Note: Flags indicate national team as defined under FIFA eligibility rules; some limited exceptions apply. Players may hold more than one non-FIFA nationality.

No.	Pos.	Nation	Player
1	GK	PHI	Paolo Pascual
3	DF	CIV	Ange Guisso
4	MF	PHI	Nino Ochoterena
5	MF	PHI	Jeremy Theuer
6	MF	PHI	Paul Mulders
7	DF	POL	Ben Starosta (captain)
8	FW	ESP	Rufo Sánchez (on loan from Stallion)
9	FW	PHI	Misagh Bahadoran
10	FW	SDN	Izzeldin El Habbib
14	MF	PHI	Carli de Murga
15	DF	GHA	Valentine Kama
16	GK	CIV	Roland Sadia
18	MF	PHI	Aaron Altiche

No.	Pos.	Nation	Player
22	GK	PHI	Eduardo Sacapaño (on loan from Philippine Army)
24	MF	PHI	Marwin Angeles
25	MF	PHI	Marvin Angeles
28	MF	PHI	Jeffrey Christiaens
30	FW	PHI	Joshua Beloya
33	DF	CIV	Delon Patrick Yao
63	DF	PHI	Jerry Barbaso
77	MF	PHI	Jason de Jong (on loan from Stallion)
93	MF	JPN	Yu Hoshide
--	MF	PHI	Mark Hartmann
--	DF	PHI	Amani Aguinaldo
--	DF	PHI	Emil Muncada

=== AFC President's Cup Squad ===
As of 8 May 2013

Note: Flags indicate national team as defined under FIFA eligibility rules; some limited exceptions apply. Players may hold more than one non-FIFA nationality.

No.	Pos.	Nation	Player
1	GK	PHI	Paolo Pascual
2	GK	CIV	Moussa Sanogo
4	MF	PHI	Nino Ochoterena
7	DF	POL	Ben Starosta
8	MF	PHI	David Basa (on loan from Laos FC)
9	FW	PHI	Misagh Bahadoran
14	MF	PHI	Carli de Murga
17	MF	PHI	Patrick Reichelt
18	MF	PHI	Aaron Altiche
19	MF	PHI	Jeremy Theuer
21	DF	PHI	Juan Luis Guirado (on loan from Racing Lermeño)

No.	Pos.	Nation	Player
22	GK	PHI	Eduardo Sacapaño (on loan from Philippine Army)
23	FW	PHI	Denis Wolf
24	MF	PHI	Marwin Angeles
25	MF	PHI	Marvin Angeles
28	MF	PHI	Jeffrey Christiaens
30	FW	PHI	Joshua Beloya
31	DF	PHI	Lexter Maravilla (on loan from Laos FC)
34	MF	PHI	Jhonny Dalman (on loan from Laos FC)
63	DF	PHI	Jerry Barbaso (captain)
77	MF	PHI	Jason de Jong (on loan from Stallion)

=== Singapore Cup Squad ===
Note: Flags indicate national team as defined under FIFA eligibility rules; some limited exceptions apply. Players may hold more than one non-FIFA nationality.

No.	Pos.	Nation	Player
1	GK	PHI	Paolo Pascual
3	DF	CIV	Ange Guisso
4	MF	PHI	Nino Ochoterena
5	MF	PHI	Jeremy Theuer
6	MF	PHI	Paul Mulders
7	DF	POL	Ben Starosta (captain)
8	FW	ESP	Rufo Sánchez (on loan from Stallion)
9	FW	PHI	Misagh Bahadoran
14	MF	PHI	Carli de Murga

No.	Pos.	Nation	Player
16	GK	CIV	Roland Sadia
18	MF	PHI	Aaron Altiche
22	GK	PHI	Eduardo Sacapaño (on loan from Philippine Army)
24	MF	PHI	Marwin Angeles
25	MF	PHI	Marvin Angeles
28	MF	PHI	Jeffrey Christiaens
30	FW	PHI	Joshua Beloya
33	DF	CIV	Delon Patrick Yao
63	DF	PHI	Jerry Barbaso

=== Transfers ===
==== In ====
#	Position:	Player	Transferred from	Fee	Date	Team	Source
	AMF	(Philippines) Paul Mulders	(Netherlands) ADO Den Haag	—	23 July 2013	First team	
	AMF, SS	(Philippines) Mark Hartmann	(Philippines) Loyola Meralco Sparks	—	—	First team	
	DF	(Philippines) Amani Aguinaldo	(Philippines) Loyola Meralco Sparks	—	—	First team	
	DF	(Philippines) Jamille Muncada	(Philippines) Pasargad	—	—	First team	
	MF	(Philippines) Ángel Guirado	(Spain) Olímpic Xàtiva	—	—	First team	

==== Out ====
#	Position	Player	Transferred to	Fee	Date	Team	Source
11	FW	(Philippines) Denis Wolf	(Germany) TSV Havelse	Free transfer	1 July 2013	First team	
29	RW	(Philippines) Patrick Reichelt	(Thailand) Singhtarua	—	—	First team	

==== Loan In ====
#	Position	Player	Loaned from	Date	Loan expires	Team	Source
	FW	(Spain) Rufo Sanchez	(Philippines) Stallion	—	End of the 2013 Singapore Cup	First team	
77	DMF	(Philippines) Jason de Jong	(Philippines) Stallion	—	End of the season	First team	
22	GK	(Philippines) Eduard Sacapaño	(Philippines) Philippine Army	January 2013	End of the season	First team	

==== Loan out ====
#	Position	Player	Loaned to	Date	Loan expires	Team	Source

== Competitions ==
=== Overview ===
Competition	Started round	Current position / round	Final position / round	First match	Last match
PFF Club Championship	Round of 16	—	Quarter-Finals	January 13, 2013	January 19, 2013
UFL Division 1	—	—	2nd	February 5, 2013	June 20, 2013
UFL Cup					
Singapore Cup	Preliminary round	Semifinal round		June 1, 2013	
AFC President's Cup	Group Stage	—	3rd on Group B	May 8, 2013	May 12, 2013

=== UFL Division 1 ===
==== League table ====
Pos	Team	Pld	W	D	L	GF	GA	GD	Pts
1	Stallion (C)	18	15	1	2	60	22	+38	46
2	Global	18	14	1	3	47	12	+35	43
3	Loyola	18	11	5	2	50	18	+32	38

Updated to match(es) played on 20 June 2013. Source: rsssf.com, soccerway.com
Rules for classification: 1) Points; 2) Goal Difference; 3) Goals Scored
(C) Champions

==== Matches ====
February 5, 2013 1	Global	2 – 0	PSG	Manila
19:30 PST	Ochoterena 45'; Starosta (yellow card) 12' (goal) 75'; Yao (yellow card) 45'; Sadia (yellow card) 63'; I. El Habbib (yellow card) 68'; Gardner (yellow card) 77'	Details; Report	Ataei (yellow card) 68'; Mbata (yellow card) 76'	Stadium: Rizal Memorial Stadium

February 14, 2013 2	Global	2 – 1	Manila Nomads	Taguig
19:30 PST	I. El Habbib 4'; Guisso (yellow card) 26'; Bahadoran (yellow card) 28'; Magassa 50' (o.g.); Yao (yellow card) 90+4'	Details; Report	B. El Habbib (yellow card) 35' (yellow-red card) 63'; Nnabuife 44'; Atangana (yellow card) 54'; Hacker (red card) 90'	Stadium: Emperador Stadium

February 19, 2013 3	Global	5 – 1	Green Archers United	Taguig
17:15 PST	de Murga 11'; I. El Habbib 15', 56'; Starosta (yellow card) 38'; Reichelt 60' (yellow card) 71'; Mv. Angeles 84'	Details; Report	Ikegwuruka (yellow card) 24'; Pasilan 49'	Stadium: Emperador Stadium

February 26, 2013 4	Philippine Army	0 – 6	Global	Taguig
17:15 PST		Details; Report	Starosta 26'; Bahadoran 35'; Christiaens 49', 74'; Uy 87'; Mw. Angeles 90'	Stadium: Emperador Stadium

March 5, 2013 5	Global	4 – 0	Pachanga Diliman	Taguig
17:15 PST	I. El Habbib 47', 70'; Christiaens (yellow card) 54' (goal) 62'; Guisso 80'	Details; Report	Sema (yellow card) 61'; Versales (red card) 88'	Stadium: Emperador Stadium

March 14, 2013 6	Philippine Air Force	0 – 2	Global	Taguig
19:30 PST	Albor (yellow card) 5'; Braga (yellow card) 24'; Dolloso (yellow card) 85'	Details; Report	Bahadoran (yellow card) 22'; Christiaens 62'; Reichelt (yellow card) 85' de Murga (yellow card) 86'; Yao (yellow card) 39' (goal) 90+1'	Stadium: Emperador Stadium

March 19, 2013 7	Global	1 – 0	Stallion Sta. Lucia	Taguig
19:30 PST	I. El Habbib (yellow card) 15', (goal) 78'; Yao (yellow card) 82'; Kama (yellow card) 89'; Gardner (yellow card) 90+3'	Details; Report	Cañas (yellow card) 15'; Bo Bae Park (yellow card) 72'; Hyo-Il (yellow card) 85'	Stadium: Emperador Stadium

April 2, 2013 8	Loyola	1 – 1	Global	Taguig
19:30 PST	P. Younghusband 76' (pen.); J. Younghusband (yellow card) 90+1'	Details; Report	Reichelt 10'; I. El Habbib (yellow card) 48'; Ochoterena (yellow card) 76'; Guisso (yellow card) 76'; Mw. Angeles (yellow card) 90'	Stadium: Emperador Stadium

April 11, 2013 9	Kaya	3 – 2	Global	Taguig
19:30 PST	Omura 19'; Kigbu (yellow card) 37'; Lewis (yellow card) 52'; Burkey 54', 83'	Details; Report	Reichelt 7', 8' de Jong (yellow card) 85'	Stadium: Emperador Stadium

April 16, 2013 10	PSG	0 – 2	Global	Taguig
19:30 PST		Details; Report	Guisso (yellow card) 10' de Jong (yellow card) 35' (red card) 80' de Murga (yellow card) 40'; I. El Habbib 67'; Mv. Angeles (yellow card) 71'; Gündüzoglu 87'	Stadium: Emperador Stadium

April 25, 2013 11	Manila Nomads	0 – 4	Global	Taguig
19:30 PST	Lozano (yellow card) 22'; Connolly (yellow card) 33'; Hacker (yellow card) 52' (red card) 60'; Atangana Obama (yellow card) 86'	Details; Report	Gündüzoglu 16', 46'; Reichelt (yellow card) 31'; Yao (yellow card) 54'; I. El Habbib 58'; Mw. Angeles (yellow card) 60'; Beloya 78'	Stadium: Emperador Stadium

May 2, 2013 12	Green Archers United	0 – 4	Global	Taguig
19:30 PST	Johnson (yellow card) 53'; Hugo (yellow card) 65'	Details; Report	I. El Habbib 45+1', (yellow card) 61'; Mv. Angeles (yellow card) 53'; Christiaens 58'; Wolf 71' de Murga (yellow card) 78', (goal) 90+1'	Stadium: Emperador Stadium

May 14, 2013 13	Pachanga Diliman	0 – 3	Global	Taguig
17:15 PST	Appiah (yellow card) 39'; Ashime (yellow card) 52'; Cañedo (yellow card) 80'	Details; Report	I. El Habbib (yellow card) 40', (goal) 53' (pen.); Barbaso (yellow card) 75'; Mw. Angeles 83'; Rances 90+3' (o.g.)	Stadium: Emperador Stadium

May 23, 2013 14	Global	2 – 0	Philippine Air Force	Taguig
19:30 PST	Gündüzoglu (yellow card) 45'; Christiaens (yellow card) 49', (goal) 68'; Bahadoran 57'	Details; Report	Bebanco (yellow card) 13'; Martinez (yellow card) 19'; N. Leonora (red card) 45'	Stadium: Emperador Stadium

May 28, 2013 15	Stallion Sta. Lucia	1 – 2	Global	Taguig
19:30 PST	Sánchez (yellow card) 11'; Zaghi (yellow card) 21', (goal) 24'; Bonvehi (yellow card) 51'; Hyo-Il (yellow card) 90+2'	Details; Report	Starosta 54'; Guisso (yellow card) 61'; Kama (yellow card) 74'; I. El Habbib 78'	Stadium: Emperador Stadium

June 6, 2013 16	Global	0 – 2	Loyola	Taguig
19:30 PST	Yao (yellow card) 56' (yellow-red card) 90+1'; Reichelt (yellow card) 75'; Guisso (red card) 80'	Details; Report	Ar. del Rosario (yellow card) 22'; M. A. Hartmann 11'; Cuaresma (yellow card) 71'; P. Younghusband 72'; M. J. Hartmann (yellow card) 85'; Fadrigalan (yellow card) 90+3'	Stadium: Emperador Stadium

June 13, 2013 17	Global	2 – 3	Kaya	Taguig
19:30 PST	I. El Habbib 9', 36' de Jong (yellow card) 61' (yellow-red card) 77'	Details; Report	C. Greatwich 39'; J. Muñoz 56' de Murga 81' (o.g.); Sadeghi (yellow card) 83'; Zeleny (yellow card) 86'; McDaniel (yellow card) 90+4'	Stadium: Emperador Stadium

June 20, 2013 18	Global	3 – 0	Philippine Army	Taguig
19:30 PST	Bahadoran 17'; Barbaso 42', (yellow card) 69' de Murga 53'	Details	Troyo (yellow card) 3' dela Cruz (yellow card) 28'; Cain (yellow card) 74'	Stadium: Emperador Stadium

=== 2013 UFL Cup ===
==== Preseason ====
Team	Pld	W	D	L	GF	GA	GD	Pts
Global	4	4	0	0	27	3	+24	12
Green Archers United	4	3	0	1	14	5	+9	9
Union Internacional Manila	4	2	0	2	15	11	+4	6
Laos	4	1	0	3	5	23	−18	3
Manila All-Japan	4	0	0	4	2	24	−22	0

September 8, 2013 Group Stage	Global	8 – 0	Laos	Taguig
20:00 PST	Bahadoran 30' de Murga 34'; Guirado 36', 38'; Starosta 40'; Hoshide 42'; El Habbib 65'; Altiche 89'	Details		Stadium: Emperador Stadium

September 10, 2013 Group Stage	Green Archers United	1 – 2	Global	Taguig
21:00 PST	Caligdong 86'	Details	Hartmann 56'; Guirado 81'	Stadium: Emperador Stadium

September 14, 2013 Group Stage	Union	1 – 6	Global	Taguig
21:00 PST	Behgandom 83'	Details	Sánchez 1', 6', 29'; El Habbib 60', 86'; Altiche 70'	Stadium: Emperador Stadium

=== PFF National Men's Club Championship ===
January 13, 2013 Round of 16	Global	2 – 1	Manila Nomads	Manila
18:30 PST	de Murga 71'; Fogg 82' (o.g.)	Report; Details	Magassa 90+1' (pen.)	Stadium: Rizal Memorial Stadium

January 19, 2013 Quarterfinal round	Ceres	1 – 0	Global	Manila
16:00 PST	Long 12'	Details		Stadium: Rizal Memorial Stadium

=== Singapore Cup ===
June 1, 2013 Preliminary round	Warriors (Singapore)	0 – 2	(Philippines) Global	Singapore
19:30 SST		Details; Report	Bahadoran 33'; Robertson 37', (yellow card) 90' de Murga (yellow card) 41'; Hoshide (yellow card) 50'	Stadium: Choa Chu Kang Stadium; Attendance: 705; Referee: Ahmad A'Qashah

July 24, 2013 Quarterfinal round	Global (Philippines)	1 – 0	Brunei DPMM	Singapore
19:30 SST	Barbaso (yellow card) 32'; Sánchez (yellow card) 37', (goal) 90+6'; Yao (yellow card) 54'; Mulders (yellow card) 65'; Ochotorena (yellow card) 82'	Details; Report	Damit (yellow card) 34'; Salleh (yellow card) 40'; Rahman (yellow card) 43'; Azam (yellow card) 90+6'	Stadium: Jalan Besar Stadium; Attendance: 648; Referee: Sukhbir Singh

July 27, 2013 Quarterfinal round	Brunei DPMM	4 – 4 (4 – 5 agg.)	(Philippines) Global	Singapore
19:30 SST	Sahari (yellow card) 16'; Moreira (yellow card) 27', (goal) 85'; Damit (yellow card) 31' (yellow-red card) 87'; Tosi (yellow card) 44'; Rimkevičius 62', 82' dos Santos 69'	Details; Report	de Murga 20', 37', 45+1', (yellow card) 58'; Sánchez 55', (yellow card) 83'; Yao (yellow card) 82'; Sacapaño (yellow card) 90+3'	Stadium: Jalan Besar Stadium; Referee: Leow Thiam Hoe

October 1, 2013 Semifinal round	Tanjong Pagar (Singapore)	2 – 2	(Philippines) Global	Singapore
19:30 SST	Benahmed 30'; Zerka 49'	Report	Bahadoran 7'; Altiche 70'	Stadium: Queenstown Stadium; Referee: Ahmad A'Qashah

October 4, 2013 Semifinal round	Global (Philippines)	1 – 2 (3 – 4 agg.)	(Singapore) Tanjong Pagar	Singapore
19:30 SST	Zerka 72' (o.g.)	Report	Zerka 4', 58'	Stadium: Jalan Besar Stadium; Referee: Abdul Malik (Singapore)

=== AFC President's Cup ===
==== Group B ====
Team	Pld	W	D	L	GF	GA	GD	Pts
(Kyrgyzstan) Dordoi Bishkek	3	2	1	0	16	2	+14	7
(Pakistan) KRL	3	2	1	0	11	1	+10	7
(Philippines) Global	3	1	0	2	6	8	−2	3
(Bhutan) Yeedzin	3	0	0	3	0	22	−22	0

May 8, 2013 Group B	Global (Philippines)	5 – 0	(Bhutan) Yeedzin	Cebu City
19:30 PST	Reichelt 5' de Murga (yellow card) 6' (goal) 9'; Starosta 15'; Bahadoran 20'; Mw. Angeles 64'	Match Summary; Details; Report	Rabten (yellow card) 11'	Stadium: Cebu City Sports Complex; Attendance: 2,500; Referee: Mukhtar Al Yarimi (Yemen)

May 10, 2013 Group B	KRL (Pakistan)	2 – 0	(Philippines) Global	Cebu City
19:30 PST	Mehmood Khan 12'; Adil 76' (yellow card) 89'; Hanif (yellow card) 77'; Afridi (yellow card) 87'	Match Summary; Details; Report	Christiaens (yellow card) 29'; Reichelt (yellow card) 32' de Jong (yellow card) 45+1'	Stadium: Cebu City Sports Complex; Attendance: 4,352; Referee: Wang Di (China PR)

May 12, 2013 Group B	Global (Philippines)	1 – 6	(Kyrgyzstan) Dordoi Bishkek	Cebu City
19:30 PST	de Murga 9' (yellow card) 78'; Starosta (yellow card) 24'; Beloya (yellow card) 51'; Guirado (yellow card) 53'; Barbaso (yellow card) 57'	Match Summary; Details; Report	Murzaev 14', 25' (pen.), 55', 64'; Tetteh (yellow card) 22' (goal) 90+3'; Shamshiev 77'	Stadium: Cebu City Sports Complex; Attendance: 4,725; Referee: Nivon Robesh Gamini (Sri Lanka)

== Squad statistics ==
As of July 27, 2013

No.	Pos.	Name	League		PFF NMCC		UFL Cup		Asia		Others (Note: Other competitive competitions such as Singapore Cup.)		Total		Discipline	
No.	Pos.	Name	Apps	Goals	Apps	Goals	Apps	Goals	Apps	Goals	Apps	Goals	Apps	Goals	Yellow Card	Red Card
1	GK	(Philippines) Paolo Pascual	1	0	0	0	0	0	0	0	0	0	1	0	0	0
2	GK	(Ivory Coast) Moussa Sanogo (Note: Only played on the 2013 AFC President's Cup.)	0	0	0	0	0	0	3	0	0	0	3	0	0	0
3	DF	(Ivory Coast) Ange Guisso	14	1	2	0	0	0	0	0	3	0	19	1	4	1
4	MF	(Philippines) Niño Ochoterena	11	1	0	0	0	0	1	0	3	0	15	1	2	0
5	MF	(Philippines) Jeremy Theuer	5	0	0	0	0	0	0	0	0	0	5	0	0	0
6	MF	(Philippines) Matthew Uy (Note: Dropped on the club list after the transfer window.)	3	1	1	0	0	0	0	0	0	0	4	1	1	0
6	MF	(Philippines) Paul Mulders	0	0	0	0	0	0	0	0	2	0	2	0	1	0
7	DF	(Poland) Ben Starosta	15	3	0	0	0	0	3	1	3	0	21	4	3	0
8	MF	(Philippines) David Basa	0	0	0	0	0	0	0	0	0	0	0	0	0	0
8	FW	(Spain) Rufo Sánchez (Note: Loaned for 2013 Singapore Cup.)	0	0	0	0	0	0	0	0	2	2	2	2	2	0
8	MF	(Scotland) James Gardner	4	0	0	0	0	0	0	0	0	0	4	0	2	0
9	FW	(Philippines) Misagh Bahadoran	16	3	0	0	0	0	3	1	3	1	22	5	2	0
10	FW	(Sudan) Izzeldin El Habbib	16	13	2	0	0	0	0	0	0	0	18	13	5	0
11	MF	(England) Jordan Robertson (Note: Only played on the 2013 Singapore Cup.)	0	0	0	0	0	0	0	0	1	1	1	1	1	0
14	MF	(Philippines) Carli de Murga	16	3	2	1	0	0	3	2	3	3	24	9	8	0
15	DF	(Ghana) Valentine Kama	18	0	2	0	0	0	0	0	0	0	20	0	2	0
16	GK	(Ivory Coast) Roland Sadia	14	0	2	0	0	0	0	0	3	0	19	0	1	0
17	MF	(Philippines) Patrick Reichelt	11	4	2	0	0	0	3	1	0	0	16	5	7	0
18	MF	(Philippines) Aaron Altiche	6	0	0	0	0	0	3	0	1	0	10	0	0	0
22	GK	(Philippines) Eduardo Sacapaño	4	0	0	0	0	0	1	0	1	0	6	0	1	0
21	DF	(Philippines) Juan Luis Guirado	1	0	0	0	0	0	3	0	0	0	4	0	1	0
23	FW	(Philippines) Denis Wolf	6	1	1	0	0	0	2	0	0	0	9	1	0	0
24	MF	(Philippines) Marwin Angeles	11	1	2	0	0	0	3	0	2	0	18	1	2	0
25	MF	(Philippines) Marvin Angeles	16	2	2	0	0	0	2	0	3	0	23	2	3	0
28	MF	(Philippines) Jeffrey Christiaens	14	6	2	0	0	0	3	0	3	0	22	6	3	0
30	FW	(Philippines) Joshua Beloya	5	1	0	0	0	0	3	0	2	0	10	1	1	0
33	DF	(Ivory Coast) Delon Patrick Yao	15	1	2	0	0	0	0	0	2	0	19	1	10	1
55	MF	(Turkey) Koray Gündüzoglu	10	3	0	0	0	0	0	0	0	0	10	3	1	0
63	DF	(Philippines) Jerry Barbaso	18	1	2	0	0	0	3	0	3	0	26	1	4	0
77	MF	(Philippines) Jason de Jong	8	0	0	0	0	0	3	0	1	0	12	0	6	1
93	MF	(Japan) Yu Hoshide	17	0	1	0	0	0	0	0	1	0	19	0	1	0
–	DF	(Philippines) Lexter Maravilla^{,} (Note: Only played on the 2013 PFF National Men's Club Championship.)	0	0	1	0	0	0	0	0	0	0	1	0	1	0
–	DF	(Cameroon) Alex Obiang^{,}	0	0	2	0	0	0	0	0	0	0	2	0	1	0
