= 2004–05 SpVgg Greuther Fürth season =

Greuther Fürth
2004–05 season
- President: Helmut Hack
- Head coach: Benno Möhlmann
- Stadium: Sportpark Ronhof
- 2. Bundesliga: 5th
- DFB-Pokal: Second round
- Top goalscorer: League: Marcus Feinbier (9); All: Marcus Feinbier (10)

The 2004–05 SpVgg Greuther Fürth season was the club's 102nd season in existence and the club's eighth consecutive season in the top flight of German football. In addition to the domestic league, SpVgg Greuther Fürth participated in this season's edition of the DFB-Pokal. The season covers the period from 1 July 2004 to 30 June 2005.

== Pre-season and friendlies ==
Win Draw Loss

3 July 2004 Friendly	SpVgg Jahn Forchheim (Germany)	0–13	(Germany) Greuther Fürth
CEST (UTC+2)

4 July 2004 Friendly	SpVgg Erlangen (Germany)	0–9	(Germany) Greuther Fürth
CEST (UTC+2)

9 July 2004 Friendly	SV Bad Heilbrunn (Germany)	0–9	(Germany) Greuther Fürth
CEST (UTC+2)

11 July 2004 Friendly	TSV Neustadt/Aisch (Germany)	0–5	(Germany) Greuther Fürth
CEST (UTC+2)

18 July 2004 Friendly	TSV Crailsheim (Germany)	0–5	(Germany) Greuther Fürth
CEST (UTC+2)

21 July 2004 Friendly	FC 08 Villingen (Germany)	0–3	(Germany) Greuther Fürth
CEST (UTC+2)

24 July 2004 Kaiserstuhl-Cup	Bahlinger SC (Germany)	2–5	(Germany) Greuther Fürth
CEST (UTC+2)

25 July 2004 Kaiserstuhl-Cup	SC Freiburg (Germany)	0–1	(Germany) Greuther Fürth
CEST (UTC+2)

31 July 2004 Friendly	Greuther Fürth (Germany)	3–1	(Czech Republic) Slavia Prague
CEST (UTC+2)

7 October 2004 Friendly	Greuther Fürth (Germany)	1–0	(Germany) 1. FC Nürnberg
CEST (UTC+2)

5 January 2005 Friendly	Cádiz (Spain)	0–0	(Germany) Greuther Fürth	Spain
CEST (UTC+2)				Stadium: Novo Sancti Petri

11 January 2005 Friendly	Hannover 96 (Germany)	0–3	(Germany) Greuther Fürth
CEST (UTC+2)

13 January 2005 Friendly	Arminia Bielefeld (Germany)	1–1	(Germany) Greuther Fürth
CEST (UTC+2)

17 January 2005 Friendly	Kickers Offenbach (Germany)	1–0	(Germany) Greuther Fürth
CEST (UTC+2)

24 May 2005 Friendly	FC Strullendorf (Germany)	1–7	(Germany) Greuther Fürth
19:00 CEST (UTC+2)

== Competitions ==
=== Overview ===
Competition	First match	Last match	Starting round	Final position	Record							
Competition	First match	Last match	Starting round	Final position	Pld	W	D	L	GF	GA	GD	Win %
2. Bundesliga	8 August 2004	22 May 2005	Matchday 1	5th	34	17	5	12	51	42	+9	50.00
DFB-Pokal	21 August 2004	22 September 2004	First round	Second round	2	1	0	1	4	5	−1	50.00
Total					36	18	5	13	55	47	+8	50.00

Source: Competitions

=== 2. Bundesliga ===
==== League table ====
Pos	Team	Pld	W	D	L	GF	GA	GD	Pts	Promotion or relegation
3	Eintracht Frankfurt (P)	34	19	4	11	65	39	+26	61	Promotion to Bundesliga
4	1860 Munich	34	15	12	7	52	39	+13	57	
5	SpVgg Greuther Fürth	34	17	5	12	51	42	+9	56	
6	Alemannia Aachen	34	16	6	12	60	40	+20	54	
7	Erzgebirge Aue	34	15	6	13	49	40	+9	51	

Source: Bundesliga.de
Rules for classification: 1) points; 2) goal difference; 3) number of goals scored.
(P) Promoted

==== Results summary ====
Overall								Home						Away					
Pld	W	D	L	GF	GA	GD	Pts	W	D	L	GF	GA	GD	W	D	L	GF	GA	GD
34	17	5	12	51	42	+9	56	11	2	4	30	20	+10	6	3	8	21	22	−1

Source: DFB

==== Results by round ====
Round	1	2	3	4	5	6	7	8	9	10	11	12	13	14	15	16	17	18	19	20	21	22	23	24	25	26	27	28	29	30	31	32	33	34
Ground	H	A	H	A	H	A	H	A	H	A	H	A	H	A	H	A	H	A	H	A	H	A	H	A	H	A	H	A	H	A	H	A	H	A
Result	W	W	W	D	W	L	W	W	W	D	L	D	W	L	W	L	W	W	W	L	D	W	L	L	D	L	W	L	L	L	W	W	L	W
Position	4	2	1	1	1	1	1	1	1	1	1	3	3	3	2	4	3	3	2	3	3	2	3	3	3	3	3	4	5	7	6	5	6	5

Source: DFB
A = Away; H = Home; W = Win; D = Draw; L = Loss

==== Matches ====
8 August 2004 1	Greuther Fürth	1–0	LR Ahlen	Fürth
15:00 CEST (UTC+2)				Stadium: Sportpark Ronhof

15 August 2004 2	SpVgg Unterhaching	1–2	Greuther Fürth	Unterhaching
15:00 CET (UTC+1)

29 August 2004 3	Greuther Fürth	1–0	Erzgebirge Aue	Fürth
15:00 CEST (UTC+2)				Stadium: Sportpark Ronhof

12 September 2004 4	Eintracht Trier	0–0	Greuther Fürth	Trier
15:00 CET (UTC+1)

19 September 2004 5	Greuther Fürth	2–0	Rot-Weiß Erfurt	Fürth
15:00 CEST (UTC+2)				Stadium: Sportpark Ronhof

26 September 2004 6	MSV Duisburg	1–0	Greuther Fürth	Duisburg
15:00 CET (UTC+1)

3 October 2004 7	Greuther Fürth	2–0	Energie Cottbus	Fürth
15:00 CEST (UTC+2)				Stadium: Sportpark Ronhof

17 October 2004 8	Wacker Burghausen	0–1	Greuther Fürth	Burghausen
15:00 CET (UTC+1)

22 October 2004 9	Greuther Fürth	2–1	Eintracht Frankfurt	Fürth
19:00 CEST (UTC+2)				Stadium: Sportpark Ronhof

26 October 2004 10	Karlsruher SC	2–2	Greuther Fürth	Karlsruhe
17:30 CET (UTC+1)

29 October 2004 11	Greuther Fürth	0–1	1. FC Köln	Fürth
19:00 CEST (UTC+2)				Stadium: Sportpark Ronhof

7 November 2004 12	Dynamo Dresden	2–2	Greuther Fürth	Dresden
15:00 CET (UTC+1)

12 November 2004 13	Greuther Fürth	2–0	1. FC Saarbrücken	Fürth
19:00 CET (UTC+1)				Stadium: Sportpark Ronhof

19 November 2004 14	Rot-Weiß Oberhausen	1–0	Greuther Fürth	Oberhausen
19:00 CET (UTC+1)

28 November 2004 15	Greuther Fürth	3–2	Rot-Weiss Essen	Fürth
15:00 CET (UTC+1)				Stadium: Sportpark Ronhof

6 December 2004 16	1860 Munich	2–1	Greuther Fürth	Munich
20:15 CET (UTC+1)

10 December 2004 17	Greuther Fürth	3–2	Alemannia Aachen	Fürth
19:00 CET (UTC+1)				Stadium: Sportpark Ronhof

23 January 2005 18	LR Ahlen	2–4	Greuther Fürth	Ahlen
15:00 CET (UTC+1)

30 January 2005 19	Greuther Fürth	3–1	SpVgg Unterhaching	Fürth
15:00 CET (UTC+1)				Stadium: Sportpark Ronhof

6 February 2005 20	Erzgebirge Aue	2–1	Greuther Fürth	Aue
15:00 CET (UTC+1)

13 February 2005 21	Greuther Fürth	3–3	Eintracht Trier	Fürth
15:00 CET (UTC+1)				Stadium: Sportpark Ronhof

20 February 2005 22	Rot-Weiß Erfurt	1–2	Greuther Fürth	Erfurt
15:00 CET (UTC+1)

28 February 2005 23	Greuther Fürth	1–3	MSV Duisburg	Fürth
20:15 CET (UTC+1)				Stadium: Sportpark Ronhof

6 March 2005 24	Energie Cottbus	2–0	Greuther Fürth	Cottbus
15:00 CET (UTC+1)

21 March 2005 26	Eintracht Frankfurt	1–0	Greuther Fürth	Frankfurt
20:15 CET (UTC+1)

3 April 2005 27	Greuther Fürth	1–0	Karlsruher SC	Fürth
15:00 CEST (UTC+2)				Stadium: Sportpark Ronhof

6 April 2005 25	Greuther Fürth	1–1	Wacker Burghausen	Fürth
18:15 CEST (UTC+2)				Stadium: Sportpark Ronhof

11 April 2005 28	1. FC Köln	3–2	Greuther Fürth	Cologne
20:15 CEST (UTC+2)

15 April 2005 29	Greuther Fürth	0–1	Dynamo Dresden	Fürth
19:00 CEST (UTC+2)				Stadium: Sportpark Ronhof

24 April 2005 30	1. FC Saarbrücken	2–1	Greuther Fürth	Saarbrücken
15:00 CEST (UTC+2)

29 April 2005 31	Greuther Fürth	3–2	Rot-Weiß Oberhausen	Fürth
19:00 CEST (UTC+2)				Stadium: Sportpark Ronhof

8 May 2005 32	Rot-Weiss Essen	0–2	Greuther Fürth	Essen
15:00 CEST (UTC+2)

15 May 2005 33	Greuther Fürth	2–3	1860 Munich	Fürth
15:00 CEST (UTC+2)				Stadium: Sportpark Ronhof

22 May 2005 34	Alemannia Aachen	0–1	Greuther Fürth	Aachen
15:00 CEST (UTC+2)

=== DFB-Pokal ===
21 August 2004 First round	FC Carl Zeiss Jena	1–2 (a.e.t.)	Greuther Fürth	Jena
18:00 CEST (UTC+2)	Zimmermann 89'		Westermann 86'; Feinbier 107'	Stadium: Ernst-Abbe-Sportfeld; Attendance: 4,100; Referee: Michael Weiner

22 September 2004 Second round	Eintracht Frankfurt	4–2 (a.e.t.)	Greuther Fürth	Frankfurt
18:00 CEST (UTC+2)	Wiedener 14'; Lenze 76'; Meier 103'; Cha Du-ri 110'		Fuchs 34'; Rösler 85'	Stadium: Waldstadion; Attendance: 9,300; Referee: Manuel Gräfe
