= Alexander Huber (footballer) =

Tajikistani footballer (born 1985)

Personal information
- Full name: Aleksander Khuber
- Date of birth: 25 February 1985 (age 41)
- Place of birth: Leninabad, Tajik SSR, Soviet Union
- Height: 1.73 m (5 ft 8 in)
- Position: Defender

Youth career
- 1993: Khujand
- 1993–1999: VfL Neustadt
- 1999–2004: Eintracht Frankfurt

Senior career*
| Years | Team | Apps | (Gls) |
| 2004–2006 | Eintracht Frankfurt | 10 | (0) |
| 2005 | → 1899 Hoffenheim (loan) | 11 | (0) |
| 2007 | Eintracht Braunschweig | 17 | (0) |
| 2007–2008 | Hamburger SV II | 25 | (0) |
| 2008–2011 | Kickers Offenbach | 90 | (4) |
| 2011–2016 | FSV Frankfurt | 158 | (1) |
| Total | | 311 | (5) |

International career
| 2004–2005 | Germany U-20 | 9 | (1) |
| 2006 | Germany B | 1 | (0) |
| 2017 | Tajikistan | 1 | (0) |
- * Club domestic league appearances and goals

Alexander Huber (Cyrillic: Александр Хубер, romanized: Aleksandr Khuber; born 25 February 1985) is a Tajikistani retired professional footballer who played as a defender.

== Early life ==
Huber was born in Leninabad of the Soviet Union and came in 1989 to Neustadt by Marburg in Germany.

== Club career ==
Huber began his career in 1993 with his birth club, Khujand. He also began his career in late 1993 with his home town club VfL Neustadt. In summer 1999, he was scouted by Eintracht Frankfurt, where promoted in 2004 to the first team. After seven games in his first season in the 2. Bundesliga, he was loaned out in January 2006 to Regionalliga West/Südwest club TSG 1899 Hoffenheim. He played six matches for Hoffenheim until the end of the season. He returned to Eintracht Frankfurt in summer 2006 and played until December 2006 for the team before being transferred to Eintracht Braunschweig. After Braunschweig's relegation he was unattached and trained at his old club in Frankfurt until he was signed by the Hamburger SV reserve team. After one year with Hamburger SV II, he signed in summer 2008 for Kickers Offenbach.

In the summer of 2017, Huber announced his retirement from football.

== International career ==
Huber played nine games and scored one goal for the Germany U-20 national team. He played for the team at the 2005 FIFA World Youth Championship in the Netherlands, and later marked a game for the Germany Team 2006. He also holds a Tadjik passport.

On 2 June 2017, Huber was called up to the Tajikistan national team for the first time, for their 2019 AFC Asian Cup qualification Third Round match against the Philippines on 13 June 2017, making his debut playing the first 45 minutes of the game.

== Career statistics ==
=== Club ===
Appearances and goals by club, season and competition
| Club | Season | League | | | National Cup | | Continental | | Total | |
| Club | Season | Division | Apps | Goals | Apps | Goals | Apps | Goals | Apps | Goals |
|---|---|---|---|---|---|---|---|---|---|---|
| Eintracht Frankfurt | 2004–05 | 2. Bundesliga | 7 | 0 | 0 | 0 | — | | 7 | 0 |
| Eintracht Frankfurt | 2005–06 | Bundesliga | 0 | 0 | 0 | 0 | — | | 0 | 0 |
| Eintracht Frankfurt | 2006–07 | Bundesliga | 3 | 0 | 1 | 0 | 1 | 1 | 5 | 1 |
| Eintracht Frankfurt | Total | | 10 | 0 | 1 | 0 | 1 | 1 | 12 | 1 |
| 1899 Hoffenheim (loan) | 2005–06 | Regionalliga Süd | 11 | 0 | 0 | 0 | — | | 11 | 0 |
| Eintracht Braunschweig | 2006–07 | 2. Bundesliga | 17 | 0 | 0 | 0 | — | | 17 | 0 |
| Hamburger SV II | 2007–08 | Regionalliga Nord | 25 | 0 | 0 | 0 | — | | 25 | 0 |
| Kickers Offenbach | 2008–09 | 3. Liga | 37 | 1 | 2 | 0 | — | | 39 | 1 |
| Kickers Offenbach | 2009–10 | 3. Liga | 37 | 2 | 1 | 0 | — | | 38 | 2 |
| Kickers Offenbach | 2010–11 | 3. Liga | 16 | 1 | 1 | 0 | — | | 17 | 1 |
| Kickers Offenbach | Total | | 90 | 4 | 4 | 0 | — | | 94 | 4 |
| FSV Frankfurt | 2011–12 | 2. Bundesliga | 28 | 0 | 2 | 0 | — | | 30 | 0 |
| FSV Frankfurt | 2012–13 | 2. Bundesliga | 32 | 0 | 1 | 0 | — | | 33 | 0 |
| FSV Frankfurt | 2013–14 | 2. Bundesliga | 33 | 1 | 2 | 0 | — | | 35 | 1 |
| FSV Frankfurt | 2014–15 | 2. Bundesliga | 33 | 0 | 2 | 0 | — | | 35 | 0 |
| FSV Frankfurt | 2015–16 | 2. Bundesliga | 31 | 0 | 1 | 0 | — | | 32 | 0 |
| FSV Frankfurt | Total | | 157 | 1 | 8 | 0 | — | | 165 | 1 |
| Career total | | | 310 | 5 | 13 | 0 | 1 | 1 | 324 | 6 |

=== International ===
Appearances and goals by national team and year
| National team | Year | Apps | Goals |
|---|---|---|---|
| Tajikistan | 2017 | 1 | 0 |
| Total | | 1 | 0 |
