= 2004–05 2. Bundesliga =

31st season of the second-tier football league in Germany

2. Bundesliga
- Season: 2004–05
- Champions: 1. FC Köln
- Promoted: 1. FC Köln; MSV Duisburg; Eintracht Frankfurt
- Relegated: Eintracht Trier; Rot-Weiß Oberhausen; Rot-Weiss Essen; Rot-Weiß Erfurt
- Matches played: 306
- Goals scored: 842 (2.75 per match)
- Top goalscorer: Lukas Podolski (24)

The 2004–05 2. Bundesliga was the 31st season of the 2. Bundesliga, the second tier of the German football league system. 1. FC Köln, MSV Duisburg and Eintracht Frankfurt were promoted to the Bundesliga while Eintracht Trier, Rot-Weiß Oberhausen, Rot-Weiss Essen and Rot-Weiß Erfurt were relegated to the Regionalliga.

== League table ==
For the 2004–05 season Rot-Weiß Erfurt, 1. FC Saarbrücken, Rot-Weiss Essen and Dynamo Dresden were newly promoted to the 2. Bundesliga from the Regionalliga while Eintracht Frankfurt, TSV 1860 Munich and 1. FC Köln had been relegated to the league from the Bundesliga.

Locations of the participating teams of the 2004–05 season

Pos	Team	Pld	W	D	L	GF	GA	GD	Pts	Promotion or relegation
1	1. FC Köln (C, P)	34	20	7	7	62	33	+29	67	Promotion to Bundesliga
2	MSV Duisburg (P)	34	19	5	10	50	37	+13	62	Promotion to Bundesliga
3	Eintracht Frankfurt (P)	34	19	4	11	65	39	+26	61	Promotion to Bundesliga
4	1860 Munich	34	15	12	7	52	39	+13	57	
5	SpVgg Greuther Fürth	34	17	5	12	51	42	+9	56	
6	Alemannia Aachen	34	16	6	12	60	40	+20	54	
7	Erzgebirge Aue	34	15	6	13	49	40	+9	51	
8	Dynamo Dresden	34	15	4	15	48	53	−5	49	
9	Wacker Burghausen	34	13	9	12	48	55	−7	48	
10	SpVgg Unterhaching	34	14	3	17	40	43	−3	45	
11	Karlsruher SC	34	11	10	13	46	47	−1	43	
12	1. FC Saarbrücken	34	11	7	16	44	50	−6	40	
13	LR Ahlen	34	10	9	15	43	49	−6	39	
14	Energie Cottbus	34	10	9	15	35	48	−13	39	
15	Eintracht Trier (R)	34	9	12	13	39	53	−14	39	Relegation to Regionalliga (Note: Rot-Weiss Essen, Rot-Weiß Erfurt and Rot-Weiß Oberhausen were relegated to Regionalliga Nord. Eintracht Trier was relegated to Regionalliga Süd.)
16	Rot-Weiß Oberhausen (R)	34	8	10	16	40	62	−22	34	Relegation to Regionalliga
17	Rot-Weiss Essen (R)	34	6	15	13	35	51	−16	33	Relegation to Regionalliga
18	Rot-Weiß Erfurt (R)	34	7	9	18	34	60	−26	30	Relegation to Regionalliga

Source: Bundesliga.de
Rules for classification: 1) points; 2) goal difference; 3) number of goals scored.
(C) Champions; (P) Promoted; (R) Relegated

== Results ==
Home \ Away	AAC	LRA	AUE	WBU	FCE	SGD	DUI	ERF	RWE	SGE	SGF	KSC	KOE	M60	RWO	FCS	TRI	UNT
Alemannia Aachen	—	0–2	1–5	3–1	4–0	5–1	0–0	5–1	1–1	1–1	0–1	4–0	2–3	5–1	2–1	3–1	2–0	2–3
LR Ahlen	1–1	—	1–2	1–3 (Note: The LR Ahlen v Wacker Burghausen match from 22 October 2004, which finished with a score of 1–0, was annulled by the DFB on 15 February 2005 and was required to be replayed due to match fixing by referee Robert Hoyzer. The replay took place on 27 April 2005 and finished with a score of 1–3.)	3–1	2–0	2–0	2–3	3–1	3–2	2–4	2–2	1–0	1–0	0–1	2–3	2–2	1–2
Erzgebirge Aue	1–1	0–0	—	2–0	2–0	4–1	1–3	3–2	1–1	0–5	2–1	1–0	1–2	3–1	2–0	2–0	1–2	1–0
Wacker Burghausen	2–3	1–0	2–2	—	0–0	2–1	0–0	0–2	3–2	0–3	0–1	1–1	4–2	0–3	2–2	1–2	0–0	2–0
Energie Cottbus	1–2	0–0	1–0	0–2	—	2–1	1–0	3–0	0–0	0–3	2–0	4–1	3–5	1–1	1–0	1–1	2–1	0–0
Dynamo Dresden	2–0	3–1	1–0	1–1	0–1	—	3–1	2–1	1–0	2–1	2–2	1–2	2–1	0–4	3–1	2–1	4–1	1–0
MSV Duisburg	1–0	1–0	1–1	4–3	2–0	4–2	—	4–0	1–0	1–1	1–0	1–4	1–0	0–1	4–1	2–1	4–3	3–1
Rot-Weiß Erfurt	1–0	1–1	0–3	1–0	3–3	1–1	0–0	—	1–1	0–3	1–2	4–2	0–1	0–0	1–1	0–1	3–0	0–2 (Note: The Rot-Weiß Erfurt v SpVgg Unterhaching match from 6 April 2005, which finished with a score of 2–0, was later awarded to SpVgg Unterhaching with a score of 0–2 due to Rot-Weiß Erfurt player Senad Tiganj testing positive for doping.)
Rot-Weiss Essen	0–2	1–0	1–5	1–2	4–2	2–1	1–0	0–0	—	4–4	0–2	2–1	2–2	0–0	2–2	2–0	2–2	0–1
Eintracht Frankfurt	1–0	2–3	2–0	3–0	3–1	2–1	0–1	2–1	1–0	—	1–0	2–1	1–0	1–2	6–2	3–0	2–0	3–0
Greuther Fürth	3–2	1–0	1–0	1–1	2–0	0–1	1–3	2–0	3–2	2–1	—	1–0	0–1	2–3	3–2	2–0	3–3	3–1
Karlsruher SC	0–1	0–0	0–1	1–1	3–2	1–1	0–3	2–0	4–1	3–0	2–2	—	0–1	1–1	3–0	1–1	1–0	1–0
1. FC Köln	1–0	3–0	1–0	8–1	0–0	3–2	4–0	1–1	0–0	2–0	3–2	2–2	—	2–0	3–2	3–1	1–2	1–0
1860 Munich	3–0	3–4	1–0	2–4	1–0	2–0	1–0	3–1	0–0	2–1	2–1	1–1	0–0	—	5–1	1–1	2–0	2–2
Rot-Weiß Oberhausen	0–0	2–2	1–1	1–2	0–1	2–0	0–2	4–3	1–1	0–3	1–0	1–0	0–3	0–0	—	3–0	1–1	3–1
1. FC Saarbrücken	1–2	0–0	2–1	2–4	0–0	0–1	4–1	0–2	0–0	3–0	2–1	3–4	2–0	4–1	3–0	—	1–1	0–1
Eintracht Trier	0–4	2–0	1–0	0–2	2–1	2–4	1–0	2–0	1–1	2–2	0–0	0–2	0–0	2–2	2–2	2–1	—	2–0
SpVgg Unterhaching	0–2	2–1	4–1	0–1	2–1	1–0	0–1	4–0	4–0	2–0	1–2	2–0	1–3	1–1	0–2	1–3	1–0	—

Source: DFB
Legend: Blue = home team win; Yellow = draw; Red = away team win.

== Top scorers ==
The league's top scorers:

Goals	Player	Team
24	(Germany) Lukas Podolski	1. FC Köln
17	(Morocco) Abdelaziz Ahanfouf	MSV Duisburg
17	(Slovenia) Klemen Lavrič	Dynamo Dresden
16	(Spain) Francisco Copado	SpVgg Unterhaching
16	(Netherlands) Arie van Lent	Eintracht Frankfurt
15	(Czech Republic) Michal Kolomazník	TSV 1860 Munich
15	(Germany) Stefan Reisinger	SV Wacker Burghausen
13	(Germany) Nico Patschinski	SV Eintracht Trier 05
12	(Slovakia) Henrich Benčík	1. FC Saarbrücken
11	(Germany) Markus Kurth	MSV Duisburg
11	(Germany) Kai Michalke	Alemannia Aachen
11	(Germany) Matthias Scherz	1. FC Köln
11	(Bosnia and Herzegovina) Stanko Svitlica	LR Ahlen
