= Denis Wolf =

Former association football player

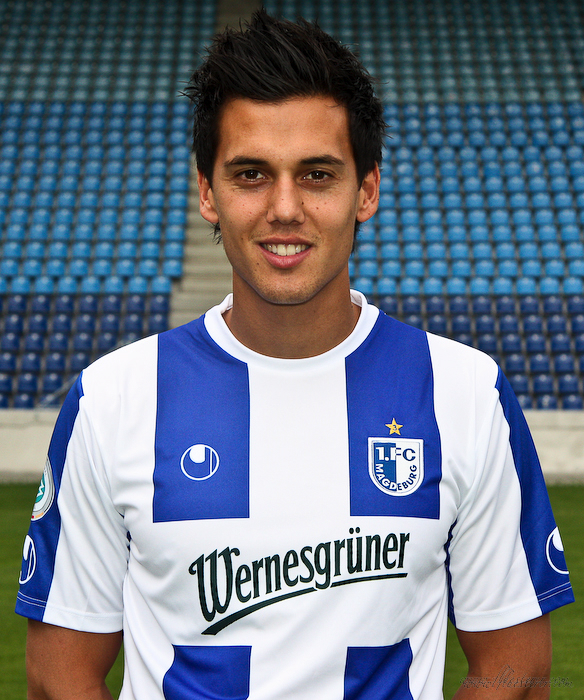
- Wolf with 1. FC Magdeburg

Personal information
- Full name: Denis Santos Wolf
- Date of birth: 15 January 1983 (age 43)
- Place of birth: Hanover, West Germany
- Height: 1.82 m (6 ft 0 in)
- Position: Forward

Youth career
- –2001: Germania Grasdorf
- 2001–2002: Hannover 96

Senior career*
Years	Team	Apps	(Gls)
2002–2005	Hannover 96 II	20	(7)
2003	Hannover 96	4	(1)
2005–2006	→ Fortuna Düsseldorf (loan)	31	(5)
2006–2007	Fortuna Düsseldorf	24	(2)
2007–2009	Rot-Weiß Erfurt	56	(12)
2009–2012	1. FC Magdeburg	64	(12)
2012	Global FC	6	(1)
2013–2016	TSV Havelse	73	(18)
Total		278	(58)

International career
2012	Philippines	15	(5)
- * Club domestic league appearances and goals

Denis Santos Wolf (born 15 January 1983) is a former professional footballer who played as a forward. Born in Hanover, Germany, he has played for Hannover 96 and Fortuna Düsseldorf. Through his Filipino-born mother, he represented the Philippines national team in the 2012 AFF Championship.

== Club career ==
Wolf started as a youth at Germania Grasdorf and then moved to Hannover 96 in 2001. After playing for the youth team, he mainly played for the reserve side in the Oberliga. In 2003, he managed to break into the first team making four appearances and scored one goal in the Bundesliga within the first half of the 2003–04 season.

In early June 2005, Wolf joined Fortuna Düsseldorf on loan for the 2005–06 season after only four seasons with Hannover. He would end up signing for the club permanently in July 2006.

He then moved to rivals Rot-Weiß Erfurt for the 2007–08 season, spending two season with the club being a regular, making 56 appearances and scoring 12 goals. He eventually moved to Magdeburg in 2009.

However, in August 2009, he underwent knee surgery which kept him out until December. He made his debut for Magdeburg on 14 February 2010 against Türkiyemspor Berlin, but was substituted after only 15 minutes.

Following a dismal 2011–12 season where 1.FC Magdeburg saw themselves in 18th and last place in the Regionalliga Nord, on 20 May 2012, the management decided to release almost a dozen players, including Wolf, to begin rebuilding as quickly as possible.

In September 2012, it was announced that Wolf has signed with Filipino side Global FC.

== International career ==
Being of Filipino descent, Wolf expressed his desire to represent the Philippines internationally. In mid-January 2012, he arrived in Manila to link up with the Philippines national football team ahead of the 2012 AFC Challenge Cup and made his unofficial debut against Korean side Icheon Citizen FC. He continued to make unofficial appearances for the Philippines when he joined the team in their Mideast tour in mid-February which also saw him score against Qatari side Al Ahli. On 29 February 2012, he got his official debut in a friendly match against Malaysia, scoring in the Philippines' only goal, before Malaysia managed to get an equalizer in second half. injury time. On 27 September 2012, he then scored his first international hat-trick in a 5–0 win against Macau. On 29 September 2012, scored the first goal in a 3–1 win against Chinese Taipei national football team.

Later that year, he was part of the Philippines squad that competed at the AFF Suzuki Cup. He made two appearances in the group stage as they reached the knockout round. He then came on as sub in the semi-final second-leg against Singapore as they lost 1–0 which was also the final aggregate score. It proved to be Wolf's final appearance for the Philippines.

== International goals ==
No.	Date	Venue	Opponent	Score	Result	Competition
1.	29 February 2012	Rizal Memorial Stadium, Manila, Philippines	Malaysia	1–0	1–1	Friendly
2.	27 September 2012	Rizal Memorial Stadium, Manila, Philippines	Macau	1–0	5–0	2012 Philippine Peace Cup
3.	27 September 2012	Rizal Memorial Stadium, Manila, Philippines	Macau	2–0	5–0	2012 Philippine Peace Cup
4.	27 September 2012	Rizal Memorial Stadium, Manila, Philippines	Macau	3–0	5–0	2012 Philippine Peace Cup
5.	29 September 2012	Rizal Memorial Stadium, Manila, Philippines	Chinese Taipei	1–0	3–1	2012 Philippine Peace Cup
