= Joshua Grenier =

American soccer player

Personal information
- Date of birth: July 16, 1979 (age 47)
- Place of birth: Manchester, New Hampshire, U.S.
- Height: 1.86 m (6 ft 1 in)
- Position: Defender

Youth career
- –1998: New Hampshire College
- 1998–2002: Clayton State University

Senior career*
Years	Team	Apps	(Gls)
2003–2008	TuS Koblenz		
- * Club domestic league appearances and goals

Joshua Grenier (born July 16, 1979) is an American retired soccer player. He played college soccer New Hampshire College (now Southern New Hampshire University) and Clayton State University. He last played for TuS Koblenz in Germany's second division, the 2. Bundesliga. He played as a central defender.

Grenier made over 100 competitive appearances for Koblenz from 2003 until 2008.
