= Jerry Barbaso =

Filipino footballer

Personal information
- Full name: Jerry Sardua Barbaso I
- Date of birth: 18 April 1988 (age 38)
- Place of birth: Dipolog, Philippines
- Height: 1.67 m (5 ft 6 in)
- Position: Defender

Senior career*
Years	Team	Apps	(Gls)
2009–2010	Laos		
2009–2018	Global	40	(0)
2018	Ceres–Negros	3	(0)
2019–2020	Global Makati	16	(1)
2020	Maharlika Manila	5	(0)

International career^{‡}
2011	Philippines U-23		
2010	Philippines		
- * Club domestic league appearances and goals ‡ National team caps and goals as of 14 August 2013

Jerry Sardua Barbaso (born 18 April 1988) is a Filipino footballer who plays as a defender for Philippines Football League club Maharlika Manila and the Philippines national team.

== Early life ==
Barbaso was born into an ethnic Cebuano family in Dipolog. Barbaso's father died when he was four. His father's name was Jerry Sr. and his older brother's name is Jerry Jr.

He started playing football at the age of 13. Barbaso graduated from DMC-College Foundation with a degree in managerial accounting in 2009, the same year that he started playing professionally.

== Club career ==
Barbaso first professionally played in the United Football League with Laos. He then played for Global Cebu in the Philippines Football League until 2018, when he moved to Ceres–Negros.

In 2020, Barbaso joined Maharlika F.C.

== International career ==
Barboso made his international debut in the 2010 Long Teng Cup. Barboso was one of the two overage players chosen for the 2012 Hassanal Bolkiah Trophy, where he also captained the team. In August 2013, Barbaso was selected to play in a friendly match against Indonesia. He made his debut coming on for Carli De Murga in an eventual 2–0 defeat.

== Personal life ==
Barboso is good friends with Yu Hoshide, and is known by teammates as a very sociable person. His number, 63, is testament to his nickname "sixto" which he earned in college. He is also well known for his long, curly "afro" hair which he sometimes ties in a ponytail.

== Honors ==
=== National team ===
- Philippine Peace Cup: 2013

== Career statistics ==
=== Club ===
Club	Season	League			Cup		Continental		Other		Total	
Club	Season	Division	Apps	Goals	Apps	Goals	Apps	Goals	Apps	Goals	Apps	Goals
Global Cebu	2017	PFL	31	0	–		10	0	6	0	47	0
Global Cebu	2018	PFL	9	0	–		6	0	–		15	0
Ceres–Negros	2018	PFL	5	0	3	0	–		–		8	0
Global Makati	2019	PFL	16	1	–		–		–		16	1
Maharlika Manila	2020	PFL	5	0	–		–		–		5	0
Career total			66	1	3	0	16	0	6	0	91	1
