= Markus Husterer =

German footballer

Personal information
- Date of birth: 16 June 1983 (age 43)
- Place of birth: Ingolstadt, West Germany
- Height: 1.85 m (6 ft 1 in)
- Position: Defender

Youth career
- 1989–1993: FC Böhmfeld
- 1993–1997: MTV Ingolstadt
- 1997–2001: Bayern Munich

Senior career*
Years	Team	Apps	(Gls)
2001–2006	Bayern Munich II	70	(3)
2003–2004	→ VfB Stuttgart (loan)	2	(0)
2004–2005	→ Eintracht Frankfurt (loan)	17	(0)
2006–2007	Eintracht Braunschweig	27	(0)
2007–2010	FSV Frankfurt	42	(2)
2010–2013	Kickers Offenbach	79	(8)
2015–2016	Alemannia Klein-Auheim		
Total		237	(13)

Managerial career
- 2015–2016: Alemannia Klein-Auheim (assistant)
- * Club domestic league appearances and goals

Markus Husterer (born 16 June 1983 in Ingolstadt) is a retired German footballer.
