= Torben Hoffmann =

German footballer

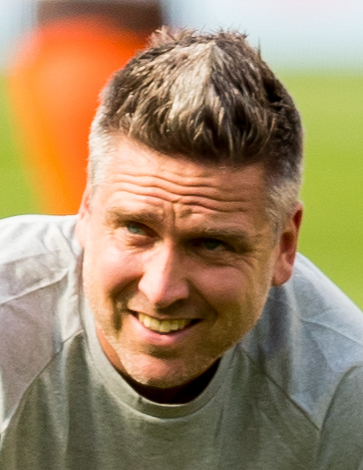
- Hoffmann in 2019

Personal information
- Date of birth: 27 October 1974 (age 52)
- Place of birth: Kiel, West Germany
- Height: 1.89 m (6 ft 2 in)
- Position: Defender

Youth career
- –1993: Schwarz-Weiß Elmschenhagen
- 1993–1995: Holstein Kiel

Senior career*
Years	Team	Apps	(Gls)
1995–1997	VfB Lübeck	54	(1)
1997–1999	SC Freiburg	53	(4)
1999–2000	Bayer Leverkusen	19	(0)
2001–2004	1860 Munich	92	(1)
2004–2005	Eintracht Frankfurt	29	(4)
2005–2010	1860 Munich	132	(10)
2010–2011	SpVgg Unterhaching	21	(3)
Total		400	(23)

International career
	Germany B	2	(0)
- * Club domestic league appearances and goals

Torben Hoffmann (born 27 October 1974) is a German former professional footballer who played as a defender.

Hoffmann works as a field reporter for Sky Sport News HD as a field reporter in Southern Germany and Austria.

Hoffmann is married with two daughters. The family resides in Munich.
