= Eduard Sacapaño =

Filipino footballer (born 1980)

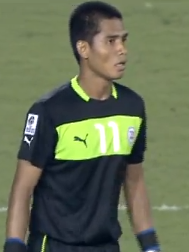

Personal information
- Full name: Eduard Ortalla Sacapaño
- Date of birth: 14 February 1980 (age 46)
- Place of birth: Bago, Negros Occidental, Philippines
- Height: 1.73 m (5 ft 8 in)
- Position: Goalkeeper

Team information
- Current team: One Taguig (goalkeeping coach)

Youth career
- West Negros College

Senior career*
Years	Team	Apps	(Gls)
2004–2014	Philippine Army G.T.I		(0)
2013–2014	→ Global (loan)	1	(0)
2014	→ Ceres (loan)		(0)
2014–2019	Ceres–Negros		(0)
2024	One Taguig	1	(0)

International career
2006–2013	Philippines	35	(0)

Managerial career
- 2019-2023: Ceres-Negros (goalkeeping coach)
- 2023: Azkals Development Team (goalkeeping coach)
- 2023–: Philippines (goalkeeping coach)
- 2024–: One Taguig (goalkeeping coach)
- * Club domestic league appearances and goals

Eduard Ortalla Sacapaño (born 14 February 1980) is a Filipino former professional footballer who played as a goalkeeper. He is the current goalkeeping coach of the Philippines national football team and One Taguig.

== Early years ==
Sacapaño was born in Bago. He started playing football at the age of 13. Sacapaño later joined the West Negros College varsity football team, where he took the role of a goalkeeper. He then joined the Philippine Army and became part of its team that saw action in the United Football League.

== Career ==
In March 2013, to boost Global FC's preparation for the 2013 AFC President's Cup, Sacapaño was sent to the club on loan.

He became part of the Philippine national football team in 2006. He was notable for the national team after playing against the Los Angeles Galaxy and CF Internacional de Madrid.

== Honours ==
Global FC

- UFL Division 1 Runner-up: 2013

Philippines

- Philippine Peace Cup: 2012, 2013
- AFC Challenge Cup Third place: 2012

Individual

- Philippine Peace Cup Best Goalkeeper Award: 2012
