= Christopher Reinhard =

German footballer (born 1985)

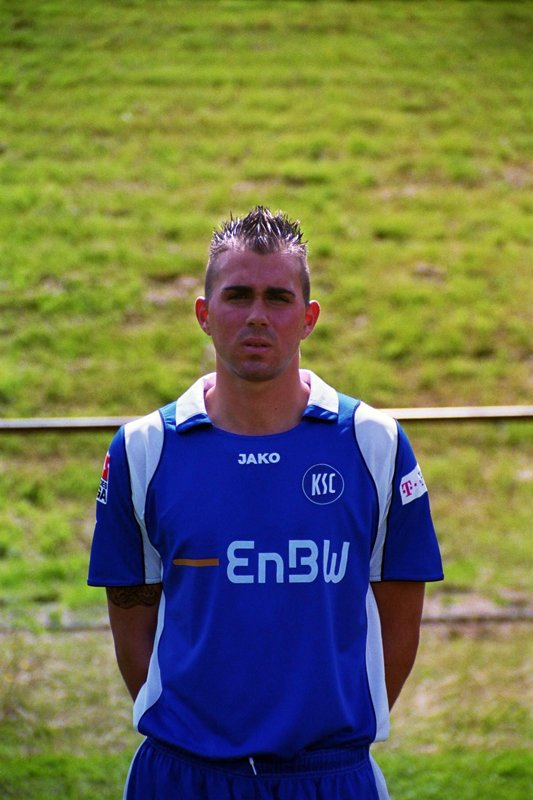
- Reinhard with Karlsruher SC

Personal information
- Date of birth: 19 May 1985 (age 41)
- Place of birth: Offenbach am Main, West Germany
- Height: 1.85 m (6 ft 1 in)
- Position: Defender

Youth career
- 1991–1995: Rot-Weiß Offenbach
- 1995–1997: Eintracht Frankfurt
- 1997–2000: Kickers Offenbach
- 2000–2004: Eintracht Frankfurt

Senior career*
Years	Team	Apps	(Gls)
2004–2007	Eintracht Frankfurt	33	(2)
2007–2008	Karlsruher SC	0	(0)
2007–2008	Karlsruher SC II	14	(0)
2008–2009	FC Ingolstadt 04	13	(0)
2009–2010	Eintracht Trier	9	(0)
2010–2012	SV Jügesheim	34	(5)
2012–2015	1. FC Magdeburg	44	(7)
2015	VfB Germania Halberstadt	9	(2)
2015–2016	Sportfreunde Seligenstadt	39	(6)
Total		195	(22)

International career
2003	Germany U-19	4	(0)
2003–2006	Germany U-20	9	(0)
- * Club domestic league appearances and goals

Christopher Reinhard (born 19 May 1985, in Offenbach am Main) is a German former professional footballer who played as a defender.

== Honours ==
Eintracht Frankfurt

- DFB-Pokal runners-up: 2005–06
