= Matthew Uy =

Filipino footballer

Personal information
- Full name: Matthew Christopher Celano Uy
- Date of birth: March 22, 1990 (age 36)
- Place of birth: New Hyde Park, New York, United States
- Height: 1.70 m (5 ft 7 in)
- Position: Midfielder

Youth career
- 2006–2007: IMG Soccer Academy
- 2007–2010: Fairfield Stags

Senior career*
| Years | Team | Apps | (Gls) |
| 2010 | Westchester Flames | 6 | (0) |
| 2011 | Long Island Rough Riders | 7 | (0) |
| 2012–2013 | Global FC | 3 | (1) |
| 2013 | Loyola | 4 | (0) |
| 2013 | Team Socceroo | | |

International career^{‡}
| 2006–2007 | United States U17 | 5 | (0) |
| 2012 | Philippines | 4 | (0) |
- * Club domestic league appearances and goals as of May 9, 2013 ‡ National team caps and goals as of October 12, 2012

Matthew Christopher Celano Uy (born March 22, 1990) is a footballer who last played for Filipino side Team Socceroo in the United Football League. Born in the United States, he has represented the Philippines national team.

== Early life ==
Uy was born in the United States to a Filipino father and an Italian mother. He represented NYC Italy in the 2012 Cosmos Copa and is a full international for the Philippines national team.

== Career ==
In the late days of March, he was waived by the Global of the United Football League in the transfer window. He was then immediately signed by the Loyola Meralco Sparks. He made his debut for the Sparks on April 9, 2013, coming in as a substitute for Jeong Byeong-Yeol in the 72nd minute against the Stallion Sta. Lucia.
