= Ben Starosta =

Polish footballer (born 1987)

Personal information
- Full name: Ben Mark Starosta
- Date of birth: 7 January 1987 (age 39)
- Place of birth: Sheffield, England
- Positions: Midfielder; right-back

Youth career
- Sheffield United

Senior career*
Years	Team	Apps	(Gls)
2005–2009	Sheffield United	0	(0)
2006	→ Tamworth (loan)	4	(0)
2007	→ Brentford (loan)	21	(0)
2008	→ Bradford City (loan)	15	(0)
2008	→ Aldershot Town (loan)	3	(0)
2008–2009	→ Lechia Gdańsk (loan)	8	(0)
2009	Darlington	0	(0)
2009–2010	Alfreton Town	1	(0)
2010	Dandenong Thunder	10	(0)
2011	Frickley Athletic	0	(0)
2011–2012	Miedź Legnica	22	(0)
2013–2014	Global	25	(5)
2014–2015	Nuneaton Town	12	(0)
2018–2020	Parkgate FC	36	(0)
2023–	Glapwell FC	2	(0)

International career
2007	Poland U20	5	(0)
- * Club domestic league appearances and goals as of 12:29, 5 July 2023 (UTC)

Ben Mark Starosta (born 7 January 1987) is a footballer who plays for Glapwell FC. Born in Sheffield, England, he started his career at his hometown club Sheffield United, although he never broke through into the first team. He was loaned to a number of clubs, both in England and Poland, while at United before eventually being released in 2009. After an aborted spell at Darlington he spent a period at Dandenong Thunder in Australia on non-contract terms before signing for Miedź Legnica in 2011. Starosta then spent a year at United Football League side Global in the Philippines. He has also played for the Poland national U-20 team, qualifying as he holds a Polish passport through his family.

== Club career ==
=== Sheffield United ===
Starosta started his club career with Sheffield United and had a spell in early 2006 on work experience with non-league Tamworth. He signed a new two-year contract with Sheffield United in May 2007, before joining Brentford in a five-month loan deal in August 2007 after impressing in two pre-season friendlies. Starosta played 23 games in all competitions for Brentford but was sent off during his last game for the club, a Boxing Day fixture against Wycombe Wanderers. In January 2008, he signed for Bradford City on loan for the rest of the 2007–08 season. Starosta made his debut for Bradford on 26 January 2008 as a half-time substitute in a 1–1 draw away at Wrexham. He took Darren Williams' place at right back the following game and played in a total of 15 games for Bradford, sharing first team duties with Williams.

Starosta returned to Sheffield United at the end of the season, but he moved back to League Two when he joined Aldershot Town on a one-month loan deal for the start of the 2008–09 season, with a view to a permanent transfer. He made his Aldershot debut in Town's game against Accrington Stanley at the start of the season, and played four games during his loan spell. With a permanent deal with Aldershot not materialising, Starosta instead joined Polish side Lechia Gdańsk on a six-month loan deal in September 2008. He returned to Sheffield United in February 2009 having played eleven times for Gdańsk but was released at the end of the season as the Blades cut back their squad.

=== Darlington, Alfreton Town, Dandenong Thunder and Frickley Athletic ===
In the summer of 2009, Starosta was unveiled as one of ten new signings made by Colin Todd at League Two side Darlington following their spell in administration. With the club still in financial difficulty however, he left by mutual consent before the season even started as Darlington tried to cut the wage bill. Starosta then spent a spell with Conference North side Alfreton Town, before, seeking a new club, he took up an offer from Australian Victorian Premier League side Dandenong Thunder, where he played on non-contract terms for a period, but soon left citing the poor quality of football on offer. Starosta returned to the UK and signed a short-term deal with Frickley Athletic of the Northern Premier League in March 2011, but failed to make an appearance for the club.

=== Miedź Legnica ===
In the summer of 2011 Starosta returned to Poland and signed a one-year deal for II liga side Miedź Legnica with the option of extending the deal for another two seasons. After a slow start he broke into the first team in August, appearing as a second-half substitute in a game against Bytovia Bytów. Establishing himself in the first team he played regularly through the season, making nineteen appearances as Miedź gained promotion to I liga. Miedź took up the option of extending his deal for him to remain with the club for the new season, however he subsequently left Legnica after the club cancelled his contract by mutual consent.

=== Global ===
In January 2013 Starosta signed for UFL side Global in the Philippines, making his league debut for Global at the start of February, scoring in a 2–0 victory over Pachanga Diliman. Starosta was released by Global the following March, having played 26 games and scored five goals and being made captain of the club.

=== Nuneaton Town ===
After leaving Global, Starosta rejoined his former Global manager Brian Reid, signing for Nuneaton Town in May 2014.

=== Parkgate ===
After a very short spell at Harworth Colliery F.C., Starosta became player-coach at the South Yorkshire, England based club. He signed in 2018 before leaving in 2019 for personal reasons, however, he featured in a Northern Counties East Football League match day squad in early 2020.

== Managerial career ==
Starosta was the player-coach between 2018 and 2020 for Northern Counties East Football League side Parkgate.

== International career ==
Starosta qualified to play for Poland through his grandfather who moved to England from Poland after the Second World War. He received his Polish passport in early 2007 and was called up to the Poland squad for the 2007 FIFA U-20 World Cup. He started all four games, including the 1–0 defeat of Brazil on 30 June.

== Personal life ==
Having been born to a Polish family but brought up in England, Starosta speaks English but has learned Polish during his time in the country. As a young player his heroes were David Beckham and Kaká. Starosta cites his main hobby as playing golf and also enjoys singing to the point that his Miedź teammates suggested he enter the Polish version of Must Be The Music.

== Honours ==
Miedź Legnica

- II liga West: 2012–13

Global

- UFL Division 1: Runner-up 2013
