= Arie van Lent =

Dutch footballer and manager

Personal information
- Date of birth: 31 August 1970 (age 56)
- Place of birth: Opheusden, Netherlands
- Height: 1.90 m (6 ft 3 in)
- Position: Striker

Youth career
- 1984–1989: Sparta 57 Opheusden

Senior career*
Years	Team	Apps	(Gls)
1989–1998	Werder Bremen (A)	162	(101)
1990–1998	Werder Bremen	32	(6)
1992–1993	→ VfB Oldenburg (loan)	1	(0)
1998–1999	Greuther Fürth	34	(16)
1999–2004	Borussia Mönchengladbach	145	(54)
2004–2006	Eintracht Frankfurt	43	(16)
2006	Rot-Weiss Essen	19	(6)
Total		436	(199)

Managerial career
- 2007–2009: 1. FC Kleve
- 2010–2011: Rot Weiss Ahlen
- 2011–2013: Kickers Offenbach
- 2015–2020: Borussia Mönchengladbach II
- 2020–2021: SpVgg Unterhaching
- * Club domestic league appearances and goals

Arie van Lent (born 31 August 1970) is a Dutch former professional footballer, who played as a forward. He was most recently the manager of SpVgg Unterhaching.

== Playing career ==
At the age of 12, van Lent played for the youth team of Sparta 57 Opheusden. In his youth, he dreamed of being with Ajax Amsterdam or PSV Eindhoven.

He spent much professional career as a journeyman in Germany, mostly on the bench of Werder Bremen or featuring for second-division sides and below. In 1997, he famously scored four goals in Werder Bremen's 3–2 home win in the Bundesliga against 1. FC Köln, one of which was an own goal.

Later, he became a regular in the Bundesliga with Borussia Mönchengladbach. In 2004, van Lent joined the then-second division side Eintracht Frankfurt and became their vice captain and leading scorer (16 goals) in their promotion campaign. During the 2005–06 season, van Lent lost his starting place to Ioannis Amanatidis.

He last played for Rot-Weiss Essen, where he had a contract until 30 June 2008. However, the contract was cancelled in December 2006.

== Coaching career ==
In summer 2007, he was named as the new head coach of 1. FC Kleve and worked here until March 2009. From July 2010 to June 2011 he was the head coach of Rot Weiss Ahlen. On 10 May 2011, it was confirmed he will be the new head coach of Kickers Offenbach in the 2011–12 season. On 1 October 2013, van Lent became a coach of the A-youth (U-19) of Borussia Mönchengladbach.

On 18 August 2020, he was appointed as the head coach of SpVgg Unterhaching. Following the 2020–21 season that resulted in a relegation for the club, he left Unterhaching by mutual consent.

== Personal life ==
Arie van Lent has Dutch and the German citizenship. He is married, is a father of a daughter and lived in Korschenbroich, North Rhine-Westphalia, Germany.
