= Christian Lenze =

German footballer

Personal information
- Date of birth: 26 April 1977 (age 49)
- Place of birth: Magdeburg, East Germany
- Height: 1.82 m (6 ft 0 in)
- Position: Midfielder

Youth career
- 1. FC Magdeburg

Senior career*
Years	Team	Apps	(Gls)
1997–1999	1. FC Magdeburg	61	(7)
1999–2001	Kickers Emden		
2001–2003	Werder Bremen II	72	(20)
2004	VfL Osnabrück	16	(6)
2004–2006	Eintracht Frankfurt	16	(2)
2006–2007	Erzgebirge Aue	25	(3)
2007–2009	Eintracht Braunschweig	51	(5)
2009–2010	VfB Oldenburg	15	(2)
Total		256	(45)
- * Club domestic league appearances and goals

Christian Lenze (born 26 April 1977 in Magdeburg, Germany) is a German former professional footballer who played as midfielder.
