= 2004–05 DFB-Pokal =

Tournament details
- Country: Germany
- Teams: 64

Final positions
- Champions: Bayern Munich
- Runners-up: Schalke 04

Tournament statistics
- Matches played: 63

The 2004–05 DFB-Pokal was the 62nd season of the annual German football cup competition. 64 teams competed in the tournament of six rounds which began on 20 August 2004 and ended on 28 May 2005. In the final FC Bayern Munich defeated FC Schalke 04 2–1, thereby claiming their twelfth title and completing the double.

== Matches ==
Times up to 30 October 2004 and from 27 March 2005 are CEST (UTC+2). Times from 31 October 2004 to 26 March 2005 are CET (UTC+1).

=== First round ===
20 August 2004
SV Werder Bremen II	1–2	MSV Duisburg
FC Teningen	1–2	1. FC Nürnberg
FC St. Pauli	1–3	FC Energie Cottbus
Kickers Offenbach	1–2	LR Ahlen
Jahn Regensburg II	1–3	SpVgg Unterhaching
Eintracht Braunschweig	1–0	Wacker Burghausen	(AET)
21 August 2004
1. FC Saarbrücken	1–4	1. FC Köln
Fortuna Düsseldorf	1–3	VfL Bochum
VfB Lübeck	0–1	Borussia Dortmund
VfL Osnabrück	3–2	Erzgebirge Aue
FC Rot-Weiß Erfurt	0–1	Eintracht Frankfurt
1. FC Union Berlin	0–4	SC Freiburg
SC Paderborn 07	4–2	Hamburger SV
Jahn Regensburg	0–2	SV Werder Bremen
FC Schönberg 95	0–15	1. FC Kaiserslautern
Hannover 96 II	0–3	Rot-Weiß Oberhausen
TSV Völpke	0–6	FC Bayern Munich
1. FSV Mainz 05 II	1–3	Bayer 04 Leverkusen
TuS Mayen	0–6	VfB Stuttgart
FC Carl Zeiss Jena	1–2	SpVgg Greuther Fürth	(AET)
Hertha BSC II	0–2	FC Schalke 04
TSG 1899 Hoffenheim	1–2	Hansa Rostock
22 August 2004
Rot-Weiss Essen	0–2	Alemannia Aachen
Dynamo Dresden	1–2	Karlsruher SC
FC Bayern Munich II	1–1	Borussia Mönchengladbach	(AET) (FC Bayern Munich II won 6–5 on penalties)
SG Wattenscheid 09	1–3	Eintracht Trier
VfR Aalen	2–5	1. FSV Mainz 05
TSV 1946 Aindling	0–1	Hertha BSC
VfR Neumünster	0–3	Hannover 96
1. FC Köln II	2–0 ^{*}	VfL Wolfsburg
Germania Schöneiche	1–2	TSV 1860 München
VFC Plauen	1–2	Arminia Bielefeld

^{*} Match awarded 2–0 to 1. FC Köln II as VfL Wolfsburg fielded an ineligible player

=== Second round ===
21 September 2004
SC Paderborn 07	2–1	MSV Duisburg
SC Freiburg	3–2	VfL Bochum	(AET)
Karlsruher SC	1–1	1. FSV Mainz 05	(AET) (Karlsruher SC won 3–0 on penalties)
1. FC Nürnberg	2–3	LR Ahlen	(AET)
TSV 1860 Munich	0–0	Eintracht Trier	(AET) (Eintracht Trier won 4–3 on penalties)
1. FC Köln II	2–4	Arminia Bielefeld
VfL Osnabrück	2–3	FC Bayern Munich
22 September 2004
Eintracht Frankfurt	4–2	SpVgg Greuther Fürth	(AET)
FC Energie Cottbus	2–2	Hannover 96	(AET) (Hannover 96 won 5–4 on penalties)
Rot-Weiß Oberhausen	0–2	VfB Stuttgart
Eintracht Braunschweig	3–2	Hertha BSC
1. FC Kaiserslautern	4–4	FC Schalke 04	(AET) (FC Schalke 04 won 4–3 on penalties)
FC Bayern Munich II	2–1	Alemannia Aachen
1. FC Köln	3–3	Hansa Rostock	(AET) (Hansa Rostock won 4–2 on penalties)
Borussia Dortmund	3–1	SpVgg Unterhaching
SV Werder Bremen	3–2	Bayer 04 Leverkusen

=== Round of 16 ===
9 November 2004
SV Werder Bremen	3–1	Eintracht Trier	(AET)
FC Bayern Munich II	3–2	Eintracht Braunschweig
Arminia Bielefeld	4–0	Karlsruher SC
Hannover 96	1–0	Borussia Dortmund
10 November 2004
SC Paderborn 07	2–2	SC Freiburg	(AET) (SC Freiburg won 4–1 on penalties)
LR Ahlen	2–3	Hansa Rostock	(AET)
Eintracht Frankfurt	0–2	FC Schalke 04
FC Bayern Munich	3–0	VfB Stuttgart

=== Quarter-finals ===
1 March 2005
Arminia Bielefeld	1–0	Hansa Rostock
FC Schalke 04	3–1	Hannover 96
FC Bayern Munich II	0–3	SV Werder Bremen
2 March 2005
SC Freiburg	0–7	FC Bayern Munich

=== Semi-finals ===
19 April 2005
FC Schalke 04	2–2	SV Werder Bremen	(AET) (FC Schalke 04 won 5–4 on penalties)
20 April 2005
Arminia Bielefeld	0–2	FC Bayern Munich

=== Final ===
28 May 2005
20:45 CEST

Schalke 04	1–2	Bayern Munich
Lincoln 45' (pen.)	Report	Makaay 42'; Salihamidžić 76'

Olympiastadion, Berlin
Attendance: 74,349
Referee: Florian Meyer (Burgdorf)

== Top scorers ==
The following were the top scorers of the 2004–05 DFB-Pokal.

Rank	Player	Club	Goals
1	(Germany) Carsten Jancker	1. FC Kaiserslautern	6
1	(Peru) Claudio Pizarro	Bayern Munich	6
3	(Netherlands) Roy Makaay	Bayern Munich	5
3	(Germany) Lukas Podolski	1. FC Köln	5
5	(Italy) Antonio Di Salvo	Hansa Rostock	4
5	(Peru) Paolo Guerrero	Bayern Munich	4
5	(Germany) Mike Hanke	Schalke 04	4
5	(Paraguay) Roque Santa Cruz	Bayern Munich	4
5	(Germany) Selim Teber	1. FC Kaiserslautern	4
