= Abdelaziz Ahanfouf =

German-Moroccan footballer

Personal information
- Date of birth: 14 January 1978 (age 48)
- Place of birth: Flörsheim, West Germany
- Height: 1.84 m (6 ft 0 in)
- Position: Striker

Youth career
- Eintracht Rüsselsheim
- VfB Ginsheim
- Kickers Offenbach

Senior career*
Years	Team	Apps	(Gls)
1997–1999	SpVgg Unterhaching	45	(11)
1999–2000	Hansa Rostock	17	(0)
2001	SpVgg Unterhaching	17	(1)
2002	Mainz 05	4	(0)
2002–2003	Dynamo Dresden	14	(5)
2003–2006	MSV Duisburg	89	(40)
2006–2007	Arminia Bielefeld	6	(2)
2008–2009	Wehen Wiesbaden	4	(0)
2010	Chabab Rif Al Hoceima	0	(0)
2011	Darmstadt 98	7	(2)
Total		203	(61)

International career
2004–2006	Morocco	6	(0)
- * Club domestic league appearances and goals

Abdelaziz „Aziz“ Ahanfouf (born 14 January 1978) is a German-Moroccan former professional footballer who played as a striker.

== Career ==
Ahanfouf was born in Germany and has played professionally for several German clubs. He joined Arminia Bielefeld from MSV Duisburg at the start of the 2006–07 season. He played for Bielefeld until December 2007, when he suffered a serious injury as a result of a car accident.

Ahanfouf signed a three-and-a-half-year contract with Wehen in January 2008.
