= Nico Patschinski =

German footballer (born 1976)

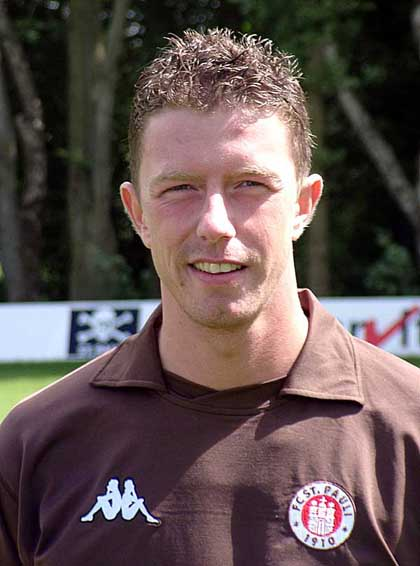
- Patschinski with FC St. Pauli in 2002

Personal information
- Date of birth: 8 November 1976 (age 49)
- Place of birth: East Berlin, East Germany
- Height: 1.86 m (6 ft 1 in)
- Position: Forward

Youth career
- 1984–1988: BFC Dynamo
- 1988–1994: Union Berlin

Senior career*
Years	Team	Apps	(Gls)
1994–1997	Union Berlin	57	(16)
1998	SV Babelsberg 03	14	(3)
1998–1999	Dynamo Dresden	32	(12)
1999–2000	Greuther Fürth	10	(0)
2000–2003	FC St. Pauli	75	(21)
2003–2005	Eintracht Trier	65	(23)
2005–2006	LR Ahlen	31	(8)
2006–2009	Union Berlin	82	(27)
2009–2010	BFC Dynamo	29	(14)
2010–2011	Eintracht Trier	15	(2)
2011–2012	Borussia Neunkirchen	36	(18)
2012	Victoria Hamburg	15	(13)
2012–2013	BFC Dynamo	18	(6)
2013–2014	Niendorfer TSV		
- * Club domestic league appearances and goals

Nico Patschinski (born 8 November 1976) is a German former professional footballer who played as a forward

== Career ==
=== 1980–1994: Youth and rise with Union ===
Patschinski was born in Berlin. He began to play ice hockey in SC Dynamo Berlin's youth department. He was inspired by his father who himself had been a successful ice hockey player. Two years later, Patschinski switched sports and took up football, joining BFC Dynamo. In 1988, Patschinski was transferred to 1. FC Union Berlin.

=== 1994–2000: Rambler ===
Patschinski made his debut in the senior team in 1994 and established himself as a regular in the following season. But in 1997, Union were hit hard by financial troubles and Patschinski took up the offer of Potsdam-based SV Babelsberg 03.

Patschinski did not have a good time in Potsdam, even though he played regularly. The fans had an inherent distrust of Berlin-born players and were quick to criticize them. In the summer of 1998, Patschinski left the club and signed a contract with Dynamo Dresden. In a match with his new club in Babelsberg, Patschinski scored for Dresden and subsequently showed the fans of Balsberg the bird.

Patschinski spent one year in Dresden, scoring 11 goals in 31 matches He then moved to SpVgg Greuther Fürth to finally play in a fully professional league. He gained some experience in the 2. Bundesliga with Fürth, but did neither score a goal nor become a regular starter. Therefore, he sought a move away from Fürth after only one season. Additionally, Berlin-born Patschinski did not feel at home in rural Fürth.

=== 2000–2003: Success with St. Pauli ===
Patschinski's new club was FC St. Pauli where he would have his biggest success in the next three years. With Hamburg-based St. Pauli, Patschinski gained promotion to the Bundesliga and scored the second goal in St. Pauli's 2–1 victory over Intercontinental Cup holders FC Bayern Munich. FC St. Pauli created a T-shirt to commemorate the event, naming the club "Weltpokalsieger-Besieger" (German for Intercontintal Cup winner beaters).

However, St. Pauli's stay in the top flight was short when the team was relegated at the end of the 2001–02 season St. Pauli were also relegated from the 2. Bundesliga in the following season and Patschinski found himself on the bench after the winter break, as new manager Franz Gerber did not value him.

=== 2003–2006: Relegation and the national team ===
Following the relegation, Patschinski signed for SV Eintracht Trier 05 in the 2. Bundesliga. But relegation hit Patschinski's club again, and after two years he moved on to another 2. Bundesliga club, LR Ahlen. The club were relegated at the end of the season, and Patschinski had managed a rather curious feat: in five seasons his clubs had been relegated four times. Patschinski would describe his move to Ahlen as a mistake he "would never make again".

During his spell at Ahlen the football magazine RUND discovered that Patschinski's grandparents were Polish and he would be eligible to play for the Poland national team. However, the interest cooled off as the Polish manager had already selected his team of the 2006 FIFA World Cup. Even though the PZPN president had signaled interest for matches after the World Cup, Patschinski did not hear anything from them again.

=== 2006 bis 2009: Return to Berlin ===
At the start of the 2006–07 season, Patschinski returned to the club of his youth, Union Berlin. His team had a mixed season, alternating between promotion hope and relegation fight. In the end, Union Berlin saved themselves from relegation and Patschinski scored a Goal of the Week against his former club FC St. Pauli. Patschinski admitted that he had meant to cross the ball. In the following season Patschinski and Union Berlin qualified for the newly created 3. Liga.

Citing a lack of trust, Union dissolved the player's contract on 4 March 2009.

=== Return to BFC ===
On 28 July 2009, Patschinski joined BFC Dynamo.

== Personal life ==
Patschinski has three children. He and Mariana Kautz were married in December 2006. Their relationship ended in winter 2009.

By the end of his footballing career, Patschinski had lost most of the money he had earned. In July 2015, he began working as a funeral director in the Hamburg area. Having also worked as a parcel carrier and a dishwasher, he later became a bus driver.
