= 2005–06 Bundesliga =

43rd season of the Bundesliga

Bundesliga
- Season: 2005–06
- Dates: 5 August 2005 – 13 May 2006
- Champions: Bayern Munich; 19th Bundesliga title 20th German title
- Relegated: 1. FC Kaiserslautern; MSV Duisburg; 1. FC Köln
- Champions League: Bayern Munich; Werder Bremen; Hamburger SV
- UEFA Cup: Schalke 04; Bayer Leverkusen; Eintracht Frankfurt
- Intertoto Cup: Hertha BSC
- Matches: 306
- Goals: 861 (2.81 per match)
- Top goalscorer: Miroslav Klose (25)

The 2005–06 Bundesliga was the 43rd season of the Bundesliga, Germany's premier football league. It began on 5 August 2005 and concluded on 13 May 2006.

== Teams ==
Eighteen teams competed in the league – the top fifteen teams from the previous season and the three teams promoted from the 2. Bundesliga. The promoted teams were 1. FC Köln, MSV Duisburg and Eintracht Frankfurt. 1. FC Köln and Eintracht Frankfurt returned to the top flight after an absence of one year while MSV Duisburg returned in the top flight after an absence of six years. They replaced VfL Bochum, Hansa Rostock and SC Freiburg, ending their top flight spells of three, ten and two years respectively.

== Team overview ==
Location of teams in Bundesliga 2005–06

=== Stadia and locations ===
Club	Location	Ground	Capacity
Arminia Bielefeld	Bielefeld	SchücoArena	26,600
Bayer 04 Leverkusen	Leverkusen	BayArena	22,500
FC Bayern Munich	Munich	Allianz Arena	75,000
Borussia Dortmund	Dortmund	Westfalenstadion	68,600
Borussia Mönchengladbach	Mönchengladbach	Stadion im Borussia-Park	54,067
MSV Duisburg*	Duisburg	MSV-Arena	31,502
Eintracht Frankfurt*	Frankfurt am Main	Commerzbank Arena	62,000
Hamburger SV	Hamburg	AOL Arena	62,000
Hannover 96	Hanover	AWD-Arena	60,400
Hertha BSC	Berlin	Olympiastadion	76,000
1. FC Kaiserslautern	Kaiserslautern	Fritz Walter Stadion	41,500
1. FC Köln*	Cologne	Müngersdorfer Stadion	46,000
1. FSV Mainz 05	Mainz	Stadion am Bruchweg	20,300
1. FC Nürnberg	Nuremberg	Frankenstadion	44,700
FC Schalke 04	Gelsenkirchen	Arena AufSchalke	61,973
VfB Stuttgart	Stuttgart	Gottlieb-Daimler-Stadion	53,700
SV Werder Bremen	Bremen	Weserstadion	42,100
VfL Wolfsburg	Wolfsburg	Volkswagen Arena	30,000

(*) Promoted from 2. Bundesliga.

=== Personnel and kits ===
Team	Manager	Kit manufacturer	Shirt sponsor
Arminia Bielefeld	(Germany) Thomas von Heesen	Saller	Krombacher
Bayer 04 Leverkusen	(Germany) Michael Skibbe	Adidas	RWE
FC Bayern Munich	(Germany) Felix Magath	Adidas	Deutsche Telekom
Borussia Dortmund	(Netherlands) Bert van Marwijk	Nike	E.ON
Borussia Mönchengladbach	(Germany) Horst Köppel	Lotto	Kyocera
MSV Duisburg*	(Germany) Heiko Scholz (caretaker)	Uhlsport	Iceline Tiefkühl
Eintracht Frankfurt*	(Germany) Friedhelm Funkel	Jako	Fraport
Hamburger SV	(Germany) Thomas Doll	Puma	Abu Dhabi Investment Group
Hannover 96	(Germany) Peter Neururer	Diadora	TUI Group
Hertha BSC	(Germany) Falko Götz	Nike	Arcor
1. FC Kaiserslautern	(Germany) Wolfgang Wolf	Kappa	Deutsche Vermögensberatung
1. FC Köln*	(Switzerland) Hanspeter Latour	Adidas	Gerling-Konzern
1. FSV Mainz 05	(Germany) Jürgen Klopp	Lotto	DBV-Winterthur
1. FC Nürnberg	(Germany) Hans Meyer	Adidas	mister*lady Jeans
FC Schalke 04	(Germany) Mirko Slomka	Adidas	Victoria Versicherung
VfB Stuttgart	(Germany) Armin Veh	Puma	EnBW
SV Werder Bremen	(Germany) Thomas Schaaf	Kappa	KiK
VfL Wolfsburg	(Germany) Klaus Augenthaler	Nike	Volkswagen/Volkswagen TSI

== League table ==
Pos	Team	Pld	W	D	L	GF	GA	GD	Pts	Qualification or relegation
1	Bayern Munich (C)	34	22	9	3	67	32	+35	75	Qualification to Champions League group stage
2	Werder Bremen	34	21	7	6	79	37	+42	70	Qualification to Champions League group stage
3	Hamburger SV	34	21	5	8	53	30	+23	68	Qualification to Champions League third qualifying round
4	Schalke 04	34	16	13	5	47	31	+16	61	Qualification to UEFA Cup first round
5	Bayer Leverkusen	34	14	10	10	64	49	+15	52	Qualification to UEFA Cup first round
6	Hertha BSC	34	12	12	10	52	48	+4	48	Qualification to Intertoto Cup third round
7	Borussia Dortmund	34	11	13	10	45	42	+3	46	
8	1. FC Nürnberg	34	12	8	14	49	51	−2	44	
9	VfB Stuttgart	34	9	16	9	37	39	−2	43	
10	Borussia Mönchengladbach	34	10	12	12	42	50	−8	42	
11	Mainz 05	34	9	11	14	46	47	−1	38	
12	Hannover 96	34	7	17	10	43	47	−4	38	
13	Arminia Bielefeld	34	10	7	17	32	47	−15	37	
14	Eintracht Frankfurt	34	9	9	16	42	51	−9	36	Qualification to UEFA Cup first round (Note: As DFB Cup 2005-06 winners Bayern Munich qualified for the 2006–07 UEFA Champions League, the 2006–07 UEFA Cup place for domestic cup winners was awarded to finalists Eintracht Frankfurt.)
15	VfL Wolfsburg	34	7	13	14	33	55	−22	34	
16	1. FC Kaiserslautern (R)	34	8	9	17	47	71	−24	33	Relegation to 2. Bundesliga
17	1. FC Köln (R)	34	7	9	18	49	71	−22	30	Relegation to 2. Bundesliga
18	MSV Duisburg (R)	34	5	12	17	34	63	−29	27	Relegation to 2. Bundesliga

Source: kicker.de
Rules for classification: 1) points; 2) goal difference; 3) number of goals scored.
(C) Champions; (R) Relegated

== Results ==
Home \ Away	BSC	DSC	SVW	BVB	DUI	SGE	HSV	H96	FCK	KOE	B04	M05	BMG	FCB	FCN	S04	VFB	WOB
Hertha BSC	—	1–0	1–2	0–0	3–2	2–0	4–2	1–1	3–0	2–4	1–5	3–1	2–2	0–0	1–1	1–2	2–0	3–0
Arminia Bielefeld	3–0	—	0–1	1–0	0–2	1–0	0–2	4–1	0–0	3–2	1–0	2–0	0–2	1–2	0–0	0–1	2–1	0–1
Werder Bremen	0–3	5–2	—	3–2	2–0	4–1	1–1	5–0	0–2	6–0	2–1	4–2	2–0	3–0	6–2	0–0	1–1	6–1
Borussia Dortmund	2–0	2–0	0–1	—	2–0	1–1	1–1	0–2	2–1	2–1	1–2	1–1	2–1	1–2	2–1	1–2	0–0	3–2
MSV Duisburg	2–1	1–1	3–5	1–1	—	0–1	0–2	0–0	2–2	1–1	1–3	0–0	1–1	1–3	1–0	1–1	1–1	1–0
Eintracht Frankfurt	1–1	3–0	0–1	2–0	5–2	—	1–2	0–1	2–2	6–3	1–4	0–0	0–2	0–1	1–0	0–1	1–1	1–1
Hamburger SV	2–1	2–1	1–2	2–4	2–0	1–1	—	1–1	3–0	3–1	0–2	1–0	2–0	2–0	3–0	1–0	0–2	0–1
Hannover 96	2–2	0–1	0–0	1–2	1–1	2–0	2–1	—	5–1	1–0	2–2	2–2	1–1	1–1	1–1	1–2	3–3	2–4
1. FC Kaiserslautern	0–2	2–0	1–5	3–3	5–3	1–2	0–3	1–0	—	2–2	2–2	0–2	3–0	1–1	1–3	0–2	1–1	3–2
1. FC Köln	0–1	4–2	1–4	0–0	3–1	1–1	0–1	1–4	2–3	—	0–3	1–0	2–1	1–2	3–4	2–2	0–0	3–0
Bayer Leverkusen	1–2	1–1	1–1	2–1	3–2	2–1	0–1	0–0	5–1	2–1	—	1–2	2–1	2–5	2–2	1–1	1–1	4–0
Mainz 05	2–2	1–1	0–2	1–1	1–1	2–2	1–3	0–0	0–2	4–2	3–1	—	3–0	2–2	4–1	1–0	1–2	5–1
Borussia Mönchengladbach	2–2	2–0	2–1	2–1	2–1	4–3	0–0	2–2	4–1	2–0	1–1	1–0	—	1–3	0–1	0–0	1–1	1–1
Bayern Munich	3–0	2–0	3–1	3–3	4–0	5–2	1–2	1–0	2–1	2–2	1–0	2–1	3–0	—	2–1	3–0	3–1	2–0
1. FC Nürnberg	2–1	2–3	3–1	1–2	3–0	0–1	2–1	1–1	3–2	2–1	1–1	3–0	5–2	1–2	—	1–1	0–1	1–0
Schalke 04	0–0	3–1	2–1	0–0	3–0	2–0	0–2	2–0	2–1	1–1	7–4	1–0	1–1	1–1	2–0	—	3–2	2–2
VfB Stuttgart	3–3	1–1	0–0	0–0	0–1	0–2	1–2	2–2	1–0	2–3	0–2	2–1	1–1	0–0	1–0	2–0	—	2–1
VfL Wolfsburg	1–1	0–0	1–1	2–2	1–1	1–0	0–1	2–1	2–2	1–1	2–1	0–3	2–0	0–0	1–1	0–0	0–1	—

Source: DFB
Legend: Blue = home team win; Yellow = draw; Red = away team win.

== Overall ==
- Most wins – Bayern Munich (22)
- Fewest wins – MSV Duisburg (5)
- Most draws – Hannover 96 (17)
- Fewest draws – Hamburger SV (5)
- Most losses – 1. FC Köln (18)
- Fewest losses – Bayern Munich (3)
- Most goals scored – Werder Bremen (79)
- Fewest goals scored – Arminia Bielefeld (32)
- Most goals conceded – 1. FC Kaiserslautern and 1. FC Köln (71)
- Fewest goals conceded – Hamburger SV (30)

== Top scorers ==
Rank	Player	Club	Goals
1	(Germany) (Poland) Miroslav Klose	Werder Bremen	25
2	(Bulgaria) Dimitar Berbatov	Bayer Leverkusen	21
3	(Turkey) Halil Altıntop	1. FC Kaiserslautern	20
4	(Netherlands) Roy Makaay	Bayern Munich	17
5	(Slovakia) Róbert Vittek	1. FC Nürnberg	16
6	(Croatia) Ivan Klasnić	Werder Bremen	15
7	(Germany) Michael Ballack	Bayern Munich	14
8	(Poland) (Netherlands) Ebi Smolarek	Borussia Dortmund	13
9	(Brazil) Marcelinho	Hertha BSC	12
9	(Germany) (Poland) Lukas Podolski	1. FC Köln	12
9	(Germany) Michael Thurk	1. FSV Mainz 05	12
9	(Greece) Ioannis Amanatidis	Eintracht Frankfurt	12
9	(Argentina) (Spain) Diego Klimowicz	VfL Wolfsburg	12

== Awards ==
=== Team of the Season ===
Team of the Season
Goalkeeper	(Germany) Georg Koch (MSV Duisburg)			
Defenders	(Brazil) Lúcio (Bayern Munich)	(Brazil) Marcelo Bordon (Schalke 04)	(Switzerland) Mario Cantaluppi (1. FC Nürnberg)	
Midfielders	(Germany) Michael Ballack (Bayern Munich)	(Germany) Torsten Frings (Werder Bremen)	(Germany) Tim Borowski (Werder Bremen)	(France) Johan Micoud (Werder Bremen)
Forwards	(Germany) Miroslav Klose (Werder Bremen)	(Croatia) Ivan Klasnić (Werder Bremen)	(Turkey) Halil Altıntop (1. FC Kaiserslautern)	

== Attendances ==
No.	Team	Average	Change	Highest
1	Borussia Dortmund	72,808	-5,7%	81,264
2	Bayern München	67,588	26,8%	69,000
3	Schalke 04	61,244	-0,2%	61,542
4	Hamburger SV	52,630	7,6%	57,000
5	1. FC Köln	48,942	27,2%	50,400
6	Borussia Mönchengladbach	47,732	-2,9%	54,019
7	Hertha BSC	46,732	-3,6%	74,218
8	Eintracht Frankfurt	41,863	71,5%	50,000
9	Werder Bremen	39,540	-0,8%	42,100
10	VfB Stuttgart	39,118	-5,3%	56,000
11	Hannover 96	38,419	6,1%	49,000
12	1. FC Kaiserslautern	33,044	-7,3%	50,754
13	1. FC Nürnberg	32,606	8,2%	47,250
14	MSV Duisburg	25,183	49,7%	31,502
15	Bayer Leverkusen	22,353	-0,7%	22,500
16	VfL Wolfsburg	22,083	-8,5%	30,000
17	Arminia Bielefeld	21,951	-2,8%	26,601
18	Mainz 05	20,182	0,1%	20,300
