= 2002–03 SV Werder Bremen season =

Werder Bremen
2002–03 season
- Manager: Thomas Schaaf
- Bundesliga: 6th
- DFB-Pokal: Semi-final
- UEFA Cup: Second round
- Top goalscorer: Ailton (16)
Home colours	Away colours

SV Werder Bremen retained its 6th place in Bundesliga with a solid season, in spite of key players Frank Rost and Torsten Frings leaving prior to the season. Coach Thomas Schaaf bought Johan Micoud as replacement for Frings, with the French ex-Parma player making an instant impact in Germany, while Ailton once again hit 16 goals, finishing third in the goal scoring charts.

== Players ==
=== First-team squad ===
Squad at end of season

No.	Pos.	Nation	Player
1	GK	POL	Jakub Wierzchowski
4	DF	GER	Fabian Ernst
6	MF	GER	Frank Baumann
7	DF	CAN	Paul Stalteri
8	MF	HUN	Krisztián Lisztes
9	FW	GRE	Angelos Charisteas
10	MF	FRA	Johan Micoud
11	MF	CRO	Ivica Banović
14	DF	NED	Frank Verlaat
16	GK	GER	Pascal Borel
17	FW	CRO	Ivan Klasnić (Note: Klasnić was born in Hamburg, West Germany (now Germany), but also qualified to represent Croatia internationally and represented Croatia at U-19 and U-21 level before making his international debut for Croatia in February 2004.)
18	FW	GER	Markus Daun
19	DF	UKR	Viktor Skrypnyk
20	DF	SCG	Mladen Krstajić (Note: Krstajić was born in Zenica, SFR Yugoslavia (now Bosnia and Herzegovina), but was raised in Serbia and Montenegro (now Serbia) and made his international debut for Serbia and Montenegro in 1999.)
22	MF	GER	Marco Reich

No.	Pos.	Nation	Player
23	DF	SUI	Ludovic Magnin
24	MF	GER	Tim Borowski
27	DF	GER	Christian Schulz
28	MF	NAM	Razundara Tjikuzu
30	GK	GER	Michael Jürgen
31	GK	GER	Alexander Walke
32	FW	BRA	Ailton
33	DF	GER	Mike Barten
34	DF	GER	Manuel Friedrich
35	MF	GER	Marco Stier
36	MF	GER	Stefan Beckert
37	MF	GER	Christian Lenze
38	FW	PAR	Nelson Valdez
39	DF	GER	Björn Schierenbeck

=== Left club during season ===
Note: Flags indicate national team as defined under FIFA eligibility rules; some limited exceptions apply. Players may hold more than one non-FIFA nationality.

No.	Pos.	Nation	Player
3	DF	GER	Stefan Blank (to St. Pauli)
21	MF	GER	Holger Wehlage (on loan to Union Berlin)
25	DF	USA	Philip Salyer (to Dallas Burn)

No.	Pos.	Nation	Player
26	MF	GER	Simon Rolfes (on loan to SSV Reutlingen 05)
29	FW	CMR	Blaise Mamoum (to Waldhof Mannheim)

=== Reserve team ===
Werder Bremen's reserve team were managed by Thomas Wolter and finished 6th in the Regionalliga Nord.

Note: Flags indicate national team as defined under FIFA eligibility rules; some limited exceptions apply. Players may hold more than one non-FIFA nationality.

No.	Pos.	Nation	Player
—	GK	GER	Carsten Albers
—	GK	GER	Michael Jürgen
—	GK	GER	Alexander Walke
—	DF	GER	Mike Barten
—	DF	GER	Danny Fütterer
—	DF	GER	Florian Heidenreich
—	DF	BIH	Damir Memišević
—	DF	GER	Mario Neunaber
—	DF	GER	Björn Schierenbeck
—	DF	GER	Christian Schulz
—	DF	USA	Philip Salyer
—	DF	GER	Hannes Wilking
—	MF	GER	Stefan Beckert
—	MF	CAN	Maycoll Cañizalez (Note: Cañizalez was born in Quezaltepeque, El Salvador, but was raised in Canada and represented Canada at U-17, U-20, and U-23 level before making his international debut for Canada in January 2003.)

No.	Pos.	Nation	Player
—	MF	GER	Sebastian Ferrulli
—	MF	GER	Marius Flatken
—	MF	GER	Peer Jaekel
—	MF	GER	Christian Lenze
—	MF	GER	André Möller
—	MF	HUN	Krisztian Nanasi
—	MF	GER	Simon Rolfes
—	MF	GER	Marco Stier
—	MF	GER	Julian Stroppel
—	MF	NAM	Razundara Tjikuzu
—	FW	GER	Ahmet Kuru
—	FW	CMR	Blaise Mamoum
—	FW	GER	Daniel Niemann
—	FW	PAR	Nelson Valdez

== Results ==
=== Bundesliga ===
- Arminia Bielefeld-Werder Bremen 3–0
- 1–0 Bastian Reinhardt 16'
- 2–0 Massimilian Porcello 90'
- 3–0 Artur Wichniarek 90'
- Werder Bremen-Hamburg 2–1
- 1–0 Angelos Charisteas 9'
- 1–1 Tomáš Ujfaluši 20'
- 2–1 Holger Wehlage 50'
- 1860 Munich-Werder Bremen 3–0
- 1–0 Markus Schroth 32'
- 2–0 Harald Cerny 62'
- 3–0 Martin Max 78'
- Werder Bremen-Nürnberg 4–1
- 1–0 Ailton 30' (pen.)
- 1–1 Saša Ćirić 54'
- 2–1 Johan Micoud 59'
- 3–1 Ailton 66'
- 4–1 Ailton 79'
- Energie Cottbus-Werder Bremen 0–1
- 0–1 Tomislav Piplica 51' (o.g.)
- Werder Bremen-Bayer Leverkusen 3–2
- 0–1 Thomas Brdarić 11'
- 1–1 Ailton 25' (pen.)
- 2–1 Angelos Charisteas 27'
- 3–1 Angelos Charisteas 32'
- 3–2 Paul Stalteri 42' (o.g.)
- Bochum-Werder Bremen 1–4
- 0–1 Ailton 17'
- 1–1 Paul Freier 23'
- 1–2 Angelos Charisteas 37'
- 1–3 Ailton 50'
- 1–4 Mladen Krstajić 87'
- Werder Bremen-Hansa Rostock 0–0
- Hannover-Werder Bremen 4–4
- 1–0 Nebojša Krupniković 6'
- 1–1 Frank Verlaat 10'
- 2–1 Mohamadou Idrissou 39'
- 2–2 Ailton 52'
- 2–3 Angelos Charisteas 60'
- 2–4 Johan Micoud 67'
- 3–4 Fredi Bobić 81'
- 4–4 Fredi Bobić 84'
- Werder Bremen-Borussia Dortmund 1–4
- 0–1 Torsten Frings 2'
- 1–1 Fabian Ernst 35'
- 1–2 Dedê 71'
- 1–3 Ewerthon 74'
- 1–4 Ewerthon 85'
- Werder Bremen-Bayern Munich 2–0
- 1–0 Markus Daun 17'
- 2–0 Mladen Krstajić 81'
- Wolfsburg-Werder Bremen 3–1
- 1–0 Martin Petrov 28'
- 2–0 Robson Ponte 67'
- 2–1 Johan Micoud 70'
- 3–1 Stefan Effenberg 84'
- Werder Bremen-Kaiserslautern 5–3
- 0–1 Lincoln 13'
- 1–1 Frank Verlaat 16'
- 1–2 Harry Koch 17' (pen.)
- 1–3 Christian Timm 54'
- 2–3 Miroslav Klose 61' (o.g.)
- 3–3 Ailton 77'
- 4–3 Ailton 88'
- Hertha BSC-Werder Bremen 0–1
- 0–1 Ailton 10'
- Werder Bremen-Stuttgart 3–1
- 1–0 Ailton 26'
- 1–1 Kevin Kurányi 55'
- 2–1 Mladen Krstajić 80'
- 3–1 Ailton 89'
- Schalke 04-Werder Bremen 1–1
- 0–1 Markus Daun 3'
- 1–1 Ebbe Sand 7'
- Werder Bremen-Mönchengladbach 2–0
- 1–0 Markus Daun 13'
- 2–0 Ailton 58'
- Werder Bremen-Arminia Bielefeld 2–2
- 1–0 Viktor Skrypnyk 5'
- 1–1 Mamadou Diabang 11'
- 2–1 Ailton 36'
- 2–2 Cha Doo-Ri 40'
- Hamburg-Werder Bremen 1–0
- 1–0 Sergej Barbarez 56'
- Werder Bremen-1860 Munich 1–2
- 1–0 Ivan Klasnić 45'
- 1–1 Markus Schroth 53'
- 1–2 Daniel Borimirov 82'
- Nürnberg-Werder Bremen 1–0
- 1–0 Lars Müller 42'
- Werder Bremen-Energie Cottbus 0–1
- 0–1 Marko Topić 5'
- Bayer Leverkusen-Werder Bremen 3–0
- 1–0 Daniel Bierofka 11'
- 2–0 Sebastian Schoof 50'
- 3–0 Juan 61'
- Werder Bremen-Bochum 2–0
- 1–0 Ailton 52'
- 2–0 Ivica Banović 56'
- Hansa Rostock-Werder Bremen 1–0
- 1–0 Dietmar Hirsch 71'
- Werder Bremen-Hannover 1–2
- 1–0 Ailton 10'
- 1–1 Fredi Bobić 44'
- 1–2 Fredi Bobić 76'
- Borussia Dortmund-Werder Bremen 1–2
- 1–0 Márcio Amoroso 29'
- 1–1 Angelos Charisteas 54'
- 1–2 Fabian Ernst 86'
- Bayern Munich-Werder Bremen 0–1
- 0–1 Johan Micoud 13'
- Werder Bremen-Wolfsburg 0–1
- 0–1 Marino Biliškov 85'
- Kaiserslautern-Werder Bremen 1–0
- 1–0 Miroslav Klose 65'
- Werder Bremen-Hertha BSC 4–2
- 0–1 Arne Friedrich 21'
- 1–1 Mladen Krstajić 23'
- 2–1 Ludovic Magnin 27'
- 3–1 Angelos Charisteas 36'
- 4–1 Angelos Charisteas 77'
- 4–2 Thorben Marx 79'
- Stuttgart-Werder Bremen 0–1
- 0–1 Rui Marques 50' (o.g.)
- Werder Bremen-Schalke 04 2–1
- 1–0 Angelos Charisteas 22'
- 1–1 Victor Agali 36'
- 2–1 Johan Micoud 57'
- Mönchengladbach-Werder Bremen 4–1
- 1–0 Peer Kluge 62'
- 2–0 Morten Skoubo 73'
- 3–0 Morten Skoubo 76'
- 3–1 Bernd Korzynietz 84' (o.g.)
- 4–1 Mikael Forssell 90'

== Statistics ==
=== Topscorers ===
- (Brazil) Ailton 16
- (Greece) Angelos Charisteas 9
- (France) Johan Micoud 5
- (Serbia and Montenegro) Mladen Krstajić 4

== Sources ==
Soccerbase.com – Results & Fixtures for W Bremen
