= 2001–02 SV Werder Bremen season =

Werder Bremen
2001–02 season
- Manager: Thomas Schaaf
- Bundesliga: 6th
- DFB-Pokal: Second round
- Top goalscorer: Ailton (16)
Home colours	Away colours	Third colours

SV Werder Bremen improved one position upon its 2000–01 position, ultimately finishing 6th in the championship. Key players Frank Rost and Torsten Frings departed for Bundesliga opposition in the summer of 2002, resulting in lowered expectations, especially since club legend Marco Bode decided to retire from professional football.

== Players ==
=== First-team squad ===
Squad at end of season

No.	Pos.	Nation	Player
1	GK	(Germany) GER	Frank Rost
2	DF	(Germany) GER	Fabian Ernst
3	DF	(Germany) GER	Stefan Blank
4	DF	(Canada) CAN	Paul Stalteri
5	MF	(Germany) GER	Dieter Eilts
6	MF	(Germany) GER	Frank Baumann
7	FW	(Croatia) CRO	Ivan Klasnić (Note: Klasnić was born in Hamburg, West Germany (now Germany), but also qualified to represent Croatia internationally and represented Croatia at U-19 and U-21 level before making his international debut for Croatia in February 2004.)
8	MF	(Hungary) HUN	Krisztián Lisztes
9	FW	(Federal Republic of Yugoslavia) YUG	Rade Bogdanović (Note: Bogdanović was born in Sarajevo, SFR Yugoslavia (now Bosnia and Herzegovina), but represented Yugoslavia (now Serbia, but then known as Serbia and Montenegro) internationally.)
11	MF	(Croatia) CRO	Ivica Banović
12	GK	(Poland) POL	Jakub Wierzchowski
14	DF	(Netherlands) NED	Frank Verlaat
15	FW	(Peru) PER	Roberto Silva
16	GK	(Germany) GER	Pascal Borel
17	MF	(Germany) GER	Marco Bode

No.	Pos.	Nation	Player
19	DF	(Ukraine) UKR	Viktor Skrypnyk
20	DF	(Federal Republic of Yugoslavia) YUG	Mladen Krstajić (Note: Krstajić was born in Zenica, SFR Yugoslavia (now Bosnia and Herzegovina), but was raised in FR Yugoslavia (now Serbia) and made his international debut for FC Yugoslavia in 1999.)
21	MF	(Germany) GER	Holger Wehlage
22	MF	(Germany) GER	Torsten Frings
23	DF	(Switzerland) SUI	Ludovic Magnin
24	MF	(Germany) GER	Tim Borowski
25	DF	(United States) USA	Philip Salyer
26	MF	(Germany) GER	Simon Rolfes
28	MF	(Namibia) NAM	Razundara Tjikuzu
29	FW	(Australia) AUS	Joey Di Iorio
30	FW	(Germany) GER	Enrico Kern
31	GK	(Germany) GER	Alexander Walke
32	FW	(Brazil) BRA	Ailton
33	DF	(Germany) GER	Mike Barten

=== Left club during season ===
Note: Flags indicate national team as defined under FIFA eligibility rules; some limited exceptions apply. Players may hold more than one non-FIFA nationality.

No. / Pos. / Nation / Player; 13 / DF / (Germany) GER / Andree Wiedener (to Eintracht Frankfurt)	No. / Pos. / Nation / Player; 18 / MF / (Austria) AUT / Andi Herzog (to Rapid Vienna)

=== Reserve team ===
Werder Bremen's reserve team finished 10th in the Regionalliga Nord.

Note: Flags indicate national team as defined under FIFA eligibility rules; some limited exceptions apply. Players may hold more than one non-FIFA nationality.

No.	Pos.	Nation	Player
—	GK	(Germany) GER	Pascal Borel
—	GK	(Germany) GER	Dieter Burdenski
—	GK	(Germany) GER	Frank Olschewski
—	GK	(Germany) GER	Alexander Walke
—	DF	(Germany) GER	Danny Fütterer
—	DF	(Germany) GER	Frank Kaiser
—	DF	(Germany) GER	Mario Neunaber
—	DF	(Germany) GER	Björn Schierenbeck
—	DF	(Russia) RUS	Aleksey Spasskov
—	DF	(Germany) GER	Dennis Votava
—	DF	(Germany) GER	Hannes Wilking
—	MF	(Germany) GER	Hüseyin Altindag
—	MF	(Germany) GER	Stefan Beckert
—	MF	(Germany) GER	Tim Borowski
—	MF	(Canada) CAN	Maycoll Cañizalez (Note: Cañizalez was born in Quezaltepeque, El Salvador, but was raised in Canada and represented Canada at U-17, U-20, and U-23 level before making his international debut for Canada in January 2003.)
—	MF	(Germany) GER	Christian Hasloop

No.	Pos.	Nation	Player
—	MF	(Germany) GER	Christian Lenze
—	MF	(Germany) GER	André Möller
—	MF	(Germany) GER	Simon Rolfes
—	MF	(United States) USA	Philip Salyer
—	MF	(Germany) GER	Christian Schulz
—	MF	(Germany) GER	Marco Stier
—	MF	(Namibia) NAM	Razundara Tjikuzu
—	FW	(Germany) GER	Matthias Balke
—	FW	(Germany) GER	Aydemir Demir
—	FW	(Australia) AUS	Joey Di Iorio
—	FW	(Germany) GER	Ahmet Kuru
—	FW	(Cameroon) CMR	Blaise Mamoum
—	FW	(Germany) GER	Enrico Kern
—	FW	(Germany) GER	Daniel Niemann
—	FW	(Germany) GER	Sebastian Schröer
—	FW	(Paraguay) PAR	Nelson Valdez

== Results ==
=== Bundesliga ===
- Freiburg-Werder Bremen 3–0
- 1–0 Levan Kobiashvili (50)
- 2–0 Ibrahim Tanko (87)
- 3–0 Soumaila Coulibaly (90)
- Werder Bremen-Energie Cottbus 3–2
- 1–0 Fabian Ernst (15)
- 1–1 Radosław Kałużny (25)
- 1–2 Antun Labak (29)
- 2–2 Ailton (55)
- 3–2 Ailton (64)
- Stuttgart-Werder Bremen 0–0
- Werder Bremen-1860 Munich 1–3
- 0–1 Daniel Borimirov (30)
- 1–1 Andreas Herzog (34)
- 1–2 Paul Agostino (39)
- 1–3 Markus Schroth (58)
- Kaiserslautern-Werder Bremen 2–1
- 0–1 Ivica Banović (14)
- 1–1 Hany Ramzy (64)
- 2–1 Miroslav Klose (70)
- Werder Bremen-Köln 1–1
- 0–1 Dirk Lottner (15)
- 1–1 Ailton (68)
- Hamburg-Werder Bremen 0–4
- 0–1 Ailton (14)
- 0–2 Marco Bode (30)
- 0–3 Fabian Ernst (84)
- 0–4 Paul Stalteri (86)
- Werder Bremen-Mönchengladbach 1–0
- 1–0 Frank Verlaat (84)
- Werder Bremen-Nürnberg 3–0
- 1–0 Krisztián Lisztes (4)
- 2–0 Krisztián Lisztes (56)
- 3–0 Fabian Ernst (90)
- Hertha BSC-Werder Bremen 3–1
- 1–0 Pál Dárdai (6)
- 1–1 Ailton (7)
- 2–1 Bart Goor (32)
- 3–1 Marko Rehmer (61)
- Werder Bremen-Wolfsburg 1–0
- 1–0 Marco Bode (79)
- Hansa Rostock-Werder Bremen 0–1
- 0–1 Ivan Klasnić (74)
- Werder Bremen-Bayern Munich 1–0
- 1–0 Viktor Skrypnyk (40 pen)
- Schalke 04-Werder Bremen 1–4
- 0–1 Marco Bode (20)
- 0–2 Ailton (28)
- 0–3 Krisztián Lisztes (49)
- 0–4 Viktor Skrypnyk (51 pen)
- 1–4 Ebbe Sand (58)
- Werder Bremen-Bayer Leverkusen 2–1
- 0–1 Bernd Schneider (38)
- 1–1 Marco Bode (39)
- 2–1 Frank Verlaat (58)
- St. Pauli-Werder Bremen 0–3
- 0–1 Viktor Skrypnyk (19 pen)
- 0–2 Ailton (55)
- 0–3 Tim Borowski (70)
- Werder Bremen-Borussia Dortmund 1–1
- 1–0 Torsten Frings (40)
- 1–1 Ewerthon (56)
- Werder Bremen-Freiburg 3–2
- 1–0 Marco Bode (13)
- 1–1 Soumaila Coulibaly (45 + 1)
- 2–1 Mladen Krstajić (51)
- 2–2 Andreas Zeyer (53)
- 3–2 Viktor Skrypnyk (59 pen)
- Energie Cottbus-Werder Bremen 2–1
- 0–1 Ailton (28)
- 1–1 János Mátyus (41)
- 2–1 Marko Topić (49)
- Werder Bremen-Stuttgart 1–2
- 1–0 Marco Bode (40)
- 1–1 Ioan Ganea (62)
- 1–2 Christian Tiffert (84)
- 1860 Munich-Werder Bremen 3–1
- 1–0 Paul Agostino (18)
- 1–1 Krisztián Lisztes (24)
- 2–1 Martin Max (68)
- 3–1 Thomas Häßler (74 pen)
- Werder Bremen-Kaiserslautern 1–0
- 1–0 Ailton (51)
- Köln-Werder Bremen 0–0
- Werder Bremen-Hamburg 0–1
- 0–1 Bernardo Romeo (74)
- Mönchengladbach-Werder Bremen 1–0
- 1–0 Peter Van Houdt (36)
- Nürnberg-Werder Bremen 0–4
- 0–1 Torsten Frings (6)
- 0–2 Ailton (21)
- 0–3 Ailton (30)
- 0–4 Paul Stalteri (51)
- Werder Bremen-Hertha BSC 0–3
- 0–1 Denis Lapaczinski (62)
- 0–2 Alex Alves (66)
- 0–3 Alex Alves (85)
- Wolfsburg-Werder Bremen 2–0
- 1–0 Diego Klimowicz (64)
- 2–0 Martin Petrov (78)
- Werder Bremen-Hansa Rostock 4–3
- 1–0 Ailton (3)
- 1–1 René Rydlewicz (24)
- 1–2 Antonio Di Salvo (30)
- 2–2 Torsten Frings (47)
- 2–3 Rayk Schröder (49)
- 3–3 Frank Rost (90)
- 4–3 Ailton (90 + 2 pen)
- Bayern Munich-Werder Bremen 2–2
- 1–0 Claudio Pizarro (21)
- 1–1 Ailton (24)
- 2–1 Roque Santa Cruz (55)
- 2–2 Mladen Krstajić (90 + 2)
- Werder Bremen-Schalke 04 3–0
- 1–0 Frank Baumann (24)
- 2–0 Ailton (63)
- 3–0 Torsten Frings (77)
- Bayer Leverkusen-Werder Bremen 1–2
- 0–1 Krisztián Lisztes (5)
- 1–1 Zé Roberto (31)
- 1–2 Ailton (61)
- Werder Bremen-St. Pauli 3–2
- 0–1 Christian Rahn (5)
- 0–2 Thomas Meggle (16)
- 1–2 Torsten Frings (50)
- 2–2 Marco Bode (54)
- 3–2 Torsten Frings (78)
- Borussia Dortmund-Werder Bremen 2–1
- 0–1 Paul Stalteri (17)
- 1–1 Jan Koller (41)
- 2–1 Ewerthon (74)

== Statistics ==
=== Topscorers ===
- (Brazil) Ailton 16
- (Germany) Marco Bode 7
- (Germany) Torsten Frings 6
- (Hungary) Krisztián Lisztes 5
- (Germany) Fabian Ernst 3
- (Canada) Paul Stalteri 3
