= 2003–04 SV Werder Bremen season =

Werder Bremen
2003–04 season
- Manager: Thomas Schaaf
- Bundesliga: 1st
- DFB-Pokal: Winners
- Intertoto Cup: Semi-final
- Top goalscorer: League: Aílton (28); All: Aílton (34)
Home colours	Away colours	Third colours

SV Werder Bremen won its first ever German double, clinching both Bundesliga and the DFB-Pokal. Following a club record-breaking league season, Werder won the title six points clear of Bayern Munich, with Aílton hitting 28 goals, the most ever from a Werder Bremen player. The cup victory was clinched following a 3–2 win against Alemannia Aachen, with defensive midfielder Tim Borowski the unexpected hero, hitting Alemannia with a brace. The title successes were Thomas Schaaf's first in his managerial career. Werder, however, lost both Aílton and defensive senior talisman Mladen Krstajić to FC Schalke 04, since both refused to sign new contracts with the club.

== Players ==
=== First-team squad ===
Squad at end of season

No.	Pos.	Nation	Player
1	GK	GER	Andreas Reinke
4	DF	GER	Fabian Ernst
5	DF	TUR	Ümit Davala (Note: Davala was born in Mannheim, West Germany (now Germany), but also qualified to represent Turkey internationally and made his international debut for Turkey in 1996.) (on loan from Inter Milan)
6	MF	GER	Frank Baumann
7	DF	CAN	Paul Stalteri
8	MF	HUN	Krisztián Lisztes
9	FW	GRE	Angelos Charisteas
10	MF	FRA	Johan Micoud
11	MF	CRO	Ivica Banović
15	MF	FIN	Pekka Lagerblom
16	GK	GER	Pascal Borel

No.	Pos.	Nation	Player
17	FW	CRO	Ivan Klasnić (Note: Klasnić was born in Hamburg, West Germany (now Germany), but also qualified to represent Croatia internationally and represented Croatia at U-19 and U-21 level before making his international debut for Croatia in February 2004.)
18	FW	GER	Markus Daun
19	DF	UKR	Viktor Skrypnyk
20	DF	SCG	Mladen Krstajić (Note: Krstajić was born in Zenica, SFR Yugoslavia (now Bosnia and Herzegovina), but was raised in Serbia and Montenegro (now Serbia) and made his international debut for Serbia and Montenegro in 1999.)
21	MF	GER	Holger Wehlage
23	DF	SUI	Ludovic Magnin
24	MF	GER	Tim Borowski
25	DF	FRA	Valérien Ismaël
27	DF	GER	Christian Schulz
32	FW	BRA	Ailton
38	FW	PAR	Nelson Valdez

=== Left club during season ===
Note: Flags indicate national team as defined under FIFA eligibility rules; some limited exceptions apply. Players may hold more than one non-FIFA nationality.

No.	Pos.	Nation	Player
22	MF	GER	Marco Reich (to Derby County)
34	DF	GER	Manuel Friedrich (to Mainz 05)

No.	Pos.	Nation	Player
37	MF	GER	Christian Lenze (to VfL Osnabrück)

=== Werder Bremen II ===
Note: Flags indicate national team as defined under FIFA eligibility rules; some limited exceptions apply. Players may hold more than one non-FIFA nationality.

No.	Pos.	Nation	Player
26	MF	GER	Simon Rolfes
31	GK	GER	Alexander Walke
35	MF	GER	Marco Stier
36	MF	GER	Stefan Beckert
—	DF	GER	Danny Fütterer

No.	Pos.	Nation	Player
—	DF	BIH	Damir Memišević
—	DF	GER	Björn Schierenbeck
—	MF	GER	Aaron Hunt
—	MF	CAN	Maycoll Cañizalez (Note: Cañizalez was born in Quezaltepeque, El Salvador, but was raised in Canada and represented Canada at U-17, U-20, and U-23 level before making his international debut for Canada in January 2003.)
—	FW	GER	Ahmet Kuru

=== Youth team ===
Note: Flags indicate national team as defined under FIFA eligibility rules; some limited exceptions apply. Players may hold more than one non-FIFA nationality.

No.	Pos.	Nation	Player
—	DF	GER	Jérome Polenz
—	MF	GER	Kevin Schindler

No.	Pos.	Nation	Player
—	MF	GER	Norman Theuerkauf
—	MF	BRA	Thiago Rockenbach

== Competitions ==
=== Bundesliga ===
==== League table ====
Pos	Team	Pld	W	D	L	GF	GA	GD	Pts	Qualification or relegation
1	Werder Bremen (C)	34	22	8	4	79	38	+41	74	Qualification to Champions League group stage
2	Bayern Munich	34	20	8	6	70	39	+31	68	Qualification to Champions League group stage
3	Bayer Leverkusen	34	19	8	7	73	39	+34	65	Qualification to Champions League third qualifying round
4	VfB Stuttgart	34	18	10	6	52	24	+28	64	Qualification to UEFA Cup first round
5	VfL Bochum	34	15	11	8	57	39	+18	56	Qualification to UEFA Cup first round

Source: kicker.de
Rules for classification: 1) points; 2) goal difference; 3) number of goals scored.
(C) Champions

2 August 2003 1	Hertha BSC	0–3	Werder Bremen	Berlin
15:30			Aílton 18', 65'; Micoud 21'	Stadium: Berlin Olympic Stadium; Attendance: 40,152; Referee: Herbert Fandel

9 August 2003 2	Werder Bremen	1–1	Borussia Mönchengladbach	Bremen
15:30	Aílton 64' (pen.)		Van Hout 81'	Stadium: Weserstadion; Attendance: 30,100; Referee: Stefan Trautmann

16 August 2003 3	Kaiserslautern	0–1	Werder Bremen	Kaiserslautern
15:30			Micoud 66'	Stadium: Fritz-Walter-Stadion; Attendance: 36,000; Referee: Franz–Xaver Wack

23 August 2003 4	Werder Bremen	4–1	Schalke 04	Bremen
15:30	Charisteas 4'; Borowski 28'; Aílton 35'; Valdez 81'		Agali 82'	Stadium: Weserstadion; Attendance: 34,500; Referee: Edgar Steinborn

13 September 2003 5	Borussia Dortmund	2–1	Werder Bremen	Dortmund
15:30	Ewerthon 17'; Ismaël 70' (o.g.)		Lisztes 41'	Stadium: Westfalenstadion; Attendance: 80,500; Referee: Lutz Wagner

20 September 2003 6	Werder Bremen	2–1	1860 Munich	Bremen
15:30	Aílton 48' (pen.); Micoud 66'		Schroth 57'	Stadium: Weserstadion; Attendance: 32,000; Referee: Herbert Fandel

27 September 2003 7	Köln	1–4	Werder Bremen	Cologne
15:30	Scherz 79'		Micoud 11'; Klasnić 40'; Stalteri 70'; Charisteas 90+2'	Stadium: Müngersdorfer Stadion; Attendance: 33,000; Referee: Markus Merk

5 October 2003 8	Werder Bremen	5–3	VfL Wolfsburg	Bremen
17:30	Aílton 2', 21'; Stalteri 41'; Micoud 57'; Klasnić 58'		Biliskov 40'; Streit 54'; Karhan 64'	Stadium: Weserstadion; Attendance: 31,800; Referee: Jürgen Jansen

18 October 2003 9	Werder Bremen	1–3	VfB Stuttgart	Bremen
15:30	Charisteas 60'		Szabics 29'; Kurányi 34'; Tiffert 90'	Stadium: Weserstadion; Attendance: 41,100; Referee: Thorsten Kinhöfer

25 October 2003 10	SC Freiburg	2–4	Werder Bremen	Freiburg
15:30	Iashvili 60', 90'		Aílton 14', 28'; Micoud 37'; Klasnić 65'	Stadium: Dreisamstadion; Attendance: 24,000; Referee: Edgar Steinborn

1 November 2003 11	Werder Bremen	3–1	Eintracht Frankfurt	Bremen
15:30	Aílton 18'; Baumann 25'; Klasnić 71'		Chris 67'	Stadium: Weserstadion; Attendance: 34,600; Referee: Hermann Albrecht

8 November 2003 12	Hannover 96	1–5	Werder Bremen	Hanover
15:30	Stajner 55'		Valdez 8', 38'; Klasnić 41', 79'; Ernst 87'	Stadium: Niedersachsenstadion; Attendance: 25,900; Referee: Wolfgang Stark

22 November 2003 13	Werder Bremen	3–1	VfL Bochum	Bremen
15:30	Aílton 6', 15', 50' (pen.)		Fahrenhorst 75'	Stadium: Weserstadion; Attendance: 34,298; Referee: Markus Merk

29 November 2003 14	Hamburger SV	1–1	Werder Bremen	Hamburg
15:30	Rahn 50'		Ernst 27'	Stadium: Volksparkstadion; Attendance: 55,500; Referee: Herbert Fandel

6 December 2003 15	Werder Bremen	1–1	Bayern Munich	Bremen
15:30	Aílton 58' (pen.)		Pizarro 79'	Stadium: Weserstadion; Attendance: 43,000; Referee: Knut Kircher

13 December 2003 16	Bayer Leverkusen	1–3	Werder Bremen	Leverkusen
15:30	Nowotny 72'		Aílton 42'; Krstajić 44'; Lisztes 90'	Stadium: BayArena; Attendance: 22,500; Referee: Uwe Kemmling

16 December 2003 17	Werder Bremen	3–0	Hansa Rostock	Bremen
20:00	Aílton 3'; Ismaël 78'; Lisztes 89'			Stadium: Weserstadion; Attendance: 36,000; Referee: Lutz-Michael Fröhlich

31 January 2004 18	Werder Bremen	4–0	Hertha BSC	Bremen
15:30	Aílton 18', 30'; Micoud 34'; Valdez 90+1'			Stadium: Weserstadion; Attendance: 34,500; Referee: Markus Merk

7 February 2004 19	Borussia Mönchengladbach	1–2	Werder Bremen	Mönchengladbach
15:30	Sverkos 51'		Klasnić 54'; Baumann 90'	Stadium: Bökelbergstadion; Attendance: 28,650; Referee: Torsten Koop

15 February 2004 20	Werder Bremen	1–0	Kaiserslautern	Bremen
17:30	Aílton 90' (pen.)			Stadium: Weserstadion; Attendance: 36,900; Referee: Knut Kircher

21 February 2004 21	Schalke 04	0–0	Werder Bremen	Gelsenkirchen
15:30				Stadium: Arena AufSchalke; Attendance: 61,266; Referee: Franz–Xaver Wack

28 February 2004 22	Werder Bremen	2–0	Borussia Dortmund	Bremen
15:30	Ismaël 57'; Aílton 86'			Stadium: Weserstadion; Attendance: 43,000; Referee: Lutz Wagner

7 March 2004 23	1860 Munich	0–2	Werder Bremen	Munich
17:30			Klasnić 38'; Charisteas 79'	Stadium: Munich Olympic Stadium; Attendance: 25,000; Referee: Jürgen Jansen

13 March 2004 24	Werder Bremen	3–2	Köln	Bremen
15:30	Micoud 16'; Aílton 37', 43'		Schröder 57'; Lottner 70'	Stadium: Weserstadion; Attendance: 39,600; Referee: Edgar Steinborn

21 March 2004 25	VfL Wolfsburg	0–2	Werder Bremen	Wolfsburg
17:30			Klasnić 75'; Micoud 85'	Stadium: Volkswagen Arena; Attendance: 30,000; Referee: Markus Merk

28 March 2004 26	VfB Stuttgart	4–4	Werder Bremen	Stuttgart
17:30	Bordon 3', 24', 50'; Streller 59'		Klasnić 13', 35'; Aílton 43', 70'	Stadium: Gottlieb-Daimler-Stadion; Attendance: 48,000; Referee: Herbert Fandel

4 April 2004 27	Werder Bremen	1–1	SC Freiburg	Bremen
17:30	Aílton 18'		Kruppke 1'	Stadium: Weserstadion; Attendance: 42,500; Referee: Jörg Keßler

10 April 2004 28	Eintracht Frankfurt	0–1	Werder Bremen	Frankfurt
15:30			Ismaël 80' (pen.)	Stadium: Waldstadion; Attendance: 33,000; Referee: Jürgen Jansen

18 April 2004 29	Werder Bremen	0–0	Hannover 96	Bremen
17:30				Stadium: Weserstadion; Attendance: 43,000; Referee: Hermann Albrecht

25 April 2004 30	VfL Bochum	0–0	Werder Bremen	Bochum
17:30				Stadium: Ruhrstadion; Attendance: 32,600; Referee: Helmut Fleischer

1 May 2004 31	Werder Bremen	6–0	Hamburger SV	Bremen
15:30	Barbarez 17' (o.g.); Ismaël 22'; Klasnić 39'; Aílton 48'; Valdez 80'; Skrypnyk 84' (pen.)			Stadium: Weserstadion; Attendance: 42,500; Referee: Lutz-Michael Fröhlich

8 May 2004 32	Bayern Munich	1–3	Werder Bremen	Munich
15:30	Makaay 56'		Klasnić 19'; Micoud 26'; Aílton 35'	Stadium: Munich Olympic Stadium; Attendance: 63,000; Referee: Edgar Steinborn

15 May 2004 33	Werder Bremen	2–6	Bayer Leverkusen	Bremen
15:30	Krstajić 50'; Aílton 54'		França 7', 21', 61'; Bierofka 13'; Berbatov 65'; Neuville 80'	Stadium: Weserstadion; Attendance: 42,500; Referee: Markus Merk

22 May 2004 34	Hansa Rostock	3–1	Werder Bremen	Rostock
15:30	Prica 30'; Krstajić 47' (o.g.); Lantz 72' (pen.)		Krstajić 38'	Stadium: Ostseestadion; Attendance: 25,000; Referee: Jürgen Jansen

=== DFB-Pokal ===
30 August 2003 First round	Ludwigsfelder FC	1–9	Werder Bremen	Ludwigsfelde
15:30	Fricke 80'		Borowski 8', 27', 81'; Aílton 31' (pen.), 50', 58' (pen.); Klasnić 67', 89'; Banović 73'	Stadium: Waldstadion; Attendance: 4,000; Referee: Robert Hoyzer

28 October 2003 Second round	Werder Bremen	3–1 (a.e.t.)	VfL Wolfsburg	Bremen
19:30	Aílton 55'; Micoud 95'; Charisteas 101'		Thiam 6'	Stadium: Weserstadion; Attendance: 15,000; Referee: Knut Kircher

3 December 2003 Round of 16	Werder Bremen	6–1	Hertha BSC	Bremen
19:30	Klasnić 19', 37'; Micoud 26'; Ismaël 47'; Aílton 78'; Charisteas 85'		Marcelinho 89'	Stadium: Weserstadion; Attendance: 22,100; Referee: Jürgen Jansen

3 February 2004 Quarter-finals	SpVgg Greuther Fürth	2–3	Werder Bremen	Fürth
20:30	Ismaël 74' (o.g.); Feinbier 76'		Stalteri 18'; Micoud 90'; Klasnić 90'	Stadium: Sportpark Ronhof Thomas Sommer; Attendance: 14,500; Referee: Thorsten Kinhöfer

16 March 2004 Semi-finals	Werder Bremen	3–2 (a.e.t.)	VfB Lübeck	Bremen
20:30	Micoud 54'; Aílton 111'; Valdez 114'		Krstajić 11' (o.g.); Zandi 94'	Stadium: Weserstadion; Attendance: 38,700; Referee: Lutz–Michael Fröhlich

29 May 2004 Final	Werder Bremen	3–2	Alemannia Aachen	Berlin
20:00	Borowski 31', 84'; Klasnić 45'		Blank 52'; Meijer 90'	Stadium: Olympiastadion; Attendance: 71,682; Referee: Herbert Fandel

== Statistics ==
=== Topscorers ===
- (Brazil) Aílton 28
- (Croatia) Ivan Klasnić 13
- (France) Johan Micoud 10
- (Paraguay) Nelson Valdez 5

== Sources ==
Results & Fixtures for W Bremen – soccerbase.com
