= 2004–05 SV Werder Bremen season =

SV Werder Bremen
2004–05 season
- Manager: Thomas Schaaf
- Bundesliga: 3rd
- DFB-Pokal: Second stage
- Champions League: Round of 16
- DFL-Ligapokal: Runners-up
- Top goalscorer: League: Miroslav Klose (15); All: Ivan Klasnić (19)
Home colours	Away colours

During the 2004-05 season, SV Werder Bremen played in the Bundesliga, the highest tier of the German football league system.

== Season summary ==
Werder Bremen never came close to retaining their Bundesliga title and finished 18 points behind champions Bayern Munich. This was still good enough for another season in the Champions League, albeit entering in the third qualifying round. The club also failed to retain its DFB-Pokal crown, being eliminated in the semi-finals by Schalke.

== Players ==
=== First-team squad ===
Squad at end of season

No.	Pos.	Nation	Player
1	GK	GER	Andreas Reinke
2	DF	GER	Frank Fahrenhorst
3	DF	FIN	Petri Pasanen
4	DF	GER	Fabian Ernst
5	DF	TUR	Ümit Davala (Note: Davala was born in Mannheim, West Germany, but also qualified to represent Turkey internationally and made his international debut for Turkey in 1996.)
6	MF	GER	Frank Baumann
7	DF	CAN	Paul Stalteri
8	MF	HUN	Krisztián Lisztes
10	MF	FRA	Johan Micoud
11	FW	GER	Miroslav Klose (Note: Klose was born in Opole, Poland, but was raised in Germany from the age of 8 and made his international debut for Germany in March 2001.)
14	MF	GER	Aaron Hunt
16	GK	GER	Pascal Borel
17	FW	CRO	Ivan Klasnić (Note: Klasnić was born in Hamburg, West Germany, but also qualified to represent Croatia internationally and represented Croatia at U-19 and U-21 level before making his international debut for Croatia in February 2004.)
20	MF	DEN	Daniel Jensen
21	FW	EGY	Mohamed Zidan (on loan from Midtjylland)
22	DF	GER	Francis Banecki

No.	Pos.	Nation	Player
23	DF	SUI	Ludovic Magnin
24	MF	GER	Tim Borowski
25	DF	FRA	Valérien Ismaël
26	DF	GER	Florian Mohr
27	DF	GER	Christian Schulz
28	DF	GER	Florian Heidenreich
29	MF	GER	Daniel Brückner (Note: Brückner was born in Rostock, East Germany (now Germany), but also qualified to represent Algeria internationally through his father.)
30	GK	GER	Michael Jürgen
31	GK	GER	Alexander Walke
33	FW	GER	Deniz Kacan
35	MF	GER	Marco Stier
36	MF	GER	Stefan Beckert
37	MF	GER	Kevin Wittke
38	FW	PAR	Nelson Valdez
39	GK	GER	Christopher Möllering

=== Left club during season ===
Note: Flags indicate national team as defined under FIFA eligibility rules; some limited exceptions apply. Players may hold more than one non-FIFA nationality.

No.	Pos.	Nation	Player
9	FW	GRE	Angelos Charisteas (to Ajax)
13	DF	BRA	Gustavo Nery (on loan to Corinthians)

No.	Pos.	Nation	Player
15	MF	FIN	Pekka Lagerblom (on loan to 1. FC Nürnberg)
19	DF	GER	Robert Paul (to Wacker Burghausen)

=== Werder Bremen II ===
Note: Flags indicate national team as defined under FIFA eligibility rules; some limited exceptions apply. Players may hold more than one non-FIFA nationality.

No.	Pos.	Nation	Player
—	DF	GER	Jérome Polenz
—	DF	BIH	Damir Memišević
—	DF	GER	Björn Schierenbeck

No.	Pos.	Nation	Player
—	MF	GER	Danny Fütterer
—	MF	BRA	Thiago Rockenbach

=== Youth team ===
Note: Flags indicate national team as defined under FIFA eligibility rules; some limited exceptions apply. Players may hold more than one non-FIFA nationality.

No. / Pos. / Nation / Player; — / MF / GER / Kevin Schindler	No. / Pos. / Nation / Player; — / MF / GER / Norman Theuerkauf
