= 1999–2000 SV Werder Bremen season =

SV Werder Bremen
1999–2000 season
- Manager: Thomas Schaaf
- Stadium: Weser-Stadion
- Bundesliga: 9th
- DFB-Pokal: Runners-up
- UEFA Cup: Quarter-finals
- Top goalscorer: League: Marco Bode (13); All: Marco Bode (18)
Home colours	Third colours

During the 1999–2000 season, SV Werder Bremen played in the 1. Bundesliga, the highest tier of the German football league system.

== Season summary ==
Having barely escaped relegation last season, Bremen rose to 9th in the final table - 6 points off Champions League qualification. The club also qualified for the UEFA Cup again, giving them the chance to improve on that season's run to the quarter-finals. The team also reached the DFB-Pokal final for the second season running, but lost to Bayern Munich.

== First team squad ==
Squad at end of season

No.	Pos.	Nation	Player
1	GK	(Germany) GER	Frank Rost
3	MF	(Switzerland) SUI	Raphael Wicky
4	MF	(Germany) GER	Dirk Flock
5	MF	(Germany) GER	Dieter Eilts
6	MF	(Germany) GER	Frank Baumann
7	MF	(Ukraine) UKR	Yuriy Maksymov
8	DF	(Germany) GER	Bernhard Trares
9	FW	(Federal Republic of Yugoslavia) YUG	Rade Bogdanović (Note: Bogdanović was born in Sarajevo, SFR Yugoslavia (now Bosnia and Herzegovina), but represented Yugoslavia internationally.)
10	FW	(Peru) PER	Claudio Pizarro
11	DF	(Poland) POL	Jacek Chańko
12	GK	(Germany) GER	Stefan Brasas
13	DF	(Germany) GER	Andree Wiedener
15	DF	(Germany) GER	Dieter Frey
16	GK	(Germany) GER	Pascal Borel
17	MF	(Germany) GER	Marco Bode

No.	Pos.	Nation	Player
18	MF	(Austria) AUT	Andi Herzog
19	DF	(Ukraine) UKR	Viktor Skrypnyk
22	MF	(Germany) GER	Torsten Frings
23	MF	(Germany) GER	Christoph Dabrowski
25	MF	(Germany) GER	Sören Seidel
26	MF	(Germany) GER	Timo Schultz
27	MF	(Germany) GER	Alexander Nouri
28	MF	(Namibia) NAM	Razundara Tjikuzu
29	DF	(Germany) GER	Matthias Plump
32	FW	(Brazil) BRA	Ailton
33	DF	(Germany) GER	Mike Barten
35	DF	(Canada) CAN	Paul Stalteri
36	DF	(Brazil) BRA	Julio Cesar
38	DF	(Germany) GER	Björn Schierenbeck
39	MF	(Germany) GER	Danny Fütterer

=== Left club during season ===
Note: Flags indicate national team as defined under FIFA eligibility rules; some limited exceptions apply. Players may hold more than one non-FIFA nationality.

No.	Pos.	Nation	Player
2	MF	(Netherlands) NED	Lodewijk Roembiak (on loan to FC Aarau)
20	FW	(Germany) GER	Dirk Weetendorf (to Eintracht Braunschweig)

No.	Pos.	Nation	Player
24	MF	(Germany) GER	Sven Benken (to Hansa Rostock)
30	DF	(Poland) POL	Paweł Wojtala (to Legia Warsaw)
