= 2005–06 SV Werder Bremen season =

SV Werder Bremen
2005–06 season
- Manager: Thomas Schaaf
- Bundesliga: 2nd
- DFB-Pokal: Quarter-finals
- Champions League: Round of 16
- DFL-Ligapokal: Semi-finals
- Top goalscorer: League: Miroslav Klose (25); All: Miroslav Klose (31)
| Home colours | Away colours | Third colours |

During the 2005–06 season, SV Werder Bremen played in the Bundesliga, the highest tier of the German football league system.

== Season summary ==
Werder Bremen climbed to second place in the final table, 5 points behind Bayern Munich. They were also the league's highest scoring team, with 79. Miroslav Klose was the league's top scorer with 25.

== Players ==
=== First-team squad ===
Squad at end of season

| No. | Pos. | Nation | Player |
|---|---|---|---|
| 1 | GK | GER | Andreas Reinke |
| 2 | DF | GER | Frank Fahrenhorst |
| 3 | DF | FIN | Petri Pasanen |
| 4 | DF | BRA | Naldo |
| 6 | MF | GER | Frank Baumann |
| 7 | MF | CRO | Jurica Vranješ |
| 9 | FW | PAR | Nelson Valdez |
| 10 | MF | FRA | Johan Micoud |
| 11 | FW | GER | Miroslav Klose (Note: Klose was born in Opole, Poland, but was raised in Germany from the age of 8 and made his international debut for Germany in March 2001.) |
| 14 | MF | GER | Aaron Hunt |
| 15 | DF | GER | Patrick Owomoyela |
| 16 | MF | DEN | Leon Andreasen |
| 17 | FW | CRO | Ivan Klasnić (Note: Klasnić was born in Hamburg, West Germany, but also qualified to represent Croatia internationally and represented Croatia at U-19 and U-21 level before making his international debut for Croatia in February 2004.) |

| No. | Pos. | Nation | Player |
|---|---|---|---|
| 18 | GK | GER | Tim Wiese |
| 19 | MF | FIN | Pekka Lagerblom |
| 20 | MF | DEN | Daniel Jensen |
| 22 | MF | GER | Torsten Frings |
| 23 | DF | BEL | Jelle Van Damme (on loan from Southampton) |
| 24 | MF | GER | Tim Borowski |
| 25 | MF | GER | Francis Banecki |
| 26 | DF | GER | Florian Mohr |
| 27 | DF | GER | Christian Schulz |
| 29 | DF | GER | Jérome Polenz |
| 30 | GK | DEN | Kasper Jensen |
| 33 | GK | GER | Christian Vander (on loan from VfL Bochum) |
| 35 | MF | GER | Marco Stier |

=== Left club during season ===
Note: Flags indicate national team as defined under FIFA eligibility rules; some limited exceptions apply. Players may hold more than one non-FIFA nationality.

| No. / Pos. / Nation / Player; 5 / DF / TUR / Ümit Davala (Note: Davala was born in Mannheim, West Germany, but also qualified to represent Turkey internationally and made his international debut for Turkey in 1996.) (retired) | No. / Pos. / Nation / Player; 21 / FW / EGY / Mohamed Zidan (on loan to Mainz 05) |

=== Werder Bremen II ===
Note: Flags indicate national team as defined under FIFA eligibility rules; some limited exceptions apply. Players may hold more than one non-FIFA nationality.

| No. | Pos. | Nation | Player |
|---|---|---|---|
| — | DF | GER | Sebastian Schachten |
| — | DF | GER | Björn Schierenbeck |
| — | DF | GER | Sandro Stallbaum |

| No. | Pos. | Nation | Player |
|---|---|---|---|
| — | MF | GER | Daniel Brückner (Note: Brückner was born in Rostock, East Germany (now Germany), but also qualified to represent Algeria internationally through his father.) |
| — | MF | POR | Amaury Bischoff (Note: Bischoff was born in Colmar, France, and represented France at U-18 level, but also qualified to represent Portugal internationally through his mother and represented Portugal at U-21 level.) |
| — | MF | BRA | Thiago Rockenbach |

=== Youth team ===
Note: Flags indicate national team as defined under FIFA eligibility rules; some limited exceptions apply. Players may hold more than one non-FIFA nationality.

| No. | Pos. | Nation | Player |
|---|---|---|---|
| — | GK | GER | Sebastian Mielitz |
| — | DF | GER | Alexander Hessel |
| — | DF | GER | Felix Schiller |

| No. | Pos. | Nation | Player |
|---|---|---|---|
| — | MF | GER | Tobias Kempe |
| — | MF | GER | Kevin Schindler |
| — | MF | GER | Norman Theuerkauf |
