= Tim Borowski =

German footballer (born 1980)

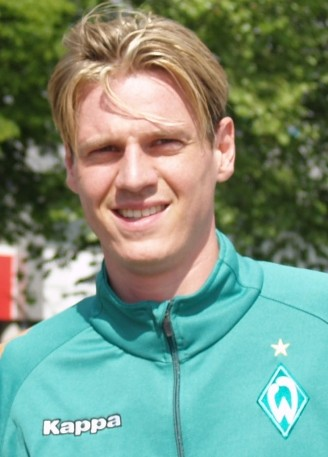
- Borowski with Werder Bremen in 2007

Personal information
- Full name: Tim Borowski
- Date of birth: 2 May 1980 (age 46)
- Place of birth: Neubrandenburg, East Germany
- Height: 1.94 m (6 ft 4 in)
- Position: Midfielder

Youth career
- 1985–1996: Neubrandenburg 04
- 1996–1999: Werder Bremen

Senior career*
Years	Team	Apps	(Gls)
1999–2001	Werder Bremen II	58	(12)
2000–2008	Werder Bremen	169	(23)
2008–2009	Bayern Munich	26	(5)
2009–2012	Werder Bremen	41	(4)
Total		294	(44)

International career
1999–2001	Germany U21	15	(0)
2002–2004	Germany B	5	(0)
2002–2008	Germany	33	(2)

Managerial career
- 2017: Werder Bremen youth (assistant manager)
- 2017–2021: Werder Bremen (assistant manager)
- * Club domestic league appearances and goals

Tim Borowski (born 2 May 1980) is a German football manager and former player.

A midfielder, Borowski spent 11 years of his 12-year professional career with Werder Bremen, amassing Bundesliga totals of 236 games and 32 goals and winning three major titles, including the 2004 national championship. He played 33 times and scored twice for the Germany national team from 2002 to 2008, representing Germany at the 2006 World Cup and Euro 2008.

== Club career ==
=== Werder Bremen ===
Born in Neubrandenburg, Bezirk Neubrandenburg, East Germany, Borowski started his career at hometown club 1. FC Neubrandenburg 04, where he was spotted by SV Werder Bremen and signed at the age of 16 for its junior teams. He spent two full seasons with the reserves, competing mainly in Regionalliga Nord.

Borowski made his official debut for Werder on 26 August 2000, starting in a 0–1 home loss against VfL Wolfsburg for the DFB-Pokal. He was definitely promoted to the main squad early into the following campaign.

Borowski contributed with 25 games and one goal (against FC Schalke 04 in a 4–1 home win) in 2003–04 as the Hanseatic won their fourth national championship, the first in 11 years. He added career highs of ten goals and 11 assists in the 2005–06 season, helping his team to a final second position; in the latter campaign's UEFA Champions League he also scored against Juventus FC for a 3–2 round-of-16 first leg home win, in an eventual away goals rule exit.

=== Bayern Munich ===
Borowski joined FC Bayern Munich in the 2008 summer after the move was made effective in January, in a free transfer. He finished his first and only season with 30 appearances all competitions comprised. In this season, he appeared in the Champions League seven times and scored there once, he scored in the DFB-Pokal too, and in the Bundesliga five times. In the Bundesliga, he managed to establish himself in the starting eleven six times, in the DFB-Pokal twice, and in the Champions League also twice.

=== Return to Werder ===
Borowski returned to Werder Bremen on 22 July 2009, signing a three-year contract. After featuring in only 13 league matches in his last two years combined he was released by his main club, and retired from football shortly after due to injury, aged 32.

In the summer of 2014, Borowski completed his 18-month traineeship in the marketing department which he had been going through since January 2013 at Werder Bremen. In April of the following year, he signed a contract until July 2018 as sports director for the reserve team.

== International career ==
Borowski gained his first cap for Germany on 21 August 2002, appearing as a late substitute in a 2–2 friendly draw with Bulgaria in Sofia. He was selected by manager Jürgen Klinsmann for the 2006 FIFA World Cup on home soil, filling in for captain Michael Ballack in the opener against Costa Rica (4–2 triumph).

Borowski then proceeded to collect a further four substitute appearances: in the quarter-final against Argentina he made a superb assist for Bremen teammate Miroslav Klose to score the equalizing goal for Germany, and also converted his penalty shootout attempt as it ended 4–2 for the hosts. He started in the following match against Italy, leaving injured in an eventual 0–2 loss.

Borowski also participated at the 2005 FIFA Confederations Cup (three minutes against Brazil in the semi-finals) and UEFA Euro 2008 (two substitute appearances for the runners-up).

== Post-playing career ==
Next to manager Florian Kohfeldt, Borowski became part of the coaching team in 2017. Prior to this, he assisted at one of the club's youth level teams (U17). He worked to acquire the fourth and final DFB manager license in 2020.

== Career statistics ==
=== Club ===
Appearances and goals by club, season and competition
Club	Season	League			National cup		League cup		Continental		Total		Ref.
Club	Season	Division	Apps	Goals	Apps	Goals	Apps	Goals	Apps	Goals	Apps	Goals	Ref.
Werder Bremen II	1999–2000	Regionalliga Nord	29	6	2	0	–		–		31	6	
Werder Bremen II	2000–01	Regionalliga Nord	27	5	1	0	–		–		28	5	
Werder Bremen II	2001–02	Regionalliga Nord	2	1	1	1	–		–		3	2	
Werder Bremen II	Total		58	12	4	1	0	0	0	0	62	13	–
Werder Bremen	2001–02	Bundesliga	26	1	2	1	–		2	0	30	2	
Werder Bremen	2002–03	Bundesliga	18	0	4	0	0	0	2	2	24	2	
Werder Bremen	2003–04	Bundesliga	25	1	5	5	–		1	0	31	6	
Werder Bremen	2004–05	Bundesliga	31	7	5	3	2	0	6	0	44	10	
Werder Bremen	2005–06	Bundesliga	31	10	3	0	2	0	9	3	45	13	
Werder Bremen	2006–07	Bundesliga	17	2	0	0	1	0	6	1	24	3	
Werder Bremen	2007–08	Bundesliga	21	2	3	1	1	1	7	0	32	4	
Werder Bremen	Total		169	23	22	10	6	1	33	6	230	40	–
Bayern Munich	2008–09	Bundesliga	26	5	2	1	–		7	1	35	7	
Werder Bremen	2009–10	Bundesliga	28	4	6	1	–		11	1	45	6	
Werder Bremen	2010–11	Bundesliga	12	0	1	1	–		4	0	17	1	
Werder Bremen	2011–12	Bundesliga	1	0	1	0	–		–		2	0	
Werder Bremen	Total		41	4	8	2	0	0	15	1	64	7	–
Career total			294	44	36	14	6	1	55	8	391	67	–

=== International ===
Appearances and goals by national team and year
National team	Year	Apps	Goals
Germany	2002	2	0
Germany	2004	5	0
Germany	2005	8	1
Germany	2006	13	1
Germany	2007	3	0
Germany	2008	2	0
Total		33	2

Scores and results list Germany's goal tally first, score column indicates score after each Borowski goal.

List of international goals scored by Tim Borowski
No.	Date	Venue	Opponent	Score	Result	Competition
1	7 September 2005	Weserstadion, Bremen, Germany	South Africa	2–1	4–2	Friendly
2	2 June 2006	Borussia-Park, Mönchengladbach, Germany	Colombia	3–0	3–0	Friendly

== Honours ==
Werder Bremen

- Bundesliga: 2003–04
- DFB-Pokal: 2003–04; runner-up: 2009–10
- DFB-Ligapokal: 2006; runner-up: 2004

Germany

- UEFA European Championship runner-up: 2008
- FIFA World Cup third place: 2006
- FIFA Confederations Cup third place: 2005
