= Fabian Ernst =

German footballer (born 1979)

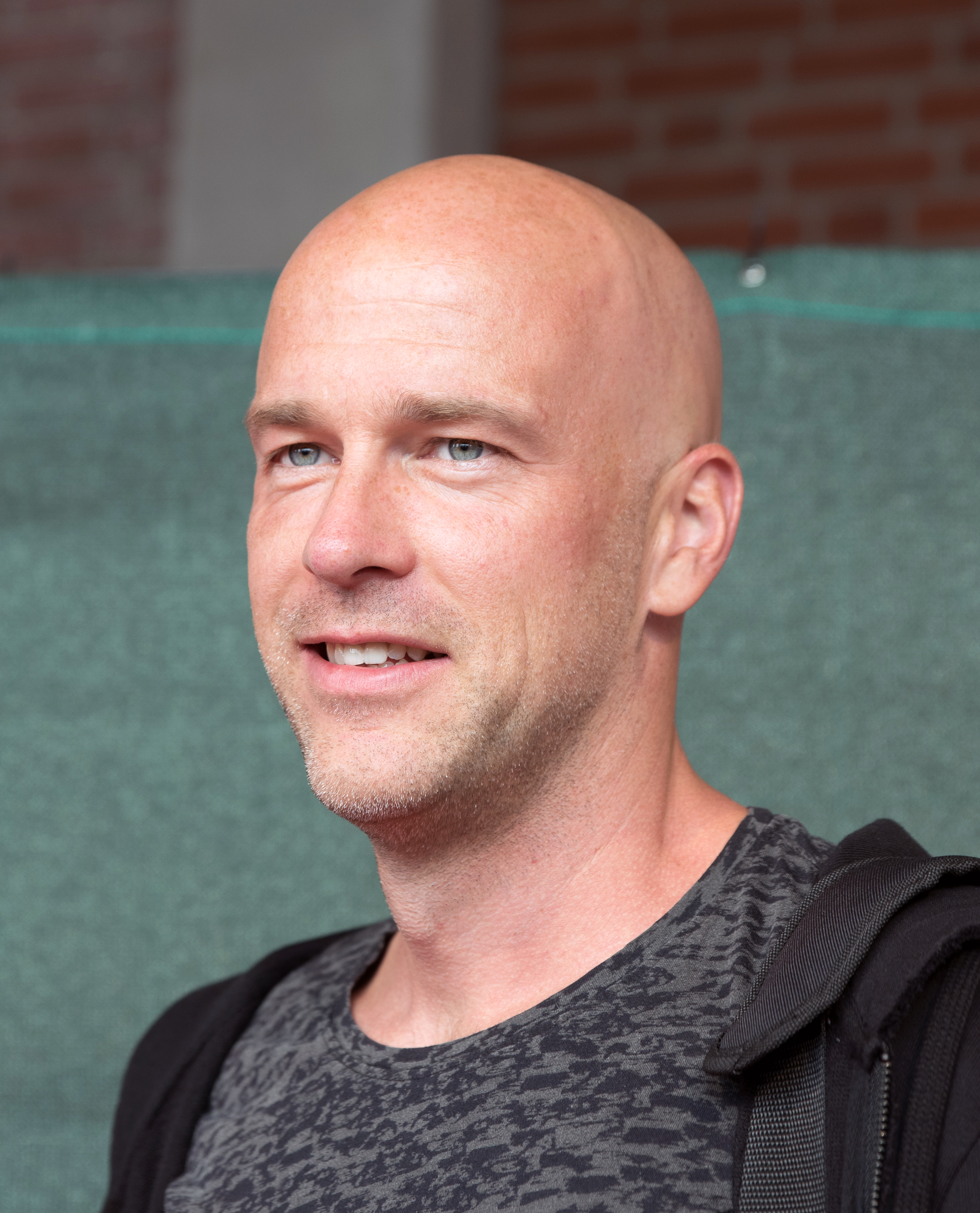
- Ernst in 2016

Personal information
- Date of birth: 30 May 1979 (age 47)
- Place of birth: Hanover, West Germany
- Height: 1.83 m (6 ft 0 in)
- Position: Midfielder

Youth career
- 1983–1996: Hannover 96

Senior career*
Years	Team	Apps	(Gls)
1996–1998	Hannover 96	54	(1)
1998–2000	Hamburger SV	48	(0)
2000–2005	Werder Bremen	152	(11)
2005–2009	Schalke 04	106	(1)
2009–2012	Beşiktaş	99	(7)
2012–2013	Kasımpaşa	30	(0)
2014–2015	OSV Hannover	24	(8)
Total		513	(28)

International career
1998–2001	Germany U-21	31	(0)
2002–2003	Germany Team 2006	3	(0)
2002–2006	Germany	24	(1)
- * Club domestic league appearances and goals

Fabian Ernst (German pronunciation: [ˈfaːbi̯aːn ˈʔɛʁnst]; born 30 May 1979) is a German former professional footballer who played as a midfielder. He was regarded as a two-way player who can stop the opposition and start attacks with his passing from central midfield.

== Club career ==
Born in Hanover, Ernst started his career with hometown club Hannover 96. From 1998 to 2000, he played for Hamburger SV in the Bundesliga, playing in 48 games.

The midfielder moved to Werder Bremen in 2000, where he was a major force in the league helping the club win the double of Bundesliga and DFB-Pokal in the 2003–04 season. In 152 games in the Bundesliga, he scored 11 goals.

He moved to Schalke 04 in summer 2005, spending three and a half years there. He joined Beşiktaş on 2 February 2009, signing a contract which lasted until 2012. In his first season with Beşiktaş he scored two goals. At the end of the season, he was elected "The Best Player Of The Team" by the supporters.

On 16 September 2010, Ernst headed in a last-minute goal against Bulgarian side CSKA Sofia to help his team to a winning start in the group stages of the UEFA Europa League. In the 2012–13 season, he joined Kasımpaşa, another football club headquartered in Istanbul. He was also captain of the team. In June 2013, he announced that he was thinking about retirement.

After a career break from the summer 2013 until the summer 2014, Ernst signed a contract with OSV Hannover although he had bids from other bigger clubs.

== International career ==
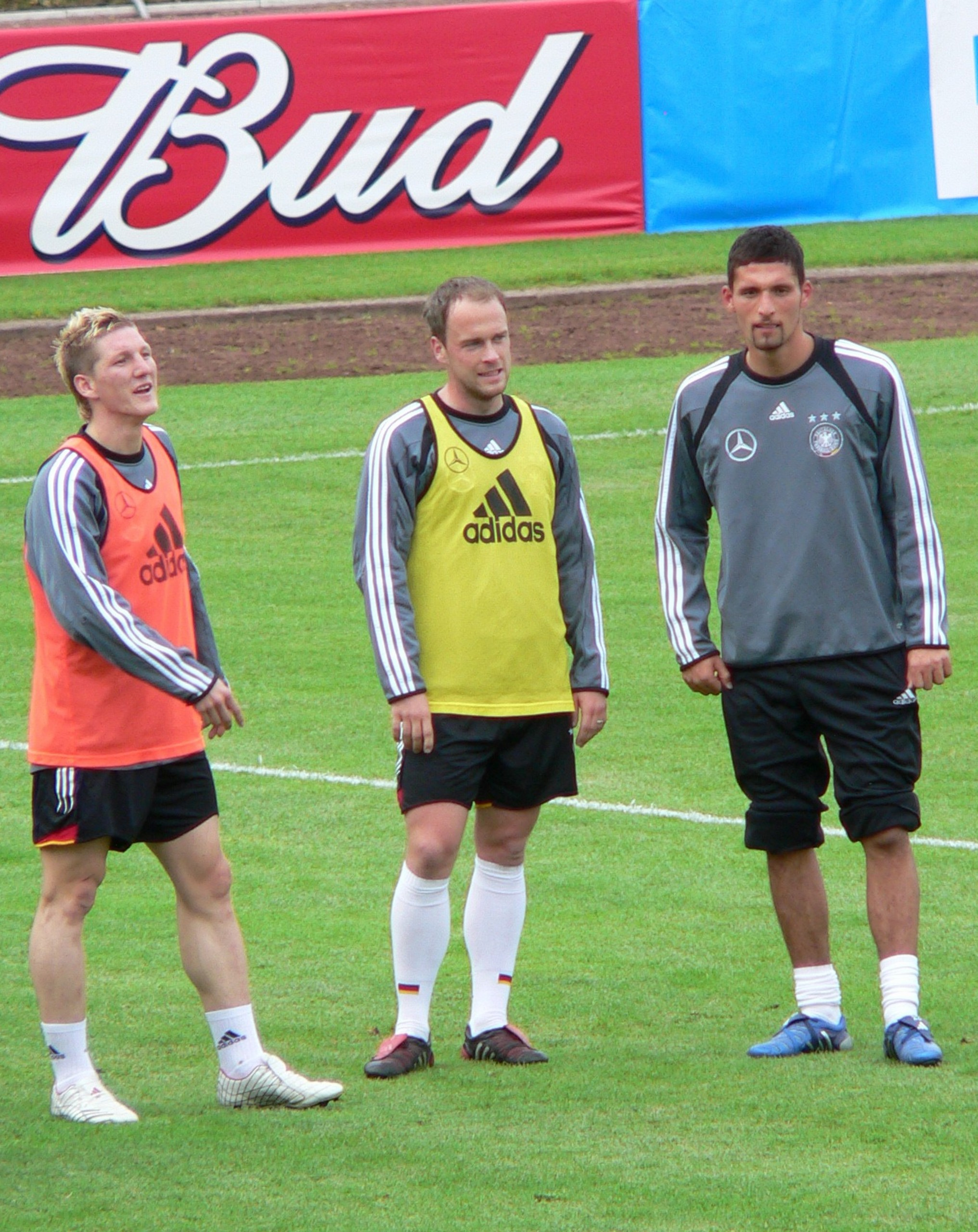
Ernst (centre) with Bastian Schweinsteiger (left) and Kevin Kurányi in the German national team

In 2002, Ernst played his first international game, representing Germany against Kuwait. Ernst was a member of the German squad at Euro 2004. As of the end of 2007, he had won 24 caps and scored one goal for his country.

After that first season by Schalke 04, he found himself not being selected by his national squad for FIFA World Cup 2006, just like for Euro 2008 and FIFA World Cup 2010.

== Managerial career ==
In July 2020, Beşiktaş J.K. and Ernst announced that their cooperation to establish youth academies across continental Europe, focusing in Germany, Austria, and the Netherlands.

== Career statistics ==
=== Club ===
Appearances and goals by club, season and competition
Club	Season	League			Cup		Continental		Other		Total		Ref.
Club	Season	Division	Apps	Goals	Apps	Goals	Apps	Goals	Apps	Goals	Apps	Goals	Ref.
Hannover 96	1996–97	Regionalliga Nord	23	0	2	0	–		2 (Note: Two appearances and one goal in 2. Bundesliga promotion playoffs)	1	27	1	
Hannover 96	1997–98	Regionalliga Nord	31	1	3	0	–		2 (Note: Two appearances in 2. Bundesliga promotion playoffs)	0	36	1	
Hannover 96	Total		54	1	5	0	0	0	4	1	63	2	–
Hamburger SV	1998–99	Bundesliga	29	0	3	0	0	0	–		32	0	
Hamburger SV	1999–00	Bundesliga	19	0	1	0	0	0	–		20	0	
Hamburger SV	Total		48	0	4	0	0	0	0	0	52	0	–
Werder Bremen	2000–01	Bundesliga	28	2	2	0	6	1	0	0	36	3	
Werder Bremen	2001–02	Bundesliga	27	3	1	0	1	0	0	0	29	3	
Werder Bremen	2002–03	Bundesliga	31	2	5	0	4	0	1 (Note: One appearance in DFL-Ligapokal)	0	41	2	
Werder Bremen	2003–04	Bundesliga	33	2	6	0	3	0	0	0	42	2	
Werder Bremen	2004–05	Bundesliga	33	2	4	0	8	0	2 (Note: Two appearances in DFL-Ligapokal)	0	47	2	
Werder Bremen	Total		152	11	18	0	22	1	3	0	195	12	–
Schalke 04	2005–06	Bundesliga	32	0	0	0	12	1	2 (Note: Two appearances in DFL-Ligapokal)	0	46	1	
Schalke 04	2006–07	Bundesliga	26	0	1	0	1	0	0	0	28	0	
Schalke 04	2007–08	Bundesliga	33	1	3	0	9	0	3 (Note: Three appearances and one goal in DFL-Ligapokal)	1	48	2	
Schalke 04	2008–09	Bundesliga	15	0	3	0	6	0	0	0	24	0	
Schalke 04	Total		106	1	7	0	28	1	5	1	146	3	–
Beşiktaş	2008–09	Süper Lig	16	2	4	0	0	0	0	0	20	2	
Beşiktaş	2009–10	Süper Lig	28	1	3	0	5	0	1 (Note: Six appearances Turkish Super Cup)	0	37	1	
Beşiktaş	2010–11	Süper Lig	28	2	4	0	14	1	0	0	46	3	
Beşiktaş	2011–12	Süper Lig	27	2	0	0	10	0	6 (Note: Six appearances in Süper Lig championship playoffs)	0	43	2	
Beşiktaş	Total		99	7	11	0	29	1	7	0	146	8	–
Kasımpaşa	2012–13	Süper Lig	30	0	1	0	0	0	–		31	0	
Career total			489	20	46	0	79	3	19	2	633	25	–

=== International ===
Appearances and goals by national team and year
National team	Year	Apps	Goals
Germany	2002	2	0
Germany	2003	1	0
Germany	2004	10	1
Germany	2005	10	0
Germany	2006	1	0
Total		24	1

Scores and results list Germany's goal tally first, score column indicates score after Ernst goal.

International goal scored by Fabian Ernst
No.	Date	Venue	Opponent	Score	Result	Competition
1	9 October 2004	Azadi Stadium, Tehran, Iran	Iran	1–0	2–0	Friendly

== Honours ==
Werder Bremen

- Bundesliga: 2003–04
- DFB-Pokal: 2003–04

Schalke 04

- DFB-Ligapokal: 2005

Beşiktaş

- Süper Lig: 2008–09
- Turkish Cup; 2008–09; 2010–11

Individual

- 2008–09 Golden Team of the Year – Süper Lig
