= Frank Baumann (footballer) =

German footballer (born 1975)

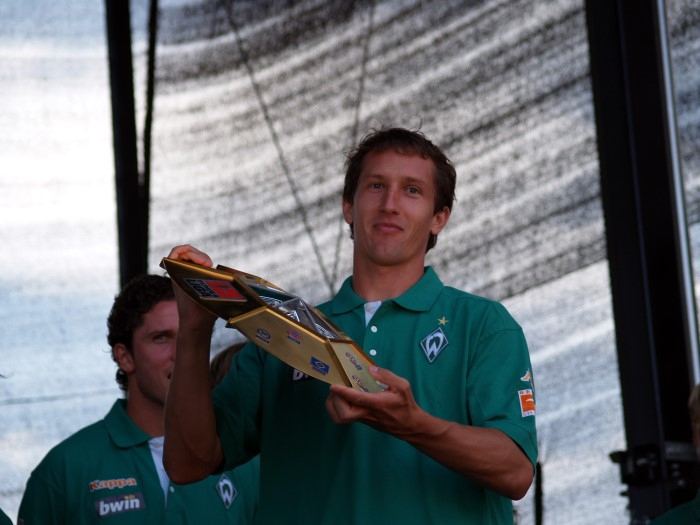
- Baumann lifts the DFB Liga-Pokal with Werder Bremen in 2006

Personal information
- Date of birth: 29 October 1975 (age 51)
- Place of birth: Würzburg, West Germany
- Height: 1.87 m (6 ft 2 in)
- Positions: Defensive midfielder; centre back

Youth career
- TSV Grombühl
- 1. FC Nürnberg

Senior career*
Years	Team	Apps	(Gls)
1994–1999	1. FC Nürnberg	130	(11)
1999–2009	Werder Bremen	260	(16)
Total		390	(27)

International career
1996–1998	Germany U21	17	(1)
1999–2005	Germany	28	(2)
Medal record
Representing Germany
Men's football
FIFA World Cup
Runner-up	2002 Korea/Japan
- * Club domestic league appearances and goals

Frank Baumann (born 29 October 1975) is a German former professional footballer, best known for his spell at SV Werder Bremen, and the current sporting director of Schalke 04.

Either a defensive midfielder or a centre-back, he was well known for his tough tackling and defensive positioning. A German international on nearly 30 occasions, he represented his country at one UEFA European Championship and one FIFA World Cup, reaching the 2002 final in the latter tournament.

== Club career ==
=== 1. FC Nürnberg ===
Born in Würzburg, Bavaria, Baumann began his career in his youth at TSV Grombühl. In 1991 he then switched to the youth team of 1. FC Nürnberg. Having started out as a midfielder, his talents were soon recognized in a defensive position. On 3 October 1994, he began his professional career at the club on the seventh game day of the 1994–95 2. Bundesliga in the starting line-up in the home game against SG Wattenscheid 09. That same season he played in four other games and by the beginning of the following season he developed into a regular player. He proved loyalty to the club when he accompanied them to the 1996–97 Regionalliga. There he was immediately promoted again and a year later moved up to the Bundesliga.

Baumann became a tragic figure in the season final of the 1998–99 Bundesliga season. Before the final game day, 1. FC Nürnberg thought that they would stay in the league. but then they were relegated. Baumann missed a big chance late in the game and the club was relegated. After amassing more than 150 overall appearances and having represented the club in all three major levels of German football, he moved in 1999 to Werder Bremen.

=== Werder Bremen ===
At Werder Bremen, Baumann was the first player to be signed by the new coach Thomas Schaaf and became an instant first choice, netting five goals in his first season; even though the club only finished ninth, it qualified for the UEFA Cup via the second place in the domestic cup, after losing the final to FC Bayern Munich. He became team captain in 2000, which he remained until the end of his career. Due to his calm demeanor and his clear style of play, he enjoyed a high reputation within the team. He was an important building block for the 2003–04 Bundesliga and the 2003–04 DFB-Pokal. In his last active years, he was repeatedly set back by injuries, especially to his Achilles tendon. He was only able to play 19 and 17 games in the Bundesliga in the 2005–06 and 2006–07 seasons. In the 2008–09 season Baumann continued to feature regularly for Werder, although he struggled with injuries in his later years. Baumann scored the goal that took Bremen to the 2009 UEFA Cup Final, in the second leg of the semifinal against Hamburger SV, from a corner conceded by after the ball had deflected off a crumpled up piece of paper thrown from the home supporters. He announced his retirement in May 2009 with his contract set to expire the following month.

On 16 December 2009, Baumann was named the seventh honorary captain of SV Werder Bremen.

== International career ==
Baumann featured in 28 internationals, scoring two goals. His debut for Germany came in a 1–0 victory against Norway in Oslo, on 14 November 1999, becoming the 800th player to be capped by the German national team. He scored his two goals as a national player in 2001 in friendlies against Slovakia and Hungary.

He was picked for the squads for the 2002 FIFA World Cup (appearing in the round-of-16 match against Paraguay) and UEFA Euro 2004 (two matches). At the UEFA Euro 2004 in Portugal, Baumann played in the first group game against the Netherlands and in the second group game against Latvia; the team was eliminated after the group stage. Baumann played his last game on 26 March 2005 against Slovenia.

== Managerial career ==
In May 2009, Baumann became Werder Bremen's assistant general manager, joining another former player, Klaus Allofs, in his staff. At the end of the 2014–15 season, he left his position as "director of first-team football and scouting" after 2 1/2 years. Following his career as a professional footballer, Baumann switched to SV Werder Bremen's management at the beginning of 2010 after taking a six-month "break". At the end of 2011 he also became head of the Scout (sport) department. In November 2012 he was promoted to director of professional football and scouting. In this position, created especially for him, he worked directly for the managing director of professional football Thomas Eichin. After the 2014–15 season, he resigned from the position.

On 19 May 2016, Baumann was announced as the new sporting director of Werder Bremen, replacing Thomas Eichin, who was removed from the club immediately due to differing views on future sporting development. On 27 May 2016, Baumann was announced as sporting director by the club at a press conference. The contract ran until 30 June 2019. In September 2018, his contract was extended for three years to 30 June 2021.

Baumann became the sporting director of 2. Bundesliga club Schalke 04 on 1 June 2025.

== Personal life ==
Baumann is a member of the Board of Trustees of the "Stiftung Jugendfußball" (Youth Football Foundation). The foundation was founded in 2000 by Jürgen Klinsmann, other successful national players and the lecturers of the football teacher special course.

Baumann is a trained social security clerk and sports specialist. He is married to Stefanie. They have a daughter, Louisa, and a son, Moritz.

== Career statistics ==
=== Club ===
Appearances and goals by club, season and competition
Club	Season	League			DFB-Pokal		Continental		Other		Total	
Club	Season	Division	Apps	Goals	Apps	Goals	Apps	Goals	Apps	Goals	Apps	Goals
1. FC Nürnberg	1994–95	2. Bundesliga	5	0	0	0	–		–		5	0
1. FC Nürnberg	1995–96	2. Bundesliga	31	5	3	0	–		–		34	5
1. FC Nürnberg	1996–97	Regionalliga Süd	32	5	2	0	–		–		34	5
1. FC Nürnberg	1997–98	2. Bundesliga	32	0	1	0	–		–		33	0
1. FC Nürnberg	1998–99	Bundesliga	30	1	2	0	–		–		32	1
1. FC Nürnberg	Total		130	11	8	0	0	0	0	0	138	11
Werder Bremen	1999–00	Bundesliga	32	5	5	0	10	1	2 (Note: Appearance(s) in DFL-Ligapokal)	0	49	6
Werder Bremen	2000–01	Bundesliga	30	2	1	0	5	1	0	0	36	3
Werder Bremen	2001–02	Bundesliga	34	1	2	0	0	0	0	0	36	1
Werder Bremen	2002–03	Bundesliga	24	0	4	0	3	1	1	0	32	1
Werder Bremen	2003–04	Bundesliga	32	2	6	0	4	0	0	0	42	2
Werder Bremen	2004–05	Bundesliga	22	1	2	0	6	0	2	0	32	1
Werder Bremen	2005–06	Bundesliga	19	2	4	0	1	0	2	0	26	2
Werder Bremen	2006–07	Bundesliga	17	1	1	0	6	1	1	0	25	2
Werder Bremen	2007–08	Bundesliga	23	1	2	0	9	0	1	0	35	1
Werder Bremen	2008–09	Bundesliga	27	1	4	0	8	1	0	0	39	2
Werder Bremen	Total		260	16	31	0	52	5	9	0	352	21
Career total			390	27	39	0	52	5	9	0	490	32

=== International ===
Appearances and goals by national team and year
National team	Year	Apps	Goals
Germany	1999	1	0
Germany	2000	2	0
Germany	2001	4	2
Germany	2002	6	0
Germany	2003	8	0
Germany	2004	6	0
Germany	2005	1	0
Total		28	2

Scores and results list Germany's goal tally first, score column indicates score after each Baumann goal.

List of international goals scored by Frank Baumann
No.	Date	Venue	Opponent	Score	Result	Competition
1	29 May 2001	Weserstadion, Bremen, Germany	Slovakia	2–0	2–0	Friendly
2	15 August 2001	Ferenc Puskás, Budapest, Hungary	Hungary	4–0	5–2	Friendly

== Honours ==
Werder Bremen

- Bundesliga: 2003–04
- DFB-Pokal: 2003–04, 2008–09; runner-up 1999–00
- DFB-Ligapokal: 2006; runner-up 1999, 2004
- UEFA Cup runner-up: 2008–09

Germany

- FIFA World Cup runner-up: 2002
