= Viktor Skrypnyk =

Ukrainian footballer (born 1969)

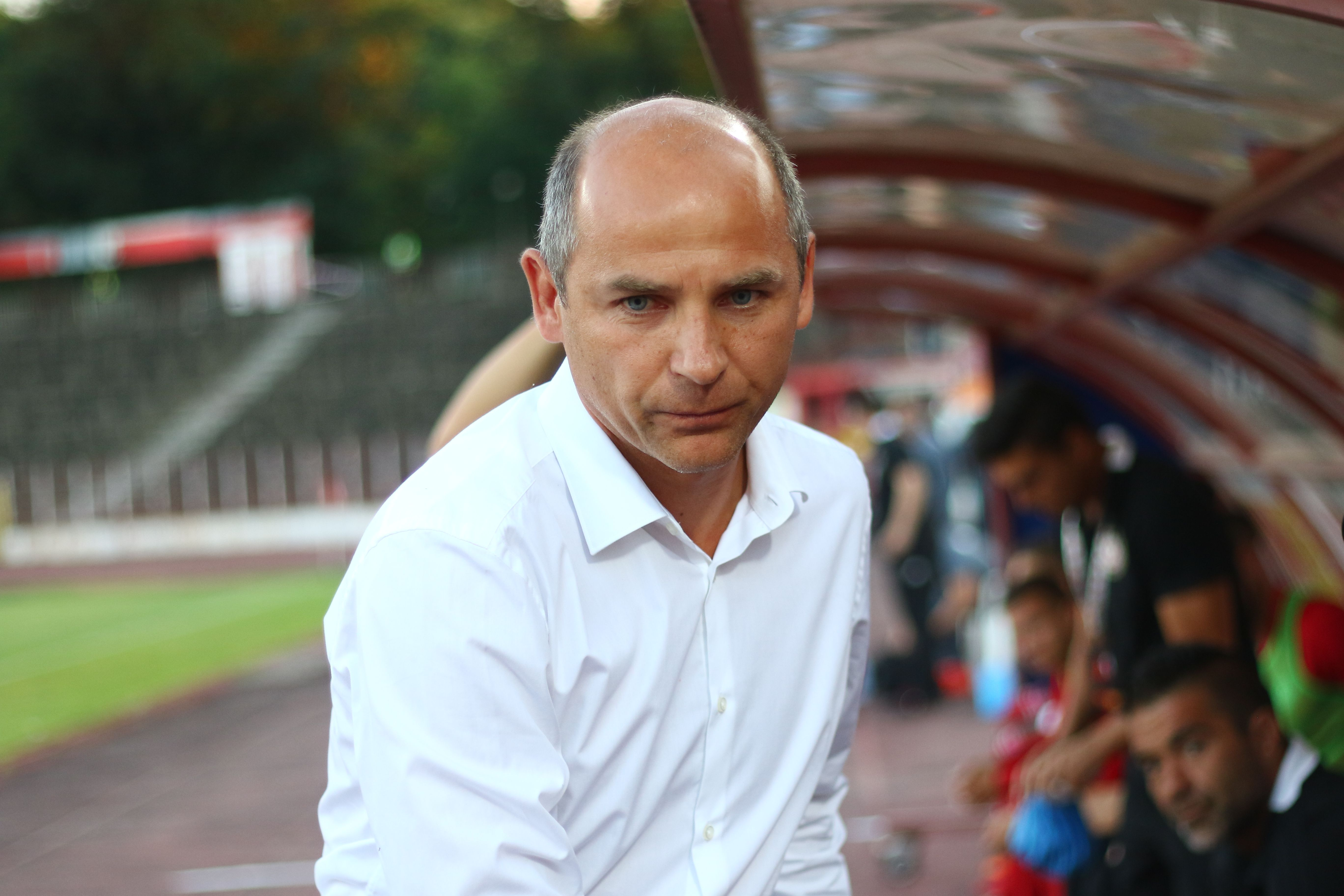
- Skrypnyk in 2018

Personal information
- Full name: Viktor Anatoliyovych Skrypnyk
- Date of birth: 19 November 1969 (age 56)
- Place of birth: Novomoskovsk, Ukrainian SSR, Soviet Union
- Height: 1.82 m (6 ft 0 in)
- Position: Left-back

Team information
- Current team: Zorya Luhansk (manager)

Youth career
- Dnipropetrovsk

Senior career*
Years	Team	Apps	(Gls)
1986–1989	Dnipro Dnipropetrovsk	0	(0)
1989–1994	Metalurh Zaporizhzhia	124	(7)
1994–1996	Dnipro Dnipropetrovsk	64	(17)
1996–2004	Werder Bremen	138	(7)
Total		326	(31)

International career
1991	USSR U-21	1	(0)
1994–2003	Ukraine	24	(2)

Managerial career
- 2013–2014: Werder Bremen II
- 2014–2016: Werder Bremen
- 2018–2019: Riga
- 2019–2022: Zorya Luhansk
- 2022–2023: Vorskla Poltava
- 2023–2024: Metalist 1925 Kharkiv
- 2025–: Zorya Luhansk
- * Club domestic league appearances and goals

Viktor Anatoliyovych Skrypnyk (Ukrainian: Віктор Анатолійович Скрипник; born 19 November 1969) is a Ukrainian professional football manager and former player who has been the manager of Ukrainian Premier League club Zorya Luhansk since 2025. As a player, he played as a left-back and he helped Werder Bremen to the league and cup double in 2004.

Skrypnyk became the first Ukrainian head coach in Bundesliga.

== Playing career ==
Before playing professionally, in 1987–88 Skrypnyk participated in the reserve competitions of the Soviet Top League for Dnipro Dnipropetrovsk playing some 46 games. In 1987 Skrypnyk also played one game for Dnipro in the Soviet Cup.

In 1989 Skrypnyk signed with the prime Zaporizhzhia club Metalurh that played at the Soviet First League (tier 2) and for which he started his professional career. His debut in the Soviet Top League (Vysshaya Liga), Skrypnyk made for FC Metalurh Zaporizhya (Metallurg) in 1991 along with the club's debut at the top level. He continued to play for the Zaporizhzhia team after dissolution of the Soviet Union when the Metalurh Zaporizhya was admitted to the Vyshcha Liha (Ukrainian Top League) in 1992–1994. In the mid-1990s Skrypnyk returned to his "home" club in Dnipro for couple of seasons. In 1995–1996 he played for FC Dnipro when it was coached by Bernd Stange who later recommended Skrypnyk to Werder that was coached by Hans-Jürgen Dörner. Around that time he was also called up to the Ukraine national football team for which Skrypnyk debuted in 1994. In 1996 he was sold for 1.5 million DM to the German side Werder Bremen with which he stayed for about 22 years (1996–2018). During the 1999–2000 season Skrypnyk was injured several times and even hospitalized - because of that he did not play neither for the club nor the national team. At the end of 2002–03 season Skrypnyk again sustained a major injury and recovered only by the winter intermission of the 2003–04. After the 2003–04 season aged at 34, he decided to retire.

== Coaching career ==
After retiring from playing career Skrypnyk stayed with Werder as a coach at the Werder's football academy. His coaching UEFA license "A" Skrypnyk received initially in Kyiv and supposedly it had to be good across whole Europe. But in Germany no one was acknowledging the license and he had to take the coaching courses again in Germany. At first it was the category "B" license which allowed Skrypnyk to train children. With time he received the top category license.

Skrypnyk became head coach of Werder Bremen II from 18 June 2013 until 25 October 2014 when he took over the first team of Werder Bremen. He finished with a record of 31 wins, seven draws, and nine losses for the reserve team. He made his debut against Chemnitzer FC in the DFB-Pokal on 28 October 2014. He was sacked on 18 September 2016 along with assistant coach Torsten Frings.

On 5 July 2018, he was appointed as the new manager of Latvian Higher League club Riga FC. On 5 February 2019 it was announced, that Skripnik had left the club.

On 10 June 2022 Skrypnyk was appointed as new manager of Vorskla Poltava. On 20 December 2023 he had left FC Vorskla and was appointed as new manager of Metalist 1925 Kharkiv. On 26 July 2024, Skrypnyk resigned from Metalist 1925.

On 16 June 2025, Skrypnyk was appointed as new manager of Zorya Luhansk.

== Career statistics ==
=== Club ===
Note, according to the FIFA, Russia is the only successor of the Soviet Union (Ukraine or any other Union republics are not considered to any degree).

Appearances and goals by club, season and competition
Club	Season	League			Cup		Continental		Other		Total		Ref.
Club	Season	Division	Apps	Goals	Apps	Goals	Apps	Goals	Apps	Goals	Apps	Goals	Ref.
Dnepr Dnepropetrovsk	1987	Soviet Top League	0	0	1	0	0	0	0	0	1	0	
Metallurg Zaporozhye	1989	Soviet First League	2	0	0	0	0	0	0	0	2	0	
Metallurg Zaporozhye	1990	Soviet First League	19	0	1	0	0	0	0	0	20	0	
Metallurg Zaporozhye	1991	Soviet Top League	25	0	0	0	0	0	0	0	25	0	
Metallurg Zaporozhye	1992	Vyshcha Liha	18	1	4	1	0	0	0	0	22	2	
Metallurg Zaporozhye	1992–93	Vyshcha Liha	28	2	5	0	0	0	0	0	33	2	
Metallurg Zaporozhye	1993–94	Vyshcha Liha	32	4	3	2	0	0	0	0	35	6	
Metallurg Zaporozhye	Total		124	7	13	3	0	0	0	0	137	10	–
Dnipro Dnipropetrovsk	1994–95	Vyshcha Liha	31	8	7	0	0	0	0	0	31	8	
Dnipro Dnipropetrovsk	1995–96	Vyshcha Liha	31	6	3	2	0	0	0	0	34	8	
Dnipro Dnipropetrovsk	1996–97	Vyshcha Liha	2	3	0	0	0	0	0	0	2	3	
Dnipro Dnipropetrovsk	Total		64	17	10	2	0	0	0	0	74	19	–
Werder Bremen	1996–97	Bundesliga	22	1	0	0	0	0	0	0	22	1	
Werder Bremen	1997–98	Bundesliga	23	0	1	0	0	0	0	0	24	0	
Werder Bremen	1998–99	Bundesliga	16	0	3	0	1	0	0	0	20	0	
Werder Bremen	1999–00	Bundesliga	5	0	1	0	0	0	0	0	6	0	
Werder Bremen	2000–01	Bundesliga	10	0	1	0	3	0	0	0	14	0	
Werder Bremen	2001–02	Bundesliga	31	4	2	0	1	0	0	0	34	4	
Werder Bremen	2002–03	Bundesliga	25	1	4	0	3	0	0	0	32	1	
Werder Bremen	2003–04	Bundesliga	6	1	1	0	0	0	0	0	7	1	
Werder Bremen	Total		138	7	13	0	8	0	0	0	159	7	–
Career total			326	31	13	0	8	0	0	0	347	31	–

=== International ===
Appearances and goals by national team and year
National team	Year	Apps	Goals
Ukraine	1994	3	0
Ukraine	1995	4	1
Ukraine	1996	5	1
Ukraine	1997	5	0
Ukraine	1998	0	0
Ukraine	1999	1	0
Ukraine	2000	0	0
Ukraine	2001	1	0
Ukraine	2002	4	0
Ukraine	2003	1	0
Total		24	2

List of international goals scored by Viktor Skrypnyk
No.	Date	Venue	Opponent	Score	Result	Competition
1	11 October 1995	Bežigrad Stadium, Ljubljana, Slovenia	Slovenia	1–0	2–3	UEFA Euro 1996 qualifying
2	13 August 1996	Olimpiyskiy NSC, Kyiv, Ukraine	Lithuania	2–1	5–2	Friendly

== Managerial statistics ==
As of match played 23 August 2022

Managerial record by team and tenure
Team	Nat	From	To	Record								Ref
Team	Nat	From	To	G	W	D	L	GF	GA	GD	Win %	Ref
Werder Bremen II	(Germany)	18 June 2013	25 October 2014	47	31	7	9	110	58	+52	65.96	
Werder Bremen	(Germany)	25 October 2014	18 September 2016	70	26	14	30	106	130	−24	37.14	
Riga	(Latvia)	5 July 2018	5 February 2019	20	15	4	1	34	10	+24	75.00	
Zorya Luhansk	(Ukraine)	3 June 2019	Present	104	55	20	29	166	112	+54	52.88	
Total				241	127	45	69	416	310	+106	52.70	—

== Honours ==
=== As player ===
Werder Bremen

- Bundesliga: 2003–04
- DFB-Pokal: 1998–99, 2003–04

=== As manager ===
Riga FC

- Latvian Higher League: 2018
- Latvian Football Cup: 2018

Zorya Luhansk

- Ukrainian Cup: Runner-Up 2020-21

=== Individual ===
- Best Coach of Ukrainian Premier League: 2019–20
- Ukrainian Premier League Manager of the Month: February 2021, September 2021, November 2021
