= Daniel Jensen =

Danish footballer (born 1979)

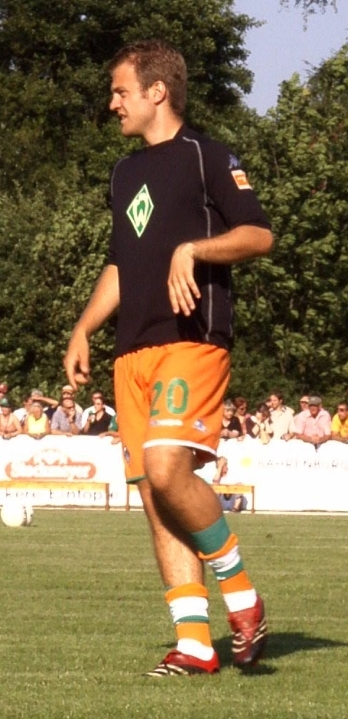
- Jensen with Werder Bremen

Personal information
- Full name: Daniel Monberg Jensen
- Date of birth: 25 June 1979 (age 47)
- Place of birth: Copenhagen, Denmark
- Height: 1.79 m (5 ft 10 in)
- Position: Central midfielder

Senior career*
| Years | Team | Apps | (Gls) |
| 1996–1998 | B.93 | 44 | (9) |
| 1998–2003 | Heerenveen | 123 | (16) |
| 2003–2004 | Murcia | 28 | (0) |
| 2004–2011 | Werder Bremen | 133 | (7) |
| 2012 | Novara | 6 | (0) |
| 2013 | Copenhagen | 10 | (0) |
| 2013–2015 | SønderjyskE | 48 | (3) |
| 2015–2016 | Lyngby BK | 9 | (0) |
| Total | | 401 | (35) |

International career
| 1995–1997 | Denmark U19 | 16 | (3) |
| 1999–2002 | Denmark U21 | 19 | (2) |
| 2002–2010 | Denmark | 52 | (3) |
- * Club domestic league appearances and goals

Daniel Monberg Jensen (born 25 June 1979) is a Danish former professional footballer. A central midfielder, he was known for making good passes in the final third of the field. He played more than 50 matches and scored three goals for the Denmark national team, and represented his country at the 2004 European Championship. He is the younger brother of a retired former Denmark international player Niclas Jensen.

== Club career ==
=== Early career ===
Born in Copenhagen, Daniel Jensen started playing football at B93 in the secondary Danish 1st Division. In his time at the club he made 44 appearances scoring 9 goals. He was called up for Danish under-19 national team in September 1995, and made his senior debut for Boldklubben in the fall 1996. He played a total 16 matches and scored three goals for the under-19 national team, before he was sold to Dutch club Heerenveen in July 1998.

=== Heerenveen ===
While at Heerenveen, he played 19 games and scored two goals for the Danish under-21 national team. In February 2002, he made his Danish national team debut under national coach Morten Olsen.

After more than 100 league matches for Heerenveen, his contract ran out in the summer 2003, and he left the club on a free transfer.

=== Murcia ===
Jensen sought a move to a club in the La Liga championship, and signed a one-year contract with newly promoted team Real Murcia in August 2003. Murcia ended last in the 2003–04 La Liga season, and Jensen was reported on his way to a number of German clubs. He was called up to the Danish team for the 2004 European Championship (Euro 2004) in June 2004. He began the Euro 2004 tournament as a part of the Danish starting line-up, and played full-time in the first two matches against Italy and Bulgaria. He was replaced by Christian Poulsen during Denmark's third match, and saw the quarter-final defeat to the Czech Republic from the bench. Back from Euro 2004, Murcia used a clause in Jensen's contract to prolong it for another two years. The extension hindered Jensen from leaving the club on a free transfer, and he was sold to German club Werder Bremen for €1 million in July 2004.

=== Werder Bremen ===
In August 2006, he was a part of the German League Cup winning Werder Bremen team. In January 2008, Jensen signed an extension to his contract with Werder Bremen, that would keep him at the club until 2011.

On 11 May 2011, Jensen was released from his contract a month early due to comments made about the coaching staff after being left out of the squad against Borussia Dortmund. "There was a discussion between him and coach Thomas Schaaf this morning and he has been released with immediate effect," sports director Klaus Allofs said in a statement, "He does not play any role in our planning any more."

=== Later career ===
In December 2011, he joined Italian Serie A club Novara on trial, in an attempt to get a new contract. In January 2012, Jensen signed a contract with Novara that kept him at the club until 2013.

== Personal life ==
Jensen's older brother Niclas was also a professional footballer. Like Daniel, Niclas also represented Denmark at international level and played in the Bundesliga.

== Career statistics ==
=== Club ===
Appearances and goals by club, season and competition
| Club | Season | League | | | National cup | | Continental | | Other | | Total | |
| Club | Season | Division | Apps | Goals | Apps | Goals | Apps | Goals | Apps | Goals | Apps | Goals |
|---|---|---|---|---|---|---|---|---|---|---|---|---|
| Heerenveen | 1998–99 | Eredivisie | 1 | 0 | | | 0 | 0 | | | 1 | 0 |
| Heerenveen | 1999–2000 | Eredivisie | 29 | 4 | | | 1 | 0 | | | 30 | 4 |
| Heerenveen | 2000–01 | Eredivisie | 30 | 3 | | | 6 | 1 | | | 36 | 4 |
| Heerenveen | 2001–02 | Eredivisie | 31 | 5 | | | 3 | 1 | | | 34 | 6 |
| Heerenveen | 2002–03 | Eredivisie | 32 | 4 | | | 2 | 0 | | | 34 | 4 |
| Heerenveen | Total | | 123 | 16 | 0 | 0 | 12 | 2 | 0 | 0 | 135 | 18 |
| Real Murcia | 2003–04 | Primera División | 28 | 0 | 1 | 0 | – | | 0 | 0 | 29 | 0 |
| Werder Bremen | 2004–05 | Bundesliga | 21 | 0 | 3 | 2 | 4 | 1 | 0 | 0 | 28 | 3 |
| Werder Bremen | 2005–06 | Bundesliga | 27 | 1 | 3 | 1 | 3 | 0 | 0 | 0 | 33 | 2 |
| Werder Bremen | 2006–07 | Bundesliga | 23 | 4 | 1 | 0 | 7 | 0 | 1 (Note: Appearances in DFL-Ligapokal) | 0 | 32 | 4 |
| Werder Bremen | 2007–08 | Bundesliga | 27 | 2 | 2 | 0 | 12 | 1 | 0 | 0 | 41 | 3 |
| Werder Bremen | 2008–09 | Bundesliga | 11 | 0 | 2 | 0 | 6 | 0 | – | | 19 | 0 |
| Werder Bremen | 2009–10 | Bundesliga | 13 | 0 | 1 | 0 | 5 | 0 | – | | 19 | 0 |
| Werder Bremen | 2010–11 | Bundesliga | 11 | 0 | 1 | 0 | 3 | 0 | – | | 15 | 0 |
| Werder Bremen | Total | | 133 | 7 | 13 | 3 | 40 | 2 | 1 | 0 | 187 | 12 |
| Novara | 2011–12 | Serie A | 6 | 0 | 1 | 0 | – | | – | | 7 | 0 |
| Novara | 2012–13 | Serie A | 0 | 0 | 2 | 0 | – | | – | | 2 | 0 |
| Novara | Total | | 6 | 0 | 3 | 0 | 0 | 0 | 0 | 0 | 9 | 0 |
| Copenhagen | 2012–13 | Danish Superliga | 10 | 0 | 0 | 0 | 0 | 0 | – | | 10 | 0 |
| SønderjyskE | 2013–14 | Danish Superliga | 23 | 3 | 3 | 0 | – | | – | | 26 | 3 |
| SønderjyskE | 2014–15 | Danish Superliga | 25 | 0 | 0 | 0 | – | | – | | 25 | 0 |
| SønderjyskE | Total | | 48 | 3 | 3 | 0 | 0 | 0 | 0 | 0 | 51 | 3 |
| Lyngby | 2015–16 | Danish 1st Division | 9 | 0 | 1 | 0 | – | | – | | 10 | 0 |
| Career total | | | 357 | 26 | 21 | 3 | 52 | 4 | 1 | 0 | 431 | 33 |

=== International ===
Scores and results list Denmark's goal tally first, score column indicates score after each Jensen goal.

List of international goals scored by Daniel Jensen
| No. | Date | Venue | Opponent | Score | Result | Competition |
|---|---|---|---|---|---|---|
| 1 | 11 October 2006 | Rheinpark Stadion, Vaduz, Liechtenstein | Liechtenstein | 1–0 | 4–0 | Euro 2008 qualification |
| 2 | 6 February 2007 | Loftus Road, London, England | Australia | 2–0 | 3–1 | Friendly |
| 3 | 10 September 2008 | Estádio José Alvalade, Lisbon, Portugal | Portugal | 3–2 | 3–2 | FIFA World Cup 2010 qualifying |

== Honours ==
Werder Bremen

- DFB-Ligapokal: 2006
- DFB-Pokal: 2008–09

Copenhagen

- Danish Superliga: 2012–13
