= Dieter Eilts =

German footballer (born 1964)

Personal information
- Date of birth: 13 December 1964 (age 61)
- Place of birth: Upgant-Schott, West Germany
- Height: 1.86 m (6 ft 1 in)
- Position: Defensive midfielder

Youth career
- SV Hage
- Werder Bremen

Senior career*
Years	Team	Apps	(Gls)
1984–1988	Werder Bremen II	132	(36)
1985–2002	Werder Bremen	390	(7)
Total		522	(43)

International career
1993–1997	Germany	31	(0)

Managerial career
- 2002–2003: Werder Bremen U19
- 2003–2004: Germany U19
- 2004–2008: Germany U21
- 2006–2007: Germany U20
- 2008–2009: Hansa Rostock
Medal record
Men's football
Representing Germany
UEFA European Championship
Winner	1996 England
- * Club domestic league appearances and goals

Dieter Eilts (born 13 December 1964) is a German former professional footballer who played as a defensive midfielder. After retiring as a player, he began a managerial career and also worked for SV Werder Bremen as director of the football academy.

== Playing career ==
Born in Upgant-Schott, East Frisia, Eilts had the reputation of being the quintessential midfield blue-collar worker. He played 390 matches in the Bundesliga for SV Werder Bremen, his only club during his whole professional career, and scored seven goals. He was also lauded as one of the most responsible and sensible players of the league, never appearing in the yellow press and always leading by example. Eilts is regarded as one of the finest discoveries of legendary coach Otto Rehhagel.

Eilts also was a regular with the German squad, collecting 31 caps. His finest games came in the 1996 European Championship, when he, Matthias Sammer and Thomas Helmer formed the defensive backbone of the team that won the trophy.

Eilts went to EURO '96 with the reputation of an outstanding club servant with Werder Bremen under future competition hero Otto Rehhagel, but at international level he was relatively inexperienced and had never previously participated in a major tournament. There were doubts in the German media over the wisdom of handing him the midfield anchorman role in England, but the wiry East Frisian surprised everybody with the class and composure of his play. It was his tactical appreciation and willingness to drop back into defence that enabled sweeper Matthias Sammer to make many dangerous sorties into enemy territory as his team let in just three goals, one of which came in the final after Eilts had been forced off due to injury. He closed his international career in 1997 with 31 caps, six of those coming in England, but captained Bremen until 2002, clocking up 390 Bundesliga appearances over a 17-year period. He won two German championships, three German Cups and, in 1992, the UEFA European Cup Winners' Cup. Since retirement he has coached the Germany Under-19 and U21 squads.

== After retiring ==
After his player career, Eilts trained the German U19 squad, and from 6 August 2004, he was the coach of the German U21 squad. Latterly, he coached German second league team Hansa Rostock, but was released from his contract on 6 March 2009 after poor league results.

In 2009, Eilts was appointed as youth manager for VfL Oldenburg. In January 2011, he got a new role as youth-coordinator in the club.

Eilts got on 27 January 2012 the job as Director of football academy at SV Werder Bremen.

== Nickname ==
Eilts' nickname was Ostfriesen-Alemão (the Alemão of East Frisia). It was coined by his then-manager Otto Rehhagel in a press conference ahead of a Werder Bremen match against S.S.C. Napoli in the UEFA Cup in reference to Napoli's Brazilian star midfielder Alemão.

He was also called Eisen-Dieter (Iron-Dieter) for his tough playing style.

== Career statistics ==
=== Club ===
Appearances and goals by club, season and competition
Club	Season	League			Cup		Continental		Other		Total		Ref.
Club	Season	Division	Apps	Goals	Apps	Goals	Apps	Goals	Apps	Goals	Apps	Goals	Ref.
Werder Bremen II	1984–85	Oberliga Nord	34	5	0	0	–		–		34	5	
Werder Bremen II	1985–86	Oberliga Nord	34	13	0	0	–		–		34	13	
Werder Bremen II	1986–87	Oberliga Nord	30	11	2	1	–		–		32	12	
Werder Bremen II	1987–88	Oberliga Nord	34	7	0	0	–		–		34	7	
Werder Bremen II	Total		132	36	2	1	0	0	0	0	134	37	–
Werder Bremen	1986–87	Bundesliga	1	0	0	0	0	0	0	0	1	0	
Werder Bremen	1987–88	Bundesliga	2	0	2	1	0	0	0	0	4	1	
Werder Bremen	1988–89	Bundesliga	13	0	3	1	0	0	0	0	16	1	
Werder Bremen	1989–90	Bundesliga	31	1	6	1	9	2	0	0	46	4	
Werder Bremen	1990–91	Bundesliga	32	0	6	1	0	0	0	0	38	1	
Werder Bremen	1991–92	Bundesliga	37	1	5	0	7	1	2 (Note: Two appearances in DFL-Supercup)	0	51	2	
Werder Bremen	1992–93	Bundesliga	24	1	5	0	4	0	2 (Note: Two appearances in UEFA Super Cup)	0	35	1	
Werder Bremen	1993–94	Bundesliga	26	1	5	0	7	0	1 (Note: One appearance in DFL-Supercup)	0	39	1	
Werder Bremen	1994–95	Bundesliga	34	1	1	0	4	0	1 (Note: One appearance in DFL-Supercup)	0	40	1	
Werder Bremen	1995–96	Bundesliga	32	0	3	0	5	0	0	0	40	0	
Werder Bremen	1996–97	Bundesliga	30	0	2	0	0	0	0	0	32	0	
Werder Bremen	1997–98	Bundesliga	33	1	1	0	0	0	0	0	34	1	
Werder Bremen	1998–99	Bundesliga	32	0	6	0	4	1	0	0	42	1	
Werder Bremen	1999–00	Bundesliga	29	1	4	0	9	0	2 (Note: Two appearances in DFL-Ligapokal)	0	44	1	
Werder Bremen	2000–01	Bundesliga	30	0	2	0	5	0	0	0	37	0	
Werder Bremen	2001–02	Bundesliga	4	0	1	0	1	0	0	0	6	0	
Werder Bremen	Total		390	7	52	4	55	4	8	0	505	15	–
Career total			522	43	44	12	55	4	8	0	629	59	–

=== International ===
Appearances and goals by national team and year
National team	Year	Apps	Goals
Germany	1993	2	0
Germany	1994	3	0
Germany	1995	7	0
Germany	1996	15	0
Germany	1997	4	0
Total		31	0

== Honours ==
Werder Bremen

- Bundesliga: 1987–88, 1992–93
- DFB-Pokal: 1990–91, 1993–94, 1998–99
- European Cup Winners' Cup: 1991–92
- UEFA Intertoto Cup: 1998
- DFL-Supercup: 1993, 1994

Germany

- UEFA European Championship: 1996

Individual

- UEFA European Championship Team of the Tournament: 1996
