= Robert Paul (footballer) =

German footballer

Personal information
- Date of birth: 17 October 1984 (age 42)
- Place of birth: Sömmerda, Bezirk Erfurt, East Germany
- Height: 1.84 m (6 ft 0 in)
- Position: Left-back

Youth career
- 1990–1998: FSV Sömmerda
- 1998–2003: Carl Zeiss Jena

Senior career*
Years	Team	Apps	(Gls)
2002–2003	Carl Zeiss Jena	3	(0)
2003–2004	Werder Bremen II	44	(2)
2005–2006	Wacker Burghausen	16	(1)
2006	Carl Zeiss Jena II	13	(2)
2007–2008	Wehen Wiesbaden	13	(0)
2008–2010	SV Elversberg	57	(1)
2010–2011	SV Babelsberg 03	28	(1)
2011–2017	FSV Zwickau	156	(9)
2017–2018	VFC Plauen	13	(1)
2018–2020	Wismut Gera	44	(4)
Total		387	(21)
- * Club domestic league appearances and goals

Robert Paul (born 17 October 1984) is a German former professional footballer who played as a left-back.
