= Christian Schulz =

German footballer (born 1983)

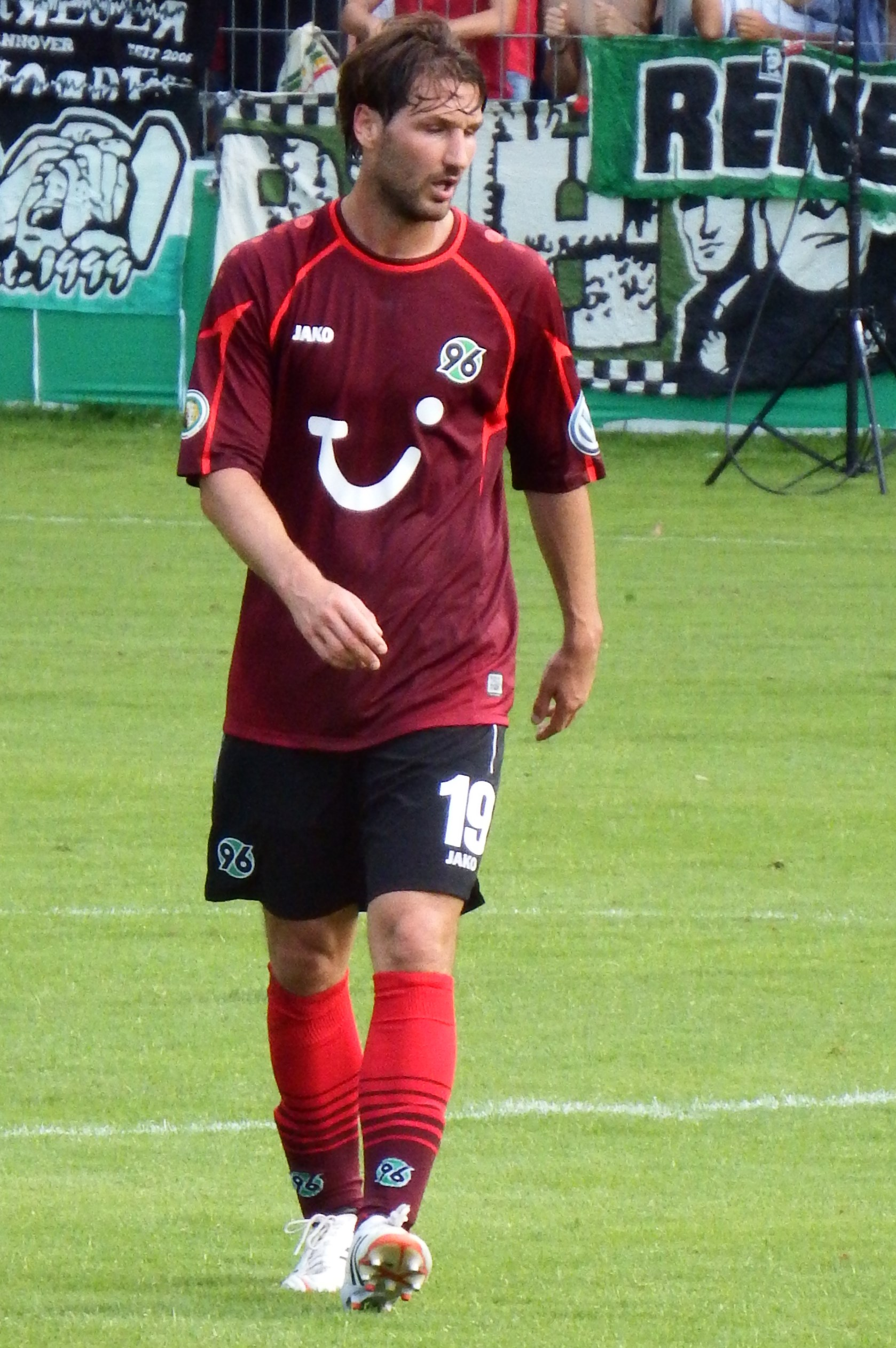
- Schulz playing for Hannover in 2013

Personal information
- Date of birth: 1 April 1983 (age 43)
- Place of birth: Bassum, West Germany
- Height: 1.85 m (6 ft 1 in)
- Positions: Centre-back; left-back

Youth career
- 1989–1995: TSV Bassum
- 1995–2001: Werder Bremen

Senior career*
Years	Team	Apps	(Gls)
2001–2005	Werder Bremen II	43	(3)
2002–2007	Werder Bremen	103	(4)
2007–2016	Hannover 96	255	(19)
2016–2018	Sturm Graz	44	(3)
2019–2021	Hannover 96 II	43	(3)
Total		488	(32)

International career
2004–2010	Germany	4	(0)

Managerial career
- 2025: Hannover 96 (interim)
- * Club domestic league appearances and goals

Christian Schulz (born 1 April 1983) is a German former professional footballer and current manager who played as a centre-back or left-back.

== Club career ==
Schulz joined Werder Bremen in 1995 at the age of twelve and stepped up to the reserve side, playing in the Regionalliga Nord in 2001–02. He made his Bundesliga debut on 15 February 2003 as a substitute against 1. FC Nürnberg. When Ümit Davala was injured, Schulz stepped in and made the left-back position his own. With Bremen he won the 2004 German football championship.

Although he had previously stated that he did not want to leave Bremen, he moved to Hannover 96 on 30 August 2007. After nine years with Hannover, he joined SK Sturm Graz. With Graz he won the 2017–18 Austrian Cup.

Schulz retired at the end of the 2020–21 season. Overall he played more than 400 matches in the German and Austrian top-flight respectively.

== International career ==
Schulz earned four caps for the Germany national team, making his international debut on 16 December 2004 in a 3–0 friendly win over Japan. He was part of the DFB squad of the 2005 FIFA Confederations Cup on home soil but didn't take part in the tournament because of an injury.

== Managerial career ==
Ahead of the 2023–24 season, Schulz was hired to coach the under-17 team of Hannover 96. On 23 April 2025, he was named interim coach for the club's first team together with Lars Barlemann and Dirk Lottner until the end of the 2024–25 season.

== Career statistics ==
=== Club ===
Appearances and goals by club, season and competition
Club	Season	League			Cup (Note: Includes German Cup and Austrian Cup)		Continental (Note: Includes UEFA Champions League and UEFA Europa League.)		Other (Note: Includes German League Cup.)		Total		Ref.
Club	Season	Division	Apps	Goals	Apps	Goals	Apps	Goals	Apps	Goals	Apps	Goals	Ref.
Werder Bremen II	2001–02	Regionalliga Nord	19	2	2	1	—		—		21	3	
Werder Bremen II	2002–03	Regionalliga Nord	13	0	1	0	—		—		14	0	
Werder Bremen II	2003–04	Regionalliga Nord	7	0	—		—		—		7	0	
Werder Bremen II	2004–05	Regionalliga Nord	4	1	—		—		—		4	1	
Werder Bremen II	Total		43	3	3	1	0	0	0	0	46	4	—
Werder Bremen	2002–03	Bundesliga	11	0	1	0	0	0	0	0	12	0	
Werder Bremen	2003–04	Bundesliga	17	0	3	0	0 (Note: Werder Bremen qualified for the UEFA Intertoto Cup. However, Schulz did not appear in any matches.)	0	—		20	0	
Werder Bremen	2004–05	Bundesliga	23	2	1	0	3	0	0	0	27	2	
Werder Bremen	2005–06	Bundesliga	30	0	2	0	10	1	2	0	44	1	
Werder Bremen	2006–07	Bundesliga	19	2	1	0	8	0	2	0	30	2	
Werder Bremen	2007–08	Bundesliga	3	0	1	0	2	0	1	0	7	0	
Werder Bremen	Total		103	4	9	0	23	1	5	0	140	5	—
Hannover 96	2007–08	Bundesliga	29	4	1	0	—		—		30	4	
Hannover 96	2008–09	Bundesliga	31	3	1	0	—		—		32	3	
Hannover 96	2009–10	Bundesliga	33	2	1	0	—		—		34	2	
Hannover 96	2010–11	Bundesliga	33	4	1	0	—		—		34	4	
Hannover 96	2011–12	Bundesliga	27	1	2	0	10	0	—		39	1	
Hannover 96	2012–13	Bundesliga	19	1	1	0	8	0	—		28	1	
Hannover 96	2013–14	Bundesliga	27	1	1	0	—		—		28	1	
Hannover 96	2014–15	Bundesliga	31	1	2	0	—		—		33	1	
Hannover 96	2015–16	Bundesliga	25	2	2	0	—		—		27	0	
Hannover 96	Total		255	19	12	0	18	0	0	0	285	19	—
Sturm Graz	2016–17	Austrian Bundesliga	30	3	0	0	—		—		30	3	
Sturm Graz	2017–18	Austrian Bundesliga	14	0	5	0	1	0	—		20	0	
Sturm Graz	Total		44	3	5	0	1	0	0	0	50	3	—
Hannover 96 II	2018–19	Regionalliga Nord	28	1	–		—		—		28	1	
Hannover 96 II	2019–20	Regionalliga Nord	11	2	–		–		—		11	2	
Hannover 96 II	2020–21	Regionalliga Nord	4	0	–		–		—		4	0	
Hannover 96 II	Total		43	3	0	0	0	0	0	0	43	3	–
Career total			488	32	29	1	42	1	5	0	564	34	—

=== International ===
Appearances and goals by national team and year
National team	Year	Apps	Goals
Germany	2004	2	0
Germany	2005	1	0
Germany	2010	1	0
Total		4	0

== Honours ==
Werder Bremen

- Bundesliga: 2003–04, runner-up 2005–06
- DFB-Pokal: 2003–04
- DFB-Ligapokal: 2006, runner-up 2004

Sturm Graz

- Austrian Cup: 2017–18
