= Razundara Tjikuzu =

Namibian former professional footballer (born 1979)

Personal information
- Date of birth: 12 December 1979 (age 46)
- Place of birth: Swakopmund, South West Africa
- Height: 1.75 m (5 ft 9 in)
- Positions: Defensive midfielder; right-back

Youth career
- 1995–1998: Werder Bremen

Senior career*
Years	Team	Apps	(Gls)
1998–2003	Werder Bremen II	39	(14)
1999–2003	Werder Bremen	68	(0)
2003–2005	Hansa Rostock	49	(5)
2005–2006	MSV Duisburg	23	(0)
2006–2007	Çaykur Rizespor	16	(1)
2007–2009	İstanbul BB	54	(1)
2009–2010	Trabzonspor	4	(0)
2010	Diyarbakırspor	10	(0)
2010–2011	Kasımpaşa	19	(1)
Total		282	(22)

International career
	Namibia	56	(12)
Medal record
Men's football
Representing Namibia
COSAFA Cup
Runner-up	1999 Southern Africa
- * Club domestic league appearances and goals

Razundara Tjikuzu (born 12 December 1979) is a Namibian former professional footballer who spent most of his career playing in Germany and Turkey and who represented Namibia at international level.

== Career ==
=== In Germany ===
Born in Swakopmund, South West Africa, Tjikuzu moved to Germany as a 14-year-old in 1995, joining SV Werder Bremen. At Werder Bremen, he rose through the youth ranks spending four years in the club's academy before being promoted to the reserves in 1998 and playing in the Regionalliga Nord, Germany's third tier at the time.

On 14 August 1999, Tjikuzu made his debut for the first team in the Bundesliga at the age of 19. He went on to make made 25 league appearances in his first season. In 2003, after eight years at Werder Bremen and having made 86 appearances in all competitions for the club, he was told to search for a new club.

In 2003, Tijkuzu moved to Bundesliga rivals Hansa Rostock. Following a strong first season, he signed with Hamburger SV, but after a drunken car crash and missing training, he was instantly dismissed by Rostock and his contract with Hamburger SV was also rescinded.

He spent the 2005–2006 Bundesliga season at MSV Duisburg who were relegated.

=== In Turkey ===
In summer 2006, Tjikuzu moved to Turkish side Çaykur Rizespor. A year later, he left Çaykur Rizespor for the newly promoted Süper Lig side İstanbul Büyükşehir Belediyespor where he started playing as a defensive midfielder. In summer 2009, he signed with Trabzonspor. On 11 January 2010, after just half a season in Trabzon, he joined Diyarbakırspor on loan for the rest of the season with whom he suffered relegation. In summer 2010, he moved to Kasımpaşa S.K. signing a two-year contract. After making 23 appearances in another season which ended with relegation, he was released from his contract.

== International career ==
Tjikuzu had previously made over 55 appearances for Namibia but was not in their squad for the 2008 African Cup of Nations.

== Career statistics ==
=== Club ===
Appearances and goals by club, season and competition
Club	Season	League			Cup (Note: Includes DFB-Pokal, DFL-Ligapokal, Turkish Cup)		Europe (Note: Includes UEFA Cup / Europa League)		Total	
Club	Season	Division	Apps	Goals	Apps	Goals	Apps	Goals	Apps	Goals
Werder Bremen II	1998–99	Regionalliga Nord	27	6	1	0	—		28	6
Werder Bremen II	2001–02	Regionalliga Nord	3	2	—		—		3	2
Werder Bremen II	2002–03	Regionalliga Nord	9	6	—		—		9	6
Werder Bremen II	Total		39	14	1	0	0	0	40	14
Werder Bremen	1999–2000	Bundesliga	25	0	4	0	5	0	34	0
Werder Bremen	2000–01	Bundesliga	13	0	—		1	0	14	0
Werder Bremen	2001–02	Bundesliga	22	0	1	1	—		23	1
Werder Bremen	2002–03	Bundesliga	8	0	2	0	—		10	0
Werder Bremen	Total		68	0	7	1	6	0	81	1
Hansa Rostock	2003–04	Bundesliga	34	4	2	0	—		36	4
Hansa Rostock	2004–05	Bundesliga	15	1	3	1	—		18	2
Hansa Rostock	Total		49	5	5	1	0	0	54	6
MSV Duisburg	2005–06	Bundesliga	23	0	1	0	—		24	0
Çaykur Rizespor	2006–07	Süper Lig	16	1	—		—		16	1
İstanbul BB	2007–08	Süper Lig	29	0	—		—		29	0
İstanbul BB	2008–09	Süper Lig	25	1	—		—		25	1
İstanbul BB	Total		54	1	0	0	0	0	54	1
Trabzonspor	2009–10	Süper Lig	4	0	—		2	0	6	0
Diyarbakırspor (loan)	2009–10	Süper Lig	10	0	—		—		10	0
Kasımpaşa	2010–11	Süper Lig	19	1	4	0	—		23	1
Career total			282	22	18	2	8	0	308	24

=== International goals ===
Scores and results list Namibia's goal tally first, score column indicates score after each Tjikuzu goal.

List of international goals scored by Razundara Tjikuzu
No.	Date	Venue	Opponent	Score	Result	Competition
1	12 September 1998	Independence Stadium, Windhoek, Namibia	Mozambique	1–1	2–1	1998 COSAFA Cup
2	22 April 2000	Independence Stadium, Windhoek, Namibia	Seychelles	1–0	3–0	2002 FIFA World Cup qualification
3	22 April 2000	Independence Stadium, Windhoek, Namibia	Seychelles	2–0	3–0	2002 FIFA World Cup qualification
4	22 April 2000	Independence Stadium, Windhoek, Namibia	Seychelles	3–0	3–0	2002 FIFA World Cup qualification
5	15 July 2000	Independence Stadium, Windhoek, Namibia	Benin	4–2	8–2	2002 African Cup of Nations qualification
6	15 July 2000	Independence Stadium, Windhoek, Namibia	Benin	7–2	8–2	2002 African Cup of Nations qualification
7	24 February 2001	Independence Stadium, Windhoek, Namibia	Egypt	1–0	1–1	2002 FIFA World Cup qualification

== Honours ==
Namibia

- COSAFA Cup runner-up: 1999
