= Markus Daun =

German footballer

Personal information
- Date of birth: 10 September 1980 (age 46)
- Place of birth: Eschweiler, West Germany
- Height: 1.85 m (6 ft 1 in)
- Position: Forward

Team information
- Current team: 1. FC Köln (youth)

Youth career
- –1995: Germania Dürwiß
- 1995–2001: Bayer Leverkusen

Senior career*
Years	Team	Apps	(Gls)
2000–2001	Bayer Leverkusen	3	(0)
2000–2001	Bayer Leverkusen II	20	(11)
2002	Alemannia Aachen	15	(4)
2002–2004	Werder Bremen	33	(3)
2004–2006	1. FC Nürnberg	33	(1)
2006–2008	MSV Duisburg	45	(9)
2008–2011	Alemannia Aachen	21	(2)
2008–2011	Alemannia Aachen II	3	(3)
Total		173	(33)

International career
2000–2001	Germany U21	6	(3)
2002–2004	Germany B	5	(1)

Managerial career
- 2011–2012: Alemannia Aachen U16
- 2012: Alemannia Aachen II (interim manager)
- 2012–2013: Alemannia Aachen U16 (trainer)
- 2013–: 1. FC Köln (youth)
- * Club domestic league appearances and goals

Markus Daun (born 10 September 1980) is a German former professional footballer who played as a striker, spending seven seasons in the Bundesliga with Bayer 04 Leverkusen, SV Werder Bremen, 1. FC Nürnberg and MSV Duisburg. He finished his career playing for Alemannia Aachen.

== Honours ==
Werder Bremen

- Bundesliga: 2003–04
- DFB-Pokal: 2003–04
