= Johan Micoud =

French footballer (born 1973)

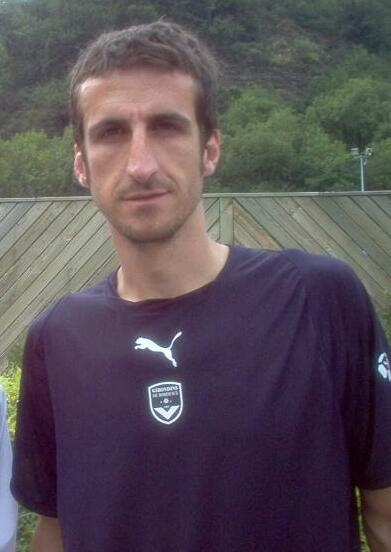
- Micoud with Bordeaux in 2006

Personal information
- Full name: Johan Cédric Micoud
- Date of birth: 24 July 1973 (age 53)
- Place of birth: Cannes, Alpes-Maritimes, France
- Height: 1.85 m (6 ft 1 in)
- Position: Attacking midfielder

Senior career*
Years	Team	Apps	(Gls)
1992–1996	Cannes	127	(17)
1996–2000	Bordeaux	127	(27)
2000–2002	Parma	47	(9)
2002–2006	Werder Bremen	123	(31)
2006–2008	Bordeaux	61	(10)
Total		485	(94)

International career
1999–2004	France	17	(1)
Medal record
Men's football
Representing France
UEFA European Championship
Winner	2000
- * Club domestic league appearances and goals

Johan Cédric Micoud (born 24 July 1973) is a French former professional footballer who played as an attacking midfielder.

He was considered a skilled midfielder and a dead-ball expert. During a 16-year career he played professionally in France, Italy and Germany.

Micoud gained 17 caps for France, and represented the nation at Euro 2000 and the 2002 FIFA World Cup, winning the former tournament.

== Club career ==
=== Cannes ===
Born in Cannes, Alpes-Maritimes, Micoud grew up in Vallauris.

He was a youth product of local AS Cannes' youth system, becoming the side's playmaker after Zinedine Zidane's departure to Girondins de Bordeaux. He helped the club to promotion from the second division in 1993 and qualification to the UEFA Cup in the following season.

=== Bordeaux ===
Playing behind a strike partnership of Lilian Laslandes and Sylvain Wiltord, Micoud played a pivotal role as the club were crowned Ligue 1 champions in 1998–99, beating Olympique de Marseille to the title on the final day of the season.

The following season he helped the club to the UEFA Champions League's second group stage. He also reached two Coupe de la Ligue finals with Bordeaux, losing to RC Strasbourg in 1997 and Paris Saint-Germain in 1998.

=== Parma ===
In the 2000 summer he moved abroad, initially joining Parma where he stayed for two seasons. Although Micoud and Parma won the Coppa Italia, he lost his starting place to Hidetoshi Nakata, and was forced out of the club, linked with moves to Aston Villa, Liverpool, Schalke 04 and Marseille.

=== Werder Bremen ===
In August 2002, Micoud moved to Germany, signing for Werder Bremen. He made his debut for the club in a 3-1 win over 1. FC Nürnberg, scoring one of Bremen's goals.

Micoud was one of the key players in Bremen's surprise double win in 2004, and scored in the decisive game against Bayern Munich where Bremen secured the Bundesliga title. Micoud also scored in every round of the 2003–04 DFB-Pokal, except the final. He ended the season with ten goals and eight assists.

After the season, Micoud signed a new contract with Bremen until 2007, and was described by the club's sporting director Klaus Allofs as 'the best midfielder in the Bundesliga'. It had previously been speculated that Micoud could leave, as he criticised the club for allowing two other key players in Aílton and Mladen Krstajić to join Schalke. The following season saw Bremen finish third in the league.

In his final season with Bremen, Micoud scored five times in the Champions League, including winners against Udinese in the group stage and Juventus in the knockouts. He also scored eight goals and managed fourteen assists in the Bundesliga as Bremen finished runners-up.

Micoud left Bremen to return to former club Bordeaux in 2006, with Klaus Allofs stating that they would not have agreed to sell Micoud to any other club. A friendly match in Bremen's Weserstadion between the two teams was also organised, where Micoud scored the only goal for Bordeaux and was given a standing ovation by the Bremen fans.

=== Return to Bordeaux ===
In June 2006, aged 32, rejoined Bordeaux, costing €three million. He quickly became a key player in the squad, scoring the winner in his first league match back at the club, at FC Lorient. Micoud helped Bordeaux win the 2007 League Cup and fight for the title the following season. In February 2008, Micoud scored his 50th Ligue 1 goal in a 6-0 win against AS Monaco, Bordeaux's record away win. In March, Micoud was involved in a controversy after being accused of diving to help win a penalty in a crucial game with third-placed Nancy, which Bordeaux would win 2-1. However, after two seasons, Laurent Blanc announced on 10 May 2008 that the player's contract would not be renewed, and he retired from the sport.

== International career ==
Despite being called up in the France national team on several occasions, Micoud never managed to secure a regular starting role, mainly due to the presence of Zidane who occupied the same position.

Courtesy of his stellar championship performances with Bordeaux, he made his debut on 17 August 1999 in a friendly match with Northern Ireland, and was subsequently picked for the squad which won UEFA Euro 2000. Micoud only played in one of the six matches of the tournament, in the group match against the Netherlands, effectively a dead rubber given that both nations had already qualified both the group. He assisted Christophe Dugarry's opening goal from a corner, although France eventually lost 3-2.

He was also selected for the FIFA World Cup campaign of 2002, and replaced the injured Zidane for the second game, a 0-0 draw with Uruguay.

Regardless of his consistently high level of performance at club level, Micoud found himself subsequently marginalised by the following national bosses. After the World Cup, he was not picked for France again for two years, before Jacques Santini selected him for a friendly against Holland in March 2004, recognising Micoud's form with Bremen.

Santini included Micoud in his preliminary squad for Euro 2004 but he did not make the final squad. Under Raymond Domenech Micoud did win a single call up for the 2006 World Cup qualifiers, and Micoud publicly criticised Domenech for ignoring his Bremen performances, suggesting that Domenech's refusal to pick him may be influenced by Micoud's star sign.

== Career statistics ==
=== Club ===
Appearances and goals by club, season and competition
Club	Season	League			Natioal cup		League cup		Europe		Total		Ref.
Club	Season	Division	Apps	Goals	Apps	Goals	Apps	Goals	Apps	Goals	Apps	Goals	Ref.
Cannes	1992–93	Division 2	28	2	1	0	–		–		29	2	
Cannes	1993–94	Division 1	34	3	1	0	–		–		35	3	
Cannes	1994–95	Division 1	33	7	1	0	1	0	4	1	39	8	
Cannes	1995–96	Division 1	32	5	1	1	3	0	–		36	6	
Cannes	Total		127	17	4	1	4	0	4	1	139	19	–
Bordeaux	1996–97	Division 1	36	8	4	1	4	0	–		44	9	
Bordeaux	1997–98	Division 1	29	4	1	0	5	3	1	0	36	7	
Bordeaux	1998–99	Division 1	31	9	1	0	1	0	8	3	41	12	
Bordeaux	1999–2000	Division 1	31	6	5	1	2	0	12	2	50	9	
Bordeaux	Total		127	27	11	2	12	3	21	5	171	37	–
Parma	2000–01	Serie A	29	4	6	2	–		4	1	39	7	
Parma	2001–02	Serie A	18	5	6	1	–		2	0	26	6	
Parma	Total		47	9	12	3	0	0	6	1	65	13	–
Werder Bremen	2002–03	Bundesliga	28	5	3	0	0	0	4	2	35	7	
Werder Bremen	2003–04	Bundesliga	32	10	6	4	–		4	1	42	15	
Werder Bremen	2004–05	Bundesliga	33	8	5	2	2	0	8	1	48	11	
Werder Bremen	2005–06	Bundesliga	30	8	2	1	2	0	10	5	44	14	
Werder Bremen	Total		123	31	16	7	4	0	26	9	169	47	–
Bordeaux	2006–07	Ligue 1	32	5	1	0	4	0	6	0	43	5	
Bordeaux	2007–08	Ligue 1	29	5	3	2	0	0	6	1	38	8	
Bordeaux	Total		61	10	4	2	4	0	12	1	81	13	–
Career total			485	94	47	15	24	3	69	17	625	129	–

=== International ===
Appearances and goals by national team and year
National team	Year	Apps	Goals
France	1999	2	0
France	2000	7	1
France	2001	3	0
France	2002	4	0
France	2004	1	0
Total		17	1

Scores and results list France's goal tally first, score column indicates score after each Micoud goal.

List of international goals scored by Johan Micoud
No.	Date	Venue	Opponent	Score	Result	Competition
1	15 November 2000	BJK İnönü Stadium, Istanbul, Turkey	Turkey	3–0	4–0	Friendly

== Honours ==
Bordeaux

- Division 1: 1998–99
- Coupe de la Ligue: 2006–07

Parma

- Coppa Italia: 2001–02

Werder Bremen

- Bundesliga: 2003–04
- DFB-Pokal: 2003–04

France

- UEFA European Championship: 2000

Individual

- kicker Bundesliga Team of the Season: 2002–03, 2003–04, 2005–06
