= Jakub Wierzchowski =

Polish footballer (born 1977)

Personal information
- Date of birth: 15 April 1977 (age 49)
- Place of birth: Lublin, Poland
- Height: 1.93 m (6 ft 4 in)
- Position: Goalkeeper

Senior career*
Years	Team	Apps	(Gls)
1994–1997	Lublinianka		
1997–1998	Górnik Łęczna		
1998–1999	Wisła Kraków	3	(0)
1999–2001	Ruch Chorzów	55	(0)
2001–2003	Werder Bremen	3	(0)
2003–2006	Wisła Płock	56	(0)
2006–2007	Zagłębie Sosnowiec	3	(0)
2007–2008	Polonia Bytom	0	(0)
2008–2012	Górnik Łęczna	80	(0)
2013	KS Lublin		

International career
2000–2002	Poland	2	(0)
- * Club domestic league appearances and goals

Jakub Wierzchowski (born 15 April 1977) is a Polish former professional footballer who played as a goalkeeper. From 2011 to 2013, he was the goalkeeping coach of Górnik Łęczna.

== Club career ==
Wierzchowski joined Bundesliga club Werder Bremen in summer 2001 on a three-year contract. The transfer fee paid to Ruch Chorzów was reported as DM1 million (equivalent to €511292 at the time). During his time at Werder Bremen he and goalkeeping rival Pascal Borel were labelled the "weakest goalkeepers in the Bundesliga" by Süddeutsche Zeitung journalist Ralf Wiegand and afterwards "not ready for the first league" by the Frankfurter Allgemeine Zeitung's Frank Heike.

In January 2008, he joined Górnik Łęczna. He extended his contract to summer 2011 in June 2009.

== International career ==
Wierzchowski was a part of Poland national team for which he made two appearances.

== Honours ==
Wisła Kraków

- Ekstraklasa: 1998–99

Wisła Płock

- Polish Cup: 2005–06
