= Blaise Mamoum =

Cameroonian footballer (born 1979)

Personal information
- Date of birth: 25 December 1979 (age 45)
- Place of birth: Bamenda, Cameroon
- Height: 1.70 m (5 ft 7 in)
- Position: Forward

Senior career*
Years	Team	Apps	(Gls)
1997–2000	Saint-Étienne	2	(0)
1999–2000	→ Red Star (loan)		
2000–2001	Scunthorpe United	1	(0)
2000–2003	Werder Bremen II	52	(28)
2002–2003	Werder Bremen	0	(0)
2002–2003	Waldhof Mannheim	13	(1)
2003–2005	Hamburger SV II	40	(4)
2006–2008	Andrézieux-Bouthéon FC		
- FCO Firminy Insersport
- * Club domestic league appearances and goals

Blaise Mamoum (born 25 December 1979) is a Cameroonian former professional footballer who played as a forward.

== Career ==
Mamoum was born in Bamenda, Cameroon. After making one appearance for French Division 2 side Saint-Étienne, Mamoum signed for English outfit Scunthorpe United but soon left due to not liking it there.

For the 2000–01 season, he signed for Werder Bremen in the Bundesliga where he played for the club's reserves, before joining Waldhof Mannheim in the second division, where he made 13 league appearances.

In 2003, Mamoum signed for Bundesliga team Hamburger SV, but again did not make a league appearance and eventually returned to France because of injury, where he played in the lower leagues with Andrézieux-Bouthéon as well as FCO Firminy Insersport.
