= Mike Barten =

German footballer (born 1973)

Personal information
- Date of birth: 20 November 1973 (age 52)
- Place of birth: Lübeck, West Germany
- Height: 1.80 m (5 ft 11 in)
- Position: Defender

Youth career
- ESV Hansa Lübeck
- VfB Lübeck
- Werder Bremen

Senior career*
Years	Team	Apps	(Gls)
1993–2003	Werder Bremen II		
1998–2003	Werder Bremen	34	(0)
2003	SC Weyhe		
2004	Erzgebirge Aue	4	(0)
2004–2007	SV Wilhelmshaven		
2007–2008	FC Oberneuland	7	(0)

Managerial career
- 2008: FC Oberneuland
- 2008–2009: Hansa Rostock (assistant)
- 2009–2011: FC Oberneuland
- 2012–2014: TSV Blau-Weiß Melchiorshausen
- 2014–2016: Hannover 96 (youth)
- 2016: Hannover 96 (assistant)
- 2016–2018: Hannover 96 II
- 2018–2020: Hannover 96 (youth)
- 2021: TSV Ottersberg
- * Club domestic league appearances and goals

Mike Barten (born 20 November 1973) is a German football coach and a former player.

== Managerial career ==
=== Early career ===
In 2008, Barten worked as head coach for FC Oberneuland.

In June 2012, it was announced he would manage lower league side TSV Blau-Weiß Melchiorshausen in the 2012–13 season. He remained at the club till 2014.

=== Hannover 96 ===
From 2014 to 2016, Barten was youth coach at Hannover 96. In 2016, he became assistant coach to manager Daniel Stendel at the club. He works as youth coach for Hannover 96.

== Honours ==
Werder Bremen

- DFB-Pokal: 1998–99; runner-up 1999–2000
- DFB-Ligapokal: runner-up 1999
