= Holger Wehlage =

German footballer (born 1976)

Personal information
- Date of birth: 3 July 1976 (age 50)
- Place of birth: Meppen, West Germany
- Height: 1.79 m (5 ft 10 in)
- Position: Midfielder

Youth career
- 1983–1995: SV Meppen

Senior career*
Years	Team	Apps	(Gls)
1996–1998	SV Meppen	7	(0)
1998–1999	VfB Lübeck	34	(3)
1999–2001	FC St. Pauli	46	(3)
2001–2004	Werder Bremen	14	(1)
2003	→ Union Berlin (loan)	15	(1)
2004–2005	MSV Duisburg	28	(0)
2005–2007	Rot-Weiss Essen	50	(8)
2007–2009	Eintracht Braunschweig	22	(2)
Total		216	(18)
- * Club domestic league appearances and goals

Holger Wehlage (born 3 July 1976) is a German former professional footballer who played as a midfielder.

== Honours ==
Werder Bremen

- Bundesliga: 2004
- DFB-Pokal: 2004
