= Ludovic Magnin =

Swiss football player and manager (born 1979)

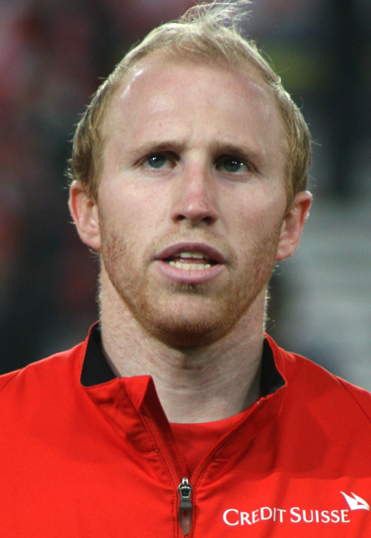
- Magnin in 2006

Personal information
- Date of birth: 20 April 1979 (age 47)
- Place of birth: Lausanne, Switzerland
- Height: 1.86 m (6 ft 1 in)
- Position: Left-back

Team information
- Current team: Lausanne-Sport (head coach)

Youth career
- 1987–1996: FC Echallens
- 1996–1997: Lausanne-Sports

Senior career*
Years	Team	Apps	(Gls)
1997–2000	Yverdon Sport	96	(2)
2000–2002	Lugano	47	(0)
2002–2005	Werder Bremen	45	(4)
2005–2009	VfB Stuttgart	103	(2)
2010–2012	FC Zürich	56	(1)
Total		347	(9)

International career
2000–2010	Switzerland	62	(3)

Managerial career
- 2018–2020: FC Zürich
- 2021–2022: Rheindorf Altach
- 2022–2025: Lausanne-Sport
- 2025–2026: Basel
- 2026–: Lausanne-Sport
- * Club domestic league appearances and goals

Ludovic Magnin (French pronunciation: [maɲɛ̃]; born 20 April 1979) is a Swiss football manager and a former player who is currently the head coach of Swiss Super League club Lausanne-Sports.

He played as a left-back for the Switzerland national team, Yverdon Sport, FC Lugano, Werder Bremen, VfB Stuttgart, and FC Zürich.

As a manager he won the Swiss Cup with Zurich in 2018 and following that had spells in charge of Rheindorf Altach and Lausanne-Sport.

== Club career ==
=== Youth teams ===
Born in Lausanne, Magnin started his career at FC Echallens, where he played until 1996. He spent one season at Lausanne Sports before joining second-tier Yverdon Sports.

=== Switzerland and Germany ===
In 1999, he made his professional debut for Yverdon Sports. In the summer of 2000, he transferred to Ticino side FC Lugano, then playing in the first-tier Axpo Super League.

In the beginning of 2002, Magnin made his biggest career move by joining Bundesliga side Werder Bremen for the transfer sum of approximately 1 million Swiss Francs. He won the double of Bundesliga and DFB-Pokal with the Northern German side in 2004, but had bad luck with many injuries and played only 45 games in four years in Bremen.

In 2005, he transferred to Southern Germany, to Swabian side VfB Stuttgart. There Ludo, as he is being called by Stuttgart fans, became a first-team regular within the first season and was a key player for his team in the following 2006–07 season, when he became German champion for the second time in his career. In early 2008, he extended his contract until June 2010. When his starting position in the team began to erode in the beginning of the 2009–10 season, Magnin decided to leave Stuttgart in order to keep his chances of playing for the Swiss national squad at the 2010 World Cup. Therefore, he returned to his native country in January 2010, joining FC Zürich. Magnin made 103 appearances scoring two goals in four and a half years at VfB.

On 27 August 2012, Magnin announced that he had decided to end his playing career. Having suffered a back injury before the 2012–13 season, he expected to play until the end of the season, but shortly after admitted that it was impossible to remain as a player. He also mentioned that he would serve as an assistant coach of FC Zürich junior team.

== International career ==
Magnin has acquired 61 caps and scored three goals for the Switzerland national team since his debut in 2000. He has been called up to the 2008 European Football Championship, where he has inherited the captaincy due to an injury to Alexander Frei and was the vice-captain after Frei. He also participated at the 2006 FIFA World Cup and the UEFA Euro 2004.

Magnin was initially omitted from the Switzerland squad for the 2010 World Cup but was later called up to replace the injured Christoph Spycher.

== Managerial career ==
=== FC Zürich ===
On 20 February 2018, Magnin was announced as the new head coach of Swiss Super League club FC Zürich, replacing Ulrich Forte. His first trophy as a manager was the 2017–18 Swiss Cup, where Zürich beat Young Boys in the final on 27 May 2018. He was dismissed after more than two seasons in charge after a poor start to the 2020–21 season, which saw the club bottom of the league after three matchdays.

=== Rheindorf Altach ===
On 30 December 2021, Magnin became the new head coach of Austrian Football Bundesliga side Rheindorf Altach, who were bottom of the league. He signed a contract until 2023. On 20 May 2022, after a crucial 2–1 win over WSG Tirol, Altach avoided relegation by finishing one point ahead of Admira Wacker Mödling.

=== Lausanne-Sport ===
Three days after heeding Rheindorf Altach from relegation, Magnin was announced as the new head coach of his hometown club Lausanne-Sport, who had recently been relegated to the Swiss Challenge League.

=== FC Basel ===
On 16 June 2025, he was appointed as the head coach of reigning Swiss champions FC Basel. He was terminated on 26 January 2026, due to stagnating results. At the time of his sacking, Basel sat in 4th place of the Super League with a ten-point deficit compared to leader FC Thun. In his final game in charge, Basel had won a dramatic away match against FC Zürich with 4–3, featuring an injury time winner by Xherdan Shaqiri. In the week prior, they had suffered a 3–1 loss to RB Salzburg in the Europa League.

=== Return to Lausanne-Sport ===
On 4 November 2026, he returned to manage Lausanne-Sports on a 18 months contract, with the objective of saving the club from relegation.

== Career statistics ==
=== International ===
Scores and results list Switzerland's goal tally first, score column indicates score after each Magnin goal.

List of international goals scored by Ludovic Magnin
No.	Date	Venue	Opponent	Score	Result	Competition
1	13 February 2002	Tsirion Stadium, Limassol	Hungary	1–0	2–1	Friendly
2	8 October 2005	Wankdorfstadion, Bern	France	1–1	1–1	2006 World Cup qualifier
3	11 September 2007	Wörtherseestadion, Klagenfurt	Japan	1–0	3–4	Friendly

=== Managerial ===
As of 26 January 2026

Managerial record by team and tenure
Team	From	To	Record					Ref.
Team	From	To	P	W	D	L	Win %	Ref.
Zürich	20 February 2018	5 October 2020	108	38	25	45	35.19	
Rheindorf Altach	30 December 2021	23 May 2022	13	4	3	6	30.77	
Lausanne-Sport	23 May 2022	16 June 2025	123	50	33	40	40.65	
Basel	16 June 2025	26 January 2026	33	14	8	11	42.42	
Lausanne-Sport	4 November 2026	present	1	0	1	0	0.00	
Total				106	69	102	38.1	—

== Honours ==
=== Player ===
Werder Bremen

- Bundesliga: 2003–04
- DFB-Pokal: 2003–04

VfB Stuttgart

- Bundesliga: 2006–07

=== Manager ===
FC Zürich

- Swiss Cup: 2017–18
