= Marco Stier =

German footballer

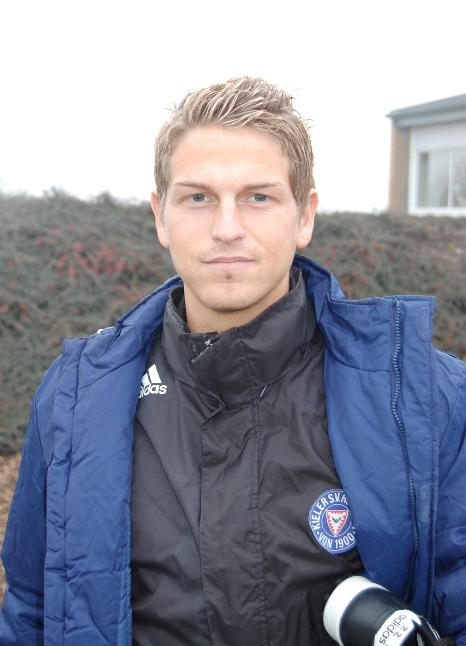
- Stier with Holstein Kiel

Personal information
- Full name: Marco Stier
- Date of birth: 26 March 1984 (age 42)
- Place of birth: Hamburg, West Germany
- Height: 1.80 m (5 ft 11 in)
- Position: Midfielder

Youth career
- SC Concordia von 1907
- SV St. Georg
- –1999: FC St. Pauli
- 1999–2002: Werder Bremen

Senior career*
Years	Team	Apps	(Gls)
2002–2006	Werder Bremen II	50	(6)
2006–2009	Bayern Munich II	14	(0)
2009–2010	Holstein Kiel	27	(3)
2010–2012	Hallescher FC	6	(0)
Total		97	(9)

International career
	Germany U17	6	(0)
	Germany U18	15	(5)
	Germany U19	15	(9)
	Germany U20	3	(2)
- * Club domestic league appearances and goals

Marco Stier (born 26 March 1984) is a German former professional footballer who played as a midfielder. He represented Germany internationally at youth levels U17 through U20.

== Club career ==
Born in Hamburg, Stier joined SV Werder Bremen's youth system from FC St. Pauli in 1999. After prolific seasons with the Under-17 and Under-19 sides he signed his first professional contract with the club in 2001. In March 2002, he made his senior debut with SV Werder Bremen II in the third-tier Regionalliga Nord against Dresdner SC and scored with his first touch.

Stier joined Bayern Munich in summer 2006 and was to play initially for the reserves. He had to wait two years to make his debut, owing to injuries, and left Bayern Munich II on 26 January 2009 to join Holstein Kiel.

== International career ==
Stier was a Germany youth international playing for youth levels U17 through U20.
