= Danny Fütterer =

German footballer (born 1975)

Personal information
- Date of birth: 28 August 1975 (age 51)
- Place of birth: Bremen, West Germany
- Height: 1.75 m (5 ft 9 in)
- Position: Midfielder

Youth career
- SC Weyhe

Senior career*
Years	Team	Apps	(Gls)
1993–2005	Werder Bremen II		
1998–2001	Werder Bremen	1	(0)
2005–2006	VSK Osterholz-Scharmbeck		
2006–2007	CF Victoria Bremen 05		
2008	Brinkumer SV		
- * Club domestic league appearances and goals

Danny Fütterer (born 28 August 1975) is a German former professional footballer who played as a midfielder. He made his debut on the professional league level in the Bundesliga for Werder Bremen on 7 May 1999 when he started in a game against Eintracht Frankfurt.

== Honours ==
- DFB-Pokal: 1998–99
