= Björn Schierenbeck =

German footballer

Personal information
- Date of birth: 12 July 1974 (age 52)
- Place of birth: Bremen, West Germany
- Height: 1.95 m (6 ft 5 in)
- Positions: Defender; midfielder

Team information
- Current team: Werder Bremen (Youth coordinator)

Youth career
- SC Weyhe

Senior career*
Years	Team	Apps	(Gls)
1995–2007	Werder Bremen II	290	(40)
1996–2001	Werder Bremen	16	(0)
1998–1999	→ Greuther Fürth (loan)	2	(0)
Total		308	(40)
- * Club domestic league appearances and goals

Björn Schierenbeck (born 12 July 1974) is a German former professional footballer who played as a defender or midfielder.

== Career ==
Born in Bremen, Schierenbeck made his debut on the professional league level on 22 February 1996 in the Bundesliga for SV Werder Bremen coming on as a 90th-minute substitute for Christian Brand in a game against Hansa Rostock.

== Honours ==
- DFB-Pokal: 1999
