= Kamień =

Kamień (Polish for "stone") may refer to:

== Places ==
- Kamień Pomorski, a town in West Pomeranian Voivodeship (north-west Poland), seat of Kamień County
- Kamień Krajeński, a town in Kuyavian-Pomeranian Voivodeship (north-central Poland)
- Kamień, Lwówek County in Lower Silesian Voivodeship (south-west Poland)
- Kamień, Oleśnica County in Lower Silesian Voivodeship (south-west Poland)
- Kamień, Wrocław County in Lower Silesian Voivodeship (south-west Poland)
- Kamień, Kuyavian-Pomeranian Voivodeship (north-central Poland)
- Kamień, Chełm County in Lublin Voivodeship (east Poland)
- Kamień, Augustów County in Podlaskie Voivodeship (north-east Poland)
- Kamień, Hajnówka County in Podlaskie Voivodeship (north-east Poland)
- Kamień, Bełchatów County in Łódź Voivodeship (central Poland)
- Kamień, Brzeziny County in Łódź Voivodeship (central Poland)
- Kamień, Opoczno County in Łódź Voivodeship (central Poland)
- Kamień, Zgierz County in Łódź Voivodeship (central Poland)
- Kamień, Łuków County in Lublin Voivodeship (east Poland)
- Kamień, Gmina Łaziska in Opole County, Lublin Voivodeship (east Poland)
- Kamień, Lesser Poland Voivodeship (south Poland)
- Kamień, Włodawa County in Lublin Voivodeship (east Poland)
- Kamień, Subcarpathian Voivodeship (south-east Poland)
- Kamień, Białobrzegi County in Masovian Voivodeship (east-central Poland)
- Kamień, Mława County in Masovian Voivodeship (north-central Poland)
- Kamień, Jarocin County in Greater Poland Voivodeship (west-central Poland)
- Kamień, Kalisz County in Greater Poland Voivodeship (central Poland)
- Kamień, Koło County in Greater Poland Voivodeship (central Poland)
- Kamień, Słupca County in Greater Poland Voivodeship (west-central Poland)
- Kamień, Września County in Greater Poland Voivodeship (west-central Poland)
- Kamień, Złotów County in Greater Poland Voivodeship (west-central Poland)
- Kamień, Lubusz Voivodeship (west Poland)
- Kamień, Człuchów County in Pomeranian Voivodeship (north Poland)
- Kamień, Wejherowo County in Pomeranian Voivodeship (north Poland)
- Kamień, Iława County in Warmian-Masurian Voivodeship (north Poland)
- Kamień, Kętrzyn County in Warmian-Masurian Voivodeship (north Poland)
- Kamień, Pisz County in Warmian-Masurian Voivodeship (north-east Poland)
- Kamień, Węgorzewo County in Warmian-Masurian Voivodeship (north-east Poland)
- Kamień, Rybnik in Silesian Voivodeship (south Poland)
- Kamień, Minsk Region (central Belarus)

== Other uses ==
- Adina Kamien (born 1971), art curator
- Ana Kamien (born 1935), Argentine choreographer
- Roger Kamien (born 1934), Israeli musicologist
- DZihan & Kamien, a jazz music duo based in Austria
- Kamień (album), 1995 album by Polish singer Kayah

== See also ==
- Karien
