= Zebrzydowice =

Zebrzydowice may refer to the following places in southern Poland:

- Zebrzydowice, Lesser Poland Voivodeship (south-west Poland)
- Zebrzydowice, Silesian Voivodeship (south Poland)
- Zebrzydowice, Rybnik in Silesian Voivodeship (south Poland)
