= Golejów =

Golejów may refer to the following places in Poland:

- Golejów, Lower Silesian Voivodeship (south-west Poland)
- Golejów, Rybnik in Silesian Voivodeship (south Poland)
