= Śródmieście =

Śródmieście (Polish, 'city centre' or 'downtown) may refer to the following places in Poland:

- Śródmieście, Warsaw
- Śródmieście, Gdańsk
- Śródmieście, Gdynia
- Śródmieście, Katowice
- Śródmieście, Rybnik
- Śródmieście, Szczecin
  - Śródmieście (former district of Szczecin)
- Śródmieście, Wrocław
