= Rybnik =

Rybnik Rybńik (Silesian)
- City county
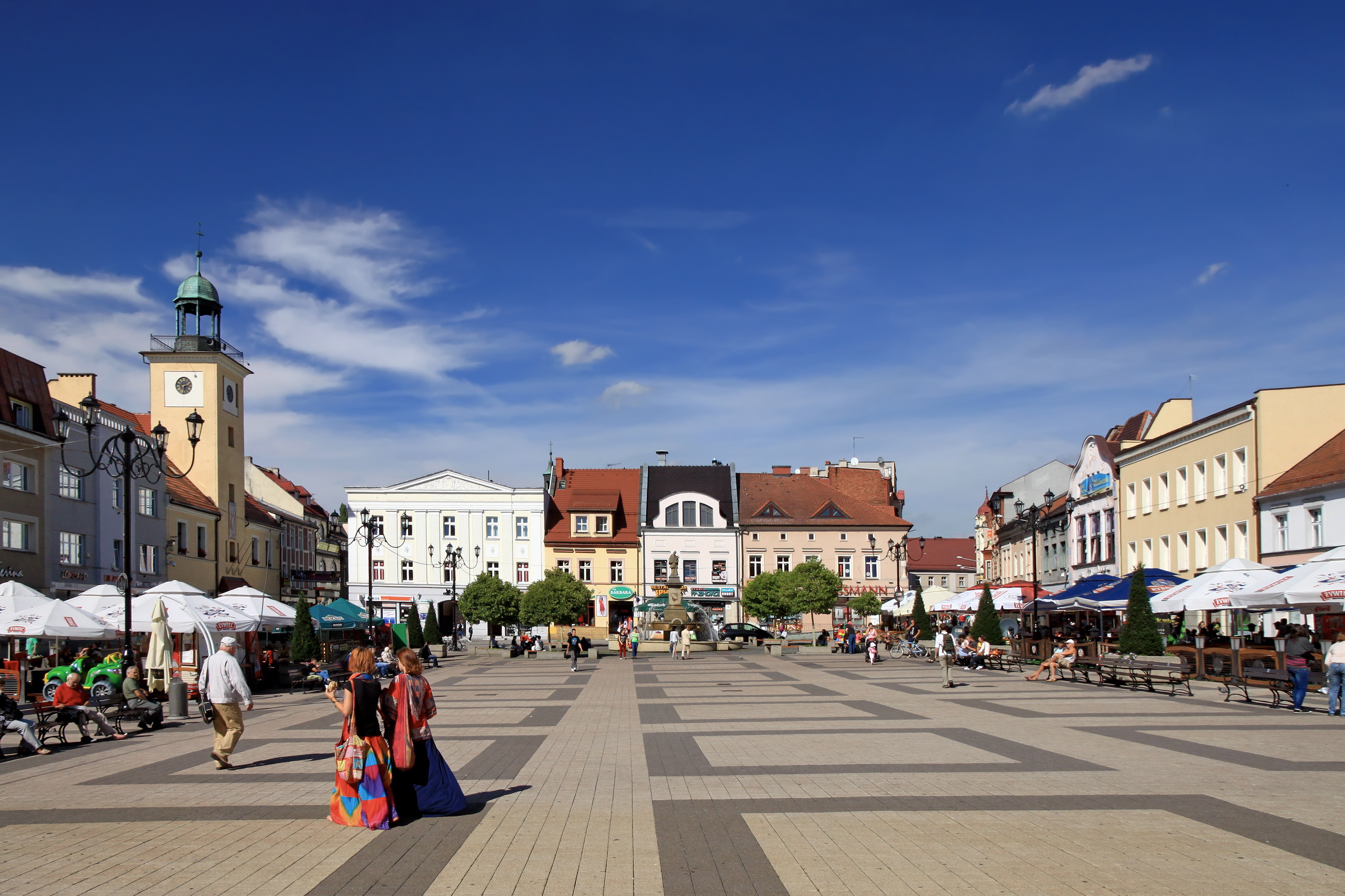
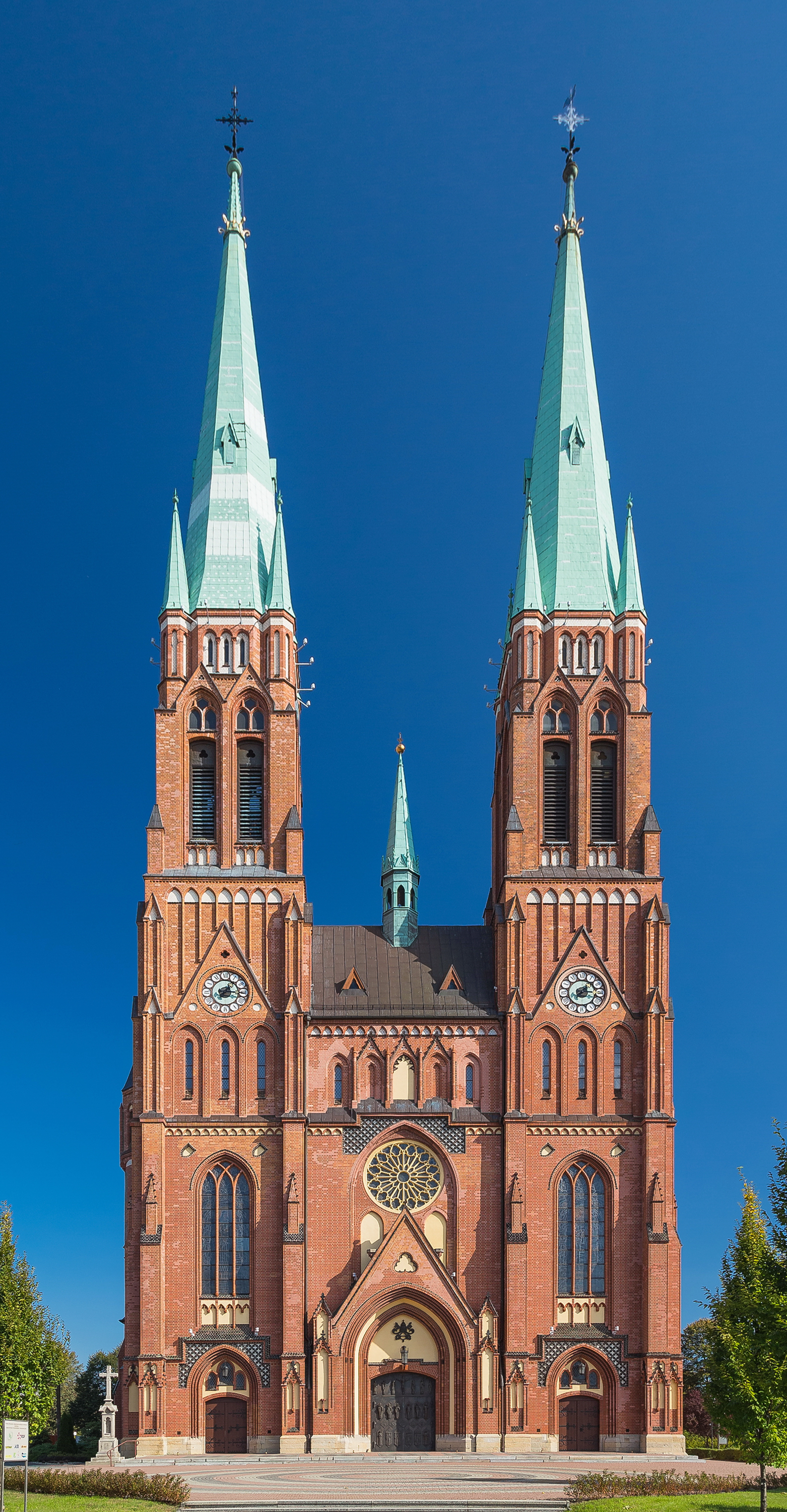
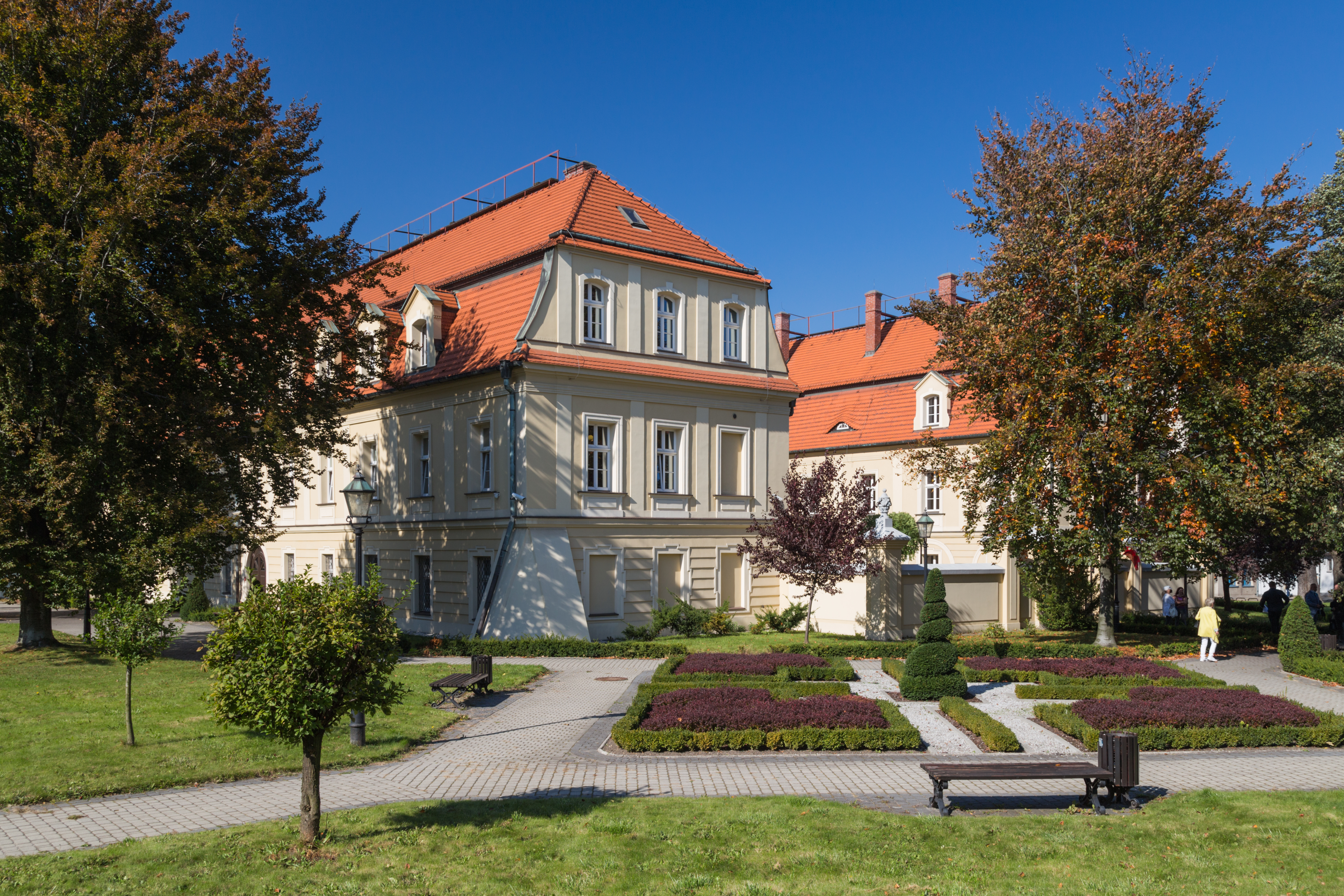
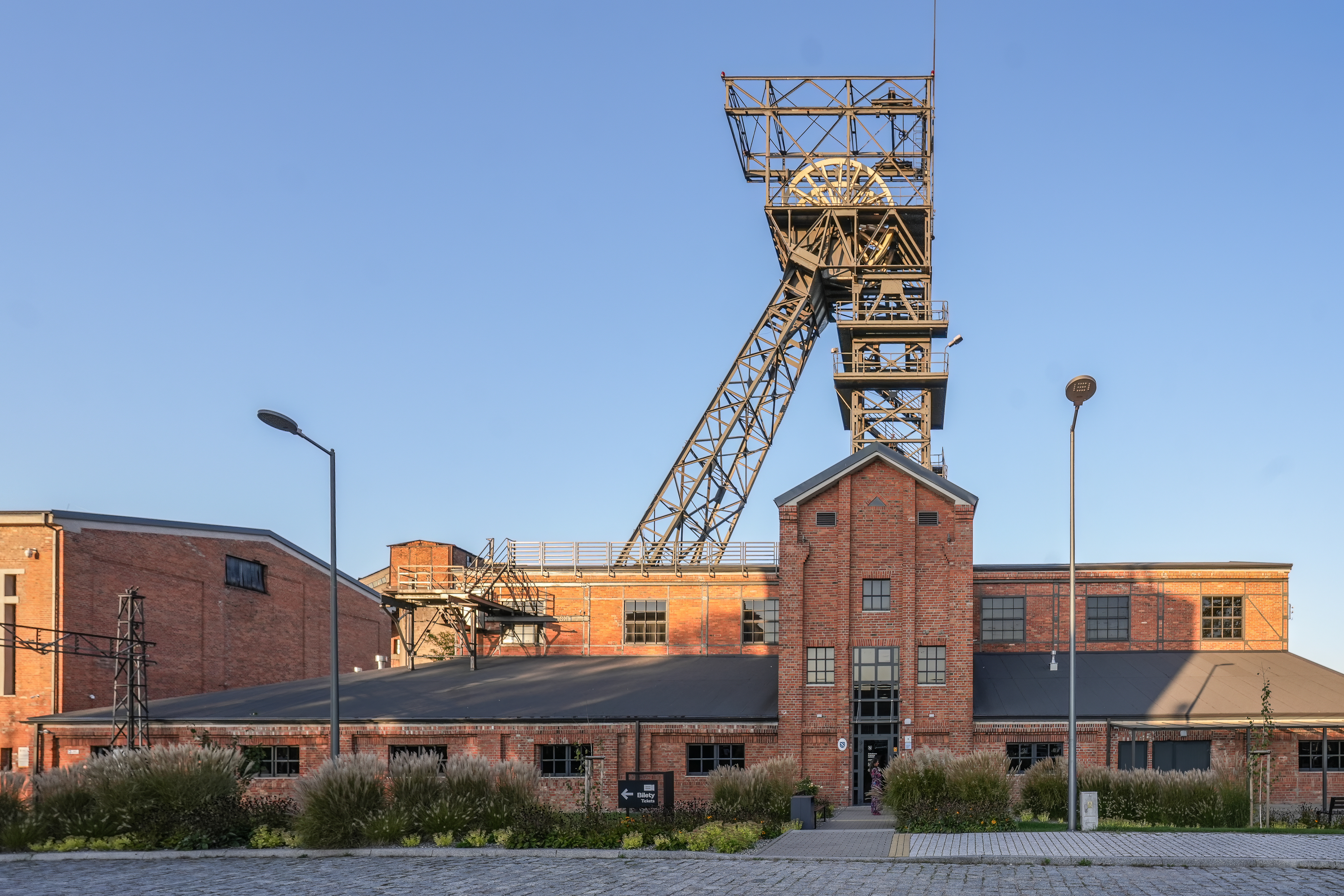
- From top, left to right: Main Square; Basilica; Former Piast Castle, now District Court; Heritage coal mine Ignacy

- Flag Coat of arms

- Location within Poland
- Coordinates: 50°5′N 18°33′E
- Country: Poland
- Voivodeship: Silesian
- County: city county
- Established: 10th century
- City rights: before 1308

Government
  - Mayor: Piotr Kuczera

Area
  - City county: 148 km^{2} (57 sq mi)
- Highest elevation: 290 m (950 ft)
- Lowest elevation: 210 m (690 ft)

Population (31 December 2025)
  - City county: 122,036 ▼
  - Density: 930/km^{2} (2,400/sq mi)
  - Metro: 527 017
- Time zone: UTC+1 (CET)
  - Summer (DST): UTC+2 (CEST)
- Postal code: 44-200 to 44-292
- Area code: +48 32
- Car plates: SR, IR
- Website: www.rybnik.pl

Rybnik (Polish pronunciation: [ˈrɨbɲik]; Silesian: Rybńik, Ribńich; German: Reibnig) is a city in southern Poland, in the Silesian Voivodeship, around 38 km (24 mi) southwest of Katowice, the region's capital, and around 19 km (12 mi) from the Czech border. It is one of the major cities of the Katowice-Ostrava metropolitan area with a population of 5.3 million and the main city of the so-called Subregion Zachodni, previously also known as the Rybnik Coal Area. The city currently has a population of 122,026 inhabitants as of December 31, 2025.

Rybnik is the center of commerce, business, transportation and culture for the southwestern part of the Silesian Voivodeship, a consolidated city-county and the seat of a separate suburban Rybnik county. Rybnik is particularly recognized for its contributions to music, with the Szafrankowie School of Music musicians such as Henryk Górecki or Lidia Grychtołówna, among others. It is also a seat of the Rybnik Philharmonic Orchestra.

The name Rybnik derives from an old Slavic word rybnik, meaning a pond (Czech language still uses it, while in Polish the modern word is staw), which was located in the place of the current market square. In the Middle Ages, three settlements merged into one town, with a Magdeburg rights location dating back to 1308. Fishing, trade and artistry were the main industries. Rybnik's development accelerated in late 19th century upon discovery of rich coal fields, and continued until the 1980s. Since the 1990s, the city attempts to diversify its economy with commerce, health care and business industries.

== History ==
The city's name derives from the Proto-Slavic word for "fish" (ryba) and meant "fishpond" in the Old Polish language. The name highlights the importance of fish farming for the city's economy in the Middle Ages, which is reflected in its coat of arms until this day.

The city's origins can be traced back into the 9th and 10th century, when three Slavic settlements existed on Rybnik's present-day territory which eventually merged to form one town. It became part of the emerging Polish state under its first historic ruler Mieszko I in the 10th century. In the course of the medieval eastward migration of German settlers (Ostsiedlung), Rybnik, as many other Polish settlements, was incorporated (granted city status and right) according to the so-called Magdeburg Law at some point before 1308 (the exact date remains unknown). This, however, is not to be confused with a change in national affiliation; Rybnik continued to be part of the Kingdom of Poland, until most of Silesia became a fiefdom of the Bohemian Crown in 1327, however Rybnik was still ruled by local Polish dukes of the Piast dynasty until 1336.

The city continued to grow and developed into a regional trade centre. In the 15th century, the Hussites devastated the city, before being eventually defeated in a decisive battle on a hill nearby in 1433, with Poles and Czechs fighting on both sides. Around 1469 the city passed under Hungarian suzerainty, and in 1490 it fell back to Bohemia. From 1521 Rybnik was again ruled by Polish Piast dukes, as it was integrated with the Duchy of Opole and Racibórz, before in 1532 it eventually was incorporated into Bohemia, which itself came under the authority of the Habsburg crown. Then the city became the capital of a state country held by various noble families, including the Polish Węgierski family of Rola coat of arms from 1682 until the state country's dissolution in 1788.

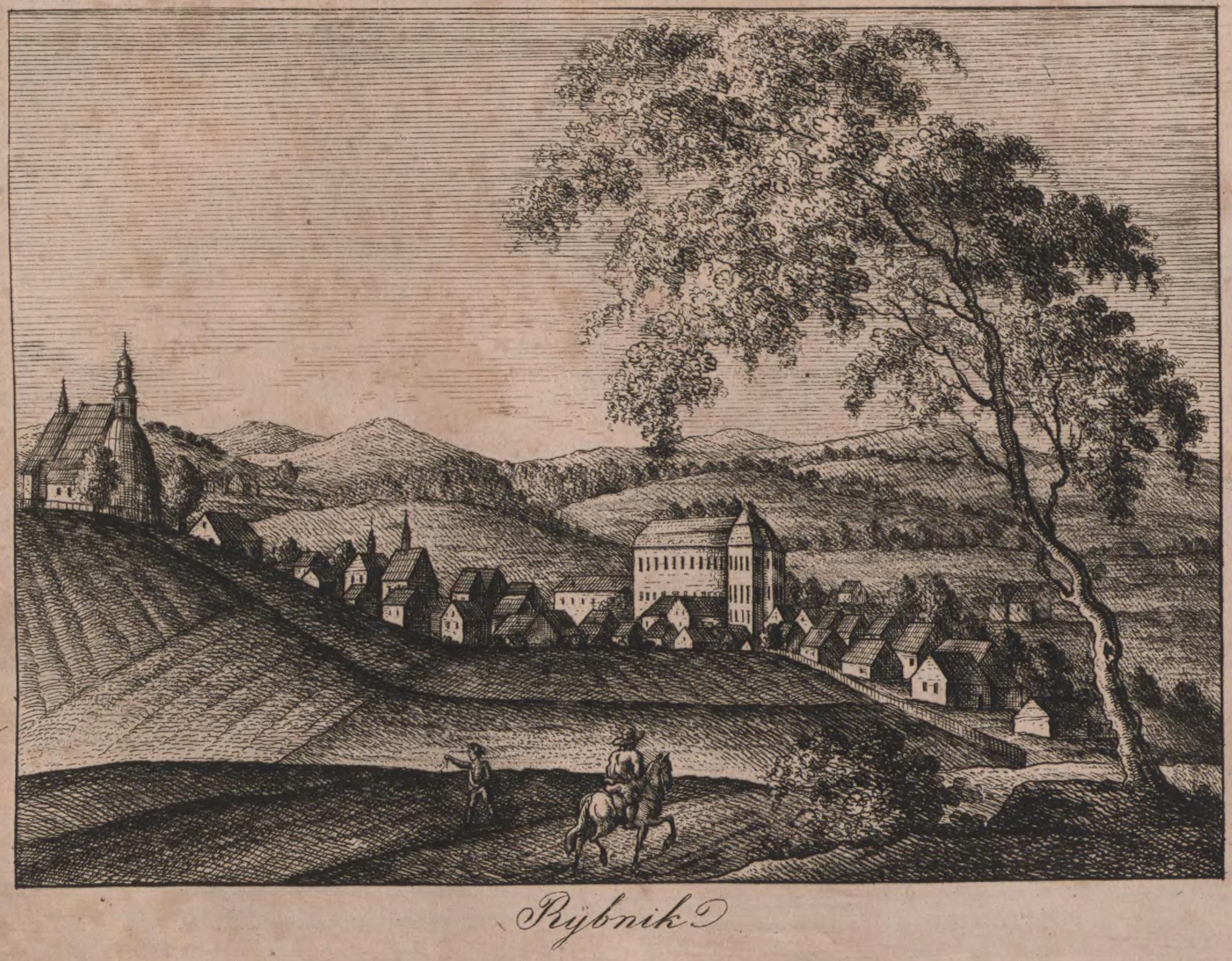
Early 19th-century view of Rybnik

At the beginning of the War of the Austrian Succession between Frederick II of Prussia (the Great) and the Habsburg empress Maria Theresa of Austria, most of Silesia, including Rybnik, was annexed by Prussia in 1740, which Austria eventually recognized in 1763. In the 18th century, Rybnik belonged to the tax inspection region of Prudnik. Coal mining gained importance for Rybnik's economy as early as the 18th century. In 1871, Prussia, including Rybnik, merged into the German Empire, the first modern German nation state. At this point, Poland had already ceased to exist as an independent state, having been divided between Prussia, Austria and Russia in the Third Partition of Poland of 1795.

With the intensification of Germanization and anti-Polish policies in the German Empire in the late 19th and early 20th century, the ethnically mixed region of Upper Silesia became affected by growing tensions between German nationalists and indigenous Poles. A local branch of the Polish Sokół movement was established in 1898. Under pressure from the German police, tenants terminated their leases with the organization, which resulted in several changes of address and, over time, a shift to clandestine activities. In 1900, ten members were arrested and sentenced to prison and fines. After the end of World War I in 1918, the Polish state was finally restored. Amidst an atmosphere of ethnic unrest, the Polish Silesian Uprisings broke out, the first of which (in 1919) was centered on Rybnik, and the Upper Silesia plebiscite was held in 1921 to determine the future state affiliation. The lowest share of pro-German votes was registered in the districts of Rybnik (34.7%) and Pszczyna (25.9%). However, in the city of Rybnik, 70.8% of the votes were in favour of Germany. The city and the larger part of the Rybnik district were attached to Poland. Rybnik thus became Polish-ruled for the first time since 1788.

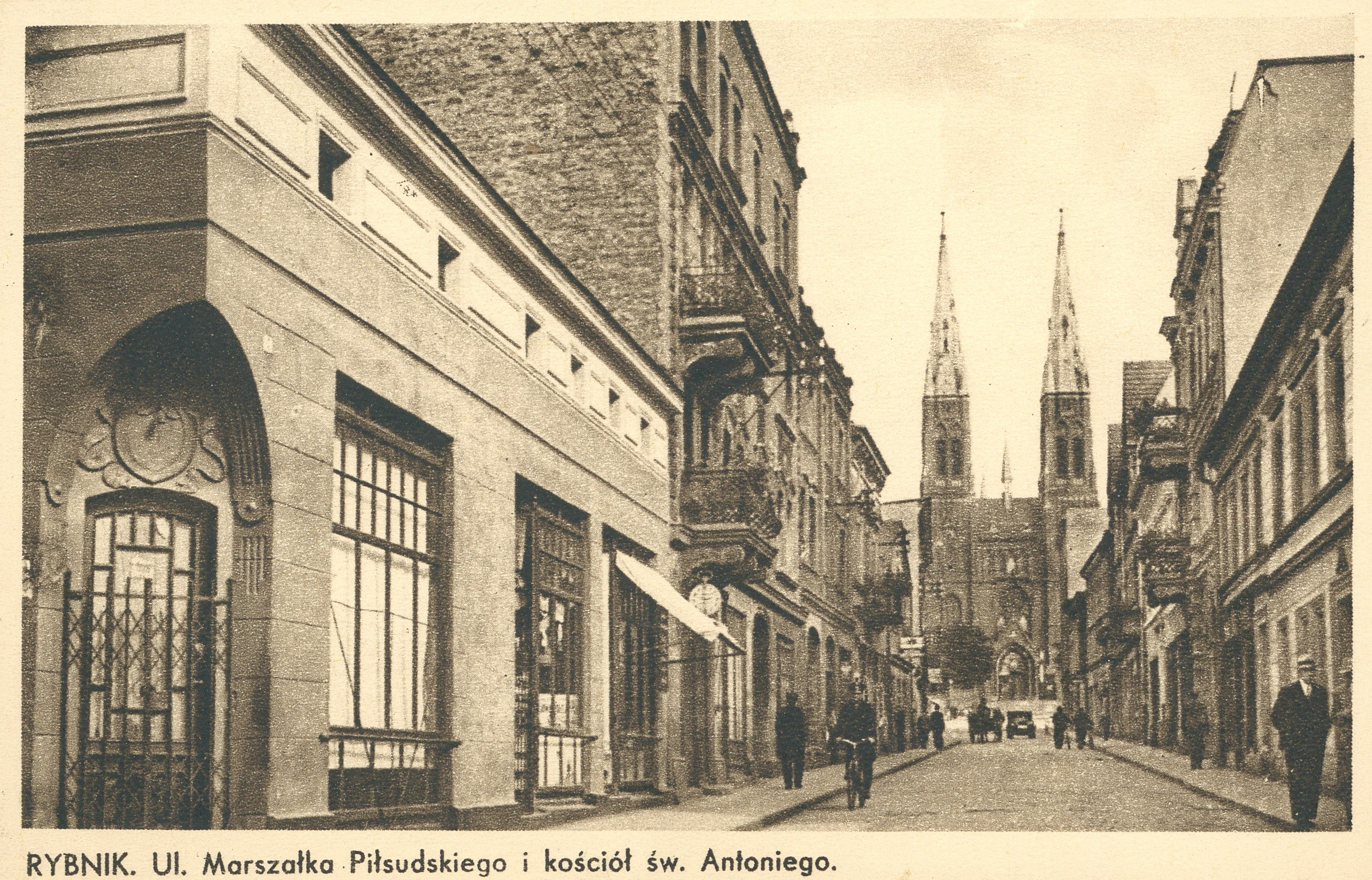
Rybnik on a postcard from the interwar period

Within the Second Polish Republic of the interwar period, Rybnik was part of the Silesian Voivodeship and enjoyed far-reaching political and financial autonomy. In 1933, brothers Karol and Antoni Szafranek, eminent Polish musicians, founded a music school, today known as the Karol and Antoni Szafranek Secondary and Tertiary State School of Music.

During the joint German-Soviet invasion of Poland, which started World War II, in September 1939, Rybnik was captured by Germany, and the Einsatzgruppe I entered the city to commit atrocities against Poles. Under German occupation the city was directly annexed into Germany. The population was ethnically categorized and either "re-Germanized" or disfranchised and partially expelled into the General Government (German-occupied central Poland). Local teachers and school principals were among Polish teachers and principals murdered in Nazi concentration camps. The Germans operated a Nazi prison in the city. The Polenlager No. 97, a forced labour camp for Poles, was operated in the city from 1942 to 1945. In the camp, the Germans mainly held children whose parents were either arrested or deported to Germany, and also elderly people. Nevertheless, the Polish resistance movement was active in Rybnik. In the final stages of the war, in January 1945, the Germans murdered 385 prisoners of the Auschwitz concentration camp in the city during a death march.

After the eventual German defeat which ended World War II in the European theatre of war in 1945, Rybnik was once more integrated into Poland, the territory of which was shifted westward on Joseph Stalin's initiative. Rybnik thus ceased to be a German-Polish border city. A large portion of ethnic Germans from Rybnik eventually settled in the West German city of Dorsten, which eventually became one of Rybnik's twin towns in 1994.

In the post-war period, coal mining continued to gain importance. Under Poland's communist rule in 1945–1989 the city was projected to grow as a main mining centre of southern Poland. The 1970s saw the construction of an important coal-fired power plant. A reservoir on the river Ruda was constructed to provide it with cooling water. In 2002, the University of Economics (Akademia Ekomomiczna), the University of Silesia (Uniwersytet Śląski), both based in Katowice, and the Silesian Polytechnic University (Politechnika Śląska) based in Gliwice established a joint campus in Rybnik to improve academic training opportunities in the area.

== Population ==
Historical population
Year	Pop.	±%
1581	340	—
1725	680	+100.0%
1796	1,190	+75.0%
1855	2,907	+144.3%
1910	11,700	+302.5%
1931	28,500	+143.6%
1946	23,052	−19.1%
1950	27,222	+18.1%
1960	34,099	+25.3%
1970	43,700	+28.2%
1980	122,732	+180.9%
1990	143,980	+17.3%
2000	143,218	−0.5%
2010	141,410	−1.3%
2020	137,128	−3.0%
2025	122,036	−11.0%

=== Historical population ===
Historically, Rybnik was a small town, with population exceeding 1,000 people only in the late 1700s. It was similar in size to neighboring Żory and Wodzisław Śląski, around half the size of Gliwice and 1/3 the size of Racibórz. The population development accelerated after Upper Silesia was annexed by Prussia in 1740. In 1818, Rybnik became a county seat and in 1856 Rybnik was connected with Racibórz by rail. Two years later, in 1858, Rybnik gained a rail connection with Katowice, further accelerating growth. While the discovery of large coal deposits around Rybnik in late 1800s and early 1900s caused capital inflow and population growth of neighboring villages and settlements, Rybnik continued to be primarily a market town rather than transform into a large industrial city like other towns in the region, particularly in the Upper Silesian Industrial Region. This changed after World War II, when the Polish communist government doubled-down on its heavy industrialization platform, increasing coal production in existing coal mines around Rybnik and building a new city for miners nearby. Due to its central location and existing infrastructure, Rybnik became the center of the Rybnik Coal Area, growing to 44,400 people in 1972.

In the 1970s, under administrative reform, Rybnik annexed a number of neighboring mining towns and villages, growing to 118,200 by the end of the decade. Labor shortages on the local market, created in part by emigration to Germany through the family reunification schemes since the 1950s, motivated large state enterprises to recruit workers in other parts of the country. As a result, by 1970s and 80s approximately 30% of people in Rybnik were recent internal migrants. That migration was a source of ethnic conflict since the 1950s, given that in the eyes of Poles from other parts of the country, indigenous Silesians were Germans, and the anti-German sentiment was still strong in Poland at the time. Rybnik's population continued to grow until the peak in 1997 at 144,943.

=== Current population estimates ===
On December 31, 2025, Rybnik had 122,036 inhabitants, with a population density of 824.6 per km^{2}.

In 2020, age breakdown was as follows: 25,166 (18.4%) under 18, 50,183 (36.6%) aged 18–44, 31,248 (22.8%) aged 45–64, 30,531 (22.3%) 65 and older. Total fertility rate in Rybnik is 1.39 as of 2020, below the replacement level of 2.1 but above the country average of 1.38.

As of the 2011 national census, education breakdown among 15-year-olds and older was as follows: 17,919 (15.8%) had a college degree, 35,709 (31.6%) had a high school diploma, 36,249 (32%) had a vocational school diploma, and 21,265 (20.6%) did not have a high school or vocational school diploma.

=== Nationality, language and religion ===
According to the 2011 census, 85.2% of Rybnik citizens declared Polish nationality, while 28.6% declared nationality other than Polish (since 2011, in the Polish census, one can declare up to two nationalities). Silesians were the largest national minority, at 28.6% (40,311 people), followed by Germans at 0.5% (707). Polish was the most-common language spoken at home, with 94.5% inhabitants declaring it. 24,372 people (17.3%) declared they speak Silesian at home. Since the 2011 census, Poland has experienced a significant influx of immigrants, particularly from Ukraine. In Rybnik, the city hall estimates the Ukrainian immigrant population at around 10,000 as of 2021.

Catholicism was the largest religious denomination in Rybnik according to the 2011 census, with 127,809 adherents (90.69% of all inhabitants). The only other denomination with more than 300 adherents were Jehovah's Witnesses, at 434 adherents (0.31%). 2,270 (1.61%) people declared they had no religion, while 6,785 (4.81%) refused to answer the question and for 2,790 (1.98%) people the question could not be answered. Other religions with places of worship in Rybnik include: Buddhists, Seventh Day Adventists, Lutherans (with a parish since 1742, and a church from 1853), and Pentecostals.

=== Neighborhoods ===
Rybnik is divided into 27 neighborhoods that are considered auxiliary administrative units. Most of them are suburban areas, including: Chwałęcice, Golejów, Gotartowice, Grabownia, Kamień, Kłokocin, Ligota-Ligocka Kuźnia, Meksyk, Ochojec, Orzepowice, Popielów, Radziejów, Rybnicka Kuźnia, Rybnik – Północ, Stodoły, Wielopole, Zamysłów and Zebrzydowice. There are also four former towns that have been merged with Rybnik: Boguszowice Stare, Chwałowice, Niedobczyce and Niewiadom. Two districts (Boguszowice Osiedle and Maroko-Nowiny) are typical Polish housing estates, with large blocks of flats and supporting buildings (such as shops and schools) built in communist time. The remaining three districts, Smolna, Śródmieście and Paruszowiec-Piaski formed the pre-war town of Rybnik. Those areas are densely built-up, with old town, city hall, most of schools, offices and shopping malls in Śródmieście (literally: city centre in Polish) and 19th century factories and houses in Paruszowiec.

== Government and politics ==
=== Local politics ===
Since the 1999 administrative reform, Rybnik is a consolidated city-county (miasto na prawach powiatu), with the mayor (prezydent miasta) who is the executive branch of local government, and a city council (rada miasta) of 25 people, which is the legislative branch. The mayor is elected in a citywide election, while the city council is elected in a proportional elections from four voting districts. Additionally, city charter divides Rybnik into 27 districts with a council each. These district councils have auxiliary status, and their main tasks are: organizing public consultations for decisions such as the zoning plan, social control over city investments in their respective areas, lobbying in the city hall for the district. Rybnik is also the seat of the surrounding suburban Rybnik county but is not a part of it.

The current mayor of Rybnik is Piotr Kuczera of the Civic Platform party - due to term limits, he will not be eligible to be elected again in the next election. In the city council, the Civic Platform-Wspólnie dla Rybnika (Together for Rybnik) coalition is in power, with the Law and Justice party and a local Blok Samorządowy Rybnik (Self-governing Bloc Rybnik) in opposition.

=== National politics ===
In Sejm elections, Rybnik is part of the 30th voting district together with Jastrzębie-Zdrój, Żory, Mikołów, Racibórz, Rybnik and Wodzisław counties, electing 9 MPs. In the most-recent, 2019 parliamentary election, the district elected 5 MPs from Law and Justice Party, 3 from Civic Coalition (Civic Platform, Modern Party and the Greens) and 1 from the Democratic Left Alliance. In Rybnik proper, the results were as follows:

Place	Party	Votes	Vote share
1	Law and Justice	29,524	45.53%
2	Civic Coalition	19,732	30.43%
3	Democratic Left Alliance	6,424	9.91%
4	Confederation Liberty and Independence	4,725	7.29%
5	Polish People's Party	3,425	5.28%
6	Coalition of Non-Partisan Local Government Leaders	1,022	1.58%
	Total	64,852	100%

In the Senate elections, Rybnik is part of the 73rd voting district together with Rybnik and Mikołów counties, represented by Wojciech Piecha (Law and Justice). The most-recent election results in Rybnik city were:

Place	Candidate	Party	Votes	Vote share
1	Wojciech Piecha	Law and Justice	28,837	44.94%
2	Grzegorz Wolnik	Civic Coalition	25,538	39.79%
3	Paweł Helis	Silesians Together	9,799	15.27%
	Total		64,174	100%

== Tourism ==
Historic sights of Rybnik (examples)

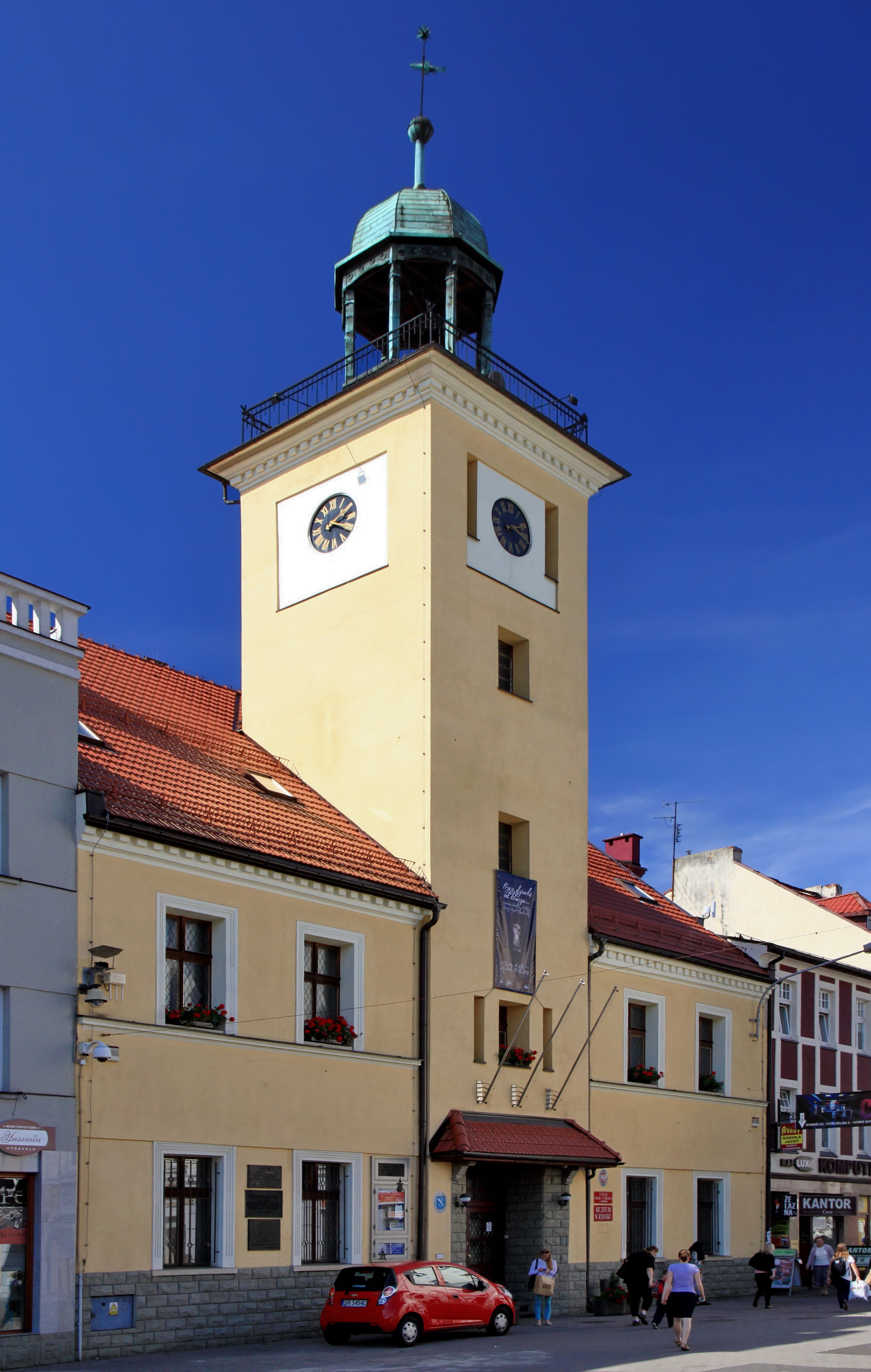
Old City Hall, now a museum

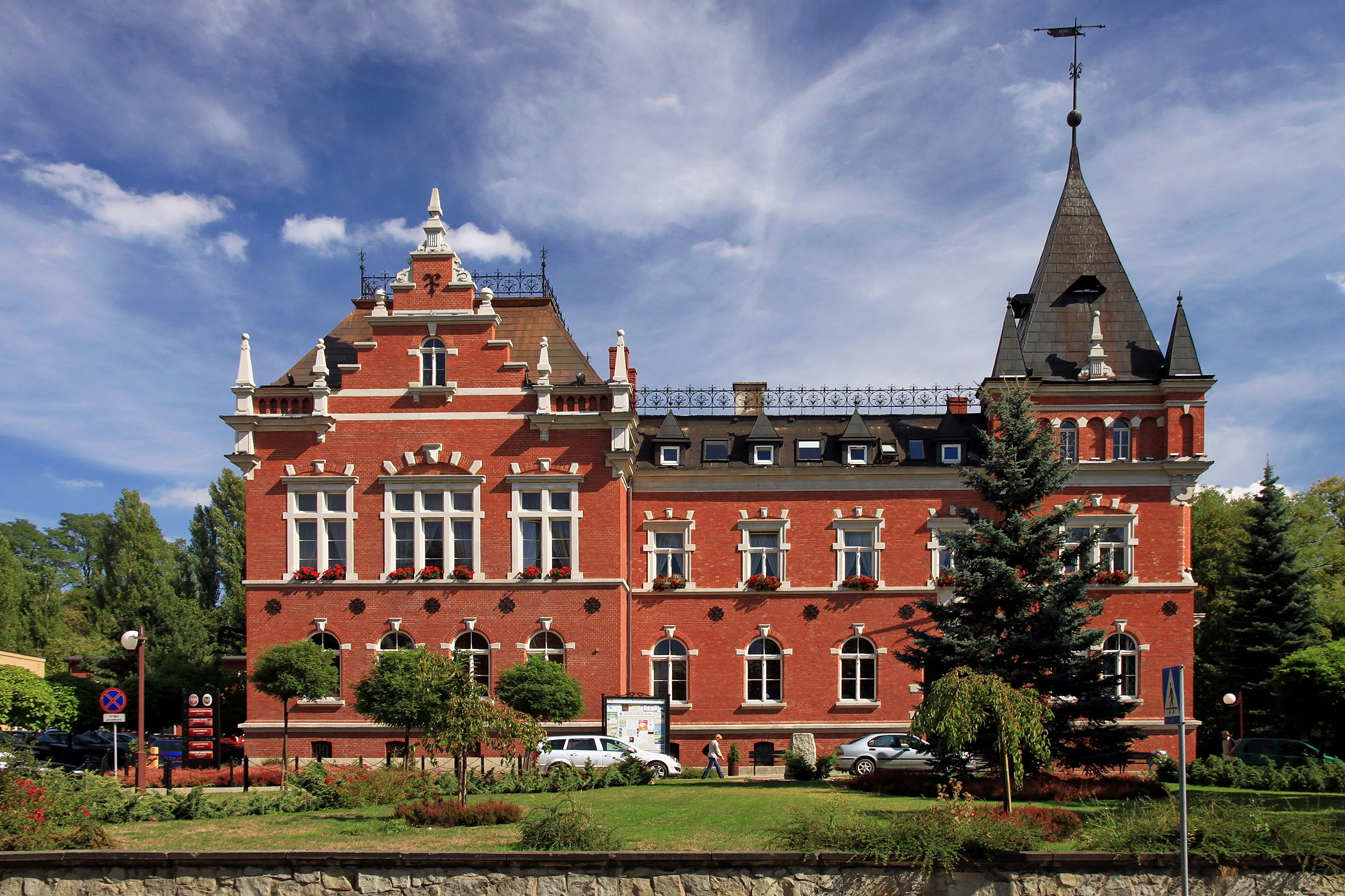
County Office

In contrast to the central part of the Upper Silesian Industry Area a short distance to the north, Rybnik enjoys the reputation of a "green" city having a relatively clean environment. While the city is not a centre of tourism, it does have various interesting sights and opportunities for recreation. To the north-east of the built-up area, there is a reservoir (Zalew Rybnicki) on the river Ruda, which serves as a cooling water source for the power station. Surrounded by forests, it offers swimming, fishing, sailing and surfing opportunities, and due to the power station's waste heat it is warm enough all year to be a habitat for grass carps. The Beskidy Mountains, a popular recreational area, also for skiing, are within a 1–2 hour drive.

Sights worth visiting:

- the neo-Gothic basilica of St. Anthony (Bazylika św. Antoniego)
- the building of the former district authority (1887)
- the neo-classical new town hall (1928)
- the neo-classical old town hall with clock-tower, today housing the registry office and the museum of local history
- the Church of St. Catherine (Kościół św. Katarzyny) (1534)
- the Church of St. Lawrence (Kościół św. Wawrzyńca) (1717)
- a late Baroque estate house (1736)
- a Piast castle from the early 13th century, completely redesigned in the 18th century

== Sports ==
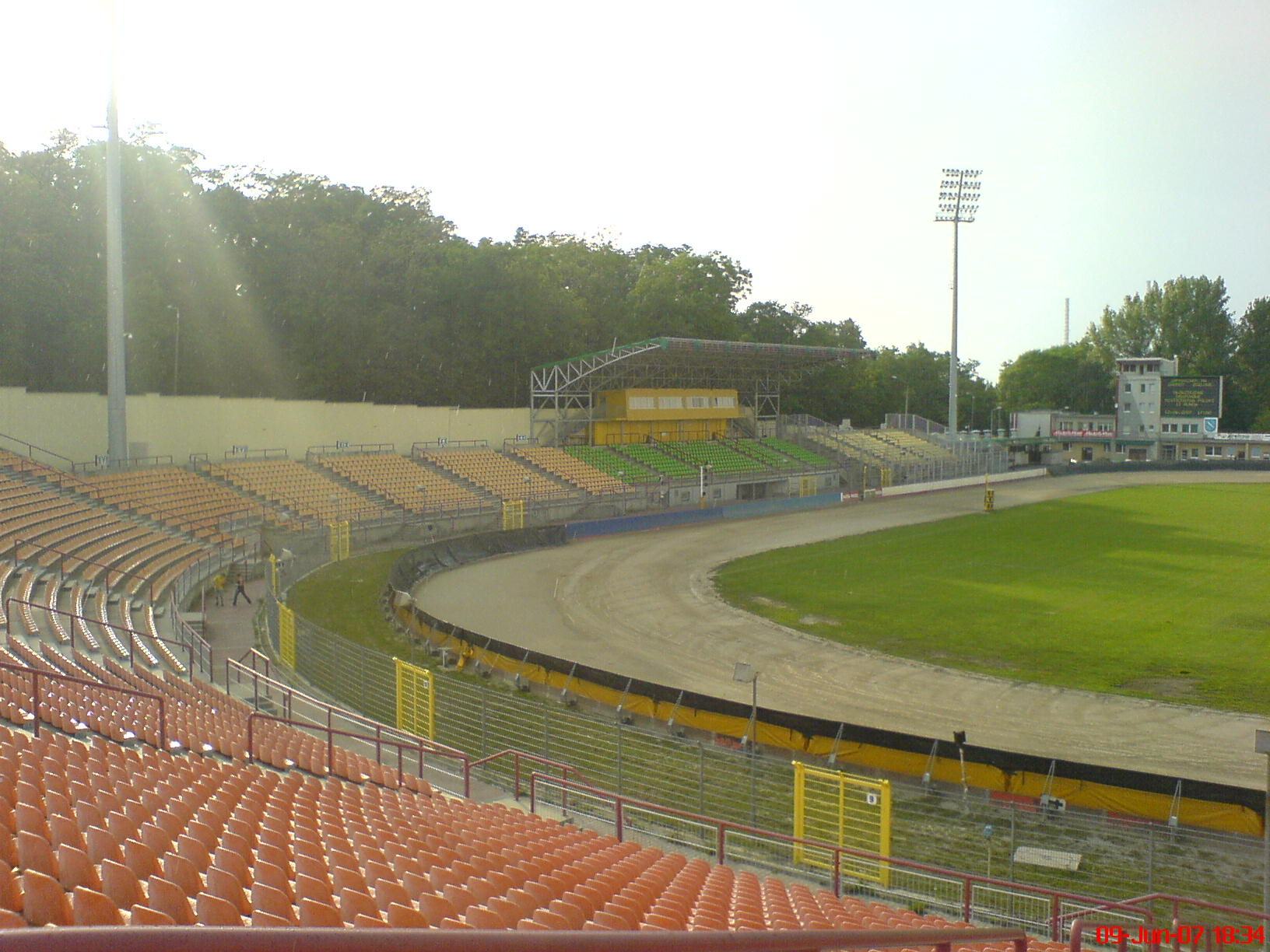
Municipal Stadium, home venue of both ROW Rybnik speedway team and ROW 1964 Rybnik football team

In 2006, the 8th European Glider Aerobatic Championships took place in Rybnik.

The aeroclub of Rybnik is very successful in national and international glider aerobatic competitions: Jerzy Makula won the European Glider Aerobatic Championships two times and the World Glider Aerobatic Championships six times. Other current or former members of the Polish national glider aerobatics team from Aeroklub ROW are Małgorzata Margańska, Krzysztof Brzikalik, Lucjan Fizia, Stanisław Makula and Ireneusz Boczkowski.

=== Teams from Rybnik ===
- ROW Rybnik – multi-sports club
- KS ROW Rybnik - speedway
- Thunders Rybnik – American football
- KS Silesia Rybnik – baseball

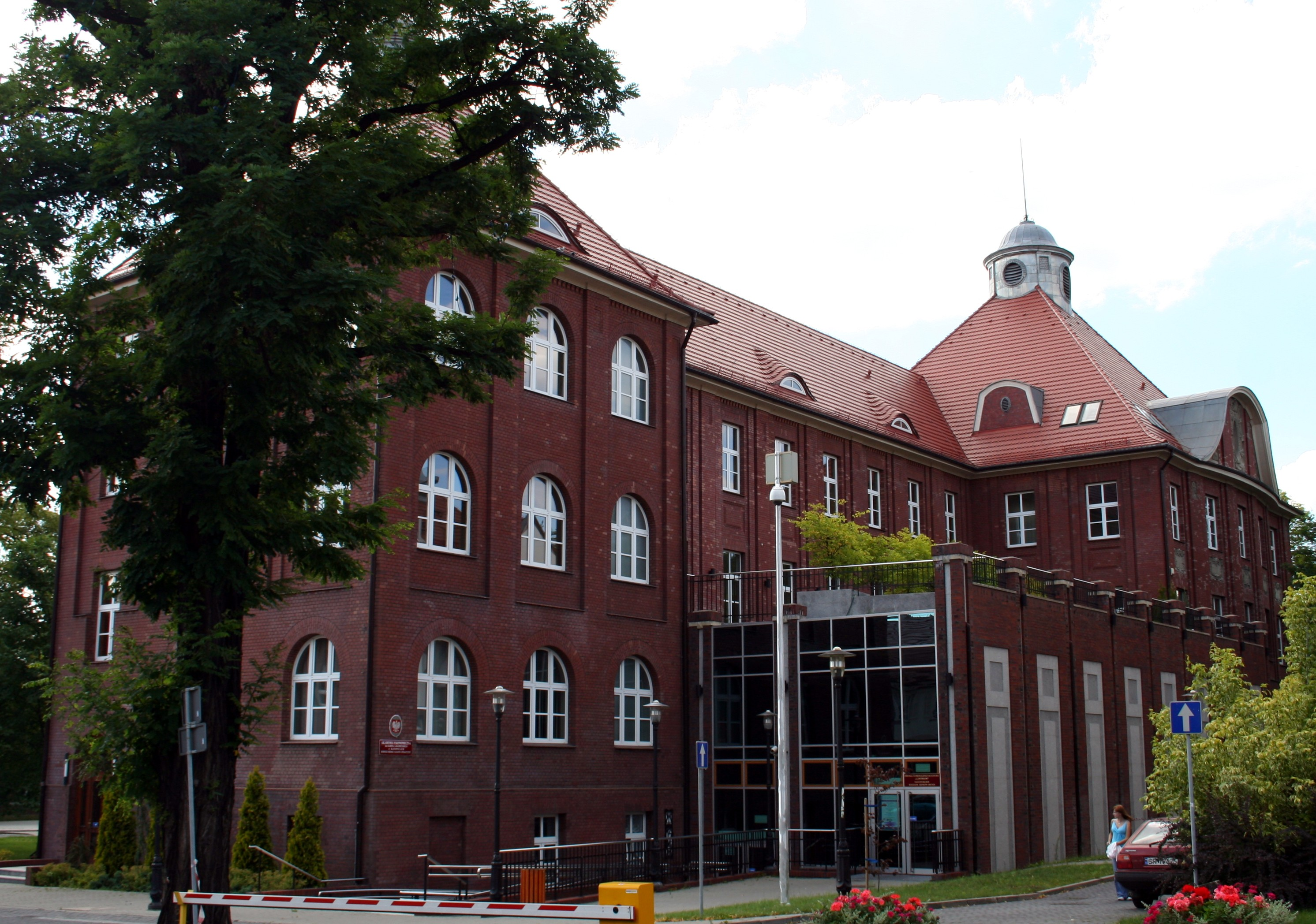
University of Economics Branch in Rybnik

== Climate ==
Rybnik has a humid continental climate (Köppen Dfb).

Climate data for Rybnik (1971–2000 normals, extremes 1981–2000)
Month	Jan	Feb	Mar	Apr	May	Jun	Jul	Aug	Sep	Oct	Nov	Dec	Year
Record high °C (°F)	16.0 (60.8)	17.5 (63.5)	22.1 (71.8)	27.3 (81.1)	31.9 (89.4)	35.3 (95.5)	36.0 (96.8)	37.0 (98.6)	29.5 (85.1)	25.6 (78.1)	19.8 (67.6)	17.6 (63.7)	37.0 (98.6)
Mean maximum °C (°F)	9.3 (48.7)	10.8 (51.4)	17.0 (62.6)	23.2 (73.8)	27.3 (81.1)	30.3 (86.5)	31.6 (88.9)	31.8 (89.2)	26.3 (79.3)	23.3 (73.9)	14.7 (58.5)	10.2 (50.4)	33.0 (91.4)
Mean daily maximum °C (°F)	1.6 (34.9)	3.2 (37.8)	7.8 (46.0)	14.1 (57.4)	19.6 (67.3)	21.9 (71.4)	24.3 (75.7)	24.1 (75.4)	19.0 (66.2)	13.9 (57.0)	6.5 (43.7)	2.3 (36.1)	13.2 (55.7)
Daily mean °C (°F)	−1.3 (29.7)	−0.3 (31.5)	3.5 (38.3)	8.7 (47.7)	14.2 (57.6)	16.9 (62.4)	18.9 (66.0)	18.4 (65.1)	13.9 (57.0)	9.3 (48.7)	3.4 (38.1)	−0.1 (31.8)	8.8 (47.8)
Mean daily minimum °C (°F)	−3.7 (25.3)	−3.1 (26.4)	0.1 (32.2)	3.8 (38.8)	8.8 (47.8)	11.8 (53.2)	13.5 (56.3)	13.2 (55.8)	9.7 (49.5)	5.7 (42.3)	0.9 (33.6)	−2.4 (27.7)	4.9 (40.7)
Mean minimum °C (°F)	−13.3 (8.1)	−12.3 (9.9)	−6.8 (19.8)	−2.8 (27.0)	2.6 (36.7)	5.7 (42.3)	8.4 (47.1)	7.5 (45.5)	3.2 (37.8)	−2.3 (27.9)	−6.8 (19.8)	−12.8 (9.0)	−17.3 (0.9)
Record low °C (°F)	−24.8 (−12.6)	−23.8 (−10.8)	−15.6 (3.9)	−5.9 (21.4)	−1.3 (29.7)	2.5 (36.5)	6.1 (43.0)	3.9 (39.0)	−0.6 (30.9)	−6.9 (19.6)	−15.5 (4.1)	−24.5 (−12.1)	−24.8 (−12.6)
Average precipitation mm (inches)	39.6 (1.56)	36.9 (1.45)	43.9 (1.73)	56.3 (2.22)	75.9 (2.99)	87.4 (3.44)	99.1 (3.90)	82.5 (3.25)	73.5 (2.89)	52.2 (2.06)	51.6 (2.03)	46.9 (1.85)	745.8 (29.36)
Average precipitation days (≥ 0.1 mm)	13.9	13.1	14.0	13.4	14.3	15.7	14.9	13.1	13.3	12.9	15.1	15.9	169.6
Average relative humidity (%)	81.7	78.7	75.0	70.2	70.9	74.1	72.6	74.7	81.1	81.6	84.0	85.1	77.5
Average dew point °C (°F)	−3 (27)	−3 (27)	−1 (30)	3 (37)	8 (46)	11 (52)	13 (55)	13 (55)	10 (50)	6 (43)	2 (36)	−2 (28)	5 (41)
Source 1: Meteomodel.pl
Source 2: Time and Date (dewpoints, 2005-2015)

== Notable people ==
- Otto Landsberg (1869–1957), German politician
- Hermann Boehm (1884–1972) Kriegsmarine Admiral
- Lidia Grychtołówna (born 1928), pianist
- Henryk Górecki (1933–2010), composer of classical music
- Adam Makowicz (born 1940), jazz pianist
- Piotr Paleczny (born 1946), pianist
- Olek Krupa (born 1947), actor
- Tomasz Zdebel (born 1973), Polish-German footballer
- Jerzy Dudek (born 1973), footballer
- Thomas Godoj (born 1978), Polish-German singer, winner of 2008 Deutschland sucht den Superstar
- Krzysztof Bodziony (born 1985), footballer
- Ewa Sonnet (born 1985), model and singer
- Bartosz Slisz (born 1999), footballer

== Twin towns – sister cities ==
Rybnik is twinned with:

- Antrim and Newtownabbey, Northern Ireland, United Kingdom (2003)
- Bar, Ukraine (2007)
- Dorsten, Germany (1994)
- Eurasburg, Germany (2001)
- Ivano-Frankivsk, Ukraine (2001)
- Karviná, Czech Republic (2004)
- Labin, Croatia (2019)
- Larissa, Greece (2003)
- Liévin, France (2000)
- Mazamet, France (1993)
- Saint-Vallier, France (1961)
- Topoľčany, Slovakia (2008)
- Vilnius District Municipality, Lithuania (2000)
