= Golejów, Rybnik =

Golejów
- Rybnik District
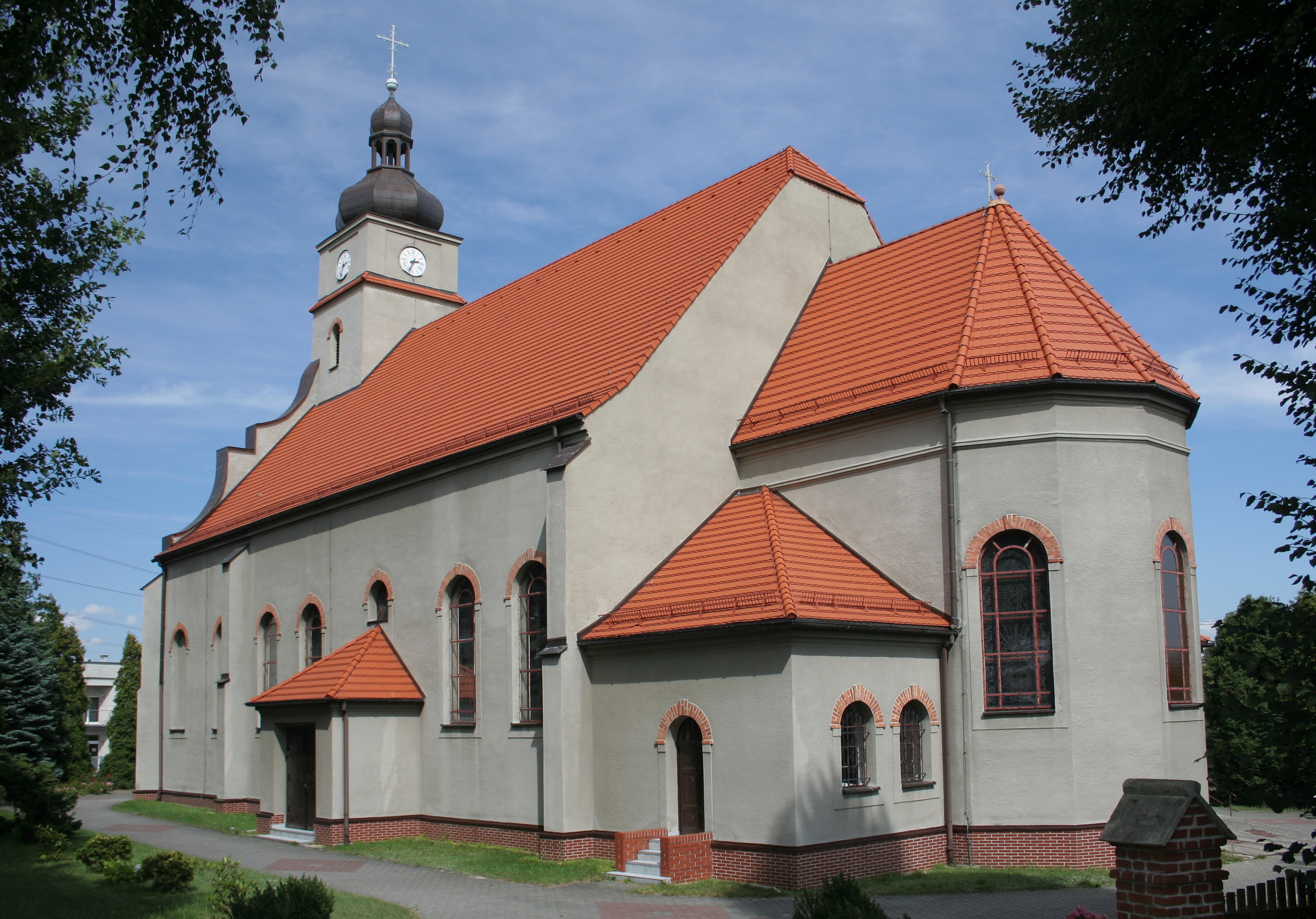
- Christ the King church (built in 1927)

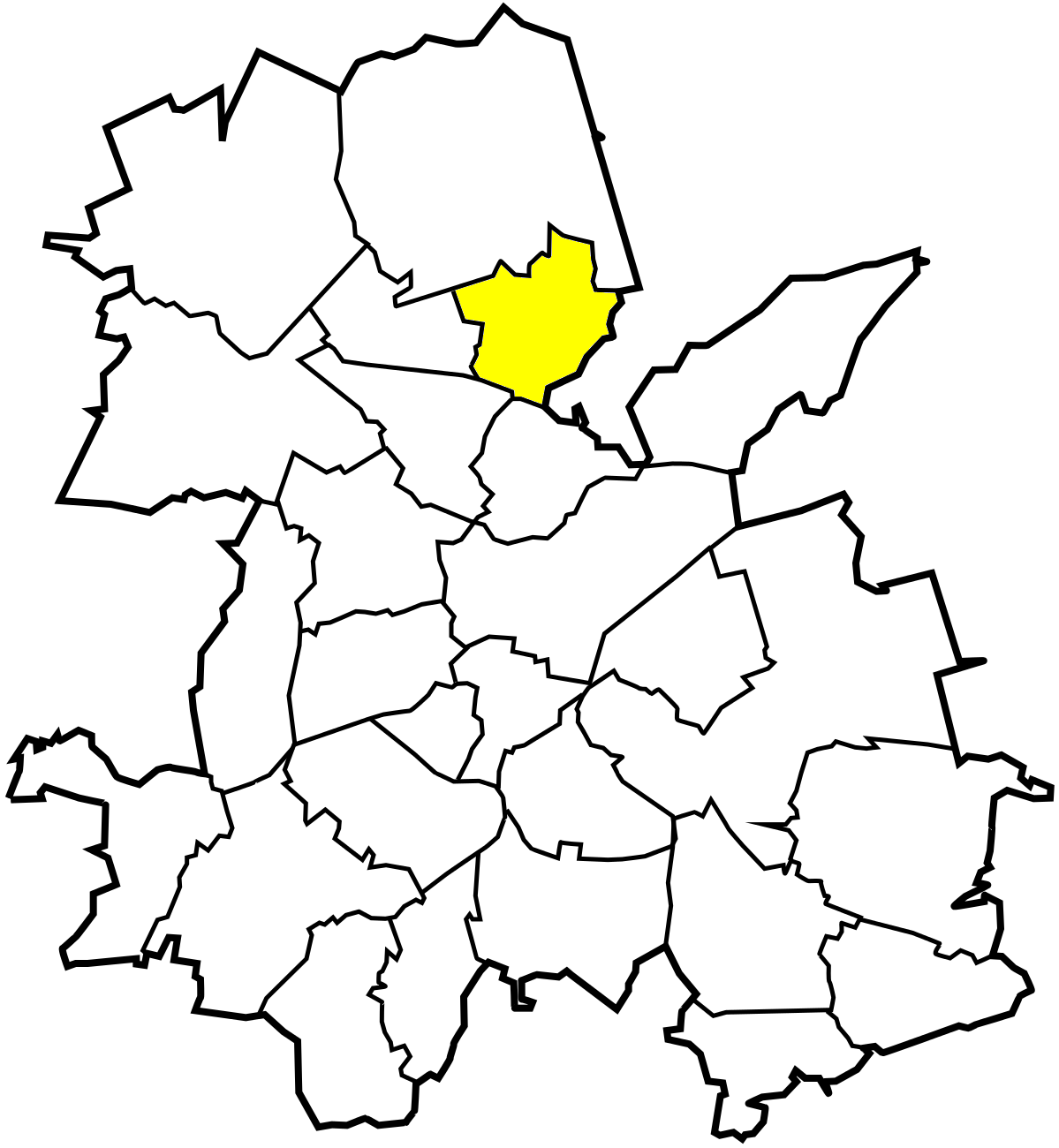
- Location of Golejów within Rybnik
- Coordinates: 50.1446°N 18.5485°E
- Country: Poland
- Voivodeship: Silesian
- County/City: Rybnik

Population (2013)
  - Total: 2,300
- Time zone: UTC+1 (CET)
  - Summer (DST): UTC+2 (CEST)
- Area code: (+48) 032

Golejów (German: Golleow) is a district of Rybnik, Silesian Voivodeship, southern Poland. In the late 2013 it had about 2,300 inhabitants.

== History ==
The village probably existed in the 13th century. Politically it belonged initially to the Duchy of Opole and Racibórz, within feudally fragmentated Poland, ruled by a local branch of the Silesian Piast dynasty. In 1327 the Upper Silesian duchies became a fee of the Kingdom of Bohemia, which after 1526 became part of the Habsburg monarchy. After Silesian Wars it became a part of the Kingdom of Prussia.

After World War I in the Upper Silesia plebiscite 488 out of 565 voters in Golejów voted in favour of joining Poland, against 134 opting for staying in Germany. In 1922 it became a part of Silesian Voivodeship, Second Polish Republic. They were then annexed by Nazi Germany at the beginning of World War II. After the war it was restored to Poland.

In years 1973-1977 it belonged to gmina Ochojec. On May 27, 1975 it was amalgamated with Rybnik.
