= Niedobczyce =

- Rybnik District
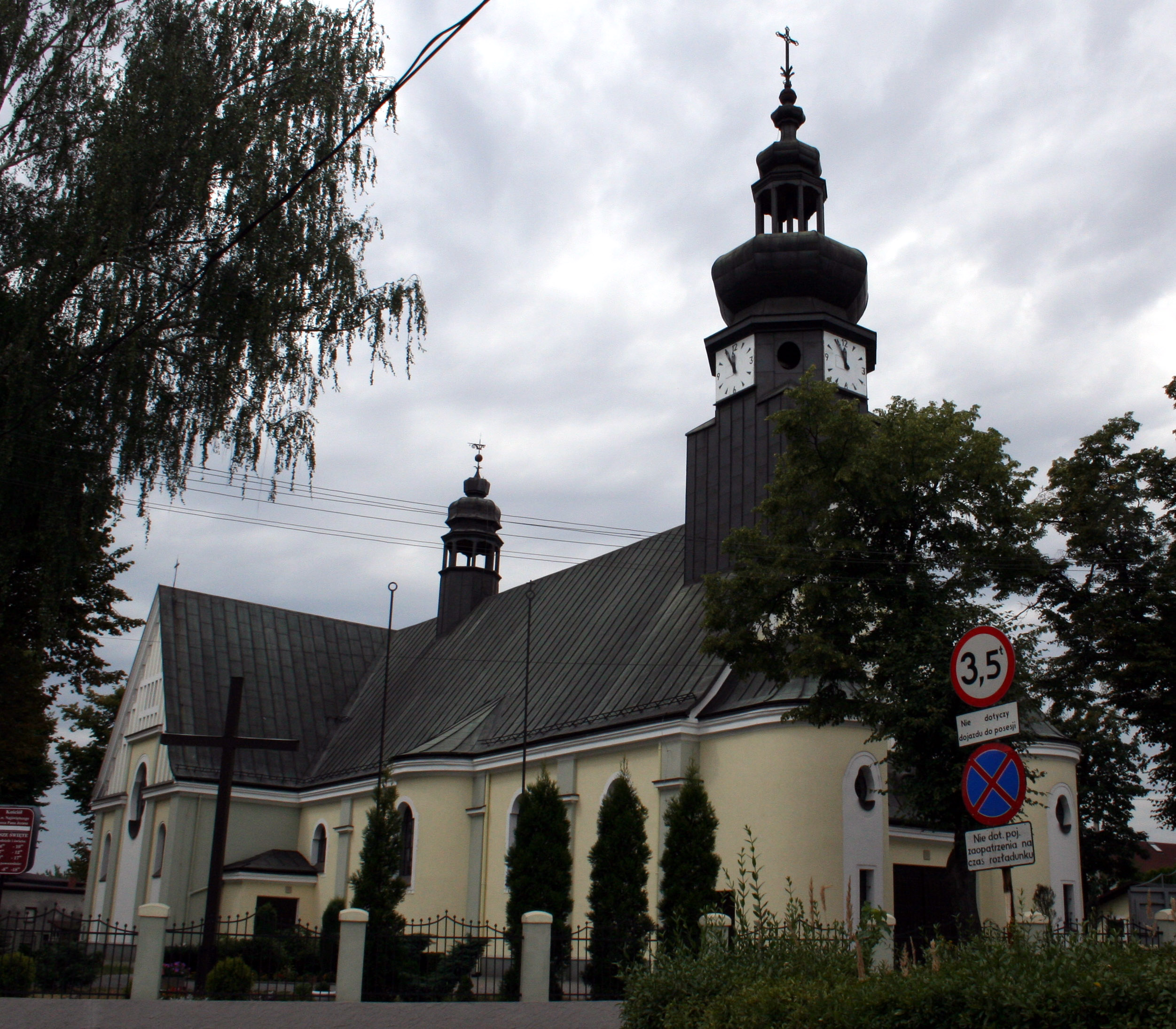
- Sacred Heart church

- Coat of arms

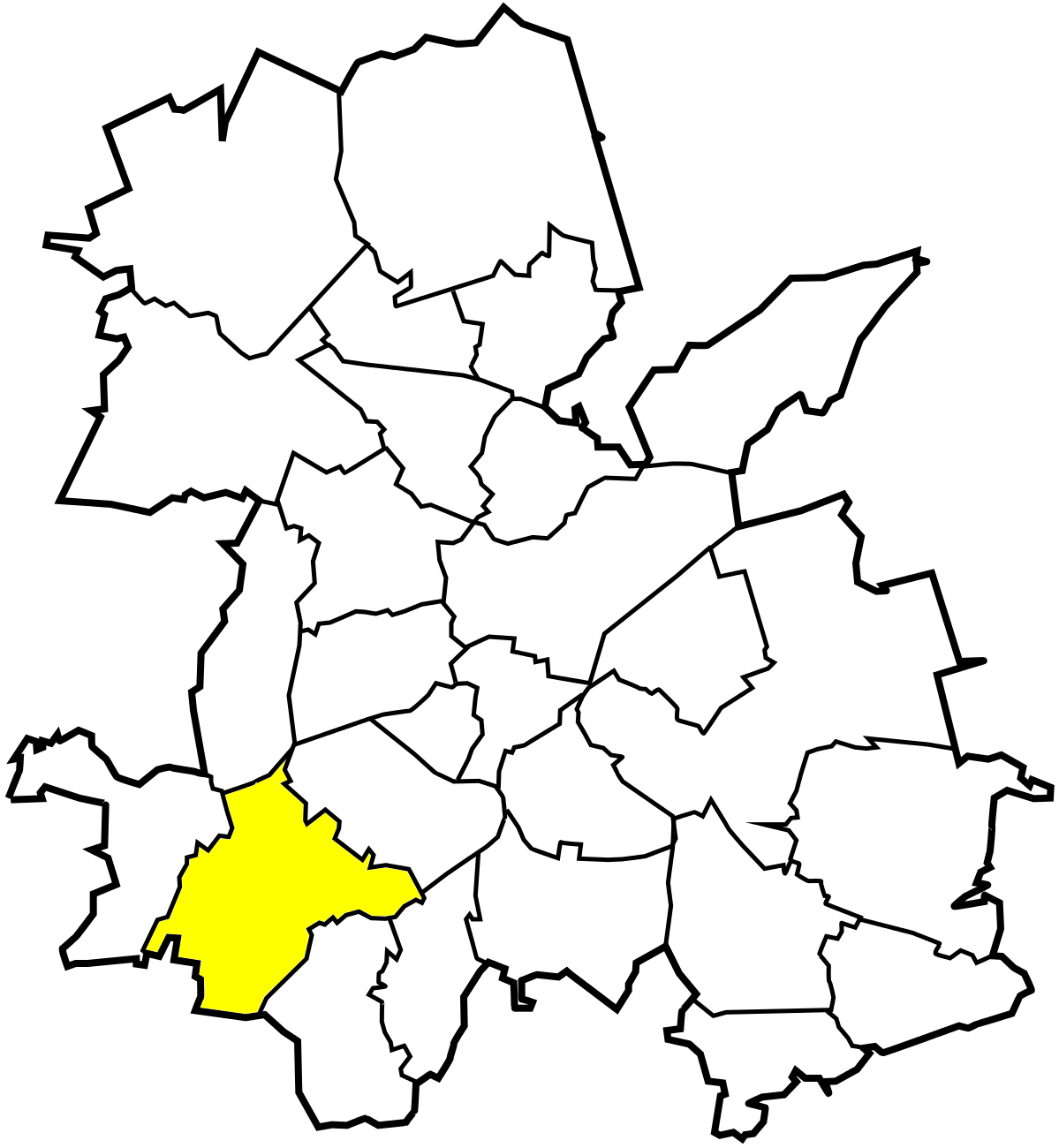
- Location of Niedobczyce within Rybnik
- Coordinates: 50°04′00″N 18°29′39″E
- Country: Poland
- Voivodeship: Silesian
- County/City: Rybnik
- First mentioned: 1228
- Within city limits: 1975

Population (2024)
  - Total: 10 846
- Time zone: UTC+1 (CET)
  - Summer (DST): UTC+2 (CEST)
- Area code: (+48) 032

Niedobczyce is a district of Rybnik, Silesian Voivodeship, southern Poland. Between 1955 and 1975, it was an independent town. On 31 December 2024, it had about 10,846 inhabitants.

== History ==
The village was first mentioned in 1228 as Nedobcici, when it was part of medieval Piast-ruled Poland.

In the 18th century, it was annexed by Prussia, and from 1871 it became part of the German Empire. As of 1861, it had a population of 694. After World War I in the Upper Silesia plebiscite 1,419 out of 1,816 voters in Niedobczyce voted in favour of rejoining Poland, against 395 opting for staying in Germany. In 1922 it became a part of Silesian Voivodeship, Second Polish Republic.

Following the German-Soviet invasion of Poland, which started World War II in September 1939, Niedobczyce was occupied by Germany until 1945. The local Polish police chief and three other policemen were murdered by the Russians in the Katyn massacre in 1940.

In years 1945-1954 it was a seat of a gmina. On November 13, 1954 it gained town rights. In 1955 Niewiadom was adjoined to the town. On May 27, 1975 it was amalgamated with Rybnik.

== Sport ==
- Rymer Niedobczyce, which in the late 1940s played for a year in the Ekstraklasa.

== People ==
- Damian Zimoń, Polish archbishop, born here in 1934;
