= Niewiadom =

- Rybnik District
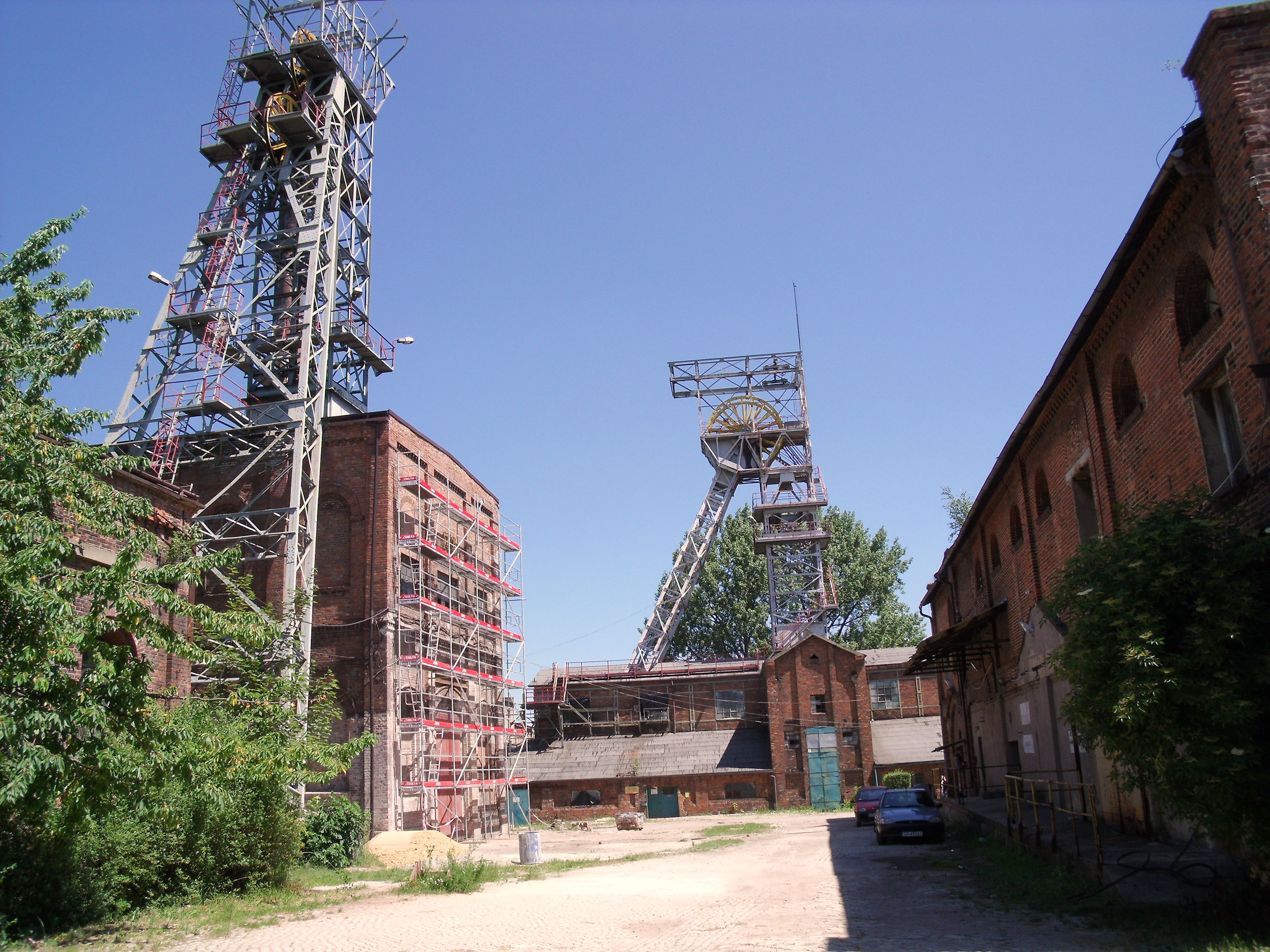
- Ignacy Coal Mine

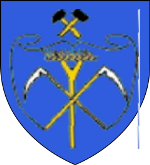
- Coat of arms

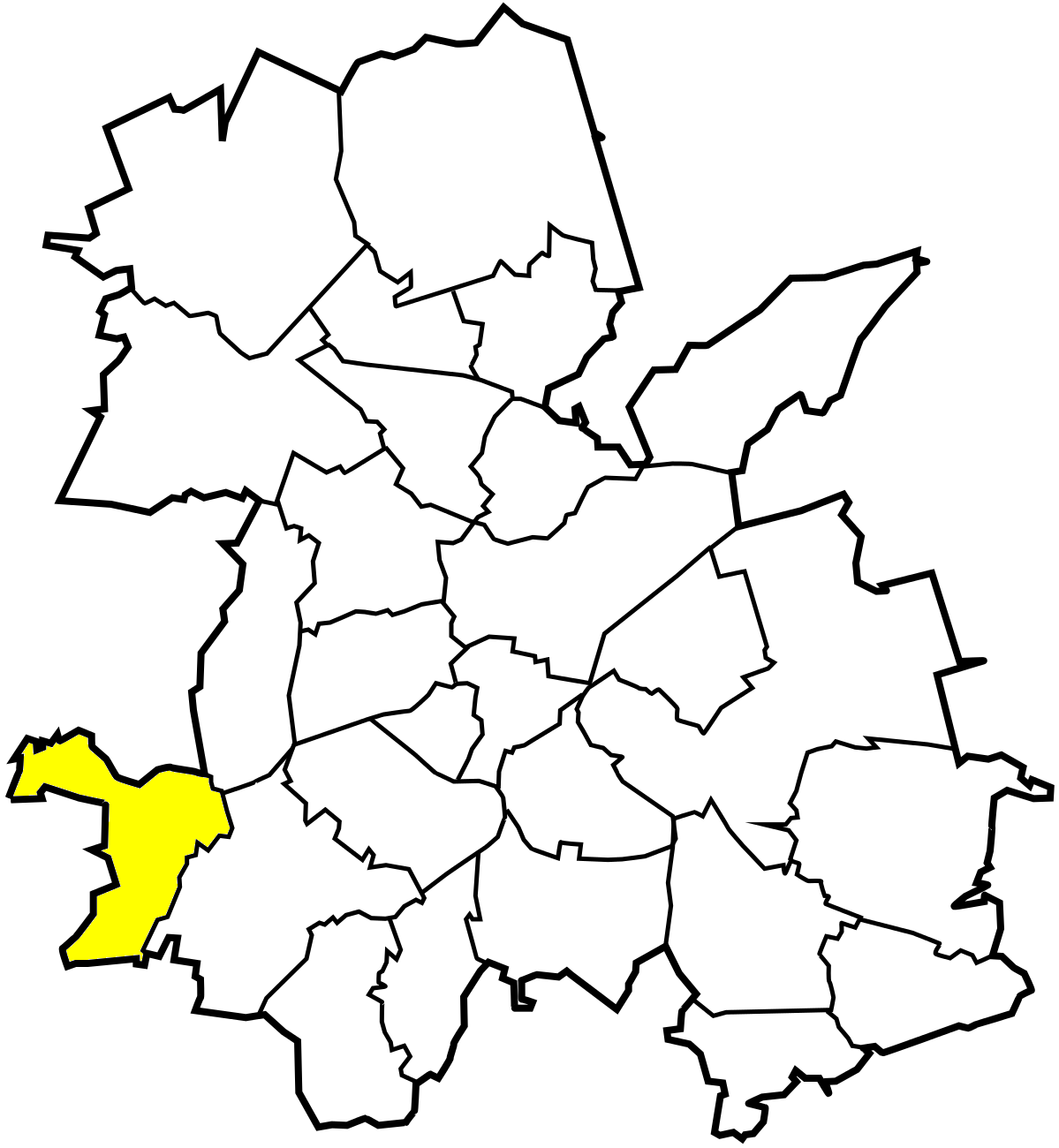
- Location of Niewiadom within Rybnik
- Coordinates: 50.076°N 18.470°E
- Country: Poland
- Voivodeship: Silesian
- County/City: Rybnik

Population (2013)
  - Total: 4,700
- Time zone: UTC+1 (CET)
  - Summer (DST): UTC+2 (CEST)
- Area code: (+48) 032

Niewiadom (German: Birkenau) is a district of Rybnik, Silesian Voivodeship, southern Poland. In the late 2013 it had about 4,700 inhabitants.

== History ==
The village was first mentioned as Noviedomie in the 14th century.

In 1792, on the border with Radlin, the Hoym (later Ignacy) coal mine was opened in Niewiadom.

In 1859, in the northern part, the Beatensglück (Polish: Szczęście Beaty, lit. 'The Happiness of Beth') coal mine was opened, closed in 1919.

After World War I in the Upper Silesia plebiscite 105 out of 169 voters in Niewiadom voted in favour of joining Poland, against 64 opting for staying in Germany. In 1922 it became a part of Silesian Voivodeship, Second Polish Republic. They were then annexed by Nazi Germany at the beginning of World War II. After the war it was restored to Poland.

In 1955 it became a part of Niedobczyce, which was on May 27, 1975 amalgamated with Rybnik.
