= Coat of arms of Rybnik =

Coat of Arms of Rybnik

The coat of arms of the city of Rybnik in Poland consists of a blue shield bearing a white pike rising diagonally between two floral patterns. The arms are an example of canting arms, since ryb means "fish". This coat was adopted by the Rybnik City Council on November 20, 2000.

A formal blazon in English is: Azure, a pike bendwise between two floral patterns of a water-nut, all argent.
