= Wielopole, Rybnik =

Wielopole
- Rybnik District
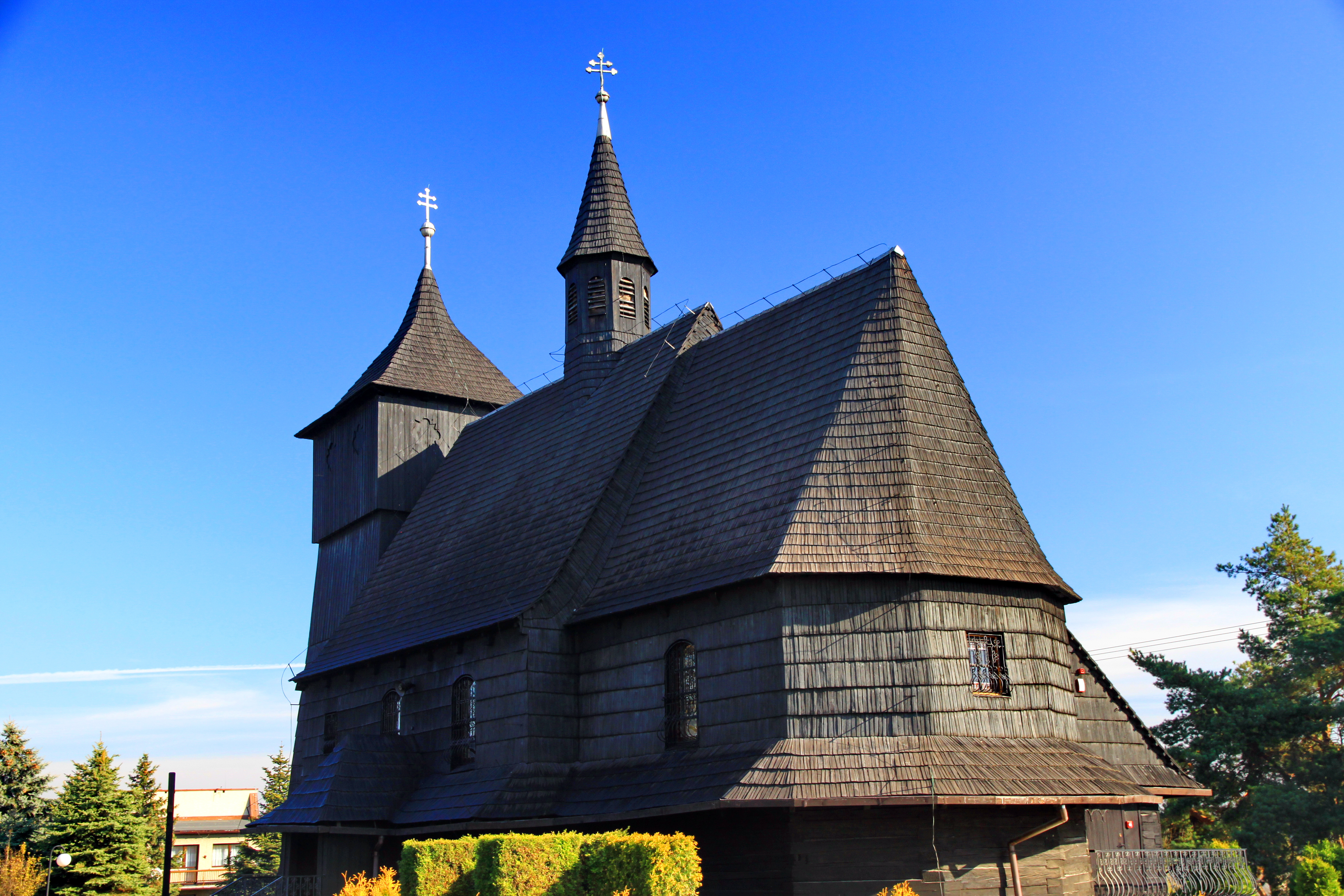
- Saint Catherine church

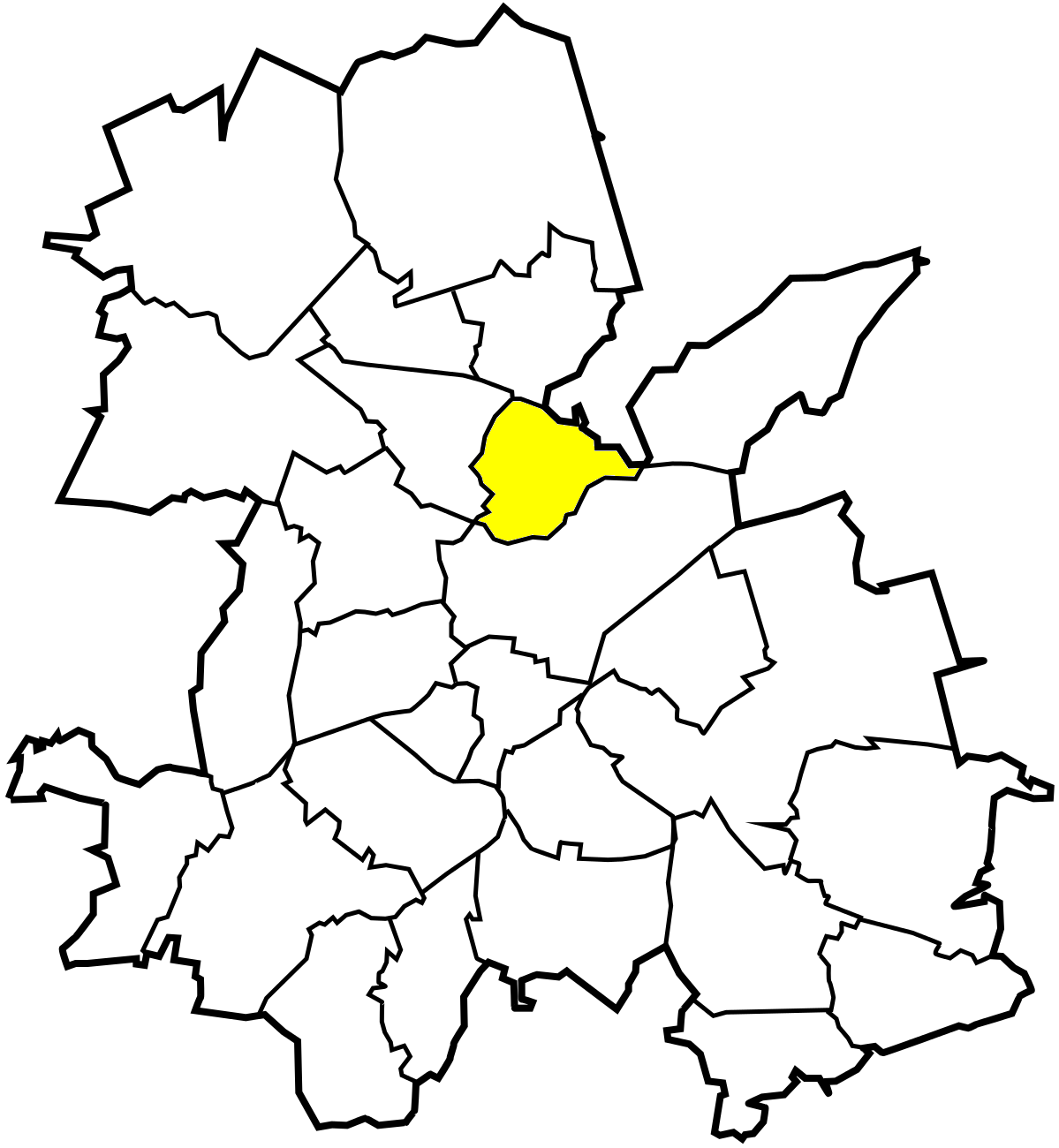
- Location of Wielopole within Rybnik
- Coordinates: 50°07′12.8″N 18°33′13.6″E
- Country: Poland
- Voivodeship: Silesian
- County/City: Rybnik

Population (2013)
  - Total: 1,900
- Time zone: UTC+1 (CET)
  - Summer (DST): UTC+2 (CEST)
- Area code: (+48) 032

Wielopole (German: Königlich Wielopole) is a district of Rybnik, Silesian Voivodeship, southern Poland. In the late 2013 it had about 1,900 inhabitants.

The biggest landmark in Wielopole is a wooden Saint Catherine church, built in 1534, rebuilt in 1676 and 1976.

== History ==
The village was first mentioned in 1311. Politically it belonged then to the Duchy of Racibórz, within feudally fragmentated Poland, ruled by a local branch of the Silesian Piast dynasty. In 1327 the Upper Silesian duchies became a fee of the Kingdom of Bohemia, which after 1526 became part of the Habsburg monarchy. After Silesian Wars it became a part of the Kingdom of Prussia.

After World War I in the Upper Silesia plebiscite 515 out of 615 voters in Wielopole voted in favour of joining Poland, against 99 opting for staying in Germany. In 1922 it became a part of Silesian Voivodeship, Second Polish Republic. They were then annexed by Nazi Germany at the beginning of World War II. After the war it was restored to Poland.

In years 1945-1954 it was a seat of gmina. With Orzepowice it was amalgamated with Rybnik in 1973.
