= Orzepowice =

- Rybnik District
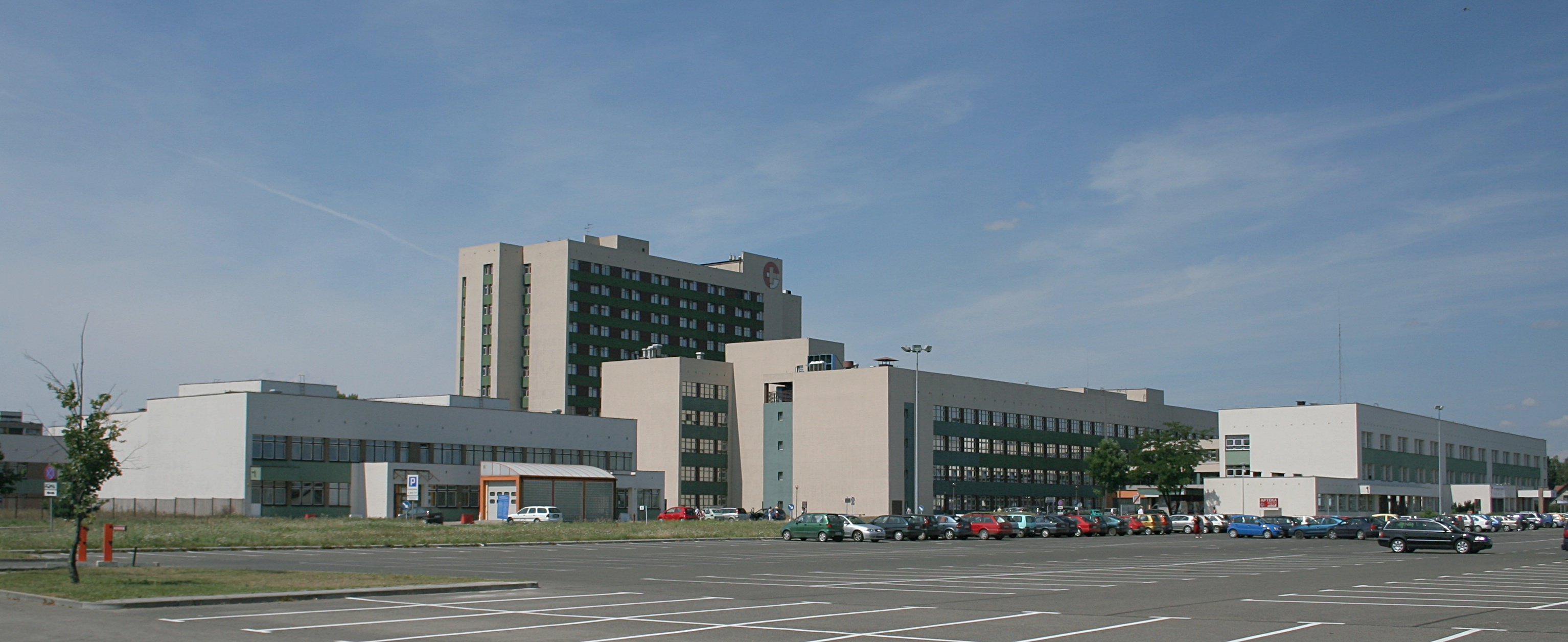
- Hospital

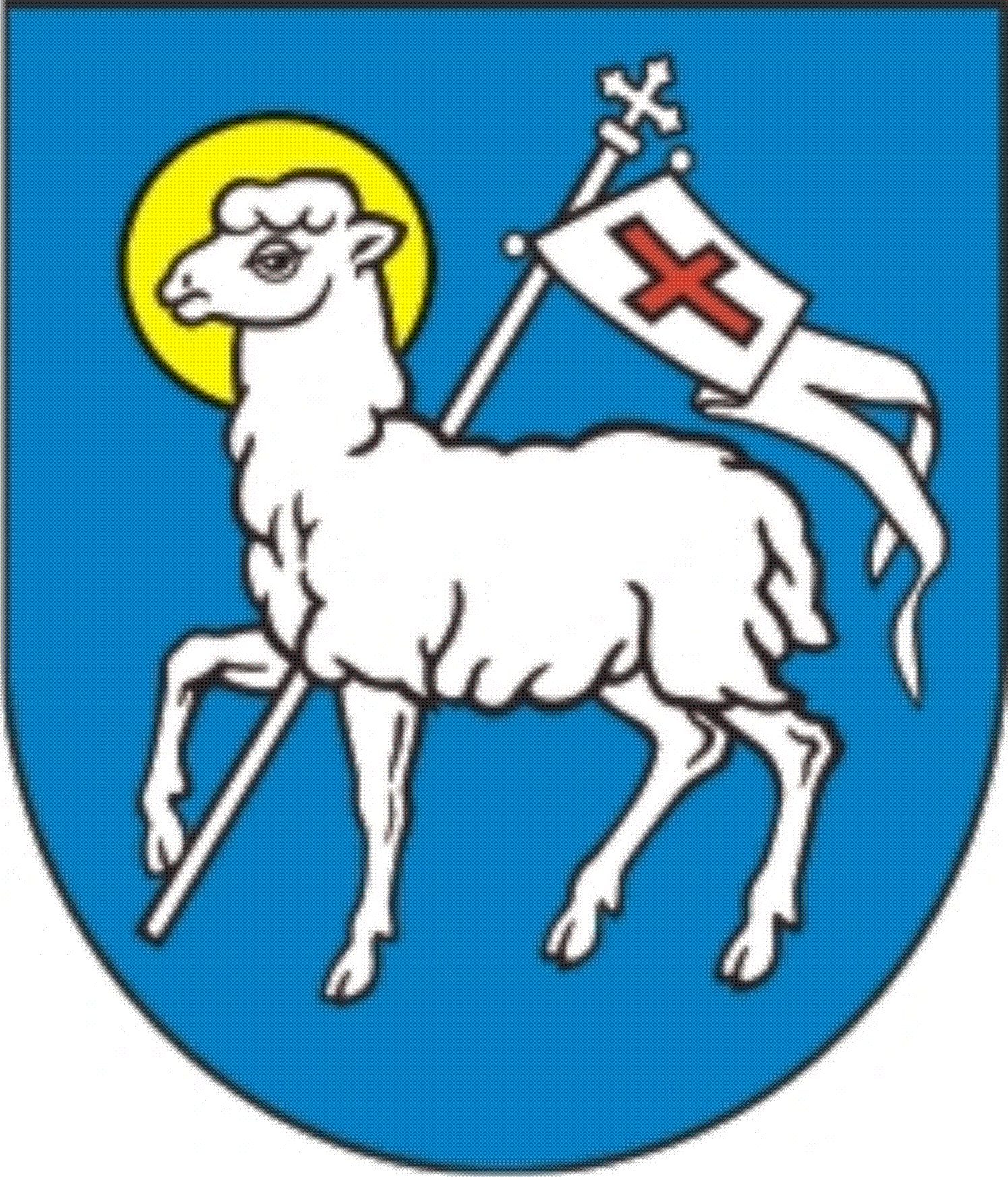
- Coat of arms

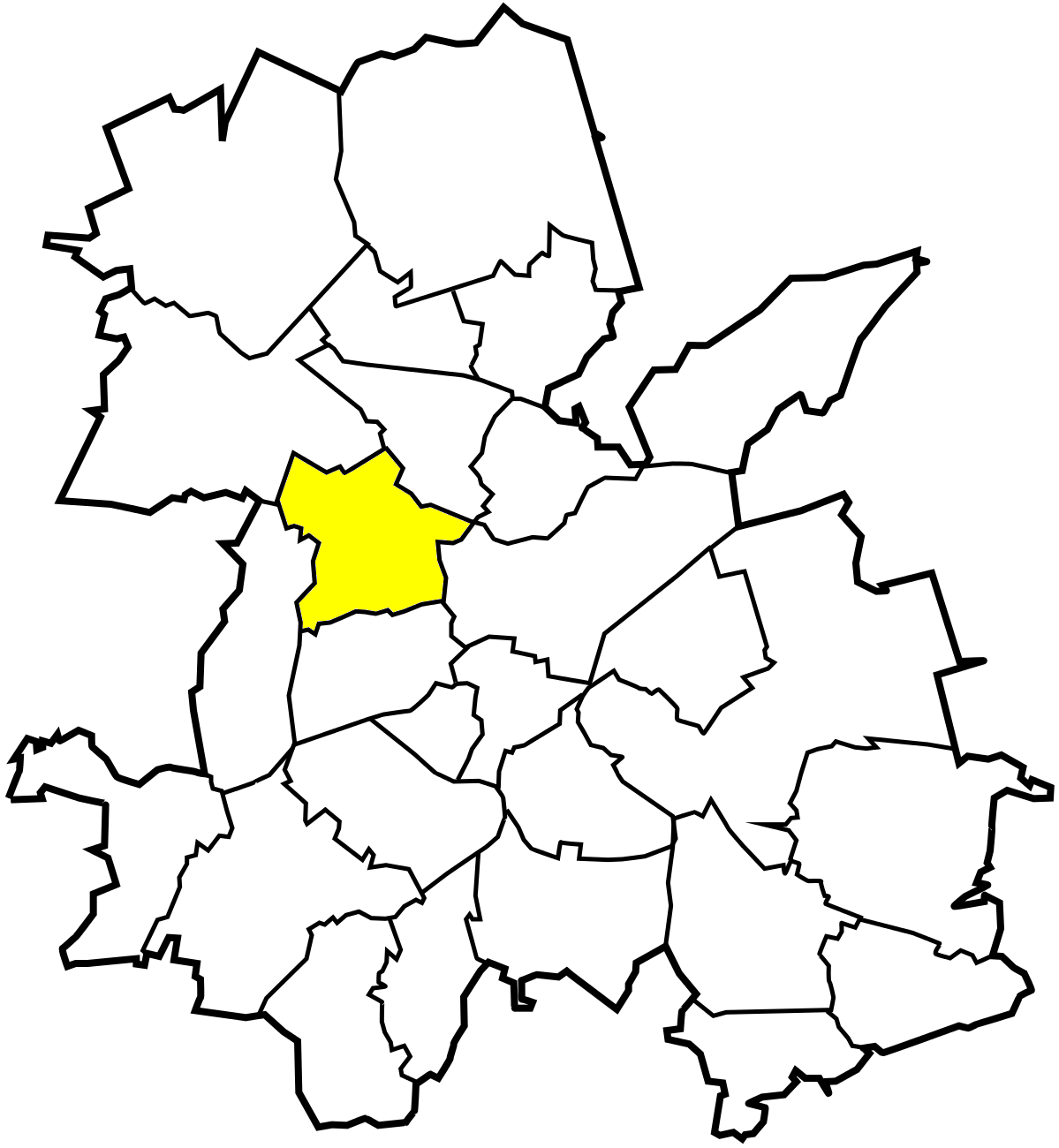
- Location of Orzepowice within Rybnik
- Coordinates: 50.116732°N 18.517367°E
- Country: Poland
- Voivodeship: Silesian
- County/City: Rybnik

Population (2013)
  - Total: 3,500
- Time zone: UTC+1 (CET)
  - Summer (DST): UTC+2 (CEST)
- Area code: (+48) 032

Orzepowice (German: Orzupowitz) is a district of Rybnik, Silesian Voivodeship, southern Poland. In the late 2013 it had about 3,500 inhabitants.

== History ==
After World War I in the Upper Silesia plebiscite 399 out of 462 voters in Orzepowice voted in favour of joining Poland, against 61 opting for staying in Germany. In 1922 it became a part of Silesian Voivodeship, Second Polish Republic. They were then annexed by Nazi Germany at the beginning of World War II. After the war it was restored to Poland.

It was with Wielopole amalgamated with Rybnik in 1973.
