= Kamień, Rybnik =

Kamień
- Rybnik District
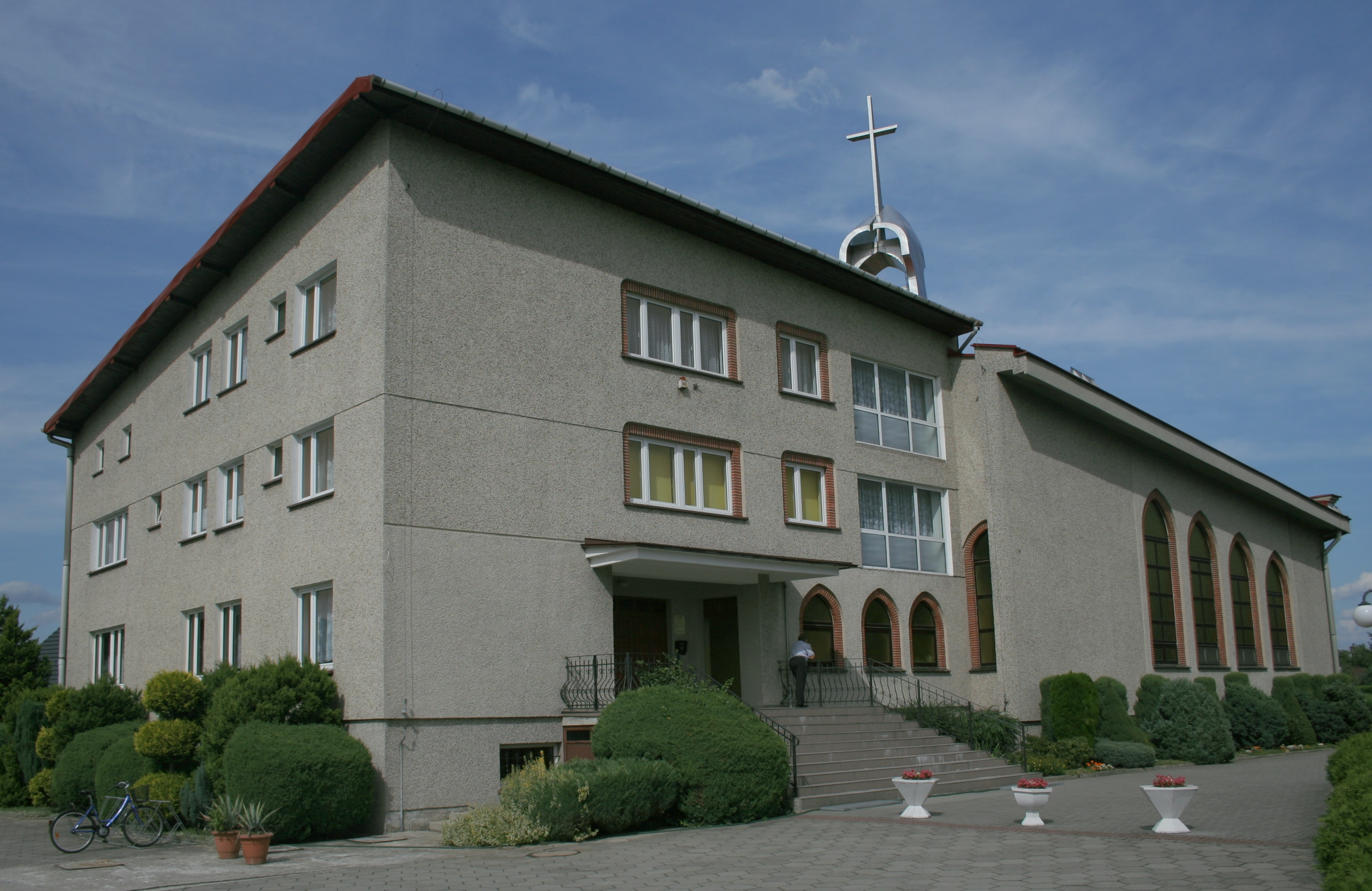
- Saint Albert church

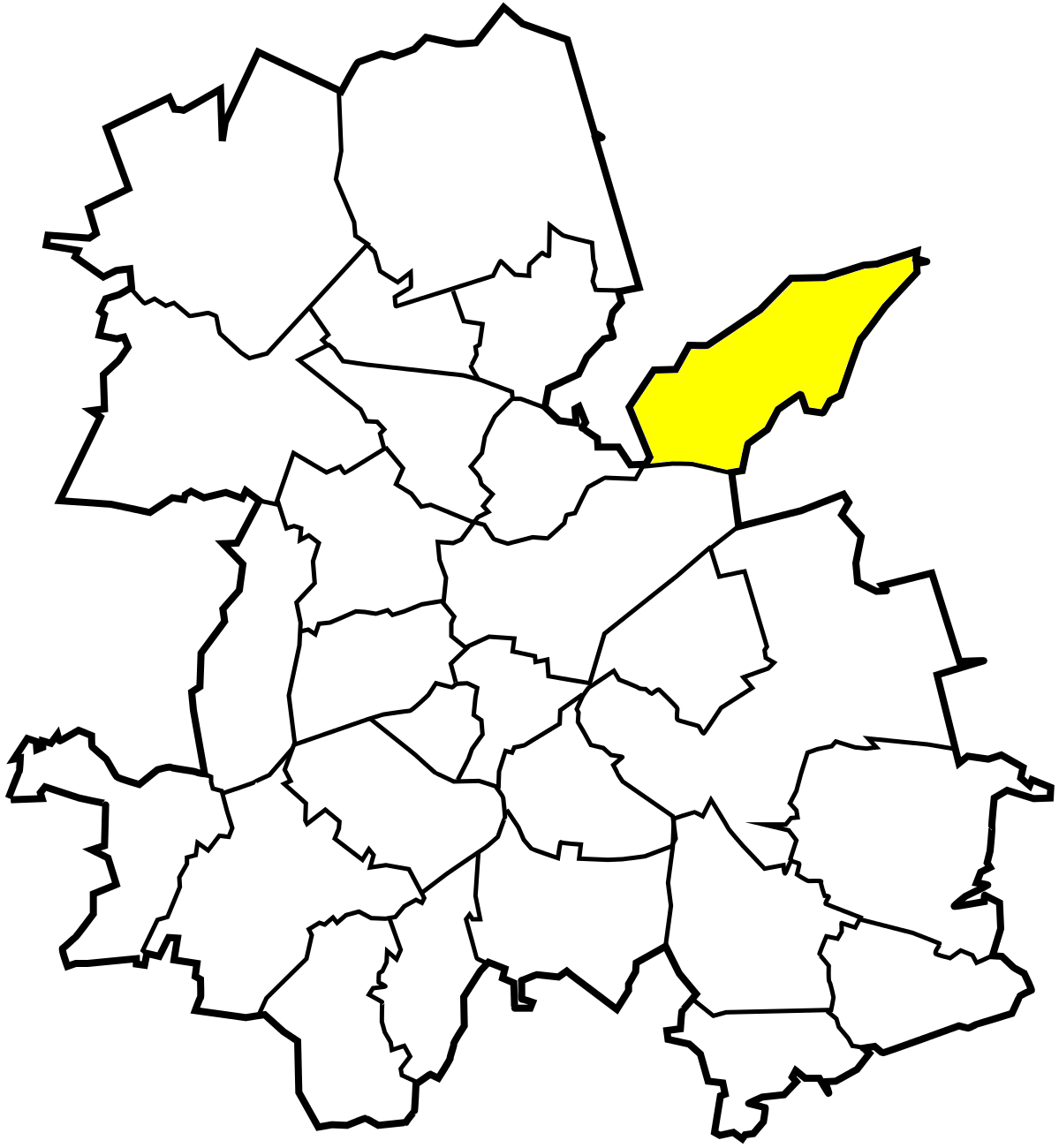
- Location of Kamień within Rybnik
- Coordinates: 50°08′18″N 18°36′36″E
- Country: Poland
- Voivodeship: Silesian
- County/City: Rybnik

Population (2013)
  - Total: 4,300
- Time zone: UTC+1 (CET)
  - Summer (DST): UTC+2 (CEST)
- Area code: (+48) 032

Kamień (German: Stein) is a district of Rybnik, Silesian Voivodeship, southern Poland. In the late 2013 it had about 4,300 inhabitants.

== History ==
After World War I in the Upper Silesia plebiscite 348 out of 412 voters in Kamień voted in favour of joining Poland, against 62 opting for staying in Germany. In 1922 it became a part of Silesian Voivodeship, Second Polish Republic. They were then annexed by Nazi Germany at the beginning of World War II. After the war it was restored to Poland.

In years 1973-1977 it belonged to gmina Ochojec. On May 27, 1975, it was amalgamated with Rybnik.

The village became a seat of a Catholic parish in 1989, served by a Saint Albert church, built in years 1990–1994.
