= Kamyen, Minsk region =

Village in Minsk Region, Belarus

Kamyen Камень
- Village
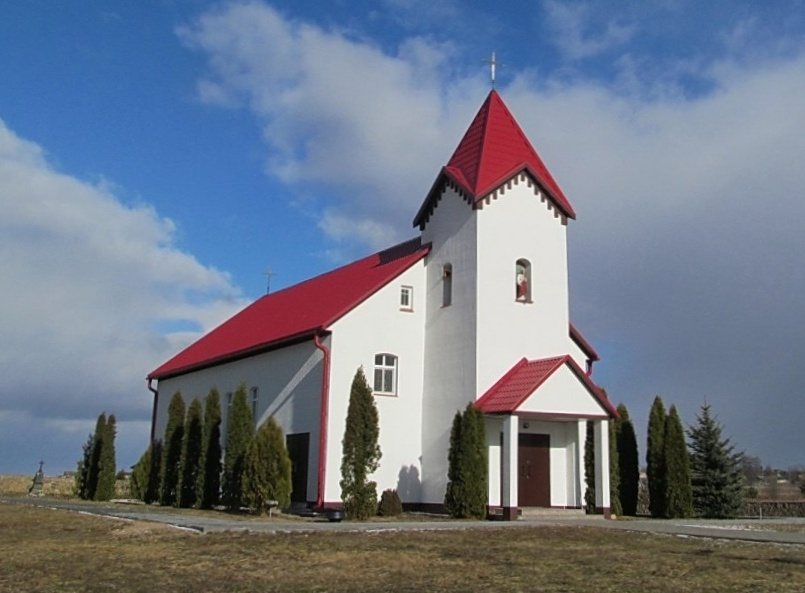
- Church of Saints Peter and Paul in Kamyen

- Location within Belarus
- Coordinates: 53°51′N 26°39′E
- Country: Belarus
- Region: Minsk Region
- District: Valozhyn District
- Time zone: UTC+3 (MSK)

Kamyen (Belarusian: Камень, romanized: Kamień; Russian: Камень; Polish: Kamień) is a village in Valozhyn District, Minsk Region, in central Belarus.

== History ==
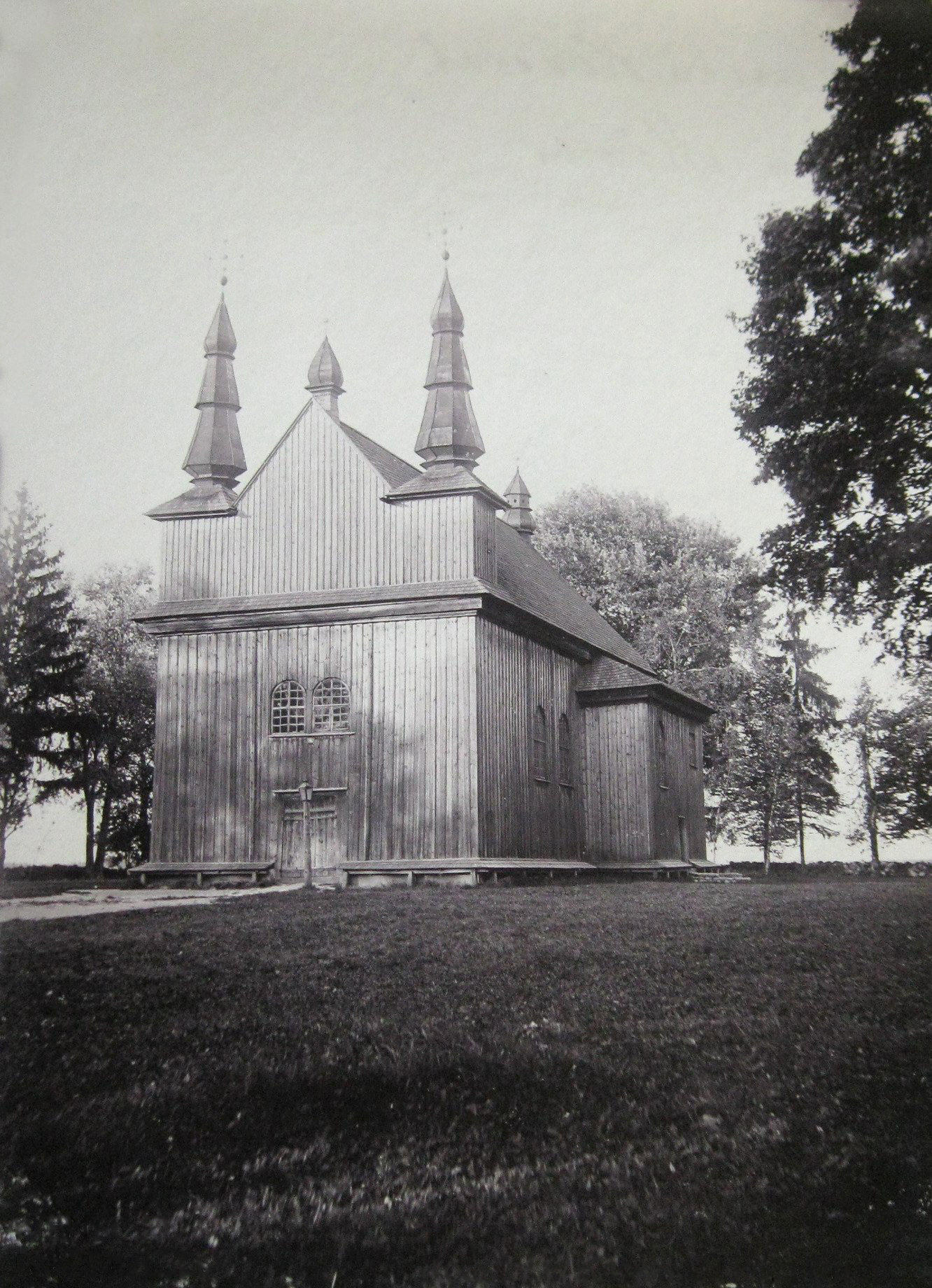
Old church of Saints Peter and Paul

It was a possession of the Zabrzeziński and Dołmat Isajkowski noble families, administrativaly located in the Minsk County in the Minsk Voivodeship of the Polish–Lithuanian Commonwealth.

In the interbellum, Kamień was a town administratively located in the Nowogródek County in the Nowogródek Voivodeship of Poland. According to the 1921 Polish census, the population was 99.5% Polish and 0.5% Belarusian.

Following the invasion of Poland in September 1939, Kamień was first occupied by the Soviet Union until 1941, then by Nazi Germany until 1944. On 14–15 May 1944, it was the place of a clash between Polish and Soviet partisans, won by the Poles. In 1944, the settlement was re-occupied by the Soviet Union, which eventually annexed it from Poland in 1945.
