= Śródmieście, Rybnik =

Śródmieście
- Rybnik District
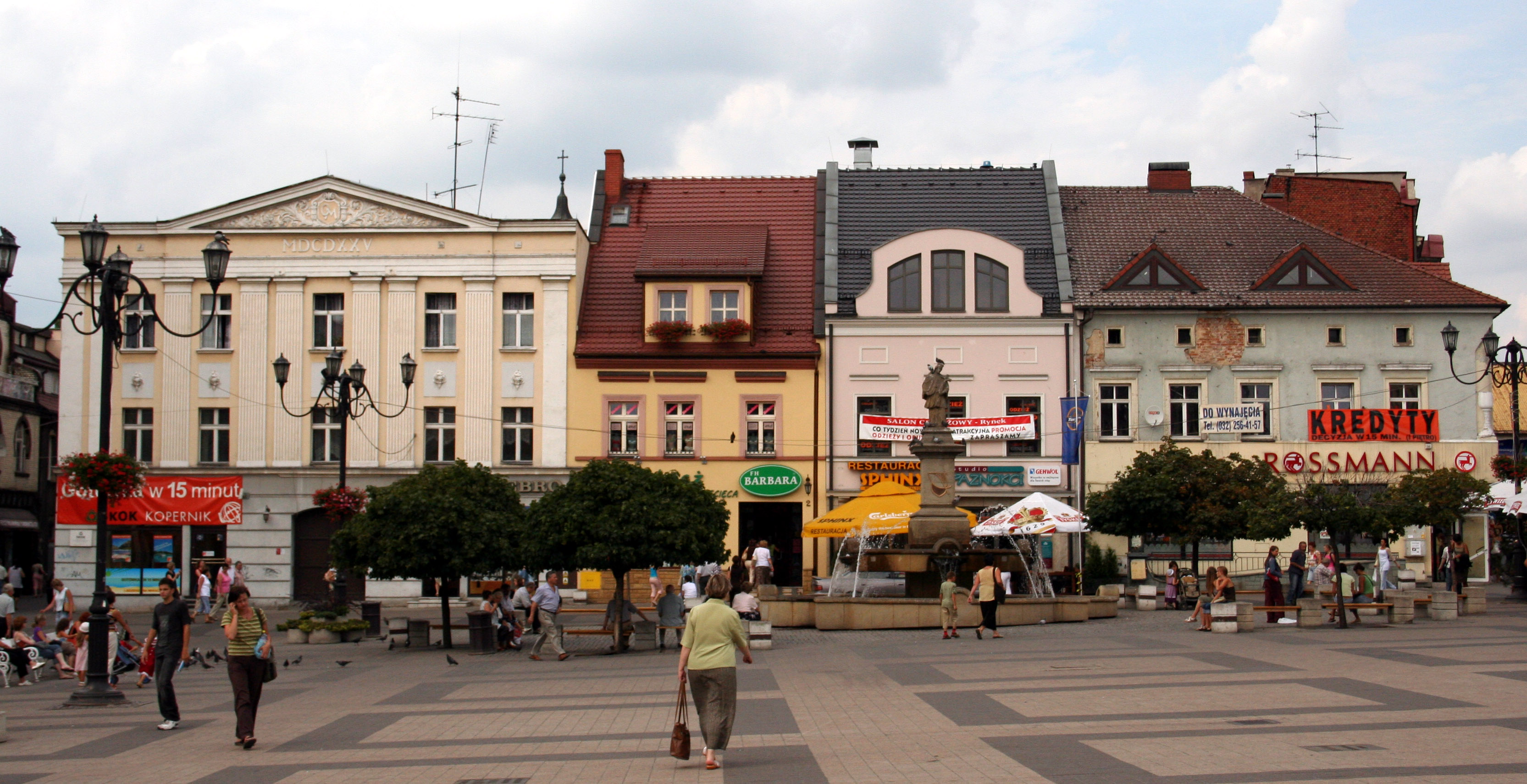
- Market Square

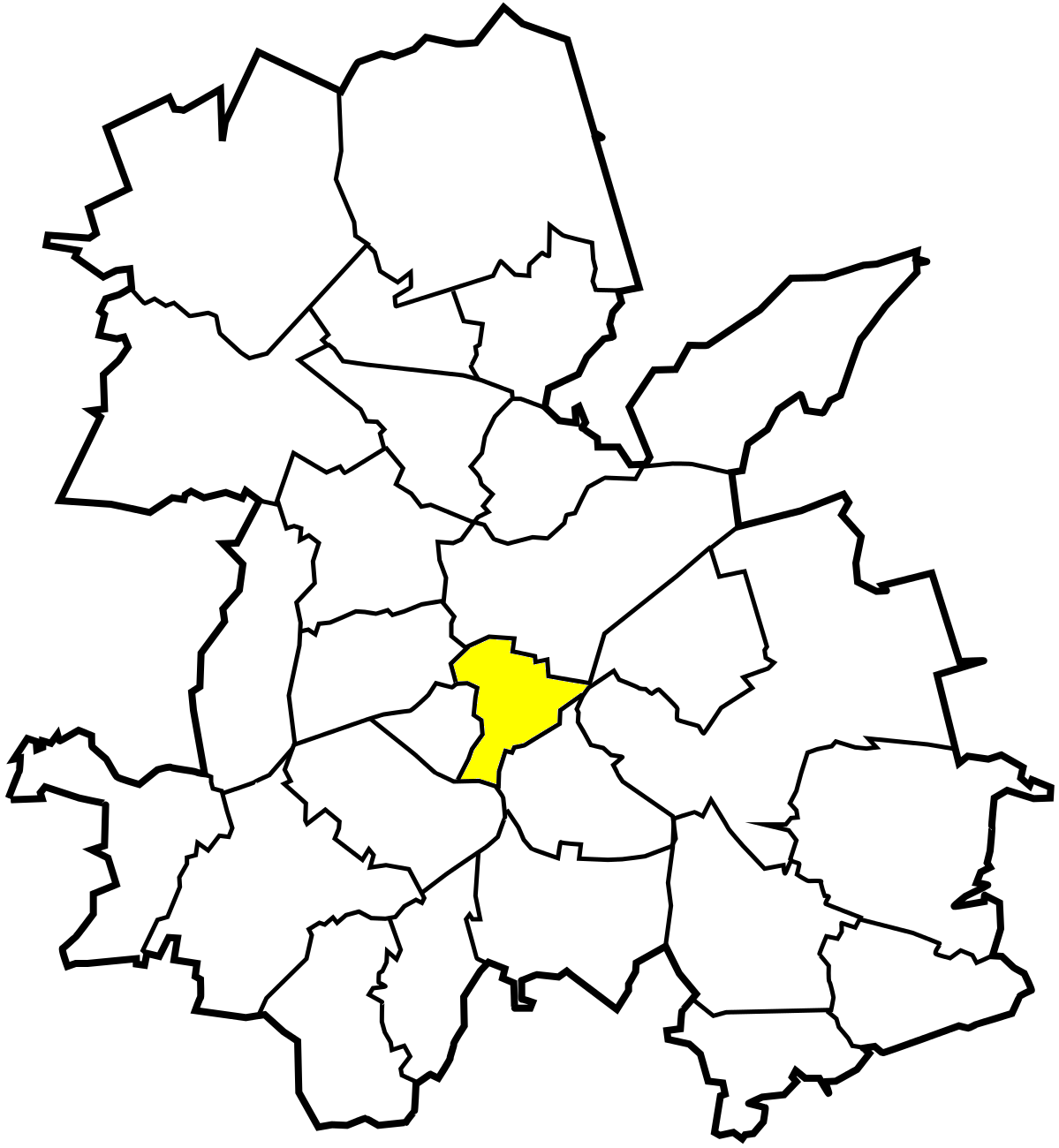
- Location of Śródmieście within Rybnik
- Coordinates: 50.095589°N 18.541999°E
- Country: Poland
- Voivodeship: Silesian
- County/City: Rybnik

Population (2013)
  - Total: 7,700
- Time zone: UTC+1 (CET)
  - Summer (DST): UTC+2 (CEST)
- Area code: (+48) 032

Śródmieście [ɕrudˈmjɛɕt͡ɕɛ] ('city centre') is a district of Rybnik, Silesian Voivodeship, southern Poland. In the late 2013 it had about 7,700 inhabitants.

The quarter encompasses the traditional area of Rybnik, old city, with market square, town hall, Basilica of St. Anthony, Our Lady of Sorrows church, Lutheran church, former Piast castle, theatre.
