= Ana Kamien =

Argentine choreographer

Ana Kamien (born in 1935) is an Argentine dancer, choreographer, and actor who based most of her works in Buenos Aires, Argentina. Kamien was known for challenging gender and class norms along with creating works that parodied classical ballet by mixing the dance style with contemporary dance.

Kamien is best known for her self-titled piece Ana Kamien (1970), a 16mm dance film she produced with the help of filmmaker Marcelo Epstein. Rodrigo Alonso, an art critic and historian, described the piece as "not only one of the first examples of dance for the camera in Argentina: it is also one of the best."

== Biography ==
Ana Kamien was born in the year 1935 in Buenos Aires, Argentina. Her father was a Polish immigrant who arrived in Argentina before World War II and her mother was a Ukrainian immigrant. She grew up in the Argentine neighborhood of Parque Patricios with her parents. Kamien was first introduced to dance through a class at her mother's night school. Kamien's mother did not have a sitter, so Kamien would go with her mother and stay in the dance room at her local night school while her mother attended class. She grew close to the dance teacher, Flora Martinez, and was able to attend dance classes for free. She presented her first public dance, Vals de las Flores, at the age of three years old at the night schools festival for children. At the age of 11, Kamien met Lida Martinolli at the Hurricane Club and joined Teatro Colón. She felt alone and intimidated by the many girls but continued with her lessons. At the age of 15, she received a card from a friend in Tucuman raving about a contemporary dance teacher named Renate Schottelius. She arrived at one of Schottelius's classes with her mother and was impressed by the dance techniques.

She found a job at a bank after graduating from secondary school in the 1950s, allowing her to help support her family.

In 1958, Kamien entered the Universidad de Buenos Aires to focus on contemporary dance. Here she met fellow dancer Marilu Marini who she would later go on to choreograph many dance pieces alongside.

Kamien studied with many different dance professionals such as Renate Schottelius, Maria Fux, and Dore Hoyer.

In 1969, Kamien and her husband Leone Sonnino opened up a multipurpose space in the San Telmo neighborhood of Buenos Aires. Kamien taught contemporary techniques whilst Sonnino used the remaining space as a photography studio. According to Kamien,

"The dance studios were relatively safe spaces. I think they were safer than theaters, where the word is used and things are said. They were gathering places. The studios were filled with people. Even though it seems odd, they were filled with men; the men felt safe, it was a place where they felt they could express themselves, that they could be, that they could express themselves in all possible forms. They were, I believe, cultural and expensive asylums. It was a great boom."

Kamien currently lives in Buenos Aires, Argentina.

== Notable performances ==
=== Ana Kamien ===
This piece was choreographed by Kamien herself at the Centro Cultural General San Martin in 1970. This piece explicitly critiqued the military violence in Argentina at the time of Juan Carlos Ongania's dictatorship in the late 1960s. It aligned with the broader struggles for labor rights and the fight against the military.

=== Danza Actual ===
This was a dance group co-created by Kamien, Marilu Marini and Graciela Martinez in 1963 at the Instituto Torcuato Di Tella in Buenos Aires. It combined ballet with folk and pop music as well as the worlds of comics, Hollywood movies, music hall and fashion photography.

=== Danse Bouquet ===
Choreographed in 1965, Marilu Marini and Kamien worked together again to create this piece at the Instituto Torcuato Di Tella Institute Audiovisual Experimentation Center in Buenos Aires. The performance parodied the artistic elitism the choreographers felt through the other sectors of the Buenos Aires concert dance scene. It aimed to "avoid all the affectations: those of classical dance and those of modern dance" by transgressing the norms of concert dance production and challenged offstage gender norms during the early 1960s.

=== La Fiesta Hoy ===
Also known as "The Party Today!," it was created Marilu Marini and Ana Kamien created this piece in 1966 at the Instituto Torcuato Di Tella in Buenos Aires. This followed the episodic structure similar to Danse Bouquet which incorporated found objects and visual elements.

=== Oh! Casta Diva ===
"Oh! Casta Diva" was choreographed with the help of Milka Truol at the Instituto Torcuato Di Tella in Buenos Aires. This piece was created in 1967 and was created after the Italian composer Vincenzo Bellini's nineteenth-century aria musical piece.

=== Visianes de Milonga ===
This dance was choreographed by Kamien with the help of her husband Leone Sonnino at the Instituto Torcuato Di Tella in Buenos Aires.

== Exhibitions ==
- Kamien participated in the 4th Festival of Contemporary Dance in Bonn, Germany.
- Kamien presented her dance at the Vrouwenfestival in Amsterdam.
- 2017- Radical Women: Latin American Art, 1960-1985, Hammer Museum in Los Angeles
- 2018- Radical Women: Latin American Art, 1960-1985, Brooklyn Museum of Art

== Honors ==
- Between 2001 and 2003, she was the president of CoCoA-Datei (Coreografos Contemporaneos Asociados Danza Teatro Independiente), a national organization that brought together experimental Argentine dancers and choreographers.
- Kamien was the vocal of the Prodanza de la Secretaria de Cultura del Gobeierno de la Ciudad de Buenos Aires between the years of 2003 and 2005.
