= Zebrzydowice, Rybnik =

Zebrzydowice
- Rybnik District
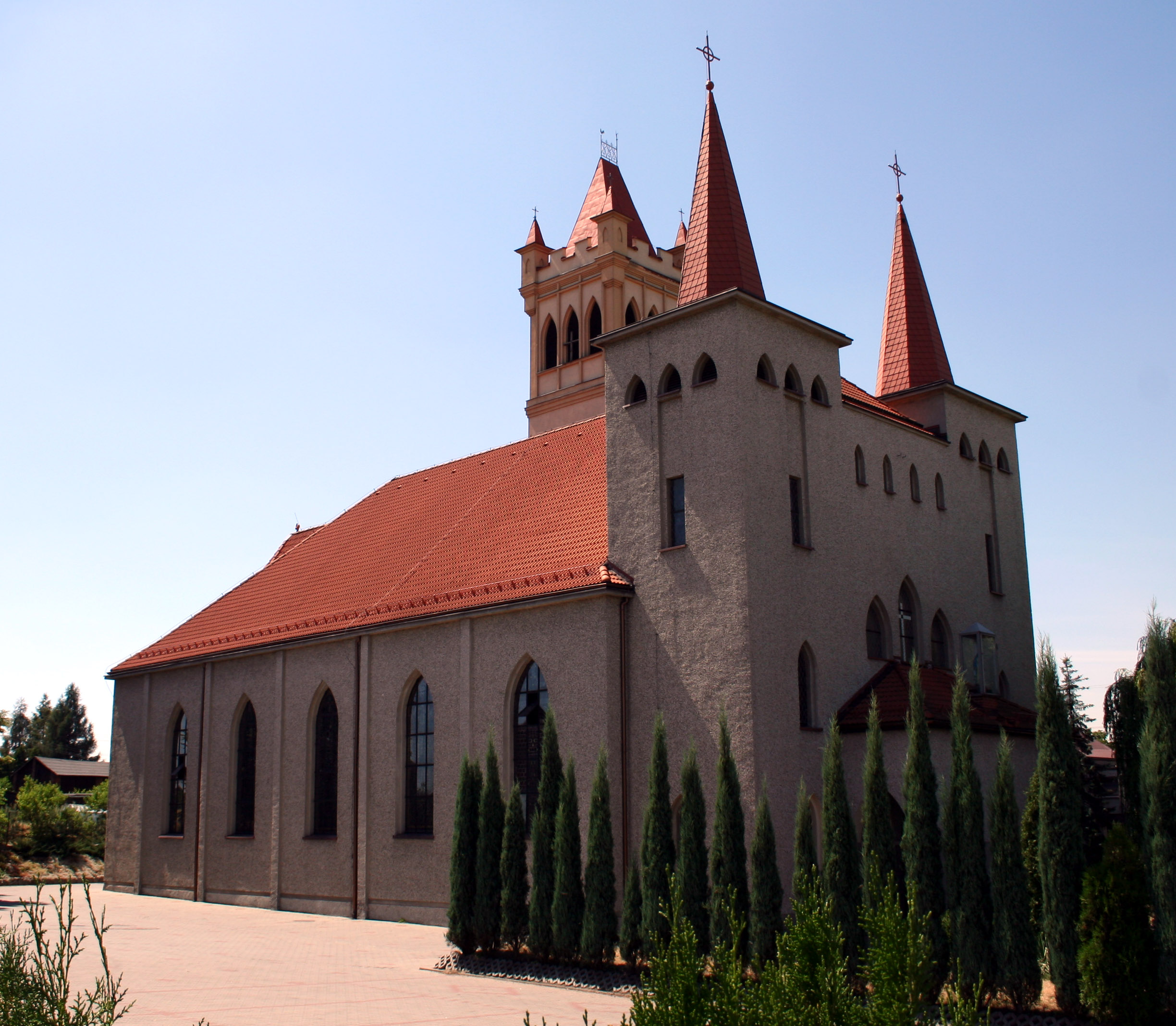
- Church of Our Lady of the Scapular and St. Pius X

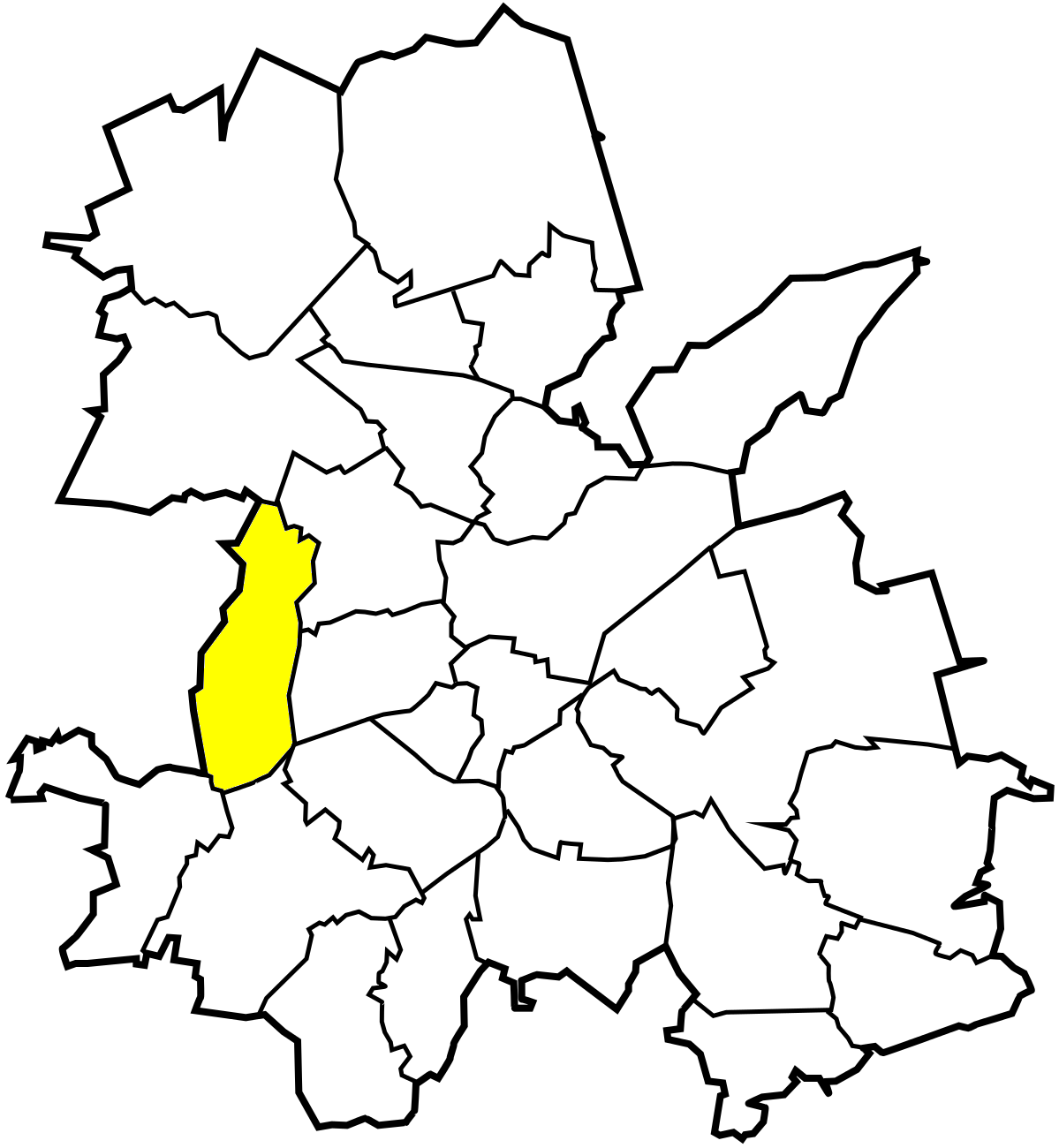
- Location of Zebrzydowice within Rybnik
- Coordinates: 50.101562°N 18.493530°E
- Country: Poland
- Voivodeship: Silesian
- County/City: Rybnik

Population (2013)
  - Total: 3,150
- Time zone: UTC+1 (CET)
  - Summer (DST): UTC+2 (CEST)
- Area code: (+48) 032

Zebrzydowice (German: Seibersdorf) is a district of Rybnik, Silesian Voivodeship, southern Poland. On December 31, 2013 it had 3,150 inhabitants.

== History ==
Before the 17th century the village belonged to Zebrzydowski family.

After World War I in the Upper Silesia plebiscite 332 out of 380 voters in Zebrzydowice voted in favour of joining Poland, against 47 opting for staying in Germany. In 1922 it became a part of Silesian Voivodeship, Second Polish Republic. It was then annexed by Nazi Germany at the beginning of World War II. After the war it was restored to Poland. It was amalgamated with Rybnik in 1973.
