= Ochojec, Rybnik =

Ochojec
- Rybnik District
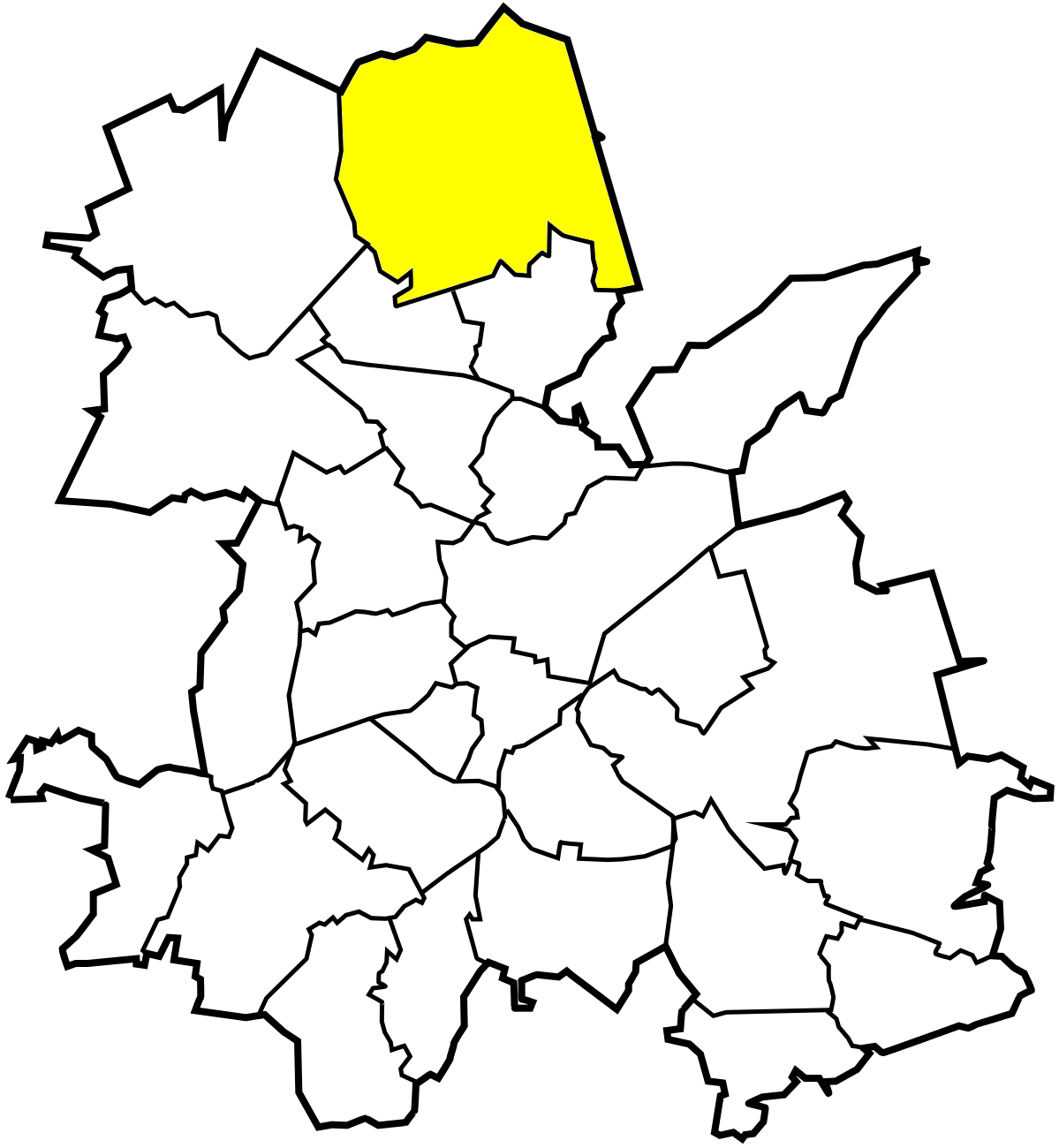
- Location of Ochojec within Rybnik
- Coordinates: 50.166855°N 18.540335°E
- Country: Poland
- Voivodeship: Silesian
- County/City: Rybnik

Population (2013)
  - Total: 2,000
- Time zone: UTC+1 (CET)
  - Summer (DST): UTC+2 (CEST)
- Area code: (+48) 032

Ochojec (German: Ochojetz) is a district of Rybnik, Silesian Voivodeship, southern Poland. In the late 2013 it had about 2,000 inhabitants.

== History ==
The village was first mentioned in 1291.

After World War I in the Upper Silesia plebiscite 231 out of 283 voters in Ochojec voted in favour of joining Poland, against 52 opting for staying in Germany.

In years 1973-1977 it was a seat of gmina, which was on May 27, 1975 amalgamated with Rybnik.

The village became a seat of a Catholic parish in 2012.
