= 2005–06 DFB-Pokal =

German football tournament season

Tournament details
- Country: Germany
- Teams: 64

Final positions
- Champions: Bayern Munich
- Runners-up: Eintracht Frankfurt

Tournament statistics
- Matches played: 63

The 2005–06 DFB-Pokal was the 63rd season of the annual German football cup competition. Sixty-four teams competed in the tournament of six rounds which began on 19 August 2005 and ended on 29 April 2006. In the final, Bayern Munich defeated Eintracht Frankfurt 1–0, thereby claiming their 13th title and also winning the double. It was the first time in German football that a team won the double two seasons in a row.

== Matches ==
Times up to 29 October 2005 and from 26 March 2006 are CEST (UTC+2). Times from 30 October 2005 to 25 March 2006 are CET (UTC+1).

=== First round ===
19 August 2005	Wuppertaler SV Borussia	1–2	1860 Munich	Wuppertal
18:30	Schaffrath 12'	report (in German)	Costa 68'; Agostino 73'	Stadium: Stadion am Zoo; Attendance: 8.700; Referee: Christian Dingert (Thallichtenberg)

19 August 2005	Rot-Weiß Oberhausen	1–2	Eintracht Frankfurt	Oberhausen
19:00	Gatarić 77'	report (in German)	Huggel 36'; Amanatidis 52'	Stadium: Niederrheinstadion; Attendance: 3.800; Referee: Michael Sahler (Mutterstadt)

19 August 2005	Holstein Kiel	0–2	SpVgg Unterhaching	Kiel
19:00		report (in German)	Marić 50'; Sobotzik 87'	Stadium: Holstein-Stadion; Attendance: 4.200; Referee: Peter Gagelmann (Bremen)

19 August 2005	Rot-Weiss Essen	2–2 (a.e.t.) (4–5 p)	Energie Cottbus	Essen
19:00	Bemben 12' (pen.); Bošković 55'	report (in German)	Kioyo 56'; Radu 60'	Stadium: Georg-Melches-Stadion; Attendance: 10.500; Referee: Herbert Fandel (Kyllburg)
	Penalties
	(penalty scored) Lorenz; (penalty scored) Bošković; (penalty scored) Younga-Mouhani; (penalty scored) Bemben; (penalty missed) Haeldermans; (penalty missed) Larsen		(penalty missed) Sidney; (penalty scored) Schöckel; (penalty scored) Radu; (penalty scored) Jungnickel; (penalty scored) Sahin; (penalty scored) Piplica

19 August 2005	1. FC Köln II	0–4	Hannover 96	Cologne
19:00		report (in German)	Hashemian 6'; Brdarić 51'; Yankov 54'; Štajner 66'	Stadium: Südstadion; Attendance: 2.000; Referee: Guido Winkmann (Kerken)

19 August 2005	VfL Bochum II	2–3	Erzgebirge Aue	Bochum
19:00	Thamm 22'; Grote 57'	report (in German)	Demir 14'; Helbig 29'; Emmerich 51' (pen.)	Stadium: Ruhrstadion; Attendance: 2.800; Referee: Jochen Drees (Mainz)

19 August 2005	Mainz 05 II	0–3	Karlsruher SC	Mainz
19:30		report (in German)	Masmanidis 57'; Kapllani 63'; Kaufman 73'	Stadium: Stadion am Bruchweg; Attendance: 2.500; Referee: André Stachowiak (Duisburg)

19 August 2005	Rot-Weiß Erfurt	2–1 (a.e.t.)	LR Ahlen	Erfurt
19:30	Hebestreit 53'; Brunnemann 116'	report (in German)	Paulinho 56'	Stadium: Steigerwaldstadion; Attendance: 3.800; Referee: Holger Henschel (Braunschweig)

20 August 2005	FC St. Pauli	3–2 (a.e.t.)	Wacker Burghausen	Hamburg
14:30	Wojcik 10'; Tornieporth 77'; Luz 113'	report (in German)	Wiesinger 79'; Krejčí 81'	Stadium: Millerntor-Stadion; Attendance: 9.000; Referee: Babak Rafati (Hannover)

20 August 2005	Jahn Regensburg	1–3 (a.e.t.)	Alemannia Aachen	Regensburg
15:00	Glibo 60'	report (in German)	Plaßhenrich 15'; Pinto 99' (pen.); Schlaudraff 113'	Stadium: Jahnstadion; Attendance: 4.500; Referee: Markus Schmidt (Stuttgart)

20 August 2005	FC Ingolstadt	1–1 (a.e.t.) (4–5 p)	1. FC Saarbrücken	Ingolstadt
15:00	Tölcséres 7'	report (in German)	Thiebaut 8'	Stadium: Bezirkssportanlage Mitte; Attendance: 2.000; Referee: Ralf Brombacher (Kandern)
	Penalties
	(penalty scored) Tölcséres; (penalty missed) Meier; (penalty scored) Ismajli; (penalty scored) Gusic; (penalty scored) Zani; (penalty missed) Rosenwirth		(penalty scored) Nsaliwa; (penalty scored) Hagner; (penalty scored) Demai; (penalty missed) Thiebaut; (penalty scored) Hadji; (penalty scored) Rozgonyi

20 August 2005	Kickers Offenbach	3–1	1. FC Köln	Offenbach
15:30	Mokhtari 65'; Türker 72' (pen.); Rahn 86' (o.g.)	report (in German)	Feulner 29'	Stadium: Stadion am Bieberer Berg; Attendance: 15.500; Referee: Florian Meyer (Burgdorf)

20 August 2005	Tennis Borussia Berlin	0–6	VfL Bochum	Berlin
15:30		report (in German)	Drsek 6'; Diabang 18'; Edu 20'; Wosz 63'; Misimović 67'; Meichelbeck 83'	Stadium: Mommsenstadion; Attendance: 1.500; Referee: Stefan Lupp (Waldstadt)

20 August 2005	Stuttgarter Kickers	1–5	Hamburger SV	Stuttgart
15:30	Mešić 45' (pen.)	report (in German)	Barbarez 13', 80' (pen.); Atouba 69'; Takahara 76'; Mahdavikia 84'	Stadium: Gazi-Stadion auf der Waldau; Attendance: 8.800; Referee: Felix Brych (Munich)

20 August 2005	Eintracht Trier	0–3	1. FC Kaiserslautern	Trier
15:30		report (in German)	Pletsch 10'; Jancker 22'; Zandi 57'	Stadium: Moselstadion; Attendance: 7.500; Referee: Thorsten Kinhöfer (Herne)

20 August 2005	SC Paderborn	0–2	VfL Wolfsburg	Paderborn
15:30		report (in German)	Hanke 14'; Klimowicz 28'	Stadium: Hermann Löns Stadium; Attendance: 5.000; Referee: Manuel Gräfe (Berlin)

20 August 2005	Wattenscheid 09	1–3	Werder Bremen	Bochum
15:30	Toborg 87'	report (in German)	Klasnić 59'; Jensen 80' (pen.); Hunt 82'	Stadium: Lohrheidestadion; Attendance: 8.000; Referee: Michael Sahler (Mutterstadt)

20 August 2005	FC 08 Villingen	2–5 (a.e.t.)	Hansa Rostock	Villingen-Schwenningen
15:30	d'Incau 68', 78'	report (in German)	Lőw 18', 55'; Di Salvo 104'; Arvidsson 112'; Brečko 116'	Stadium: Friedengrundstadion; Attendance: 4.500; Referee: Tobias Welz (Wiesbaden)

20 August 2005	Rot-Weiß Erfurt II	0–8	Bayer Leverkusen	Erfurt
15:30		report (in German)	Athirson 15'; Berbatov 26'; Schneider 38', 89'; Voronin 57'; Lazović 68', 75', 78'	Stadium: Steigerwaldstadion; Attendance: 3.200; Referee: Christian Schößling (Leipzig)

20 August 2005	FC Bremerhaven	0–3	Schalke 04	Bremerhaven
18:00		report (in German)	Larsen 35', 65'; Bajramović 67'	Stadium: Nordseestadion; Attendance: 9.900; Referee: Thorsten Schriever (Otterndorf)

20 August 2005	TuS Koblenz	2–3 (a.e.t.)	Hertha BSC	Koblenz
18:45	Keita 89', 91'	report (in German)	Friedrich 7'; Marcelinho 93'; Kovač 102'	Stadium: Stadion Oberwerth; Attendance: 14.800; Referee: Lutz Wagner (Kriftel)

21 August 2005	Sachsen Leipzig	1–1 (a.e.t.) (3–5 p)	Dynamo Dresden	Leipzig
14:30	Semmer 90'	report (in German)	Cagara 18'	Stadium: Zentralstadion; Attendance: 30.500; Referee: Michael Weiner (Giesen)
	Penalties
	(penalty scored) Ferl; (penalty scored) Schwesinger; (penalty missed) Kittler; (penalty scored) Soltau		(penalty scored) Fröhlich; (penalty scored) Brinkmann; (penalty scored) Christ; (penalty scored) Cagara; (penalty scored) Wawrzyczek

21 August 2005	1899 Hoffenheim	3–4 (a.e.t.)	VfB Stuttgart	Sinsheim
14:30	Ollhoff 13'; Cescutti 45'; Örüm 120'	report (in German)	Meißner 37'; Tomasson 54'; Carević 100'; Cacau 117'	Stadium: Dietmar-Hopp-Stadion; Attendance: 5.000; Referee: Günter Perl (Munich)

21 August 2005	VfL Osnabrück	2–2 (a.e.t.) (10–9 p)	Greuther Fürth	Osnabrück
15:00	Feldhoff 51'; De Jong 83'	report (in German)	Timm 45'; Feinbier 82'	Stadium: Osnatel-Arena; Attendance: 8.000; Referee: Norbert Grudzinski (Hamburg)
	Penalties
	(penalty scored) Kügler; (penalty scored) Joppe; (penalty scored) Schäfer; (penalty scored) Enochs; (penalty scored) Feldhoff; (penalty scored) Koch; (penalty scored) de Jong; (penalty scored) Menga; (penalty scored) Ewertz; (penalty scored) Flottmann		(penalty scored) Barut; (penalty scored) Mijatović; (penalty scored) Timm; (penalty scored) Kleine; (penalty scored) Eigler; (penalty scored) Kokot; (penalty scored) Achenbach; (penalty scored) Hilbert; (penalty scored) Feinbier; (penalty missed) Weber

21 August 2005	Sportfreunde Siegen	0–1	SC Freiburg	Siegen
15:00		report (in German)	Iashvili 36'	Stadium: Leimbachstadion; Attendance: 5.000; Referee: Helmut Fleischer (Ulm)

21 August 2005	1. FC Eschborn	0–4	1. FC Nürnberg	Wiesbaden
15:30		report (in German)	Mintál 11'; Banović 25'; Mnari 27'; Pinola 34'	Stadium: Stadion an der Berliner Straße; Attendance: 3.500; Referee: Knut Kircher (Rottenburg)

21 August 2005	FC Kutzhof	0–3	Borussia Mönchengladbach	Saarbrücken
17:00		report (in German)	Heinz 46'; El Fakiri 49'; Kastrati 79'	Stadium: Ludwigsparkstadion; Attendance: 8.000; Referee: Michael Kempter (Sauldorf)

21 August 2005	VfL Wolfsburg II	0–1	MSV Duisburg	Wolfsburg
17:00		report (in German)	Lavrič 40'	Stadium: VfL-Stadion; Attendance: 1.000; Referee: Matthias Anklam (Buchholz in der Nordheide)

21 August 2005	MSV 1919 Neuruppin	0–4	Bayern Munich	Berlin
17:00		report (in German)	Ismaël 9'; Scholl 50', 86'; Ottl 69'	Stadium: Olympiastadion; Attendance: 33.200; Referee: Marc Seemann (Essen)

21 August 2005	Hansa Rostock II	0–3	Mainz 05	Rostock
17:00		report (in German)	Thurk 66'; Auer 79'; Ruman 81'	Stadium: Ostseestadion; Attendance: 2.000; Referee: Thomas Frank (Hannover)

21 August 2005	Preußen Magdeburg	0–3	Arminia Bielefeld	Magdeburg
17:00		report (in German)	Zuma 72', 89'; Fink 85'	Stadium: Heinrich-Germer-Stadion; Attendance: 2.100; Referee: Stefan Schempershauwe (Hildesheim)

22 August 2005	Eintracht Braunschweig	2–1	Borussia Dortmund	Braunschweig
20:30	Rische 41'; Graf 84'	report (in German)	Koller 28'	Stadium: Eintracht-Stadion; Attendance: 22.200; Referee: Peter Sippel (Munich)

=== Second round ===
25 October 2005	FC St. Pauli	4–0	VfL Bochum	Hamburg
19:30	Mazingu-Dinzey 6'; Luz 39'; Lechner 56'; Shubitidse 77'	report (in German)		Stadium: Millerntor-Stadion; Attendance: 13.200; Referee: Michael Kempter (Sauldorf)

25 October 2005	Rot-Weiß Erfurt	2–4	1. FC Kaiserslautern	Erfurt
19:30	David 38'; Mensah 68'	report (in German)	Sanogo 25', 27'; Engelhardt 70'; Altıntop 75'	Stadium: Steigerwaldstadion; Attendance: 10.400; Referee: Thorsten Schriever (Otterndorf)

25 October 2005	SpVgg Unterhaching	2–1 (a.e.t.)	1. FC Saarbrücken	Unterhaching
19:30	Teinert 75'; N'Diaye 115'	report (in German)	Hadji 56'	Stadium: Generali Sportpark; Attendance: 1.500; Referee: Tobias Welz (Wiesbaden)

25 October 2005	Werder Bremen	2–2 (a.e.t.) (5–4 p)	VfL Wolfsburg	Bremen
19:30	Klose 88', 105'	report (in German)	Marlet 64', 120'	Stadium: Weserstadion; Attendance: 20.000; Referee: Thorsten Kinhöfer (Herne)
	Penalties
	(penalty scored) Klasnić; (penalty scored) Jensen; (penalty missed) Naldo; (penalty scored) Valdez; (penalty scored) Borowski; (penalty scored) Hunt		(penalty missed) D'Alessandro; (penalty scored) Quiroga; (penalty scored) Menseguez; (penalty scored) Hofland; (penalty scored) Marlet; (penalty missed) Thiam

25 October 2005	Eintracht Frankfurt	6–0	Schalke 04	Frankfurt am Main
19:30	Meier 28', 68'; Huggel 30'; Spycher 64'; Copado 79'; Ochs 85'	report (in German)		Stadium: Commerzbank-Arena; Attendance: 33.200; Referee: Felix Brych (Munich)

25 October 2005	1. FC Nürnberg	3–0	Dynamo Dresden	Nuremberg
19:30	Daun 42', 68'; Banović 84' (pen.)	report (in German)		Stadium: Frankenstadion; Attendance: 13.800; Referee: Babak Rafati (Hannover)

25 October 2005	Alemannia Aachen	1–2	Hannover 96	Aachen
19:30	Ebbers 73'	report (in German)	Brdarić 9' (pen.), 82'	Stadium: Tivoli; Attendance: 18.100; Referee: Peter Sippel (Munich)

25 October 2005	SC Freiburg	4–1	Eintracht Braunschweig	Freiburg
19:30	Koejoe 45', 64'; Iashvili 78'; Antar 81'	report (in German)	Graf 29'	Stadium: Badenova-Stadion; Attendance: 5.500; Referee: Christian Dingert (Thallichtenberg)

26 October 2005	VfL Osnabrück	2–2 (a.e.t.) (2–4 p)	Mainz 05	Osnabrück
19:30	Reichenberger 5'; Feldhoff 48'	report (in German)	Rômulo 2'; Ruman 80'	Stadium: Osnatel-Arena; Attendance: 12.000; Referee: Jochen Drees (Münster)
	Penalties
	(penalty missed) Schäfer; (penalty scored) Reichenberger; (penalty missed) Wedau; (penalty scored) Heidenreich		(penalty scored) Da Silva; (penalty missed) Peković; (penalty scored) Zidan; (penalty scored) Gerber; (penalty scored) Thurk

26 October 2005	Hamburger SV	3–2	Bayer Leverkusen	Hamburg
19:30	Van Buyten 55'; Barbarez 62'; Wicky 84'	report (in German)	Berbatov 3', 81'	Stadium: AOL Arena; Attendance: 35.900; Referee: Michael Weiner (Giesen)

26 October 2005	1860 Munich	3–2	MSV Duisburg	Munich
19:30	Shao 37'; Lehmann 42'; Vučićević 85'	report (in German)	Anfang 48'; Lottner 66'	Stadium: Allianz Arena; Attendance: 14.500; Referee: Knut Kircher (Rottenburg)

26 October 2005	Arminia Bielefeld	2–1	Energie Cottbus	Bielefeld
19:30	Küntzel 23', 56'	report (in German)	Gomez 9'	Stadium: Schüco-Arena; Attendance: 9.000; Referee: Markus Schmidt (Stuttgart)

26 October 2005	Hansa Rostock	3–2	VfB Stuttgart	Rostock
19:30	Schied 16'; Prica 28'; Arvidsson 41'	report (in German)	Hitzlsperger 3'; Ljuboja 82'	Stadium: Ostseestadion; Attendance: 13.000; Referee: Franz-Xaver Wack (Biberbach)

26 October 2005	Kickers Offenbach	2–1	Karlsruher SC	Offenbach
19:30	Türker 27'; Wörle 29'	report (in German)	Masmanidis 70'	Stadium: Stadion am Bieberer Berg; Attendance: 10.300; Referee: Jochen Drees (Münster)

26 October 2005	Hertha BSC	3–0	Borussia Mönchengladbach	Berlin
19:30	Fathi 35'; Cairo 51'; Marx 80'	report (in German)		Stadium: Olympiastadion; Attendance: 25.100; Referee: Florian Meyer (Burgdorf)

26 October 2005	Erzgebirge Aue	0–1	Bayern Munich	Aue
20:30		report (in German)	Ballack 80'	Stadium: Erzgebirgsstadion; Attendance: 16.500; Referee: Peter Gagelmann (Bremen)

=== Round of 16 ===
20 December 2005	Arminia Bielefeld	2–0	SpVgg Unterhaching	Bielefeld
19:00	Borges 7'; Đalović 25'	report (in German)		Stadium: Schüco-Arena; Attendance: 11.700; Referee: Christian Schößling (Leipzig)

20 December 2005	SC Freiburg	1–3 (a.e.t.)	1860 Munich	Freiburg
19:00	Sanou 77'	report (in German)	Shao 90'; Agostino 96'; Meyer 105'	Stadium: Badenova-Stadion; Attendance: 10.000; Referee: Peter Gagelmann (Bremen)

20 December 2005	1. FC Kaiserslautern	1–1 (a.e.t.) (3–4 p)	Mainz 05	Kaiserslautern
20:30	Engelhardt 29'	report (in German)	Da Silva 62'	Stadium: Fritz-Walter-Stadion; Attendance: 35.000; Referee: Michael Weiner (Giesen)
	Penalties
	(penalty scored) Blank; (penalty scored) Hertzsch; (penalty missed) Zandi; (penalty missed) Altıntop; (penalty scored) Engelhardt; (penalty missed) Halfar		(penalty missed) Babatz; (penalty missed) Demirtas; (penalty scored) Da Silva; (penalty scored) Gerber; (penalty scored) Zidan; (penalty scored) Ruman

21 December 2005	Eintracht Frankfurt	1–1 (a.e.t.) (4–1 p)	1. FC Nürnberg	Frankfurt am Main
19:00	Copado 35' (pen.)	report (in German)	Kießling 43'	Stadium: Commerzbank-Arena; Attendance: 39.000; Referee: Herbert Fandel (Kyllburg)
	Penalties
	(penalty scored) Köhler; (penalty scored) Copado; (penalty scored) Preuß; (penalty scored) Huggel		(penalty missed) Pinola; (penalty missed) Saenko; (penalty scored) Banović

21 December 2005	Hannover 96	1–4	Werder Bremen	Hannover
19:00	Sousa 85' (pen.)	report (in German)	Naldo 71'; Frings 83' (pen.); Balitsch 89' (o.g.); Hunt 90'	Stadium: AWD-Arena; Attendance: 49.900; Referee: Markus Merk (Otterbach)

21 December 2005	FC St. Pauli	4–3 (a.e.t.)	Hertha BSC	Hamburg
19:00	Mazingu-Dinzey 45'; Luz 86'; Lechner 104'; Palikuća 109'	report (in German)	Pantelić 8'; Gilberto 40'; Marcelinho 100'	Stadium: Millerntorstadion; Attendance: 19.800; Referee: Knut Kircher (Rottenburg)

21 December 2005	Hansa Rostock	1–1 (a.e.t.) (3–4 p)	Kickers Offenbach	Rostock
19:00	Schied 90'	report (in German)	Türker 23'	Stadium: Ostseestadion; Attendance: 17.000; Referee: Manuel Gräfe (Berlin)
	Penalties
	(penalty scored) Hansen; (penalty scored) Bülow; (penalty missed) Madsen; (penalty scored) Rydlewicz; (penalty missed) Shapourzadeh		(penalty scored) Judt; (penalty missed) Mokhtari; (penalty scored) Wandeir; (penalty scored) Sieger; (penalty scored) Yıldırım

21 December 2005	Bayern Munich	1–0 (a.e.t.)	Hamburger SV	Munich
20:30	Hargreaves 113'	report (in German)		Stadium: Allianz Arena; Attendance: 66.000; Referee: Thorsten Kinhöfer (Herne)

=== Quarter-finals ===
24 January 2006	Bayern Munich	3–2 (a.e.t.)	Mainz 05	Munich
20:30	Pizarro 81', 115'; Guerrero 94'	report (in German)	Zidan 21' (pen.); Ruman 106'	Stadium: Allianz Arena; Attendance: 53.000; Referee: Florian Meyer (Burgdorf)

25 January 2006	Arminia Bielefeld	1–1 (a.e.t.) (4–2 p)	Kickers Offenbach	Bielefeld
19:00	Boakye 28'	report (in German)	Judt 27' (pen.)	Stadium: Schüco-Arena; Attendance: 17.600; Referee: Peter Sippel (Munich)
	Penalties
	(penalty scored) Westermann; (penalty scored) Kobylík; (penalty scored) Boakye; (penalty scored) Masmanidis		(penalty missed) Judt; (penalty scored) Diabang; (penalty scored) Rehm; (penalty missed) Sieger

25 January 2006	1860 Munich	1–3	Eintracht Frankfurt	Munich
19:00	Reisinger 11'	report (in German)	Copado 21'; Amanatidis 77'; Meier 90'	Stadium: Allianz Arena; Attendance: 24.000; Referee: Thorsten Kinhöfer (Herne)

25 January 2006	FC St. Pauli	3–1	Werder Bremen	Hamburg
20:30	Mazingu-Dinzey 10'; Boll 59'; Schultz 65'	report (in German)	Micoud 27'	Stadium: Millerntor-Stadion; Attendance: 19.800; Referee: Felix Brych (Munich)

=== Semi-finals ===
11 April 2006	Eintracht Frankfurt	1–0	Arminia Bielefeld	Frankfurt am Main
20:30	Amanatidis 16'	report (in German)		Stadium: Commerzbank-Arena; Attendance: 50.000; Referee: Markus Merk (Otterbach)

12 April 2006	FC St. Pauli	0–3	Bayern Munich	Hamburg
20:30		report (in German)	Hargreaves 15'; Pizarro 84', 89'	Stadium: Millerntor-Stadion; Attendance: 19.400; Referee: Knut Kircher (Rottenburg)

=== Final ===
29 April 2006
20:00 CEST

Eintracht Frankfurt	0–1	Bayern Munich
	Report	Pizarro 59'

Olympiastadion, Berlin
Attendance: 74,349
Referee: Herbert Fandel (Kyllburg)
