= 1999 DFB-Pokal final =

- Match programme cover
- Event: 1998–99 DFB-Pokal
Bayern Munich	Werder Bremen
1	1
- After extra time Werder Bremen won 5–4 on penalties
- Date: 12 June 1999
- Venue: Olympiastadion, Berlin
- Referee: Jürgen Aust (Cologne)
- Attendance: 75,841
- Weather: Light rain 15 °C (59 °F); 82% humidity

The 1999 DFB-Pokal final decided the winner of the 1998–99 DFB-Pokal, the 56th season of Germany's premier knockout football cup competition. It was played on 12 June 1999 at the Olympiastadion in Berlin. Werder Bremen won the match 5–4 on penalties against Bayern Munich, following a 1–1 draw after extra time, to claim their 4th cup title.

== Route to the final ==
The DFB-Pokal began with 64 teams in a single-elimination knockout cup competition. There were a total of five rounds leading up to the final. Teams were drawn against each other, and the winner after 90 minutes would advance. If still tied, 30 minutes of extra time was played. If the score was still level, a penalty shoot-out was used to determine the winner.

Note: In all results below, the score of the finalist is given first (H: home; A: away).

Bayern Munich		Round	Werder Bremen
Opponent	Result	1998–99 DFB-Pokal	Opponent	Result
LR Ahlen (A)	5–0	Round 1	Bayer Leverkusen Amateure (A)	2–1 (a.e.t.)
Greuther Fürth (A)	0–0 (a.e.t.) (4–3 p)	Round 2	Hansa Rostock (H)	3–2
MSV Duisburg (A)	4–2	Round of 16	Fortuna Düsseldorf (H)	3–2
VfB Stuttgart (H)	3–0	Quarter-finals	Tennis Borussia Berlin (H)	2–1 (a.e.t.)
Rot-Weiß Oberhausen (A)	3–1	Semi-finals	VfL Wolfsburg (A)	1–0

== Match ==
=== Details ===
12 June 1999
19:30 CEST

Bayern Munich	1–1 (a.e.t.)	Werder Bremen
Jancker 45'	Report	Maksymov 4'
Penalties
Salihamidžić (penalty scored); Daei (penalty scored); Tarnat (penalty scored); Jancker (penalty scored); Effenberg (penalty missed); Matthäus (penalty missed)	4–5	(penalty scored) Bode; (penalty missed) Todt; (penalty scored) Bogdanović; (penalty scored) Wicky; (penalty scored) Eilts; (penalty scored) Rost

Olympiastadion, Berlin
Attendance: 75,841
Referee: Jürgen Aust (Cologne)

Bayern Munich	Werder Bremen

GK	1	(Germany) Oliver Kahn (c)
SW	10	(Germany) Lothar Matthäus
CB	25	(Germany) Thomas Linke
CB	4	(Ghana) Samuel Kuffour		(substituted off) 37'
RWB	2	(Germany) Markus Babbel
LWB	18	(Germany) Michael Tarnat
CM	11	(Germany) Stefan Effenberg	Yellow card
CM	16	(Germany) Jens Jeremies		(substituted off) 57'
RW	14	(Germany) Mario Basler	(yellow card) (yellow-red card) 114'
LW	7	(Germany) Mehmet Scholl		(substituted off) 84'
CF	19	(Germany) Carsten Jancker	Yellow card
Substitutes:
GK	12	(Germany) Sven Scheuer
MF	17	(Germany) Thorsten Fink		(substituted on) 57'
MF	20	(Bosnia and Herzegovina) Hasan Salihamidžić		(substituted on) 84'
FW	21	(Germany) Alexander Zickler
FW	24	(Iran) Ali Daei		(substituted on) 37'
Manager:
(Germany) Ottmar Hitzfeld

GK	1	(Germany) Frank Rost	Yellow card
RB	3	(Switzerland) Raphaël Wicky	Yellow card
CB	8	(Germany) Bernhard Trares	Yellow card
CB	6	(Germany) Jens Todt
LB	13	(Germany) Andree Wiedener
DM	5	(Germany) Dieter Eilts (c)
DM	23	(Germany) Christoph Dabrowski		(substituted off) 69'
RM	22	(Germany) Torsten Frings
AM	18	(Austria) Andi Herzog		(substituted off) 45'
LM	7	(Ukraine) Yuriy Maksymov
CF	17	(Germany) Marco Bode
Substitutes:
GK	12	(Germany) Stefan Brasas
DF	30	(Poland) Paweł Wojtala		(substituted on) 45'
MF	4	(Germany) Dirk Flock
MF	20	(Germany) Christian Brand
MF	24	(Germany) Sven Benken
FW	9	(Federal Republic of Yugoslavia) Rade Bogdanović		(substituted on) 69'
FW	32	(Brazil) Aílton
Manager:
(Germany) Thomas Schaaf

Match rules

- 90 minutes.
- 30 minutes of extra time if necessary.
- Penalty shoot-out if scores still level.
- Seven named substitutes, of which up to three may be used.
