= 1998–99 DFB-Pokal =

Tournament details
- Country: Germany
- Teams: 64

Final positions
- Champions: Werder Bremen
- Runners-up: Bayern Munich

Tournament statistics
- Matches played: 63
- Top goal scorer: Achim Weber (6)

The 1998–99 DFB-Pokal was the 56th season of the annual German football cup competition. Sixty-four teams competed in the tournament of six rounds which began on 28 August 1998 and ended on 6 June 1999. In the final Werder Bremen defeated Bayern Munich 5–4 on penalties, thereby claiming their fourth title.

== Matches ==
Times up to 24 October 1998 and from 28 March 1999 are CEST (UTC+2). Times from 25 October 1998 to 27 March 1999 are CET (UTC+1).

=== First round ===
28 August 1998	SV Schalding-Heining	0 – 1	SpVgg Unterhaching	Schalding-Heining
		Report (in German)	Rraklli 63'	Attendance: 2,200; Referee: Knut Kircher (Rottenburg)

28 August 1998	Sportfreunde Eisbachtal	1 – 0 (a.e.t.)	FC Gütersloh	Nentershausen
	Bigvava 104'	Report (in German)		Attendance: 2,200; Referee: Stefan Weber (Eisenach)

28 August 1998	1. FC Saarbrücken	1 – 1 (a.e.t.) (1–3 p)	Borussia Dortmund	Saarbrücken
	Choji 42'	Report (in German)	Nerlinger 21'	Stadium: Ludwigsparkstadion; Attendance: 25,000; Referee: Helmut Fleischer (Ulm)
	Penalties
	Da Palma (penalty missed); Weber (penalty scored); Gerlach (penalty missed); Caillas (penalty missed)		Nerlinger (penalty scored); Möller (penalty scored); Barbarez (penalty missed); Chapuisat (penalty scored)

28 August 1998	Karlsruher SC	3 – 4	VfL Wolfsburg	Karlsruhe
	Krieg 27' (pen.), 32', 53'	Report (in German)	Baumgart 41'; Juskowiak 63'; Kleeschätzky 69'; Akonnor 88'	Stadium: Wildparkstadion; Attendance: 11,000; Referee: Hemann Albrecht (Kaufbeuren)

28 August 1998	FC St. Pauli (A)	0 – 5	Bayer Leverkusen	Hamburg
		Report (in German)	Kirsten 66', 71' (pen.); Beinlich 79'; Lehnhoff 81'; Meijer 83'	Stadium: Stadion am Hoheluft; Attendance: 4,900; Referee: Michael Weiner (Giesen)

28 August 1998	Hansa Rostock (A)	0 – 3	MSV Duisburg	Rostock
		Report (in German)	Vana 18'; Beierle 19'; Wedau 35'	Attendance: 500; Referee: Ralf Hilmes (Nordhorn)

28 August 1998	Tennis Borussia Berlin	1 – 0	Hannover 96	Berlin
	Kovacec 40'	Report (in German)		Stadium: Mommsenstadion; Attendance: 2,100; Referee: Wolfgang Stark (Landshut)

28 August 1998	Kickers Offenbach	0 – 1	SG Wattenscheid 09	Offenbach
		Report (in German)	Allievi 73'	Stadium: Stadion am Bieberer Berg; Attendance: 12,000; Referee: Schütz (Düsseldorf)

29 August 1998	Werder Bremen (A)	0 – 1	Rot-Weiss Oberhausen	Bremen
		Report (in German)	Weber 45'	Stadium: Weserstadion, Platz 11; Attendance: 800; Referee: Bernd Hauer (Celle)

29 August 1998	Sportfreunde Dorfmerkingen	0 – 3	Stuttgarter Kickers	Dorfmerkingen
		Report (in German)	Sebescen 16'; Raspe 50' (pen.); Carnevale 67'	Attendance: 2,500; Referee: Knopp (Wiesbaden)

29 August 1998	Chemnitzer FC	1 – 2	SC Freiburg	Chemnitz
	Mehlhorn 31'	Report (in German)	Weißhaupt 1', 38'	Stadium: Stadion an der Gellertstraße; Attendance: 6,300; Referee: Uwe Kemmling (Kleinburgwedel)

29 August 1998	Bayer Leverkusen (A)	1 – 2 (a.e.t.)	Werder Bremen	Leverkusen
	Demir 34'	Report (in German)	Frings 44'; Maximov 114'	Attendance: 1,500; Referee: Frank Gettke (Haltern)

29 August 1998	SG Hoechst	1 – 2	Energie Cottbus	Frankfurt
	Zürlein 90'	Report (in German)	Vata 83'; Irrgang 84'	Attendance: 1,000; Referee: Schmitt (Sillenbach)

29 August 1998	SV Straelen	4 – 7	Fortuna Düsseldorf	Straelen
	Gottwald 27'; Kersten 72'; Kosztowniak 75'; Schröers 85'	Report (in German)	Lesniak 8', 34', 56', 76', 87'; Tare 31', 50'	Attendance: 3,400; Referee: Detlef Scheppe (Wenden)

29 August 1998	Sportfreunde Siegen	3 – 1 (a.e.t.)	Mainz 05	Siegen
	Jonjić 87'; Cirba 105'; Sarić 119'	Report (in German)	Grevelhörster 36'	Stadium: Leimbachstadion; Attendance: 5,200; Referee: Georg Dardenne (Nettersheim)

29 August 1998	VfB Lübeck	1 – 2	VfB Stuttgart	Lübeck
	Kullig 32'	Report (in German)	Ristić 2'; Lisztes 63'	Stadium: Lohmühle; Attendance: 13,000; Referee: Torsten Koop (Lüttenmark)

29 August 1998	Carl Zeiss Jena	1 – 0	SSV Ulm 1846	Jena
	Hauser 50'	Report (in German)		Stadium: Ernst-Abbe-Sportfeld; Attendance: 1,800; Referee: Christian Schößling (Leipzig)

29 August 1998	VfB Leipzig	2 – 4 (a.e.t.)	1860 Munich	Leipzig
	Dittgen 29'; Bančić 86'	Report (in German)	Schroth 35'; Küttner 35' (o.g.); Winkler 99', 118'	Attendance: 5,200; Referee: Florian Meyer (Braunschweig)

29 August 1998	SC Idar-Oberstein	0 – 1	Arminia Bielefeld	Idar-Oberstein
		Report (in German)	Stratos 69'	Attendance: 4,600; Referee: Kammerer (Karlsruhe)

29 August 1998	FC Denzlingen	0 – 3	Hamburger SV	Denzlingen
		Report (in German)	Yeboah 54'; Groth 83'; Spörl 88' (pen.)	Attendance: 4,100; Referee: Franz-Xaver Wack (Biberbach)

29 August 1998	Waldhof Mannheim	1 – 5	Borussia Mönchengladbach	Mannheim
	Mallam 65'	Report (in German)	Polster 5'; Pettersson 18', 57'; Ketelaer 82'; Mallam 88' (o.g.)	Attendance: 15,000; Referee: Sippel (Würzburg)

29 August 1998	1. FC Köln	0 – 1	Hansa Rostock	Cologne
		Report (in German)	Majak 55'	Stadium: Müngersdorfer Stadion; Attendance: 11,000; Referee: Wagner (Hofheim)

29 August 1998	Energie Cottbus (A)	0 – 1	SpVgg Greuther Fürth	Cottbus
		Report (in German)	Schmidt 90'	Attendance: 1,000; Referee: Matthias Anklam (Buchholz in der Nordheide)

29 August 1998	1. FC Magdeburg	1 – 2	KFC Uerdingen 05	Magdeburg
	Hannemann 15'	Report (in German)	Spizak 58'; Scherbe 81' (pen.)	Attendance: 3,200; Referee: Olaf Blumenstein (Berlin)

29 August 1998	Lichterfelder SU	0 – 6	Schalke 04	Berlin
		Report (in German)	Eigenrauch 11'; Max 16'; Kmetsch 27'; Hami 54', 65'; Anderbrügge 77'	Attendance: 4,000; Referee: Peter Gagelmann (Berlin)

29 August 1998	VfL Osnabrück	0 – 2	1. FC Nürnberg	Osnabrück
		Report (in German)	Ćirić 33'; Bürger 90'	Stadium: Stadion an der Bremer Brücke; Attendance: 7,000; Referee: Wolfgang Friedrichs (Lennestadt)

30 August 1998	Post/Süd Regensburg	0 – 2	Hertha BSC	Regensburg
		Report (in German)	Sverrisson 36'; Tretschok 56'	Attendance: 4,500; Referee: Lange (Herrenburg)

30 August 1998	SV Meppen	0 – 1	FC St. Pauli	Meppen
		Report (in German)	Maxhuni 59' (pen.)	Stadium: Emslandstadion; Attendance: 4,600; Referee: Hellmut Krug (Gelsenkirchen)

30 August 1998	FSV Zwickau	2 – 5	VfL Bochum	Zwickau
	Milde 49' (pen.), 82'	Report (in German)	Peschel 40'; Fahrenhorst 48'; Michalke 54'; Reis 66' (pen.), 90'	Stadium: Westsachsenstadion; Attendance: 4,300; Referee: Michael Wendorf (Glienicke)

30 August 1998	FC Rot-Weiß Erfurt	1 – 6	Eintracht Frankfurt	Erfurt
	Scheller 89'	Report (in German)	Sobotzik 45'; Pisont 61'; Yang 72'; Gebhardt 78'; Westerthaler 80', 84'	Stadium: Steigerwaldstadion; Attendance: 11,000; Referee: Lutz Michael Fröhlich (Berlin)

30 August 1998	LR Ahlen	0 – 5	Bayern Munich	Ahlen
		Report (in German)	Effenberg 22' (pen.), 37'; Jancker 34'; Helmer 44'; Fink 73'	Attendance: 12,000; Referee: Jürgen Aust (Cologne)

30 August 1998	Fortuna Köln	1 – 3	1. FC Kaiserslautern	Cologne
	Younga-Mouhani 45'	Report (in German)	Rösler 11'; Marschall 72', 90'	Attendance: 6,500; Referee: Hartmut Strampe (Handorf)

=== Second round ===
17 September 1998	Energie Cottbus	2 – 4	Borussia Mönchengladbach	Cottbus
	Heidrich 14', 87' (pen.)	Report (in German)	Polster 10'; Pflipsen 79', 90'; Ketelaer 86'	Stadium: Stadion der Freundschaft; Attendance: 11,400; Referee: Lutz Wagner (Kniftel)

17 September 1998	Hamburger SV	4 – 0	SpVgg Unterhaching	Hamburg
	Kiriakov 23'; Yeboah 52'; Hollerbach 73'; Strehmel 88' (o.g.)	Report (in German)		Stadium: Volksparkstadion; Attendance: 11,000; Referee: Georg Dardenne (Nettersheim)

22 September 1998	Sportfreunde Eisbachtal	1 – 4	Rot-Weiss Oberhausen	Nentershausen
	Wagner 69'	Report (in German)	Weber 40', 81'; Bieber 43'; Adriano 81'	Attendance: 2,500; Referee: Jörg Keßler (Höhenkirchen)

22 September 1998	Tennis Borussia Berlin	4 – 2	Stuttgarter Kickers	Berlin
	Kovacec 23', 26'; Copado 60'; Aračić 77'	Report (in German)	Carl 7'; Winkler 63'	Stadium: Mommsenstadion; Attendance: 11,000; Referee: Alfons Berg (Konz)

22 September 1998	Bayer Leverkusen	1 – 1 (a.e.t.) (3–4 p)	Hertha BSC	Leverkusen
	Rink 25'	Report (in German)	Preetz 24'	Stadium: BayArena; Attendance: 16,000; Referee: Hartmut Strampe (Handorf)
	Penalties
	Kirsten (penalty missed); Heintze (penalty scored); Mamić (penalty scored); Rink (penalty scored); Beinlich (penalty missed)		Rekdal (penalty scored); Thom (penalty missed); Veit (penalty scored); Tretschok (penalty scored); Preetz (penalty scored)

22 September 1998	VfB Stuttgart	3 – 2	Eintracht Frankfurt	Stuttgart
	Đorđević 17'; Lisztes 45'; Spanring 90'	Report (in German)	Schneider 48', 50'	Stadium: Gottlieb-Daimler-Stadion; Attendance: 8,000; Referee: Hellmut Krug (Gelsenkirchen)

22 September 1998	Werder Bremen	3 – 2	Hansa Rostock	Bremen
	Trares 52'; Maximov 57'; Frey 72'	Report (in German)	Bičanić 81'; Majak 90'	Stadium: Weserstadion; Attendance: 9,600; Referee: Markus Merk (Otterbach)

22 September 1998	1. FC Kaiserslautern	1 – 1 (a.e.t.) (4–5 p)	VfL Bochum	Kaiserslautern
	Rösler 6'	Report (in German)	Petrović 58'	Stadium: Betzenberg; Attendance: 23,200; Referee: Winfried Buchhart (Schrobenhausen)
	Penalties
	Schjønberg (penalty missed); Rische (penalty scored); Marschall (penalty scored); Ballack (penalty scored); Ibrahim (penalty scored); Riedl (penalty missed)		Sundermann (penalty scored); Baştürk (penalty missed); Petrović (penalty scored); Dzafič (penalty scored); Hofmann (penalty scored); Schindzielorz (penalty scored)

22 September 1998	Arminia Bielefeld	2 – 1	SG Wattenscheid 09	Bielefeld
	Labbadia 70'; Bagheri 79'	Report (in German)	Feinbier 66'	Stadium: Bielefelder Alm; Attendance: 6,500; Referee: Hans-Jürgen Weber (Bielefeld)

22 September 1998	Fortuna Düsseldorf	2 – 1	1860 Munich	Düsseldorf
	Pizarro 24'; Tare 81'	Report (in German)	Ouakili 31'	Stadium: Rheinstadion; Attendance: 7,000; Referee: Edgar Steinborn (Sinzig)

23 September 1998	Sportfreunde Siegen	1 – 0	SC Freiburg	Siegen
	Kuci 24'	Report (in German)		Stadium: Leimbachstadion; Attendance: 10,800; Referee: Jürgen Aust (Cologne)

23 September 1998	Carl Zeiss Jena	1 – 2	MSV Duisburg	Jena
	Noll 40' (pen.)	Report (in German)	Neun 44'; Beierle 90'	Stadium: Ernst-Abbe-Sportfeld; Attendance: 2,900; Referee: Helmut Fleischer (Ulm)

23 September 1998	VfL Wolfsburg	3 – 0 (a.e.t.)	1. FC Nürnberg	Wolfsburg
	Juskowiak 101'; Präger 110', 115'	Report (in German)		Attendance: 7,200; Referee: Herbert Fandel (Kyllburg)

23 September 1998	SpVgg Greuther Fürth	0 – 0 (a.e.t.) (3–4 p)	Bayern Munich	Fürth
		Report (in German)		Attendance: 31,000; Referee: Jürgen Jansen (Essen)
	Penalties
	Van Lent (penalty scored); Probst (penalty scored); Felgenhauer (penalty missed); Eberl (penalty scored); Skarabela (penalty missed)		Strunz (penalty scored); Salihamidžić (penalty scored); Tarnat (penalty scored); Fink (penalty missed); Effenberg (penalty scored)

23 September 1998	KFC Uerdingen 05	1 – 1 (a.e.t.) (5–4 p)	FC St. Pauli	Krefeld
	Smejkal 68'	Report (in German)	Marin 5'	Stadium: Grotenburg-Stadion; Attendance: 31,000; Referee: Bernhard Zerr (Ottersweier)
	Penalties
	Smejkal (penalty scored); Nacev (penalty scored); Spizak (penalty scored); Grauer (penalty missed); Scherbe (penalty scored); Von Ahlen (penalty scored)		Trulsen (penalty scored); Stanislawski (penalty scored); Seeliger (penalty missed); Savichev (penalty scored); Marin (penalty scored); Hanke (penalty missed)

23 September 1998	Borussia Dortmund	1 – 0 (a.e.t.)	Schalke 04	Dortmund
	Salou 98'	Report (in German)		Stadium: Westfalenstadion; Attendance: 60,000; Referee: Bernd Heynemann (Magdeburg)

=== Round of 16 ===
27 October 1998	VfL Wolfsburg	3 – 1	Arminia Bielefeld	Wolfsburg
	Präger 8'; Boy 49' (o.g.); Akonnor 85'	Report (in German)	Reina 28'	Attendance: 6,400; Referee: Torsten Koop (Lüttenmark)

27 October 1998	VfB Stuttgart	3 – 1	Borussia Dortmund	Stuttgart
	Akpoborie 71'; Rost 83', 85'	Report (in German)	Häßler 90' (pen.)	Stadium: Gottlieb-Daimler-Stadion; Attendance: 21,500; Referee: Georg Dardenne (Nettersheim)

27 October 1998	VfL Bochum	0 – 1	Borussia Mönchengladbach	Bochum
		Report (in German)	Polster 10'	Attendance: 21,500; Referee: Edgar Steinborn (Sinzig)

27 October 1998	Rot-Weiss Oberhausen	3 – 3 (a.e.t.) (4–3 p)	Hamburger SV	Oberhausen
	Weber 9', 52'; Pröpper 43'	Report (in German)	Dembinski 7', 66'; Groth 79'	Stadium: Niederrheinsstadion; Attendance: 7,100; Referee: Frank Gettke (Haltern)
	Penalties
	Konjević (penalty missed); Judt (penalty scored); Toborg (penalty scored); Quallo (penalty missed); Luginger (penalty scored); Ciuca (penalty scored)		Groth (penalty scored); Grubač (penalty scored); Yeboah (penalty missed); Dembiński (penalty missed); Butt (penalty scored); Ernst (penalty missed)

28 October 1998	Tennis Borussia Berlin	4 – 2	Hertha BSC	Berlin
	Aračić 32', 59'; Copado 41'; Kovacec 57'	Report (in German)	Thom 12'; Tchami 68'	Stadium: Olympiastadion; Attendance: 40,100; Referee: Jürgen Jansen (Essen)

28 October 1998	Werder Bremen	3 – 2	Fortuna Düsseldorf	Bremen
	Frings 17', 66'; Maximov 50'	Report (in German)	Dobrovolski 30'; Pizarro 86'	Stadium: Weserstadion; Attendance: 8,400; Referee: Sippel (Würzburg)

28 October 1998	MSV Duisburg	2 – 4	Bayern Munich	Duisburg
	Beierle 37', 50'	Report (in German)	Giovane Élber 56', 60'; Jeremies 76'; Lizarazu 89'	Stadium: Wedaustadion; Attendance: 23,000; Referee: Bernhard Zerr (Ottersweier)

3 November 1998	Sportfreunde Siegen	1 – 0	KFC Uerdingen 05	Siegen
	Cirba 75'	Report (in German)		Stadium: Leimbachstadion; Attendance: 8,000; Referee: Christian Schößling (Leipzig)

=== Quarter-finals ===
1 December 1998	Bayern Munich	3 – 0	VfB Stuttgart	Munich
	Jancker 26'; Basler 71'; Zickler 78'	Report (in German)		Stadium: Olympiastadion; Attendance: 11,000; Referee: Hartmut Strampe (Handorf)

2 December 1998	Sportfreunde Siegen	1 – 3	VfL Wolfsburg	Siegen
	Cirba 22'	Report (in German)	Juskowiak 6', 45'; Reyna 63'	Stadium: Leimbachstadion; Attendance: 14,600; Referee: Stefan Weber (Eisenach)

2 December 1998	Rot-Weiss Oberhausen	2 – 0	Borussia Mönchengladbach	Oberhausen
	Toborg 71'; Weber 80'	Report (in German)		Attendance: 19,000; Referee: Lutz Michael Fröhlich (Berlin)

2 December 1998	Werder Bremen	2 – 1 (a.e.t.)	Tennis Borussia Berlin	Bremen
	Flo 86'; Wojtala 107'	Report (in German)	Kovacec 10'	Stadium: Weserstadion; Attendance: 9,900; Referee: Hermann Albrecht (Kaufbeuren)

=== Semi-finals ===
10 March 1999	Rot-Weiss Oberhausen	1 – 3	Bayern Munich	Gelsenkirchen
	Scheinhardt 85' (pen.)	Report (in German)	Jancker 24'; Effenberg 42'; Linke 79'	Stadium: Parkstadion; Attendance: 47,300; Referee: Herbert Fandel (Kyllburg)

10 March 1999	VfL Wolfsburg	0 – 1	Werder Bremen	Wolfsburg
		Report (in German)	Bode 52'	Stadium: VfL-Stadion; Attendance: 19,900; Referee: Markus Merk (Otterbach)

=== Final ===
12 June 1999
19:30 CEST

Bayern Munich	1–1 (a.e.t.)	Werder Bremen
Jancker 45'	Report	Maksymov 4'
Penalties
Salihamidžić (penalty scored); Daei (penalty scored); Tarnat (penalty scored); Jancker (penalty scored); Effenberg (penalty missed); Matthäus (penalty missed)	4–5	(penalty scored) Bode; (penalty missed) Todt; (penalty scored) Bogdanović; (penalty scored) Wicky; (penalty scored) Eilts; (penalty scored) Rost

Olympiastadion, Berlin
Attendance: 75,841
Referee: Jürgen Aust (Cologne)
