= 2014–15 Regionalliga =

7th season of the Regionalliga

Regionalliga
- Season: 2014–15
- Champions: Werder Bremen II; 1. FC Magdeburg; Borussia Mönchengladbach II; Kickers Offenbach; Würzburger Kickers
- Promoted: Werder Bremen II; 1. FC Magdeburg; Würzburger Kickers
- Relegated: FT Braunschweig; VfR Neumünster; FC Hennef 05; Sportfreunde Siegen; KFC Uerdingen 05; SVN Zweibrücken; KSV Baunatal; TuS Koblenz; FC Nöttingen; Eintracht Bamberg; SV Seligenporten; VfR Garching; SV Heimstetten; Demoted to NOFV-Oberliga: VFC Plauen; Withdrawn: Union Berlin II; VfL Bochum II

The 2014–15 Regionalliga was the seventh season of the Regionalliga, the third under the new format, as the fourth tier of the German football league system. The champions of Regionalliga West – Fortuna Köln – and the winner – SG Sonnenhof Großaspach – and third-placed team - FSV Mainz 05 II - of the Regionalliga Südwest were promoted to the 3. Liga. SV Elversberg, Wacker Burghausen and Saarbrücken were relegated from 3. Liga.

== Regionalliga Nord ==
18 teams from the states of Bremen, Hamburg, Lower Saxony and Schleswig-Holstein competed in the third season of the reformed Regionalliga Nord. 15 teams were retained from the last season and 3 teams were promoted from the Oberliga – Niedersachsenliga champions Lüneburger SK Hansa and the two Regionalliga North promotion playoff winners VfB Lübeck and FT Braunschweig.

=== League table ===
Pos	Team	Pld	W	D	L	GF	GA	GD	Pts	Qualification or relegation
1	Werder Bremen II (C, P)	34	19	10	5	84	39	+45	67	Qualification to promotion play-offs
2	VfL Wolfsburg II	34	19	7	8	74	40	+34	64	
3	Hamburger SV II	34	19	5	10	74	41	+33	62	
4	TSV Havelse	34	16	7	11	49	35	+14	55	
5	ETSV Weiche	34	14	10	10	53	37	+16	52	
6	Eintracht Norderstedt	34	16	4	14	47	56	−9	52	
7	VfB Lübeck	34	12	14	8	43	44	−1	50	
8	SV Meppen	34	13	10	11	50	47	+3	49	
9	FC St. Pauli II	34	12	11	11	39	43	−4	47	
10	VfB Oldenburg	34	12	9	13	39	44	−5	45	
11	BSV Schwarz-Weiß Rehden	34	10	14	10	46	48	−2	44	
12	Lüneburger SK Hansa	34	11	10	13	41	55	−14	43	
13	Eintracht Braunschweig II	34	10	12	12	59	56	+3	42	
14	Hannover 96 II	34	11	8	15	52	48	+4	41	
15	Goslarer SC 08	34	10	9	15	50	60	−10	39	
16	BV Cloppenburg	34	10	9	15	44	59	−15	39	
17	VfR Neumünster (R)	34	8	9	17	37	60	−23	33	Relegation to Oberliga
18	FT Braunschweig (R)	34	2	6	26	22	91	−69	12	Relegation to Oberliga

Source: kicker.de
Rules for classification: 1) points; 2) goal difference; 3) number of goals scored.
(C) Champions; (P) Promoted; (R) Relegated

== Regionalliga Nordost ==
16 teams from the states of Berlin, Brandenburg, Mecklenburg-Vorpommern, Saxony, Saxony-Anhalt and Thuringia competed in the third season of the reformed Regionalliga Nordost. 13 teams were retained from the last season and 2 teams that were promoted from the Oberliga. BFC Dynamo qualified by winning NOFV-Oberliga Nord and Bautzen qualified by winning NOFV-Oberliga Süd.

=== League table ===
Pos	Team	Pld	W	D	L	GF	GA	GD	Pts	Qualification or relegation
1	1. FC Magdeburg (C, P)	28	19	3	6	61	22	+39	60	Qualification to promotion play-offs
2	FSV Zwickau	28	16	9	3	45	21	+24	57	
3	Wacker Nordhausen	28	14	6	8	43	38	+5	48	
4	Carl Zeiss Jena	28	12	9	7	46	38	+8	45	
5	BFC Dynamo	28	11	12	5	34	26	+8	45	
6	Hertha BSC II	28	12	6	10	50	41	+9	42	
7	Berliner AK 07	28	13	3	12	36	35	+1	42	
8	TSG Neustrelitz	28	11	5	12	46	41	+5	38	
9	Germania Halberstadt	28	11	4	13	43	44	−1	37	
10	Union Berlin II	28	11	3	14	49	49	0	36	Withdrawn at end of season (Note: Union Berlin folded their under-23 team at the end of this season, so no team was relegated. The league expanded to 18 teams next season.)
11	SV Babelsberg 03	28	7	10	11	32	34	−2	31	
12	VfB Auerbach	28	9	4	15	28	56	−28	31	
13	Budissa Bautzen	28	6	9	13	23	40	−17	27	
14	ZFC Meuselwitz	28	5	7	16	27	52	−25	22	
15	Viktoria 1889 Berlin	28	4	8	16	25	51	−26	20	
16	VFC Plauen (R)	0	0	0	0	0	0	0	0	Demoted to Oberliga after insolvency (Note: On 1 January 2015, insolvency proceedings were opened against VFC Plauen. Subsequently, they were placed into administration and all their results and records were expunged.)

Source: kicker.de
Rules for classification: 1) points; 2) goal difference; 3) number of goals scored.
(C) Champions; (P) Promoted; (R) Relegated

== Regionalliga West ==
18 teams from North Rhine-Westphalia competed in the third season of the reformed Regionalliga West: 15 teams were retained from the last season. FC Kray won Oberliga Niederrhein and Hennef the Oberliga Mittelrhein. Rödinghausen placed second in the Oberliga Westfalen although Arminia Bielefeld II won the competition but was unable to be promoted as the first team played in the 3. Liga.

=== League table ===
Pos	Team	Pld	W	D	L	GF	GA	GD	Pts	Qualification or relegation
1	Borussia Mönchengladbach II (C)	34	21	6	7	77	43	+34	69	Qualification to promotion play-offs
2	Alemannia Aachen	34	19	11	4	56	20	+36	68	
3	Viktoria Köln	34	19	9	6	70	29	+41	66	
4	Rot-Weiß Oberhausen	34	15	12	7	54	37	+17	57	
5	Rot-Weiss Essen	34	16	8	10	58	38	+20	56	
6	Sportfreunde Lotte	34	13	15	6	55	34	+21	54	
7	SC Verl	34	15	9	10	53	32	+21	54	
8	SV Rödinghausen	34	14	7	13	48	44	+4	49	
9	Fortuna Düsseldorf II	34	14	7	13	39	52	−13	49	
10	1. FC Köln II	34	11	9	14	38	47	−9	42	
11	FC Schalke 04 II	34	10	11	13	38	41	−3	41	
12	SC Wiedenbrück 2000	34	11	7	16	39	54	−15	40	
13	SG Wattenscheid 09	34	11	6	17	42	58	−16	39	
14	FC Kray	34	9	12	13	39	61	−22	39	
15	KFC Uerdingen 05 (R)	34	8	10	16	34	63	−29	34	Relegation to Oberliga
16	VfL Bochum II	34	8	6	20	46	58	−12	30	Withdrew at end of season
17	Sportfreunde Siegen (R)	34	7	9	18	33	56	−23	30	Relegation to Oberliga
18	FC Hennef 05 (R)	34	3	9	22	26	80	−54	18	Relegation to Oberliga

Source: kicker.de
Rules for classification: 1) points; 2) goal difference; 3) number of goals scored.
(C) Champions; (R) Relegated

== Regionalliga Südwest ==
18 teams from Baden-Württemberg, Hesse, Rhineland-Palatinate and Saarland competed in the third season of the Regionalliga Südwest. Elversberg and Saarbrücken relegated from the 3. Liga. 13 teams were retained from last season and 3 teams were promoted from the Oberliga: Astoria Walldorf won the Oberliga Baden-Württemberg and Pirmasens won the Oberliga Rheinland-Pfalz/Saar. As no team from the Hessenliga applied for a licence, the second-placed teams of the other Oberligas had a play-off match which was won by Nöttingen.

=== League table ===
Pos	Team	Pld	W	D	L	GF	GA	GD	Pts	Qualification or relegation
1	Kickers Offenbach (C)	34	24	7	3	55	22	+33	79	Qualification to promotion play-offs
2	1. FC Saarbrücken	34	21	6	7	51	27	+24	69	Qualification to promotion play-offs
3	SV Elversberg	34	20	5	9	60	28	+32	65	
4	1. FC Kaiserslautern II	34	18	7	9	57	28	+29	61	
5	Wormatia Worms	34	18	4	12	59	44	+15	58	
6	FC 08 Homburg	34	16	9	9	48	31	+17	57	
7	SC Freiburg II	34	15	8	11	66	46	+20	53	
8	Astoria Walldorf	34	15	8	11	51	40	+11	53	
9	1899 Hoffenheim II	34	15	6	13	44	46	−2	51	
10	Hessen Kassel	34	13	8	13	43	35	+8	47	
11	Eintracht Trier	34	11	11	12	31	33	−2	44	
12	SpVgg Neckarelz	34	13	5	16	47	55	−8	44	
13	Waldhof Mannheim	34	11	10	13	36	33	+3	43	
14	FK Pirmasens	34	11	9	14	40	44	−4	42	
15	FC Nöttingen (R)	34	11	4	19	50	67	−17	37	Relegation to Oberliga
16	TuS Koblenz (R)	34	6	7	21	24	58	−34	25	Relegation to Oberliga
17	KSV Baunatal (R)	34	5	1	28	22	82	−60	16	Relegation to Oberliga
18	SVN Zweibrücken (R)	34	4	3	27	17	82	−65	15	Relegation to Oberliga

Source: kicker.de
Rules for classification: 1) points; 2) goal difference; 3) number of goals scored.
(C) Champions; (R) Relegated

== Regionalliga Bayern ==
18 teams from Bavaria competed in the third season of the Regionalliga Bayern. 13 teams were retained from the last season. Wacker Burghausen relegated from the 3. Liga. 2 teams were promoted from the Bayernliga. Bayreuth won Bayernliga Nord and Garching - runner-up of the Bayernliga Süd - gained promotion due to the withdrawal from competition of BC Aichach.

=== League table ===
Pos	Team	Pld	W	D	L	GF	GA	GD	Pts	Qualification or relegation
1	Würzburger Kickers (C, P)	34	24	8	2	67	15	+52	80	Qualification to promotion play-offs and DFB-Pokal
2	Bayern Munich II	34	22	6	6	60	28	+32	72	
3	1860 München II	34	19	6	9	60	34	+26	63	
4	TSV Buchbach	34	14	12	8	47	41	+6	54	
5	FC Ingolstadt 04 II	34	13	11	10	47	39	+8	50	
6	SpVgg Bayreuth	34	14	8	12	48	47	+1	50	
7	FC Memmingen	34	12	11	11	45	51	−6	47	
8	1. FC Nürnberg II	34	12	10	12	39	39	0	46	
9	FV Illertissen	34	12	9	13	56	55	+1	45	
10	FC Augsburg II	34	11	12	11	41	47	−6	45	
11	Wacker Burghausen	34	11	9	14	36	43	−7	42	
12	SV Schalding-Heining	34	10	10	14	43	52	−9	40	
13	1. FC Schweinfurt 05	34	10	9	15	46	55	−9	39	
14	SpVgg Greuther Fürth II	34	10	8	16	47	50	−3	38	
15	SV Heimstetten (R)	34	8	10	16	40	58	−18	34	Qualification to relegation play-offs
16	VfR Garching (R)	34	8	9	17	42	64	−22	33	Qualification to relegation play-offs
17	SV Seligenporten (R)	34	6	10	18	34	61	−27	28	Relegation to Bayernliga
18	Eintracht Bamberg (R)	34	4	14	16	38	57	−19	26	Relegation to Bayernliga

Source: kicker.de
Rules for classification: 1) points; 2) goal difference; 3) goals scored; 4) head-to-head goal difference; 5) head-to-head away goals scored; 6) goals scored away from home; 7) drawing of lots
(C) Champions; (P) Promoted; (R) Relegated

== Promotion play-offs ==
The draw for the 2014–15 promotion play-offs was held on 12 April, with another draw between the Regionalliga Südwest teams held on 2 May 2015.

=== Summary ===
The first legs were played on 27 May, and the second legs were played on 31 May 2015.

Team 1	Agg.	Team 2	1st leg	2nd leg
1. FC Saarbrücken (S2)	1–1 (5–6 p)	Würzburger Kickers (B)	0–1	1–0 (a.e.t.)
1. FC Magdeburg (NO)	4–1	Kickers Offenbach (S1)	1–0	3–1
Werder Bremen II (N)	2–0	Borussia Mönchengladbach II (W)	0–0	2–0 (a.e.t.)

=== Matches ===
All times Central European Summer Time (UTC+2)

27 May 2015
19:00

1. FC Saarbrücken	0–1	Würzburger Kickers
	Report	Herzig 37'

Ludwigsparkstadion, Saarbrücken
Attendance: 10,247
Referee: Sven Jablonski
31 May 2015
14:00

Würzburger Kickers	0–1 (a.e.t.)	1. FC Saarbrücken
	Report	Luz 61' (pen.)
Penalties
Haller (penalty scored); Jabiri (penalty missed); Bieber (penalty scored); Demirtaş (penalty scored); Weißenberger (penalty scored); Schoppenhauer (penalty scored); Nothnagel (penalty scored)	6–5	(penalty scored) Mendy; (penalty scored) Wegner; (penalty scored) Fießer; (penalty missed) Luz; (penalty scored) Hahn; (penalty scored) Sauter; (penalty missed) Döringer

Stadion am Dallenberg, Würzburg
Attendance: 10,500
Referee: Patrick Ittrich

1–1 on aggregate. Würzburger Kickers won 6–5 on penalties.

27 May 2015
19:00

1. FC Magdeburg	1–0	Kickers Offenbach
Hebisch 40'	Report

MDCC-Arena, Magdeburg
Attendance: 23,139
Referee: Martin Thomsen
31 May 2015
14:00

Kickers Offenbach	1–3	1. FC Magdeburg
Mangafic 24'	Report	Schiller 31'; Fuchs 36'; Hebisch 53'

Sparda-Bank-Hessen-Stadion, Offenbach
Attendance: 18,500
Referee: Norbert Grudzinski

1. FC Magdeburg won 4–1 on aggregate.

27 May 2015
19:00

Werder Bremen II	0–0	Borussia Mönchengladbach II
	Report

Weserstadion Platz 11, Bremen
Attendance: 3,785
Referee: René Rohde
31 May 2015
14:00

Borussia Mönchengladbach II	0–2 (a.e.t.)	Werder Bremen II
	Report	Mainka 109'; Ayçiçek 119'

Borussia-Park, Mönchengladbach
Attendance: 10,217
Referee: Robert Kampka

Werder Bremen II won 2–0 on aggregate.
