= 2000–01 SV Werder Bremen season =

SV Werder Bremen
2000–01 season
- Manager: Thomas Schaaf
- Stadium: Weser-Stadion
- Bundesliga: 7th
- DFB-Pokal: Second round
- UEFA Cup: Third round
- Top goalscorer: League: Claudio Pizarro (19); All: Claudio Pizarro (23)
- Average home league attendance: 30,341
Home colours

During the 2000–01 season, SV Werder Bremen played in the 1. Bundesliga, the highest tier of the German football league system.

== Season summary ==
Werder Bremen's progress under Thomas Schaaf continued and they climbed to 7th place in the final Bundesliga table.

== First team squad ==
Squad at end of season

No.	Pos.	Nation	Player
1	GK	GER	Frank Rost
2	DF	GER	Fabian Ernst
5	MF	GER	Dieter Eilts
6	MF	GER	Frank Baumann
7	MF	UKR	Yuriy Maksymov
8	DF	GER	Bernhard Trares
9	FW	YUG	Rade Bogdanović (Note: Bogdanović was born in Sarajevo, SFR Yugoslavia (now Bosnia and Herzegovina), but also qualified to represent Yugoslavia internationally after Bosnia and Herzegovina's independence and made his international debut for Yugoslavia in 1997.)
10	FW	PER	Claudio Pizarro
11	MF	CRO	Ivica Banović
12	GK	GER	Stefan Brasas
13	DF	GER	Andree Wiedener
14	DF	NED	Frank Verlaat
15	DF	GER	Dieter Frey
16	GK	GER	Pascal Borel
17	MF	GER	Marco Bode

No.	Pos.	Nation	Player
18	MF	AUT	Andi Herzog
19	DF	UKR	Viktor Skrypnyk
20	DF	YUG	Mladen Krstajić (Note: Krstajić was born in Zenica, SFR Yugoslavia (now Bosnia and Herzegovina), but also qualified to represent Yugoslavia internationally after Bosnia and Herzegovina's independence and made his international debut for Serbia and Montenegro in 1999.)
21	FW	KOR	Lee Dong-gook (on loan from Pohang Steelers)
22	MF	GER	Torsten Frings
23	MF	GER	Christoph Dabrowski
24	MF	GER	Tim Borowski
28	MF	NAM	Razundara Tjikuzu
30	FW	GER	Enrico Kern
32	FW	BRA	Aílton
33	DF	GER	Mike Barten
35	DF	CAN	Paul Stalteri
38	DF	GER	Björn Schierenbeck
39	MF	GER	Danny Fütterer

=== Left club during season ===
Note: Flags indicate national team as defined under FIFA eligibility rules; some limited exceptions apply. Players may hold more than one non-FIFA nationality.

No. / Pos. / Nation / Player; 3 / MF / SUI / Raphaël Wicky (to Atlético Madrid)	No. / Pos. / Nation / Player; 4 / MF / GER / Dirk Flock (to Arminia Bielefeld)
