= Yuriy Maksymov =

Ukrainian footballer (born 1968)

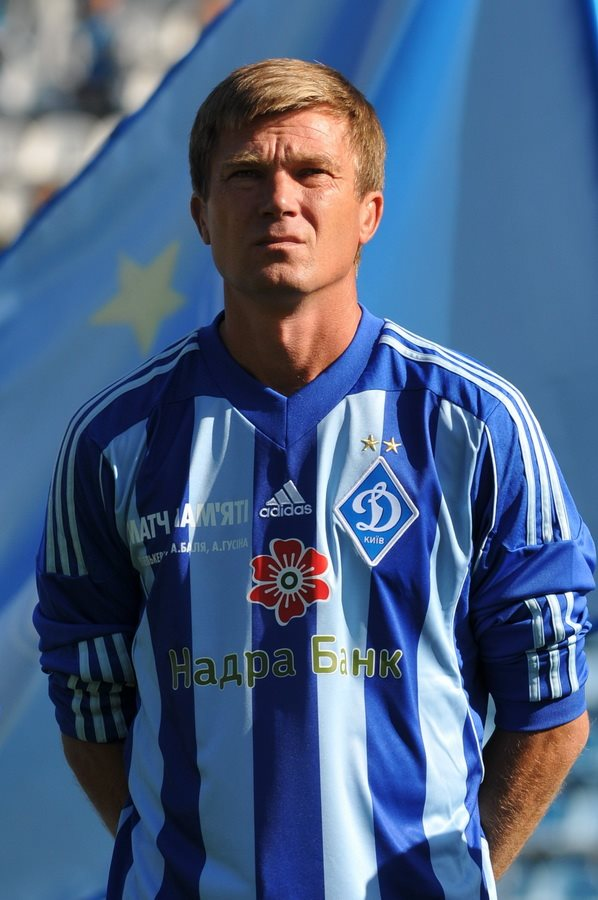
- Maksymov during a match in memory of Byalkevich, Bal, and Husin in 2014

Personal information
- Full name: Yuriy Vilyovych Maksymov
- Date of birth: 8 December 1968 (age 57)
- Place of birth: Kherson, Ukrainian SSR, Soviet Union
- Height: 1.87 m (6 ft 2 in)
- Position: Midfielder

Youth career
- Krystal Kherson

Senior career*
Years	Team	Apps	(Gls)
1986	Krystal Kherson	1	(0)
1988	SKChF Sevastopol		
1989	Krystal Kherson	7	(1)
1989–1990	Tavriya Simferopol	49	(5)
1991	Krystal Kherson	48	(27)
1992–1994	Dnipro Dnipropetrovsk	84	(20)
1995–1997	Dynamo Kyiv	65	(23)
1997	→ Dynamo-2 Kyiv	11	(3)
1997–2001	Werder Bremen	69	(9)
2001–2002	Waldhof Mannheim	27	(3)
2003	Rostov	18	(2)
2003–2004	Borysfen Boryspil	8	(4)
2004	→ Boreks-Borysfen Borodianka	1	(0)
2004–2005	Metalurh Zaporizhzhia	9	(1)
Total		396	(98)

International career
1992–2002	Ukraine	27	(5)

Managerial career
- 2005: Dinamo Minsk (assistant)
- 2006: CSKA Kyiv
- 2008–2009: Obolon Kyiv
- 2010–2012: Kryvbas Kryvyi Rih
- 2012–2013: Metalurh Donetsk
- 2013–2014: Mordovia Saransk
- 2016–2017: Taraz
- 2017–2018: Keşla
- 2019–2022: Vorskla Poltava
- 2023: Zviahel
- 2023–2024: Dnipro-1
- 2024–2025: Vorskla Poltava
- * Club domestic league appearances and goals

Yuriy Vilyovych Maksymov (Ukrainian: Юрій Вільйович Максимов; born 8 December 1968) is a Ukrainian football coach and former player. A former midfielder, his career achievements saw him inducted into the Viktor Leonenko Hall of Fame in March 2012.

== Club career ==
Born in Kherson, Ukrainian SSR, Soviet Union, Maksymov played for Valery Lobanovsky's Dynamo Kyiv in his native Ukraine. In November 1997 he moved to Germany joining Bundesliga club Werder Bremen, signing a contract until 2001. He was seen as a replacement for the injured playmaker Andi Herzog. The transfer fee paid to Dynamo Kyiv was reported as DM 3.5 or 3.6 million (€1.79 or 1.84 million). Whilst at Werder Bremen he helped them win the 1998–99 DFB-Pokal, starting in the final against Bayern Munich and scoring as the match finished 1–1 before Werder Bremen won on penalties. Having featured sporadically in the 2000–01 season, Maksymov left Werder Bremen for 2. Bundesliga side Waldhof Mannheim on a free transfer in 2001, along with Bernhard Trares. He signed a two-year contract. In the top two divisions of the German league pyramid he scored twelve goals in 96 matches for Bremen and Mannheim.

He later returned to Russia and Ukraine to finish his career at FC Rostov and FC Metalurh Zaporizhzhya.

== International career ==
Maksymov earned 27 caps playing for the Ukraine national team scoring five goals.

== Managerial career ==
Before taking charge of Obolon Kyiv in June 2008, Maksymov was in charge of CSKA Kyiv. After CSKA Kyiv was relegated to the Second League, Maksymov resigned.

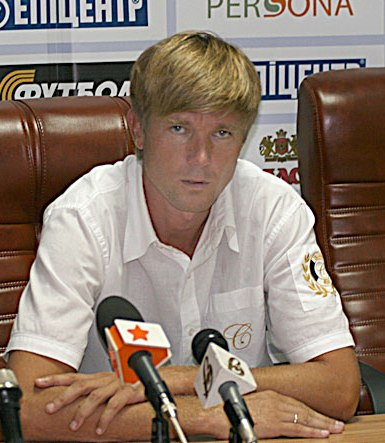
Maksymov in 2010

=== Kryvbas Kryvyi Rih ===
In January 2010, he became manager of Kryvbas Kryvyi Rih.

=== Keşla ===
On 25 December 2017, Maksymov was appointed as manager of Keshla FK.

== Coach career ==
On September 23, 2026, Yuriy Maksimov was appointed head coach of FC "Araz-Nakhchivan".

== Career statistics ==
=== Club ===
Appearances and goals by club, season and competition
Club	Season	League			Cup		Continental		Other		Total		Ref.
Club	Season	Division	Apps	Goals	Apps	Goals	Apps	Goals	Apps	Goals	Apps	Goals	Ref.
Werder Bremen	1997–98	Bundesliga	12	3	0	0	–		–		12	3	
Werder Bremen	1998–99	Bundesliga	20	3	6	4	4	1	1 (Note: Appearance in 1998 UEFA Intertoto Cup)	0	31	8	
Werder Bremen	1999–2000	Bundesliga	29	3	4	1	8	1	2 (Note: Appearances in 1999 DFB-Ligapokal)	0	43	5	
Werder Bremen	2000–01	Bundesliga	8	0	0	0	3	1	–		11	1	
Werder Bremen	Total		69	9	10	5	15	3	3	0	97	17	–
Waldhof Mannheim	2001–02	2. Bundesliga	16	3	0	0	–		–		16	3	
Waldhof Mannheim	2002–03	2. Bundesliga	11	0	1	0	–		–		12	0	
Waldhof Mannheim	Total		27	3	1	0	0	0	0	0	28	3	–
Career total			96	12	11	5	15	3	3	0	125	20	–

=== International ===
Scores and results list Ukraine's goal tally first, score column indicates score after each Maksymov goal.

List of international goals scored by Yuriy Maksymov
No.	Date	Venue	Opponent	Score	Result	Competition
1	28 October 1992	Dinamo Stadium, Minsk, Belarus	Belarus	1–1	1–1	Friendly match
2	5 October 1996	Olimpiyskyi National Sports Complex, Kyiv, Ukraine	Portugal	2–1	2–1	1998 FIFA World Cup qualification
3	1 May 1996	Olimpiyskyi National Sports Complex, Kyiv, Ukraine	Lithuania	4–2	5–2	Friendly match
4	1 May 1996	Olimpiyskyi National Sports Complex, Kyiv, Ukraine	Lithuania	5–2	5–2	Friendly match
5	11 October 1997	Hrazdan Stadium, Yerevan, Armenia	Armenia	2–0	2–0	1998 FIFA World Cup qualification

== Honours ==
=== Player ===
Dynamo Kyiv

- Ukrainian Premier League: 1994, 1995, 1996
- Cup of Ukraine: 1996

Werder Bremen

- DFB-Pokal: 1998–99
- UEFA Intertoto Cup: 1998

=== Manager ===
Keşla

- Azerbaijan Cup: 2017–18,

Individual

- Ukrainian Premier League Manajer of the Month: September 2020, October 2021
