= Marco Kurth =

German footballer (born 1978)

- Kurth in 2026

Personal information
- Date of birth: 18 August 1978 (age 48)
- Place of birth: Eisleben, East Germany
- Height: 1.78 m (5 ft 10 in)
- Position: Defensive midfielder

Team information
- Current team: Bournemouth (assistant coach)

Youth career
- 1983–1987: SSV Klostermansfeld
- 1987–1990: Dynamo Eisleben
- 1990–1995: Hallescher FC
- 1995–1997: VfB Leipzig

Senior career*
| Years | Team | Apps | (Gls) |
| 1997–2000 | VfB Leipzig | 15 | (1) |
| 2000–2008 | Erzgebirge Aue | 217 | (8) |
| 2008–2012 | Energie Cottbus | 56 | (2) |
| 2012–2013 | 1. FC Magdeburg | 32 | (0) |
| 2013–2014 | 1. FC Magdeburg II | 7 | (1) |
| Total | | 327 | (12) |

Managerial career
- 2013–2017: 1. FC Magdeburg U-17
- 2017–2018: RB Leipzig (youth)
- 2018–2020: RB Leipzig (U17)
- 2020–2021: RB Leipzig (U19)
- 2021–2022: RB Leipzig (assistant)
- 2022–2025: RB Leipzig (assistant)
- 2026–: Bournemouth (assistant)
- * Club domestic league appearances and goals

Marco Kurth (born 18 August 1978) is a German football coach and former player who played as a defensive midfielder. He is assistant coach at Premier League club Bournemouth.

== Career ==
Born in Eisleben, Kurth began to play football with local side SSV Klostermansfeld and later transferred to Dynamo Eisleben. Until 1995 he played as a midfielder for Hallescher FC's youth sides, before moving to VfB Leipzig at age 17. It was there that he debuted in the 2. Bundesliga when he was subbed in for Ronny Kujat in a 2–1 victory over KFC Uerdingen. He would go on to play for the side in seven more matches, but could not prevent their relegation at the end of the season, when the club ranked 15th.

During the summer of 2000, Kurth transferred to FC Erzgebirge Aue where he quickly established himself in the first team. Three years later, he won promotion to the 2. Bundesliga with the club and went on to play in a total of 133 second-tier games for Aue, scoring five goals. He remained a first-team regular and eventually became deputy captain to Jörg Emmerich.

Aue's relegation in 2008 saw Kurth move to FC Energie Cottbus on a free transfer, signing his first contract with a first-tier club. Only a year earlier Kurth had told an interviewer that it was unlikely he would ever play in the Bundesliga. However, he only played in eight matches in his first season with Cottbus which saw them relegated, only breaking into the first team in the 2009–10 season. He extended his contract twice, however, in January 2012 the contract was dissolved with Kurth citing a lack of perspective as the reason.

Kurth joined Magdeburg in January 2012 and soon became team captain. After Magdeburg's defeat in the 2013–14 DFB-Pokal first round he was suspended from the first team and was to only play in the club's reserves. On 7 October 2013, the club announced that Kurth would now also manage their under-17 side.
