= Nelson Pizarro (Chilean footballer) =

Chilean footballer (born 1970)

Personal information
- Full name: Nelson Rodrigo Pizarro Donoso
- Date of birth: 30 January 1970 (age 56)
- Place of birth: Santiago, Chile
- Height: 1.78 m (5 ft 10 in)
- Position: Forward

Youth career
- Universidad Católica

Senior career*
Years	Team	Apps	(Gls)
1989–1991	Universidad Católica	6	(0)
1992	Cobresal	28	(5)
1993	Deportes La Serena	25	(4)
1994–1995	Palestino	50	(16)
1996	Deportes Concepción	17	(2)
1997	Huachipato	11	(0)
1998–1999	Fortuna Düsseldorf	22	(0)
2000	Deportivo Italchacao	16	(0)
Total		175	(27)

International career
1988	Chile U20		
- * Club domestic league appearances and goals

Nelson Rodrigo Pizarro Donoso (born 30 January 1970) is a Chilean former professional footballer who played as a forward for clubs in Chile, Germany and Venezuela.

== Club career ==
A product of Universidad Católica youth system, in Chilean Primera División he also played for Cobresal (1992), Deportes La Serena (1993), Palestino (1994–95), Deportes Concepción (1996) and Huachipato (1997).

In 1998 he moved to Germany and joined Fortuna Düsseldorf in the 2. Bundesliga, managed by Klaus Allofs. He made 22 appearances in the 1998–99 season and two appearances in the DFB-pokal, scoring 2 two goals in the last.

Then, he moved to Venezuela and played for Deportivo Italchacao in the 2000 Torneo Clausura.

== International career ==
Pizarro represented Chile at under-20 level in the 1988 South American Championship

== Personal life ==
After his retirement, he graduated as a lawyer.

== Honours ==
Universidad Católica

- Copa Chile: 1991
