= Jörg Scherbe =

German footballer

Personal information
- Date of birth: 19 October 1977 (age 49)
- Place of birth: Cottbus, East Germany
- Height: 1.80 m (5 ft 11 in)
- Position: Midfielder

Youth career
- Energie Cottbus

Senior career*
| Years | Team | Apps | (Gls) |
| 1996–1999 | KFC Uerdingen 05 | 54 | (7) |
| 1999 | 1860 Munich II | 2 | (0) |
| 2000–2002 | Energie Cottbus | 45 | (0) |
| 2002–2005 | KFC Uerdingen 05 | 73 | (7) |
| 2005–2006 | Rot-Weiß Oberhausen | 22 | (0) |
| 2006–2008 | SV Straelen | 24 | (2) |
| Total | | 220 | (16) |
- * Club domestic league appearances and goals

Jörg Scherbe (born 19 October 1977) is a German former professional footballer who played as a midfielder.

== Career ==
Scherbe made his debut on the professional league level in the 2. Bundesliga for KFC Uerdingen 05 on 25 May 1997 when he came on as a half-time substitute for René Schmidt in a game against Mainz 05. He was sent off later in that game.
