= Dave de Jong =

Dutch football player

Personal information
- Date of birth: 26 April 1975 (age 51)
- Place of birth: Rotterdam, Netherlands
- Position: Defender

Senior career*
Years	Team	Apps	(Gls)
-1997	Willem II	1	(0)
-1999	De Graafschap	15+	(0+)
1999-2000/01	NAC Breda	11	(0)
2000/01-2002/03	K.V. Mechelen	22	(0)
2004-2007	VfL Osnabrück	73	(5)
- SV Babberich
- DZC '68
- * Club domestic league appearances and goals

Dave de Jong (born 26 April 1975 in the Netherlands) is a Dutch retired footballer who played as a defender.

== Career ==
In 2003, trialed with South Korean side Seongnam. However, he was threatened by the intermediary who arranged the trial after expressing desire to leave the trial. Without the Seongman head coach knowing, he left for the Netherlands and had to hide at the airport.
