= Denis Mangafic =

German footballer (born 1989)

Personal information
- Date of birth: 12 December 1989 (age 36)
- Place of birth: Frankfurt, Germany
- Height: 1.75 m (5 ft 9 in)
- Positions: Midfielder; right-back

Youth career
- SV 09 Hofheim
- –2008: SG 01 Hoechst
- Eintracht Frankfurt

Senior career*
Years	Team	Apps	(Gls)
2008–2010	Heracles Almelo	0	(0)
2012–2013	Wehen Wiesbaden	2	(0)
2012–2013	Wehen Wiesbaden II	15	(6)
2013–2015	Kickers Offenbach	45	(1)
2015–2016	FSV Frankfurt	1	(0)
2016–2017	Preußen Münster	8	(0)
2017–2018	Borussia Fulda	12	(3)
2018–2022	FSV Frankfurt	96	(2)
2022–2023	FC Gießen	26	(2)
Total		205	(14)
- * Club domestic league appearances and goals

Denis Mangafic (born 12 December 1989) is a German former footballer who played as a midfielder or right back.
