= Giuseppe Carnevale =

Italian footballer

Personal information
- Date of birth: 29 June 1978 (age 48)
- Place of birth: Stuttgart, West Germany
- Height: 1.75 m (5 ft 9 in)
- Position: Striker

Youth career
- SV Fellbach
- VfB Stuttgart

Senior career*
Years	Team	Apps	(Gls)
1996–1997	VfB Stuttgart II	12	(2)
1997–1998	VfL Sindelfingen	27	(22)
1998–2000	Stuttgarter Kickers II	49	(39)
1998–2002	Stuttgarter Kickers	62	(15)
2002–2003	FC Nöttingen	15	(4)
2003–2004	TSV Schönaich		
2004–2005	Calcio Echterdingen		
2005–2007	VfL Sindelfingen		
2007–2012	TSV Schönaich		
- * Club domestic league appearances and goals

Giuseppe Carnevale (born 29 June 1978) is an Italian former footballer.
