= Stijn Haeldermans =

Belgian footballer (born 1975)

Personal information
- Date of birth: 22 April 1975 (age 51)
- Place of birth: Hasselt, Belgium
- Height: 1.73 m (5 ft 8 in)
- Position: Midfielder

Youth career
- –1986: Zonhoven VV
- 1986–1988: Patro Eisden
- 1988–1994: MVV Maastricht
- 1988–1994: Genk

Senior career*
Years	Team	Apps	(Gls)
1995–1996	MVV Maastricht	22	(2)
1996–1997	Genk	26	(2)
1997–1999	Standard Liège	61	(8)
1999–2000	K.F.C. Lommel S.K.	22	(1)
2000–2002	Fortuna Sittard	57	(0)
2002–2003	K.F.C. Lommel S.K.	21	(3)
2003	Lierse	7	(1)
2003–2004	K. Beringen-Heusden-Zolder	28	(0)
2004–2005	Rot-Weiß Oberhausen	27	(4)
2005–2008	Rot-Weiss Essen	46	(2)
Total		317	(23)
- * Club domestic league appearances and goals

Stijn Haeldermans (born 22 April 1975) is a Belgian former professional footballer who played as a midfielder for Genk, Standard Liège and 2. Bundesliga club Rot-Weiss Essen among others.
