= Ramazan Yıldırım =

Football manager (born 1975)

Personal information
- Date of birth: September 7, 1975 (age 51)
- Place of birth: Peine, West Germany
- Position: Defensive midfielder

Youth career
- MTV Peine
- Arminia Vöhrum
- 1990–1993: Eintracht Braunschweig
- 1993–1994: VfL Wolfsburg

Senior career*
Years	Team	Apps	(Gls)
1994–1996	TuS Celle FC	54	(8)
1996–1998	Sportfreunde Ricklingen	58	(5)
1998–2001	VfB Lübeck	80	(4)
2001–2003	SSV Jahn Regensburg	46	(5)
2003–2005	Rot-Weiss Essen	59	(5)
2005–2007	Kickers Offenbach	39	(0)
2007–2009	Eintracht Braunschweig	36	(0)
Total		372	(27)

Managerial career
- 2009–2011: Eintracht Braunschweig (youth)
- 2011: Rot-Weiss Essen II
- 2011–2012: VfB Lübeck
- 2013–2014: Sportfreunde Lotte
- * Club domestic league appearances and goals

Ramazan Yıldırım (born 7 September 1975) is a former footballer and manager. Born in Germany, he is of Turkish descent.

== Career ==
As a player, Yıldırım spent three seasons in the 2. Bundesliga with Rot-Weiss Essen and Kickers Offenbach, as well as one season in the 3. Liga with Eintracht Braunschweig.

== Coaching career ==
After retiring as a player Yıldırım became a youth coach at Eintracht Braunschweig. He was sacked by the club in January 2011 and subsequently took over Rot-Weiss Essen's reserve side in the summer of 2011. During the winter break of the 2011–12 season, Yıldırım was then appointed as manager of Regionalliga Nord side VfB Lübeck. He was released by Lübeck in December 2012. On 28 June 2013 he was appointed manager of Sportfreunde Lotte. He left the club on 3 January 2014.

== Managerial record ==
As of 4 January 2014

Team	From	To	Record							
Team	From	To	G	W	D	L	GF	GA	GD	Win %
Rot-Weiss Essen II	8 July 2011	13 December 2011	16	9	1	6	48	21	+27	56.25
VfB Lübeck	13 December 2011	19 December 2012	39	12	7	20	39	50	−11	30.77
Sportfreunde Lotte	28 June 2013	3 January 2014	19	11	6	2	35	12	+23	57.89
Totals			74	32	14	28	122	83	+39	43.24
