= Jens Todt =

German former professional footballer (born 1970)

Personal information
- Date of birth: 5 January 1970 (age 56)
- Place of birth: Hamelin, West Germany
- Height: 1.87 m (6 ft 2 in)
- Position: Defensive midfielder

Youth career
- 1978–1989: ASC Nienburg

Senior career*
| Years | Team | Apps | (Gls) |
| 1989–1991 | TSV Havelse | 59 | (9) |
| 1991–1996 | SC Freiburg | 168 | (29) |
| 1996–1999 | Werder Bremen | 72 | (6) |
| 1999–2003 | VfB Stuttgart | 41 | (1) |
| Total | | 340 | (45) |

International career
| 1994–1996 | Germany | 3 | (0) |
Medal record
Men's football
Representing Germany
UEFA European Championship
| Winner | 1996 England |
- * Club domestic league appearances and goals

Jens Todt (born 5 January 1970) is a German former professional footballer who played as a defensive midfielder.

== Club career ==
Todt began playing professionally with TSV Havelse. In 1991, he followed manager Volker Finke to SC Freiburg, in the 2. Bundesliga, and the two would eventually gain legendary status at the Black Forest outfit. In his second season, he scored a career-best 11 goals in 42 games, being instrumental as the club promoted to the Bundesliga for the first time ever.

Freiburg managed to maintain its top flight status in the following three seasons - finishing third in 1995 - with Todt scoring 14 league goals combined. In the 1996 summer, he signed for SV Werder Bremen, as a replacement for ageing Dieter Eilts (31) and Mirko Votava (40), managing to appear regularly for the club during his three-year spell, which ended with DFB-Pokal conquest, with the player missing in the penalty shootout against FC Bayern Munich (1–1 after 120 minutes) in the final.

Todt subsequently joined VfB Stuttgart, rarely managing to appear due to injuries and loss of form. He retired in 2003 at the age of 33, with German top division totals of 209 games and 21 goals (plus 101/18 in the second level).

After retiring, Todt worked as a journalist for Der Spiegel, joining Hamburger SV as youth team coordinator shortly after. He left HSV in June 2009, and took up a similar role with VfL Wolfsburg seven months later.

== International career ==
Todt earned three caps for the Germany national team, his debut coming on 12 October 1994, in a 0–0 friendly draw with Hungary.

He was called up to the squad just before the final of UEFA Euro 1996 as a last-minute addition, due to injuries, but did not play for the eventual champions.

== Management career ==
He was the Sporting Director of VfL Bochum, before being sacked on 8 April 2013.

On 1 January 2017, he was named as the sporting director of Hamburger SV. On 8 March 2018, he was relieved of his duties after Frank Wettstein took over as HSV chairman.

== Honours ==
SC Freiburg

- 2. Bundesliga: 1992–93

Werder Bremen

- UEFA Intertoto Cup: 1998
- DFB-Pokal: 1998–99

VfB Stuttgart

- UEFA Intertoto Cup: 2002

Germany

- UEFA European Championship: 1996
