= Andreas Schäfer =

German footballer

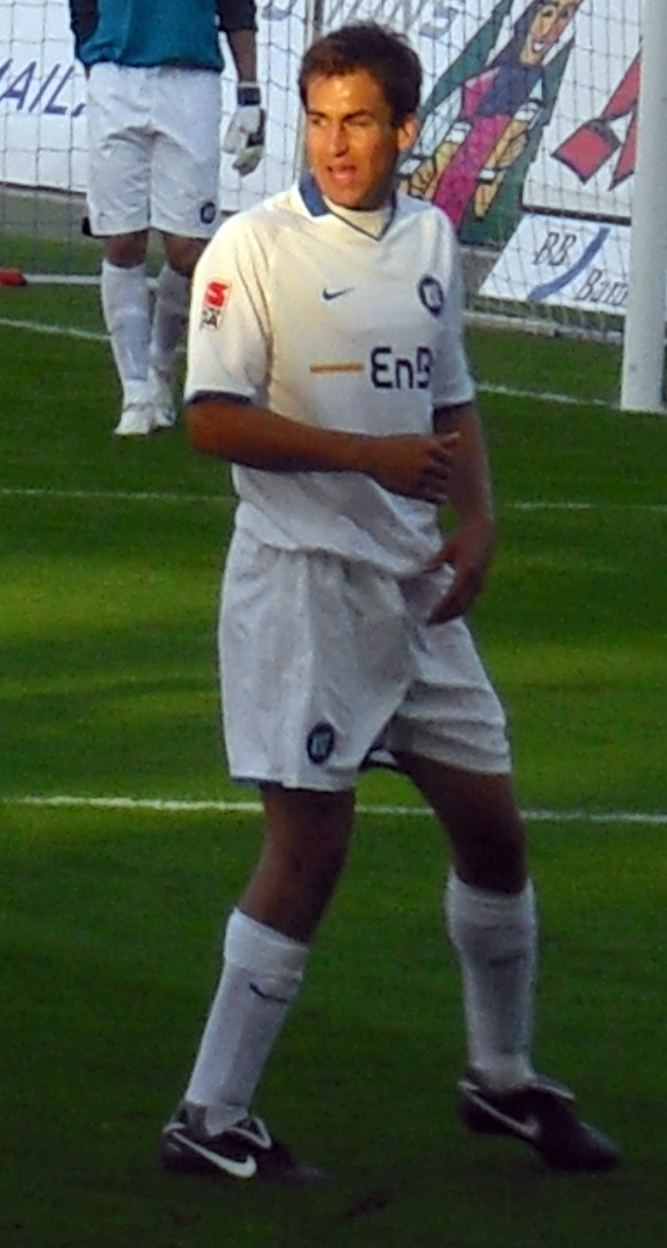

Personal information
- Full name: Andreas Schäfer
- Date of birth: 5 February 1983 (age 43)
- Place of birth: Daun, West Germany
- Height: 1.78 m (5 ft 10 in)
- Position: Defender

Youth career
- 1997–1999: SV Strohn
- 1999–2001: JSG Steiningen

Senior career*
Years	Team	Apps	(Gls)
2001–2004	1. FC Kaiserslautern II	37	(1)
2004–2009	VfL Osnabrück	150	(6)
2009–2011	Karlsruher SC	58	(1)
2011–2013	FC Ingolstadt	52	(0)
2013–2015	Viktoria Köln	55	(0)
- * Club domestic league appearances and goals as of 8 December 2015 (UTC)

Andreas Schäfer (born 5 February 1983 in Daun) is a German footballer.

== Career ==
He made his debut on the professional league level in the 2. Bundesliga for VfL Osnabrück on 10 August 2007 when he started in a game against SC Freiburg.
