= Oualid Mokhtari =

Moroccan-German footballer

Personal information
- Date of birth: 29 April 1982 (age 44)
- Place of birth: Nador, Morocco
- Height: 1.82 m (6 ft 0 in)
- Position: Midfielder

Youth career
- SSV Raunheim
- SV Raunheim
- –1999: Kickers Offenbach
- 1999–2000: Eintracht Frankfurt

Senior career*
Years	Team	Apps	(Gls)
2000–2001	Jahn Regensburg	14	(0)
2002	VfR Mannheim	8	(3)
2003–2004	Wehen Wiesbaden	51	(3)
2005–2008	Kickers Offenbach	75	(6)
2008–2010	FSV Frankfurt	31	(1)
2012	VfB Lübeck	11	(0)
Total		190	(13)
- * Club domestic league appearances and goals

Oualid Mokhtari (born 29 April 1982) is a Moroccan former professional footballer who played as a midfielder. He also holds German citizenship. He is the brother of Youssef Mokhtari.
