= Daniel Flottmann =

German footballer (born 1984)

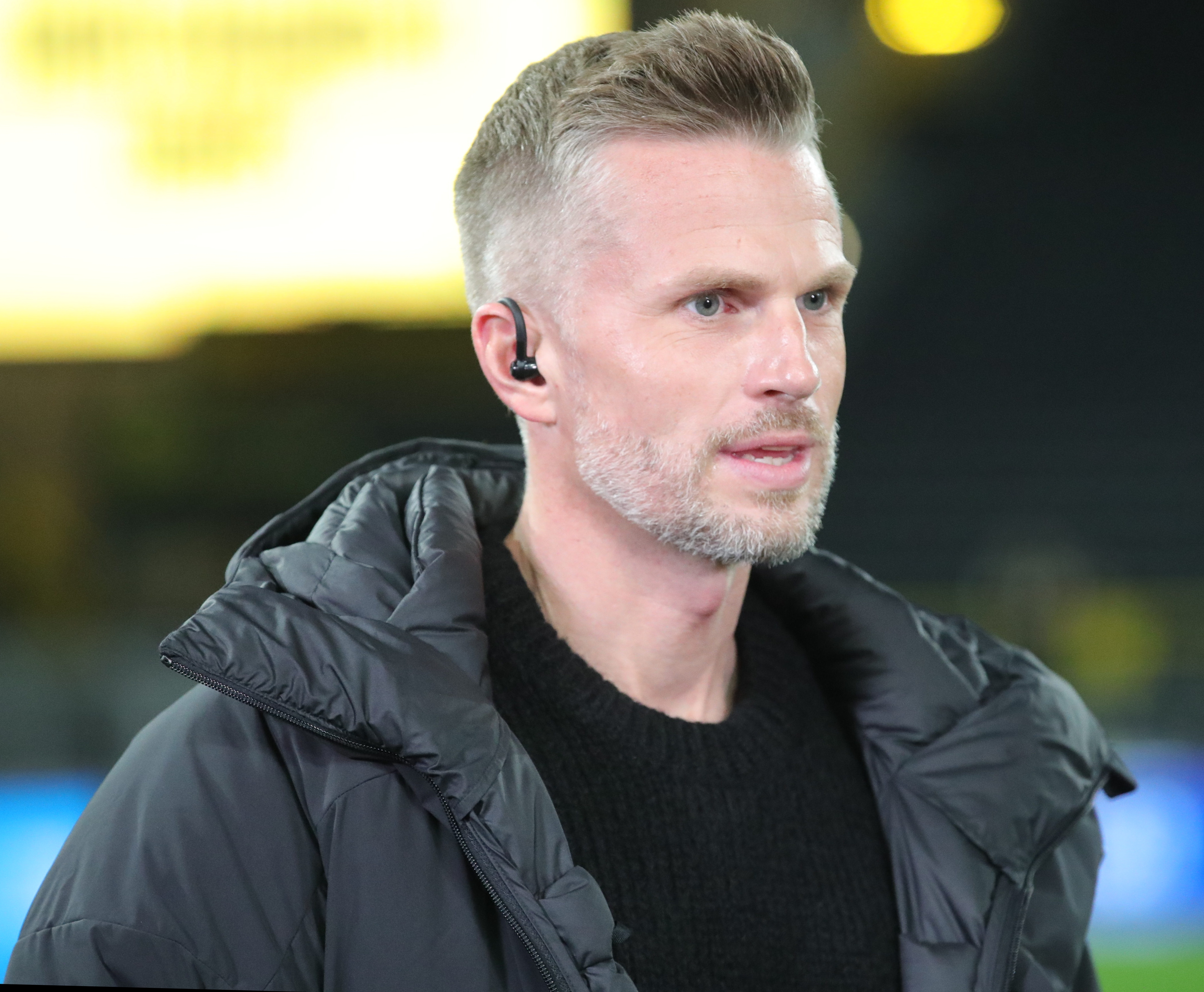
- Flottmann in 2022

Personal information
- Date of birth: 6 August 1984 (age 42)
- Place of birth: Osnabrück, West Germany
- Height: 1.93 m (6 ft 4 in)
- Position: Centre-back

Youth career
- Eintracht Rulle
- –1998: TSV Wallenhorst
- 1998–2004: VfL Osnabrück

Senior career*
Years	Team	Apps	(Gls)
2004–2008	VfL Osnabrück	36	(0)
2008–2010	SC Verl	57	(5)
2010–2011	Rot-Weiss Ahlen	36	(0)
2011–2012	Wuppertaler SV Borussia	33	(4)
2012–2017	Fortuna Köln	139	(5)
2017–	SV Rödinghausen	223	(12)
Total		524	(26)
- * Club domestic league appearances and goals

Daniel Flottmann (born 6 August 1984) is a German former professional footballer who played as a centre-back.
