= Suat Türker =

Turkish-German footballer (1976–2023)

Personal information
- Date of birth: 10 March 1976
- Place of birth: Bayburt, Turkey
- Date of death: 12 February 2023 (aged 46)
- Height: 1.79 m (5 ft 10 in)
- Position: Striker

Youth career
- VfB Stuttgart
- –1993: SSV Reutlingen

Senior career*
Years	Team	Apps	(Gls)
1993–1995	VfB Stuttgart (A)	36	(9)
1995–1999	Istanbulspor	42	(5)
1999–2001	TSF Ditzingen	48	(23)
2001–2002	Bayern Munich (A)	14	(1)
2002	1899 Hoffenheim	9	(4)
2002	Young Boys	0	(0)
2002–2003	Borussia Neunkirchen	36	(9)
2003–2008	Kickers Offenbach	147	(64)
2008–2009	SC Freiburg	12	(1)
2009–2010	Kickers Offenbach	27	(2)
2010–2011	SV Wehen Wiesbaden	13	(3)
2011–2012	Kickers Offenbach II	14	(2)
Total		398	(123)
- * Club domestic league appearances and goals

Suat Türker (10 March 1976 – 12 February 2023) was a Turkish-German professional footballer who played as a striker.

== Career ==
Born in Bayburt, Turkey, Türker began his professional career with Istanbulspor, appearing in 38 Süper Lig matches over two seasons.

Türker played for Kickers Offenbach from 2003 to 2008 and became a fan favourite there. He played for SC Freiburg during the first half of the 2008–09 season. In January 2009 he returned to Kickers Offenbach.

== Death ==
On 12 February 2023, Türker's former club Kickers Offenbach announced that he had died "unexpectedly" that day, at the age of 46.
