= Dennis Grote =

German footballer (born 1986)

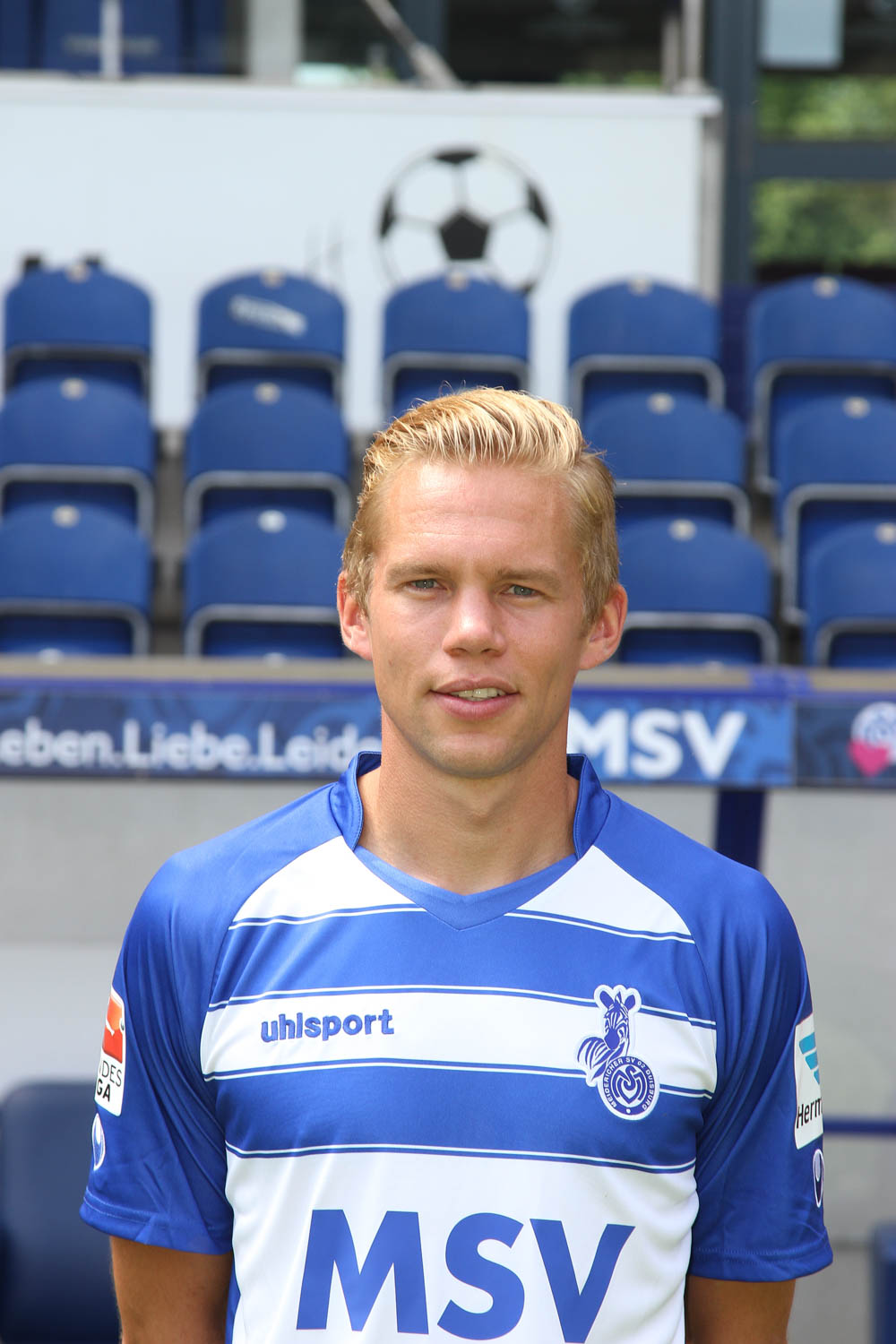
- Grote in 2015

Personal information
- Date of birth: 9 August 1986 (age 40)
- Place of birth: Kaiserslautern, West Germany
- Height: 1.80 m (5 ft 11 in)
- Position: Midfielder

Team information
- Current team: VfL Bochum II
- Number: 12

Youth career
- 1. FC Kaiserslautern
- FC Vorwärts Wettringen
- –2002: Preußen Münster
- 2002–2004: VfL Bochum

Senior career*
Years	Team	Apps	(Gls)
2003–2010	VfL Bochum II	41	(3)
2004–2011	VfL Bochum	85	(7)
2011	→ Rot-Weiß Oberhausen (loan)	13	(0)
2012–2014	Preußen Münster	82	(12)
2014–2016	MSV Duisburg	55	(6)
2016–2019	Chemnitzer FC	98	(11)
2019–2022	Rot-Weiss Essen	71	(11)
2022	Wacker Innsbruck	13	(1)
2022–2024	Preußen Münster	35	(2)
2024–	VfL Bochum II	0	(0)

International career
2004–2005	Germany U-19	5	(0)
2005–2006	Germany U-20	5	(0)
2007–2009	Germany U-21	14	(0)
Medal record
Men's football
Representing Germany
UEFA European Under-21 Championship
Winner	2009 Sweden
- * Club domestic league appearances and goals as of 22 May 2024

Dennis Grote (born 9 August 1986) is a German professional footballer who played as a midfielder for VfL Bochum II. In 2009, he won the 2009 UEFA Under-21 Championship with the Germany under-21 national team.

== Club career ==
After starting his career at Bundesliga side 1. FC Kaiserslautern, he joined VfL Bochum in 2002 and came from the youth team to the first team in the Bundesliga. In the second half of the 2004–05 season, Grote played as an amateur in five league games. In summer 2005, he signed a professional contract.

On 16 December 2005, he scored his first professional goal in the 88th minute for a 1–0 victory in a second division match against Unterhaching. Easter Monday 2006, he earned promotion with VfL Bochum to the Bundesliga after winning the 2. Bundesliga.

He scored his first Bundesliga goal on 5 May 2007 in a 3–0 away victory against Hamburger SV. In 2007, he signed a new deal with Bochum until the end of the 2011 season. He also scored his first goal of the season against Hamburger SV in a 1–0 victory for Bochum in November 2009. In his final season at Bochum in 2010–11, he only played eight times for them in the Bundesliga. During winter break 2010–11, he moved to Rot-Weiß Oberhausen on loan. However, Grote was unable to save them from relegation after playing 13 times. Oberhausen finished the season in 17th place and were relegated from the 2. Bundesliga.

In August 2011, Grote joined Leeds United on trial. In August 2011, he played for Leeds against Farsley Celtic. He helped getting two assists in the match for fellow German trialist Felix Luz.

He joined MSV Duisburg for the 2014–15 season.

He moved to Chemnitzer FC for the 2016–17 season. After three seasons at the club, he moved to Rot-Weiss Essen ahead of the 2019–20 season. The deal was announced already on 8 April 2019 and he penned a two-year contract.

On 7 February 2022, Grote was released from his contract with Rot-Weiss Essen and signed a contract until the end of the 2021–22 season with Wacker Innsbruck in Austria.

On 13 July 2022, Grote, who was free again after the bankruptcy of Wacker Innsbruck, signed a contract with Preußen Münster.

On 1 June 2024, Grote returned to VfL Bochum in a dual role, as a scout and as a player for VfL Bochum II.

== International career ==
Grote played for various Germany national teams. He was on the Germany U21 squad that won the 2009 UEFA Under-21 Championship. Also on the side were: Mesut Özil, Manuel Neuer and Sami Khedira. He was an unused substitute against England Under 21s in the final.

== Career statistics ==
As of 2 January 2022

Appearances and goals by club, season and competition
Club	Season	League			DFB-Pokal		Total	
Club	Season	Division	Apps	Goals	Apps	Goals	Apps	Goals
VfL Bochum II	2003–04	Oberliga Westfalen	2	0	–		2	0
VfL Bochum II	2004–05	Oberliga Westfalen	4	0	–		4	0
VfL Bochum II	2005–06	Oberliga Westfalen	12	2	1	1	13	3
VfL Bochum II	2006–07	Oberliga Westfalen	6	0	–		6	0
VfL Bochum II	2007–08	Oberliga Westfalen	6	0	–		6	0
VfL Bochum II	2008–09	Regionalliga West	4	1	–		4	1
VfL Bochum II	2009–10	Regionalliga West	7	0	–		7	0
VfL Bochum II	Total		41	3	1	1	42	4
VfL Bochum	2004–05	Bundesliga	5	0	0	0	5	0
VfL Bochum	2005–06	2. Bundesliga	9	1	0	0	9	1
VfL Bochum	2004–05	Bundesliga	16	1	1	0	17	1
VfL Bochum	2007–08	Bundesliga	18	1	2	1	20	2
VfL Bochum	2008–09	Bundesliga	20	3	1	0	21	3
VfL Bochum	2009–10	Bundesliga	10	1	1	0	11	1
VfL Bochum	2010–11	2. Bundesliga	7	0	1	0	8	0
VfL Bochum	Total		85	7	6	1	91	8
Rot-Weiß Oberhausen	2010–11	2. Bundesliga	13	0	0	0	13	0
Preußen Münster	2011–12	3. Liga	12	1	–		12	1
Preußen Münster	2012–13	3. Liga	36	2	2	0	38	2
Preußen Münster	2013–14	3. Liga	34	9	2	0	41	9
Preußen Münster	Total		82	12	4	0	86	12
MSV Duisburg	2014–15	3. Liga	35	6	2	0	37	6
MSV Duisburg	2015–16	2. Bundesliga	20	0	1	0	21	0
MSV Duisburg	Total		55	6	3	0	58	6
Chemnitzer FC	2016–17	3. Liga	34	2	0	0	34	2
Chemnitzer FC	2017–18	3. Liga	33	2	1	0	34	2
Chemnitzer FC	2018–19	Regionalliga Nordost	31	7	0	0	31	7
Chemnitzer FC	Total		98	11	1	0	99	11
Rot-Weiss Essen	2019–20	Regionalliga West	14	0	0	0	14	0
Rot-Weiss Essen	2020–21	Regionalliga West	39	10	4	0	43	10
Rot-Weiss Essen	2021–22	Regionalliga West	18	1	0	0	18	1
Rot-Weiss Essen	Total		63	11	4	0	67	11
Career total			437	50	19	2	456	52

== Honours ==
Germany U21

- UEFA Under-21 Championship: 2009
