= Leimbachstadion =

Football stadium in Siegen, Germany

Coordinates: 50°51′08″N 8°01′34″E

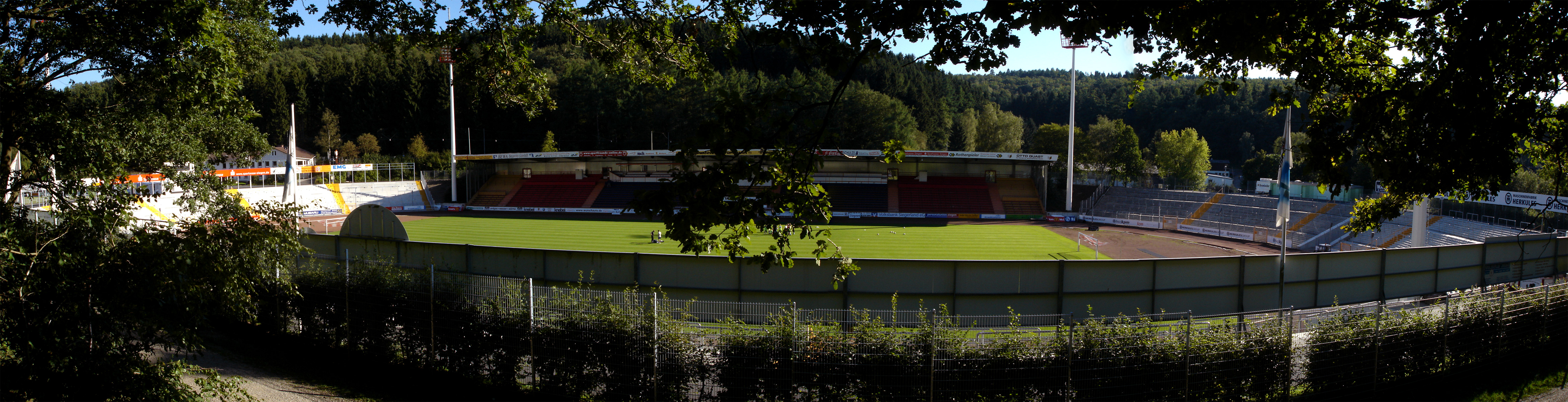
- Location: Siegen, Germany
- Owner: Stadt Siegen
- Operator: Sportfreunde Siegen
- Capacity: 18,500
- Surface: Grass

Construction
- Opened: 22 September 1957
- Renovated: 1975, 2005

Tenants
- Sportfreunde Siegen

Leimbachstadion is a multi-use stadium in Siegen, Germany. It is currently used mostly for football matches and is the home stadium of Sportfreunde Siegen. The stadium is able to hold about 18,500 people.
