= Lars Toborg =

German footballer

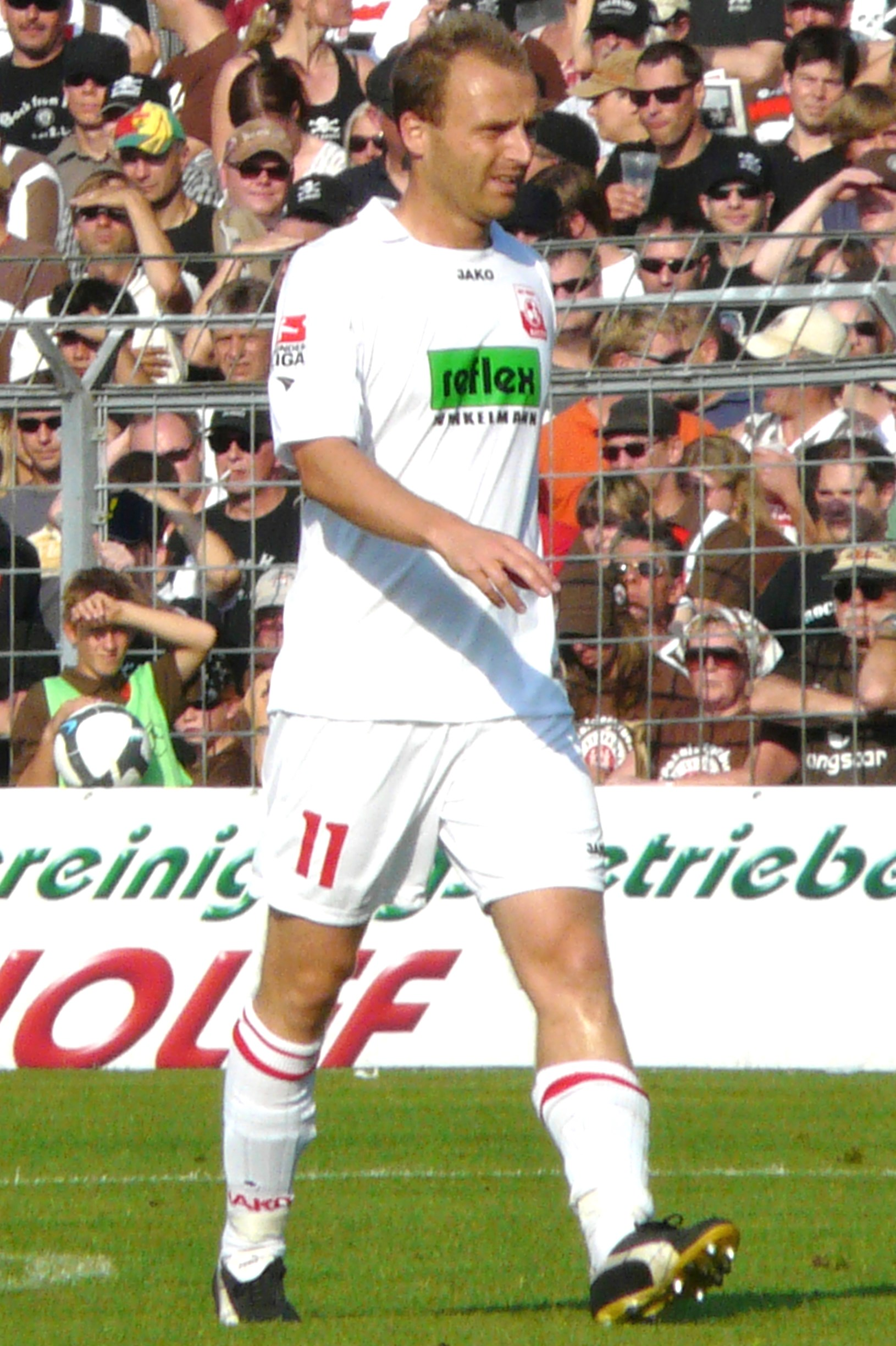
- Toborg with Rot Weiss Ahlen in 2009

Personal information
- Date of birth: 19 August 1975 (age 51)
- Place of birth: Bremerhaven, West Germany
- Height: 1.80 m (5 ft 11 in)
- Position: Striker

Senior career*
Years	Team	Apps	(Gls)
1995–1998	FC Bremerhaven		
1998–2002	Rot-Weiß Oberhausen	91	(10)
2002–2003	SV Wilhelmshaven		
2003–2005	Sportfreunde Siegen	45	(8)
2005–2006	SG Wattenscheid 09	36	(14)
2006–2010	Rot Weiss Ahlen	111	(48)
- * Club domestic league appearances and goals

Lars Toborg (born 19 August 1975) is a German former professional footballer who played as a forward.
