= Ersin Demir =

Turkish footballer

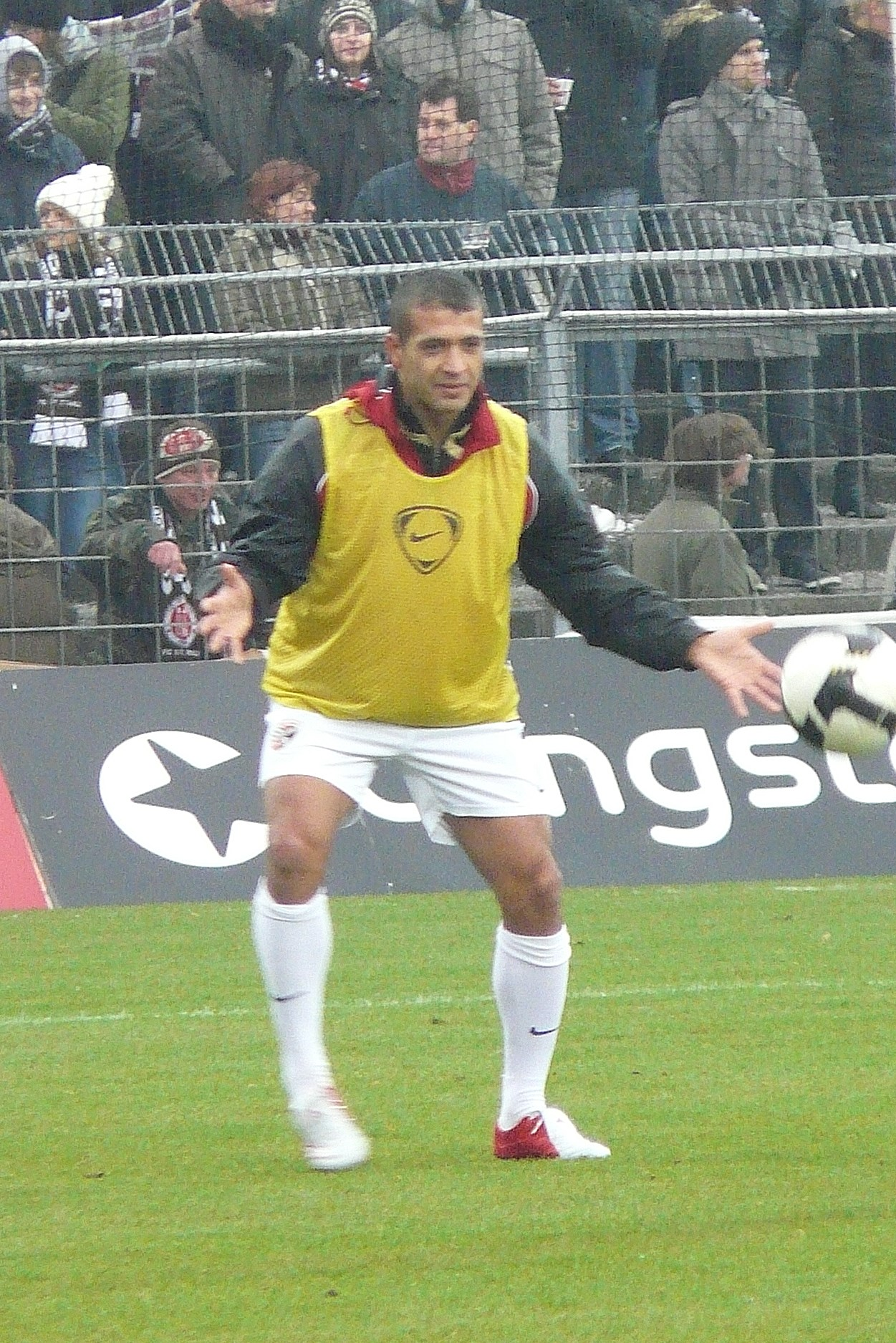
- Demir in 2008

Personal information
- Date of birth: 8 December 1977 (age 48)
- Place of birth: Cologne, West Germany
- Height: 1.75 m (5 ft 9 in)
- Position: Striker

Youth career
- Adler Dellbrück
- TuS Höhenhaus

Senior career*
Years	Team	Apps	(Gls)
1995–2000	Bayer Leverkusen II	28	(22)
2000–2001	Alemannia Aachen	8	(0)
2001–2002	Samsunspor	1	(0)
2002–2003	Chemnitzer FC	36	(19)
2003	FC Augsburg	16	(3)
2004–2007	Erzgebirge Aue	63	(10)
2007–2010	FC Ingolstadt	74	(20)
2010	FC Ingolstadt II	1	(3)

Managerial career
- 2014–2015: FC Ingolstadt U19
- 2015–2017: FC Ingolstadt II (assistant)
- 2017: FC Ingolstadt (assistant)
- 2017–2018: FC Ingolstadt II
- * Club domestic league appearances and goals

Ersin Demir (born 8 December 1977 in Cologne) is a Turkish football coach and former player, who most recently was the manager of FC Ingolstadt 04 II.

He last played for FC Ingolstadt 04 II.

== Personal life ==
He also holds German citizenship.
