= Jörg Emmerich =

German footballer (born 1974)

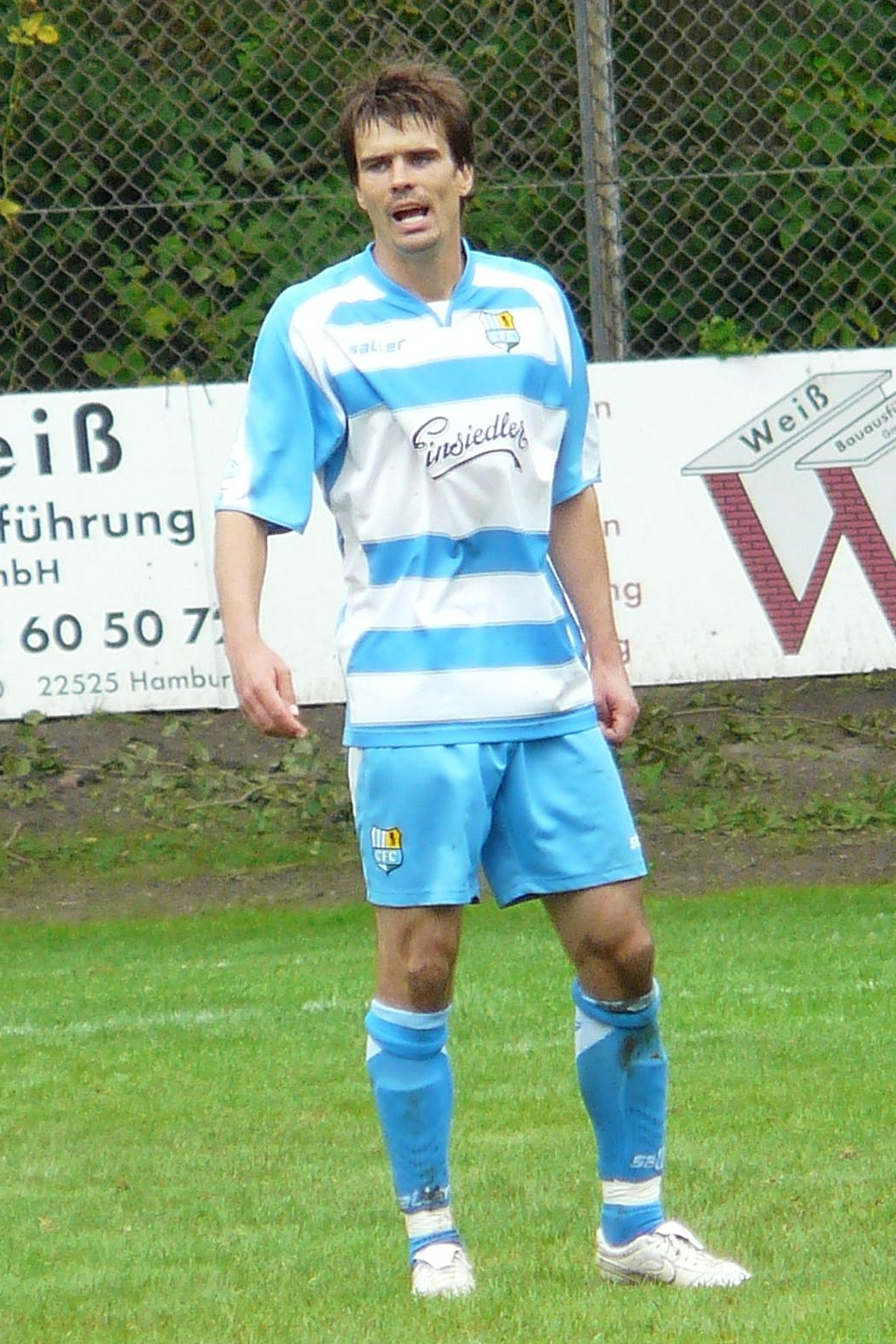
- Emmerich in 2008

Personal information
- Date of birth: 9 March 1974 (age 52)
- Place of birth: Halle, East Germany
- Height: 1.82 m (6 ft 0 in)
- Positions: Defender; midfielder

Youth career
- –1991: Hallescher FC

Senior career*
Years	Team	Apps	(Gls)
1991–1992	Hallescher FC		
1992–1996	SV Merseburg		
1996–2000	VfL Halle 96		
2000–2002	Rot-Weiß Erfurt	48	(1)
2002–2008	Erzgebirge Aue	174	(11)
2008–2011	Chemnitzer FC	62	(4)

Managerial career
- 2024–2025: Erzgebirge Aue (interim)
- * Club domestic league appearances and goals

Jörg Emmerich (born 9 March 1974) is a German former professional footballer.
