= Felix Luz =

German footballer

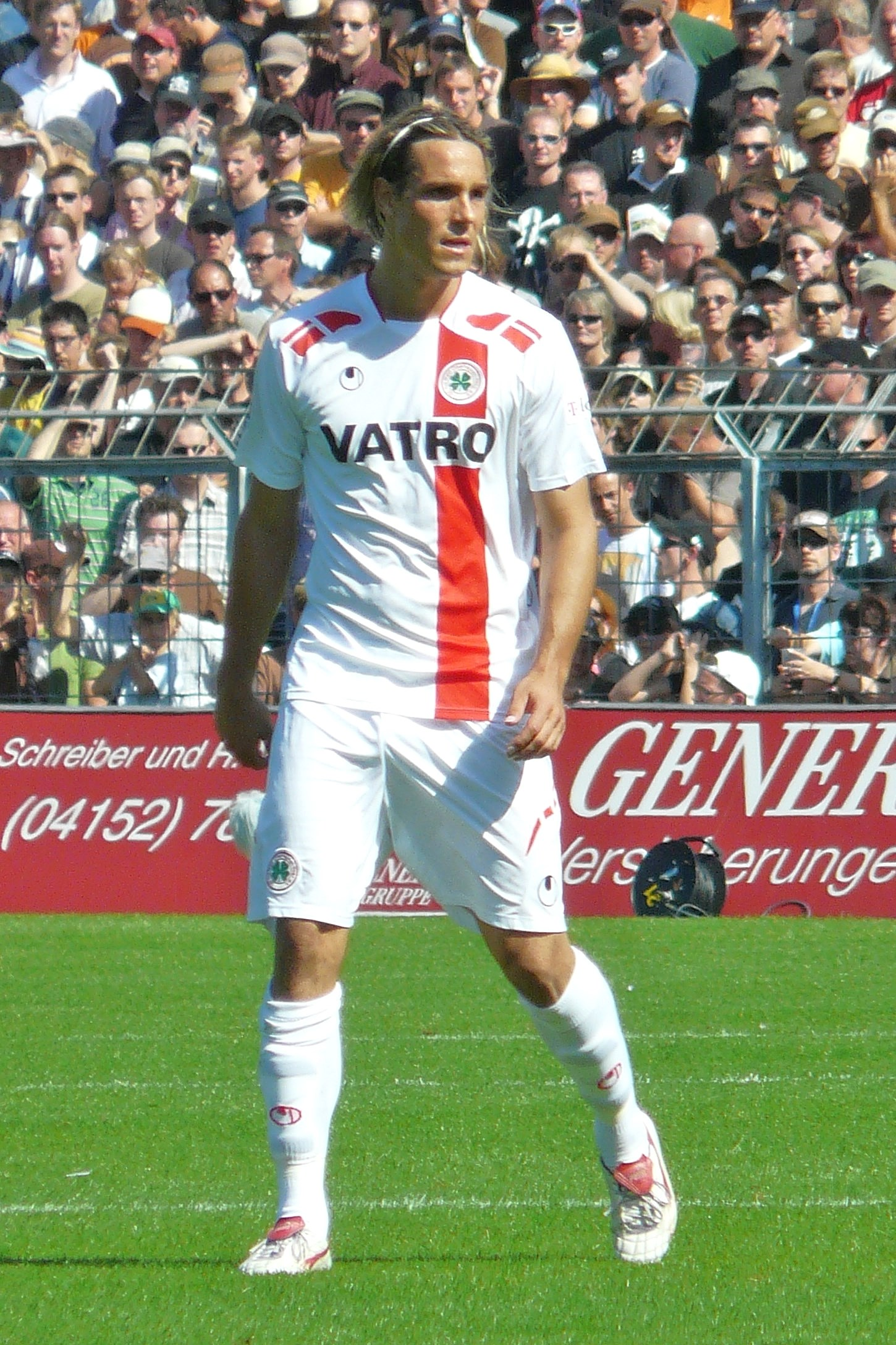
- Luz in 2008

Personal information
- Date of birth: 18 January 1982 (age 44)
- Place of birth: Esslingen (Neckar), West Germany
- Height: 1.86 m (6 ft 1 in)
- Position: Striker

Youth career
- SG Eintracht Sirnau
- TSV Deizisau
- –1997: TSV Wäldenbronn-Esslingen
- 1997–2001: VfB Stuttgart

Senior career*
Years	Team	Apps	(Gls)
2001–2005	VfB Stuttgart II	49	(9)
2004	→ TSG Hoffenheim II (loan)	6	(2)
2004	→ TSG Hoffenheim (loan)	4	(0)
2005–2006	FC St. Pauli	49	(13)
2007–2008	FC Augsburg	28	(3)
2008–2011	Rot-Weiß Oberhausen	16	(3)
2011	SHB Đà Nẵng		
2012	KVC Westerlo	6	(1)
2012–2013	Wacker Burghausen	30	(5)
2013–2014	SV Elversberg	29	(11)
2014–2016	1. FC Saarbrücken	38	(11)
- * Club domestic league appearances and goals

Felix Luz (born 18 January 1982) is a German former professional footballer who played as a striker. His career was hampered by suffering various knee injuries in his career.

== Career ==
Luz was born in Esslingen am Neckar. He started his career at Bundesliga club VfB Stuttgart, but played for the VfB Stuttgart II side. Then in 2004 he joined TSG 1899 Hoffenheim on loan in the South Regional. After his loan spell at Hoffenheim he returned to VfB Stuttgart II.

In July 2005 he signed for FC St. Pauli in the Regionalliga where he scored 13 goals for the club. He was part of the side that reached the German Cup semi finals. After his good form for St. Pauli in an impressive run they called their legendary 'B series', in which all Cup opponents played started with the letter B (Burghausen, Bochum, Berlin, Bremen, Bayern), in December 2005, Luz, scored the goal of the month in the second round of the DFB-Pokal against Hertha BSC in a 2–2 draw. The goal was voted as the second best goal of the season. They reached the semi-finals of the cup but were eventually knocked out of the competition by Bayern Munich. In total, Luz scored three goals in the cup run against Bundesliga sides. For the 2006–07 season, he wanted to sign for relegated Bundesliga club 1. FC Köln, however, the move fell through.

He helped St. Pauli in the first half of their 2006–07 promotion season. In the January winter break, Luz moved to 2. Bundesliga side FC Augsburg. The move drew criticism from the St. Pauli fans who were disappointed to see their talisman leave the club. The move saw him contribute to a voluntary salary cut, which was seen as a contribution to the transfer fee. He made his debut on the professional league level in the 2. Bundesliga for FC Augsburg on 21 January 2007 when he started in a game against 1. FC Köln. In the second half of the 2007–08 season, he was regularly used but playing mainly the role of the substitute and mainly only in the closing stages. During his time at Augsburg he picked up a serious knee injury which required surgery and kept him out for a sustained period. In total, he played 28 matches and scored three goals for the club.

After that season he moved to league rivals Rot-Weiß Oberhausen in 2008. However his time at the club was hampered by knee injuries which limited his appearances. He played nine times during the 2010–11 season scoring three goals. Oberhausen finished the season in 17th place and were relegated from 2. Bundesliga. On 30 June 2011, his contract ran out in Oberhausen, he started training with VfB Stuttgart II to keep himself fit.

In August 2011, he joined Leeds United on trial along with former teammate Dennis Grote. In August 2011, he played for Leeds against Farsley F.C. in which he scored a hat-trick and was named by the club on the official website. Luz trial spell was extended on 11 August and he was set to play for Leeds in a behind closed doors friendly. But he left on 19 August 2011, after failing to win a deal with the Elland Road club.

Luz signed with Vietnamese side SHB Đà Nẵng on 22 October 2011 after a successful trial stint. Luz was then released by SHB Đà Nẵng after just a couple of months playing at the club.
