= Stefan Brasas =

German footballer

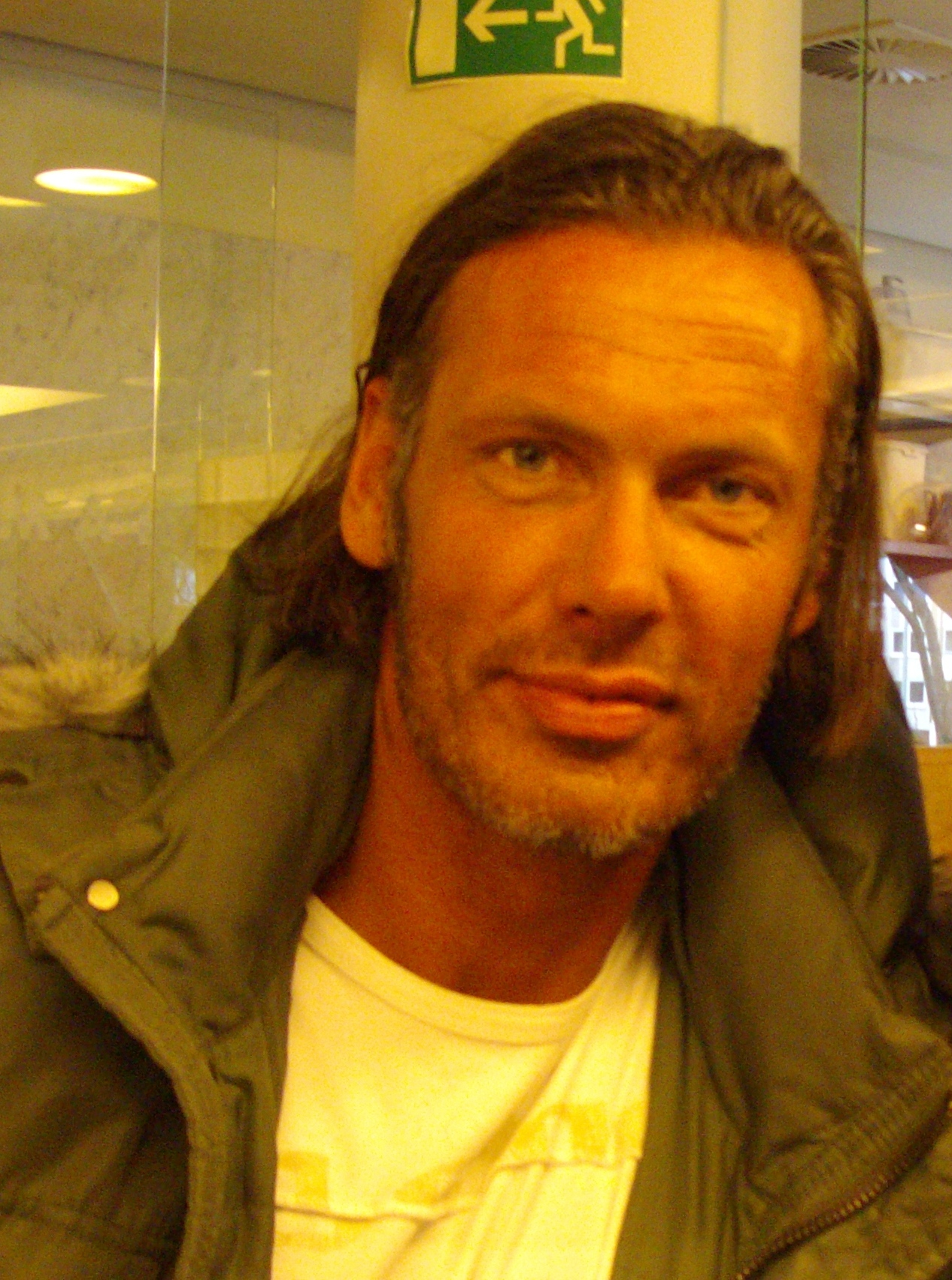
- Brasas in 2008

Personal information
- Date of birth: 31 August 1967 (age 59)
- Place of birth: Münster, West Germany
- Height: 2.02 m (6 ft 8 in)
- Position: Goalkeeper

Youth career
- SV Teutonia Münster
- Preußen Münster
- –1985: VfL Bochum

Senior career*
Years	Team	Apps	(Gls)
1985–1987	VfL Bochum II		
1987–1988	Werder Bremen II		
1988–1989	FC Mahndorf		
1989–1991	Stuttgarter Kickers	47	(0)
1992–1993	1. FC Saarbrücken	27	(0)
1993–1994	Stuttgarter Kickers	7	(0)
1994–1998	SV Meppen	124	(1)
1998–2001	Werder Bremen	6	(0)
2001–2002	MSV Duisburg	30	(0)
2002–2003	AC Omonia	20	(0)
2003–2005	SpVgg Unterhaching	11	(0)

Managerial career
- 2008: Wuppertaler SV (goalkeeper coach)
- 2008–2009: Al Ain (goalkeeper coach)
- 2011–2013: Thailand (goalkeeper coach)
- * Club domestic league appearances and goals

Stefan Brasas (born 31 August 1967 in Münster) is a German football coach and former player who played as a goalkeeper.
