= Bernhard Trares =

German football manager (born 1965)

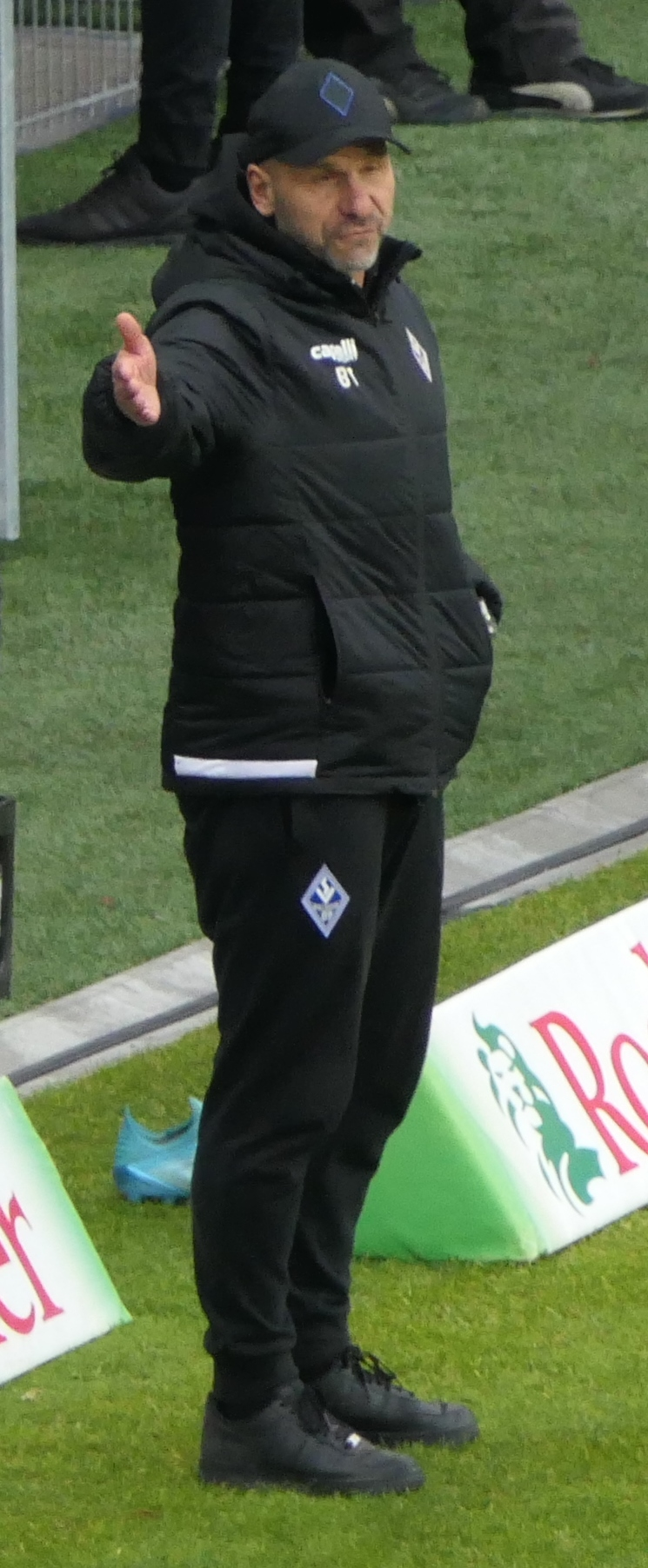
- Trares in 2019

Personal information
- Date of birth: 18 August 1965 (age 61)
- Place of birth: Bensheim, West Germany
- Height: 1.77 m (5 ft 10 in)
- Positions: Defender; defensive midfielder

Youth career
- SV Kirschhausen
- 1982–1985: Eintracht Frankfurt

Senior career*
Years	Team	Apps	(Gls)
1985–1989	Darmstadt 98	126	(28)
1989–1991	Alemannia Aachen	30	(9)
1991–1997	1860 Munich	133	(14)
1997–2001	Werder Bremen	89	(6)
2001–2002	Waldhof Mannheim	31	(2)
2002–2004	Karlsruher SC	55	(3)
Total		464	(62)

Managerial career
- 2007–2009: Wormatia Worms
- 2010–2011: FSV Frankfurt II
- 2011–2014: Schalke 04 II
- 2018–2020: Waldhof Mannheim
- 2020–2021: Würzburger Kickers
- 2024–2025: Waldhof Mannheim
- * Club domestic league appearances and goals

Bernhard Trares (born 18 August 1965) is a German former professional footballer who played mainly as a centre-back, and manager.

== Playing career ==
Trares was born in Bensheim, Hesse. Having played in his youth for SV Kirschhausen he joined Eintracht Frankfurt in 1982 and completed his formation there, and his professional career started in the second division at SV Darmstadt 98, as a defensive midfielder. He competed solely in the category during his spell with the "Lilien", scoring a career-best 11 goals in his last season.

In the 1989 summer Trares joined Alemannia Aachen also in second level, being relegated in his first year and switching to fellow league side TSV 1860 Munich in 1991, in another eventual relegation. In just two further seasons, however, the Bavarians succeeded to promote to the Bundesliga, subsequently finishing 14th to retain their league status with the player netting four times in 31 matches, while also being sent off twice.

After two additional years Trares left Munich to join SV Werder Bremen, where he became an important player in the team's defence, also helping it to the 1999 conquest of the German Cup, a penalty shootout win against Bayern Munich (1–1 after extra time). At age 36 he moved to the 2. Bundesliga's SV Waldhof Mannheim, after which he signed with Karlsruher SC for another two years in the category, retiring at the end of the 2003–04 campaign.

Altogether, Trares made 183 top flight appearances and scored 16 goals, adding 281 games with 46 in the second division.

== Coaching career ==
In December 2004 Trares began his coaching career, serving as assistant manager with former side 1860 Munich and remaining in the post until April 2006. In January 2007 he took the reins of Wormatia Worms in Oberliga Südwest, leading the team to the Südwest-Pokal (the Cup of the Südwestdeutscher Fußballverband, i.e. South-West German football association) in his first year and qualifying it for the first round of the domestic cup.

On 29 April 2009, Trares was fired by the Worms. In November of the following year, he was appointed at FSV Frankfurt's reserves.

In January 2018 Trares became new manager of SV Waldhof Mannheim succeeding Michael Fink. He left the club on 4 July 2020.

Trares was announced as new head coach of Würzburger Kickers on 9 November 2020. He was sacked on 2 April 2021.

He returned as head coach of SV Waldhof Mannheim in September 2024. In April 2025, he was sacked.
