= 2004 UEFA Intertoto Cup =

Tournament details
- Dates: 19 June 2004 – 24 August 2004
- Teams: 61

Final positions
- Champions: (France) Lille (Germany) Schalke 04 (Spain) Villarreal

Tournament statistics
- Matches played: 116
- Goals scored: 293 (2.53 per match)

The 2004 UEFA Intertoto Cup football finals (the summer football competition for European clubs that had not qualified for one of the two major UEFA competitions) were won by Lille, Schalke 04, and Villarreal.

All three teams advanced to the UEFA Cup.

== First round ==
Team 1	Agg.	Team 2	1st leg	2nd leg
Publikum Celje (Slovenia)	2–2 (a)	(Bosnia and Herzegovina) Sloboda Tuzla	2–1	0–1
Vllaznia (Albania)	4–2	(Israel) Hapoel Be'er Sheva	1–2	3–0
Ethnikos Achna (Cyprus)	2–10	(North Macedonia) Vardar	1–5	1–5
Hibernians (Malta)	2–4	(Croatia) Slaven Belupo	2–1	0–3
Sant Julià (Andorra)	0–11	(Serbia and Montenegro) Sartid	0–8	0–3
Marek Dupnitsa (Bulgaria)	2–0	(Georgia (country)) Dila Gori	0–0	2–0
Spartak Moscow (Russia)	2–1	(Lithuania) Atlantas	2–0	0–1
Sopron (Hungary)	2–3	(Czech Republic) Teplice	1–0	1–3
Thun (Switzerland)	2–0	(Romania) Gloria Bistriţa	2–0	0–0
MyPa (Finland)	3–4	(Czech Republic) Tescoma Zlín	1–1	2–3
Schwarz-Weiß Bregenz (Austria)	1–5	(Azerbaijan) Khazar Universiteti	0–3	1–2
Spartak Trnava (Slovakia)	4–4 (a)	(Hungary) Debrecen	3–0	1–4
Odra Wodzisław (Poland)	1–2	(Belarus) Dinamo Minsk	1–0	0–2
Teuta (Albania)	0–4	(Slovakia) ZTS Dubnica	0–0	0–4
Gent (Belgium)	3–1	(Iceland) Fylkir	2–1	1–0
Cork City (Republic of Ireland)	4–1	(Sweden) Malmö FF	3–1	1–0
Vėtra (Lithuania)	4–0	(Estonia) Narva Trans	3–0	1–0
Odense (Denmark)	7–0	(Northern Ireland) Ballymena United	0–0	7–0
Grevenmacher (Luxembourg)	1–1 (a)	(Finland) Tampere United	1–1	0–0
Aberystwyth Town (Wales)	0–4	(Latvia) Dinaburg	0–0	0–4
Esbjerg (Denmark)	7–1	(Faroe Islands) NSÍ Runavík	3–1	4–0

=== First leg ===
19 June 2004

Publikum Celje (Slovenia)	2–1	(Bosnia and Herzegovina) Sloboda Tuzla
Baldovaliev 39'; Vršič 55'		Vojvodić 57'

Arena Petrol, Celje
Attendance: 603
Referee: Valery Vyalichka (Belarus)

20 June 2004

Vllaznia (Albania)	1–2	(Israel) Hapoel Be'er Sheva
Salihi 2'		Vaknin 65'; Sagron 90'

Loro Boriçi Stadium, Shkodër
Attendance: 6,000
Referee: Drago Kos (Slovenia)

19 June 2004

Ethnikos Achna (Cyprus)	1–5	(North Macedonia) Vardar
Apostolou 56'		Wandeir 47', 71'; Katzis 57' (o.g.); Načevski 89'; Serafimovski 90'

Dasaki Stadium, Achna
Attendance: 500
Referee: Richard Havrilla (Slovakia)

19 June 2004

Hibernians (Malta)	2–1	(Croatia) Slaven Belupo
Scerri 14'; Schembri 64'		Posavec 42' (pen.)

Hibernians Stadium, Paola
Attendance: 500
Referee: Gabriele Rossi (San Marino)

20 June 2004

Sant Julià (Andorra)	0–8	(Serbia and Montenegro) Sartid
		Mirosavljević 18', 67', 71' (pen.); Zečević 43', 60'; Radosavljević 53'; Cristian 57' (o.g.); Jevtić 74'

Estadi Comunal d'Andorra la Vella, Andorra la Vella
Attendance: 308
Referee: Lawrence Sammut (Malta)

20 June 2004

Marek Dupnitsa (Bulgaria)	0–0	(Georgia (country)) Dila Gori

Bonchuk Stadium, Dupnitsa
Attendance: 510
Referee: János Megyebíró (Hungary)

20 June 2004

Spartak Moscow (Russia)	2–0	(Lithuania) Atlantas
Pogrebnyak 6' (pen.); Leshonok 34'

Luzhniki Stadium, Moscow
Attendance: 2,000
Referee: Michael Svendsen (Denmark)

19 June 2004

Sopron (Hungary)	1–0	(Czech Republic) Teplice
Balaskó 64' (pen.)

Stadion Városi, Sopron
Attendance: 850
Referee: Sokol Jareci (Albania)

20 June 2004

Thun (Switzerland)	2–0	(Romania) Gloria Bistriţa
Lustrinelli 63'; Raimondi 65'

Stadion Lachen, Thun
Attendance: 1,000
Referee: Bruno Paixão (Portugal)

20 June 2004

MyPa (Finland)	1–1	(Czech Republic) Tescoma Zlín
Puhakainen 79'		Gomes 65'

Kymenlaakson Sähkö Stadion, Anjalankoski
Attendance: 1,076
Referee: Sergey Shmolik (Belarus)

20 June 2004

Schwarz-Weiß Bregenz (Austria)	0–3	(Azerbaijan) Khazar Universiteti
Ikanović 14', 23'; Pircher 33'; Schepens 45' (pen.)

Casino Stadium, Bregenz
Attendance: 1,500
Referee: Novo Panić (Bosnia and Herzegovina)

The game was awarded 3–0 to Khazar Universiteti due to Schwarz-Weiß Bregenz fielding an ineligible player.

19 June 2004

Spartak Trnava (Slovakia)	3–0	(Hungary) Debrecen
Molnár 10'; Kriss 48'; Masaryk 90'

Štadión Antona Malatinského, Trnava
Attendance: 1,078
Referee: Raivo Lattik (Estonia)

20 June 2004

Odra Wodzisław (Poland)	1–0	(Belarus) Dinamo Minsk
Kubisz 38'

MOSiR Stadium, Wodzisław Śląski
Attendance: 1,100
Referee: Per Ivar Staberg (Norway)

20 June 2004

Teuta (Albania)	0–0	(Slovakia) ZTS Dubnica

Niko Dovana Stadium, Durrës
Attendance: 2,000
Referee: Christoforos Zografos (Greece)

20 June 2004

Gent (Belgium)	2–1	(Iceland) Fylkir
Ribus 66', 90'		Kolbeinsson 75' (pen.)

Jules Ottenstadion, Ghent
Attendance: 2,012
Referee: Andriy Shandor (Ukraine)

19 June 2004

Cork City (Republic of Ireland)	3–1	(Sweden) Malmö FF
O'Flynn 10'; Murray 35', 61'		Lukanović 85'

Turners Cross, Cork
Attendance: 3,800
Referee: Marijo Strahonja (Croatia)

20 June 2004

Vėtra (Lithuania)	3–0	(Estonia) Narva Trans
Vasiliauskas 13', 75'; Karvelis 17'

Žalgiris Stadium, Vilnius
Attendance: 550
Referee: David McKeon (Republic of Ireland)

20 June 2004

Odense (Denmark)	0–0	(Northern Ireland) Ballymena United

Odense Atletikstadion, Odense
Attendance: 1,197
Referee: José Luis Mengual Prades (Andorra)

20 June 2004

Grevenmacher (Luxembourg)	1–1	(Finland) Tampere United
Schmitt 37'		Wiss 65'

Stade Josy Barthel, Luxembourg City
Attendance: 500
Referee: Pavel Saliy (Kazakhstan)

19 June 2004

Aberystwyth Town (Wales)	0–0	(Latvia) Dinaburg

Latham Park, Newtown
Attendance: 636
Referee: Gylfi Thór Orrason (Iceland)

19 June 2004

Esbjerg (Denmark)	3–1	(Faroe Islands) NSÍ Runavík
Lucena 4'; Barslund 36', 38'		Højgaard 30'

Esbjerg Atletikstadion, Esbjerg
Attendance: 925
Referee: Adrian Casha (Malta)

=== Second leg ===
27 June 2004

Sloboda Tuzla (Bosnia and Herzegovina)	1–0	(Slovenia) Publikum Celje
Sarajlić 3'

Novi Gradski Stadion, Ugljevik
Attendance: 1,000
Referee: Marek Mikołajewski (Poland)

2–2 on aggregate, Sloboda Tuzla won on away goals rule.

26 June 2004

Hapoel Be'er Sheva (Israel)	0–3	(Albania) Vllaznia
		Salihi 40'

Haberfeld Stadium, Rishon LeZion
Attendance: 360
Referee: Costas Theodotou (Cyprus)

The game was awarded 3–0 to Vllaznia due to Hapoel fielding an ineligible player. Vllaznia won 4–2 on aggregate.

26 June 2004

Vardar (North Macedonia)	5–1	(Cyprus) Ethnikos Achna
Wandeir 3' (pen.), 21', 30', 66'; Gjoševski 16'		Kounnoushi 25'

Gradski Stadion, Skopje
Attendance: 1,000
Referee: Augustus Constantin (Romania)

Vardar won 10–2 on aggregate.

26 June 2004

Slaven Belupo (Croatia)	3–0	(Malta) Hibernians
Vručina 15'; Višković 82' (pen.); Mijatović 88'

Gradski stadion, Koprivnica
Attendance: 800
Referee: Delce Jakimovski (Macedonia)

Slaven Belupo won 4–2 on aggregate.

26 June 2004

Sartid (Serbia and Montenegro)	3–0	(Andorra) Sant Julià
Zečević 5', 42'; Mirosavljević 27'

Stadion Sartida, Smederevo
Attendance: 2,100
Referee: Brian Lawlor (Wales)

Sartid won 11–0 on aggregate.

27 June 2004

Dila Gori (Georgia (country))	0–2	(Bulgaria) Marek Dupnitsa
		Pargov 42', 90'

Mikheil Meskhi Stadium, Tbilisi
Attendance: 1,100
Referee: Radek Matějek (Czech Republic)

Marek Dupnitsa won 2–0 on aggregate.

27 June 2004

Atlantas (Lithuania)	1–0	(Russia) Spartak Moscow
Navikas 80'

Klaipėdos centrinis stadionas, Klaipėda
Attendance: 3,200
Referee: Dejan Stanišić (Serbia and Montenegro)

Spartak Moscow won 2–1 on aggregate.

27 June 2004

Teplice (Czech Republic)	3–1	(Hungary) Sopron
Veleba 29', 40'; Lambulić 34' (o.g.)		Sira 10'

Na Stínadlech, Teplice
Attendance: 1,610
Referee: Serge Gumienny (Belgium)

Teplice won 3–2 on aggregate.

27 June 2004

Gloria Bistriţa (Romania)	0–0	(Switzerland) Thun

Stadionul Gloria, Bistrița
Attendance: 300
Referee: Ivan Bebek (Croatia)

Thun won 2–0 on aggregate.

27 June 2004

Tescoma Zlín (Czech Republic)	3–2	(Finland) MyPa
Lička 2'; Červenka 3'; Gomes 57'		Taipale 67'; Tarvajärvi 71'

Stadion SK Hanácká Slavia Kroměříž, Kroměříž
Attendance: 1,300
Referee: Ghenadie Orlic (Moldova)

Tescoma Zlín won 4–3 on aggregate.

26 June 2004

Khazar Universiteti (Azerbaijan)	2–1	(Austria) Schwarz-Weiß Bregenz
Pircher 29' (o.g.); Abdullayev 68'		Schepens 51' (pen.)

Shafa Stadion, Baku
Attendance: 2,000
Referee: Bülent Demirlek (Turkey)

Khazar Universiteti won 5–1 on aggregate.

27 June 2004

Debrecen (Hungary)	4–1	(Slovakia) Spartak Trnava
Bajzát 27'; Éger 35'; Madar 77'; Bogdanović 84'		Kriss 43'

Stadion Oláh Gábor Út, Debrecen
Attendance: 2,000
Referee: Robert Johnsdorf (Luxembourg)

4–4 on aggregate, Spartak Trnava won on away goals rule.

27 June 2004

Dinamo Minsk (Belarus)	2–0	(Poland) Odra Wodzisław
Tsyhalka 43'; Valadzyankow 75'

Dinamo Stadium, Minsk
Attendance: 2,700
Referee: Iain Brines (Scotland)

Dinamo Minsk won 2–1 on aggregate.

27 June 2004

ZTS Dubnica (Slovakia)	4–0	(Albania) Teuta
Ižvolt 2', 65'; Švestka 47'; Porázik 68'

Mestský štadión, Dubnica nad Váhom
Attendance: 2,250
Referee: Lassin Isaksen (Faroe Islands)

ZTS Dubnica won 4–0 on aggregate.

26 June 2004

Fylkir (Iceland)	0–1	(Belgium) Gent
		Martens 26'

Laugardalsvöllur, Reykjavík
Attendance: 581
Referee: Emil Laursen (Denmark)

Gent won 3–1 on aggregate.

27 June 2004

Malmö FF (Sweden)	0–1	(Republic of Ireland) Cork City
		Kearney 60'

Malmö Stadion, Malmö
Attendance: 2,258
Referee: Aleksandr Gvardis (Russia)

Cork City won 4–1 on aggregate.

26 June 2004

Narva Trans (Estonia)	0–1	(Lithuania) Vėtra
		Litvinas 87'

A. Le Coq Arena, Tallinn
Attendance: 200
Referee: Brage Sandmoen (Norway)

Vėtra won 4–0 on aggregate.

26 June 2004

Ballymena United (Northern Ireland)	0–7	(Denmark) Odense
		Miti 25', 65', 87'; Højer 33', 58'; Pedersen 75'; Borre 80'

Ballymena Showgrounds, Ballymena
Attendance: 2,107
Referee: Egill Már Markússon (Iceland)

Odense won 7–0 on aggregate.

27 June 2004

Tampere United (Finland)	0–0	(Luxembourg) Grevenmacher

Ratinan Stadion, Tampere
Attendance: 3,028
Referee: Zohrab Gadiyev (Azerbaijan)

1–1 on aggregate, Tampere United won on away goals rule.

26 June 2004

Dinaburg (Latvia)	4–0	(Wales) Aberystwyth Town
Ryzhevski 17'; Musajevs 53', 57'; Logins 76'

Celtnieks Stadium, Daugavpils
Attendance: 500
Referee: Karel Vidlák (Czech Republic)

Dinaburg won 4–0 on aggregate.

26 June 2004

NSÍ Runavík (Faroe Islands)	0–4	(Denmark) Esbjerg
		Kristiansen 26', 74'; Egholm 28'; Poulsen 69'

Svangaskarð, Toftir
Attendance: 500
Referee: Mark Courtney (Northern Ireland)

Esbjerg won 7–1 on aggregate.

== Second round ==
Team 1	Agg.	Team 2	1st leg	2nd leg
Westerlo (Belgium)	0–3	(Czech Republic) Tescoma Zlín	0–0	0–3
Hibernian (Scotland)	1–2	(Lithuania) Vėtra	1–1	0–1
Genk (Belgium)	5–1	(Bulgaria) Marek Dupnitsa	2–1	3–0
Odense (Denmark)	0–5	(Spain) Villarreal	0–3	0–2
Teplice (Czech Republic)	1–4	(Russia) Shinnik Yaroslavl	1–2	0–2
ZTS Dubnica (Slovakia)	1–7	(Czech Republic) Slovan Liberec	1–2	0–5
VfL Wolfsburg (Germany)	3–7	(Switzerland) Thun	2–3	1–4
OFK Beograd (Serbia and Montenegro)	5–1	(Latvia) Dinaburg	3–1	2–0
NEC (Netherlands)	0–1	(Republic of Ireland) Cork City	0–0	0–1
Esbjerg (Denmark)	2–1	(France) Nice	1–0	1–1
Spartak Moscow (Russia)	5–1	(Croatia) Kamen Ingrad	4–1	1–0
Tampere United (Finland)	3–1	(Azerbaijan) Khazar Universiteti	3–0	0–1
Dinamo Minsk (Belarus)	4–3	(Serbia and Montenegro) Sartid	1–2	3–1 (a.e.t.)
Spartak Trnava (Slovakia)	3–1	(Bosnia and Herzegovina) Sloboda Tuzla	2–1	1–0
Vardar (North Macedonia)	1–1 (4–3 p)	(Belgium) Gent	1–0	0–1 (a.e.t.)
Slaven Belupo (Croatia)	2–1	(Albania) Vllaznia	2–0	0–1

=== First leg ===
3 July 2004

Westerlo (Belgium)	0–0	(Czech Republic) Tescoma Zlín

Het Kuipje, Westerlo
Attendance: 1,000
Referee: Dragomir Tanović (Serbia and Montenegro)

3 July 2004

Hibernian (Scotland)	1–1	(Lithuania) Vėtra
O'Connor 77'		Sasnauskas 63'

Easter Road, Edinburgh
Attendance: 8,630
Referee: Tony Asumaa (Finland)

4 July 2004

Genk (Belgium)	2–1	(Bulgaria) Marek Dupnitsa
Kpaka 26'; Daerden 67'		Karakanov 65'

Fenix Stadion, Genk
Attendance: 8,538
Referee: Cristian Balaj (Romania)

3 July 2004

Odense (Denmark)	0–3	(Spain) Villarreal
		Anderson 66'; Cazorla 69'; Guayre 87'

Odense Atletikstadion, Odense
Attendance: 523
Referee: Mike Dean (England)

3 July 2004

Teplice (Czech Republic)	1–2	(Russia) Shinnik Yaroslavl
Verbíř 28' (pen.)		Arkhipov 32'; Tumenko 45'

Na Stínadlech, Teplice
Attendance: 1,300
Referee: René Rogalla (Switzerland)

3 July 2004

ZTS Dubnica (Slovakia)	1–2	(Czech Republic) Slovan Liberec
Dovičovič 73'		Hološko 32'; Špendla 66' (o.g.)

Mestský štadión, Dubnica nad Váhom
Attendance: 2,750
Referee: Asaf Kenan (Israel)

3 July 2004

VfL Wolfsburg (Germany)	2–3	(Switzerland) Thun
Schnoor 75'; Präger 88'		Baykal 15'; Ojong 60'; Raimondi 71'

Volkswagen Arena, Wolfsburg
Attendance: 5,087
Referee: Anton Stredák (Slovakia)

4 July 2004

OFK Beograd (Serbia and Montenegro)	3–1	(Latvia) Dinaburg
Kolaković 3', 18'; Tošić 54'		Sokolovs 35'

Omladinski Stadium, Belgrade
Attendance: 601
Referee: Levan Paniashvili (Georgia)

3 July 2004

NEC (Netherlands)	0–0	(Republic of Ireland) Cork City

Stadion de Goffert, Nijmegen
Attendance: 7,500
Referee: Damien Ledentu (France)

3 July 2004

Esbjerg (Denmark)	1–0	(France) Nice
Berglund 2'

Stadion ved Messecenter Herning, Herning
Attendance: 500
Referee: Damir Skomina (Slovenia)

3 July 2004

Spartak Moscow (Russia)	4–1	(Croatia) Kamen Ingrad
Samedov 34'; Pogrebnyak 77'; Petković 82'; Pavlyuchenko 86' (pen.)		Šaranović 83'

Luzhniki Stadium, Moscow
Attendance: 4,000
Referee: Haim Jakov (Israel)

4 July 2004

Tampere United (Finland)	3–0	(Azerbaijan) Khazar Universiteti
Scheweleff 18'; Pohja 54'; Wiss 85'

Ratina Stadium, Tampere
Attendance: 1,450
Referee: Stanislav Sukhina (Russia)

4 July 2004

Dinamo Minsk (Belarus)	1–2	(Serbia and Montenegro) Sartid
Razin 49'		Mirosavljević 12', 62'

Traktor Stadium, Minsk
Attendance: 2,150
Referee: Attila Juhos (Hungary)

3 July 2004

Spartak Trnava (Slovakia)	2–1	(Bosnia and Herzegovina) Sloboda Tuzla
Kopúnek 46'; Fall 79'		Lamešić 77'

Štadión Antona Malatinského, Trnava
Attendance: 988
Referee: Karen Nalbandyan (Armenia)

3 July 2004

Vardar (North Macedonia)	1–0	(Belgium) Gent
Wandeir 90'	Report

Gradski Stadion, Skopje
Attendance: 3,000
Referee: Kostadin Kostadinov (Bulgaria)

3 July 2004

Slaven Belupo (Croatia)	2–0	(Albania) Vllaznia
Dodik 26'; Srpak 51'

Gradski stadion, Koprivnica
Attendance: 600
Referee: Brian Lawlor (Wales)

=== Second leg ===
10 July 2004

Tescoma Zlín (Czech Republic)	3–0	(Belgium) Westerlo
Činčala 20'; Lukaštík 27'; Vangeffelen 86' (o.g.)

Letná Stadion, Zlín
Attendance: 2,350
Referee: Dietmar Drabek (Austria)

Tescoma Zlín won 3–0 on aggregate.

10 July 2004

Vėtra (Lithuania)	1–0	(Scotland) Hibernian
Vasiliauskas 62'

Žalgiris Stadium, Vilnius
Attendance: 1,990
Referee: Krzysztof Slupik (Poland)

Vėtra won 2–1 on aggregate.

10 July 2004

Marek Dupnitsa (Bulgaria)	0–3	(Belgium) Genk

Bonchuk Stadium, Dupnitsa
Attendance: 1,500
Referee: Georgios Borovilos (Greece)

The game was awarded 3–0 to Genk due to Marek Dupnitsa fielding an ineligible player. Genk won 5–1 on aggregate.

10 July 2004

Villarreal (Spain)	2–0	(Denmark) Odense
José Mari 24'; Font 39'

Estadio El Madrigal, Villarreal
Attendance: 4,000
Referee: Wolfgang Sowa (Austria)

Villarreal won 5–0 on aggregate.

10 July 2004

Shinnik Yaroslavl (Russia)	2–0	(Czech Republic) Teplice
Kushev 44' (pen.); Arkhipov 86'

Shinnik Stadium, Yaroslavl
Attendance: 7,000
Referee: Charlie Richmond (Scotland)

Shinnik Yaroslavl won 4–1 on aggregate.

10 July 2004

Slovan Liberec (Czech Republic)	5–0	(Slovakia) ZTS Dubnica
Košťál 6'; Ančic 21'; Hološko 34'; Pospíšil 56'; Papoušek 59'

Stadion u Nisy, Liberec
Attendance: 3,150
Referee: Paulius Malžinskas (Lithuania)

Slovan Liberec won 7–1 on aggregate.

11 July 2004

Thun (Switzerland)	4–1	(Germany) VfL Wolfsburg
Lustrinelli 21'; Renggli 35'; António Carlos 42'; Raimondi 45'		Sarpei 78'

Stadion Lachen, Thun
Attendance: 2,870
Referee: Ben Haverkort (Netherlands)

Thun won 7–3 on aggregate.

10 July 2004

Dinaburg (Latvia)	0–2	(Serbia and Montenegro) OFK Beograd
		Vukotić 61'; Mrdaković 89'

Celtnieks Stadium, Daugavpils
Attendance: 600
Referee: Ismet Arzuman (Turkey)

OFK Beograd won 5–1 on aggregate.

11 July 2004

Cork City (Republic of Ireland)	1–0	(Netherlands) NEC
Doyle 47'

Turners Cross, Cork
Attendance: 6,713
Referee: Sergiy Berezka (Ukraine)

Cork City won 1–0 on aggregate.

11 July 2004

Nice (France)	1–1	(Denmark) Esbjerg
Varrault 45'		Lucena 89'

Stade du Ray, Nice
Attendance: 8,625
Referee: Alan Kelly (Republic of Ireland)

Esbjerg won 2–1 on aggregate.

10 July 2004

Kamen Ingrad (Croatia)	0–1	(Russia) Spartak Moscow
		Pogrebnyak 37'

Stadion Kamen Ingrad, Velika
Attendance: 2,500
Referee: Loizos Loizou (Cyprus)

Spartak Moscow won 5–1 on aggregate.

10 July 2004

Khazar Universiteti (Azerbaijan)	1–0	(Finland) Tampere United
Bakhshiev 85'

Shafa Stadion, Baku
Attendance: 1,015
Referee: Andrejs Sipailo (Latvia)

Tampere United won 3–1 on aggregate.

11 July 2004

Sartid (Serbia and Montenegro)	1–3 (a.e.t.)	(Belarus) Dinamo Minsk
Mirosavljević 89' (pen.)		Razin 45' (pen.); Lentsevich 74'; Shukanov 94'

Stadion Sartida, Smederevo
Attendance: 4,560
Referee: Johny Ver Eecke (Belgium)

Dinamo Minsk won 4–3 on aggregate.

10 July 2004

Sloboda Tuzla (Bosnia and Herzegovina)	0–1	(Slovakia) Spartak Trnava
		Šimko 74'

Novi Gradski Stadion, Ugljevik
Attendance: 900
Referee: David Malcolm (Northern Ireland)

Spartak Trnava won 3–1 on aggregate.

10 July 2004

Gent (Belgium)	1–0 (a.e.t.)	(North Macedonia) Vardar
Gjoševski 90' (o.g.)	Report
Penalties
Mamouni (penalty scored); Ribus (penalty scored); Herpoel (penalty scored); De Coninck (penalty missed); Jaraković (penalty missed)	3–4	(penalty scored) Wandeir; (penalty missed) Gjoševski; (penalty scored) Markoski; (penalty scored) Trajčev; (penalty scored) Masev

Jules Ottenstadion, Gentbrugge
Attendance: 2,806
Referee: Siniša Zrnić (Bosnia and Herzegovina)

1–1 on aggregate. Vardar won 4–3 on penalties.

11 July 2004

Vllaznia (Albania)	1–0	(Croatia) Slaven Belupo
Abilio 7'

Loro Boriçi Stadium, Shkodër
Attendance: 4,500
Referee: Igor Ishchenko (Ukraine)

Slaven Belupo won 2–1 on aggregate.

== Third round ==
Team 1	Agg.	Team 2	1st leg	2nd leg
Tescoma Zlín (Czech Republic)	4–4 (a)	(Spain) Atlético Madrid	2–4	2–0
Nantes (France)	4–2	(Republic of Ireland) Cork City	3–1	1–1
Genk (Belgium)	2–2 (a)	(Germany) Borussia Dortmund	0–1	2–1
Thun (Switzerland)	3–5	(Germany) Hamburg	2–2	1–3
Shinnik Yaroslavl (Russia)	2–6	(Portugal) União de Leiria	1–4	1–2
Schalke 04 (Germany)	7–1	(North Macedonia) Vardar	5–0	2–1
Slovan Liberec (Czech Republic)	2–1	(Netherlands) Roda	1–0	1–1 (a.e.t.)
Lille (France)	4–3	(Belarus) Dinamo Minsk	2–1	2–2
Slaven Belupo (Croatia)	2–2 (a)	(Slovakia) Spartak Trnava	0–0	2–2
Tampere United (Finland)	0–1	(Serbia and Montenegro) OFK Beograd	0–0	0–1
Villarreal (Spain)	3–2	(Russia) Spartak Moscow	1–0	2–2
Vėtra (Lithuania)	1–5	(Denmark) Esbjerg	1–1	0–4

=== First leg ===
17 July 2004

Tescoma Zlín (Czech Republic)	2–4	(Spain) Atlético Madrid
Švach 51', 88'		Novo 1'; Paunović 71', 85'; Musampa 82'

Letná Stadion, Zlín
Attendance: 4,500
Referee: Pasquale Rodomonti (Italy)

18 July 2004

Nantes (France)	3–1	(Republic of Ireland) Cork City
Quint 11'; Ahamada 22'; Da Rocha 65'		Fenn 79'

Stade de la Beaujoire, Nantes
Attendance: 11,056
Referee: João Lopes Ferreira (Portugal)

17 July 2004

Genk (Belgium)	0–1	(Germany) Borussia Dortmund
		Odonkor 42'

Fenix Stadion, Genk
Attendance: 16,832
Referee: Duarte Gomes (Portugal)

17 July 2004

Thun (Switzerland)	2–2	(Germany) Hamburger SV
António Carlos 28'; Raimondi 31' (pen.)		Romeo 50', 85'

Stadion Lachen, Thun
Attendance: 4,150
Referee: Selçuk Dereli (Turkey)

17 July 2004

Shinnik (Russia)	1–4	(Portugal) União de Leiria
Kharitonskiy 16'		Laranjeiro 42'; Felício 73'; Fangueiro 76'; Edson 90'

Shinnik Stadium, Yaroslavl
Attendance: 7,000
Referee: Jonas Eriksson (Sweden)

17 July 2004

Schalke 04 (Germany)	5–0	(North Macedonia) Vardar
Krstajić 19'; Altıntop 40'; Aílton 50'; Kläsener 81'; Tanevski 90' (o.g.)

Arena AufSchalke, Gelsenkirchen
Attendance: 56,054
Referee: Milan Šedivý (Czech Republic)

17 July 2004

Slovan Liberec (Czech Republic)	1–0	(Netherlands) Roda
Papoušek 19'

Stadion u Nisy, Liberec
Attendance: 4,580
Referee: Viktor Kassai (Hungary)

17 July 2004

Lille (France)	2–1	(Belarus) Dinamo Minsk
Plestan 23'; Moussilou 29'		Kovel 26'

Stadium Lille Métropole, Villeneuve-d'Ascq
Attendance: 7,338
Referee: Pieter Vink (Netherlands)

17 July 2004

Slaven Belupo (Croatia)	0–0	(Slovakia) Spartak Trnava

Gradski stadion, Koprivnica
Attendance: 1,000
Referee: Jari Maisonlahti (Finland)

18 July 2004

Tampere United (Finland)	0–0	(Serbia and Montenegro) OFK Beograd

Ratina Stadium, Tampere
Attendance: 3,700
Referee: Joeri Van De Velde (Belgium)

17 July 2004

Villarreal (Spain)	1–0	(Russia) Spartak Moscow
Anderson 51'

Estadio El Madrigal, Villarreal
Attendance: 7,000
Referee: Matteo Trefoloni (Italy)

18 July 2004

Vėtra (Lithuania)	1–1	(Denmark) Esbjerg
Karvelis 68'		Thorup 41'

Vetros Stadium, Vilnius
Attendance: 3,000
Referee: Daniel Stålhammar (Sweden)

=== Second leg ===
24 July 2004

Atlético Madrid (Spain)	0–2	(Czech Republic) Tescoma Zlín
		Malár 11'; Kroča 70'

Vicente Calderón Stadium, Madrid
Attendance: 15,000
Referee: Jörg Keßler (Germany)

4–4 on aggregate, Atlético Madrid won on away goals rule.

24 July 2004

Cork City (Republic of Ireland)	1–1	(France) Nantes
Doyle 6'		Pujol 73'

Turners Cross, Cork
Attendance: 7,500
Referee: Uriah Rennie (England)

Nantes won 4–2 on aggregate.

24 July 2004

Borussia Dortmund (Germany)	1–2	(Belgium) Genk
Dedé 55'		de Camargo 13', 86'

Westfalenstadion, Dortmund
Attendance: 47,800
Referee: Alberto Undiano Mallenco (Spain)

2–2 on aggregate, Genk won on away goals rule.

24 July 2004

Hamburger SV (Germany)	3–1	(Switzerland) Thun
Romeo 2', 72'; Mpenza 66'		Moser 81'

AOL Arena, Hamburg
Attendance: 27,200
Referee: Pascal Garibian (France)

Hamburger SV won 5–3 on aggregate.

24 July 2004

União de Leiria (Portugal)	2–1	(Russia) Shinnik
Felício 36'; Freddy 54'		Lutsenko 61'

Estádio Dr. Magalhães Pessoa, Leiria
Attendance: 3,000
Referee: Alojzije Šupraha (Croatia)

União de Leiria won 6–2 on aggregate.

24 July 2004

Vardar (North Macedonia)	1–2	(Germany) Schalke 04
Wandeir 84'		Pander 4'; Sand 15'

Graski Stadion, Skopje
Attendance: 4,000
Referee: Carlo Bertolini (Switzerland)

Schalke 04 won 7–1 on aggregate.

24 July 2004

Roda (Netherlands)	1–1 (a.e.t.)	(Czech Republic) Slovan Liberec
Cristiano 6'		Hološko 108'

Parkstad Limburg Stadion, Kerkrade
Attendance: 6,850
Referee: Alfonso Pérez Burrull (Spain)

Slovan Liberec won 2–1 on aggregate.

24 July 2004

Dinamo Minsk (Belarus)	2–2	(France) Lille
Razin 33'; Kovel 50'		Moussilou 41', 66'

Dinamo Stadium, Minsk
Attendance: 11,000
Referee: Mikko Vuorela (Finland)

Lille won 4–3 on aggregate.

24 July 2004

Spartak Trnava (Slovakia)	2–2	(Croatia) Slaven Belupo
Kožuch 49'; Ujlaky 58'		Ferenčina 16'; Guć 30'

Štadión Antona Malatinského, Trnava
Attendance: 5,000
Referee: Aleksandr Gvardis (Russia)

2–2 on aggregate, Slaven Belupo won on away goals rule.

24 July 2004

OFK Beograd (Serbia and Montenegro)	1–0	(Finland) Tampere United
Baša 75'

Omladinski Stadium, Belgrade
Attendance: 3,000
Referee: Marian Salomir (Romania)

OFK Beograd won 1–0 on aggregate.

24 July 2004

Spartak Moscow (Russia)	2–2	(Spain) Villarreal
Pavlyuchenko 11', 36'		Anderson 33'; Roger 53'

Luzhniki Stadium, Moscow
Attendance: 12,000
Referee: Craig Thomson (Scotland)

Villarreal won 3–2 on aggregate.

24 July 2004

Esbjerg (Denmark)	4–0	(Lithuania) Vėtra
Berglund 4', 8', 35'; Thorup 48' (pen.)

Stadion ved Messecenter Herning, Herning
Attendance: 3,000
Referee: Knut Kircher (Germany)

Esbjerg won 5–1 on aggregate.

== Semi-finals ==
Team 1	Agg.	Team 2	1st leg	2nd leg
Esbjerg (Denmark)	1–6	(Germany) Schalke 04	1–3	0–3
OFK Beograd (Serbia and Montenegro)	1–5	(Spain) Atlético Madrid	1–3	0–2
Genk (Belgium)	0–2	(Portugal) União de Leiria	0–0	0–2
Villarreal (Spain)	2–0	(Germany) Hamburg	1–0	1–0
Lille (France)	4–1	(Croatia) Slaven Belupo	3–0	1–1
Slovan Liberec (Czech Republic)	2–2 (a)	(France) Nantes	1–0	1–2

=== First leg ===
28 July 2004
18:00

OFK Beograd (Serbia and Montenegro)	1–3	(Spain) Atlético Madrid
Simić 53'	Report	Ibagaza 20'; Torres 40' (pen.); Simeone 66'

Omladinski Stadium, Belgrade
Attendance: 7,000
Referee: Nikolai Ivanov (Russia)

28 July 2004
18:00

Genk (Belgium)	0–0	(Portugal) União de Leiria
	Report

Fenix Stadion, Genk
Attendance: 7,513
Referee: Gianluca Paparesta (Italy)

28 July 2004
19:00

Lille (France)	3–0	(Croatia) Slaven Belupo
Landrin 7'; Moussilou 28'; Ačimovič 47'	Report

Stadium Lille Métropole, Villeneuve-d'Ascq
Attendance: 6,969
Referee: Olegário Benquerença (Portugal)

28 July 2004
19:00

Slovan Liberec (Czech Republic)	1–0	(France) Nantes
Pospíšil 27'	Report

Stadion u Nisy, Liberec
Attendance: 4,750
Referee: Stefan Meßner (Austria)

28 July 2004
19:45

Esbjerg (Denmark)	1–3	(Germany) Schalke 04
Lucena 8'	Report	Aílton 40'; Hanke 71'; Altıntop 87'

Stadion ved Messecenter Herning, Herning
Attendance: 8,000
Referee: Mark Halsey (England)

28 July 2004
22:00

Villarreal (Spain)	1–0	(Germany) Hamburg
Anderson 61' (pen.)	Report

Estadio El Madrigal, Villarreal
Attendance: 11,000
Referee: Johan Verbist (Belgium)

=== Second leg ===
3 August 2004
20:15

Schalke 04 (Germany)	3–0	(Denmark) Esbjerg
Hanke 11'; Altıntop 54'; Asamoah 63'	Report

Arena AufSchalke, Gelsenkirchen
Attendance: 56,320
Referee: Carlos Megía Dávila (Spain)

Schalke 04 won 6–1 on aggregate.

4 August 2004
18:00

Slaven Belupo (Croatia)	1–1	(France) Lille
Pejić 5'	Report	Manchev 52'

Gradski stadion, Koprivnica
Attendance: 2,000
Referee: Peter Sippel (Germany)

Lille won 4–1 on aggregate.

4 August 2004
20:00

União de Leiria (Portugal)	2–0	(Belgium) Genk
Felício 23'; Edson 45'	Report

Estádio Dr. Magalhães Pessoa, Leiria
Attendance: 4,000
Referee: Pascal Garibian (France)

União de Leiria won 2–0 on aggregate.

4 August 2004
20:00

Nantes (France)	2–1	(Czech Republic) Slovan Liberec
Yapi Yapo 5', 44'	Report	Hološko 20'

Stade de la Beaujoire, Nantes
Attendance: 21,857
Referee: Martin Ingvarsson (Sweden)

2–2 on aggregate, Slovan Liberec won on away goals rule.

4 August 2004
20:15

Hamburg (Germany)	0–1	(Spain) Villarreal
	Report	José Mari 69'

AOL Arena, Hamburg
Attendance: 35,296
Referee: Ruud Bossen (Netherlands)

Villarreal won 2–0 on aggregate.

4 August 2004
21:45

Atlético Madrid (Spain)	2–0	(Serbia and Montenegro) OFK Beograd
Torres 10'; Aguilera 50'	Report

Vicente Calderón Stadium, Madrid
Attendance: 25,000
Referee: Philippe Leuba (Switzerland)

Atlético Madrid won 5–1 on aggregate.

== Finals ==
Team 1	Agg.	Team 2	1st leg	2nd leg
Lille (France)	2–0	(Portugal) União de Leiria	0–0	2–0 (a.e.t.)
Schalke 04 (Germany)	3–1	(Czech Republic) Slovan Liberec	2–1	1–0
Villarreal (Spain)	2–2 (3–1 p)	(Spain) Atlético Madrid	2–0	0–2 (a.e.t.)

=== First leg ===
10 August 2004
20:00

Lille (France)	0–0	(Portugal) União de Leiria
	Report

Stadium Lille Métropole, Villeneuve-d'Ascq
Attendance: 10,177
Referee: Paul Allaerts (Belgium)

10 August 2004
20:15

Schalke 04 (Germany)	2–1	(Czech Republic) Slovan Liberec
Aílton 25'; Asamoah 41'	Report	Zápotočný 74'

Arena AufSchalke, Gelsenkirchen
Attendance: 54,136
Referee: Roberto Rosetti (Italy)

10 August 2004
22:00

Villarreal (Spain)	2–0	(Spain) Atlético Madrid
Roger 56'; Rodríguez 77'	Report

Estadio El Madrigal, Villarreal
Attendance: 15,000
Referee: Bertrand Layec (France)

=== Second leg ===
24 August 2004
18:45

Slovan Liberec (Czech Republic)	0–1	(Germany) Schalke 04
	Report	Aílton 87'

Stadion u Nisy, Liberec
Attendance: 7,880
Referee: Yuri Baskakov (Russia)

Schalke 04 won 3–1 on aggregate.

24 August 2004
21:45

Atlético Madrid (Spain)	2–0 (a.e.t.)	(Spain) Villarreal
Ibagaza 47'; García Calvo 58'	Report
Penalties
García Calvo (penalty missed); Sergi (penalty scored); Nano (penalty missed); Arizmendi (penalty missed)	1–3	(penalty scored) Anderson; (penalty scored) Víctor; (penalty scored) Riquelme

Vicente Calderón Stadium, Madrid
Attendance: 45,000
Referee: Vladimír Hriňák (Slovakia)

2–2 on aggregate. Villarreal won 3–1 on penalties.

24 August 2004
22:00

União de Leiria (Portugal)	0–2 (a.e.t.)	(France) Lille
	Report	Moussilou 105'; Ačimovič 116'

Estádio Dr. Magalhães Pessoa, Leiria
Attendance: 12,048
Referee: Georgios Kasnaferis (Greece)

Lille won 2–0 on aggregate.

== See also ==
- 2004–05 UEFA Champions League
- 2004–05 UEFA Cup
