= ROW Rybnik =

ROW Rybnik may refer to:

- KS ROW 1964 Rybnik, an association football team
- KS ROW Rybnik, a motorcycle speedway team
- Basket ROW Rybnik, a women's basketball team
- ROW Rybnik (multi-sports club), a multi-section sports club
