= Aílton (footballer, born 1973) =

Brazilian footballer

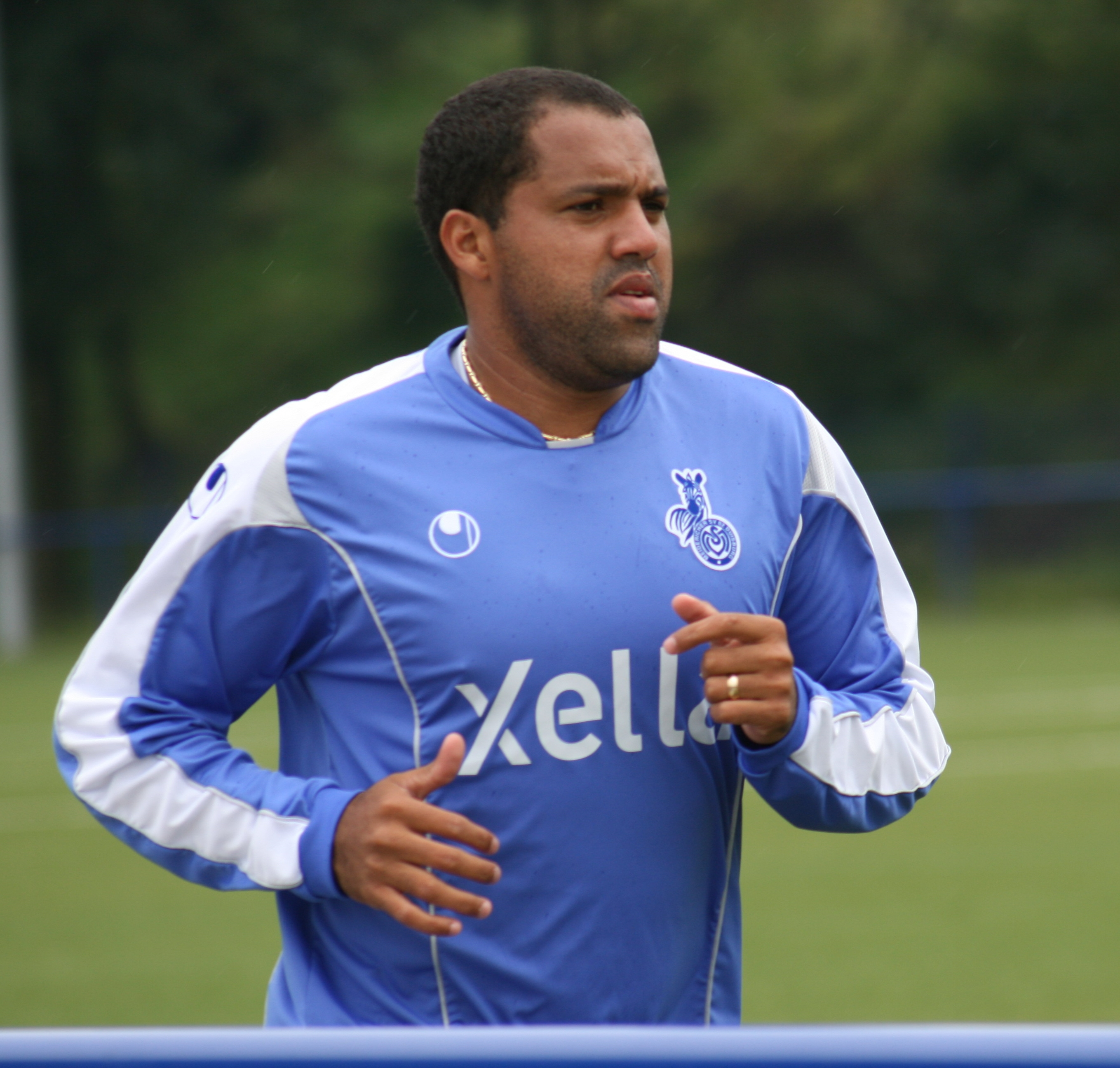
- Aílton at practice with MSV Duisburg in 2007

Personal information
- Full name: Aílton Gonçalves da Silva
- Date of birth: 19 July 1973 (age 53)
- Place of birth: Mogeiro, Brazil
- Height: 1.77 m (5 ft 10 in)
- Position: Striker

Senior career*
Years	Team	Apps	(Gls)
1993–1994	Ypiranga	12	(2)
1994–1995	Internacional	21	(4)
1994–1995	→ Mogi Mirim (loan)	28	(8)
1995–1996	Santa Cruz	21	(7)
1996–1997	Guarani	43	(20)
1997–1998	UANL	23	(5)
1998–2004	Werder Bremen	169	(88)
2004–2005	Schalke 04	29	(14)
2005–2006	Beşiktaş	14	(5)
2006	→ Hamburger SV (loan)	13	(3)
2006–2007	Red Star Belgrade	13	(4)
2007	→ Grasshoppers (loan)	13	(8)
2007–2008	MSV Duisburg	8	(1)
2008–2009	Metalurh Donetsk	2	(1)
2008–2009	→ SCR Altach (loan)	12	(7)
2009	Campinense	1	(1)
2009	Chongqing Lifan	5	(0)
2010	KFC Uerdingen 05	13	(4)
2010–2011	FC Oberneuland	12	(3)
2011	Rio Branco-SP	4	(1)
2012–2013	Hassia Bingen	21	(19)
Total		476	(205)
- * Club domestic league appearances and goals

Aílton Gonçalves da Silva (born 19 July 1973), also known as Kugelblitz ("Ball lightning", due to his rotund physique and fast running speed), is a Brazilian former professional footballer who played as a striker. A journeyman, Aílton began his career in Brazil where he played for Ypiranga, Internacional, Mogi Mirim, Santa Cruz, and Guarani. Following a stint with Tigres UANL in Mexico, he moved to Germany joining SV Werder Bremen. He spent six seasons with Werder Bremen, winning the double of Bundesliga and cup in the 2003–04 season, before transferring to league rivals FC Schalke 04. In the latter stages of his career he played for Beşiktaş, Hamburger SV, Red Star Belgrade, Grasshoppers Zürich, MSV Duisburg, Metalurh Donetsk, SCR Altach, Campinense, and Chongqing Lifan. He ended his career in the lower leagues with KFC Uerdingen 05, FC Oberneuland, Rio Branco-SP, and Hassia Bingen.

After Stéphane Chapuisat and Giovane Élber, Aílton is the third of seven foreign players to have scored more than 100 goals in the Bundesliga, along with Claudio Pizarro, Robert Lewandowski, Vedad Ibišević and Andrej Kramarić.

== Career ==
Aílton's career began in Brazil, and he played in his homeland with Mogi Mirim Esporte Clube, Santa Cruz and Guarani. He then moved to Tigres UANL in Mexico, which made way to a 1998–99 move to SV Werder Bremen in Germany.

He had some difficulties in his first season, managing only two league goals, but developed into a strong service provider. Werder Bremen won the DFB-Pokal in 1999. However, Aílton did not take part in the final, which was won on penalties against Bayern Munich. In 1999–00 he scored twelve goals, 13 in 2000–01, 16 in 2001–02 and 2002–03, the following season bringing with it 28 goals. He won the Bundesliga and the German Cup with Werder Bremen. Due to his achievements at Bremen, he was selected in 2004 as the first foreigner to win the Footballer of the Year (Germany) award. The 2004–05 season saw a lucrative move to FC Schalke 04.

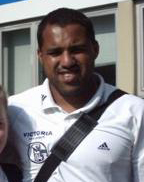
Aílton with Schalke 04

Being uncapped by Brazil, in March 2004 the Qatar Football Association tried to incentivise Aílton to play for their national team by offering him Qatari citizenship, an initial €1 million and €400,000 a year for his services. FIFA intervened and blocked the move, tightening international eligibility requirements as a result.

Aílton has been known as an enfant terrible, giving emotional interviews full of melodrama during his time in Germany.

In July 2005, Rıza Çalımbay brought him to Beşiktaş for €3.5 million, but he failed to show his full potential. Beşiktaş management brought him to the team with high hopes but his lack of scoring touch turned the fans against him and they wanted him replaced with another quality striker as soon as possible. Having failed to find himself a club in January 2006, Aílton had undertaken an escape attempt toward Brazil, but was stopped at the airport by Beşiktaş' interim manager Mehmet Eksi. However, because he had not found a new club during the winter, he returned to Istanbul and faced his old team Werder Bremen in the Efes Cup, scoring a hat trick for Beşiktaş.

He returned to Germany on loan to Hamburger SV in January 2006, but broke his jaw in only his second appearance for the club – an away game against Hannover 96 – and missed most of the remaining season. He scored three times upon his return. As a result, Hamburg did not decide to buy Aílton for a previously agreed sum of €1.75 million.

Aílton had to return to Beşiktaş where he was still out of favour. As a result, he was transferred to Serbian side Red Star Belgrade where he signed on 31 August 2006. In the winter break of the 2006–07 season Aílton was loaned out to Grasshopper Club Zürich. He managed to score eight goals during his spell in Switzerland. Grasshopper announced not to renew Aílton's contract and he was signed by newly promoted Bundesliga side MSV Duisburg in July 2007 on a one-year contract. Unfortunately, he didn't meet the expectations at his new club. He even showed unprofessional conduct by arriving late from the winter break. The contract was cancelled at end of February 2008, he turned to Ukraine and Austria, then signed with Campinense on 12 March 2009. In the summer of 2009, he signed a contract with Chinese side Chongqing Lifan. On 2 December 2009, KFC Uerdingen 05 signed the Brazilian forward until 30 June 2011 but he left on 22 July 2010 for FC Oberneuland. The contract with Oberneuland was terminated in mutual agreement on 4 February 2011.

He joined sixth division side Hassia Bingen for the 2012–13 season where he scored two goals on debut after being substituted in the 68th minute and helped the club attract a league record 1,300 spectators for the game.

== Personal life ==
Aílton's wife Rosseli Judith Rodriguez is Mexican and the couple have four children. In January 2012, he took part on Ich bin ein Star – Holt mich hier raus!, the German version of the television game show I'm a Celebrity...Get Me Out of Here!.

== Career statistics ==
Appearances and goals by club, season and competition
Club	Season	League			National cup (Note: Includes DFB-Pokal, Swiss Cup)		Continental		Other		Total	
Club	Season	Division	Apps	Goals	Apps	Goals	Apps	Goals	Apps	Goals	Apps	Goals
Guarani FC	1996	Série A	23	13	–		–		–		23	13
Guarani FC	1997	Série A	20	7	–		–		–		20	7
Guarani FC	Total		43	20	0	0	0	0	0	0	43	20
Tigres UANL	1998	Mexican Primera División	16	5	–		–		–		16	5
Werder Bremen	1998–99	Bundesliga	12	2	1	0	0	0	–		13	2
Werder Bremen	1999–2000	Bundesliga	29	12	5	3	9 (Note: Appearances in UEFA Cup)	1	2 (Note: Appearances in DFL-Ligapokal)	0	45	16
Werder Bremen	2000–01	Bundesliga	31	14	1	0	3	3	–		35	17
Werder Bremen	2001–02	Bundesliga	33	16	2	2	–		2 (Note: Appearances in UEFA Intertoto Cup)	2	37	20
Werder Bremen	2002–03	Bundesliga	31	16	5	1	4	0	1	0	41	17
Werder Bremen	2003–04	Bundesliga	33	28	6	6	–		4	0	43	34
Werder Bremen	Total		169	88	20	12	16	4	9	2	214	106
Schalke 04	2004–05	Bundesliga	29	14	2	1	7	1	6	4	44	20
Beşiktaş	2005–06	Süper Lig	14	5	0	0	4	2	–		18	7
Hamburger SV (loan)	2005–06	Bundesliga	13	3	0	0	–		–		13	3
Red Star Belgrade	2006–07	Serbian SuperLiga	11	3	0	0	2	1	–		13	4
Grasshoppers (loan)	2006–07	Swiss Super League	13	8	1	0	–		–		14	8
MSV Duisburg	2007–08	Bundesliga	8	1	0	0	–		–		8	1
Metalurh Donetsk	2008–09	Ukrainian Premier League	2	1	0	0	–		–		2	1
SCR Altach (loan)	2008–09	Austrian Bundesliga	12	7	0	0	–		–		12	7
Campinense	2009	Série B	1	1	0	0	–		–		1	1
Chongqing Lifan	2009	Chinese Super League	5	0	0	0	–		–		5	0
KFC Uerdingen 05	2009–10	Oberliga Niederrhein	13	4	0	0	–		–		13	4
FC Oberneuland	2010–11	Regionalliga Nord	12	3	1	0	–		–		13	3
Rio Branco	2011	Campeonato Paulista Série A2	2	1	0	0	–		–		2	1
Career total			363	164	24	13	29	8	15	6	431	191

== Honours ==
Werder Bremen

- Bundesliga: 2003–04
- DFB-Pokal: 1998–99, 2003–04
- DFB-Ligapokal runner-up: 1999

Schalke 04

- UEFA Intertoto Cup: 2004

Red Star Belgrade

- Serbian SuperLiga: 2006–07

Individual

- Bundesliga top scorer: 2003–04
- Footballer of the Year (Germany): 2004
- kicker Bundesliga Team of the Season: 2003–04
