= Franciszek Krótki =

Polish football manager

Personal information
- Date of birth: 28 February 1955 (age 71)
- Place of birth: Radlin, Poland
- Height: 1.76 m (5 ft 9 in)
- Position: Forward

Senior career*
Years	Team	Apps	(Gls)
- ROW Rybnik
- Odra Wodzisław

Managerial career
- 1992–1995: Odra Wodzisław
- 1996: Naprzód Rydułtowy
- 1996–1997: Rymer Rybnik
- 1998–2000: Włókniarz Kietrz
- 2000–2001: Odra Opole
- 2001–2002: Zagłębie Sosnowiec
- 2002: Stal Gorzyce
- 2003–2004: Włókniarz Kietrz
- 2004: Odra Opole
- 2005: Przyszłość Rogów
- 2005–2006: Beskid Skoczów
- 2007–2009: ROW Rybnik
- 2010–2011: Płomień Połomia
- 2011–2012: Cukrownik Chymie
- 2012: Granica Ruptawa
- 2013–2014: Polonia Marklowice
- * Club domestic league appearances and goals

Franciszek Krótki (born 28 February 1955) is a Polish former professional football manager and player.
