= Sarajlić =

Sarajlić is a Bosnian surname derived from the city of Sarajevo. Notable people with the surname include:

- Adnan Sarajlić (born 1981), Bosnian footballer
- Asim Sarajlić (born 1975), Bosnian politician
- Izet Sarajlić (1930–2002), Bosnian historian of philosophy, essayist, translator and poet
- Nafija Sarajlić (1893–1970), first female Bosnian prose writer and poet
- Sead Sarajlić (born 1957), retired Bosnian footballer
