= Veleba =

Veleba (feminine Velebová) is a Czech surname derived from the verb velebit (to praise). Notable people with the surname include:

- Jan Veleba (athlete) (born 1986), Czech athlete
- Jan Veleba (politician), Czech politician
- Pavel Veleba, Czech footballer
