= Łukasz Krakowczyk =

Polish footballer

Personal information
- Full name: Łukasz Krakowczyk
- Date of birth: 21 February 1998 (age 28)
- Place of birth: Rydułtowy, Poland
- Height: 1.78 m (5 ft 10 in)
- Position: Forward

Team information
- Current team: LKS Bełk
- Number: 19

Youth career
- Odra Wodzisław
- 2015–2017: Piast Gliwice

Senior career*
Years	Team	Apps	(Gls)
2017–2021	Piast Gliwice	4	(0)
2018–2019	→ GKS Jastrzębie (loan)	4	(0)
2020	→ Polonia Bytom (loan)	1	(0)
2020–2021	→ ROW Rybnik (loan)	26	(6)
2021–2023	ROW Rybnik	40	(16)
2023–	LKS Bełk	57	(39)
- * Club domestic league appearances and goals as of 12:54, 16 June 2025 (UTC)

Łukasz Krakowczyk (born 21 February 1998) is a Polish professional footballer who plays as a forward for IV liga Silesia club LKS Bełk.

== Career ==
=== Piast Gliwice ===
On 21 January 2020, Krakowczyk was sent out on his second loan spell, this time to Polonia Bytom until 30 June 2020. Making only one appearance for Polonia, he was loaned out again after returning in the summer 2020, this time to ROW 1964 Rybnik for the 2020–21 season.

== Honours ==
ROW Rybnik

- Polish Cup (Rybnik regionals): 2020–21, 2021–22
