= Chwałowice Coal Mine =

Coal mine in Poland

Chwałowice coal mine
- Location within Poland
- Location: Rybnik (Chwałowice), Silesian Voivodeship, Poland; 50°4′12.72″N 18°32′59.64″E
- Products: Coal
- Production: 3,700,000
- Opened: 1897
- Company: Kompania Węglowa

The Chwałowice coal mine is a large mine in the south of Poland in Chwałowice district of Rybnik, Silesian Voivodeship, 294 km south-west of the capital, Warsaw. Chwałowice represents one of the largest coal reserve in Poland having estimated reserves of 243.7 million tonnes of coal. The annual coal production is around 3.7 million tonnes.
