= Marek Kubisz =

Polish footballer

Personal information
- Full name: Marek Kubisz
- Date of birth: 27 February 1974 (age 52)
- Place of birth: Chorzów, Poland
- Height: 1.72 m (5 ft 8 in)
- Position: Striker

Senior career*
Years	Team	Apps	(Gls)
- Stadion Śląski Chorzów
1991–1997	Szombierki Bytom		
1997–2002	GKS Katowice	145	(33)
2002–2003	Szczakowianka Jaworzno	42	(8)
2004–2005	Odra Wodzisław Śląski	36	(8)
2005–2006	Arka Gdynia	14	(1)
2006	GKS Katowice		
2007	Unia Janikowo	17	(3)
2007–2008	Energetyk ROW Rybnik		
2008	GKS Jastrzębie	15	(1)
2009–2010	Ruch Radzionków	12	(1)
2010	Leśnik Kobiór		
2010–2013	Szombierki Bytom		
2013	SFE Freiburg	13	(5)
2015	SF Oberried		
- * Club domestic league appearances and goals

Marek Kubisz (born 27 February 1974) is a Polish former professional footballer who played as a striker.

== Honours ==
Ruch Radzionków

- III liga Opole–Silesian: 2008–09
