= ROW Rybnik (multi-sports club) =

Polish sports club

ROW Rybnik was a multi-sports club from Rybnik, Upper Silesia, Poland, founded in 1964. ROW stands for Rybnicki Okręg Węglowy which means The Rybnik Coal District. It catered for 13 different disciplines upon its establishment. Although no longer one club, several sections have remained active independently, using the "ROW" name. The most popular are the motorcycle speedway and football sections.

== Current sections ==
The original club folded in 1994 but sections of the club have survived or have been created as spiritual successors of the original club are:

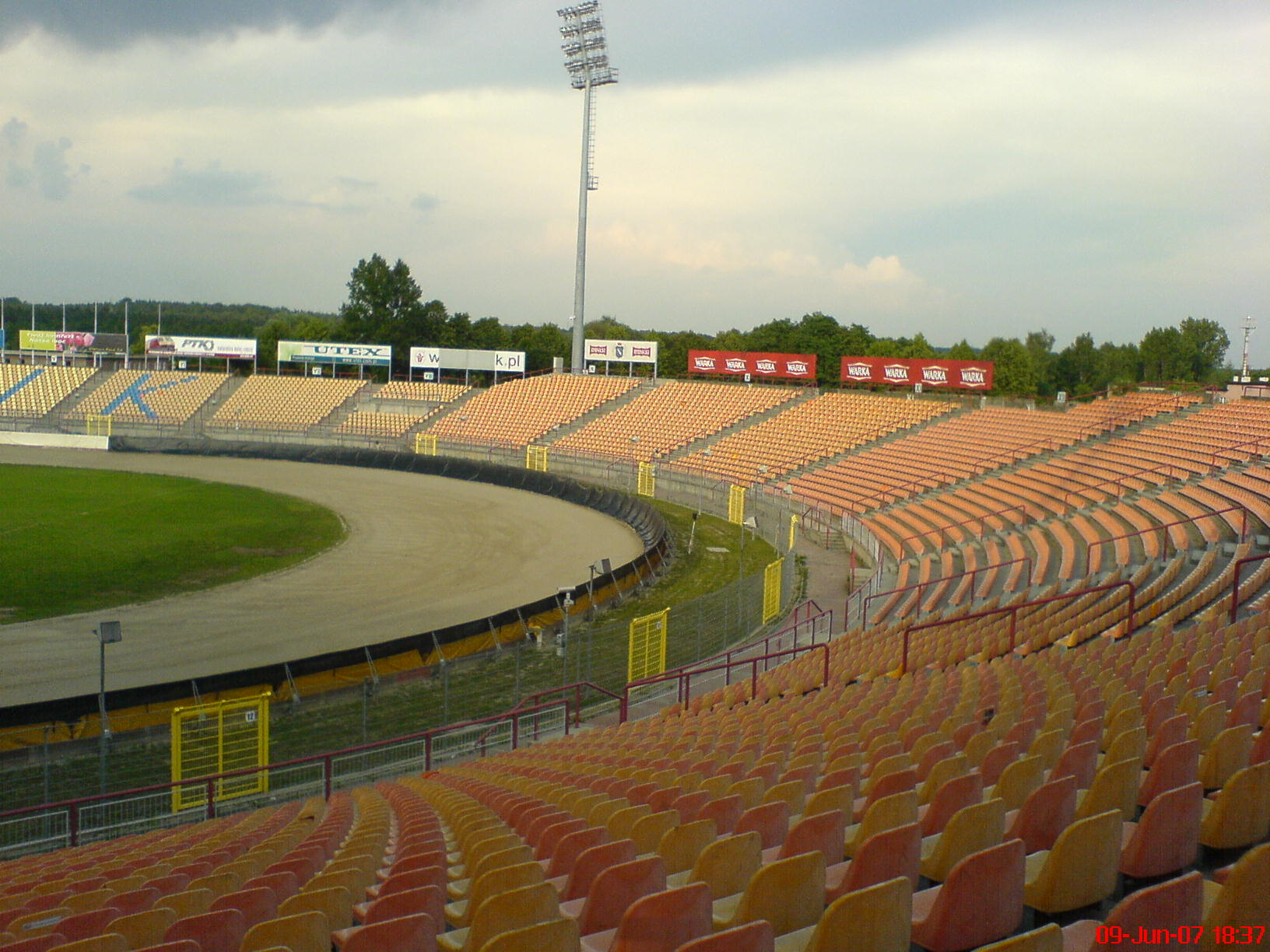
Municipal Stadium in Rybnik, home arena of the speedway and football sections, in 2007

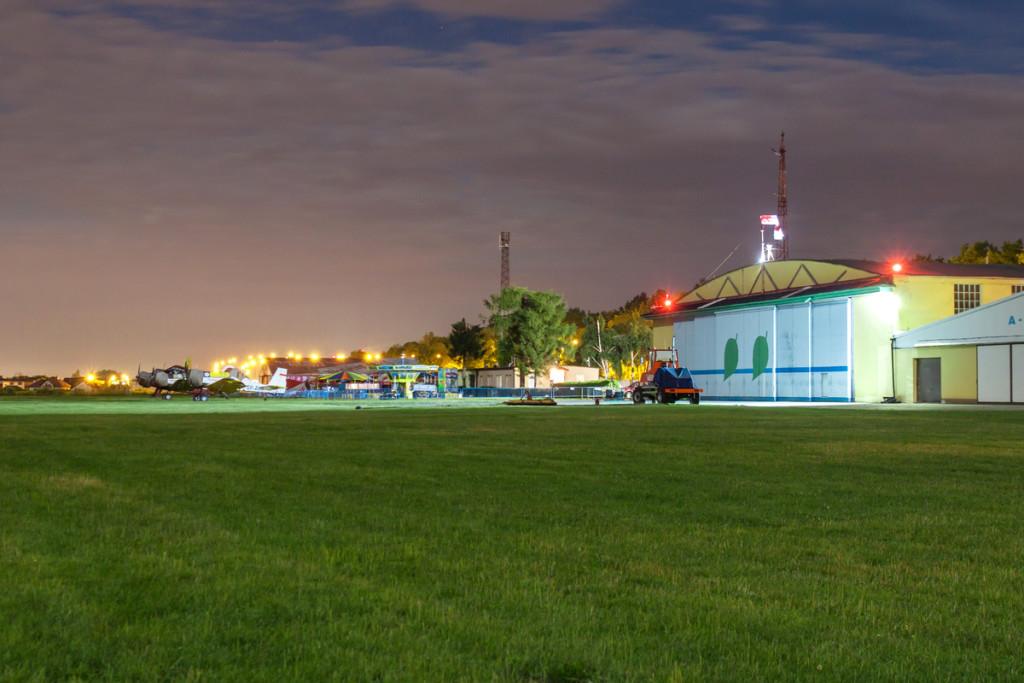
Rybnik-Gotartowice Airfield, sports airfield of the air sports section

- ŻKS ROW Rybnik, one of the oldest and most accomplished teams in Polish speedway. ROW won the Team Speedway Polish Championship 12 times, the last time in 1972.
- KS ROW 1964 Rybnik, men's football section, reestablished in 2003 on the basis of RKS Energetyk Rybnik (founded in 1981) but traces its roots back to the original ROW Rybnik's football section founded in 1964.
- TS ROW Rybnik, women's football section.
- TL ROW Rybnik (Towarzystwo Lekkoatletyczne ROW Rybnik), athletics section.
- Aeroklub ROW Rybnik, aeroclub section of the club which is the only one of the sections to have never dropped the "ROW" prefix throughout its history and has been represented by stars such as Jerzy Makula.

The women's basketball team Basket ROW Rybnik is defunct.

== History ==
The history of ROW dates back to 1920, when a group of Polish activists, who participated in the Silesian Uprisings, formed a sports organization in Rybnik. ROW itself was not formed until 1964, when two sports clubs, Górnik Rybnik and Górnik 23 Chwałowice, from nearby Chwałowice, merged. In its heyday (1970s), ROW Rybnik had 13 departments, including the most popular: football and speedway.

ROW Rybnik was officially created on 6 August 1964, upon the decision of local authorities. Its first manager was an influential coal magnate from Upper Silesia and chairman of Rybnik Union of Coal Industry, Jerzy Kucharczyk. ROW originally had 13 departments, including ski-jumping. Each department was financially supported by a different factory: ROW’s football team was sponsored by the Chwałowice Coal Mine.

The club folded in 1994 and only 4 departments have remained in existence, all acting independently of each other, retaining a historical link to the parent multi-sports club.
