= Rade Vukotić =

Montenegrin footballer

Personal information
- Date of birth: 25 August 1982 (age 44)
- Place of birth: Bijelo Polje, SFR Yugoslavia
- Height: 1.88 m (6 ft 2 in)
- Position: Forward

Senior career*
Years	Team	Apps	(Gls)
- Jedinstvo Bijelo Polje
2001–2005	OFK Beograd	15	(4)
2002–2004	→ Jedinstvo Bijelo Polje (loan)	25	(12)
2005	Gorica	0	(0)
2006	Borac Čačak	4	(0)
2006	Jedinstvo Bijelo Polje	11	(5)
2007	Petrovac	12	(1)
2007	Bežanija	1	(0)
- * Club domestic league appearances and goals

Rade Vukotić (Cyrillic: Раде Вукотић; born 25 August 1982) is a Montenegrin former professional footballer who played as a forward.

== Career ==
Vukotić played with Serbian SuperLiga clubs OFK Beograd, FK Borac Čačak and FK Bežanija, Montenegrin clubs FK Jedinstvo Bijelo Polje and FK Grbalj and Slovenian club HIT Gorica.
