= Ivica Jaraković =

Serbian footballer

Personal information
- Date of birth: 11 June 1978 (age 48)
- Place of birth: Užice, SFR Yugoslavia
- Height: 1.85 m (6 ft 1 in)
- Position: Midfielder

Senior career*
Years	Team	Apps	(Gls)
1997–1998	Sloboda Užice		
1998–2002	Anderlecht	0	(0)
2001–2002	→ RWDM (loan)	23	(6)
2002–2003	Kortrijk		
2003–2005	Gent		
2005	Zulte Waregem		
2005–2007	Kortrijk		
2007–2008	1. FC Magdeburg	19	(4)
2008–2010	OH Leuven	25	(9)
2010	→ Woluwe-Zaventem (loan)		
- * Club domestic league appearances and goals

Ivica Jaraković (born 11 June 1978) is a Serbian-Belgian former professional footballer who played as a midfielder.

Originating from Serbia, Jaraković spent almost his entire career in Belgium, with only a one-year passage with 1. FC Magdeburg in Germany. He is currently living in Serbia but also owns a home in Belgium where he returns often, as since 2010 he is working for Kortrijk as a scout, looking for players in the Balkan region.
