= Cristian Roig Mauri =

Andorran footballer

Cristian Roig
Personal information
- Full name: Cristian Roig Mauri
- Date of birth: 23 July 1977 (age 49)
- Place of birth: Andorra
- Position: Defender

Senior career*
Years	Team	Apps	(Gls)
1997–2008	UE Sant Julià		

International career^{‡}
1998	Andorra	1	(0)
- * Club domestic league appearances and goals as of 9 March 2008 ‡ National team caps and goals as of 9 March 2008

Cristian Roig Mauri (born 23 July 1977) is a former Andorran international footballer. He was capped for Andorra in 1998.
