= Vytautas Karvelis =

Lithuanian footballer (born 1972)

Personal information
- Date of birth: 1 April 1972 (age 54)
- Height: 1.88 m (6 ft 2 in)
- Position: Striker

Senior career*
Years	Team	Apps	(Gls)
1990–1996	FK Žalgiris	97	(25)
1993	→ FK Geležinis Vilkas (loan)	2	(0)
1997	Videoton FC	8	(0)
1998	Lokomotyvas Vilnius	13	(6)
1998	FBK Kaunas	2	(0)
1999	Shenzhen Pingan	19	(6)
2000	FK Žalgiris	9	(6)
2000	KSZO Ostrowiec Świętokrzyski	9	(0)
2001	Hapoel Tzafririm Holon	12	(1)
2001–2004	FK Vetra		

International career
1991–1998	Lithuania	7	(0)
- * Club domestic league appearances and goals

Vytautas Karvelis (born 1 April 1972) is a Lithuanian former football striker.
