= Basket ROW Rybnik =

Polish women's basketball team

Basket ROW Rybnik is a Polish women's basketball team from Rybnik, Upper Silesia currently playing in the PLKK, the top division. It is related to the ROW Rybnik multi-sports club founded in 1964, however after a long period of inactivity basketball in Rybnik only returned in 1997 without the "ROW" name.

== History ==
ROW Rybnik was founded in 1964 as a multi-sports club as a result of a merger between RKS "Górnik" Chwałowice and KS "Górnik" Rybnik .

In 1997 Koszykarski Klub Sportowy Partners Rybnik gained promotion to the PLKK. After the next three years in the top division as KKS ColorCap Rybnik, the club folded due to the sponsor pulling out. In 2006 Rybnik's basketball players returned to the courts once again, now under the "ROW" name. First as Utex ROW Rybnik, then as KK ROW Rybnik, and from 2013 as Basket ROW Rybnik.
