= Oren Sagron =

Israeli footballer

Oren Sagron אורן סגרון
Personal information
- Full name: Oren Sagron
- Date of birth: 12 July 1972 (age 54)
- Place of birth: Be'er Sheva, Israel
- Height: 1.78 m (5 ft 10 in)
- Positions: Winger; forward

Youth career
- Hapoel Be'er Sheva

Senior career*
| Years | Team | Apps | (Gls) |
| 1991–1998 | Hapoel Be'er Sheva | 121 | (27) |
| 1998–2001 | Beitar Be'er Sheva | | |
| 2001–2005 | Hapoel Be'er Sheva | 75 | (3) |
| 2005–2007 | Maccabi Be'er Sheva | 16 | (1) |

International career^{‡}
| 1992–1993 | Israel U21 | 5 | (0) |
- * Club domestic league appearances and goals as of 27 July 2015 ‡ National team caps and goals as of 27 July 2015

Oren Sagron (Hebrew: אורן סגרון; born 12 July 1972) is an Israeli former professional footballer that has played in Hapoel Be'er Sheva.

He is of a Tunisian-Jewish descent.

== Honours ==
=== Club ===
Hapoel Beer Sheva

- Premier League:
  - Third place (3): 1993/1994, 1994/1995, 1996/1997
- State Cup:
  - Winners (1): 1996/1997
  - Runners-up (1): 2002/2003
- Toto Cup:
  - Winners (1): 1995/1996
