= 1998–99 SV Werder Bremen season =

SV Werder Bremen
1998–99 season
- Manager: Wolfgang Sidka (until 20 October); Felix Magath (from 22 October)
- Stadium: Weser-Stadion
- Bundesliga: 13th
- DFB-Pokal: Winners
- UEFA Intertoto Cup: Winners
- Top goalscorer: League: Marco Bode (8); All: Marco Bode (13)
- Biggest win: Werder Bremen 4–1 Inkaras Kaunas; Werder Bremen 4–1 1860 Munich; Werder Bremen 4–1 Borussia Mönchengladbach
- Biggest defeat: 1. FC Kaiserslautern 4–0 Werder Bremen
Home colours	Away colours	Third colours

The 1998–99 season was the 100th season in the history of SV Werder Bremen and the club's 18th consecutive season in the top flight of German football.

== Competitions ==
=== Overall record ===
Competition	First match	Last match	Starting round	Final position	Record							
Competition	First match	Last match	Starting round	Final position	Pld	W	D	L	GF	GA	GD	Win %
Bundesliga	16 August 1998	29 May 1999	Matchday 1	13th	34	10	8	16	41	47	−6	29.41
DFB-Pokal	29 August 1998	12 June 1999	First round	Winners	6	5	1	0	12	7	+5	83.33
Intertoto Cup	4 July 1998	25 August 1998	Group stage	Winners	8	7	1	0	18	4	+14	87.50
Total					48	22	10	16	71	58	+13	45.83

Source: Competitions

=== Bundesliga ===
==== League table ====
Pos	Team	Pld	W	D	L	GF	GA	GD	Pts	Qualification or relegation
11	VfB Stuttgart	34	9	12	13	41	48	−7	39	
12	SC Freiburg	34	10	9	15	36	44	−8	39	
13	Werder Bremen	34	10	8	16	41	47	−6	38	Qualification to UEFA Cup first round (Note: Werder Bremen won the DFB-Pokal (domestic cup) and thus qualified for the UEFA Cup.)
14	Hansa Rostock	34	9	11	14	49	58	−9	38	
15	Eintracht Frankfurt	34	9	10	15	44	54	−10	37	

Source: www.dfb.de
Rules for classification: 1) points; 2) goal difference; 3) number of goals scored.

==== Results by round ====
Round	1	2	3	4	5	6	7	8	9	10	11	12	13	14	15	16	17	18	19	20	21	22	23	24	25	26	27	28	29	30	31	32	33	34
Ground	A	H	A	H	A	H	A	H	A	H	H	A	H	A	H	A	H	H	A	H	A	H	A	H	A	H	A	A	H	A	H	A	H	A
Result	L	L	L	D	W	L	L	L	D	D	D	W	L	W	W	W	D	W	D	D	L	L	L	L	W	D	L	L	W	L	L	W	W	L
Position	15	17	18	18	15	16	17	18	17	17	17	16	16	16	12	10	11	9	8	8	9	11	12	13	11	12	12	13	13	13	15	14	10	13

Source: DFB
A = Away; H = Home; W = Win; D = Draw; L = Loss

==== Matches ====
16 August 1998 1	Hertha BSC	1–0	Werder Bremen	Berlin
18:00 CEST (UTC+2)				Stadium: Weser-Stadion

21 August 1998 2	Werder Bremen	2–3	1. FC Nürnberg	Bremen
20:00 CEST (UTC+2)				Stadium: Weser-Stadion

8 September 1998 3	VfL Bochum	2–0	Werder Bremen	Bochum
20:00 CEST (UTC+2)				Stadium: Weser-Stadion

12 September 1998 4	Werder Bremen	2–2	Bayer Leverkusen	Bremen
15:30 CEST (UTC+2)				Stadium: Weser-Stadion

19 September 1998 5	VfL Wolfsburg	2–4	Werder Bremen	Wolfsburg
15:30 CEST (UTC+2)				Stadium: Weser-Stadion

26 September 1998 6	Werder Bremen	0–1	Bayern Munich	Bremen
15:30 CEST (UTC+2)				Stadium: Weser-Stadion

3 October 1998 7	Hansa Rostock	2–1	Werder Bremen	Rostock
15:30 CEST (UTC+2)				Stadium: Ostseestadion

17 October 1998 8	Werder Bremen	2–3	SC Freiburg	Bremen
15:30 CEST (UTC+2)				Stadium: Weser-Stadion

23 October 1998 9	Hamburger SV	1–1	Werder Bremen	Hamburg
20:00 CEST (UTC+2)				Stadium: Ostseestadion

31 October 1998 10	Werder Bremen	1–1	MSV Duisburg	Bremen
15:30 CEST (UTC+2)				Stadium: Weser-Stadion

6 November 1998 11	Werder Bremen	1–1	Borussia Dortmund	Bremen
20:00 CEST (UTC+2)				Stadium: Weser-Stadion

13 November 1998 13	Werder Bremen	0–1	1. FC Kaiserslautern	Bremen
20:00 CEST (UTC+2)				Stadium: Weser-Stadion

20 November 1998 14	Eintracht Frankfurt	0–2	Werder Bremen	Frankfurt
20:00 CEST (UTC+2)				Stadium: Ostseestadion

24 November 1998 12	Schalke 04	1–2	Werder Bremen	Gelsenkirchen
20:00 CEST (UTC+2)				Stadium: Ostseestadion

28 November 1998 15	Werder Bremen	4–1	1860 Munich	Bremen
15:30 CEST (UTC+2)				Stadium: Weser-Stadion

8 December 1998 16	Borussia Mönchengladbach	0–1	Werder Bremen	Mönchengladbach
20:00 CEST (UTC+2)				Stadium: Ostseestadion

12 December 1998 17	Werder Bremen	2–2	VfB Stuttgart	Bremen
15:30 CEST (UTC+2)				Stadium: Weser-Stadion

20 December 1998 18	Werder Bremen	2–1	Hertha BSC	Bremen
18:00 CEST (UTC+2)				Stadium: Weser-Stadion

20 February 1999 19	1. FC Nürnberg	1–1	Werder Bremen	Nuremberg
15:30 CEST (UTC+2)				Stadium: Weser-Stadion

26 February 1999 20	Werder Bremen	1–1	VfL Bochum	Bremen
20:00 CEST (UTC+2)				Stadium: Weser-Stadion

7 March 1999 21	Bayer Leverkusen	2–0	Werder Bremen	Leverkusen
18:00 CEST (UTC+2)				Stadium: Weser-Stadion

13 March 1999 22	Werder Bremen	0–1	VfL Wolfsburg	Bremen
15:30 CEST (UTC+2)				Stadium: Weser-Stadion

20 March 1999 23	Bayern Munich	1–0	Werder Bremen	Leverkusen
15:30 CEST (UTC+2)				Stadium: Weser-Stadion

3 April 1999 24	Werder Bremen	0–3	Hansa Rostock	Bremen
15:30 CEST (UTC+2)				Stadium: Weser-Stadion

9 April 1999 25	SC Freiburg	0–2	Werder Bremen	Freiburg
20:00 CEST (UTC+2)				Stadium: Weser-Stadion

13 April 1999 26	Werder Bremen	0–0	Hamburger SV	Bremen
20:00 CEST (UTC+2)				Stadium: Weser-Stadion

17 April 1999 27	MSV Duisburg	2–0	Werder Bremen	Duisburg
15:30 CEST (UTC+2)				Stadium: Weser-Stadion

23 April 1999 28	Borussia Dortmund	2–1	Werder Bremen	Dortmund
20:00 CEST (UTC+2)				Stadium: Weser-Stadion

4 May 1999 30	1. FC Kaiserslautern	4–0	Werder Bremen	Kaiserslautern
20:00 CEST (UTC+2)				Stadium: Weser-Stadion

7 May 1999 31	Werder Bremen	1–2	Eintracht Frankfurt	Bremen
20:00 CEST (UTC+2)				Stadium: Weser-Stadion

11 May 1999 29	Werder Bremen	1–0	Schalke 04	Bremen
20:00 CEST (UTC+2)				Stadium: Weser-Stadion

15 May 1999 32	1860 Munich	1–3	Werder Bremen	Munich
15:30 CEST (UTC+2)				Stadium: Weser-Stadion

22 May 1999 33	Werder Bremen	4–1	Borussia Mönchengladbach	Bremen
15:30 CEST (UTC+2)				Stadium: Weser-Stadion

29 May 1999 34	VfB Stuttgart	1–0	Werder Bremen	Stuttgart
15:30 CEST (UTC+2)				Stadium: Gottlieb-Daimler-Stadion; Attendance: 38,000; Referee: Lutz Michael Frohlich

=== DFB-Pokal ===
29 August 1998 First round	Bayer Leverkusen II	1–2 (a.e.t.)	Werder Bremen	Leverkusen
--:-- CEST (UTC+2)				Stadium: Weser-Stadion

22 September 1998 Second round	Werder Bremen	3–2	Hansa Rostock	Bremen
--:-- CEST (UTC+2)				Stadium: Weser-Stadion; Attendance: 9,600; Referee: Markus Merk

28 October 1998 Round of 16	Werder Bremen	3–2	Fortuna Düsseldorf	Bremen
--:-- CET (UTC+1)				Stadium: Weser-Stadion; Attendance: 8,400; Referee: Sippel

2 December 1998 Quarter-finals	Werder Bremen	2–1	Tennis Borussia Berlin	Bremen
--:-- CET (UTC+1)				Stadium: Weser-Stadion; Attendance: 9,900; Referee: Hermann Albrecht

10 March 1999 Semi-finals	VfL Wolfsburg	0–1	Werder Bremen	Wolfsburg
--:-- CEST (UTC+2)			Bode 52'	Stadium: VfL-Stadion am Elsterweg; Attendance: 19,900; Referee: Markus Merk

12 June 1999 Final	Bayern Munich	1–1 (a.e.t.) (4–5 p)	Werder Bremen	Berlin
19:30 CEST (UTC+2)	Jancker 45'		Maksymov 4'	Stadium: Olympiastadion; Attendance: 75,841; Referee: Jürgen Aust
	Penalties
	Salihamidžić (penalty scored); Daei (penalty scored); Tarnat (penalty scored); Jancker (penalty scored); Effenberg (penalty missed); Matthäus (penalty missed)		(penalty scored) Bode; (penalty missed) Todt; (penalty scored) Bogdanović; (penalty scored) Wicky; (penalty scored) Eilts; (penalty scored) Rost
