= Asmir Ikanović =

Bosnia and Herzegovina footballer

Personal information
- Full name: Asmir Ikanović
- Date of birth: 30 April 1976 (age 50)
- Place of birth: SFR Yugoslavia
- Height: 1.88 m (6 ft 2 in)
- Position: Defender

Senior career*
Years	Team	Apps	(Gls)
1999–2002	Čelik Zenica	76	(12)
2002–2005	SW Bregenz	60	(0)
2005–2007	Union Weißkirchen	52	(10)
2005–2007	Union Baumgartenberg	88	(30)
2005–2007	ASKÖ Luftenberg	24	(8)
2012–2014	SV Urfahr	48	(44)
2014–2019	ASV Hagenberg	107	(65)
Total		455	(169)

International career^{‡}
2000–2002	Bosnia and Herzegovina	12	(0)
- * Club domestic league appearances and goals ‡ National team caps and goals as of 13 March 2021

Asmir Ikanović (born 30 April 1976) is a retired Bosnian-Herzegovinian association footballer. He played for the national team in the 2002 FIFA World Cup qualification.

== Club career ==
Ikanović played for local side Čelik Zenica, but spent the majority of his career in the Austrian lower leagues. He is currently coaching in the lowest Austrian league with TSV St.Georgen/Gusen

== International career ==
He made his debut for Bosnia and Herzegovina in a March 2000 friendly match away against Jordan and has earned a total of 12 caps, scoring no goals. His final international was a September 2002 European Championship qualification match against Romania.
