= Mogeiro =

Coordinates: 7°18′S 35°28′W

- Municipality
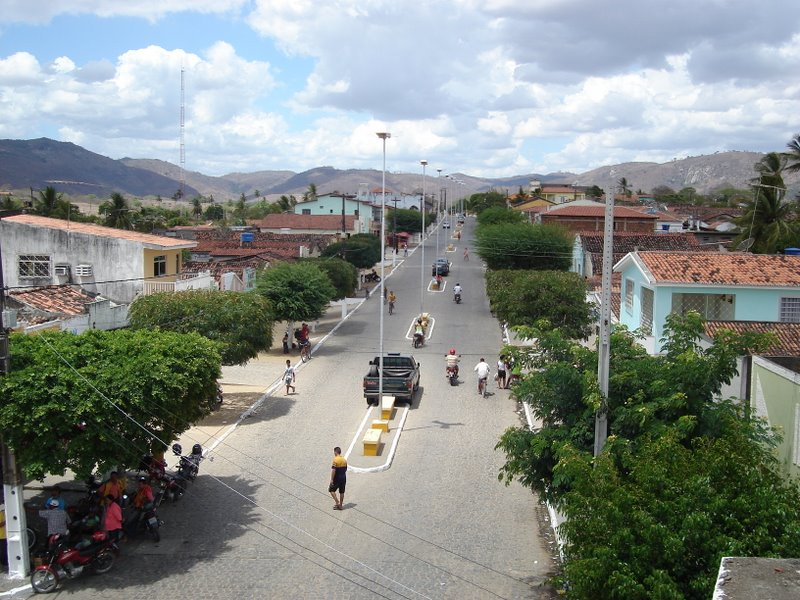
- Street João Pessoa

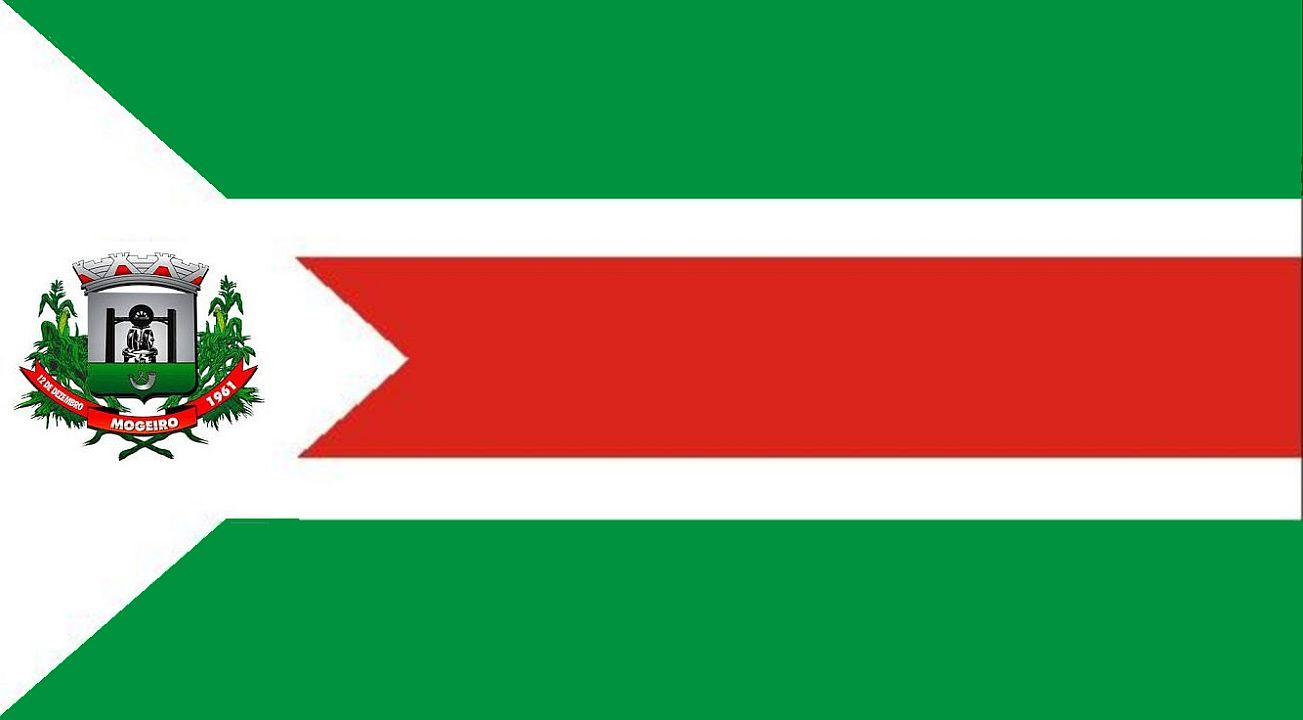
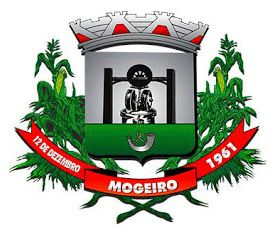
- Flag Coat of arms

- Location of Mogeiro in Paraíba and Brazil
- Country: Brazil
- Region: Northeast
- State: Paraíba
- Mesoregion: Agreste Paraibano

Government
  - Mayor: Antonio José Ferreira (PR)

Population estimate - IBGE/2012
  - Total: 13,178
- Time zone: UTC−3 (BRT)

Mogeiro (Central northeastern portuguese pronunciation: [moˈʒeɾŭ]) is a municipality in the state of Paraíba in the Northeast Region of Brazil.

== See also ==
- List of municipalities in Paraíba
