= Patrick Pircher =

Austrian footballer

Personal information
- Full name: Patrick Pircher
- Date of birth: 7 April 1982 (age 44)
- Place of birth: Bregenz, Austria
- Height: 1.87 m (6 ft 1 1/2 in)
- Position: Defender

Youth career
- 1988–1993: Viktoria Bregenz
- 1993–1995: FC Lauterach
- 1995–1996: FC Hard
- 1996–1999: BNZ Vorarlberg
- 1999–2000: FC Hard

Senior career*
Years	Team	Apps	(Gls)
2000–2003	SC Bregenz	34	(5)
2003–2006	FK Austria Wien	8	(0)
2003–2004	→ FC Superfund (loan)	17	(0)
2004–2005	→ SC Bregenz (loan)	29	(1)
2005–2006	→ Admira (loan)	14	(0)
2006–2008	FC Augsburg	31	(0)
2008–2010	SC Rheindorf Altach	19	(1)
2010–2012	FC Pasching	53	(4)
2012–	FC Dornbirn	20	(2)

International career
2001–2003	Austria U-21	15	(0)
2005	Austria	2	(0)
- * Club domestic league appearances and goals as of 23 December 2012

Patrick Pircher (born 7 April 1982, in Bregenz) is an Austrian footballer playing for FC Dornbirn.

== National team statistics ==
Austria national team
Year	Apps	Goals
2005	2	0
Total	2	0

== Honours ==
- Austrian Football Bundesliga winner: 2002–03
- Austrian Cup winner: 2002–03
