= Adnan Sarajlić =

Bosnian-Herzegovinian footballer

Personal information
- Date of birth: 6 January 1981 (age 45)
- Place of birth: Tuzla, SFR Yugoslavia
- Height: 1.83 m (6 ft 0 in)
- Position: Midfielder

Senior career*
Years	Team	Apps	(Gls)
1998–1999	Zmaj od Bosne Tuzla		
1999–2002	HIT Gorica	7	(1)
2002–2005	Sloboda Tuzla	27+	(7+)
2005–2006	Al-Muharraq		
2006	Sloboda Tuzla	10	(2)
2007	Zadar		
2007	Orašje	13	(2)
2008–2009	Sloboda Tuzla	37	(2)
2010–2013	Budućnost Banovići	27+	(1+)
2013	Gradina		
2014	Proleter Slavinovići		

International career
- Bosnia and Herzegovina U-21
- * Club domestic league appearances and goals

Adnan Sarajlić (born January 6, 1981) is a Bosnian-Herzegovinian retired footballer.

== Club career ==
He came to Budućnost Banovići from Sloboda Tuzla where he was the captain. In August 2013, Sarajlić joined OFK Gradina.
