= Pavel Veleba =

Czech footballer

Personal information
- Date of birth: 6 October 1976 (age 50)
- Place of birth: Roudnice nad Labem, Czechoslovakia
- Height: 1.82 m (6 ft 0 in)
- Position: Forward

Senior career*
Years	Team	Apps	(Gls)
1998–1999	Viktoria Žižkov	2	(0)
1999–2001	Bohemians Praha	14	(2)
2001–2003	FK Ústí nad Labem	52	(12)
2004–2005	FK Teplice	26	(5)
2005	Chmel Blšany	7	(0)
2005–2007	SK Kladno	48	(16)
2007–2008	Shakhter Karagandy	3	(0)
2008	Olympiakos Nicosia	1	(0)
- SK Bezděkov
- * Club domestic league appearances and goals

Pavel Veleba (born 6 October 1976) is a Czech former professional footballer who played as a forward for FK Teplice, Chmel Blšany, SK Kladno, and Olympiakos Nicosia among others.
