= Chwałowice, Rybnik =

Chwałowice
- Rybnik District
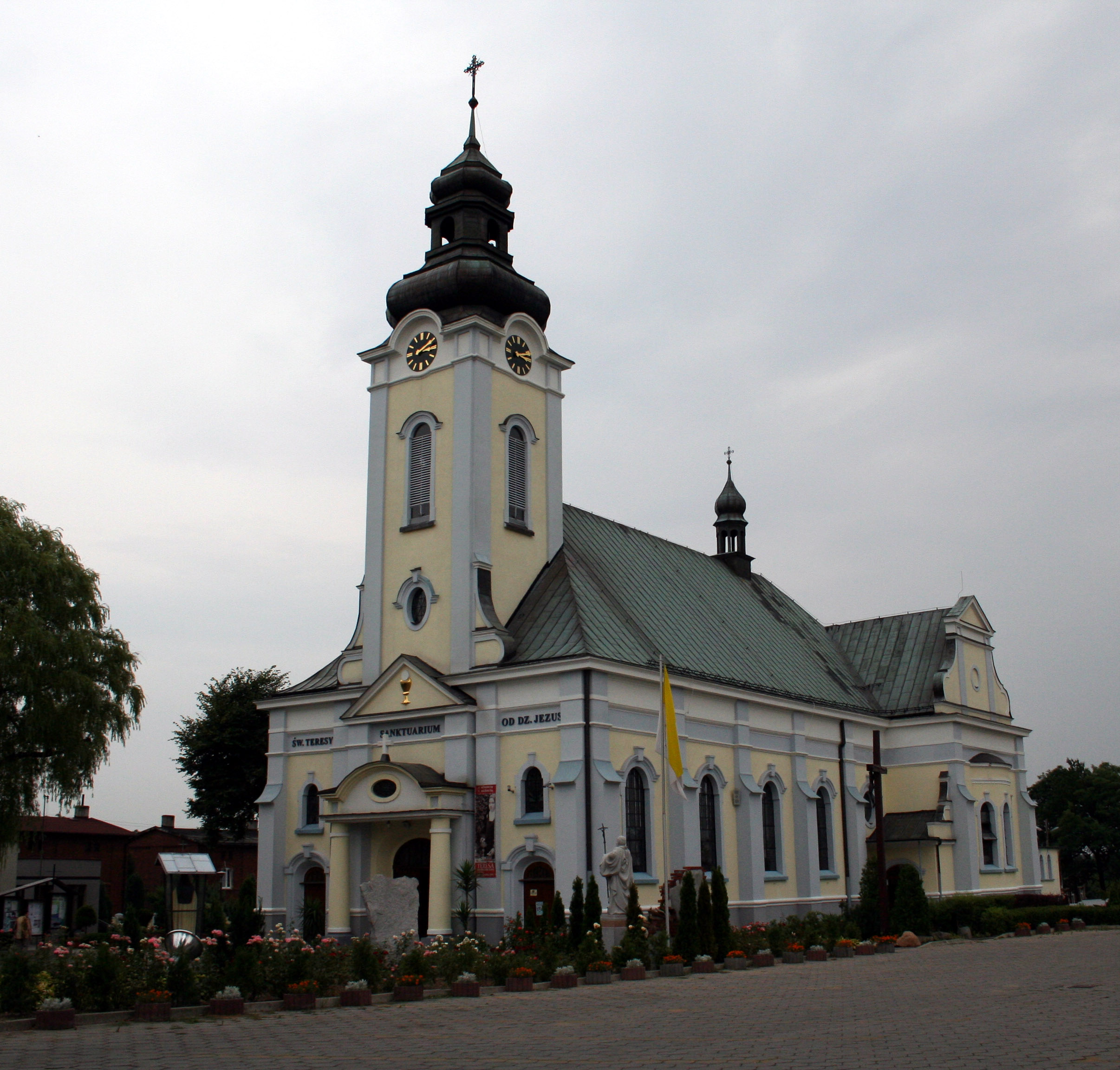
- Saint Thérèse of Lisieux church

- Coat of arms

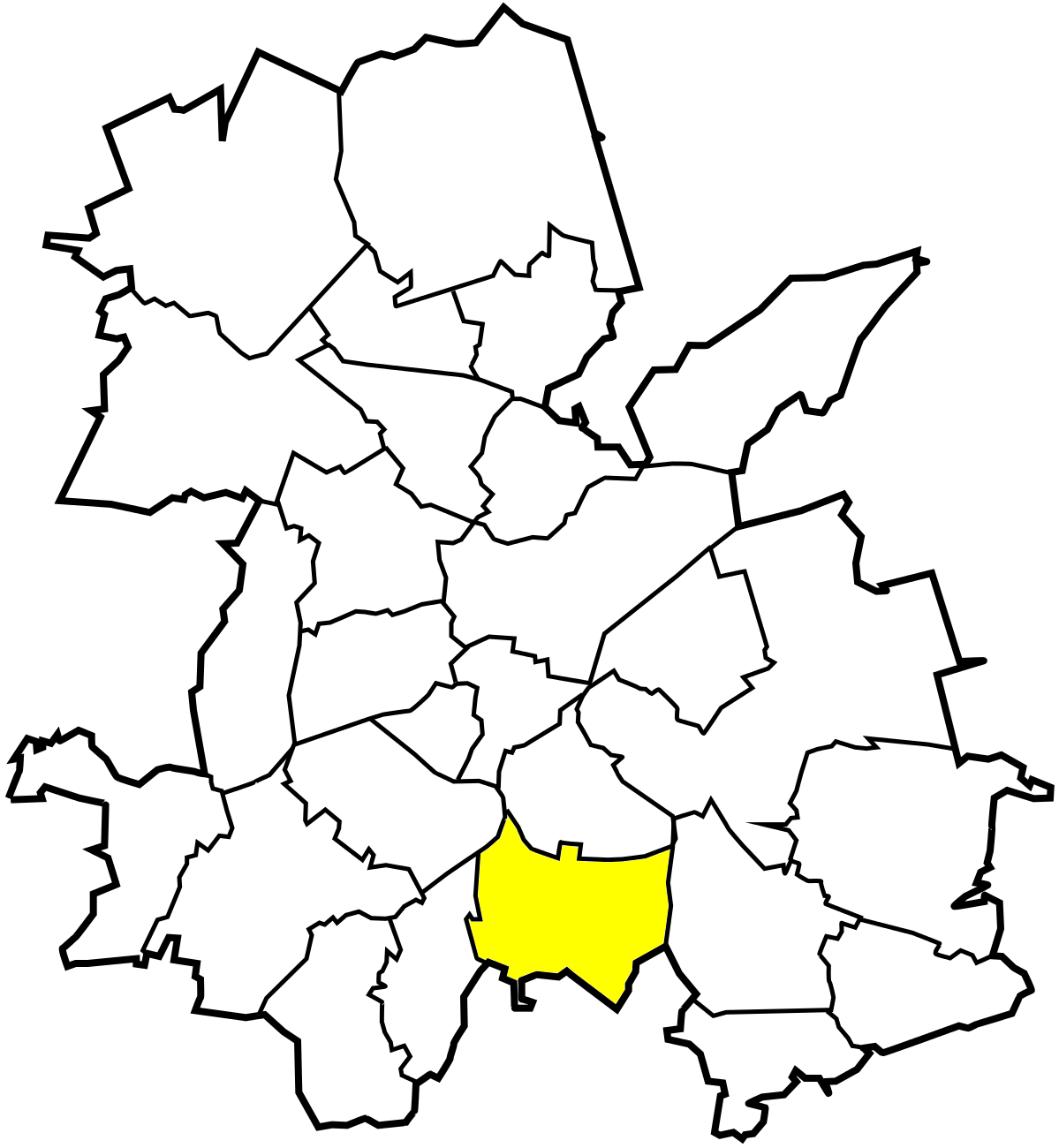
- Location of Chwałowice within Rybnik
- Coordinates: 50.065334°N 18.554854°E
- Country: Poland
- Voivodeship: Silesian
- County/City: Rybnik

Population (2013)
  - Total: 7,700
- Time zone: UTC+1 (CET)
  - Summer (DST): UTC+2 (CEST)
- Area code: (+48) 032

Chwałowice (German: Chwallowitz) is a district of Rybnik, Silesian Voivodeship, southern Poland. On December 31, 2013 it had 7,700 inhabitants.

== History ==
The village was first mentioned in 1228 as Falevich, and later in the Liber fundationis episcopatus Vratislaviensis (ca. 1305) as Quelowicz.

After World War I in the Upper Silesia plebiscite 986 out of 1,593 voters in Chwałowice voted in favour of rejoining Poland, against 607 opting for staying in Germany. In 1922 it became a part of Silesian Voivodeship, Second Polish Republic.

It was occupied and then annexed by Nazi Germany at the beginning of World War II. Two local Polish policemen were murdered by the Russians in the Katyn massacre in 1940. After the war it was restored to Poland.

In years 1945-1954 it was a seat of a gmina. On November 13, 1954 it gained the status of urban-type settlement. and on August 18, 1962 of a town. On May 27, 1975 it was amalgamated with Rybnik.

== Gallery ==
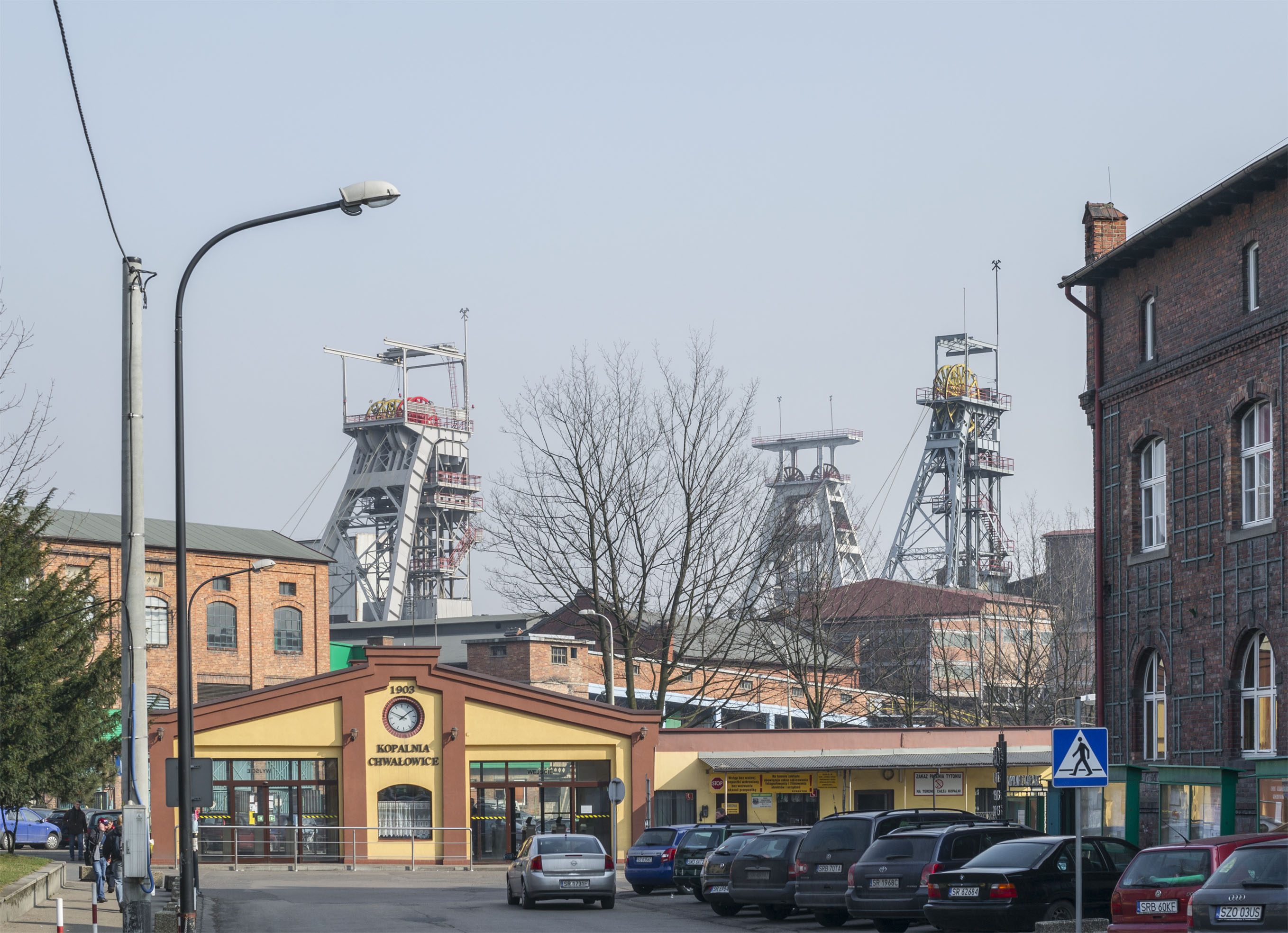
Coal mine

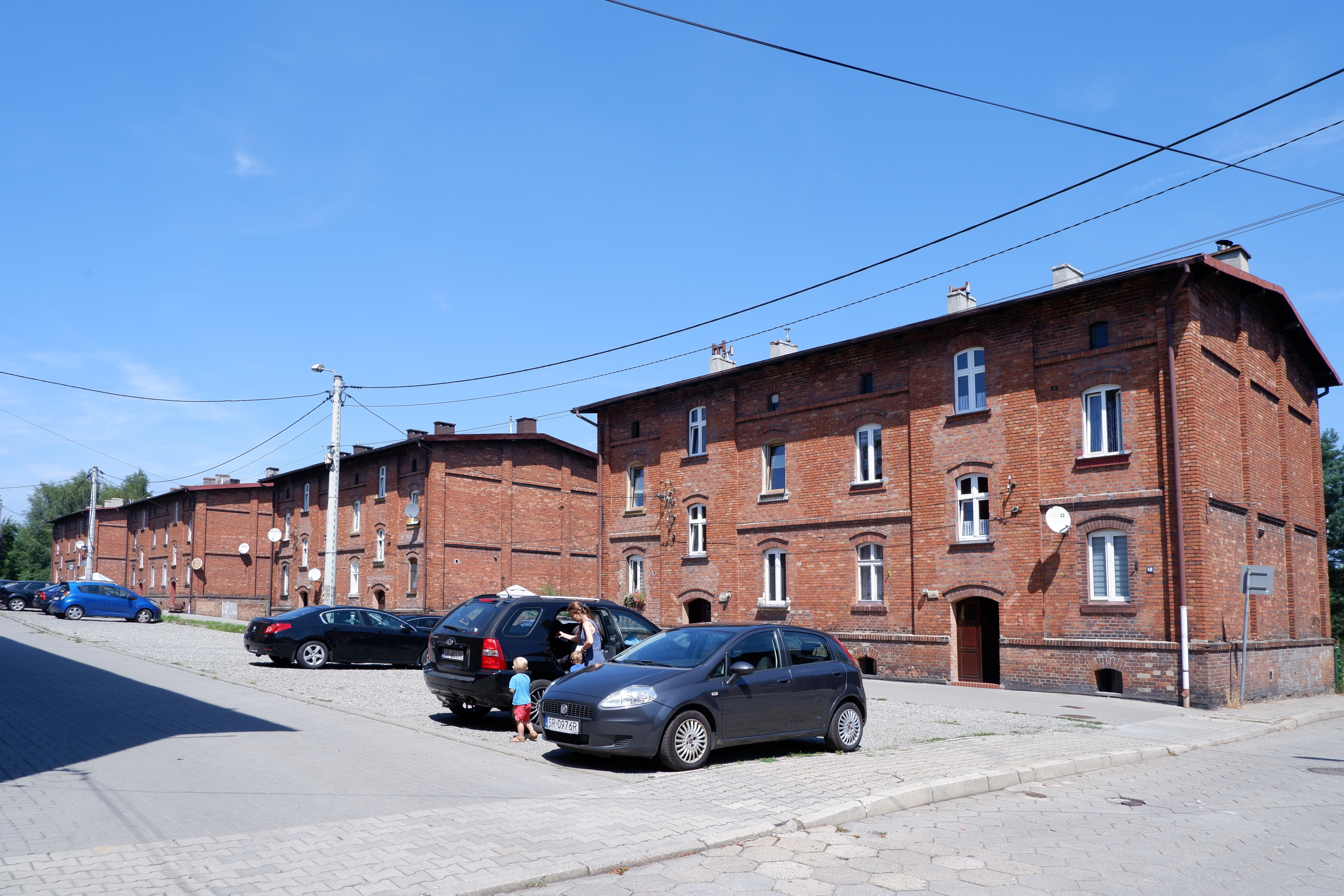
Familoks

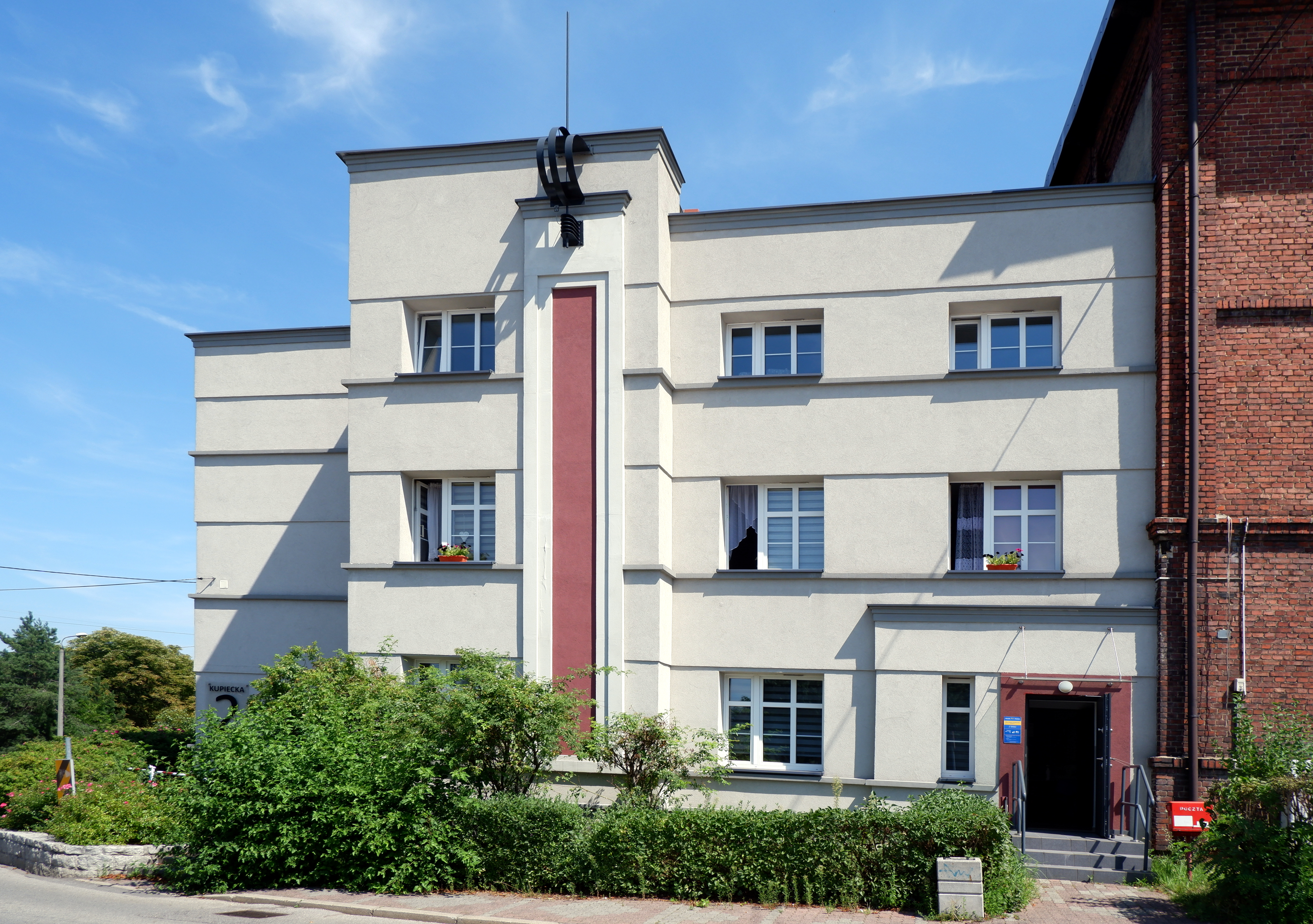
Post office

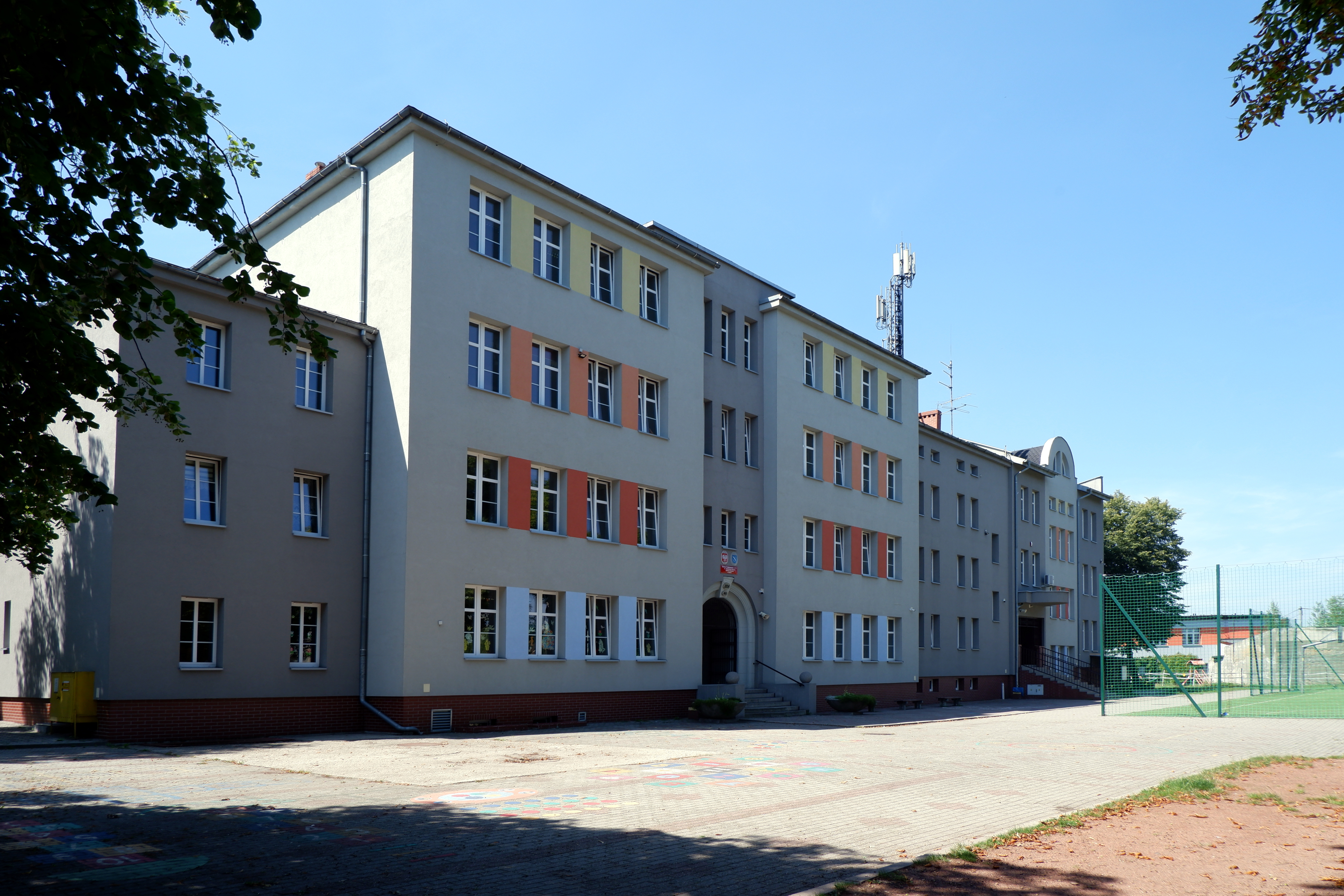
Elementary school

== See also ==
- Chwałowice Coal Mine
