= KS ROW 1964 Rybnik =

Polish football club

- Full name: Klub Sportowy Rybnickiego Okręgu Węglowego 1964 Rybnik
- Founded: 6 August 1964; 61 years ago 2003; 23 years ago (refounded as Energetyk ROW Rybnik)
- Ground: MOSiR Stadium
- Capacity: 10,304
- Chairman: Karol Kuśka
- Head coach: Jacek Trzeciak
- League: III liga, group III
- 2025–26: IV liga Silesia, 1st of 18 (promoted)
- Website: www.row1964rybnik.com
Home colours	Away colours	Alternate colours

KS ROW 1964 Rybnik is a Polish association football club based in Rybnik. The club was formed in 2003 on the basis of RKS Energetyk Rybnik (founded in 1981) and traces its roots back to ROW Rybnik's football section, founded in 1964 and dissolved in the early 1990s. Although continuing the traditions of the original club, it is considered a new entity. The club was called Energetyk ROW Rybnik between 2003 and 2015.

While KS ROW spent 7 seasons in the Ekstraklasa (1968–69, 1970–71, 1972–77), were runners-up of the 1974–75 Polish Cup and played in the Intertoto Cup (1971, 1973, 1975, 1976), Energetyk ROW's biggest success to date has been the promotion to the 2013–14 I liga, the second tier in Polish league pyramid.

== History ==
The history of football in Rybnik dates back to 1920, when a group of Polish activists, who participated in the Silesian Uprisings, formed a sports organisation in Rybnik. ROW itself was not formed until 1964, when two sports clubs, Górnik Rybnik and Górnik 23 Chwałowice, from nearby Chwałowice, merged. In its heyday (1970s), ROW Rybnik had 13 departments, including the most popular: football and speedway.

ROW Rybnik was officially created on 6 August 1964, upon the decision of local authorities. Its first manager was an influential coal magnate from Upper Silesia and chairman of Rybnik Union of Coal Industry, Jerzy Kucharczyk. ROW originally had 13 departments, including ski-jumping. Each department was financially supported by a different factory: ROW’s football team was sponsored by the Chwałowice Coal Mine.

In the 1966–67 season of Upper Silesian Third Division, ROW emerged as a winner, and was promoted to the second division. In the summer of 1968, ROW won promotion to the Ekstraklasa, finishing below Zagłębie Wałbrzych, but ahead of Zawisza Bydgoszcz and Lech Poznań. After one year, the team was relegated, to once again win promotion to the first level of Polish football, after the 1969–70 season. Once again, ROW was relegated in the summer of 1971, to return to the Ekstraklasa in mid-1972 and remain there for five years.

In the 1974–75 season, ROW managed to reach the final of the Polish Cup, beating Metal Kluczbork, Legia Warsaw, Polonia Bytom, Lech Poznań and Górnik Zabrze in the semifinal. The final game against Stal Rzeszów ended in a draw, and after penalty shootout, Stal won the Polish Cup.

ROW was relegated from the Ekstraklasa after the 1976–77 season, never to return to the top division. After several years at the second level of competition, the team was in 1983 relegated to the third division.

In the early 1990s, ROWs football team was dissolved. Among top players, who put on ROW’s jersey were Henryk Wieczorek, Piotr Mowlik, and Eugeniusz Lerch. Altogether, ROW played seven years in Ekstraklasa: 198 games, 50 victories, 65 draws, 83 losses, 165 goals scored. It played in the Intertoto Cup four times.

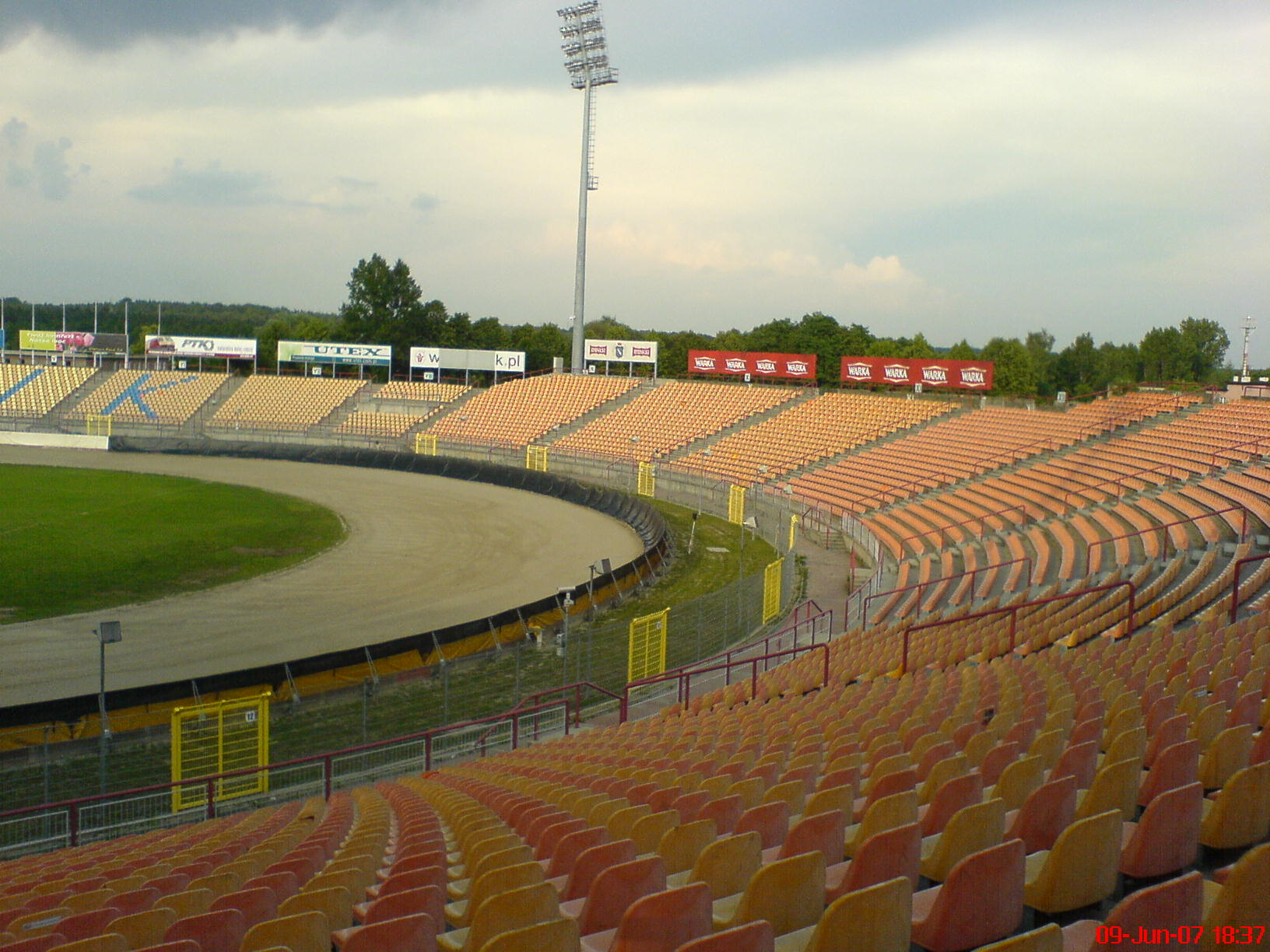
Rybnik Municipal Stadium, home venue of ROW Rybnik, in 2007

Before the 2015–16 season after a fan vote and a board change, the club returned its historical roots and renamed itself "KS ROW 1964", dropping its affiliation with "Energetyk".

== Honours ==
=== Domestic ===
- Polish Cup
  - Runners-up: 1974–75

=== European ===
- Intertoto Cup
  - Winners: 1973 (group 5), 1975 (group 6)

== European record ==
Season	Competition	Round	Country	Club	Home	Away	Aggregate/Position
1971	Intertoto Cup	Group 5	(Sweden)	Åtvidaberg	1–1	1–4	2nd
1971	Intertoto Cup	Group 5	(West Germany)	Borussia Dortmund	2–1	2–1	2nd
1971	Intertoto Cup	Group 5	(Austria)	Tirol Innsbruck	1–3	1–0	2nd
1973	Intertoto Cup	Group 5	(Sweden)	Örebro	3–1	1–2	1st
1973	Intertoto Cup	Group 5	(Switzerland)	Lugano	3–0	4–0	1st
1973	Intertoto Cup	Group 5	(Austria)	VÖEST Linz	3–1	2–2	1st
1975	Intertoto Cup	Group 6	(Netherlands)	AZ	2–2	0–0	1st
1975	Intertoto Cup	Group 6	(Sweden)	Öster	2–1	1–0	1st
1975	Intertoto Cup	Group 6	(Switzerland)	Grasshopper	1–0	2–0	1st
1976	Intertoto Cup	Group 9	(Sweden)	Djurgården	5–2	0–3	4th
1976	Intertoto Cup	Group 9	(Switzerland)	St. Gallen	2–0	1–4	4th
1976	Intertoto Cup	Group 9	(Austria)	Sturm Graz	1–3	1–2	4th

== Current squad ==
As of 26 September 2021

Note: Flags indicate national team as defined under FIFA eligibility rules; some limited exceptions apply. Players may hold more than one non-FIFA nationality.

No.	Pos.	Nation	Player
2	DF	POL	Jan Janik
3	DF	POL	Daniel Rolka
4	DF	POL	Piotr Jakubowski
5	FW	POL	Aleksander Folmert
6	DF	POL	Bartosz Kunat
8	MF	POL	Jakub Pochcioł
9	FW	POL	Łukasz Krakowczyk
10	MF	UKR	Yaroslav Baranskyi
11	MF	POL	Konrad Warmiński
12	GK	POL	Paweł Kapusta
13	MF	POL	Mateusz Cywka
14	DF	POL	Szymon Balcer

No.	Pos.	Nation	Player
15	DF	POL	Kornel Musiatowicz
16	MF	POL	Olivier Wiora
17	MF	POL	Andrzej Malik
18	FW	POL	Nikodem Juraszczyk
20	MF	POL	Michał Pieczka
22	GK	POL	Aleksander Łubik
24	MF	POL	Dominik Piekorz
27	DF	POL	Oliwer Grabczyński
64	GK	POL	Bartosz Barczyk
88	MF	POL	Adam Byzdra
97	MF	POL	Olaf Sobik
—	MF	POL	Marcin Chruszcz
