= 2005–06 Eintracht Frankfurt season =

Eintracht Frankfurt
2005–06 season
- Chairman: Heribert Bruchhagen
- Manager: Friedhelm Funkel
- Bundesliga: 14th
- DFB-Pokal: Final
- Top goalscorer: League: Ioannis Amanatidis (12); All: Ioannis Amanatidis (15)
- Highest home attendance: 50,000 on four occasions (league)
- Lowest home attendance: 26,000 on two occasions (league)
- Average home league attendance: 41,918
Home colours	Away colours	Third colours

The 2005–06 Eintracht Frankfurt season was the 106th season in the club's football history. In 2005–06 the club played in the Bundesliga, the first tier of German football. It was the club's 101st season in the first tier.

== Results ==
=== Legend ===
Win Draw Loss Postponed

=== Friendlies ===
6 July 2005	Zillertal XI	0–10	Eintracht Frankfurt	Zell am Ziller, Austria
18:00 CEST		(Report)	van Lent 13', 19'; Vasoski 29'; Meier 30'; Lexa 37'; Cha 48'; Stroh-Engel 55', 85'; Weissenberger 60'; Köhler 69'	Stadium: Parkstadion Zell/Ziller; Attendance: 500

10 July 2005	FC Augsburg	0–1	Eintracht Frankfurt	Augsburg, Germany
18:00 CEST		(Report)	Wiedener 25'	Stadium: Rosenaustadion; Attendance: 1,500

14 July 2005	Viktoria Urberach	1–12	Eintracht Frankfurt	Rödermark, Germany
18:45 CEST	Grimm 57'	(Report)	Huggel 4' van Lent 21', 28', 38'; Meier 24', 36', 44'; Köhler 40'; Preuß 59'; Lenze 63'; Weissenberger 74' (pen.); Cha 89'	Stadium: Viktoria-Sportplatz; Attendance: 3,500

17 July 2005	Eintracht Wetzlar	0–12	Eintracht Frankfurt	Wetzlar, Germany
18:30 CEST		(Report)	Weissenberger 25' (pen.); Copado 29'; Köhler 30', 77', 88'; Cha 41'; Preuß 44' van Lent 53', 55'; Lexa 65'; Meier 70' (pen.); Ochs 78'	Stadium: Stadion Wetzlar; Attendance: 3,200

20 July 2005	Eintracht Frankfurt	1–1	Beşiktaş	Kempten, Germany
19:00 CEST	van Lent 29'	(Report)	Souleymane Youla 81'	Attendance: 3,000; Referee: Fleischer

23 July 2005	Eintracht Frankfurt	1–1	Crystal Palace	Füssen, Germany
18:30 CEST	van Lent 76'	(Report)	Hudson 50'	Attendance: 1,000

24 July 2005	Allgäu XI	1–1	Eintracht Frankfurt	Oberstdorf, Germany
18:30 CEST	Wörgötter 44'	(Report)	Copado 9'	Attendance: 1,500

27 July 2005	Odenwald XI	1–6	Eintracht Frankfurt	Erbach, Germany
17:30 CEST	Leifermann 90' (pen.)	(Report)	Cha 9'; Copado 29', 85'; Chaftar 53'; Jones 66'; Cimen 73'	Stadium: Sportpark Erbach; Attendance: 2,500

30 July 2005	Eintracht Frankfurt	2–0	Karlsruher SC	Eschborn, Germany
16:00 CEST	Cha 12'; Preuß 71'	(Report)		Stadium: Heinrich-Graf Sportanlage; Attendance: 3,000; Referee: Wagner

2 August 2005	TuS Dehrn	0–21	Eintracht Frankfurt	Runkel, Germany
18:30 CEST		(Report)	Jones 7'; Copado 11' (32); Meier 16', 33' van Lent 27'; Lexa 35', 42'; Huggel 44'; Lenze 48', 73', 78'; Cha 50'; Weissenberger 51' (pen.); Köhler 58', 59', 84'; Preuß 62'; Ochs 65'; Wiedener 80'	Stadium: Sportplatz an der Lahnbrücke; Attendance: 3,000; Referee: Horn

2 September 2005	SC Paderborn	0–0	Eintracht Frankfurt	Paderborn, Germany
18:30 CEST		(Report)		Stadium: Hermann Löns Stadium; Attendance: 2,200; Referee: Guido Winkmann

6 September 2005	Rot-Weiß Walldorf	1–6	Eintracht Frankfurt	Mörfelden-Walldorf, Germany
18:30 CEST	Doukas 3'	(Report)	Copado 18'; Amanatidis 20'; Vasoski 41'; Stroh-Engel 59' van Lent 81'; Cha 87'	Stadium: Sportplatz Okrifteler Straße; Attendance: 1,800; Referee: Öztürk

7 October 2005	Jahn Regensburg	1–2	Eintracht Frankfurt	Regensburg, Germany
19:00 CEST	Alder 56' (pen.)	(Report)	Meier 24'; Husterer 76'	Stadium: Jahnstadion; Attendance: 500; Referee: Maier

9 January 2006	SC Freiburg	0–2	Eintracht Frankfurt	Albufeira, Portugal
16:00 CEST		(Report)	Cha 22'; Köhler 24'

14 May 2006	Standard Liège	1–0	Eintracht Frankfurt	Portimão, Portugal
18:30 CEST	Sarr 2'	(Report)

21 January 2006	TuS Koblenz	2–1	Eintracht Frankfurt	Neunkirchen, Germany
	Džaka 6' (pen.); Guščinas 32'	(Report)	Cha 53'	Stadium: Ellenfeldstadion; Attendance: 60

16 May 2006	TSV Heusenstamm	0–7	Eintracht Frankfurt	Heusenstamm, Germany
		(Report)	Stroh-Engel 4', 79'; Köhler 18', 22'; Copado 28'; Toski 59'; Huggel 69'	Stadium: Sportgelände Alte Linde; Attendance: 1,500

15 May 2014	SKG Stockstadt	2–9	Eintracht Frankfurt	Stockstadt, Germany
18:30 CEST	Raffa 26'; Heldmann 68'	(Report)	Pröll 37', 45', 55', 87'; Copado 49'; Huggel 50', 53'; Rehmer 77'; Copado 90'	Stadium: SKG Sportgelände; Attendance: 2,700; Referee: Schröder

20 May 2006	SG Oberhöchstadt	0–4	Eintracht Frankfurt	Kronberg im Taunus, Germany
16:00 CEST		(Report)	Pröll 11'; Rehmer 15', 18'; Weissenberger 20'; Aborted due to heavy rain after 22 minutes	Stadium: Sportplatz Altkönigstraße; Attendance: 1,400

25 May 2006	East Hesse XI	6–9	Eintracht Frankfurt	Fulda, Germany
14:00 CEST	Hammerl 19'; Göhringer 47'; Hilfenhaus 52'; Aschenbrücker 60', 81'; Romeis 86'	(Report)	Fießer 9', 49'; Puljiz 10'; Köhler 33'; Pröll 44'; Copado 57'; Nikolov 63' (pen.), 90'; Kühn 73'	Stadium: Haimbacher Sportplatz; Attendance: 1,800; Referee: Möller

=== Bundesliga ===
==== League table ====
Pos	Team	Pld	W	D	L	GF	GA	GD	Pts	Qualification or relegation
12	Hannover 96	34	7	17	10	43	47	−4	38	
13	Arminia Bielefeld	34	10	7	17	32	47	−15	37	
14	Eintracht Frankfurt	34	9	9	16	42	51	−9	36	Qualification to UEFA Cup first round (Note: As DFB Cup 2005-06 winners Bayern Munich qualified for the 2006–07 UEFA Champions League, the 2006–07 UEFA Cup place for domestic cup winners was awarded to finalists Eintracht Frankfurt.)
15	VfL Wolfsburg	34	7	13	14	33	55	−22	34	
16	1. FC Kaiserslautern (R)	34	8	9	17	47	71	−24	33	Relegation to 2. Bundesliga

Source: kicker.de
Rules for classification: 1) points; 2) goal difference; 3) number of goals scored.
(R) Relegated

==== Results by round ====
Round	1	2	3	4	5	6	7	8	9	10	11	12	13	14	15	16	17	18	19	20	21	22	23	24	25	26	27	28	29	30	31	32	33	34
Ground	H	A	H	A	A	H	A	H	A	H	A	H	A	H	A	H	A	A	H	A	H	H	A	H	A	H	A	H	A	H	A	H	A	H
Result	L	L	W	L	D	L	L	L	W	W	L	W	D	D	W	W	L	L	D	W	L	L	L	D	L	W	D	L	L	D	W	D	D	L
Position	16	18	12	15	15	15	17	18	16	13	14	12	12	13	10	9	10	11	11	11	11	11	12	12	14	13	13	13	13	13	13	13	14	14

Source: kicker.de
A = Away; H = Home; W = Win; D = Draw; L = Loss

==== Matches ====
7 August 2005 1	Eintracht Frankfurt	1–4	Bayer Leverkusen	Frankfurt, Germany
17:30 CEST	Vasoski 7'	(Report)	Berbatov 24'; Voronin 48'; Schneider 56'; Krzynówek 59'	Stadium: Waldstadion; Attendance: 42,000; Referee: Florian Meyer

13 August 2005 2	Hertha BSC	2–0	Eintracht Frankfurt	Berlin, Germany
15:30 CEST	Schröder 53' van Lent 78' (o.g.)	(Report)		Stadium: Olympiastadion; Attendance: 45,000; Referee: Markus Schmidt

27 August 2005 3	Eintracht Frankfurt	1–0	1. FC Nürnberg	Frankfurt, Germany
15:30 CEST	Jones 68'	(Report)		Stadium: Waldstadion; Attendance: 40,000; Referee: Manuel Gräfe

10 September 2005 4	Hannover 96	2–0	Eintracht Frankfurt	Hanover, Germany
15:30 CEST	Štajner 32'; Yankov 63'	(Report)		Stadium: Niedersachsenstadion; Attendance: 40,000; Referee: Markus Merk

17 September 2005 5	Hamburger SV	1–1	Eintracht Frankfurt	Hamburg, Germany
15:30 CEST	Van Buyten 85'	(Report)	Cha 90'	Stadium: Volksparkstadion; Attendance: 48,500; Referee: Thorsten Kinhöfer

20 September 2005 6	Eintracht Frankfurt	0–1	Bayern Munich	Frankfurt, Germany
20:00 CEST		(Report)	Guerrero 72'	Stadium: Waldstadion; Attendance: 50,000; Referee: Knut Kircher

24 September 2005 7	VfL Wolfsburg	1–0	Eintracht Frankfurt	Wolfsburg, Germany
15:30 CEST	Klimowicz 35'	(Report)		Stadium: Volkswagen Arena; Attendance: 17,000; Referee: Drees

1 October 2005 8	Eintracht Frankfurt	0–1	Schalke 04	Frankfurt, Germany
15:30 CEST		(Report)	Larsen 64'	Stadium: Waldstadion; Attendance: 50,000; Referee: Wolfgang Stark

16 October 2005 9	MSV Duisburg	0–1	Eintracht Frankfurt	Duisburg, Germany
17:30 CEST		(Report)	Meier 26'	Stadium: MSV-Arena; Attendance: 24,500; Referee: Markus Schmidt

22 October 2005 10	Eintracht Frankfurt	6–3	1. FC Köln	Frankfurt, Germany
15:30 CEST	Amanatidis 2'; Rehmer 8'; Chris 28'; Köhler 35'; Meier 78'; Cha 89'	(Report)	Streit 5'; Podolski 54' (pen.); Alpay 90'	Stadium: Waldstadion; Attendance: 48,000; Referee: Herbert Fandel

29 October 2005 11	Werder Bremen	4–1	Eintracht Frankfurt	Bremen, Germany
15:30 CEST	Frings 29'; Borowski 52', 90'; Klose 61'	(Report)	Amanatidis 19'	Stadium: Weserstadion; Attendance: 41,000; Referee: Knut Kircher

5 November 2005 12	Eintracht Frankfurt	3–0	Arminia Bielefeld	Frankfurt, Germany
15:30 CEST	Copado 35'; Meier 49', 55'	(Report)		Stadium: Waldstadion; Attendance: 33,500; Referee: Michael Weiner

19 November 2005 13	Mainz 05	2–2	Eintracht Frankfurt	Mainz, Germany
15:30 CEST	Noveski 70'; Ruman 90'	(Report)	Noveski 3' (o.g.), 6' (o.g.)	Stadium: Stadion am Bruchweg; Attendance: 20,500; Referee: Wolfgang Stark

27 November 2005 14	Eintracht Frankfurt	1–1	VfB Stuttgart	Frankfurt, Germany
17:30 CEST	Amanatidis 19'	(Report)	Ljuboja 63'	Stadium: Waldstadion; Attendance: 41,500; Referee: Babak Rafati

10 December 2005 16	Eintracht Frankfurt	2–0	Borussia Dortmund	Frankfurt, Germany
15:30 CEST	Copado 9'; Amanatidis 84'	(Report)	Rosický (yellow card) 73' (yellow-red card)	Stadium: Waldstadion; Attendance: 48,000; Referee: Peter Gagelmann

14 December 2005 15	1. FC Kaiserslautern	1–2	Eintracht Frankfurt	Kaiserslautern, Germany
17:30 CEST	Seitz 85'	(Report)	Weissenberger 50'; Copado 58'	Stadium: Fritz-Walter-Stadion; Attendance: 34,000; Referee: Florian Meyer

17 December 2005 17	Borussia Mönchengladbach	4–3	Eintracht Frankfurt	Mönchengladbach, Germany
15:30 CEST	Jansen 45'; Neuville 77', 82'; Svěrkoš 88'	(Report)	Copado 16', 21'; Chris 90'	Stadium: Borussia-Park; Attendance: 47,500; Referee: Markus Merk

28 January 2006 18	Bayer Leverkusen	2–1	Eintracht Frankfurt	Leverkusen, Germany
18:30 CEST	Freier 67'; Butt 74' (pen.)	(Report)	Ioannis Amanatidis 42'	Stadium: BayArena; Attendance: 22,500; Referee: Herbert Fandel

4 February 2006 19	Eintracht Frankfurt	1–1	Hertha BSC	Frankfurt, Germany
15:30 CEST	Jones 59'	(Report)	Boateng 20'	Stadium: Waldstadion; Attendance: 30,000; Referee: Michael Weiner

8 February 2006 20	1. FC Nürnberg	0–1	Eintracht Frankfurt	Nuremberg, Germany
20:00 CEST		(Report)	Amanatidis 44'	Stadium: Frankenstadion; Attendance: 22,500; Referee: Markus Merk

11 February 2006 21	Eintracht Frankfurt	0–1	Hannover 96	Frankfurt, Germany
15:30 CEST		(Report)	Yankov 78'	Stadium: Waldstadion; Attendance: 26,000; Referee: Markus Schmidt

19 February 2006 22	Eintracht Frankfurt	1–2	Hamburger SV	Frankfurt, Germany
17:30 CEST	Meier 42'	(Report)	Trochowski 20'; Van Buyten 52'	Stadium: Waldstadion; Attendance: 47,500; Referee: Fleischer

25 February 2006 23	Bayern Munich	5–2	Eintracht Frankfurt	Munich, Germany
15:30 CEST	Guerrero 21', 42'; Ballack 32', 62'; Pizarro 85'	(Report)	Preuß 31'; Meier 84'	Stadium: Allianz Arena; Attendance: 69,000; Referee: Peter Gagelmann

5 March 2006 24	Eintracht Frankfurt	1–1	VfL Wolfsburg	Frankfurt, Germany
15:30 CEST	Amanatidis 65'	(Report)	Hanke 58'	Stadium: Waldstadion; Attendance: 26,000; Referee: Thorsten Kinhöfer

12 March 2006 25	Schalke 04	2–0	Eintracht Frankfurt	Gelsenkirchen, Germany
17:30 CEST	Larsen 52'; Sand 90'	(Report)		Stadium: Veltins-Arena; Attendance: 61,500; Referee: Knut Kircher

18 March 2006 26	Eintracht Frankfurt	5–2	MSV Duisburg	Frankfurt, Germany
15:30 CEST	Amanatidis 1', 13', 57'; Köhler 11'; Copado 79' (pen.)	(Report)	Bodzek 25'; Lavrič 32'	Stadium: Waldstadion; Attendance: 32,000; Referee: Markus Merk

25 March 2006 27	1. FC Köln	1–1	Eintracht Frankfurt	Cologne, Germany
20:00 CEST	Springer 2'; Szabics (red card) 45'	(Report)	Rehmer 16'	Stadium: RheinEnergieStadion; Attendance: 48,000; Referee: Florian Meyer

1 April 2006 28	Eintracht Frankfurt	0–1	Werder Bremen	Frankfurt, Germany
15:30 CEST		(Report)	Klose 70' (pen.)	Stadium: Waldstadion; Attendance: 48,600; Referee: Herbert Fandel

8 April 2006 29	Arminia Bielefeld	1–0	Eintracht Frankfurt	Bielefeld, Germany
15:30 CEST	Westermann 68'	(Report)		Stadium: Bielefelder Alm; Attendance: 23,000; Referee: Peter Gagelmann

15 April 2006 30	Eintracht Frankfurt	0–0	Mainz 05	Frankfurt, Germany
15:30 CEST		(Report)		Stadium: Waldstadion; Attendance: 50,000; Referee: Knut Kircher

22 April 2006 31	VfB Stuttgart	0–2	Eintracht Frankfurt	Stuttgart, Germany
15:30 CEST		(Report)	Meier 59'; Amanatidis 61' (pen.)	Stadium: Gottlieb-Daimler-Stadion; Attendance: 56,000; Referee: Wolfgang Stark

3 May 2006 32	Eintracht Frankfurt	2–2	1. FC Kaiserslautern	Frankfurt, Germany
15:30 CEST	Köhler 50'; Amanatidis 70'	(Report)	Reinert 17'; Ziemer 83'	Stadium: Waldstadion; Attendance: 50,000; Referee: Thorsten Kinhöfer

6 May 2006 33	Borussia Dortmund	1–1	Eintracht Frankfurt	Dortmund, Germany
15:30 CEST	Gambino 87'	(Report)	Cha 54'	Stadium: Westfalenstadion; Attendance: 80,000; Referee: Florian Meyer

13 May 2006 34	Eintracht Frankfurt	0–2	Borussia Mönchengladbach	Frankfurt, Germany
15:30 CEST		(Report)	Neuville 56'; Rafael 90'	Stadium: Waldstadion; Attendance: 49,500; Referee: Fleischer

=== DFB-Pokal ===
19 August 2005 First round	Rot-Weiß Oberhausen	1–2	Eintracht Frankfurt	Oberhausen, Germany
19:00 CEST	Gatarić 77'	(Report)	Huggel 36'; Amanatidis 52'	Stadium: Niederrheinstadion; Attendance: 3,800; Referee: Kuhl

25 October 2005 Second round	Eintracht Frankfurt	6–0	Schalke 04	Frankfurt, Germany
19:30 CEST	Meier 28', 68'; Huggel 30'; Spycher 64'; Copado 79'; Ochs 85'	(Report)		Stadium: Waldstadion; Attendance: 33,000; Referee: Felix Brych

21 December 2005 Third round	Eintracht Frankfurt	1–1 (a.e.t.) (4–1 p)	1. FC Nürnberg	Frankfurt, Germany
19:00 CEST	Copado 35' (pen.); Spycher (red card) 98'	(Report)	Kießling 43'	Stadium: Waldstadion; Attendance: 39,000; Referee: Herbert Fandel
	Penalties
	(penalty scored) Köhler; (penalty scored) Copado; (penalty scored) Preuß; (penalty scored) Huggel		(penalty missed) Pinola; (penalty missed) Saenko; (penalty scored) Banović

25 January 2006 Quarterfinals	TSV 1860 München	1–3	Eintracht Frankfurt	Munich, Germany
19:00 CEST	Reisinger 11'	(Report)	Copado 21'; Amanatidis 77'; Meier 90'	Stadium: Allianz Arena; Attendance: 25,000; Referee: Thorsten Kinhöfer

11 April 2006 Semifinals	Eintracht Frankfurt	1–0	Arminia Bielefeld	Frankfurt, Germany
20:30 CEST	Amanatidis 16'	(Report)		Stadium: Waldstadion; Attendance: 50,000; Referee: Markus Merk

==== Final ====
29 April 2006
20:00 CEST

Eintracht Frankfurt	0–1	Bayern Munich
	Report	Pizarro 59'

Olympiastadion, Berlin
Attendance: 74,349
Referee: Herbert Fandel (Kyllburg)

=== Indoor soccer tournaments ===
==== Rheinland Cup ====
2 January 2006 1st Match	Fortuna Düsseldorf	2–5	Eintracht Frankfurt	Cologne, Germany
	Abelski 5'; Feinbier 15'	(Report)	Preuß 1', 17'; Köhler 2'; Stroh-Engel 8', 12'	Stadium: Kölnarena; Attendance: 15,000

2 January 2006 2nd Match	1. FC Köln	1–1	Eintracht Frankfurt	Cologne, Germany
	Lell 6'	(Report)	Chris 16'	Stadium: Kölnarena; Attendance: 15,000

2 January 2006 Semi-final	MSV Duisburg	1–4	Eintracht Frankfurt	Cologne, Germany
	Rademacher 5'	(Report)	Köhler 1'; Stroh-Engel 2', 12', 19'	Stadium: Kölnarena; Attendance: 15,000

2 January 2006 Final	Alemannia Aachen	1–3	Eintracht Frankfurt	Cologne, Germany
	Rauw 11'	(Report)	Russ 7'; Huggel 8', 13'	Stadium: Kölnarena; Attendance: 15,000

==== Cup der Öffentlichen Versicherungen ====
4 January 2006 1st Match	Arminia Bielefeld	1–1	Eintracht Frankfurt	Oldenburg, Germany
	Rau 7'	(Report)	Stroh-Engel 1'	Stadium: Weser-Ems-Halle; Attendance: 4,500

4 January 2006 2nd Match	VfL Wolfsburg	0–2	Eintracht Frankfurt	Oldenburg, Germany
		(Report)	Cha 3'; Preuß 16'	Stadium: Weser-Ems-Halle; Attendance: 4,500

4 January 2006 Semi-final	VfL Oldenburg	2–4	Eintracht Frankfurt	Oldenburg, Germany
	12'; Epp 18'	(Report)	van Lent 8', 20'; Köhler 12'; Cha (13.) 13'	Stadium: Weser-Ems-Halle; Attendance: 4,500

4 January 2006 Final	Arminia Bielefeld	1–4	Eintracht Frankfurt	Oldenburg, Germany
	Christian Wieczorek (8.)	(Report)	Daniyel Cimen (6.), 1:1, 2:1 Arie van Lent (21.), 3:1 Du-Ri Cha (23.), 4:1 Dominik Stroh-Engel (24.)	Stadium: Weser-Ems-Halle; Attendance: 4,500

==== Frankfurt Cup ====
5 January 2006 1st Match	Eintracht Frankfurt	2–2	Kickers Offenbach	Frankfurt, Germany
	Frommer; Russ 20'	(Report)	Goal	Stadium: Fraport Arena; Attendance: 5,000

5 January 2006 2nd Match	Eintracht Frankfurt	1–1	Sportfreunde Siegen	Frankfurt, Germany
	Huggel 17'	(Report)	Goal	Stadium: Fraport Arena; Attendance: 5,000

5 January 2006 Semi-final	Eintracht Frankfurt	1–1 (4–3 p)	LR Ahlen	Frankfurt, Germany
	Huggel 18'	(Report)	Goal	Stadium: Fraport Arena; Attendance: 5,000

5 January 2006 Final	Eintracht Frankfurt	2–2 (1–3 p)	Sportfreunde Siegen	Frankfurt, Germany
	Russ; Köhler	(Report)	Goal	Stadium: Fraport Arena; Attendance: 5,000

== Players ==
=== First-team squad ===
Squad at end of season

Note: Flags indicate national team as defined under FIFA eligibility rules; some limited exceptions apply. Players may hold more than one non-FIFA nationality.

No.	Pos.	Nation	Player
1	GK	(North Macedonia) MKD	Oka Nikolov (Note: Nikolov was born in Erbach im Odenwald, West Germany (now Germany), but also qualified to represent Macedonia (now North Macedonia) internationally and made his international debut for Macedonia in September 1998.)
2	DF	(Germany) GER	Patrick Ochs
4	DF	(Germany) GER	Christoph Preuß
5	DF	(North Macedonia) MKD	Aleksandar Vasoski
7	MF	(Germany) GER	Benjamin Köhler
8	MF	(Austria) AUT	Stefan Lexa
10	MF	(Austria) AUT	Markus Weissenberger
11	MF	(South Korea) KOR	Cha Du-ri (Note: Cha was born in Frankfurt, West Germany (now Germany), but also qualified to represent South Korea internationally through his father and made his debut for South Korea in 2001.)
13	MF	(Germany) GER	Jermaine Jones (Note: Jones was born in Frankfurt, West Germany (now Germany), and represented Germany at U-20, U-21 and B level before making his international debut for Germany in 2008, but also qualified to represent the United States through his father and made his international debut for the United States in October 2010.)
14	MF	(Germany) GER	Alexander Meier
15	DF	(Croatia) CRO	Jurica Puljiz
16	DF	(Switzerland) SUI	Christoph Spycher
17	MF	(Germany) GER	Daniyel Cimen

No.	Pos.	Nation	Player
18	FW	(Greece) GRE	Ioannis Amanatidis
20	FW	(Germany) GER	Francisco Copado
21	GK	(Germany) GER	Markus Pröll
22	DF	(Germany) GER	Christopher Reinhard
23	DF	(Germany) GER	Marco Russ
24	MF	(Germany) GER	Alexander Schur
26	FW	(Germany) GER	Dominik Stroh-Engel
28	GK	(Germany) GER	Jan Zimmermann
29	DF	(Brazil) BRA	Chris
30	MF	(Switzerland) SUI	Benjamin Huggel
31	DF	(Germany) GER	Mounir Chaftar
33	DF	(Germany) GER	Marko Rehmer
34	GK	(Germany) GER	Robert Cue

=== Left club during season ===
Note: Flags indicate national team as defined under FIFA eligibility rules; some limited exceptions apply. Players may hold more than one non-FIFA nationality.

No.	Pos.	Nation	Player
3	DF	(Germany) GER	Andree Wiedener (retired)
6	MF	(Germany) GER	Christian Lenze (to Erzgebirge Aue)
9	FW	(Netherlands) NED	Arie van Lent (to Rot-Weiss Essen)

No.	Pos.	Nation	Player
12	DF	(Germany) GER	Markus Husterer (on loan from Bayern Munich II)
25	DF	(Germany) GER	Alexander Huber (Note: Huber was born in Leninabad, Tajik SSR, Soviet Union (now Khujand, Tajikistan), but was raised in Germany from the age of 4 and represented Germany at U-20 and B level before making his international debut for Tajikistan in June 2017.) (on loan to 1899 Hoffenheim)
26	FW	(Germany) GER	Nico Frommer (to Unterhaching)

=== Eintracht Frankfurt II ===
Note: Flags indicate national team as defined under FIFA eligibility rules; some limited exceptions apply. Players may hold more than one non-FIFA nationality.

No.	Pos.	Nation	Player
—	GK	(Germany) GER	Pablo Álvarez
—	GK	(Germany) GER	Nils Holzhauser
—	DF	(Germany) GER	Timothy Chandler (Note: Chandler was born in Frankfurt, West Germany (now Germany), but also qualified to represent the United States internationally through his father and made his international debut for the United States in March 2011.)
—	DF	(Germany) GER	Sebastian Jung
—	MF	(Germany) GER	Marcel Titsch-Rivero

No.	Pos.	Nation	Player
—	MF	(Germany) GER	Faton Toski (Note: Toski was born in Gjilan, SFR Yugoslavia (now Kosovo), but was raised in Germany and represented Germany at U-19 level before making his international debut for Kosovo in March 2014.)
—	MF	(Germany) GER	Richard Weil
—	MF	(Croatia) CRO	Krešo Ljubičić (Note: Ljubičić was born in Hanau, West Germany (now Germany), but also qualified to represent Croatia internationally and represented Croatia at U-17, U-18, U-19, U-20 and U-21 level.)
—	FW	(Germany) GER	Cenk Tosun (Note: Tosun was born in Wetzlar, Germany, and represented Germany at U-16, U-18, U-19 and U-21 level, but also qualified to represent Turkey internationally and represented Turkey at U-21 and B level before making his international debut for Turkey in October 2013.)

== Statistics ==
=== Appearances and goals ===
No.	Pos	Nat	Player	Total		Bundesliga		DFB-Pokal	
No.	Pos	Nat	Player	Apps	Goals	Apps	Goals	Apps	Goals
1	GK	(North Macedonia) MKD	Oka Nikolov	36	0	30	0	6	0
2	DF	(Germany) GER	Patrick Ochs	32	1	28	0	4	1
3	DF	(Germany) GER	Andree Wiedener	4	0	1	0	3	0
4	MF	(Germany) GER	Christoph Preuß	27	1	23	1	4	0
5	DF	(North Macedonia) MKD	Aleksandar Vasoski	39	1	33	1	6	0
7	MF	(Germany) GER	Benjamin Köhler	34	3	29	3	5	0
8	MF	(Austria) AUT	Stefan Lexa	16	0	13	0	3	0
9	FW	(Netherlands) NED	Arie van Lent	12	0	11	0	1	0
10	MF	(Austria) AUT	Markus Weissenberger	19	1	14	1	5	0
11	MF	(South Korea) KOR	Du-Ri Cha	30	3	27	3	3	0
13	MF	(United States) USA	Jermaine Jones	24	2	20	2	4	0
14	MF	(Germany) GER	Alexander Meier	38	10	33	7	5	3
16	DF	(Switzerland) SUI	Christoph Spycher	27	1	24	0	3	1
17	MF	(Germany) GER	Daniyel Cimen	15	0	12	0	3	0
18	FW	(Greece) GRE	Ioannis Amanatidis	37	15	32	12	5	3
20	MF	(Spain) ESP	Francisco Copado	29	9	24	6	5	3
21	GK	(Germany) GER	Markus Pröll	2	0	2	0	0	0
22	DF	(Germany) GER	Christopher Reinhard	7	0	7	0	0	0
23	DF	(Germany) GER	Marco Russ	11	0	9	0	2	0
24	MF	(Germany) GER	Alexander Schur	2	0	2	0	0	0
26	DF	(Germany) GER	Dominik Stroh-Engel	3	0	3	0	0	0
28	GK	(Germany) GER	Jan Zimmermann	2	0	2	0	0	0
29	DF	(Brazil) BRA	Chris	26	2	22	2	4	0
30	MF	(Switzerland) SUI	Benjamin Huggel	34	2	28	0	6	2
31	DF	(Germany) GER	Mounir Chaftar	1	0	1	0	0	0
33	DF	(Germany) GER	Marko Rehmer	28	2	25	2	3	0

=== Transfers ===
==== Transferred in ====
No.	Pos.	Name	Age	EU	Moving from	Type	Transfer Window	Contract ends	Transfer fee	Sources
4	Midfield	Christoph Preuß	23	Yes	VfL Bochum	Transfer	Summer	30 June 2009	€500,000	
11	Midfield	Du-Ri Cha	24	No	Bayer Leverkusen (Cha was previously loaned from Leverkusen to Eintracht)	Free transfer	Summer	30 June 2006	Free	
13	Midfield	Jermaine Jones	23	Yes	Bayer Leverkusen (Jones was previously loaned from Leverkusen to Eintracht)	Free transfer	Summer	30 June 2007	Free	
14	Midfield	Alexander Meier	22	Yes	Hamburger SV (Meier was previously loaned from Hamburg to Eintracht)	Transfer	Summer	30 June 2008	€650,000	
16	Defender	Christoph Spycher	27	No	Grasshopper Club Zürich	Transfer	Summer	30 June 2007	€275,000	
18	Striker	Ioannis Amanatidis	23	Yes	1. FC Kaiserslautern	Transfer	Summer	30 June 2008	€1.8 Million	
20	Midfield	Francisco Copado	30	Yes	SpVgg Unterhaching	Free transfer	Summer	30 June 2008	Free	
26	Striker	Dominik Stroh-Engel	19	Yes	SC Waldgirmes	Free transfer	Summer	30 June 2008	Free	
27	Striker	Nico Frommer	27	Yes	Rot-Weiß Oberhausen	Loan return	Summer	30 June 2006	Free	
28	Goalkeeper	Jan Zimmermann	20	Yes	Eintracht Frankfurt II	Promoted	Summer	30 June 2014	Free	
30	Midfield	Benjamin Huggel	27	No	FC Basel	Transfer	Summer	30 June 2008	€800,000	
31	Defender	Mounir Chaftar	19	Yes	Eintracht Frankfurt U19	Promoted	Summer	30 June 2008	Free	
33	Defender	Marko Rehmer	33	Yes	Hertha BSC	Free transfer	Summer	30 June 2006	Free	

==== Transferred out ====
No.	Pos.	Name	Age	EU	Moving to	Type	Transfer Window	Transfer fee	Sources
3	Defender	Andree Wiedener	35	Yes	Retired	Termination of contract	Winter	Free	
4	Defender	Torben Hoffmann	30	Yes	TSV 1860 München	Free transfer	Summer	Free	
5	Defender	Jens Keller	34	Yes	Retired	End of contract	Summer	Free	
6	Midfielder	Christian Lenze	28	Yes	Erzgebirge Aue	Free transfer	Summer	Free	
9	Striker	Arie van Lent	35	Yes	Rot-Weiss Essen	Free transfer	Winter	Free	
12	Defender	Markus Husterer	22	Yes	Bayern Munich II	Loan end	Winter	Free	
18	Striker	Nico Frommer	27	Yes	SpVgg Unterhaching	Free transfer	Summer	Free	
19	Midfielder	Mehmet Dragusha	27	No	SC Paderborn	Free transfer	Summer	Free	
20	Striker	Markus Beierle	33	Yes	SV Darmstadt 98	Free transfer	Summer	Free	
25	Defender	Alexander Huber	20	Yes	TSG Hoffenheim	Loan	Winter	Free	
30	Goalkeeper	Andreas Menger	32	Yes	Retired	End of contract	Summer	Free	

== Sources ==
- Matheja, Ulrich (2011). Unsere Eintracht - Eintracht Frankfurt - Die Chronik. Die Werkstatt. ISBN 978-3-89533-750-5.
