= 2006 DFB-Pokal final =

- Match programme cover
- Event: 2005–06 DFB-Pokal
Eintracht Frankfurt	Bayern Munich
0	1
- Date: 29 April 2006
- Venue: Olympiastadion, Berlin
- Referee: Herbert Fandel (Kyllburg)
- Attendance: 74,349
- Weather: Light rain 6 °C (43 °F); 93% humidity

The 2006 DFB-Pokal final decided the winner of the 2005–06 DFB-Pokal, the 63rd season of Germany's premier knockout football cup competition. It was played on 29 April 2006 at the Olympiastadion in Berlin. Bayern Munich won the match 1–0 against Eintracht Frankfurt via a goal from Claudio Pizarro, giving them their 13th cup title.

== Route to the final ==
The DFB-Pokal began with 64 teams in a single-elimination knockout cup competition. There were a total of five rounds leading up to the final. Teams were drawn against each other, and the winner after 90 minutes would advance. If still tied, 30 minutes of extra time was played. If the score was still level, a penalty shoot-out was used to determine the winner.

Note: In all results below, the score of the finalist is given first (H: home; A: away).

Eintracht Frankfurt		Round	Bayern Munich	
Opponent	Result	2005–06 DFB-Pokal	Opponent	Result
Rot-Weiß Oberhausen (A)	2–1	First round	MSV Neuruppin (A)	4–0
Schalke 04 (H)	6–0	Second round	Erzgebirge Aue (A)	1–0
1. FC Nürnberg (H)	1–1 (a.e.t.) (4–1 p)	Round of 16	Hamburger SV (H)	1–0 (a.e.t.)
1860 Munich (A)	3–1	Quarter-finals	Mainz 05 (H)	3–2 (a.e.t.)
Arminia Bielefeld (H)	1–0	Semi-finals	FC St. Pauli (A)	3–0

== Match ==
=== Details ===
29 April 2006
20:00 CEST

Eintracht Frankfurt	0–1	Bayern Munich
	Report	Pizarro 59'

Olympiastadion, Berlin
Attendance: 74,349
Referee: Herbert Fandel (Kyllburg)

Eintracht Frankfurt	Bayern Munich

GK	1	(North Macedonia) Oka Nikolov (c)
CB	33	(Germany) Marko Rehmer		(substituted off) 34'
CB	23	(Germany) Marco Russ
CB	5	(North Macedonia) Aleksandar Vasoski	(yellow card) 40'
RWB	2	(Germany) Patrick Ochs
LWB	16	(Switzerland) Christoph Spycher
DM	30	(Switzerland) Benjamin Huggel
RM	8	(Austria) Stefan Lexa		(substituted off) 72'
CM	14	(Germany) Alexander Meier
LM	7	(Germany) Benjamin Köhler
CF	18	(Greece) Ioannis Amanatidis
Substitutes:
GK	21	(Germany) Markus Pröll
DF	22	(Germany) Christopher Reinhard
MF	10	(Austria) Markus Weissenberger		(substituted on) 82'
MF	11	(South Korea) Cha Du-ri
MF	17	(Germany) Daniyel Cimen		(substituted on) 34' (substituted off) 82'
MF	24	(Germany) Alexander Schur
FW	20	(Spain) Francisco Copado		(substituted on) 72'
Manager:
(Germany) Friedhelm Funkel (Note: Friedhelm Funkel was expelled by the referee in the 66th minute.)

GK	1	(Germany) Oliver Kahn (c)
RB	2	(France) Willy Sagnol	(yellow card) 86'
CB	3	(Brazil) Lúcio
CB	25	(France) Valérien Ismaël
LB	21	(Germany) Philipp Lahm	(yellow card) 77'
DM	6	(Argentina) Martín Demichelis
RM	20	(Bosnia and Herzegovina) Hasan Salihamidžić		(substituted off) 46'
CM	13	(Germany) Michael Ballack	(yellow card) 18'
LM	23	(England) Owen Hargreaves		(substituted off) 81'
CF	10	(Netherlands) Roy Makaay		(substituted off) 90+1'
CF	14	(Peru) Claudio Pizarro
Substitutes:
GK	22	(Germany) Michael Rensing
DF	69	(France) Bixente Lizarazu
MF	7	(Germany) Mehmet Scholl		(substituted on) 90+1'
MF	11	(Brazil) Zé Roberto		(substituted on) 46'
MF	16	(Germany) Jens Jeremies		(substituted on) 81'
MF	31	(Germany) Bastian Schweinsteiger
FW	33	(Peru) Paolo Guerrero
Manager:
(Germany) Felix Magath

Assistant referees:
Mike Pickel (Mendig)
Volker Wezel (Tübingen)
Fourth official:
Jochen Drees (Mainz)

Match rules

- 90 minutes.
- 30 minutes of extra time if necessary.
- Penalty shoot-out if scores still level.
- Seven named substitutes, of which up to three may be used.
