= 2010–11 Eintracht Frankfurt season =

Eintracht Frankfurt
2010–11 season
- Chairman: Heribert Bruchhagen
- Manager: Michael Skibbe (sacked 22 March 2011); Christoph Daum (signed 23 March 2011)
- Bundesliga: 17th
- DFB-Pokal: Round of 16
- Top goalscorer: League: Theofanis Gekas (16); All: Theofanis Gekas (18)
- Highest home attendance: 51,500 (league), 28 August 2010 v Hamburger SV) (multiple times)
- Lowest home attendance: 40,050 (league), 17 September 2010 v SC Freiburg)
- Average home league attendance: 47,353 (league)
Home colours	Away colours	Third colours

The 2010–11 season was Eintracht Frankfurt's 111th season and their 6th consecutive season in the German Bundesliga.

== Info ==
- Manager: Christoph Daum
- League: Bundesliga
- Shirt supplier: Jako
- Shirt sponsor: Fraport
- Average league attendance: 47,353
- League: 17th
- German Cup: Round 3
- League top goal scorer: Theofanis Gekas (16 goals)

== Transfers ==
=== Summer transfers in ===
- Habib Bellaïd loan return from Boulogne
- Theofanis Gekas from Bayer Leverkusen (was on loan to Hertha BSC)
- Sonny Kittel from Eintracht Frankfurt U17
- Sebastian Rode from Kickers Offenbach
- Andreas Rössl from Eintracht Frankfurt U23
- Markus Steinhöfer loan return from 1. FC Kaiserslautern
- Georgios Tzavelas from Panionios

=== Summer transfers out ===
- Habib Bellaïd loaned to Sedan until June 2011
- Alexander Krük to VfL Osnabrück (was already there on loan)
- Nikos Liberopoulos to AEK Athens
- Nikola Petković loaned to Tom Tomsk until January 2011
- Markus Pröll to Panionios
- Christoph Spycher to Young Boys
- Selim Teber to Kayserispor
- Faton Toski to VfL Bochum
- Juvhel Tsoumou to Alemannia Aachen
- Jan Zimmermann to Darmstadt 98

=== Winter transfers in ===
- Kevin Kraus from Eintracht Frankfurt U23
- Nikola Petković loan return from Tom Tomsk

=== Winter transfers out ===
- Marcos Alvarez to Bayern München II
- Ümit Korkmaz loaned to VfL Bochum until June 2011
- Nikola Petković loaned to Al-Ahli until June 2011
- Markus Steinhöfer to Basel
- Cenk Tosun to Gaziantepspor

== Players ==
Note: Flags indicate national team as defined under FIFA eligibility rules; some limited exceptions apply. Players may hold more than one non-FIFA nationality.

No.	Pos.	Nation	Player
1	GK	MKD	Oka Nikolov
2	DF	GER	Patrick Ochs
3	DF	SRB	Nikola Petkovic
4	DF	GER	Maik Franz (captain)
5	DF	MKD	Aleksandar Vasoski
7	MF	GER	Benjamin Köhler (vice-captain)
8	MF	BIH	Zlatan Bajramović
10	MF	TUR	Halil Altintop
11	FW	AUT	Ümit Korkmaz
13	MF	USA	Ricardo Clark
14	FW	GER	Alexander Meier
17	FW	CZE	Martin Fenin
18	FW	GRE	Ioannis Amanatidis
19	DF	GER	Kevin Kraus
20	MF	GER	Sebastian Rode
21	FW	GRE	Theofanis Gekas
22	GK	GER	Ralf Fahrmann
23	DF	GER	Marco Russ

No.	Pos.	Nation	Player
19	DF	GER	Kevin Kraus
20	MF	GER	Sebastian Rode
21	FW	GRE	Theofanis Gekas
22	GK	GER	Ralf Fahrmann
23	DF	GER	Marco Russ
24	DF	GER	Sebastian Jung
25	MF	GER	Marcel Heller
26	GK	GER	Andreas Rössl
27	MF	SUI	Pirmin Schwegler (3rd captain)
28	MF	GER	Sonny Kittel
29	DF	BRA	Chris
30	MF	BRA	Caio
31	DF	GRE	Georgios Tzavellas
32	GK	TUR	Aykut Özer
33	DF	GER	Markus Steinhöfer
35	FW	GER	Marcos Álvarez
36	MF	GER	Marcel Titsch Rivero
39	DF	GER	Julian Dudda

== Results ==
=== Friendly matches ===
10 July 2010 Friendly	FC Olympia 09 Fauerbach	0–13	Eintracht Frankfurt	Burgfeld, Friedberg
16:30 CET		Report	Steinhöfer 12'; Amanatidis 16', 37'; Alvarez 19'; Fenin 21', 30'; Ochs 38'; Altıntop 68', 70', 86'; Caio 80', 88'; Titsch-Rivero 85'	Attendance: 2,200

14 July 2010 Friendly	FSG Homberg/Ober-Ofleiden	3–10	Eintracht Frankfurt	An der Altenstadt, Homberg (Ohm)
18:00 CET	Kornmann 9'; Koch 29'; Koch 45'	Report	Tosun 2'; Steinhöfer 9'; Pötzl 15' (o.g.); Amanatidis 33'; Korkmaz 75'; Meier 79' (pen.); Russ 82'; Meier 87'; Korkmaz 88'; Meier 90'	Attendance: 2,500

18 July 2010 Friendly	VfB Marburg	0–3	Eintracht Frankfurt	Georg-Gaßmann-Stadion, Marburg
15:30 CET		Report	Alvarez 57'; Gekas 71'; Gekas 83'	Attendance: 3,000

21 July 2010 Friendly	Strasbourg	2–3	Eintracht Frankfurt	Rheinstadion, Kehl
18:30 CET	Sikimić 45'; Outrebon 78'	Report	Meier 41' (pen.); Altıntop 71'; Russ 75'	Attendance: 1,200

24 July 2010 Friendly	FC Union Niederkalbach	1–14	Eintracht Frankfurt	Sportanlage an der Hessenstraße, Kalbach
TBA	Krack 64'	Report	Heller 2'; Heller 7'; Köhler 9' (pen.); Amanatidis 12'; Gekas 17'; Caio 21'; Köhler 27'; Caio 30'; Gekas 33'; Gekas 35'; Caio 42'; Schwegler 43'; Gekas 44'; Korkmaz 62'	Attendance: 2,500

27 July 2010 Friendly	Eintracht Frankfurt	2–1	Racing Santander	Jahnstadion, Göttingen
18:30 CET	Caio 30'; Altıntop 57'	Report	Edu Bedia 90'	Attendance: 1,400

1 August 2010 Friendly	Eintracht Frankfurt	2–1	Chelsea	Commerzbank-Arena, Frankfurt
16:30 CET	Ochs 24'; Altıntop 82' (pen.)	Report	Lampard 63'	Attendance: 45,000

5 August 2010 Friendly	Eintracht Frankfurt	2–1	Palermo	Sportpark Weizenegg, Klagenfurt
18:00 CET	Altıntop 50' (pen.); Fenin 71'	Report	Maccarone 44'	Attendance: 500

7 August 2010 Friendly	Udinese	2–1	Eintracht Frankfurt	TBA, Tolmezzo
17:30 CET	Inler 53' (pen.); Inler 72' (pen.)	Report	Meier 47'; Ochs (red card) 78'	Attendance: 5,000

17 August 2010 Friendly	Sportfreunde Schwalbach	0–22	Eintracht Frankfurt	Limesstadion, Schwalbach am Taunus
18:00 CET		Report	Gekas 8', 12', 15', 23', 24', 41'; Caio 19'; Kittel 21', 29'; Heller 22', 42'; Korkmaz 26', 35'; Jung 39'; Amanatidis 51', 58', 74'; Altıntop 53', 73'; Meier 68', 70'; Köhler 89'	Attendance: 1,300

24 August 2010 Friendly	Viktoria Aschaffenburg	0–8	Eintracht Frankfurt	Stadion am Schönbusch, Aschaffenburg
18:00 CET		Report	Alvarez 11'; Caio 18'; Altıntop 26'; Caio 33'; Alvarez 37'; Alvarez 45'; Amanatidis 55'; Amanatidis 83'	Attendance: 1,000

31 August 2010 Friendly	Alemannia Haibach	1–8	Eintracht Frankfurt	Stadion am Hohen Kreuz, Haibach
18:00 CET	Bremig 68'	Report	Heller 56'; Köhler 58'; Steinhöfer 60'; Meier 66'; Caio 70'; Alvarez 75'; Alvarez 79'; Caio 86'	Attendance: 2,200

3 September 2010 Friendly	RSV Würges	1–3	Eintracht Frankfurt	RSV-Stadion Goldener Grund, Bad Camberg
18:00 CET	Görgülü 9'	Report	Steinhöfer 24'; Steinhöfer 64'; Amanatidis 69'	Attendance: 2,400

7 October 2010 Friendly	SV Hattersheim	0–14	Eintracht Frankfurt	Sportpark am Karl-Eckel-Weg, Hattersheim
17:00 CET		Report	Amanatidis 10'; Meier 13'; Amanatidis 42'; Gekas 46'; Köhler 58'; Köhler 60'; Korkmaz 74'; Heller 75'; Kittel 79'; Heller 80'; Ochs 82' (pen.); Heller 85'; Gekas 87'; Heller 90'	Attendance: 1,200

13 October 2010 Friendly	TG Hanau	0–20	Eintracht Frankfurt	Herbert Dröse Stadion, Hanau
17:00 CET		Report	Meier 3'; Korkmaz 5'; Amanatidis 9'; Kittel 11'; Köhler 19'; Korkmaz 30'; Korkmaz 31'; Fenin 40'; Meier 42'; Meier 44'; Tosun 49'; Tosun 52'; Tosun 54'; Gekas 61'; Alvarez 69'; Gekas 78'; Alvarez 80'; Gekas 86'; Alvarez 87'; Tosun 90'	Attendance: 1,300

3 January 2011 Indoor soccer (Hessen Cup)	Eintracht Frankfurt	2–2	VfL Bochum	Ballsporthalle, Frankfurt
14:45 CET	Fenin 16'; Heller 20'	Report	1'; 6'	Attendance: 5,000

3 January 2011 Indoor soccer (Hessen Cup)	Eintracht Frankfurt	1–2	SpVgg Greuther Fürth	Ballsporthalle, Frankfurt
16:33 CET	Kittel 10'	Report	8'; 15'	Attendance: 5,000

6 January 2011 Friendly (Antalya Cup semi final)	Persepolis	1–1 (1–3 p)	Eintracht Frankfurt	Mardan Sports Complex, Antalya, Turkey
21:15 CET	Mansouri 86' Penalty shooting Hashemian (penalty missed); Zarei (penalty scored); Fraga (penalty missed); Mansouri (penalty missed)	Report	Kraus 3' Penalty shooting Fenin (penalty missed); Tosun (penalty scored); Gekas (penalty scored); Alvarez (penalty scored)	Attendance: 250

8 January 2011 Friendly (Antalya Cup final)	1. FC Köln	1–1 (5–6 p)	Eintracht Frankfurt	Mardan Sports Complex, Antalya, Turkey
TBA	Podolski 52' Penalty shooting Petit (penalty missed); Brečko (penalty scored); Freis (penalty scored); Peszko (penalty missed); McKenna (penalty scored); Salger (penalty scored); Schorch (penalty scored); Pezzoni (penalty missed)	Report	Kraus 3' Penalty shooting Clark (penalty missed); Korkmaz (penalty scored); Amanatidis (penalty missed); Gekas (penalty scored); Altıntop (penalty scored); Rode (penalty scored); Titsch-Rivero (penalty scored); Jung (penalty scored)

=== Bundesliga ===
==== League table ====
Pos	Team	Pld	W	D	L	GF	GA	GD	Pts	Qualification or relegation
14	Schalke 04	34	11	7	16	38	44	−6	40	Qualification to Europa League play-off round (Note: Schalke 04 as winners of the 2010–11 DFB-Pokal qualified for the play-off round of the 2011–12 UEFA Europa League.)
15	VfL Wolfsburg	34	9	11	14	43	48	−5	38	
16	Borussia Mönchengladbach (O)	34	10	6	18	48	65	−17	36	Qualification to relegation play-offs
17	Eintracht Frankfurt (R)	34	9	7	18	31	49	−18	34	Relegation to 2. Bundesliga
18	FC St. Pauli (R)	34	8	5	21	35	68	−33	29	Relegation to 2. Bundesliga

Source: kicker
Rules for classification: 1) points; 2) goal difference; 3) number of goals scored.
(O) Play-off winners; (R) Relegated

==== Matches ====
21 August 2010 1	Hannover 96	2–1	Eintracht Frankfurt	AWD-Arena, Hanover
15:30 CET	Rausch 21'; Ya Konan 75'	Report	Köhler 27'	Attendance: 37,212

28 August 2010 2	Eintracht Frankfurt	1–3	Hamburger SV	Commerzbank-Arena, Frankfurt
15:30 CET	Ochs 37'	Report	Mathijsen 60'; Van Nistelrooy 80'; Guerrero 89'	Attendance: 51,500

11 September 2010 3	Borussia Mönchengladbach	0–4	Eintracht Frankfurt	Borussia-Park, Mönchengladbach
15:30 CET		Report	Köhler 24'; Gekas 36'; Ochs 37'; Gekas 64'	Attendance: 45,315

17 September 2010 4	Eintracht Frankfurt	0–1	SC Freiburg	Commerzbank-Arena, Frankfurt
20:30 CET		Report	Rosenthal 89'	Attendance: 40,600

22 September 2010 5	Bayer Leverkusen	2–1	Eintracht Frankfurt	BayArena, Leverkusen
20:00 CET	Bender 9'; Vidal 90' (pen.)	Report	Gekas 18'; Ochs (yellow card) 90' (red card)	Attendance: 24,400

25 September 2010 6	Eintracht Frankfurt	2–0	1. FC Nürnberg	Commerzbank-Arena, Frankfurt
15:30 CET	Gekas 17'; Chris 88'	Report		Attendance: 43,100

3 October 2010 7	VfB Stuttgart	1–2	Eintracht Frankfurt	Mercedes-Benz Arena, Stuttgart
15:30 CET	Delpierre (red card) 84'; Pogrebnyak 85'	Report	Gekas 18'; Chris 70'	Attendance: 44,000

17 October 2010 8	1. FC Kaiserslautern	0–3	Eintracht Frankfurt	Fritz Walter Stadion, Kaiserslautern
15:30 CET		Report	Gekas 45'; Gekas 67'; Meier 83'	Attendance: 49,780

23 October 2010 9	Eintracht Frankfurt	0–0	Schalke 04	Commerzbank-Arena, Frankfurt
15:30 CET		Report		Attendance: 51,500

30 October 2010 10	FC St. Pauli	1–3	Eintracht Frankfurt	Millerntor-Stadion, Hamburg
15:30 CET	Zambrano 5'; Asamoah (yellow card) 48' (yellow-red card)	Report	Gekas 42' (pen.); Gekas 70'; Caio 90'	Attendance: 24,330

6 November 2010 11	Eintracht Frankfurt	3–1	VfL Wolfsburg	Commerzbank-Arena, Frankfurt
15:30 CET	Gekas 26'; Schwegler 38'; Gekas 55' (pen.)	Report	Dejagah 66'	Attendance: 43,800

13 November 2010 12	Werder Bremen	0–0	Eintracht Frankfurt	Weserstadion, Bremen
15:30 CET		Report		Attendance: 34,000

20 November 2010 13	Eintracht Frankfurt	0–4	1899 Hoffenheim	Commerzbank-Arena, Frankfurt
15:30 CET		Report	Vukčević 31'; Ibišević 69'; Ibišević 70'; Mlapa 90'	Attendance: 44,300

27 November 2010 14	Bayern Munich	4–1	Eintracht Frankfurt	Allianz Arena, Munich
15:30 CET	Tymoshchuk 29'; Müller 59'; Gómez 61'; Tymoshchuk 88'	Report	Gekas 33'	Attendance: 69,000

4 December 2010 15	Eintracht Frankfurt	2–1	Mainz 05	Commerzbank-Arena, Frankfurt
15:30 CET	Russ 35'; Gekas 84' (pen.)	Report	Schürrle 42' (pen.)	Attendance: 51,500

11 December 2010 16	1. FC Köln	1–0	Eintracht Frankfurt	RheinEnergieStadion, Cologne
15:30 CET	Clemens 56'	Report		Attendance: 45,000

18 December 2010 17	Eintracht Frankfurt	1–0	Borussia Dortmund	Commerzbank-Arena, Frankfurt
15:30 CET	Gekas 87'	Report		Attendance: 51,500

16 January 2011 18	Eintracht Frankfurt	0–3	Hannover 96	Commerzbank-Arena, Frankfurt
15:30 CET		Report	Abdellaoue 15'; Schulz 21'; Konan Ya 89'	Attendance: 39,300

21 January 2011 19	Hamburger SV	1–0	Eintracht Frankfurt	Imtech Arena, Hamburg
20:30 CET	Petrić 65'	Report		Attendance: 50,239

30 January 2011 20	Eintracht Frankfurt	0–1	Borussia Mönchengladbach	Commerzbank-Arena, Frankfurt
17:30 CET		Report	De Camargo 84'	Attendance: 43,700

6 February 2011 21	SC Freiburg	0–0	Eintracht Frankfurt	Dreisamstadion, Freiburg
17:30 CET		Report		Attendance: 21,900

12 February 2011 22	Eintracht Frankfurt	0–3	Bayer Leverkusen	Commerzbank-Arena, Frankfurt
15:30 CET		Report	Rolfes 9'; Augusto 32'; Balitsch 84'	Attendance: 42,600

18 February 2011 23	1. FC Nürnberg	3–0	Eintracht Frankfurt	Frankenstadion, Nuremberg
20:30 CET	Schieber 67'; Mak 70'; Cohen 87'	Report		Attendance: 40,853

27 February 2011 24	Eintracht Frankfurt	0–2	VfB Stuttgart	Commerzbank-Arena, Frankfurt
15:30 CET		Report	Delpierre (red card) 15'; Harnik 64'; Hajnal 68'	Attendance: 47,400

5 March 2011 25	Eintracht Frankfurt	0–0	1. FC Kaiserslautern	Commerzbank-Arena, Frankfurt
15:30 CET		Report		Attendance: 49,400

12 March 2011 26	Schalke 04	2–1	Eintracht Frankfurt	Veltins-Arena, Gelsenkirchen
15:30 CET	Jurado 45' (pen.); Charisteas 84'	Report	Tzavelas 70'	Attendance: 61,673

19 March 2011 27	Eintracht Frankfurt	2–1	FC St. Pauli	Commerzbank-Arena, Frankfurt
15:30 CET	Gekas 34' (pen.); Gekas 77'	Report	Takyi 43'	Attendance: 50,500

3 April 2011 28	VfL Wolfsburg	1–1	Eintracht Frankfurt	Volkswagen Arena, Wolfsburg
15:30 CET	Mandžukić 80'	Report	Meier 59'	Attendance: 29,125

8 April 2011 29	Eintracht Frankfurt	1–1	Werder Bremen	Commerzbank-Arena, Frankfurt
15:30 CET	Fenin 83'	Report	Altıntop 58' (o.g.)	Attendance: 51,500

16 April 2011 30	1899 Hoffenheim	1–0	Eintracht Frankfurt	Rhein-Neckar-Arena, Sinsheim
15:30 CET	Firmino 78'	Report		Attendance: 30,150

23 April 2011 31	Eintracht Frankfurt	1–1	Bayern Munich	Commerzbank-Arena, Frankfurt
15:30 CET	Rode 54'	Report	Gómez 89' (pen.)	Attendance: 51,500

30 April 2011 32	Mainz 05	3–0	Eintracht Frankfurt	Stadion am Bruchweg, Mainz
15:30 CET	Ivanschitz 26'; Soto 38'; Soto 44'	Report		Attendance: 20,300

7 May 2011 33	Eintracht Frankfurt	0–2	1. FC Köln	Commerzbank-Arena, Frankfurt
15:30 CET		Report	Chihi 24'; Podolski 90' (pen.)	Attendance: 51,500

14 May 2011 34	Borussia Dortmund	3–1	Eintracht Frankfurt	Westfalenstadion, Dortmund
15:30 CET	Barrios 68'; Russ 72' (o.g.); Barrios 90'	Report	Rode 46'; Titsch-Rivero (red card) 80'	Attendance: 80,720

=== DFB-Pokal ===
13 August 2010 First round	SV Wilhelmshaven	0–4	Eintracht Frankfurt	Jadestadion, Wilhelmshaven
19:00 CET		Report	Amanatidis 21'; Tzavelas 38'; Ochs 59'; Altıntop 89'	Attendance: 6,485

27 October 2010 Second round	Eintracht Frankfurt	5–2	Hamburger SV	Commerzbank-Arena, Frankfurt
19:00 CET	Caio 13'; Gekas 21'; Gekas 45'; Petrić 65' (o.g.); Altıntop 87' (pen.)	Report	Petrić 23'; Petrić 66'	Attendance: 39,400

22 December 2010 Round of 16	Alemannia Aachen	0–0; 1–1 (a.e.t.) (5–3 p)	Eintracht Frankfurt	Tivoli, Aachen
20:30 CET	Höger 93' Penalty shooting Junglas (penalty scored); Achenbach (penalty scored); Arslan (penalty scored); Stehle (penalty scored); Auer (penalty scored)	Report	Fenin 99' Penalty shooting Fenin (penalty scored); Meier (penalty missed); Caio (penalty scored); Amanatidis (penalty scored)	Attendance: 32,160
