= Cha Du-ri =

German-born South Korean footballer (born 1980)

Cha Du-ri 차두리
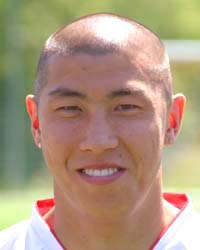
- Cha in 2006

Personal information
- Date of birth: 25 July 1980 (age 46)
- Place of birth: Frankfurt, West Germany
- Height: 1.81 m (5 ft 11 in)
- Positions: Right-back; right winger

Youth career
- 1996–1998: Paichai High School

College career
Years	Team	Apps	(Gls)
1999–2002	Korea University		

Senior career*
Years	Team	Apps	(Gls)
2002–2004	Bayer Leverkusen	0	(0)
2002–2003	→ Arminia Bielefeld (loan)	22	(1)
2003–2004	→ Eintracht Frankfurt (loan)	31	(1)
2004–2006	Eintracht Frankfurt	56	(11)
2006–2007	Mainz 05	12	(0)
2007–2009	TuS Koblenz	61	(3)
2009–2010	SC Freiburg	23	(1)
2010–2012	Celtic	31	(2)
2012–2013	Fortuna Düsseldorf	10	(0)
2013–2015	FC Seoul	82	(2)
Total		328	(21)

International career
2001–2015	South Korea	76	(4)

Managerial career
- 2025–: Hwaseong FC
Medal record
Men's football
Representing South Korea
AFC Asian Cup
Silver medal – second place	2015 Australia	Team
Bronze medal – third place	2011 Qatar	Team
- * Club domestic league appearances and goals

- Cha Du-ri
- Hangul: 차두리
- Hanja: 車두리
- RR: Cha Duri
- MR: Ch'a Turi

Cha Du-ri (Korean: 차두리; Korean pronunciation: [tɕʰa.du.ɾi] or [tɕʰa] [tu.ɾi]; born 25 July 1980) is a professional manager and former footballer. He played as a right back, right winger, or striker. Born in Germany, he is the first Korean player who was born outside of Korea to have played in a FIFA World Cup. During the third-place match of the 2011 AFC Asian Cup against Uzbekistan, Cha captained the national team in place of the regular Korean captain, Park Ji-sung.

Cha also played for one of his father Cha Bum-kun's clubs, Eintracht Frankfurt.

== Early life ==
Cha was born in Frankfurt am Main in then-West Germany, when his father Cha Bum-kun was playing in the Bundesliga for Eintracht Frankfurt. He spent his childhood in Germany while his father was playing for Frankfurt and later for Bayer Leverkusen. Cha lived in West Germany until he moved to South Korea when he was ten. Growing up, Cha was described by his father as having "a very optimistic mindset" and being "open and honest".

== Club career ==
=== Arminia Bielefeld ===
Cha started out at Korea University before beginning his club career in Germany, starting at Bayer Leverkusen, which he joined on 28 July 2002. However, he did not get straight into the first team at Bayer Leverkusen instead getting loaned out to Arminia Bielefeld for the 2002–03 season.

On 11 September 2002, he made his Arminia Bielefield debut in his first start, a 1–1 draw against 1. FC Kaiserslautern. Thereafter, Cha established himself in the first team at Arminia Bielefield. On 25 January 2003, he scored his first goal for the club, as well as setting up a goal, in a 2–2 draw against Werder Bremen. In the 2002–03 season, Cha made 22 appearances and scored once for the club.

=== Eintracht Frankfurt ===
Despite Arminia Bielefield's interest to keep him on for a second term, Cha opted to join Eintracht Frankfurt on a two-year loan deal.

Cha made his Eintracht Frankfurt debut in the opening game of the season, a 3–1 loss against Bayern Munich. Since making his debut for Eintracht Frankfurt, Cha began to play as a striker and remained in the first team despite struggling to score. On 22 February 2004, he scored his first Eintracht Frankfurt goal, in a 2–1 win over Hertha BSC. After finishing the season, which saw the club relegated to 2. Bundesliga, Cha made 33 appearances and scored once in all competitions. Following this, he joined the club on a permanent basis in the summer, signing a two–year contract, keeping him until 2006.

After missing a game at the start of the season due to international commitments, Cha's first game after signing for Eintracht Frankfurt on a permanent basis came on 15 August 2004, coming on as a substitute in the second half, in a 2–1 win over Karlsruher SC. Cha scored his first goal on 22 September 2004, in a 4–2 win over Greuther Fürth in the second round of the DFB-Pokal. By the end of 2004, Cha scored two more goals against LR Ahlen on 26 October 2004 and against Wacker Burghausen on 10 December 2004. Cha later scored six more goals later in the season against Rot-Weiß Oberhausen, SpVgg Unterhaching, Erzgebirge Aue, Eintracht Trier (twice) and Rot-Weiß Erfurt. After helping the club achieve promotion back into the top flight, Cha went on to finish the 2004–05 season, making 32 appearances and scoring nine times in all competitions.

In the 2005–06 season, Cha continued to be in the first team and scored his first goal of the season, right after he came on as a late substitute for Christoph Preuß, in a 1–1 draw against Hamburg on 17 September 2005. After suffering an injury that kept him out for weeks, Cha returned to the first team on 22 October 2005, in a 6–3 win over 1. FC Köln Cha then played in a right–back position on 9 December 2005 for the first time, in a 1–0 win over Borussia Dortmund and scored against them again in their second meeting of the season, in a 1–1 draw on 6 May 2006. Though he lost his first team place during the season, Cha managed to regain it when he began to play in the right–back position for the rest of the season and was an unused substitute in the final of DFB-Pokal, in a 1–0 loss against Bayern Munich. Despite this, Cha made 30 appearances and scored three times in all competitions.

=== Mainz 05 ===
With his contract expiring at the end of the season at Eintracht Frankfurt, Cha joined Mainz 05 on a free transfer on 14 May 2006, signing a two–year contract.

After appearing as an unused substitute in the opening game of the season, Cha made his Mainz debut on 19 August 2006, where he made his first start, in a 1–1 draw against Borussia Dortmund. Before the 2006–07 season kicked off, Cha changed his position from striker to right wingback for Mainz 05 but throughout the season, he was hampered with a foot injury that prevented him from joining the starting line-up or even getting any playing time. Despite this, Cha went on to make thirteen appearances in all competitions at Mainz.

After the 2006–07 season, Mainz 05 were relegated to 2. Bundesliga, and subsequently, Cha terminated his contract.

=== TuS Koblenz ===
During the 2007 off-season, Cha signed on a free transfer with TuS Koblenz in the 2. Bundesliga for the 2007–08 season.

Cha made his debut for the club in the opening game of the season, where he played in midfield in a 4–1 loss against his former club, Mainz 05. He played in the roles of right winger, supporting striker, and the centre forward position, after his failure to adjust to right wingback for Mainz 05. On 23 November 2007, Cha scored his first Koblenz goal, right after coming on as a substitute, in a 2–0 win over Wehen Wiesbaden.

At the start of the 2008–09 season, Cha started the season well when he set up one of the goals, in a 3–0 win over Oberhausen in the opening game of the season. In a 4–1 win over Rot Weiss Ahlen on 28 November 2008, Cha provided a hat–trick of assists. Later in the 2008–09 season, Cha scored two more goals against Hansa Rostock, and MSV Duisburg.

=== SC Freiburg ===
After two years at the club, Cha left TuS Koblenz despite their attempts to keep him when his contract expired at the end of the 2008–09 season. and signed a contract for two years with SC Freiburg.

Cha made his Freiburg debut, where he made his first start and played the whole game, in a 1–1 draw against Hamburger SV in the opening game of the season. Cha scored his first goal for the club, which turned out to be the winning goal, in a 1–0 win over Schalke 04. As the 2009–10 season progressed, Cha continued to remain in the first team until he suffered an injury that kept him out for the season. Cha finished his first season at Freiburg, making 25 appearances and scoring once in all competitions.

=== Celtic ===
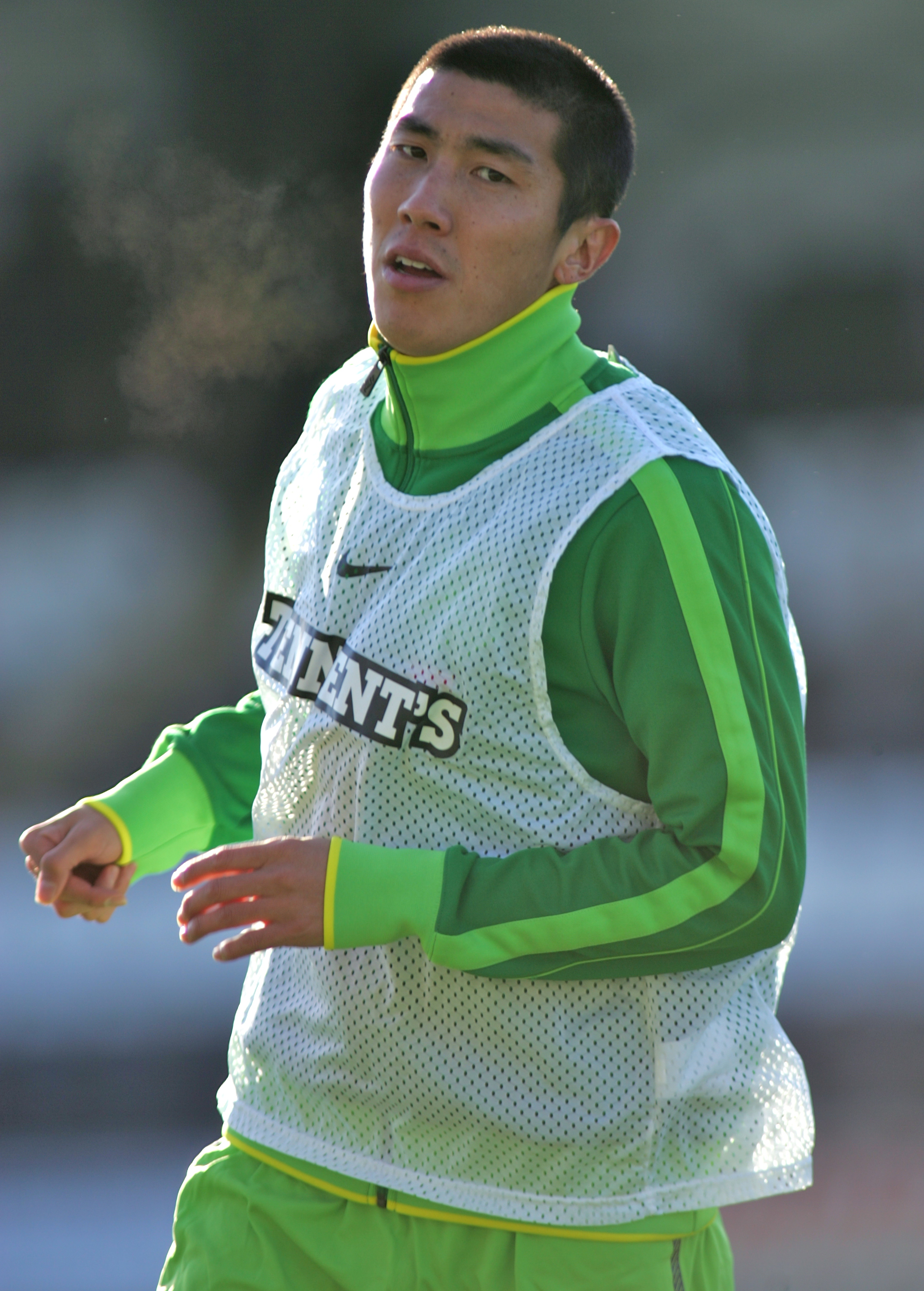
Cha with Celtic in 2010.

Following interest from Celtic, Cha arrived in Glasgow for a medical on 30 June 2010. In an interview regarding his move to Parkhead, Cha expressed his desire to compete in an Old Firm derby. Cha signed for Celtic pending approval of a work permit. In doing so he joined up with his national teammate Ki Sung-yueng.

On 28 July 2010, Cha made his Celtic debut in the UEFA Champions League Third qualifying round against Braga, a 3–0 defeat and on 14 August made his SPL debut against Inverness Caledonian Thistle in a 1–0 win over the Highland side. Cha then scored his first Celtic goal against St Johnstone in the SPL on 26 December 2010. However, international commitment and his own injury limited him to 21 appearances and one goal in all competitions in his first season at Celtic.

In the 2011–12 season, Cha continued to struggle at the start of the season, due to his international commitment and his own injury concerns. Cha also faced competition with new signing Adam Matthews at the right–back position. Cha scored an own goal in a UEFA Europa League match against Rennes, which resulted a 1–1 draw, after a Benoît Costil kick was making its way harmlessly through to Fraser Forster but there appeared to be no communication between him and Cha Du-ri, who helped it on and then watched in horror as the ball slipped past the Hoops keeper and in to the net. Despite suffering an injury during international duties, Cha was given a handful of first team appearances following Emilio Izaguirre's injury at the end of the year. On 25 March 2012, Cha was sent off in the Old Firm derby, which Celtic lost 3–2. After serving a one match suspension, Cha returned to the first team on 22 April 2012 against Motherwell and scored in a 3–0 win.

Cha was a fan of the Celtic support, who changed “Don’t ‘cha wish your full back was Cha Du-Ri” to the tune of The Pussycat Dolls’ “Don’t Cha”.

=== Fortuna Düsseldorf ===
On 8 June 2012, Cha agreed a two-year contract with newly promoted Bundesliga club Fortuna Düsseldorf. In his last months at Celtic, Cha criticised the playing style of Scottish football, stating: "at Celtic we were expected to win every game and most of the time we managed it."

Despite appearing as an unused substitute in a match against Wacker Burghausen in the first round of DFB–Pokal, which saw Fortuna Düsseldorf win 1–0, Cha was out of the squad for weeks, which was later revealed to be due to personal issues. On 22 September 2012, he made his Fortuna Düsseldorf debut, where he came on as a late substitute in a 0–0 draw against his former club, SC Freiburg. However, Cha who preferred defensive position didn't want to play as a forward for Düsseldorf, and sometimes took special leave due to family trouble. As a result, Cha was released by Fortuna Düsseldorf on 13 February 2013 despite having a year left on his contract.

=== FC Seoul ===
On 25 March 2013, Cha agreed a two-year contract with FC Seoul in K League 1, marking his first time that he played professionally for a club in his home country.

Cha made his Seoul debut on 14 April 2013, in a 1–1 draw against Suwon Samsung Bluewings after missing out on the first two matches. After being suspended in the previous leg, Cha played in the second leg of the AFC Champions League Final against Guangzhou Evergrande, with Guangzhou Evergrande winning on away goals. Despite this, Cha finished his first season making 35 appearances in all competition.

The 2014 season saw Cha continue to be a first team regular at the club and make an impressive display that would see him almost earn a spot for the World Cup in Brazil. He was eventually cut from the 23-man squad. Despite missing several matches, due to international commitments on two occasions, Cha made 37 appearances in all competitions and, at the end of the 2014 season, was named in the K League 1 Best XI. Cha was also shortlisted for K League 1 Most Valuable Player, but lost out to Lee Dong-gook. Following this, Cha signed a new contract with the club, signing a one-year contract extension.

The 2015 season saw Cha continued to be in the first team regular despite suffering from injuries. In May, Cha was appointed Seoul's new captain, succeeding Koh Myong-jin, who departed for Al-Rayyan. Cha scored his first Seoul goal on 11 July 2015, in a 3–1 loss against Pohang Steelers. Cha then scored his second goal on 19 September 2015, in a 3–0 win over Suwon Samsung Bluewings. After making 35 appearances and scoring two times in all competitions, Cha announced his retirement on 31 October 2015 after winning the final of Korean FA Cup despite 3 matches remaining in the 2015 K League 1. Despite this, Cha was named in the K League 1 Best XI for the second time at the end of the season.

== International career ==
Cha was noticed by coach Guus Hiddink when the South Korea national team played a practice match against Korea University. Strong, aggressive and pacey, he was still playing amateur football when he made his debut for the national team in 2001. Cha then scored his first goal for the national team in a friendly match against Costa Rica on 20 April 2002.

Cha was included in the South Korea football team for 2002 FIFA World Cup, even though his playing time was limited to off-the-bench appearances. South Korea surprised the football world by advancing to the semi-finals of the tournament, beating Spain and Italy along the way. Their run ended in the semi-finals when they were eliminated after losing, 1–0, to Germany, with Michael Ballack netting the only goal. Cha played in the 2004 AFC Asian Cup, scoring a goal against Kuwait. However, they were eliminated in the quarterfinals after a 4–3 loss to Iran.

Cha was left off of Korea's roster for the 2006 FIFA World Cup, and instead acted as a colour commentator for MBC's live telecasts of the tournament's games alongside his father. Pim Verbeek, South Korea's head coach, added him into his squad for the qualification of the 2007 AFC Asian Cup but was not selected for the final team. On 14 October 2009, Cha was called back to international duty against Senegal. It was the first time Cha had been selected for the Korean national team since late 2006.

After being called up by the national team for the provisional squad for the World Cup, Cha was called up in the final squad despite facing injuries had that kept him out of the squad. In the 2010 FIFA World Cup, Cha played as an attacking right-back during the first half of the game against Greece, venturing forward and providing an attacking threat on the right side. During the second half, South Korea were leading so he stayed back in a more defensive role for his side. He did not take part in the following qualifying match against Argentina and South Korea lost 4–1. He was influential in the next match against Nigeria. On 26 June, Cha notched his 50th cap but South Korea were eliminated in the round of 16 2–1 by Uruguay.

Cha was selected for the final team for the 2011 AFC Asian Cup and started in every game as the team made it to the semifinals before losing to Japan via penalties following a 2–2 draw. He was made captain of the team in the third place match against Uzbekistan, replacing Park Ji-sung, who had retired from international duty following the loss to Japan.

Cha was not selected for the 2014 FIFA World Cup but was called up to play in the 2015 AFC Asian Cup. Cha played his last international cap against Australia in the tournament's final match where Australia won 2–1. He announced his international retirement after the match. Following this, Cha was named in the AFC Asian Cup Team of the Tournament. He was called up again for a final international match in a friendly against New Zealand in a testimonial match, where he received a standing ovation following his substitution at half time.

== Personal life ==
Cha married his wife Shin Hye-sung, the daughter of a wealthy hotel magnate, in 2008. Their daughter, the first of two children, was born in February 2010. In August 2012, Cha and his wife separated after she was reportedly unwilling to live in Germany following his move to Fortuna Düsseldorf. Cha was given a special leave as a result. In April 2013, Cha filed for divorce. Three years on, the divorce was finalized and the court ruled in favor of Shin after rejecting claims that Cha was treated unfairly by his wife due to lack of evidence. His request for parental rights and custody of the couple's two children was also rejected.

He is the son of Cha Bum-kun, one of the greatest Asian footballers in history. Fluent in English and Dutch, Cha is a native speaker of German and Korean.

== Managerial career ==
On 6 December 2024, Cha was officially announced as manager of Hwaseong FC starting from the 2025 season.

== Career statistics ==
=== Club ===
Appearances and goals by club, season and competition
Club	Season	League			National cup		League cup		Continental		Total	
Club	Season	Division	Apps	Goals	Apps	Goals	Apps	Goals	Apps	Goals	Apps	Goals
Arminia Bielefeld (loan)	2002–03	Bundesliga	22	1	2	0	—		—		24	1
Eintracht Frankfurt (loan)	2003–04	Bundesliga	31	1	2	0	—		—		33	1
Eintracht Frankfurt	2004–05	2. Bundesliga	29	8	3	1	—		—		32	9
Eintracht Frankfurt	2005–06	Bundesliga	27	3	3	0	—		—		30	3
Eintracht Frankfurt	Total		56	11	6	1	0	0	0	0	62	12
Mainz 05	2006–07	Bundesliga	12	0	1	0	—		—		13	0
TuS Koblenz	2007–08	2. Bundesliga	28	1	0	0	—		—		28	1
TuS Koblenz	2008–09	2. Bundesliga	33	2	1	0	—		—		34	2
TuS Koblenz	Total		51	3	1	0	0	0	0	0	52	3
SC Freiburg	2009–10	Bundesliga	23	1	2	0	—		—		25	1
Celtic	2010–11	Scottish Premier League	17	1	1	0	1	0	3	0	22	1
Celtic	2011–12	Scottish Premier League	14	1	1	0	2	0	4	0	21	1
Celtic	Total		31	2	2	0	3	0	7	0	43	2
Fortuna Düsseldorf	2012–13	Bundesliga	10	0	1	0	—		—		11	0
FC Seoul	2013	K League 1	30	0	0	0	—		5	0	35	0
FC Seoul	2014	K League 1	28	0	4	0	—		12	0	44	0
FC Seoul	2015	K League 1	24	2	3	0	—		8	0	35	2
FC Seoul	Total		82	2	7	0	0	0	25	0	114	2
Career total			328	21	24	1	3	0	32	0	387	22

=== International ===
Appearances and goals by national team and year
National team	Year	Apps	Goals
South Korea	2001	3	0
South Korea	2002	16	1
South Korea	2003	4	0
South Korea	2004	9	3
South Korea	2005	5	0
South Korea	2006	1	0
South Korea	2009	3	0
South Korea	2010	10	0
South Korea	2011	13	0
South Korea	2014	5	0
South Korea	2015	6	0
Total		75	4

Scores and results list South Korea's goal tally first, score column indicates score after each Du-ri goal.

List of international goals scored by Cha Du-ri
No.	Date	Venue	Opponent	Score	Result	Competition	Ref.
1	20 April 2002	Daegu World Cup Stadium, Daegu, South Korea	Costa Rica	1–0	2–0	Friendly	
2	18 February 2004	Suwon World Cup Stadium, Suwon, South Korea	Lebanon	1–0	2–0	2006 FIFA World Cup qualification	
3	14 July 2014	Seoul World Cup Stadium, Seoul, South Korea	Trinidad and Tobago	1–0	1–1	Friendly	
4	27 July 2004	Shandong Provincial Stadium, Jinan, China	Kuwait	3–0	4–0	2004 AFC Asian Cup	

== Managerial statistics ==
As of match played 28 September 2025

Managerial record by team and tenure
Team	From	To	Record					Ref.
Team	From	To	Pld	W	D	L	Win %	Ref.
Hwaseong FC	6 December 2024	Present	34	10	15	9	29.41	

== Honours ==
Eintracht Frankfurt

- DFB-Pokal runner-up: 2005–06

Celtic

- Scottish Premier League: 2011–12
- Scottish Cup: 2010–11
- Scottish League Cup runner-up: 2011–12

FC Seoul

- Korean FA Cup: 2015
- AFC Champions League runner-up: 2013

South Korea

- AFC Asian Cup runner-up: 2015
- AFC Asian Cup third place: 2011

Individual

- K League All-Star: 2013, 2014, 2015
- K League 1 Best XI: 2014, 2015
- AFC Asian Cup Team of the Tournament: 2015
