= Jochen Drees =

German football referee (born 1970)

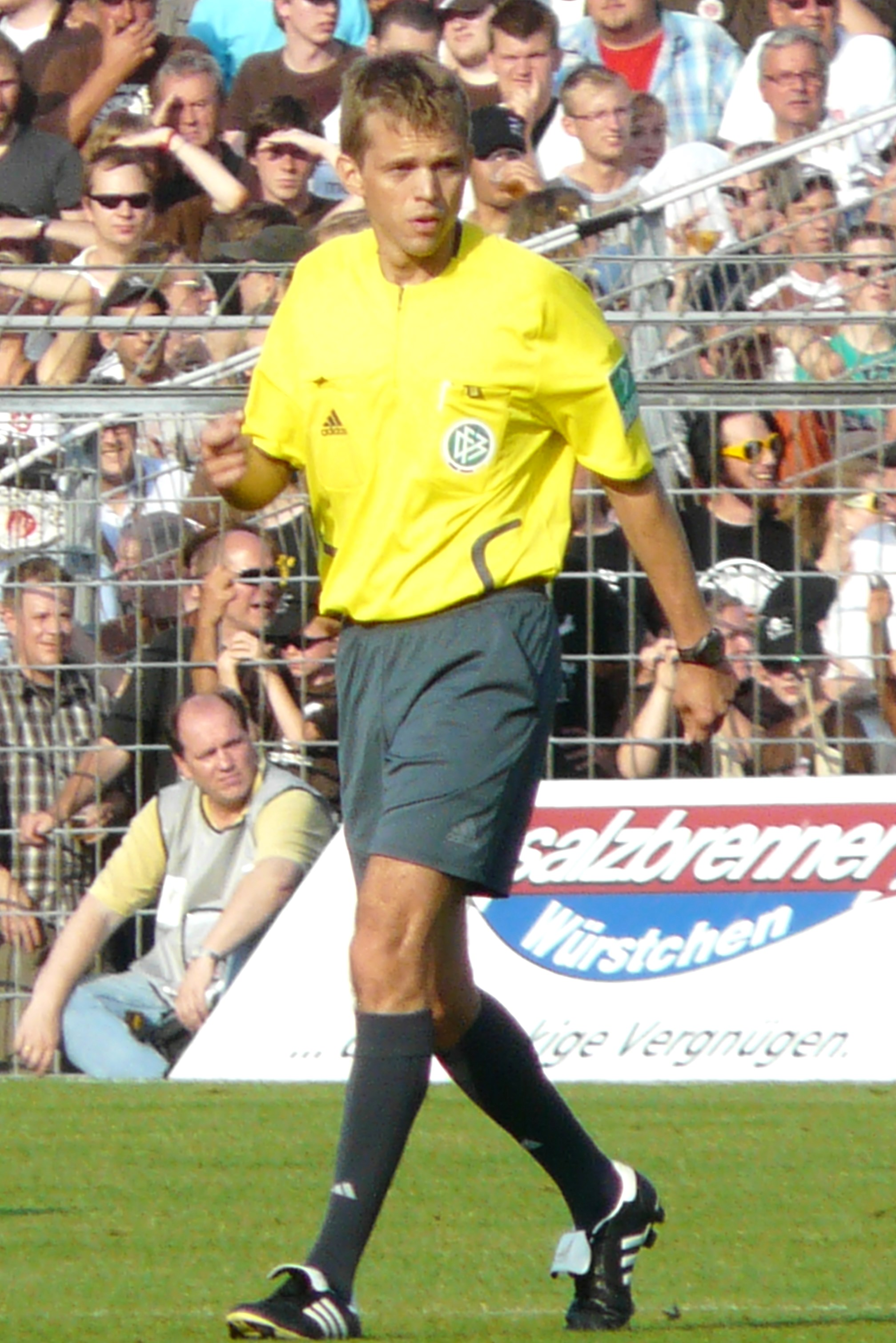
- Drees in 2009
- Full name: Jochen Herbert Drees
- Born: 15 March 1970 (age 56); Bad Kreuznach, West Germany
- Other occupation: Family physician

Domestic
Years	League	Role
2001–2017	DFB	Referee
2003–2017	2. Bundesliga	Referee
2005–2017	Bundesliga	Referee

Jochen Herbert Drees (born 15 March 1970) is a former German football referee who is based in Münster-Sarmsheim. He refereed for SV Blau Weiß Münster-Sarmsheim of the Southwest German Football Association.

== Refereeing career ==
Drees was referee for SV Blau Weiß Münster-Sarmsheim, and officiated on the DFB level since 2001. In 2003, he was appointed to officiate in the 2. Bundesliga. Drees became a Bundesliga referee at the start of the 2005–06 season, replacing the retired Torsten Koop. His first Bundesliga appearance was on 24 September 2005 in the match between VfL Wolfsburg and Eintracht Frankfurt. He was chosen as a fourth official for the referee team led by Herbert Fandel for the 2006 DFB-Pokal Final between Eintracht Frankfurt and Bayern Munich.

On 11 April 2008, Drees abandoned the Bundesliga match between 1. FC Nürnberg and VfL Wolfsburg due to heavy rain. It was the first Bundesliga match abandoned since 1976, and the first because of rain. It was only the sixth match abandoned in the history of the Bundesliga.

Drees retired from officiating in 2017 because he reached the age limit for German referees, which is 47. His final Bundesliga match officiated was between Bayern Munich and SC Freiburg.

== Personal life ==
In 1989, Drees graduated from the Stefan-George-Gymnasium in Bingen am Rhein. From 1990 to 1997, he studied medicine at the University of Mainz. Since 2001, Drees has been in the practise of his father, who retired in 2003, working as a general practitioner. Drees lives in Münster-Sarmsheim.
