= Francisco Copado =

Spanish-German footballer

Personal information
- Full name: Francisco Alberto Copado Álvarez
- Date of birth: 19 July 1974 (age 52)
- Place of birth: Kiel, West Germany
- Height: 1.71 m (5 ft 7 in)
- Positions: Striker; midfielder

Youth career
- 1980–1989: Eintracht Kiel
- 1989–1991: Holstein Kiel

Senior career*
Years	Team	Apps	(Gls)
1991–1995	Hamburger SV	13	(0)
1996–1997	Mallorca	48	(6)
1997–2000	Tennis Borussia Berlin	79	(18)
2000–2005	SpVgg Unterhaching	117	(60)
2005–2006	Eintracht Frankfurt	25	(6)
2006–2008	1899 Hoffenheim	66	(25)
2009	SpVgg Unterhaching	6	(1)
Total		354	(116)

Managerial career
- 2012–2014: SpVgg Unterhaching (youth)
- 2014–2015: SpVgg Unterhaching (assistant)
- * Club domestic league appearances and goals

Francisco Alberto Copado Álvarez (born 19 July 1974) is a German retired footballer who played as a striker or midfielder.

== Career ==
The son of Spanish immigrants, Copado began his football career in his hometown of Kiel, initially at Eintracht Kiel and later with Holstein Kiel, where he came through the youth ranks. For the 1992–93 season he received a professional contract from Hamburger SV, whose scouts had been keeping a close eye on the young offensive player.

From 1993 to 1995 Copado played in three Bundesliga matches, the first on 20 November 1993 as a late substitute in a 3–0 away loss against 1. FC Kaiserslautern. In 1995–96 he amassed a further ten appearances under Felix Magath, before leaving the club in the winter transfer window.

Copado subsequently moved to Spain, joining Segunda División team RCD Mallorca in January 1996. In his first full season he contributed two goals in 30 games (his first in a 1–0 win at Real Madrid Castilla), helping win promotion to La Liga.

However, Copado would never play in Spain's top level, as he left in July 1997 and joined lower league side Tennis Borussia Berlin – there, he played under Hermann Gerland, the manager mostly associated with the player's explosion. He ended the season with 12 goals as TeBe was unbeaten and became Regionalliga Nord champions; in the 2. Bundesliga, he would only score six goals in the following two seasons combined.

For the 2000–01 campaign top division club SpVgg Unterhaching bought Copado, at the express petition of club manager Lorenz-Günther Köstner. However, after a few games, the player failed to produce on the pitch (including training), while also gaining a reputation for excessive partying. Therefore, he was suspended for ten months due to disciplinary reasons – during this time, he was forced to train on his own, and only when Köstner was fired on 13 September 2001 (with the club previously having been relegated) did the situation clear; Rainer Adrion took over the ruins and the player was forgiven, but Unterhaching dropped another level.

Under Wolfgang Frank, who made him team captain, Copado netted an incredible 58 league goals in three seasons (being instrumental in the side's return to the second level in 2003), operating as both forward and midfielder. Due to those solid performances, the 31-year-old returned to the top flight for the third time in his career, joining Eintracht Frankfurt on a three-year contract.

Copado eventually broke into the first team after early difficulties, scoring six goals during the season – in December 2005 he was even awarded the Player of the Month award. However, he only managed one goal in his 14 last appearances, losing the confidence of manager Friedhelm Funkel and subsequently being sold in the following transfer window (although he still appeared in the first match of 2006–07).

Copado joined TSG 1899 Hoffenheim on 30 August 2006, being a crucial offensive element in the club's rise from the third (Regionalliga Süd) to the first level in just two seasons (14 goals in his first year, ten in the second). He appeared sparingly during the campaign's first half, managing to score a penalty in Hoffenheim's 3–0 home win over Arminia Bielefeld on 29 November 2008. On 16 December he was released from contract, returning to former side Unterhaching and retiring on 31 March 2009, having played his last game the previous day.

From 2012 onwards Copado continued working with Unterhaching, as director of football and youth and assistant manager.

== Personal life ==
Copado is the brother-in-law of Hasan Salihamidžić, to whom his sister is married. During his playing days at Mallorca, he was often referred to as Paco.

Copado married Eva Schrobenhauser, daughter of former side Unterhaching's owner Anton Schrobenhauser, on 31 May 2008. They have two sons together, including Lucas Copado, a footballer for Bayern Munich. Copado and Schrobenhauser later separated.
