= Alexander Meier =

German footballer (born 1983)

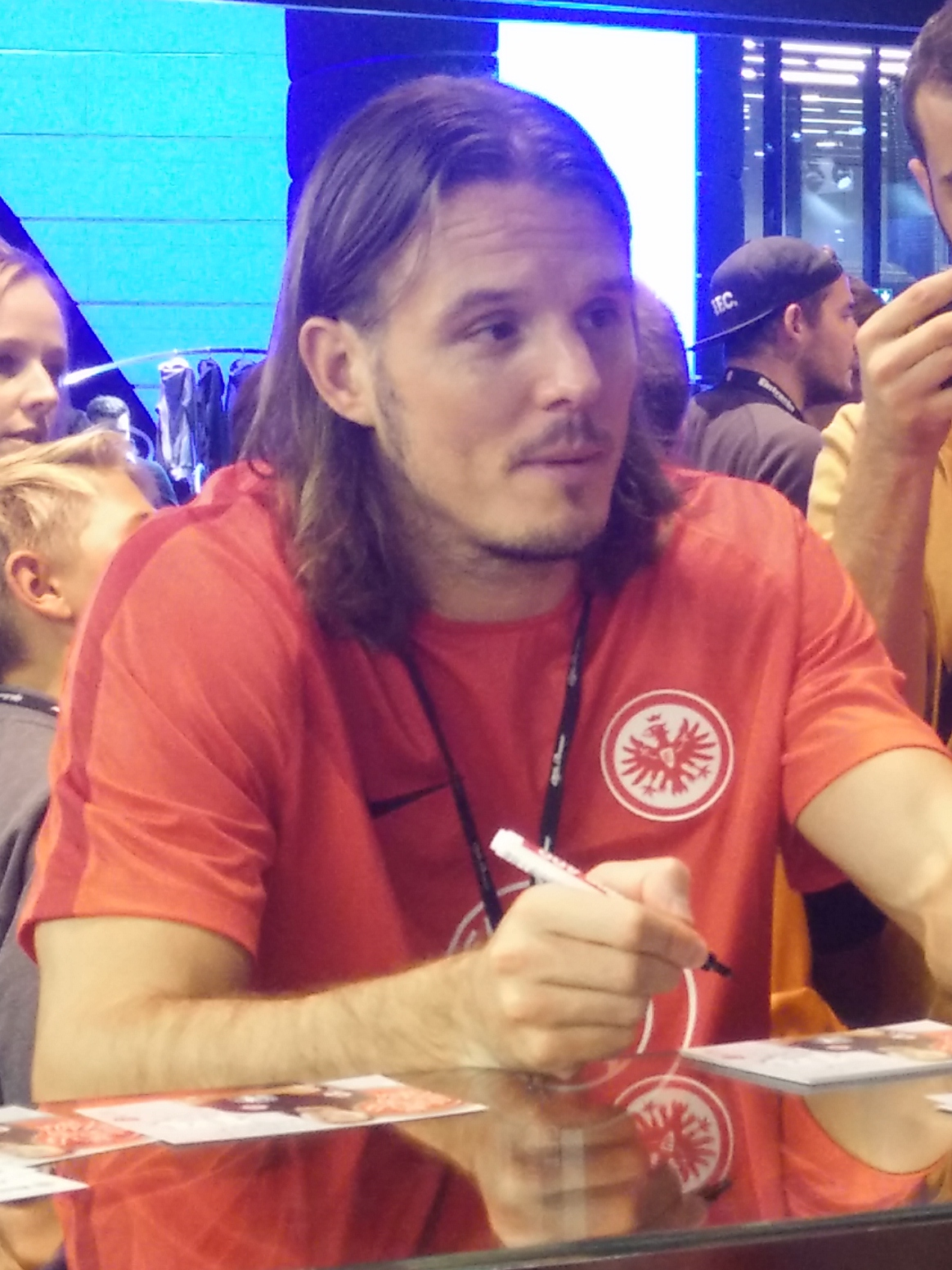
- Meier in 2015

Personal information
- Date of birth: 17 January 1983 (age 43)
- Place of birth: Buchholz, West Germany
- Height: 1.96 m (6 ft 5 in)
- Positions: Attacking midfielder; forward

Youth career
- 1988–1989: JSG Rosengarten
- 1989–1990: TuS Nenndorf
- 1990–1995: TSV Buchholz 08
- 1995–1998: Hamburger SV
- 1998–1999: MSV Hamburg
- 1999–2001: Hamburger SV

Senior career*
Years	Team	Apps	(Gls)
2001–2003	FC St. Pauli	25	(7)
2003–2004	Hamburger SV	4	(0)
2004	Hamburger SV II	6	(0)
2004–2018	Eintracht Frankfurt	336	(119)
2019	FC St. Pauli	16	(6)
2019–2020	Western Sydney Wanderers	12	(1)
Total		399	(133)

International career
2006	Germany U21	2	(0)
- * Club domestic league appearances and goals

Alexander Meier (born 17 January 1983) is a German former professional footballer who played as an attacking midfielder or forward. He was the 2014–15 Bundesliga top scorer with 19 goals in 26 games.

== Career ==
=== Early career ===
Meier began his professional career with FC St. Pauli in 2002. In the 2001–02 season, Meier appeared on matchdays 32 and 33. In the 2002–03 season, he became a regular fixture appearing in 23 league matches (scoring seven goals) and two cup matches. He signed his first professional contract on 10 April 2003. He moved to local rivals Hamburger SV in 2003; signing a three–year contract. Borussia Mönchengladbach also inquired about Meier. In his only season, he made four league appearances for the first team and six appearances for the reserve team.

=== Eintracht Frankfurt ===
==== 2004–2009 ====
Meier signed for Eintracht Frankfurt on 1 July 2004, and made his debut for the club in a 2. Bundesliga match against Alemannia Aachen, which finished in a 1–1 draw with him scoring the goal for Frankfurt. He then played in the next four matches without scoring. He then scored in two consecutive matchdays when Frankfurt defeated Rot-Weiß Oberhausen 6–2 and drew Rot-Weiss Essen 4–4. In between matchdays, he scored against Greuther Fürth in the DFB-Pokal. He would not score again until matchday 21 when he scored from the penalty spot against LR Ahlen. He scored three goals against Energie Cottbus on matchday 33 on 15 May 2005. He scored nine goals in 34 league matches and one goal in three cup matches.

He made his season debut on matchday one in a 4–1 loss to Bayer Leverkusen on 4 August 2005. His first goal of the season came on 14 October 2005 against MSV Duisburg in a 1–0 win. He then scored the following week on 21 October 2015 in a 6–3 win against 1. FC Köln. He then scored two goals against Schalke 04 in a 6–0 cup win on 25 October 2005. The scoring streak stopped on matchday 10 against Werder Bremen. The following week, Meier scored two goals against Arminia Bielefeld. He scored against Hamburger SV and Bayern Munich in back–to–back matchdays. however, Frankfurt lost to Hamburg 2–1 and Bayern Munich 5–2. Meier started, and played 90 minutes, in the cup final. Meier scored seven goals in 33 league matches and three goals in five cup matches.

Meier made his season debut in a 1–1 draw against Schalke on matchday one. He also made his European debut on matchday one of the UEFA Cup group stage in a 2–1 loss to Palermo. On 23 September 2006, in a 1–1 draw against VfB Stuttgart, Meier scored his first goal of the season. He also scored a goal in each of the following two weeks against Hamburg and Hannover 96. On 2 November 2006, in the UEFA Cup group stage, Meier was sent–off for a second bookable offence in a 1–1 draw against Celta de Vigo. He scored six goals in 29 league matches and one goal in four cup matches. He failed to score in any of his three UEFA Cup matches.

On 5 August 2007, Meier made his season debut in a 4–1 cup win against Union Berlin. He scored three goals in the match. He made his league debut on 11 August 2007 against Hertha BSC. He scored a goal each on matchdays two and three and two on matchday five. Meier came up with a knee injury against Borussia Dortmund in a cup match. Then on 4 March 2008, it was announced that Meier would have knee surgery. He had not played since October 2007 and finished the season with four goals in 11 league matches and three goals in two cup matches.

Meier made his season debut on matchday one on 17 August 2008 in a 2–0 loss to Hertha BSC, his second match on 20 September 2008 in a 1–0 loss to Schalke, and his third match on 23 September 2008 in a 2–1 cup loss to Hansa Rostock. He didn't play again until a 2–1 loss to Hertha BSC on matchday 18. He finished the season with three goals in 19 league matches. He didn't score in his only cup match.

==== 2014–2018 ====
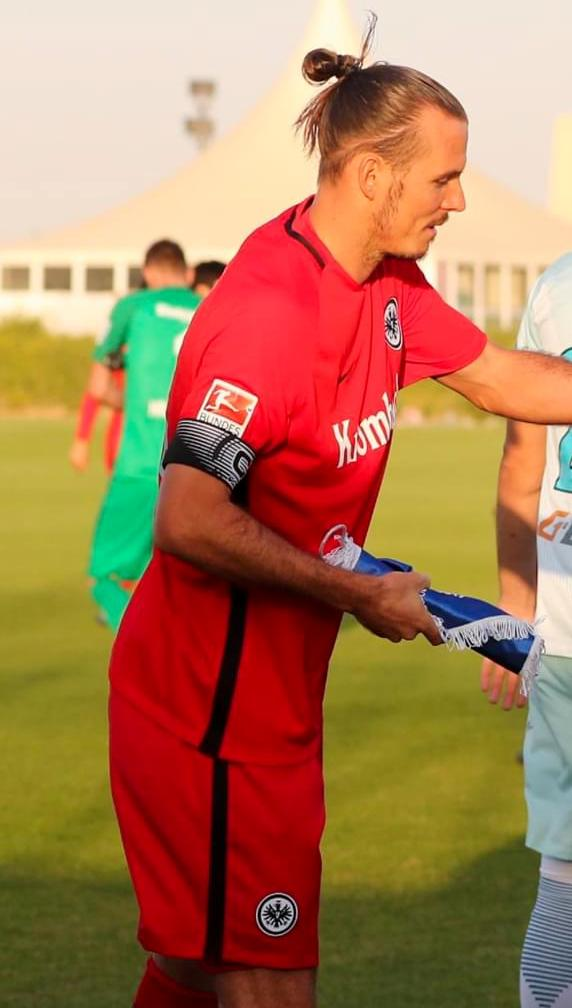
Meier with Frankfurt in 2017

Meier finished the 2014–15 season with 19 goals in 26 games despite his campaign being cut short by injury with seven games remaining. This made him the league's top scorer, with two more than Bayern Munich pair Arjen Robben and Robert Lewandowski.

In the 2015–16 season, Meier scored 12 goals in 19 games. In February 2016, Meier suffered a knee injury which caused him to pause until the end of the season.

On 14 July 2016, Eintracht Frankfurt confirmed that Meier has extended his contract until 30 June 2018. He finished the 2016–17 season with five goals in 25 appearances.

His only appearance during the 2017–18 season was on matchday 33 against Hamburger SV. He scored a goal in the match.

On 28 May 2018, Eintracht Frankfurt announced that the expiring contract of Alexander Meier would not be extended.

=== Return to FC St. Pauli ===
In January 2019, Meier returned to former club FC St. Pauli having agreed a contract until the end of the season. On 23 May 2019, the club announced that he would leave at the end of the season.

=== Western Sydney Wanderers ===
On 20 September 2019, Western Sydney Wanderers signed Meier as a marquee player. After 12 matches, on 17 January 2020, he left the club by mutual termination. Meier was having a poor season that was compounded by off-field problems including his family not being given visas to join him in Australia.

On 28 January, 11 days after leaving Western Sydney Wanderers, Meier announced his retirement as a player.

== Career statistics ==
Appearances and goals by club, season and competition
Club	Season	League			National cup		Europe		Other		Total	
Club	Season	Division	Apps	Goals	Apps	Goals	Apps	Goals	Apps	Goals	Apps	Goals
FC St. Pauli	2001–02	Bundesliga	2	0	0	0	—		—		2	0
FC St. Pauli	2002–03	2. Bundesliga	23	7	2	0	—		—		25	7
FC St. Pauli	Total		25	7	2	0	—		—		27	7
Hamburger SV	2003–04	Bundesliga	4	0	0	0	0	0	—		4	0
Hamburger SV II	2003–04	Regionalliga Nord	6	0	—		—		—		6	0
Eintracht Frankfurt	2004–05	2. Bundesliga	34	9	3	1	—		—		37	10
Eintracht Frankfurt	2005–06	Bundesliga	33	7	5	3	—		—		38	10
Eintracht Frankfurt	2006–07	Bundesliga	29	6	4	1	3 (Note: Appearances in UEFA Cup)	0	—		36	7
Eintracht Frankfurt	2007–08	Bundesliga	11	4	2	3	—		—		13	7
Eintracht Frankfurt	2008–09	Bundesliga	19	3	1	0	—		—		20	3
Eintracht Frankfurt	2009–10	Bundesliga	34	10	3	2	—		—		37	12
Eintracht Frankfurt	2010–11	Bundesliga	24	2	3	0	—		—		27	2
Eintracht Frankfurt	2011–12	2. Bundesliga	32	17	2	0	—		—		34	17
Eintracht Frankfurt	2012–13	Bundesliga	31	16	1	0	—		—		32	16
Eintracht Frankfurt	2013–14	Bundesliga	22	8	2	0	6 (Note: Appearances in UEFA Europa League)	7	—		30	15
Eintracht Frankfurt	2014–15	Bundesliga	26	19	1	1	—		—		27	20
Eintracht Frankfurt	2015–16	Bundesliga	19	12	1	0	—		2 (Note: Appearances in Bundesliga relegation play-offs)	0	22	12
Eintracht Frankfurt	2016–17	Bundesliga	21	5	4	0	—		—		25	5
Eintracht Frankfurt	2017–18	Bundesliga	1	1	0	0	—		—		1	1
Eintracht Frankfurt	Total		336	119	32	11	9	7	2	0	379	137
FC St. Pauli	2018–19	2. Bundesliga	16	6	0	0	—		—		16	6
Western Sydney Wanderers	2019–20	A-League	12	1	0	0	—		—		12	1
Career total			399	133	34	11	9	7	2	0	444	151

== Honours ==
Eintracht Frankfurt

- DFB-Pokal: 2017–18; runner-up: 2005–06, 2016–17
- 2. Bundesliga runner-up: 2011–12

Individual

- 2. Bundesliga top goalscorer: 2011–12
- Bundesliga top goalscorer: 2014–15
