= Patrick Ochs =

German footballer

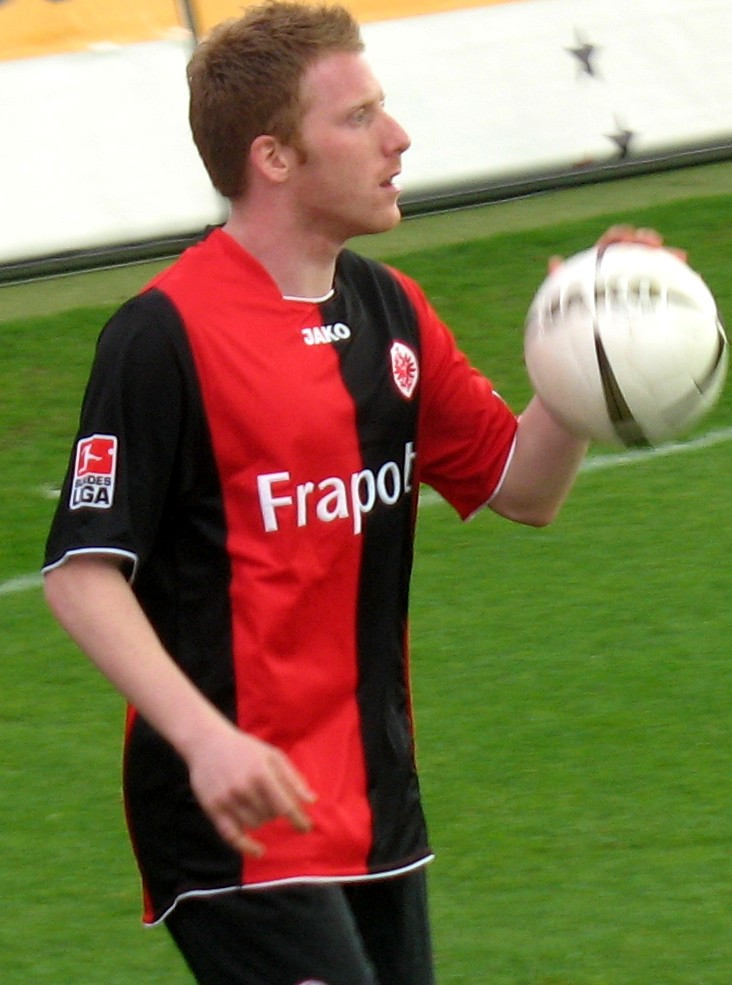
- Patrick Ochs playing for Frankfurt in 2008

Personal information
- Full name: Patrick Ochs
- Date of birth: 14 May 1984 (age 42)
- Place of birth: Frankfurt, West Germany
- Height: 1.79 m (5 ft 10 1/2 in)
- Positions: Right back; right winger

Youth career
- 1989–1991: Germania Enkheim
- 1991–2002: Eintracht Frankfurt
- 2002–2003: Bayern Munich

Senior career*
| Years | Team | Apps | (Gls) |
| 2003–2004 | Bayern Munich II | 400 | (1) |
| 2004–2011 | Eintracht Frankfurt | 202 | (5) |
| 2011–2015 | VfL Wolfsburg | 30 | (0) |
| 2012–2013 | → 1899 Hoffenheim (loan) | 12 | (0) |
| 2016–2017 | FSV Frankfurt | 24 | (0) |
| Total | | 293 | (6) |

International career
| 2005–2006 | Germany U21 | 9 | (0) |
- * Club domestic league appearances and goals

Patrick Ochs (born 14 May 1984) is a German former footballer who played as a right-back or right winger. Ochs spent the majority of his professional career with Eintracht Frankfurt.

== Club career ==
In the 2009–10 season, Eintracht Frankfurt manager Michael Skibbe switched Ochs from his usual right back position to play on the wing using his pace to give the offence a boost.

In 2015, after his contract had expired, he left VfL Wolfsburg. During his four-year spell there, he was loaned for one season to 1899 Hoffenheim. Finally he could not establish himself in Wolfsburg, during the last season he even did not earn a single cap for the first team in all competitions.

In summer 2016 Ochs joined 3. Liga side FSV Frankfurt. In April 2018, he suffered a severe knee injury tearing his cruciate ligament as well as damaging his anterior ligament and meniscus.

== International career ==
He represented the German under-21 team at UEFA U-21 Championship 2006.

== Career statistics ==
Appearances and goals by club, season and competition
| Club | Season | League | | | DFB-Pokal | | Other | | Total | |
| Club | Season | Division | Apps | Goals | Apps | Goals | Apps | Goals | Apps | Goals |
|---|---|---|---|---|---|---|---|---|---|---|
| Bayern Munich II | 2003–04 | Regionalliga Süd | 25 | 1 | — | | 0 | 0 | 25 | 1 |
| Eintracht Frankfurt | 2004–05 | 2. Bundesliga | 28 | 1 | 2 | 1 | 0 | 0 | 30 | 2 |
| Eintracht Frankfurt | 2005–06 | Bundesliga | 28 | 0 | 4 | 1 | 0 | 0 | 32 | 1 |
| Eintracht Frankfurt | 2006–07 | Bundesliga | 30 | 1 | 4 | 0 | 6 (Note: Appearance(s) in UEFA Cup.) | 0 | 40 | 1 |
| Eintracht Frankfurt | 2007–08 | Bundesliga | 29 | 0 | 1 | 0 | 0 | 0 | 30 | 0 |
| Eintracht Frankfurt | 2008–09 | Bundesliga | 30 | 0 | 2 | 0 | 0 | 0 | 32 | 0 |
| Eintracht Frankfurt | 2009–10 | Bundesliga | 28 | 1 | 3 | 0 | 0 | 0 | 31 | 1 |
| Eintracht Frankfurt | 2010–11 | Bundesliga | 29 | 2 | 3 | 1 | 0 | 0 | 32 | 3 |
| Eintracht Frankfurt | Total | | 202 | 5 | 19 | 3 | 6 | 0 | 227 | 8 |
| VfL Wolfsburg | 2011–12 | Bundesliga | 13 | 0 | 1 | 0 | 0 | 0 | 14 | 0 |
| VfL Wolfsburg | 2012–13 | Bundesliga | 0 | 0 | 0 | 0 | 0 | 0 | 0 | 0 |
| VfL Wolfsburg | 2013–14 | Bundesliga | 17 | 0 | 2 | 0 | 0 | 0 | 19 | 0 |
| VfL Wolfsburg | 2014–15 | Bundesliga | 0 | 0 | 0 | 0 | 0 | 0 | 0 | 0 |
| VfL Wolfsburg | Total | | 30 | 0 | 3 | 0 | 0 | 0 | 33 | 0 |
| VfL Wolfsburg II | 2012–13 | Regionalliga Nord | 1 | 0 | — | | 0 | 0 | 1 | 0 |
| VfL Wolfsburg II | 2014–15 | Regionalliga Nord | 4 | 1 | — | | 0 | 0 | 4 | 1 |
| VfL Wolfsburg II | Total | | 5 | 1 | 0 | 0 | 0 | 0 | 5 | 1 |
| TSG 1899 Hoffenheim (loan) | 2012–13 | Bundesliga | 12 | 0 | 0 | 0 | 0 | 0 | 12 | 0 |
| FSV Frankfurt | 2016–17 | 3. Liga | 24 | 0 | — | | 0 | 0 | 24 | 0 |
| Career total | | | 298 | 7 | 22 | 3 | 6 | 0 | 326 | 10 |

== Honours ==
Eintracht Frankfurt

- DFB-Pokal Runner-up: 2005–06

VfL Wolfsburg

- DFB-Pokal: 2014–15
