= Markus Pröll =

German footballer

Personal information
- Full name: Markus Pröll
- Date of birth: 28 August 1979 (age 47)
- Place of birth: Rheinbach, West Germany
- Height: 1.88 m (6 ft 2 in)
- Position: Goalkeeper

Youth career
- 1985–1991: VfR Flamersheim
- 1993–1995: Eintracht Lommersum
- 1995–1998: 1. FC Köln

Senior career*
Years	Team	Apps	(Gls)
1998–2003	1. FC Köln	111	(0)
2003–2010	Eintracht Frankfurt	93	(0)
2011	Panionios	1	(0)
Total		205	(0)

International career
2000–2001	Germany U-21	6	(0)
- * Club domestic league appearances and goals

Markus Pröll (born 28 August 1979) is a German former professional footballer who played as a goalkeeper. During his career, he played for 1. FC Köln and Eintracht Frankfurt in Germany and Panionios in Greece.

== Club career ==
Pröll was born in Rheinbach. He started his professional career with 1. FC Köln before moving to Frankfurt for the 2003–04 season.

He was elected by the German football magazine kicker as the Bundesliga's best goalkeeper of the first half of the 2006–07 season. Unfortunately he hardly could contend this title as he suffered of many injuries.

== Career statistics ==
Appearances and goals by club, season and competition
Club	Season	League			National cup		Europe		Total	
Club	Season	Division	Apps	Goals	Apps	Goals	Apps	Goals	Apps	Goals
1. FC Köln	1998–99	2. Bundesliga	22	0	0	0	—		22	0
1. FC Köln	1999–2000	2. Bundesliga	34	0	3	0	—		37	0
1. FC Köln	2000–01	Bundesliga	29	0	1	0	—		30	0
1. FC Köln	2001–02	Bundesliga	24	0	4	0	—		28	0
1. FC Köln	2002–03	2. Bundesliga	2	0	4	0	—		6	0
1. FC Köln	Total		111	0	12	0	—		123	0
Eintracht Frankfurt	2003–04	Bundesliga	3	0	0	0	—		3	0
Eintracht Frankfurt	2004–05	2. Bundesliga	33	0	3	0	—		36	0
Eintracht Frankfurt	2005–06	Bundesliga	2	0	0	0	—		2	0
Eintracht Frankfurt	2006–07	Bundesliga	14	0	2	0	5	0	21	0
Eintracht Frankfurt	2007–08	Bundesliga	23	0	2	0	—		25	0
Eintracht Frankfurt	2008–09	Bundesliga	18	0	0	0	—		18	0
Eintracht Frankfurt	2009–10	Bundesliga	0	0	0	0	—		0	0
Eintracht Frankfurt	Total		93	0	7	0	5	0	105	0
Panionios	2010–11	Super League Greece	1	0	—		—		1	0
Career total			205	0	19	0	5	0	229	0
