= Friedhelm Funkel =

German football player and manager (born 1953)

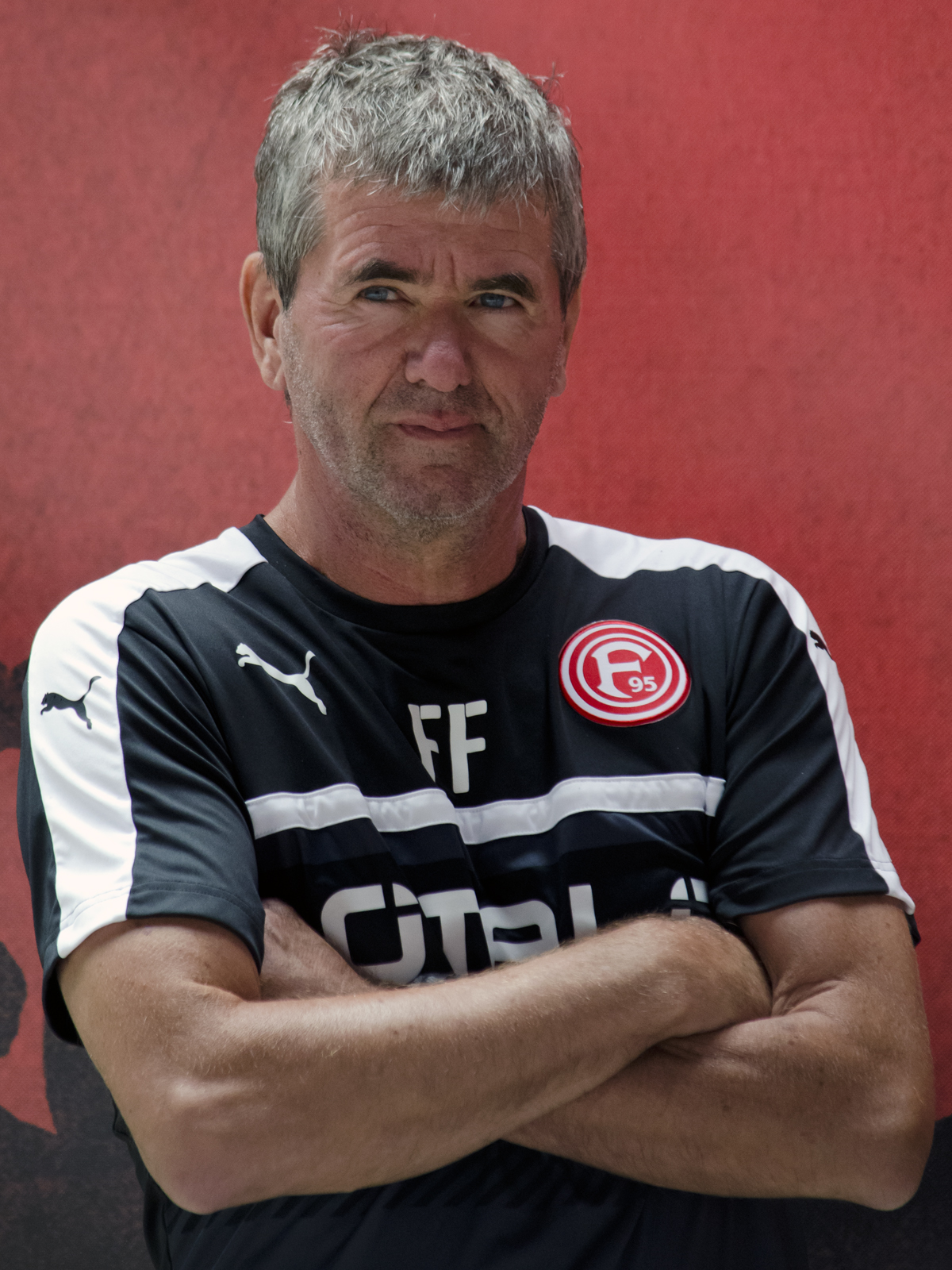
- Funkel with Fortuna Düsseldorf in 2016

Personal information
- Date of birth: 10 December 1953 (age 72)
- Place of birth: Neuss, West Germany
- Height: 1.81 m (5 ft 11 in)
- Position: Midfielder

Youth career
- 1964–1972: VfR Neuss

Senior career*
Years	Team	Apps	(Gls)
1972–1973	VfR Neuss	28	(15)
1973–1980	Bayer Uerdingen	238	(91)
1980–1983	1. FC Kaiserslautern	66	(24)
1983–1990	Bayer Uerdingen	189	(40)
Total		521	(170)

International career
1981	West Germany B	4	(1)

Managerial career
- 1989–1990: VfR Neuss
- 1991–1996: Bayer Uerdingen
- 1996–2000: MSV Duisburg
- 2000–2001: Hansa Rostock
- 2002–2003: 1. FC Köln
- 2004–2009: Eintracht Frankfurt
- 2009–2010: Hertha BSC
- 2010–2011: VfL Bochum
- 2011–2012: Alemannia Aachen
- 2013–2014: 1860 Munich
- 2016–2020: Fortuna Düsseldorf
- 2021: 1. FC Köln
- 2024: 1. FC Kaiserslautern
- 2025: 1. FC Köln
- * Club domestic league appearances and goals

Friedhelm Funkel (born 10 December 1953) is a German football manager and former player. He was most recently the head coach Bundesliga club of 1. FC Köln.

== Coaching career ==
=== MSV Duisburg ===
Funkel was manager of MSV Duisburg between 13 May 1996 and 24 March 2000. During his tenure, Funkel guided the club through one of its more stable periods in the Bundesliga era. In his first full season in charge, he achieved promotion to the Bundesliga by finishing second in the 1995–96 2. Bundesliga campaign.

One of the highlights of his spell at Duisburg came in the 1997–98 Bundesliga season, when the team finished in 9th place, their best league position in decades. That same season, Funkel led Duisburg to the final of the DFB-Pokal, where they were narrowly defeated 2–1 by Bayern Munich. His tactical discipline and focus on team cohesion were widely credited for the club's success during this period.

Funkel's tenure came to an end in March 2000, following a string of disappointing results. He finished with an overall record of 56 wins, 47 draws, and 59 losses. Despite the mixed results toward the end, Funkel's time at Duisburg is often remembered as one of the more competitive and consistent phases in the club's modern history.

=== F.C. Hansa Rostock ===
He was manager of Hansa Rostock from 19 September 2000 to 1 December 2001. He finished with a record of 13 wins, 10 draws, and 22 losses.

=== 1. FC Köln ===
He was manager of 1. FC Köln from 14 February 2002 to 30 October 2003. He finished with a record of 29 wins, 15 draws, and 19 losses.

=== Eintracht Frankfurt ===
Funkel coached Eintracht Frankfurt from 2004 to 2009. He was subsequently released from his contract on 1 July 2009. He led the club into the Bundesliga in his first season in charge. One year later, he and the team avoided relegation and surprisingly reached the DFB-Pokal final, which eventually sent them to the UEFA Cup.

Tied with Erich Ribbeck, Funkel holds the record for the longest tenure at Eintracht, with five full seasons. He finished with a record of 70 wins, 50 draws, and 74 losses.

=== Hertha BSC ===
On 3 October 2009, Hertha BSC introduced Funkel as their new head coach after having fired Lucien Favre. After Hertha was relegated, Funkel and the club mutually agreed to not extend his contract. He finished with a record of seven wins, 10 draws, and 16 losses.

=== VfL Bochum ===
On 22 May 2010, he was named new coach of VfL Bochum. His first match was a 3–0 loss to Kickers Offenbach in the first round of the German Cup. He got sacked on 14 September 2011. His final match was a 2–1 loss to Dynamo Dresden. He finished with a record of 21 wins, eight draws, and 16 losses.

=== Alemannia Aachen ===
On 20 September 2011, Funkel took over the job as manager of Alemannia Aachen. Funkel was dismissed of his job on 1 April 2012, after a streak of five consecutive losses. He finished with a record of three wins, eight draws, and nine losses in 20 matches.

=== TSV 1860 Munich ===
On 7 September 2013, he was named new coach of 1860 Munich. His first match in–charge was a 0–0 draw against VfR Aalen on 13 September 2013. On 2 April 2014, 1860 Munich announced that Funkel is going to leave the club after the season because of "different conceptual views on the orientation in sport." However, 1860 München sacked Funkel on 6 April 2014 after losing to Karlsruher SC 3–0 at home earlier in the day. He finished with a record of seven wins, eight draws, and nine losses in 24 matches.

=== Fortuna Düsseldorf ===
Funkel was appointed as the new head coach of Fortuna Düsseldorf on 14 March 2016. He was sacked on 29 January 2020 after six losses in his last eight matches.

=== Return to 1. FC Köln ===
Funkel was reappointed as the new head coach of 1. FC Köln on 11 April 2021 for the remainder of the 2020–21 season.

=== 1. FC Kaiserslautern ===
On 14 February 2024, he was signed by 1. FC Kaiserslautern. His first match took place on 18 February 2024 against 1. FC Nürnberg which ended 1–1. One game before the season ended, the club announced that his contract will end on 30 June 2024.

=== Second return to 1. FC Köln ===
In May 2025, he returned to Köln for a second time. He eventually led the club to achieve the 2024–25 2. Bundesliga title and secure promotion back to the Bundesliga. However, he decided to depart the club at the end of the season.

== Personal life ==
Funkel has two children. He is the older brother of Wolfgang Funkel.

== Career statistics ==
=== Club ===
Club	Season	League			DFB-Pokal		Europe		Total		Ref.
Club	Season	Division	Apps	Goals	Apps	Goals	Apps	Goals	Apps	Goals	Ref.
VfR Neuss	1972–73	Verbandsliga Niederrhein	28	15	—		—		28	15	
Bayer Uerdingen	1973–74	Regionalliga West	21	6	—		—		21	6	
Bayer Uerdingen	1974–75	2. Bundesliga	38	13	2	0	—		40	13	
Bayer Uerdingen	1975–76	Bundesliga	31	5	0	0	—		31	5	
Bayer Uerdingen	1976–77	2. Bundesliga	38	17	6	1	—		44	18	
Bayer Uerdingen	1977–78	2. Bundesliga	38	25	2	0	—		40	25	
Bayer Uerdingen	1978–79	2. Bundesliga	38	11	5	5	—		43	16	
Bayer Uerdingen	1979–80	Bundesliga	34	14	3	2	—		37	14	
Bayer Uerdingen	Totals		238	91	18	8	—		256	99	—
1. FC Kaiserslautern	1980–81	Bundesliga	31	13	7	3	4 (Note: Appearances in the UEFA Cup.)	2	42	18	
1. FC Kaiserslautern	1981–82	Bundesliga	24	10	1	0	10	5	35	15	
1. FC Kaiserslautern	1982–83	Bundesliga	11	1	1	0	1	0	13	1	
1. FC Kaiserslautern	Totals		66	24	9	3	15	7	90	34	—
Bayer Uerdingen	1983–84	Bundesliga	33	15	5	0	—		38	15	
Bayer Uerdingen	1984–85	Bundesliga	31	11	4	1	—		35	12	
Bayer Uerdingen	1985–86	Bundesliga	30	2	1	0	8 (Note: Appearances in the UEFA Cup Winners' Cup.)	3	39	5	
Bayer Uerdingen	1986–87	Bundesliga	29	8	3	0	5	1	37	9	
Bayer Uerdingen	1987–88	Bundesliga	27	2	4	0	—		31	2	
Bayer Uerdingen	1988–89	Bundesliga	30	2	2	0	—		32	2	
Bayer Uerdingen	1989–90	Bundesliga	9	0	0	0	—		9	0	
Bayer Uerdingen	Totals		189	40	19	1	13	4	221	45	—
Career totals			521	170	46	12	28	11	595	193	—

=== Managerial ===
As of 18 May 2025

Team	From	To	Record					
Team	From	To	G	W	D	L	Win %	Ref.
Bayer Uerdingen	3 June 1991	13 May 1996	196	64	55	77	32.65	
MSV Duisburg	13 May 1996	19 March 2000	162	56	47	59	34.57	
Hansa Rostock	19 September 2000	1 December 2001	45	13	10	22	28.89	
1. FC Köln	14 February 2002	30 October 2003	63	29	15	19	46.03	
Eintracht Frankfurt	1 July 2004	30 June 2009	194	70	50	74	36.08	
Hertha BSC	3 October 2009	30 June 2010	33	7	10	16	21.21	
VfL Bochum	22 May 2010	14 September 2011	45	21	8	16	46.67	
Alemannia Aachen	19 September 2011	1 April 2012	20	3	8	9	15.00	
1860 Munich	7 September 2013	6 April 2014	24	7	8	9	29.17	
Fortuna Düsseldorf	14 March 2016	29 January 2020	138	55	28	55	39.86	
1. FC Köln	11 April 2021	30 June 2021	8	4	1	3	50.00	
1. FC Kaiserslautern	14 February 2024	30 June 2024	15	6	3	6	40.00	
1. FC Köln	5 May 2025	23 May 2025	2	2	0	0	100.00	
Total			945	337	243	365	35.66	—

== Honours ==
=== Player ===
Bayer Uerdingen

- DFB-Pokal: 1984–85

=== Manager ===
1. FC Köln

- 2. Bundesliga: 2024–25
