= Marcel Titsch-Rivero =

German footballer

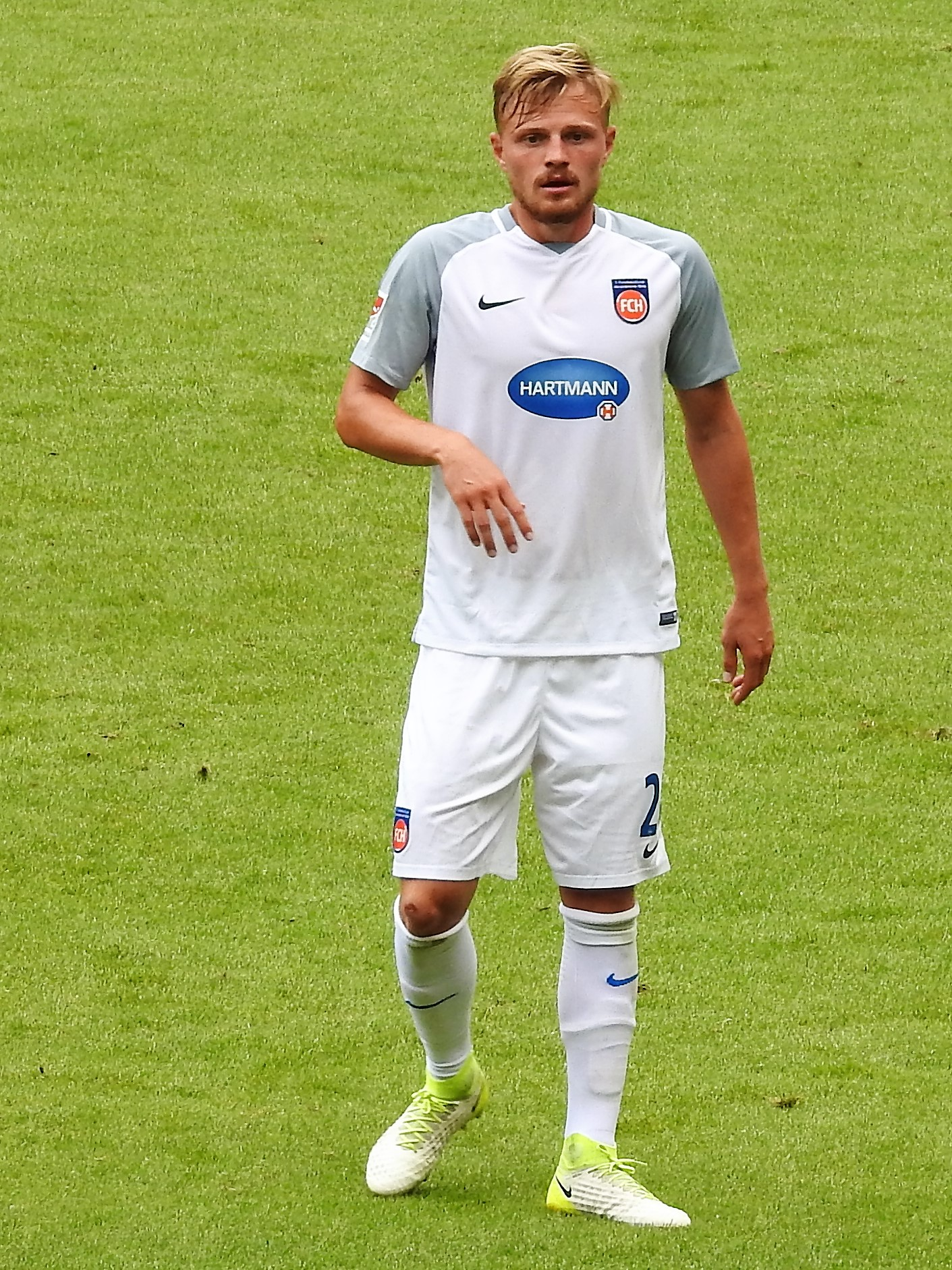
- Titsch-Rivero playing for 1. FC Heidenheim in 2017

Personal information
- Date of birth: 2 November 1989 (age 36)
- Place of birth: Frankfurt am Main, West Germany
- Height: 1.80 m (5 ft 11 in)
- Position: Midfielder

Youth career
- SpVgg Neu-Isenburg
- –2005: SG Rosenhöhe
- 2005–2009: Eintracht Frankfurt

Senior career*
Years	Team	Apps	(Gls)
2008–2012	Eintracht Frankfurt II	90	(15)
2009–2012	Eintracht Frankfurt	2	(0)
2012–2018	1. FC Heidenheim	163	(7)
2018–2020	Wehen Wiesbaden	43	(2)
2020–2022	Hallescher FC	52	(3)
- * Club domestic league appearances and goals as of 14 May 2022

Marcel Titsch-Rivero (born 2 November 1989) is a German professional footballer who plays as a midfielder.

== Career ==
Titsch-Rivero debuted in the Bundesliga for Eintracht Frankfurt in a match at 1899 Hoffenheim on 12 December 2009.

== Personal life ==
He is of Spanish origin.
