= Christoph Preuß =

German footballer

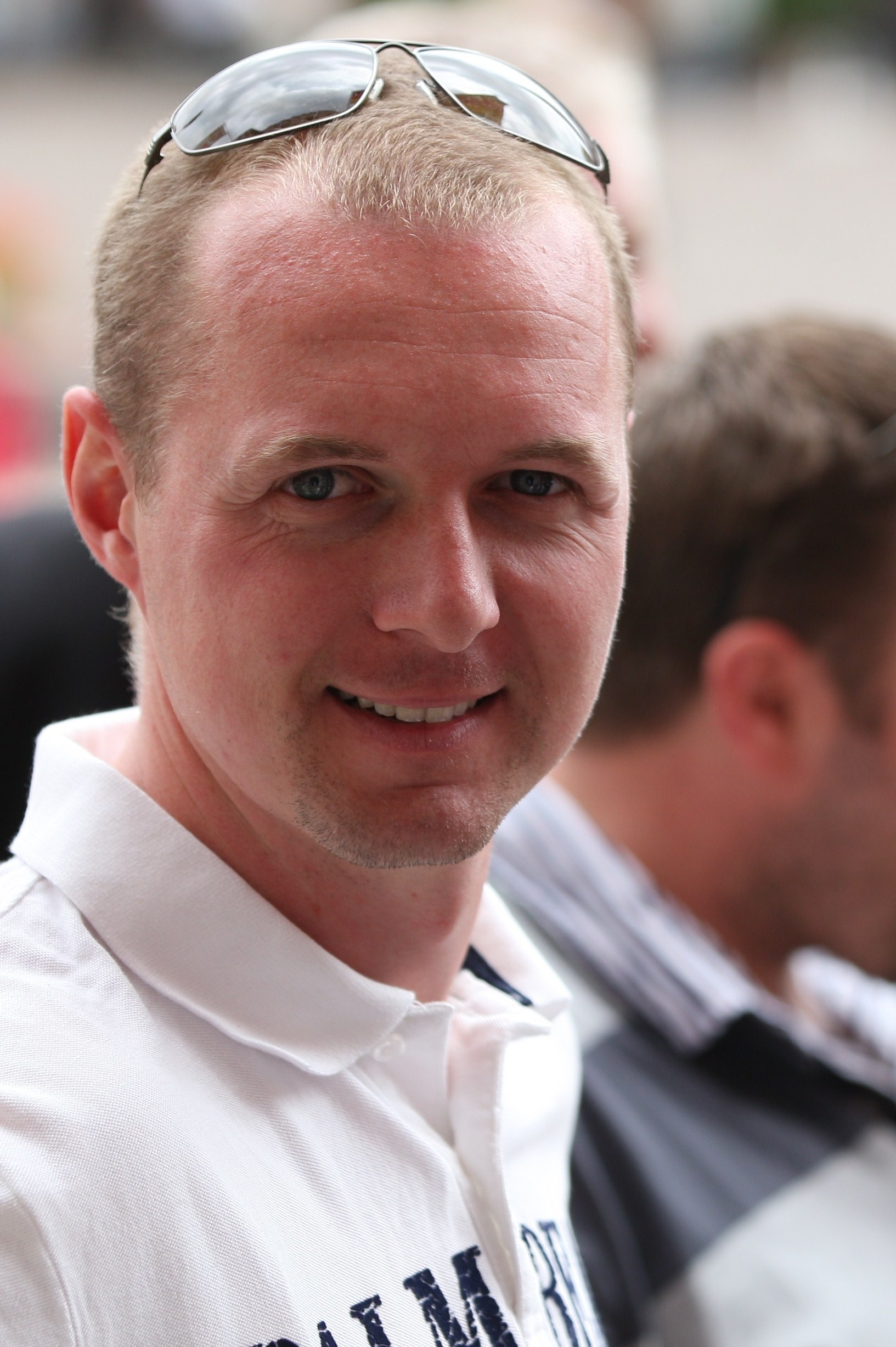
- Preuß in 2011

Personal information
- Date of birth: 4 July 1981 (age 45)
- Place of birth: Gießen, West Germany
- Height: 1.81 m (5 ft 11 in)
- Positions: Defender; defensive midfielder

Youth career
- 1986–1997: TSV Großen-Linden
- 1997–2000: Eintracht Frankfurt

Senior career*
Years	Team	Apps	(Gls)
2000–2004	Eintracht Frankfurt	81	(8)
2002–2003	→ Bayer Leverkusen (loan)	4	(0)
2004–2005	VfL Bochum	30	(2)
2005–2010	Eintracht Frankfurt	47	(2)
Total		162	(12)

International career
2001	Germany U-20	4	(0)
2002–2004	Germany U-21	23	(0)
2002–2005	Germany Team 2006	3	(0)
- * Club domestic league appearances and goals

Christoph Preuß (born 4 July 1981) is a German former professional footballer who played as a defender or defensive midfielder.

== Career ==
Preuß was born in Gießen, Hesse, and raised in the Hessian town of Linden. He played for local side TSV Großen-Linden, before moving to Eintracht Frankfurt in the 2005–06 season.

In the 2006–07 campaign he was injured for almost the whole first half of the season. On 17 March 2007, he secured a 1–0 victory against Bayern Munich with a spectacular bicycle kick goal which earned Preuß the Goal of the Month award and finished second in the Goal of the Year poll. Later, he was plagued with injuries. After coming back from a two-year injury he appeared three times in the Bundesliga for Eintracht Frankfurt but was injured once again. On 28 January 2010, he announced his retirement from professional football.

== International career ==
He was an under-17 national and played for all DFB youth teams up to the under-21 team.
