= Ioannis Amanatidis =

Greek executive, coach and retired association football player (born 1981)

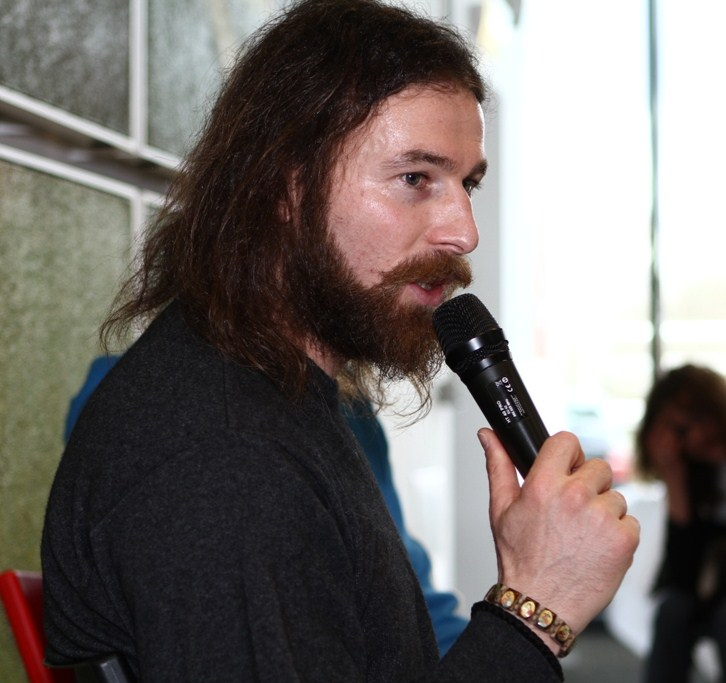

Personal information
- Date of birth: 3 December 1981 (age 44)
- Place of birth: Kozani, Greece
- Height: 1.83 m (6 ft 0 in)
- Positions: Striker; winger

Youth career
- 1991–1995: Stuttgarter SC
- 1995–1999: VfB Stuttgart

Senior career*
Years	Team	Apps	(Gls)
1999–2004	VfB Stuttgart	35	(6)
2000–2002	→ Greuther Fürth (loan)	42	(12)
2004	→ Eintracht Frankfurt (loan)	15	(6)
2004–2005	1. FC Kaiserslautern	23	(6)
2005–2011	Eintracht Frankfurt	140	(42)
Total		255	(72)

International career^{‡}
2000–2003	Greece U21	15	(2)
2002–2009	Greece	35	(3)

Managerial career
- 2014–2016: Iraklis U19
- 2016: Iraklis (caretaker)
- 2019–2020: St. Gallen (assistant)
- 2020: PAOK (assistant)
- * Club domestic league appearances and goals as of June 1, 2026 ‡ National team caps and goals as of June 1, 2026

Ioannis Amanatidis (Greek: Ιωάννης Αμανατίδης, Greek pronunciation: [io'anis amanaˈtiðis]; born 3 December 1981) is a Greek football manager and former player. As a player, Amanatidis played as a striker and winger, and was active professionally in Germany. He also represented Greece at senior international level.

== Club career ==
Amanatidis was born in Kozani, Greece. His family immigrated when he was nine years old to Stuttgart where he joined Stuttgarter SC. Two years later he went to VfB Stuttgart academy. In 2002, he started his Bundesliga career having already played on loan for Greuther Fürth in lower divisions. After a clash with then VfB Stuttgart coach Felix Magath over his lack of opportunities he was given on loan to struggling Bundesliga side Eintracht Frankfurt where he impressed despite the eventual relegation of the team to second division.

In the summer he signed on free to 1. FC Kaiserslautern, but after only one season he signed again to the newly promoted Eintracht Frankfurt side and was instrumental in the team's attack scoring regularly and eventually becoming the captain of the team in the 2007–08 season.

In April 2008, it was reported that the captain of Eintracht has agreed to an extension of his contract till 2012 with the club.

On 18 July 2011, Amanatidis officially announced his retirement from professional football. He finished his career having 325 appearances (98 goals, 24 assists) in all competitions.

== International career ==
Amanatidis earned his first cap for Greece against the Republic of Ireland in November 2002. However, he was left out of the victorious Euro 2004 squad.

He was selected in the final squad for the 2005 FIFA Confederations Cup and featured in the matches against Brazil and Mexico.

On 9 August 2010, Amanatidis decided to retire from international football. He stated, that "there are many strange and suspicious choices, some players are always in the starting eleven and many of us know the reasons of the selection, but if I say more, there are going to be many reactions.", Amanatidis stated.

Amanatidis scored the winning goal in a match against Turkeyin Istanbul, which is often noted as a significant moment in his international career. He was also part of the final squad for UEFA Euro 2008 and appeared in all three group-stage matches against Sweden, Spain, and Russia.

== Μanagerial career ==
After his retirement from football, in 2014, Amanatidis joined Iraklis U20 as a reserve team head coach. In October 2016, he acted as caretaker manager of the first team. On 15 January 2019, Amanatidis was presented as the new assistant manager of Swiss Super League side FC St. Gallen. On 3 August 2020, he was presented as Abel Ferreira's new assistant manager at PAOK.

== Career statistics ==
No.	Date	Venue	Opponent	Score	Result	Competition
1.	17 October 2007	Istanbul, Turkey	Turkey	0–1	Win	UEFA Euro 2008 qualifier
2.	17 November 2007	Athens, Greece	Malta	5–0	Win	UEFA Euro 2008 qualifier
3.	24 May 2008	Budapest, Hungary	Hungary	3–2	Loss	Friendly Match

== Honours ==
=== VfB Stuttgart ===
- UEFA Intertoto Cup: 2002

=== Eintracht Frankfurt ===
- DFB-Pokal runner-up: 2005–06
