= Christoph Spycher =

Swiss footballer (born 1978)

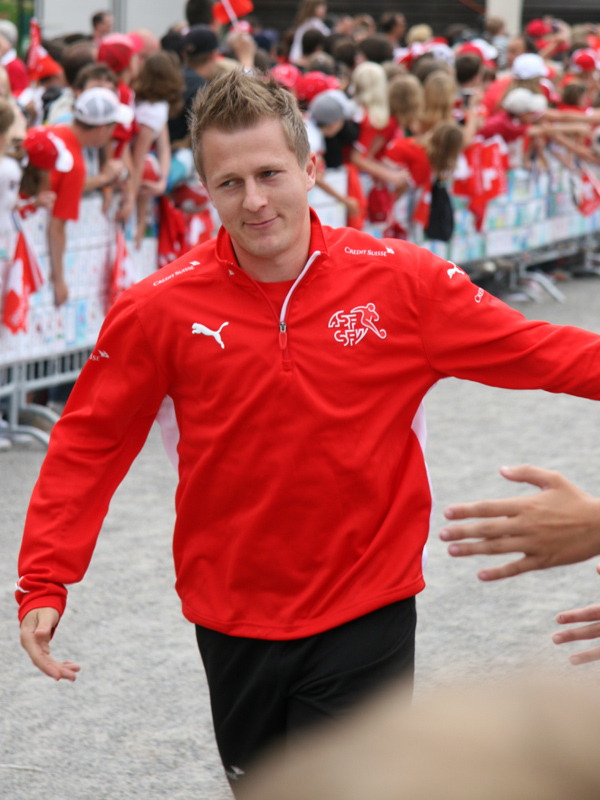
- Spycher in June 2008

Personal information
- Full name: Christoph Spycher
- Date of birth: 30 March 1978 (age 48)
- Place of birth: Wolhusen, Switzerland
- Height: 1.74 m (5 ft 9 in)
- Position: Left-back

Youth career
- 1986–1992: FC Sternenberg
- 1992–1997: SC Bümpliz 78

Senior career*
Years	Team	Apps	(Gls)
1997–1999	FC Münsingen	32	(2)
1999–2001	Luzern	66	(0)
2001–2005	Grasshoppers	103	(6)
2005–2010	Eintracht Frankfurt	120	(0)
2010–2014	Young Boys	99	(7)
Total		420	(15)

International career
2003–2010	Switzerland	46	(0)
- * Club domestic league appearances and goals

Christoph Spycher (born 30 March 1978) is a Swiss former professional footballer who played as a left-back. He spent most of his playing career in Switzerland, apart from a five-year spell with German club Eintracht Frankfurt. Spycher also represented the Switzerland national football team at two UEFA European Championships and the 2006 FIFA World Cup.

Spycher is currently chief sports officer of BSC Young Boys.

== Career ==
Born in Wolhusen, Spycher played for Eintracht Frankfurt in the Bundesliga for five years, mainly as a full-back.

He had a trial with Rangers FC in June 2004.

In the 2007–08 season he was vice captain at Eintracht. He was appointed captain of the team in July 2009. In May 2010, it was reported that he joined BSC Young Boys.

== International career ==
He represented the national team at 2008 UEFA Euro, where the team showed good performance in the tournament, achieving the best result at the time.

On 18 May 2010, Spycher was forced to pull out of Switzerland's 2010 FIFA World Cup squad because of a knee injury and also retired from international football.

== Honours ==
Grasshopper Club Zürich

- Nationalliga A: 2002–03

Eintracht Frankfurt

- DFB-Pokal runner-up: 2005–06
