= Aleksandar Vasoski =

Macedonian footballer and manager (born 1979)

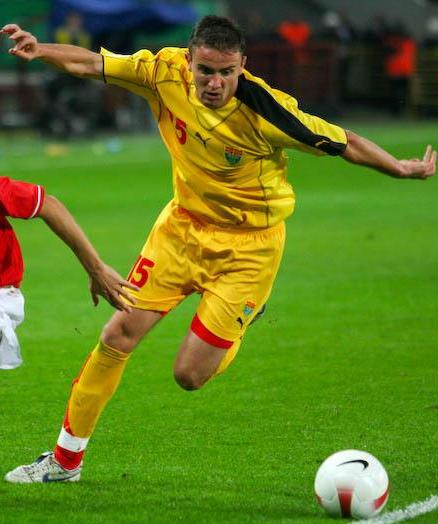
- Vasoski playing for Macedonia in 2007

Personal information
- Date of birth: 21 November 1979 (age 46)
- Place of birth: Skopje, SFR Yugoslavia
- Height: 1.82 m (6 ft 0 in)
- Position: Centre-back

Team information
- Current team: Sileks (manager)

Youth career
- 1989–1994: Metalurg Skopje
- 1994–1998: Skopje

Senior career*
Years	Team	Apps	(Gls)
1999	Vardar	5	(0)
2000–2001	Cementarnica	41	(0)
2001–2004	Vardar	91	(6)
2005–2011	Eintracht Frankfurt	98	(3)
Total		235	(9)

International career
2000–2008	Macedonia	34	(2)

Managerial career
- 2018–2020: Vardar
- 2020–2022: Akademija Pandev
- 2022: Sarajevo
- 2022–2023: Akademija Pandev
- 2023: Vardar
- 2023–: Sileks
- * Club domestic league appearances and goals

Aleksandar Vasoski (Macedonian: Александар Васоски; born 21 November 1979) is a Macedonian professional football manager and former player who is the current manager of Macedonian First Football League club Sileks.

== Club career ==
Born in Skopje, Vasoski played for local clubs, most notably Vardar and Cementarnica. He played for Bundesliga outfit Eintracht Frankfurt from 2005 to 2011. After parting with Frankfurt, Vasoski decided to retire from playing due to numerous knee injuries.

== International career ==
Vasoski made his senior debut for the Macedonia national team in a July 2000 friendly match against Azerbaijan and has earned a total of 34 caps, scoring 2 goals. His final international was a November 2008 friendly against Montenegro.

== Managerial career ==
=== Early career ===
Vasoski previously worked as the youth team manager and coordinator of Metalurg Skopje and Vardar. On 16 July 2018, he became the new manager of Vardar, winning the Macedonian First League in the 2019–20 season with the club. Vasoski left Vardar in December 2020. He then worked as manager of Akademija Pandev from 2020 to 2022.

=== Sarajevo ===
On 8 January 2022, Bosnian Premier League club Sarajevo appointed Vasoski as manager. On 10 January 2022, he was officially confirmed as Sarajevo manager, signing a six-month contract, with an option to stay at the club until June 2023. Vasoski was victorious in his first Bosnian Premier League game as Sarajevo manager, winning 2–0 away against Leotar on 26 February 2022.

On 5 March 2022, he lost his first Sarajevo derby as a manager in a 2–0 defeat to Željezničar. On 10 April 2022, Vasoski managed Sarajevo to a 6–0 win against Rudar Prijedor, the club's biggest league win of the season. Following a series of poor results, which culminated with a 1–1 draw against rivals Željezničar, he resigned as manager on 10 May 2022.

== Managerial statistics ==
As of 11 November 2023

Managerial record by team and tenure
Team	From	To	Record							
Team	From	To	G	W	D	L	GF	GA	GD	Win %
Vardar	16 July 2018	21 December 2020	77	36	26	15	100	61	+39	46.75
Akademija Pandev	25 December 2020	8 January 2022	32	16	8	8	45	31	+14	50.00
Sarajevo	10 January 2022	10 May 2022	15	7	4	4	24	11	+13	46.67
Akademija Pandev	9 September 2022	8 May 2023	22	4	7	11	21	28	−7	18.18
Vardar	22 August 2023	18 December 2023	11	2	2	7	5	16	−11	18.18
Total			157	65	47	45	205	147	+58	41.40

== Honours ==
=== Player ===
Vardar

- Macedonian First League: 2001–02, 2002–03

Eintracht Frankfurt

- DFB-Pokal runner-up: 2005–06

Individual

- Macedonian Footballer of the Year: 2004

=== Manager ===
Vardar

- Macedonian First League: 2019–20
