= 2003–04 Eintracht Frankfurt season =

Eintracht Frankfurt
2003-04 season
- Chairman: Heribert Bruchhagen
- Manager: Willi Reimann
- Bundesliga: 16th
- DFB-Pokal: Second round
- Top goalscorer: League: Ervin Skela (8); All: Ervin Skela (8)
- Highest home attendance: 37,500 (31 January, vs Bayern Munich)
- Lowest home attendance: 15,000 (29 November, vs VfL Wolfsburg)
- Average home league attendance: 26,559
Home colours	Away colours

The 2003–04 Eintracht Frankfurt season was the 104th season in the club's football history. In 2003–04 the club played in the Bundesliga, the first tier of German football. It was the club's 100th season in the first tier.

== Results ==
=== Friendlies ===
Win Draw Loss

2 July 2003	FSG Bensheim	0–11	Eintracht Frankfurt	Bensheim, Germany
19:00 CEST		(Report)	Skela 4' (pen.), 33'; Beierle 21', 35'; Frommer 26', 88'; Lexa 36'; Dragusha 48'; Kreuz 52'; Montero 74', 80'	Stadium: Sportpark West

5 July 2003	Eintracht Norderstedt	0–15	Eintracht Frankfurt	Germany
		(Report)	Kreuz 13', 28'; Keller 15'; Frommer 29', 30', 39', 42', 70' (pen.), 89'; Beierle 38', 54', 74'; Dragusha 43', 53'; Tsoumou-Madza 88'	Attendance: 1,000

9 July 2003	Team Sylt 2002	0–13	Eintracht Frankfurt	Sylt, Germany
19:00 CEST		(Report)	Jones 15', 21'; Puljiz 18'; Skela 34' (pen.), 39'; Lexa 44'; Cha 45'; Frommer 61'; Kreuz 66'; Warnemünde 71' (o.g.); Beierle 87'; Tsoumou-Madza 88'; Montero 90'	Stadium: Syltstadion; Attendance: 1,000; Referee: Schröder

11 July 2003	FC Langenhorn	0–12	Eintracht Frankfurt	Langenhorn, Germany
19:00 CEST		(Report)	Dragusha 5'; Cimen 9'; Beierle 14'; Jones 20'; Lexa 50'; Frommer 62', 88'; Kreuz 64'; Montero 66'; Cha 69', 90'; Skela 76'	Stadium: Waldstadion; Attendance: 1,500; Referee: Hinrichs

12 July 2003	VfL Pinneberg	0–4	Eintracht Frankfurt	Pinneberg, Germany
15:00 CEST		(Report)	Cha 45', 90'; Schur 70'; Beierle 80'	Stadium: Stadion 1 an der Fahltsweide; Attendance: 500

16 July 2003	FC Ederbergland	1–11	Eintracht Frankfurt	Battenberg, Germany
18:00 CEST	Schneider 45'	(Report)	Lexa 25'; Frommer 26', 28'; Dragusha 44'; Schur 50'; Cha 65', 68'; Weißenfeldt 66'; Kreuz 69', 72'; Beierle 76'	Stadium: Sportplatz Entenpark; Attendance: 1,500; Referee: Pfuhl

19 July 2003	FC Eddersheim	1–2	Eintracht Frankfurt	Hofheim, Germany
16:00 CEST	Metzger 6'	(Report)	Dragusha 30'; Jones 82'	Stadium: Sportpark Heide; Attendance: 3,500

23 July 2003	SpVgg Steinefrenz-Weroth	0–15	Eintracht Frankfurt	Weroth, Germany
18:30 CEST		(Report)	Keller 9'; Montero 27', 29' (pen.); Schur 33', 42'; Cha 40', 67', 89'; Beierle 50', 74'; Dragusha 66'; Jones 75', 87'; Dragusha 80'; Günther 84'	Stadium: Sportplatz Weroth; Attendance: 2,000

26 July 2003	1. FC Nürnberg	2–1	Eintracht Frankfurt	Kitzingen, Germany
18:00 CEST	Larsen 34'; Mandra 87'	(Report)	Jones 16'	Stadium: Stadion im Sickergrund; Attendance: 2,500

12 August 2003	SG Dornheim	2–4	Eintracht Frankfurt	Rödermark, Germany
18:30 CEST	Moog 6'; Klupp 83'	(Report)	Jones 8', 60', 78'; Beierle 53'	Attendance: 500

5 September 2003	FV Lauda	1–2	Eintracht Frankfurt	Germany
19:00 CEST	Haas 11'	(Report)	Lexa 35'; Möller 42'	Attendance: 3,000

9 September 2003	SG Egelsbach	0–11	Eintracht Frankfurt	Egelsbach, Germany
18:00 CEST		(Report)	Kreuz 5'; Schur 9'; Cha 32', 40', 57', 74', 78'; Beierle 47', 72'; Frommer 55'; Puljiz 83'	Stadium: Sporgelände am Berliner Platz; Attendance: 1,500

9 October 2003	FC Metz	0–1	Eintracht Frankfurt	Saint-Avold, France
19:30 CEST		(Report)	Jones 24'	Attendance: 2,000

14 November 2003	Arminia Bielefeld	1–0	Eintracht Frankfurt	Rödermark, Germany
19:30 CEST	Küntzel 84'	(Report)		Attendance: 1,000; Referee: Weber

18 November 2003	SpVgg 03 Neu-Isenburg	0–10	Eintracht Frankfurt	Germany
18:30 CEST		(Report)	Frommer 7'; Dică (guest player) 16', 24', 28', 86'; Dragusha 31', 48'; Reinhard 81'; Kreuz 87', 90' (pen.)	Attendance: 1,500

7 January 2004	Wormatia Worms	0–1	Eintracht Frankfurt	Worms, Germany
18:30 CEST		(Report)	Chris 40'	Attendance: 800; Referee: Torsten Bauer

11 January 2004	SG Dornheim	0–10	Eintracht Frankfurt	Germany
		(Report)	Beierle 13', 73'; Puljiz 16'; Kreuz 23'; Frommer 37'; Bürger 43'; Lexa 51'; Cha 65', 82'; Dragusha 87'	Attendance: 500

14 January 2004	Eintracht Frankfurt	2–0	LR Ahlen	Jerez de la Frontera, Spain
	Beierle 38'; Frommer 78'	(Report)

18 January 2004	Eintracht Frankfurt	3–1	Arminia Bielefeld	Jerez de la Frontera, Spain
18:30 CEST	Beierle 50'; Skela 55' (pen.); Kreuz 79'	(Report)	Dammeier 38' (pen.)

23 March 2004	Rot-Weiss Frankfurt	0–7	Eintracht Frankfurt
16:45 CEST		(Report)	Nascimento 33'; Frommer 35', 41', 53', 68' di Gregorio 77'; Beierle 80'	Attendance: 1,000

=== Indoor soccer tournaments ===
==== Hannover ====
9 January 2004 First match	Hannover Allstars XI	0–4	Eintracht Frankfurt	Hanover, Germany
		(Report)	Lexa; Cha; Frommer; Chris	Stadium: Preussag Arena

9 January 2004 Second match	Union Berlin	1–1	Eintracht Frankfurt	Hanover, Germany
	Goal	(Report)	Lexa	Stadium: Preussag Arena

9 January 2004 Third match	Hannover 96	2–1	Eintracht Frankfurt	Hanover, Germany
	Goal	(Report)	Bürger	Stadium: Preussag Arena

==== Riesa ====
10 January 2004 First match	Dynamo Dresden	5–0	Eintracht Frankfurt	Riesa, Germany
	Neubert; Ziebig; Hartung	(Report)		Stadium: Erdgas Arena; Attendance: 7,000

10 January 2004 Second match	Energie Cottbus	4–0	Eintracht Frankfurt	Riesa, Germany
	Gebhardt; Iordache; Schöckel	(Report)		Stadium: Erdgas Arena; Attendance: 7,000

=== Competitions ===
Win Draw Loss

==== Bundesliga ====
===== League table =====
Pos	Team	Pld	W	D	L	GF	GA	GD	Pts	Qualification or relegation
14	Hannover 96	34	9	10	15	49	63	−14	37	
15	1. FC Kaiserslautern (Note: 1. FC Kaiserslautern were docked three points for financial irregularities.)	34	11	6	17	39	62	−23	36	
16	Eintracht Frankfurt (R)	34	9	5	20	36	53	−17	32	Relegation to 2. Bundesliga
17	1860 Munich (R)	34	8	8	18	32	55	−23	32	Relegation to 2. Bundesliga
18	1. FC Köln (R)	34	6	5	23	32	57	−25	23	Relegation to 2. Bundesliga

Source: kicker.de
Rules for classification: 1) points; 2) goal difference; 3) number of goals scored.
(R) Relegated

===== Results summary =====
Overall								Home						Away					
Pld	W	D	L	GF	GA	GD	Pts	W	D	L	GF	GA	GD	W	D	L	GF	GA	GD
34	9	5	20	36	53	−17	32	6	4	7	25	24	+1	3	1	13	11	29	−18

Source: Competitive matches

===== Results by round =====
Round	1	2	3	4	5	6	7	8	9	10	11	12	13	14	15	16	17	18	19	20	21	22	23	24	25	26	27	28	29	30	31	32	33	34
Ground	A	H	A	H	A	H	A	H	A	H	A	H	A	H	H	A	H	H	A	H	A	H	A	H	A	H	A	H	A	H	A	A	H	A
Result	L	L	L	D	W	L	D	L	L	W	L	L	L	W	D	L	L	D	W	D	W	W	L	W	L	L	L	L	L	W	L	L	W	L
Position	13	18	18	16	13	15	15	16	17	14	14	16	17	16	16	17	18	17	16	17	16	14	16	13	15	15	16	17	17	17	17	17	16	16

Source: kicker.de
A = Away; H = Home; W = Win; D = Draw; L = Loss

===== Matches =====
1 August 2003 1	Bayern Munich	3–1	Eintracht Frankfurt	Munich
20:30 CEST	Zé Roberto 16'; Salihamidžić 20'; Pizarro 42'	(Report)	Skela 68'	Stadium: Olympiastadion; Attendance: 60,000; Referee: Kircher

10 August 2003 2	Eintracht Frankfurt	1–2	Bayer Leverkusen	Frankfurt
17:30 CEST	Frommer 42'	(Report)	B Schneider 51'; Çipi 84' (o.g.)	Stadium: Waldstadion; Attendance: 22,500; Referee: Keßler

16 August 2003 3	Hansa Rostock	3–0	Eintracht Frankfurt	Rostock
15:30 CEST	Max 19', 55', 66' (pen.)	(Report)		Stadium: Ostseestadion; Attendance: 20,000; Referee: Kinhöfer

23 August 2003 4	Eintracht Frankfurt	0–0	Hertha BSC	Frankfurt
15:30 CEST		(Report)		Stadium: Waldstadion; Attendance: 22,500; Referee: Koop

14 September 2003 5	Borussia Mönchengladbach	0–2	Eintracht Frankfurt	Mönchengladbach
17:30 CEST		(Report)	Kreuz 17'; Bürger 90'	Stadium: Bökelbergstadion; Attendance: 34,000; Referee: Wack

21 September 2003 6	Eintracht Frankfurt	1–3	1. FC Kaiserslautern	Frankfurt
17:30 CEST	Skela (red card) 90'; Beierle 93'	(Report)	Hristov 6', 52'; Klose 48'	Stadium: Waldstadion; Attendance: 23,000; Referee: Jansen

28 September 2003 7	FC Schalke 04	1–1	Eintracht Frankfurt	Gelsenkirchen
17:30 CEST	Rodríguez 33'	(Report)	Chris 38'	Stadium: Arena AufSchalke; Attendance: 61,500; Referee: Kircher

4 October 2003 8	Eintracht Frankfurt	0–1	Borussia Dortmund	Frankfurt
15:30 CEST		(Report)	Reina 10'	Stadium: Waldstadion; Attendance: 25,000; Referee: Steinborn

18 October 2003 9	TSV 1860 Munich	1–0	Eintracht Frankfurt	Munich
15:30 CEST	Lauth 90' (pen.)	(Report)		Stadium: Olympiastadion; Attendance: 20,000; Referee: Gagelmann

25 October 2003 10	Eintracht Frankfurt	2–0	1. FC Köln	Frankfurt
15:30 CEST	Frommer 63'; Dragusha 81'	(Report)		Stadium: Waldstadion; Attendance: 27,500; Referee: Weiner

1 November 2003 11	Werder Bremen	3–1	Eintracht Frankfurt	Bremen
15:30 CEST	Aílton 18'; Baumann 25'; Klasnić 71'	(Report)	Chris 67'	Stadium: Weserstadion; Attendance: 34,500; Referee: Albrecht

8 November 2003 12	Eintracht Frankfurt	0–2	VfB Stuttgart	Frankfurt
15:30 CEST	Çipi (red card) 89'	(Report)	Szabics 8'; Kurányi 71'; Meira (red card) 89'	Stadium: Waldstadion; Attendance: 27,000; Referee: Kemmling

23 November 2003 13	SC Freiburg	1–0	Eintracht Frankfurt	Freiburg
17:30 CEST	Sanou 82'	(Report)		Stadium: Dreisamstadion; Attendance: 25,000; Referee: Fröhlich

29 November 2003 14	Eintracht Frankfurt	3–2	VfL Wolfsburg	Frankfurt
15:30 CEST	Preuß 33'; Skela 56' (pen.); Beierle 73'	(Report)	Karhan 13'; Klimowicz 25'	Stadium: Waldstadion; Attendance: 15,000; Referee: Keßler

6 December 2003 15	Eintracht Frankfurt	2–2	Hannover 96	Frankfurt
15:30 CEST	Schur 17'; Skela 64' (pen.)	(Report)	Stendel 18'; Christiansen 87' (pen.)	Stadium: Waldstadion; Attendance: 19,000; Referee: Koop

13 December 2003 16	VfL Bochum	1–0	Eintracht Frankfurt	Bochum
15:30 CEST	Hashemian 21'	(Report)		Stadium: Ruhrstadion; Attendance: 23,000; Referee: Weiner

16 December 2003 17	Eintracht Frankfurt	2–3	Hamburger SV	Frankfurt
20:00 CEST	Skela 53'; Beierle 64'	(Report)	Beinlich 17'; Takahara 52'; Barbarez 85'	Stadium: Waldstadion; Attendance: 21,000; Referee: Kinhöfer

31 January 2004 18	Eintracht Frankfurt	1–1	Bayern Munich	Frankfurt
15:30 CEST	Skela 45' (pen.)	(Report)	Makaay 1'	Stadium: Waldstadion; Attendance: 37,500; Referee: Jansen

7 February 2004 19	Bayer Leverkusen	1–2	Eintracht Frankfurt	Leverkusen
15:30 CEST	Neuville 61'	(Report)	Hertzsch 21'Amanatidis 77'	Stadium: BayArena; Attendance: 22,500; Referee: Steinborn

14 February 2004 20	Eintracht Frankfurt	1–1	Hansa Rostock	Frankfurt
15:30 CEST	Chris 39'	(Report)	Arvidsson 82'	Stadium: Waldstadion; Attendance: 24,000; Referee: Fandel

22 February 2004 21	Hertha BSC	1–2	Eintracht Frankfurt	Berlin
17:30 CEST	Rafael 63'	(Report)	Cha 18'; Amanatidis 65'	Stadium: Olympiastadion; Attendance: 35,000; Referee: Stark

28 February 2004 22	Eintracht Frankfurt	3–1	Borussia Mönchengladbach	Frankfurt
15:30 CEST	Skela 16'; Amanatidis 18'; Schur 55'	(Report)	van Lent 74'	Stadium: Waldstadion; Attendance: 32,000; Referee: Schmidt

6 March 2004 23	1. FC Kaiserslautern	1–0	Eintracht Frankfurt	Kaiserslautern
15:30 CEST	Malz 90'	(Report)		Stadium: Fritz-Walter-Stadion; Attendance: 40,500; Referee: Wack

13 March 2004 24	Eintracht Frankfurt	3–0	FC Schalke 04	Frankfurt
15:30 CEST	Amanatidis 57'; Skela 79'; Schur 80'	(Report)		Stadium: Waldstadion; Attendance: 35,500; Referee: Weiner

20 March 2004 25	Borussia Dortmund	2–0	Eintracht Frankfurt	Dortmund
15:30 CEST	Ewerthon 23'; Koller 80'	(Report)	Bürger (yellow card) 39' (yellow-red card)	Stadium: Westfalenstadion; Attendance: 80,500; Referee: Albrecht

27 March 2004 26	Eintracht Frankfurt	0–3	TSV 1860 Munich	Frankfurt
15:30 CEST		(Report)	Görlitz 9'; Lehmann 16'; Agostino 59'	Stadium: Waldstadion; Attendance: 30,000; Referee: Kinhöfer

3 April 2004 27	1. FC Köln	2–0	Eintracht Frankfurt	Cologne
15:30 CEST	Hertzsch 5' (o.g.); Podolski 35'	(Report)		Stadium: RheinEnergieStadion; Attendance: 45,500; Referee: Meyer

10 April 2004 28	Eintracht Frankfurt	0–1	Werder Bremen	Frankfurt
15:30 CEST	Amanatidis (red card) 42'	(Report)	Davala (red card) 42'; Ismaël 80' (pen.)	Stadium: Waldstadion; Attendance: 33,000; Referee: Jansen

17 April 2004 29	VfB Stuttgart	3–1	Eintracht Frankfurt	Stuttgart
15:30 CEST	Kurányi 44'; Hleb 50'; Bordon 80'	(Report)	Schur 85'	Stadium: Gottlieb-Daimler-Stadion; Attendance: 48,000; Referee: Steinborn

24 April 2004 30	Eintracht Frankfurt	3–0	SC Freiburg	Frankfurt
15:30 CEST	Skela 29' (pen.); Preuß 45'; Beierle 72'	(Report)		Stadium: Waldstadion; Attendance: 25,500; Referee: Fandel

1 May 2004 31	VfL Wolfsburg	1–0	Eintracht Frankfurt	Wolfsburg
15:30 CEST	Klimowicz 18'	(Report)		Stadium: Volkswagen Arena; Attendance: 24,500; Referee: Albrecht

8 May 2004 32	Hannover 96	3–0	Eintracht Frankfurt	Hanover
15:30 CEST	Brdarić 42', 75'; Idrissou 89'	(Report)		Stadium: Niedersachsenstadion; Attendance: 27,500; Referee: Stark

15 May 2004 33	Eintracht Frankfurt	3–2	VfL Bochum	Frankfurt
15:30 CEST	Preuß 13'; Puljiz 19'; Amanatidis 51'	(Report)	Hashemian 30'; Wosz 50'	Stadium: Waldstadion; Attendance: 31,500; Referee: Kemmling

22 May 2004 34	Hamburger SV	2–1	Eintracht Frankfurt	Hamburg
15:30 CEST	Mahdavikia 28'; Barbarez 57'	(Report)	Amanatidis 26'	Stadium: Volksparkstadion; Attendance: 53,000; Referee: Kircher

==== DFB-Pokal ====
1 September 2003 1st Round	Kickers Offenbach	1–1 (a.e.t.) (3–4 p)	Eintracht Frankfurt	Offenbach
17:30 CEST	Petry 22'	(Report)	Frommer 55'	Stadium: Stadion am Bieberer Berg; Attendance: 20,500; Referee: Fandel
	Penalties
	Falk (penalty missed); Judt (penalty scored); Barletta (penalty scored); Knappmann (penalty scored); Thier (penalty missed)		(penalty scored) Skela; (penalty missed) Çipi; (penalty scored) Kreuz; (penalty scored) Preuß; (penalty scored) Jones

29 October 2003 2nd Round	MSV Duisburg	1–2 (a.e.t.)	Eintracht Frankfurt	Frankfurt, Germany
19:00 CEST	Kreuz 4'	(Report)	Cacá 44'; Ahanfouf 109'	Stadium: Waldstadion; Attendance: 10,500; Referee: Meyer

== Players ==
=== First-team squad ===
Squad at end of season

Note: Flags indicate national team as defined under FIFA eligibility rules; some limited exceptions apply. Players may hold more than one non-FIFA nationality.

No.	Pos.	Nation	Player
1	GK	MKD	Oka Nikolov (Note: Nikolov was born in Erbach im Odenwald, West Germany (now Germany), but also qualified to represent Macedonia (now North Macedonia) internationally and made his international debut for Macedonia in September 1998.)
2	DF	GER	Sven Günther
3	MF	GER	Henning Bürger
4	DF	GER	Andree Wiedener
5	DF	GER	Jens Keller
6	FW	GRE	Ioannis Amanatidis (on loan from Stuttgart)
7	MF	ALB	Ervin Skela
8	MF	AUT	Stefan Lexa
9	MF	KOR	Cha Du-ri (Note: Cha was born in Frankfurt, West Germany (now Germany), but also qualified to represent South Korea internationally through his father and made his international debut for South Korea in 2001.) (on loan from Bayer Leverkusen)
10	FW	GER	Nico Frommer
13	DF	GER	Uwe Bindewald
15	DF	CRO	Jurica Puljiz
16	MF	GER	Markus Kreuz
17	MF	GER	Daniyel Cimen

No.	Pos.	Nation	Player
18	DF	GER	Baldo di Gregorio
19	MF	ALB	Mehmet Dragusha (Note: Dragusha was born in Pristina, SFR Yugoslavia (now Kosovo), and made his international debut for Kosovo in September 2002, but also qualified to represent Albania internationally and made his international debut for Albania in 2003.)
20	FW	GER	Markus Beierle
21	DF	GER	Lars Weißenfeldt
22	GK	GER	Markus Pröll
23	DF	CGO	Jean-Clotaire Tsoumou-Madza
24	MF	GER	Alexander Schur
25	DF	GER	Alexander Huber (Note: Huber was born in Leninabad, Tajik SSR, Soviet Union (now Khujand, Tajikistan), but was raised in Germany from the age of 4 and represented Germany at U-20 and B level before making his international debut for Tajikistan in June 2017.)
27	DF	GER	Christoph Preuß
28	DF	BRA	Vivaldo Nascimento
29	DF	BRA	Chris
30	GK	GER	Andreas Menger
33	DF	GER	Ingo Hertzsch

=== Left club during season ===
Note: Flags indicate national team as defined under FIFA eligibility rules; some limited exceptions apply. Players may hold more than one non-FIFA nationality.

No.	Pos.	Nation	Player
6	FW	GER	David Montero (to Rot-Weiß Oberhausen)
11	MF	GER	Jermaine Jones (Note: Jones was born in Frankfurt, West Germany (now Germany), and represented Germany at U-20, U-21 and B level before making his international debut for Germany in 2008, but also qualified to represent the United States through his father and made his international debut for the United States in October 2010.) (to Bayer Leverkusen)
12	DF	BRA	Matheus Vivian (to Las Palmas)

No.	Pos.	Nation	Player
14	FW	BRA	Franciel Hengemühle (to 1. FC Eschborn)
26	DF	ALB	Geri Çipi (to Rot-Weiß Oberhausen)
32	MF	GER	Andreas Möller (retired)

=== Eintracht Frankfurt II ===
Note: Flags indicate national team as defined under FIFA eligibility rules; some limited exceptions apply. Players may hold more than one non-FIFA nationality.

No.	Pos.	Nation	Player
—	GK	GER	Jan Zimmermann
—	DF	GER	Christopher Reinhard

No.	Pos.	Nation	Player
—	DF	GER	Marco Russ

=== Under-19s ===
Note: Flags indicate national team as defined under FIFA eligibility rules; some limited exceptions apply. Players may hold more than one non-FIFA nationality.

No.	Pos.	Nation	Player
—	DF	GER	Mounir Chaftar

=== Under-17s ===
Note: Flags indicate national team as defined under FIFA eligibility rules; some limited exceptions apply. Players may hold more than one non-FIFA nationality.

No.	Pos.	Nation	Player
—	MF	GER	Faton Toski (Note: Toski was born in Gjilan, SFR Yugoslavia (now Kosovo), but was raised in Germany and represented Germany at U-19 level before making his international debut for Kosovo in March 2014.)
—	MF	GER	Richard Weil

No.	Pos.	Nation	Player
—	MF	CRO	Krešo Ljubičić (Note: Ljubičić was born in Hanau, West Germany (now Germany), but also qualified to represent Croatia internationally and represented Croatia at U-17, U-18, U-19, U-20 and U-21 level.)

== Statistics ==
=== Appearances and goals ===
No.	Pos	Nat	Player	Total		Bundesliga		DFB-Pokal	
No.	Pos	Nat	Player	Apps	Goals	Apps	Goals	Apps	Goals
1	GK	(North Macedonia) MKD	Oka Nikolov	33	0	31	0	2	0
2	DF	(Germany) GER	Sven Günther	26	0	25	0	1	0
3	DF	(Germany) GER	Henning Bürger	21	1	21	1	0	0
4	DF	(Germany) GER	Andree Wiedener	19	0	17	0	2	0
5	DF	(Germany) GER	Jens Keller	2	0	2	0	0	0
6	MF	(Spain) ESP	~~David Montero~~	1	0	1	0	0	0
6	FW	(Greece) GRE	Ioannis Amanatidis	15	6	15	6	0	0
7	MF	(Albania) ALB	Ervin Skela	32	8	30	8	2	0
8	MF	(Austria) AUT	Stefan Lexa	31	0	30	0	1	0
9	MF	(South Korea) KOR	Cha Du-Ri	33	1	31	1	2	0
10	FW	(Germany) GER	Nico Frommer	22	3	20	2	2	1
11	FW	(Germany) GER	~~Jermaine Jones~~	6	0	5	0	1	0
13	DF	(Germany) GER	Uwe Bindewald	22	0	21	0	1	0
15	DF	(Croatia) CRO	Jurica Puljiz	15	1	15	1	0	0
16	MF	(Germany) GER	Markus Kreuz	32	2	30	1	2	1
19	MF	(Albania) ALB	Mehmet Dragusha	15	1	14	1	1	0
20	FW	(Germany) GER	Markus Beierle	22	4	20	4	2	0
21	MF	(Germany) GER	Lars Weißenfeldt	1	0	1	0	0	0
22	GK	(Germany) GER	Markus Pröll	3	0	3	0	0	0
23	DF	(Republic of the Congo) CGO	Jean-Clotaire Tsoumou-Madza	9	0	8	0	1	0
24	MF	(Germany) GER	Alexander Schur	33	4	31	4	2	0
25	DF	(Brazil) BRA	Nascimento	2	0	2	0	0	0
26	DF	(Albania) ALB	~~Geri Çipi~~	15	0	13	0	2	0
27	MF	(Germany) GER	Christoph Preuß	31	3	29	3	2	0
29	DF	(Brazil) BRA	Chris	26	3	25	3	1	0
32	MF	(Germany) GER	~~Andreas Möller~~	12	0	11	0	1	0
33	DF	(Germany) GER	Ingo Hertzsch	15	1	15	1	0	0

== Transfers ==
=== Summer ===
In:

No.	Pos.	Nation	Player
8	MF	AUT	Stefan Lexa (from CD Tenerife)
9	MF	KOR	Cha Du-ri (loaned from Bayer Leverkusen)
10	FW	GER	Nico Frommer (from SSV Reutlingen)
15	DF	CRO	Jurica Puljiz (from HNK Šibenik)
16	MF	GER	Markus Kreuz (from 1. FC Köln)
19	MF	ALB	Mehmet Dragusha (from Eintracht Trier)
22	GK	GER	Markus Pröll (from 1. FC Köln)
26	DF	ALB	Geri Çipi (from KAA Gent)
27	MF	GER	Christoph Preuß (loaned from Bayer Leverkusen)
29	DF	BRA	Chris (from FC St. Pauli)
32	MF	GER	Andreas Möller (from FC Schalke 04)

Out:

No.	Pos.	Nation	Player
6	MF	ESP	David Montero (to Rot-Weiß Oberhausen)
8	MF	GER	Michael Wenczel (to FC Augsburg)
9	FW	POL	Paweł Kryszałowicz (to Amica Wronki)
10	MF	GER	Dino Toppmöller (to Erzgebirge Aue)
12	MF	BRA	Matheus Vivian (loan to Grêmio)
16	MF	CMR	Serge Branco (to VfB Stuttgart)
19	MF	GER	Albert Streit (to VfL Wolfsburg)
26	MF	GER	Bakary Diakité (to OGC Nice)

=== Winter ===
In:

No.	Pos.	Nation	Player
6	FW	GRE	Ioannis Amanatidis (from VfB Stuttgart)
25	DF	BRA	Nascimento (loaned from FC St. Pauli)
33	DF	GER	Ingo Hertzsch (loaned from Bayer Leverkusen)

Out:

No.	Pos.	Nation	Player
11	FW	GER	Jermaine Jones (to Bayer Leverkusen)
26	DF	ALB	Geri Çipi (to Rot-Weiß Oberhausen)
32	MF	GER	Andreas Möller (retired)

== Sources ==
- Matheja, Ulrich (2011). Unsere Eintracht - Eintracht Frankfurt - Die Chronik. Die Werkstatt. ISBN 978-3-89533-750-5.
