= 2000–01 Bayer 04 Leverkusen season =

Bayer Leverkusen
2000–01 season
- Manager: Berti Vogts
- Bundesliga: 4th
- DFB-Pokal: Third round
- Champions League: First group stage
- UEFA Cup: Third round
- Top goalscorer: League: Oliver Neuville (15); All: Oliver Neuville (16)
- Average home league attendance: 22,412
Home colours	Away colours	Third colours

Bayer Leverkusen had a solid season, where it managed to qualify for another Champions League campaign, following a 4th-place finish. Unlike the previous season, it failed to actively challenge for the Bundesliga title for the second year running, also going out of the Champions League already in the group stage.

The most important players of the season included Oliver Neuville, who scored 15 goals, plus attacking midfielder Michael Ballack, who cemented his position as Germany's new dominant playmaker.

== Squad ==
=== Goalkeepers ===
- (Switzerland) Pascal Zuberbühler
- (Poland) Adam Matysek
- (Australia) (Croatia) Frank Jurić
- (Germany) Tom Starke

=== Defenders ===
- (Slovakia) Vratislav Gresko
- (Germany) Torben Hoffmann
- (Brazil) (Portugal) Lúcio
- (Germany) Jörg Reeb
- (Germany) Jens Nowotny
- (Croatia) Boris Živković
- (Croatia) (Germany) Robert Kovač
- (Argentina) (Italy) Diego Placente

=== Midfielders ===
- (Germany) Andreas Neuendorf
- (Croatia) Marko Babić
- (Brazil) (Italy) Robson Ponte
- (Brazil) Zé Roberto
- (Germany) Michael Ballack
- (Croatia) Jurica Vranjes
- (Nigeria) (Germany) Pascal Ojigwe
- (United States) (Croatia) Frankie Hejduk
- (Brazil) Marquinhos
- (Germany) Bernd Schneider
- (United States) Landon Donovan
- (Germany) Carsten Ramelow
- (Germany) (Bosnia and Herzegovina) Anel Džaka

=== Attackers ===
- (Iran) Ali Mousavi
- (Germany) Ulf Kirsten
- (Germany) Paulo Rink
- (Bulgaria) Dimitar Berbatov
- (Germany) Thomas Brdarić
- (Germany) Oliver Neuville
- (Germany) Markus Daun

== Kits ==
Home	Home Alternate	Away	Away Alternate	Third
