= Jens Nowotny =

German footballer (born 1974)

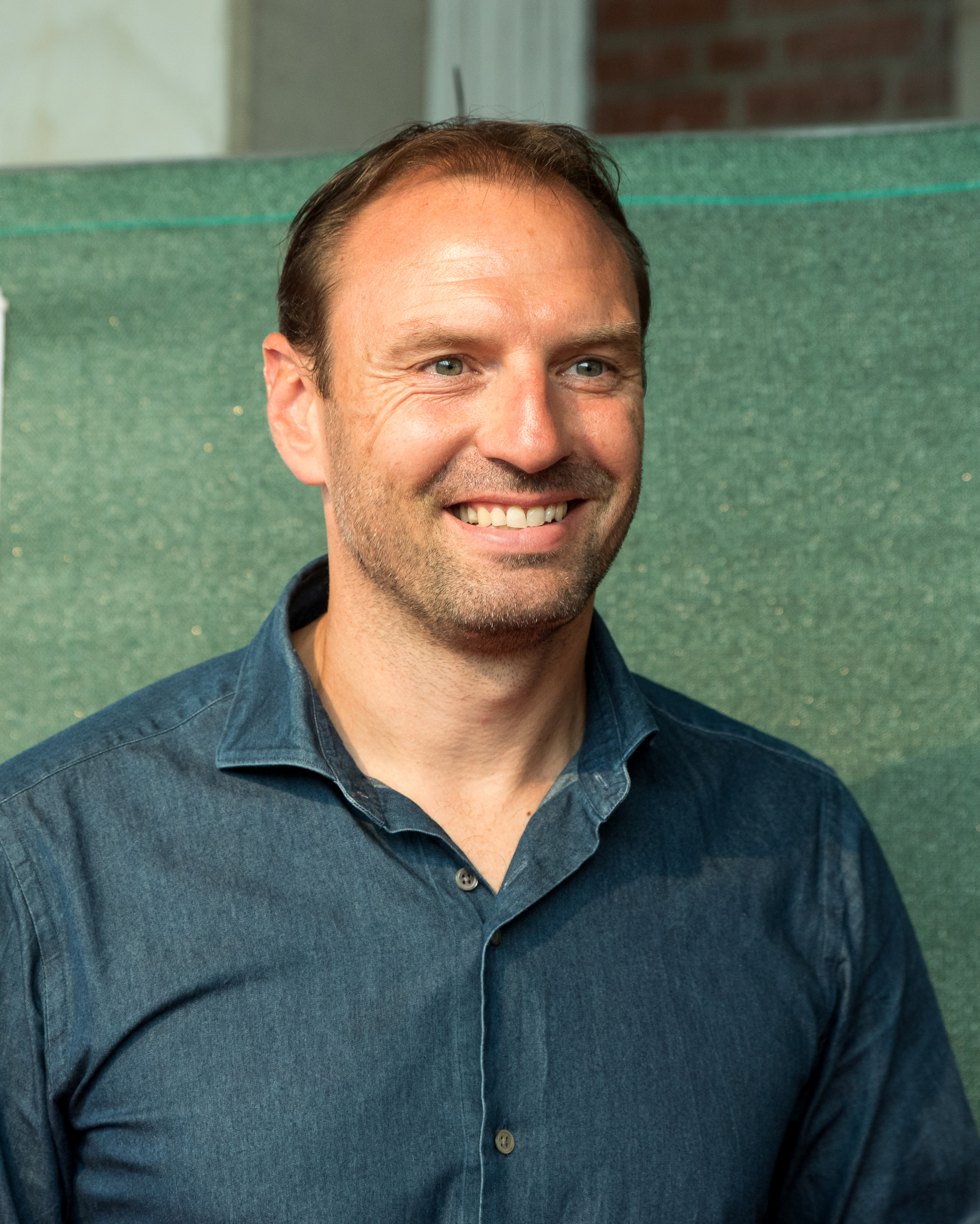
- Nowotny in 2016

Personal information
- Full name: Jens Daniel Nowotny
- Date of birth: 11 January 1974 (age 52)
- Place of birth: Malsch, West Germany
- Height: 1.87 m (6 ft 2 in)
- Positions: Centre-back; sweeper

Youth career
- 1979–1985: SV Spielberg
- 1985–1990: FC Germania Friedrichstal
- 1990–1991: Karlsruher SC

Senior career*
Years	Team	Apps	(Gls)
1991–1996	Karlsruher SC	103	(7)
1996–2006	Bayer Leverkusen	231	(4)
2006–2007	Dinamo Zagreb	10	(0)
Total		344	(11)

International career
1994–1996	Germany U21	12	(0)
1997–2006	Germany	48	(1)
- * Club domestic league appearances and goals

Jens Daniel Nowotny (born 11 January 1974) is a German former professional footballer who played as a centre-back or sweeper. He played in nearly 300 official games with Bayer Leverkusen in one full decade, helping them reach the 2002 Champions League final. Internationally, Nowotny appeared for Germany in one World Cup and two European Championships, gaining 48 caps.

== Club career ==
=== Karlsruher SC ===
After playing youth football for two clubs, Nowotny finished his formation with Karlsruher SC. He made his first team – and Bundesliga – on 2 May 1992, playing the entire 1–0 away win against Hamburger SV, and finished the season in the starting eleven, as the club collected three wins in four matches (three goals conceded) and finished in eighth position.

Still not in his 20s, Nowotny became a defensive mainstay for Karlsruhe. On 10 April 1993, he scored a brace for the club in only ten minutes, in a 2–2 draw at VfL Bochum, and went on to collect nearly 150 official appearances during his spell, including four in the 1993–94 UEFA Cup.

=== Bayer Leverkusen ===
Aged 22, Nowotny signed for Bayer 04 Leverkusen, making his league debut on 21 August 1996, a 3–1 away success against MSV Duisburg. An undisputed first-choice from the start, he appeared in 32 matches in his first season, as the club finished in second place, trailing FC Bayern Munich by two points; he continued to appear regularly during his stay, often forming an efficient defensive partnership with Carsten Ramelow.

On 30 October 1998, Nowotny scored his first league goal for Leverkusen, in an 8–2 home demolition of Borussia Mönchengladbach. Additionally, he appeared in 16 games in the club's 2001–02 UEFA Champions League runner-up run; however, he was greatly missed in the following season's league campaign, only appearing once as the club finished in 15th position, narrowly escaping relegation, and having the fourth-worse defensive record in the league, at 56 goals conceded.

On 28 September 2004, Nowotny scored his first and only Champions League goal, in Bayer's 2–4 away defeat against FC Dynamo Kyiv. He left the club in the 2006 summer, with more than 300 official appearances - 231 in the Bundesliga - in 10 years.

=== Dinamo Zagreb ===
On 18 July 2006, 32-year-old Nowotny agreed to sign a three-year contract with Croatian League champions NK Dinamo Zagreb. He made his debut for Dinamo on 29 July, against NK Slaven Belupo, in the first domestic league match of 2006–07, and also appeared in the club's Champions League qualifying round against Arsenal – the English had tried to sign him in the past – a 0–3 home defeat.

On 19 August 2006, Nowotny suffered an injury during Dinamo's home match against NK Međimurje, a 4–1 win. Even though he was not fully healed and had played all 90 minutes for Germany in a friendly match only three days earlier, he asked to play because his wife and children came to Zagreb to watch him. Coach Josip Kuže, as he later admitted, had his doubts about the player's decision to play; he also had thoughts to substitute him by the end of the match, but changed his mind because of the fans, who had accepted Nowotny with acclamation. After the match, his injury became more serious, and needed surgery, and a one-month layoff (he missed both legs of the side's 2–5 aggregate loss against AJ Auxerre, for the UEFA Cup).

Eventually, on 22 January 2007, Nowotny announced his retirement from football, not being able to fully recover. He said: "To think I may have to wait another 10 months through physiotherapy and returning to training – this is enough."

== International career ==
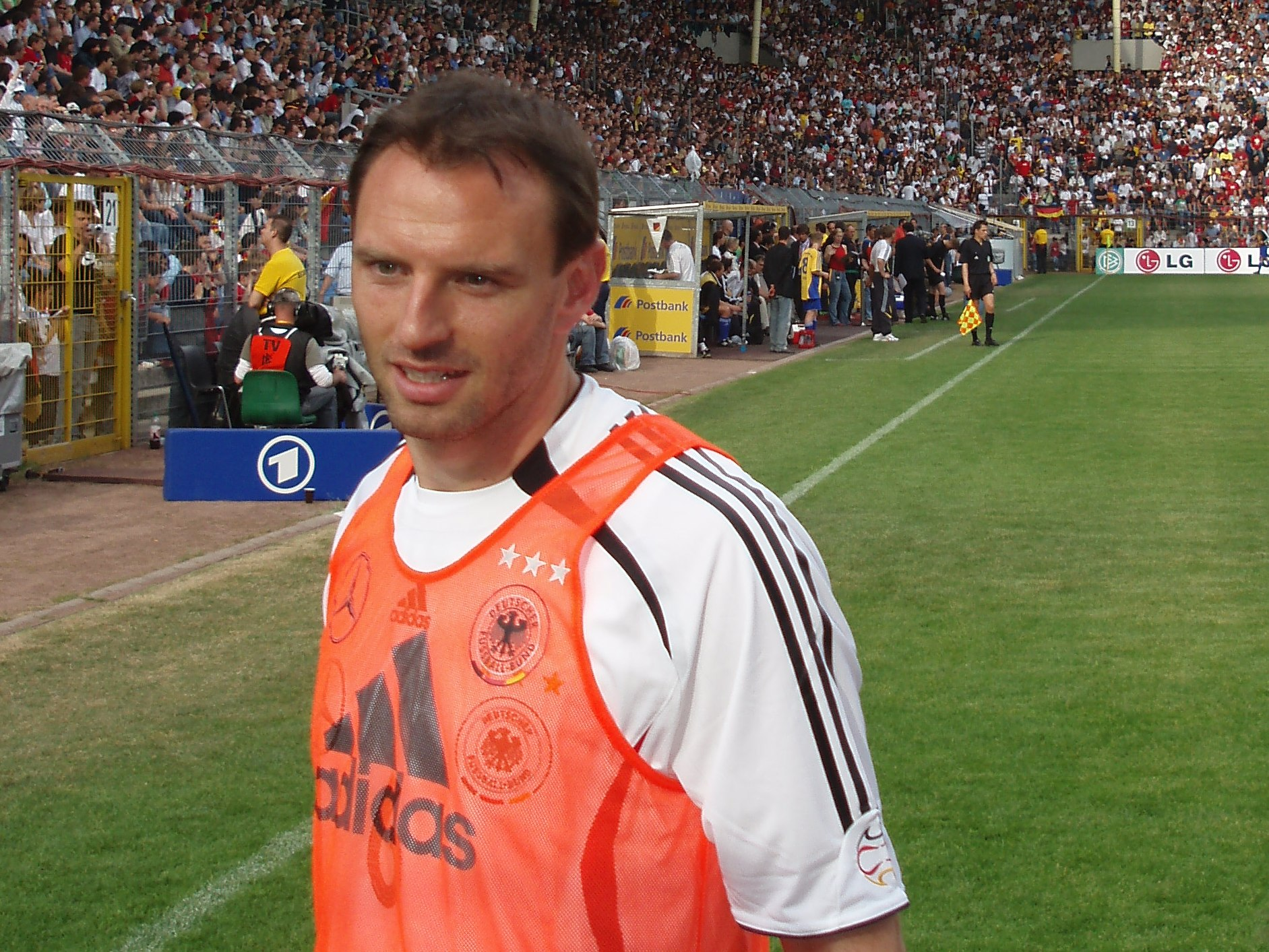
Nowotny with Germany in 2006

Nowotny made his debut for the Germany national team on 30 April 1997, in a 1998 FIFA World Cup qualifier against Ukraine played in Bremen, replacing striker Fredi Bobic after 15 minutes.

He was subsequently part of the squads at two UEFA European Football Championships, 2000 and 2004, totalling five appearances in two group stage exits; he missed the 2002 World Cup due to a serious injury.

Nowotny was then picked for the 2006 World Cup in his country, after two years of absence from international football. However, the experienced stopper spent the whole tournament as backup to younger Christoph Metzelder and Per Mertesacker, only playing in the third-place play-off against Portugal (3–1 win), as stand-in for the injured Mertesacker. In total he won 48 caps, scoring his only goal in a friendly match, a 7–0 victory over Malta on 27 May 2004.

== Career statistics ==
=== Club ===
Appearances and goals by club, season and competition
Club	Season	League			National cup		League cup		Continental		Total	
Club	Season	Division	Apps	Goals	Apps	Goals	Apps	Goals	Apps	Goals	Apps	Goals
Karlsruher SC	1991–92	Bundesliga	4	0	0	0	—		—		4	0
Karlsruher SC	1992–93	Bundesliga	29	3	3	0	—		—		32	3
Karlsruher SC	1993–94	Bundesliga	20	2	0	0	—		4 (Note: Appearances in UEFA Cup)	0	24	2
Karlsruher SC	1994–95	Bundesliga	26	1	3	1	—		—		29	2
Karlsruher SC	1995–96	Bundesliga	24	1	4	1	—		4 (Note: Appearances in UEFA Intertoto Cup)	1	32	3
Karlsruher SC	Total		103	7	10	2	0	0	8	1	121	10
Bayer Leverkusen	1996–97	Bundesliga	32	0	1	0	—		—		33	0
Bayer Leverkusen	1997–98	Bundesliga	23	0	3	0	0	0	6 (Note: Appearances in UEFA Champions League)	0	32	0
Bayer Leverkusen	1998–99	Bundesliga	33	1	2	0	0	0	4	0	39	1
Bayer Leverkusen	1999–2000	Bundesliga	33	1	0	0	1	0	8 (Note: Six appearances in UEFA Champions League, two appearances in UEFA Cup)	0	42	1
Bayer Leverkusen	2000–01	Bundesliga	28	1	2	0	1	0	6 (Note: Five appearances in UEFA Champions League, one appearance in UEFA Cup)	0	37	1
Bayer Leverkusen	2001–02	Bundesliga	29	0	5	0	1	0	16	0	51	0
Bayer Leverkusen	2002–03	Bundesliga	1	0	0	0	0	0	0	0	1	0
Bayer Leverkusen	2003–04	Bundesliga	22	1	2	0	—		—		24	1
Bayer Leverkusen	2004–05	Bundesliga	16	0	0	0	0	0	6	1	22	1
Bayer Leverkusen	2005–06	Bundesliga	14	0	0	0	0	0	0	0	14	0
Bayer Leverkusen	Total		231	4	15	0	3	0	46	1	295	5
Dinamo Zagreb	2006–07	Prva HNL	10	0	0	0	—		1	0	11	0
Career total			344	11	25	2	3	0	55	2	427	15

=== International ===
Appearances and goals by national team and year
National team	Year	Apps	Goals
Germany	1997	4	0
Germany	1998	6	0
Germany	1999	6	0
Germany	2000	10	0
Germany	2001	9	0
Germany	2002	2	0
Germany	2003	1	0
Germany	2004	7	1
Germany	2005	0	0
Germany	2006	3	0
Total		48	1

Score and result list Germany's goal tally first, score column indicates score after Nowotny goal.

International goal scored by Jens Nowotny
No.	Date	Venue	Opponent	Score	Result	Competition
1	27 May 2004	Schwarzwald-Stadion, Freiburg, Germany	Malta	3–0	7–0	Friendly

== Honours ==
Bayer Leverkusen

- Bundesliga runner-up: 1996–97, 1998–99, 1999–2000, 2001–02
- UEFA Champions League runner-up: 2001–02
- DFB-Pokal runner-up: 2001–02

Dinamo Zagreb

- Croatian First Football League: 2006–07
- Croatian Football Cup: 2006–07

Germany

- FIFA World Cup third place: 2006

Individual

- kicker Bundesliga Team of the Season: 1998–99, 1999–2000, 2000–01, 2001–02
