= Jörg Reeb =

German footballer

Personal information
- Date of birth: 6 January 1972 (age 54)
- Place of birth: Saarbrücken, West Germany
- Height: 1.83 m (6 ft 0 in)
- Positions: Midfielder; defender

Team information
- Current team: ASC Dudweiler

Youth career
- SV Güdingen

Senior career*
Years	Team	Apps	(Gls)
1991–1995	1. FC Saarbrücken	64	(3)
1995–1998	Arminia Bielefeld	95	(6)
1998–2001	Bayer 04 Leverkusen	54	(1)
2001–2002	1. FC Köln	16	(0)
2002–2004	FC Augsburg	57	(17)
2004–2007	retired		
2007–2008	Sportfreunde Köllerbach		
2008–2010	ASC Dudweiler	64	(3)
- * Club domestic league appearances and goals

Jörg Reeb (born 6 January 1972 in Saarbrücken) is a former German footballer who last played for ASC Dudweiler.

== Honours ==
- Bundesliga runner-up: 1998–99, 1999–2000
