= Jermaine Jones =

American soccer player and coach (born 1981)

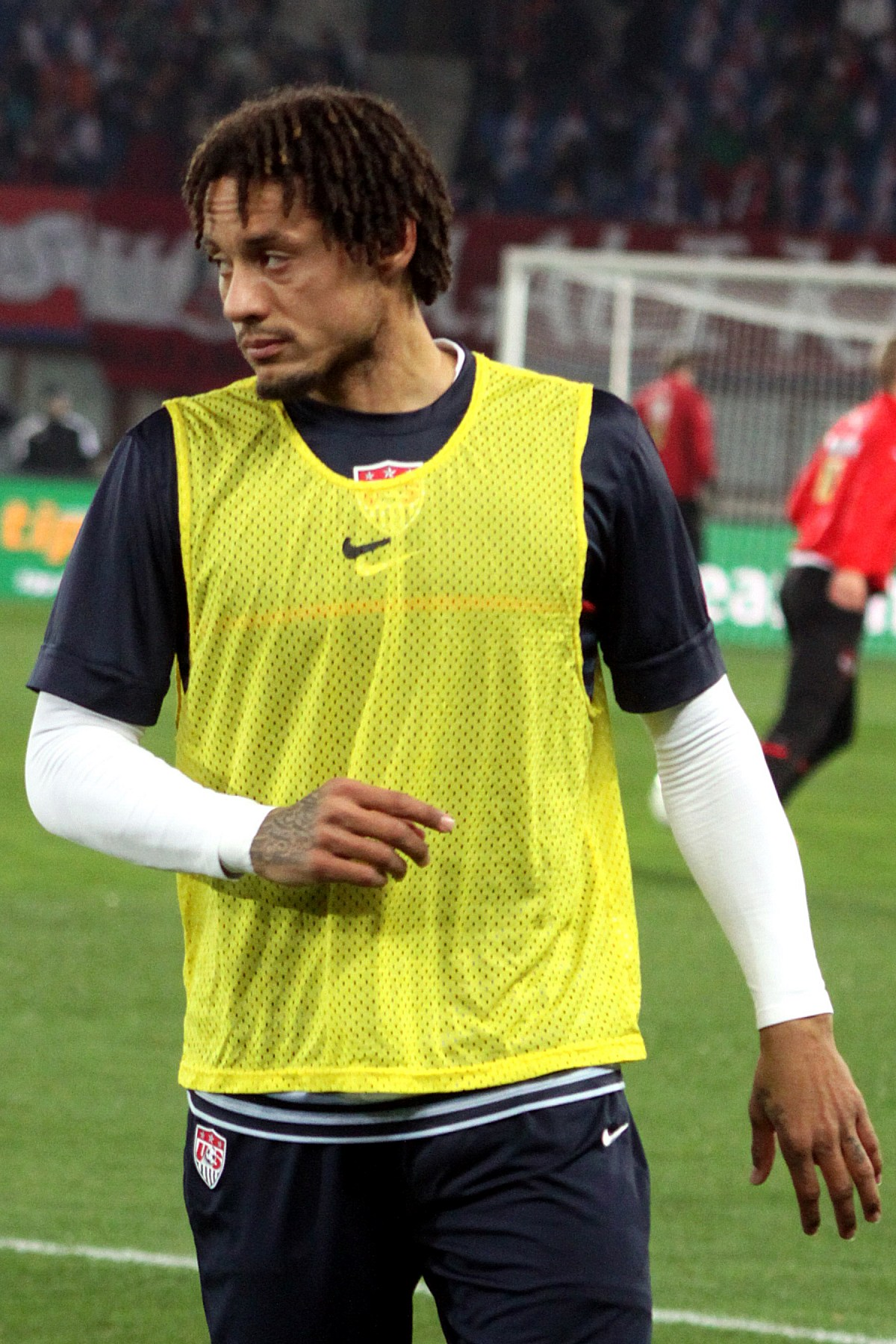
- Jones with the United States in 2013

Personal information
- Full name: Jermaine Junior Jones
- Date of birth: November 3, 1981 (age 45)
- Place of birth: Frankfurt, West Germany
- Height: 6 ft 0 in (1.84 m)
- Position: Defensive midfielder

Youth career
- 1988–1994: SV Bonames
- 1994–1995: FV Bad Vilbel
- 1995–1999: Eintracht Frankfurt

Senior career*
Years	Team	Apps	(Gls)
1999–2004	Eintracht Frankfurt II	31	(9)
1999–2004	Eintracht Frankfurt	46	(7)
2004–2005	Bayer Leverkusen II	15	(5)
2004–2005	Bayer Leverkusen	5	(0)
2005	→ Eintracht Frankfurt (loan)	14	(3)
2005–2007	Eintracht Frankfurt	24	(2)
2007–2014	Schalke 04	129	(7)
2011	→ Blackburn Rovers (loan)	15	(0)
2014	Beşiktaş	10	(0)
2014–2015	New England Revolution	28	(2)
2016	Colorado Rapids	9	(3)
2017	LA Galaxy	20	(1)
2018	Ventura County Fusion	1	(0)
2019–2020	Ontario Fury (indoor)	5	(10)
Total		347	(39)

International career
2001	Germany U20	4	(0)
2002–2003	Germany U21	8	(3)
2004	Germany B	1	(0)
2008	Germany	3	(0)
2010–2017	United States	69	(4)
2019	United States arena	1	(0)

Managerial career
- 2023–2024: Central Valley Fuego
- 2026: 1. FC Schweinfurt
Medal record
Representing United States
Men's Football
CONCACAF Gold Cup
Runner-up	2011 United States
CONCACAF Cup
Runner-up	2015 United States
- * Club domestic league appearances and goals

Jermaine Junior Jones (born November 3, 1981) is a professional soccer coach and former player who played as a defensive midfielder. Born in Germany, he represented the United States national team. He was most recently the head coach of 3. Liga club 1. FC Schweinfurt.

Born to an American father and German mother, he came up through the German club system and represented Germany at the U21 and senior level. However, he was not a regular in the team. He later filed for a switch to the United States national team. He made his debut for them in 2010 and played at the 2014 FIFA World Cup, scoring a notable goal against Portugal.

== Early life ==
Jones was born in Frankfurt and grew up in the city district of Bonames. His father is an African American former soldier for the U.S. Army who was stationed in West Germany and his mother is an ethnic German. As a child, Jones lived in Chicago, Illinois and Greenwood, Mississippi, before his parents divorced and he returned to Germany with his mother.

== Club career ==
=== Early career ===
Jones started his youth career at SV Bonames, moving to FV Bad Vilbel in 1994, at 12.

=== Eintracht Frankfurt ===
In 1995, he was recruited by Eintracht Frankfurt to play in their academy. He spent the next five years learning and building the quality of his game, and made his first appearance in the Eintracht Frankfurt II team in the 2000–01 season making 25 appearances and scoring eight goals. He made the step up to the main squad in 2001. Jones made 46 appearances for the Frankfurt senior team over two years in the 2001–2003 seasons, scoring seven goals as he was primarily played as a central defensive midfielder.

=== Bayer Leverkusen ===
His good form at the time saw him purchased by Bayer Leverkusen. First team chances were scarce though, so he played the majority of the 2004–05 Bundesliga season for Bayer Leverkusen II.

=== Eintracht Frankfurt ===
==== Second spell; loan ====
Jones re-signed for Eintracht Frankfurt on loan, barely six months after signing for Bayer Leverkusen. He made fourteen appearances and scored three goals.

==== Third spell; permanent deal ====
Before the start of the 2005–06 season, he signed a permanent deal with the Hesse based team. However, during that season, Jones suffered a serious leg injury that required surgery, and was out of the game for eight months, only returning in the first half of the last game of the season. Over the next two seasons, Jones shed his "teen idol" image, and established himself as a quality player and became captain of the squad.

In March 2007, Jones announced on the official Eintracht bulletin board that he would not extend his contract expiring at the end of the 2006–07 season. This enraged many Eintracht supporters, as Jones canceled a contract negotiation with chairman Heribert Bruchhagen a few days before it was scheduled to take place. In October 2006, he already had defended himself for turning down a contract offer, underlining he wanted to stay after all the management of the Eagles had done for him during his injuries. This led to him joining Schalke 04.

=== Schalke 04 ===
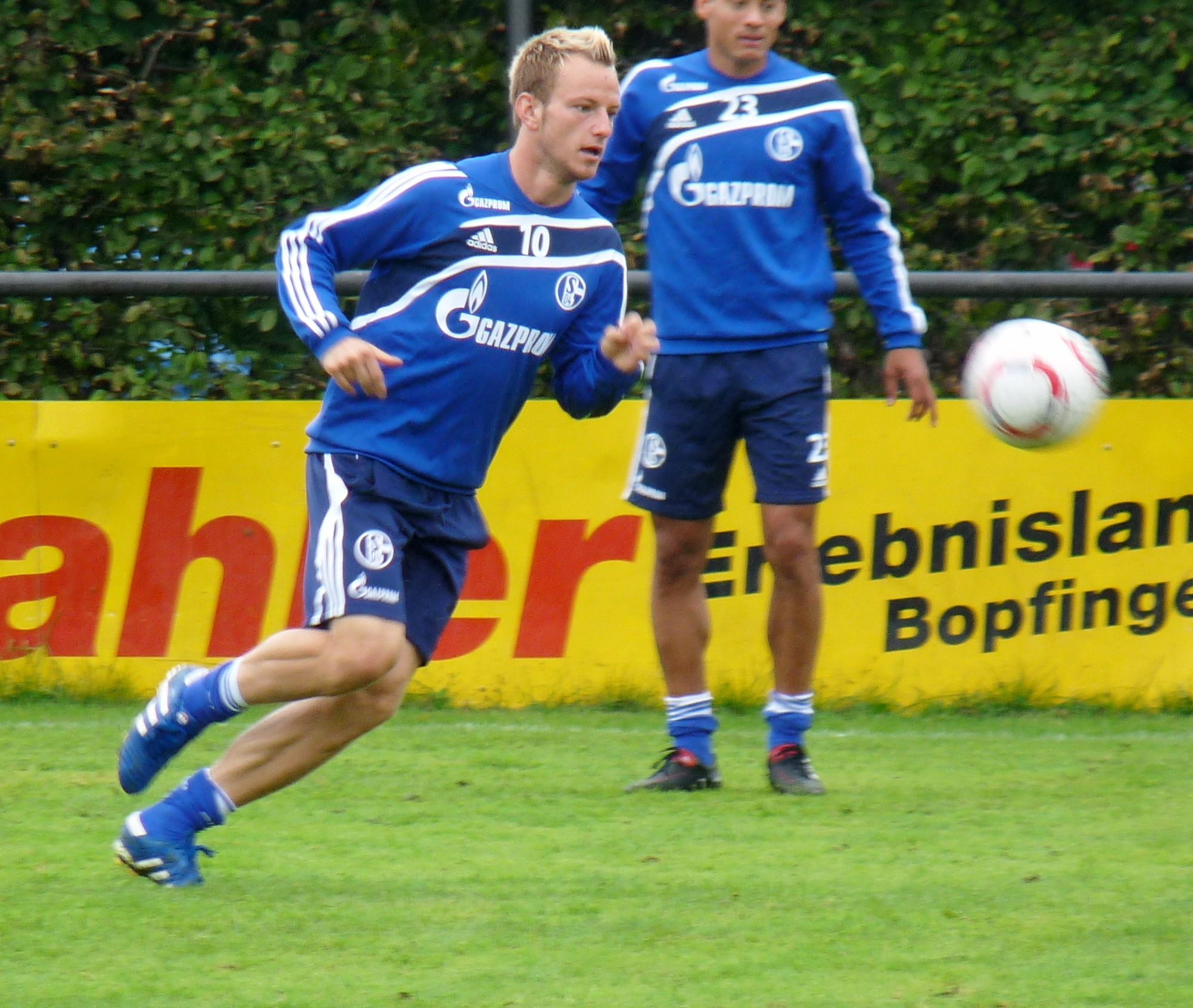
Jones training with Ivan Rakitić in 2011.

The following three seasons at Schalke 04 were relatively mixed for Jones, with his career being hit further by injuries including a muscular hairline crack injury which kept him out of the team for the majority of the 2009–10 season. However, he did enjoy his best stint playing regular games for the first time in his career playing 70 games in three seasons. The beginning of the 2010–11 season was again frustrating for Jones through lack of games, and after a falling out with team manager Felix Magath, he was sent to train with the reserves and made available for transfer.

==== Blackburn Rovers (loan) ====
On January 14, 2011, it was revealed that English Premier League team Blackburn Rovers were interested in taking Jones on loan with a view to making the signing permanent at the end of the season. With Rovers player Vince Grella's time at Rovers blighted by regular injury, the club had been looking for a defensive addition for some time, and Jones was thought to be an excellent addition to a newly developed squad under new Rovers manager Steve Kean. On January 15, Kean confirmed a deal would take place in the next week.

On January 18, 2011, it was confirmed by the club that Jones had signed on loan until the end of the season. He made his Premier League debut on January 23, 2011, starting in a 2–0 home win over West Bromwich Albion at Ewood Park and completed the full 90 minutes, receiving the man-of-the-match award on his first appearance for the club. On April 30, 2011, Jones put in another man-of-the-match display, playing the full 90 minutes in the derby game against Bolton Wanderers in a 1–0 win at Ewood Park. On May 22, 2011, against Wolverhampton Wanderers at Molineux, he completed the full 90 minutes in the last league match of the season in a 3–2 win for Rovers. He made 15 Premier League starts for Rovers and picked up eight yellow cards in total, becoming a firm fans favorite in the process.

=== Return to Schalke 04 ===
Following impressive performances with Blackburn, it was thought that he would extend his stay, but the two clubs could not agree a fee and he returned to Schalke 04 in July. In 2011, Schalke 04 appointed a new manager Ralf Rangnick and the new coach announced that he would give Jones a chance to stay at the club and fight for his spot because his contract runs until 2014 and guarantees the midfielder €12 million. Following his return from Blackburn, Jones became an integral part in defensive midfield and became an ever-present in the starting XI helping Schalke 04 fight for a Champions League berth and into the quarterfinals of the Europa League against Athletic Bilbao. In the club's second leg match against FC Twente in the Round of 16 on March 15, Jones scored a goal and provided an assist for one of Klaas-Jan Huntelaar's goals as Schalke 04 ran out 4–1 winners to overturn a 1–0 away defeat in the first leg.

On April 21, 2012, Jones got in a training round bust up with Dutch striker Klaas-Jan Huntelaar; the two traded blows and were then sent by general manager Horst Heldt to run extra laps around the field. The following day in a match against Augsburg that finished 1–1, Jones was accused of cheating because of rolling on the ground and clutching his face following a high challenge that only nicked his hand; his play acting was then compared to Rivaldo's infamous effort against Turkey at the World Cup in 2002. The following weekend, on April 28, Jones played 85 minutes in a 4–0 defeat of Hertha Berlin which certified Schalke's position in third spot and secured automatic qualification into the group stages of next year's Champions League.

Jones appeared in the Bundesliga 20 times during the 2011–12 season, making his last appearance in a 3–2 win over Werder Bremen on the final day of the season, playing the full 90 minutes. Following three games in the first two weeks of October in which Jones was a second-half substitute, two Bundesliga games and one Europa League fixture, Jones started every game in which he appeared, going the full 90 in almost all of them.

After picking up a yellow card which would rule Jones out for the return leg, he netted a well taken equalizer in Schalke 04's 1–1 draw with Galatasaray in the Champions League Round of 16 clash on February 20, 2013.

=== Beşiktaş ===
On January 30, 2014, he joined Turkish Süper Lig club Beşiktaş on a contract until the end of the season.

=== New England Revolution ===
On August 24, 2014, Jones agreed to terms with Major League Soccer, becoming a designated player on a salary of $4.7 million for 18 months. MLS held a blind draw between the Chicago Fire and New England Revolution to decide who would receive Jones' rights. New England won the draw, making Jones the fourth designated player in club history. He made his MLS debut on August 30, coming on as a 65th minute substitute in New England's 3–0 victory over Toronto FC. He made his first start, and home debut, on September 3 in a 3–1 victory over Sporting Kansas City. Jones scored his first career MLS goal, a game-winner, against Sporting Kansas City on September 26, 2014. Jones and the New England Revolution made it to the MLS Cup 2014 in Carson, California, but lost to the LA Galaxy 2–1 after extra time.

=== Colorado Rapids ===
After failing to agree on a new contract with New England, Jones was traded to Colorado Rapids on March 4, 2016, in exchange for a first-round selection in the 2017 MLS SuperDraft and general allocation money. On April 16, 2016, Jones made his Colorado Rapids debut and scored in a 2–1 win. Following three goals and two assists in four games, Jones was nominated for Major League Soccer's Player of the Month in April 2016.

=== LA Galaxy ===
On December 13, 2016, it was announced that LA Galaxy had acquired Jones' MLS rights in exchange for the Galaxy's first-round pick in the 2017 MLS SuperDraft and a second-round pick in the 2018 MLS SuperDraft. He was officially announced as a Galaxy player on January 18, 2017. His contract option was declined at the end of the season.

=== Ventura County Fusion ===
On July 14, 2018, Jones started and played all 90 minutes of Ventura County Fusion's USL PDL regular season finale against FC Golden State Force.

=== Ontario Fury ===
Jones returned to professional soccer on March 12, 2019, signing for the Ontario Fury of the Major Arena Soccer League. Jones joined the Fury just weeks after Landon Donovan signed with the San Diego Sockers. On February 20, 2020, Jones announced his retirement from playing professionally.

== Coaching career ==
He served as head coach of the Real So Cal U19 academy team in 2018.

Jones was named head coach of USL League One side Central Valley Fuego on November 6, 2023.

In October 2024, Jones was suspended by the USL for the remainder of the 2024 season after an independent investigation revealed Jones had harassed and threatened his players on multiple occasions.

In February 2026, he was named head coach of 1. FC Schweinfurt.

== International career ==
Jones broke through into the Eintracht Frankfurt squad, became a German Under-21 international and briefly became a fan favorite in Frankfurt.

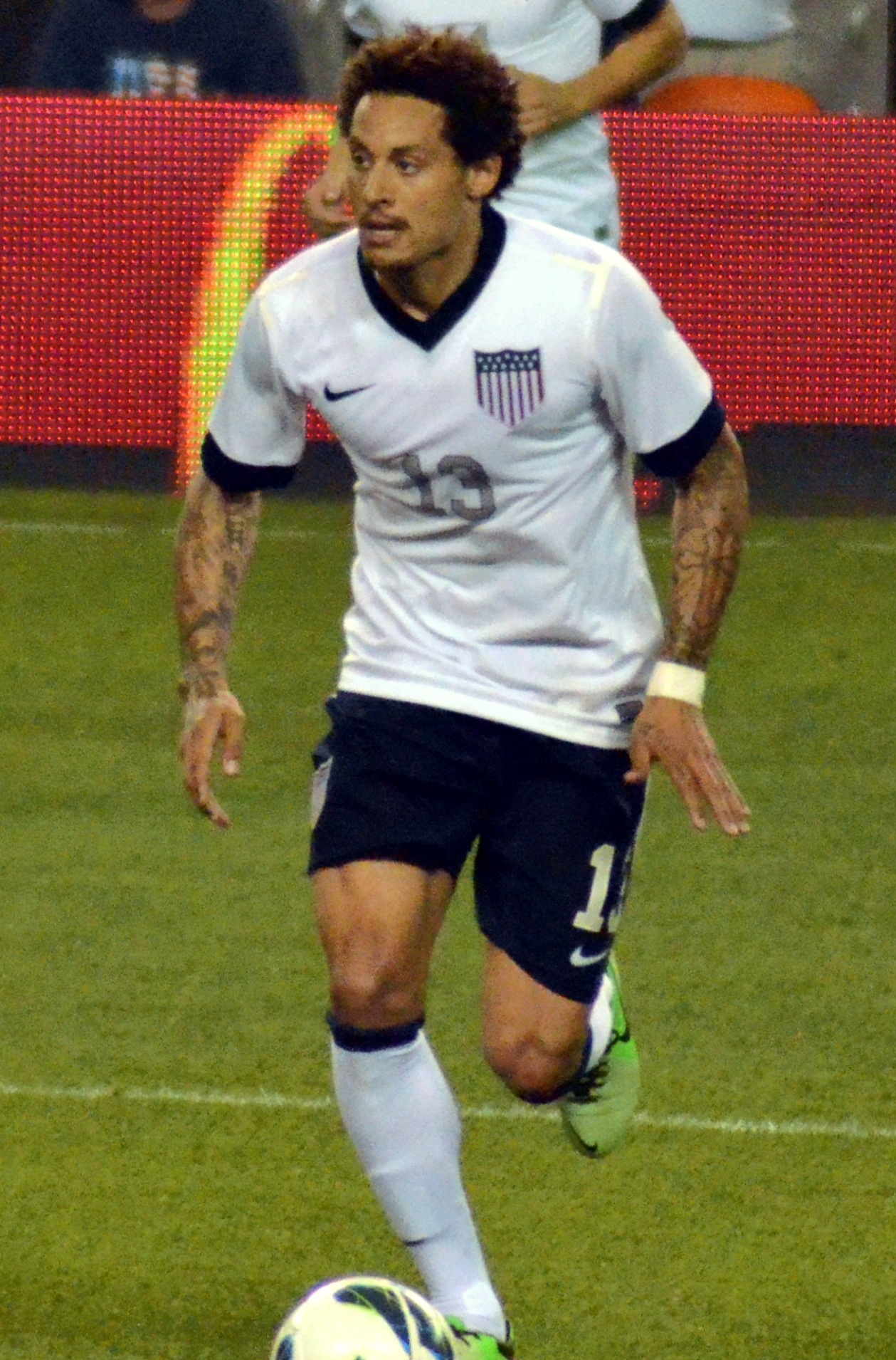
Jones playing for the United States in 2013

Though Jones played four matches with Germany's Under 21 team, he was often left out of the senior team, save a few friendlies with mostly reserves. In June 2009, Jones declared to the media that he would be available to play for the United States after it was clear to him that the Germany national team manager, Joachim Löw, did not have any plans for him in the current German set-up. Jones was eligible based on a new FIFA ruling allowing players to switch their national teams if the player had not yet played in an official FIFA match with the senior team despite having played at the youth level. Jones was eligible for the United States due to his dual German and American nationality.

On October 20, 2009, Jones was cleared by FIFA to join the United States national team. He first met with Bob Bradley and the national team during a March 2010 training camp and reportedly fit in "really well" according to Tim Howard. In the end, Jones did not recover from injury in time for the World Cup. On August 4, 2010, Jones was called into the United States squad for an August 10 friendly against Brazil. The next day, however, he withdrew from the squad due to fitness concerns related to his injury from the previous season. Jones was included on the roster for the U.S. national team's friendlies against Poland and Colombia in October. He made his debut for the United States against Poland and assisted Jozy Altidore on the game's opening goal in the 13th minute.

On June 19, 2011, Jones scored his first international goal in the 2011 CONCACAF Gold Cup against Jamaica. On January 21, 2012, he captained the side in the 1–0 win over Venezuela in a friendly match. On May 26, 2012, Jones scored his second international goal in a 5–1 victory over Scotland in a friendly match.

On June 16, 2014, Jones made his FIFA World Cup debut by starting and playing 90 minutes in a 2–1 victory over Ghana. In the next group stage game, with the U.S. down 1–0 against Portugal, Jones scored the equalizing goal with a curling strike from 25 yards out. The game ended in a 2–2 draw. Despite a 1–0 loss to Jones' native Germany in the final group stage match, the U.S. advanced to the round of 16. The U.S. were eventually eliminated in the knockout stage by Belgium 2–1.

In May 2016, he was among the 40 players selected for the U.S. 2016 Copa America preliminary roster and went on to be named the Man of the Match following a win against Costa Rica. Jones was the highest rated player for the U.S. for the Copa América Centenario in June 2016.

== Personal life ==
He married Sarah Gerthe in 2007. They have five children.

Gerthe filed a restraining order against Jones in early 2019, claiming he followed her around town and sent her "inappropriate, antagonistic and degrading messages." The couple filed for divorce in July 2019.

In 2018, a restraining order was filed against Jones by actor David Charvet who alleged that Jones stalked him and sent him threatening text messages.

He is a good friend of former soccer player and former manager of the Germany women's national soccer team Steffi Jones, who is also a German-American dual national and the child of an African-American soldier. They both played for the same club, SV Bonames, albeit not at the same time. The two are not related.

== Career statistics ==
=== Club ===
Appearances and goals by club, season and competition
Club	Season	League			National cup (Note: includes DFB-Pokal)		Continental		Other		Total	
Club	Season	Division	Apps	Goals	Apps	Goals	Apps	Goals	Apps	Goals	Apps	Goals
Eintracht Frankfurt	2000–01	Bundesliga	2	0	0	0	—		—		2	0
Eintracht Frankfurt	2001–02	2. Bundesliga	22	1	2	0	—		—		24	1
Eintracht Frankfurt	2002–03	2. Bundesliga	17	6	1	1	—		—		18	7
Eintracht Frankfurt	2003–04	Bundesliga	5	0	1	0	—		—		6	0
Eintracht Frankfurt	2004–05	2. Bundesliga	14	3	0	0	—		—		14	3
Eintracht Frankfurt	2005–06	Bundesliga	20	2	4	0	—		—		24	2
Eintracht Frankfurt	2006–07	Bundesliga	4	0	1	0	—		—		5	0
Eintracht Frankfurt	Total		84	12	9	1	—		—		93	13
Bayer Leverkusen	2004–05	Bundesliga	5	0	2	0	2 (Note: Appearances in UEFA Champions League)	0	—		9	0
Schalke 04	2007–08	Bundesliga	30	1	3	0	8	1	2 (Note: Appearances in DFL-Ligapokal)	0	43	2
Schalke 04	2008–09	Bundesliga	30	3	4	0	6 (Note: Two appearances in UEFA Champions League, four appearances in UEFA Cup)	0	—		40	3
Schalke 04	2009–10	Bundesliga	0	0	0	0	—		—		0	0
Schalke 04	2010–11	Bundesliga	10	1	2	0	4	0	0	0	16	1
Schalke 04	2011–12	Bundesliga	20	0	3	0	8 (Note: Appearances in UEFA Europa League)	1	0	0	31	1
Schalke 04	2012–13	Bundesliga	25	1	2	0	6	1	–		33	2
Schalke 04	2013–14	Bundesliga	14	1	3	0	5	0	—		22	1
Schalke 04	Total		129	7	17	0	37	3	2	0	185	10
Blackburn Rovers (loan)	2010–11	Premier League	15	0	0	0	—		—		15	0
Beşiktaş	2013–14	Süper Lig	10	0	0	0	—		—		10	0
New England Revolution	2014	MLS	10	2	0	0	—		5 (Note: Appearance(s) in MLS Cup playoffs)	1	15	3
New England Revolution	2015	MLS	18	0	0	0	—		1	0	19	0
New England Revolution	Total		28	2	0	0	—		6	1	34	3
Colorado Rapids	2016	MLS	9	3	0	0	—		4	0	13	3
LA Galaxy	2017	MLS	20	1	0	0	—		0	0	20	1
Ventura County Fusion	2018	PDL	1	0	—		—		—		1	0
Career total			301	25	28	1	39	3	12	1	380	30

=== International ===
Appearances and goals by national team and year
National team	Year	Apps	Goals
Germany	2008	3	0
Germany	Total	3	0
United States	2010	2	0
United States	2011	12	1
United States	2012	12	1
United States	2013	12	0
United States	2014	10	1
United States	2015	8	0
United States	2016	11	1
United States	2017	2	0
United States	Total	69	4
Career total		72	4

United States score listed first, score column indicates score after each Jones goal.

List of international goals scored by Jermaine Jones
No.	Date	Venue	Opponent	Score	Result	Competition
1	June 19, 2011	RFK Stadium, Washington, D.C., United States	Jamaica	1–0	2–0	2011 CONCACAF Gold Cup
2	May 26, 2012	EverBank Field, Jacksonville, United States	Scotland	5–1	5–1	Friendly
3	June 22, 2014	Arena da Amazônia, Manaus, Brazil	Portugal	1–1	2–2	2014 FIFA World Cup
4	June 7, 2016	Soldier Field, Chicago, United States	Costa Rica	2–0	4–0	Copa América Centenario

== Honors ==
Schalke 04

- DFB-Pokal: 2010–11
- DFL-Supercup: 2011

New England Revolution

- Eastern Conference Playoffs: 2014

United States

- CONCACAF Gold Cup runner-up: 2011
- CONCACAF Cup runner-up: 2015

== See also ==
- German-Americans
