= Stefan Lexa =

Austrian footballer

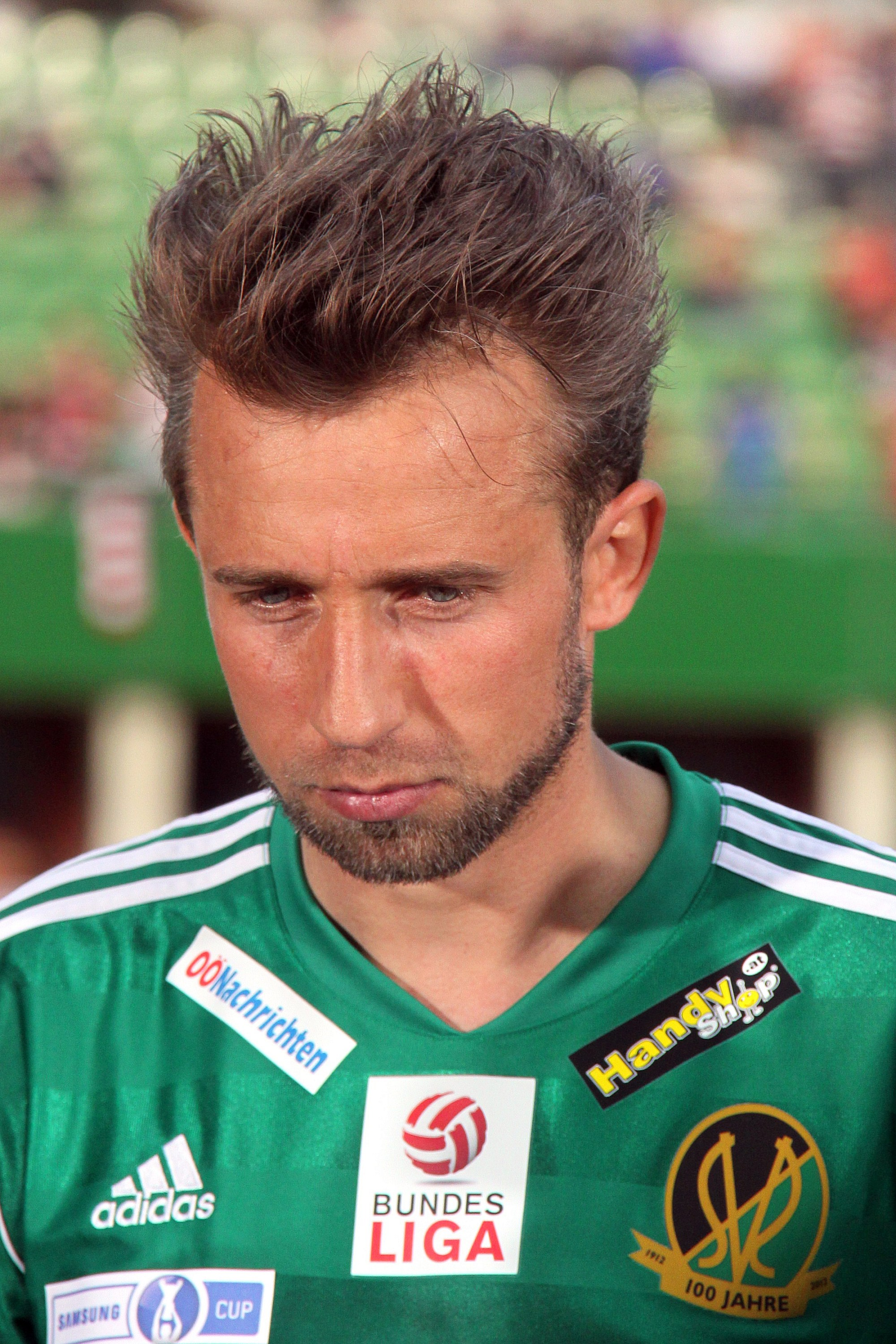
- Lexa in 2012

Personal information
- Date of birth: 1 November 1976 (age 50)
- Place of birth: Klagenfurt, Austria
- Height: 1.80 m (5 ft 11 in)
- Position: Right winger

Youth career
- 1983–1989: SV Heimstetten
- 1989–1995: 1860 Munich

Senior career*
Years	Team	Apps	(Gls)
1995–1996	SpVgg Landshut	22	(0)
1996	SV Heimstetten		
1996–1998	Wacker Burghausen	49	(2)
1998–1999	SV Wehen	31	(4)
1999–2001	SSV Reutlingen	59	(9)
2001–2002	SpVgg Unterhaching	28	(6)
2002–2003	CD Tenerife	11	(0)
2003–2006	Eintracht Frankfurt	56	(2)
2006–2007	1. FC Kaiserslautern	24	(1)
2007	1. FC Kaiserslautern II	4	(0)
2008	1. FC Kaiserslautern	15	(0)
2008–2012	SV Ried	121	(13)
2012–2013	SV Grödig	34	(4)
Total		454	(41)

International career
2001–2009	Austria	6	(0)
- * Club domestic league appearances and goals

Stefan Lexa (born 1 November 1976) is an Austrian former professional footballer who played as a right winger.

== Club career ==
Much-travelled Lexa was born in Klagenfurt but was raised in Germany. At the age of seven years he started at SV Heimstetten. As youth player he also played for TSV 1860 Munich. He spent a couple of years in the 2. Bundesliga before winning promotion to the Bundesliga with Eintracht Frankfurt after he got relegated with them the season before. With Eintracht he also lost the 2006 DFB-Pokal final. After that final he moved back to the 2. Bundesliga to play for 1. FC Kaiserslautern before making his debut in the Austrian Football Bundesliga with SV Ried in 2008. In 2002–03, he also played 11 games for Segunda División side CD Tenerife.

The Carinthian was classified as a good dribbler and mostly played on the right wing.

== International career ==
Lexa debuted for Austria in an October 2001 World Cup qualification match against Israel under manager Otto Barić. He was capped six times, in doing so not being capped for four years between 2002 and 2006. His last international was a May 2006 friendly match against Croatia.

== Career statistics ==
Appearances and goals by national team and year
National team	Year	Apps	Goals
Austria	2001	3	0
Austria	2002	1	0
Austria	2003	0	0
Austria	2004	0	0
Austria	2005	0	0
Austria	2006	1	0
Austria	2007	0	0
Austria	2008	0	0
Austria	2009	1	0
Total		6	0

== Honours ==
Eintracht Frankfurt

- DFB-Pokal: runner-up 2005–06

SV Grödig

- Erste Liga: 2012–13
