= Jurica Puljiz =

Croatian footballer (born 1979)

Personal information
- Full name: Jurica Puljiz
- Date of birth: 13 December 1979 (age 46)
- Place of birth: Imotski, SR Croatia, SFR Yugoslavia
- Height: 1.85 m (6 ft 1 in)
- Position: Defender

Senior career*
| Years | Team | Apps | (Gls) |
| 1999–2002 | Hajduk Split | 26 | (1) |
| 2002–2003 | Šibenik | 15 | (2) |
| 2003–2006 | Eintracht Frankfurt | 15 | (1) |
| 2006 | Široki Brijeg | 2 | (1) |
| 2007 | SCR Altach | 8 | (0) |
| 2007–2008 | Zorya Luhansk | 10 | (1) |
| 2008–2009 | Zrinjski Mostar | 5 | (0) |
| 2009 | Flamurtari Vlorë | 14 | (0) |
| 2009–2010 | Taraz | 0 | (0) |
| 2010 | Liepājas Metalurgs | 15 | (2) |
| 2011–2013 | Jadran LP | 28 | (3) |

International career
| 1998–1999 | Croatia U-20 | 2 | (0) |
- * Club domestic league appearances and goals as of 19 May 2010

Jurica Puljiz (born 13 December 1979) is a Croatian retired football defender who last played for NK Jadran Luka Ploče.

== Career ==
Born in Imotski, Puljiz started to play for Hajduk Split at the age of ten and stayed in the club until 2002, when he went on to play one season for HNK Šibenik before signing with Eintracht Frankfurt in the summer of 2003. He played in 15 Bundesliga matches and scored one goal for Eintracht. Puljiz was about to sign a long-term contract with Eintracht but got severely injured, keeping him out of the game for almost two years.

He also played for NK Široki Brijeg, defending champions of Bosnia and Herzegovina, until December 2006. In January 2009, he left for HŠK Zrinjski Mostar. In August 2010, he signed a contract with that time Latvian champions FK Liepājas Metalurgs. He played 15 matches in the LMT Virsliga, scoring two goals. He also played two matches in the Champions League qualification in 2010, when Metalurgs were both times beaten by the Czech giants Sparta Praha. He was released by Liepāja after the season ended.
