= Chris (footballer) =

Brazilian footballer (born 1978)

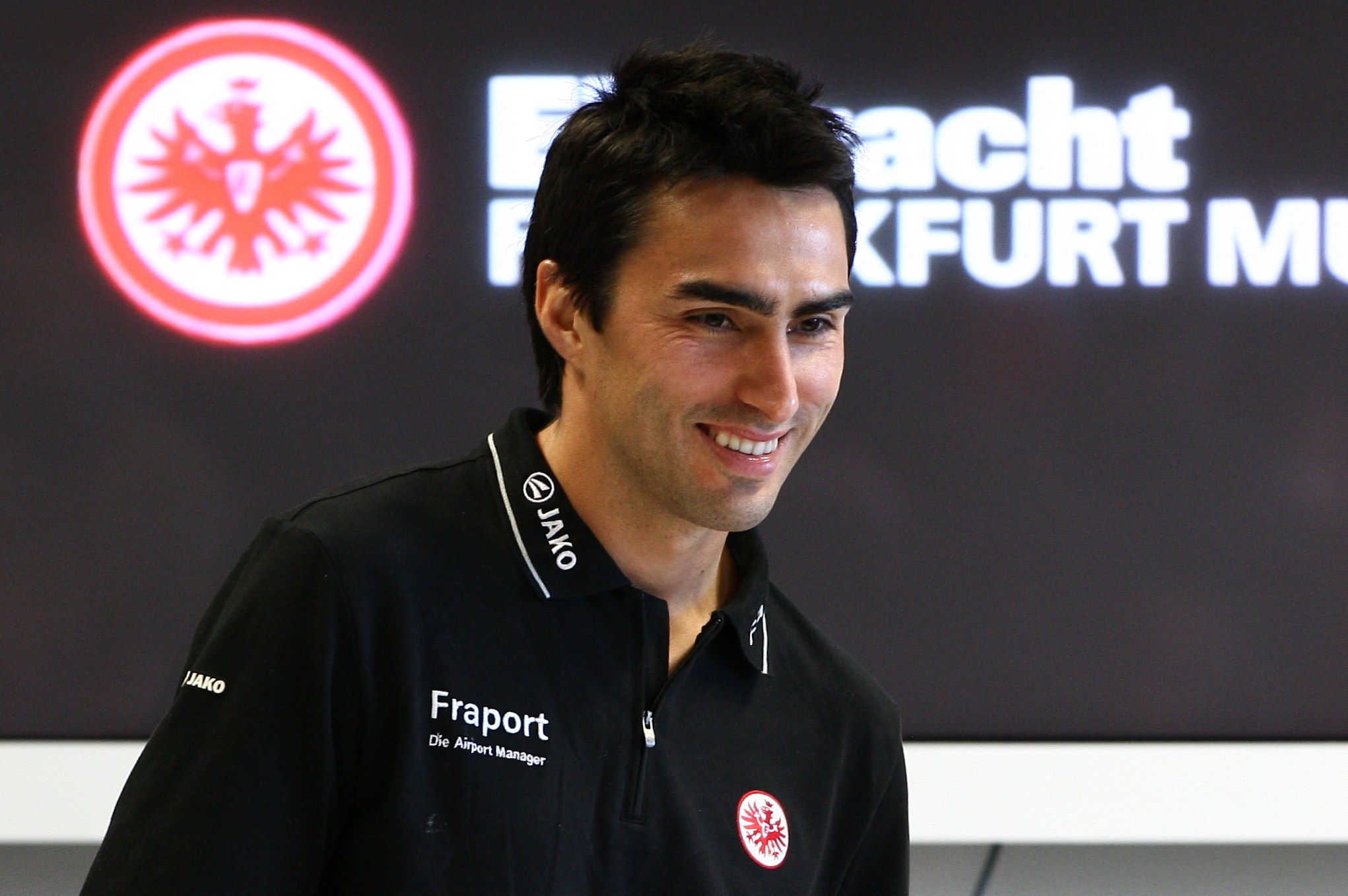
- Chris in 2010

Personal information
- Full name: Christian Maicon Hening
- Date of birth: 25 August 1978 (age 48)
- Place of birth: Blumenau, Brazil
- Height: 1.85 m (6 ft 1 in)
- Positions: Centre-back; defensive midfielder

Youth career
- –1999: Timbo EC

Senior career*
Years	Team	Apps	(Gls)
1999	Democrata		
1999–2000	Timbo		
2001	Botafogo (SP)		
2001	Coritiba	16	(0)
2002	Internacional	13	(2)
2003	FC St. Pauli	13	(3)
2003–2011	Eintracht Frankfurt	158	(14)
2006	Eintracht Frankfurt II	1	(0)
2011–2012	VfL Wolfsburg	8	(1)
2012–	1899 Hoffenheim	0	(0)
2013	1899 Hoffenheim II	1	(0)
- * Club domestic league appearances and goals

Christian Maicon Hening (born 25 August 1978), better known under the nickname Chris, is a Brazilian former professional footballer who played as a centre-back or defensive midfielder, notably for Eintracht Frankfurt from 2003 to 2011. He was named club captain of Eintracht Frankfurt prior to the 2010–11 season.
