= Mehmet Dragusha =

Albanian footballer

Personal information
- Full name: Mehmet Ashim Dragusha
- Date of birth: 9 October 1977 (age 49)
- Place of birth: Pristina, SFR Yugoslavia
- Height: 1.80 m (5 ft 11 in)
- Position: Left midfielder

Youth career
- KF Beselidhja

Senior career*
Years	Team	Apps	(Gls)
1994–1998	Prishtina		
1998–2000	Maribor	13	(2)
2000–2001	Sachsen Leipzig	62	(8)
2001–2003	Eintracht Trier	19	(1)
2003–2005	Eintracht Frankfurt	31	(2)
2005–2007	SC Paderborn	28	(1)
2007–2008	SV Elversberg	1	(0)
2008–2009	1. FC Magdeburg	27	(2)

International career
2002	Kosovo	1	(0)
2003–2005	Albania	10	(1)
- * Club domestic league appearances and goals

Mehmet Ashim Dragusha (born 9 October 1977) is a former professional footballer who played as a midfielder. Born in Yugoslavia, he represented Albania internationally.

== Club career ==
Born in Pristina, Dragusha began his career with local side FC Prishtina. In 1997, he moved to the Slovenian club Maribor before joining German side FC Sachsen Leipzig in 2000. He went on to play for Eintracht Trier and in the Bundesliga for Eintracht Frankfurt. He played 134 matches and scored 12 goals.

== International career ==
Dragusha received the Albanian cititzenship on 6 March 2003 along Lorik Cana. Between 2003 and 2005, he played ten international games with Albania, scoring a single goal.

== Career statistics ==
Appearances and goals by national team and year
National team	Year	Apps	Goals
Albania	2003	4	1
Albania	2004	5	0
Albania	2005	1	0
Total		10	1
