= Markus Kreuz =

German footballer (born 1977)

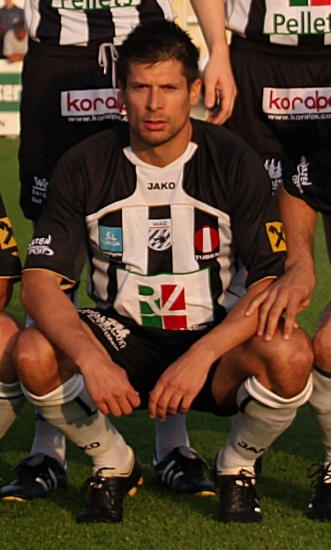
- Kreuz in 2010

Personal information
- Date of birth: 29 April 1977 (age 49)
- Place of birth: Ingelheim, West Germany
- Position: Midfielder

Youth career
- 1982–1991: VfL Frei-Weinheim
- 1991–1992: Mainz 05
- 1992–1993: 1. FC Kaiserslautern
- 1993–1995: Mainz 05

Senior career*
Years	Team	Apps	(Gls)
1995–1998	Mainz 05	11	(0)
1998–2000	Hannover 96	85	(17)
2000–2003	1. FC Köln	73	(8)
2003–2004	Eintracht Frankfurt	30	(1)
2004–2005	FC Rot-Weiss Erfurt	24	(1)
2005–2006	Real Murcia	17	(0)
2006–2007	Kickers Offenbach	20	(0)
2007–2009	FSV Frankfurt	54	(4)
2009–2012	WAC St. Andrä	78	(11)
2012–2015	TSV Schott Mainz		

International career
1998–1999	Germany U-21	9	(0)
1998	Germany Olympic	1	(0)
2002	Germany Team 2006	1	(0)
- * Club domestic league appearances and goals

Markus Kreuz (born 29 April 1977) is a German former professional footballer who played as a midfielder.

== Career ==
Kreuz played professionally for 1. FSV Mainz 05, 1. FC Kaiserslautern, Hannover 96, 1. FC Köln, Eintracht Frankfurt, FC Rot-Weiss Erfurt, Real Murcia, Kickers Offenbach and FSV Frankfurt, and WAC St. Andrä.

== Personal life ==
In 2015, Kreuz returned to youth club VfL Frei-Weinheim as a playing assistant manager.
