= Henning Bürger =

German footballer

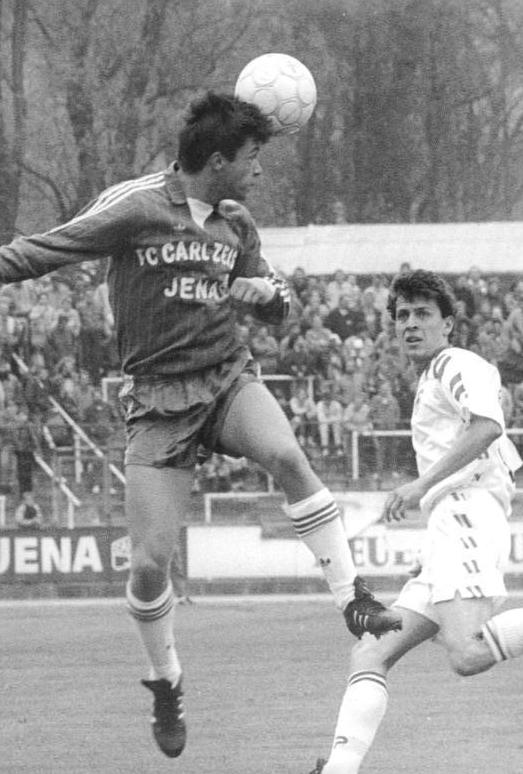
- Bürger with Carl Zeiss Jena in 1990

Personal information
- Date of birth: 16 December 1969 (age 56)
- Place of birth: Zeulenroda-Triebes, East Germany
- Height: 1.74 m (5 ft 9 in)
- Position: Midfielder

Youth career
- –1984: BSG Motor Zeulenroda
- 1984–1988: Carl Zeiss Jena

Senior career*
Years	Team	Apps	(Gls)
1988	Wismut Gera	28	(4)
1989–1991	Carl Zeiss Jena	53	(4)
1991–1992	Schalke 04	5	(0)
1992–1995	1. FC Saarbrücken	85	(2)
1996–1999	1. FC Nürnberg	44	(1)
1999–2002	FC St. Pauli	64	(1)
2002–2004	Eintracht Frankfurt	53	(1)
2004–2005	Rot-Weiß Erfurt	24	(0)
Total		356	(13)

Managerial career
- 2005–2007: Carl Zeiss Jena (youth)
- 2007–2008: Carl Zeiss Jena
- 2010–2011: FC Ingolstadt 04 (assistant)
- 2011–2018: Eintracht Braunschweig II
- 2015–2016: Eintracht Braunschweig (assistant)
- 2018–2019: VfL Wolfsburg (U17 assistant)
- 2019–2020: VfL Wolfsburg (U19)
- 2020–2021: VfL Wolfsburg II
- 2022: Carl Zeiss Jena (academy)
- 2022: Carl Zeiss Jena (U17)
- 2022: Carl Zeiss Jena (caretaker)
- 2024–2025: Carl Zeiss Jena
- * Club domestic league appearances and goals

Henning Bürger (born 16 December 1969) is a German professional football coach and a former player. As a player, he spent three seasons in the DDR-Oberliga with FC Carl Zeiss Jena, as well as five seasons in the Bundesliga with FC Schalke 04, 1. FC Saarbrücken, 1. FC Nürnberg, FC St. Pauli, and Eintracht Frankfurt.

== Coaching career ==
Bürger took over as manager of then 2. Bundesliga side FC Carl Zeiss Jena in 2008, but could not prevent the club's relegation to the 3. Liga at the end of the season. He was released by Jena after a 0–6 defeat on 14 September 2008 against VfB Stuttgart II. Since 2011, Bürger manages the reserve side of Eintracht Braunschweig. During the 2015–16 season, Bürger additionally worked as assistant coach of Eintracht's first team.
