= Nico Frommer =

German footballer

Personal information
- Date of birth: 8 April 1978 (age 48)
- Place of birth: Ulm, West Germany
- Height: 1.83 m (6 ft 0 in)
- Position: Striker

Youth career
- 1983–1988: TSV Neu-Ulm
- 1988–1995: SSV Ulm

Senior career*
Years	Team	Apps	(Gls)
1995–1997	SSV Ulm	32	(3)
1997–1999	VfB Stuttgart (A)	46	(17)
1998–2000	VfB Stuttgart	8	(0)
1999–2000	→ Borussia M'gladbach (loan)	18	(3)
2000–2003	SSV Reutlingen	72	(31)
2003–2006	Eintracht Frankfurt	26	(2)
2005	→ RW Oberhausen (loan)	14	(4)
2006–2007	SpVgg Unterhaching	10	(1)
2007–2009	VfL Osnabrück	52	(5)
2009–2011	RB Leipzig	42	(19)
2011–2013	1. FC Heidenheim	16	(6)
Total		336	(91)

International career
1998–1999	Germany U-21	7	(1)
2002–2003	Germany B	2	(0)
Medal record
VfB Stuttgart
Runner-up	DFB-Ligapokal	1998
RB Leipzig
Winner	NOFV-Oberliga	2010
Winner	Sachsenpokal	2011
- * Club domestic league appearances and goals

Nico Frommer (born 8 April 1978 in Ulm, West Germany) is a German former professional footballer who played as a striker.
