= Heribert Bruchhagen =

German football official (born 1948)

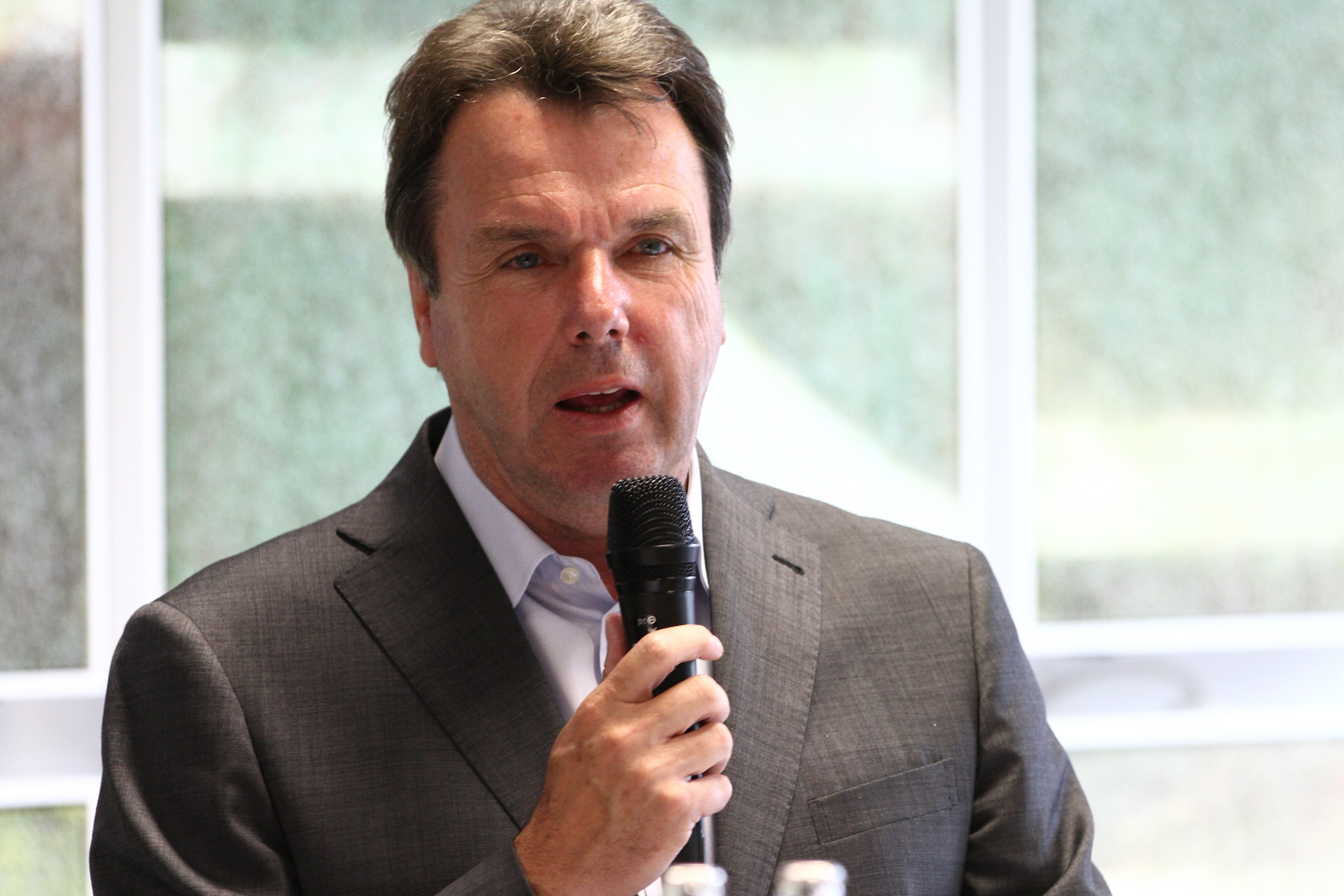
- Bruchhagen with Frankfurt in 2011

Personal information
- Date of birth: 4 September 1948 (age 78)
- Place of birth: Düsseldorf-Derendorf, Allied-occupied Germany
- Position: Forward

Team information
- Current team: Hamburger SV (chairman)

Youth career
- TSG Harsewinkel

Senior career*
| Years | Team | Apps | (Gls) |
| 1968–1978 | DJK Gütersloh | | |
| 1978–1982 | FC Gütersloh | | |

Managerial career
- 1982–1988: FC Gütersloh
- 1988: SC Verl
- 1988–1992: Schalke 04 (commercial manager)
- 1992–1995: Hamburger SV (commercial manager)
- 1998–2001: Arminia Bielefeld (commercial manager)
- 2001–2003: DFB (CEO)
- 2003–2011: Eintracht Frankfurt (sporting director)
- 2003: Eintracht Frankfurt (chairman)
- 2007–: DFB (board member)
- * Club domestic league appearances and goals

Heribert Bruchhagen (born 4 September 1948) is the chairman of Hamburger SV since 2016.

== Career ==
Bruchhagen was born in Düsseldorf-Derendorf. As a player he played from 1968 until 1982 for DJK Gütersloh, which he subsequently managed from 1982 until 1988. After that he had a short managing stint with SC Verl.

From 1988 until 1992 he was general manager at Schalke 04. From 1992 until 1995 he worked in the same position for Hamburger SV and from 1998 until 2001 for Arminia Bielefeld. After that stint, Bruchhagen was CEO for competition at the Deutsche Fußball Liga.

From 2003 he was sport director of Eintracht Frankfurt, working hard for the financial rehabilitation and stability of the club.

Bruchhagen is teacher for sports and geography and taught from 1977 until 1986 in Halle, Westphalia.

In August 2007, he was elected to the board of the Bundesliga execution. Bruchhagen is widely known for his eloquent interviews, often criticizing the commercialisation in modern football and does not hesitate to counteract against ones like Bayern Munich chairman Karl-Heinz Rummenigge.
