= Marko Babić (footballer) =

Croatian footballer (born 1981)

Personal information
- Date of birth: 28 January 1981 (age 45)
- Place of birth: Osijek, SR Croatia, Yugoslavia
- Height: 1.86 m (6 ft 1 in)
- Positions: Left midfielder; left-back

Youth career
- –1997: Osijek

Senior career*
Years	Team	Apps	(Gls)
1997–1999	Osijek	16	(0)
2000–2007	Bayer Leverkusen	144	(13)
2007–2009	Real Betis	12	(0)
2009	Hertha BSC	8	(0)
2009–2010	Real Zaragoza	14	(0)
2010–2012	Osijek	26	(4)
2013	LASK Linz	8	(0)
Total		228	(17)

International career
2002–2008	Croatia	49	(3)

Managerial career
- 2017: Olympiacos (assistant)
- 2019: Čelik Zenica
- 2019–2020: Rudeš
- 2022: Ilirija 1911
- * Club domestic league appearances and goals

Marko Babić (born 28 January 1981) is a Croatian football manager and former professional footballer. He primarily played as left midfielder, but was also often deployed as a left-back.

Babić began his senior career with Osijek in 1997. However, he only made 16 league appearances before moving to Germany to join Bayer Leverkusen. He became a regular for the club, and made 144 league appearances before joining Spanish side Real Betis. He was less successful here, and made 12 league appearances in two years, while his spells at Hertha BSC and Real Zaragoza were brief. In 2010, Babić returned to Osijek, but struggled to re-establish himself, and made just 26 league appearances in two years. A switch to LASK Linz followed in 2013, but this yielded just eight league matches before he left the club and afterwards retiring from professional football.

Having represented Croatia at under-15, under-17, under-18, under-19, and under-20 levels between 1996 and 2001, Babić made his under-21 and senior international debut in 2002, and made 49 appearances for the senior international appearances. However, he was omitted from Croatia's UEFA Euro 2008 squad, and did not play for the national team ever again.

After finishing his playing career, he became a manager, working as an assistant manager at Olympiacos in 2017. In 2019 he managed Bosnian Premier League club Čelik Zenica. Between 2019 and 2020, he was the manager of Rudeš.

== Club career ==
Babić made his debut with hometown club NK Osijek, where he spent three seasons. In 2000, Babić completed his move to Bayer Leverkusen where he joined the German outfit's Croatian contingent. He played for the club during their loss to Real Madrid in the 2002 Champions League final. Babić was offered a new contract in 2003.

Real Betis presented the player to the press and fans on 17 July 2007. Early reports suggested he had signed on a free transfer as his contract had ended. On 23 July 2007, Babić made his Betis debut in a friendly match against San Fernando. His competitive debut came in the La Liga season against Recreativo de Huelva on 26 August 2007.

In January 2009, Babić left Spain to play for Hertha BSC on a free transfer and gave up the non-EU quota to Ricardo Oliveira. He left Hertha six months later. On 8 August 2009, he signed a two-year contract with Real Zaragoza. On 6 September 2010 his contract was terminated. On 2 March 2011, Babić signed a one-and-a-half-year contract with former club Osijek. After leaving Osijek in 2012, he signed with Austrian club LASK Linz, for who he played until 2013, after which he decided to retire from professional football at the age of 32.

== International career ==
Babić made his Croatia national team debut in May 2002 against Hungary. He was part of the Croatian squad at UEFA Euro 2004, but did not make an appearance.

He played all three matches at the 2006 FIFA World Cup, stationed as a left wing-back in a 3–5–2 formation. He was a surprise omission from Slaven Bilić's Euro 2008 squad.

== Managerial career ==
=== Early career ===
Babić started off his managerial career in June 2017, being appointed as an assistant manager of Besnik Hasi at Olympiacos. He stayed at Olympiacos until September of the same year, before leaving the club after Hasi got sacked.

=== Čelik Zenica ===
On 5 September 2019, Babić got his first managerial position, being appointed as the new manager of Bosnian Premier League club Čelik Zenica. In his first game as the club's manager, Čelik beat Mladost Doboj Kakanj at home 1–0 in a league match. His first loss as Čelik manager was in a cup game against Rudar Kakanj on 18 September 2019, in which Čelik surprisingly lost 3–0 away in Kakanj.

Less than a month after being named manager, on 30 September 2019, Babić left Čelik after making some poor results and not being in good contact with the players of the club.

=== Rudeš ===
On 7 October 2019, it was announced that Babić was named the new manager of 2. HNL club Rudeš.

=== Ilirija 1911 ===
In January 2022, Babić became the new head coach of Slovenian Second League side Ilirija 1911.

== Career statistics ==
=== International goals ===
Scores and results list Croatia's goal tally first, score column indicates score after each Babić goal.

List of international goals scored by Marko Babić
No.	Date	Venue	Opponent	Score	Result	Competition
1	4 June 2005	Vasil Levski National Stadium, Sofia, Bulgaria	Bulgaria	1–0	3–1	2006 World Cup qualifiers
2	23 May 2006	Ernst-Happel-Stadion, Vienna, Austria	Austria	3–1	4–1	Friendly
3	28 May 2006	Gradski vrt, Osijek, Croatia	Iran	2–2	2–2	Friendly

== Managerial statistics ==
As of 31 May 2022

Managerial record by team and tenure
Team	From	To	Record				
Team	From	To	P	W	D	L	Win %
Čelik Zenica	5 September 2019	30 September 2019	5	1	1	3	20.00
Rudeš	7 October 2019	30 June 2020	10	3	3	4	30.00
Ilirija 1911	3 January 2022	31 May 2022	12	6	3	3	50.00
Total			27	10	7	10	37.04

== Honours ==
=== Player ===
Osijek

- Croatian Cup: 1998–99, runner-up: 2011–12

Bayer Leverkusen

- Bundesliga runner-up: 2001–02
- DFB-Pokal runner-up: 2001–02
- UEFA Champions League runner-up: 2001–02
