= Markus Beierle =

German footballer (1972–2026)

Personal information
- Date of birth: 2 June 1972
- Place of birth: Brackenheim, Baden-Württemberg, West Germany
- Date of death: 14 July 2026 (aged 54)
- Height: 1.83 m (6 ft 0 in)
- Position: Striker

Youth career
- TSV Cleebronn
- Union Böckingen

Senior career*
Years	Team	Apps	(Gls)
1990–1993	VfB Stuttgart (A)	92	(31)
1992–1993	VfB Stuttgart	0	(0)
1993–1995	SSV Ulm	63	(29)
1995–1998	Stuttgarter Kickers	55	(16)
1998–2000	MSV Duisburg	59	(21)
2000–2001	1860 Munich	18	(2)
2001–2002	Hansa Rostock	26	(5)
2003–2005	Eintracht Frankfurt	50	(13)
2005–2007	Darmstadt 98	44	(12)
Total		407	(129)
- * Club domestic league appearances and goals

Markus Beierle (2 June 1972 – 14 July 2026) was a German professional footballer who played as a striker.

== Career ==
Beierle was born in Brackenheim. His career began at TSV Cleebronn and Union Böckingen. Professional scouts became interested in his talents, and in 1992 he signed a contract with VfB Stuttgart. A year later, the qualified mechanic signed for SSV Ulm, before becoming a full club member of Stuttgarter Kickers in 1995.

In 1998 the player moved to his first top-tier squad, MSV Duisburg. After two years of great contrasts with the team he moved to subsequent Champions League qualifiers 1860 Munich. Subsequent to their qualification he moved to Hansa Rostock, before moving to Eintracht Frankfurt in the winter of 2003.

Finding himself very much out of the plans of Friedhelm Funkel while they were both still very early on in their careers at the club, Beierle looked for a new footballing challenge, which he found with Bruno Labbadia at Darmstadt. As the first of Labaddia's top-name arrivals at the lilies, he was hoping for a swift rise into the top division.

== Death ==
Beierle died on 14 July 2026, at the age of 54.
