= Geri Çipi =

Albanian footballer

Personal information
- Date of birth: 28 February 1976 (age 50)
- Place of birth: Vlorë, Albania
- Height: 1.95 m (6 ft 5 in)
- Position: Centre-back

Youth career
- Flamurtari
- Vllaznia

Senior career*
Years	Team	Apps	(Gls)
1992–1998	Flamurtari	85	(2)
1998–2000	Maribor	42	(2)
2000–2003	Gent	76	(2)
2003	Eintracht Frankfurt	13	(0)
2004	Rot-Weiß Oberhausen	11	(0)
2004–2005	Tirana	14	(0)
Total		241	(6)

International career
1995–2005	Albania	34	(0)
- * Club domestic league appearances and goals

Geri Çipi (born 28 February 1976) is an Albanian former professional footballer who played as a centre-back. He notably played 76 games for Gent from 2000 to 2003, and was part of the Albania national team from 1995 to 2005. After establishing himself at Flamurtari during the early 1990s, Çipi moved to Maribor in the summer of 1998.

== International career ==
Çipi made his debut for Albania in a November 1995 friendly match against Bosnia and Herzegovina and earned a total of 34 caps, scoring no goals. His final international was a June 2005 FIFA World Cup qualification match against Georgia.

== Personal life ==
His uncle Kreshnik also played for Flamurtari and the national team.

== Career statistics ==
Albania national team
Year	Apps	Goals
1995	1	0
2000	8	0
2001	7	0
2002	3	0
2003	10	0
2004	2	0
2005	3	0
Total	34	0
