= Ingo Hertzsch =

German footballer (born 1977)

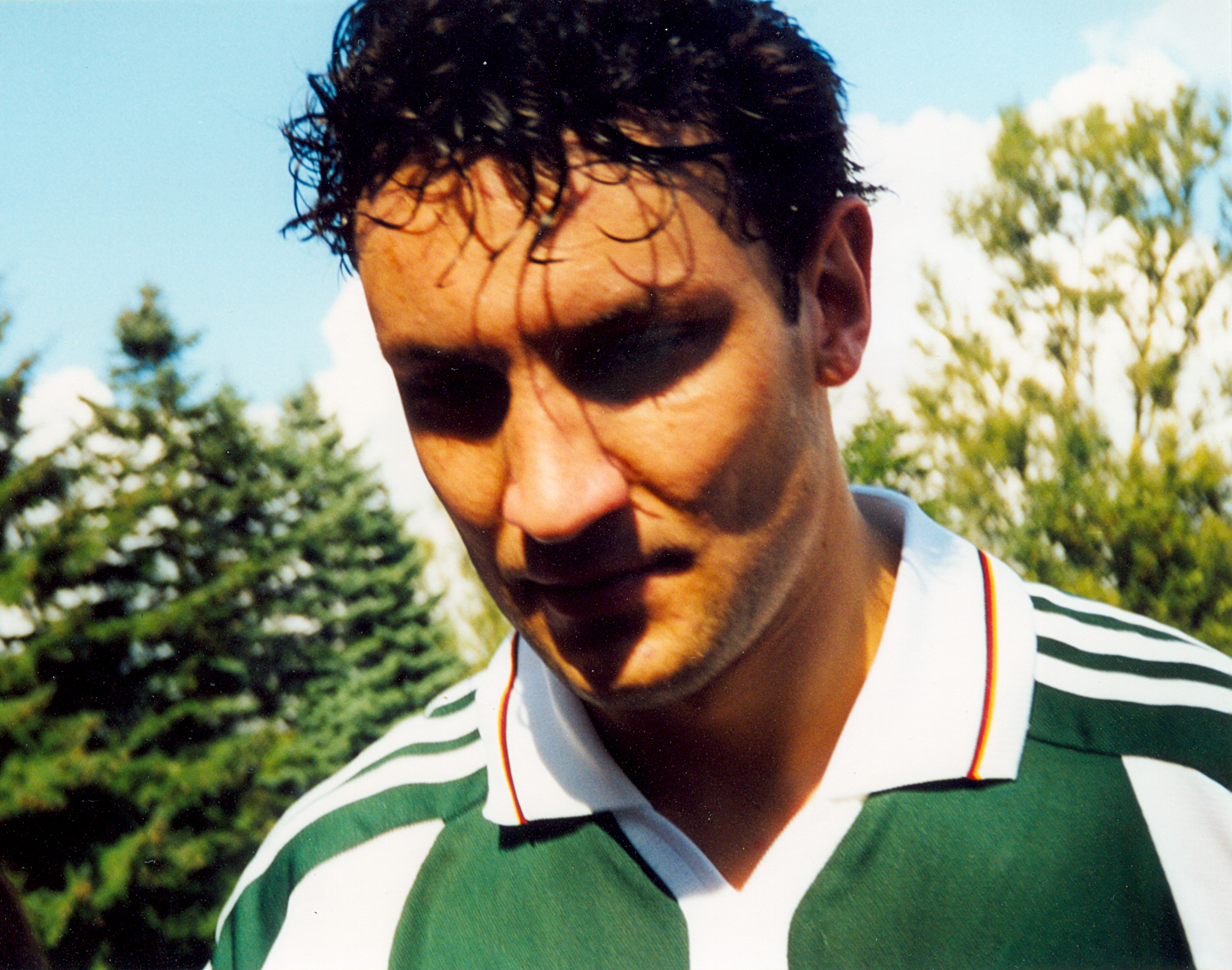
- Hertzsch in 2000

Personal information
- Date of birth: 22 July 1977 (age 49)
- Place of birth: Meerane, East Germany
- Height: 1.84 m (6 ft 0 in)
- Position: Defender

Youth career
- 1982–1988: BSG Stahl Callenberg
- 1988–1990: BSG Motor Hohenstein-Ernstthal
- 1990–1996: Chemnitzer FC

Senior career*
Years	Team	Apps	(Gls)
1996–1997	Chemnitzer FC	50	(0)
1997–2003	Hamburger SV	151	(1)
2003–2004	Bayer Leverkusen	3	(0)
2004	Eintracht Frankfurt	15	(1)
2004–2006	1. FC Kaiserslautern	58	(0)
2006–2009	FC Augsburg	70	(1)
2009–2011	RB Leipzig	50	(2)
2011–2013	RB Leipzig II		

International career
1997–1999	Germany U-21	13	(1)
2000–2002	Germany	2	(0)
- * Club domestic league appearances and goals

Ingo Hertzsch (born 22 July 1977) is a German former professional footballer who played as a defender.

== Club career ==
Hertzsch was born in Meerane. He appeared in more than 225 Bundesliga matches.

== International career ==
Hertzsch played for the Germany national team in a friendly match against Denmark in November 2000 and in a friendly against Bulgaria in August 2002.
