= Carsten Ramelow =

German footballer (born 1974)

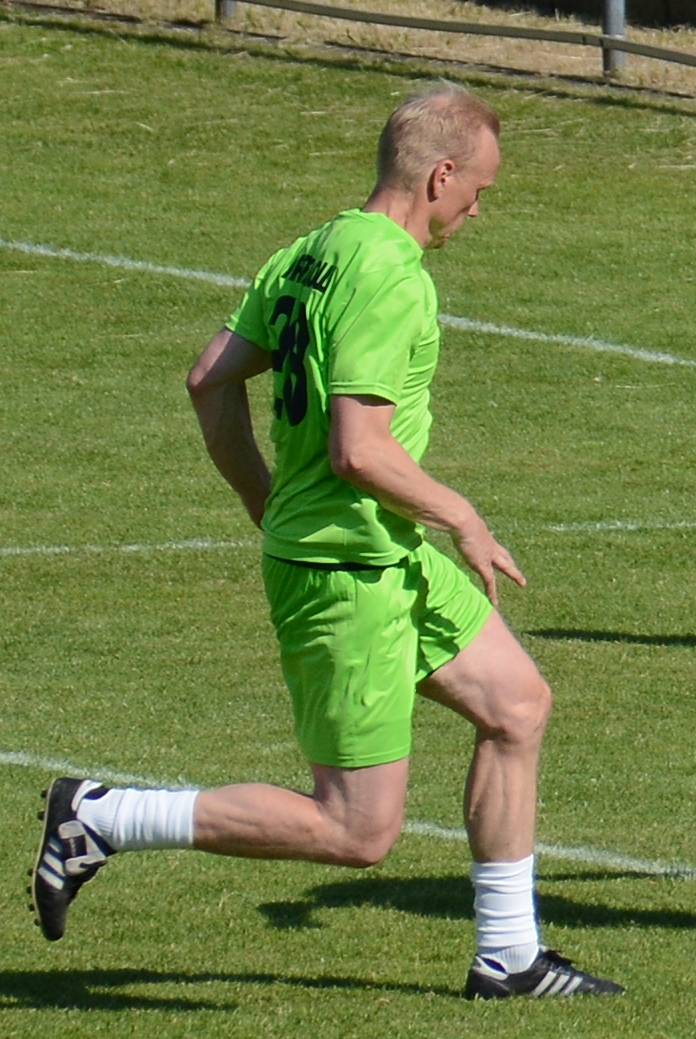
- Ramelow in 2014

Personal information
- Date of birth: 20 March 1974 (age 52)
- Place of birth: West Berlin, West Germany
- Height: 1.86 m (6 ft 1 in)
- Positions: Centre-back; defensive midfielder

Youth career
- 1980–1987: Tasmania Berlin
- 1987–1988: Tennis Borussia Berlin
- 1988–1989: Hertha Zehlendorf
- 1989–1991: SC Siemensstadt

Senior career*
Years	Team	Apps	(Gls)
1991–1995	Hertha BSC	80	(5)
1995–2008	Bayer Leverkusen	333	(23)
Total		413	(28)

International career
1993–1996	Germany U21	18	(2)
1998–2004	Germany	46	(3)
Medal record
Men's Football
Representing Germany
FIFA World Cup
Runner-up	2002 Korea/Japan
- * Club domestic league appearances and goals

Carsten Ramelow (German pronunciation: [ˈkaʁstn̩ ˈʁaməlo]; born 20 March 1974) is a German former professional footballer who played as either a central defender or a defensive midfielder.

Known for his tough tackling and defensive positioning, he played professionally for Hertha BSC and Bayer Leverkusen, for 17 years. The recipient of nearly 50 caps with Germany, he represented the nation at one World Cup and one European Championship.

== Club career ==
Born in Berlin, Ramelow grew as a player at local Hertha BSC, playing five second division matches in his first two years combined, and five seasons in total: his debut came on 25 April 1992 (aged 18), in a 0–5 home loss against Bayer Uerdingen. In the 1992–93 season, he helped the reserve squad reach the domestic cup final, where they lost to Bayer Leverkusen.

In January 1996, Ramelow moved to the Bundesliga with Bayer Leverkusen, being a major part of the squads that never finished lower than fourth until the 2003–04 season (except for 2002–03, where they would rank only 15th, the last place before the relegation zone); a defensive-minded player, he scored twice in his top flight debut, a 2–0 home win against Hansa Rostock on 19 March, and contributed with 16 matches (15 complete) in Bayer's 2001–02 UEFA Champions League runner-up run, including the final loss against Real Madrid.

On 3 November 2004, Ramelow was involved in an incident with Roma's Francesco Totti, during a 1–1 draw at the Stadio Olimpico in Rome in the Champions League: the Italian Totti jumped on a sliding Ramelow, stomping on his shoulder and back, and receiving a yellow card. From 2006 to 2008, he appeared rarely due to injuries, and announced his retirement from football in March, at the age of 34.

== International career ==
Ramelow first appeared for the Germany national team on 10 October 1998, in a 1–0 loss in Turkey for the UEFA Euro 2000 qualifiers. He went on to win 46 caps, and was summoned for the squads at that tournament (not leaving the bench in an eventual group stage exit) and the 2002 FIFA World Cup (appearing five times for the losing finalists, and receiving a red card in the 2–0 group stage win against Cameroon).

Ramelow was poised to be selected by manager Rudi Völler for Euro 2004 in Portugal, but announced his international retirement one week before the squad was picked.

== Career statistics ==
=== Club ===
Appearances and goals by club, season and competition
Club	Season	League			DFB-Pokal		DFB-Ligapokal		Europe		Total	
Club	Season	Division	Apps	Goals	Apps	Goals	Apps	Goals	Apps	Goals	Apps	Goals
Hertha BSC	1991–92	2. Bundesliga	2	0	–		–		–		2	0
Hertha BSC	1992–93	2. Bundesliga	3	1	2	1	–		–		5	2
Hertha BSC	1993–94	2. Bundesliga	27	2	1	0	–		–		28	2
Hertha BSC	1994–95	2. Bundesliga	31	2	1	0	–		–		32	2
Hertha BSC	1995–96	2. Bundesliga	17	0	1	2	–		–		18	2
Hertha BSC	Total		80	5	5	3	–		–		85	8
Bayer Leverkusen	1995–96	Bundesliga	15	2	1	0	–		–		16	2
Bayer Leverkusen	1996–97	Bundesliga	32	2	1	0	–		–		33	2
Bayer Leverkusen	1997–98	Bundesliga	33	2	4	0	1	0	9	1	47	3
Bayer Leverkusen	1998–99	Bundesliga	27	4	1	0	–		4	0	32	4
Bayer Leverkusen	1999–00	Bundesliga	26	0	1	0	2	0	8	0	37	0
Bayer Leverkusen	2000–01	Bundesliga	32	2	3	1	–		7	2	42	5
Bayer Leverkusen	2001–02	Bundesliga	32	2	6	0	1	0	16	1	55	3
Bayer Leverkusen	2002–03	Bundesliga	32	1	5	2	–		9	0	46	3
Bayer Leverkusen	2003–04	Bundesliga	31	2	–		–		–		31	2
Bayer Leverkusen	2004–05	Bundesliga	31	1	1	0	1	0	10	0	43	1
Bayer Leverkusen	2005–06	Bundesliga	25	2	1	0	1	0	2	0	29	2
Bayer Leverkusen	2006–07	Bundesliga	13	2	1	0	1	0	6	2	21	4
Bayer Leverkusen	2007–08	Bundesliga	4	1	–		–		1	0	5	1
Bayer Leverkusen	Total		333	23	25	3	7	0	72	6	437	32
Career total			413	28	30	6	7	0	72	6	522	40

=== International ===
Appearances and goals by national team and year
National team	Year	Apps	Goals
Germany	1998	3	0
Germany	1999	3	0
Germany	2000	7	0
Germany	2001	9	0
Germany	2002	12	0
Germany	2003	10	2
Germany	2004	2	1
Total		46	7

Scores and results list Germany's goal tally first, score column indicates score after each Ramelow goal.

List of international goals scored by Carsten Ramelow
No.	Date	Venue	Opponent	Score	Result	Competition	Ref.
1	29 March 2003	Frankenstadion, Nuremberg, Germany	Lithuania	1–0	1–1	UEFA Euro 2004 qualifying	
2	1 June 2003	Volkswagen Arena, Wolfsburg, Germany	Canada	1–1	4–1	Friendly	
3	18 February 2004	Stadion Poljud, Split, Croatia	Croatia	2–1	2–1	Friendly	

== Honours ==
Bayer Leverkusen

- Bundesliga runner-up: 1996–97, 1998–99, 1999–2000, 2001–02
- UEFA Champions League runner-up: 2001–02
- DFB-Pokal: runner-up: 2001–02

Germany

- FIFA World Cup runner-up: 2002

Individual

- kicker Bundesliga Team of the Season: 1998–99

== Musical career ==
In 2005, Ramelow published one music album, Sing when you're winning. It was not distributed commercially, only being made available to his family and friends.
