= 1998–99 Bundesliga =

36th season of the Bundesliga

Bundesliga
- Season: 1998–99
- Dates: 14 August 1998 – 29 May 1999
- Champions: Bayern Munich; 14th Bundesliga title 15th German title
- Relegated: 1. FC Nürnberg; VfL Bochum; Borussia Mönchengladbach
- Champions League: Bayern Munich; Bayer Leverkusen; Hertha BSC; Borussia Dortmund
- UEFA Cup: 1. FC Kaiserslautern; VfL Wolfsburg; Werder Bremen (domestic cup winners)
- Intertoto Cup: Hamburger SV; MSV Duisburg
- Matches: 306
- Goals: 866 (2.83 per match)
- Top goalscorer: Michael Preetz (23)
- Biggest home win: Wolfsburg 7–1 M'gladbach (7 November 1998)
- Biggest away win: M'gladbach 2–8 Leverkusen (30 October 1998)
- Highest scoring: M'gladbach 2–8 Leverkusen (10 goals) (30 October 1998)

The 1998–99 Bundesliga was the 36th season of the Bundesliga, Germany's premier football league. It began on 14 August 1998 and ended on 29 May 1999. 1. FC Kaiserslautern were the defending champions.

== Competition modus ==
Every team played two games against each other team, one at home and one away. Teams received three points for a win and one point for a draw. If two or more teams were tied on points, places were determined by goal difference and, if still tied, by goals scored. The team with the most points were crowned champions while the three teams with the fewest points were relegated to 2. Bundesliga.

== Team changes to 1997–98 ==
Karlsruher SC, 1. FC Köln and Arminia Bielefeld were relegated to the 2. Bundesliga after finishing in the last three places. They were replaced by Eintracht Frankfurt, SC Freiburg and 1. FC Nürnberg.

== Season overview ==
While Bayern Munich clearly dominated the league and secured the championship in round 31, the season is well remembered for the struggle against relegation which remained close until the final whistle. In the last round (round 34), five teams needed a win to remain in the top flight, with one team having to join Mönchengladbach and Bochum who already had lost their chances. At halftime, Frankfurt looked like the relegated team, but they turned a 0–0 draw into a 5–1 win against Kaiserslautern. Rostock (3–2 at Bochum) and Stuttgart (1–0 against Bremen) also won their matches, and the other two teams, Nürnberg and Freiburg, faced each other. Nürnberg lost 1–2 and was eventually overtaken by the other four teams, dropping from position 12 to 16, and had to go down to 2. Bundesliga.

With around twenty minutes to go, league table position #16 changed hands several times:

- 68th minute: While Frankfurt had scored shortly after the break, Kaiserslautern equalized (1–1), therefore Frankfurt even more looked like the third relegated team.
- 70th to 74th minute: Frankfurt scored (2–1), which still would not have been enough, but Rostock (1–0 up) conceded two goals at Bochum and was now in 16th place.
- 77th to 82nd minute: Rostock equalized (2–2), but Frankfurt scored two more goals (4–1), leaving Rostock at #16 and now having the same goal difference as Nürnberg.
- 83rd minute: Rostock scored another goal (3–2), which meant that Nürnberg (still 0–2 down) dropped to 16th place and would have been relegated.
- 85th minute: Nürnberg scored (1–2) and climbed back up the table, leaving Frankfurt in the relegation zone again.
- 89th minute: With the penultimate goal of the season (the final one being scored for Schalke at Munich), Frankfurt scored for the final time during the match which resulted in a 5–1 win over Kaiserslautern. Soon afterwards the games in Nürnberg (1–2), Frankfurt and Bochum (a 3–2 win for Rostock) ended, and Nürnberg were relegated.

In a famous post-match interview, Frankfurt's striker Jan Åge Fjørtoft, who had scored the team's decisive goal, praised Frankfurt's manager Jörg Berger claiming that he would have also saved RMS Titanic.

== Team overview ==
Location of teams in Bundesliga 1998–99

Club	Location	Ground	Capacity
Hertha BSC	Berlin	Olympiastadion	76,000
VfL Bochum	Bochum	Ruhrstadion	36,344
SV Werder Bremen	Bremen	Weserstadion	36,000
Borussia Dortmund	Dortmund	Westfalenstadion	68,600
MSV Duisburg	Duisburg	Wedaustadion	30,128
Eintracht Frankfurt	Frankfurt am Main	Waldstadion	62,000
SC Freiburg	Freiburg	Dreisamstadion	22,500
Hamburger SV	Hamburg	Volksparkstadion	62,000
1. FC Kaiserslautern	Kaiserslautern	Fritz-Walter-Stadion	38,500
Bayer 04 Leverkusen	Leverkusen	BayArena	22,500
Borussia Mönchengladbach	Mönchengladbach	Bökelbergstadion	34,500
TSV 1860 Munich	Munich	Olympiastadion	63,000
FC Bayern Munich	Munich	Olympiastadion	63,000
1. FC Nürnberg	Nuremberg	Frankenstadion	44,700
FC Hansa Rostock	Rostock	Ostseestadion	25,850
FC Schalke 04	Gelsenkirchen	Parkstadion	70,000
VfB Stuttgart	Stuttgart	Gottlieb-Daimler-Stadion	53,700
VfL Wolfsburg	Wolfsburg	VfL-Stadion am Elsterweg	21,600

== League table ==
Pos	Team	Pld	W	D	L	GF	GA	GD	Pts	Qualification or relegation
1	Bayern Munich (C)	34	24	6	4	76	28	+48	78	Qualification to Champions League group stage
2	Bayer Leverkusen	34	17	12	5	61	30	+31	63	Qualification to Champions League group stage
3	Hertha BSC	34	18	8	8	59	32	+27	62	Qualification to Champions League third qualifying round
4	Borussia Dortmund	34	16	9	9	48	34	+14	57	Qualification to Champions League third qualifying round
5	1. FC Kaiserslautern	34	17	6	11	51	47	+4	57	Qualification to UEFA Cup first round
6	VfL Wolfsburg	34	15	10	9	54	49	+5	55	Qualification to UEFA Cup first round
7	Hamburger SV	34	13	11	10	47	46	+1	50	Qualification to Intertoto Cup third round
8	MSV Duisburg	34	13	10	11	48	45	+3	49	Qualification to Intertoto Cup second round
9	1860 Munich	34	11	8	15	49	56	−7	41	
10	Schalke 04	34	10	11	13	41	54	−13	41	
11	VfB Stuttgart	34	9	12	13	41	48	−7	39	
12	SC Freiburg	34	10	9	15	36	44	−8	39	
13	Werder Bremen	34	10	8	16	41	47	−6	38	Qualification to UEFA Cup first round (Note: Werder Bremen won the DFB-Pokal (domestic cup) and thus qualified for the UEFA Cup.)
14	Hansa Rostock	34	9	11	14	49	58	−9	38	
15	Eintracht Frankfurt	34	9	10	15	44	54	−10	37	
16	1. FC Nürnberg (R)	34	7	16	11	40	50	−10	37	Relegation to 2. Bundesliga
17	VfL Bochum (R)	34	7	8	19	40	65	−25	29	Relegation to 2. Bundesliga
18	Borussia Mönchengladbach (R)	34	4	9	21	41	79	−38	21	Relegation to 2. Bundesliga

Source: www.dfb.de
Rules for classification: 1) points; 2) goal difference; 3) number of goals scored.
(C) Champions; (R) Relegated

== Results ==
Home \ Away	BSC	BOC	SVW	BVB	DUI	SGE	SCF	HSV	FCK	B04	BMG	M60	FCB	FCN	ROS	S04	VFB	WOB
Hertha BSC	—	4–1	1–0	3–0	1–3	3–1	1–0	6–1	1–1	0–1	4–1	2–1	1–0	3–0	2–0	2–0	2–0	2–0
VfL Bochum	2–0	—	2–0	0–1	0–2	0–0	1–2	2–0	1–2	1–5	2–1	2–0	2–2	0–3	2–3	1–2	3–3	0–2
Werder Bremen	2–1	1–1	—	1–1	1–1	1–2	2–3	0–0	0–1	2–2	4–1	4–1	0–1	2–3	0–3	1–0	2–2	0–1
Borussia Dortmund	3–0	0–1	2–1	—	2–0	3–1	2–1	2–1	1–0	1–0	1–1	3–1	2–2	3–0	2–0	3–0	3–0	2–1
MSV Duisburg	0–0	2–0	2–0	3–2	—	2–1	1–0	2–3	3–1	0–0	2–2	1–1	0–3	1–1	4–1	1–2	2–0	6–1
Eintracht Frankfurt	1–1	1–0	0–2	2–0	0–0	—	3–1	2–2	5–1	2–3	0–0	2–3	1–0	3–2	2–2	1–2	1–1	0–1
SC Freiburg	0–2	1–1	0–2	2–2	2–2	2–0	—	0–0	0–1	1–1	2–1	1–2	0–2	1–0	3–0	0–2	2–0	0–0
Hamburger SV	0–4	1–0	1–1	0–0	4–1	0–1	2–1	—	2–0	0–0	3–0	3–0	0–2	2–0	1–0	2–2	3–1	1–1
1. FC Kaiserslautern	4–3	2–3	4–0	1–0	3–0	2–1	0–2	1–0	—	0–1	2–1	1–1	2–1	2–0	3–2	4–1	1–1	1–1
Bayer Leverkusen	2–2	2–0	2–0	3–1	2–0	2–1	1–1	1–2	2–2	—	4–1	1–1	1–2	3–0	3–1	1–1	0–0	3–0
Borussia Mönchengladbach	2–4	2–2	0–1	0–2	0–2	1–1	3–1	2–2	0–2	2–8	—	2–0	0–2	0–2	1–1	3–0	2–3	5–2
1860 Munich	2–0	2–1	1–3	2–0	0–0	4–1	2–0	0–0	1–2	0–2	3–1	—	1–1	1–2	2–1	4–5	1–1	2–3
Bayern Munich	1–1	4–2	1–0	2–2	3–1	3–1	2–0	5–3	4–0	2–0	4–2	3–1	—	2–0	6–1	1–1	2–0	3–0
1. FC Nürnberg	0–0	2–2	1–1	0–0	0–2	2–2	1–2	1–1	1–1	2–2	2–0	1–5	2–0	—	2–2	3–0	2–2	1–1
Hansa Rostock	1–2	3–0	2–1	2–0	3–0	2–2	0–2	0–1	2–1	1–1	1–1	4–1	0–4	1–1	—	2–2	3–0	3–3
Schalke 04	0–0	2–2	1–2	1–1	2–0	2–3	1–1	1–4	0–2	0–1	1–0	2–2	1–3	2–2	1–0	—	1–0	2–0
VfB Stuttgart	0–0	4–2	1–0	2–1	0–0	2–0	3–1	3–1	4–0	0–1	2–2	0–1	0–2	0–0	1–1	2–1	—	1–2
VfL Wolfsburg	2–1	4–1	2–4	0–0	4–2	2–0	1–1	4–1	2–1	1–0	7–1	1–0	0–1	1–1	1–1	0–0	3–2	—

Source: DFB
Legend: Blue = home team win; Yellow = draw; Red = away team win.

== Top goalscorers ==
Rank	Player	Club	Goals
1	(Germany) Michael Preetz	Hertha BSC	23
2	(Germany) Ulf Kirsten	Bayer 04 Leverkusen	19
3	(Germany) Oliver Neuville	Hansa Rostock	14
3	(Ghana) Tony Yeboah	Hamburger SV	14
5	(Germany) Markus Beierle	MSV Duisburg	13
5	(North Macedonia) Saša Ćirić	Nürnberg	13
5	(Brazil) Giovane Élber	Bayern	13
5	(Germany) Carsten Jancker	Bayern	13
5	(Poland) Andrzej Juskowiak	VfL Wolfsburg	13
10	(Germany) Bernd Hobsch	TSV 1860 Munich	12
10	(Germany) Olaf Marschall	Kaiserslautern	12

== Attendances ==
No.	Team	Attendance	Change	Highest
1	Borussia Dortmund	65,494	20.8%	69,000
2	Bayern München	56,235	3.1%	69,000
3	Hertha BSC	52,461	-0.8%	76,000
4	Schalke 04	43,555	-13.4%	62,109
5	1. FC Kaiserslautern	41,058	8.0%	41,500
6	1. FC Nürnberg	36,100	45.8%	44,500
7	TSV 1860	32,476	-3.4%	69,000
8	Eintracht Frankfurt	31,944	35.4%	58,300
9	VfB Stuttgart	30,765	-22.3%	53,000
10	Werder Bremen	29,786	-1.4%	36,000
11	Borussia Mönchengladbach	26,082	-4.9%	34,500
12	Hamburger SV	24,361	-26.4%	29,052
13	VfL Bochum	23,734	-11.1%	33,063
14	Bayer Leverkusen	22,447	0.9%	22,500
15	SC Freiburg	22,412	20.7%	22,500
16	MSV Duisburg	17,318	4.2%	29,000
17	VfL Wolfsburg	16,714	-1.8%	21,600
18	Hansa Rostock	15,953	-15.3%	24,500

== See also ==
- 1998–99 2. Bundesliga
- 1998–99 DFB-Pokal
