= 2009–10 Eintracht Frankfurt season =

Eintracht Frankfurt
2009–10 season
- Chairman: Heribert Bruchhagen
- Manager: Michael Skibbe
- Bundesliga: 10th
- DFB-Pokal: Third round
- Top goalscorer: League: Alexander Meier (10); All: Alexander Meier (12)
- Highest home attendance: 51,500 (vs Hamburger SV (league), 20 September 2009)
- Lowest home attendance: 25,450 (vs Alemannia Aachen (cup), 23 September 2009)
- Average home league attendance: 47,206 (league)
| Home colours | Away colours | Third colours |

The 2009–10 season was Eintracht Frankfurt's 110th season and their fifth consecutive season in the Bundesliga.

== Players ==
=== First-team squad ===
Squad at end of season

Note: Flags indicate national team as defined under FIFA eligibility rules; some limited exceptions apply. Players may hold more than one non-FIFA nationality.

| No. | Pos. | Nation | Player |
|---|---|---|---|
| 1 | GK | MKD | Oka Nikolov (Note: Nikolov was born in Erbach im Odenwald, West Germany, but also qualified to represent Macedonia (now North Macedonia) internationally and made his international debut for Macedonia in September 1998.) |
| 2 | DF | GER | Patrick Ochs |
| 3 | DF | SRB | Nikola Petković |
| 4 | DF | GER | Maik Franz |
| 5 | DF | MKD | Aleksandar Vasoski |
| 6 | MF | GER | Selim Teber |
| 7 | MF | GER | Benjamin Köhler |
| 8 | MF | BIH | Zlatan Bajramović (Note: Bajramović was born in Hamburg, West Germany, but also qualified to represent Bosnia and Herzegovina internationally through his parents and made his international debut for Bosnia and Herzegovina in 2002.) |
| 10 | FW | GRE | Nikos Liberopoulos |
| 11 | MF | AUT | Ümit Korkmaz |
| 13 | MF | USA | Ricardo Clark |
| 14 | MF | GER | Alexander Meier |
| 16 | DF | SUI | Christoph Spycher |
| 17 | FW | CZE | Martin Fenin |
| 18 | FW | GRE | Ioannis Amanatidis |
| 19 | MF | TUR | Halil Altıntop (Note: Altıntop was born in Gelsenkirchen, West Germany (now Germany), but also qualified to represent Turkey internationally and represented Turkey at U-18, U-20, U-21 and B level before making his international debut for Turkey in 2005.) |
| 21 | GK | GER | Markus Pröll |
| 22 | GK | GER | Ralf Fährmann |

| No. | Pos. | Nation | Player |
|---|---|---|---|
| 23 | DF | GER | Marco Russ |
| 24 | DF | GER | Sebastian Jung |
| 25 | MF | GER | Marcel Heller |
| 26 | FW | GER | Juvhel Tsoumou (Note: Tsoumou was born in Brazzaville, the Congo, but was raised in Germany from the age of 10 and represented Germany at U-18 and U-19 level before making his international debut for the Congo in September 2017.) |
| 27 | MF | SUI | Pirmin Schwegler |
| 28 | GK | GER | Jan Zimmermann |
| 29 | DF | BRA | Chris |
| 30 | MF | BRA | Caio |
| 31 | DF | GER | Stefano Cincotta (Note: Cincotta was born in Guatemala City, Guatemala, but was raised in Germany and also qualified to represent Italy internationally through his father, and represented Germany at U-17, U-19 and U-20 level before making his international debut for Guatemala in 2015.) |
| 32 | MF | GER | Faton Toski (Note: Toski was born in Gjilan, SFR Yugoslavia (now Kosovo), but was raised in Germany and represented Germany at U-19 level before making his international debut for Kosovo in March 2014.) |
| 33 | DF | GER | Jürgen Mössmer |
| 34 | FW | GER | Cenk Tosun (Note: Tosun was born in Wetzlar, Germany, and represented Germany at U-16, U-18, U-19 and U-21 level, but also qualified to represent Turkey internationally and represented Turkey at U-21 and B level before making his international debut for Turkey in October 2013.) |
| 35 | FW | GER | Marcos Álvarez |
| 36 | MF | GER | Marcel Titsch-Rivero |
| 37 | DF | GER | Timothy Chandler (Note: Chandler was born in Frankfurt, West Germany (now Germany), but also qualified to represent the United States internationally through his father and made his international debut for the United States in March 2011.) |
| 38 | GK | GER | Andreas Rössl |
| 40 | DF | GER | Stefan Haben |
| 41 | GK | GER | Erman Muratagic |

=== Left club during season ===
Note: Flags indicate national team as defined under FIFA eligibility rules; some limited exceptions apply. Players may hold more than one non-FIFA nationality.

| No. | Pos. | Nation | Player |
|---|---|---|---|
| 13 | DF | GER | Markus Steinhöfer |
| 15 | DF | IRI | Mehdi Mahdavikia |

| No. | Pos. | Nation | Player |
|---|---|---|---|
| 19 | DF | ALG | Habib Bellaïd (Note: Bellaïd was born in Bobigny, France, and represented France at U-16, U-17, U-18, U-19 and U-21 level, but also qualified to represent Algeria and Tunisia internationally through his mother and father respectively and made his international debut for Algeria in May 2010.) |
| 20 | DF | GER | Christoph Preuß |

== Transfers ==
=== Summer transfers in ===
- Marcos Álvarez from the Eintracht Frankfurt Academy
- Ralf Fährmann from Schalke 04
- Maik Franz from Karlsruher SC
- Marcel Heller was loaned to MSV Duisburg
- Sebastian Jung from the Eintracht Frankfurt Academy
- Pirmin Schwegler from Bayer Leverkusen
- Selim Teber from 1899 Hoffenheim
- Marcel Titsch-Rivero from Eintracht Frankfurt U23 (reserves)
- Cenk Tosun from the Eintracht Frankfurt academy

=== Summer transfers out ===
- Habib Bellaïd to Strasbourg (on loan until January 2010)
- Michael Fink to Beşiktaş
- Junichi Inamoto to Rennes
- Alexander Krük on loan at VfL Osnabrück
- Léonard Kweuke to Energie Cottbus, was loaned from Dunajská Streda
- Krešo Ljubičić to Hajduk Split

=== Winter transfers in ===
- Halil Altıntop from Schalke 04
- Ricardo Clark from Houston Dynamo

=== Winter transfers out ===
- Habib Bellaïd to Boulogne (on loan until June 2010)
- Mehdi Mahdavikia to Steel Azin
- Christoph Preuß retired due to injury reasons
- Markus Steinhöfer to 1. FC Kaiserslautern (on loan until June 2010)

== Results ==
=== Friendlies ===
| 4 July 2009 Friendly | WSG Wattens | 2–1 | Eintracht Frankfurt | Parkstadion, Zell am Ziller |
| 17:00 CET | Hobel 46', 75' | Report | Teber 40' | Attendance: 900 |

| 7 July 2009 Friendly | Eintracht Frankfurt | 1–2 | Dynamo Kyiv | ?, Jenbach |
| 16:00 CET | Chris 90' (pen.) | Report | Guilherme 28', 35' | Attendance: 750 |

| 10 July 2009 Friendly | Eintracht Frankfurt | 2–0 | Teplice | Stadion auf dem Stephanshügel, Limburg |
| 18:00 CET | Klein 39' (o.g.); Rosa 90' (o.g.) | Report | | Attendance: 1,950 |

| 12 July 2009 Friendly | TSV Eintracht Stadtallendorf | 2–3 | Eintracht Frankfurt | Herrenwaldstadion, Stadtallendorf |
| 17:00 CET | Eidelwein 53'; Atas 68'; Yildiran (yellow card) 85' (red card) | Report | Jung 6'; Steinhöfer 35'; Tosun 90' | Attendance: 5,000 |

| 15 July 2009 Friendly | Osijek | 3–0 | Eintracht Frankfurt | Drei-Lärchen-Stadion, Bad Bleiberg |
| 15:00 CET | Nikšić 10', 55'; Barišić 81' | Report | | Attendance: 300 |

| 18 July 2009 Friendly | Eintracht Frankfurt | 0–3 | Politehnica Timișoara | TBA, Feffernitz |
| 18:30 CET | | Report | Luchin 33'; Parks 68'; Magera 85' | Attendance: 500 |

| 20 July 2009 Friendly | Austria Kärnten | 0–5 | Eintracht Frankfurt | Sportplatz Hermagor, Hermagor |
| 18:30 CET | | Report | Meier 12', 27', 42'; Teber 16'; Amanatidis 68' | Attendance: 1,000 |

| 25 July 2009 Friendly | 1. FC Kaiserslautern | 0–2 | Eintracht Frankfurt | Fritz Walter Stadion, Kaiserslautern |
| 17:00 CET | | Report | Ochs 39'; Meier 67' | Attendance: 5,448 |

| 28 July 2009 Friendly | 1. FC 09 Oberstedten | 0–19 | Eintracht Frankfurt | Sportanlage Tannenwald, Oberstedten |
| 18:30 CET | | Report | Köhler 3', 43', 45'; Caio 8', 35', 37'; Meier 20'; Amanatidis 25'; Ochs 45'; Fenin 53'; Korkmaz 55', 63'; Liberopoulos 62', 67', 69', 82', 89'; Jung 77'; Steinhöfer 87' | Attendance: 3,400 |

| 5 August 2009 Friendly | Burghaun XI | 0–13 | Eintracht Frankfurt | Sportfeld Haunetal, Burghaun |
| 18:30 CET | | Report | Fenin 6', 15', 45'; Korkmaz 11'; Toski 13'; Liberopoulos 24', 25', 56', 60', 61'; Korkmaz 40'; Heller 54'; Alvarez 90' | Attendance: 3,300 |

| 11 August 2009 Friendly | Kickers-Viktoria Mühlheim | 0–10 | Eintracht Frankfurt | Stadion an der Anton-Dey-Straße, Mühlheim |
| 18:00 CET | | Report | Heller 19'; Jung 23'; Steinhöfer 35'; Korkmaz 37'; Köhler 42'; Tosun 74'; Tsoumou 76', 88'; Álvarez 83'; Bellaïd 85' | Attendance: 1,800 |

| 18 August 2009 Friendly | Melsunger FV | 0–7 | Eintracht Frankfurt | Freundschaftsinsel, Melsungen |
| 18:30 CET | | Report | Fenin 12', 31', 67'; Toski 24'; Steinhöfer 70'; Fachat 88'; Tsoumou 88' | Attendance: 2,200 |

| 25 August 2009 Friendly | Gießen XI | 1–13 | Eintracht Frankfurt | Waldstadion, Gießen |
| 18:30 CET | Frenz 70' | Report | Heller 14', 16', 18', 43', 51'; Korkmaz 30', 56'; Priebe 43' (o.g.); Lauber 58' (o.g.); Alvarez 64', 68', 87'; Steinhöfer 87' | Attendance: 3,500 |

| 1 September 2009 Friendly | SV 09 Hofheim | 0–20 | Eintracht Frankfurt | Sportpark Heide, Hofheim |
| 18:30 CET | | Report | Köhler 6', 38'; Steinhöfer 15', 25', 76', 77'; Korkmaz 18', 48', 66'; Meier 21', 30', 36'; Caio 26'; Heller 50', 53', 64'; Tsoumou 55'; Ochs 68'; Titsch-Rivero 71', 81' | Attendance: 1,500 |

| 4 September 2009 Friendly | SKV Mörfelden | 2–10 | Eintracht Frankfurt | Waldstadion an der Rüsselsheimer Straße, Mörfelden-Walldorf |
| 18:30 CET | Jantz 53'; Varela 60' | Report | Teber 20', 31'; Ochs 30'; Meier 42', 61'; Caio 50'; Franz 77'; Tsoumou 81', 88'; Titsch-Rivero 89' | Attendance: 1,800 |

| 8 September 2009 Friendly | SG Bruchköbel | 2–11 | Eintracht Frankfurt | Sportplatz am Wald, Bruchköbel |
| 18:30 CET | Müller 37'; Rozic 72' | Report | Russ 20', 69'; Teber 27'; Caio 31', 85'; Korkmaz 40', 79'; Heller 48'; Tsoumou 82', 84'; Toski 90' | Attendance: 2,000 |

| 6 October 2009 Friendly | Eintracht Wetzlar | 1–3 | Eintracht Frankfurt | Stadion Wetzlar, Wetzlar |
| 17:00 CET | Schäfer 68' | Report | Teber 44'; Liberopoulos 84', 89' | Attendance: 2,000 |

| 8 October 2009 Friendly | Xanthi | 2–4 | Eintracht Frankfurt | Skoda Xanthi Arena, Xanthi |
| 18:00 CET | Fabianesi 46' (pen.); Perreira 50' | Report | Meier 64'; Liberopoulos 68'; Fenin 74'; Köhler 80' | Attendance: 3,500 |

| 14 October 2009 Friendly | FV Eschersheim | 0–15 | Eintracht Frankfurt | Sportplatz Eschersheim, Frankfurt |
| 14:30 CET | Waske 42' | Report | Korkmaz 8', 9', 76'; Steinhöfer 12', 43', 81'; Titsch-Rivero 24', 51'; Liberopoulos 27', 38'; Caio 40', 69'; Köhler 61'; Heller 86'; Franz 89' | Attendance: 1,300 |

| 8 January 2010 Friendly | Rot-Weiß Oberhausen | 1–5 | Eintracht Frankfurt | Training pitch Hotel Selin, Side-Colakli, Turkey |
| 14:00 CET | Terranova 38' | Report | Liberopoulos 14', 21'; Tsoumou 38'; Meier 71'; Primorac (trialist) 85' | Attendance: 100 |

| 9 January 2010 Friendly | Karlsruher SC | 3–0 | Eintracht Frankfurt | Training pitch Hotel Sueno, Belek, Turkey |
| 14:00 CET | Akın 70'; Cuntz 84'; Chrisantus 86' | Report | | Attendance: 250 |

| 27 April 2010 Friendly | 1. FC Haßfurt | 0–6 | Eintracht Frankfurt | Beständig-Stadion, Haßfurt |
| 18:30 CET | | Report | Amanatidis 30'; Clark 35'; Stark 40'; Tosun 47'; Alvarez 55'; Hess 88' | Attendance: 1,400 |

| 4 May 2010 Friendly | Viktoria Sindlingen | 1–7 | Eintracht Frankfurt | Sportplatz am Kreisel, Frankfurt, Sindlingen |
| 18:30 CET | Gulzar 44' | Report | Fenin 2', 12'; Heller 14'; Altıntop 30'; Tsoumou 65'; Franz 73' (pen.); Boller 74' | Attendance: 1,800 |

| 12 May 2010 Friendly | Vietnam | 0–2 | Eintracht Frankfurt | Mỹ Đình National Stadium, Hanoi, Vietnam |
| 19:00 ICT; 13:00 CET | | Report | Meier 71'; Altıntop 72' | Attendance: 10,000 |

| 14 May 2010 Friendly | Đồng Tâm Long An | 1–3 | Eintracht Frankfurt | Thong Nhat Stadium, Ho Chi Minh City, Vietnam |
| 18:30 ICT; 12:30 CET | Lam Wa 30' | Report | Altıntop 66'; Köhler 69'; Tsoumou 84' | Attendance: 10,000 |

==== Indoor tournaments ====
| 2 January 2010 Indoor soccer (Harder 13 Cup) | Eintracht Frankfurt | 3–3 | MSV Duisburg | SAP Arena, Mannheim |
| 17:45 CET | Heller 3'; Caio 9' (pen.); Köhler 19' | Report | Ben-Hatira 5', 14'; Sahan 17' | Attendance: 11,497 |

| 2 January 2010 Indoor soccer (Harder 13 Cup) | Karlsruher SC | 6–5 | Eintracht Frankfurt | SAP Arena, Mannheim |
| 19:33 CET | Staffeldt x3 Konrad; Akın; Zimmermann | Report | Caio x2 Alvarez; Köhler; Toski | Attendance: 11,497 |

| 3 January 2010 Indoor soccer (Hessen Cup) | Eintracht Frankfurt | 1–4 | Kickers Offenbach | Ballsporthalle, Frankfurt |
| 16:39 CET | Titsch-Rivero 18' | Report | Mešić 13'; Baier 15'; Ulm 18'; Mešić 20' | Attendance: 5,000 |

| 3 January 2010 Indoor soccer (Hessen Cup) | Eintracht Frankfurt | 1–2 | Arminia Bielefeld | Ballsporthalle, Frankfurt |
| 17:30 CET | Rüter 12' (o.g.) | Report | Rodenberg 4'; Feick 7' | Attendance: 5,000 |

=== Bundesliga ===
| 8 August 2009 1 | Werder Bremen | 2–3 | Eintracht Frankfurt | Weserstadion, Bremen |
| 15:30 CET | Özil 13' (pen.); Sanogo 44'; Prödl (red card) 90' | Report | Amanatidis 6', 42'; Fenin 71' | Attendance: 33,000 |

| 15 August 2009 2 | Eintracht Frankfurt | 1–1 | 1. FC Nürnberg | Commerzbank-Arena, Frankfurt |
| 15:30 CET | Caio 17' | Report | Bunjaku 64' | Attendance: 49,000 |

| 22 August 2009 3 | 1. FC Köln | 0–0 | Eintracht Frankfurt | RheinEnergieStadion, Cologne |
| 15:30 CET | | Report | Ochs (red card) 54' | Attendance: 49,200 |

| 29 August 2009 4 | Eintracht Frankfurt | 1–1 | Borussia Dortmund | Commerzbank-Arena, Frankfurt |
| 15:30 CET | Amanatidis 68' | Report | Zidan 62' | Attendance: 51,050 |

| 12 September 2009 5 | SC Freiburg | 0–2 | Eintracht Frankfurt | Dreisamstadion, Freiburg |
| 15:30 CET | | Report | Franz 67'; Meier 90' | Attendance: 23,600 |

| 20 September 2009 6 | Eintracht Frankfurt | 1–1 | Hamburger SV | Commerzbank-Arena, Frankfurt |
| 15:30 CET | Russ 32' | Report | Zé Roberto 7' | Attendance: 51,500 |

| 26 September 2009 7 | Eintracht Frankfurt | 0–3 | VfB Stuttgart | Commerzbank-Arena, Frankfurt |
| 15:30 CET | Russ (red card) 33' | Report | Schieber 17', 31'; Hitzlsperger 54' | Attendance: 49,750 |

| 2 October 2009 8 | Schalke 04 | 2–0 | Eintracht Frankfurt | Veltins-Arena, Gelsenkirchen |
| 20:30 CET | Asamoah 66'; Farfán 90+2' (pen.) | Report | Schwegler (yellow card) 18' (yellow-red card) 86' | Attendance: 61,673 |

| 17 October 2009 9 | Eintracht Frankfurt | 2–1 | Hannover 96 | Commerzbank-Arena, Frankfurt |
| 15:30 CET | Liberopoulos 24'; Meier 74' | Report | Štajner 68' | Attendance: 40,700 |

| 24 October 2009 10 | Bayern Munich | 2–1 | Eintracht Frankfurt | Allianz Arena, Munich |
| 15:30 CET | Robben 69'; Van Buyten 88' | Report | Meier 60' | Attendance: 69,000 |

| 1 November 2009 11 | Eintracht Frankfurt | 2–1 | VfL Bochum | Commerzbank-Arena, Frankfurt |
| 17:30 CET | Caio 14'; Franz 53' | Report | Franz 25' (o.g.); Ono (yellow card) 79' (yellow-red card) 80' | Attendance: 37,500 |

| 6 November 2009 12 | Bayer Leverkusen | 4–0 | Eintracht Frankfurt | BayArena, Leverkusen |
| 20:30 CET | Kießling 2'; Reinartz 6'; Kroos 11'; Bender 86' | Report | | Attendance: 30,210 |

| 21 November 2009 13 | Eintracht Frankfurt | 1–2 | Borussia Mönchengladbach | Commerzbank-Arena, Frankfurt |
| 15:30 CET | Schwegler 86' (pen.) | Report | Nikolov 55' (o.g.); Brouwers 66' | Attendance: 50,000 |

| 28 November 2009 14 | Hertha BSC | 1–3 | Eintracht Frankfurt | Olympic Stadium, Berlin |
| 15:30 CET | Ramos 81' | Report | Ochs 11'; Franz 70'; Meier 75' | Attendance: 48,253 |

| 5 December 2009 15 | Eintracht Frankfurt | 2–0 | Mainz 05 | Commerzbank-Arena, Frankfurt |
| 18:30 CET | Franz 29'; Meier 90+1' | Report | Amri (yellow card) 13' (yellow-red card) 86' | Attendance: 51,500 |

| 12 December 2009 16 | 1899 Hoffenheim | 1–1 | Eintracht Frankfurt | Rhein-Neckar-Arena, Sinsheim |
| 15:30 CET | Salihović 9' (pen.) | Report | Schwegler 61' | Attendance: 30,150 |

| 19 December 2009 17 | Eintracht Frankfurt | 2–2 | VfL Wolfsburg | Commerzbank-Arena, Frankfurt |
| 15:30 CET | Franz 26'; Meier 79' | Report | Džeko 37'; Josué 69' | Attendance: 41,700 |

| 16 January 2010 18 | Eintracht Frankfurt | 1–0 | Werder Bremen | Commerzbank-Arena, Frankfurt |
| 15:30 CET | Russ 57' | Report | | Attendance: 45,600 |

| 23 January 2010 19 | 1. FC Nürnberg | 1–1 | Eintracht Frankfurt | Frankenstadion, Nuremberg |
| 15:30 CET | Eigler 28' | Report | Köhler 40' | Attendance: 37,464 |

| 30 January 2010 20 | Eintracht Frankfurt | 1–2 | 1. FC Köln | Commerzbank-Arena, Frankfurt |
| 15:30 CET | Chris 76' | Report | Maniche 59'; Russ 84' (o.g.) | Attendance: 45,100 |

| 7 February 2010 21 | Borussia Dortmund | 2–3 | Eintracht Frankfurt | Signal Iduna Park, Dortmund |
| 17:30 CET | Hummels 17'; Barrios 57' | Report | Köhler 8'; Jung 65'; Meier 74' | Attendance: 70,400 |

| 14 February 2010 22 | Eintracht Frankfurt | 2–1 | SC Freiburg | Commerzbank-Arena, Frankfurt |
| 17:30 CET | Köhler 40'; Altıntop 90' | Report | Cissé 25' | Attendance: 34,900 |

| 20 February 2010 23 | Hamburger SV | 0–0 | Eintracht Frankfurt | HSH Nordbank Arena, Hamburg |
| 15:30 CET | | Report | | Attendance: 56,196 |

| 27 February 2010 24 | VfB Stuttgart | 2–1 | Eintracht Frankfurt | Mercedes-Benz Arena, Stuttgart |
| 15:30 CET | Cacau 41', 45' | Report | Köhler 39' | Attendance: 41,000 |

| 6 March 2010 25 | Eintracht Frankfurt | 1–4 | Schalke 04 | Commerzbank-Arena, Frankfurt |
| 15:30 CET | Meier 52' | Report | Matip 12'; Höwedes 15'; Rakitić 80'; Kurányi 89' | Attendance: 51,500 |

| 13 March 2010 26 | Hannover 96 | 2–1 | Eintracht Frankfurt | AWD-Arena, Hanover |
| 15:30 CET | Andreasen 14'; Pinto 57' | Report | Altıntop 45'; Teber (yellow card) 54' (yellow-red card); Franz (yellow card) 90' (yellow-red card) | Attendance: 38,000 |

| 20 March 2010 27 | Eintracht Frankfurt | 2–1 | Bayern Munich | Commerzbank-Arena, Frankfurt |
| 15:30 CET | Tsoumou 87'; Fenin 89' | Report | Altıntop 6' | Attendance: 51,500 |

| 26 March 2010 28 | VfL Bochum | 1–2 | Eintracht Frankfurt | Ruhrstadion, Bochum |
| 20:30 CET | Holtby 10' | Report | Russ 29'; Caio 64' | Attendance: 24,221 |

| 3 April 2010 29 | Eintracht Frankfurt | 3–2 | Bayer Leverkusen | Commerzbank-Arena, Frankfurt |
| 15:30 CET | Teber 28' (pen.); Caio; 62'; Franz 89' | Report | Kießling 33', 46'; Schwaab (red card) 49' | Attendance: 50,900 |

| 9 April 2010 30 | Borussia Mönchengladbach | 2–0 | Eintracht Frankfurt | Borussia-Park, Mönchengladbach |
| 20:30 CET | Reus 6'; Dante 10' | Report | | Attendance: 48,553 |

| 18 April 2010 31 | Eintracht Frankfurt | 2–2 | Hertha BSC | Commerzbank-Arena, Frankfurt |
| 17:30 CET | Korkmaz 37'; Russ 63' | Report | Kačar 17'; Raffael 42' | Attendance: 49,800 |

| 24 April 2010 32 | Mainz 05 | 3–3 | Eintracht Frankfurt | Stadion am Bruchweg, Mainz |
| 15:30 CET | Bancé 45', 86'; Šimák 56' | Report | Meier 13', 20'; Korkmaz 62' | Attendance: 20,300 |

| 1 May 2010 33 | Eintracht Frankfurt | 1–2 | 1899 Hoffenheim | Commerzbank-Arena, Frankfurt |
| 15:30 CET | Schwegler 20' | Report | Tagoe 80', 88' | Attendance: 50,500 |

| 8 May 2010 34 | VfL Wolfsburg | 3–1 | Eintracht Frankfurt | Volkswagen Arena, Wolfsburg |
| 15:30 CET | Misimović 21'; Riether 31'; Džeko 34' | Report | Altıntop 86' | Attendance: 30,000 |

=== DFB-Pokal ===
| 2 August 2009 1 | Kickers Offenbach | 0–3 | Eintracht Frankfurt | Bieberer Berg, Offenbach |
| 17:30 CET | | Report | Schwegler 71'; Caio 75'; Meier 86' | Attendance: 24,000 |

| 23 September 2009 2 | Eintracht Frankfurt | 6–4 | Alemannia Aachen | Commerzbank-Arena, Frankfurt |
| 19:00 CET | Caio 1'; Liberopoulos 5', 50'; Szukała 39' (o.g.); Meier 53'; Teber 89' (pen.) | Report | Gueye 23', 87'; Auer 65', 72' | Attendance: 25,450 |

| 28 October 2009 3 | Eintracht Frankfurt | 0–4 | Bayern Munich | Commerzbank-Arena, Frankfurt |
| 20:30 CET | | Report | Klose 14', 19'; Müller 29'; Toni 52' | Attendance: 51,500 |

== Sources ==
- Matheja, Ulrich (2011). Unsere Eintracht - Eintracht Frankfurt - Die Chronik. Die Werkstatt. ISBN 978-3-89533-750-5.
- Official English Eintracht website
- Eintracht-Archiv.de
- 2009–10 Eintracht Frankfurt season at Fussballdaten.de (in German)
