= 2008–09 Eintracht Frankfurt season =

Eintracht Frankfurt
2008–09 season
- Manager: Friedhelm Funkel
- Stadium: Waldstadion
- Bundesliga: 13th
- DFB-Pokal: Second round
- Top goalscorer: Nikos Liberopoulos (9)
Home colours	Away colours	Third colours

Eintracht Frankfurt started the 2008–09 season competing in the Bundesliga and the DFB-Pokal.

== Players ==
=== First-team squad ===
Squad at end of season

Note: Flags indicate national team as defined under FIFA eligibility rules; some limited exceptions apply. Players may hold more than one non-FIFA nationality.

No.	Pos.	Nation	Player
1	GK	MKD	Oka Nikolov (Note: Nikolov was born in Erbach im Odenwald, West Germany, but also qualified to represent Macedonia (now North Macedonia) internationally and made his international debut for Macedonia in September 1998.)
2	DF	GER	Patrick Ochs
3	DF	SRB	Nikola Petković
4	DF	GER	Christoph Preuß
5	DF	MKD	Aleksandar Vasoski
6	MF	GER	Michael Fink
7	MF	GER	Benjamin Köhler
8	MF	BIH	Zlatan Bajramović (Note: Bajramović was born in Hamburg, West Germany, but also qualified to represent Bosnia and Herzegovina internationally through his parents and made his international debut for Bosnia and Herzegovina in 2002.)
9	FW	CMR	Léonard Kweuke (on loan from DAC 1904)
10	FW	GRE	Nikos Liberopoulos
11	MF	AUT	Ümit Korkmaz
13	DF	GER	Markus Steinhöfer
14	MF	GER	Alexander Meier
15	DF	IRI	Mehdi Mahdavikia
16	DF	SUI	Christoph Spycher

No.	Pos.	Nation	Player
17	FW	CZE	Martin Fenin
18	FW	GRE	Ioannis Amanatidis
19	DF	ALG	Habib Bellaïd (Note: Bellaïd was born in Bobigny, France, and represented France at U-16, U-17, U-18, U-19 and U-21 level, but also qualified to represent Algeria and Tunisia internationally through his mother and father respectively and made his international debut for Algeria in May 2010.)
20	MF	JPN	Junichi Inamoto
21	GK	GER	Markus Pröll
22	MF	CRO	Krešo Ljubičić (Note: Ljubičić was born in Hanau, West Germany, but also qualified to represent Croatia internationally and represented Croatia at U-17, U-18, U-19, U-20 and U-21 level.)
23	DF	GER	Marco Russ
24	DF	GER	Martin Hess
26	FW	GER	Juvhel Tsoumou (Note: Tsoumou was born in Brazzaville, the Congo, but was raised in Germany from the age of 10 and represented Germany at U-18 and U-19 level before making his international debut for the Congo in September 2017.)
27	DF	GER	Alexander Krük
28	GK	GER	Jan Zimmermann
29	DF	BRA	Chris
30	MF	BRA	Caio
32	MF	GER	Faton Toski (Note: Toski was born in Gjilan, SFR Yugoslavia (now Kosovo), but was raised in Germany and represented Germany at U-19 level before making his international debut for Kosovo in March 2014.)
38	DF	GER	Sebastian Jung

=== Left club during season ===
Note: Flags indicate national team as defined under FIFA eligibility rules; some limited exceptions apply. Players may hold more than one non-FIFA nationality.

No. / Pos. / Nation / Player; 3 / DF / MEX / Aarón Galindo (to Guadalajara)	No. / Pos. / Nation / Player; 9 / MF / GER / Marcel Heller (on loan to MSV Duisburg)

=== Eintracht Frankfurt II ===
Note: Flags indicate national team as defined under FIFA eligibility rules; some limited exceptions apply. Players may hold more than one non-FIFA nationality.

No.	Pos.	Nation	Player
31	FW	GER	Patrick Mayer
33	DF	GER	Jürgen Mössmer
34	GK	GER	Frank Lehmann (on loan from VfB Stuttgart II)
35	DF	GER	Norman Theuerkauf
36	MF	GER	Richard Weil
37	DF	GER	Timothy Chandler (Note: Chandler was born in Frankfurt, West Germany, but also qualified to represent the United States internationally through his father and made his international debut for the United States in March 2011.)

No.	Pos.	Nation	Player
39	FW	GER	Cenk Tosun (Note: Tosun was born in Wetzlar, Germany, and represented Germany at U-16, U-18, U-19 and U-21 level, but also qualified to represent Turkey internationally and represented Turkey at U-21 and B level before making his international debut for Turkey in October 2013.)
—	GK	GER	Erman Muratagic
—	DF	GER	Stefano Cincotta (Note: Cincotta was born in Guatemala City, Guatemala, but was raised in Germany and also qualified to represent Italy internationally through his father, and represented Germany at U-17, U-19 and U-20 level before making his international debut for Guatemala in 2015.)
—	MF	GER	Marcel Titsch-Rivero
—	FW	GER	Marcos Álvarez

== Transfers ==
In:

Player	From	Fee
(Bosnia and Herzegovina) Zlatan Bajramović	Schalke 04	Free
(France) Habib Bellaïd	Strasbourg	€2,500,000
(Austria) Ümit Korkmaz	Rapid Wien	€2,300,000
(Germany) Alexander Krük	Kickers Emden	Free
(Cameroon) Léonard Kweuke	DAC Dunajská Streda	On loan until June 2009
(Greece) Nikos Liberopoulos	AEK Athens	Free
(Germany) Jürgen Mössmer	Eintracht Frankfurt U23	–
(Serbia) Nikola Petković	Red Star Belgrade (was on loan from Gençlerbirliği)	€1,200,000
(Germany) Markus Steinhöfer	Red Bull Salzburg (was on loan from Bayern Munich II)	€900,000
(Germany) Norman Theuerkauf	Eintracht Frankfurt U23	–

Out:

Player	To	Fee
(Germany) Mounir Chaftar	MSV Duisburg	Free
(Germany) Danny Galm	Energie Cottbus	Undisclosed
(Mexico) Aarón Galindo	Guadalajara	€1,000,000
(Germany) Marcel Heller	MSV Duisburg	Loaned until June 2009
(Greece) Sotirios Kyrgiakos	AEK Athens	Free
(Greece) Evangelos Mantzios	Panathinaikos	Was on loan
(Austria) Markus Weissenberger	LASK Linz	Free

== Results ==
Results for Eintracht Frankfurt for season 2008–09.

NOTE: scores are written Eintracht first
NOTE: fixtures marked with a * are not scheduled yet definitely

Date	Venue	Opponents	Score	Competition	Eintracht scorers	Match Report
5 July 2008	Am Steinchen, Grävenwiesbach	Hochtaunus XI	11–0	F	Fink (3), Meier, Ljubičić (2), Heller (2), Steinhöfer, Toski, Tsoumou	eintracht-archiv.de
12 July 2008	Parkstadion, Zell am Ziller	WSG Wattens	2–0	F	Bellaïd, Heller	eintracht-archiv.de
16 July 2008	MAR Arena, Pyrbaum	SV Seligenporten	1–1	F	Tsoumou	eintracht-archiv.de
19 July 2008	Sportstadion, Wolfsberg	Wolfsberger AC/SK St. Andrä	4–0	F	Fenin, Bellaïd, Chris, Ljubičić	eintracht-archiv.de
22 July 2008	Drei-Lärchen-Stadion, Bad Bleiberg	Wigan Athletic	2–0	F	Amanatidis, Bramble (Og)	wiganlatics.co.uk
26 July 2008	TBA, Bad Kleinkirchheim	Palermo	1–1	F	Fenin	eintracht-archiv.de
30 July 2008	FC-Astoria Stadion, Walldorf	Astoria Walldorf	0–1	F		eintracht-archiv.de
2 August 2008	Brettachtalstadion, Bretzfeld	FC Augsburg	1–0	F	Liberopoulos	eintracht-archiv.de
6 August 2008	Stadion auf dem Stephanshügel, Limburg an der Lahn	VfR Limburg	19–1	F	Liberopoulos (3), Chris, Amanatidis (4, 1 pen), Bellaïd, Fenin (3), Tsoumou (5), Ljubičić, Caio	eintracht-archiv.de
9 August 2008	ALNO-Arena, Pfullendorf	SC Pfullendorf	3–0	GC	Chris (2), Liberopoulos	eintracht-archiv.de
12 August 2008	Commerzbank-Arena, Frankfurt am Main	Real Madrid	1–1	F	Bellaïd	realmadrid.com
17 August 2008	Commerzbank-Arena, Frankfurt am Main	Hertha BSC	0–2	BL		ESPN
24 August 2008	RheinEnergieStadion, Cologne	1. FC Köln	1–1	BL	Fenin	ESPN
26 August 2008	Stadion Leeheim, Riedstadt	Riedstadt XI	9–1	F	Caio (2), Sequenz (o.g.), Liberopoulos, Mahdavikia, Fenin (3), Tsoumou	eintracht-archiv.de
30 August 2008	Volkswagen Arena, Wolfsburg	VfL Wolfsburg	2–2	BL	Amanatidis, Toski	ESPN
3 September 2008	Sportpark Neu-Isenburg, Neu-Isenburg	SpVgg 03 Neu-Isenburg	6–1	F	Caio, Meier, Mahdavikia, Tsoumou (3)	eintracht-archiv.de
16 September 2008	Herbert-Dröse-Stadion, Hanau	FC Hanau 93	15–0	F	Liberopoulos (2, 1 pen), Fenin (4), Meier (3), Steinhöfer (2), Toski, Caio (2), Ochs	eintracht-archiv.de
20 September 2008	Veltins-Arena, Gelsenkirchen	Schalke 04	0–1	BL		ESPN
23 September 2008	Commerzbank-Arena, Frankfurt am Main	Hansa Rostock	1–2 (ET)	GC	Fenin	eintracht-archiv.de
28 September 2008	Commerzbank-Arena, Frankfurt am Main	Arminia Bielefeld	1–1	BL	Köhler	ESPN
30 September 2008	Am Hopfenbrunnen, Frankfurt-Kalbach	FC Kalbach	7–0	F	Liberopoulos, Russ, Tsoumou (3), Toski, Steinhöfer	eintracht-archiv.de
4 October 2008	Carl-Benz-Stadion, Mannheim	1899 Hoffenheim	1–2	BL	Steinhöfer	ESPN
18 October 2008	Commerzbank-Arena, Frankfurt am Main	Bayer Leverkusen	0–2	BL		ESPN
22 October 2008	Commerzbank-Arena, Frankfurt am Main	Karlsruher SC	2–1	BL	Köhler, Amanatidis	ESPN
25 October 2008	Stadion der Freundschaft, Cottbus	Energie Cottbus	3–2	BL	Fink, Fenin, Liberopoulos	ESPN
29 October 2008	Commerzbank-Arena, Frankfurt am Main	Bayern Munich	1–2	BL	Demichelis (o.g.)	ESPN
2 November 2008	Borussia-Park, Mönchengladbach	Borussia Mönchengladbach	2–1	BL	Fenin, Fink	ESPN
9 November 2008	Commerzbank-Arena, Frankfurt am Main	VfB Stuttgart	2–2	BL	Liberopoulos (2)	ESPN
15 November 2008	Westfalenstadion, Dortmund	Borussia Dortmund	0–4	BL		ESPN
22 November 2008	Commerzbank-Arena, Frankfurt am Main	Hannover 96	4–0	BL	Liberopoulos (2), Russ, Fenin	ESPN
29 November 2008	Weserstadion, Bremen	Werder Bremen	0–5	BL		ESPN
6 December 2008	Commerzbank-Arena, Frankfurt am Main	VfL Bochum	4–0	BL	Liberopoulos (2, 1 pen), Steinhöfer, Russ	ESPN
13 December 2008	HSH Nordbank Arena, Hamburg	Hamburger SV	0–1	BL		ESPN
3 January 2008	Gerry Weber Stadion, Halle (Westfalen)	VfL Osnabrück	4–4	IT	Fenin, Vasoski, Toski, Köhler	eintracht-archiv.de
3 January 2008	Gerry Weber Stadion, Halle (Westfalen)	MSV Duisburg	6–2	IT	Russ (2), Tosun (2), Ochs, Fink	eintracht-archiv.de
3 January 2008	Gerry Weber Stadion, Halle (Westfalen)	Arminia Bielefeld	6–5	IT (semi-final match)	Ochs (3), Steinhöfer, Tosun, Ljubičić	eintracht-archiv.de
3 January 2008	Gerry Weber Stadion, Halle (Westfalen)	Rot Weiss Ahlen	4–2	IT (final match)	Fenin, Vasoski, Ljubičić, Krük	eintracht-archiv.de
4 January 2008	Ballsporthalle, Frankfurt am Main	Kickers Offenbach	0–0	IT		eintracht-archiv.de
4 January 2008	Ballsporthalle, Frankfurt am Main	SV Wehen	4–2	IT	Fenin, Ljubičić, Steinhöfer, Tosun	eintracht-archiv.de
4 January 2008	Ballsporthalle, Frankfurt am Main	Mainz 05	0–1	IT (semi-final match)		eintracht-archiv.de
4 January 2008	Ballsporthalle, Frankfurt am Main	VfL Wolfsburg	5–3	IT (third place play-off)	Mössmer, Tosun, Fink, Ochs, Fenin	eintracht-archiv.de
5 January 2008	SAP Arena, Mannheim	1. FC Kaiserslautern	0–1	IT		eintracht-archiv.de
5 January 2008	SAP Arena, Mannheim	TSG Hoffenheim	7–5	IT	Steinhöfer (2), Krük, Caio, Tsoumou, Köhler	eintracht-archiv.de
5 January 2008	SAP Arena, Mannheim	Brøndby IF	5–2	IT (semi-final match)	Köhler (2), Russ, Fink, Caio	eintracht-archiv.de
5 January 2008	SAP Arena, Mannheim	SV Waldhof Mannheim	4–3	IT (final match)	Mössmer, Tsoumou, Ljubičić, Steinhöfer	eintracht-archiv.de
11 January 2009	Albufeira, Portugal	Rot-Weiß Oberhausen	4–1	F	Meier, Vasoski, Kweuke (2)	eintracht-archiv.de
13 January 2009	Vale do Lobo, Portugal	FC Augsburg	2–3	F	Fenin, Kweuke	eintracht-archiv.de
17 January 2009	Stadion Oberwerth, Koblenz	TuS Koblenz	0–0	F		eintracht-archiv.de
24 January 2009	Playmobil-Stadion, Fürth	SpVgg Greuther Fürth	3–1	F	Meier (2), Kweuke	eintracht-archiv.de
31 January 2009	Olympic Stadium, Berlin	Hertha BSC	1–2	BL	Köhler	ESPN
7 February 2009	Commerzbank-Arena, Frankfurt am Main	1. FC Köln	2–2	BL	Russ, Fenin	ESPN
14 February 2009	Commerzbank-Arena, Frankfurt am Main	VfL Wolfsburg	0–2	BL		ESPN
21 February 2009	Wildparkstadion, Karlsruhe	Karlsruher SC	1–0	BL	Caio	ESPN
28 February 2009	Commerzbank-Arena, Frankfurt am Main	FC Schalke 04	1–2	BL	Fink	ESPN
8 March 2009	SchücoArena, Bielefeld	Arminia Bielefeld	0–0	BL		ESPN
14 March 2009	Commerzbank-Arena, Frankfurt am Main	1899 Hoffenheim	1–1	BL	Fink	ESPN
21 March 2009	Rheinstadion, Düsseldorf	Bayer Leverkusen	1–1	BL	Meier	ESPN
27 March 2009	Stadion am Halberg, Taunusstein	SV Wehen	0–2	F		eintracht-archiv.de
4 April 2009	Commerzbank-Arena, Frankfurt am Main	Energie Cottbus	2–1	BL	Liberopoulos (pen), Steinhöfer	ESPN
11 April 2009	Allianz Arena, Munich	Bayern Munich	0–4	BL		ESPN
18 April 2009	Commerzbank-Arena, Frankfurt am Main	Borussia Mönchengladbach	4–1	BL	Meier, Liberopoulos, Russ, Fink	ESPN
25 April 2009	Mercedes-Benz Arena, Stuttgart	VfB Stuttgart	0–2	BL		ESPN
2 May 2009	Commerzbank-Arena, Frankfurt am Main	Borussia Dortmund	0–2	BL		ESPN
9 May 2009	AWD-Arena, Hanover	Hannover 96	1–1	BL	Korkmaz	ESPN
13 May 2009	Commerzbank-Arena, Frankfurt am Main	Werder Bremen	0–5	BL		ESPN
16 May 2009	RewirpowerSTADION, Bochum	VfL Bochum	0–2	BL		ESPN
19 May 2009	Höchster Stadtpark, Frankfurt-Höchst	SG 01 Hoechst	17–1	F	Liberopoulos (4), Fenin (4), Caio (3), Korkmaz (2), Toski (2), Steinhöfer, Meier	eintracht-archiv.de
23 May 2009	Commerzbank-Arena, Frankfurt	Hamburger SV	2–3	BL	Meier, Caio	ESPN
26 May 2009	FSG Sportpark, Bensheim	FSG Bensheim	11–2	F	Caio (4), Fink, Steinhöfer, Jung, Nikolov, Kühn, Ochs	eintracht-archiv.de

Key:

- BL = Bundesliga
- GC = German Cup (DFB-Pokal)
- F = Friendly match
- IT = Indoor tournament

== Sources ==
- Matheja, Ulrich (2011). Unsere Eintracht - Eintracht Frankfurt - Die Chronik. Die Werkstatt. ISBN 978-3-89533-750-5.
- Official English Eintracht website
- Eintracht-Archiv.de
- 2008–09 Eintracht Frankfurt season at Fussballdaten.de (in German)
