= 2010–11 Gaziantepspor season =

Gaziantepspor
2010–11 season
- President: İbrahim Halil Kızıl
- Manager: Tolunay Kafkas
- Stadium: Gaziantep Kamil Ocak Stadium
- Turkish Super League: 4th (Week 32)
- Turkish Cup: Semi-finals
- Top goalscorer: Olcan Adın (13)
- Highest home attendance: 15,000(v Fenerbahçe, 13 November 2010)
- Lowest home attendance: 5,000 (v Gençlerbirliği, 30 January 2011)
Home colours	Away colours

The 2010–11 Gaziantepspor season will be the 25th consecutive season for Gaziantep in the Turkish Super League.They will also compete in the Turkish Cup

== Current squad ==
As of 9 January 2011

Note: Flags indicate national team as defined under FIFA eligibility rules; some limited exceptions apply. Players may hold more than one non-FIFA nationality.

No.	Pos.	Nation	Player
1	GK	(Lithuania) LTU	Žydrūnas Karčemarskas
22	GK	(Turkey) TUR	Mahmut Bezgin
34	GK	(Turkey) TUR	Eray Birniçan
--	GK	(Turkey) TUR	Hakan Duyan-Burton
2	DF	(Turkey) TUR	Yalçın Ayhan
3	DF	(Turkey) TUR	Elyasa Süme
4	DF	(Turkey) TUR	Emre Güngör
6	DF	(Brazil) BRA	Ivan
27	DF	(Turkey) TUR	Soner Örnek
13	DF	(Cameroon) CMR	Dany Nounkeu
14	DF	(Turkey) TUR	Şenol Can
16	DF	(Turkey) TUR	Serdar Kurtuluş
35	DF	(Turkey) TUR	Süleyman Özdamar
77	DF	(Turkey) TUR	Cenk Güvenç

No.	Pos.	Nation	Player
8	MF	(Argentina) ARG	Christian Rodrigo Zurita (captain)
21	MF	(Turkey) TUR	Gökhan Öztürk
5	MF	(Turkey) TUR	Murat Ceylan
25	MF	(Brazil) BRA	Wágner
29	MF	(Turkey) TUR	Olcan Adın
61	MF	(Turkey) TUR	Orhan Gülle
71	MF	(Bulgaria) BUL	Ivelin Popov
50	MF	(Turkey) TUR	Hürriyet Güçer
17	MF	(Turkey) TUR	Alper Akçam
99	FW	(Brazil) BRA	Júlio César
23	FW	(Germany) GER	Cenk Tosun
--	FW	(Turkey) TUR	Muhammet Demir
18	FW	(Argentina) ARG	Ismael Sosa
11	FW	(Brazil) BRA	Jorginho

=== Gaziantepspor transfers ===
In: Note: Flags indicate national team as defined under FIFA eligibility rules; some limited exceptions apply. Players may hold more than one non-FIFA nationality.

No.	Pos.	Nation	Player
—	FW	(Turkey) TUR	Muhammet Demir (free, from Bursaspor)
—	MF	(Turkey) TUR	Hürriyet Güçer (free, from Ankaragücü)
—	DF	(Turkey) TUR	Şenol Can (free, from Antalyaspor)
—	DF	(Turkey) TUR	Yalçın Ayhan (free, from Antalyaspor)
—	DF	(Turkey) TUR	Elyasa Süme (free, from Ankaragücü)
—	DF	(Turkey) TUR	Emre Güngör (€1,000,000, from Galatasaray)
—	FW	(Turkey) TUR	Alper Akçam (unknown, from (Germany) Kaiserslautern)
—	MF	(Turkey) TUR	Orhan Gülle (free, from Beşiktaş)
—	FW	(Argentina) ARG	Ismael Sosa (€3,500,000, from (Argentina) Independiente)
—	MF	(Bulgaria) BUL	Ivelin Popov (€1,500,000, from (Bulgaria) Litex Lovech)
—	DF	(Cameroon) CMR	Dany Nounkeu (undisclosed, from (France) Toulouse FC)
—	FW	(Germany) GER	Cenk Tosun (€550,000, from (Germany) Eintracht Frankfurt)
—	MF	(Brazil) BRA	Wágner (€3,600,000, from (Russia) FC Lokomotiv Moscow)

Out: Note: Flags indicate national team as defined under FIFA eligibility rules; some limited exceptions apply. Players may hold more than one non-FIFA nationality.

No.	Pos.	Nation	Player
-	DF	(Croatia) CRO	Stjepan Tomas (free, to Bucaspor)
-	GK	(Turkey) TUR	Recep Biler (unknown, to Manisaspor)
-	DF	(Turkey) TUR	Erkan Sekman (free, to Antalyaspor)
-	DF	(Cameroon) CMR	Armand Deumi (free, to Karabükspor)
-	MF	(Turkey) TUR	Muhammet Kaya (undisclosed, to Gaziantep B.B.)
-	FW	(Turkey) TUR	Ümit Tütünci (undisclosed, to Giresunspor)
-	MF	(Turkey) TUR	Hakan Bayraktar (free, to Samsunspor)
-	MF	(Turkey) TUR	Mehmet Yozgatlı (unknown, to Gençlerbirliği)
-	FW	(Turkey) TUR	Mehmet Yılmaz (free, to Antalyaspor)

== Current coaching staff ==
Name	Country	Position
Tolunay Kafkas	(Turkey)	Technical director
Cüneyt Dumlupınar	(Turkey)	Assistant coach
Yusuf Bozfırat	(Turkey)	Doctor
Nihat Yüksel	(Turkey)	Goalkeeping coach

== Süper Lig ==
=== League table ===
Pos	Team	Pld	W	D	L	GF	GA	GD	Pts	Qualification or relegation
2	Trabzonspor	34	25	7	2	69	23	+46	82	Qualification to Champions League group stage (Note: Originally, Fenerbahçe qualified for the group stage and Trabzonspor qualified for the third qualifying round. Despite being eliminated in the third qualifying round and passed to the UEFA Europa League play-off round, Trabzonspor replaced Fenerbahçe after the Turkish Football Federation withdrew Fenerbahçe from the UEFA Champions League one day before the group stage draw due to match-fixing allegations. UEFA would then select Trabzonspor as their replacement.)
3	Bursaspor	34	17	10	7	50	29	+21	61	Qualification to Europa League third qualifying round
4	Gaziantepspor	34	17	8	9	44	33	+11	59	Qualification to Europa League second qualifying round
5	Beşiktaş	34	15	9	10	53	36	+17	54	Qualification to Europa League play-off round (Note: Beşiktaş have won the 2010–11 Turkish Cup competition and thus are qualified for the play-off round of the UEFA Europa League.)
6	Kayserispor	34	14	9	11	46	44	+2	51	

Source: tff.org (in Turkish)
Rules for classification: 1) points; 2) goal difference; 3) number of goals scored.

==== Matches ====
Kickoff times are in EET.

14 August 2010 Round 1	Gaziantepspor	0 – 0	Kasımpaşa S.K.	Gaziantep Kamil Ocak Stadium, Gaziantep
20:00

22 August 2010 Round 2	Gençlerbirliği S.K.	0 – 0	Gaziantepspor	Ankara 19 Mayıs Stadium, Ankara
20:00

27 August 2010 Round 3	Gaziantepspor	2 – 2	Konyaspor	Gaziantep Kamil Ocak Stadium, Gaziantep
21:00

13 September 2010 Round 4	Galatasaray	1 – 0	Gaziantepspor	Ali Sami Yen Stadium, Istanbul
21:30	Kewell (yellow card) 52' (goal) 60' (pen.)	(Report) (Referee report)	(yellow card) 48' Popov; (yellow card) 50' Elyasa; (yellow card) 86' Yalçın; (yellow card) 88' Ivan	Referee: Bünyamin Gezer

20 September 2010 Round 5	Gaziantepspor	0 – 3	Bursaspor	Gaziantep Kamil Ocak Stadium, Gaziantep
20:00

25 September 2010 Round 6	Eskişehirspor	0 – 1	Gaziantepspor	Eskişehir Atatürk Stadium, Eskişehir
19:00

3 October 2010 Round 7	Sivasspor	1 – 1	Gaziantepspor	Sivas 4 Eylül Stadium, Sivas
15:30

16 October 2010 Round 8	Gaziantepspor	2 – 0	Bucaspor	Adana 5 Ocak Stadium, Adana
17:30

23 October 2010 Round 9	İstanbul B.B.	1 – 0	Gaziantepspor	Atatürk Olympic Stadium, Istanbul
15:30

30 October 2010 Round 10	Gaziantepspor	0 – 0	Karabükspor	Gaziantep Kamil Ocak Stadium, Gaziantep
17:30

6 November 2010 Round 11	MKE Ankaragücü	0 – 2	Gaziantepspor	Ankara 19 Mayıs Stadium, Ankara
17:00

13 November 2010 Round 12	Gaziantepspor	2 – 0	Fenerbahçe	Gaziantep Kamil Ocak Stadium, Gaziantep
19:00	S. Kurtuluş (yellow card) 53' (goal) 78'; Taşdelen (yellow card) 62'; Yalçın (yellow card) 70'; Olcan 85'	Report	18' (yellow card) 67' Alex; (yellow card) 36' Bekir	Attendance: 15,000; Referee: Tolga Özkalfa

21 November 2010 Round 13	Antalyaspor	0 – 1	Gaziantepspor	Mardan Sports Complex, Antalya
14:30

27 November 2010 Round 14	Gaziantepspor	1 – 3	Trabzonspor	Gaziantep Kamil Ocak Stadium, Gaziantep
16:00	Güngör 3'		30', 40' Burak; 75' Jajá

4 December 2010 Round 15	Manisaspor	2 – 0	Gaziantepspor	Manisa 19 Mayıs Stadium, Manisa
14:00

12 December 2010 Round 16	Gaziantepspor	2 – 0	Kayserispor	Gaziantep Kamil Ocak Stadium, Gaziantep
17:00

19 December 2010 Round 17	Beşiktaş	1 – 1	Gaziantepspor	BJK İnönü Stadium, Istanbul
19:00	Ali 65'		59' Olcan	Referee: Halis Özkahya

23 January 2011 Round 18	Kasımpaşa S.K.	0 – 1	Gaziantepspor	Recep Tayyip Erdoğan Stadium, Istanbul
14:00

30 January 2011 Round 19	Gaziantepspor	1 – 1	Gençlerbirliği S.K.	Gaziantep Kamil Ocak Stadium, Gaziantep
17:00				Attendance: 5,000

6 February 2011 Round 20	Konyaspor	0 – 2	Gaziantepspor	Konya Atatürk Stadium, Konya
14:00				Attendance: 11,200

12 February 2011 Round 21	Gaziantepspor	1 – 0	Galatasaray	Gaziantep Kamil Ocak Stadium, Gaziantep
19:00	Ismael Sosa 5'	(Report)		Attendance: 10,300; Referee: Yunus Yıldırım

19 February 2011 Round 22	Bursaspor	1 – 4	Gaziantepspor	Bursa Atatürk Stadium, Bursa
16:00	Dany Nounkeu o.g.' (34)	(Report)	23' Wágner; 32'Yalçın Ayhan; 62', 75' Cenk Tosun	Attendance: 18,000; Referee: Hüseyin Göçek

26 February 2011 Round 23	Gaziantepspor	2 – 1	Eskişehirspor	Gaziantep Kamil Ocak Stadium, Gaziantep
17:00	Cenk Tosun 3', 37'	(Report)	87' Ümit Karan	Attendance: 11,000; Referee: Barış Şimşek

5 March 2011 Round 24	Gaziantepspor	3 – 1	Sivasspor	Gaziantep Kamil Ocak Stadium, Gaziantep
15:30	Wágner 4'; Popov 25'; Cenk Tosun 64'	(Report)	40' Erman Kılıç	Attendance: 12,350; Referee: Fırat Aydınus

13 March 2011 Round 25	Bucaspor	2 – 1	Gaziantepspor	Buca Arena, İzmir
15:30	Ragıp Başdağ 10'; Ali Kuçik 39'	(Report)	11' Cenk Tosun	Attendance: 5,200; Referee: Yunus Yıldırım

19 March 2011 Round 26	Gaziantepspor	4 – 1	İstanbul B.B.	Gaziantep Kamil Ocak Stadium, Gaziantep
15:30	Hürriyet Güçer 7'; Olcan Adın 33', 65', 71'	(Report)	62' Filip Hološko	Attendance: 12,000; Referee: Bünyamin Gezer

2 April 2011 Round 27	Karabükspor	3 – 2	Gaziantepspor	Yenişehir Stadium, Karabük
14:00	Yasin Avcı 41'; Emil Angelov 63'; İlhan Parlak 90'	(Report)	7' Ivan Saraiva de Souza; 7' Olcan Adın	Attendance: 6,500; Referee: Fırat Aydınus

10 April 2011 Round 28	Gaziantepspor	3 – 2	MKE Ankaragücü	Gaziantep Kamil Ocak Stadium, Gaziantep
14:00	Cenk Tosun 61', 76'; Olcan Adın 58'	(Report)	65' Jan Rajnoch; 8' Özgür Çek	Attendance: 8,500; Referee: Suat Arslanboğa

16 April 2011 Round 29	Fenerbahçe	1 – 0	Gaziantepspor	Şükrü Saracoğlu Stadium, Istanbul
19:00	Emre (yellow card) 12'; Niang (yellow card) 21'; Lugano (yellow card) 44'; Semih (yellow card) 77'; Santos 90+4'	(Report)	(yellow card) 13' Dany; (yellow card) 36' Popov; (yellow card) 40' Güçer; (yellow card) 44' Güngör; (yellow card) 44' (yellow-red card) 84' Ceylan; (yellow card) 68' Sosa; (yellow card) 69' Wagner; (yellow card) 77' Şenol Can; (yellow card) 89' Zurita; (yellow card) 90' Elyasa	Attendance: 48,650; Referee: Hüseyin Göçek

24 April 2011 Round 30	Gaziantepspor	2 – 1	Antalyaspor	Gaziantep Kamil Ocak Stadium, Gaziantep
16:00	Cenk Tosun 60', 77'	(Report)	65' Kenan Özer	Attendance: 11,500; Referee: Serkan Çınar

1 May 2011 Round 31	Trabzonspor	3 – 0	Gaziantepspor	Hüseyin Avni Aker, Trabzon
19:00	Burak Yılmaz 23', 44'; Paweł Brożek 36'	(Report)		Attendance: 21,250; Referee: Cüneyt Çakır

7 May 2011 Round 32	Gaziantepspor	1 – 0	Manisaspor	Gaziantep Kamil Ocak Stadium, Gaziantep
20:00	Olcan Adın 70'	(Report)		Attendance: 8,200; Referee: Bünyamin Gezer

15 May 2011 Round 33	Kayserispor	1 – 2	Gaziantepspor	Kadir Has Stadium, Kayseri
16:00	Önder Turacı 80'	(Report)	64' Olcan Adın; 85' Murat Ceylan	Attendance: 20,000; Referee: Fırat Aydınus

21 May 2011 Round 34	Gaziantepspor	0 – 0	Beşiktaş	Gaziantep Kamil Ocak Stadium, Gaziantep
19:00		(Report)		Attendance: 13,000; Referee: Barış Şimşek

== Turkish Cup ==
=== Group A ===
Pos	Team	Pld	W	D	L	GF	GA	GD	Pts
1	Gaziantepspor	4	3	1	0	7	2	+5	10
2	Galatasaray	4	2	2	0	7	3	+4	8
3	Beypazarı Şekerspor	4	1	1	2	4	7	−3	4
4	Antalyaspor	4	0	3	1	4	6	−2	3
5	Denizlispor	4	0	1	3	4	8	−4	1

Source: tff.org (in Turkish)
Rules for classification: 1) points; 2) goal difference; 3) number of goals scored.

==== Group stage ====
9 November 2010 Match Day 1	Antalyaspor	1 – 3	Gaziantepspor	Mardan Sports Complex, Antalya
	Djiehoua 20'		58' Ismael Sosa; 78' Ivelin Popov; 89' Ahmet Arı	Referee: Fethi Serkan Koçak

22 December 2010 Match Day 2	Gaziantepspor	1 – 1	Galatasaray	Gaziantep Kamil Ocak Stadium, Gaziantep
	6' Ivelin Popov		12' Juan Pablo Pino	Referee: Bülent Yıldırım

12 January 2011 Match Day 3	Denizlispor	0 – 1	Gaziantepspor	Denizli Atatürk Stadium, Denizli
			90+3' Şenol Can	Referee: Hüseyin Sabancı

26 January 2011 Match Day 4	Gaziantepspor	2 – 0	Beypazarı Şekerspor	Gaziantep Kamil Ocak Stadium, Gaziantep
	Júlio César 20'; Alper Çam 30'			Referee: Mustafa Öğretmenoğlu

==== Quarter-finals ====
2 February 2011	Gaziantepspor	3 – 2	Galatasaray	Gaziantep, Turkey
	Cenk Tosun 19, 79'; Elyasa Süme 67'		38' Kazım Kazım; 62' Bogdan Stancu	Stadium: Gaziantep Kamil Ocak Stadium; Referee: Özgür Yankaya

2 March 2011	Galatasaray	0 – 0	Gaziantepspor	Istanbul, Turkey
20:00				Stadium: Türk Telekom Arena; Attendance: 26.500; Referee: Cüneyt Çakır

==== Semi-finals ====
6 April 2011	Beşiktaş	3 – 0	Gaziantepspor	Istanbul, Turkey
20:00	64', 86' Simão Sabrosa; 75' Hugo Almeida; (yellow card) 16' İbrahim Toraman; (yellow card) 24' Roberto Hilbert; (yellow card) 56' Fabian Ernst; (yellow card) 81' Necip Uysal		(yellow card) 18' Olcan Adın; (yellow card) 39' Murat Ceylan; (yellow card) 63' Hürriyet Güçer; (yellow card) 66' Emre Güngör; (yellow card) 78' Jorginho; (yellow card) 90'90 Ivan	Stadium: BJK İnönü Stadium; Referee: Bülent Yıldırım

20 April 2011	Gaziantepspor	2 – 2	Beşiktaş	Gaziantep, Turkey
19:00	Olcan Adın 5, 68'		Simão Sabrosa 33' (pen.); Hugo Almeida 49'	Stadium: Gaziantep Kamil Ocak Stadium; Attendance: 13,200; Referee: Kuddusi Müftüoğlu
