= Juvhel Tsoumou =

Congolese footballer (born 1990)

Personal information
- Full name: Hama Juvhel Fred Tsoumou
- Date of birth: 27 December 1990 (age 35)
- Place of birth: Brazzaville, Congo
- Height: 1.91 m (6 ft 3 in)
- Position: Forward

Youth career
- 2001–2003: FSV Zwickau
- 2003–2006: Eintracht Frankfurt
- 2006–2007: Blackburn Rovers
- 2007–2008: Eintracht Frankfurt

Senior career*
Years	Team	Apps	(Gls)
2008–2010	Eintracht Frankfurt II	35	(10)
2008–2010	Eintracht Frankfurt	10	(1)
2010–2011	Alemannia Aachen	6	(0)
2010–2011	Alemannia Aachen II	12	(4)
2011–2012	Preston North End	16	(3)
2012	→ Plymouth Argyle (loan)	11	(2)
2012–2013	Hartberg	28	(6)
2013	Senica	12	(1)
2014–2015	Waldhof Mannheim	17	(1)
2015–2017	Wacker Burghausen	55	(29)
2017–2018	Ermis Aradippou	29	(8)
2018–2019	Hermannstadt	41	(8)
2019–2020	FCSB	2	(1)
2020–2021	Liaoning Shenyang Urban	8	(1)
2021	Viitorul Constanța	18	(4)
2021–2022	Wydad AC	24	(2)
2023	Cong An Hanoi	1	(3)
2023	Rapid București	3	(0)
2024	Police Tero	13	(6)
2025	Hebar	9	(0)

International career
2008	Germany U18	2	(0)
2008	Germany U19	1	(0)
2017–2021	Congo	3	(0)
- * Club domestic league appearances and goals as of 26 June 2025

Hama Juvhel Fred Tsoumou (born 27 December 1990) is a Congolese professional footballer who plays as a forward.

Tsoumou started his professional career in Germany with Eintracht Frankfurt, and has since played for various sides in England, Slovakia, Cyprus, Romania, China, Morocco, Vietnam and Bulgaria.

Born in the Republic of the Congo, Tsoumou represented Germany at youth international level and changed his allegiance to Congo at senior level.

== Club career ==
=== Early career ===
Tsoumou was raised in the Congolese capital Brazzaville where he showed his talent on sand pitches. As a 10-year-old, Tsoumou came with his mother, who was studying economics, to Zwickau, where he began to play in the youth system of FSV Zwickau.

In 2003, Charly Körbel led him to the Eintracht Frankfurt football academy. Here he played until July 2006 before moving to the academy of Blackburn Rovers.

=== Eintracht Frankfurt ===
After a season in England he returned to Eintracht because he saw a better future for himself at Frankfurt. On 4 September 2007, due to call-ups for the national youth team, Eintracht manager Friedhelm Funkel gave Tsoumou the chance to train with the first squad. For the Bundesliga match on 10 November 2007 against Borussia Dortmund the striker was in the squad for the first time. Youth Coordinator, Holger Mueller gave an interview on him and compared Tsoumou to Jermaine Jones due to his athleticism and ball-winning ability.

Tsoumou debuted in the Bundesliga on 28 September 2008 against Arminia Bielefeld, when he was substituted in the 74th minute for Nikos Liberopoulos. Since making his debut, Tsoumou moved to the reserves where he was able to get more playing time and scored 5 in 29 appearances or spent time on the bench when he joined the first-team squad. On 20 March 2010, Tsuomou scored his first goal for Frankfurt in the 87th minute to equalise against Bayern Munich but Martin Fenin scored a winning goal in a 2–1 win.

=== Alemannia Aachen ===
He signed a contract with Alemannia Aachen on 4 August 2010. On 20 August 2010, Tsoumou made his debut for the club in a 2–2 draw against Union Berlin. However, Tsoumou, once again, was not able as he spent time on the bench when he joined the first-team squad or moved to the reserves.

In 2011, he had a trial spell at Sheffield Wednesday.

=== Preston North End ===
After a successful trial, Tsoumou signed a two-year deal with Preston North End. On 4 October 2011, he scored his first goal for Preston against Morecambe in the Johnstones Paint Trophy. Preston went on to win 7–6 on penalties after the game had finished 2–2. He scored his first goal in English football against Huddersfield Town with a tap in from Iain Hume's cross. He then scored in Preston's next two fixtures against Oldham Athletic and AFC Bournemouth respectively. However under new manager Graham Westley, Tsoumou struggled to get playing time.

He was transfer listed by the club along with six other player in May 2012 in order for Westley to strengthen the Preston squad.

On 3 July 2012, his contract was cancelled by mutual consent despite having one year left on his contract.

==== Plymouth Argyle (loan) ====
On 31 January 2012, Tsoumou joined League Two side Plymouth Argyle on loan along with Alex MacDonald, until the end of the season. His move to Plymouth delighted manager Carl Fletcher. On 4 February 2012, Tsoumou made his debut for the club in a 2–2 draw against Southend United. On 31 March 2012, he scored his first goal for the club in a 1–0 win over Bradford City which was a winning goal. On 5 May 2012, in the last game of the season, Tsoumou scored Plymouth's only goal in the match against Cheltenham Town which Plymouth lost.

=== TSV Hartburg ===
On 13 September 2012, Tsoumou signed with Austrian club TSV Hartberg.

=== FK Senica ===
On 29 August 2013, he signed a two-year contract with FK Senica, following a free transfer. However his contract was cancelled and Tsoumou was released as a free agent on 1 January 2014.

=== Waldhof Mannheim ===
Tsoumou remained unattached until 14 November 2014 when he joined SV Waldhof Mannheim. He made 17 appearances, almost all from the bench, scoring 1 goal. He was released at the end of the 2014–15 Regionalliga season.

=== Wacker Burghausen ===
Tsoumou joined SV Wacker Burghausen on 3 September 2015.

=== FCSB ===
Tsoumou joined FCSB on 12 September 2019.

=== Hanoi Police FC ===
Tsoumou joined V.League 1 side Hanoi Police FC on 9 January 2023. He scored a hat-trick on his league debut against Binh Dinh FC on the opening day of the 2023 season.

== International career ==
Juvhel Tsoumou has been capped by Germany at under-18 and under-19 level. He made two appearances for the under-18s against France in March 2008. Tsoumou made his under-19 debut against England in November 2008, replacing Taner Yalçın as a second-half substitute.

He was pre-selected by Congo on 19 May 2017. Tsoumou made his debut for the Congo national football team in a 1-1 2018 FIFA World Cup qualification tie with Ghana on 1 September 2017.

== Career statistics ==
=== Club ===
As of match played 25 May 2025

Appearances and goals by club, season and competition
Club	Season	League			National cup (Note: Includes DFB-Pokal, FA Cup, Austrian Cup, Slovak Cup, Cupa României, Moroccan Throne Cup, Vietnam Cup)		League cup (Note: Includes League Cup)		Continental		Other		Total	
Club	Season	Division	Apps	Goals	Apps	Goals	Apps	Goals	Apps	Goals	Apps	Goals	Apps	Goals
Eintracht Frankfurt II	2007–08	Oberliga Hessen	5	4	—		—		—		—		5	4
Eintracht Frankfurt II	2008–09	Regionalliga Süd	8	3	—		—		—		—		8	3
Eintracht Frankfurt II	2009–10	Regionalliga Süd	22	3	—		—		—		—		22	3
Eintracht Frankfurt II	Total		35	10	—		—		—		—		35	10
Eintracht Frankfurt	2008–09	Bundesliga	6	0	0	0	—		—		—		6	0
Eintracht Frankfurt	2009–10	Bundesliga	4	1	0	0	—		—		—		4	1
Eintracht Frankfurt	Total		10	1	0	0	—		—		—		10	1
Alemannia Aachen	2010–11	2. Bundesliga	6	0	2	0	—		—		—		8	0
Alemannia Aachen II	2010–11	NRW-Liga	12	4	—		—		—		—		12	4
Preston North End	2011–12	Football League One	16	3	2	0	4	1	—		—		22	4
Plymouth Argyle (loan)	2011–12	Football League Two	11	2	—		—		—		—		11	2
Hartberg	2012–13	2. Liga	24	5	1	0	—		—		—		25	5
Hartberg	2013–14	2. Liga	4	1	1	0	—		—		—		5	1
Hartberg	Total		28	6	2	0	—		—		—		30	6
Senica	2013–14	Slovak First League	12	1	3	1	—		—		—		15	2
Waldhof Mannheim	2014–15	Regionalliga Südwest	17	1	0	0	—		—		—		17	1
Wacker Burghausen	2015–16	Regionalliga Bayern	25	13	0	0	—		—		—		25	13
Wacker Burghausen	2016–17	Regionalliga Bayern	30	16	3	1	—		—		—		33	17
Wacker Burghausen	Total		55	29	3	1	—		—		—		58	30
Ermis Aradippou	2017–18	Cypriot First Division	29	8	2	0	—		—		—		31	8
Hermannstadt	2018–19	Liga I	37	7	3	2	—		—		2	1	42	10
Hermannstadt	2019–20	Liga I	4	1	0	0	—		—		—		4	1
Hermannstadt	Total		41	8	3	2	—		—		2	1	46	11
FCSB	2019–20	Liga I	2	1	1	0	—		—		—		3	1
Liaoning Shenyang Urban	2020	China League One	8	1	—		—		—		—		8	1
Viitorul Constanța	2020–21	Liga I	10	3	—		—		—		—		10	3
Wydad AC	2021–22	Botola	23	2	5	1	—		11 (Note: Appearances in CAF Champions League)	2	—		39	5
Wydad AC	2022–23	Botola	1	0	—		—		—		—		1	0
Wydad AC	Total		24	2	5	1	—		11	2	—		40	5
Cong An Ha Noi	2023	V.League 1	1	3	1	0	—		–		–		2	3
Rapid București	2023–24	Liga I	3	0	1	0	—		—		—		4	0
Police Tero	2023–24	Thai League 1	13	6	—		—		—		—		13	6
Hebar	2024–25	Bulgarian First League	9	0	—		—		—		—		9	0
Career total			342	89	25	5	4	1	11	2	2	1	384	98

=== International ===
Appearances and goals by national team and year
National team	Year	Apps	Goals
Congo	2017	2	0
Congo	2018	0	0
Congo	2019	1	0
Total		3	0

== Honours ==
Wydad AC

- Botola Pro: 2021–22
- CAF Champions League: 2021-22
- Moroccan Throne Cup runner-up: 2021–22

Hanoi Police

- V.League 1: 2023
