= Cenk Tosun =

Turkish footballer (born 1991)

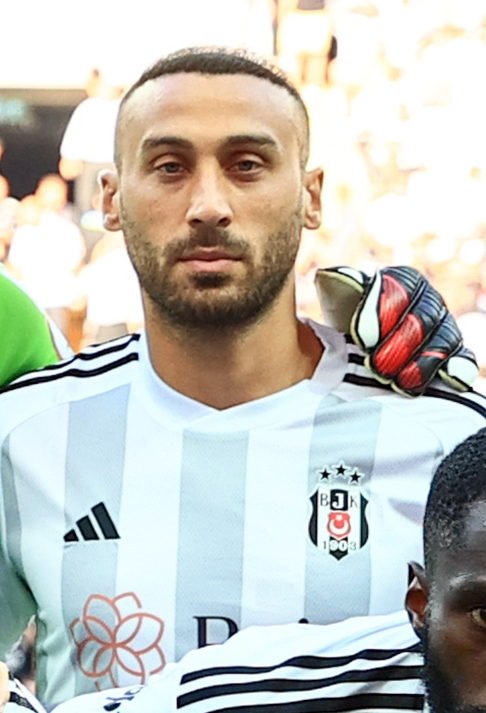
- Tosun with Beşiktaş in 2023

Personal information
- Full name: Cenk Tosun
- Date of birth: 7 June 1991 (age 35)
- Place of birth: Wetzlar, Germany
- Height: 1.83 m (6 ft 0 in)
- Position: Striker

Team information
- Current team: Fatih Karagümrük
- Number: 9

Youth career
- 1997–2008: Eintracht Frankfurt

Senior career*
Years	Team	Apps	(Gls)
2008–2010	Eintracht Frankfurt II	17	(12)
2009–2011	Eintracht Frankfurt	1	(0)
2011–2014	Gaziantepspor	109	(39)
2014–2018	Beşiktaş	96	(41)
2018–2022	Everton	50	(9)
2020	→ Crystal Palace (loan)	5	(1)
2021	→ Beşiktaş (loan)	3	(3)
2022–2024	Beşiktaş	66	(21)
2024–2026	Fenerbahçe	17	(1)
2026	Kasımpaşa	11	(1)
2026–	Fatih Karagümrük	0	(0)

International career
2006–2007	Germany U16	2	(1)
2008–2009	Germany U18	8	(6)
2009–2010	Germany U19	8	(6)
2010–2011	Germany U21	2	(1)
2012	Turkey U21	1	(0)
2011–2015	Turkey B	12	(7)
2013–2024	Turkey	53	(21)
- * Club domestic league appearances and goals as of 23:04, 9 May 2026 (UTC)

Cenk Tosun (Turkish: [dʒæɲc ˈtosun]; born 7 June 1991) is a professional footballer who plays as a striker for TFF First League club Fatih Karagümrük.

After making one Bundesliga appearance for Eintracht Frankfurt, Tosun transferred to Gaziantepspor in January 2011, where he won the Spor Toto Cup in 2012. In 2014, he was signed by Beşiktaş and won two Süper Lig titles before transferring to Everton in January 2018 for a reported £27 million transfer fee. After loans to fellow Premier League team Crystal Palace and back to Beşiktaş, he signed for the latter at the end of his contract in 2022.

Tosun was born in Germany and played for the representative teams of the German Football Association from under-16 to under-21 level. He then changed his allegiance to the Turkish Football Federation, for whom he made his senior international debut in 2013, and played at UEFA Euro 2016 and Euro 2024.

== Club career ==
=== Eintracht Frankfurt ===
Born in Wetzlar in the German state of Hesse, Tosun began his career with Eintracht Frankfurt. He played mainly for the reserves in the Regionalliga. His sole first team appearance was on 8 May 2010 in the final match of the 2009–10 Bundesliga season as a 75th-minute substitute for Martin Fenin in a 3–1 loss at VfL Wolfsburg.

=== Gaziantepspor ===
On 29 January 2011, Tosun joined Gaziantepspor for a €400,000 transfer fee. He scored 10 goals in 14 league matches in his debut season. After a less successful second season, he scored double digits in the following two campaigns and helped the club win the Spor Toto Cup in 2012. He scored twice in the final, a 3–1 win over Orduspor on 17 May 2012.

=== Beşiktaş ===
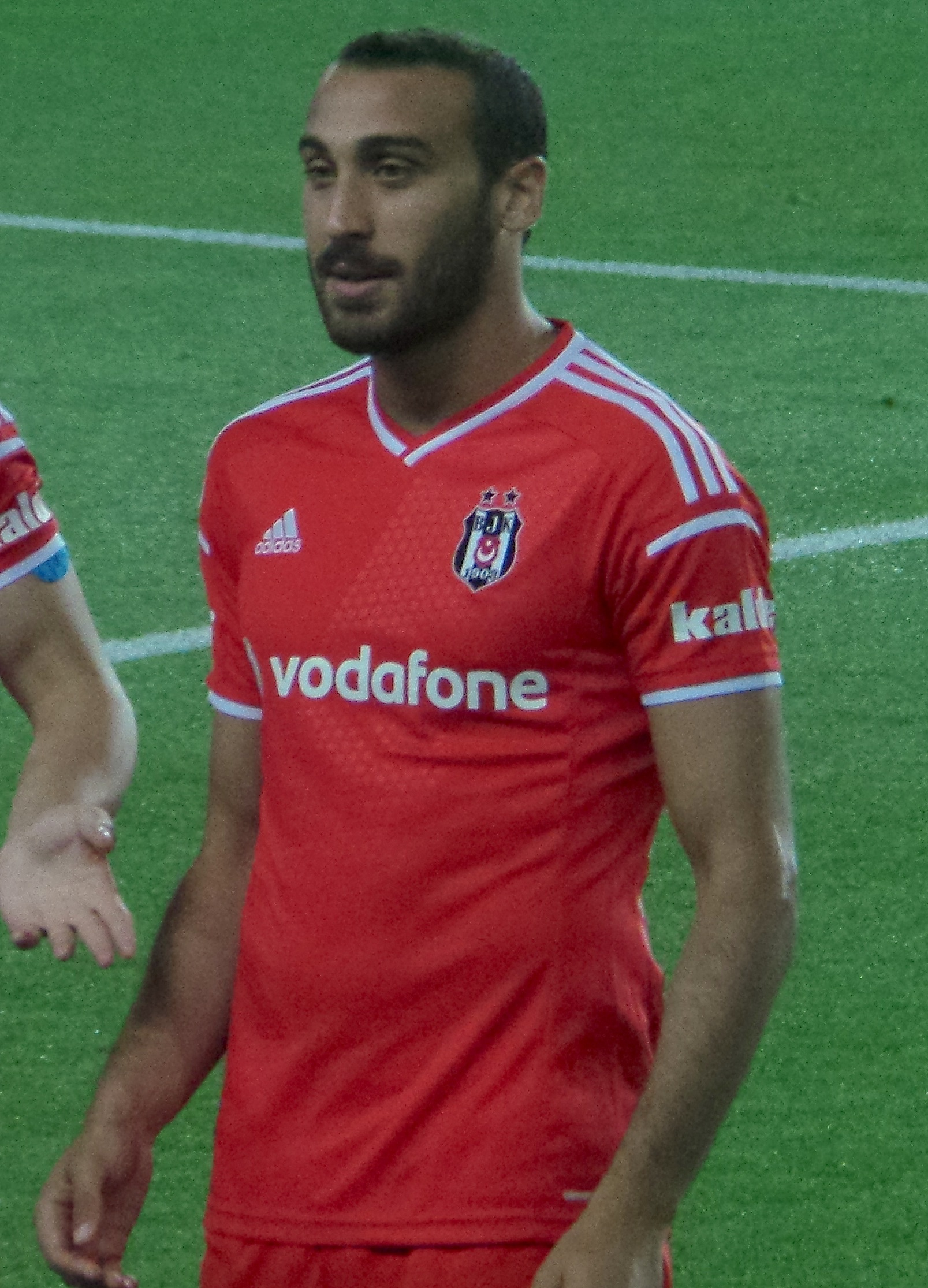
Tosun playing for Beşiktaş in 2014

On 4 February 2014, Beşiktaş signed Tosun on a five-year contract worth nearly €500,000, effective from the 2014–15 season. He chose the number 23 shirt after basketball player Michael Jordan. In his first two campaigns at the Istanbul club, he was mainly a substitute, behind Demba Ba and Mario Gómez in the pecking order. After Ba and Gómez left, he was a regular in the 2016–17 season, scoring 24 goals as his club won the Süper Lig title. He then turned down a move to Premier League club Crystal Palace.

In 2017–18, Tosun scored four goals in six matches as Beşiktaş won a UEFA Champions League group containing RB Leipzig, Porto and Monaco, including both of a 2–1 win at Monaco on 17 October.

=== Everton ===
On 5 January 2018, Tosun joined Premier League club Everton for a reported £27 million transfer fee, signing a four-and-a-half-year contract with the Merseyside club. He made his debut eight days later, playing 61 minutes of a 4–0 loss away to Tottenham Hotspur. He scored his first goal for the club in a 2–1 away loss against Burnley on 3 March. Manager Sam Allardyce praised Tosun when he received criticism for the start of his Everton career. Tosun and fellow new signing Theo Walcott helped an Everton side that had struggled for goals in the first half of the season as the club finished in eighth place in the 2017–18 Premier League.

Under new manager Marco Silva, Tosun lost his starting place to Dominic Calvert-Lewin and Moise Kean. However, he stayed at the club for the 2019–20 season after rejecting moves to Galatasaray S.K. and Qatar's Al-Gharafa SC.

==== Loan to Crystal Palace ====
Tosun moved on loan to Crystal Palace for the rest of the 2019–20 season on 10 January 2020. He made his debut the next day against Arsenal when he came on for Max Meyer in the 68th minute of the 1–1 home draw. In his next game, a first start on 18 January, he scored in a 2–2 draw away to reigning champions Manchester City.

In March, Tosun was sidelined with an anterior cruciate ligament (ACL) injury picked up during training. He returned to Everton for rehabilitation once surgery had been completed.

==== Loan to Beşiktaş ====
On 31 January 2021, Tosun returned to Beşiktaş on a loan deal until the end of the season. On his league debut on 15 February, he came on as a 62nd-minute replacement for Vincent Aboubakar and scored twice in a 3–0 win at Gençlerbirliği. He subsequently suffered another knee injury and was diagnosed with COVID-19.

=== Return to Beşiktaş ===
On 10 June 2022, Everton stated Tosun would be released at the end of the month once his contract expired. On 2 July 2022, Tosun signed with Beşiktaş for a third stint with the club. In his first full season back at the club, he scored 15 goals in 32 games, sixth best in the league and second best for Turkish players after Umut Nayir's 17 for Ümraniyespor; this included two on 2 April in a 4–2 win at Istanbul rivals Fenerbahçe.

=== Fenerbahçe ===
On 16 July 2024, Tosun signed a two-year contract with Fenerbahçe, the cross-town rivals of his old club, on a free transfer after his contract with Beşiktaş was expired and not renewed. On 19 January 2025, he made his first official goal in a 0–4 Süper Lig away victory against Adana Demirspor.

On 12 October 2025, Tosun was sidelined from the Fenerbahçe squad along with İrfan Can Kahveci.

On 15 January 2026, Fenerbahçe announced that his contract was terminated by mutual agreement.

=== Kasımpaşa ===
A day after leaving Fenerbahçe on 16 January 2026, Tosun joined fellow Turkish side Kasımpaşa. He scored his first goal in a 3–2 Süper Lig victory against Fatih Karagümrük.

=== Fatih Karagümrük ===
On 7 July 2026, Tosun joined Fatih Karagümrük.

== International career ==
=== Germany youth ===
Tosun played for Germany under-19 in qualification for the 2010 UEFA European Under-19 Championship. In the qualifying group in Luxembourg, he scored twice in a 5–0 win over Moldova and a consolation goal in a 2–1 loss to Turkey. He scored a hat-trick in a 4–1 win over Poland in the Elite Round, but Germany did not advance to the finals in France.

On 16 November 2010, Tosun made his under-21 debut in a 2–0 friendly win over England in Wiesbaden, scoring a penalty for the second goal.

=== Turkey ===
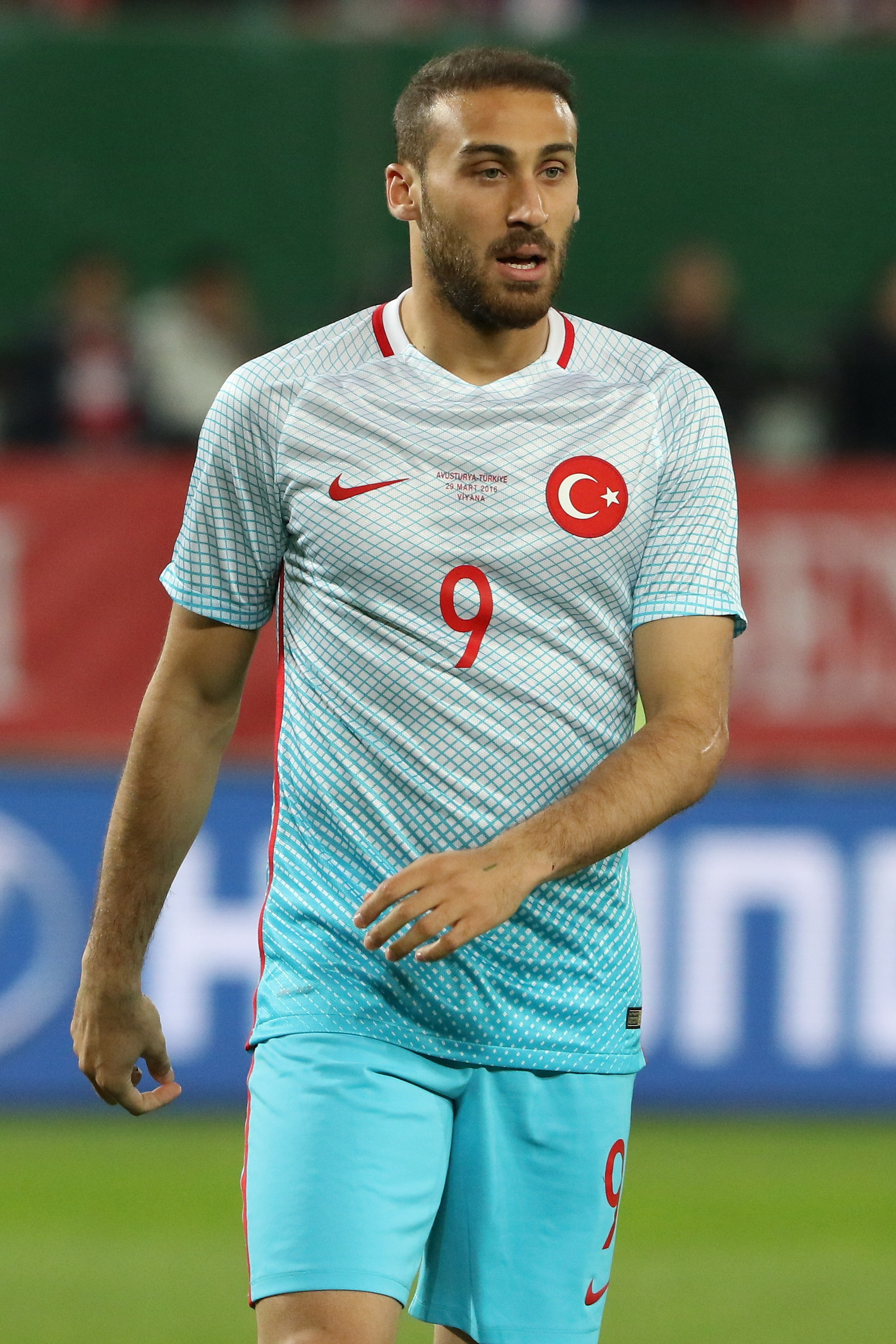
Tosun with Turkey in 2016

Tosun made his senior international debut for Turkey on 15 October 2013, replacing Selçuk İnan for the final 16 minutes of a 2–0 loss to the Netherlands in a 2014 FIFA World Cup qualifying match at the Şükrü Saracoğlu Stadium in Istanbul; the result ended the Turks' hope of qualification. On 13 November 2015, he scored his first international goal, the winner in a 2–1 friendly triumph away to Qatar. He added another two goals on 24 March 2016 in a 2–1 friendly win over Sweden in Antalya.

Tosun was part of the 23-man squad chosen by head coach Fatih Terim for UEFA Euro 2016 in France. He started in the opening match, a 1–0 loss to Croatia, but was dropped in favour of Burak Yılmaz for the following match against Spain. Tosun then returned as an added-time substitute in the 2–0 win over the Czech Republic in Lens that was not enough to take Turkey to the round of 16.

In Turkey's failed qualification campaign for the 2018 World Cup, Tosun scored five goals. These were braces in both matches against Finland, and the only goal of a home win over eventual qualifiers Croatia on 5 September 2017. On 1 June 2018, Tosun scored a penalty to open a 2–2 friendly draw with Tunisia in Geneva, then was sent-off for the first time in his career for a confrontation with the Turkish fans; he said he intervened because he thought his father was being attacked in the crowd.

Tosun was Turkey's top scorer with five goals in Turkey's successful UEFA Euro 2020 qualifying. These included braces in home and away 4–0 wins over Moldova. He missed the final tournament – delayed to 2021 because of the COVID-19 pandemic – due to injury.

On 7 June 2024, he was selected in the 26-man squad for UEFA Euro 2024. On 26 June, he scored a stoppage-time goal in a 2–1 victory over Czech Republic in the last group stage match, securing his country's qualification to the knockout phase for the first time since 2008.

== Style of play ==
Tosun has said his ability is equal with his left and right foot, as his father Senol forbade him from using his right foot in an attempt to strengthen his left. As a boy, he idolised Argentine forward Gabriel Batistuta. While Tosun likens himself to former strikers Mario Gómez and Zlatan Ibrahimović, The Times writer Gary Jacob instead found him more similar to the English strikers Kevin Davies and Andy Carroll for his physicality.

== Political views ==
On 11 October 2019, Tosun scored in the 90th minute of a 1–0 home win over Albania in a Euro 2020 qualifier, and was one of the Turkish players who participated in a "military salute" goal celebration. That same day, he published a photograph on Instagram in which he stated support for soldiers involved in the Turkish offensive into north-eastern Syria.

== Personal life ==
Tosun is a Muslim.

== Career statistics ==
=== Club ===
As of match played 9 May 2026

Appearances and goals by club, season and competition
Club	Season	League			National cup (Note: Includes Turkish Cup, FA Cup)		League cup (Note: Includes Spor Toto Cup, EFL Cup)		Europe		Other		Total	
Club	Season	Division	Apps	Goals	Apps	Goals	Apps	Goals	Apps	Goals	Apps	Goals	Apps	Goals
Eintracht Frankfurt	2009–10	Bundesliga	1	0	0	0	—		—		—		1	0
Gaziantepspor	2010–11	Süper Lig	14	10	4	2	—		—		—		18	12
Gaziantepspor	2011–12	Süper Lig	32	6	1	1	6	5	4 (Note: Appearances in UEFA Europa League)	0	—		43	12
Gaziantepspor	2012–13	Süper Lig	32	10	3	1	—		—		—		35	11
Gaziantepspor	2013–14	Süper Lig	31	13	1	1	—		—		—		32	14
Gaziantepspor	Total		109	39	9	5	6	5	4	0	—		128	49
Beşiktaş	2014–15	Süper Lig	18	5	2	3	—		8 (Note: Four appearances in UEFA Champions League, four appearances and one goal in UEFA Europa League)	1	—		28	9
Beşiktaş	2015–16	Süper Lig	29	8	8	7	—		6	2	—		43	17
Beşiktaş	2016–17	Süper Lig	33	20	1	0	—		12 (Note: Six appearances and one goal in UEFA Champions League, six appearances and four goals in UEFA Europa League)	4	1 (Note: Appearance in Turkish Super Cup)	0	47	24
Beşiktaş	2017–18	Süper Lig	16	8	1	1	—		6 (Note: Appearances in UEFA Champions League)	4	1	1	24	14
Beşiktaş	Total		96	41	12	11	—		32	11	2	1	142	64
Everton	2017–18	Premier League	14	5	0	0	—		—		—		14	5
Everton	2018–19	Premier League	25	3	2	1	2	0	—		—		29	4
Everton	2019–20	Premier League	5	1	0	0	3	0	—		—		8	1
Everton	2020–21	Premier League	5	0	2	1	0	0	—		—		7	1
Everton	2021–22	Premier League	1	0	2	0	0	0	—		—		3	0
Everton	Total		50	9	6	2	5	0	—		—		61	11
Crystal Palace (loan)	2019–20	Premier League	5	1	—		—		—		—		5	1
Beşiktaş (loan)	2020–21	Süper Lig	3	3	1	0	—		—		—		4	3
Beşiktaş	2022–23	Süper Lig	32	15	2	3	—		—		—		34	18
Beşiktaş	2023–24	Süper Lig	34	6	5	3	—		8 (Note: Appearances in UEFA Europa Conference League)	2	—		47	11
Beşiktaş	Total		69	24	8	6	—		8	2	—		85	32
Fenerbahçe	2024–25	Süper Lig	12	1	2	1	—		8 (Note: Two appearances in UEFA Champions League, five appearances in UEFA Europa League)	0	—		22	2
Fenerbahçe	2025–26	Süper Lig	5	0	0	0	—		2 (Note: One appearance in UEFA Champions League, one appearance in UEFA Europa League)	0	0	0	7	0
Fenerbahçe	Total		17	1	2	1	—		10	0	0	0	29	2
Kasımpaşa	2025–26	Süper Lig	11	1	—		—		—		—		11	1
Career total			358	116	37	25	11	5	54	13	2	1	462	160

=== International ===
As of match played 6 July 2024

Appearances and goals by national team and year
National team	Year	Apps	Goals
Turkey	2013	1	0
Turkey	2014	0	0
Turkey	2015	4	1
Turkey	2016	11	2
Turkey	2017	9	5
Turkey	2018	10	3
Turkey	2019	7	5
Turkey	2020	3	2
Turkey	2021	0	0
Turkey	2022	2	0
Turkey	2023	3	2
Turkey	2024	3	1
Total		53	21

Scores and results list Turkey's goal tally first, score column indicates score after each Tosun goal.

List of international goals scored by Cenk Tosun
No.	Date	Venue	Opponent	Score	Result	Competition
1	13 November 2015	Abdullah bin Khalifa Stadium, Doha, Qatar	Qatar	2–1	2–1	Friendly
2	24 March 2016	Antalya Stadium, Antalya, Turkey	Sweden	1–0	2–1	Friendly
3	24 March 2016	Antalya Stadium, Antalya, Turkey	Sweden	2–1	2–1	Friendly
4	24 March 2017	Antalya Stadium, Antalya, Turkey	Finland	1–0	2–0	2018 FIFA World Cup qualification
5	24 March 2017	Antalya Stadium, Antalya, Turkey	Finland	2–0	2–0	2018 FIFA World Cup qualification
6	5 September 2017	New Eskişehir Stadium, Eskişehir, Turkey	Croatia	1–0	1–0	2018 FIFA World Cup qualification
7	9 October 2017	Veritas Stadion, Turku, Finland	Finland	1–0	2–2	2018 FIFA World Cup qualification
8	9 October 2017	Veritas Stadion, Turku, Finland	Finland	2–1	2–2	2018 FIFA World Cup qualification
9	28 May 2018	Başakşehir Fatih Terim Stadium, Istanbul, Turkey	Iran	1–0	2–1	Friendly
10	28 May 2018	Başakşehir Fatih Terim Stadium, Istanbul, Turkey	Iran	2–0	2–1	Friendly
11	1 June 2018	Stade de Genève, Geneva, Switzerland	Tunisia	1–0	2–2	Friendly
12	25 March 2019	New Eskişehir Stadium, Eskişehir, Turkey	Moldova	2–0	4–0	UEFA Euro 2020 qualifying
13	25 March 2019	New Eskişehir Stadium, Eskişehir, Turkey	Moldova	3–0	4–0	UEFA Euro 2020 qualifying
14	10 September 2019	Zimbru Stadium, Chișinău, Moldova	Moldova	1–0	4–0	UEFA Euro 2020 qualifying
15	10 September 2019	Zimbru Stadium, Chișinău, Moldova	Moldova	3–0	4–0	UEFA Euro 2020 qualifying
16	11 October 2019	Şükrü Saracoğlu Stadium, Istanbul, Turkey	Albania	1–0	1–0	UEFA Euro 2020 qualifying
17	11 November 2020	Vodafone Park, Istanbul, Turkey	Croatia	1–0	3–3	Friendly
18	15 November 2020	Şükrü Saracoğlu Stadium, Istanbul, Turkey	Russia	3–1	3–2	2020–21 UEFA Nations League B
19	15 October 2023	Konya Metropolitan Municipality Stadium, Konya, Turkey	Latvia	2–0	4–0	UEFA Euro 2024 qualifying
20	15 October 2023	Konya Metropolitan Municipality Stadium, Konya, Turkey	Latvia	4–0	4–0	UEFA Euro 2024 qualifying
21	26 June 2024	Volksparkstadion, Hamburg, Germany	Czech Republic	2–1	2–1	UEFA Euro 2024

== Honours ==
Beşiktaş

- Süper Lig: 2015–16, 2016–17, 2020–21
- Turkish Cup: 2020–21, 2023–24

Individual

- Turkish Footballer of the Year: 2017
