= Wágner (footballer, born 1985) =

Brazilian footballer

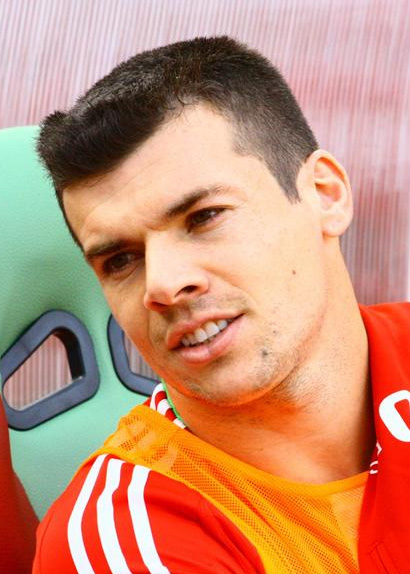

Personal information
- Full name: Wágner Ferreira dos Santos
- Date of birth: 29 January 1985 (age 41)
- Place of birth: Sete Lagoas, Brazil
- Height: 1.75 m (5 ft 9 in)
- Position: Attacking midfielder

Youth career
- 2001–2002: América Mineiro

Senior career*
Years	Team	Apps	(Gls)
2002–2004	América Mineiro	36	(8)
2004–2009	Cruzeiro	174	(27)
2007	→ Al-Ittihad	11	(4)
2009–2011	Lokomotiv Moscow	21	(3)
2011	Gaziantepspor	26	(3)
2012–2015	Fluminense	161	(22)
2015–2017	Tianjin Teda	20	(2)
2017–2018	Vasco da Gama	68	(9)
2018–2020	Al-Khor	24	(8)
2020–2022	Juventude	23	(4)
2022	Vila Nova	44	(2)

International career
	Brazil U20	2	(0)
- * Club domestic league appearances and goals

Wágner Ferreira dos Santos (born 29 January 1985), simply known as Wágner, is a Brazilian former footballer who played as an attacking midfielder.

== Club career ==
Born in Sete Lagoas, Minas Gerais, Wágner started his career at América Mineiro, where he shone along with Fred, an international Brazilian player, who, coincidentally, is again Wagner's colleague in Fluminense FC. Wágner went on to play for Cruzeiro, another team from Belo Horizonte. Cruzeiro sold Wágner to Al-Ittihad after a transfer fee of around €9 million in January 2007, but a clause in his contract allowed him to come back to Cruzeiro in June 2007 after Al-Ittihad could not finish paying his transfer fee. He was important in Al-Ittihad's championship run. On 7 August 2009 Championat.ru confirmed that Lokomotiv Moscow had acquired the Brazilian player, for 6 million euros.

On 17 January 2011 he signed for Gaziantepspor for €3 million.

After a feud with Gaziantepspor manager Abdullah Ercan, Wágner's contract was terminated by a mutual agreement.

== International career ==
He has played for the Brazil U17 and U21 squad.

He was also called up for the Brazil national team for a friendly in 2006, following the World Cup in Germany, by coach Dunga, but never played; the game finished Brazil 1-1 Norway. He was also placed in standby lists for the 2007 Copa América and the 2008 Summer Olympics.

== Style of play ==
Wagner is a left footed offensive midfielder and striker, but is also working on using his right foot. Despite playing all of the 2006 season as an offensive midfielder, he led the Campeonato Brasileiro, in its early stages, with eight goals in ten games. He is a free-kick specialist, scoring a majority of his goals through free-kicks.

== Career statistics ==
As of 29 November 2021

Club	Season	League			State League		Cup		Continental		Other		Total	
Club	Season	Division	Apps	Goals	Apps	Goals	Apps	Goals	Apps	Goals	Apps	Goals	Apps	Goals
América Mineiro	2002	Série B	0	0	0	0	—		—		1 (Note: Appearance(s) in Copa Sul-Minas)	0	1	0
América Mineiro	2003	Série B	6	1	6	1	—		—		—		12	2
América Mineiro	2004	Série B	14	3	10	3	2	1	—		—		26	7
América Mineiro	Total		20	4	16	4	2	1	—		1	0	39	9
Cruzeiro	2004	Série A	9	0	—		—		—		—		9	0
Cruzeiro	2005	Série A	35	1	10	0	6	0	4 (Note: Appearance(s) in Copa Sudamericana)	0	—		55	1
Cruzeiro	2006	Série A	32	11	10	2	5	0	1	1	—		48	14
Cruzeiro	2007	Série A	27	6	—		—		2	0	—		29	6
Cruzeiro	2008	Série A	28	5	10	2	—		10	2	—		48	9
Cruzeiro	2009	Série A	4	0	9	0	—		12 (Note: Appearance(s) in Copa Libertadores)	2	—		25	2
Cruzeiro	Total		135	23	39	4	11	0	29	5	—		214	32
Al-Ittihad (loan)	2006–07	Saudi Premier League	11	4	—		4	2	—		—		15	6
Lokomotiv Moscow	2009	Russian Premier League	7	3	—		—		—		—		7	3
Lokomotiv Moscow	2010	Russian Premier League	14	0	—		1	0	0	0	—		15	0
Lokomotiv Moscow	Total		21	3	—		1	0	0	0	—		22	3
Gaziantepspor	2010–11	Süper Lig	17	2	—		5	0	—		—		22	2
Gaziantepspor	2011–12	Süper Lig	9	1	—		0	0	4 (Note: Appearance(s) in UEFA Europa League)	1	—		13	2
Gaziantepspor	Total		26	3	—		5	0	4	1	—		35	4
Fluminense (loan)	2012	Série A	29	1	15	0	—		3	0	—		47	1
Fluminense (loan)	2013	Série A	33	4	16	3	0	0	10	2	—		59	9
Fluminense (loan)	2014	Série A	31	7	15	5	5	1	1	0	—		52	13
Fluminense (loan)	2015	Série A	9	1	13	1	0	0	—		—		22	2
Fluminense (loan)	Total		102	13	59	9	5	1	14	2	—		180	25
Tianjin Teda	2015	Chinese Super League	9	1	—		0	0	—		—		9	1
Tianjin Teda	2016	Chinese Super League	11	1	—		0	0	—		—		11	1
Tianjin Teda	Total		20	2	—		0	0	—		—		20	2
Vasco da Gama	2017	Série A	19	2	9	0	1	1	—		—		6	0
Vasco da Gama	2018	Série A	16	4	11	1	2	0	10 (Note: Nine appearances and one goal in Copa Libertadores, one appearance in Copa Sudamericana)	1	39	6		
Vasco da Gama	Total		35	6	20	1	3	1	10	1	—		68	9
Al-Khor	2018–19	Qatar Stars League	18	8	—		4	0	—		—		22	8
Al-Khor	2019–20	Qatar Stars League	6	0	—		1	0	—		—		7	0
Al-Khor	Total		24	8	—		5	0	—		—		29	8
Juventude	2020	Série B	8	1	—		3	1	—		—		11	2
Juventude	2021	Série A	12	2	0	0	0	0	—		—		12	2
Juventude	Total		20	3	0	0	3	1	—		—		23	4
Career total			414	69	134	18	39	6	57	9	1	0	645	102

== Honours ==
=== Club ===
Cruzeiro

- Campeonato Mineiro: 2006, 2008, 2009

Al-Ittihad

- Saudi Premier League: 2006–07

Fluminense

- Campeonato Carioca: 2012
- Campeonato Brasileiro Série A: 2012

=== Individual ===
- Bola de Prata: 2006, 2008
