= Sebastian Jung =

German footballer

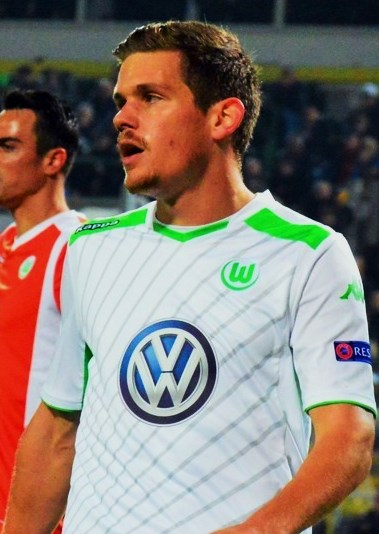
- Jung with VfL Wolfsburg in 2014

Personal information
- Full name: Sebastian Alexander Jung
- Date of birth: 22 June 1990 (age 36)
- Place of birth: Königstein im Taunus, West Germany
- Height: 1.79 m (5 ft 10 in)
- Position: Right back

Team information
- Current team: Karlsruher SC
- Number: 2

Youth career
- 1994–1998: 1. FC Königstein
- 1998–2009: Eintracht Frankfurt

Senior career*
| Years | Team | Apps | (Gls) |
| 2008–2009 | Eintracht Frankfurt II | 30 | (1) |
| 2009–2014 | Eintracht Frankfurt | 148 | (4) |
| 2014–2019 | VfL Wolfsburg | 40 | (0) |
| 2016–2018 | VfL Wolfsburg II | 7 | (0) |
| 2019–2020 | Hannover 96 | 9 | (0) |
| 2020– | Karlsruher SC | 127 | (5) |

International career^{‡}
| 2007–2008 | Germany U18 | 4 | (0) |
| 2009–2010 | Germany U20 | 9 | (0) |
| 2010–2013 | Germany U21 | 19 | (0) |
| 2014 | Germany | 1 | (0) |
- * Club domestic league appearances and goals as of 18 May 2026 ‡ National team caps and goals as of 20:52, 13 May 2014 (UTC)

Sebastian Alexander Jung (born 22 June 1990) is a German professional footballer who plays as a right back for Karlsruher SC in the 2. Bundesliga.

== Club career ==
Jung played his first Bundesliga match for Eintracht Frankfurt, and first fully professional game, on 8 March 2009 in a 0–0 draw against Arminia Bielefeld, as a substitute for Patrick Ochs. On 7 February 2010, he scored his first Bundesliga goal at Signal Iduna Park against Borussia Dortmund. He became a regular in the Frankfurt first team during the 2010–11 season, during which they were surprisingly relegated from the Bundesliga, but was almost ever-present the following season as they bounced back at the first attempt. He extended his contract on 4 April 2013 until 30 June 2015.

He joined VfL Wolfsburg on 22 May 2014 and signed a contract until 30 June 2018. Although he was still under contract with Frankfurt, Wolfsburg were able to acquire his services by fulfilling a release clause in the amount of €2.5 million. His annual salary at Wolfsburg was reported as €4 million.

On 23 June 2019, Jung joined Hannover 96 on a one-year contract.

After his contract in Hannover had expired, Jung joined Karlsruher SC on 22 September 2020 on a one-year contract.

== International career ==
Jung played for the German U18, U21, and U21 national teams.

On 11 November 2012, Jung was first called up to the German senior squad, following injury related withdrawals by several players, including Holger Badstuber and Jérôme Boateng, before a friendly against Netherlands on 14 November 2012. He is the first Eintracht Frankfurt player to be called up to the national team since Horst Heldt in 1999. Nevertheless, he did not play in the match.

Almost two years later, in May 2014, he was called up for the second time. In a 0–0 draw in a friendly against Poland in Hamburg he made his debut by being substituted in the 71st minute for fellow debutant Kevin Volland. Originally this match was scheduled as a test for the 2014 FIFA World Cup. But unfortunately its date collided with the DFB-Pokal final between FC Bayern Munich and Borussia Dortmund, the FA Cup Final including Arsenal and the Champions League final including Real Madrid. The players of these four teams made up the vast majority of the regular German squad at that time. Consequently, only ten of the 30 nominated players of the preliminary world cup squad were available and in the end twelve players made their debuts in the match.

== Career statistics ==
As of matches played on 4 August 2021

Appearances and goals by club, season and competition
| Club | Season | League | | | Cup | | Continental | | Total | | Ref. |
| Club | Season | Division | Apps | Goals | Apps | Goals | Apps | Goals | Apps | Goals | Ref. |
|---|---|---|---|---|---|---|---|---|---|---|---|
| Eintracht Frankfurt | 2008–09 | Bundesliga | 6 | 0 | 0 | 0 | — | | 6 | 0 | |
| Eintracht Frankfurt | 2009–10 | Bundesliga | 14 | 1 | 0 | 0 | — | | 14 | 1 | |
| Eintracht Frankfurt | 2010–11 | Bundesliga | 33 | 0 | 3 | 0 | — | | 36 | 0 | |
| Eintracht Frankfurt | 2011–12 | 2. Bundesliga | 33 | 2 | 2 | 0 | — | | 35 | 2 | |
| Eintracht Frankfurt | 2012–13 | Bundesliga | 32 | 1 | 1 | 0 | — | | 33 | 1 | |
| Eintracht Frankfurt | 2013–14 | Bundesliga | 30 | 0 | 4 | 0 | 6 | 1 | 40 | 1 | |
| Eintracht Frankfurt | Total | | 148 | 4 | 10 | 0 | 6 | 1 | 164 | 5 | — |
| Eintracht Frankfurt II | 2008–09 | Regionalliga Süd | 16 | 0 | — | | — | | 16 | 0 | |
| Eintracht Frankfurt II | 2009–10 | Regionalliga Süd | 7 | 1 | — | | — | | 7 | 1 | |
| Eintracht Frankfurt II | Total | | 23 | 1 | 0 | 0 | 0 | 0 | 23 | 1 | — |
| VfL Wolfsburg | 2014–15 | Bundesliga | 22 | 0 | 2 | 0 | 6 | 0 | 30 | 0 | |
| VfL Wolfsburg | 2015–16 | Bundesliga | 11 | 0 | 1 | 0 | 4 | 0 | 16 | 0 | |
| VfL Wolfsburg | 2016–17 | Bundesliga | 4 | 0 | 0 | 0 | — | | 4 | 0 | |
| VfL Wolfsburg | 2017–18 | Bundesliga | 2 | 0 | 2 | 0 | — | | 4 | 0 | |
| VfL Wolfsburg | 2018–19 | Bundesliga | 1 | 0 | 0 | 0 | — | | 1 | 0 | |
| VfL Wolfsburg | Total | | 40 | 0 | 5 | 0 | 10 | 0 | 55 | 0 | — |
| VfL Wolfsburg II | 2016–17 | Regionalliga Nord | 3 | 0 | — | | — | | 3 | 0 | |
| VfL Wolfsburg II | 2017–18 | Regionalliga Nord | 3 | 0 | — | | — | | 3 | 0 | |
| VfL Wolfsburg II | 2018–19 | Regionalliga Nord | 1 | 0 | — | | — | | 1 | 0 | |
| VfL Wolfsburg II | Total | | 7 | 0 | 0 | 0 | 0 | 0 | 7 | 0 | — |
| Hannover 96 | 2019–20 | 2. Bundesliga | 9 | 0 | 1 | 0 | — | | 10 | 0 | |
| Karlsruher SC | 2020–21 | 2. Bundesliga | 7 | 0 | 0 | 0 | — | | 7 | 0 | |
| Karlsruher SC | 2020–21 | 2. Bundesliga | 2 | 1 | 0 | 0 | — | | 2 | 1 | |
| Karlsruher SC | Total | | 9 | 1 | 0 | 0 | 0 | 0 | 9 | 1 | — |
| Career total | | | 236 | 6 | 16 | 0 | 16 | 1 | 268 | 7 | — |

== Honours ==
Eintracht Frankfurt

- 2. Bundesliga Runners-up: 2011–12

VfL Wolfsburg

- DFB-Pokal: 2014–15
