= Selim Teber =

German footballer (born 1981)

Personal information
- Full name: Ufuk Selim Teber
- Date of birth: 7 March 1981 (age 45)
- Place of birth: Frankenthal, West Germany
- Height: 1.87 m (6 ft 2 in)
- Position: Midfielder

Youth career
- 1987–1988: ASV Edigheim
- 1988–1991: SV Pfingstweide
- 1991–1998: VfR Frankenthal
- 1999: Waldhof Mannheim

Senior career*
| Years | Team | Apps | (Gls) |
| 1999–2002 | Waldhof Mannheim | 70 | (9) |
| 2002–2003 | 1. FC Kaiserslautern II | 16 | (3) |
| 2002–2005 | 1. FC Kaiserslautern | 37 | (2) |
| 2004 | → SV Salzburg (loan) | 15 | (4) |
| 2005 | Denizlispor | 4 | (0) |
| 2006–2009 | 1899 Hoffenheim | 79 | (10) |
| 2009–2010 | Eintracht Frankfurt | 29 | (1) |
| 2010–2011 | Kayserispor | 32 | (2) |
| 2011–2012 | Samsunspor | 3 | (0) |
| 2012–2013 | Karabükspor | 8 | (0) |
| 2013–2014 | MKE Ankaragücü | 14 | (1) |
| Total | | 307 | (32) |

International career
| 2002–2003 | Germany U21 | 5 | (0) |
- * Club domestic league appearances and goals

Selim Teber (born 7 March 1981) is a German former professional footballer who played as a midfielder.

== Career ==
Teber was a member of the 1899 Hoffenheim team that won promotion to the 2. Bundesliga.

In July 2009 Teber left Hoffenheim and signed on 30 June 2009 a contract with Eintracht Frankfurt. In the summer of 2010 Selim Teber signed for Kayserispor. Teber can also play as a striker.

In September 2013, he joined MKE Ankaragücü on a two-year contract, which was then terminated early on 16 October 2014.

== Personal life ==
Teber is married and has one daughter.
