= Matthias Cuntz =

German footballer

Personal information
- Full name: Matthias Cuntz
- Date of birth: 4 May 1990 (age 36)
- Place of birth: Karlsruhe, West Germany
- Height: 1.84 m (6 ft 1/2 in)
- Position: Midfielder

Team information
- Current team: SV Elversberg
- Number: 23

Youth career
- 1998–2009: Karlsruher SC

Senior career*
Years	Team	Apps	(Gls)
2009–2010	Karlsruher SC II	19	(2)
2009–2012	Karlsruher SC	21	(0)
2012–2013	→ SCR Altach (loan)	16	(0)
2012–2014	Eintracht Trier	29	(4)
2014–	SV Elversberg	27	(3)
- * Club domestic league appearances and goals as of 6 June 2015

Matthias Cuntz (born 4 May 1990 in Karlsruhe) is a German footballer who plays for SV Elversberg.

Cuntz made his debut for Karlsruhe on 5 February 2010, in a 2–1 away defeat against St. Pauli, coming off the bench to replace Marco Engelhardt in the 61st minute.
