= Hürriyet Gücer =

Turkish footballer

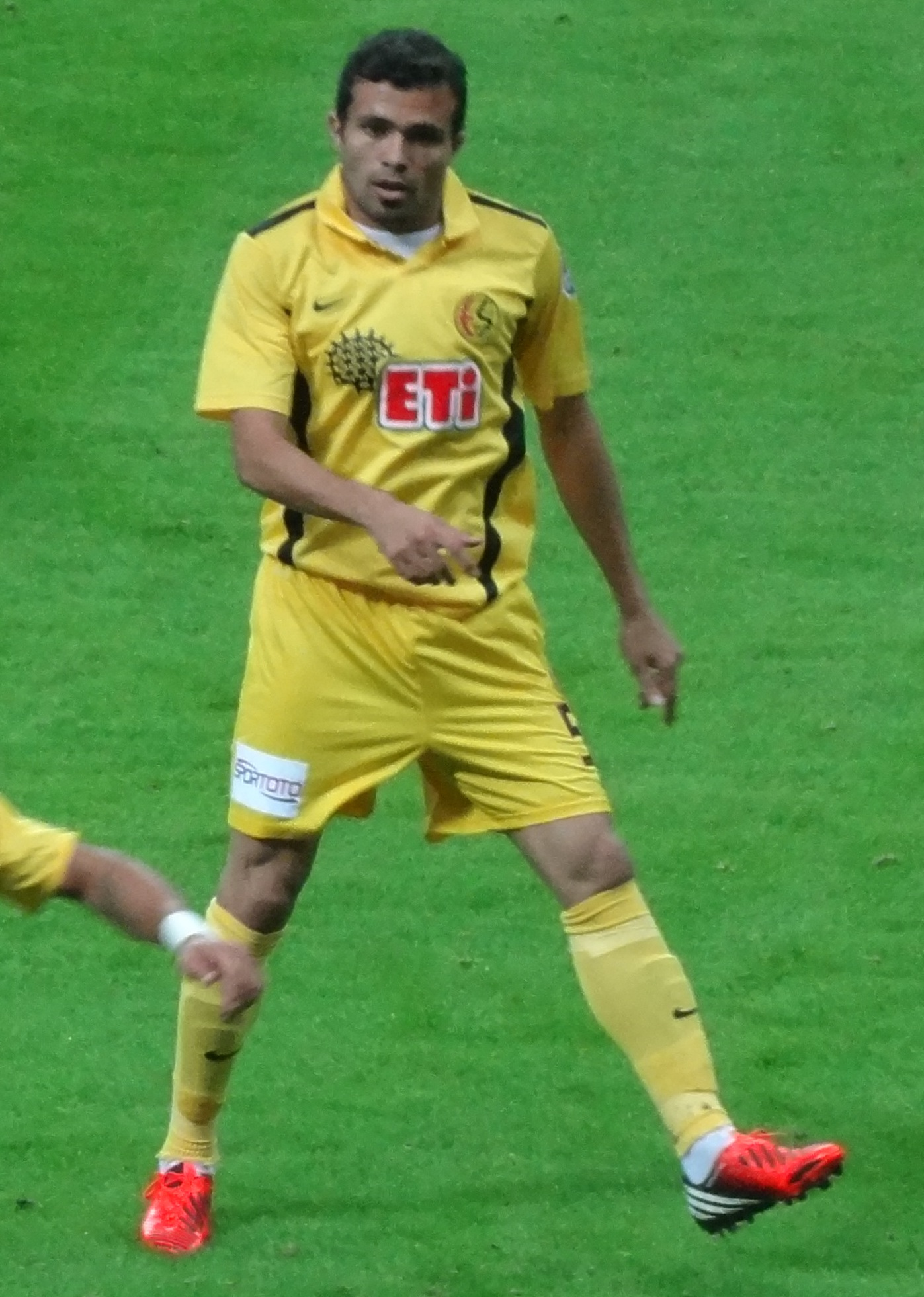

Personal information
- Date of birth: 25 October 1981 (age 45)
- Place of birth: Nevşehir, Turkey
- Height: 1.76 m (5 ft 9 in)
- Position: Defensive midfielder

Youth career
- 1992–1999: Nevşehirspor

Senior career*
Years	Team	Apps	(Gls)
1999–2010	Ankaraspor	301	(11)
2009–2010	→ Ankaragücü (loan)	26	(1)
2010–2012	Ankaragücü	6	(0)
2011	→ Gaziantepspor (loan)	11	(1)
2012–2015	Eskişehirspor	89	(3)
2016	Gaziantepspor	9	(0)
2016–2018	Eskişehirspor	56	(1)

International career
1999	Turkey U17	3	(0)
1999	Turkey U18	1	(0)
2000	Turkey U19	1	(0)
2001	Turkey U20	1	(0)
2005–2006	Turkey A2	3	(0)
- * Club domestic league appearances and goals

Hürriyet Gücer (born 25 October 1981) is a Turkish former professional footballer. He played as a defensive midfielder.
