= Şenol Can =

Bulgarian footballer

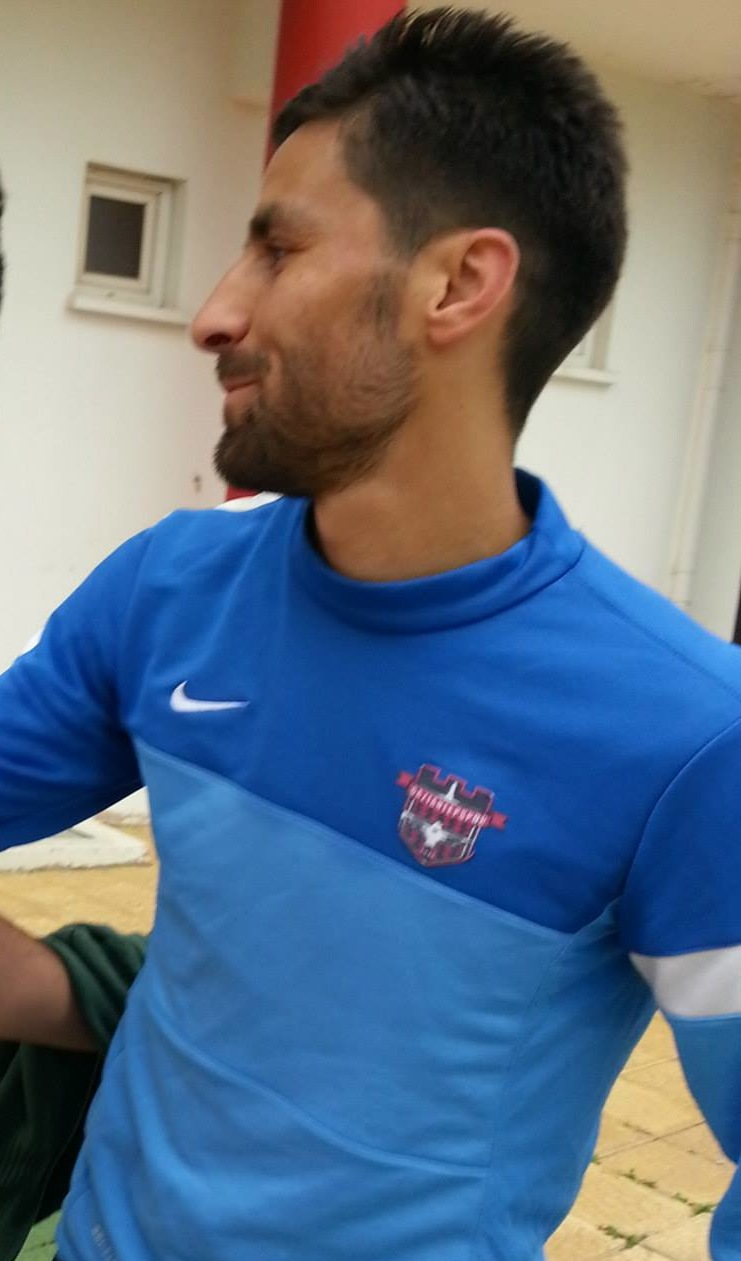

Personal information
- Date of birth: 3 April 1983 (age 43)
- Place of birth: Kardzhali, Bulgaria
- Height: 1.82 m (6 ft 0 in)
- Position: Left back

Team information
- Current team: Sarıyer (head coach)

Youth career
- Bursa Merinosspor
- Bursaspor

Senior career*
| Years | Team | Apps | (Gls) |
| 2003–2004 | Bursa Merinosspor | | |
| 2004–2006 | İnegölspor | | |
| 2006–2010 | Antalyaspor | 113 | (1) |
| 2010–2015 | Gaziantepspor | 140 | (1) |
| 2015–2016 | Adana Demirspor | 24 | (0) |
| 2016–2018 | Gaziantepspor | 31 | (0) |
| 2018–2019 | Fatih Karagümrük | 12 | (0) |
| Total | | 320 | (2) |

Managerial career
- 2019–2020: Fatih Karagümrük (assistant)
- 2020–2021: Fatih Karagümrük
- 2021: Kasımpaşa
- 2022: Kasımpaşa
- 2024: Fatih Karagümrük
- 2025–: Sarıyer
- * Club domestic league appearances and goals

Şenol Can (Bulgarian: Шенол Джан; born 3 April 1983) is a Bulgarian-Turkish professional football coach and a former player who played as a left back. He is the head coach of TFF 1. Lig club Sarıyer.

== Playing career ==
Born in Bulgaria to a Turkish family, Can moved with his family at an early age in Bursa, Turkey. He started his football career in the local Bursa Merinosspor Academy, later moving to Bursaspor, before returning to Burca Merinosspor to make his professional debut. He spend his career playing in the Turkish league, spending most time in Antalyaspor and Gaziantepspor, before moving to Fatih Karagümrük.

== Coaching career ==
Can retired from football in 2019, becoming assistant manager in Fatih Karagümrük, the team he played last. In July 2020 he was promoted to manager of the team and secured his team first ever promote to Süper Lig. He left the team on 15 March 2021 by mutual agreement.

On 24 March 2021 he was announced as the new manager of Kasımpaşa, after Fuat Çapa release as manager.

== Managerial statistics ==
As of 11 November 2022

| Team | From | To | Record | | | | | | | |
| Team | From | To | G | W | D | L | Win % | GF | GA | GD |
|---|---|---|---|---|---|---|---|---|---|---|
| (Turkey) Fatih Karagümrük | 2 July 2020 | 15 March 2021 | 38 | 17 | 9 | 12 | 44.74 | 71 | 59 | +12 |
| (Turkey) Kasımpaşa | 24 March 2021 | 15 August 2021 | 11 | 4 | 4 | 3 | 36.36 | 15 | 18 | -3 |
| (Turkey) Kasımpaşa | 18 August 2022 | 11 November 2022 | 13 | 6 | 4 | 3 | 46.15 | 19 | 14 | +5 |
| Total | | | 62 | 27 | 17 | 18 | 43.55 | 105 | 91 | +14 |
