= Abdullah Elyasa Süme =

Turkish footballer and sporting director

Elyasa Süme
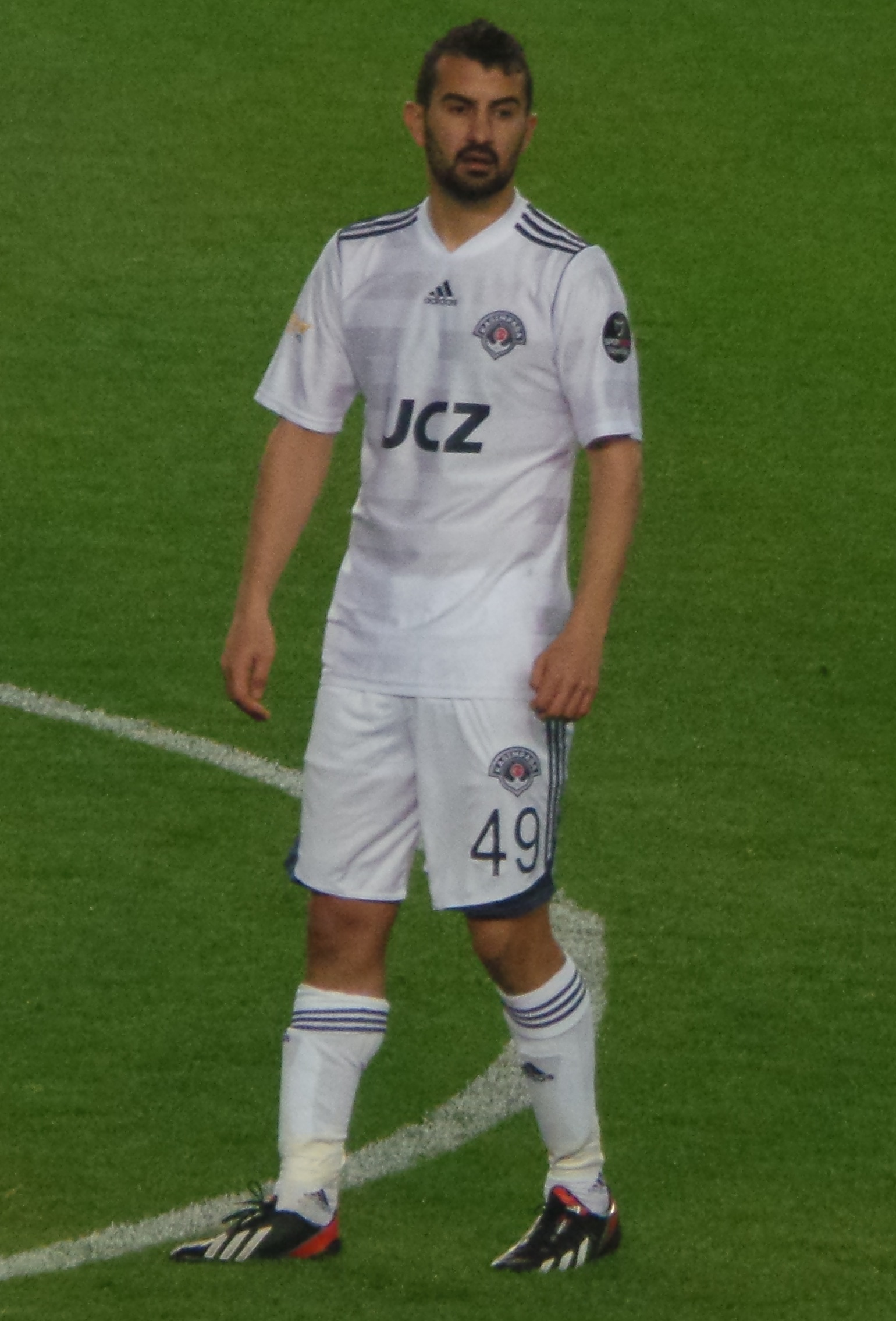

Personal information
- Full name: Abdullah Elyasa Süme
- Date of birth: 13 August 1983 (age 43)
- Place of birth: Wesel, Germany
- Height: 1.84 m (6 ft 0 in)
- Position: Right full back

Youth career
- KFC Uerdingen 05

Senior career*
Years	Team	Apps	(Gls)
2003–2004	KFC Uerdingen 05	26	(0)
2004–2006	Samsunspor	28	(0)
2006–2007	Diyarbakirspor	27	(2)
2007–2010	Ankaragücü	78	(4)
2010–2012	Gaziantepspor	55	(4)
2012–2014	Kasımpaşa	50	(0)
2014–2018	Gaziantepspor	95	(2)

International career
2004	Turkey U21	3	(0)

Managerial career
- 2018: Gaziantepspor (sporting director)
- * Club domestic league appearances and goals as of 3 June 2018

Abdullah Elyasa Süme (born 13 August 1983) is a Turkish retired footballer. He most recently worked as the sporting director of Gaziantepspor.
