= Feffernitz =

Coordinates: 46°41′N 13°42′E

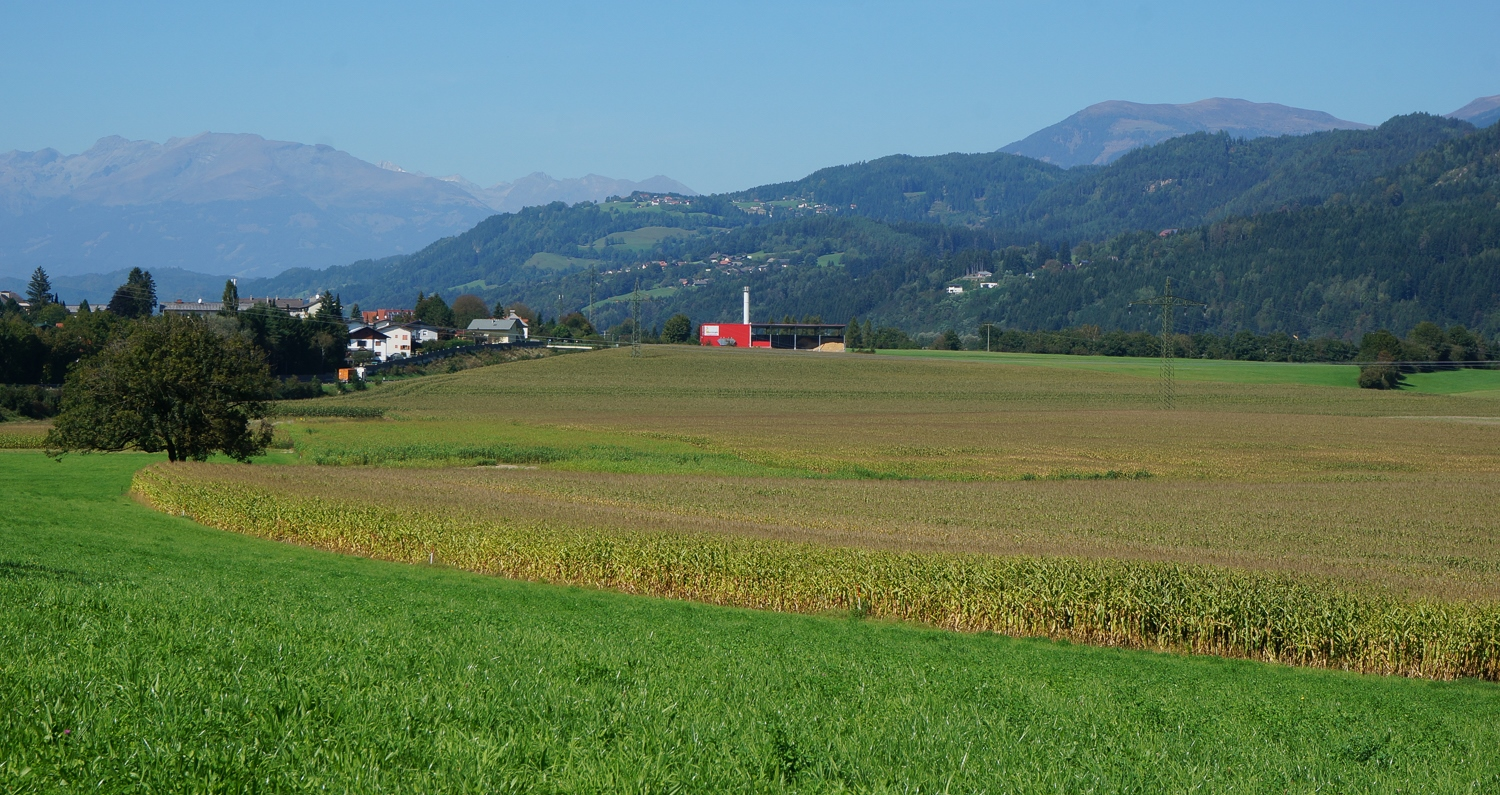
Feffernitz

Feffernitz is a sub-municipality of Paternion in the Villach-Land District of the Carinthia in Austria, the site of a post World War II British sector displaced person camp. The Feffernitz and Kellerberg camps housed some 10000 persons.
