= Jürgen Mössmer =

German footballer

Personal information
- Full name: Jürgen Mössmer
- Date of birth: 11 June 1989 (age 37)
- Place of birth: Reutlingen, West Germany
- Height: 1.81 m (5 ft 11 in)
- Positions: Defender; defensive midfielder

Team information
- Current team: TSG Young Boys Reutlingen
- Number: 99

Youth career
- 1994–2007: SSV Reutlingen 05

Senior career*
Years	Team	Apps	(Gls)
2007–2010	Eintracht Frankfurt II	59	(0)
2010–2014	VfR Aalen	69	(0)
2014–2016	1. FC Nürnberg	22	(0)
2017–	TSG Young Boys Reutlingen		
- * Club domestic league appearances and goals as of 16 May 2018

Jürgen Mössmer (born 11 June 1989) is a German footballer who plays as a defender and defensive midfielder .
