= Alexander Dercho =

German footballer

Personal information
- Full name: Alexander Dercho (born Alexander Krük)
- Date of birth: 21 January 1987 (age 39)
- Place of birth: Remscheid, West Germany
- Height: 1.86 m (6 ft 1 in)
- Position: Full-back

Youth career
- 1994–2001: SG Hackenberg
- 2001–2003: Fortuna Düsseldorf
- 2003–2006: Borussia Mönchengladbach

Senior career*
Years	Team	Apps	(Gls)
2006–2007	Borussia Mönchengladbach II	5	(0)
2007–2008	Kickers Emden	22	(0)
2008–2010	Eintracht Frankfurt	1	(0)
2008–2010	Eintracht Frankfurt II	8	(0)
2009–2010	→ VfL Osnabrück (loan)	31	(2)
2010–2011	VfL Osnabrück	19	(0)
2011–2012	Arminia Bielefeld	30	(1)
2012–2019	VfL Osnabrück	181	(3)
- * Club domestic league appearances and goals

Alexander Dercho (born 21 January 1987) is a retired German footballer. He was born Alexander Krük, before taking his wife's name in 2013.

== Retirement ==
In 2017, Dercho suffered from a cartilage injury and never fully recovered from that. At the end of the 2018–19 season, he decided to retire, having played only eight games in the season.
