= Ümit Korkmaz =

Austrian footballer (born 1985)

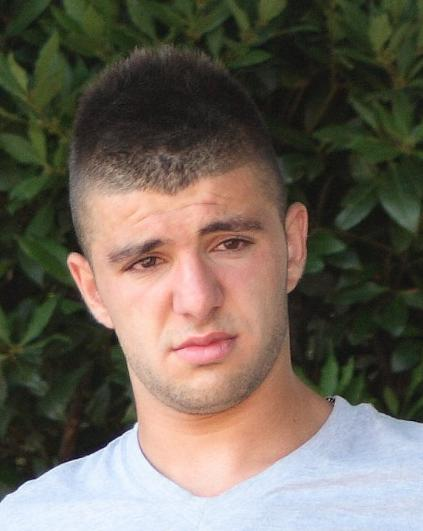
- Korkmaz in 2008

Personal information
- Date of birth: 17 September 1985 (age 41)
- Place of birth: Vienna, Austria
- Height: 1.75 m (5 ft 9 in)
- Position: Winger

Team information
- Current team: Ostbahn XI (Manager)

Youth career
- 1994–1996: Wacker Vienna
- 1996–2005: Slovan HAC

Senior career*
Years	Team	Apps	(Gls)
2005–2006	Rapid Wien II	26	(12)
2006–2008	Rapid Wien	55	(3)
2008–2012	Eintracht Frankfurt	48	(4)
2011	→ VfL Bochum (loan)	12	(3)
2012–2013	FC Ingolstadt 04	31	(2)
2014–2016	Çaykur Rizespor	37	(5)
2017	SKN St. Pölten	10	(0)
2017–2018	Mauerwerk	38	(5)
2019–2020	First Vienna	0	(0)
2020–2021	Slovan HAC	7	(0)
2022	SC Hainfeld		
2023–2024	Ostbahn XI	7	(1)

International career
2008–2011	Austria	10	(0)

Managerial career
- 2024–: Ostbahn XI
- * Club domestic league appearances and goals

Ümit Korkmaz (German pronunciation: [ˈyːmɪt ˈkɔʁkmats]; born 17 September 1985) is an Austrian retired footballer who played as a winger. He is currently the manager of Ostbahn XI.

Korkmaz has played for football clubs in Germany and Turkey, as well as Austria. He also represented the Austria national football team at UEFA Euro 2008.

== Club career ==
Korkmaz was signed by a fifth division club at the age of 18. He was soon discovered by scouts of Rapid Wien and transferred to the club. Brought through the ranks of Rapid Wien, Korkmaz played two seasons with the side.

In June 2008, Korkmaz agreed to join German Bundesliga side Eintracht Frankfurt. He signed a four-year contract that runs until 30 June 2012. In January 2011, Eintracht Frankfurt loaned Korkmaz, who had not had many chances to play for the club that season, to 2. Bundesliga club VfL Bochum.

On 12 December 2013, it was announced that he had annulled his contract with FC Ingolstadt 04 and would subsequently join Çaykur Rizespor.

Korkmaz signed with First Vienna on 20 December 2018.

== International career ==
He received his first call-up for Austria in summer 2007 but only made his debut prior to Euro 2008. He was also included in the 23-man squad for the tournament.

== Coaching career ==
Korkmaz transferred to Ostbahn XI in January 2023. He played seven games for the club in total, one of which was the only game he played in the 2023-24 season, while in the 2024-25 season he didn't play any games either until he was hired as manager of the club in November 2024.

== Personal life ==
Korkmaz is of Turkish descent. He also holds Turkish citizenship, which made him eligible to play internationally for the Turkey national team.

== Honours ==
Rapid Wien

- Austrian Football Bundesliga: 2007–08
