= Martin Fenin =

Czech footballer (born 1987)

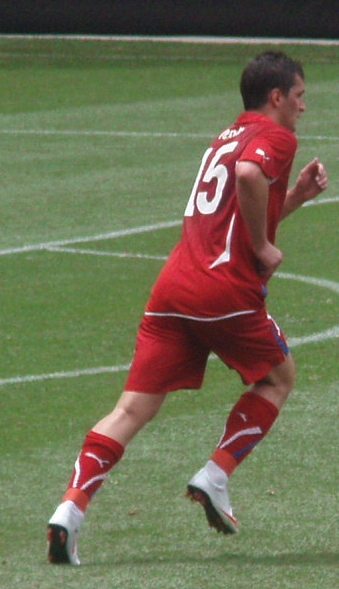
- Fenin playing for the Czech Republic in 2010

Personal information
- Full name: Martin Fenin
- Date of birth: 16 April 1987 (age 39)
- Place of birth: Cheb, Czechoslovakia
- Height: 1.81 m (5 ft 11 in)
- Position: Striker

Youth career
- 1993–2003: FK Teplice

Senior career*
Years	Team	Apps	(Gls)
2003–2007	FK Teplice	77	(15)
2008–2011	Eintracht Frankfurt	90	(14)
2011–2012	Energie Cottbus	14	(0)
2013	Slavia Prague	12	(0)
2014	FK Teplice	7	(1)
2014	Istres	8	(1)
2015–2016	Chemnitzer FC	2	(0)
2016–2017	Zbrojovka Brno U21	?	(?)
2017–2018	FK Varnsdorf	5	(1)

International career
2002–2003	Czech Republic U16	14	(3)
2003–2004	Czech Republic U17	15	(6)
2004–2006	Czech Republic U19	20	(6)
2006–2007	Czech Republic U20	12	(4)
2008	Czech Republic U21	1	(0)
2007–2011	Czech Republic	16	(3)

Managerial career
- 2017: 1. FC Magdeburg (scout)
- * Club domestic league appearances and goals

Martin Fenin (Czech pronunciation: [ˈmarcɪn ˈfɛɲɪn]; 16 April 1987) is a Czech former professional footballer who played as a striker. He has represented the Czech Republic national team and formerly played for the youth teams of the Czech Republic from the under-16 level.

== Club career ==
Fenin started playing professional football for FK Teplice. In 2007, he won the Talent of the Year award at the Czech Footballer of the Year awards. Following his performance at the 2007 FIFA U-20 World Cup in Canada, many large clubs expressed interest in him. Juventus was one of the teams in the scramble to sign the Czech forward from his home club. The deal looked to be sealed but Fenin had a change of heart after claiming he would not be happy as Juventus would loan him out to Udinese Calcio or Genoa CFC for a season. He then swiftly agreed to a deal with Eintracht Frankfurt worth €3.5 million, where he got to a good start, scoring a hat-trick in his first match. In the last day of transfer window 31 August 2011, he moved to Energie Cottbus.

Since the summer break in 2016, he has been in touch with the Czech First League team FC Zbrojovka Brno. He went through a three-month fitness programme. On 3 November 2016, he started his trial there, with the goal to incorporate into U-21 squad in the rest of the autumn and to gain a place in preparing with the first team in the winter break.

== International career ==
Fenin played for several different youth national teams of the Czech Republic having the most starts for the Czech Republic U19 national team. He scored three goals for the Czechs in the 2007 FIFA U-20 World Cup in Canada, including one in the final against Argentina. After the tournament he won 16th place in a poll for best under-21 player.

On 22 August 2007, Fenin made his international debut for senior national team against Austria. As of 2008, he was a part of the Czech national team and was nominated for the UEFA Euro 2008, but did not play in the tournament.

After a 2009 defeat against Slovakia in the qualification for the 2010 FIFA World Cup, coach Petr Rada was dismissed along with several players. These players (Fenin among them) were suspended indefinitely from the team by the Football Association of the Czech Republic for an alleged disciplinary breach. He returned to action for his country a year later, playing in the friendly match against Turkey on 22 May 2010.

== Personal life ==
In June 2021, Fenin spoke about mental health in football and his struggles with alcoholism. Fenin, working for the FIFPRO's mental health awareness programme said that "[He] always fled into alcohol when [he] encountered problems", and added that "talking was his biggest problem", advising players struggling with mental health to reach out to someone.

== Career statistics ==
Scores and results list the Czech Republic's goal tally first, score column indicates score after each Fenin goal.

List of international goals scored by Martin Fenin
No.	Date	Venue	Opponent	Score	Result	Competition
1	11 October 2008	Silesian Stadium, Chorzów, Poland	Poland	1–2	1–2	2010 FIFA World Cup qualification
2	25 May 2010	Rentschler Field, East Hartford, United States	United States	3–2	4–2	Friendly
3	11 August 2010	Stadion u Nisy, Liberec, Czech Republic	Latvia	2–0	4–1	Friendly

== Honours ==
Czech Republic U21

- FIFA U-20 World Cup runner-up: 2007
