= 2002–03 Eintracht Frankfurt season =

Eintracht Frankfurt
2002-03 season
- Chairman: Volker Sparmann
- Manager: Willi Reimann
- 2. Bundesliga: 3rd (promoted)
- DFB-Pokal: Second round
- Top goalscorer: League: Ervin Skela (10); All: Ervin Skela (11)
- Highest home attendance: 25,500 (25 May, vs SSV Reutlingen)
- Lowest home attendance: 10,000 (27 October, vs LR Ahlen)
- Average home league attendance: 15,765
Home colours	Away colours

The 2002–03 Eintracht Frankfurt season was the 103rd season in the club's football history. In 2002–03 the club played in the 2. Bundesliga, the second tier of German football. It was the club's 4th season in the 2. Bundesliga. The season ended for Eintracht with promotion to the Bundesliga after finishing 3rd in the 2. Bundesliga.

== Results ==
=== Friendlies ===
Win Draw Loss

10 July 2002	Rödermark XI	2–4	Eintracht Frankfurt	Rödermark, Germany
18:30 CEST	Fäth 35'; Grimm 88'	(Report)	Jones 3'; Guié-Mien 12'; Kryszałowicz 32'; Skela 71'	Stadium: Sportanlage Frankfurter Straße; Attendance: 900; Referee: Grieben

14 July 2002	VfB Aßlar	1–4	Eintracht Frankfurt	Haiger, Germany
15:00 CEST	Hassler 64'	(Report)	Weißenfeldt 4'; Kryszałowicz 71'; Streit 73'; Diakité 87'	Stadium: Stadion auf den Haarwasen; Attendance: 600; Referee: Deimann

17 July 2002	SV Erzhausen	0–2	Eintracht Frankfurt	Erzhausen, Germany
		(Report)	Guié-Mien 25'; Kryszałowicz 38'	Attendance: 500; Referee: Ballweg

20 July 2002	Racing Strasbourg	2–3	Eintracht Frankfurt	Haguenau, France
18:00 CEST	Ljuboja 9'; Bertin 46' (pen.)	(Report)	Guié-Mien 36' (pen.); Kryszałowicz 39'	Attendance: 3,000

24 July 2002	Westerburg / Willmenrod / Gemünden XI	0–22	Eintracht Frankfurt	Gemünden, Germany
19:00 CEST		(Report)	Hengemühle; Diakité; Skela; Toppmöller; Tsoumou-Madza; Cimen; Streit; Vivian	Stadium: Sportplatz Gemünden; Attendance: 1,500

28 July 2002	Rot-Weiß Walldorf	0–8	Eintracht Frankfurt
		(Report)	Tsoumou-Madza 5'; Montero 32'; Skela 48'; Guié-Mien 56'; Branco 62' (pen.); Diakité 70'; Hengemühle 85'; Toppmöller 87'	Attendance: 2,000

31 July 2002	Gießen XI	1–8	Eintracht Frankfurt	Fernwald, Germany
	Goal	(Report)	Jones; Hengemühle; Guié-Mien; Wiedener; Wenczel; Tsoumou-Madza	Attendance: 600

27 August 2002	FC Oberursel	2–2	Eintracht Frankfurt
18:30 CEST	Oteng-Mensa 33'; Sauer 42'	(Report)	Diakité 17'; Skela 74'	Attendance: 500; Referee: Stieler

22 October 2002	Usinger TSG	0–7	Eintracht Frankfurt	Usingen, Germany
		(Report)	Toppmöller; Streit; Skela	Attendance: 650

14 January 2003	CF Gandía	1–3	Eintracht Frankfurt	Oliva, Spain
16:00 CEST	Miguel 16' (pen.)	(Report)	Tsoumou-Madza 14'; Hengemühle 51'; Diakité 82' (pen.)	Attendance: 20

19 January 2003	SV Bernbach	0–7	Eintracht Frankfurt	Freigericht, Germany
14:30 CEST			Kryszałowicz 23', 41'; Beierle 32'; Tsoumou-Madza 38'; Speranza 46'; Toppmöller 67'; Hengemühle 76' (pen.)	Attendance: 2,000

2 February 2003	VfR 09 Meerholz / Gelnhausen XI	1–12	Eintracht Frankfurt	Gelnhausen, Germany
18:30 CEST	San José 17'	(Report)	Vivian 8', 49'; Toppmöller 20'; Hengemühle 31', 39', 51', 65'; Wenczel 41', 43'; Speranza 75'; Diakité 79'; Branco 82' (pen.)	Attendance: 500

29 March 2003	VfR Lich	1–6	Eintracht Frankfurt	Lich, Germany
	Schwarzer 36'	(Report)	Jones 20', 75'; Beierle 25'; Toppmöller 30', 45'; Hengemühle 78'	Attendance: 1,500

=== Indoor soccer tournaments ===
==== Nürnberg ====
6 January 2002 First match	Eintracht Frankfurt	1–2	VfB Stuttgart	Nuremberg, Germany
	Schur 3'	(Report)	Amanatidis 2', 6'	Stadium: Arena Nürnberg

6 January 2002 Second match	Eintracht Frankfurt	4–4	TSV München 1860	Nuremberg, Germany
	Kryszałowicz 9', 16'; Bürger 11'; Diakité 14'	(Report)	Wiesinger 6'; Borimirov 16'; Pürk 17'; Meyer 20'	Stadium: Arena Nürnberg

==== Bielefeld ====
8 January 2002 First match	Arminia Bielefeld	2–1	Eintracht Frankfurt	Bielefeld, Germany
	Wichniarek 16'; Cha 18'	(Report)	Kryszałowicz 1'	Stadium: Seidenstickerhalle

8 January 2002 Second match	VfL Osnabrück	3–4	Eintracht Frankfurt	Bielefeld, Germany
	Schütte 5', 14'; Menga 10'	(Report)	Diakité 3'; Kryszałowicz 13', 20'; Skela 20'	Stadium: Seidenstickerhalle

8 January 2002 Semi-final match	Werder Bremen	4–4 (4–3 p)	Eintracht Frankfurt	Bielefeld, Germany
	Mamoum 4'; Borowski 12', 17'; Klasnić 13'	(Report)	Kryszałowicz 1', 14'; Speranza 6'; Vivian 10'	Stadium: Seidenstickerhalle
	Penalties
	Klasnić (penalty scored); Borowski (penalty scored); Jovanović (penalty scored); Klasnić (penalty scored)		(penalty scored) Streit; (penalty scored) Montero; (penalty scored) Skela; (penalty missed) Streit

8 January 2002 3rd place playoff	VfL Osnabrück	3–5	Eintracht Frankfurt	Bielefeld, Germany
	Menga 6', 20'; Tammen 16'	(Report)	Skela 3'; Wenczel 7'; Speranza 15'; Bürger 18'; Montero 20'	Stadium: Seidenstickerhalle

=== Competitions ===
Win Draw Loss

==== 2. Bundesliga ====
===== League table =====
Pos	Team	Pld	W	D	L	GF	GA	GD	Pts	Promotion or relegation
1	SC Freiburg (C, P)	34	20	7	7	58	32	+26	67	Promotion to Bundesliga
2	1. FC Köln (P)	34	18	11	5	63	45	+18	65	Promotion to Bundesliga
3	Eintracht Frankfurt (P)	34	17	11	6	59	33	+26	62	Promotion to Bundesliga
4	Mainz 05	34	19	5	10	64	39	+25	62	
5	SpVgg Greuther Fürth	34	15	12	7	52	48	+4	57	

Source: Bundesliga.de
Rules for classification: 1) points; 2) goal difference; 3) number of goals scored.
(C) Champions; (P) Promoted

===== Results summary =====
Overall								Home						Away					
Pld	W	D	L	GF	GA	GD	Pts	W	D	L	GF	GA	GD	W	D	L	GF	GA	GD
34	17	11	6	59	33	+26	62	10	5	2	34	16	+18	7	6	4	25	17	+8

Source: Competitive matches

Round	1	2	3	4	5	6	7	8	9	10	11	12	13	14	15	16	17	18	19	20	21	22	23	24	25	26	27	28	29	30	31	32	33	34
Ground	H	A	H	A	H	A	H	A	H	H	A	H	A	H	A	H	A	A	H	A	H	A	H	A	H	H	A	H	A	H	A	H	A	H
Result	W	W	W	L	L	W	W	L	D	W	W	D	D	W	W	W	L	D	D	W	D	D	W	W	D	L	D	W	D	D	L	W	W	W
Position	1	1	2	3	6	3	3	5	6	2	2	3	3	2	2	2	2	2	2	3	3	4	3	2	3	3	4	3	4	3	5	4	3	3

Source: kicker.de
A = Away; H = Home; W = Win; D = Draw; L = Loss

===== Matches =====
11 August 2002 1	Eintracht Frankfurt	4–0	FC St. Pauli	Frankfurt
15:00 CEST	Stanislawski 22' (o.g.); Guié-Mien 83'; Skela 88'; Streit 89'	(Report)		Stadium: Waldstadion; Attendance: 20,000; Referee: Christian Wack

19 August 2002 2	SC Freiburg	0–2	Eintracht Frankfurt	Freiburg
20:15 CEST		(Report)	Keller 67'; Guié-Mien 90'	Stadium: Dreisamstadion; Attendance: 24,000; Referee: Jürgen Aust

23 August 2002 3	Eintracht Frankfurt	2–0	SpVgg Greuther Fürth	Frankfurt
19:00 CEST	Jones 26'; Guié-Mien 87'	(Report)		Stadium: Waldstadion; Attendance: 15,000; Referee: Walz

10 September 2002 4	1. FC Köln	3–2	Eintracht Frankfurt	Cologne
19:00 CEST	Lottner 13'; Keller 71' (o.g.); Scherz 75'	(Report)	Bindewald 45'; Kryszałowicz 49'	Stadium: RheinEnergieStadion; Attendance: 28,500; Referee: Florian Meyer

15 September 2002 5	Eintracht Frankfurt	0–2	Wacker Burghausen	Frankfurt
15:00 CEST		(Report)	Frühbeis 30'; Younga-Mouhani 68'; Younga-Mouhani (yellow card) 70' (yellow-red card)	Stadium: Waldstadion; Attendance: 13,500; Referee: Mathias Anklam

23 September 2002 6	Karlsruher SC	0–2	Eintracht Frankfurt	Karlsruhe
20:15 CEST		(Report)	Guié-Mien 44', 76'	Stadium: Wildparkstadion; Attendance: 12,000; Referee: Michael Weiner

29 September 2002 7	Eintracht Frankfurt	2–1	MSV Duisburg	Frankfurt
15:00 CEST	Guié-Mien 17'; Skela 90'	(Report)	Ebbers 24'	Stadium: Waldstadion; Attendance: 15,000; Referee: Herbert Fandel

6 October 2002 8	Alemannia Aachen	1–0	Eintracht Frankfurt	Aachen
15:00 CEST	Ivanović 42'	(Report)		Stadium: Tivoli; Attendance: 11,000; Referee: Hans Voss

18 October 2002 9	Eintracht Trier	2–2	Eintracht Frankfurt	Trier
19:00 CEST	Guié-Mien 8'; Tsoumou-Madza 76'; Streit (yellow card) 78' (yellow-red card)	(Report)	Braham 36'; Winkler 41'	Stadium: Moselstadion; Attendance: 11,000; Referee: Hellmut Krug

27 October 2002 10	Eintracht Frankfurt	4–1	LR Ahlen	Frankfurt
15:00 CEST	Tsoumou-Madza 12'; Guié-Mien 15'; Montero 25'; Branco 42'	(Report)	Bamba 31'	Stadium: Waldstadion; Attendance: 10,000; Referee: Peter Gagelmann

1 November 2002 11	VfB Lübeck	1–3	Eintracht Frankfurt	Lübeck
19:00 CEST	Bärwolf 70'	(Report)	Kryszałowicz 4'; Wiedener 16'; Guié-Mien 46'	Stadium: Stadion an der Lohmühle; Attendance: 10,500; Referee: Peter Sippel

8 November 2002 12	Eintracht Frankfurt	0–0	Eintracht Braunschweig	Frankfurt
19:00 CEST		(Report)		Stadium: Waldstadion; Attendance: 13,000; Referee: Markus Weber

15 November 2002 13	1. FC Union Berlin	1–1	Eintracht Frankfurt	Berlin
19:00 CEST	Kryszałowicz 45'	(Report)	Vidolov 52'; Sandmann (yellow card) 75' (yellow-red card)	Stadium: Stadion an der Alten Försterei; Attendance: 9,000; Referee: Frank

22 November 2002 14	Eintracht Frankfurt	1–0	Mainz 05	Frankfurt
19:00 CEST	Schur 18'	(Report)		Stadium: Waldstadion; Attendance: 24,000; Referee: Jürgen Jansen

29 November 2002 15	Waldhof Mannheim	0–1	Eintracht Frankfurt	Mannheim
19:00 CEST		(Report)	Montero 72'	Stadium: Carl-Benz-Stadion; Attendance: 10,000; Referee: Manuel Gräfe

8 December 2002 16	Eintracht Frankfurt	1–0	Rot-Weiß Oberhausen	Frankfurt
15:00 CEST	Skela 87'	(Report)		Stadium: Waldstadion; Attendance: 13,000; Referee: Mike Pickel

15 December 2002 17	SSV Reutlingen	1–0	Eintracht Frankfurt	Reutlingen
15:00 CEST	Ogungbure 67'	(Report)		Stadium: Stadion an der Kreuzeiche; Attendance: 7,000; Referee: Günter Perl

24 January 2003 18	FC St. Pauli	1–1	Eintracht Frankfurt	Hamburg
19:00 CEST	Skela 36'	(Report)	Gerber 90'	Stadium: Millerntor-Stadion; Attendance: 20,000; Referee: Michael Weiner

31 January 2003 19	Eintracht Frankfurt	1–1	SC Freiburg	Frankfurt
19:00 CEST	Skela 66'	(Report)	Coulibaly 79'	Stadium: Waldstadion; Attendance: 17,500; Referee: Hellmut Krug

9 February 2003 20	SpVgg Greuther Fürth	0–1	Eintracht Frankfurt	Fürth
15:00 CEST		(Report)	Toppmöller 87'; Bindewald (yellow card) 90' (yellow-red card)	Stadium: Playmobil-Stadion; Attendance: 7,000; Referee: Babak Rafati

17 February 2003 21	Eintracht Frankfurt	1–1	1. FC Köln	Frankfurt
20:15 CEST	Beierle 2'; Schur (yellow card) 70' (yellow-red card)	(Report)	Kioyo 58'	Stadium: Waldstadion; Attendance: 11,500; Referee: Markus Merk

23 February 2003 22	Wacker Burghausen	3–3	Eintracht Frankfurt	Burghausen
15:00 CEST	Örüm 10'; Tavčar 37'; Oslislo 54'	(Report)	Skela 33'; Tavčar 60' (o.g.); Montero 73'	Stadium: Wacker-Arena; Attendance: 6,000; Referee: Torsten Koop

28 February 2003 23	Eintracht Frankfurt	2–1	Karlsruher SC	Frankfurt
19:00 CEST	Diakité 16'; Beierle 45'	(Report)	Eggimann 58'	Stadium: Waldstadion; Attendance: 11,500; Referee: Wolfgang Stark

10 March 2003 24	MSV Duisburg	0–2	Eintracht Frankfurt	Duisburg
20:15 CEST		(Report)	Tsoumou-Madza 34'; Keller 53'	Stadium: Wedaustadion; Attendance: 8,500; Referee: Florian Meyer

16 March 2003 25	Eintracht Frankfurt	1–1	Alemannia Aachen	Frankfurt
15:00 CEST	Skela 30'	(Report)	Rosin 35'	Stadium: Waldstadion; Attendance: 18,000; Referee: Herbert Fandel

21 March 2003 26	Eintracht Frankfurt	2–3	Eintracht Trier	Frankfurt
19:00 CEST	Beierle 15'; Jones 71'	(Report)	Labak 24' (pen.); Peković 82'; Lösch 88'	Stadium: Waldstadion; Attendance: 15,500; Referee: Thorsten Kinhöfer

6 March 2003 27	LR Ahlen	1–1	Eintracht Frankfurt	Ahlen
15:00 CEST	Mikolajczak 54'	(Report)	Beierle 79'	Stadium: Wersestadion; Attendance: 7,500; Referee: Thomas Frank

13 April 2003 28	Eintracht Frankfurt	3–1	VfB Lübeck	Frankfurt
15:00 CEST	Jones 10'; Skela 57' (pen.); Beierle 66'	(Report)	Scharping 37'	Stadium: Waldstadion; Attendance: 14,500; Referee: Hermann Albrecht

20 April 2003 29	Eintracht Braunschweig	0–0	Eintracht Frankfurt	Braunschweig
15:00 CEST		(Report)	Jones (yellow card) 64' (yellow-red card)	Stadium: Stadion an der Hamburger Straße; Attendance: 15,000; Referee: Dirk Margenberg

25 April 2003 30	Eintracht Frankfurt	0–0	1. FC Union Berlin	Frankfurt
19:00 CEST		(Report)		Stadium: Waldstadion; Attendance: 15,000; Referee: Stephan Kammerer

5 May 2003 31	Mainz 05	3–2	Eintracht Frankfurt	Mainz
20:15 CEST	Babatz 37'; Beierle 67' (o.g.); Auer 89'	(Report)	Beierle 30'; Schur 74'	Stadium: Bruchwegstadion; Attendance: 18,500; Referee: Franz-Xaver Wack

9 May 2003 32	Eintracht Frankfurt	4–1	Waldhof Mannheim	Frankfurt
19:00 CEST	Jones 40', 90'; Keller 75'; Skela 82' (pen.)	(Report)	Kern 78'	Stadium: Waldstadion; Attendance: 15,500; Referee: Felix Brych

18 May 2003 33	Rot-Weiß Oberhausen	0–2	Eintracht Frankfurt	Oberhausen
15:00 CEST		(Report)	Toppmöller 11', 19'	Stadium: Niederrheinstadion; Attendance: 10,500; Referee: Peter Gagelmann

25 May 2003 34	Eintracht Frankfurt	6–3	SSV Reutlingen	Frankfurt, Germany
15:00 CEST	Jones 5'; Schur 23', 90'; Skela 38'; Diakité 83', 90'	(Report)	Frommer 6'; Gambo 53'; Würll 56'; Rehm (yellow card) 87' (yellow-red card)	Stadium: Waldstadion; Attendance: 25,500; Referee: Hartmut Strampe

==== DFB-Pokal ====
1 September 2002 1st Round	Rot-Weiß Erfurt	2–3 (a.e.t.)	Eintracht Frankfurt	Erfurt, Germany
15:00 CEST	Džihić 52'; Okić 85'	(Report)	Guié-Mien 17'; Jones 68'; Skela 118'	Stadium: Steigerwaldstadion; Attendance: 8,500; Referee: Weiner

5 November 2002 2nd Round	Hansa Rostock	1–0	Eintracht Frankfurt	Rostock, Germany
19:00 CEST	Meggle 90'	(Report)		Stadium: Ostseestadion; Attendance: 10,000; Referee: Scheppe

== Players ==
=== First-team squad ===
Squad at end of season

Note: Flags indicate national team as defined under FIFA eligibility rules; some limited exceptions apply. Players may hold more than one non-FIFA nationality.

No.	Pos.	Nation	Player
1	GK	MKD	Oka Nikolov (Note: Nikolov was born in Erbach im Odenwald, West Germany (now Germany), but also qualified to represent Macedonia (now North Macedonia) internationally and made his international debut for Macedonia in September 1998.)
2	DF	GER	Sven Günther
3	MF	GER	Henning Bürger
4	DF	GER	Andree Wiedener
5	DF	GER	Jens Keller
6	FW	GER	David Montero
7	MF	ALB	Ervin Skela
8	DF	GER	Michael Wenczel
9	FW	POL	Paweł Kryszałowicz
10	MF	GER	Dino Toppmöller
11	MF	GER	Jermaine Jones (Note: Jones was born in Frankfurt, West Germany (now Germany), and represented Germany at U-20, U-21 and B level before making his international debut for Germany in 2008, but also qualified to represent the United States internationally through his father and made his international debut for the United States in October 2010.)
12	DF	BRA	Matheus Vivian
13	DF	GER	Uwe Bindewald
14	FW	BRA	Franciel Hengemühle

No.	Pos.	Nation	Player
16	DF	CMR	Serge Branco
17	MF	GER	Daniyel Cimen
18	DF	GER	Baldo di Gregorio
19	MF	GER	Albert Streit (Note: Streit was born in Bucharest, Romania, but was raised in Germany and represented Germany at U-16, U-17, U-18 and B level.)
20	FW	GER	Markus Beierle
21	DF	GER	Lars Weißenfeldt
22	GK	GER	Sven Schmitt
23	DF	CGO	Jean-Clotaire Tsoumou-Madza
24	MF	GER	Alexander Schur
26	FW	GER	Bakary Diakité (Note: Diakité was born in Frankfurt, West Germany (now Germany), but also qualified to represent Mali internationally and made his international debut for Mali in 2008.)
27	MF	GER	Giovanni Speranza (Note: Speranza was born in Giessen, West Germany (now Germany), but also qualified to represent Italy internationally and represented Italy in futsal.)
29	DF	CRO	Vladimir Maljković
30	GK	GER	Andreas Menger

=== Left club during season ===
Note: Flags indicate national team as defined under FIFA eligibility rules; some limited exceptions apply. Players may hold more than one non-FIFA nationality.

No. / Pos. / Nation / Player; 15 / MF / CGO / Rolf-Christel Guié-Mien (to Freiburg)	No. / Pos. / Nation / Player; — / DF / GER / Christoph Preuß (on loan to Bayer Leverkusen)

=== Eintracht Frankfurt II ===
Note: Flags indicate national team as defined under FIFA eligibility rules; some limited exceptions apply. Players may hold more than one non-FIFA nationality.

No.	Pos.	Nation	Player
25	MF	SCG	Nikola Jovanovic
—	DF	CMR	Jean-Paul Ndeki

No.	Pos.	Nation	Player
—	MF	GER	Peter Deißenberger
—	MF	NGA	Stephen Famewo

=== Under-19s ===
Note: Flags indicate national team as defined under FIFA eligibility rules; some limited exceptions apply. Players may hold more than one non-FIFA nationality.

No.	Pos.	Nation	Player
—	GK	GER	Jan Zimmermann
—	DF	GER	Alexander Huber (Note: Huber was born in Leninabad, Tajik SSR, Soviet Union (now Khujand, Tajikistan), but was raised in Germany from the age of 4 and represented Germany at U-20 and B level before making his international debut for Tajikistan in June 2017.)

No.	Pos.	Nation	Player
—	DF	GER	Christopher Reinhard
—	DF	GER	Marco Russ

=== Under-17s ===
Note: Flags indicate national team as defined under FIFA eligibility rules; some limited exceptions apply. Players may hold more than one non-FIFA nationality.

No. / Pos. / Nation / Player; — / DF / GER / Mounir Chaftar	No. / Pos. / Nation / Player; — / MF / GER / Faton Toski (Note: Toski was born in Gjilan, SFR Yugoslavia (now Kosovo, but then part of Serbia and Montenegro), but was raised in Germany and represented Germany at U-19 level before making his international debut for Kosovo in March 2014.)

== Statistics ==
=== Appearances and goals ===
No.	Pos	Nat	Player	Total		2. Bundesliga		DFB-Pokal	
No.	Pos	Nat	Player	Apps	Goals	Apps	Goals	Apps	Goals
1	GK	(North Macedonia) MKD	Oka Nikolov	36	0	34	0	2	0
2	DF	(Germany) GER	Sven Günther	14	0	14	0	0	0
3	MF	(Germany) GER	Henning Bürger	34	0	32	0	2	0
4	DF	(Germany) GER	Andree Wiedener	25	1	23	1	2	0
5	DF	(Germany) GER	Jens Keller	35	3	33	3	2	0
6	MF	(Spain) ESP	David Montero	31	3	29	3	2	0
7	MF	(Albania) ALB	Ervin Skela	35	11	33	10	2	1
8	DF	(Germany) GER	Michael Wenczel	1	0	1	0	0	0
9	FW	(Poland) POL	Paweł Kryszałowicz	25	3	23	3	2	0
10	MF	(Germany) GER	Dino Toppmöller	16	3	16	3	0	0
11	FW	(Germany) GER	Jermaine Jones	18	7	17	6	1	1
12	DF	(Brazil) BRA	Matheus Vivian	2	0	2	0	0	0
13	DF	(Germany) GER	Uwe Bindewald	34	1	32	1	2	0
14	FW	(Brazil) BRA	Franciel Hengemühle	1	0	1	0	0	0
15	MF	(Republic of the Congo) CGO	~~Rolf-Christel Guié-Mien~~	18	10	16	9	2	1
16	MF	(Cameroon) CMR	Serge Branco	19	1	17	1	2	0
17	DF	(Germany) GER	Daniyel Cimen	4	0	4	0	0	0
19	MF	(Germany) GER	Albert Streit	34	1	32	1	2	0
20	FW	(Germany) GER	Markus Beierle	15	6	15	6	0	0
21	MF	(Germany) GER	Lars Weißenfeldt	10	0	10	0	0	0
23	DF	(Republic of the Congo) CGO	Jean-Clotaire Tsoumou-Madza	36	3	34	3	2	0
24	MF	(Germany) GER	Alexander Schur	33	4	31	4	2	0
26	MF	(Germany) GER	Bakary Diakité	16	3	16	3	0	0
30	GK	(Germany) GER	Andreas Menger	0	0	0	0	0	0

=== Transfers ===
==== Summer ====
In:

No.	Pos.	Nation	Player
2	DF	GER	Sven Günther (from FC Schweinfurt)
3	MF	GER	Henning Bürger (from FC St. Pauli)
5	DF	GER	Jens Keller (from 1.FC Köln)
6	MF	ESP	David Montero (from Waldhof Mannheim)
10	MF	GER	Dino Toppmöller (from VfL Bochum)
12	DF	BRA	Matheus Vivian (from Grêmio)
14	FW	BRA	Franciel Hengemühle (from Grêmio)
17	MF	GER	Daniyel Cimen (from Eintracht Frankfurt U19)
21	MF	GER	Lars Weißenfeldt (from Eintracht Frankfurt II)
23	DF	CGO	Jean-Clotaire Tsoumou-Madza (from OFC Neugersdorf)
26	MF	GER	Bakary Diakité (from De Graafschap)

Out:

No.	Pos.	Nation	Player
2	DF	AUT	Gerd Wimmer (to Hansa Rostock)
3	MF	GER	Marco Gebhardt (to Energie Cottbus)
5	DF	CZE	Karel Rada (to FK Teplice)
6	MF	GER	Jens Rasiejewski (to FC St. Pauli)
11	MF	SVK	Peter Németh (to Baník Ostrava)
12	DF	KOR	Sim Jae-Won (to Busan i.Cons)
14	FW	MKD	Saša Ćirić (to 1. FC Nürnberg)
18	MF	GER	Michael Mutzel (to VfB Stuttgart)
20	MF	GER	Christoph Preuß (to Bayer Leverkusen)
21	FW	CHN	Yang Chen (to FC St. Pauli)
22	FW	GER	Yılmaz Örtülü (to 1. FC Saarbrücken)
22	FW	GER	Ralf Schmitt (to Wormatia Worms)
23	MF	NGA	Stephen Famewo (to VfB Stuttgart)
25	MF	GER	Alexander Rosen (to 1. FC Saarbrücken)
26	MF	GER	Giuseppe Gemiti (to Udinese Calcio)
27	MF	GER	Giovanni Speranza (to Eintracht Frankfurt II)
32	GK	GER	Dirk Heinen (to Denizlispor)

==== Winter ====
In:

No.	Pos.	Nation	Player
20	FW	GER	Markus Beierle (from Hansa Rostock)

Out:

No.	Pos.	Nation	Player
15	MF	CGO	Rolf-Christel Guié-Mien (to SC Freiburg)

== Sources ==
- Matheja, Ulrich (2011). Unsere Eintracht - Eintracht Frankfurt - Die Chronik. Die Werkstatt. ISBN 978-3-89533-750-5.
