= 2006–07 Eintracht Frankfurt season =

Eintracht Frankfurt
2006–07 season
- Chairman: Heribert Bruchhagen
- Manager: Friedhelm Funkel
- Bundesliga: 14th
- DFB-Pokal: Semi-finals
- UEFA Cup: Group stage
- Top goalscorer: League: Naohiro Takahara (11); All: Naohiro Takahara (17)
- Highest home attendance: 51,500 (six occasions)

The 2006–07 Eintracht Frankfurt season was the 107th season in the club's football history. In 2006–07 the club played in the Bundesliga, the first tier of German football. It was the club's 102nd season in the first tier.

== Players ==
=== First-team squad ===
Squad at end of season

Note: Flags indicate national team as defined under FIFA eligibility rules; some limited exceptions apply. Players may hold more than one non-FIFA nationality.

No.	Pos.	Nation	Player
1	GK	MKD	Oka Nikolov (Note: Nikolov was born in Erbach im Odenwald, West Germany, but also qualified to represent Macedonia (now North Macedonia) internationally and made his international debut for Macedonia in September 1998.)
2	DF	GER	Patrick Ochs
4	DF	GER	Christoph Preuß
5	DF	MKD	Aleksandar Vasoski
6	MF	GER	Michael Fink
7	MF	GER	Benjamin Köhler
8	MF	GER	Albert Streit (Note: Streit was born in Bucharest, Romania, but was raised in Germany and represented Germany at U-16, U-17, U-18 and B level.)
9	MF	GER	Marcel Heller
10	MF	AUT	Markus Weissenberger
11	FW	GER	Michael Thurk
13	MF	GER	Jermaine Jones (Note: Jones was born in Frankfurt, West Germany, and represented Germany at U-20, U-21 and B level before making his international debut for Germany in 2008, but also qualified to represent the United States through his father and made his international debut for the United States in October 2010.)
14	MF	GER	Alexander Meier
16	DF	SUI	Christoph Spycher

No.	Pos.	Nation	Player
18	FW	GRE	Ioannis Amanatidis
19	FW	JPN	Naohiro Takahara
21	GK	GER	Markus Pröll
22	DF	GER	Christopher Reinhard
23	DF	GER	Marco Russ
27	DF	GER	Sotirios Kyrgiakos
28	GK	GER	Jan Zimmermann
29	DF	BRA	Chris
30	MF	SUI	Benjamin Huggel
31	DF	GER	Mounir Chaftar
32	MF	GER	Faton Toski (Note: Toski was born in Gjilan, SFR Yugoslavia (now Kosovo), but was raised in Germany and represented Germany at U-19 level before making his international debut for Kosovo in March 2014.)
33	DF	GER	Marko Rehmer

=== Left club during season ===
Note: Flags indicate national team as defined under FIFA eligibility rules; some limited exceptions apply. Players may hold more than one non-FIFA nationality.

No.	Pos.	Nation	Player
17	MF	GER	Daniyel Cimen (on loan to Eintracht Braunschweig)
20	FW	GER	Francisco Copado (to Hoffenheim)

No.	Pos.	Nation	Player
25	DF	GER	Alexander Huber (Note: Huber was born in Leninabad, Tajik SSR, Soviet Union (now Khujand, Tajikistan), but was raised in Germany from the age of 4 and represented Germany at U-20 and B level before making his international debut for Tajikistan in June 2017.) (to Eintracht Braunschweig)
26	FW	GER	Dominik Stroh-Engel (to SV Wehen)

=== Eintracht Frankfurt II ===
Note: Flags indicate national team as defined under FIFA eligibility rules; some limited exceptions apply. Players may hold more than one non-FIFA nationality.

No.	Pos.	Nation	Player
34	GK	GER	Pablo Álvarez
35	DF	GER	Nils Holzhauser
—	DF	GER	Timothy Chandler (Note: Chandler was born in Frankfurt, West Germany, but also qualified to represent the United States internationally through his father and made his international debut for the United States in March 2011.)
—	DF	GER	Sebastian Jung

No.	Pos.	Nation	Player
—	MF	GER	Marcel Titsch-Rivero
—	MF	GER	Richard Weil
—	MF	CRO	Krešo Ljubičić (Note: Ljubičić was born in Hanau, West Germany, but also qualified to represent Croatia internationally and represented Croatia at U-17, U-18, U-19, U-20 and U-21 level.)
—	FW	GER	Cenk Tosun (Note: Tosun was born in Wetzlar, Germany, and represented Germany at U-16, U-18, U-19 and U-21 level, but also qualified to represent Turkey internationally and represented Turkey at U-21 and B level before making his international debut for Turkey in October 2013.)

== Transfers 2006-07 ==
In:

Player	From	Fee
(Germany) Alexander Huber	TSG 1899 Hoffenheim	Was on loan
(Germany) Albert Streit	1. FC Köln	Free
(Germany) Michael Fink	Arminia Bielefeld	Free
(Japan) Naohiro Takahara	Hamburger SV	€750,000
(Germany) Faton Toski	Eintracht academy	Free
(Greece) Sotirios Kyrgiakos	Rangers	Free
(Germany) Michael Thurk	Mainz 05	€1.5M
(Germany) Marcel Heller	Sportfreunde Siegen	€40,000

Out:

Player	To	Fee
(Croatia) Jurica Puljiz	Široki Brijeg	Free
(Germany) Alexander Schur	Sportfreunde Seligenstadt	Free
(South Korea) Cha Du-ri	Mainz 05	Free
(Austria) Stefan Lexa	1. FC Kaiserslautern	Free
(Spain) Francisco Copado	1899 Hoffenheim	€300,000
(Germany) Daniyel Cimen	Eintracht Braunschweig	€200,000 (on loan)
(Germany) Alexander Huber	Eintracht Braunschweig	€100,000

== Results ==
Results for Eintracht Frankfurt for season 2006-2007.

NOTE: scores are written Eintracht first

Date	Venue	Opponents	Score	Competition	Eintracht scorers	Match Report
9 July 2006	Zell am Ziller	WSG Wattens	5-0	F	Weissenberger, Fink, Amanatidis, Copado, Meier	eintracht-archiv.de
14 July 2006	Sportplatz, Schwanheim	Germania Schwanheim	14-0	F	Copado (4), Ochs, Meier, Fink, Köhler, Gebriwit (o.g.) Weissenberger (2), Stroh-Engel (2), Preuß	eintracht-archiv.de
17 July 2006	Sportanlage Altkönigblick, Königstein	Maccabi Netanya	3-1	F	Stroh-Engel (2), Preuß	eintracht-archiv.de
20 July 2006	Carl-Benz-Stadion, Mannheim	Waldhof Mannheim	2-1	F	Stroh-Engel (2)	eintracht-archiv.de
23 July 2006	Auestadion, Kassel	KSV Hessen Kassel	3-2	F	Weissenberger, Rehmer, Köhler	eintracht-archiv.de
26 July 2006	Stadion an der Bremer Brücke, Osnabrück	VfL Osnabrück	3-1	F	Amanatidis, Meier, Copado	eintracht-archiv.de
30 July 2006	MSV Arena, Duisburg	MSV Duisburg	0-1	F		eintracht-archiv.de
2 August 2006	Stadion Süd am Hegelsberg, Griesheim	Viktoria Griesheim	3-0	F	Meier, Amanatidis, Stroh-Engel	eintracht-archiv.de
5 August 2006	Playmobil-Stadion, Fürth	Greuther Fürth	2-2	F	Meier, Streit	eintracht-archiv.de
8 August 2006	Sportplatz, Weilersberg	RSV Weyer	16-0	F	Thurk (4), Amanatidis (4), Meier, Cimen, Köhler (2), Preuß, Copado (pen), Toski, Stroh-Engel	eintracht-archiv.de
12 August 2006	Veltins-Arena, Gelsenkirchen	Schalke 04	1-1	BL	Amanatidis	ESPN
15 August 2006	Sportanlage Beckerwiese, Oberrad	Spvgg 05 Oberrad	3-0	F	Copado, Reinhard, Preuß	eintracht-archiv.de
19 August 2006	Commerzbank-Arena, Frankfurt	VfL Wolfsburg	0-0	BL		ESPN
22 August 2006	Kemmete-Stadion, Rommerz	SG Rommerz	11-1	F	Copado (3), Köhler (2), Preuß (2), Weissenberger, Ochs (2), Takahara	eintracht-archiv.de
27 August 2006	Stadion am Bruchweg, Mainz	Mainz 05	1-1	BL	Amanatidis	ESPN
9 September 2006	Leimbachstadion, Siegen	Sportfreunde Siegen	2-0	GC	Takahara, Streit	eintracht-archiv.de
14 September 2006	Commerzbank-Arena, Frankfurt	Brøndby	4-0	UC	Thurk (3, 2 pen), Köhler	ESPN
17 September 2006	Commerzbank-Arena, Frankfurt	Bayer Leverkusen	3-1	BL	Takahara, Thurk, Ochs	ESPN
23 September 2006	Gottlieb-Daimler-Stadion, Stuttgart	VfB Stuttgart	1-1	BL	Meier	ESPN
28 September 2006	Brøndby Stadium, Brøndby	Brøndby	2-2	UC	Vasoski (2)	ESPN
30 September 2006	Commerzbank-Arena, Frankfurt	Hamburger SV	2-2	BL	Meier, Amanatidis	ESPN
14 October 2006	AWD-Arena, Hanover	Hannover 96	1-1	BL	Meier	ESPN
19 October 2006	Commerzbank-Arena, Frankfurt	Palermo	1-2	UC	Streit	ESPN
22 October 2006	Commerzbank-Arena, Frankfurt	1. FC Nürnberg	2-2	BL	Amanatidis (pen), Streit	ESPN
25 October 2006	Georg-Melches-Stadion, Essen	Rot-Weiss Essen	2-1	GC	Weissenberger, Amanatidis	eintracht-archiv.de
28 October 2006	Allianz Arena, Munich	FC Bayern Munich	0-2	BL		ESPN
2 November 2006	Balaídos, Vigo	Celta Vigo	1-1	UC	Huber	ESPN
5 November 2006	Commerzbank-Arena, Frankfurt	Borussia Mönchengladbach	1-0	BL	Takahara	ESPN
8 November 2006	Stadion der Freundschaft, Cottbus	Energie Cottbus	1-0	BL	Takahara	ESPN
11 November 2006	Commerzbank-Arena, Frankfurt	Arminia Bielefeld	0-3	BL		ESPN
17 November 2006	Ruhrstadion, Bochum	VfL Bochum	3-4	BL	Streit (2), Amanatidis	ESPN
25 November 2006	Commerzbank-Arena, Frankfurt	Borussia Dortmund	1-1	BL	Kyrgiakos	ESPN
30 November 2006	Commerzbank-Arena, Frankfurt	Newcastle United	0-0	UC		ESPN
2 December 2006	Tivoli, Aachen	Alemannia Aachen	3-2	BL	Takahara (3)	ESPN
9 December 2006	Commerzbank-Arena, Frankfurt	Werder Bremen	2-6	BL	Russ, Kyrgiakos	ESPN
13 December 2006	Şükrü Saracoğlu Stadium, Istanbul	Fenerbahçe	2-2	UC	Takahara (2)	ESPN
16 December 2006	Olympiastadion, Berlin	Hertha BSC	0-1	BL		ESPN
19 December 2006	Commerzbank-Arena, Frankfurt	1. FC Köln	3-1 (AET)	GC	Meier, Takahara, Kyrgiakos	eintracht-archiv.de
3 January 2007	Ballsporthalle, Frankfurt	Kickers Offenbach	1-1	IT	Huggel	eintracht-archiv.de
3 January 2007	Ballsporthalle, Frankfurt	MSV Duisburg	3-1	IT	Köhler, Heller (2)	eintracht-archiv.de
3 January 2007	Ballsporthalle, Frankfurt	Alemannia Aachen	3-0	IT (semi-final match)	Grüter, Streit (2)	eintracht-archiv.de
3 January 2007	Ballsporthalle, Frankfurt	Kickers Offenbach	3-1	IT (final match)	Ochs, Neppe, Huggel	eintracht-archiv.de
9 January 2007	Albufeira	SC Freiburg	2-2	F	Heller, Amanatidis	eintracht-archiv.de
12 January 2007	Vale do Lobo	MSV Duisburg	0-0	F		eintracht-archiv.de
16 January 2007	Riederwaldstadion, Frankfurt	Wacker Burghausen	3-0	F	Streit, Takahara, Meier	eintracht-archiv.de
20 January 2007	Riederwaldstadion, Frankfurt	Young Boys	0-0	F		eintracht-archiv.de
27 January 2007	Commerzbank-Arena, Frankfurt	Schalke 04	1-3	BL	Takahara	ESPN
30 January 2007	Volkswagen Arena, Wolfsburg	VfL Wolfsburg	2-2	BL	Thurk, Meier	ESPN
3 February 2007	Commerzbank-Arena, Frankfurt	Mainz 05	0-0	BL		ESPN
10 February 2007	BayArena, Leverkusen	Bayer Leverkusen	2-2	BL	Kyrgiakos, Meier	ESPN
16 February 2007	Commerzbank-Arena, Frankfurt	VfB Stuttgart	0-4	BL		ESPN
24 February 2007	AOL Arena, Hamburg	Hamburger SV	1-3	BL	Takahara	ESPN
27 February 2007	Bieberer Berg, Offenbach am Main	Kickers Offenbach	3-0	GC	Fink, Takahara (2)	Eurosport
3 March 2007	Commerzbank-Arena, Frankfurt	Hannover 96	2-0	BL	Takahara, Thurk	ESPN
9 March 2007	Frankenstadion, Nuremberg	1. FC Nürnberg	2-2	BL	Kyrgiakos, Takahara	ESPN
17 March 2007	Commerzbank-Arena, Frankfurt	Bayern Munich	1-0	BL	Preuß	ESPN
31 March 2007	Borussia-Park, Mönchengladbach	Borussia Mönchengladbach	1-1	BL	Kyrgiakos	ESPN
7 April 2007	Commerzbank-Arena, Frankfurt	Energie Cottbus	1-3	BL	Meier	ESPN
14 April 2007	Stadion Alm, Bielefeld	Arminia Bielefeld	4-2	BL	Amanatidis (2, 1 pen), Vasoski, Heller	ESPN
17 April 2007	Frankenstadion, Nuremberg	1. FC Nürnberg	0-4	GC		Eurosport
21 April 2007	Commerzbank-Arena, Frankfurt	VfL Bochum	0-3	BL		ESPN
28 April 2007	Signal Iduna Park, Dortmund	Borussia Dortmund	0-2	BL		ESPN
5 May 2007	Commerzbank-Arena, Frankfurt	Alemannia Aachen	4-0	BL	Huggel, Vasoski, Takahara, Köhler	ESPN
12 May 2007	Weserstadion, Bremen	Werder Bremen	2-1	BL	Amanatidis, Naldo (o.g.)	ESPN
19 May 2007	Commerzbank-Arena, Frankfurt	Hertha BSC	1-2	BL	Streit	ESPN
22 May 2007	Schrenzerstadion, Butzbach	Butzbach XI	15-1	F	Streit (3) Russ, Preuß, Thurk (3), Toski), Heller (3), Fink (2), Neppe	eintracht-archiv.de
24 May 2007	Sportanlage Nord, Frankfurt	Viktoria Preußen	8-0	F	Thurk (3), Örtülü, Fink, Ochs, Nickel (og), Kühn	eintracht-archiv.de

Key:

- BL = Bundesliga
- GC = German Cup (DFB-Pokal)
- UC = UEFA Cup match
- F = Friendly match
- IT = Indoor tournament

== Sources ==
- Matheja, Ulrich (2011). Unsere Eintracht - Eintracht Frankfurt - Die Chronik. Die Werkstatt. ISBN 978-3-89533-750-5.
- Official English Eintracht website
- Eintracht-Archiv.de
- 2006–07 Eintracht Frankfurt season at Fussballdaten.de (in German)
