= Ervin Skela =

Albanian footballer (born 1976)

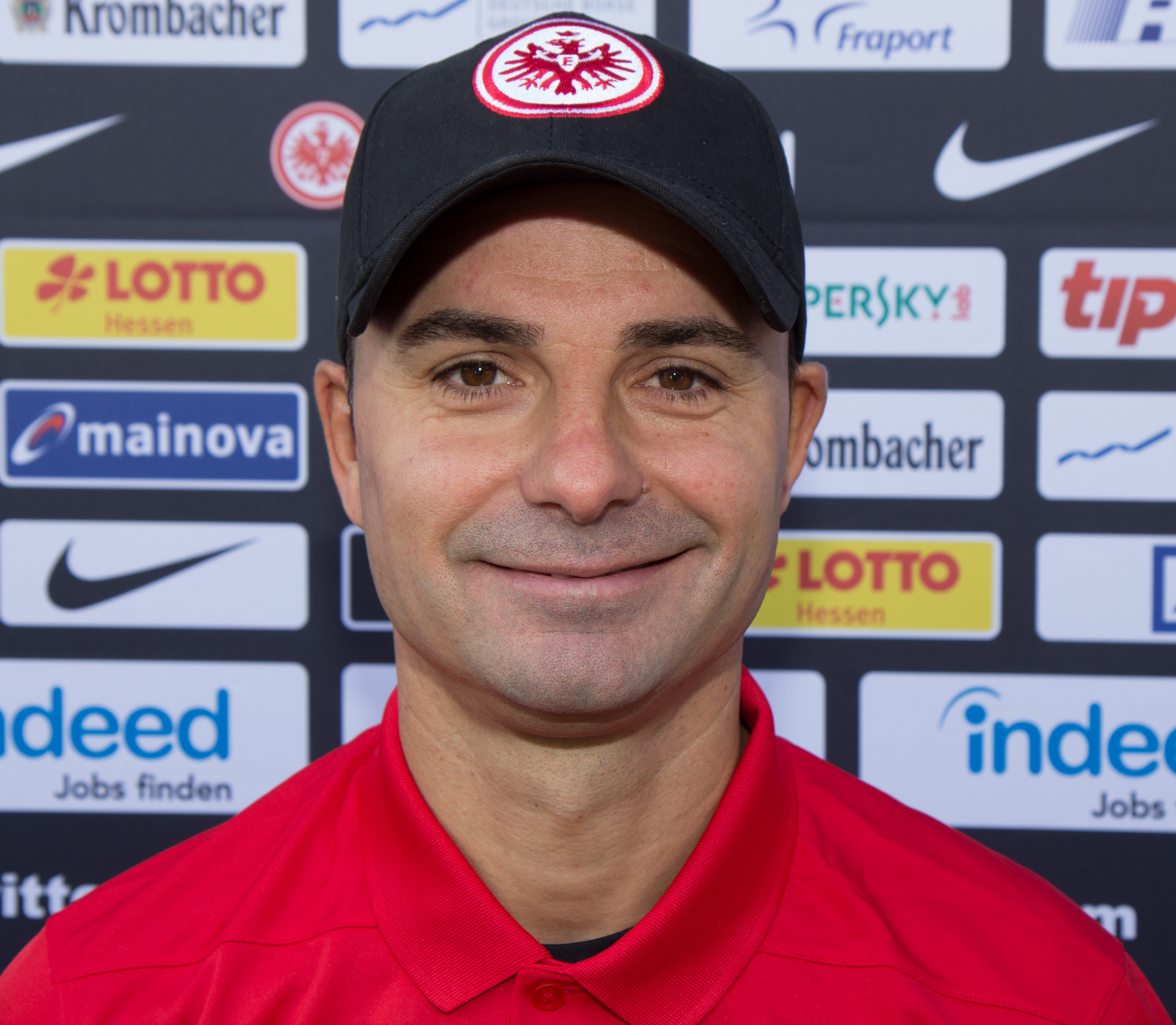
- Skela in 2018

Personal information
- Date of birth: 17 November 1976 (age 50)
- Place of birth: Vlorë, Albania
- Height: 1.73 m (5 ft 8 in)
- Position: Midfielder

Team information
- Current team: Lens (assistant)

Senior career*
| Years | Team | Apps | (Gls) |
| 1992–1995 | Flamurtari Vlorë | 32 | (4) |
| 1993 | → Tirana (loan) | 4 | (0) |
| 1995–1997 | Union Berlin | 57 | (9) |
| 1998–1999 | Erzgebirge Aue | 47 | (8) |
| 1999–2000 | Chemnitzer FC | 50 | (11) |
| 2001 | Waldhof Mannheim | 15 | (3) |
| 2001–2004 | Eintracht Frankfurt | 92 | (26) |
| 2004–2005 | Arminia Bielefeld | 32 | (0) |
| 2005–2006 | 1. FC Kaiserslautern | 34 | (4) |
| 2006 | Ascoli | 7 | (0) |
| 2007–2009 | Energie Cottbus | 72 | (9) |
| 2007 | Energie Cottbus II | 1 | (1) |
| 2009–2010 | TuS Koblenz | 18 | (0) |
| 2011 | TSV Germania Windeck | 0 | (0) |
| 2011 | Arka Gdynia | 5 | (0) |
| 2014–2019 | FC Hanau 93 | 69 | (44) |
| Total | | 535 | (121) |

International career
| 1993 | Albania U16 | 2 | (0) |
| 2000–2011 | Albania | 75 | (13) |

Managerial career
- 2016: Hessen Dreieich U15
- 2021–2022: Eintracht Frankfurt U17
- 2022–2023: Eintracht Frankfurt U19 (assistant)
- 2023: Eintracht Frankfurt U19
- 2026–: Lens (assistant)
- * Club domestic league appearances and goals

Ervin Skela (born 17 November 1976) is an Albanian former professional footballer who played as a midfielder and current assistant coach of French club Lens.

After beginning his career in Albania with Flamurtari Vlorë and Tirana, he moved to Germany in 1995, where he spent the bulk of his career and became known for his playmaking ability, set-piece technique and consistency. Skela featured extensively in both the Bundesliga and 2. Bundesliga, most notably with Eintracht Frankfurt, playing a key role in their 2002–03 promotion, and later with clubs including Arminia Bielefeld, 1. FC Kaiserslautern, and Energie Cottbus. He also had spells in Italy with Ascoli and in Poland with Arka Gdynia in 2011 when he announced initially retirement. After 3 years he came out of retirement playing amateur level with FC Hanau 93, retiring definitively at age of 43, after a career spanning more than two decades.

A key figure of the Albania national team throughout the 2000s, Skela earned 75 caps and scored 13 goals, making him one of Albania's most-capped players and among the national side's all-time leading scorers.

== Club career ==
=== Early career ===
Skela began playing football in his hometown of Vlorë, initially within the local sports school system, later joining the youth academy of Flamurtari Vlorë and gaining promotion at age 16 to the senior squad. He made his league debut during the 1992–93 Albanian championship and went on to register regular appearances in the top flight, playing 31 league matches and scoring 5 goals. In 1993, while still a teenager, he joined Tirana on a short loan spell, making 5 appearances before returning to Flamurtari later that season. Skela remained with Flamurtari until 1995, when he left Albania to pursue a professional career abroad.

=== Germany ===
In January 1995, Skela moved abroad to Germany and signed with 1. FC Union Berlin, then competing in the Regionalliga, the third tier of German football. During his three-year spell with the club, he made 57 league appearances and scored eight goals, helping Union Berlin achieve top-five finishes in the division.

In July 1997, Skela joined Erzgebirge Aue and made his debut on 23 July in the opening round of the 1997–98 Regionalliga season, a 1–1 draw against VFC Plauen. He earned a place in the starting lineup by the fifth matchday and held the position for the remainder of the campaign.

Skela scored his first goal for the club on 14 September in a 2–2 draw with Hansa Rostock II. The result lifted Aue into the upper half of the table. One week later, he registered a brace in a 4–1 away win over SV Babelsberg 03. Aue briefly climbed as high as fourth place before a late-season dip in form saw the team finish seventh.

Skela ended the season with 33 league appearances, nearly 2,800 minutes played, and six goals.

In the following season, the 1998–99 Regionalliga, Skela retained his place in the starting XI and was an ever-present through the first nine matchweeks as Aue maintained a mid-table position. His playing time decreased later in the campaign, and he made only five further league appearances, scoring once against Dynamo Dresden.

=== Chemnitzer FC ===
In 1999, Skela transferred to Chemnitzer FC, marking his first move to the 2. Bundesliga. He made his debut on 20 August 1999 in the second matchday of the 1999–2000 2. Bundesliga, entering as a substitute for the final 19 minutes in a match against Waldhof Mannheim. Over the next few matchdays, he established himself in the starting lineup.

Skela scored his first goal for Chemnitzer FC on 24 October 1999 in a 2–1 away win over Karlsruher SC during round nine of the campaign. He added further goals throughout the season and finished his first year at the club with 32 league appearances and eight goals. On 26 May 2000, in the decisive final match of the season against Tennis Borussia Berlin, Skela scored a crucial 14th-minute header that secured a 1–0 victory and guaranteed Chemnitzer FC's survival in the 2. Bundesliga after an 11th-place finish.

In the following season, the 2000–01 2. Bundesliga, Skela opened the campaign by scoring against Greuther Fürth, although Chemnitzer FC were defeated 4–1. During the first half of the season, he appeared in every league match, playing nearly all of the available minutes, contributing two goals and two assists. Chemnitzer FC, however, collected only nine points from their first 18 fixtures.

=== Waldhof Mannheim ===
In the January 2000 transfer window, Skela transferred to Waldhof Mannheim, remaining in the same division, the 2. Bundesliga, and joining a side who were contenders for promotion. He made his debut on 26 January 2001 against then–runners-up FC St. Pauli, playing the full 90 minutes in a 2–1 home win and receiving his fifth yellow card of the campaign, which led to a one-match suspension for the following fixture against 1. FC Nürnberg — the only match he missed for the entire season.

On 4 March 2001, he scored his first goal for Waldhof Mannheim in a 4–2 victory over Stuttgarter Kickers. Skela featured in all remaining matches of the season, frequently completing the full 90 minutes, and added two further goals in back-to-back fixtures in the final weeks of April 2001. Waldhof Mannheim finished the campaign in fourth place with 59 points, one behind rivals of FC St. Pauli, who secured the final promotion spot to the Bundesliga.

=== Eintracht Frankfurt ===
In Summer 2001, Skela transferred to Eintracht Frankfurt. He went on to spend three years with the club, making 92 appearances and scoring 26 goals.

He made his debut for Eintracht on 6 August 2001 against his former side Waldhof Mannheim, playing 75 minutes in an eventual goalless draw. He immediately established himself as a starter, and in the following week scored his first goal for the club in a 2–0 win over Schweinfurt 05. In the next two league fixtures he provided an assist in each match and being decisive scoring a brace in a 3–2 away victory against Karlsruher SC, a result that lifted Eintracht to first place in the standings. On 26 August he also scored the extra–time winner in a 1–0 DFB-Pokal victory over FC St. Pauli II to send Eintracht into the next round. Skela continued to contribute goals and assists throughout the campaign, finishing the season with 9 goals and 4 assists in 32 appearances as Eintracht Frankfurt ended the 2. Bundesliga season in seventh place.

Skela begun the new 2002–03 by initially appearing as a substitute. He scored on the 4–0 win against FC St. Pauli in the opening week of the championship. On 29 September 2002, Skela scored in the last minute for a 2–1 win over MSV Duisburg in his first league start of the season. Skela continued to deliver crucial goals throughout the campaign (often the only goals in narrow 1–0 or 1–1 results) and his contributions helped Eintracht remain often within the top three positions; eventually the club secured promotion to the Bundesliga on 25 May 2003 in the final matchday, after a 6–3 win, in which Skela played a pivotal role by scoring one goal and providing two assists, with Eintracht ranking third with 62 points, level with 1. FSV Mainz 05 but ahead on the head-to-head record. Skela ended the season with 11 goals in league and cup competitions, making him the team's top scorer.

Skela made his top–flight debut on 1 August 2003, scoring a historical goal in a 3–1 away defeat to Bayern Munich, becoming the first Albanian player to score against them. His goal, a long–range free-kick past goalkeeper Oliver Kahn was included in a Bundesliga compilation of top-10 goals scored in matches between the two clubs.

On 23 September 2003, Skela received a four–match suspension from the DFB Sports Court for "violent conduct following an unsporting action previously committed against him", after he was sent off for spitting at Thomas Riedl in the 6th matchday against 1. FC Kaiserslautern two days prior.

Throughout the 2003–04 Bundesliga season, he completed the full 90 minutes in every match he played, with the exception of only the final league match, in which he was substituted for the first time in the 76th minute. He also contributed with several goals and assists during a season in which Eintracht Frankfurt collected relatively few points; his second league goal of the campaign came on 29 November 2003 against VfL Wolfsburg, converting a penalty he had won himself in a 3–2 comeback victory after trailing 0–2. The following week, on 6 December 2003, he recorded both a goal and an assist against Hannover 96, scoring from another penalty in a 2–2 draw.

At the beginning of 2004, during the winter transfer window, Skela came close to a move to title contenders Bayer Leverkusen, where he had been offered a salary of €1.2 million per season, which would have been the highest of his career. However, the negotiations ultimately stalled, and Skela subsequently dismissed his agent over the failed transfer.

He began the year 2004 by scoring in the opening match of the second half of the season, netting from the penalty spot in a 1–1 draw against Bayern Munich on 31 January. On 13 March 2004, in the round 24, he recorded both a goal and an assist in a 3–0 win over sixth-placed Schalke 04, a result that temporary lifted Eintracht Frankfurt to 13th and further clear of the relegation zone. He repeated the same in round 30, again scoring and assisting in a 3–0 win, a result that kept Eintracht Frankfurt—then second-from-bottom—in direct competition with their rivals to avoid relegation.

In total, Skela recorded eight goals and seven assists in the league, finishing as Eintracht Frankfurt's top scorer for the second consecutive season. Despite his contributions, Eintracht were ultimately relegated after finishing third from bottom in the final standings.

=== Arminia Bielefeld ===
Skela joined Arminia Bielefeld for the 2004–05 season, becoming a regular starter throughout the campaign. He made 32 Bundesliga appearances, and a further five appearances and three goals in the DFB-Pokal. Although at the club for only one season, he left a lasting impression and was regarded as one of the most technically skilled players to have featured for the team.

He made his competitive debut for the club on 8 August 2004, playing the full 90 minutes in a goalless draw against Borussia Mönchengladbach in the opening match of the season.

On 4 December 2004, he provided the assist for Arminia's equalising goal in a 1–1 draw against Hansa Rostock. On 2 April 2005, in the 27th round of the season, he assisted the winning goal in the 1–0 victory over Bayer Leverkusen.

Arminia Bielefeld finished the Bundesliga season in 13th place with 40 points. In the DFB-Pokal, Skela scored a brace in the round of 16 during a 4–0 win over Karlsruher SC, as Arminia progressed until the semi-finals before being eliminated 2–0 by Bayern Munich.

=== Kaiserslautern ===
In the summer of 2005 he moved to 1. FC Kaiserslautern. He made his debut on 7 August 2005 in the opening round against Schalke 04, providing an assist in a 2–1 defeat. He scored his first goal for the club two weeks later, netting a last-minute winner in a 3–2 victory against 1. FC Köln.

Skela went on to appear in all 34 league matches of the campaign, scoring four goals, but was considered to have fallen short of expectations as Kaiserslautern were relegated at the end of the season, and Skela was subsequently released from his contract with the club, and subsequently joined Italian side Ascoli on a free transfer in 2006.

=== Ascoli ===
Skela signed a one–year contract with Italian side Ascoli ahead of the 2006–07 Serie A season and made his debut on 9 September 2006. He did not establish himself in the starting lineup and had his contract mutually terminated in early January 2007. During his short spell with the club, he made seven appearances in all competitions without scoring.

=== Energie Cottbus ===
During the January 2007 transfer window, Skela returned to Germany and signed a one-and-a-half-year contract with Energie Cottbus on 29 January 2007. He made his debut on 10 March 2007, coming on for the final eleven minutes in a 2–0 loss to Alemannia Aachen. From April until the end of the campaign, he made six additional league appearances, four of them as a starter. In addition, Skela also made one outing for Energie Cottbus II on 17 March 2007, scoring a goal in a 2–1 win over VfB Germania Halberstadt in an Oberliga NOFV-Süd fixture.

His first goal for the club came on 19 August 2007 in a 2–1 home defeat to VfL Bochum on matchday two. In his first full season with the club, the 2007–08 Bundesliga campaign, he established himself as an undisputed starter, appearing in all 34 league matches, playing almost every minute and contributing seven goals along with six assists. In late March and early April, Skela produced one of his most decisive runs of form by scoring all the decisive goals in three consecutive victories—a brace in the 2–1 win over Hertha BSC, followed by the only goals in each of 1–0 wins against MSV Duisburg and his former club Arminia Bielefeld—a sequence that lifted Energie Cottbus out of the relegation zone for the first time that season. He became one of the team's key players and a fan favourite, playing an important role in their successful battle to avoid relegation.

In the 2008–09 season he retained his starting role for Energie Cottbus, featuring in the majority of the fixtures across both the Bundesliga and the DFB-Pokal, contributing 2 league goals and several assists, mostly in matches from which the team earned points. In the 2008–09 DFB-Pokal, Skela scored a brace in the second-round match against Borussia Mönchengladbach on 23 September 2008, securing a 3–0 home victory that advanced Energie Cottbus to the Round of 16. On 22 November 2008, Skela scored for the third time in his career against Bayern Munich, in a match valid for the 14th week of the 2008–09 season, finished with a 4–1 loss at Allianz Arena. In late January, Skela scored a free-kick goal against Bayer Leverkusen in the DFB-Pokal, and was nominated for prestigious "Goal of the Month" award. On 27 February 2009, Skela signed a two–year contract extension with Energie Cottbus, valid until 2011; however, the deal included a clause allowing its termination in the event that the club were relegated to the 2. Bundesliga. On 11 April 2009, in Round 27 of the 2008–09 Bundesliga, Skela provided an assist in Energie Cottbus’ 2–1 home win against Arminia Bielefeld. He scored his second goal of the season against the eventual champions VfL Wolfsburg on 26 April 2009 and his team took a 2–0 victory, to become the first team to concede a defeat to VfL Wolfsburg after 4 months. In the final match of the Bundesliga, Skela provided all three assists in Energie Cottbus’ 3–0 home win against Bayer Leverkusen. Despite the victory, Energie Cottbus finished the season in the third-from-bottom position, a placement that made the team go for the relegation play-off.

In the ensuing relegation play-off, Skela played both matches in full against 1. FC Nürnberg, as Energie Cottbus were defeated 5–0 on aggregate, resulting in their relegation to the 2. Bundesliga; Skela subsequently left the club due to the contract clause allowing termination in such circumstances, ending his two-year spell with Energie Cottbus, during which he played 77 matches and scored 12 goals.

=== Koblenz ===
After four months without a club, on 14 October 2009 Skela signed a two-year contract with TuS Koblenz in 2. Bundesliga, taking the number 28. He made his debut in week 9 of the 2009–10 season against Rot Weiss Ahlen, playing the full 90 minutes in a 1–1 home draw. After the match, coach Uwe Rapolder expressed frustration with the team's overall performance, stating that “Skela alone cannot decide the matches” and calling for more from players such as Shefki Kuqi, Matej Mavrič, Benjamin Lense and Melinho. Skela went on to make 17 further league appearances for Koblenz, who finished the season in 17th place and were relegated from the league.

=== 2011: Germania Windeck and Arka Gdynia ===
After having been without a club since summer 2010, Skela signed with TSV Germania Windeck on 31 January 2011. His period with the club lasted only four weeks, without registering a single competitive appearance, and in March he became a free agent again.

Skela then signed with Arka Gdynia. He made his debut in the Ekstraklasa on 11 March 2011, coming on in the final minutes of a 2–2 away draw against Górnik Zabrze. His spell with the Polish side proved short-lived, as he left the club in June 2011. In total, he made five appearances for Arka Gdynia, three of them as a starter.

=== FC Hanau 93 ===
Having announced his retirement on 7 June 2013, and after not playing professional football since 2011, Skela came out of retirement, and on 29 January 2014, at the age of 37, signed with FC Hanau 93, a club competing in the German eighth-tier Kreisoberliga. The move was facilitated through personal connections, as he had a friendship with assistant coach Daniyel Cimen, while the club's sporting director stated that Skela was in good physical condition and interested in continuing to play at an amateur level.

During the second half of the 2013–14 season, Skela featured regularly for the club and contributed several important performances. By April 2014, he had scored three goals, all from the penalty spot. He also scored in local cup in a 4–1 Hanau derby win against 1860 Hanau in April 2014. In total he played 9 matches scoring 5 goals.

During the 2014–15 season, Skela played 26 league matches and scored 18 goals, finishing as the team's second-highest scorer behind Kahraman Damar (40 goals), as Hanau won the champions title and earned promotion to the Gruppenliga Frankfurt–Ost (VII). He also scored twice in four local cup matches, including the decisive goal in a 1–0 win that took Hanau into the Kreispokal quarter-finals on 22 February 2015.

On 16 January 2016, Hanau announced via their official Facebook page that Skela had extended his contract with the club for another season. In the 2015–16 season, he played 11 league matches, scoring twice.

In the 2016–17 season, Skela scored 19 goals in 18 league appearances, playing a total of 1,528 minutes. Hanau earned promotion to the Verbandsliga Hessen-Süd (VI).

In the 2017–18 season, Skela was used less frequently due to his commitment to obtaining the UEFA Pro Licence, making eight league appearances and scoring two goals. Hanau finished in third place in the league.

On 28 April 2018, he signed a one-year contract extension with the club.

In the 2018–19 season Skela made only two league appearances, first on 18 August 2018 against SV Eintracht Altwiedermus and on 27 April 2019 in a 4–3 win over Usinger TSG, which were his final matches before retirement.

In 2019, Skela left Hanau 93 after approximately six seasons, and a farewell ceremony was held before a Hessenliga (fifth tier) match, marking his contribution to the team's rise from the eighth tier to the Hessenliga during his spell as a player.

== International career ==
Skela represented the Albania under-16 team in the 1993 UEFA European Under-16 Championship qualifying.

Skela was first included in the Albania senior team in early 2000 and was part of the squad that won the 2000 Malta Rothmans Tournament, although he did not appear in any match. He went on to play a total of 75 matches and score 13 goals.

He also holds a unique record for the most appearances by an Albanian international in the FIFA World Cup qualification along Lorik Cana with 28 in overall.

He made his senior debut on 15 August 2000 in a 0–0 friendly draw against Cyprus, where he played in last 11 minutes.

He made his first competitive appearance one month later, coming on as a half-time substitute in the opening 2002 FIFA World Cup qualification match against Finland, which Albania lost 2–1. In his third consecutive appearance, one month later, Skela was named in the starting lineup for the following qualification match against Greece, which Albania won 2–0.

He scored his first goal on 25 April 2001 in a 2–0 away victory against Turkey at the Kamil Ocak Stadium in Gaziantep.

During 2001, Skela made several further substitute appearances in the qualifying campaign, featuring in the second half of each match.

During 2002, he was included in Albania's squad lists by coach Sulejman Demollari on several occasions for friendly matches in preparatory for the UEFA Euro 2004 qualifying campaign. but did not make any on-field appearances that year. Skela was not used even in the opening matches of the Euro 2004 qualifying by coach Giuseppe Dossena.

=== 2003–2005: Rise to prominence and qualifying achievements ===
Under new head coach Hans-Peter Briegel, Skela started both of Albania's next qualifying matches in spring 2003: the 3–1 home win against Russia, in which he provided an assist, and the 0–0 draw with the Republic of Ireland. Briegel stated at the time that he was trying to build a hardworking, combative national side, relying on a core group consisting Skela among experienced players.

Skela established himself in the starting lineup, and in the following qualifying matches in June 2003, Skela played the full 90 minutes in both games and scored once in each; Albania were defeated in both away fixtures, 2–1 by the Republic of Ireland and 3–2 by Switzerland. Albania eventually finished second from bottom in their UEFA Euro 2004 qualifying group.

On 20 August 2003, Skela scored again in a 3–1 away friendly defeat to Macedonia, marking his third consecutive match with a goal. He then went on to score at least one goal also in the next 7 years up to 2010, settling another national team records for most consecutive years of scoring.

On 18 February 2004, Skela scored the equaliser in Albania's 2–1 home win against Sweden, coming after a strong second-half comeback; he also had a penalty saved in added time.

During the 2006 FIFA World Cup qualification campaign, Skela was almost ever-present throughout the Group's 12 matches, being substituted off for only 39 minutes in total. The campaign began with a notable 2–1 home victory over reigning European champions Greece on 4 September 2004, a result regarded as one of Albania's most significant competitive wins. The match was followed by a serious incident in Greece, where an Albanian immigrant was killed during post-match celebrations. Despite the promising start, Albania soon faced a demanding schedule against high-calibre opponents such as Ukraine, Denmark and Turkey, suffering five defeats with identical 2–0 scorelines.

On 4 June 2005, Skela scored against Georgia, helping Albania secure a 3–2 victory in a match where the team produced one of its most convincing performances of the campaign, leading 3–0 by the 56th minute. The team achieved historic milestones, finishing third from bottom in the group for the first time and setting a new record points collected in total with 13.

=== 2006–2010: Euro and World Cup qualifiers – goals contributions, captaincy and team records ===
In the UEFA Euro 2008 qualifying, Skela began the campaign on 2 September 2006 by scoring from the penalty spot in a 2–2 away draw against Belarus. On 6 June 2007, he scored again in a 3–0 away victory over Luxembourg. During this period Albania secured a historic run of five consecutive matches without conceding a goal.

After the middle of the qualifying campaign, captain Igli Tare was excluded from the squad by coach Otto Barić, and Skela served as an occasional captain alongside Altin Lala. He wore the armband for the first time on 13 October 2007, leading Albania in a 0–0 home draw against Slovenia. Four days later, he missed a late penalty in a 1–1 home draw against Bulgaria, squandering a potential match-winning chance for Albania.

In the penultimate match of the group in November 2007, Skela provided both assists in a 4–2 loss to Belarus.

For the second consecutive qualifying cycle, Albania finished the group in fifth place in the seven-team standings.

Skela began the 2010 FIFA World Cup qualification campaign in September 2008, appearing in two consecutive clean sheet results, a goalless draw against Sweden and a 3–0 win over Malta, in which he provided an assist; after these first round fixtures, Albania was ranked first in the group standings.

In the following month, he played the entire match in a 0–0 away draw against Portugal, a result achieved despite Albania being reduced to ten men after Admir Teli's was sent off in an incident involving Cristiano Ronaldo.

On 19 November 2008, he scored a goal in a 1–1 draw against Azerbaijan.

In the remainder of the qualifying campaign, Skela served as captain, as Altin Lala was sidelined with several injury problems, including a herniated disc and a torn muscle fiber, all sustained in late 2008. As the campaign progressed into 2009, Albania struggled to score, registering several goalless matches, including a 0–0 draw away to Malta, a 1–0 defeat to Hungary and a 3–0 loss against Denmark. The sequence of poor results increased public and media criticism of head coach Arie Haan and his 4–5–1 formation, which was widely viewed as limiting the team's attacking output, and he was eventually dismissed from his position.

After Josip Kuže was appointed head coach, Skela said the squad had adapted well, and that the tactical approach had shifted to a more attacking style. Albania ended a run of scoreless matches in the subsequent fixture against Portugal, with Skela providing the assist for the team's goal in a 2–1 defeat.

On 12 August 2009, Skela scored twice from penalties in a 6–1 friendly win over Cyprus.

In the final match of the campaign, on 17 October 2009 against Sweden, Skela provided the assist for Albania's goal in a 4–1 defeat. Albania finished fifth in the group, above only Malta.

In the post-qualification period, Skela continued as captain in Lala's absence, and appeared in nearly all friendlies in late 2009 and 2010, also scoring on 3 March the winning goal against Northern Ireland; for the second time in history, and within only three years, Albania registered five consecutive matches without conceding, with Skela's presence in both sequences.

During the early stages of the UEFA Euro 2012 qualifying, Skela featured in Albania's first three matches, as the team produced a positive start that included 1–1 draws against both group contenders Romania and Bosnia and Herzegovina, remaining unbeaten in this opening phase, extendeding its run to eight consecutive matches without defeat, equalling the national record previously set in 1999–2000.

=== Later years and retirement ===
At the beginning of 2011, Altin Lala returned from the injury and resumed the captaincy, with Skela continuing to appear regularly during the Euro qualifying.

His final international appearance came on 6 September 2011 in the 2–1 away defeat to Luxembourg, during a period in which Skela served mostly as captain under the Croatian coach. At the time of his last international cap in late 2011, his 75 appearances ranked him third in the all-time list of Albania caps, where the top-10 at that point was largely composed of players from the 1990s, 2000s and 2010s generation with whom Skela had shared most of his international career.

On 7 June 2013, a few minutes before the start of the 2014 FIFA World Cup qualifying match against Norway at Qemal Stafa Stadium, he and his longtime international teammate Altin Lala were honored by Albanian Football Association for their contributions to the national team, receiving a 'plaque of appreciation' by the president Armando Duka.

== Coaching career ==
In January 2016, Skela took charge of the U15 team at Hessen Dreieich.

In May 2021, Eintracht Frankfurt announced that Skela would become the new head coach of their U17 squad for the 2021–22 season.

In May 2022 he was appointed as the assistant coach of the under-19 team, which will compete in the 2022–23 UEFA Youth League season. In late January 2023, after the previous U19 head coach was released, Skela became interim head coach of Eintracht Frankfurt U19.

On 7 July 2026, Skela was appointed first assistant coach of French Ligue 1 club Lens, winners of the 2025–26 Coupe de France on a two-year contract under head coach Dino Toppmöller, marking the first senior professional coaching role of his career; the pair previously were teammates together at Eintracht Frankfurt.

== Playing style ==
Skela usually operated as a central or attacking midfielder, noted for his versatility in both build-up play and set-pieces. He regularly took free kicks, corners and long-range shots for the national team and his clubs, contributing both goals and assists across his career. He was described as a tireless runner across the entire pitch, highlighting his work rate and all-action contributor.

== Personal life ==
Skela has one son, Chris (born 2007), who is also a footballer. Chris is a youth player of Kickers Offenbach U19 during the 2025–26 season.

== Career statistics ==
=== Club ===
Appearances and goals by club, season and competition
| Club | Season | League | | | Cup | | Play-offs | | Total | |
| Club | Season | Division | Apps | Goals | Apps | Goals | Apps | Goals | Apps | Goals |
|---|---|---|---|---|---|---|---|---|---|---|
| Flamurtari Vlorë | 1992–93 | Albanian National Championship | 20 | 2 | — | | — | | 20 | 2 |
| Flamurtari Vlorë | 1994–95 | Albanian National Championship | 12 | 2 | — | | — | | 12 | 2 |
| Flamurtari Vlorë | Total | | 32 | 4 | — | | — | | 32 | 4 |
| Tirana (loan) | 1993–94 | Albanian National Championship | 4 | 0 | — | | — | | 4 | 0 |
| 1. FC Union Berlin | 1994–95 | Regionalliga | 11 | 1 | — | | — | | 11 | 1 |
| 1. FC Union Berlin | 1995–96 | Regionalliga | 18 | 3 | — | | — | | 18 | 3 |
| 1. FC Union Berlin | 1996–97 | Regionalliga | 28 | 4 | — | | — | | 28 | 4 |
| 1. FC Union Berlin | Total | | 57 | 8 | — | | — | | 57 | 8 |
| Erzgebirge Aue | 1997–98 | Regionalliga | 33 | 6 | — | | — | | 33 | 6 |
| Erzgebirge Aue | 1998–99 | Regionalliga | 14 | 1 | — | | — | | 14 | 1 |
| Erzgebirge Aue | Total | | 47 | 7 | — | | — | | 47 | 7 |
| Chemnitzer FC | 1999–2000 | 2. Bundesliga | 32 | 8 | 3 | 1 | — | | 35 | 9 |
| Chemnitzer FC | 2000–01 | 2. Bundesliga | 18 | 3 | 1 | 1 | — | | 19 | 4 |
| Chemnitzer FC | Total | | 50 | 11 | 4 | 2 | — | | 54 | 13 |
| Waldhof Mannheim | 2000–01 | 2. Bundesliga | 15 | 3 | — | | — | | 15 | 3 |
| Eintracht Frankfurt | 2001–02 | 2. Bundesliga | 29 | 8 | 3 | 1 | — | | 32 | 9 |
| Eintracht Frankfurt | 2002–03 | 2. Bundesliga | 33 | 10 | 2 | 1 | — | | 35 | 13 |
| Eintracht Frankfurt | 2003–04 | Bundesliga | 30 | 8 | 2 | 0 | — | | 32 | 8 |
| Eintracht Frankfurt | Total | | 92 | 26 | 7 | 2 | — | | 99 | 28 |
| Arminia Bielefeld | 2004–05 | Bundesliga | 32 | 0 | 5 | 3 | — | | 37 | 3 |
| 1. FC Kaiserslautern | 2005–06 | Bundesliga | 34 | 4 | 3 | 0 | — | | 37 | 4 |
| Ascoli | 2006–07 | Serie A | 7 | 0 | — | | — | | 7 | 0 |
| Energie Cottbus | 2006–07 | Bundesliga | 7 | 0 | — | | — | | 7 | 0 |
| Energie Cottbus | 2007–08 | Bundesliga | 34 | 7 | — | | — | | 34 | 7 |
| Energie Cottbus | 2008–09 | Bundesliga | 31 | 2 | 3 | 3 | 2 | 0 | 36 | 5 |
| Energie Cottbus | Total | | 72 | 9 | 3 | 3 | 2 | 0 | 77 | 12 |
| Energie Cottbus II | 2007–08 | Oberliga NOFV-Süd | 1 | 1 | — | | — | | 1 | 1 |
| TuS Koblenz | 2009–10 | Bundesliga | 18 | 0 | 1 | 0 | — | | 19 | 0 |
| TSV Germania Windeck | 2010–11 | NRW-Liga | — | | — | | — | | — | |
| Arka Gdynia | 2010–11 | Ekstraklasa | 5 | 0 | — | | — | | 5 | 0 |
| Hanau 93 | 2013–14 | Kreisoberliga | 6 | 4 | 3 | 1 | — | | 9 | 5 |
| Hanau 93 | 2014–15 | Kreisoberliga | 26 | 18 | 4 | 2 | — | | 30 | 20 |
| Hanau 93 | 2015–16 | Gruppenliga | 11 | 2 | — | | — | | 11 | 2 |
| Hanau 93 | 2016–17 | Gruppenliga | 19 | 19 | — | | — | | 19 | 19 |
| Hanau 93 | 2017–18 | Verbandsliga | 8 | 2 | — | | — | | 8 | 2 |
| Hanau 93 | 2018–19 | Verbandsliga | 2 | 0 | — | | — | | 2 | 0 |
| Hanau 93 | Total | | 72 | 45 | 7 | 3 | — | | 79 | 48 |
| Career total | | | 538 | 118 | 30 | 13 | 2 | 0 | 568 | 131 |

=== International ===
Appearances and goals by national team and year
| National team | Year | Apps | Goals |
|---|---|---|---|
| Albania | 2000 | 4 | 0 |
| Albania | 2001 | 5 | 1 |
| Albania | 2002 | 0 | 0 |
| Albania | 2003 | 9 | 3 |
| Albania | 2004 | 8 | 1 |
| Albania | 2005 | 10 | 1 |
| Albania | 2006 | 6 | 2 |
| Albania | 2007 | 7 | 1 |
| Albania | 2008 | 7 | 1 |
| Albania | 2009 | 8 | 2 |
| Albania | 2010 | 7 | 1 |
| Albania | 2011 | 4 | 0 |
| Total | | 75 | 13 |

Scores and results list Albania's goal tally first, score column indicates score after each Skela goal.

List of international goals scored by Ervin Skela
| No. | Date | Venue | Opponent | Score | Result | Competition |
|---|---|---|---|---|---|---|
| 1 | 25 April 2001 | Gaziantep Kamil Ocak Stadium, Gaziantep, Turkey | Turkey | 2–0 | 2–0 | Friendly match |
| 2 | 7 June 2003 | Lansdowne Road, Dublin, Republic of Ireland | Republic of Ireland | 1–1 | 1–2 | UEFA Euro 2004 qualifying |
| 3 | 11 June 2003 | Stade de Genève, Geneva, Switzerland | Switzerland | 2–3 | 2–3 | UEFA Euro 2004 qualifying |
| 4 | 20 August 2003 | Stadion Goce Delčev, Prilep, Macedonia | Macedonia | 1–2 | 1–3 | Friendly match |
| 5 | 18 February 2004 | Qemal Stafa Stadium, Tirana, Albania | Sweden | 1–1 | 2–1 | Friendly match |
| 6 | 4 June 2005 | Qemal Stafa Stadium, Tirana, Albania | Georgia | 3–1 | 3–2 | 2006 FIFA World Cup qualification |
| 7 | 16 August 2006 | Stadio Olimpico, Serravalle, San Marino | San Marino | 2–0 | 3–0 | Friendly match |
| 8 | 16 August 2006 | Dinamo Stadium, Minsk, Belarus | Belarus | 1–2 | 2–2 | UEFA Euro 2008 qualifying |
| 9 | 6 June 2007 | Stade Josy Barthel, Luxembourg, Luxembourg | Luxembourg | 1–0 | 3–0 | UEFA Euro 2008 qualifying |
| 10 | 19 November 2008 | Tofiq Bahramov Stadium, Baku, Azerbaijan | Azerbaijan | 1–1 | 1–1 | Friendly match |
| 11 | 12 August 2009 | Qemal Stafa Stadium, Tirana, Albania | Cyprus | 1–0 | 6–1 | Friendly match |
| 12 | 12 August 2009 | Qemal Stafa Stadium, Tirana, Albania | Cyprus | 2–1 | 6–1 | Friendly match |
| 13 | 3 March 2010 | Qemal Stafa Stadium, Tirana, Albania | Northern Ireland | 1–0 | 1–0 | Friendly match |

== Honours ==
Hanau 93

- Kreisoberliga: 2014–15

Individual

- Albaniasoccer Footballer of the Year: 2007
- Albania national Footballer of the Year: 2008
