= David Montero =

David Montero may refer to:

- David Montero (footballer, born 1974)
- David Montero (footballer, born 1985)
