= Baldo di Gregorio =

German footballer (born 1984)

Personal information
- Full name: Baldassare di Gregorio
- Date of birth: 22 January 1984 (age 42)
- Place of birth: Offenbach am Main, West Germany
- Height: 1.80 m (5 ft 11 in)
- Position: Defender

Youth career
- –1999: Kickers Offenbach
- 1999–2002: Eintracht Frankfurt

Senior career*
Years	Team	Apps	(Gls)
2002–2004	Eintracht Frankfurt	0	(0)
2004	1. FC Schweinfurt 05		
2005	Hammer SpVg		
2005	Slavia Sofia	5	(0)
2006	1. FC Eschborn	15	(0)
2006–2010	Rot Weiss Ahlen	116	(7)
2010–2011	Arminia Bielefeld	21	(2)
2011–2012	Gostaresh Foulad		
2012–2013	Eintracht Trier	15	(0)
2013–2014	Eintracht Frankfurt II	22	(0)
2014–2015	NFC Orlandina		
2015–2016	Germania Schwanheim		
2016–2017	Spvgg 05 Oberrad		

International career
- Germany U19

Managerial career
- 2015–2016: Germania Schwanheim (player-manager)
- * Club domestic league appearances and goals

Baldassare "Baldo" di Gregorio (born 22 January 1984) is a German football coach and former player. He also holds Italian citizenship.

Di Gregorio was born in Offenbach am Main. A promising player in his youth, he was featured in Don Balón's 2001 list of the 100 most promising young players in the world at number 19, one place ahead of Andrés Iniesta.
