= Franciel =

Brazilian footballer (born 1982)

Personal information
- Full name: Franciel Rodrigo Hengemühle
- Date of birth: 17 February 1982 (age 44)
- Place of birth: Santo Cristo, Brazil
- Height: 1.89 m (6 ft 2 in)
- Position: Forward

Team information
- Current team: Mogi Mirim

Senior career*
Years	Team	Apps	(Gls)
2002	Grêmio		
2002–2003	Eintracht Frankfurt	1	(0)
2002–2003	→ Eintracht Frankfurt II	10	(3)
2004	1. FC Eschborn	10	(1)
2004–2005	Schaffhausen	28	(4)
2005	Debreceni VSC	1	(0)
2006	Brasil de Pelotas	0	(0)
2006	Ulbra	0	(0)
2006	Brasil de Pelotas	0	(0)
2007	São José (PA)	0	(0)
2007–2009	Gela	54	(27)
2009–2010	Valle del Giovenco	7	(0)
2010–2011	Gela	27	(3)
2011	L'Aquila	5	(0)
2012	São José (PA)	0	(0)
2012	Mogi Mirim		
- * Club domestic league appearances and goals as of end of 2010–11 season

Franciel Rodrigo Hengemühle, widely known as Franciel (born 17 February 1982) is a Brazilian footballer.

== Career ==
Franciel started his career at Grêmio, one of the biggest clubs from Rio Grande do Sul state, where he was born. In July 2002, along with Matheus Coradini Vivian, he was signed by Eintracht Frankfurt. He played once for the first team before he left for 1. FC Eschborn and later for Swiss Super League club Schaffhausen.

In the 2005–06 season, he left for Debreceni. But in January 2006, Franciel returned to Brazil for Brasil de Pelotas, a team from Rio Grande do Sul state, for the state league. On 1 May 2006, he was signed by Sport Club Ulbra in a one-year deal. However, he was released on 1 August 2006 due to a court order. He re-joined Brasil de Pelotas on 5 September 2006 and joined São José de Porto Alegre in January 2007.

In September 2007, Franciel returned to Europe for Italian fourth division side Gela.

After stints with now defunct club Valle del Giovenco and a return to Gela, Franciel signed with L'Aquila in January 2011.

In about January 2012, Franciel returned to Brazil again, for São José of Porto Alegre city. He scored four goals in first half of the state league (Taça Piratini). He was released in April. In May, he was signed by Mogi Mirim in a one-year deal. The team was one of the representative for the São Paulo state in 2012 Campeonato Brasileiro Série D, a final stage for the state (regional) leagues.
