= SV Mehring =

German football club

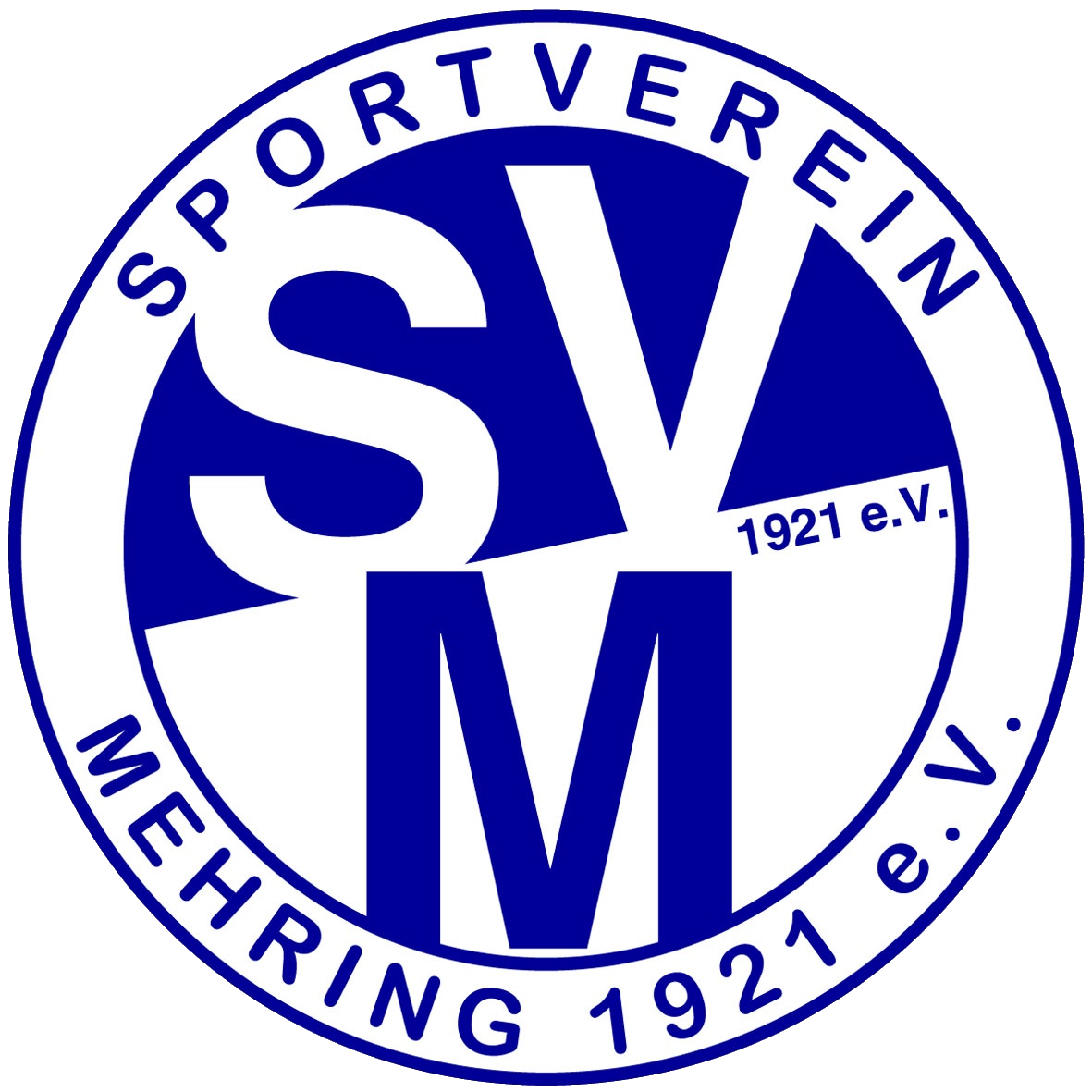
- Full name: Sportverein Mehring 1921 e.V.
- Founded: 13 December 1921
- Ground: Auf der Lay
- Capacity: 2,500
- Chairman: Günter Schlag
- Manager: Frank Meeth
- League: Rheinlandliga (VI)
- 2015–16: Oberliga Rheinland-Pfalz/Saar (V), 17th (relegated)
Home colours	Away colours

SV Mehring is a German association football club from the municipality of Mehring, Rhineland-Palatinate. The club's greatest success has been promotion to the tier five Oberliga Rheinland-Pfalz/Saar in 2012 and 2015.

== History ==
SV Mehring was formed on 13 December 1921 and played, for the most part of its history as a local amateur side.

Mehring won promotion to the highest league in the Rhineland, the Rheinlandliga for the first time in 2008. It played at this level for the next four seasons, gradually improving. In 2007–08 the club finished on equal points with Sportfreunde Eisbachtal on first place in the league, won the necessary decider 1–0 and earned promotion to the tier five Oberliga Rheinland-Pfalz/Saar for the first time. It played in the Oberliga for two seasons before being relegated again in 2014. A runners-up finish in the Rheinlandliga in 2014–15 and success in the promotion round took the club back up to the Oberliga for 2015–16. Finishing 17th in the Oberliga in 2015–16 Mehring was relegated back to the Rheinlandliga once more.

== Honours ==
The club's honours:

- Rheinlandliga
  - Champions: 2012
  - Runners-up: 2011, 2015
- Bezirksliga West
  - Champions: 2008
  - Runners-up: 2005, 2007
- Kreisliga A Trier-Saarburg
  - Champions: 2004

== Recent seasons ==
The recent season-by-season performance of the club:

Season	Division	Tier	Position
2003–04	Kreisliga A Trier-Saarburg	VII	1st ↑
2004–05	Bezirksliga West	VI	2nd
2005–06	Bezirksliga West	VI	3rd
2006–07	Bezirksliga West	VI	2nd
2007–08	Bezirksliga West	VI	1st ↑
2008–09	Rheinlandliga	VI	8th
2009–10	Rheinlandliga	VI	7th
2010–11	Rheinlandliga	VI	2nd
2011–12	Rheinlandliga	VI	1st ↑
2012–13	Oberliga Rheinland-Pfalz/Saar	V	13th
2013–14	Oberliga Rheinland-Pfalz/Saar	V	16th ↓
2014–15	Rheinlandliga	VI	2nd ↑
2015–16	Oberliga Rheinland-Pfalz/Saar	V	17th ↓
2016–17	Rheinlandliga	VI	

- With the introduction of the Regionalligas in 1994 and the 3. Liga in 2008 as the new third tier, below the 2. Bundesliga, all leagues below dropped one tier.

↑ Promoted	↓ Relegated
