= Jean-Clotaire Tsoumou-Madza =

Congo footballer

Personal information
- Date of birth: 31 January 1975 (age 51)
- Place of birth: Brazzaville, Congo
- Height: 1.85 m (6 ft 1 in)
- Position: Defender

Senior career*
Years	Team	Apps	(Gls)
1993–1995	Inter Brazzaville		
1996–1997	Concordia Ihrhove		
1997–1998	VfL Herzlake	23	(0)
1998–1999	SV Meppen	30	(6)
1999–2001	FC St. Pauli	26	(1)
2001–2002	FC Oberlausitz Neugersdorf		
2002–2004	Eintracht Frankfurt	42	(3)
2004–2005	Selangor MPPJ FC		
2006	LR Ahlen	14	(0)
2006–2007	SV Südwest Ludwigshafen		

International career
2002	Congo	1	(0)
- * Club domestic league appearances and goals

Jean-Clotaire Tsoumou-Madza (born 31 January 1975) is a Congolese former professional footballer who played as a defender. He spent one season in the Bundesliga with Eintracht Frankfurt and made one appearance for the Congo national team.
