= Sven Günther =

German footballer (born 1974)

Personal information
- Date of birth: 22 February 1974 (age 52)
- Place of birth: Zwickau, East Germany
- Height: 1.82 m (6 ft 0 in)
- Positions: Midfielder; defender

Youth career
- TSG Kirchberg

Senior career*
Years	Team	Apps	(Gls)
–1994	TSG Kirchberg		
1994–1998	FSV Zwickau	103	(6)
1998–2001	1. FC Nürnberg	64	(1)
2002	1. FC Schweinfurt 05	6	(0)
2002–2004	Eintracht Frankfurt	39	(0)
2004–2006	FC Erzgebirge Aue	45	(2)
2006–2008	FC Carl Zeiss Jena	33	(2)
2008–2010	FSV Zwickau	14	(1)

Managerial career
- 2010–2013: VfL Hohenstein
- * Club domestic league appearances and goals

Sven Günther (born 22 February 1974) is a German former football player. He spent three seasons in the Bundesliga with 1. FC Nürnberg and Eintracht Frankfurt.
