= Melinho =

Brazilian footballer (born 1980)

Personal information
- Full name: Rogério Pereira Tarciso
- Date of birth: 26 March 1980 (age 46)
- Place of birth: Santa Bárbara, Brazil
- Height: 1.87 m (6 ft 2 in)
- Position: Midfielder

Senior career*
Years	Team	Apps	(Gls)
1997–1998	União Barbarense		
1998	Villarreal		
1999–2000	Guarani		
2000–2001	União Barbarense		
2002–2003	Akratitos	17	(1)
2004	Portuguesa		
2004	Opava	13	(2)
2005	União Barbarense		
2005–2010	Sigma Olomouc	87	(14)
2009–2010	→ TuS Koblenz (loan)	12	(0)
2010–2012	DAC Dunajská Streda	6	(1)
2012–2013	União Barbarense		
2013	Rio Branco		
2013–2014	Oeste	2	(0)
2014	Capivariano	18	(2)
2014	São Caetano	4	(0)
2015–2017	Uniao Barbarense	32	(10)
- * Club domestic league appearances and goals

Melinho (born 26 March 1980) is a Brazilian former professional footballer who played as a midfielder.

== Career ==
Melinho previously played for Guarani in the Copa do Brasil. He also played for Akratitos in the Super League Greece. On 9 July 2009, he moved from SK Sigma Olomouc on loan to TuS Koblenz.
