= Dino Toppmöller =

German football manager (born 1980)

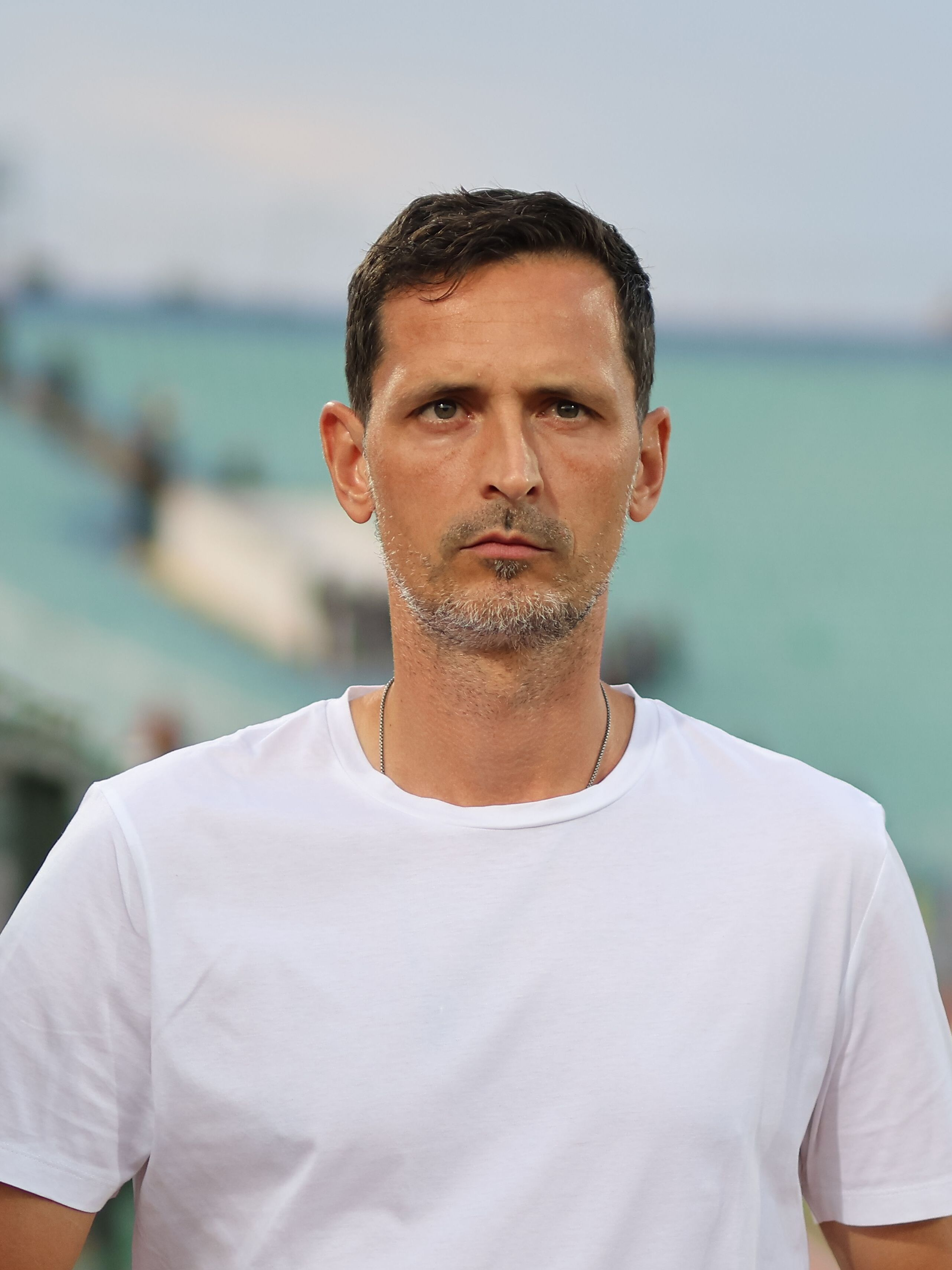
- Toppmöller in 2023

Personal information
- Full name: Dino Nicolas Toppmöller
- Date of birth: 23 November 1980 (age 45)
- Place of birth: Wadern, West Germany
- Height: 1.90 m (6 ft 3 in)
- Position: Attacking midfielder

Youth career
- –1997: SV Rivenich

Senior career*
Years	Team	Apps	(Gls)
1997–1999	FSV Salmrohr		
1999–2000	1. FC Saarbrücken	12	(1)
2001	Manchester City	0	(0)
2001–2002	VfL Bochum	12	(1)
2001–2002	→ VfL Bochum II	2	(4)
2002–2003	Eintracht Frankfurt	16	(3)
2003–2005	Erzgebirge Aue	43	(5)
2005–2006	Jahn Regensburg	22	(5)
2006–2008	Kickers Offenbach	40	(10)
2008–2009	FC Augsburg	5	(0)
2009–2010	F91 Dudelange		
2010–2012	FSV Salmrohr		
2012–2014	SV Mehring		
2014–2016	RM Hamm Benfica		

Managerial career
- 2013–2014: SV Mehring
- 2014–2016: RM Hamm Benfica
- 2016–2019: F91 Dudelange
- 2019: Virton
- 2023–2026: Eintracht Frankfurt
- 2026: Lens
- * Club domestic league appearances and goals

Dino Nicolas Toppmöller (born 23 November 1980) is a German professional football manager and former player who was most recently the manager of Ligue 1 side Lens.

== Club career ==
Over his career, Toppmöller played 31 Regionalliga matches with six goals and 128 games in the 2. Bundesliga, scoring 20 goals. His clubs included 1. FC Saarbrücken, VfL Bochum and Eintracht Frankfurt, in which he made 16 appearances and scored three goals, including two decisive goals in a 2–0 away victory against Rot-Weiß Oberhausen. He later joined Erzgebirge Aue, Jahn Regensburg, Kickers Offenbach and FC Augsburg, Luxembourg's F91 Dudelange, FSV Salmrohr, where he served as captain and top scorer, and SV Mehring, where he also worked as player-assistant coach. Later, as player-coach at RM Hamm Benfica, he led the team to promotion and concluded his playing career after ensuring their survival in Luxembourg's top division.

== Managerial career ==
In June 2016, Toppmöller became manager of F91 Dudelange, having taken them to the group stages of the UEFA Europa League for the first time in the club's history in the 18-19 campaign, which F91 Dudelange finished with one point following a draw in their last game against Real Betis. This feat made history in Luxembourg's football history, as Dudelange were not just the first team to have ever qualified in the group stages of any European competition, but they also managed to obtain a point. He joined Belgian outfit Virton following that season, having spent a brief stint with them before being released after just one season.

On 20 July 2020, he was introduced as assistant coach to Julian Nagelsmann at RB Leipzig. On 18 June 2021, he followed coach Nagelsmann to be his assistant at Bayern Munich. On 24 March 2023, Nagelsmann was sacked by Bayern along with his assistant coaches including Toppmöller.

=== Eintracht Frankfurt ===
On 12 June 2023, Toppmöller was appointed as manager of Bundesliga club Eintracht Frankfurt. On 15 May 2025, Toppmöller extended his contract with Eintracht Frankfurt until June 2028. In the 2024–25 season, Frankfurt secured third place in the league, earning qualification for the UEFA Champions League.

He parted ways with the club on 18 January 2026.

=== Lens ===
On 16 June 2026, Toppmöller signed with Ligue 1 side Lens. He won a trophy in his first official match in charge of the club, guiding Lens to a 1–0 victory over Paris Saint-Germain in the 2026 Trophée des Champions. On 15 September 2026, Lens announced Toppmöller had left the club by mutual consent, with a record of three wins, one draw and two losses.

== Personal life ==
He is the son of Klaus Toppmöller. He was named after Dino Zoff.

== Managerial statistics ==
As of 13 September 2026

Managerial record by team and tenure
Team	From	To	Record								Ref.
Team	From	To	G	W	D	L	GF	GA	GD	Win %	Ref.
F91 Dudelange	1 July 2016	30 June 2019	110	77	17	16	309	115	+194	70.00	
Virton	1 July 2019	2 December 2019	18	9	2	7	29	17	+12	50.00	
Eintracht Frankfurt	1 July 2023	18 January 2026	122	52	35	35	224	185	+39	42.62	
Lens	16 June 2026	15 September 2026	6	3	1	2	12	9	+3	50.00	
Total			256	141	55	60	574	326	+248	55.08	

== Honours ==
=== Manager ===
F91 Dudelange

- Luxembourg National Division: 2016–17, 2017–18, 2018–19
- Luxembourg Cup: 2016–17, 2018–19

RC Lens

- Trophée des Champions: 2026
