= Marco Neppe =

German footballer

Personal information
- Date of birth: 14 June 1986 (age 40)
- Place of birth: Offenbach, West Germany
- Position: Right-back

Youth career
- –2005: Eintracht Frankfurt

Senior career*
Years	Team	Apps	(Gls)
2005–2007	Eintracht Frankfurt II	53	(5)
2007–2010	Wuppertaler SV Borussia	76	(2)
2010–2011	SV Wehen Wiesbaden	14	(0)
2011–2012	VfL Osnabrück	14	(0)
2012–2013	Wuppertaler SV Borussia	16	(0)
2013–2014	Alemannia Aachen	30	(1)
Total		203	(8)
- * Club domestic league appearances and goals

Marco Neppe (born 14 June 1986) is a German former footballer.

== Playing career ==
Neppe started his career at Eintracht Frankfurt II until 2007. From 2007 to 2010, he played for Wuppertaler SV Borussia, before he had short spells at SV Wehen Wiesbaden and VfL Osnabrück. In September 2012, Neppe returned to Wuppertaler SV. In July 2013, he joined Alemannia Aachen for the 2013–14 season.

== Administrative career ==
On 1 July 2014, Neppe ended his football career and became assistant to technical director Michael Reschke at Bayern Munich. After Reschke's move to VfB Stuttgart, Neppe was promoted to head of the scouting department at Bayern Munich at the start of the 2017–18 season. In the course of restructuring, Bayern Munich appointed Neppe as technical director in December 2021. However, his contract with Bayern was terminated by mutual agreement in March 2024. On September 24, 2025, Neppe was announced as the new Sporting Director for Ligue 1 club Paris FC, replacing François Ferracci in the role effective October 1, 2025.
