= Rajko Tavčar =

Slovenian footballer

Personal information
- Date of birth: 21 July 1974 (age 52)
- Place of birth: Kranj, Yugoslavia
- Height: 1.80 m (5 ft 11 in)
- Positions: Midfielder; left back

Youth career
- –1980: TSV Ost München
- 1980–1994: MSV München
- 1994–1995: TSV Ottobrunn

Senior career*
Years	Team	Apps	(Gls)
1995–1996	SpVgg Unterhaching	1	(0)
1996–1997	FC Augsburg	18	(1)
1997–1998	Greuther Fürth	0	(0)
1998–1999	Wehen Wiesbaden	17	(1)
1999–2000	Fortuna Köln	28	(0)
2000–2002	1. FC Nürnberg	42	(1)
2002–2003	Wacker Burghausen	13	(1)
2003–2004	Mainz 05	7	(0)
2003–2004	Mainz 05 II	5	(0)
2004–2007	SpVgg Unterhaching	41	(0)
2004–2005	SpVgg Unterhaching II	3	(0)

International career
2000–2002	Slovenia	7	(0)
- * Club domestic league appearances and goals

Rajko Tavčar (born 21 July 1974) is a Slovenian former professional footballer who played as a midfielder or left back.

== International career ==
Tavčar made his debut for Slovenia in an August 2000 friendly match away against the Czech Republic, coming on as a 46th-minute substitute for Đoni Novak, and earned a total of 7 caps, scoring no goals. He was a participant at the 2002 FIFA World Cup. and played his final international game there against Paraguay.
