= Lars Weißenfeldt =

German footballer

Personal information
- Date of birth: February 15, 1980 (age 46)
- Place of birth: Marburg, West Germany
- Height: 1.80 m (5 ft 11 in)
- Position: Defender

Senior career*
| Years | Team | Apps | (Gls) |
| –2001 | VfB Marburg | | |
| 2001–2003 | Eintracht Frankfurt II | 9 | (0) |
| 2003–2004 | Eintracht Frankfurt | 11 | (0) |
| 2004–2007 | Kickers Offenbach | 51 | (1) |
| 2007–2009 | FSV Frankfurt | 50 | (1) |
| 2010–2011 | Viktoria Berlin | 0 | (0) |
- * Club domestic league appearances and goals as of 1 November 2011

Lars Weißenfeldt (born February 15, 1980, in Marburg) is a retired German footballer.
