= SG Rommerz =

German football club

- Full name: SG Blau-Weiss Rommerz 1920 e. V.
- Founded: 1920
- Ground: Kemmete-Stadion
- Capacity: 2,000
- League: Kreisliga A Fulda (IX)
- 2014–15: 7th
Home colours	Away colours

SG Rommerz or SG Blau-Weiss Rommerz is a German association football club based in Rommerz, near Neuhof in Hesse. The club was founded in 1920 and currently plays in the tier nine Kreisliga A Fulda.

In August 2006, Rommerz hosted Bundesliga side Eintracht Frankfurt and was beaten 1–11.
