= Bakary Diakité =

German-Malian footballer

Personal information
- Date of birth: 9 November 1980 (age 46)
- Place of birth: Frankfurt am Main, West Germany
- Height: 1.80 m (5 ft 11 in)
- Position: Striker

Youth career
- 1984–1987: SV Bonames
- 1987–1998: Eintracht Frankfurt
- 1998–1999: VfL Bochum

Senior career*
Years	Team	Apps	(Gls)
1999–2000	VfL Bochum II	3	(0)
2000–2002	De Graafschap	23	(0)
2002–2003	Eintracht Frankfurt	16	(3)
2002–2003	Eintracht Frankfurt II	12	(5)
2003–2005	Nice	8	(1)
2005–2006	Wehen Wiesbaden	46	(19)
2006–2009	Mainz 05	9	(1)
2007	→ TuS Koblenz (loan)	14	(0)
2007–2008	→ Wehen Wiesbaden (loan)	28	(7)
2008–2009	Wehen Wiesbaden	16	(1)
2009–2010	FSV Frankfurt	6	(0)
2010–2011	Foolad	18	(5)
2011–2012	Gostaresh	15	(7)
2013	Army United	2	(0)
Total		216	(49)

International career
2008–2009	Mali	9	(6)
- * Club domestic league appearances and goals

Bakary Diakité (born 9 November 1980) is a German-Malian former professional footballer who played as a striker.
