= Adebowale Ogungbure =

Nigerian footballer

Personal information
- Date of birth: 13 July 1981 (age 45)
- Place of birth: Lagos, Nigeria
- Height: 1.84 m (6 ft 0 in)
- Position: Midfielder

Team information
- Current team: Vissai Ninh Bình

Youth career
- Nigerdock Lagos
- NEPA Lagos
- ASACO Cotonou

Senior career*
Years	Team	Apps	(Gls)
1998–2000	1. FC Nürnberg II		
2000–2001	1. FC Nürnberg	12	(0)
2002–2003	SSV Reutlingen	32	(3)
2003–2005	Energie Cottbus	36	(0)
2005–2007	FC Sachsen Leipzig	43	(0)
2007–2008	Kickers Offenbach	15	(0)
2011	Vissai Ninh Bình	22	(2)
Total		160	(5)
- * Club domestic league appearances and goals

Adebowale OgungbureAdebowale Ogungbure (born 13 July 1981) is a Nigerian former professional footballer who played as a midfielder. He previously played for one season in the Bundesliga with 1. FC Nürnberg.

On 25 March 2006, in a match between FC Sachsen Leipzig and Hallescher FC, Ogungbure was the subject of monkey noises from Hallescher FC Fans. In retaliation he placed two fingers above his mouth and saluted at the crowd – a reference to Adolf Hitler. First, Ogungbure was accused and reported by German police, as it is illegal to make Nazi gestures for political or abusive purposes, but criminal proceedings were dropped 24 hours later.

The team and especially a group of the supporters of FC Sachsen came up with a campaign to show their solidarity with Ogungbure. The fans' campaign "Wir sind Ade" (We are Ade-bowale) managed to raise attention for Ogungbure's situation and against racism in Germany. The initiative still exists as "Bunte Kurve" (colourful fan stand).
