= Jens Keller =

German football player and manager (born 1970)

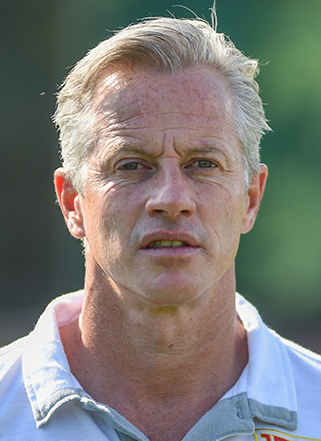
- Keller as Union Berlin manager in 2016

Personal information
- Date of birth: 24 November 1970 (age 55)
- Place of birth: Stuttgart, West Germany
- Height: 1.82 m (6 ft 0 in)
- Position: Defender

Youth career
- 1981–1987: VfL Wangen
- 1987–1990: VfB Stuttgart

Senior career*
Years	Team	Apps	(Gls)
1990–1992	VfB Stuttgart	1	(0)
1992–1996	1860 Munich	48	(1)
1996–1998	VfL Wolfsburg	75	(4)
1998–2000	VfB Stuttgart	48	(1)
2000–2002	1. FC Köln	55	(0)
2002–2005	Eintracht Frankfurt	50	(3)
Total		284	(9)

Managerial career
- 2010: VfB Stuttgart
- 2012–2014: Schalke 04
- 2016–2017: Union Berlin
- 2018–2019: FC Ingolstadt
- 2019–2020: 1. FC Nürnberg
- 2023–2024: SV Sandhausen
- * Club domestic league appearances and goals

Jens Keller (German pronunciation: [ˈjɛns ˈkɛl.lɐ]; born 24 November 1970) is a German football manager and former player who played as a defender. He last managed SV Sandhausen.

== Playing career ==
Keller played professionally for VfB Stuttgart, 1860 Munich, VfL Wolfsburg, 1. FC Köln and Eintracht Frankfurt.

== Managerial career ==
=== VfB Stuttgart ===
On 13 October 2010, Keller became interim manager of VfB Stuttgart until a permanent appointment had been found. He was replaced by Bruno Labbadia after two months in charge of the team on 12 December 2010. He finished with a record of five wins, three draws, and five losses.

=== FC Schalke 04 ===
On 16 December 2012, Keller was promoted from his position as the U17 coach to be the new head coach. His contract for Schalke 04 was set to last until the end of the season. On 10 May 2013, Keller's contract with Schalke 04 was extended for two more seasons.

After only two wins in 10 matches in the 2014–15 season, Keller was sacked on 7 October 2014 and succeeded by Roberto Di Matteo as head coach. He finished with a record of 36 wins, 16 draws, and 24 losses.

=== Union Berlin ===
On 11 April 2016, Keller was announced as the new manager of 2. Bundesliga side Union Berlin for the start of their 2016–17 campaign. His contract goes to 30 June 2018.

On 4 December 2017, Keller was sacked and replaced by André Hofschneider. He finished with a record of 27 wins, 12 draws, and 15 losses.

=== FC Ingolstadt ===
He was appointed as the new head coach of FC Ingolstadt on 2 December 2018. He was sacked on 2 April 2019.

=== 1. FC Nürnberg ===
Keller was hired by 1. FC Nürnberg on 12 November 2019. He was sacked on 29 June 2020.

=== SV Sandhausen ===
He was appointed the new head coach of SV Sandhausen on 23 October 2023. In May 2024, he resigned.

== Managerial statistics ==
As of match played 1 March 2024

Managerial record by team and tenure
Team	From	To	Record								Ref
Team	From	To	G	W	D	L	GF	GA	GD	Win %	Ref
VfB Stuttgart	13 October 2010	11 December 2010	13	5	3	5	26	20	+6	38.46	
Schalke 04	16 December 2012	7 October 2014	77	36	17	24	130	112	+18	46.75	
Union Berlin	1 July 2016	4 December 2017	54	27	12	15	89	69	+20	50.00	
FC Ingolstadt	2 December 2018	2 April 2019	12	3	2	7	12	16	−4	25.00	
1. FC Nürnberg	12 November 2019	29 June 2020	21	5	8	8	24	31	−7	23.81	
SV Sandhausen	23 October 2023	12 May 2024	18	9	5	4	32	25	+7	50.00	
Total			195	85	47	63	313	273	+40	43.59	—
