= Daniel Rosin =

German footballer

Personal information
- Date of birth: 18 May 1980 (age 46)
- Place of birth: Freital, Bezirk Dresden, East Germany
- Height: 1.88 m (6 ft 2 in)
- Position: Defender

Youth career
- 1984–1987: Aufbau Rabenau
- 1987–1989: Stahl Freital
- 1989–1998: Dynamo Dresden

Senior career*
| Years | Team | Apps | (Gls) |
| 1998–1999 | Dynamo Dresden | 0 | (0) |
| 1999–2000 | Bayern Munich (A) | 21 | (2) |
| 2000–2003 | Alemannia Aachen | 32 | (2) |
| 2003–2008 | SV Wacker Burghausen | 74 | (5) |
| 2008–2009 | 1. FC Magdeburg | 32 | (1) |
| 2009–2012 | RB Leipzig | 28 | (3) |
- * Club domestic league appearances and goals as of 20:16, 14 December 2008 (UTC)

Daniel Rosin (born 18 May 1980 in Freital, East Germany) is a German footballer.

Rosin had a trial with Rangers in 2002, but did not impress the manager during this time.
