= FC Germania 06 Schwanheim =

German football club

- Full name: Fußball Club Germania 06 e.V.
- Founded: 3 November 1906
- Ground: Waldsportplatz
- Manager: Tareq Azizi
- League: Verbandsliga Hessen-Mitte (VI)
- 2015–16: 14th
Home colours	Away colours

FC Germania 06 Schwanheim is a German association football club based in Schwanheim, Frankfurt.

== History ==
The club was formed on 3 November 1906 by a group of a dozen of the local youth who preferred to play football on their Sunday afternoons rather than spend more time in church.

They enjoyed some success playing locally and by 1910 had become part of the Süddeutschen Fußballverband (South German Football League). The club paid a heavy price in World War I with over 50 club members losing their lives in the conflict. Following the war the area was under French administration and permission had to be sought from authorities to play each match. However, the club was able to thrive, playing A-class football at the local level. They won consecutive titles in 1921, 1922, and 1923 and moved up to higher level city competition before a championship there in 1935 elevated them to regional play. Following World War II Germania played for the most part in city level leagues and while they stayed competitive, they were unable to advance to higher level play. The club was promoted to the Bezirksoberliga Wiesbaden (VII) in 1998 and, after a second-place result there in 2003, took part in the promotion rounds for the Landesliga Hessen-Mitte (VI) but was unsuccessful in their attempt to move up. They would later succeed, advancing on the strength of a 2005 Bezirksoberliga title, but a last place Landesliga finish in 2006–07 had returned the team to Bezirksoberliga play.

After a number of seasons in the Gruppenliga Wiesbaden, the former Bezirksoberliga, Germania earned promotion to the Verbandsliga in 2012.
