= Albert Streit =

Romanian-German footballer

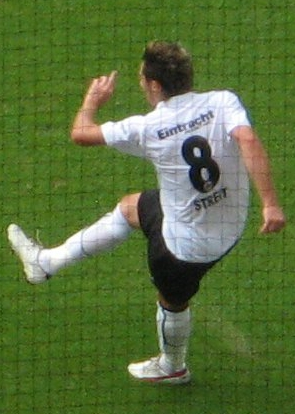
- Streit in 2007

Personal information
- Date of birth: 28 March 1980 (age 46)
- Place of birth: Bucharest, Romania
- Height: 1.80 m (5 ft 11 in)
- Position: Midfielder

Youth career
- 1986–1989: FV Zuffenhausen
- 1989–1997: VfB Stuttgart
- 1997–2001: Eintracht Frankfurt

Senior career*
| Years | Team | Apps | (Gls) |
| 2001–2003 | Eintracht Frankfurt | 53 | (2) |
| 2003 | VfL Wolfsburg | 5 | (1) |
| 2004–2006 | 1. FC Köln | 78 | (8) |
| 2006–2007 | Eintracht Frankfurt | 40 | (4) |
| 2008–2011 | Schalke 04 | 14 | (0) |
| 2009–2011 | Schalke 04 II | 26 | (2) |
| 2009 | → Hamburger SV (loan) | 10 | (0) |
| 2009 | → Hamburger SV II (loan) | 2 | (0) |
| 2012–2013 | Alemannia Aachen | 28 | (4) |
| 2013–2014 | Viktoria Köln | 9 | (3) |
| 2014 | Fortuna Köln | 6 | (2) |
| Total | | 271 | (25) |

International career
| | Germany U16 | 3 | (0) |
| | Germany U17 | 1 | (0) |
| | Germany U18 | 5 | (0) |
| 2003–2004 | Germany Team 2006 | 4 | (0) |
- * Club domestic league appearances and goals

Albert Streit (born Albert Ursachi 28 March 1980) is a former professional footballer who played as a midfielder. Born in Romania, he represented Germany internationally at youth level.

== Career ==
Streit signed a three-year contract with Eintracht Frankfurt following the relegation of his previous team, 1. FC Köln, on 9 May 2006.

At the end of the season of 2006–07, he announced that had come to an agreement about his move to Schalke 04. Eintracht manager Friedhelm Funkel benched him for a few matches, arguing Streit was not training well. After an accord between Streit and Eintracht executive Heribert Bruchhagen he would have been allowed to move to Schalke if Streit would play hard in the final matches. The transfer finally failed because Schalke executive Andreas Müller refused to pay more than €2 million and Eintracht clearly turned down the offer.

Streit has repeatedly stated that his performances would be worthy to a call up for Germany, but Joachim Löw has so far refused to nominate him.

In October 2007, Eintracht chairman Bruchhagen offered him an improved two-year contract, but Streit announced on 12 November that he signed a four-year contract for Schalke beginning in summer of 2008. But in December 2007, Eintracht Frankfurt agreed to a prematurely move of Streit to Schalke in January 2008.

In January 2009, Streit was thrown out of the squad of the first team of Schalke. He had to play for the second team of Schalke in the Regionalliga. He joined Hamburger SV on 2 February 2009 on loan until the end of the season. After his return in July 2009, he was demoted to the Schalke 04 reserve team. His contract ended on 30 June 2012.

In December 2011 and after his former coach Funkel took over in Alemannia Aachen, it was announced that Streit will join the club until the end of the season.

On 6 January 2014, Streit cancelled the contract with Viktoria Köln. He signed for Fortuna Köln shortly afterwards, and helped them win promotion to the 3. Liga before retiring at the end of the 2013–14 season.

== Personal life ==
Streit was born in Bucharest, Romania to Călin Ursachi and Renate Streit, he later took his mother's last name when his parents divorced.
