= Matheus Vivian =

Brazilian footballer

Personal information
- Full name: Matheus Coradini Vivian
- Date of birth: 5 April 1982 (age 44)
- Place of birth: Caçapava do Sul, Brazil
- Height: 1.88 m (6 ft 2 in)
- Position: Defender

Senior career*
Years	Team	Apps	(Gls)
1999–2002	Grêmio	12	(0)
2002–2003	Eintracht Frankfurt	10	(0)
2003–2004	→ Botafogo (on loan)	2	(0)
2004	Las Palmas	8	(1)
2004–2005	Ceuta	13	(1)
2005	Botafogo	5	(0)
2005–2007	Grenoble	57	(7)
2007–2010	Metz	74	(2)
2010–2012	Nantes	62	(5)
2012–2013	PAOK	7	(0)
2013–2014	Guingamp	6	(0)
2014–2017	Sochaux	35	(1)
Total		291	(17)

International career
1999	Brazil U-17		
- * Club domestic league appearances and goals

Matheus Coradini Vivian (born 5 April 1982) is a Brazilian former professional footballer. He also holds an Italian passport.

== Club career ==
Vivian was born in Caçapava do Sul, Rio Grande do Sul, Brazil. He started his professional at Grêmio. He was signed by Eintracht Frankfurt on 9 July 2002. He then return to Brazil to play for Botafogo de Futebol e Regatas on loan, and signed by Las Palmas in January 2004. He then moved to Ceuta in summer 2004, and then back to Botafogo on 22 February 2005. But on 25 August 2005, he was signed by Grenoble Foot 38 of Ligue 2.

After seven years in France, Ligue 1 and Ligue 2, he signed for PAOK FC a two-year deal in August 2012 as a free agent.

In January 2013, his contract was terminated. He joined Ligue 2 side En Avant de Guingamp in January 2013 on a 1 1/2-year contract.

== International career ==
He won 1999 FIFA U-17 World Championship with Brazil.
