= David Montero (footballer, born 1974) =

German footballer

Personal information
- Full name: David Montero Petracca
- Date of birth: 16 January 1974 (age 52)
- Place of birth: Stuttgart, West Germany
- Height: 1.70 m (5 ft 7 in)
- Position: Midfielder

Youth career
- TSV Georgii-Allianz Stuttgart
- SV Heslach

Senior career*
Years	Team	Apps	(Gls)
1996–1999	TSF Ditzingen		
1999–2002	Waldhof Mannheim	93	(10)
2002–2003	Eintracht Frankfurt	30	(3)
2003–2005	Rot-Weiß Oberhausen	60	(3)
2005–2007	Jahn Regensburg	16	(0)
2007–2008	SG Sonnenhof Großaspach	32	(0)
2008–2009	TSG Backnang		
2009–2010	SV Böblingen		
- * Club domestic league appearances and goals

David Montero Petracca (born 16 January 1974) is a German former professional footballer who played as a midfielder.

== Career ==
Montero was born in Stuttgart, West Germany. He spent one season in the Bundesliga with Eintracht Frankfurt. Before 1998 he was known as David Petracca.
