= Daniyel Cimen =

German football manager and footballer

Personal information
- Full name: Daniyel Cimen
- Date of birth: 19 January 1985 (age 41)
- Place of birth: Hanau, West Germany
- Height: 1.76 m (5 ft 9 1/2 in)
- Position: Midfielder

Team information
- Current team: Barockstadt Fulda-Lehnerz (head coach)

Youth career
- 1989–1994: SG Nieder-Roden
- 1994–2002: Eintracht Frankfurt

Senior career*
Years	Team	Apps	(Gls)
2002–2007	Eintracht Frankfurt	29	(1)
2007	→ Eintracht Braunschweig (loan)	13	(0)
2007–2008	Kickers Offenbach	13	(0)
2008–2010	FC Erzgebirge Aue	34	(0)
2010–2012	Eintracht Frankfurt II	58	(8)
2013–2019	FC Hanau 93	54	(2)
2019–2023	SpVgg Groß-Umstadt	13	(1)
2023–2024	FC Gießen II	?	(?)

International career
2005	Germany Team 2006	1	(0)

Managerial career
- 2012–2014: Eintracht Frankfurt U19
- 2015–2017: Rot-Weiss Frankfurt
- 2017–2018: Teutonia Watzenborn-Steinberg
- 2018–2024: FC Gießen
- 2024–: Barockstadt Fulda-Lehnerz
- * Club domestic league appearances and goals as of 13 January 2021

Daniyel Cimen (German pronunciation: [ˈtʃiːmən]; born 19 January 1985 in Hanau) is a German football manager and footballer who last played for FC Gießen II. He is currently the head coach of Barockstadt Fulda-Lehnerz.

He was playing for Eintracht Frankfurt, but had some problems earning a spot in the regular squad. Eintracht Frankfurt loaned him to the then 2. Bundesliga side Eintracht Braunschweig. After being relegated with Braunschweig, Cimen joined Frankfurt rival Kickers Offenbach in June 2007. Cimen moved from Kickers Offenbach to FC Erzgebirge Aue in July 2008, but returned to Eintracht Frankfurt in summer of 2010.

== Managerial career ==
Cimen was the manager of the U19 team of Eintracht Frankfurt, while he was playing a season for Kreisoberliga Hanau (VIII)-side FC Hanau 93. He was hired in the summer of 2012, after leaving the club as a player, and was sacked as manager in the summer of 2014 due to bad results.

In the summer of 2015, Cimen was hired as the new manager of Rot-Weiss Frankfurt.

== Honours ==
=== Club ===
Eintracht Frankfurt
- DFB-Pokal Runner-up: 2005–06
