= 1976–77 Liverpool F.C. season =

English football club season

Liverpool F.C.
1976–77 season
- Chairman: John W Smith
- Manager: Bob Paisley
- First Division: Champions
- European Cup: Winners
- FA Cup: Runners-up
- League Cup: Second round
- FA Charity Shield: Winners
- Top goalscorer: League: Kevin Keegan (12); All: Kevin Keegan (20)
- Average home league attendance: 47,284
Home colours	Away colours

The 1976–77 season was Liverpool Football Club's 85th season in existence and their 15th consecutive season in the First Division. Liverpool won their tenth Football League title after winning it for the second successive season, but lost out to Manchester United in the FA Cup final, their defeat preventing them from becoming the first English club to win three major trophies in the same season.

However, four days after their defeat in the FA Cup final, the club won the European Cup for the first time, beating Borussia Mönchengladbach 3–1 at the Olympic Stadium in Rome. In doing so, they became the second English and the third British club to win the trophy.

This was not only the final season, but the final game for Kevin Keegan before he moved to Hamburg for a British record transfer fee of £500,000.

One transfer that passed almost unnoticed as Liverpool were going for the treble, was the signing of Alan Hansen from Partick Thistle for £100,000.

== Squad ==
=== Goalkeepers ===
- (England) Ray Clemence
- (England) Peter McDonnell

=== Defenders ===
- (England) Emlyn Hughes
- (Wales) Joey Jones
- (England) Brian Kettle
- (England) Alec Lindsay
- (England) Phil Neal
- (England) Tommy Smith
- (England) Phil Thompson

=== Midfielders ===
- (England) Ian Callaghan
- (England) Jimmy Case
- (Republic of Ireland) Steve Heighway
- (England) Sammy Lee
- (England) Ray Kennedy
- (England) Terry McDermott
- (Scotland) Peter Cormack

=== Attackers ===
- (England) David Fairclough
- (England) Kevin Keegan
- (England) Kevin Kewley
- (Wales) John Toshack
- (England) Alan Waddle
- (England) David Johnson

== Squad statistics ==
=== Appearances and goals ===
No.	Pos	Nat	Player	Total		Division 1		FA Cup		Charity Shield		League Cup		European Cup	
No.	Pos	Nat	Player	Apps	Goals	Apps	Goals	Apps	Goals	Apps	Goals	Apps	Goals	Apps	Goals
	MF	(England) ENG	Ian Callaghan	48	2	32+1	1	4+1	0	1+0	0	2+0	1	7+0	0
	MF	(England) ENG	Jimmy Case	42	7	24+3	1	7+0	4	1+0	0	1+0	0	6+0	2
	GK	(England) ENG	Ray Clemence	62	0	42+0	0	8+0	0	1+0	0	2+0	0	9+0	0
	FW	(England) ENG	David Fairclough	30	5	12+8	3	4+1	1	0+0	0	0+2	0	1+2	1
	MF	(Republic of Ireland) IRL	Steve Heighway	58	14	39+0	8	7+0	3	1+0	0	2+0	0	9+0	3
	DF	(England) ENG	Emlyn Hughes	62	1	42+0	1	8+0	0	1+0	0	2+0	0	9+0	0
	FW	(England) ENG	David Johnson	37	8	19+7	5	3+1	0	0+0	0	2+0	0	4+1	3
	DF	(Wales) WAL	Joey Jones	59	3	39+0	3	8+0	0	1+0	0	2+0	0	9+0	0
	FW	(England) ENG	Kevin Keegan	57	20	38+0	12	8+0	4	1+0	0	2+0	0	8+0	4
	MF	(England) ENG	Ray Kennedy	61	9	41+0	7	8+0	1	1+0	0	2+0	0	9+0	1
	DF	(England) ENG	Brian Kettle	2	0	2+0	0	0+0	0	0+0	0	0+0	0	0+0	0
	DF	(England) ENG	Alec Lindsay	1	0	1+0	0	0+0	0	0+0	0	0+0	0	0+0	0
	MF	(England) ENG	Terry McDermott	38	4	25+1	1	5+0	1	0+0	0	0+0	0	6+1	2
	DF	(England) ENG	Phil Neal	61	13	42+0	7	8+0	2	1+0	0	2+0	0	8+0	4
	DF	(England) ENG	Tommy Smith	28	1	16+0	0	4+0	0	0+0	0	0+0	0	7+1	1
	DF	(England) ENG	Phil Thompson	36	2	26+0	2	4+0	0	1+0	0	2+0	0	3+0	0
	FW	(Wales) WAL	John Toshack	30	13	22+0	10	2+0	1	1+0	1	1+0	0	4+0	1
	FW	(England) ENG	Alan Waddle	1	0	0+0	0	0+0	0	0+0	0	0+0	0	0+1	0

== First Division ==
=== Table ===
Pos	Team	Pld	W	D	L	GF	GA	GD	Pts	Qualification or relegation
1	Liverpool (C)	42	23	11	8	62	33	+29	57	Qualification for the European Cup second round
2	Manchester City	42	21	14	7	60	34	+26	56	Qualification for the UEFA Cup first round
3	Ipswich Town	42	22	8	12	66	39	+27	52	Qualification for the UEFA Cup first round
4	Aston Villa	42	22	7	13	76	50	+26	51	Qualification for the UEFA Cup first round
5	Newcastle United	42	18	13	11	64	49	+15	49	Qualification for the UEFA Cup first round

Source: World Football
Rules for classification: 1) Points; 2) Goal difference; 3) Goals scored
(C) Champions

=== Matches ===
Date	Opponents	Venue	Result	Scorers	Attendance	Report 1	Report 2
21-Aug-76	Norwich City	H	1–0	Heighway 55'	49,753	Report	Report
24-Aug-76	West Bromwich Albion	A	1–0	Toshack 40'	30,334	Report	Report
28-Aug-76	Birmingham City	A	1–2	Johnson 75'	33,228	Report	Report
04-Sep-76	Coventry City	H	3–1	Keegan 56' Johnson 73' Toshack 80'	40,371	Report	Report
11-Sep-76	Derby County	A	3–2	Kennedy 6' Toshack 54' Keegan 80'	28,833	Report	Report
18-Sep-76	Tottenham Hotspur	H	2–0	Johnson 7' Heighway 30'	47,421	Report	Report
25-Sep-76	Newcastle United	A	0–1		33,204	Report	Report
02-Oct-76	Middlesbrough	H	0–0		45,107	Report	Report
16-Oct-76	Everton	H	3–1	Heighway 7' Neal 12' (pen.) Toshack 41'	55,141	Report	Report
23-Oct-76	Leeds United	A	1–1	Kennedy 72'	44,696	Report	Report
27-Oct-76	Leicester City	A	1–0	Toshack 12'	29,384	Report	Report
30-Oct-76	Aston Villa	H	3–0	Callaghan 76' McDermott 80' Keegan 86'	51,751	Report	Report
06-Nov-76	Sunderland	A	1–0	Fairclough 76'	39,956	Report	Report
09-Nov-76	Leicester City	H	5–1	Heighway 26' Toshack 32' Neal 70' (pen.) Jones 72' Keegan 82' (pen.)	39,851	Report	Report
20-Nov-76	Arsenal	A	1–1	Kennedy 88'	45,016	Report	Report
27-Nov-76	Bristol City	H	2–1	Keegan 44' Jones 56'	44,323	Report	Report
04-Dec-76	Ipswich Town	A	0–1		35,082	Report	Report
11-Dec-76	Queens Park Rangers	H	3–1	Toshack 34' Keegan 84' Kennedy 85'	37,154	Report	Report
15-Dec-76	Aston Villa	A	1–5	Kennedy 41'	42,851	Report	Report
18-Dec-76	West Ham United	A	0–2		24,175	Report	Report
27-Dec-76	Stoke City	H	4–0	Thompson 5' Neal 62' (pen.) Keegan 67' Johnson 81'	50,371	Report	Report
29-Dec-76	Manchester City	A	1–1	Own goal 89'	50,020	Report	Report
01-Jan-77	Sunderland	H	2–0	Kennedy 13' Thompson 69'	44,687	Report	Report
15-Jan-77	West Bromwich Albion	H	1–1	Fairclough 84'	39,195	Report	Report
22-Jan-77	Norwich City	A	1–2	Neal 52' (pen.)	25,913	Report	Report
05-Feb-77	Birmingham City	H	4–1	Neal 37' (pen.) Toshack 42', 72' Heighway 79'	41,072	Report	Report
16-Feb-77	Manchester United	A	0–0		57,487	Report	Report
19-Feb-77	Derby County	H	3–1	Toshack 56' Jones 69' Keegan 84'	44,202	Report	Report
05-Mar-77	Newcastle United	H	1–0	Heighway 11'	45,553	Report	Report
09-Mar-77	Tottenham Hotspur	A	0–1		32,098	Report	Report
12-Mar-77	Middlesbrough	A	1–0	Hughes 41'	29,000	Report	Report
22-Mar-77	Everton	A	0–0		56,562	Report	Report
02-Apr-77	Leeds United	H	3–1	Neal 36' (pen.) Fairclough 38' Heighway 61'	48,791	Report	Report
09-Apr-77	Manchester City	H	2–1	Keegan 43' Heighway 78'	55,283	Report	Report
11-Apr-77	Stoke City	A	0–0		29,905	Report	Report
16-Apr-77	Arsenal	H	2–0	Neal 20' Keegan 77'	48,174	Report	Report
30-Apr-77	Ipswich Town	H	2–1	Kennedy 70' Keegan 73'	56,044	Report	Report
03-May-77	Manchester United	H	1–0	Keegan 15'	53,046	Report	Report
07-May-77	Queens Park Rangers	A	1–1	Case 68'	29,382	Report	Report
10-May-77	Coventry City	A	0–0		38,032	Report	Report
14-May-77	West Ham United	H	0–0		55,675	Report	Report
16-May-77	Bristol City	A	1–2	Johnson 30'	38,688	Report	Report

== 1976 FA Charity Shield ==
14 August 1976
15:00 BST

Liverpool	1–0	Southampton
Toshack 50'	Report Report

Wembley Stadium, London
Attendance: 76,500
Referee: John Homewood

Liverpool	Southampton

GK	1	(England) Ray Clemence
RB	2	(England) Phil Neal
LB	3	(Wales) Joey Jones
CB	4	(England) Phil Thompson
LM	5	(England) Ray Kennedy
CB	6	(England) Emlyn Hughes
CF	7	(England) Kevin Keegan
CM	8	(England) Jimmy Case
CM	9	(Republic of Ireland) Steve Heighway
CF	10	(Wales) John Toshack
RM	11	(England) Ian Callaghan
Substitutes:
CF		(England) David Fairclough
DF		(England) Alec Lindsay
MF		(England) Terry McDermott
MF		(Scotland) Peter Cormack
GK		(England) Peter McDonnell
Manager:
(England) Bob Paisley

GK	1	(England) Ian Turner
DF	2	(Wales) Peter Rodrigues
DF	3	(England) David Peach
MF	4	(England) Nick Holmes
DF	5	(England) Mel Blyth	Substituted off
DF	6	(Scotland) Jim Steele
MF	7	(England) Paul Gilchrist
FW	8	(England) Mick Channon
FW	9	(England) Peter Osgood
FW	10	(Scotland) Jim McCalliog
MF	11	(England) Bobby Stokes
Substitutes:
MF		(Scotland) Hugh Fisher	Substituted on
Manager:
(England) Lawrie McMenemy

Match rules

- 90 minutes, no extra time
- Five named substitutes
- Maximum of three substitutions

== Football League Cup ==
Date	Opponents	Venue	Result	Scorers	Attendance	Report 1	Report 2
31-Aug-76	West Bromwich Albion	H	1–1	Callaghan 27'	23,378	Report	Report
06-Sep-76	West Bromwich Albion	A	0–1		22,662	Report	Report

== FA Cup ==
Date	Opponents	Venue	Result	Scorers	Attendance	Report 1	Report 2
08-Jan-77	Crystal Palace	H	0–0		44,730	Report	Report
11-Jan-77	Crystal Palace	A	3–2	Keegan 20' Heighway 66', 72'	42,664	Report	Report
29-Jan-77	Carlisle United	H	3–0	Keegan 17' Toshack 34' Heighway 69'	45,358	Report	Report
26-Feb-77	Oldham Athletic	H	3–1	Keegan 21' Case 31' Neal 73' (pen.)	52,455	Report	Report
19-Mar-77	Middlesbrough	H	2–0	Fairclough 55' Keegan 62'	55,881	Report	Report
23-Apr-77	Everton	N	2–2	McDermott 10' Case 73'	52,637	Report	Report
27-Apr-77	Everton	N	3–0	Neal 31' (pen.) Case 88' Kennedy 89'	52,579	Report	Report

=== Final ===
21 May 1977
15:00 BST

Liverpool	1–2	Manchester United
Case 53'	Report Report	Pearson 51'; J. Greenhoff 55'

Wembley Stadium, London
Attendance: 99,252
Referee: Bob Matthewson (Lancashire)

Liverpool	Manchester United

GK	1	(England) Ray Clemence
DF	2	(England) Phil Neal
DF	3	(Wales) Joey Jones
DF	4	(England) Tommy Smith
MF	5	(England) Ray Kennedy
DF	6	(England) Emlyn Hughes (c)
FW	7	(England) Kevin Keegan
MF	8	(England) Jimmy Case
MF	9	(Republic of Ireland) Steve Heighway
FW	10	(England) David Johnson	(substituted off) 64'
MF	11	(England) Terry McDermott
Substitute:
MF	12	(England) Ian Callaghan	(substituted on) 64'
Manager:
(England) Bob Paisley

GK	1	(England) Alex Stepney
DF	2	(Northern Ireland) Jimmy Nicholl
DF	3	(Scotland) Arthur Albiston
MF	4	(Northern Ireland) Sammy McIlroy
DF	5	(England) Brian Greenhoff
DF	6	(Scotland) Martin Buchan (c)
MF	7	(England) Steve Coppell
MF	8	(England) Jimmy Greenhoff
FW	9	(England) Stuart Pearson
FW	10	(Scotland) Lou Macari
MF	11	(England) Gordon Hill	(substituted off) 81'
Substitute:
MF	12	(Northern Ireland) David McCreery	(substituted on) 81'
Manager:
(Scotland) Tommy Docherty

Match rules

- 90 minutes.
- 30 minutes of extra-time if necessary.
- Replay if scores still level.
- One named substitute.

== European Cup ==
Date	Opponents	Venue	Result	Scorers	Attendance	Report 1	Report 2
14-Sep-76	(Northern Ireland) Crusaders	H	2–0	Neal 18' (pen.) Toshack 64'	22,442	Report	Report
28-Sep-76	(Northern Ireland) Crusaders	A	5–0	Keegan 34' Johnson 81', 90' McDermott 84' Heighway 87'	10,500	Report	Report
20-Oct-76	(Turkey) Trabzonspor	A	0–1		25,000	Report	Report
03-Nov-76	(Turkey) Trabzonspor	H	3–0	Heighway 8' Johnson 10' Keegan 19'	42,275	Report	Report
02-Mar-77	(France) AS Saint-Étienne	A	0–1		38,000	Report	Report
16-Mar-77	(France) AS Saint-Étienne	H	3–1	Keegan 2' Kennedy 59' Fairclough 84'	55,043	Report	Report
06-Apr-77	(Switzerland) FC Zürich	A	3–1	Neal 14', 67' (pen.) Heighway 48'	28,000	Report	Report
20-Apr-77	(Switzerland) FC Zürich	H	3–0	Case 33', 79' Keegan 83'	50,611	Report	Report

=== Final ===
25 May 1977
20:15

Borussia Mönchengladbach (West Germany)	1–3	(England) Liverpool
Simonsen 52'	Report Report	McDermott 28'; Smith 64'; Neal 82' (pen.)

Stadio Olimpico, Rome
Attendance: 57,000
Referee: Robert Wurtz (France)

Borussia Mönchengladbach	Liverpool

GK	1	(West Germany) Wolfgang Kneib
CB	2	(West Germany) Berti Vogts (c)
CB	3	(West Germany) Hans Klinkhammer
SW	4	(West Germany) Hans-Jürgen Wittkamp
RM	5	(West Germany) Rainer Bonhof
CM	6	(West Germany) Horst Wohlers		(substituted off) 79'
CF	7	(Denmark) Allan Simonsen
LM	8	(West Germany) Herbert Wimmer		(substituted off) 24'
CM	9	(West Germany) Uli Stielike	(yellow card) 85'
DM	10	(West Germany) Winfried Schäfer
CF	11	(West Germany) Jupp Heynckes
Substitutes:
GK		(West Germany) Wolfgang Kleff
MF	15	(West Germany) Wilfried Hannes		(substituted on) 79'
MF	12	(West Germany) Christian Kulik		(substituted on) 24'
FW		(West Germany) Kalle Del'Haye
FW		(West Germany) Herbert Heidenreich
Manager:
(Germany) Udo Lattek

GK	1	(England) Ray Clemence
RB	2	(England) Phil Neal
LB	3	(Wales) Joey Jones
CB	4	(England) Tommy Smith
LM	5	(England) Ray Kennedy
CB	6	(England) Emlyn Hughes (c)
CF	7	(England) Kevin Keegan
CM	8	(England) Jimmy Case
CF	9	(Republic of Ireland) Steve Heighway
RM	10	(England) Ian Callaghan
CM	11	(England) Terry McDermott
Substitutes:
GK	12	(England) Peter McDonnell
FW	13	(England) David Fairclough
FW	14	(England) David Johnson
MF	15	(England) Alan Waddle
DF	16	(England) Alec Lindsay
Manager:
(England) Bob Paisley
