= 1976 FA Charity Shield =

Liverpool	Southampton
1	0
- Date: 14 August 1976
- Venue: Wembley Stadium, London
- Referee: John Homewood (Sunbury)
- Attendance: 76,500

The 1976 FA Charity Shield was a football match played between Liverpool, as English First Division Champions in the 1975/76 season, and Second Division Southampton, as English FA Cup winners in 1976.

The match was played at Wembley Stadium, London, on Saturday 14 August 1976, in front of a crowd of 76,500.

The match was won by Liverpool 1–0 through a goal scored by John Toshack in the 50th minute with a right-foot shot from the edge of the penalty area after the ball was headed down to him by Kevin Keegan.

== Match details ==
14 August 1976
15:00 BST

Liverpool	1–0	Southampton
Toshack 50'	Report

Wembley Stadium, London
Attendance: 76,500
Referee: John Homewood

Liverpool	Southampton

GK	1	(England) Ray Clemence
RB	2	(England) Phil Neal
LB	3	(Wales) Joey Jones
CB	4	(England) Phil Thompson
LM	5	(England) Ray Kennedy
CB	6	(England) Emlyn Hughes (c)
CF	7	(England) Kevin Keegan
CM	8	(England) Jimmy Case
CF	9	(Republic of Ireland) Steve Heighway
CM	10	(Wales) John Toshack
RM	11	(England) Ian Callaghan
Substitutes:
CF		(England) David Fairclough
DF		(England) Alec Lindsay
MF		(England) Terry McDermott
MF		(Scotland) Peter Cormack
GK		(England) Peter McDonnell
Manager:
(England) Bob Paisley

GK	1	(England) Ian Turner
DF	2	(Wales) Peter Rodrigues (c)
DF	3	(England) David Peach
MF	4	(England) Nick Holmes
DF	5	(England) Mel Blyth	Substituted off
DF	6	(Scotland) Jim Steele
MF	7	(England) Paul Gilchrist
FW	8	(England) Mick Channon
FW	9	(England) Peter Osgood
FW	10	(Scotland) Jim McCalliog
MF	11	(England) Bobby Stokes
Substitutes:
MF		(Scotland) Hugh Fisher	Substituted on
Manager:
(England) Lawrie McMenemy

Match rules

- 90 minutes, no extra time
- Five named substitutes
- Maximum of three substitutions
