= Southampton F.C. in European football =

English club in European football

- Club: Southampton F.C.
- Seasons played: 9
- First entry: 1969–70 Inter-Cities Fairs Cup
- Latest entry: 2016–17 UEFA Europa League

Southampton Football Club is an English football club based in Southampton, Hampshire. The club was established in 1885, and has competed in the English football league system from 1920. Since their first qualification in the European cup competition in 1969, they have participated in the Inter-Cities Fairs Cup, the European Cup Winners' Cup, the UEFA Europa League and the Texaco Cup. The club qualified for European Football after the 2014–15 season through their league position for the first time since 1984.

== History ==
=== 1961–62 Anglo-French Friendship Cup ===
The Anglo-Franco Friendship Cup was a short-lived Inter-League competition that lasted for two seasons. The format had four teams from England competing against four teams from France. Individual clubs could not win the competition outright, so whatever countries' teams claimed the most aggregate wins overall would be declared the best league and win the trophy. The draw for the 1961–62 competition was; Saints v Bordeaux, Blackburn v Nancy, Lens v Cardiff, and Derby v Béziers.

13 November 1961	Southampton (England)	2 – 1	(France) Bordeaux	The Dell, Southampton, England
		Report

1 May 1962	Bordeaux (France)	2 – 0	(England) Southampton	Stade Chaban-Delmas, Bordeaux, France
	Davies; Paine	Report

Southampton lost 2–3 on aggregate, but the English League won 2–1 in aggregate victories (with one tied).

=== 1969–70 Inter-Cities Fairs Cup ===
The Saints' maiden European voyage was the 1969–70 Inter-Cities Fairs Cup, which they took part in with fellow English clubs Newcastle United, Liverpool and eventual winners Arsenal. Southampton's first opponents were Norwegian side Rosenborg. Despite losing 1–0 away, a comfortable 2–0 win at home in the second leg put Southampton into a Second Round tie with Portuguese side Vitória de Guimarães. A closely fought 3–3 away draw was followed by a 5–1 home win which saw them through to the last 16 where Southampton were drawn against fellow English side Newcastle United. A 0–0 away and 1–1 result at home meant that Southampton failed to progress to the quarter-finals after losing out on away goals.

==== First round ====
17 September 1969	Rosenborg (Norway)	1 – 0	(England) Southampton	Lerkendal Stadion, Trondheim, Norway
		Report		Attendance: 20,330

1 October 1969	Southampton (England)	2 – 0	(Norway) Rosenborg	The Dell, Southampton, England
	Davies; Paine	Report		Attendance: 22,329

Southampton won 2–1 on aggregate.

==== Second round ====
4 November 1969	Vitória de Guimarães (Portugal)	3 – 3	(England) Southampton	Estádio D. Afonso Henriques, Guimarães
	Mendes 12', 58'; Pinto 88' (pen.)		Channon 13'; Davies 63'; Paine 83'	Attendance: 10,000; Referee: Pius Kamber (Switzerland)

12 November 1969	Southampton (England)	5 – 1	(Portugal) Vitória de Guimarães	The Dell, Southampton, England
	Costeado 13' (o.g.); Davies 54' (pen.), 87'; Gabriel 55'; Channon 85'		Ademir 68'	Attendance: 21,414; Referee: Robert Fraunciel (France)

Southampton won 8–4 on aggregate.

==== Third round ====
17 December 1969	Newcastle United (England)	0 – 0	(England) Southampton	St James' Park, Newcastle, England
		Report		Attendance: 37,580

14 January 1970	Southampton (England)	1 – 1	(England) Newcastle United	The Dell, Southampton, England
	Channon	Report	Robson	Attendance: 25,182

Southampton lost on away goals.

=== 1971–72 UEFA Cup ===
After finishing seventh in the previous season, Southampton qualified for European competition for the second time in two years. Drawn in the first round against Athletic Bilbao, the Saints came from behind to win the first leg 2–1. However a fortnight later, they lost 2–0 away after conceding a late goal which confirmed their exit from the competition.

==== First round ====
15 September 1971	Southampton (England)	2 – 1	(Spain) Athletic Bilbao	The Dell, Southampton, England
19:30	Jenkins 64'; Channon 69' (pen.)	Report	Arieta 58'	Referee: Sergio Gonella (Italy)

29 September 1971	Athletic Bilbao (Spain)	2 – 0	(England) Southampton	San Mamés, Bilbao, Spain
20:00	Ortuondo 69'; Arieta 90'	Report		Referee: Paul Schiller (Austria)

Southampton lost 3–2 on aggregate.

=== 1974–75 Texaco Cup ===
After being relegated to the Second Division the previous season, Southampton qualified for the final instance of the short lived Texaco Cup. Alongside 15 other English teams split into four groups of Round Robin format, the top two from each group would progress to the quarter-finals where they would be drawn against Scottish opposition. Southampton's group consisted of West Ham, Luton Town and Leyton Orient which they topped after being undefeated. The knockout stages were a two-legged affair and Southampton were drawn a tough fixture against Rangers F.C. but managed to win convincingly 5–1 on aggregate despite playing away in front of 35,000. The semi final against Oldham Athletic proved just as routine with Southampton winning 5–2 over the two legs which progressed them through to the final against Newcastle United. Despite winning the first leg, the previous season's FA Cup finalists proved the gap between divisions was too large for Southampton to overcome and won the tournament with two goals in extra time.

==== Group stages ====
Team	Pld	W	D	L	GF	GA	GD	Pts
(England) Southampton	3	2	1	0	5	2	+3	5
(England) Luton Town	3	1	2	0	5	4	+1	4
(England) West Ham United	3	1	0	2	2	4	-2	2
(England) Leyton Orient	3	0	1	2	3	5	−2	1

3 August 1974	Luton Town (England)	1 – 1	(England) Southampton	Kenilworth Road, Luton, England
			Chatterly	Attendance: 8,445

6 August 1974	Southampton (England)	2 – 1	(England) Leyton Orient	The Dell, Southampton, England
	Osgood; Channon		Fairbrother	Attendance: 9,932

10 August 1974	Southampton (England)	2 – 0	(England) West Ham United	The Dell, Southampton, England
	Gilchrist 10'; O'Brien 65'	Report		Attendance: 11,364

==== Quarter final ====
18 September 1974	Rangers (Scotland)	1 – 3	(England) Southampton	Ibrox Stadium, Glasgow, Scotland
19:30			Osgood; O'Brien	Attendance: 35,000

1 October 1974	Southampton (England)	2 – 0	(Scotland) Rangers	The Dell, Southampton, England
19:30	Gilchrist; Own Goal			Attendance: 19,481

Southampton won 5–1 on aggregate.

==== Semi final ====
22 October 1974	Oldham Athletic (England)	1 – 3	(England) Southampton	Boundary Park, Oldham, England
19:20			Channon; Blyth	Attendance: 13,082

5 November 1974	Southampton (England)	2 – 1	(England) Oldham Athletic	The Dell, Southampton, England
19:30	Channon; Stokes			Attendance: 14,431

Southampton won 5–2 on aggregate.

==== Final ====
5 November 1974	Southampton (England)	1 – 0	(England) Newcastle United	The Dell, Southampton, England
19:30	Channon			Attendance: 17,100

22 October 1974	Newcastle United (England)	3 – 0 (a.e.t.)	(England) Southampton	St James' Park, Newcastle, England
19:20	Tudor 73', 113'; Cannell 118'			Attendance: 20,100

Southampton lost 3–1 on aggregate after extra time.

=== 1976–77 European Cup Winners' Cup ===
Despite being in the Second Division, Southampton caused a huge upset in the 1976 FA Cup Final by beating Manchester United 1–0. This qualified the Saints for the European Cup Winners' Cup competition where they were drawn in the first round against Olympique Marseille who had won the Coupe de France the previous season. Although suffering an away defeat, a 4–0 victory at home saw them through to the second round. Southampton travelled to Carrick Rangers of Northern Ireland who had won the Irish Cup to qualify for the tournament. A 9–3 aggregate win progressed high-scoring Southampton into the third round against Belgian Cup champions R.S.C. Anderlecht. Despite levelling the aggregate score to 2–2 in the second leg, Southampton conceded late on to be eliminated from the tournament. Anderlecht went on to reach the final.

==== First round ====
14 September 1976	Southampton (England)	4 – 0	(France) Marseille	The Dell, Southampton, England
22:00	Waldron 31'; Channon 34', 69' (pen.); Osgood 35'	Report		Attendance: 17,100; Referee: Pedro Maria Urrestarazu Elordi (Spain)

28 September 1976	Marseille (France)	2 – 1	(England) Southampton	Stade Vélodrome, Marseille, France
22:00	Nogués 26'; Emon 80'	Report	Peach 70'	Attendance: 20,100; Referee: Heinz Aldinger (Germany)

Southampton won 5–2 on aggregate.

==== Second round ====
19 October 1976	Carrick Rangers (Northern Ireland)	2 – 5	(England) Southampton	Taylors Avenue, County Antrim, Northern Ireland
22:00	Erwin 52'; Prenter 83'	Report	Stokes 10'; Channon 61', 85'; McCalliog 67'; Osgood 80'	Referee: Ole Amundsen (Denmark)

2 November 1976	Southampton (England)	4 – 1	(Northern Ireland) Carrick Rangers	The Dell, Southampton, England
22:00	Williams 16'; Hayes 31', 74'; Stokes 68'	Report	Reid 36'	Referee: Frans Derks (Netherlands)

Southampton won 9–3 on aggregate.

==== Quarter-finals ====
1 March 1977	Anderlecht (Belgium)	2 – 0	(England) Southampton	Constant Vanden Stock Stadium, Belgium
22:00	Ressel 30'; Rensenbrink 83'	Report		Referee: Walter Hungerbühler (Austria)

15 March 1977	Southampton (England)	2 – 1	(Belgium) Anderlecht	The Dell, Southampton, England
22:00	Peach 61' (pen.); MacDougall 77'	Report	Van der Elst 83'	Referee: Rudi Glöckner (Germany)

Southampton lost 3–2 on aggregate.

=== 1981–82 UEFA Cup ===
Southampton qualified for the UEFA Cup for the third time after finishing sixth in the First Division the previous season. In the first round, the Saints travelled to Ireland for the first time to play Limerick F.C., after a convincing 3–0 win and a 1–1 draw at home Southampton were through to the second round against Sporting Clube de Portugal. Despite a very respectable 0–0 away in Lisbon, the home defeat proved too much to overcome and Southampton were eliminated from the competition.

==== First round ====
16 September 1981	Limerick (Republic of Ireland)	0 – 3	(England) Southampton	Markets Field, Ireland
17:45		Report	Stephen Morgan 58', 59'; Armstrong 78'	Referee: Henk van Ettekoven (Netherlands)

29 September 1981	Southampton (England)	1 – 1	(Republic of Ireland) Limerick	The Dell, Southampton, England
19:30	Keegan 63'	Report	Walsh 65'	Referee: Rolf Nyhus (Norway)

Southampton won 4–1 on aggregate.

==== Second round ====
21 October 1981	Southampton (England)	2 – 4	(Portugal) Sporting CP	The Dell, Southampton, England
19:30	Keegan 68' (pen.); Channon 71'	Report	Jordão 2'; Holmes 20' (o.g.); Fernandes 45', 90+1'	Referee: Erik Fredriksson (Sweden)

4 November 1981	Sporting CP (Portugal)	0 – 0	(England) Southampton	Estádio José Alvalade, Lisbon, Portugal
21:00		Report		Referee: Ruedi Renggli (Switzerland)

Southampton lost 4–2 on aggregate.

=== 1982–83 UEFA Cup ===
Southampton qualified for a European Cup competition in successive seasons for the first time and played Swedish team IFK Norrköping in the first round. A 2–2 draw at The Dell meant that they exited the tournament on the away goals rule after a 0–0 result in Sweden.

==== First round ====
15 September 1982	Southampton (England)	2 – 2	(Sweden) IFK Norrköping	The Dell, Southampton, England
19:30	Armstrong 62'; Wright 86'	Report	Pettersson 48', 82'	Referee: Miklos Nagy (Hungary)

29 September 1982	IFK Norrköping (Sweden)	0 – 0	(England) Southampton	Nya Parken, Norrköping, Sweden
19:00		Report		Referee: Alexandr Mushkovets (Russia)

Southampton lost 2–2 on aggregate after the away goals rule.

=== 1984–85 UEFA Cup ===
In the 1983–84 Season, Southampton recorded their best ever finish in the First Division as runners up to Liverpool, just three points behind. In the first round of the UEFA Cup, they drew German opponents Hamburger SV. Despite a 0–0 draw at home in the first leg, Southampton were unable to claim victory in Hamburg and eventually lost 2–0.

==== First round ====
19 September 1984	Southampton (England)	0 – 0	(Germany) Hamburger SV	The Dell, Southampton, England
19:30		Report		Referee: Roger Schoeters (Belgium)

3 October 1984	Hamburger SV (Germany)	2 – 0	(England) Southampton	Imtech Arena, Hamburg, Germany
20:00	Kaltz 69' (pen.); McGhee 90'	Report		Referee: Paolo Bergamo (Italy)

Southampton lost 2-–0 on aggregate.

=== 2003–04 UEFA Cup ===
After almost two decades absent from European competition, Southampton qualified for the UEFA Cup after finishing runners up in the 2003 FA Cup Final. It was the first time that St. Mary's Stadium hosted a competitive European match. Following on from a 1–1 draw at home, Southampton conceded late on in Romania and found themselves eliminated from the first round for the third time in a row.

==== First round ====
24 September 2003	Southampton (England)	1 – 1	(Romania) Steaua București	St. Mary's Stadium, Southampton, England
19:30	Phillips 52'	Report	Răducanu 20'	Attendance: 30,557; Referee: Tommy Skjerven (Norway)

15 October 2003	Steaua București (Romania)	1 – 0	(England) Southampton	Stadionul Steaua, Bucharest, Romania
20:00	Răducanu 82'	Report		Attendance: 25,000; Referee: Stefan Johannesson (Sweden)

Southampton lost 2–1 on aggregate.

=== 2015–16 UEFA Europa League ===
Since the winners of the 2014–15 FA Cup, Arsenal, and winners of the 2014–15 Football League Cup, Chelsea, qualified for the Champions League based on league position, the spot awarded to the FA Cup winner (Europa League group stage) was passed to the sixth-placed team, Liverpool, and the spot awarded to the League Cup winner (Europa League third qualifying round) was passed to the seventh-placed team, Southampton. The draw for the third round was held on 17 July 2015, Southampton drew Dutch team Vitesse Arnhem who finished fifth in the previous season of the Eredivisie.

Vitesse (30 July and 6 August 2015)

Southampton entered the 2015–16 UEFA Europa League in the third qualifying round. Their first game took place against Dutch side Vitesse Arnhem on 30 July 2015, which the Saints won 3–0 at St Mary's Stadium. Graziano Pellè found the net first in the 36th minute to put Southampton one up, before Dušan Tadić scored a penalty just before half time. Substitute Shane Long finished the scoring late in the second half to win the game for the home side. In the second leg Southampton won 2–0, therefore advancing to the play-off round 5–0 on aggregate. Pellè scored again to put the Saints up in the fourth minute, with Sadio Mané doubling his side's lead just a minute before the end of the match.

Midtjylland (20 and 27 August 2015)

In the qualifying play-off round, Southampton faced FC Midtjylland. In the first leg the Saints drew 1–1 with the Danish champions, with Jay Rodriguez equalising after Tim Sparv's opener on the stroke of half-time. In the second leg, Midtjylland striker Morten Rasmussen scored the only goal of the game to ensure the Danish side won 2–1 on aggregate to eliminate Southampton from the competition.

==== Third qualifying round ====
30 July 2015	Southampton (England)	3 – 0	(Netherlands) Vitesse Arnhem	St. Mary's Stadium, Southampton, England
20:05 BST	Pellè 36'; Tadić 45' (pen.); Long 84'	Report		Attendance: 30,580; Referee: Jesús Gil Manzano (Spain)

6 August 2015	Vitesse Arnhem (Netherlands)	0 – 2	(England) Southampton	GelreDome, Arnhem, Netherlands
19:00 BST		Report	Pellè 4'; Mané 88'	Referee: Ilías Spathas (Greece)

Southampton won 5–0 on aggregate.

==== Play-off round ====
20 August 2015	Southampton (England)	1 – 1	(Denmark) Midtjylland	St. Mary's Stadium, Southampton, England
20:00 BST	Rodriguez 56' (pen.)	Report	Sparv 45'	Referee: Clément Turpin (France)

27 August 2015	Midtjylland (Denmark)	1 – 0	(England) Southampton	MCH Arena, Herning, Denmark
20:45 CEST	Rasmussen 28'	Report		Referee: Liran Liany (Israel)

Southampton lost 2–1 on aggregate.

=== 2016–17 UEFA Europa League ===
Since the winners of the 2015–16 Football League Cup, Manchester City qualified for the 2016–17 UEFA Champions League through their league position, the spot normally awarded to the League Cup winner was passed down to the team who finished in sixth place in the 2015–16 Premier League, Southampton. This was the first time that Southampton had participated in the Europa League group stage and on 26 August 2016, were drawn into Group K alongside Internazionale, Sparta Prague and Hapoel Be'er Sheva.

Sparta Prague (15 September 2016)

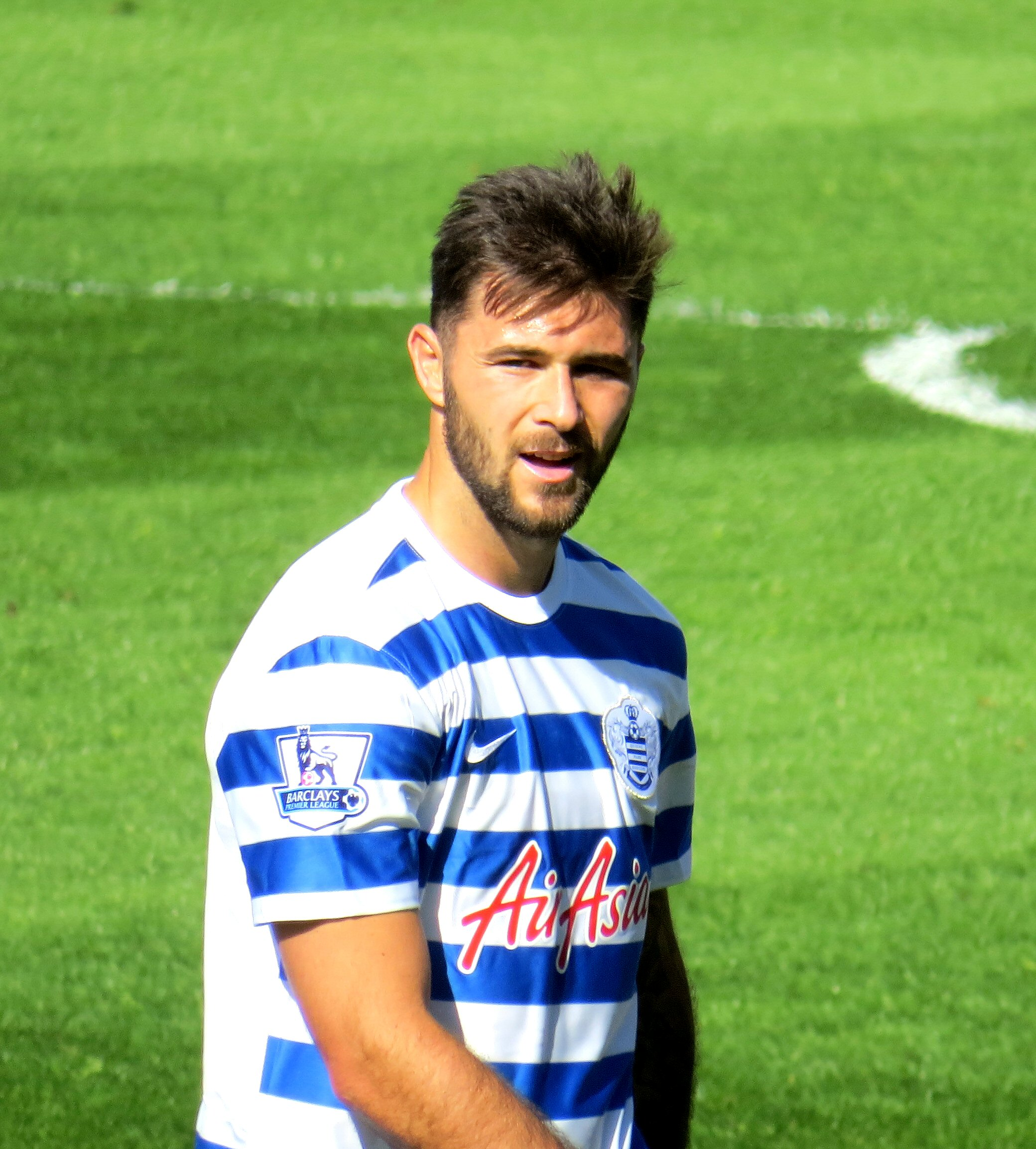
Charlie Austin scored twice in the opening game of the Europa League to help Southampton to a 3–0 win.

Southampton entered the 2016–17 UEFA Europa League at the group stage, when they were drawn in Group K with Internazionale, Sparta Prague and Hapoel Be'er Sheva. In the opening match against Sparta Prague on 15 September 2016, the Saints picked up their first win of the season when they beat the Czech side 3–0. Charlie Austin opened the scoring with a fifth-minute penalty, before doubling his side's lead 20 minutes later with a header. Jay Rodriguez scored a third in added time at the end of the match to send Southampton to the top of the group.

Hapoel Be'er Sheva (29 September 2016)

In their second match of the tournament, the Saints were held to a goalless draw at Israeli champions Hapoel Be'er Sheva. The game did not feature many goalscoring opportunities for either side in the first half, which Hapoel largely dominated, although James Ward-Prowse had a number of chances on goal after the break. The home side came closest to winning the game in the second half through Maor Melikson and Ben Sahar chances, however the deadlock stayed unbroken and both sides remained on level points at the top of the group table.

Internazionale (20 October 2016)

On 20 October 2016 the Saints travelled to the San Siro to face Internazionale, losing 1–0 to the Italian side. The visitors almost scored on a number of occasions in the first half, notably when Ward-Prowse's shot went over the crossbar and Cuco Martina's went wide of the post. Antonio Candreva scored the only goal of the game in the 67th minute, before Marcelo Brozović received a second booking and was sent off ten minutes later. However, Southampton could not take advantage of the extra player and succumbed to their first defeat in the tournament.

Internazionale (3 November 2016)

Southampton hosted Internazionale on 3 November 2016, winning 2–1 to secure second in the group K table. After Inter captain Mauro Icardi opened the scoring in the 33rd minute, the Saints were awarded a controversial penalty for a handball by Ivan Perišić just before half time, while Antonio Candreva was booked for an off-the-ball incident involving Sam McQueen. Dušan Tadić's penalty was saved by Samir Handanović, before the half ended with more drama between the players of both sides. The hosts increased the pressure in the second half, leading to defender Virgil van Dijk equalising in the 64th minute with a shot in the box following a corner. Less than five minutes later, Southampton went ahead as Yuto Nagatomo turned Tadić's cross into the Internazionale goal. Southampton held on and almost scored a third for an historic win.

Sparta Prague (24 November 2016)

On 24 November, Southampton lost at Sparta Prague by a single goal to remain second in the group. Despite dominating possession for most of the match, the Saints enjoyed few clear chances and went behind early on when defender Costa Nhamoinesu scored a volley from close range following a free kick, which was poorly defended by the Premier League club. Goalkeeper Fraser Forster made a number of saves to deny further goals, which Prague threatened to score later on in the game. The result left Southampton needing a goalless draw or win over Hapoel Be'er Sheva in the final group stage game in order to proceed to the knockout stages.

Hapoel Be'er Sheva (8 December 2016)

Southampton were knocked out of the UEFA Europa League on 8 December 2016 when they drew 1–1 with Hapoel Be'er Sheva at St Mary's Stadium. Despite the home side dominating much of the possession and having many more chances on goal, it was the visitors who took the advantage in the 78th minute when Maor Buzaglo scored the Israeli side's only shot on target after poor defending from the Saints, who were left needing two goals in just over ten minutes in order to advance to the knockout stages. Defender Virgil van Dijk pulled one back in stoppage time, and Maya Yoshida came close to winning the game with a last-minute header, but the game ended level and Hapoel finished the group in second place.

==== Group stage ====
15 September 2016	Southampton (England)	3 – 0	(Czech Republic) Sparta Prague	Southampton
20:05 BST	Austin 5' (pen.), 27'; Rodriguez 90+2'	Report		Stadium: St Mary's Stadium; Attendance: 25,125; Referee: Manuel Gräfe

29 September 2016	Hapoel Be'er Sheva (Israel)	0 – 0	(England) Southampton	Be'er Sheva, Israel
18:00 BST		Report		Stadium: Turner Stadium; Attendance: 16,138; Referee: Stefan Johannesson

20 October 2016	Internazionale (Italy)	1 – 0	(England) Southampton	Milan, Italy
19:00 BST	Candreva 67'	Report		Stadium: San Siro; Attendance: 26,719; Referee: Gediminas Mažeika

3 November 2016	Southampton (England)	2 – 1	(Italy) Internazionale	Southampton
20:05 GMT	van Dijk 64'; Nagatomo 69' (o.g.)	Report	Icardi 33'	Stadium: St Mary's Stadium; Attendance: 30,389; Referee: Paweł Gil

24 November 2016	Sparta Prague (Czech Republic)	1 – 0	(England) Southampton	Prague, Czech Republic
18:00 GMT	Nhamoinesu 11'	Report		Stadium: Generali Arena; Attendance: 17,429; Referee: Jesús Gil Manzano

8 December 2016	Southampton (England)	1 – 1	(Israel) Hapoel Be'er Sheva	Southampton
20:05 GMT	van Dijk 90+1'	Report	Buzaglo 78'	Stadium: St Mary's Stadium; Attendance: 30,416; Referee: Paolo Tagliavento

Pos	Team	Pld	W	D	L	GF	GA	GD	Pts	Qualification	SPP	HBS	SOU	INT
1	(Czech Republic) Sparta Prague	6	4	0	2	8	6	+2	12	Advance to knockout phase	—	2–0	1–0	3–1
2	(Israel) Hapoel Be'er Sheva	6	2	2	2	6	6	0	8	Advance to knockout phase	0–1	—	0–0	3–2
3	(England) Southampton	6	2	2	2	6	4	+2	8		3–0	1–1	—	2–1
4	(Italy) Internazionale	6	2	0	4	7	11	−4	6		2–1	0–2	1–0	—

Source: UEFA

== Overall record ==
Competition	Pld	W	D	L	GF	GA	GD
Inter-Cities Fairs Cup	6	2	3	1	11	6	5
UEFA Cup	12	2	6	4	12	13	−1
Texaco Cup	9	7	1	1	16	8	8
European Cup Winners' Cup	6	4	0	2	16	8	8
Europa League	10	4	3	3	12	6	6
Total	43	19	13	11	67	41	26
