= Steve Middleton =

English footballer

Personal information
- Full name: Stephen Roy Middleton
- Date of birth: 28 March 1953 (age 73)
- Place of birth: Portsmouth, England
- Height: 6 ft 0 in (1.83 m)
- Position: Goalkeeper

Youth career
- 1967–1970: Southampton

Senior career*
Years	Team	Apps	(Gls)
1970–1977	Southampton	24	(0)
1975	→ Torquay United (loan)	10	(0)
1977	Portsmouth	26	(0)
Total		60	(0)
- * Club domestic league appearances and goals

Stephen Roy Middleton (born 28 March 1953) is an English former footballer who played as a goalkeeper for local rivals Southampton and Portsmouth in the 1970s.

== Football career ==
Middleton was born in Portsmouth and attended Brune Park School in Gosport, where he played in goal for the school team and represented Gosport & Fareham Schools.

In December 1967, he joined Southampton as an associate schoolboy, signing as an apprentice in October 1969 and as a professional in July 1970. He made his debut for Southampton Reserves on 13 December 1969, when he conceded five goals at Birmingham City. By 1973 he was the regular reserve team 'keeper and made his first-team debut in place of the injured Eric Martin on 25 August 1973 (the opening day of the 1973–74 season); after keeping goal for the first three matches of the season (one draw, two victories), Middleton lost his place to the fit again Martin.

The signing of Ian Turner in March 1974 pushed Middleton down the order and in March 1975 he went on loan to Torquay United, where he made ten league appearances before returning to The Dell. It was not until the start of the 1975–76 season that Middleton was able to command a regular place in the first team. He played the first 17 matches of the season before "suffering a crisis of confidence" leading to the recall of Turner in November 1975. Saints went on to win the FA Cup with Turner in goal, defeating Manchester United in the final.

At the start of the 1976–77 season, Turner injured his knee and manager Lawrie McMenemy signed, first, Colin Boulton and then Jimmy Montgomery on loan, with Middleton making a few appearances before Peter Wells was signed from Nottingham Forest in December.

In May 1977, Middleton was released and joined Portsmouth. At the time he expressed his delight at joining his home-town club and criticised McMenemy's policy of signing ageing stars. His career at Pompey started well but after making a mistake in an FA Cup tie at Swansea City in December he conceded 12 goals in the next three league matches and was dropped. At the end of the season, he decided to retire from professional football.

== Later career ==
After retiring from football, he ran a public house in Portsmouth but in 2003 he was a financial advisor for a building society in Fareham.
