= Hugh Fisher (footballer) =

Scottish footballer (born 1944)

Personal information
- Full name: Hugh Donnelly Fisher
- Date of birth: 9 January 1944 (age 82)
- Place of birth: Pollok, Glasgow, Scotland
- Height: 5 ft 8 in (1.73 m)
- Position: Midfielder

Youth career
- Gowan Bank Youth Club

Senior career*
Years	Team	Apps	(Gls)
1962–1967	Blackpool	55	(1)
1967–1977	Southampton	302	(7)
1975	→ Denver Dynamos (loan)	22	(0)
1977–1978	Southport	60	(0)
1978–1979	Basingstoke Town		
1979	Andover		
1979–1980	Waterlooville		
Total		439	(8)

Managerial career
- 1977–1978: Southport (player-manager)
- * Club domestic league appearances and goals

Hugh Donnelly Fisher (born 9 January 1944) is a Scottish former professional footballer who played as a midfielder. He began his career at Blackpool before moving to Southampton in 1967. During his time with Southampton, he was a substitute in the 1976 FA Cup final.

After ten years at Southampton, he left to join Southport as player-manager before leaving when they left the Football League. Fisher continued to play semi-professional football before retiring in 1980.

== Career ==
=== Early career ===
Born in Pollok, Glasgow, Hugh Fisher is the son of another professional footballer Peter Fisher. He was playing for his local youth team when he was spotted by Blackpool and signed by them in August 1962, aged 18.

On 31 December 1966, he was part of the Blackpool side that defeated Southampton 5–1 at The Dell, and scored the opening goal. This was Blackpool's only away win of the 1966–67 season, in which they finished bottom with only 21 points and were relegated.

He played 55 League games in his five seasons at Blackpool, scoring once.

=== Southampton ===
After defeat by Blackpool, Southampton manager Ted Bates tried to sign a player to boost their midfield, having an offer of £75,000 for Howard Kendall rejected by Preston. He then turned his attention to Fisher, who had helped to rip Southampton apart on New Year's Eve, and he was signed for £35,000 at the beginning of March, making his debut (together with goalkeeper Eric Martin) on 18 March 1967 away to Everton (who by then had themselves signed Kendall). He made a good debut and remained ever-present to the end of the 1966–67 season when Saints narrowly avoided relegation in their first season in Division 1.

In 1967–68 he was the regular at No. 4, but the following season he lost his place to Fred Kemp. During the 1969–70 season, Fisher re-established himself and wore the number four shirt more often.

On 2 October 1971, he broke his leg in a collision with Arsenal's goalkeeper Bob Wilson, thus ending a sequence of 50 consecutive appearances. Fisher was then side-lined for the rest of the season, when again Saints struggled to avoid relegation. He was restored to the starting line-up the following season and barely missed a game over the next three seasons as Saints finally slipped back into Division 2 in 1974.

During the summer of 1975, he played in the United States with Denver Dynamos in the NASL.

His greatest moment in a Southampton shirt came in the 1975–76 season. The Saints were having a mediocre season in Division 2, but on 3 January 1976, in an FA Cup third round match at the Dell, Saints were 1–0 down against Aston Villa when, in the 89th minute of the game the ball fell to him on the edge of the area and he swung his left boot, with the ball flying into the corner of the net. This goal, Fisher's first for 16 months, kept his side in the competition.

Southampton progressed through the remaining rounds of the cup to reach the final. Fisher had played in all the rounds up to the semi-final, but had to withdraw from the starting line-up, in favour of Paul Gilchrist, with a pelvic strain. For both the semi-final and final on 1 May 1976 Fisher was on the bench, as Southampton went on to win their first trophy.

At the start of the following season, Fisher was still carrying the injury that had prevented him playing in the cup final, but he still appeared in most of the league games until 20 November 1976, when he played what was to be his last game for Southampton in a 3–1 home defeat by Bolton Wanderers. By this time, Steve Williams was beginning to make a name for himself in midfield and shortly afterwards Saints signed Fisher's former Blackpool teammate, Alan Ball. As the pairing of Ball and Williams became a virtual fixture in midfield, Fisher became a regular in the reserves, together with several other members of the team that had won the cup only a season earlier.

In all he had played 366 games for Southampton scoring 11 goals over ten years there.

=== Southport ===
In March 1977, after ten years with Southampton, Fisher joined Fourth Division Southport as player-manager. He played in Southport's remaining 15 games of the 1976–77 season, and only missed one game in the following season. Together with cup games, he made 66 appearances for Southport in a period of 14 months. However, his efforts were not enough to keep Southport in the Football League and they were not re-elected to the Fourth Division at the end of the 1977–78 season and were replaced by Wigan Athletic.

== After football ==
As a result of Southport leaving the Football League, Fisher was out of a job, although he played as a semi-professional for various Hampshire clubs, including a season with Waterlooville, but finally retired from football in 1980.

By this time, he was working as a sales representative for Schweppes before moving on to Watney Mann and then to Newcastle Courage.

== Honours ==
Southampton

- FA Cup: 1975–76
