= Alex Stepney =

English footballer (born 1942)

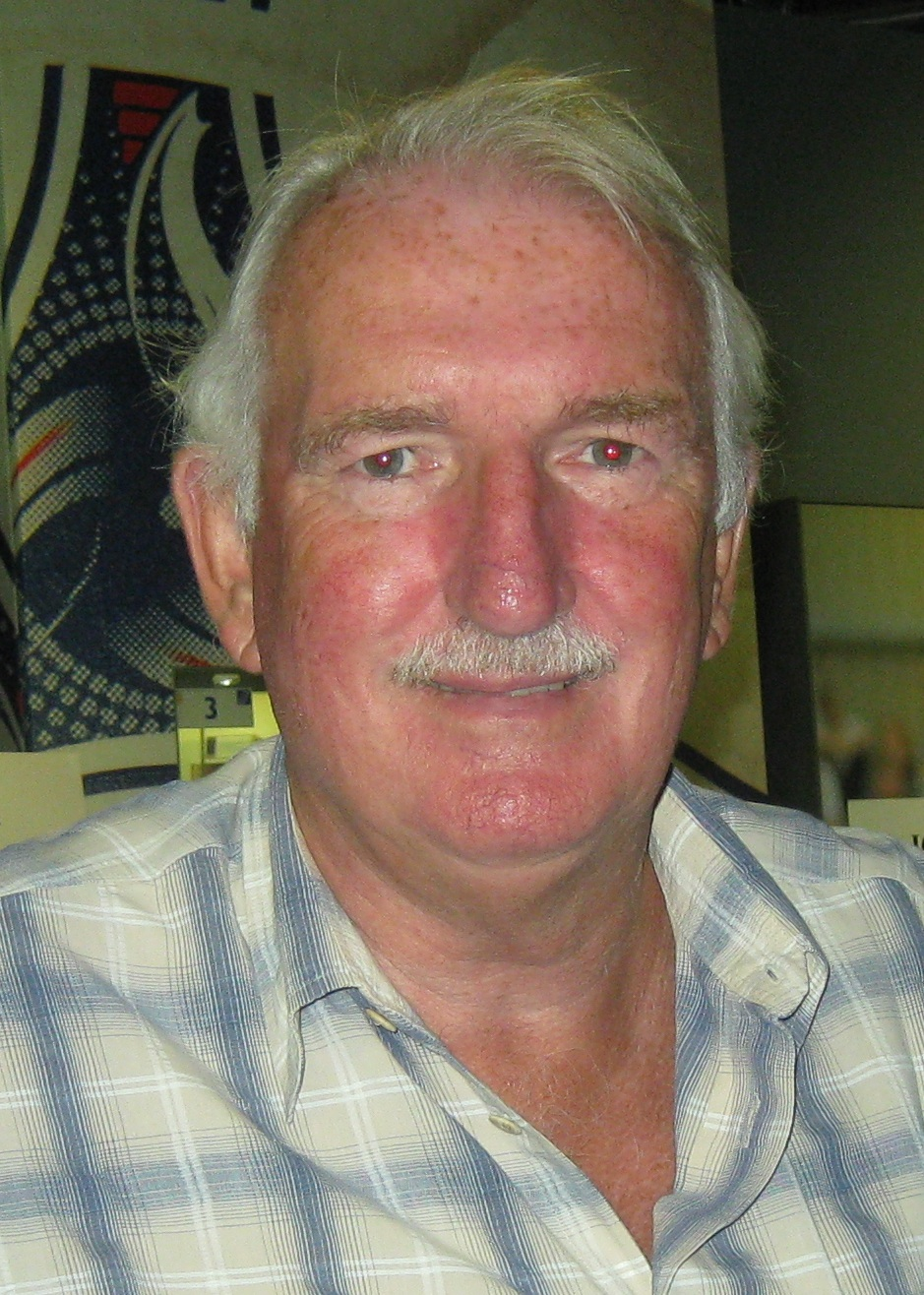
- Stepney in 2009

Personal information
- Full name: Alexander Cyril Stepney
- Date of birth: 18 September 1942 (age 84)
- Place of birth: Mitcham, Surrey, England
- Height: 1.80 m (5 ft 11 in)
- Position: Goalkeeper

Youth career
- Tooting & Mitcham United

Senior career*
Years	Team	Apps	(Gls)
1961–1963	Tooting & Mitcham United	35	(0)
1963–1966	Millwall	137	(0)
1966	Chelsea	1	(0)
1966–1978	Manchester United	433	(2)
1979–1980	Dallas Tornado	54	(0)
1979–1980	→ Altrincham (loan)	17	(0)
1981–1982	Altrincham	1	(0)
Total		678	(2)

International career
- England U23
1968	England	1	(0)
- * Club domestic league appearances and goals

Alexander Cyril Stepney (born 18 September 1942) is an English former footballer who was Manchester United's goalkeeper when they became the first English club to win the European Cup.

Stepney held the record for most appearances by a goalkeeper for Manchester United until May 2023, when he was surpassed by David de Gea.

== Early career ==
Born in Mitcham, Surrey, Stepney had unsuccessful trials with Fulham and joined Tooting & Mitcham United. From there, he was spotted by Millwall, who signed him as an amateur in 1963, but quickly realised his potential and made him a professional within two months of his arrival. Stepney was ever-present for almost three seasons, making 158 appearances, only missing the last game of the 1965–66 season. During this period, he earned three England under-23 caps.

In May 1966, Stepney joined Chelsea for £50,000. Manager Tommy Docherty initially intended to play Stepney and fellow goalkeeper Peter Bonetti in alternate weeks, but just three months later Stepney was sold to Manchester United for a record fee of £55,000, having made just one appearance for the club. With Harry Gregg's career virtually ended by injury, the Manchester United manager, Matt Busby, opted for Stepney after deciding that neither Pat Dunne nor the injury-prone David Gaskell was up to the job. Stepney made his debut for United later the same year against Manchester City at Old Trafford, and he kept a clean sheet as United won 1–0 through a first-half goal from Denis Law.

== League and European success ==
With Stepney in goal, Manchester United won the First Division title in 1967, earning them entry into the European Cup the following season, a competition that no English club had yet won. Stepney featured throughout United's progress to the final at Wembley Stadium, during which he made a memorable close-range save from Benfica striker Eusébio in the closing stages with the score at 1–1. Eusébio was so astonished at Stepney's save that he stopped to applaud the keeper as Stepney threw the ball back into play. United eventually won 4–1 after extra time.

At the start of that season, Stepney had conceded a goal to his opposite number at Tottenham Hotspur, Pat Jennings, in the 1967 FA Charity Shield at Old Trafford. With Tottenham leading 1–0, Jennings punted the ball upfield from the Stretford End; the ball bounced over the stranded Stepney into the net. The game ended 3–3 with United's goals coming from Bobby Charlton (2) and Denis Law.

== International recognition ==
Although a highly talented keeper, Stepney was a distance down the pecking order when it came to the England team. Gordon Banks was the undisputed number one, with Peter Bonetti of Chelsea, Gordon West of Everton and the more experienced Sheffield Wednesday goalkeeper Ron Springett all in Stepney's way. When England qualified for the final stages of the 1968 European Championships, coach Alf Ramsey selected Stepney and West as the two back-up keepers to Banks and, in what turned into a momentous week for Stepney, he made his England debut in a friendly win over Sweden in May 1968, seven days before the European Cup final. England won 3–1.

Ramsey kept Stepney in his thoughts in his preparations for England's defence of the FIFA World Cup in 1970, for which England did not have to qualify having won the previous tournament, but did not give him another cap as the likes of Bonetti and West added to their meagre tallies of appearances. However, when the preliminary squad of 27 was announced, Stepney was in, along with Banks, Bonetti and uncapped rookie Peter Shilton, with no sign of West. When the final 22 who would travel to Mexico was confirmed, Shilton was the goalkeeper sent home.

Nevertheless, Stepney was clearly the third-choice goalkeeper in the squad and the chances of his appearing on the pitch in Mexico were small. When Banks went down with food poisoning prior to the quarter-final with West Germany, it was the slightly more experienced Bonetti – who had six caps to Stepney's one – to whom Ramsey turned, although Stepney did make it onto the substitutes' bench. England squandered a two-goal lead to lose 3–2 and it was Stepney who told the groggy, ill Banks the scoreline in his hotel room by holding up three fingers on one hand and two on the other.

== Later Manchester United career ==
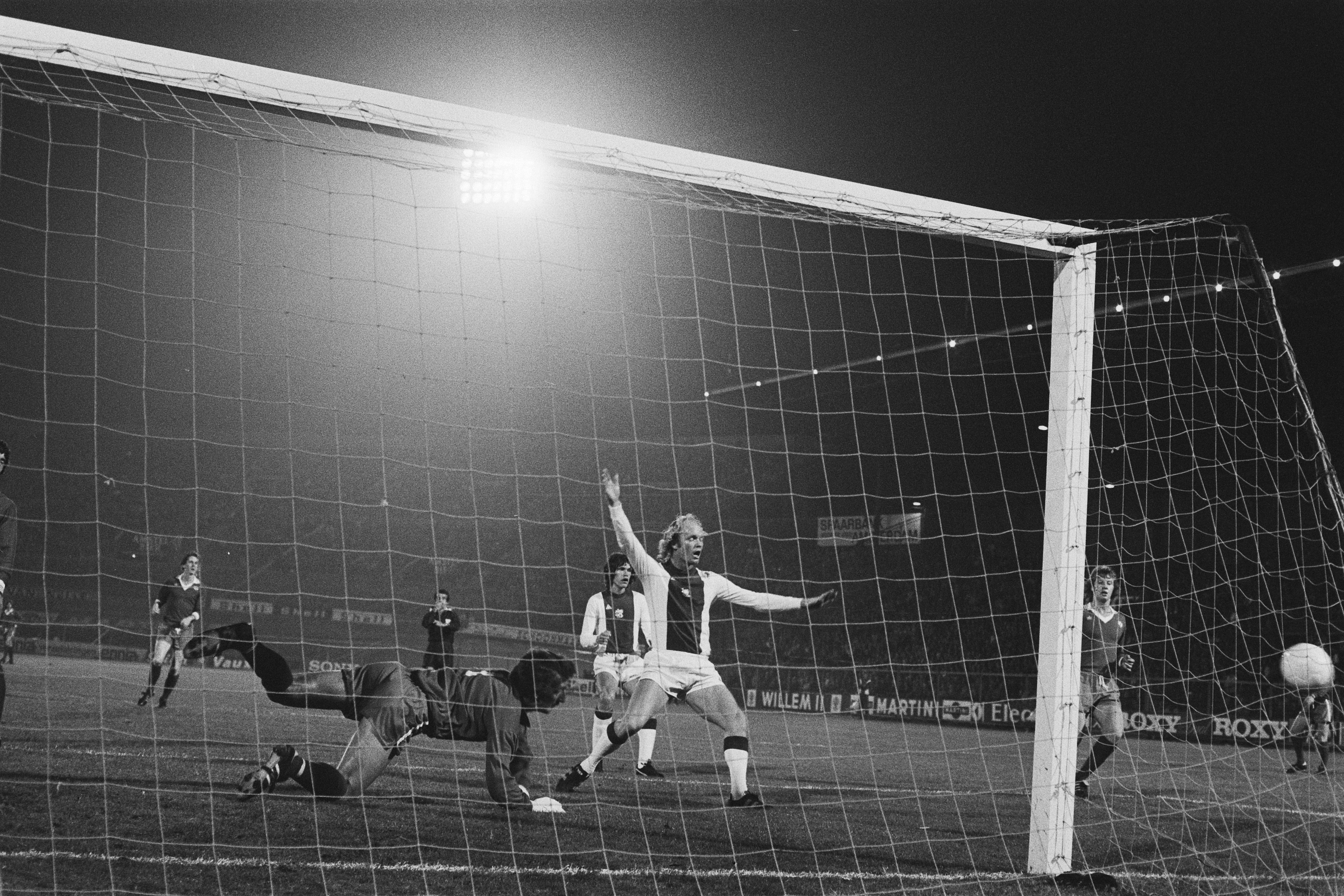
Stepney in goal for Manchester United in 1976 against Ajax

Stepney was occasionally recalled by Ramsey but would ultimately not add to his solitary England cap, with Shilton emerging as the new deputy and ultimate long-term replacement. He continued to play in goal for Manchester United in a period of significant underachievement for the club, which culminated in their relegation to the Second Division in 1974, a season which saw Stepney, unusually for a goalkeeper, score two goals from penalties thus making him the (joint) leading scorer at Christmas. For half a season he was replaced by Jimmy Rimmer. By now, with Stepney's former Chelsea manager Tommy Docherty in charge, they bounced back as Division Two champions the following season (1974–75). During this time, Stepney suffered a freak injury when he dislocated his jaw while barking instructions at his disorganised defence.

The next two seasons saw Stepney serve as the experienced presence in a Manchester United side assembled by Tommy Docherty through a combination of new signings and emerging academy players. During this period, he competed with Paddy Roche for the club's first-choice goalkeeper position. Stepney was the only member of the squad with previous club-level experience at Wembley when Manchester United reached the 1976 FA Cup Final. United were defeated 1–0 by Southampton, then a Second Division side, after Bobby Stokes scored the winning goal late in the match. Stepney was unable to prevent the decisive strike, which Manchester United players unsuccessfully claimed had been scored from an offside position.

United reached the cup final again in 1977, against Liverpool, and this time were successful. Stepney got a hand to a bullet shot on the turn from Jimmy Case but could not stop it entering the net and levelling the match after Stuart Pearson had scored for United. Jimmy Greenhoff quickly restored United's lead and Stepney made some good saves in the closing stages as Liverpool, chasing an unprecedented 'treble' of trophies (having already won the league title, and just days later going on to win the European Cup), piled on the pressure.

Stepney was the only player in the 1977 FA Cup-winning team remaining from the European Cup-winning side of nine years earlier. Stepney was also the last remaining player to play for the club under manager Matt Busby.

== Later career ==
The following year, Stepney was again not an automatic choice, playing 23 of United's 42 games in the league. He played the last of his 546 games for Manchester United in April 1978, prior to leaving for Dallas Tornado in the North American Soccer League in the United States, where he remained until he retired from professional football in 1980.

He kept 175 clean sheets, made a club record 92 consecutive appearances (later broken by Steve Coppell) and, with those two goals, remains United's top scoring goalkeeper. Aside from Peter Schmeichel (who scored in a 1995–96 UEFA Cup game), no other Manchester United goalkeeper has scored in a competitive game for the club after World War II.

Towards the end of his career, he turned out for non-league side Altrincham in the early 1980s, when they were competing in the Alliance Premier League. He helped them win the Alliance Premier League title in 1980–81 (they had won it the 1979–80 season as well), but they did not win promotion to the Football League as the re-election system was still in place and the majority of the league's members voted against them joining the Football League, ending Stepney's hopes of a professional comeback.

Stepney became a goalkeeping coach after he stopped playing, including a spell at Manchester City in 2000–01. He also works as an after-dinner speaker and used to host The Legends Football Phone in on 105.4 Century Radio in Manchester, replacing Mickey Thomas – another former Manchester United player.

== Style of play ==
Stepney was never a flashy performer and perhaps his most impressive quality was his positioning, although he could also demonstrate agility when required.

== Honours ==
Manchester United

- Football League First Division: 1966–67
- FA Cup: 1976–77; runner-up: 1975–76
- FA Charity Shield: 1967, 1977
- European Cup: 1967–68
