= Steve Heighway =

Irish footballer (born 1947)

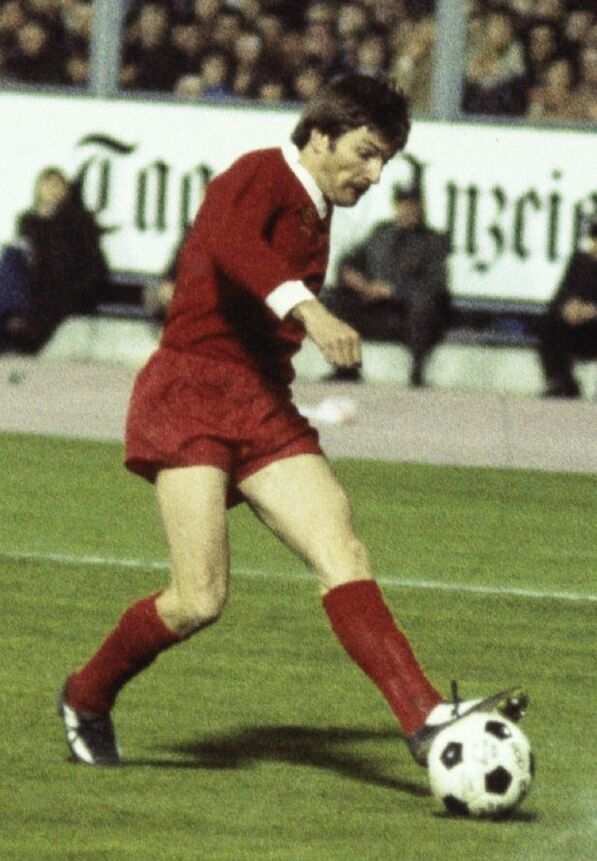
- Heighway playing for Liverpool in 1977

Personal information
- Full name: Stephen Derek Heighway
- Date of birth: 25 November 1947 (age 78)
- Place of birth: Dublin, Ireland
- Position: Winger

Youth career
- Skelmersdale United

Senior career*
Years	Team	Apps	(Gls)
1970–1981	Liverpool	444	(76)
1981	Minnesota Kicks	26	(19)
1981–1982	Philadelphia Fever (indoor)	23	(19)
Total		493	(122)

International career
1970–1981	Republic of Ireland	26	(0)
- * Club domestic league appearances and goals

Stephen Derek Heighway (born 25 November 1947) is an Irish former footballer who played as a winger. He was part of the successful Liverpool team of the 1970s. Following his eleven-year spell at the club, he was ranked 23rd in the 100 Players Who Shook The Kop poll. He has become immortalised in a Kop chant in recognition, for what the club's official site states, for having "dazzled audiences the length of the country."

Signed by Bill Shankly for Liverpool while a university student playing non-league football, Heighway won five English league championships, an FA Cup, a Football League Cup, two European Cups, two UEFA Cups, and a UEFA Super Cup. At international level he had 26 caps for the Republic of Ireland.

Heighway became academy director at Liverpool in a period when the club welcomed players including Steven Gerrard, Steve McManaman, Robbie Fowler, Jamie Carragher and Michael Owen. His teams won the FA Youth Cup three times. He retired in 2007 but later rejoined the Liverpool Academy in a consulting role, which he held until retiring again in 2022.

== Life and playing career ==
Heighway was born in Dublin, Ireland. His early education took place in Sheffield where he attended Ecclesall Junior School (until 1959), followed by High Storrs School and latterly Moseley Hall Grammar School for Boys in Cheadle, near Stockport.

Heighway's early promise as a winger was not spotted by professionals. Instead, he concentrated on his studies in economics and politics at the University of Warwick in Coventry (where he started in 1966) achieving a 2:1.

"The way I believe the game should be played is pure Shanks, the way I believe you should conduct yourself as an individual within the game is pure Shanks. So he had an enormous impact on me."

— Heighway on Bill Shankly who signed him for Liverpool when he was a university student.

In 1970, Heighway was studying for his final exams and playing for Skelmersdale United when he was spotted by Liverpool's scouting system. With manager Bill Shankly keen to rebuild his ageing, underachieving team of the 1960s, Heighway was signed up swiftly in May of that year. It was due to Heighway's academic achievements that he got his nickname 'Big Bamber', while teammate and fellow university graduate Brian Hall was dubbed 'Little Bamber' – both after the television programme University Challenge host Bamber Gascoigne.

A dynamic left winger with two good feet, Heighway settled into top flight football after making his debut on September 22, 1970, in a League Cup 2nd round replay at Anfield against Mansfield Town (3-2). Heighway opened his goalscoring account in the 51st minute of a 2–0 home league win over Burnley on October 1, 1970.

A month later, he scored against Merseyside rivals Everton in a hard-fought 3–2 win, after his team had found themselves 2–0 down not long into the second half. He stayed in the side for the rest of the season as Liverpool's new charges finished the league campaign strongly and also defeated Everton in the semi-finals of the FA Cup to reach the final at Wembley.

Their opponents were Arsenal, who were after a coveted "double" having won the League championship. Heighway played confidently in a match that was goalless after 90 minutes and therefore needed a period of extra-time. Just two minutes into the added half-hour, Heighway received the ball wide on his left flank from substitute Peter Thompson and started a run towards the Arsenal penalty area, with Gunners full back Pat Rice tracking his run but unwilling to put in a tackle. With a swift turn outside Heighway gained a yard on Rice and hit a low drive into the net past Arsenal goalkeeper Bob Wilson, who had committed the cardinal goalkeeping sin of coming out too far from his near post to anticipate a cross, thereby leaving a gap that Heighway exploited. Sadly for Heighway and Liverpool, their opponents scored two goals in response.

Heighway settled into the Liverpool team for the next decade, winning the first of four League titles in 1973, along with the UEFA Cup. He returned to Wembley for another FA Cup final a year later as Liverpool faced Newcastle United. Heighway scored again with 16 minutes of the game remaining to make the score 2–0, latching on to a flick from John Toshack after a long clearance from goalkeeper Ray Clemence to slot a right-footed shot into the far corner. The game ended 3–0.

By now, Heighway was a regular for the Republic of Ireland making his debut on 23 September 1970 against Poland. He remained so for the whole of the 1970s, winning a total of 34 caps but never managing to score. He did have a goal disallowed in a qualifier for the 1978 World Cup against Bulgaria in Sofia. On the domestic front, Heighway attained another League and UEFA Cup double with Liverpool in 1976 and then formed part of the side which came so close to the "treble" of League, FA Cup and European Cup.

Liverpool won the League by a single point and again defeated rivals Everton in the semi-final to reach the FA Cup final, this time to face bitter rivals Manchester United at Wembley. Liverpool lost 2–1 and the "treble" dream was dead.

Heighway scored his first goal of the 1977 European Cup in a 5–0 first round second leg win over Crusaders. He then scored in a 3–0 second round win against Trabzonspor and in the 3–1 semi-final first leg win over Zurich. Liverpool beat Borussia Mönchengladbach 3–1 to win their first European Cup, with Heighway setting up both outfield goals for Terry McDermott, a defence-splitting pass, and Tommy Smith, a corner.

In 1978, Heighway was on the bench as Liverpool retained the European Cup with a 1–0 victory over FC Bruges at Wembley, coming on as a substitute for Jimmy Case. The following year he was again in the side frequently as Liverpool won another League title, but from 1980 onwards his opportunities in the side diminished.

Heighway stayed for two more seasons, appearing only occasionally in the team and missing out on two more League title medals, another European Cup triumph and a first League Cup medal, which was successfully defended a year later. He left Anfield in 1982 after 444 matches and 76 goals.

Heighway then prolonged his career with a move to the US, joining Minnesota Kicks for the 1981 season. He played 26 games, scoring four goals. He then joined the coaching staff of Umbro, which led to a position with the Clearwater Chargers where he pioneered the role of director of coaching in the United States. In 1989 he was asked to rejoin Liverpool to run their youth academy, bringing promising youngsters up through the system until they were ready for the professional game. Among Heighway's successes were Steve McManaman, Robbie Fowler, Steven Gerrard, Jamie Carragher, Dominic Matteo, David Thompson and Michael Owen.

On 4 September 2006, a poll on Liverpool's official web site named Heighway 23rd out of 100 Players Who Shook The Kop.

Heighway announced his retirement from Liverpool on 26 April 2007, immediately after the side he managed won the FA Youth Cup for the second year running. He commented: "I don't know what the future holds just yet, we'll have to wait and see."

Heighway returned to working at Liverpool's Academy part-time in 2015, at the request of Academy Director Alex Inglethorpe, before taking up a full-time consultancy role later that year. After seven years in this position, he retired for a second time in December 2022.

Heighway also features in the popular Liverpool chant, "The Fields of Anfield Road", which is frequently sung by Liverpool fans during matches.

== Honours ==
=== As a player ===
- Football League First Division: 1972–73, 1975–76, 1976–77, 1978–79, 1979–80
- FA Cup: 1973–74; runner-up: 1970–71, 1976–77
- Football League Cup: 1980–81; runner-up: 1977–78
- FA Charity Shield: 1974, 1976, 1977 (shared), 1979
- European Cup: 1976–77, 1977–78
- UEFA Cup: 1972–73, 1975–76
- UEFA Super Cup: 1977

=== As Academy Director ===
- FA Youth Cup: 1996, 2006, 2007
