= Jim McCalliog =

Scottish footballer (born 1946)

Personal information
- Full name: James McCalliog
- Date of birth: 23 September 1946 (age 80)
- Place of birth: Glasgow, Scotland
- Height: 5 ft 9 in (1.75 m)
- Position: Midfielder

Youth career
- 1963: Leeds United

Senior career*
Years	Team	Apps	(Gls)
1963–1965	Chelsea	7	(2)
1965–1969	Sheffield Wednesday	150	(19)
1969–1974	Wolverhampton Wanderers	163	(34)
1974–1975	Manchester United	31	(7)
1975–1977	Southampton	72	(8)
1977	Chicago Sting	19	(0)
1978	SFK Lyn	2	(0)
1978–1979	Lincoln City	9	(0)
1979	Runcorn		
Total		453	(70)

International career
1966–1967	Scotland U23	2	(3)
1967–1971	Scotland	10	(1)

Managerial career
- 1979: Runcorn (player-manager)
- 1990–1991: Halifax Town
- * Club domestic league appearances and goals

James McCalliog (born 23 September 1946) is a Scottish former football player and coach. He played in the Football League for Chelsea, Sheffield Wednesday, Wolverhampton Wanderers, Manchester United, Southampton and Lincoln City, as well as in the United States with Chicago Sting and in Norway with Lyn and Sarpsborg Fotball Klubb (SFK).

He appeared for Sheffield Wednesday in the 1966 FA Cup Final, scoring one of the goals for the Owls in a 3–2 defeat by Everton. Ten years later, he played for Southampton in their 1976 FA Cup Final win against his former club Manchester United; McCalliog provided the assist for Bobby Stokes to score the only goal.

McCalliog also won ten caps for Scotland between 1967 and 1971. He scored the third goal in Scotland's 3–2 win against England at Wembley in 1967.

== Club career ==
McCalliog was selected to play for Glasgow Schools, before signing as an amateur with Leeds United in May 1963. However, he remained on the books of the West Yorkshire club for just four months before joining Chelsea in September 1963.

He made his senior debut on his 18th birthday in a 3–0 League Cup win at Birmingham City, but managed just seven league appearances over a two-year stay. His only goals for Chelsea came on 21 November 1964, when he scored twice at Birmingham in a 6–1 victory. However, his potential was noted and, in October 1965, he transferred to Sheffield Wednesday for a then-record fee for a teenager of £37,500.

His first season at Hillsborough saw him help the club to the FA Cup Final with a goal in their 2–0 semi-final victory over Chelsea at Villa Park. He scored again in the final against Everton, with the opening goal in the fourth minute as his team took a 2–0 lead. However, Everton mounted one of the greatest comebacks in FA Cup final history, and eventually ran out 3–2 winners.

After almost four seasons and 174 appearances for the Owls, McCalliog moved on to fellow top-flight side Wolverhampton Wanderers for £70,000, where he was virtual ever-present over the next three seasons. He played in the club's run to the 1972 UEFA Cup Final, scoring a vital away goal against Juventus en route. In the final, a two-legged match against Tottenham Hotspur, he scored Wolves' only goal in a 2–1 first leg defeat at home, he also captained the team in both legs, in the absence of Mike Bailey. The second leg ended a 1–1 draw, leaving McCalliog with a runners-up medal.

The 1973–74 season saw his appearances hampered by injuries and he did not win his place back for Wolves' League Cup win over Manchester City; Alan Sunderland taking his spot. Days later, on deadline day in March 1974, he left Wolves to join Manchester United for £60,000.

United were then struggling near the foot of the First Division, and although McCalliog soon made his mark with three goals in three wins, the club were relegated at the end of the season. He played enough games in the following season to win a Second Division championship medal but had been sold by manager Tommy Docherty before the season's end to Southampton for £40,000.

He made his Southampton debut away to Oldham on 15 February 1975 and appeared 14 times that season. The following season (1975–76) he made 37 league appearances, scoring 7 goals, as Southampton laboured away in the Second Division.

Their league campaign was overshadowed though by a run to that year's FA Cup Final, during which McCalliog scored at Aston Villa and Bradford in the early rounds. He gained the first winners' medal of his career as he supplied the through-ball for Bobby Stokes to hit the winner against favourites Manchester United.

The following season saw manager Lawrie McMenemy start to dismantle the cup-winning team and McCalliog was released at the end of the season, having lost his place in the first team to Alan Ball in January. He moved to the United States to ply his trade with the Chicago Sting, before a brief spell as player-coach with SFK Lyn in Norway.

He returned to Britain in September 1978, as a player-coach at Lincoln City but soon fell out with manager Colin Murphy and his contract was paid up early in 1979. He briefly moved on to non-league Runcorn as player/manager, before quitting football, and taking over a pub in Lytham St. Anne's in 1979.

In March 1990, he was combining the job of publican with that of community officer in North Yorkshire when Halifax Town parted company with manager Billy Ayre, and he was asked to step into the breach. However, his spell with Halifax was not successful, as they hovered around the foot of the Football League, and he resigned in October 1991 to be succeeded by John McGrath. McCalliog has not held a senior position in football since.

== International career ==
McCalliog represented Scotland at schoolboy, youth and under-23 levels. On his Scotland debut he scored the third goal in Scotland's 3–2 win over 1966 FIFA World Cup winners England at Wembley. Speaking in 2014, Scotland manager Bobby Brown said that McCalliog had been the "crux" of the team. McCalliog played in five games during a 1967 overseas tour that the Scottish Football Association decided in October 2021 to reclassify as full internationals, which increased his cap tally from five to ten.

== Life after football ==
After leaving Halifax, he settled with his second wife in Yorkshire where they ran the George & Dragon pub at Wetherby. After another divorce at the end of 2005, he was running a pub in Leeds. He later took over a pub in Fenwick, Ayrshire, close to his native Glasgow but left this establishment around 2010 and now runs a bed and breakfast in Fenwick, Ayrshire with his present wife Debbie.

== Honours ==
Sheffield Wednesday

- FA Cup runner-up: 1965–66

Wolverhampton Wanderers

- Texaco Cup: 1970–71
- UEFA Cup runner-up: 1971–72

Southampton

- FA Cup: 1975–76
