= 1981–82 Brighton & Hove Albion F.C. season =

1981–82 season of Brighton & Hove Albion

Brighton & Hove Albion F.C.
1981–82 season
- Chairman: Mike Bamber
- Manager: Mike Bailey
- Stadium: Goldstone Ground
- First Division: 13th
- FA Cup: Fourth round
- League Cup: Third round
- Top goalscorer: League: All: Andy Ritchie (14)
Home colours

During the 1981–82 English football season, Brighton & Hove Albion competed in the Football League First Division.

== Season summary ==
Brighton achieved their highest-ever league finish of 13th.

In the FA Cup, Brighton were knocked out at home in the Fourth round by Oxford United of the Third Division, 59 places lower in the league, who won 3-0. Following the defeat, an advert appeared in the Evening Argus "For sale, eleven clockwork clowns. Some work better than others."

Three days later, Brighton earned their first ever point against Arsenal in a 0-0 draw at Highbury.

On 6 March 1982, the Seagulls also scored an impressive clean-sheet win at Anfield, winning 1-0 against the eventual Champions Liverpool (the champions' final league loss of the season).

== Kit ==
Brighton's kit was manufactured by Adidas and sponsored by British Caledonian.

== Results ==
Brighton & Hove Albion's score comes first

=== Legend ===
Win	Draw	Loss

=== First Division ===
Pos	Team	Pld	W	D	L	GF	GA	GD	Pts	Qualification or relegation
11	Aston Villa	42	15	12	15	55	53	+2	57	Qualification for the European Cup first round (Note: Aston Villa qualified for the European Cup first round as the 1981–82 European Cup winners.)
12	Nottingham Forest	42	15	12	15	42	48	−6	57	
13	Brighton & Hove Albion	42	13	13	16	43	52	−9	52	
14	Coventry City	42	13	11	18	56	62	−6	50	
15	Notts County	42	13	8	21	61	69	−8	47	

Source: World Football
Rules for classification: 1) Points; 2) Goal difference; 3) Goals scored

== Squad ==
Note: Flags indicate national team as defined under FIFA eligibility rules; some limited exceptions apply. Players may hold more than one non-FIFA nationality.

Pos.	Nation	Player
GK	ENG	Graham Moseley
DF	ENG	Steve Foster
DF	ENG	Steve Gatting (captain)
DF	ENG	Graham Pearce
DF	ENG	Chris Ramsey
DF	ENG	Gary Stevens
DF	NIR	Sammy Nelson
DF	IRL	Gerry Ryan

Pos.	Nation	Player
MF	ENG	Jimmy Case
MF	WAL	Mickey Thomas
MF	IRL	Tony Grealish
MF	IRL	Gary Howlett
FW	ENG	Andy Ritchie
FW	SCO	Gordon Smith
FW	IRL	Michael Robinson

== Transfers ==
=== In ===
- (England) Steve Gatting - (England) Arsenal, July
- (Republic of Ireland) Tony Grealish - (England) Luton Town, July
- (Northern Ireland) Sammy Nelson - (England) Arsenal, October
- (Wales) Mickey Thomas - (England) Everton, January

=== Out ===
- (Israel) Moshe Gariani - (Israel) Maccabi Netanya, June
- (England) Brian Horton - (England) Luton Town, June
- (Republic of Ireland) Mark Lawrenson - (England) Liverpool, June
- (Wales) Peter O'Sullivan - (England) Fulham, June
- (Wales) John Phillips - (England) Charlton Athletic, June
