= Jimmy Case =

English footballer and manager (born 1954)

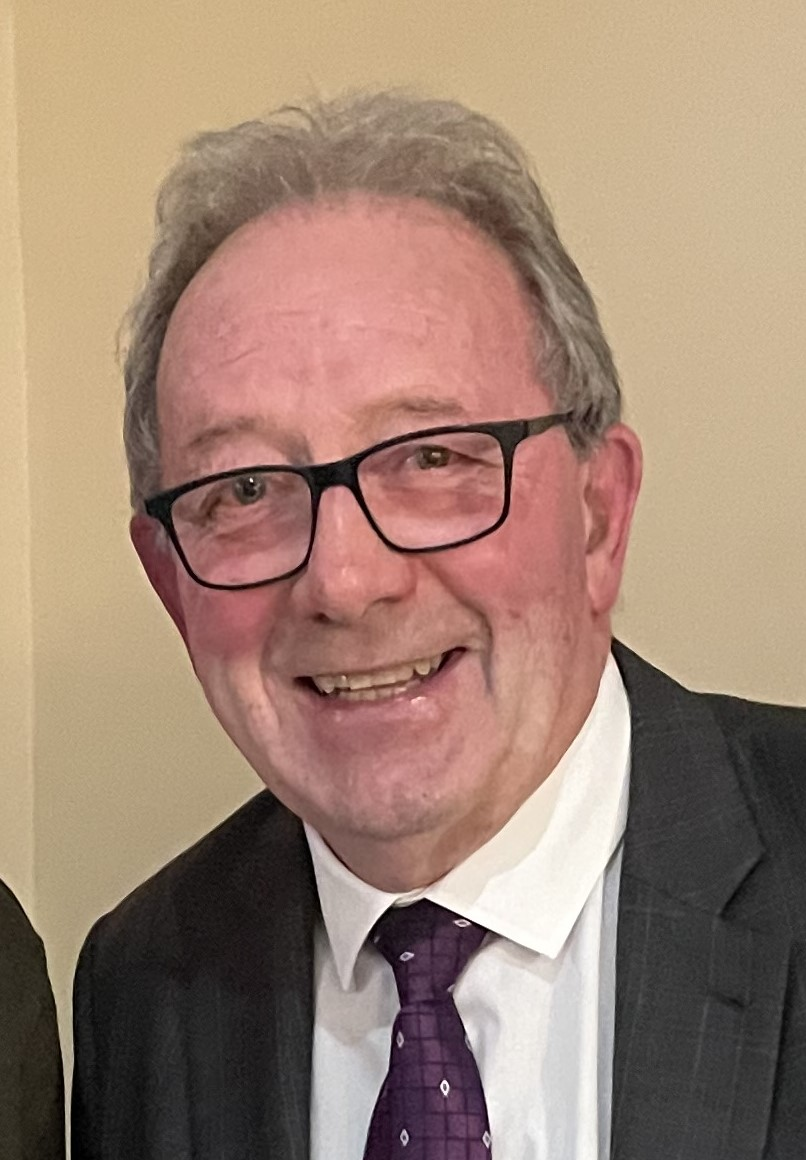
- Case in 2024

Personal information
- Full name: James Robert Case
- Date of birth: 18 May 1954 (age 72)
- Place of birth: Liverpool, England
- Height: 5 ft 9 in (1.75 m)
- Position: Midfielder

Youth career
- South Liverpool

Senior career*
Years	Team	Apps	(Gls)
1973–1981	Liverpool	186	(23)
1981–1985	Brighton & Hove Albion	127	(10)
1985–1991	Southampton	215	(10)
1991–1992	AFC Bournemouth	40	(1)
1992–1993	Halifax Town	21	(2)
1993	Wrexham	4	(0)
1993	Wanneroo British	?	(?)
1993	Darlington	1	(0)
1993	Sittingbourne	5	(0)
1993–1996	Brighton & Hove Albion	32	(0)
1997–1998	Bashley	6	(0)
Total		637	(46)

International career
1976	England U23	1	(1)

Managerial career
- 1995–1996: Brighton & Hove Albion
- 1997–1999: Bashley
- * Club domestic league appearances and goals

James Robert Case (born 18 May 1954) is an English retired professional footballer who played as a midfielder. He gained national prominence with Liverpool in the 1970s and early 1980s.

== Early life ==
Case was brought up in Allerton and was a distant neighbour of musician Paul McCartney on the council estate which had been built in the interwar years.

Case was also training to become an electrician, working all day but training with Liverpool two mornings and two nights a week.

== Playing career ==
=== Liverpool ===
Case arrived at Anfield from local non-league club South Liverpool in May 1973 and was given his debut on 26 April 1975 in a league fixture at Anfield against Queens Park Rangers; goals from John Toshack (2), and Kevin Keegan made it a winning start for Case as the Reds won 3–1. By 1976 he was a first-choice midfielder who was a prolific goalscorer for someone in his position; his first goal for the club came in the 68th minute of the 3–2 league win over Tottenham Hotspur at Anfield on 23 August 1975. At the end of his first full season, he helped Liverpool to victory in the League championship and the UEFA Cup, scoring in the first leg of the final of the latter against FC Bruges.

Case maintained his place the following year (1976–77) as Liverpool chased a unique treble of League Championship, FA Cup and European Cup. They were league champions for the second season in a row, but lost in the 1977 FA Cup Final to Manchester United 2–1. Case was the scorer of Liverpool's goal shortly after their opponents had taken the lead; it was a typical Case goal, a thundering shot from outside the penalty area following a neat turn on the ball. He was in the team again a few days later when Liverpool won the 1977 European Cup Final, beating Borussia Mönchengladbach 3–1 in Rome.

Case won both the League (1978–79, 1979–80) and the European Cup twice more (1978 against Club Brugge in the final, 1981 against Real Madrid) with Liverpool, and added a League Cup winners' medal in 1981 (against West Ham United in the final), but in that season he found himself out of favour. Manager Bob Paisley was concerned by Case's close friendship with fellow midfielder Ray Kennedy, with the two regularly embroiled in off-the-pitch escapades—culminating in their both being charged with assault in the spring of 1980—and with the emergence of Sammy Lee on the right side of midfield, made the difficult decision to offload Case. Paisley transferred him to Brighton & Hove Albion in the summer of 1981.

Case was voted No. 45 in the 2006 poll 100 Players Who Shook The Kop taken by the Official Liverpool Football Club website in which over 110,000 fans worldwide nominated their personal Top 10 players.

=== Brighton ===
Case joined Brighton in August 1981 as a £450,000 makeweight when Mark Lawrenson went the other way and he played a large part in the success achieved at the Goldstone Ground in the early 1980s.

With Brighton, Case scored the winning goal at Anfield in the 5th round of the 1983 FA Cup, also scoring in the quarter and semi finals as the Albion reached the final for the only time to date. The game ended 2–2 with Brighton passing up a great opportunity to win the cup when Gordon Smith hit a shot directly at United keeper Gary Bailey, who pulled off a spectacular save. Brighton's chance of glory had gone, and they were crushed 4–0 in the replay. They had already been relegated from the First Division in bottom place. In spite of this setback, Case remained at the Goldstone Ground for nearly two years after the Seagulls were relegated, including a further FA Cup victory over Liverpool in January 1984.

=== Southampton ===
In March 1985, Case moved to Southampton for a nominal fee of £30,000 as Lawrie McMenemy's last signing for The Saints, to replace Steve Williams, who had been transferred to Arsenal in December 1984. He soon won over any doubters amongst The Dell fans with some robust tackling. In his first few weeks at the club, they finished fifth in the league, but were then denied UEFA Cup qualification due to the subsequent ban on English clubs in European competitions, which followed the Heysel Disaster that year.

When McMenemy quit after the end of the season, Case was appointed club captain by new manager Chris Nicholl.

In his first full season, Saints reached the semi-final of the FA Cup (after beating Case's former club Brighton 2–0 in the quarter-final) losing to Liverpool in an epic game at White Hart Lane on 5 April 1986, which Liverpool won 2–0 after extra time with both goals coming from Ian Rush. Victory would have made Case the first player to appear in three FA Cup finals with different clubs.

Over his six years at The Dell, Case lost none of his bite in the tackle and he made up for any loss of pace by a broadening vision and excellent passing skills. Even in his mid thirties, he was still among the most highly regarded midfielders in the First Division.

He was Saints player of the year for 1989–90 and in December 1990 was selected to represent the Football League against the Irish League. In this season Saints finished seventh in the First Division and Saints were playing at close to their best. One particularly memorable match was on 21 October 1989, when Saints defeated Liverpool 4–1, with goals from Paul Rideout, Rod Wallace (2) and Matthew Le Tissier in which Case controlled the midfield as The Saints humiliated Case's former club. During his time at The Dell, however, he did not add any major trophies to his list of honours won at Liverpool.

Case played in midfield alongside Glenn Cockerill and Barry Horne and helped to bring on the careers of exciting young players such as Le Tissier, Alan Shearer, Rod Wallace and Jason Dodd. Ian Branfoot succeeded Nicholl as manager in June 1991, and considered that the club could dispense with Case's services and he was transferred to AFC Bournemouth within a few days of Branfoot's appointment, a decision that proved very unpopular with the Saints fans, especially when Case was replaced by the unsuccessful Terry Hurlock, and was one of the key reasons that Branfoot was an unpopular figure with the club's supporters during his two and a half years in charge.

=== AFC Bournemouth, Halifax Town, Wrexham & Brighton again ===
He moved on to join Harry Redknapp at Bournemouth and managed to play 40 league games in the 1991–92 season, and was playing in the Third Division for the first time in his whole career.

After a season at Bournemouth, he moved to Halifax Town managed by John McGrath assisted by Frank Worthington. He played there for 6 months, before moving on to Wrexham, where he helped them gain promotion from Division Three at the end of the 1992–93 season, while Halifax fell into the GM Vauxhall Conference.

He then turned out for non-league side Sittingbourne until returning to Brighton in December 1993, firstly as a player/coach before taking over from Liam Brady as manager in November 1995. He was still playing that season, and at the age of 41 was the oldest outfield player registered with any Premier League or Football League club at the time. 46-year-old goalkeeper Peter Shilton (with Coventry City and West Ham United) was the only senior player older than Case at this time, and Shilton's failure to make any competitive appearances that campaign meant that Case was the oldest "active" senior player in England during the season.

He finally announced his retirement from playing on 10 November 1995.

== Career statistics ==
Appearances and goals by club, season and competition
Club	Season	League			FA Cup		League Cup		Europe		Other		Total	
Club	Season	Division	Apps	Goals	Apps	Goals	Apps	Goals	Apps	Goals	Apps	Goals	Apps	Goals
Liverpool
Liverpool	1974–75	First Division	1	0	0	0	0	0	0	0	—		1	0
Liverpool	1975–76	First Division	27	6	2	0	1	1	9 (Note: Appearances in UEFA Cup)	5	—		39	12
Liverpool	1976–77	First Division	27	1	7	4	1	0	6 (Note: Appearances in European Cup)	2	1 (Note: Appearances in Charity Shield)	0	42	7
Liverpool	1977–78	First Division	33	5	0	0	8	2	9 (Note: Appearances in European Cup (7 appearances, 4 goals) and Super Cup (2 appearances))	4	1	0	51	11
Liverpool	1978–79	First Division	37	7	6	1	1	0	4 (Note: Appearances in European Cup (2 appearances) and Super Cup (2 appearances, 1 goal))	1	—		48	9
Liverpool	1979–80	First Division	37	3	5	1	7	0	2	1	1	0	52	5
Liverpool	1980–81	First Division	24	1	2	1	4	0	5	0	1	0	36	2
Liverpool	Total		186	23	22	7	22	3	35	13	4	0	269	46
Brighton & Hove Albion
Brighton & Hove Albion	1981–82	First Division	33	3	2	1	3	0	—		—		38	4
Brighton & Hove Albion	1982–83	First Division	35	3	8	4	1	0	—		—		44	7
Brighton & Hove Albion	1983–84	Second Division	35	4	2	0	2	0	—		—		39	4
Brighton & Hove Albion	1984–85	Second Division	24	0	2	0	2	0	—		—		28	0
Brighton & Hove Albion	Total		127	10	14	5	8	0	0	0	0	0	149	15
Southampton
Southampton	1984–85	First Division	10	1	0	0	0	0	—		—		10	1
Southampton	1985–86	First Division	36	2	6	0	6	0	—		2 (Note: Appearances in ScreenSport Super Cup)	0	50	2
Southampton	1986–87	First Division	39	3	0	0	8	1	—		2 (Note: Appearances in Full Members' Cup)	1	49	5
Southampton	1987–88	First Division	38	0	1	0	2	0	—		—		41	0
Southampton	1988–89	First Division	34	0	2	0	7	1	—		2	0	45	1
Southampton	1989–90	First Division	33	3	3	0	7	0	—		—		43	3
Southampton	1990–91	First Division	25	1	3	1	4	0	—		—		32	2
Southampton	Total		215	10	15	1	34	2	0	0	6	1	270	14
Bournemouth	1991–92	Third Division	40	1	5	0	3	0	—		2 (Note: Appearances in EFL Trophy)	1	50	2
Halifax Town	1992–93	Third Division	21	2	1	0	1	0	—		—		23	2
Wrexham	1992–93	Third Division	4	0	0	0	0	0	—		—		4	0
Darlington	1993–94	Third Division	1	0	0	0	0	0	—		—		1	0
Sittingbourne	1993–94	Southern Premier Division	5	0	0	0	0	0	—		—		5	0
Brighton & Hove Albion
Brighton & Hove Albion	1993–94	Second Division	21	0	0	0	0	0	—		—		21	0
Brighton & Hove Albion	1994–95	Second Division	9	0	0	0	2	0	—		—		11	0
Brighton & Hove Albion	1995–96	Second Division	2	0	0	0	0	0	—		—		2	0
Brighton & Hove Albion	Total		32	0	0	0	2	0	0	0	0	0	34	0
Bashley	1997–98	Southern Premier South	6	0	0	0	0	0	—		3 (Note: Appearances in FA Trophy (2 appearances) and Hampshire Senior Cup (1 appearance))	0	9	0
Career total			637	46	57	13	70	5	35	13	15	1	814	78

== Honours ==
Liverpool

- Football League First Division: 1975–76, 1976–77, 1978–79, 1979–80
- Football League Cup: 1980–81; runner-up: 1977–78
- FA Charity Shield: 1976, 1977, 1979, 1980
- European Cup: 1976–77, 1977–78, 1980–81
- UEFA Cup: 1975–76
- European Super Cup: 1977
- FA Cup runner-up: 1976–77

Brighton & Hove Albion

- FA Cup runner-up: 1982–83

Individual

- Bravo Award: 1978
