= Brian Kettle =

English footballer (born 1956)

Personal information
- Date of birth: 22 April 1956 (age 70)
- Place of birth: Prescot, England
- Position: Left-back

Senior career*
Years	Team	Apps	(Gls)
1973–1980	Liverpool	3	(0)
1978	→ Dallas Tornado (loan)	19	(1)
1978–1979	→ Houston Hurricane (loan)		
1980–1981	Wigan Athletic	14	(1)
- Burscough
- Barrow

International career
- England Youth

Managerial career
- South Liverpool
- 1989–1995: Southport
- 1995–1996: Northwich Victoria
- Stalybridge Celtic
- Rhyl
- * Club domestic league appearances and goals

Brian Kettle (born 22 April 1956) is an English former footballer who played as a left-back.

Kettle began his career with Liverpool, signing professional forms in 1973. He was to remain at Anfield for seven years, but could never rise above reserve level. He was very successful in the reserve team, however, captaining the side for many years, as it won five Central League titles, and three Liverpool Senior Cups. He could never break into the first-team, however, only making four appearances before departing in 1980. He then signed for Wigan Athletic, but was released after one year following a career ending ACL injury after a bad tackle. Having been forced into dropping into non league football with Burscough and Barrow. He later moved into management, taking charge of South Liverpool, Southport, Stalybridge Celtic and Rhyl. In July 2010 Kettle joined A.F.C. Liverpool as assistant reserve team manager.

== Managerial career ==
=== Southport ===
After several seasons with South Liverpool, Kettle was appointed manager at Southport, and was instrumental in one of the most successful periods at Haig Avenue. After three seasons the Kettle's team were showing real promise. Cup finals and victories in them soon followed, however league performance ultimately suffered finishing 7th, 5th and 7th again.

The 1992–93 season was one of the most important seasons in the clubs recent history. Southport impressively won the league with 96 points and once again scoring 100 goals and tasted success in two more cup competitions and an excellent FA Cup run took them through to the second round proper for the first time since 1968. After proving the ground was up to scratch the club were duly promoted back to the top flight of non-league football the Vauxhall Conference.

After a promising first season which saw the club finish fourth and only nine points off champions Kidderminster Harries followed by another a Kettle shocked the town with his resignation in March 1995 citing personal reasons with Billy Ayre appointed to oversee and cement the third-place finish.
