= Peter McDonnell (footballer) =

English footballer (born 1953)

Personal information
- Date of birth: 11 June 1953 (age 73)
- Place of birth: Kendal, England
- Position: Goalkeeper

Senior career*
Years	Team	Apps	(Gls)
1971–1973	Netherfield		
1973–1974	Bury	1	(0)
1974–1978	Liverpool	0	(0)
1978–1982	Oldham Athletic	137	(0)
1978	→ Dallas Tornado (loan)	9	(0)
1982–1985	Hong Kong Rangers		
1985	Barrow		
1985–1986	Morecambe		
1986–1992	Barrow		
Total		147	(0)
- * Club domestic league appearances and goals

Peter McDonnell (born 11 June 1953) is an English former professional footballer who played as a goalkeeper in England, the United States and Hong Kong.

== Career ==
McDonnell was born Kendal, Westmorland, England. He began his professional career in 1973 with Bury, before being signed by Liverpool boss Bill Shankly after one year. He spent four years as reserve goalkeeper at Anfield, without making a first-team appearance. There were no substitute goalkeepers in domestic football in those days, and so McDonnell's only first-team squad involvement came in European football.

He was on the bench for the 1977 European Cup Final, a game which Liverpool won. However, McDonnell's winner's medal was lost after the game, believed by some to have been stolen and given to one of Liverpool's first-team players who had missed the final. Following the arrival of Steve Ogrizovic, he was pushed down to third choice, and left to join Oldham Athletic in 1978.

He spent four years there, before heading to Dallas in the NASL, then to Hong Kong to play for Hong Kong Rangers, eventually returning home to represent a number of non-league clubs. He spent some time at Barrow in the Northern Premier League, and later the Football Conference and won the FA Trophy at Wembley Stadium in 1990.

== Personal life ==
McDonnell is a referee in the North Lancashire and District Football League and is a Westmorland Football Association council member.

== Honours ==
- European Cup: 1976–77
- UEFA Cup: 1975–76
- FA Charity Shield: 1974, 1976, 1977
- European Super Cup: 1977
