= Peter Fisher (1930s footballer) =

Scottish footballer

Personal information
- Place of birth: Glasgow, Scotland
- Position: Inside forward

Senior career*
Years	Team	Apps	(Gls)
- Clyde
- Stenhousemuir
1936	Watford	3	(1)
1936–1939	Burnley	23	(2)
- Dunfermline Athletic
- * Club domestic league appearances and goals

Peter Fisher was a Scottish professional association footballer who played as an inside forward.
