= Peter Rodrigues =

Welsh footballer

Personal information
- Full name: Peter Joseph Rodrigues
- Date of birth: 21 January 1944 (age 82)
- Place of birth: Cardiff, Wales
- Height: 5 ft 9 in (1.75 m)
- Position: Full back

Senior career*
Years	Team	Apps	(Gls)
1961–1965	Cardiff City	85	(2)
1965–1970	Leicester City	140	(6)
1970–1975	Sheffield Wednesday	162	(2)
1975–1977	Southampton	59	(3)
Total		446	(13)

International career
1965–1973	Wales	40	(0)
- * Club domestic league appearances and goals

Peter Joseph Rodrigues (born 21 January 1944) is a Welsh retired footballer. He was the captain of Southampton's 1976 FA Cup-winning team, and the last captain to be presented the FA Cup by the Queen.

Rodrigues started his playing career at Cardiff City in 1961. He then joined Leicester City in 1965, and played in their FA Cup final defeat in 1969. After spending five years at Leicester, he moved to Sheffield Wednesday. In 1975, he was signed by Southampton on a free transfer, before a knee injury ended his professional career.

== Club career ==
=== Cardiff City ===
Rodrigues was born in Cardiff, Wales, and originally turned out for his local schools. He went on to be selected for both Cardiff Schoolboys and for Welsh schoolboys, before signing for Cardiff City as a professional in May 1961. Rodrigues almost left the side before ever making a professional appearance for the club when Newport County offered £500 to take him to Somerton Park, but the offer was turned down by Cardiff. He went on to make his debut in a 3–3 draw with Sunderland in September 1963, and for the next three seasons he was virtually ever-present in the side. Rodrigues was given a new contract, but Matt Gillies wanted to sign him for Leicester.

=== Leicester City and Sheffield Wednesday ===
Rodrigues was signed by Leicester City in December 1965, to fill the right back position, moving John Sjoberg into the centre of the field. He was an established Welsh international when he arrived at City for a club record fee of £42,500. Rodrigues' attacking full back play set a standard to City's play in the next decade and when Steve Whitworth replaced Rodrigues he played with the same passion to go forward. Rodrigues was a fine over-lapping full-back who was renowned for his sliding tackles.

Rodrigues made 139 league appearances for Leicester scoring six goals, plus a further 29 cup appearances including Leicester's defeat in the 1969 FA Cup final to Manchester City, before leaving to join Sheffield Wednesday in October 1970.

=== Southampton ===
Rodrigues was signed on a free transfer by Southampton at the age of 30 in 1975, after being released from his contract by Sheffield Wednesday. The Welsh international full-back was signed by Lawrie McMenemy as cover for Steve Mills, who had been injured in a car crash and was out of action for a lengthy period of time. Rodrigues' first season at The Dell could not have been better, with the side winning their first and only FA Cup. Rodrigues played at right-back in the Wembley final, and captained the team, as Southampton beat Manchester United 1–0. Rodrigues was the last captain to be presented the FA Cup by Queen Elizabeth II.

However, Rodrigues' second year at The Dell saw his playing days ended with a persistent knee injury. He made 59 league appearances for Saints scoring three goals, plus a further 13 cup and other appearances.

== Retirement ==
After retirement from professional football, Rodrigues became the landlord of the King Rufus pub in Eling. He later played for Romsey Town in the Hampshire League and coached several other local clubs.

In 1987, Rodrigues moved back to Wales to take over another pub and set up a soccer school in Tenby.

He later returned to Southampton to manage the Conservative Club, where he stayed for eight years until the death of his wife, Lynn. In 2002, Rodrigues moved to Alicante in Spain for a few years, but after remarrying (to Carol) he settled back in Southampton.

In October 2004, Rodrigues' eldest daughter placed his FA Cup winner's medal up for auction without his knowledge. The medal sold for £10,200 and was initially said to have been purchased by a mystery bidder, but it was subsequently announced that the medal had been purchased by Southampton Football Club.

== Honours ==
Leicester City

- FA Cup runner-up: 1968–69

Southampton

- FA Cup: 1975–76
