= Ian Turner (footballer, born 1953) =

English former footballer

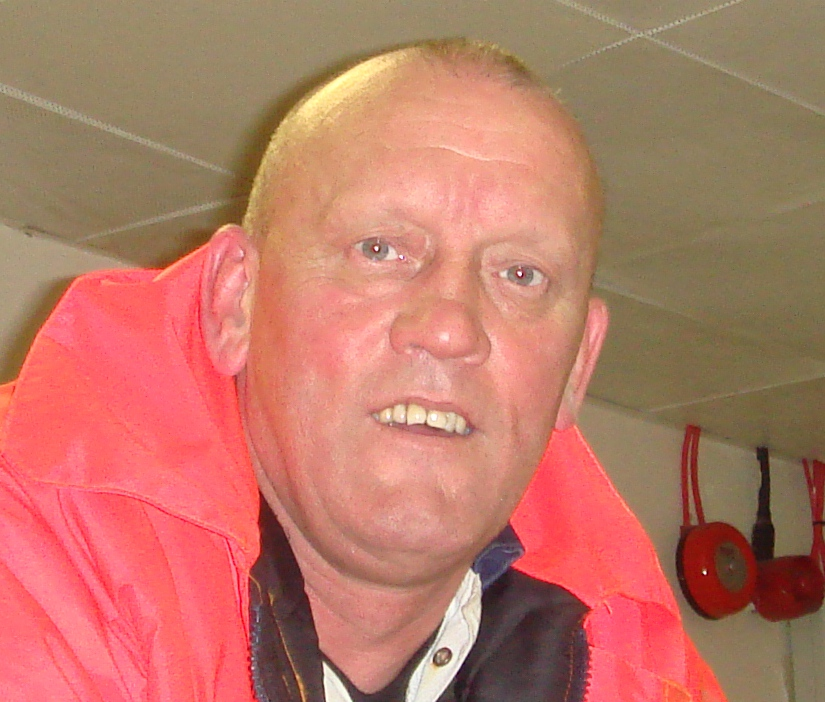
- Turner in 2006

Personal information
- Date of birth: 17 January 1953 (age 73)
- Place of birth: Middlesbrough, England
- Height: 6 ft 0 in (1.83 m)
- Position: Goalkeeper

Youth career
- South Bank

Senior career*
Years	Team	Apps	(Gls)
1970–1972	Huddersfield Town	0	(0)
1972–1974	Grimsby Town	26	(0)
1973	→ Walsall (loan)	3	(0)
1974–1979	Southampton	77	(0)
1978	→ Newport County (loan)	7	(0)
1978	→ Fort Lauderdale Strikers (loan)		
1978	→ Lincoln City (loan)	7	(0)
1979–1982	Walsall	39	(0)
1980	→ Luton Town (loan)	0	(0)
1981	→ Halifax Town (loan)	5	(0)
1982–1984	Witney Town		
1984–1985	Salisbury City		
1985	Totton		
1985	Road-Sea Southampton		
1985–1986	Waterlooville		
Total		164	(0)

Managerial career
- 1987: Romsey Town
- 1987–1988: Brockenhurst
- 1992–1993: Romsey Town
- 1993: Totton
- * Club domestic league appearances and goals

Ian Turner (born 17 January 1953) is an English former professional footballer, who won the FA Cup when he played for Southampton as goalkeeper in the 1976 FA Cup final.

== Club career ==
=== Early career ===
Turner originally played at centre-half for his local team, South Bank. However, during a match against Huddersfield Reserves, he played as a goalkeeper and was noticed by Huddersfield Town manager, Ian Greaves, who signed him as a professional in October 1970.

He transferred to Grimsby Town in March 1972 where he first became acquainted with manager Lawrie McMenemy.

=== Southampton ===
In March 1974, Southampton were seeking a replacement for long-time goalkeeper, Eric Martin, so McMenemy, who was by now Southampton's manager, went back to his former club, Grimsby, to sign Turner.

He was the first choice keeper for the next few seasons, and in May 1976 was part of the Southampton team who beat Manchester United 1–0 in the FA Cup final. Manchester United started stronger, and missed several early goalscoring opportunities, with Turner making a series of impressive saves to deny Gerry Daly and Gordon Hill.

He was a brave and reliable keeper, but at the start of the 1976–77 season he injured his left knee and required an operation to remove both cartilages. After his return to fitness he only made occasional appearances, including three appearances in European games against Olympique Marseille (twice) and Napoli. He started the following season as first-choice keeper, but after eight games he lost his place to Peter Wells in October 1977.

He left Southampton in the summer of 1978 to play for Fort Lauderdale. In his five years at The Dell, he made 107 first team appearances for Southampton.

=== Other clubs ===
During his career, he played on loan at various clubs, including Walsall, Newport County, Lincoln City, Luton Town and Halifax Town and spells at various non-league clubs including Witney Town, Salisbury City, Waterlooville.

== Coaching career ==
In 1987, Turner became player-manager of Romsey Town before joining Brockenhurst several months later. In 1992, he had a second stint with Romsey Town. He also player-managed AFC Totton in 1993.

== After football ==
After leaving football, he worked as an engineer in the oil industry in the North Sea and Middle East, and later worked for UK Construction.

== Honours ==
=== As a player ===
Southampton

- FA Cup: 1975–76
