= 1976 FA Cup final =

- Event: 1975–76 FA Cup
Manchester United	Southampton
0	1
- Date: 1 May 1976
- Venue: Wembley Stadium, London
- Referee: Clive Thomas (Treorchy)
- Attendance: 99,115

The 1976 FA Cup final was the 95th final of the FA Cup. It took place on 1 May 1976 at Wembley Stadium and was contested between Manchester United and Southampton.

United had finished third in the First Division that season, and were strong favourites, while unfancied Southampton had finished sixth in the Second Division, Southampton had more players with FA Cup final experience than Manchester United, namely Jim McCalliog (1966), Peter Rodrigues (1969) and Peter Osgood (1970). In one of the biggest shocks in the history of the final, Southampton won 1–0 through an 83rd-minute goal from Bobby Stokes. It was the first time Southampton won a major trophy, and the last time that Elizabeth II attended a final and presented the trophy to the winners. As their women's team had won the 1976 WFA Cup final a week earlier, they became the first club to win the men's and women's FA Cup in the same season.

== Road to Wembley ==
=== Manchester United ===
Home teams listed first.

Round 3: Manchester United 2–1 Oxford United

Round 4: Manchester United 3–1 Peterborough United

Round 5: Leicester City 1–2 Manchester United

Round 6: Manchester United 1–1 Wolverhampton Wanderers

Replay: Wolverhampton Wanderers 2–3 Manchester United

Semi-final: Manchester United 2–0 Derby County (at Hillsborough Stadium, Sheffield)

=== Southampton ===
Home teams listed first.

Round 3: Southampton 1–1 Aston Villa

Replay: Aston Villa 1–2 Southampton

Round 4: Southampton 3–1 Blackpool

Round 5: West Bromwich Albion 1–1 Southampton

Replay: Southampton 4–0 West Bromwich Albion

Round 6: Bradford City 0–1 Southampton

Semi-final: Southampton 2–0 Crystal Palace (at Stamford Bridge, London)

== Match summary ==
Manchester United started stronger, and missed several early goalscoring opportunities, with Southampton goalkeeper Ian Turner making a series of impressive saves to deny Gerry Daly and Gordon Hill. Southampton in turn began to create chances; Mick Channon was put through on goal before being denied by goalkeeper Alex Stepney. As extra time loomed, Southampton's Bobby Stokes received Jim McCalliog's pass and slotted the ball across Stepney and into the far corner to score a late winner and with it his side's first major trophy.

== Match details ==
1 May 1976
15:00 BST

Manchester United	0–1	Southampton
	Report	Stokes 83'

Wembley Stadium, London
Attendance: 99,115
Referee: Clive Thomas

Manchester United	Southampton

GK	1	(England) Alex Stepney
RB	2	(Scotland) Alex Forsyth
LB	3	(Scotland) Stewart Houston
CM	4	(Republic of Ireland) Gerry Daly
CB	5	(England) Brian Greenhoff
CB	6	(Scotland) Martin Buchan (c)
RM	7	(England) Steve Coppell
CM	8	(Northern Ireland) Sammy McIlroy
CF	9	(England) Stuart Pearson
CF	10	(Scotland) Lou Macari
LM	11	(England) Gordon Hill	(substituted off) 66'
Substitute:
MF	12	(Northern Ireland) David McCreery	(substituted on) 66'
Manager:
(Scotland) Tommy Docherty

GK	1	(England) Ian Turner
RB	2	(Wales) Peter Rodrigues (c)
LB	3	(England) David Peach
CM	4	(England) Nick Holmes
CB	5	(England) Mel Blyth
CB	6	(Scotland) Jim Steele
RM	7	(England) Paul Gilchrist
CF	8	(England) Mick Channon
CF	9	(England) Peter Osgood
CM	10	(Scotland) Jim McCalliog
LM	11	(England) Bobby Stokes
Substitute:
MF	12	(Scotland) Hugh Fisher
Manager:
(England) Lawrie McMenemy

== In popular culture ==
Jasper Carrott immortalised the match in his song "Cup Final '76", which appeared on the album Carrott In Notts.

Footage from the match's winning goal was used in the 1999 one-off ITV comedy film Bostock's Cup. The viewers were under the illusion that the team in the final were the titular team Bostock Stanley, scoring the winner.
