= Paul Gilchrist =

English footballer (born 1951)

Personal information
- Full name: Paul Anthony Gilchrist
- Date of birth: 5 January 1951 (age 75)
- Place of birth: Dartford, England
- Height: 5 ft 11 in (1.80 m)
- Position: Forward

Senior career*
Years	Team	Apps	(Gls)
1968–1971	Charlton Athletic	7	(0)
1971–1972	Doncaster Rovers	22	(8)
1972–1977	Southampton	107	(17)
1977–1978	Portsmouth	39	(3)
1978–1980	Swindon Town	17	(6)
1980	Hereford United	11	(1)
Total		203	(35)
- * Club domestic league appearances and goals

Paul Anthony Gilchrist (born 5 January 1951) is a former footballer who played as a forward. He won the FA Cup with Southampton in 1976.

Gilchrist began his career with Charlton Athletic in 1968, before departing two years later to join Doncaster Rovers. In 1972, he moved to Southampton. After spending five years at Southampton, Gilchrist joined Portsmouth in 1978. A year later, he signed for Swindon Town. In 1980, Gilchrist joined Hereford United before a cruciate ligament injury forced him to retire.

== Early life ==
Paul Gilchrist was born in Dartford, Kent.

== Playing career ==
=== Early career ===
Gilchrist was a Charlton apprentice and played seven league games for them. During his time at Charlton he was loaned out briefly to several clubs, including Cambridge United and Fulham, but never played in their first teams.

In September 1970, he joined non-league Yeovil Town, initially on loan (he played four games), Gilchrist joined 4th Division Doncaster Rovers in the 1971 close season. He was relatively successful in the 1971–72 season, scoring 8 goals in his 22 appearances, which prompted Lawrie McMenemy to sign him for 1st Division Southampton.

=== Southampton ===
He joined Saints for a fee of £30,000 in March 1972, and over the next five years was intermittently in and out of the first team, as they were relegated from Division 1 at the end of the 1973–74 season. According to Lawrie McMenemy he was "One of the quiet brigade but a likeable, popular player". He suffered a number of injuries while at Southampton but managed to score 22 goals in his 120 appearances.

His major contribution to Saints' history came in the run to the FA Cup final in 1976, when he scored two goals, the more important of which was the first goal, scored from 25 yards, in the semi-final against Crystal Palace. Southampton went on to win the final at Wembley 1–0 against Manchester United on 1 May 1976.

He only made two league appearances in the following season, his final appearance being at The Valley, where he had started his career with Charlton. Southampton lost this game 6–2 and Gilchrist's place in the side had been taken by Ted MacDougall, who had recently signed from Norwich City.

Gilchrist spent a brief, unhappy period at the end of 1976 on loan to Alahfi in Saudi Arabia, before moving to Portsmouth in March 1977.

=== Portsmouth ===
Ian St. John, then manager at 3rd Division Portsmouth, invited Gilchrist to join the struggling club. Although Gilchrist played in every remaining game that season, because of his history with their local rivals, he was made the scape-goat for his new club's problems, and was barracked by the home fans throughout every game.

By the end of the 1977–78 season, Gilchrist had been joined at Portsmouth by his fellow ex-Saint, Bobby Stokes and St. John had been replaced as manager by Jimmy Dickinson, but he could not prevent Portsmouth being relegated into Division 4. By then, Gilchrist had played his last league game for the club.

=== Swindon and Hereford ===
Despite the fact that Bobby Smith was in charge of team affairs at 3rd Division Swindon, it was general manager Danny Williams who influenced the signing of Gilchrist in August 1978. Smith didn't take well to this, and within a month, he had bought Andy Rowland from Bury.

Because of this, Gilchrist found it difficult to break into the first team, even though his scoring record was good – he scored six goals from ten games. He was one of the players who made way after a home defeat by Plymouth in January 1979 – and he only made seven more substitute appearances for the club, before leaving for 4th Division Hereford United in March 1980.

At Hereford, he played every game to the end of the 1979–80 season and Hereford just managed to avoid having to apply to be re-elected to the League. His only goal for Hereford came in the final game of the season.

At the start of the following season, in a pre-season friendly against Wolves, he suffered a broken cruciate ligament in his leg after a nasty tackle, and, despite a year of medical treatment, his football career was over.

== After football ==
With his partner, he opened a fitness centre in Swindon, which he ran successfully for seven years before moving to Redhill, Surrey where he is employed as a service advisor at a BMW/MINI dealership. He lives in a village close to Tunbridge Wells.

== Honours ==
Southampton

- FA Cup: 1975–76
