= Lawrie McMenemy =

English manager (born 1936)

Lawrie McMenemy MBE
Personal information
- Full name: Lawrence McMenemy
- Date of birth: 26 July 1936 (age 90)
- Place of birth: Gateshead, England

Youth career
- Newcastle United

Senior career*
Years	Team	Apps	(Gls)
1959–1961	Gateshead		

Managerial career
- 1964–1967: Bishop Auckland
- 1968–1971: Doncaster Rovers
- 1971–1973: Grimsby Town
- 1973–1985: Southampton
- 1985–1987: Sunderland
- 1990–1993: England U21
- 1998–1999: Northern Ireland
- * Club domestic league appearances and goals

Lawrence McMenemy MBE (born 26 July 1936) is an English former football coach, best known for his spell as manager of Southampton. He is rated in the Guinness Book of Records as one of the twenty most successful managers in post-war English football.

== Playing career ==
McMenemy was born in Gateshead. After serving in the Coldstream Guards he began his footballing career with Newcastle United although he never appeared in their first team. He moved to Gateshead in the late 1950s, joining the club after they had left the Football League. An injury ended his career in 1961, but he moved into coaching instead, spending three years in that role at Gateshead.

== Managerial career ==
=== Bishop Auckland ===
In 1964, McMenemy was appointed manager of non-league Bishop Auckland and transformed them from a struggling side into Northern League champions and also took them to the second round of the FA Cup.

=== Sheffield Wednesday and Doncaster Rovers ===
McMenemy then moved to Sheffield Wednesday where he spent two years as a coach before he got his big break as manager of Doncaster Rovers where he remained until May 1971, winning the Fourth Division Championship in 1968–69.

=== Grimsby Town ===
McMenemy then became manager of Grimsby Town, where he won a Fourth Division championship. In July 1973 he left Blundell Park to become assistant manager at Southampton.

=== Southampton ===
In November 1973, four months after joining the Saints as assistant manager, McMenemy was promoted to the role of manager, replacing Ted Bates. He was unable to keep them in the First Division that season, but the board kept faith in him to lift the club back out of the Second Division.

In 1976, McMenemy guided Southampton, then in the Second Division, to an FA Cup final victory over Manchester United. It was widely predicted before the game that United would easily win (one pundit said the score would go into double figures). However Southampton, who were in the Second Division at the time (the current Championship) and had a much older team, put up a stern challenge against United. The only goal of the game was scored by Bobby Stokes with just seven minutes to go, and captain Peter Rodrigues received the FA Cup trophy from the Queen. They were the second club from outside the First Division of English football in four seasons to win the FA Cup after Sunderland in 1973 and only one more side from outside the top flight (West Ham United in 1980) has won the trophy. These, as of 2025, are the only three instances in the post-Second World War era when the trophy has been won by a team outside the top division.

In 1978, the Saints won promotion to the First Division and in 1979 reached the League Cup final where they lost 3–2 to Nottingham Forest.

McMenemy was linked with the vacant Manchester United manager's job at the end of the 1980–81 season, but he ruled himself out of the running and the job went to Ron Atkinson instead.

McMenemy had signed 1966 World Cup winner Alan Ball to aid his side, later adding serving England captain Kevin Keegan when he returned from Germany in 1980. Southampton emerged as title challengers in the 1981–82 season, regularly topping the table, before they finished seventh and the title went to Liverpool. Keegan was sold to Newcastle United that summer, but McMenemy made another big name signing when he captured England goalkeeper Peter Shilton. In 1984, he guided the club to second place in the First Division – their highest ever finish.

=== Sunderland ===
McMenemy left Southampton on 1 June 1985, but returned to football five days later when he was named manager of Sunderland, who had just been relegated to the Second Division. At the time he was the highest-paid manager in English football, but his time on Wearside was not a success and he quit in March 1987 – just weeks before Sunderland fell into the Third Division for the first time in their history.

=== England ===
In July 1990, McMenemy ended a three-year break from football when he was appointed assistant to England manager Graham Taylor, managing the Under-21 side, and picking out future talents like Darren Anderton and Steve McManaman. In November 1993, after England failed to qualify for USA 94, Taylor and McMenemy both resigned. They had reached the 1992 European Championships in Sweden, but failed to progress beyond the group stages.

=== Return to Southampton ===
McMenemy soon bounced back and was offered the new position of Director of Football by Southampton within weeks of leaving his role with the England team. Fans and the local media were delighted when he accepted the role, which made him the first man to be employed as a Director of Football in the English game. In McMenemy's first season back at Southampton, the Saints finished 10th in the Premiership. However, it did not last long and in 1997, when Rupert Lowe arrived as the new chairman, neither McMenemy nor then-manager Graeme Souness got on with him and promptly resigned, publicly denouncing the new board in the process.

=== Northern Ireland ===
A year later, in 1998 McMenemy was appointed Northern Ireland manager, but he was not successful and he resigned two years later after they failed to qualify for the 2000 European Championships.

== Other football work ==
Since 2000, McMenemy has concentrated on his role as FA special ambassador, travelling to Afghanistan in 2002 to help set up a national league and liaising with the English team in the Special Olympics.

In July 2006, he was appointed a non-executive director of Southampton FC.

== Media work ==
McMenemy has made frequent appearances on TV football panels since 1972 as well as BBC TV's "Superkids" and TVS's "Children's Challenge". He also regularly appeared on TV-am prior to 1990 as their football analyst. He presented BBC Radio's "Down Your Way" in 1989 and was a summariser for Sky TV News & Eurosport satellite TV until 1990. He currently is in demand as an after-dinner speaker. He has written several books on management motivation. He wrote a regular column in the Southern Daily Echo. He has appeared on the documentary Dream Fans the Spirit of Southampton in 2005. He is also the author of a testimonial in The Future of the NHS. His media work also saw him as a panel member of 5 World Cups as well as TV appearances on This Is Your Life and Parkinson. McMenemy is also the Chairman of the Special Olympics UK. He hosts the Special Olympics Gateshead Tyne & Wear annual awards night.

== Personal life ==
He is related to Harry McMenemy. He is married to Anne, and has three children Chris (ex. Chesterfield FC Manager, Newcastle United FC first team coach, AFC Sunderland coach), Sean and Alison.

== Honours ==
=== As a manager ===
Bishop Auckland

- Northern League Champions & County Cup: 1964–65

Doncaster Rovers

- Football League Fourth Division: 1968–69

Grimsby Town

- Football League Fourth Division: 1971–72

Southampton

- FA Cup: 1975–76
- Football League Second Division runner-up: 1977–78
- Football League Cup runner-up: 1978–79

=== Individual ===
- Awarded the MBE in 2006
- Received an honorary MBA from Southampton Solent University
- Received an Honorary Doctorate of Laws from the University of Bath in 2015.
- Freedom of the City of Southampton
