= 1975–76 FA Cup =

Tournament details
- Country: England; Wales

Final positions
- Champions: Southampton (1st title)
- Runners-up: Manchester United

Tournament statistics
- Top goal scorer: Alan Gowling (7)

The 1975–76 FA Cup was the 95th staging of the world's oldest football knockout competition, the Football Association Challenge Cup, or FA Cup. The final saw second division Southampton defeat Manchester United 1–0, with the only goal coming from Bobby Stokes in the 83rd minute of the game.

== Qualifying rounds ==
Most participating clubs that were not members of the Football League competed in the qualifying rounds to secure one of 28 places available in the first round.

The winners from the fourth qualifying round were Spennymoor United, Rossendale United, Morecambe, Gateshead United, Marine, Winsford United, Macclesfield Town, Grantham, Nuneaton Town, Boston United, Stafford Rangers, Coventry Sporting, AP Leamington, Bedford Town, Romford, Dartford, Bishop's Stortford, Leatherhead, Wycombe Wanderers, Tooting & Mitcham United, Wimbledon, Dover, Wealdstone, Hendon, Walton & Hersham, Sutton United, Weymouth and Yeovil Town.

Coventry Sporting was appearing in the competition proper for the first (and only) time, while Bedford Town was re-appearing at this stage for the first time since 1966–67. Winsford United qualified for the first round for the first time since the 1887–88 tournament, when the club was still known as Over Wanderers.

Tooting & Mitcham United became the first club to participate in eight rounds of one tournament since Gravesend & Northfleet in 1962–63, defeating St Albans City, Stevenage Athletic, Addlestone, Southall & Ealing Borough, Romford, Leatherhead and Swindon Town before going out to Bradford City at Valley Parade.

== First round proper ==
The 48 teams from the Football League Third and Fourth Divisions entered in this round along with the 28 non-league clubs from the qualifying rounds and Matlock Town, Scarborough, Wigan Athletic and Altrincham who were given byes. The first round of games were played on 22 November 1975. Replays were played mainly during 24–26 November, with second replays performed one or two weeks after.

| Tie no | Home team | Score | Away team | Date |
|---|---|---|---|---|
| 1 | Darlington | 0–0 | Chester | 22 November 1975 |
| Replay | Chester | 2–0 | Darlington | 26 November 1975 |
| 2 | Dartford | 1–4 | Bishop's Stortford | 22 November 1975 |
| 3 | Hartlepool | 3–0 | Stockport County | 22 November 1975 |
| 4 | Bury | 4–2 | Doncaster Rovers | 22 November 1975 |
| 5 | Grantham | 2–2 | Port Vale | 22 November 1975 |
| Replay | Port Vale | 4–1 | Grantham | 24 November 1975 |
| 6 | Preston North End | 2–1 | Scunthorpe United | 22 November 1975 |
| 7 | Sutton United | 1–1 | AFC Bournemouth | 22 November 1975 |
| Replay | AFC Bournemouth | 1–0 | Sutton United | 26 November 1975 |
| 8 | Watford | 0–3 | Brighton & Hove Albion | 22 November 1975 |
| 9 | Weymouth | 0–2 | Gillingham | 22 November 1975 |
| 10 | Yeovil Town | 1–1 | Millwall | 22 November 1975 |
| Replay | Millwall | 2–2 | Yeovil Town | 25 November 1975 |
| Replay | Yeovil Town | 0–1 | Millwall | 3 December 1975 |
| 11 | Marine | 3–1 | Barnsley | 22 November 1975 |
| 12 | Walsall | 0–1 | Huddersfield Town | 22 November 1975 |
| 13 | Sheffield Wednesday | 3–1 | Macclesfield Town | 22 November 1975 |
| 14 | Grimsby Town | 1–3 | Gateshead United | 22 November 1975 |
| 15 | Scarborough | 2–0 | Morecambe | 22 November 1975 |
| 16 | Wycombe Wanderers | 0–0 | Bedford Town | 22 November 1975 |
| Replay | Bedford Town | 2–2 | Wycombe Wanderers | 24 November 1975 |
| Replay | Wycombe Wanderers | 2–1 | Bedford Town | 1 December 1975 |
| 17 | Brentford | 2–0 | Northampton Town | 22 November 1975 |
| 18 | Rossendale United | 0–1 | Shrewsbury Town | 22 November 1975 |
| 19 | Bradford City | 1–0 | Chesterfield | 22 November 1975 |
| 20 | Crystal Palace | 1–0 | Walton & Hersham | 22 November 1975 |
| 21 | Spennymoor United | 4–1 | Southport | 22 November 1975 |
| 22 | Southend United | 2–0 | Swansea City | 22 November 1975 |
| 23 | Mansfield Town | 1–1 | Wrexham | 22 November 1975 |
| Replay | Wrexham | 1–1 | Mansfield Town | 24 November 1975 |
| Replay | Mansfield Town | 2–1 | Wrexham | 8 December 1975 |
| 24 | Cardiff City | 6–2 | Exeter City | 22 November 1975 |
| 25 | Halifax Town | 3–1 | Altrincham | 22 November 1975 |
| 26 | Newport County | 2–2 | Swindon Town | 22 November 1975 |
| Replay | Swindon Town | 3–0 | Newport County | 25 November 1975 |
| 27 | Workington | 1–1 | Rochdale | 22 November 1975 |
| Replay | Rochdale | 2–1 | Workington | 25 November 1975 |
| 28 | Hereford United | 2–0 | Torquay United | 22 November 1975 |
| 29 | Rotherham United | 2–1 | Crewe Alexandra | 22 November 1975 |
| 30 | Aldershot | 4–3 | Wealdstone | 22 November 1975 |
| 31 | Romford | 0–1 | Tooting & Mitcham United | 22 November 1975 |
| 32 | Wigan Athletic | 4–1 | Matlock Town | 22 November 1975 |
| 33 | Boston United | 0–1 | Lincoln City | 22 November 1975 |
| 34 | Peterborough United | 4–1 | Winsford United | 22 November 1975 |
| 35 | Colchester United | 3–3 | Dover | 22 November 1975 |
| Replay | Dover | 4–1 | Colchester United | 26 November 1975 |
| 36 | Nuneaton Borough | 0–1 | Wimbledon | 22 November 1975 |
| 37 | Hendon | 1–0 | Reading | 22 November 1975 |
| 38 | Leatherhead | 2–0 | Cambridge United | 22 November 1975 |
| 39 | AP Leamington | 2–3 | Stafford Rangers | 22 November 1975 |
| 40 | Coventry Sporting | 2–0 | Tranmere Rovers | 22 November 1975 |

== Second round proper ==
The second round of games were played on 13 December 1975. Replays took place on the 15th–17th or the 22nd.

| Tie no | Home team | Score | Away team | Date |
|---|---|---|---|---|
| 1 | AFC Bournemouth | 2–2 | Hereford United | 13 December 1975 |
| Replay | Hereford United | 2–0 | AFC Bournemouth | 17 December 1975 |
| 2 | Bury | 3–0 | Spennymoor United | 13 December 1975 |
| 3 | Marine | 1–1 | Hartlepool | 13 December 1975 |
| Replay | Hartlepool | 6–3 | Marine | 15 December 1975 |
| 4 | Gillingham | 0–1 | Brighton & Hove Albion | 13 December 1975 |
| 5 | Sheffield Wednesday | 2–0 | Wigan Athletic | 13 December 1975 |
| 6 | Stafford Rangers | 1–3 | Halifax Town | 13 December 1975 |
| 7 | Scarborough | 3–2 | Preston North End | 13 December 1975 |
| 8 | Shrewsbury Town | 3–1 | Chester | 13 December 1975 |
| 9 | Millwall | 1–1 | Crystal Palace | 13 December 1975 |
| Replay | Crystal Palace | 2–1 | Millwall | 16 December 1975 |
| 10 | Wimbledon | 0–2 | Brentford | 13 December 1975 |
| 11 | Southend United | 4–1 | Dover | 13 December 1975 |
| 12 | Huddersfield Town | 2–1 | Port Vale | 13 December 1975 |
| 13 | Mansfield Town | 1–2 | Lincoln City | 13 December 1975 |
| 14 | Cardiff City | 1–0 | Wycombe Wanderers | 13 December 1975 |
| 15 | Rotherham United | 0–3 | Bradford City | 13 December 1975 |
| 16 | Aldershot | 2–0 | Bishop's Stortford | 13 December 1975 |
| 17 | Hendon | 0–1 | Swindon Town | 13 December 1975 |
| 18 | Leatherhead | 0–0 | Tooting & Mitcham United | 13 December 1975 |
| Replay | Tooting & Mitcham United | 2–1 | Leatherhead | 22 December 1975 |
| 19 | Coventry Sporting | 0–4 | Peterborough United | 13 December 1975 |
| 20 | Gateshead United | 1–1 | Rochdale | 13 December 1975 |
| Replay | Rochdale | 3–1 | Gateshead United | 16 December 1975 |

== Third round proper ==
Teams from the Football League First and Second Division entered in this round. The third round of games in the FA Cup were mainly played on 3 January 1976, with two matches played two days earlier on New Year's Day. Replays were mainly played midweek over 6–7 January or the week after but one occurred on the 24th instead. Holders West Ham United were eliminated by Liverpool.

| Tie no | Home team | Score | Away team | Date |
|---|---|---|---|---|
| 1 | Blackpool | 1–0 | Burnley | 3 January 1976 |
| 2 | Southampton | 1–1 | Aston Villa | 3 January 1976 |
| Replay | Aston Villa | 1–2 | Southampton | 7 January 1976 |
| 3 | Leicester City | 3–0 | Sheffield United | 3 January 1976 |
| 4 | Notts County | 0–1 | Leeds United | 3 January 1976 |
| 5 | Nottingham Forest | 0–0 | Peterborough United | 1 January 1976 |
| Replay | Peterborough United | 1–0 | Nottingham Forest | 7 January 1976 |
| 6 | Wolverhampton Wanderers | 3–0 | Arsenal | 3 January 1976 |
| 7 | Middlesbrough | 0–0 | Bury | 3 January 1976 |
| Replay | Bury | 3–2 | Middlesbrough | 6 January 1976 |
| 8 | West Bromwich Albion | 3–1 | Carlisle United | 3 January 1976 |
| 9 | Sunderland | 2–0 | Oldham Athletic | 3 January 1976 |
| 10 | Derby County | 2–1 | Everton | 3 January 1976 |
| 11 | Luton Town | 2–0 | Blackburn Rovers | 3 January 1976 |
| 12 | Swindon Town | 2–2 | Tooting & Mitcham United | 3 January 1976 |
| Replay | Tooting & Mitcham United | 2–1 | Swindon Town | 6 January 1976 |
| 13 | Scarborough | 1–2 | Crystal Palace | 3 January 1976 |
| 14 | Shrewsbury Town | 1–2 | Bradford City | 3 January 1976 |
| 15 | Ipswich Town | 3–1 | Halifax Town | 3 January 1976 |
| 16 | Tottenham Hotspur | 1–1 | Stoke City | 3 January 1976 |
| Replay | Stoke City | 2–1 | Tottenham Hotspur | 24 January 1976 |
| 17 | Manchester City | 6–0 | Hartlepool | 3 January 1976 |
| 18 | Queens Park Rangers | 0–0 | Newcastle United | 3 January 1976 |
| Replay | Newcastle United | 2–1 | Queens Park Rangers | 7 January 1976 |
| 19 | Fulham | 2–3 | Huddersfield Town | 3 January 1976 |
| 20 | Brentford | 0–0 | Bolton Wanderers | 3 January 1976 |
| Replay | Bolton Wanderers | 2–0 | Brentford | 6 January 1976 |
| 21 | Coventry City | 2–1 | Bristol City | 3 January 1976 |
| 22 | Portsmouth | 1–1 | Birmingham City | 3 January 1976 |
| Replay | Birmingham City | 0–1 | Portsmouth | 6 January 1976 |
| 23 | West Ham United | 0–2 | Liverpool | 3 January 1976 |
| 24 | Manchester United | 2–1 | Oxford United | 3 January 1976 |
| 25 | Norwich City | 1–1 | Rochdale | 3 January 1976 |
| Replay | Rochdale | 0–0 | Norwich City | 6 January 1976 |
| Replay | Norwich City | 2–1 | Rochdale | 13 January 1976 |
| 26 | Hull City | 1–1 | Plymouth Argyle | 3 January 1976 |
| Replay | Plymouth Argyle | 1–4 | Hull City | 6 January 1976 |
| 27 | Chelsea | 1–1 | Bristol Rovers | 1 January 1976 |
| Replay | Bristol Rovers | 0–1 | Chelsea | 3 January 1976 |
| 28 | Southend United | 2–1 | Brighton & Hove Albion | 3 January 1976 |
| 29 | Charlton Athletic | 2–1 | Sheffield Wednesday | 3 January 1976 |
| 30 | York City | 2–1 | Hereford United | 3 January 1976 |
| 31 | Aldershot | 1–2 | Lincoln City | 3 January 1976 |
| 32 | Orient | 0–1 | Cardiff City | 3 January 1976 |

== Fourth round proper ==
The fourth-round games were mostly played on 28 January 1976, with three replays and a main match on the 27th and 28th. The Sunderland-Hull City match was postponed until 2 February because of bad weather. Tooting & Mitcham United was the last non-league club left in the competition.

| Tie no | Home team | Score | Away team | Date |
|---|---|---|---|---|
| 1 | Southampton | 3–1 | Blackpool | 24 January 1976 |
| 2 | Leicester City | 1–0 | Bury | 24 January 1976 |
| 3 | West Bromwich Albion | 3–2 | Lincoln City | 24 January 1976 |
| 4 | Sunderland | 1–0 | Hull City | 2 February 1976 |
| 5 | Derby County | 1–0 | Liverpool | 24 January 1976 |
| 6 | Ipswich Town | 0–0 | Wolverhampton Wanderers | 24 January 1976 |
| Replay | Wolverhampton Wanderers | 1–0 | Ipswich Town | 27 January 1976 |
| 7 | Coventry City | 1–1 | Newcastle United | 24 January 1976 |
| Replay | Newcastle United | 5–0 | Coventry City | 28 January 1976 |
| 8 | Manchester United | 3–1 | Peterborough United | 24 January 1976 |
| 9 | Norwich City | 2–0 | Luton Town | 24 January 1976 |
| 10 | Bradford City | 3–1 | Tooting & Mitcham United | 24 January 1976 |
| 11 | Southend United | 2–1 | Cardiff City | 24 January 1976 |
| 12 | Huddersfield Town | 0–1 | Bolton Wanderers | 24 January 1976 |
| 13 | Charlton Athletic | 1–1 | Portsmouth | 24 January 1976 |
| Replay | Portsmouth | 0–3 | Charlton Athletic | 27 January 1976 |
| 14 | Leeds United | 0–1 | Crystal Palace | 24 January 1976 |
| 15 | York City | 0–2 | Chelsea | 24 January 1976 |
| 16 | Stoke City | 1–0 | Manchester City | 28 January 1976 |

== Fifth round proper ==
The fifth set of games took place (except for one game) on 14 February 1976. Three games went to a replay which were played on 17–18 February. The Norwich City–Bradford City match and a second replay of the Bolton Wanderers–Newcastle United match were played on 23 February.

| Tie no | Home team | Score | Away team | Date |
|---|---|---|---|---|
| 1 | Leicester City | 1–2 | Manchester United | 14 February 1976 |
| 2 | Bolton Wanderers | 3–3 | Newcastle United | 14 February 1976 |
| Replay | Newcastle United | 0–0 | Bolton Wanderers | 18 February 1976 |
| Replay | Bolton Wanderers | 1–2 | Newcastle United | 23 February 1976 |
| 3 | Wolverhampton Wanderers | 3–0 | Charlton Athletic | 14 February 1976 |
| 4 | West Bromwich Albion | 1–1 | Southampton | 14 February 1976 |
| Replay | Southampton | 4–0 | West Bromwich Albion | 17 February 1976 |
| 5 | Derby County | 1–0 | Southend United | 14 February 1976 |
| 6 | Norwich City | 1–2 | Bradford City | 23 February 1976 |
| 7 | Chelsea | 2–3 | Crystal Palace | 14 February 1976 |
| 8 | Stoke City | 0–0 | Sunderland | 14 February 1976 |
| Replay | Sunderland | 2–1 | Stoke City | 17 February 1976 |

== Sixth round proper ==
The sixth round of FA Cup games were played on 6 March 1976. There was one replay on the 9th.

| Tie no | Home team | Score | Away team | Date |
|---|---|---|---|---|
| 1 | Sunderland | 0–1 | Crystal Palace | 6 March 1976 |
| 2 | Derby County | 4–2 | Newcastle United | 6 March 1976 |
| 3 | Manchester United | 1–1 | Wolverhampton Wanderers | 6 March 1976 |
| Replay | Wolverhampton Wanderers | 2–3 | Manchester United | 9 March 1976 |
| 4 | Bradford City | 0–1 | Southampton | 6 March 1976 |

== Semi finals ==
3 April 1976

| Manchester United | 2–0 | Derby County |
|---|---|---|
| Hill 12', 83' | Report |

Hillsborough, Sheffield
Referee: Jack Taylor, Wolverhampton

3 April 1976

| Southampton | 2–0 | Crystal Palace |
|---|---|---|
| Gilchrist 74'; Peach 80' (pen.) | Report |

Stamford Bridge, London
Referee: Pat Partridge, Stockton-on-Tees

== Final ==
1 May 1976
15:00 BST

| Southampton | 1–0 | Manchester United |
|---|---|---|
| Stokes 83' |

Wembley, London
Attendance: 100,000
Referee: Clive Thomas

| Southampton | Man United |

== TV coverage ==
The right to show FA Cup games were, as with Football League matches, shared between the BBC and ITV network. All games were shown in a highlights format, except the Final, which was shown live both on BBC1 & ITV. The BBC football highlights programme Match of the Day would show up to three games and the various ITV regional network stations would cover up to one game and show highlights from other games covered elsewhere on the ITV network. No games from Rounds 1 or 2 were shown. Highlights of replays would be shown on either the BBC or ITV.

One Fifth Round tie that was picked to be shown by ITV was postponed This was Norwich City v Bradford City (Anglia & Yorkshire) This was due to a Flu Outbreak in the Bradford City camp

Third Round BBC West Ham United v Liverpool, Scarborough v Crystal Palace, Queens Park Rangers v Newcastle United, Newcastle United v Queens Park Rangers (Midweek replay), Stoke City v Tottenham Hotspur (Saturday Replay).

ITV Derby County v Everton (ATV & Granada), Tottenham Hotspur v Stoke City (LWT), Leicester City v Sheffield United (Yorkshire out of region) Other regions showed those three games.

Fourth Round BBC Coventry City v Newcastle United, Manchester United v Peterborough United.

ITV Derby County v Liverpool (ATV & Granada), Leeds United v Crystal Palace (Yorkshire), Norwich City v Luton Town (Anglia), Charlton Athletic v Portsmouth (LWT & Southern), Stoke City v Manchester City (Midweek All regions).

Fifth Round BBC Chelsea v Crystal Palace, Bolton Wanderers v Newcastle United, Wolverhampton Wanderers v Charlton Athletic, Newcastle United v Bolton Wanderers (Midweek Both replays).

ITV Leicester City v Manchester United (ATV & Granada), Stoke City v Sunderland (Tyne-Tees Out of region), Derby County v Southend United (Anglia & LWT Out of Region).

Sixth Round BBC Derby County v Newcastle United, Bradford City v Southampton.

ITV Sunderland v Crystal Palace (Tyne-Tees & LWT), Manchester United v Wolverhampton Wanderers (Granada & ATV), Wolverhampton Wanderers v Manchester United (Midweek replay All regions).

Semi-Finals BBC Derby County v Manchester United.

ITV Crystal Palace v Southampton (All regions).

Final Manchester United v Southampton covered Live by BBC & ITV.
