= Bobby Stokes =

English footballer (1951–1995)

Personal information
- Full name: Robert William Thomas Stokes
- Date of birth: 30 January 1951
- Place of birth: Portsmouth, England
- Date of death: 30 May 1995 (aged 44)
- Place of death: Portsmouth, England
- Height: 5 ft 7 in (1.70 m)
- Position: Forward

Youth career
- 1967–1968: Southampton

Senior career*
Years	Team	Apps	(Gls)
1968–1977	Southampton	216	(40)
1977–1978	Portsmouth	24	(2)
1978–1980	Washington Diplomats	98	(17)
- Waterlooville
- Cheltenham Town
Total		338	(59)
- * Club domestic league appearances and goals

Robert William Thomas Stokes (30 January 1951 – 30 May 1995) was an English footballer, best known for scoring the winning goal in the 83rd minute of the FA Cup Final for Southampton against Manchester United in 1976.

Born in Portsmouth, Stokes spent the majority of his playing career at Southampton. He also had spells at Portsmouth, Washington Diplomats, Dartford, Cheltenham Town, Chichester City, Waterlooville, Whitchurch United and Petersfield United before retirement.

== Club career ==
=== Early career ===
Stokes was born in Portsmouth on 30 January 1951, and was brought up in the Paulsgrove area of the city. Following a successful period of boyhood football at schoolboy and county level, he quickly became a target for a number of clubs and looked likely to sign for Portsmouth. However, he failed a trial with them and instead signed for Southampton in September 1966 as an apprentice, turning professional in February 1968. He struggled to get into the first team as a young player but made his debut on 7 April 1969, scoring twice against Burnley. He continued to impress in the next few years, despite suffering relegation in 1974 with the team and missed only one game that season.

=== 1976: FA Cup Final year ===
The year would be remembered for Saints reaching the FA Cup final. Stokes had an average league campaign that season, scoring just eight goals and he nearly left The Dell before the cup final as part of an exchange deal with Portsmouth for Paul Went. However, Stokes changed his mind and stayed. In a 1977 Topical Times article, he stated "a local transfer was just what I didn't want". Stokes scored against Blackpool in the fourth round in a 3–1 victory. In the fifth round, Saints were drawn against West Bromwich Albion and were forced to put out a significantly weakened team because of a sickness bug which affected many of the first team. Although Stokes was one of the players, he scored a late equaliser in the game to draw it 1–1. Saints subsequently won the replay and Southampton's place in the final was sealed with a 2–0 semi-final defeat of Crystal Palace.

Southampton faced Football League First Division Manchester United in the final. Stokes scored the only goal of the game, placing his shot accurately into the corner of the net past Alex Stepney in the United goal. Initial thoughts were that he was offside but replays indicate that he was not. The result remains Saints' highest success as a club. He won a new car for scoring the first goal in the cup final but he was the only non-driver in the squad and still lived with his parents.

=== Post-1976 ===
During 1976–77, his final season with Southampton, Stokes made only 11 appearances and scored once. He left Saints with the club still in the Football League Second Division to join their South Coast rivals, and his hometown club, Portsmouth.

At the age of 26, Stokes moved over to the US to play for Washington Diplomats. He played alongside fellow imports Jim Steele, his teammate in the 1976 final, Tommy O'Hara, Wim Jansen and Johan Cruyff. Over the next two years, he would spend his summers in Washington whilst spending his winters on loan to English non-league clubs Dartford in 1978 and Cheltenham Town in 1979. Upon returning to England he later played non-league football with Chichester City, Waterlooville, Whitchurch United and Petersfield United before retiring from playing.

== After football ==
Besides a brief stint with Old Simmarians, there was no move into coaching or management for Stokes. By 1981, Stokes was running the Manor House pub in Cosham. He took an active interest in horse racing and remained a popular and well respected figure all along the south coast. The pub was not a success though and Stokes took a job in the Harbour View Cafe belonging to his cousin down at The Hard in Portsmouth. In 1994, he was granted a testimonial year by Southampton FC. He died on 30 May 1995, aged 44, after contracting bronchial pneumonia, on the same day as Ted Drake, another footballer who started his professional career at Southampton. He has been honoured by having one of the luxury hospitality suites at the St Mary's Stadium named after him, and Stokes Court, one of the buildings on the site of Southampton's former ground, The Dell.

== Honours ==
Southampton

- FA Cup: 1975–76
