= 1981–82 Hamburger SV season =

Hamburger SV
1981–82 season
- Manager: Ernst Happel
- Stadium: Volksparkstadion
- Bundesliga: 1st
- DFB-Pokal: Semi-finals
- UEFA Cup: Runners-up
- Top goalscorer: League: Horst Hrubesch (27); All: Horst Hrubesch (37)
- Average home league attendance: 34,700

The 1981–82 Hamburger SV season was the 35th season in the club's history and the 19th consecutive season playing in the Bundesliga.

== Season summary ==
In 1981, Austrian coach Ernst Happel was appointed as former manager Branko Zebec's permanent replacement. Under Happel in the 1981–82 season, HSV managed to regain the Bundesliga title and reach the final of the UEFA Cup, where they lost 4–0 on aggregate to Sweden's IFK Göteborg.

Starting with a win against Borussia Dortmund on 30 January 1982, HSV went on a 36 match undefeated run in the Bundesliga which stretched into the following season. This remained a Bundesliga record until November 2013, when it was broken by Bayern Munich.

Hamburg also equalled the record of suffering no home losses in a 34-match Bundesliga season, a feat they repeated on their way to winning the league title again in the following season.

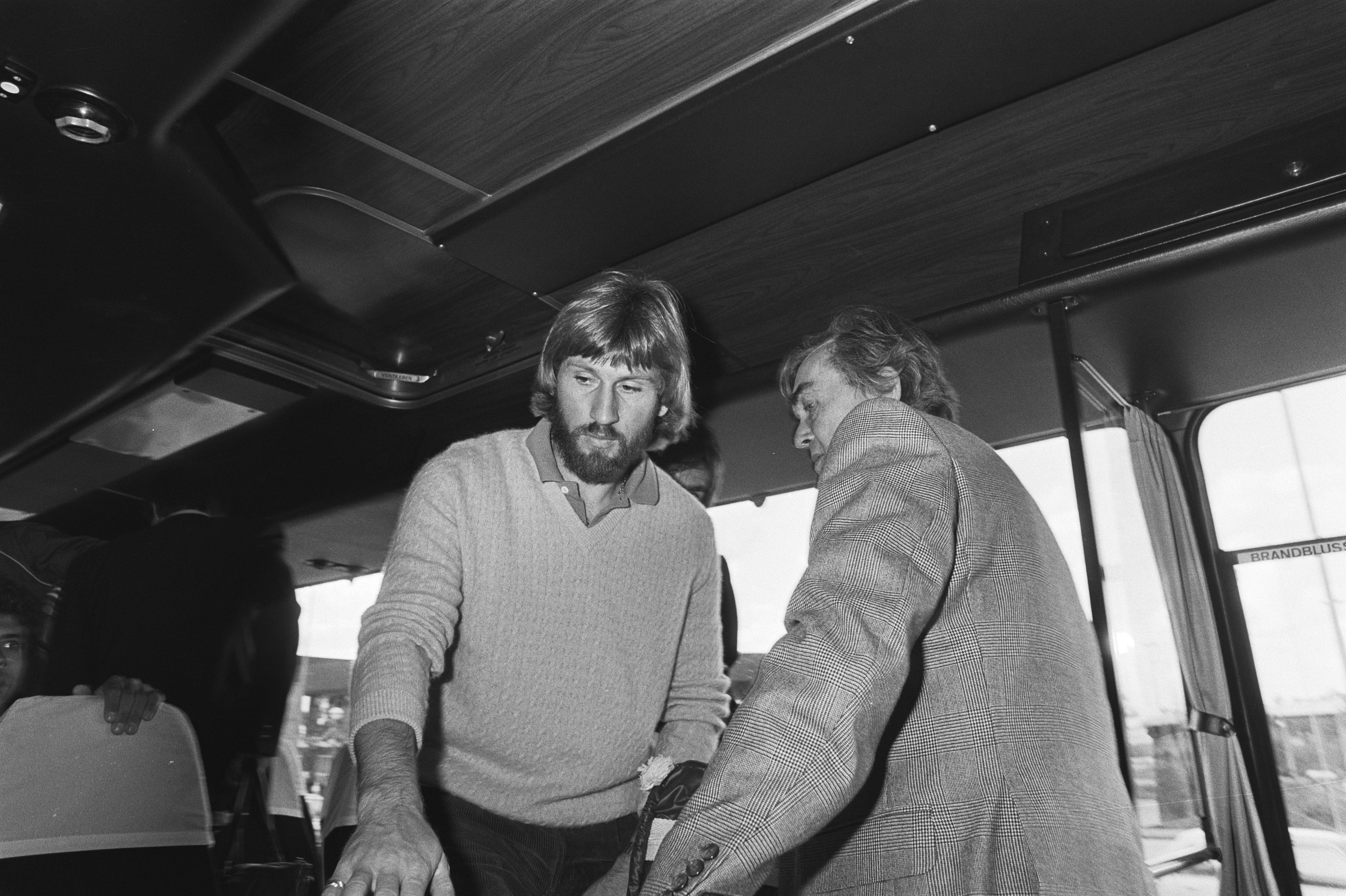
Manager Ernst Happel with Manfred Kaltz in September 1982

== Squad ==
Hamburger SV
Goalkeeper: Uli Stein (34).

Defenders: Ditmar Jakobs (33 / 4); Manfred Kaltz (32 / 9); Jürgen Groh (32); Holger Hieronymus (28 / 1); Franz Beckenbauer (10); Peter Hidien (2).
Midfielders: Bernd Wehmeyer (34 / 1); Jimmy Hartwig (31 / 14); Felix Magath (28 / 8); Caspar Memering (23 / 1); Michael Schröder (1).
Forwards: Lars Bastrup (Denmark) (34 / 13); Horst Hrubesch (captain; 32 / 27); Jürgen Milewski (23 / 10); Thomas von Heesen (20 / 7); Boriša Đorđević (Socialist Federal Republic of Yugoslavia) (7); Werner Dreßel (1); Dieter Kramer (1).
(league appearances and goals listed in brackets)

Manager: Ernst Happel (Austria) .

On the roster but did not appear in a Bundesliga match: Heinz-Josef Koitka; Bernhard Scharold; Ralf Brunnecker.

== Competitions ==
=== Overview ===
Competition	First match	Last match	Starting round	Final position	Record							
Competition	First match	Last match	Starting round	Final position	Pld	W	D	L	GF	GA	GD	Win %
Bundesliga	8 August 1982	29 May 1983	Matchday 1	Winners	34	18	12	4	95	45	+50	52.94
DFB-Pokal	29 August 1982	10 April 1983	First round	Semi-finals	6	5	0	1	20	7	+13	83.33
UEFA Cup	16 September 1982	19 May 1983	First round	Runners-up	12	5	1	6	23	18	+5	41.67
Total					52	28	13	11	138	70	+68	53.85

Source: World Football

=== Bundesliga ===
==== League table ====
Pos	Team	Pld	W	D	L	GF	GA	GD	Pts	Qualification or relegation
1	Hamburger SV (C)	34	18	12	4	95	45	+50	48	Qualification to European Cup first round
2	1. FC Köln	34	18	9	7	72	38	+34	45	Qualification to UEFA Cup first round (Note: As Bayern Munich qualified for the Cup Winners' Cup, their UEFA Cup spot was transferred to Borussia Dortmund.)
3	Bayern Munich	34	20	3	11	77	56	+21	43	Qualification to Cup Winners' Cup first round
4	1. FC Kaiserslautern	34	16	10	8	70	61	+9	42	Qualification to UEFA Cup first round
5	Werder Bremen	34	17	8	9	61	52	+9	42	Qualification to UEFA Cup first round

Source: www.dfb.de
Rules for classification: 1) points; 2) goal difference; 3) number of goals scored.
(C) Champions
Notes:

Aug 8, 1981 1	Hamburger SV	4-2	Eintracht Braunschweig	Hamburg
15:30	Hrubesch 8', 40'; Bastrup 21'; Milewski 54'		Zavišić 6'; Bruns 39'	Stadium: Volksparkstadion; Attendance: 43,000; Referee: Karl-Heinz Tritschler

Aug 15, 1981 2	Kaiserslautern	1-1	Hamburger SV	Kaiserslautern
15:30	Funkel 61'		Magath 10'	Stadium: Betzenbergstadion; Attendance: 29,754; Referee: Karl-Josef Assenmacher

Aug 22, 1981 3	Hamburger SV	2-2	Borussia Dortmund	Hamburg
15:30	Bastrup 49'; Hartwig 75'		Burgsmüller 23'; Rüssmann 45'	Stadium: Volksparkstadion; Attendance: 33,500; Referee: Max Klauser

Aug 26, 1981 4	Nürnberg	0-3	Hamburger SV	Nuremberg
20:00			Hrubesch 55'; Magath 64'; Jakobs 88'	Stadium: Max-Morlock-Stadion; Attendance: 40,000; Referee: Dieter Pauly

Sep 5, 1981 5	Hamburger SV	3–1	Köln	Hamburg
15:30	Hrubesch 55'; Bastrup 65'; Milewski 82'		Littbarski 46'	Stadium: Volksparkstadion; Attendance: 41,300; Referee: Günter Linn

Sep 12, 1981 6	Eintracht Frankfurt	3-2	Hamburger SV	Frankfurt
15:30	Bum-kun 40'; Nachtweih 68'; Borchers 84'		Hartwig 42', 43'	Stadium: Deutsche Bank Park; Attendance: 40,000; Referee: Gerd Hennig

Sep 19, 1981 7	VfL Bochum	2-1	Hamburger SV	Bochum
15:30	Lameck 40'; Abel 71' (pen.)		Hrubesch 19'	Stadium: Vonovia Ruhrstadion; Attendance: 35,000; Referee: Werner Föckler

Sep 26, 1981 8	Hamburger SV	7-0	MSV Duisburg	Hamburg
15:30	Kaltz 13' (pen.), 72' (pen.); Magath 44'; Milewski 15', 48'; Bastrup 70' von Heesen 85'			Stadium: Volksparkstadion; Attendance: 17,000; Referee: Adolf Ermer

3 Oct, 1981 9	VfB Stuttgart	1-2	Hamburger SV	Stuttgart
15:30	Förster 36'		Milewski 70'; Bastrup 89'	Stadium: Gottlieb-Daimler-Stadion; Attendance: 37,600; Referee: Dieter Stäglich

Oct 17, 1981 10	Hamburger SV	1-1	Borussia Mönchengladbach	Hamburg
15:30	Hrubesch 79'		Pinkall 88'	Stadium: Volksparkstadion; Attendance: 53,000; Referee: Aron Schmidhuber

Oct 24, 1981 11	Arminia Bielefeld	1-1	Hamburger SV	Bielefeld
15:30	Schock 5'		Milewski 51'	Stadium: Schüco Arena; Attendance: 30,000; Referee: Walter Engel

Oct 31, 1981 12	Hamburger SV	4-1	Bayern Munich	Hamburg
15:30	Hrubesch 47', 84'; Jakobs 65'; Bastrup 87'		Kraus 17'	Stadium: Volksparkstadion; Attendance: 61,500; Referee: Wolf-Dieter Ahlenfelder

Nov 7, 1981 13	Bayer Leverkusen	0-3	Hamburger SV	Leverkusen
15:30			Hartwig 8', 80'; Hrubesch 38'	Stadium: Ulrich-Haberland-Stadion; Attendance: 17,000; Referee: Werner Roß

Nov 14, 1981 14	Hamburger SV	6-1	Darmstadt 98	Hamburg
15:30	Hartwig 4'; Magah 10'; Hrubesch 28'; Milewski 35'; Jakobs 65'; Hieronymus 76'		Cestonaro 78'	Stadium: Volksparkstadion; Attendance: 43,000; Referee: Uwe Kasperowski

Nov 28, 1981 15	Werder Bremen	3-2	Hamburger SV	Bremen
15:30	Reinders 6', 8'; Kostedde 68'		Bastrup 25'; Magath 87'	Stadium: Wohninvest-Weserstadion; Attendance: 40,000; Referee: Dieter Niebergall

Feb 2, 1982 16	Hamburger SV	6-1	Fortuna Düsseldorf	Hamburg
20:00	Milewski 4'; Hrubesch 11', 26', 69', 87'; Hartwig 55'		Edvaldsson 3'	Stadium: Volksparkstadion; Attendance: 19,500; Referee: Volker Huster

Mar 9, 1982 17	Karlsruher SC	2-2	Hamburger SV	Karlsruhe
20:00	Groß 12'; Schüler 71'		Hartwig 31' von Heesen 69'	Stadium: BBBank Wildpark; Attendance: 47,000; Referee: Günter Risse

Jan 16, 1982 18	Eintracht Braunschweig	2-1	Hamburger SV	Braunschweig
3:30 PM	Pahl 71'; Worm 84'		Bastrup 68'	Stadium: EINTRACHT-Stadion; Attendance: 30,062; Referee: Walter Eschweiler

Apr 30, 1982 19	Hamburger SV	4-0	Kaiserslautern	Hamburg
20:00	Bastrup 7'; Hrubesch 63'; Wehmeyer 86' von Heesen 89'			Stadium: Volksparkstadion; Attendance: 27,300; Referee: Karl-Josef Assenmacher

Jan 30, 1982 20	Borussia Dortmund	2-3	Hamburger SV	Dortmund
15:30	Keser 17'; Burgsmüller 40'		Bastrup 51', 65'; Hrubesch 82'	Stadium: Westfalenstadion; Attendance: 51,000; Referee: Aron Schmidhuber

Feb 6, 1982 21	Hamburger SV	6-1	Nürnberg	Hamburg
15:30	Hartwig 2'; Milewski 40'; Memering 42'; Magath 57', 65'; Hrubesch 81' (pen.)		Heck 76'	Stadium: Volksparkstadion; Attendance: 21,500; Referee: Manfred Uhlig

Feb 13, 1982 22	Köln	1-1	Hamburger SV	Cologne
15:30	Bonhof 57' (pen.)		Kaltz 33' (pen.)	Stadium: RheinEnergieStadion; Attendance: 56,000; Referee: Günter Linn

Feb 27, 1982 23	Hamburger SV	2-0	Eintracht Frankfurt	Hamburg
15:30	Hartwig 68'; Bastrup 77'			Stadium: Volksparkstadion; Attendance: 32,000; Referee: Dieter Niebergall

Mar 6, 1982 24	Hamburger SV	2-2	VfL Bochum	Hamburg
15:30	von Heesen 23'; Kaltz 67' (pen.)		Oswald 81'; Schreier 85'	Stadium: Volksparkstadion; Attendance: 17,500; Referee: Siegfried Brehm

Mar 13, 1982 25	MSV Duisburg	1-2	Hamburger SV	Duisburg
15:30	Seliger 89'		Hartwig 33'; Kaltz 54' (pen.)	Stadium: Wedaustadion; Attendance: 19,000; Referee: Karl-Heinz Tritschler

Mar 31, 1982 26	Hamburger SV	1–1	VfB Stuttgart	Hamburg
20:00	Hrubesch 23'		Hadewicz 55'	Stadium: Volksparkstadion; Attendance: 35,000; Referee: Walter Eschweiler

Apr 3, 1982 27	Borussia Mönchengladbach	1-3	Hamburger SV	Mönchengladbach
15:30	Pinkall 39'		Milewski 22'; Hrubesch 37' von Heesen 79'	Stadium: Bökelberg; Attendance: 35,184; Referee: Winfried Walz

Apr 17, 1982 28	Hamburger SV	3-1	Arminia Bielefeld	Hamburg
15:30	Kaltz 45' (pen.), 63' (pen.) von Heesen 83'		Dronia 32'	Stadium: Volksparkstadion; Attendance: 23,000; Referee: Peter Corell

Apr 24, 1982 29	Bayern Munich	3-4	Hamburger SV	Munich
15:30	Hoeneß 23', 64'; Horsmann 36'		Hartwig 33' von Heesen 70'; Hrubesch 76', 90'	Stadium: Munich Olympic Stadium; Attendance: 78,000; Referee: Werner Föckler

Apr 27, 1982 30	Hamburger SV	0-0	Bayer Leverkusen	Hamburg
15:30				Stadium: Volksparkstadion; Attendance: 18,400; Referee: Jürgen Messmer

May 8, 1982 31	Darmstadt 98	2-2	Hamburger SV	Darmstadt
15:30	Cestonaro 23', 86'		Hartwig 26'; Kaltz 73' (pen.)	Stadium: Merck-Stadion am Böllenfalltor; Attendance: 20,000; Referee: Günter Risse

May 15, 1982 32	Hamburger SV	5-0	Werder Bremen	Hamburg
15:30	Hrubesch 40', 51', 67'; Magath 48'; Bastrup 73'			Stadium: Volksparkstadion; Attendance: 53,400; Referee: Jan Redelfs

May 22, 1982 33	Fortuna Düsseldorf	3–3	Hamburger SV	Düsseldorf
15:30	Edvaldsson 10'; Fach 74'; Allofs 84'		Jakobs 22'; Hrubesch 33', 69'	Stadium: Rheinstadion; Attendance: 31,000; Referee: Franz-Josef Hontheim

May 29, 1982 34	Hamburger SV	3-3	Karlsruher SC	Hamburg
15:30	Hrubesch 20'; Kaltz 26'; Hartwig 27'		Günther 36'; Groß 64'; Bold 81'	Stadium: Volksparkstadion; Attendance: 50,000; Referee: Wolf-Dieter Ahlenfelder

=== DFB Pokal ===
Win	Draw	Loss

Date	Round	Opponent	Venue	Result	Scorers	Attendance	Referee
29 August 1975	First round	Stuttgart Kickers	Away	5–1	Müller (own goal), Hrubesch (3), Magath	14,000	Hontheim
10 October 1975	Second round	Eintracht Trier	Home	2–1	Hieronymus, Bastrup	6,500	Barnick
5 December 1981	Third round	Alemannia Aachen	Away	3–0	Memering, Hieronymus, Hartwig	24,000	Brückner
26 January 1982	Round of 16	Karlsruher SC	Home	6–1	Hrubesch (2), Hartwig, Milewski, Kaltz (2)	6,500	Pauly
20 February 1982	Quarter-finals	SC Göttingen 05	Away	4–2	Schröder (own goal), Bastrup, Milewski, von Heesen	25,000	Walter
10 April 1982	Semi-finals	1. FC Nürnberg	Away	0–2		44,000	Stäglich

=== UEFA Cup ===
==== First round ====
16 September 1981 First leg	Hamburger SV (West Germany)	0–1	(Netherlands) FC Utrecht	Volksparkstadion, Hamburg
20:00			Carbo 79'	Referee: Dušan Krchnak (Czechoslovakia)

30 September 1981 Second leg	FC Utrecht (Netherlands)	3–6 (4–6 agg.)	(West Germany) Hamburger SV	Utrecht
20:00	Carbo 58'; De Kruyk 65' (pen.); Van Veen 78'		Milewski 14', 84'; Wehmeyer 24'; Hartwig 38'; Bastrup 46' von Heesen 61'	Referee: David Richardson (England)

==== Second round ====
21 October 1981 First leg	Bordeaux (France)	2–1	(West Germany) Hamburger SV	Stade Chaban-Delmas, Bordeaux
20:30	Gemmrich 13'; Soler 77'		Kaltz 29' (pen.)	Referee: André Daina (Switzerland

4 November 1981 Second leg	Hamburger SV (West Germany)	2–0 (3–2 agg.)	(France) Bordeaux	Volksparkstadion, Hamburg
20:00	Hrubesch 27', 43'			Referee: Miklos Nagy (Hungary)

==== Third round ====
25 November 1981 First leg	Aberdeen (Scotland)	3–2	(West Germany) Hamburger SV	Pittodrie, Aberdeen
20:30	Black 25'; Hewitt 65', 81'		Hrubesch 51', 87'	Referee: Roger Schoeters (Belgium)

9 December 1981 Second leg	Hamburger SV (West Germany)	3–1 (5–4 agg.)	(Scotland) Aberdeen	Volksparkstadion, Hamburg
20:00	Hrubesch 33'; Memering 59'; Jakobs 67'		McGhee 79'	Referee: Romualdas Yushka (Soviet Union)

==== Quarter-final ====
3 March 1982 First leg	Hamburger SV (West Germany)	3–2	(Switzerland) Neuchâtel Xamax	Volksparkstadion, Hamburg
20:00	Bastrup 32'; Memering 71'; Von Heesen 75'		Givens 36'; Lüthi 52'	Referee: Anders Mattsson (Finland)

17 March 1982 Second leg	Neuchâtel Xamax (Switzerland)	0–0 (2–3 agg.)	(West Germany) Hamburger SV	Stade de la Maladière, Neuchâtel
20:00				Referee: Alojzy Jarguz (Poland)

==== Semi-final ====
7 April 1982 First leg	Radnički Niš (Socialist Federal Republic of Yugoslavia)	2–1	(West Germany) Hamburger SV	Čair Stadium, Niš
16:00	Beganović 49'; Obradović 78'		von Heesen 57'	Referee: Luigi Agnolin (Italy)

21 April 1982 Second leg	Hamburger SV (West Germany)	5–1 (6–3 agg.)	(Socialist Federal Republic of Yugoslavia) Radnički Niš	Volksparkstadion, Hamburg
16:00	Hartwig 7', 30'; Von Heesen 21', 49'; Magath 58'		Panajotović 84'	Referee: André Daina (Switzerland)

==== Final ====
5 May 1982 First leg	IFK Göteborg (Sweden)	1–0	(West Germany) Hamburger SV	Ullevi, Gothenburg
19:00	Holmgren 88'			Attendance: 42,548; Referee: John Carpenter (Republic of Ireland)

19 May 1982 Second leg	Hamburger SV (West Germany)	0–3 (0–4 agg.)	(Sweden) IFK Göteborg	Volksparkstadion, Hamburg
19:00			Corneliusson 25'; Nilsson 61'; Fredriksson 65' (pen.)	Attendance: 57,312; Referee: George Courtney (England)
