= 1982–83 Hamburger SV season =

Hamburger SV
1982–83 season
- Manager: Ernst Happel
- Stadium: Volksparkstadion
- Bundesliga: 1st
- DFB-Pokal: Round of 16
- European Cup: Winners
- Top goalscorer: League: Horst Hrubesch (18); All: Horst Hrubesch (20)
- Average home league attendance: 28,583

The 1982–83 Hamburger SV season was the 36th season in the club's history and the 20th consecutive season playing in the Bundesliga.

== Season summary ==
The 1982–83 campaign is considered as the greatest in the history of the club, as Hamburg finished first in the league on goal difference, after being level on points with local rivals Werder Bremen. It was the club's first consecutive league title and successive third overall. In May, HSV recorded its greatest ever success, winning the European Cup for the first time, after a 1–0 win over Italian champions Juventus in the final in Athens. This ended a spell of six consecutive seasons of English clubs winning the trophy.

The club also participated in this season's edition of the DFB-Pokal, where they were knocked out by Hertha BSC in the round of 16.

Under manager Ernst Happel, Hamburg would go on an unbeaten streak of 36 matches which began during the previous season, on 30 January 1982, and ended on 29 January 1983. The run remained a Bundesliga record until November 2013, when it was broken by Bayern Munich.

Hamburg would also equal the record of suffering no home losses in a 34-match Bundesliga season, a feat the club had also accomplished under Happel in the previous season.

== Squad ==
Hamburger SV
Goalkeeper: Uli Stein (34).

Defenders: Holger Hieronymus (32 / 3); Manfred Kaltz (31 / 8); Ditmar Jakobs (31 / 5); Jürgen Groh (31); Michael Schröder (2); Michael Schmidt (1).
Midfielders: Felix Magath (34 / 4); Bernd Wehmeyer (34 / 2); Wolfgang Rolff (32 / 4); Jimmy Hartwig (31 / 6); Allan Hansen (Denmark) (13 / 3).
Forwards: Jürgen Milewski (31 / 14); Horst Hrubesch (captain; 30 / 18); Lars Bastrup (Denmark) (25 / 5); Thomas von Heesen (20 / 6); Boriša Đorđević (Socialist Federal Republic of Yugoslavia) (2).
(league appearances and goals listed in brackets)

Manager: Ernst Happel (Austria) .

On the roster but did not play in a Bundesliga game: Uwe Hain; Dieter Brefort; Ralf Brunnecker.

== Competitions ==
=== Overview ===
Competition	First match	Last match	Starting round	Final position	Record							
Competition	First match	Last match	Starting round	Final position	Pld	W	D	L	GF	GA	GD	Win %
Bundesliga	3 August 1982	16 May 1983	Matchday 1	Winners	34	20	12	2	79	33	+46	58.82
DFB-Pokal	27 August 1982	17 December 1982	First round	Round of 16	4	2	1	1	10	5	+5	50.00
European Cup	11 September 1982	10 May 1983	First round	Winners	9	6	2	1	16	5	+11	66.67
Total					47	28	15	4	105	43	+62	59.57

Source: World Football

=== Bundesliga ===
==== League table ====
Pos	Team	Pld	W	D	L	GF	GA	GD	Pts	Qualification or relegation
1	Hamburger SV (C)	34	20	12	2	79	33	+46	52	Qualification to European Cup first round
2	Werder Bremen	34	23	6	5	76	38	+38	52	Qualification to UEFA Cup first round (Note: As 1. FC Köln qualified for the Cup Winners' Cup, their UEFA Cup spot was transferred to Kaiserslautern.)
3	VfB Stuttgart	34	20	8	6	80	47	+33	48	Qualification to UEFA Cup first round
4	Bayern Munich	34	17	10	7	74	33	+41	44	Qualification to UEFA Cup first round
5	1. FC Köln	34	17	9	8	69	42	+27	43	Qualification to Cup Winners' Cup first round

Source: www.dfb.de
Rules for classification: 1) points; 2) goal difference; 3) number of goals scored.
(C) Champions
Notes:

21 August 1982 1	Nürnberg	2–2	Hamburger SV	Nuremberg
15:30	Dreßel 13'; Weyreich 74'		Kaltz 11'; Jakobs 35'	Stadium: Städtisches Stadion; Attendance: 41,500; Referee: Karl-Josef Assenmacher

25 August 1982 2	Hamburger SV	1–1	Werder Bremen	Hamburg
20:00	Jakobs 22'		Völler 5'	Stadium: Volksparkstadion; Attendance: 25,000; Referee: Volker Roth

7 September 1982 3	Fortuna Düsseldorf	0–6	Hamburger SV	Düsseldorf
20:00			Magath 37'; Hartwig 38'; Wehmeyer 43'; Milewski 57'; Hansen 77', 90+1'	Stadium: Rheinstadion; Attendance: 13,000; Referee: Franz-Josef Hontheim

4 September 1982 4	Hamburger SV	4–0	Karlsruher SC	Hamburg
15:30	Milewski 9'; Bastrup 31'; Hieronymus 36' von Heesen 79'			Stadium: Volksparkstadion; Attendance: 18,000; Referee: Hans Wahmann

10 September 1982 5	Bayer Leverkusen	0–1	Hamburger SV	Leverkusen
20:00			Hartwig 90'	Stadium: Ulrich-Haberland-Stadion; Attendance: 10,000; Referee: Adolf Ermer

18 September 1982 6	Hamburger SV	3–1	Arminia Bielefeld	Hamburg
15:30	Milewski 5', 64'; Hansen 25'		Schröder 8'	Stadium: Volksparkstadion; Attendance: 20,000; Referee: Hans Peter-Dellwing

25 September 1982 7	Eintracht Frankfurt	1–1	Hamburger SV	Frankfurt
15:30	Bum-kun 3'		Bastrup 81'	Stadium: Waldstadion; Attendance: 35,000; Referee: Günter Risse

2 October 1982 8	Hamburger SV	0–0	VfL Bochum	Hamburg
15:30				Stadium: Volksparkstadion; Attendance: 17,000; Referee: Manfred Neuner

9 October 1982 9	Bayern Munich	2–2	Hamburger SV	Munich
15:30	Breitner 49' (pen.); Rummenigge 65'		Milewski 27'; Hrubesch 29'	Stadium: Olympiastadion; Attendance: 72,000; Referee: Walter Eschweiler

23 October 1982 10	Hamburger SV	4–0	Eintracht Braunschweig	Hamburg
15:30	Jakobs 25'; Milewski 39'; Kaltz 71' (pen.); Hrubesch 80'			Stadium: Volksparkstadion; Attendance: 21,000; Referee: Manfred Uhlig

30 October 1982 11	Hamburger SV	4–3	Borussia Mönchengladbach	Hamburg
15:30	Milewski 7', 20' von Heesen 41'; Rolff 53'		Rahn 1'; Mill 43'; Kaltz 75' (o.g.)	Stadium: Volksparkstadion; Attendance: 35,500; Referee: Norbert Brückner

6 November 1982 12	VfB Stuttgart	1–2	Hamburger SV	Stuttgart
15:30	Six 70'		Hrubesch 38', 43'	Stadium: Neckarstadion; Attendance: 62,100; Referee: Dieter Stäglich

13 November 1982 13	Hamburger SV	1–1	Hertha BSC	Hamburg
15:30	Hrubesch 86'		Remark 56'	Stadium: Volksparkstadion; Attendance: 22,500; Referee: Dieter Pauly

20 November 1982 14	Köln	1–1	Hamburger SV	Cologne
15:30	Engels 41'		Magath 43'	Stadium: Müngersdorfer Stadion; Attendance: 52,000; Referee: Dieter Niebergall

27 November 1982 15	Hamburger SV	1–1	Kaiserslautern	Hamburg
15:30	von Heesen 74'		Brehme 67'	Stadium: Volksparkstadion; Attendance: 30,000; Referee: Jakob Wippker

4 December 1982 16	Borussia Dortmund	1–3	Hamburger SV	Dortmund
15:30	Abramczik 19'		Milewski 13'; Hrubesch 45', 62'	Stadium: Westfalenstadion; Attendance: 54,000; Referee: Siegfried Brehm

11 December 1982 17	Hamburger SV	6–2	Schalke 04	Hamburg
15:30	Magath 5'; Hrubesch 26', 77'; Wehmeyer 56'; Milewski 71' von Heesen 74'		Wuttke 30', 82'	Stadium: Volksparkstadion; Attendance: 23,600; Referee: Adolf Ermer

22 January 1983 18	Hamburger SV	3–0	Nürnberg	Hamburg
15:30	Hrubesch 32'; Kaltz 37' (pen.); Hieronymus 43'			Stadium: Volksparkstadion; Attendance: 19,000; Referee: Wolf-Dieter Ahlenfelder

29 January 1983 19	Werder Bremen	3–2	Hamburger SV	Bremen
15:30	Völler 43'; Neubarth 45'; Möhlmann 65'		Bastrup 49'; Jakobs 87'	Stadium: Weserstadion; Attendance: 40,000; Referee: Jürgen Meßmer

8 March 1983 20	Hamburger SV	2–0	Fortuna Düsseldorf	Hamburg
20:00	von Heesen 8'; Hieronymus 74'			Stadium: Volksparkstadion; Attendance: 15,000; Referee: Winfried Walz

19 February 1983 21	Karlsruher SC	1–2	Hamburger SV	Karlsruhe
15:30	Zahn 72'		Bastrup 44', 75'	Stadium: Wildsparkstadion; Attendance: 30,000; Referee: Karl-Josef Assenmacher

13 February 1983 22	Hamburger SV	3–0	Bayer Leverkusen	Hamburg
15:30	Hrubesch 13'; Rolff 69'; Kaltz 73'			Stadium: Volksparkstadion; Attendance: 15,800; Referee: Max Klauser

5 March 1983 23	Arminia Bielefeld	2–0	Hamburger SV	Bielefeld
15:30	Grillemeier 23'; Pagelsdorf 86'			Stadium: Stadion Alm; Attendance: 25,000; Referee: Dieter Stäglich

12 March 1983 24	Hamburger SV	3–0	Eintracht Frankfurt	Hamburg
15:30	Milewski 5', 45'; Hrubesch 90'			Stadium: Volksparkstadion; Attendance: 26,000; Referee: Peter Gabor

19 March 1983 25	VfL Bochum	1–1	Hamburger SV	Bochum
15:30	Patzke 61'		Hartwig 22'	Stadium: Ruhrstadion; Attendance: 22,000; Referee: Walter Engel

26 March 1983 26	Hamburger SV	1–1	Bayern Munich	Hamburg
15:30	Kaltz 38' (pen.)		Breitner 52'	Stadium: Volksparkstadion; Attendance: 61,000; Referee: Dieter Pauly

9 April 1983 27	Eintracht Braunschweig	2–4	Hamburger SV	Braunschweig
15:30	Worm 10'; Borg 84'		Borg 9' (o.g.); Jakobs 28'; Hrubesch 31', 78'	Stadium: Stadion an der Hamburger Straße; Attendance: 28,000; Referee: Werner Föckler

16 April 1983 28	Borussia Mönchengladbach	1–1	Hamburger SV	Mönchengladbach
15:30	Matthäus 86'		Hrubesch 84'	Stadium: Bökelbergstadion; Attendance: 27,9000; Referee: Manfred Neuner

30 April 1983 29	Hamburger SV	2–0	VfB Stuttgart	Hamburg
15:30	von Heesen 58'; Magath 67'			Stadium: Volksparkstadion; Attendance: 33,000; Referee: Dieter Niebergall

6 May 1983 30	Hertha BSC	1–2	Hamburger SV	Berlin
20:00	Schneider 25' (pen.)		Rolff 39'; Hartwig 68'	Stadium: Olympiastadion; Attendance: 36,336; Referee: Wolf-Dieter Ahlenfelder

14 May 1983 31	Hamburger SV	2–1	Köln	Hamburg
15:30	Hartwig 39', 76'		Littbarski 75'	Stadium: Volksparkstadion; Attendance: 49,800; Referee: Siegfried Brehm

24 May 1983 32	Kaiserslautern	2–2	Hamburger SV	Kaiserslautern
15:30	Briegel 57'; Kitzmann 59'		Kaltz 55' (pen.); Milewski 66'	Stadium: Stadion Betzenberg; Attendance: 33,000; Referee: Walter Eschweiler

28 May 1983 33	Hamburger SV	5–0	Borussia Dortmund	Hamburg
15:30	Hrubesch 23', 32'; Milewski 37'; Kaltz 69' (pen.), 73' (pen.)			Stadium: Volksparkstadion; Attendance: 51,300; Referee: Klaus Clajus

4 June 1983 34	Schalke 04	1–2	Hamburger SV	Gelsenkirchen
15:30	Wuttke 44'		Hrubesch 39'; Rolff 52'	Stadium: Parkstadion; Attendance: 70,300; Referee: Hans-Peter Dellwing

=== DFB Pokal ===
27 August 1982 First round	MSV Duisburg	1–1	Hamburg	Wedaustadion, Duisburg

10 October 1982 First round replay	Hamburg	5–0	MSV Duisburg	Volksparkstadion, Hamburg

15 October 1982 Second round	Hamburg	3–2	Werder Bremen	Volksparkstadion, Hamburg

17 December 1982 Round of 16	Hertha BSC	2–1	Hamburg	Olympiastadion, Berlin

=== European Cup ===
By winning the Bundesliga in 1981–82, HSV qualified for Europe's premier club competition. Their campaign began with an all-German affair, as Hamburg faced the champions from the communist East, BFC Dynamo, in mid-September 1982. After the two sides had played to a 1–1 draw in East Berlin, HSV advanced with a 2–0 win at home in the Volksparkstadion. HSV then went on to beat Olympiacos, Dynamo Kyiv and Real Sociedad on their way to the final against Juventus in Athens. A single goal from Felix Magath eight minutes into the game was enough for Hamburg to claim the title as goalkeeper Uli Stein made a series of important saves in the second half. It was the sixth consecutive European Cup Final to finish with a 1–0 scoreline.

==== First round ====
15 September 1982 First leg	BFC Dynamo (East Germany)	1–1	(West Germany) Hamburg	Friedrich-Ludwig-Jahn-Stadion, East Berlin
	Riediger 17'	Report	Milewski 37'	Attendance: 22,000; Referee: Jan Keizer (Netherlands)

29 September 1982 Second leg	Hamburg (West Germany)	2–0 (3–1 agg.)	(East Germany) BFC Dynamo	Volksparkstadion, Hamburg
	Hartwig 33'; Hrubesch 88'	Report		Attendance: 35,000; Referee: Keith Hackett (England)

==== Second round ====
20 October 1982 First leg	Hamburg (West Germany)	1–0	(Greece) Olympiacos	Volksparkstadion, Hamburg
	Von Heesen 56'	Report		Attendance: 17,000; Referee: Roger Schoeters (Belgium)

3 November 1982 Second leg	Olympiacos (Greece)	0–4 (0–5 agg.)	(West Germany) Hamburg	Olympic Stadium, Athens
		Report	Magath 26'; Hrubesch 51'; Rolff 53'; Bastrup 85'	Attendance: 75,223; Referee: Brian McGinlay (Scotland)

==== Quarter-final ====
2 March 1983 First leg	Dynamo Kyiv (Soviet Union)	0–3	(West Germany) Hamburg	Vladimir Lenin Stadium, Tbilisi (Note: Dynamo Kyiv played their home match at Vladimir Lenin Stadium, Tbilisi, instead of their regular stadium Republican Stadium, Kyiv, due to weather conditions.)
19:00		Report	Bastrup 4', 52', 70'	Attendance: 27,000; Referee: Enzo Barbaresco (Italy)

16 March 1983 Second leg	Hamburg (West Germany)	1–2 (4–2 agg.)	(Soviet Union) Dynamo Kyiv	Volksparkstadion, Hamburg
20:00	Hartwig 61'	Report	Bezsonov 52'; Yevtushenko 82'	Attendance: 50,000; Referee: Rolf Ericsson (Sweden)

==== Semi-final ====
6 April 1983 First leg	Real Sociedad (Spain)	1–1	(West Germany) Hamburg	Estadio de Atocha, San Sebastián
	Gajate 74'	Report	Rolff 58'	Attendance: 26,900; Referee: Michel Vautrot (France)

20 April 1983 Second leg	Hamburg (West Germany)	2–1 (3–2 agg.)	(Spain) Real Sociedad	Volksparkstadion, Hamburg
	Jakobs 75' von Heesen 84'	Report	Álvarez 80'	Attendance: 51,000; Referee: Bruno Galler (Switzerland)

==== Final ====
25 May 1983 Final	Hamburg (West Germany)	1–0	(Italy) Juventus	Olympic Stadium, Athens
	Magath 8'	Report		Attendance: 73,500; Referee: Nicolae Rainea (Romania)
