= 1981–82 Eintracht Frankfurt season =

Eintracht Frankfurt
1981–82 season
- Chairman: Axel Schander
- Manager: Lothar Buchmann
- Bundesliga: 8th
- DFB-Pokal: 2nd Round
- UEFA Cup: Quarter-finals
- Top goalscorer: League: Cha Bum-kun and Norbert Nachtweih (11 goals each); All: Cha Bum-kun and Norbert Nachtweih (12 goals each)
- Highest home attendance: 60,000 17 April 1982 v Bayern Munich (league)
- Lowest home attendance: 7,000 15 May 1982 v Fortuna Düsseldorf (league)
- Average home league attendance: 21,147
Home colours	Away colours

The 1981–82 Eintracht Frankfurt season was the 82nd season in the club's football history. In 1981–82 the club played in the Bundesliga, the top tier of German football. It was the club's 19th season in the Bundesliga.

== Matches ==
=== Legend ===
Win Draw Loss Postponed

=== Friendlies ===
15 July 1981 Tournoi de Paris Semi-final	AS Saint-Étienne (France)	0–0 (a.e.t.) (2–4 p)	(West Germany) Eintracht Frankfurt	Paris, France
18:30 CET		Report		Stadium: Parc des Princes
	Penalties
	Rep (penalty missed); Nielsen (penalty scored); Zanon (penalty scored); Paganelli (penalty missed)		(penalty scored) Lorant; (penalty scored) Nickel; (penalty scored) Nachtweih; (penalty scored) Löw

17 July 1981 Tournoi de Paris final	Paris Saint-Germain (France)	3–1	(West Germany) Eintracht Frankfurt	Paris, France
	Šurjak 38'; Boubacar 40'; Dahleb 63'	Report	Borchers 46'	Stadium: Parc des Princes; Attendance: 25,000; Referee: Quiniou

19 July 1981	FC St. Magrethen (Switzerland) / FC Höchst XI (Austria)	1–6	(West Germany) Eintracht Frankfurt
	Schrothenbaum 70'	Report	Löw 10', 28', 29', 61'; Borchers 19'; Cha Bum-kun 22'	Attendance: 1,800

22 July 1981	FC St. Gallen (Switzerland)	0–1	(West Germany) Eintracht Frankfurt	St. Gallen, Switzerland
		Report	Löw 17'	Attendance: 5,000; Referee: Paggiola

25 July 1981	Eintracht Frankfurt (West Germany)	4–0	(Netherlands) AFC Ajax	Dietzenbach, West Germany
15:30 CET	Körbel 7'; Borchers 21'; Lorant 38' (pen.); Falkenmayer 78'	Report		Stadium: Waldstadion Dietzenbach; Attendance: 5,000; Referee: Föckler

28 July 1981	FSV Frankfurt (West Germany)	1–4	(West Germany) Eintracht Frankfurt	Frankfurt, West Germany
	Julio Álvarez 48'	Report	Nickel 7', 25'; Cha Bum-kun 44'; Anthes 71'	Stadium: Stadion am Bornheimer Hang; Attendance: 8,000; Referee: Engel

1 August 1981	Eintracht Frankfurt (West Germany)	5–7	(West Germany) Karlsruher SC	Mömlingen, West Germany
	Borchers 5', 50'; Körbel 35'; Nickel 53'; Lorant 82'	Report	Schüler 19', 29', 79'; Günther 52', 65', 73'; Trenkel 69'	Attendance: 2,500; Referee: Jupe

2 August 1981	1. FC Eislingen (West Germany)	1–10	(West Germany) Eintracht Frankfurt	West Germany
	Funk 67'	Report	Pezzey; Lottermann; Falkenmayer; Görtz; Karger	Attendance: 2,500

12 August 1981	Hofgeismar XI (West Germany)	1–19	(West Germany) Eintracht Frankfurt	Hofgeismar, West Germany
	Goal	Report	Nachtweih; Nickel; Cha Bum-kun; Borchers; Löw; Körbel; Neuberger; Pezzey	Attendance: 2,500

18 August 1981	AEK Athens (Greece)	1–2	(West Germany) Eintracht Frankfurt	Athens, Greece
21:00 EEST	Ardizoglou 77'	Report	Anthes 55'; Ravousis 83' (o.g.)	Stadium: Nikos Goumas Stadium; Attendance: 12,496; Referee: Makis Germanakos (Greece)

6 October 1981	Israel	0–3	(West Germany) Eintracht Frankfurt	Ramat Gan, Israel
		Report	Nachtweih 47'; Trapp 53'; Cha Bum-kun 75'	Stadium: Ramat Gan Stadium; Attendance: 4,000

21 November 1981	Hertha BSC (West Germany)	2–2	(West Germany) Eintracht Frankfurt	Berlin, West Germany
15:30 CET	Killmeier 29', 50'	Report	Pezzey 73', 85'	Stadium: Olympiastadion; Attendance: 3,772; Referee: Kasperski

23 November 1981	Al-Arabi (Kuwait)	2–1	(West Germany) Eintracht Frankfurt	Kuwait
	Ahmad Halaf (pen.); Ali	Report	Löw (pen.)	Attendance: 3,000

25 November 1981	Al-Nasr (United Arab Emirates)	0–4	(West Germany) Eintracht Frankfurt	Dubai, United Arab Emirates
		Report	Cha Bum-kun; Rudel	Attendance: 5,000

6 December 1981	FC Homburg (West Germany)	1–5	(West Germany) Eintracht Frankfurt	Homburg, West Germany
	Plattek 51'	Report	Borchers 10', 34'; Körbel 32' (pen.); Neuberger 41'; Nachtweih 66' (pen.)	Attendance: 865; Referee: Matheis

8 January 1982	SC Charlottenburg (West Germany)	2–3	(West Germany) Eintracht Frankfurt	West Germany
	Goal	Report	Löw; Cha Bum-kun; Nickel 59'
Note: 30 minutes per half time

16 January 1982	TSV Heusenstamm (West Germany)	0–3	(West Germany) Eintracht Frankfurt	Heusenstamm, West Germany
		Report	Nickel; Löw	Attendance: 200

24 January 1982	Germania Dörnigheim (West Germany)	0–4	(West Germany) Eintracht Frankfurt	Maintal, West Germany
		Report	Nickel; Löw; Falkenmayer; Borchers

2 February 1982	Eintracht Frankfurt (West Germany)	5–1	(West Germany) Kickers Offenbach	West Germany
	Cha Bum-kun 2', 44'; Nickel 19', 82'; Körbel 53'	Report	Bein 25'	Attendance: 2,548

20 March 1982	Hessen Kassel (West Germany)	2–4	(West Germany) Eintracht Frankfurt	Kassel, West Germany
	Pallaks 5'; Hampl 73'	Report	Pezzey 25'; Nachtweih 34', 49', 61'	Attendance: 3,000; Referee: Hellwig

25 May 1982	Kuwait	1–2	(West Germany) Eintracht Frankfurt	Casablanca, Morocco
	75'	Report	Nickel 40'; Anthes 62'	Attendance: 4,000

31 May 1982 75th anniversary of Union Niederrad	Union Niederrad (West Germany)	2–11	(West Germany) Eintracht Frankfurt	Frankfurt, West Germany
	Eckart; Homm	Report	Nickel; Lorant; Künast; Borchers; Falkenmayer; Sziedat	Stadium: Sportplatz an der Heinrich-Seliger-Straße; Attendance: 600

1 June 1982	Teutonia Watzenborn-Steinberg (West Germany)	1–9	(West Germany) Eintracht Frankfurt	Pohlheim, West Germany
	Goal	Report	Künast; Nickel; Pahl; Anthes; Körbel	Attendance: 800

6 June 1982	Germania Leeheim (West Germany)	2–3	(West Germany) Eintracht Frankfurt	Riedstadt, West Germany
	Heeb 52'; Hamann 64'	Report	Nickel 20', 21'; Lorant 58'	Attendance: 1,200; Referee: Zentgraf

8 June 1982	FC St. Wendel (West Germany)	2–12	(West Germany) Eintracht Frankfurt	St. Wendel, West Germany
	Fuchs 50'; Roob 90'	Report	Nachtweih 3', 58'; Nickel 5', 20', 55', 75', 89'; Falkenmayer 6'; Gulich 54', 81'; Künast	Attendance: 1,500

10 June 1982	RSV Würges (West Germany)	2–4	(West Germany) Eintracht Frankfurt	Bad Camberg, West Germany
	Petri 85'; Kratz 90'	Report	Künast 13'; Gulich 25'; Lottermann 37'; Körbel 70'	Attendance: 2,000; Referee: Borbonus

=== Bundesliga ===
==== League fixtures and results ====
8 August 1981 1	Eintracht Frankfurt	2–2	1. FC Kaiserslautern	Frankfurt, West Germany
15:30 CEST	Löw 19'; Körbel 49'	Report	Funkel 73'; Briegel 77'	Stadium: Waldstadion; Attendance: 38,000; Referee: Eschweiler

15 August 1981 2	Borussia Dortmund	0–2	Eintracht Frankfurt	Dortmund, West Germany
15:30 CEST		Report	Borchers 18'; Nachtweih 47'	Stadium: Westfalenstadion; Attendance: 28,000; Referee: Heitmann

22 August 1981 3	Eintracht Frankfurt	3–1	1. FC Nürnberg	Frankfurt, West Germany
15:30 CEST	Nickel 64'; Nachtweih 73'; Anthes 90'	Report	Lieberwirth 88'	Stadium: Waldstadion; Attendance: 19,000; Referee: Huster

26 August 1981 4	1. FC Köln	2–0	Eintracht Frankfurt	Cologne, West Germany
20:00 CEST	Woodcock 65'; Bonhof 79' (pen.)	Report		Stadium: Müngersdorfer Stadion; Attendance: 35,000; Referee: Hontheim

5 September 1981 5	VfL Bochum	3–2	Eintracht Frankfurt	Bochum, West Germany
15:30 CEST	Bittorf 9', 86'; Patzke 45'		Pezzey 16'; Anthes 90'	Stadium: Ruhrstadion; Attendance: 22,000; Referee: Niebergall

12 September 1981 6	Eintracht Frankfurt	3–2	Hamburger SV	Frankfurt, West Germany
15:30 CEST	Cha Bum-kun 40'; Nachtweih 68'; Borchers 84'	Report	Hartwig 42', 43'	Stadium: Waldstadion; Attendance: 40,000; Referee: Hennig

19 September 1981 7	MSV Duisburg	4–2	Eintracht Frankfurt	Duisburg, West Germany
15:30 CEST	Seliger 2'; Fruck 20'; Dietz 40'; Helmes 42'	Report	Nachtweih 67'; Borchers 78'	Stadium: Wedaustadion; Attendance: 10,000; Referee: Luca

26 September 1981 8	Eintracht Frankfurt	4–1	VfB Stuttgart	Frankfurt, West Germany
15:30 CEST	Neuberger 51'; Lorant 56' (pen.), 76' (pen.); Cha Bum-kun 89'	Report	Six 79'	Stadium: Waldstadion; Attendance: 25,000; Referee: Pauly

3 October 1981 9	Borussia Mönchengladbach	1–0	Eintracht Frankfurt	Mönchengladbach, West Germany
15:30 CEST	Otto 20' (o.g.)	Report	Nachtweih (red card) 85'	Stadium: Bökelbergstadion; Attendance: 17,000; Referee: Linn

17 October 1981 10	Eintracht Frankfurt	2–1	Arminia Bielefeld	Frankfurt, West Germany
15:30 CEST	Löw 56'; Körbel 90'	Report	Geils 71'	Stadium: Waldstadion; Attendance: 9,500; Referee: Retzmann

24 October 1981 11	Bayern Munich	3–2	Eintracht Frankfurt	Munich, West Germany
16:00 CEST	Kraus 22'; Rummenigge 33'; Niedermayer 37'	Report	Löw 19'; Lottermann 71'	Stadium: Olympiastadion; Attendance: 28,000; Referee: Messmer

30 October 1981 12	Eintracht Frankfurt	3–1	Bayer Leverkusen	Frankfurt, West Germany
20:00 CEST	Lorant 22' (pen.); Lottermann 62'; Löw 81'	Report	Glowacz 16' (pen.)	Stadium: Waldstadion; Attendance: 9,000; Referee: Tritschler

7 November 1981 13	Darmstadt 98	1–4	Eintracht Frankfurt	Darmstadt, West Germany
14:30 CEST	Mattern 15'	Report	Lottermann 24', 33'; Nickel 72'; Lorant 79'	Stadium: Stadion am Böllenfalltor; Attendance: 25,000; Referee: Assenmacher

14 November 1981 14	Eintracht Frankfurt	9–2	Werder Bremen	Frankfurt, West Germany
15:30 CEST	Nickel 20', 80'; Borchers 24', 40', 43'; Nachtweih 71', 74'; Cha Bum-kun 78', 89'	Report	Meier 7'; Reinders 64'	Stadium: Waldstadion; Attendance: 23,000; Referee: Uhlig

28 November 1981 15	Fortuna Düsseldorf	2–2	Eintracht Frankfurt	Düsseldorf, West Germany
15:30 CEST	Eðvaldsson 67'; Allofs 73'	Report	Künast 82', 85'	Stadium: Rheinstadion; Attendance: 9,500; Referee: Engel

12 December 1981 16	Eintracht Frankfurt	4–1	Karlsruher SC	Frankfurt, West Germany
15:30 CEST	Pezzey 37', 78'; Körbel 66'; Cha Bum-kun 68'	Report	Krauth 41'	Stadium: Waldstadion; Attendance: 15,000; Referee: Roth

16 December 1981 17	Eintracht Braunschweig	4–1	Eintracht Frankfurt	Braunschweig, West Germany
20:00 CEST	Bruns 26'; Pahl 50'; Worm 70'; Grobe 83'	Report	Neuberger 52'	Stadium: Eintracht-Stadion; Attendance: 16,000; Referee: Ahlenfelder

23 January 1982 19	Eintracht Frankfurt	1–4	Borussia Dortmund	Frankfurt, West Germany
15:30 CEST	Rüssmann 6' (o.g.)	Report	Klotz 11'; Burgsmüller 28', 80'; Huber 75'	Stadium: Waldstadion; Attendance: 15,000; Referee: Gabor

6 February 1982 21	Eintracht Frankfurt	4–2	1. FC Köln	Frankfurt, West Germany
15:30 CEST	Nachtweih 26'; Löw 67' (pen.); Falkenmayer 81'; Anthes 89'	Report	Fischer 32'; Pezzey 73' (o.g.)	Stadium: Waldstadion; Attendance: 30,000; Referee: Umbach

13 February 1982 22	Eintracht Frankfurt	0–1	VfL Bochum	Frankfurt, West Germany
15:30 CEST		Report	Schreier 31'	Stadium: Waldstadion; Attendance: 12,000; Referee: Luca

20 February 1982 18	1. FC Kaiserslautern	6–2	Eintracht Frankfurt	Kaiserslautern, West Germany
15:30 CEST	Körbel 42' (o.g.); Briegel 43'; Funkel 61'; Eilenfeldt 83', 88'; Eigendorf 90'	Report	Neuberger 23'; Cha Bum-kun 25'	Stadium: Betzenbergstadion; Attendance: 17,000; Referee: Pauly

27 February 1982 23	Hamburger SV	2–0	Eintracht Frankfurt	Hamburg, West Germany
15:30 CEST	Hartwig 68'; Bastrup 77'	Report		Stadium: Volksparkstadion; Attendance: 32,000; Referee: Niebergall

6 March 1982 24	Eintracht Frankfurt	4–1	MSV Duisburg	Frankfurt, West Germany
15:30 CEST	Cha Bum-kun 24'; Nachtweih 45'; Künast 57'; Lorant 67' (pen.)	Report	Roland Wohlfarth 58'	Stadium: Waldstadion; Attendance: 11,000; Referee: Kasperowski

9 March 1982 20	1. FC Nürnberg	5–3	Eintracht Frankfurt	Nuremberg, West Germany
15:30 CEST	Lieberwirth 17'; Hintermaier 35'; Dreßel 58', 86'; Heck 83'	Report	Borchers 33'; Falkenmayer 63'; Künast 87'	Stadium: Städtisches Stadion; Attendance: 21,500; Referee: Hennig

13 March 1982 25	VfB Stuttgart	5–2	Eintracht Frankfurt	Stuttgart, West Germany
15:30 CEST	Kelsch 28', 54'; Müller 34'; Allgöwer 59'; Reichert 67'	Report	Nachtweih 31'; Nickel 74'	Stadium: Neckarstadion; Attendance: 17,000; Referee: Uhlig

30 March 1982 26	Eintracht Frankfurt	3–0	Borussia Mönchengladbach	Frankfurt, West Germany
20:00 CEST	Falkenmayer 1'; Cha Bum-kun 38', 64'	Report		Stadium: Waldstadion; Attendance: 28,000; Referee: Hontheim

3 April 1982 27	Arminia Bielefeld	3–0	Eintracht Frankfurt	Bielefeld, West Germany
15:30 CEST	Lienen 33'; Schock 86'; Schröder 88'	Report		Stadium: Stadion Alm; Attendance: 26,000; Referee: Assenmacher

17 April 1982 28	Eintracht Frankfurt	4–3	Bayern Munich	Frankfurt, West Germany
15:30 CEST	Nachtweih 16'; Pezzey 23'; Körbel 55'; Künast 86'	Report	Breitner 36'; Rummenigge 46'; Augenthaler 66'	Stadium: Waldstadion; Attendance: 60,000; Referee: Tritschler

24 April 1982 29	Bayer Leverkusen	1–2	Eintracht Frankfurt	Leverkusen, West Germany
15:30 CEST	Szech 5'	Report	Körbel 47'; Lottermann 49'	Stadium: Ulrich-Haberland-Stadion; Attendance: 5,000; Referee: Gabor

28 April 1982 30	Eintracht Frankfurt	2–1	Darmstadt 98	Frankfurt, West Germany
20:00 CEST	Cha Bum-kun 35'; Nachtweih 55'	Report	Vorreiter 71'	Stadium: Waldstadion; Attendance: 10,000; Referee: Stäglich

8 May 1982 31	Werder Bremen	2–1	Eintracht Frankfurt	Bremen, West Germany
15:30 CEST	Siegmann 51'; Rautiainen 83'	Report	Cha Bum-kun 49'	Stadium: Weserstadion; Attendance: 20,000; Referee: Huster

15 May 1982 32	Eintracht Frankfurt	4–0	Fortuna Düsseldorf	Frankfurt, West Germany
15:30 CEST	Dusend 49' (o.g.); Borchers 58', 75'; Nickel 77'	Report		Stadium: Waldstadion; Attendance: 7,000; Referee: Brehm

22 May 1982 33	Karlsruher SC	2–2	Eintracht Frankfurt	Karlsruhe, West Germany
15:30 CEST	Bold 50' (pen.); Boysen 88'	Report	Sziedat 27'; Groß 82' (o.g.)	Stadium: Wildparkstadion; Attendance: 18,000; Referee: Walz

31 May 1982 34	Eintracht Frankfurt	4–2	Eintracht Braunschweig	Frankfurt, West Germany
15:30 CEST	Anthes 26'; Lorant 34', 74'; Nickel 47'	Report	Merkhoffer 50'; Worm 56'	Stadium: Waldstadion; Attendance: 8,000; Referee: Risse

==== League table ====
Pos	Team	Pld	W	D	L	GF	GA	GD	Pts	Qualification or relegation
6	Borussia Dortmund	34	18	5	11	59	40	+19	41	Qualification to UEFA Cup first round (Note: As Bayern Munich qualified for the Cup Winners' Cup, their UEFA Cup spot was transferred to Borussia Dortmund.)
7	Borussia Mönchengladbach	34	15	10	9	61	51	+10	40	
8	Eintracht Frankfurt	34	17	3	14	83	72	+11	37	
9	VfB Stuttgart	34	13	9	12	62	55	+7	35	
10	VfL Bochum	34	12	8	14	52	51	+1	32	

Source: www.dfb.de
Rules for classification: 1) points; 2) goal difference; 3) number of goals scored.

==== Results summary ====
Overall								Home						Away					
Pld	W	D	L	GF	GA	GD	Pts	W	D	L	GF	GA	GD	W	D	L	GF	GA	GD
34	17	3	14	83	72	+11	37	14	1	2	56	26	+30	3	2	12	27	46	−19

Source: Bundesliga

==== Results by round ====
Round	1	2	3	4	5	6	7	8	9	10	11	12	13	14	15	16	17	18	19	20	21	22	23	24	25	26	27	28	29	30	31	32	33	34
Ground	H	A	H	A	A	H	A	H	A	H	A	H	A	H	A	H	A	A	H	A	H	H	A	H	A	H	A	H	A	H	A	H	A	H
Result	D	W	W	L	L	W	L	W	L	W	L	W	W	W	D	W	L	L	L	L	W	L	L	W	L	W	L	W	W	W	L	W	D	W
Position	7	7	4	6	9	8	10	8	9	8	8	6	6	5	5	5	6	6	7	8	7	9	9	8	11	10	11	10	10	9	9	8	8	8

A = Away; H = Home; W = Win; D = Draw; L = Loss

=== DFB-Pokal ===
29 August 1981 1st Round	Eintracht Frankfurt	6–1	BSC Brunsbüttel	Frankfurt, West Germany
	Nachtweih 7'; Anthes 27'; Nickel 43'; Pezzey 45'; Borchers 53'; Lorant 79' (pen.)	Report	Rohwedder 73'	Stadium: Waldstadion; Attendance: 3,000; Referee: Filla

10 October 1981 2nd Round	Fortuna Düsseldorf	3–1	Eintracht Frankfurt	Düsseldorf, West Germany
	Allofs 6'; Bockenfeld 72'; Bommer 85'	Report	Lottermann 25'	Stadium: Rheinstadion; Attendance: 15,000; Referee: Roth

=== European Cup Winners' Cup ===
16 September 1981 1st Round	Eintracht Frankfurt (West Germany)	2–0	(Greece) PAOK	Frankfurt, West Germany
	Pezzey 11'; Körbel 78'	Report		Stadium: Waldstadion; Attendance: 22,000; Referee: Valentine

30 September 1981 1st Round	PAOK (Greece)	2–0 (a.e.t.) (4–5 p)	(West Germany) Eintracht Frankfurt	Thessaloniki, Greece
	Kostikos 38', 60'	Report		Stadium: Toumba Stadium; Attendance: 35,000; Referee: Kuti
	Penalties
	Kostikos (penalty scored); Guerino (penalty scored); Gounaris (penalty scored); Siggas (penalty scored); Dimopoulos (penalty missed)		(penalty scored) Lorant; (penalty scored) Körbel; (penalty scored) Trapp; (penalty scored) Nachtweih; (penalty scored) Pezzey

21 October 1981 2nd Round	SKA Rostov (Soviet Union)	1–0	(West Germany) Eintracht Frankfurt	Rostov, Soviet Union
	Yashin 50'	Report		Stadium: SKA SKVO Stadium; Attendance: 38,000; Referee: Carpenter

4 November 1981 2nd Round	Eintracht Frankfurt (West Germany)	2–0	(Soviet Union) SKA Rostov	Frankfurt, West Germany
20:00 CET	Pezzey 3'; Lorant 59' (pen.)	Report	Andryushchenko (red card)	Stadium: Waldstadion; Attendance: 30,000; Referee: Hunting

3 March 1982 Quarter-finals	Tottenham Hotspur (England)	2–0	(West Germany) Eintracht Frankfurt	London, England
19:45 GMT	Miller 58'; Hazard 81'	Report		Stadium: White Hart Lane; Attendance: 44,000; Referee: Rainea

17 March 1982 Quarter-finals	Eintracht Frankfurt (West Germany)	2–1	(England) Tottenham Hotspur	Frankfurt, West Germany
20:00 CET	Borchers 2'; Cha Bum-kun 15'	Report	Hoddle 80'	Stadium: Waldstadion; Attendance: 41,000; Referee: Garrido

=== Indoor soccer tournaments ===
==== Kiel ====
27 December 1981 1st Match	Holstein Kiel	3–1	Eintracht Frankfurt	Kiel, West Germany
	Goal	Report	Neuberger	Stadium: Ostseehalle; Attendance: 4,533

27 December 1981 2nd Match	Eintracht Frankfurt	2–4	FC Twente	Kiel, West Germany
	Cha Bum-kun; Körbel	Report	Goal	Stadium: Ostseehalle; Attendance: 4,533

27 December 1981 3rd Match	Eintracht Braunschweig	3–6	Eintracht Frankfurt	Kiel, West Germany
	Goal	Report	Borchers; Lottermann; Cha Bum-kun; (o.g.)	Stadium: Ostseehalle; Attendance: 4,533

===== Table =====
Pos	Team	Pld	W	D	L	GF	GA	GD	Pts
1	Holstein Kiel	3	1	2	0	7	5	+2	4
2	Eintracht Braunschweig	3	1	1	1	7	9	−2	3
3	FC Twente	3	1	1	1	7	6	+1	3
4	Eintracht Frankfurt	3	1	0	2	9	10	−1	2

Source: eintracht-archiv.de
Rules for classification: 1) Points

==== Frankfurt ====
29 December 1981 1st Match	Eintracht Frankfurt	7–2	FSV Frankfurt	Frankfurt, West Germany
	Pezzey 8'; Cha Bum-kun 12', 13'; Löw 16', 20'; Lorant 25'; Nickel 27'	Report	Sarroca 7', 21'	Attendance: 5,000

29 December 1981 2nd Match	Eintracht Frankfurt	1–5	1. FC Kaiserslautern	Frankfurt, West Germany
	Nachtweih (red card) 85'; Cha Bum-kun 14'	Report	Neues; Brummer 13', 21'; Melzer 23'; Dusek 26'	Stadium: Festhalle; Attendance: 5,000

29 December 1981 3rd Match	Eintracht Frankfurt	4–5	Kickers Offenbach	Frankfurt, West Germany
	Cha Bum-kun 12' 14'; Borchers	Report	Martin; Krause 5'; Sandner	Stadium: Festhalle; Attendance: 5,000

30 December 1981 4th Match	Eintracht Frankfurt	4–2	FSV Frankfurt	Frankfurt, West Germany
	Cha Bum-kun 3'; Falkenmayer 6', 8'; Lorant 22' (pen.)	Report	Sarroca; Luy	Stadium: Festhalle; Attendance: 6,000

30 December 1981 5th Match	Eintracht Frankfurt	4–0	1. FC Kaiserslautern	Frankfurt, West Germany
	Cha Bum-kun 5' 18' 26'	Report		Stadium: Festhalle; Attendance: 6,000

30 December 1981 6th Match	Eintracht Frankfurt	5–2	Kickers Offenbach	Frankfurt, West Germany
	Nachtweih 7'; Körbel 13'; Falkenmayer 20'; Löw	Report	Bein 24', 28'	Stadium: Festhalle; Attendance: 6,000

===== Table =====
Pos	Team	Pld	W	D	L	GF	GA	GD	Pts
1	1. FC Kaiserslautern	6	5	0	1	16	12	+4	10
2	Eintracht Frankfurt	6	4	0	2	25	16	+9	8
3	Kickers Offenbach	6	2	0	4	22	29	−7	4
4	FSV Frankfurt	6	1	0	5	17	23	−6	2

Source: eintracht-archiv.de
Rules for classification: 1) Points

==== Berlin ====
5 January 1982 1st Match	Hertha BSC	2–2	Eintracht Frankfurt	Berlin, West Germany
	Dickert; Rasmussen	Report	Nachtweih; Körbel	Stadium: Deutschlandhalle

5 January 1982 2nd Match	FC Schalke 04	2–2	Eintracht Frankfurt	Berlin, West Germany
	Tüfekçi; Janzon	Report	Cha Bum-kun; Nickel	Stadium: Deutschlandhalle

6 January 1982 3rd Match	Eintracht Frankfurt	5–1	AZ '67	Berlin, West Germany
	Nachtweih; Cha Bum-kun; Pezzey; Körbel	Report	Spelbos	Stadium: Deutschlandhalle

6 January 1982 4th Match	Berlin XI	0–1	Eintracht Frankfurt	Berlin, West Germany
		Report	Cha Bum-kun	Stadium: Deutschlandhalle

7 January 1982 5th Match	Eintracht Frankfurt	2–1	Fenerbahçe	Berlin, West Germany
	Nachtweih; Körbel	Report	Mustafa	Stadium: Deutschlandhalle

7 January 1982 6th Match	Hertha BSC	1–2	Eintracht Frankfurt	Berlin, West Germany
	Mohr	Report	Cha Bum-kun; Nachtweih	Stadium: Deutschlandhalle

8 January 1982 7th Match	FC Schalke 04	2–4	Eintracht Frankfurt	Berlin, West Germany
	Kügler; Bittcher	Report	Pezzey; Cha Bum-kun; Nickel	Stadium: Deutschlandhalle

8 January 1982 8th Match	Eintracht Frankfurt	4–3	AZ '67	Berlin, West Germany
	Löw; Pezzey; Nickel; Nachtweih	Report	Jonker; Hovenkamp; Tol	Stadium: Deutschlandhalle

9 January 1982 9th Match	Berlin XI	2–1	Eintracht Frankfurt	Berlin, West Germany
	Schwager; Schamlz	Report	Löw	Stadium: Deutschlandhalle

9 January 1982 10th Match	Eintracht Frankfurt	5–0	Fenerbahçe	Berlin, West Germany
	Pezzey; Falkenmayer; Nickel	Report		Stadium: Deutschlandhalle

===== Table =====
Pos	Team	Pld	W	D	L	GF	GA	GD	Pts
1	Eintracht Frankfurt	10	7	2	1	28	14	+14	16
2	AZ '67	10	5	1	4	26	23	+3	11
3	Hertha BSC	10	4	2	4	20	20	0	10
4	FC Schalke 04	10	4	2	4	22	27	−5	10
5	Berlin XI	10	3	2	5	16	14	+2	8
6	Fenerbahçe	10	2	1	7	17	30	−13	5

Source: eintracht-archiv.de
Rules for classification: 1) Points

== Squad ==
=== Squad and statistics ===
No.	Pos	Nat	Player	Total		Bundesliga		DFB-Pokal		European Cup Winners' Cup	
No.	Pos	Nat	Player	Apps	Goals	Apps	Goals	Apps	Goals	Apps	Goals
	GK	(West Germany) FRG	Joachim Jüriens	5	0	4	0	0	0	1	0
	GK	(East Germany) GDR	Jürgen Pahl	39	0	32	0	2	0	5	0
	GK	(West Germany) FRG	Ralf Raps	1	0	1	0	0	0	0	0
	DF	(West Germany) FRG	Charly Körbel	41	6	34	5	2	0	5	1
	DF	(West Germany) FRG	Willi Neuberger	38	3	31	3	1	0	6	0
	DF	(Austria) AUT	Bruno Pezzey	38	7	30	4	2	1	6	2
	DF	(West Germany) FRG	Michael Sziedat	37	1	29	1	2	0	6	0
	DF	(West Germany) FRG	Wolfgang Trapp	13	0	8	0	2	0	3	0
	MF	(West Germany) FRG	Ralf Falkenmayer	40	3	32	3	2	0	6	0
	MF	(West Germany) FRG	Werner Lorant	36	9	29	7	2	1	5	1
	MF	(West Germany) FRG	Stefan Lottermann	33	6	27	5	1	1	5	0
	MF	(East Germany) GDR	Norbert Nachtweih	38	12	31	11	1	1	6	0
	MF	(West Germany) FRG	Bernd Nickel	34	8	28	7	2	1	4	0
	FW	(West Germany) FRG	Holger Anthes	17	4	15	4	1	0	1	0
	FW	(West Germany) FRG	Ronny Borchers	27	11	22	9	1	1	4	1
	FW	(South Korea) KOR	Cha Bum-kun	38	12	31	11	1	0	6	1
	FW	(West Germany) FRG	Bernd Eufinger	1	0	1	0	0	0	0	0
	FW	(West Germany) FRG	Armin Görtz	5	0	4	0	1	0	0	0
	FW	(West Germany) FRG	Helmut Gulich	1	0	0	0	0	0	1	0
	FW	(West Germany) FRG	Harald Karger	1	0	1	0	0	0	0	0
	FW	(West Germany) FRG	Michael Künast	0	0	0	0	0	0	0	0
	FW	(West Germany) FRG	Joachim Löw	29	5	24	5	2	0	3	0
	FW	(West Germany) FRG	Norbert Otto	6	0	3	0	1	0	2	0

=== Transfers ===
In:

No.	Pos.	Nation	Player
—	FW	FRG	Holger Anthes (from FSV Frankfurt)
—	FW	FRG	Bernd Eufinger (from RSV Würges)
—	FW	FRG	Armin Görtz (from SV Welver)
—	FW	FRG	Helmut Gulich (from Eintracht Frankfurt Amateure)
—	FW	FRG	Joachim Löw (from VfB Stuttgart)
—	FW	FRG	Norbert Otto (from Eintracht Frankfurt Amateure)
—	GK	FRG	Ralf Raps (from Eintracht Frankfurt Amateure)

Out:

No.	Pos.	Nation	Player
—	MF	FRG	Michael Blättel (to 1. FC Saarbrücken)
—	FW	FRG	Bernd Eufinger (to VfL Osnabrück)
—	GK	FRG	Klaus Funk (to Werder Bremen)
—	DF	FRG	Rigobert Gruber (to Werder Bremen)
—	FW	FRG	Norbert Hönnscheidt (to Wormatia Worms)
—	DF	FRG	Wolfgang Trapp (to Darmstadt 98)
—	DF	FRG	Claus-Peter Zick (to Eintracht Haiger)

== Sources ==
- Matheja, Ulrich (2011). Unsere Eintracht - Eintracht Frankfurt - Die Chronik. Die Werkstatt. ISBN 978-3-89533-750-5.
