= 1983 European Cup final =

- Match programme cover
- Event: 1982–83 European Cup
| Hamburger SV | Juventus |
| (West Germany) | (Italy) |
| 1 | 0 |
- Date: 25 May 1983
- Venue: Olympic Stadium, Athens
- Referee: Nicolae Rainea (Romania)
- Attendance: 73,500

The 1983 European Cup final was a football match held at the Olympic Stadium, Athens, on 25 May 1983, that saw Hamburger SV of West Germany defeat Juventus of Italy 1–0. A single goal from Felix Magath eight minutes into the game was enough for Hamburg to claim their first European Cup title. It was the sixth consecutive European Cup final to finish with a 1–0 scoreline.

== Route to the final ==
| (West Germany) Hamburger SV | | | | Round | (Italy) Juventus | | | |
|---|---|---|---|---|---|---|---|---|
| Opponent | Agg. | 1st leg | 2nd leg | | Opponent | Agg. | 1st leg | 2nd leg |
| (East Germany) Dynamo Berlin | 3–1 | 1–1 (A) | 2–0 (H) | First round | (Denmark) Hvidovre IF | 7–4 | 4–1 (A) | 3–3 (H) |
| (Greece) Olympiacos | 5–0 | 1–0 (H) | 4–0 (A) | Second round | (Belgium) Standard Liège | 3–1 | 1–1 (A) | 2–0 (H) |
| (Soviet Union) Dynamo Kyiv | 4–2 | 3–0 (A) | 1–2 (H) | Quarter-finals | (England) Aston Villa | 5–2 | 2–1 (A) | 3–1 (H) |
| (Spain) Real Sociedad | 3–2 | 1–1 (A) | 2–1 (H) | Semi-finals | (Poland) Widzew Łódź | 4–2 | 2–0 (H) | 2–2 (A) |

== Match ==
=== Details ===
25 May 1983
21:15 EEST

| (West Germany) Hamburger SV | 1–0 | (Italy) Juventus |
|---|---|---|
| Magath 9' | Report |

Olympic Stadium, Athens
Attendance: 73,500
Referee: Nicolae Rainea (Romania)

| Hamburger SV | Juventus |

| GK | 1 | (West Germany) Uli Stein |
| SW | 5 | (West Germany) Holger Hieronymus |
| RB | 2 | (West Germany) Manfred Kaltz |
| CB | 4 | (West Germany) Ditmar Jakobs |
| LB | 3 | (West Germany) Bernd Wehmeyer |
| CM | 6 | (West Germany) Wolfgang Rolff | (yellow card) 35' |
| LM | 7 | (West Germany) Jürgen Milewski |
| RM | 8 | (West Germany) Jürgen Groh | (yellow card) 39' |
| AM | 10 | (West Germany) Felix Magath |
| SS | 11 | (Denmark) Lars Bastrup | | (substituted off) 55' |
| CF | 9 | (West Germany) Horst Hrubesch (c) |
Substitutes:
| MF | 12 | (West Germany) Thomas von Heesen | | (substituted on) 55' |
Manager:
(Austria) Ernst Happel

| GK | 1 | (Italy) Dino Zoff (c) |
| SW | 6 | (Italy) Gaetano Scirea |
| RB | 2 | (Italy) Claudio Gentile |
| CB | 5 | (Italy) Sergio Brio |
| LB | 3 | (Italy) Antonio Cabrini | (yellow card) 39' |
| CM | 8 | (Italy) Marco Tardelli |
| CM | 4 | (Italy) Massimo Bonini | (yellow card) 36' |
| AM | 10 | (France) Michel Platini |
| RW | 7 | (Italy) Roberto Bettega |
| SS | 11 | (Poland) Zbigniew Boniek |
| CF | 9 | (Italy) Paolo Rossi | | (substituted off) 56' |
Substitutes:
| MF | 15 | (Italy) Domenico Marocchino | | (substituted on) 56' |
Manager:
(Italy) Giovanni Trapattoni

== See also ==
- 1982–83 Hamburger SV season
- 1982–83 Juventus FC season
- 1983 European Cup Winners' Cup final
- 1983 European Super Cup
- 1983 UEFA Cup final
- Blocco-Juve
- Juventus FC in international football
