= Joachim Müller =

Joachim Müller may refer to:

- Joachim Daniel Andreas Müller (1812–1857), a Swedish gardener and writer
- Joachim Müller (politician), member of the 10th Bundestag
- Joachim Müller (footballer, born 1952)
- Joachim Müller (footballer, born 1961)
