= Aleksandr Andryushchenko =

Russian football coach and a player (born 1954)

Personal information
- Full name: Aleksandr Nikolayevich Andryushchenko
- Date of birth: November 2, 1954 (age 71)
- Height: 1.82 m (5 ft 11 1/2 in)
- Positions: Defender; midfielder

Team information
- Current team: FC Rostov (sports dept manager)

Senior career*
Years	Team	Apps	(Gls)
1972	FC Khimik Sieverodonetsk		
1973–1974	FC Karpaty Lviv	24	(1)
1975	PFC CSKA Moscow	30	(0)
1976–1986	FC SKA Rostov-on-Don	132	(2)

Managerial career
- 1988–1989: FC SKA Rostov-on-Don (assistant)
- 1991: FC SKA Rostov-on-Don (director)
- 1995–2000: FC Rostselmash Rostov-on-Don (assistant)
- 2001: FC Rostselmash Rostov-on-Don (administrator)
- 2005: FC Rostov (director of sports)
- 2008–: FC Rostov (sports dept mgr)
- * Club domestic league appearances and goals

Aleksandr Nikolayevich Andryushchenko (Russian: Александр Николаевич Андрющенко; born November 2, 1954) is a former Russian professional football player. He won the Soviet Cup in 1981.
