= Dieter Kramer =

German footballer

Personal information
- Date of birth: 12 April 1959 (age 67)
- Place of birth: Germany
- Height: 1.80 m (5 ft 11 in)
- Positions: Midfielder; striker

Senior career*
Years	Team	Apps	(Gls)
–1980	Fortuna Düsseldorf II		
1980–1981	SC Preußen Münster	30	(4)
1981–1982	Hamburger SV	1	(0)
1982–1984	VfL Bochum	6	(0)
1984–1988	VfL Bochum II		
- * Club domestic league appearances and goals

Dieter Kramer (born 12 April 1959) is a retired German football player. He spent three seasons in the Bundesliga with Hamburger SV and VfL Bochum.

== Honours ==
- UEFA Cup finalist: 1981–82
- Bundesliga champion: 1981–82
