= Felix Magath =

German football player and manager (born 1953)

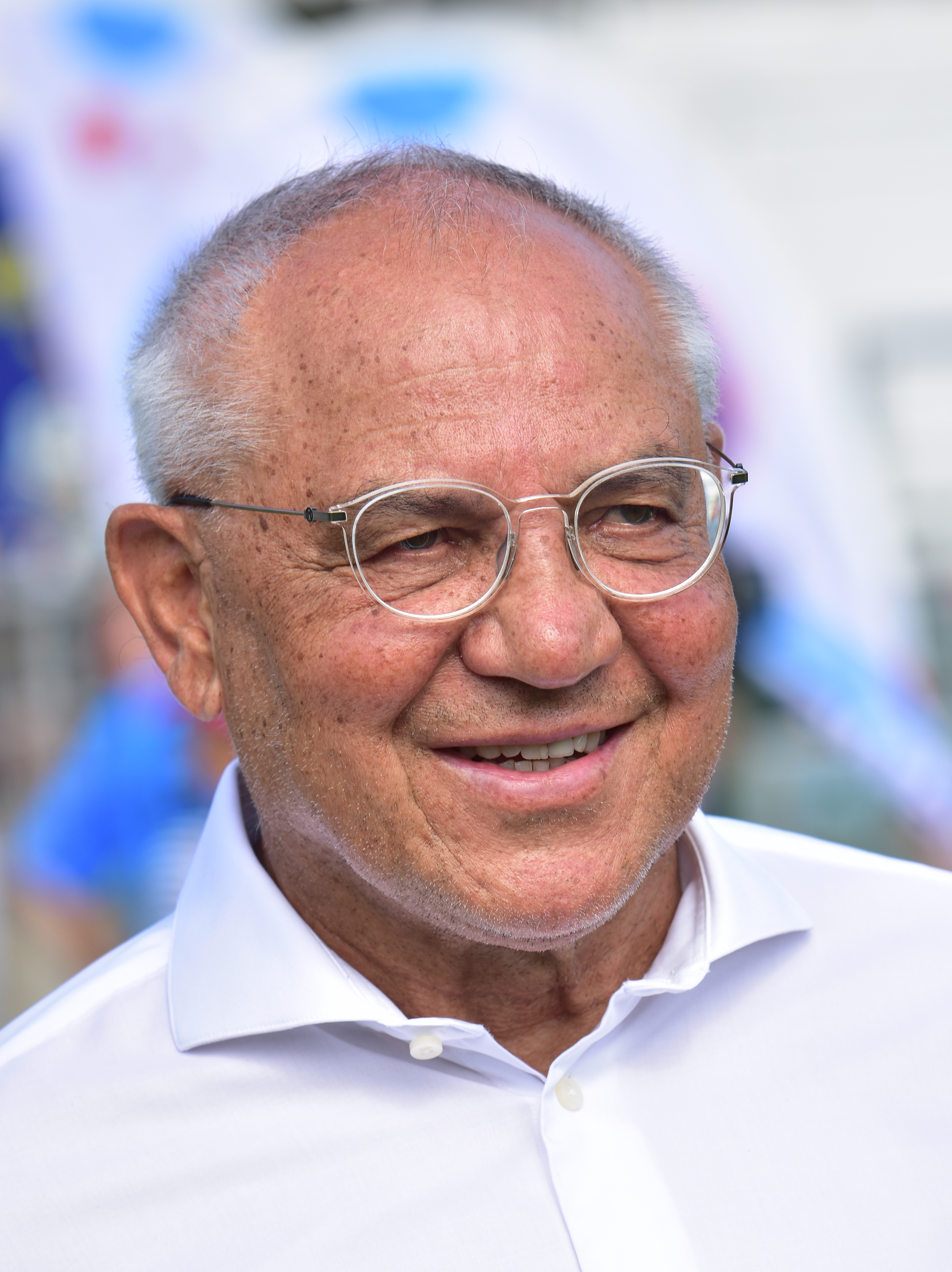
- Magath in 2024

Personal information
- Full name: Wolfgang Felix Magath
- Date of birth: 26 July 1953 (age 73)
- Place of birth: Aschaffenburg, West Germany
- Height: 1.72 m (5 ft 8 in)
- Position: Midfielder

Youth career
- 1960–1964: VfR Nilkheim
- 1964–1972: TV 60 Aschaffenburg

Senior career*
Years	Team	Apps	(Gls)
1972–1974	Viktoria Aschaffenburg		
1974–1976	1. FC Saarbrücken	76	(29)
1976–1986	Hamburger SV	306	(46)
Total		382	(75)

International career
1977–1986	West Germany	43	(3)

Managerial career
- 1995–1997: Hamburger SV
- 1997–1998: 1. FC Nürnberg
- 1998–1999: Werder Bremen
- 1999–2001: Eintracht Frankfurt
- 2001–2004: VfB Stuttgart
- 2004–2007: Bayern Munich
- 2007–2009: VfL Wolfsburg
- 2009–2011: Schalke 04
- 2011–2012: VfL Wolfsburg
- 2014: Fulham
- 2016–2017: Shandong Luneng Taishan
- 2022: Hertha BSC
Medal record
Men's football
Representing West Germany
UEFA European Championship
Winner	1980 Italy
FIFA World Cup
Runner-up	1982 Spain
Runner-up	1986 México
- * Club domestic league appearances and goals

Wolfgang Felix Magath (German pronunciation: [maɡat]; born 26 July 1953) is a German football manager and former player.

The most notable spell of his playing career was with Hamburger SV, with whom he won three Bundesliga titles, the 1977 European Cup Winners' Cup Final and the 1983 European Cup Final, scoring in both finals. He also gained 43 international caps for the West Germany national team, winning UEFA Euro 1980 and reaching two consecutive World Cup finals.

As a manager, Magath's honours include two consecutive Doubles (Bundesliga and German Cup titles) with Bayern Munich, and a further Bundesliga title with VfL Wolfsburg in 2009.

In 2014, Magath coached English club Fulham, becoming the first German to manage in the Premier League.

== Playing career ==
Born near Aschaffenburg, Magath started his career playing for local club Viktoria Aschaffenburg. From 1974 to 1976, he played for 1. FC Saarbrücken, at that time in the second division, before moving to Hamburger SV in the top flight. He spent the following ten seasons with Hamburg, and from his debut in 1976 to his retirement he scored 46 goals in 306 games in the West German top flight.

In 1983, Magath led Hamburg to success in the European Cup, scoring the single goal in the final against Juventus; in 1980–81, he netted a career-best (in the first division) ten goals, helping his side to a runner-up league spot, as Hamburg also won the league in three years during that time.

Magath also represented the West Germany national team at many international events, including the 1982 and 1986 FIFA World Cups, helping West Germany finish in second place both times. He was also part of the squad that won the 1980 UEFA European Championship. Magath made his debut on 30 April 1977, in a 2–1 friendly win with Yugoslavia, and went on to amass 43 caps, with three goals.

== Style of play ==
A diminutive playmaker, with an eye for goal, Magath normally played either as an attacking or central midfielder, and who possessed technical skills, vision, and stamina, despite his lack of pace and his stocky physique. He was also a good passer and striker of the ball with his left foot, and was known for his work-rate on the pitch, as well as his ability to interpret the game.

== Managerial career ==
=== 1986–1992: General manager ===
Having suffered a career-ending knee injury, Magath retired shortly after the 1986 World Cup and became general manager for his former club Hamburg. He left Hamburg in June 1988 after moderate success. His next stints as general manager included then 2. Bundesliga, side 1. FC Saarbrücken (November 1989 to June 1990), as well as Bayer Uerdingen (July 1990 to January 1992), who were relegated from the first tier during Magath's time at the club.

=== 1992–2001: Early coaching career ===
Magath took up coaching in 1992 as a player-coach for the fourth-tier club FC Bremerhaven, which he led to division championship. He then rejoined Hamburger SV as reserves coach in 1993, and became manager Benno Möhlmann's assistant soon after. Magath succeeded Möhlmann as manager after the latter was sacked in October 1995. His first match was a 2–2 draw against 1860 Munich. Having reached the UEFA Cup during his first season, Hamburg finished in fifth place. The following season as disappointing 15th at the time Magath was sacked. His final match was a 4–0 loss to 1. FC Köln. He finished with a record of 28 wins, 19 draws, and 22 losses.

In the following years, Magath acquired a reputation as the fireman, coming in at difficult times at a club and leading it to salvation. In September 1997, he took over 1. FC Nürnberg who were newly promoted to the 2. Bundesliga and fighting relegation. His first match was a 0–0 draw against KFC Uerdingen 05. Der Club finished the season in third–place, meaning promotion to the Bundesliga, but Magath left due to differences in opinion with the club president Michael A. Roth. He finished with a record of 16 wins, eight draws, and five losses. During a short stint at Werder Bremen during the 1998–99 season, Magath lead the club out of relegation places, only for Bremen to find themselves in the relegation dogfight again with two games to go. At this point he was replaced as manager by Thomas Schaaf who helped them avoid relegation by a point. Magath also helped Bremen get to the final of the DFB-Pokal however he was sacked before the final itself, which Bremen won in his absence. He had nine wins, seven draws, and ten losses. Halfway through the 1999–00 season, Magath joined troubled Eintracht Frankfurt. An impressive Magath-inspired run saw Frankfurt finish the second round as third best and four points off relegation. Magath was sacked the season after (29 January 2001) when Frankfurt found themselves in the relegation zone. His last match was a 5–1 loss to Köln. He finished with record of 15 wins, five draws, and 17 losses.

=== 2001–2007: Head coach at Stuttgart and Bayern ===
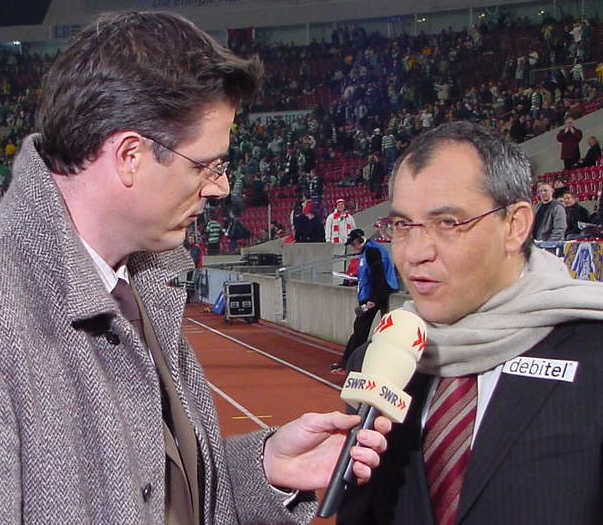
Magath being interviewed as the coach of VfB Stuttgart

Magath bounced back with what was to become one of his most successful stints when he took over fellow relegation battlers VfB Stuttgart a few weeks after. Having narrowly avoided relegation in 2001, Stuttgart finished the 2001–02 in a mid-table position. The club went then on to become 2002–03 Bundesliga runners-up and finished the 2003–04 season as respectable fourth. During this time, Magath also introduced a group of players from the Stuttgart youth ranks, such as Timo Hildebrand, Andreas Hinkel and Kevin Kurányi, who became known as "die jungen Wilden" (wild youth). The Stuttgart stint was also the first time Magath combined the head coach and the director of football roles. He finished with a record of 73 wins, 37 draws, and 37 losses.

Having impressed with Stuttgart, Magath was handed the FC Bayern Munich job on 1 July 2004. In his first season, Magath was able to lead his team to victory in both the league and cup, completing the double, a feat which would be repeated in 2005–06, the first time ever in the competition's history.

However, after a slow start to the 2006–07 season, with the team mired in fourth place which would not qualify them for the Champions League, Magath was sacked on 31 January 2007. He finished with a record of 84 wins, 25 draws, and 22 losses.

=== 2007–2012: Head coach and director of football of VfL Wolfsburg and Schalke 04 ===
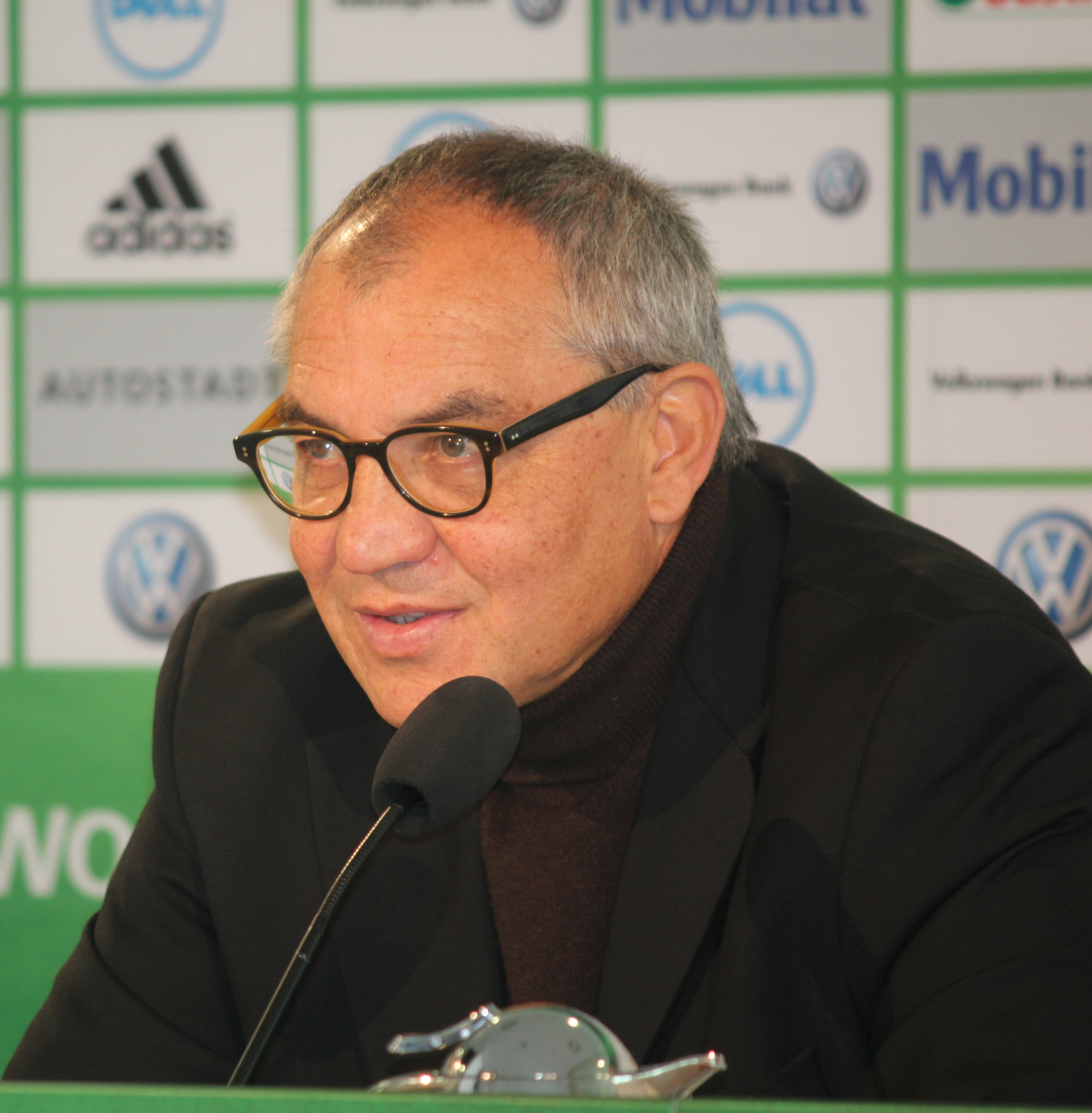
Magath at a press conference of VfL Wolfsburg in 2011

In June 2007, Magath signed a contract with VfL Wolfsburg, as head coach and director of football. Magath lead the Wolves to play in the 2008–09 UEFA Cup and the following season's Champions League, the latter as league champions for the first time. He finished with a record of 46 wins, 18 draws, and 21 losses.

Before the season 2008–09 had ended, Magath agreed on a four-year contract with Schalke 04, again as both head coach and director of football, starting on 1 July 2009. Schalke finished Magath's first season in charge as runners-up, but after a series of disappointing domestic performances and growing player discontent, Magath was sacked by Schalke in March 2011. the following day, Magath claimed that he had not been informed of his dismissal. He finished with a record of 42 wins, 16 draws, and 21 losses.

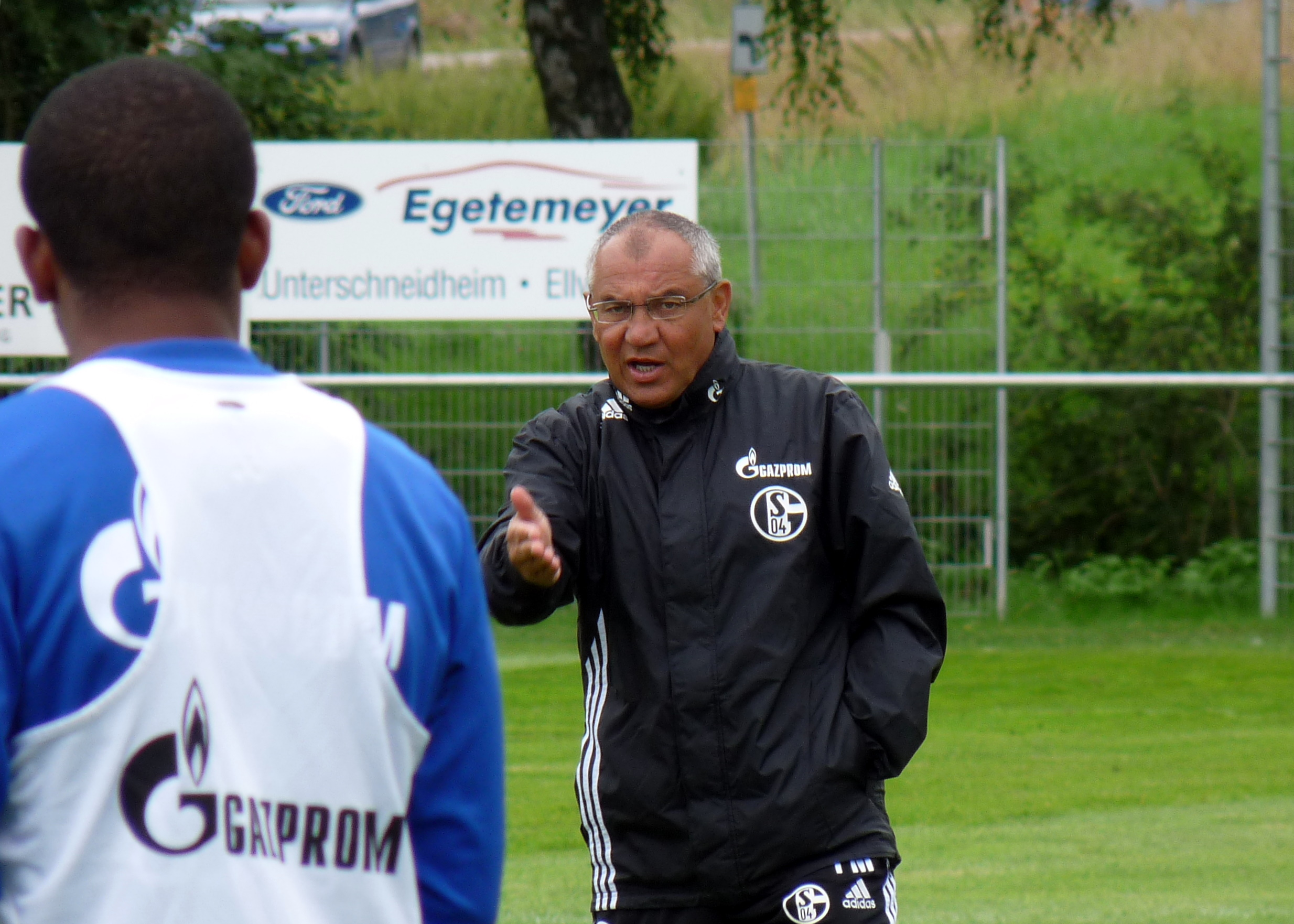
Magath coaching Schalke 04

Only 48 hours later, on 18 March, Magath once again signed with now relegation-battling VfL Wolfsburg, the side he had previously led to the league title in 2009. Magath steered the club to safety, avoiding the relegation play–off by two points, but though the club invested heavily, Magath could only achieve a mid-table finish in the following 2011–12 season. After only five points in eight matches (and no goals and points in the last four games) in the 2012–13 season, Magath left the club by mutual consent on 25 October 2012. He finished with a record of 18 wins, 10 draws, and 24 losses.

=== 2014–2017: Return to management with Fulham and Shandong Luneng Taishan ===
On 14 February 2014, Fulham released a statement that Magath would be their new first team manager effective immediately on an eighteen-month contract. Magath brought in Tomas Oral as first team coach and Werner Leuthard as the person in charge of conditioning while the club dismissed manager Rene Meulensteen, assistant coach Ray Wilkins, technical director Alan Curbishley, and first team coaches Mick Priest and Jonathan Hill. The role was Magath's first in two years and at the time his only venture outside of his native Germany. Magath believed that he could save Fulham from relegation and that 12 matches was enough to save the club. Fulham played their first match under Magath on 22 February 2014. The match ended in a 1–1 draw with Ashkan Dejagah, Magath's former player at VfL Wolfsburg, being the first Fulham goalscorer of Magath's tenure.

On 15 March, Fulham won their first match with Magath in charge against Newcastle United, with Dejagah being the lone scorer. Magath picked up four points from his first six matches and answered questions about a potential resignation. On 3 May 2014, Fulham were relegated from the Premier League after a 4–1 loss to Stoke City. Magath believed that Fulham could earn immediate promotion. He started the 2014–15 season with four consecutive losses to Ipswich Town, Millwall, Wolverhampton Wanderers and Derby County. On 18 September 2014 Magath was sacked as Fulham manager after a run of eleven league games without a win. He finished with a record of four wins, four draws, and 12 losses.

After Gerald Baumgartner was sacked by Austria Wien, Magath eventually became the "preferred" choice. Spartak Moscow also offered Magath a contract. Thorsten Fink and Dmitriy Alenichev took the coaching jobs. He eventually took the job at Shandong Luneng Taishan, replacing former Brazil national football team manager Mano Menezes. He took the job on 8 June 2016. He made his debut on 12 June 2016 in a 2–1 loss against Hebei China Fortune. His first win was a 2–1 win against Jiangsu Suning on 9 July 2016. Four days later, he got his second win against Shijiazhuang Ever Bright, a 4–0 win.

He led Shandong throughout the 2017 Chinese Super League, finishing 6th, but left the club shortly after the end of the season.

=== 2020–present: Flyeralarm Global Soccer ===
In January 2020, Magath revealed that his time as a coach was over and that he wanted to "help football in a different way". In step with this, he introduced himself as the new boss of FLYERALARM Global Soccer. Magath became responsible for FLYERALARM's commitment to the clubs Würzburger Kickers in Germany and Flyeralarm Admira, formerly known as FC Admira Wacker Mödling.

=== 2022: Hertha BSC ===
On 13 March 2022, Magath became Hertha BSC's third head coach of the 2021–22 season after he replaced Tayfun Korkut, who had replaced Pál Dárdai in November 2021. On 17 March 2022, Magath tested positive for COVID-19 and had to postpone his debut match.

== Reputation as a manager ==
As a manager, Magath quickly gained respect and became known for his hard, grinding training methods, laying heavy emphasis on discipline, fitness and conditioning. Players gave him nicknames like "Saddam" (Saddam Hussein) or "Quälix", a portmanteau of his first name Felix and the German verb "quälen" (to torture). His methods have also been considered to be controversial in the media, however. He was once described by former Eintracht Frankfurt player Bachirou Salou as the "last dictator in Europe".

After leaving Fulham in September 2014, bizarre stories emerged about how Magath had suggested that Brede Hangeland rub cheese on a thigh injury. Magath stated that Hangeland did not have a thigh injury but an inflammation of the knee, and that he suggested the additional use of an alternative treatment with a bandage (dressing) consisting of Quark. Fulham player Sascha Riether later said that the story was greatly exaggerated and that Magath had suggested he use a traditional topfen curd.

== Personal life ==
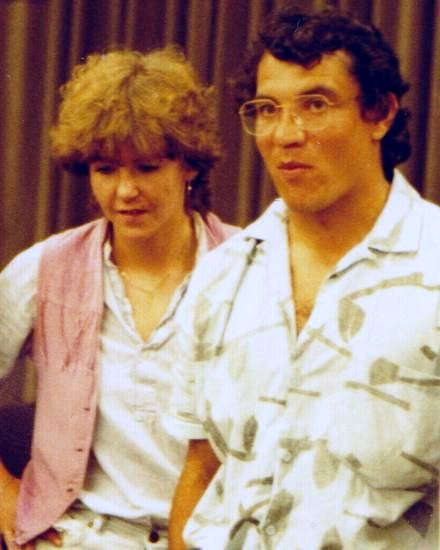
Magath in 1985

Magath is the son of a Puerto Rican former soldier in the United States Army stationed in Aschaffenburg and a German mother. In 1954, Magath's father abandoned Magath and his mother to return to his homeland. The adolescent Magath first heard from his father when he was 15 years old, after he wrote a letter to Puerto Rico.

Magath is also a chess enthusiast, an interest which he developed during the 1978 World Chess Championship while he was bedridden due to hepatitis. In 1985, he played in a simultaneous exhibition against Garry Kasparov.

== Career statistics ==
=== Club ===
Appearances and goals by club, season and competition
Club	Season	League			DFB-Pokal		Europe (Note: Includes European Cup, UEFA Cup Winners' Cup, and UEFA Cup)		Other (Note: Includes UEFA Super Cup and Intercontinental Cup)		Total	
Club	Season	Division	Apps	Goals	Apps	Goals	Apps	Goals	Apps	Goals	Apps	Goals
1. FC Saarbrücken	1974–75	2. Bundesliga Süd	38	12	1	0	—		—		39	12
1. FC Saarbrücken	1975–76	2. Bundesliga Süd	38	17	1	0	—		—		39	17
1. FC Saarbrücken	Total		76	29	2	0	—		—		78	29
Hamburger SV	1976–77	Bundesliga	30	1	1	0	6	4	—		37	5
Hamburger SV	1977–78	Bundesliga	33	4	4	2	3	1	2	0	42	7
Hamburger SV	1978–79	Bundesliga	21	4	1	0	—		—		22	4
Hamburger SV	1979–80	Bundesliga	32	5	2	1	7	0	—		40	6
Hamburger SV	1980–81	Bundesliga	33	10	4	3	5	0	—		42	13
Hamburger SV	1981–82	Bundesliga	28	8	4	1	9	1	—		41	10
Hamburger SV	1982–83	Bundesliga	34	4	4	0	9	2	—		47	6
Hamburger SV	1983–84	Bundesliga	34	5	4	1	2	0	3	0	43	6
Hamburger SV	1984–85	Bundesliga	32	3	1	0	6	1	—		39	4
Hamburger SV	1985–86	Bundesliga	29	2	1	0	1	0	—		31	2
Hamburger SV	Total		306	46	26	8	48	9	5	0	385	63
Career total			382	75	28	8	48	9	5	0	463	92

=== Managerial ===
As of matches played on 23 May 2022

Team	From	To	Record								
Team	From	To	M	W	D	L	GF	GA	GD	Win %	Ref.
Hamburg II	1 July 1993	5 October 1995	73	25	18	30	108	129	−21	34.25	
Hamburger SV	5 October 1995	18 May 1997	69	28	19	22	102	102	+0	40.58	
1. FC Nürnberg	1 September 1997	30 June 1998	29	16	8	5	43	21	+22	55.17	
Werder Bremen	22 October 1998	10 May 1999	26	9	7	10	30	34	−4	34.62	
Eintracht Frankfurt	27 December 1999	29 January 2001	37	15	5	17	49	59	−10	40.54	
VfB Stuttgart	23 February 2001	30 June 2004	147	73	37	37	220	151	+69	49.66	
Bayern Munich	1 July 2004	31 January 2007	131	84	25	22	264	128	+136	64.12	
VfL Wolfsburg	31 May 2007	30 June 2009	85	46	18	21	179	110	+69	54.12	
FC Schalke 04	1 July 2009	16 March 2011	79	42	16	21	117	76	+41	53.16	
Wolfsburg	18 March 2011	25 October 2012	52	18	10	24	69	87	−18	34.62	
Fulham	14 February 2014	18 September 2014	20	4	4	12	21	45	−24	20.00	
Shandong Luneng	8 June 2016	1 December 2017	51	20	15	16	76	31	+45	39.22	
Hertha BSC	13 March 2022	2 June 2022	9	3	1	5	10	12	−2	33.33	
Total			808	383	183	242	1,290	1,019	+271	47.40	—

== Honours ==
=== Player ===
Hamburger SV

- Bundesliga: 1978–79, 1981–82, 1982–83
- European Cup: 1982–83
- European Cup Winners' Cup: 1976–77

West Germany

- UEFA European Championship: 1980
- FIFA World Cup runner-up: 1982, 1986

Individual

- kicker Bundesliga Team of the Season: 1981–82, 1982–83
- 1983 Ballon d'Or: 5th place

=== Manager ===
VfB Stuttgart

- UEFA Intertoto Cup: 2002

Bayern Munich

- Bundesliga: 2004–05, 2005–06
- DFB-Pokal: 2004–05, 2005–06
- DFB-Ligapokal: 2004

VfL Wolfsburg

- Bundesliga: 2008–09

Individual

- German Football Manager of the Year: 2003, 2005, 2009

== See also ==
- List of Puerto Ricans
