= 1981–82 Bundesliga =

19th season of the Bundesliga

Bundesliga
- Season: 1981–82
- Dates: 8 August 1981 – 29 May 1982
- Champions: Hamburger SV; 2nd Bundesliga title 5th German title
- Relegated: SV Darmstadt 98; MSV Duisburg
- European Cup: Hamburger SV
- Cup Winners' Cup: FC Bayern Munich
- UEFA Cup: 1. FC Köln; 1. FC Kaiserslautern; SV Werder Bremen; Borussia Dortmund
- Goals: 1,067
- Average goals/game: 3.49
- Top goalscorer: Horst Hrubesch (27)
- Biggest home win: Frankfurt 9–2 Bremen (14 November 1981); Hamburg 7–0 Duisburg (26 September 1981); FC Bayern 7–0 Düsseldorf (6 February 1982)
- Biggest away win: Darmstadt 2–6 Karlsruhe (19 September 1981)
- Highest scoring: Frankfurt 9–2 Bremen (11 goals) (14 November 1981)

The 1981–82 Bundesliga was the 19th season of the Bundesliga, West Germany's premier football league. It began on 8 August 1981 and ended on 29 May 1982. Bayern Munich were the defending champions.

== Competition modus ==
Every team played two games against each other team, one at home and one away. Teams received two points for a win and one point for a draw. If two or more teams were tied on points, places were determined by goal difference and, if still tied, by goals scored. The team with the most points were crowned champions while the two teams with the fewest points were relegated to 2. Bundesliga. The third-to-last team had to compete in a two-legged relegation/promotion play-off against the third-placed team from 2. Bundesliga.

== Team changes to 1980–81 ==
TSV 1860 Munich, FC Schalke 04 and Bayer 05 Uerdingen were relegated to the 2. Bundesliga after finishing in the last three places. They were replaced by SV Werder Bremen, winners of the 2. Bundesliga Northern Division, SV Darmstadt 98, winners of the Southern Division and Eintracht Braunschweig, who won a two-legged promotion play-off against Kickers Offenbach.

== Team overview ==
Location of teams in Bundesliga 1981–82

Club	Location	Ground	Capacity
Arminia Bielefeld	Bielefeld	Stadion Alm	35,000
VfL Bochum	Bochum	Ruhrstadion	40,000
Eintracht Braunschweig	Braunschweig	Eintracht-Stadion	38,000
SV Werder Bremen	Bremen	Weserstadion	32,000
SV Darmstadt 98	Darmstadt	Stadion am Böllenfalltor	30,000
Borussia Dortmund	Dortmund	Westfalenstadion	54,000
MSV Duisburg	Duisburg	Wedaustadion	38,500
Fortuna Düsseldorf	Düsseldorf	Rheinstadion	59,600
Eintracht Frankfurt	Frankfurt	Waldstadion	62,000
Hamburger SV	Hamburg	Volksparkstadion	80,000
1. FC Kaiserslautern	Kaiserslautern	Stadion Betzenberg	42,000
Karlsruher SC	Karlsruhe	Wildparkstadion	50,000
1. FC Köln	Cologne	Müngersdorfer Stadion	61,000
Bayer 04 Leverkusen	Leverkusen	Ulrich-Haberland-Stadion	20,000
Borussia Mönchengladbach	Mönchengladbach	Bökelbergstadion	34,500
FC Bayern Munich	Munich	Olympiastadion	80,000
1. FC Nürnberg	Nuremberg	Städtisches Stadion	64,238
VfB Stuttgart	Stuttgart	Neckarstadion	72,000

== League table ==
Pos	Team	Pld	W	D	L	GF	GA	GD	Pts	Qualification or relegation
1	Hamburger SV (C)	34	18	12	4	95	45	+50	48	Qualification to European Cup first round
2	1. FC Köln	34	18	9	7	72	38	+34	45	Qualification to UEFA Cup first round (Note: As Bayern Munich qualified for the Cup Winners' Cup, their UEFA Cup spot was transferred to Borussia Dortmund.)
3	Bayern Munich	34	20	3	11	77	56	+21	43	Qualification to Cup Winners' Cup first round
4	1. FC Kaiserslautern	34	16	10	8	70	61	+9	42	Qualification to UEFA Cup first round
5	Werder Bremen	34	17	8	9	61	52	+9	42	Qualification to UEFA Cup first round
6	Borussia Dortmund	34	18	5	11	59	40	+19	41	Qualification to UEFA Cup first round
7	Borussia Mönchengladbach	34	15	10	9	61	51	+10	40	
8	Eintracht Frankfurt	34	17	3	14	83	72	+11	37	
9	VfB Stuttgart	34	13	9	12	62	55	+7	35	
10	VfL Bochum	34	12	8	14	52	51	+1	32	
11	Eintracht Braunschweig	34	14	4	16	61	66	−5	32	
12	Arminia Bielefeld	34	12	6	16	46	50	−4	30	
13	1. FC Nürnberg	34	11	6	17	53	72	−19	28	
14	Karlsruher SC	34	9	9	16	50	68	−18	27	
15	Fortuna Düsseldorf	34	6	13	15	48	73	−25	25	
16	Bayer Leverkusen (O)	34	9	7	18	45	72	−27	25	Qualification for relegation play-offs
17	Darmstadt 98 (R)	34	5	11	18	46	82	−36	21	Relegation to 2. Bundesliga
18	MSV Duisburg (R)	34	8	3	23	40	77	−37	19	Relegation to 2. Bundesliga

Source: www.dfb.de
Rules for classification: 1) points; 2) goal difference; 3) number of goals scored.
(C) Champions; (O) Play-off winners; (R) Relegated

== Results ==
Home \ Away	DSC	BOC	EBS	SVW	D98	BVB	DUI	F95	SGE	HSV	FCK	KSC	KOE	B04	BMG	FCB	FCN	VFB
Arminia Bielefeld	—	2–0	2–1	0–2	1–1	1–1	2–0	1–1	3–0	1–1	2–0	3–0	0–2	1–3	5–0	1–2	2–0	1–0
VfL Bochum	1–1	—	2–0	0–2	1–0	0–0	2–2	3–0	3–2	2–1	1–2	3–1	3–1	3–1	1–1	3–1	2–0	3–3
Eintracht Braunschweig	3–1	2–1	—	1–1	3–0	0–1	2–1	4–2	4–1	2–1	2–1	0–0	4–4	5–1	0–1	3–1	4–2	2–0
Werder Bremen	1–0	3–1	2–0	—	4–4	2–0	5–1	4–1	2–1	3–2	0–1	2–1	1–1	0–0	0–1	2–0	3–1	2–2
Darmstadt 98	1–0	2–0	2–3	1–1	—	1–3	3–2	2–2	1–4	2–2	0–0	2–6	2–4	1–3	1–1	1–2	2–1	3–3
Borussia Dortmund	3–0	3–2	1–2	1–0	4–0	—	2–1	4–2	0–2	2–3	2–2	4–0	1–0	2–0	2–3	2–0	3–1	2–3
MSV Duisburg	1–3	1–0	5–2	0–1	0–2	1–2	—	2–1	4–2	1–2	3–1	1–1	1–0	2–1	0–1	2–3	3–2	1–2
Fortuna Düsseldorf	4–1	2–1	1–1	0–0	2–2	0–0	2–0	—	2–2	3–3	4–2	2–0	1–1	5–1	0–2	1–2	1–1	2–3
Eintracht Frankfurt	2–1	0–1	4–2	9–2	2–1	1–4	4–1	4–0	—	3–2	2–2	4–1	4–2	3–2	3–0	4–3	3–1	4–1
Hamburger SV	3–1	2–2	4–2	5–0	6–1	2–2	7–0	6–1	2–0	—	4–0	3–3	3–1	0–0	1–1	4–1	6–1	1–1
1. FC Kaiserslautern	4–0	3–3	5–3	1–1	3–1	2–1	3–0	1–1	6–2	1–1	—	2–1	1–1	5–2	3–2	2–1	2–1	3–2
Karlsruher SC	2–1	2–2	2–1	3–0	3–1	0–2	2–0	1–0	2–2	2–2	1–1	—	1–4	1–2	1–1	4–1	3–2	0–2
1. FC Köln	0–1	1–0	3–0	4–2	1–1	1–0	3–0	3–0	2–0	1–1	3–4	2–0	—	5–2	3–0	4–0	4–1	3–0
Bayer Leverkusen	2–2	0–3	1–0	1–3	3–2	2–1	2–1	1–1	1–2	0–3	0–1	2–1	1–1	—	0–0	0–2	4–0	0–0
Borussia Mönchengladbach	3–1	4–2	4–2	2–4	6–1	0–1	4–2	3–0	1–0	1–3	2–2	2–2	0–2	3–1	—	3–0	4–2	0–0
Bayern Munich	3–2	1–0	3–1	3–1	4–1	3–1	4–0	7–0	3–2	3–4	4–2	4–1	1–1	6–2	1–1	—	1–1	1–0
1. FC Nürnberg	1–0	2–1	4–0	2–1	1–1	3–0	0–0	2–2	5–3	0–3	4–2	3–1	1–3	3–2	3–2	0–3	—	0–0
VfB Stuttgart	2–3	3–0	2–0	2–4	1–0	0–2	4–1	3–2	5–2	1–2	4–0	5–1	1–1	4–2	2–2	0–3	1–2	—

Source: DFB
Legend: Blue = home team win; Yellow = draw; Red = away team win.

== Relegation play-offs ==
Bayer Leverkusen and third-placed 2. Bundesliga team Kickers Offenbach had to compete in a two-legged relegation/promotion play-off. Leverkusen won 3–1 on aggregate and thus remained in the Bundesliga.

4 June 1982

Kickers Offenbach	0–1	Bayer Leverkusen
	Report link (in German)	Herzog 55'

Bieberer Berg, Offenbach am Main
Attendance: 18,000
Referee: Werner Föckler (Bad Dürkheim)

9 June 1982

Bayer Leverkusen	2–1	Kickers Offenbach
Szech 27', 59'	Report link (in German)	Walz 3'

Ulrich-Haberland-Stadion, Leverkusen
Attendance: 20,000
Referee: Jan Redelfs (Hannover)

== Top goalscorers ==
27 goals

- (Germany) Horst Hrubesch (Hamburger SV)

22 goals

- (Germany) Manfred Burgsmüller (Borussia Dortmund)

21 goals

- (Germany) Dieter Hoeneß (FC Bayern Munich)

18 goals

- (Germany) Paul Breitner (FC Bayern Munich)
- (Germany) Uwe Reinders (SV Werder Bremen)

17 goals

- (Germany) Ronnie Worm (Eintracht Braunschweig)

16 goals

- (Germany) Peter Cestonaro (SV Darmstadt 98)

15 goals

- (Germany) Pierre Littbarski (1. FC Köln)
- (Germany) Norbert Meier (SV Werder Bremen)
- (Germany) Kurt Pinkall (Borussia Mönchengladbach)
- (England) Tony Woodcock (1. FC Köln)

== Champion squad ==
Hamburger SV
Goalkeeper: Uli Stein (34).

Defenders: Ditmar Jakobs (33 / 4); Manfred Kaltz (32 / 9); Jürgen Groh (32); Holger Hieronymus (28 / 1); Franz Beckenbauer (10); Peter Hidien (2).
Midfielders: Bernd Wehmeyer (34 / 1); Jimmy Hartwig (31 / 14); Felix Magath (28 / 8); Caspar Memering (23 / 1); Michael Schröder (1).
Forwards: Lars Bastrup (Denmark) (34 / 13); Horst Hrubesch (captain; 32 / 27); Jürgen Milewski (23 / 10); Thomas von Heesen (20 / 7); Boriša Đorđević (Socialist Federal Republic of Yugoslavia) (7); Werner Dreßel (1); Dieter Kramer (1).
(league appearances and goals listed in brackets)

Manager: Ernst Happel (Austria) .

On the roster but did not appear in a league match: Heinz-Josef Koitka; Bernhard Scharold; Ralf Brunnecker.

== Attendances ==
No.	Team	Attendance	Change	Highest
1	Hamburger SV	34,700	5.7%	61,500
2	Bayern München	33,372	-8.3%	78,000
3	Borussia Dortmund	28,706	-16.5%	54,000
4	VfB Stuttgart	26,165	-17.6%	69,000
5	1. FC Köln	25,147	27.2%	60,000
6	Werder Bremen	24,235	132.4%	40,000
7	1. FC Nürnberg	23,118	-25.2%	60,000
8	Karlsruher SC	23,029	-16.2%	47,000
9	1. FC Kaiserslautern	21,333	-9.8%	34,154
10	Eintracht Frankfurt	21,147	-1.4%	60,000
11	Arminia Bielefeld	21,135	-8.0%	33,800
12	Borussia Mönchengladbach	20,582	11.8%	35,484
13	Eintracht Braunschweig	20,552	106.9%	33,000
14	VfL Bochum	17,824	-19.2%	35,000
15	Fortuna 95	15,559	-15.4%	47,000
16	Darmstadt 98	14,647	112.6%	30,000
17	MSV Duisburg	12,912	-23.8%	25,000
18	Bayer Leverkusen	9,594	-18.0%	20,000

== See also ==
- 1981–82 2. Bundesliga
- 1981–82 DFB-Pokal
