= Stephan Groß =

German footballer (born 1953)

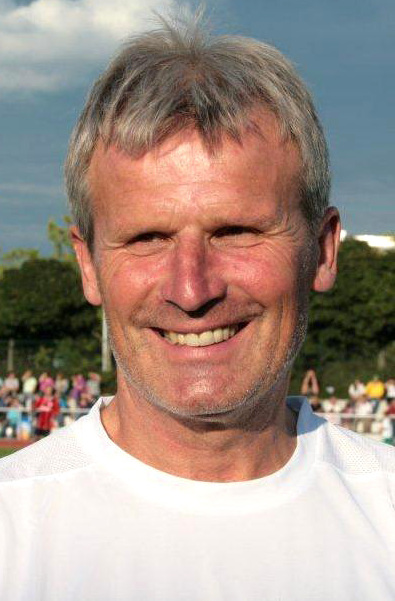
- Groß before a charity match in Karlsruhe, 2010

Personal information
- Full name: Stephan Groß
- Date of birth: 23 October 1953 (age 73)
- Place of birth: Mannheim, West Germany
- Height: 1.77 m (5 ft 10 in)
- Positions: Defender; midfielder

Youth career
- TSV Neckarau
- VfL Neckarau
- VfR Mannheim

Senior career*
Years	Team	Apps	(Gls)
1971–1972	VfR Mannheim		
1972–1974	SV Südwest Ludwigshafen		
1974–1977	SV Neckargerach		
1977–1978	VfR Mannheim		
1978–1986	Karlsruher SC	234	(50)
1986–1988	FV Weinheim		

International career
1981–1982	West Germany B	4	(0)

Managerial career
- 1987–1988: FV Weinheim
- 1989–1992: SV Sandhausen
- 2013: VfR Mannheim
- * Club domestic league appearances and goals

Stephan Groß (born 23 October 1953) is a German former professional footballer who played as a defender in the Bundesliga for Karlsruher SC.

== Club career ==
In 1971, after joining the club at youth level, Groß made the step-up to the senior squad of hometown club VfR Mannheim. One year later, Groß signed for SV Südwest Ludwigshafen, staying at the club for two years, before making the move to SV Neckargerach in 1974. Groß stayed at Neckargerach for three years, leaving the club to re-sign for VfR Mannheim in 1977 for a season.

In 1978, Groß signed for 2. Bundesliga Süd club Karlsruher SC. In 1980, Groß was part of the Karlsruhe side that achieved promotion to the Bundesliga. Groß made 113 Bundesliga appearances at Karlsruher SC, scoring 30 times, including his only Bundesliga hat-trick, and only Karlsruhe hat-trick, on 16 December 1980 in a 3–1 win against Bayer Uerdingen.

In 1986, Groß moved to FV Weinheim in a player-coach role. During Groß's time at the club, Weinheim won the Oberliga Baden-Württemberg in 1988.

== Coaching career ==
In 1989, following his spell at FV Weinheim, Groß was appointed manager of SV Sandhausen. Groß remained at Sandhausen until 1992, when he joined Kickers Offenbach as assistant manager to Hans-Jürgen Boysen.

In 2001, Groß became a youth coach at VfL Neckarau. In 2007, Neckarau youth players Pascal Groß, Manuel Gulde, Robin Szarka and Marco Terrazzino all moved to nearby professional club TSG 1899 Hoffenheim, as a direct result of Groß's coaching. In 2007, Groß joined Waldhof Mannheim as youth team manager, staying with the club until the end of the 2011–12 season.

In June 2013, Groß was appointed manager of VfR Mannheim. On 10 November 2013, Groß resigned from the club after a 4–2 loss to FC Heidenheim II.

== Personal life ==
Groß is the father to current Brighton and Hove Albion midfielder and German international Pascal Groß.
