= Heinz-Josef Koitka =

German footballer

Jupp Koitka
Personal information
- Full name: Heinz-Josef Koitka
- Date of birth: 12 February 1952 (age 74)
- Place of birth: Wattenscheid, West Germany
- Height: 1.82 m (5 ft 11 1/2 in)
- Position: Goalkeeper

Senior career*
Years	Team	Apps	(Gls)
1973–1976	SG Wattenscheid 09		
1976–1979	Eintracht Frankfurt	91	(0)
1979–1980	Rot-Weiß Lüdenscheid	27	(0)
1980–1982	Hamburger SV	23	(0)
1982–1984	Alemannia Aachen	70	(0)
1984–1987	SG Wattenscheid 09	99	(0)
1987–1990	Hamburger SV	28	(0)
- * Club domestic league appearances and goals

Heinz-Josef "Jupp" Koitka (born 12 February 1952 is a former German football player.

He started his career 1971 at SG Wattenscheid 09. Via Frankfurt he moved for the 1979–80 campaign to 2. Bundesliga Nord side Rot-Weiß Lüdenscheid and left them after a season for Hamburger SV. In total he appeared in 142 Bundesliga matches, most of them for Eintracht Frankfurt (91).

His greatest success was the German championship with Hamburger SV in 1982 after being runner-up in the previous season. In 1982, he reached the UEFA Cup final, as a backup to Uli Stein.

In 1990 Koitka finished his career at HSV. After his active career he returned to his roots and became coach and goalkeeping coach at SG Wattenscheid 09. His son Kai Koitka played for the 09ers from 2003 until 2006 as well.

Heinz-Josef Koitka was engaged at DFB responsible for the Under 21 goalkeepers and match observer.
