= Matthias Bruns =

German footballer

Personal information
- Date of birth: 19 August 1957 (age 69)
- Place of birth: Groß-Ilsede, West Germany
- Height: 1.83 m (6 ft 0 in)
- Position: Defender

Youth career
- SpVgg Groß-Bülten
- –1974: Viktoria Ölsburg
- 1974–1975: Eintracht Braunschweig

Senior career*
Years	Team	Apps	(Gls)
1975–1976	Eintracht Braunschweig Amateure		
1976–1986	Eintracht Braunschweig	201	(16)
Total		201	(16)
- * Club domestic league appearances and goals

Matthias Bruns (born 19 August 1957) is a German former professional footballer who played as a defender. He spent eight seasons in the Bundesliga with Eintracht Braunschweig, as well as two seasons in the 2. Bundesliga.
