= Thomas von Heesen =

German footballer (born 1961)

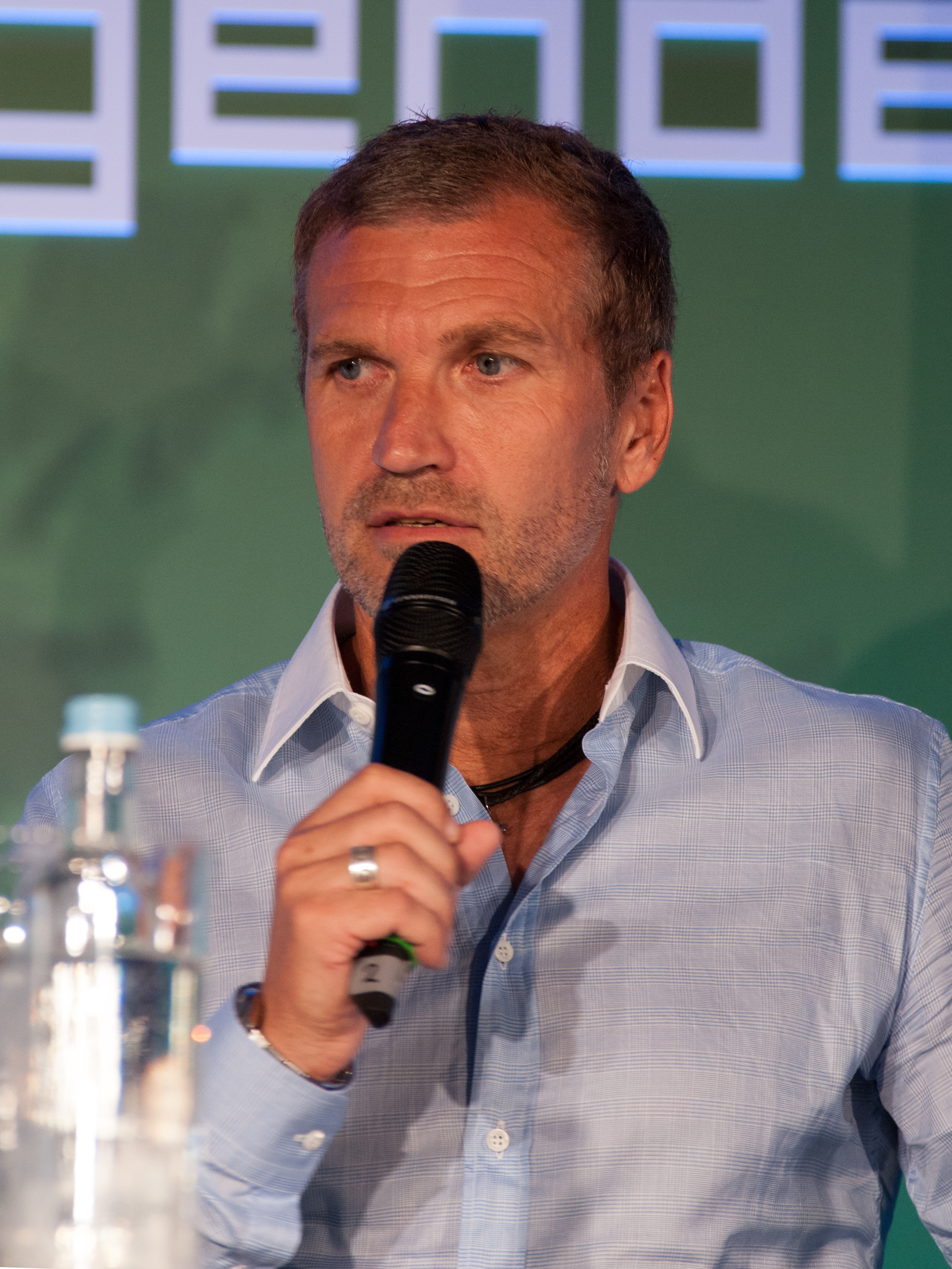
- Von Heesen in 2014

Personal information
- Date of birth: 1 October 1961 (age 65)
- Place of birth: Höxter, West Germany
- Height: 1.78 m (5 ft 10 in)
- Position: Attacking midfielder

Team information
- Current team: Khoneh Be Khoneh (assistant coach)

Youth career
- 1967–1976: DJK Albaxen
- 1976–1978: VfL Höxter
- 1978–1980: 1. FC Paderborn

Senior career*
Years	Team	Apps	(Gls)
1980–1994	Hamburger SV	368	(99)
1994–1997	Arminia Bielefeld	38	(8)
Total		406	(107)

International career
1981–1985	West Germany U21	6	(2)

Managerial career
- 1998–1999: Arminia Bielefeld
- 2000–2003: 1. FC Saarbrücken
- 2004: Arminia Bielefeld (caretaker)
- 2005–2007: Arminia Bielefeld
- 2008: 1. FC Nürnberg
- 2008–2010: Apollon Limassol
- 2011–2012: Kapfenberger SV
- 2015: Lechia Gdańsk
- 2016–: Khoneh Be Khoneh (assistant)
- * Club domestic league appearances and goals

Thomas von Heesen (born 1 October 1961) is a German football coach and former player.

An attacking midfielder, he spent most of his playing career with Hamburger SV, with which he won several accolades, both domestic and continental, appearing in nearly 400 official games for the club.

== Playing career ==
Born in Höxter, North Rhine-Westphalia, von Heesen made his professional – and Bundesliga – debuts in 1980–81 with Hamburger SV, then went on to feature prominently for the club in the following two seasons, as the club won in that timeframe two leagues and the 1982–83 European Cup (during that campaign, he netted twice in just five matches, and appeared 34 minutes in the 1–0 final win against Juventus).

Von Heesen remained with Hamburg until 1994, with exactly 99 first division goals scored. He then switched, at nearly 33, to Arminia Bielefeld, being very important in the club's return to the topflight. In the following campaign, although appearing very rarely, he found the net on 28 August 1996, in a 1–1 home draw against MSV Duisburg, for his 100th, retiring at season's end.

== Coaching career ==
Subsequently, von Heesen took up coaching. Von Heesen became interim head coach of Arminia Bielefeld after Ernst Middendorp was sacked on 17 August 1998. He was head coach for the remainder of the season when Hermann Gerland took over. His final match as head coach was a 5–3 win against 1. FC Köln where they won the 2. Bundesliga championship. He finished his tenure with a record of 20 wins, seven draws, and six losses in 33 matches. He became head coach of 1. FC Saarbrücken on 29 November 2000. His first match was a 1–0 win against Stuttgarter Kickers. He was head coach of Saarbrücken until 17 September 2001 when he became the Sporting Director for Aminia Bielefeld. His final match as Saarbrücken's head coach was a 1–0 against MSV Duisburg. He was also interim head coach of the club from 17 February 2004 when Benno Möhlmann left for Greuther Fürth to 1 March 2004 when Uwe Rapolder was appointed the new head coach and from 11 May 2005 when Rapolder was sacked to 11 February 2007 when he resigned. He finished his second tenure with one win and one draw in two matches and his third tenure with a record of 18 wins, 16 draws, and 26 losses in 60 matches.

Von Heesen was appointed as the head coach of 1. FC Nürnberg on 12 February 2008. He resigned on 28 August 2008. He finished his Nürnberg tenure with a record of four wins, eight draws, and eight losses.

Two and a half weeks later, von Heesen joined Apollon Limassol. His first match was a 2–1 win AEP Paphos on 15 September 2008. He helped the club to a fifth place in his debut season. After almost two years with the club, on 29 January 2010, he was fired. His final match was a 2–1 win against AEL Limassol.

On 29 November 2011, he was appointed as manager of the Austrian Bundesliga side Kapfenberger SV until the end of the 2011–12 season. His first match was a 0–0 draw against Rapid Wien. Von Heesen got a three-year contract extension despite Kapfenberg being relegated. On 10 November 2012, von Heesen was promoted to Sporting Director and Klaus Schmidt became the new head coach. His final match was a 4–2 loss to Lustenau.

== Coaching record ==
As of 3 March 2015

Team	From	To	Record					
Team	From	To	M	W	D	L	Win %	Ref.
Arminia Bielefeld	17 August 1998	30 June 1999	33	20	7	6	60.61	
1. FC Saarbrücken	29 November 2000	17 September 2001	27	10	4	13	37.04	
Arminia Bielefeld	17 February 2004	1 March 2004	2	1	1	0	50.00	
Arminia Bielefeld	11 May 2005	11 February 2007	60	18	16	26	30.00	
1. FC Nürnberg	12 February 2008	28 August 2008	20	4	8	8	20.00	
Apollon Limassol	14 September 2008	29 January 2010	55	30	12	13	54.55	
Kapfenberger SV	29 November 2011	10 November 2012	38	6	13	19	15.79	
Total			235	89	61	85	37.87	—

== Honours ==
=== Player ===
HSV

- European Cup: 1982–83
- Bundesliga: 1981-1982, 1982–83
- DFB-Pokal: 1986–87

=== Manager ===
Arminia Bielefeld

- 2. Bundesliga: 1998–99
