= Lars Bastrup =

Danish footballer (born 1955)

Personal information
- Full name: Lars Bastrup Jørgensen
- Date of birth: 31 July 1955 (age 71)
- Place of birth: Levring, Denmark
- Height: 1.79 m (5 ft 10 in)
- Position: Striker

Senior career*
Years	Team	Apps	(Gls)
1973–1974	Silkeborg	25	(11)
1974–1975	IHF Aarhus		
1975–1977	Offenbacher Kickers	49	(13)
1977–1979	IHF Aarhus		
1979–1981	AGF	44	(28)
1981–1983	Hamburger SV	59	(18)
1983–1984	Skovbakken		
1984–1986	Ikast fS	45	(33)

International career
1974–1975	Denmark U21	2	(0)
1975–1983	Denmark	30	(10)
- * Club domestic league appearances and goals

Lars Bastrup Jørgensen (born 31 July 1955) is a Danish former professional football player, who most prominently played as a striker for Hamburger SV, winning two Bundesliga titles and the 1983 European Cup with the club. He played 30 matches and scored ten goals for the Danish national team, and won the 1980 Danish Player of the Year award.

== Career ==
Born in Levring between Viborg and Silkeborg, Bastrup started his senior career with Silkeborg IF in 1973. He made his debut for the Danish national team in June 1975, while playing for IHF Aarhus.

In December 1975, at the age of 20, Bastrup joined German team Offenbacher Kickers in the Bundesliga. He scored two goals in 18 matches in the 1975–76 Bundesliga season, as Offenbach were relegated to the 2. Bundesliga. Bastrup chose to stay with Offenbach, and eventually lost his place in the Danish national team. In the 1976–77 2. Bundesliga season, he scored 11 goals in 27 matches as Offenbach finished third in the division and thus barely missed promotion to the Bundesliga.

He moved back to IHF Aarhus in 1977, and later went on to play for local rivals AGF Aarhus in 1979. While at AGF, he rejoined the national team in May 1980, and he was voted the 1980 Danish Player of the Year.

In 1981, he was brought back to Germany to play for Hamburger SV (HSV). With German striker Horst Hrubesch, Bastrup made up the attacking duo of the strong HSV team. Alongside prolific players like Uli Stein and Felix Magath, Bastrup won two Bundesliga championships in 1982 and 1983. On the European scene, HSV reached the 1982 UEFA Cup final, where they lost to Swedish team IFK Göteborg, as well as the 1983 European Cup final. Bastrup played in the European Cup final, which HSV won 1–0 against Italian team Juventus FC. During the match, he collided with Italian defender Claudio Gentile, suffering a broken jaw. In his first year at the club, Bastrup scored 13 goals in 34 Bundesliga games, but he only scored five goals in 25 matches during his second year.

He moved back to Denmark in 1983, signing for IK Skovbakken. He finished his career at Ikast fS in 1986, having earned the Danish top-scorer award with 20 goals in the 1985 Danish 1st Division.

== Honours ==
Hamburger SV

- Bundesliga: 1981–82, 1982–83
- European Cup: 1982–83

Individual

- Danish Player of the Year: 1980
- Danish League top scorer: 1985
- kicker Bundesliga Team of the Season: 1981–82
