= Joachim Müller (footballer, born 1961) =

German footballer

Personal information
- Date of birth: 25 March 1961 (age 65)
- Height: 1.90 m (6 ft 3 in)
- Position: Defender

Youth career
- –1979: Stuttgarter Kickers

Senior career*
Years	Team	Apps	(Gls)
1979–1986	Stuttgarter Kickers		
1986–1988	Kickers Offenbach		
- * Club domestic league appearances and goals

Joachim Müller (born 25 March 1961) is a retired German football defender.
