= Jimmy Hartwig =

German footballer

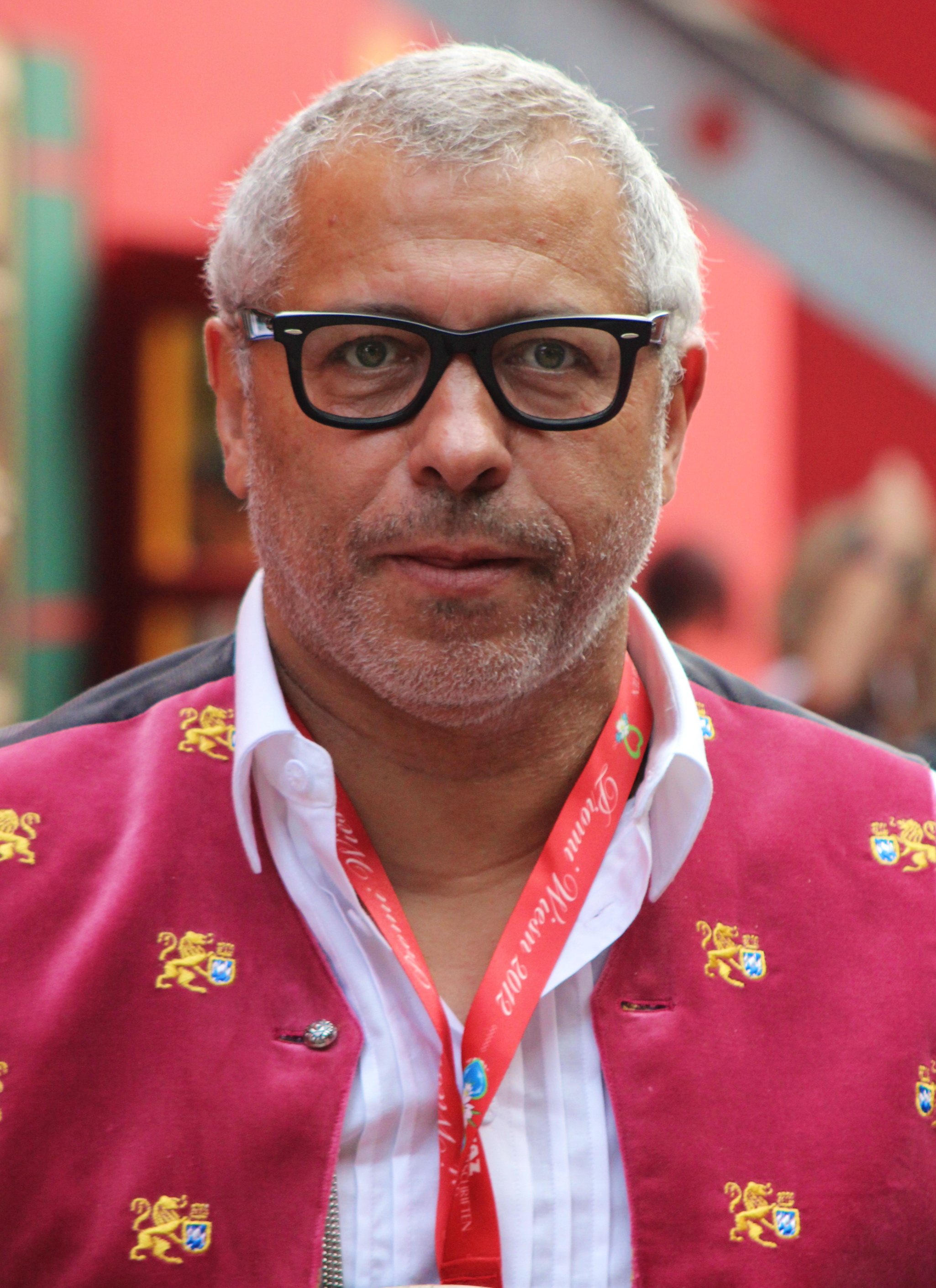
- Hartwig in 2012

Personal information
- Full name: William Hartwig
- Date of birth: 5 October 1954 (age 72)
- Place of birth: Offenbach am Main, West Germany
- Height: 1.77 m (5 ft 10 in)
- Position: Defensive midfielder

Senior career*
Years	Team	Apps	(Gls)
1973–1974	Kickers Offenbach	4	(0)
1974–1978	1860 Munich	121	(16)
1978–1984	Hamburger SV	182	(47)
1984–1986	1. FC Köln	24	(5)
1986	Austria Salzburg		
1986–1988	FC Homburg	4	(0)

International career
1979	West Germany	2	(0)

Managerial career
- 1989: FC Augsburg
- 1990: FC Sachsen Leipzig
- * Club domestic league appearances and goals

William "Jimmy" Hartwig (born 5 October 1954) is a German former professional footballer who played as a defensive midfielder. He played for Kickers Offenbach, TSV 1860 Munich, Hamburger SV, 1. FC Köln and FC Homburg of the Bundesliga and for Austria Salzburg of Austria. The son of an African-American soldier and a German mother, Hartwig was one of the first players who is of African American descent in German and Austrian football.

Hartwig won the European Cup in 1983 with Hamburger SV, and was three times German league champion in 1979, 1982 und 1983 and three times league runner-up with Hamburger SV. He also earned two caps for the West Germany national team, making him only the second non-white player (after Erwin Kostedde) to achieve this feat.

After his playing career, Hartwig worked as a coach at FC Augsburg in 1989 and FC Sachsen Leipzig in 1990. He entered the TV business, where he has been working ever since, whilst also appearing in the theatre as an actor.

== Personal life ==
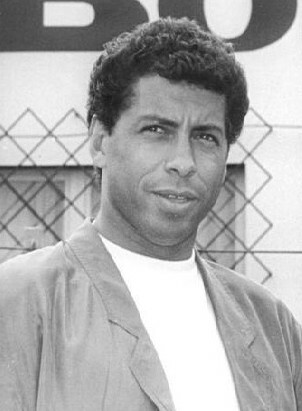
Hartwig in 1990

In his 1994 autobiography, Hartwig described his tough childhood in the city of Offenbach am Main where he was born. He recounted a childhood full of poverty and anti-black racism, with only his German mother as support; his biological African American father never took care of him.

In November 2022, he used racist anti-asian slur against the Japan national football team on WELT-TV for the 2022 FIFA World Cup.

Hartwig is married for the fourth time and has three children.

In 2021, he featured in Schwarze Adler, a documentary detailing the experiences of Black players in German professional football.

Despite his opposition against anti-black racism, he was criticized for using the word "ching chang chong" in his commentary and then bowing, which was perceived as racist against East Asians, on WELT-TV for the 2022 FIFA World Cup. The WELT management company removed the video from YouTube and Hartwig posted an apology on his Instagram.

== Singing ==
In 1980, the single Mama Calypso was released, with Sometimes on the reverse side, on the RCA label.

== Honours ==
Hamburg

- Bundesliga: 1978–79, 1981–82, 1982–83
- European Cup: 1982–83; runner-up: 1979–80
- UEFA Cup runner-up: 1981–82, 1985–86

== Autobiography ==
- Jimmy Hartwig: "Ich möchte noch so viel tun …" Meine Kindheit, meine Karriere, meine Krankheit; Bergisch Gladbach 1994; ISBN 3-404-61309-0
- Jimmy Hartwig: "Ich bin ein Kämpfer geblieben" Meine Siege, meine Krisen, mein Leben, Berlin, Siebenhaar-Verlag 2010; ISBN 3-936962-86-3
