= Jürgen Groh =

German footballer

Personal information
- Date of birth: 17 July 1956 (age 70)
- Place of birth: Heppenheim, West Germany
- Height: 1.81 m (5 ft 11 in)
- Position: Defender

Youth career
- Starkenburgia Heppenheim
- 1974–1976: VfR Bürstadt

Senior career*
Years	Team	Apps	(Gls)
1976–1980	1. FC Kaiserslautern	116	(3)
1980–1985	Hamburger SV	154	(4)
1985–1986	Trabzonspor	17	(1)
1986–1989	1. FC Kaiserslautern	81	(0)
1989–1990	SV Edenkoben	22	(0)

International career
1979–1983	West Germany	2	(0)
- * Club domestic league appearances and goals

Jürgen Groh (born 17 July 1956) is a German former professional footballer who played as a defender.

== Club career ==
He spent a dozen seasons in the Bundesliga with Hamburger SV and 1. FC Kaiserslautern.

== International career ==
Groh represented West Germany in two friendlies.

== Honours ==
Hamburger SV

- Bundesliga: 1981–82, 1982–83
- European Cup: 1982–83
- UEFA Cup runner-up: 1981–82
