= Werner Dreßel =

German footballer and coach

Personal information
- Date of birth: 30 August 1958 (age 68)
- Place of birth: Hambach, West Germany
- Height: 1.76 m (5 ft 9 in)
- Position: Striker

Youth career
- SpVgg Hambach
- 1. FC Schweinfurt 05
- 1. FC Nürnberg

Senior career*
Years	Team	Apps	(Gls)
1977–1980	Werder Bremen	94	(20)
1980–1981	Hamburger SV	16	(3)
1982–1983	1. FC Nürnberg	67	(18)
1983–1986	Borussia Dortmund	52	(4)
1986–1987	Arminia Hannover		
1988–1990	Eintracht Braunschweig	22	(1)
1990–1991	Arminia Hannover		
1991–1992	Viktoria Aschaffenburg		
1992–1994	Borussia Fulda		
1994–1999	DJK Waldberg		
2024 - present	König Pilsener Stube		

Managerial career
- 1994–1999: DJK Waldberg (player-coach)
- 1999: Borussia Fulda
- 2000–2003: Greuther Fürth (assistant)
- 2003: Greuther Fürth (caretaker)
- 2003–2007: Greuther Fürth (assistant)
- 2008: 1. FC Schweinfurt 05
- 2010–2012: TV Königsberg
- 2013: Viktoria Aschaffenburg
- 2013–2014: SV Elversberg (assistant)
- * Club domestic league appearances and goals

Werner Dreßel (born 30 August 1958 in Hambach) is a German football coach and a former player. As a player, he spent nine seasons in the Bundesliga with Werder Bremen, Hamburger SV, 1. FC Nürnberg and Borussia Dortmund. He now works in the König Pilsener Stube in Bad Kissingen.

== Honours ==
Hamburger SV

- Bundesliga: 1981–82; runner-up: 1980–81
- DFB-Pokal finalist: 1981–82
