= Holger Hieronymus =

German footballer (born 1959)

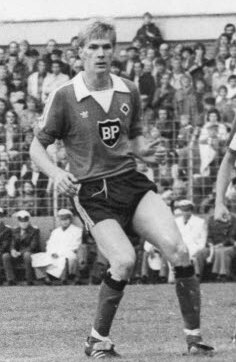
- Hieronymus in 1979

Personal information
- Date of birth: 22 February 1959 (age 67)
- Place of birth: Hamburg, West Germany
- Height: 1.80 m (5 ft 11 in)
- Position: Sweeper

Youth career
- 1966–1972: TuS Hamburg
- 1972–1978: FC St. Pauli

Senior career*
Years	Team	Apps	(Gls)
1978–1979	FC St. Pauli	30	(2)
1979–1984	Hamburger SV	121	(7)
Total		151	(9)

International career
1981–1982	West Germany	3	(0)

Managerial career
- 2001: Hamburger SV (caretaker)
- * Club domestic league appearances and goals

Holger Hieronymus (born 22 February 1959) is a German former professional footballer who played as a defender.

== Career ==
Born in Hamburg, Hieronymus started his career with local side TuS Hamburg at the age of six and was a promising talent for the sweeper position when the then Hamburger SV general manager Günter Netzer snapped him up from local counterpart FC St. Pauli for DM 75,000 following Hamburger SV's Bundesliga title in 1979. The next Bundesliga season saw the technically gifted player playing his first games, being a starter in the European Cup final defeat of his side against Nottingham Forest at the Santiago Bernabéu Stadium on 28 May 1980. Failing to claim the Bundesliga trophy of 1980 and 1981, on both occasions Hamburg finished second, Hieronymus won his first trophy in 1982 when Hamburg won the league. That same summer he and his side crashed to Sven-Göran Eriksson's IFK Göteborg in the two-legged UEFA Cup final. In 1983 his club retained the Bundesliga title and, further, beat Juventus in the European Cup final in Athens. He was back as a regular in the line-ups of Hamburg manager Ernst Happel after his career had, for some time, been called to a halt due to his club signing veteran German legend Franz Beckenbauer in November 1980.

The most tragic moment of his playing days, however, happened on 31 March 1984, in the Bundesliga tie against SV Waldhof Mannheim. With less than fifteen minutes left on the clock, Hieronymus received a career-ending injury. A cruciate ligament rupture synchronized with a deltoid ligament rupture and, together with, a caused menisci and knee cartilage damage forced him to retire in 1985, over a year after that incident. At the time he finally abandoned the hope of recovery, merely 26 years of age, the talented sweeper had played in 121 Bundesliga matches (seven goals) for Hamburger SV.

For West Germany Holger Hieronymus was capped three times in between September 1981 and October 1982, each as a substitute and just the final of those (he came on for injured Karlheinz Förster in the fifth minute in a friendly win over England at Wembley on 13 October 1982) for a duration of more than parts of the second-half. Still, he was selected by Jupp Derwall for the 1982 FIFA World Cup, staying unused throughout the competition.

== Post-playing career ==
Looking for a different occupation after his premature retirement, Hieronymus first founded a sports center for the obese and was later, together with his former teammate Ditmar Jakobs (whose career had also abruptly been ended by horrible injury), co-founder of an injury rehabilitation centre. Leaving these jobs aside, Hieronymus enjoyed a return to Hamburger SV in 1997 as the new marketing manager of Die Rothosen. From June 1998 to August 2002 he operated as general manager of the club. On 1 February 2005, he took a leading position at DFL Deutsche Fußball Liga GmbH, which can be seen as the governing entity that governs the Bundesliga competition.
