= Jürgen Milewski =

German footballer (born 1957)

Personal information
- Date of birth: 19 October 1957 (age 69)
- Place of birth: Hanover, West Germany
- Height: 1.72 m (5 ft 8 in)
- Position: Striker

Youth career
- SG Letter 05

Senior career*
Years	Team	Apps	(Gls)
1975–1978	Hannover 96	72	(33)
1978–1979	Hertha BSC	36	(4)
1980–1985	Hamburger SV	130	(48)
1985–1986	Saint-Étienne	5	(2)
1988–1989	Hamburger SV II		
Total		243	(87)

International career
1978–1980	West Germany B	6	(4)
1981	West Germany U-21	1	(0)
1981–1984	West Germany	3	(0)
- * Club domestic league appearances and goals

Jürgen Milewski (born 19 October 1957) is a German former professional footballer who played as a striker.

== Club career ==
He spent nine seasons in the Bundesliga with Hannover 96, Hertha BSC and Hamburger SV. He played the 1985–86 season with AS Saint-Étienne.

== International career ==
Milewski represented Germany in a 1982 FIFA World Cup qualifier against Albania and two friendlies.

== Career after pro times ==
The former international worked as a player agent for IMG.

== Honours ==
Hamburger SV

- European Cup: 1982–83, runner-up 1979–80
- UEFA Cup: runner-up 1981–82
- Bundesliga: 1981–82, 1982–83

Hertha BSC

- DFB-Pokal: runner-up 1978–79
