= 1976–77 Hamburger SV season =

Hamburger SV
1976–77 season
- Manager: Kuno Klötzer
- Stadium: Volksparkstadion
- Bundesliga: 6th
- DFB-Pokal: Second round
- European Cup Winners' Cup: Winners
- Top goalscorer: League: Willi Reimann (15); All: Willi Reimann (20)
- Average home league attendance: 34,647

The 1976–77 Hamburger SV season was the 30th season in the club's history and the 14th consecutive season playing in the Bundesliga. Hamburg competed in this season's editions of the Bundesliga, DFB-Pokal, and European Cup Winners' Cup.

== Season summary ==
HSV qualified for this season's European Cup Winners' Cup by having won the DFB-Pokal in the previous season. The club reached the final of the competition for the second time in club history, their first being a loss to Italian side Milan in 1967–68. HSV defeated Belgian side Anderlecht in the final on 11 May 1977, winning the match 2–0 thanks to goals by Georg Volkert and Felix Magath.

== Squad ==
No.	Pos.	Nation	Player
—	GK	GER	Rudi Kargus
—	GK	YUG	Vladimir Kovačić
—	DF	GER	Manfred Kaltz
—	DF	GER	Peter Hidien
—	DF	GER	Hans-Jürgen Ripp
—	DF	GER	Detlef Spincke
—	DF	GER	Horst Blankenburg
—	MF	GER	Peter Nogly
—	MF	DEN	Ole Bjørnmose
—	MF	GER	Caspar Memering
—	MF	GER	Klaus Zaczyk

No.	Pos.	Nation	Player
—	MF	GER	Horst Bertl
—	MF	AUT	Johann Ettmayer
—	MF	GER	Kurt Eigl
—	MF	GER	Uwe Mackensen
—	MF	GER	Klaus Winkler
—	FW	GER	Georg Volkert
—	FW	GER	Willi Reimann
—	FW	GER	Hans-Jürgen Sperlich
—	FW	GER	Felix Magath
—	FW	GER	Ferdinand Keller
—	FW	GER	Arno Steffenhagen

== Competitions ==
=== Overall record ===
Competition	First match	Last match	Starting round	Final position	Record							
Competition	First match	Last match	Starting round	Final position	Pld	W	D	L	GF	GA	GD	Win %
Bundesliga	9 August 1976	12 June 1977	Matchday 1	6th	34	14	10	10	67	56	+11	41.18
DFB-Pokal	7 August 1976	16 October 1976	First round	Second round	2	1	0	1	5	6	−1	50.00
European Cup Winners' Cup	15 September 1976	11 May 1977	First round	Winners	9	6	2	1	23	9	+14	66.67
Total					45	21	12	12	95	71	+24	46.67

Source: World Football

=== Bundesliga ===
==== League table ====
Pos	Team	Pld	W	D	L	GF	GA	GD	Pts	Qualification or relegation
4	Eintracht Frankfurt	34	17	8	9	86	57	+29	42	Qualification to UEFA Cup first round (Note: As 1. FC Köln qualified for the Cup Winners' Cup, their UEFA Cup spot was transferred to Bayern Munich.)
5	1. FC Köln	34	17	6	11	83	61	+22	40	Qualification to Cup Winners' Cup first round (Note: Hamburger SV won the 1976–77 European Cup Winners' Cup and thereby automatically qualified as defending champions.)
6	Hamburger SV	34	14	10	10	67	56	+11	38	Qualification to Cup Winners' Cup first round
7	Bayern Munich	34	14	9	11	74	65	+9	37	Qualification to UEFA Cup first round
8	Borussia Dortmund	34	12	10	12	73	64	+9	34	

Source: www.dfb.de
Rules for classification: 1) points; 2) goal difference; 3) number of goals scored.

=== DFB Pokal ===
Win	Draw	Loss

Date	Round	Opponent	Venue	Result	Scorers	Attendance	Referee
1 August 1975	First round	Schwarz-Weiß Essen	Home	4–1	Keller, Hidien, Eigl, Memering	9,600	Zuchantke
15 October 1976	Second round	Bayern Munich	Away	1–5	Hidien	26,000	Engel

=== European Cup Winners' Cup ===
Win	Draw	Loss

Date	Round	Opponent	Venue	Result	Scorers	Attendance	Referee
15 September 1976	First round First leg	ÍB Keflavík	Home	3–0	Zaczyk, Reimann, Hidien	8,000	Kopal
29 September 1976	First round Second leg	ÍB Keflavík	Away	1–1	Hidien	2,000	Perry
20 October 1976	Second round First leg	Hearts	Home	4–2	Bjørnmose, Eigl, Reimann, Kaltz	22,000	Zharkov
3 November 1976	Second round Second leg	Hearts	Away	4–1	Eigl (2), Magath (2)	25,000	Wurtz
2 March 1977	Quarter-finals First leg	MTK Budapest	Away	1–1	Volkert	14,000	Dubach
16 March 1977	Quarter-finals Second leg	MTK Budapest	Home	4–1	Reimann (2), Kaltz (pen), Zaczyk	37,000	Rauš
6 April 1977	Semi-finals First leg	Atlético Madrid	Away	1–3	Magath	30,000	Rainea
20 April 1977	Semi-finals Second leg	Atlético Madrid	Home	3–0	Capón (own goal), Reimann, Keller	61,000	Eriksson
11 May 1977	Final	Anderlecht	Neutral	2–0	Volkert, Magath	66,000	Partridge
