= 1975–76 Hamburger SV season =

Hamburger SV
1975–76 season
- Manager: Kuno Klötzer
- Stadium: Volksparkstadion
- Bundesliga: 2nd
- DFB-Pokal: Winners
- UEFA Cup: Semi-finals
- Top goalscorer: League: Peter Nogly (9); All: Willi Reimann (14)
- Average home league attendance: 32,059

The 1975–76 Hamburger SV season was the 29th season in the club's history and the 13th consecutive season playing in the Bundesliga. Hamburg competed in this season's editions of the Bundesliga, DFB-Pokal, and UEFA Cup.

The season is generally considered as the start of Hamburg's golden era of the most successful period in club history. On 26 June 1976, HSV won the DFB-Pokal, defeating 1. FC Kaiserslautern 2–0 in the final with first-half goals from Peter Nogly and Ole Bjørnmose. In the league, HSV finished as runners-up and they also reached the semi-finals of the UEFA Cup, being eliminated by Club Brugge.

Winning the DFB-Pokal secured Hamburg a place in next season's European Cup Winners' Cup.

== Squad ==
No.	Pos.	Nation	Player
—	GK	GER	Rudi Kargus
—	GK	YUG	Vladimir Kovačić
—	DF	GER	Manfred Kaltz
—	DF	GER	Peter Hidien
—	DF	GER	Hans-Jürgen Ripp
—	DF	GER	Detlef Spincke
—	MF	GER	Peter Nogly
—	MF	GER	Horst Blankenburg
—	MF	DEN	Ole Bjørnmose
—	MF	GER	Caspar Memering

No.	Pos.	Nation	Player
—	MF	GER	Klaus Zaczyk
—	MF	GER	Horst Bertl
—	MF	AUT	Johann Ettmayer
—	MF	GER	Kurt Eigl
—	MF	GER	Uwe Mackensen
—	MF	GER	Klaus Winkler
—	FW	GER	Georg Volkert
—	FW	GER	Willi Reimann
—	FW	GER	Hans-Jürgen Sperlich

== Competitions ==
=== Overall record ===
Competition	First match	Last match	Starting round	Final position	Record							
Competition	First match	Last match	Starting round	Final position	Pld	W	D	L	GF	GA	GD	Win %
Bundesliga	9 August 1975	12 June 1976	Matchday 1	2nd	34	17	7	10	59	32	+27	50.00
DFB-Pokal	1 August 1975	26 June 1976	First round	Winners	8	7	1	0	21	3	+18	87.50
UEFA Cup	17 September 1975	14 April 1976	First round	Semi-finals	10	4	4	2	15	8	+7	40.00
Total					52	28	12	12	95	43	+52	53.85

Source: World Football

=== Bundesliga ===
==== League table ====
Pos	Team	Pld	W	D	L	GF	GA	GD	Pts	Qualification or relegation
1	Borussia Mönchengladbach (C)	34	16	13	5	66	37	+29	45	Qualification to European Cup first round (Note: Bayern Munich won the 1975–76 European Cup and thereby automatically qualified as defending champions. As a consequence, their original UEFA Cup spot earned through league placement was transferred to sixth-placed Schalke 04.)
2	Hamburger SV	34	17	7	10	59	32	+27	41	Qualification to Cup Winners' Cup first round
3	Bayern Munich	34	15	10	9	72	50	+22	40	Qualification to European Cup first round
4	1. FC Köln	34	14	11	9	62	45	+17	39	Qualification to UEFA Cup first round (Note: As Hamburger SV qualified for the Cup Winners' Cup, their UEFA Cup spot was transferred to DFB-Pokal runners-up 1. FC Kaiserslautern.)
5	Eintracht Braunschweig	34	14	11	9	52	48	+4	39	Qualification to UEFA Cup first round

Source: www.dfb.de
Rules for classification: 1) points; 2) goal difference; 3) number of goals scored.
(C) Champions

=== DFB Pokal ===
==== Results ====
Win	Draw	Loss

Date	Round	Opponent	Venue	Result	Scorers	Attendance	Referee
1 August 1975	First round	FC Köln II	Home	4–0	Kaltz, Bjørnmose, Sperlich, Volkert (pen)	5,000	Halfter
18 October 1975	Second round	SV Union Salzgitter	Home	4–0	Ettmayer, Hidien, Volkert (pen), Reimann	5,800	Meijerink
13 December 1975	Third round	SC Jülich 1910	Home	4–0	Bertl (2), Reimann, Volkert (pen)	6,700	Halfter
31 January 1976	Round of 16	FC Bayern Hof	Away	2–0	Bjørnmose, Volkert	18,000	Engel
3 April 1976	Quarter-finals	FC 08 Homburg	Away	2–1	Memering, Zaczyk	20,000	Aldinger
4 May 1976	Semi-finals	Bayern Munich	Home	2–2	Bjørnmose, Nogly	52,000	Schröder
1 June 1976	Semi-finals replay	Bayern Munich	Away	1–0	Eigl	55,000	Linn
26 June 1976	Final	1. FC Kaiserslautern	Neutral	2–0	Nogly, Bjørnmose	61,000	Eschweiler

=== UEFA Cup ===
==== Results ====
Win	Draw	Loss

Date	Round	Opponent	Venue	Result	Scorers	Attendance	Referee
17 September 1975	First round First leg	BSC Young Boys	Home	0–0		17,173	Partridge
1 October 1975	First round Second leg	BSC Young Boys	Away	4–2	Reimann, Bertl (2), Bjørnmose	29,199	Franco Martínez
22 October 1975	Second round First leg	Red Star Belgrade	Away	1–1	Bjørnmose	17,137	Schiller
5 November 1975	Second round Second leg	Red Star Belgrade	Home	4–0	Reimann (2), Ettmayer, Memering	61,300	Corver
26 November 1975	Third round First leg	Porto	Home	2–0	Murça (own goal) Volkert (pen)	42,184	Somlai
12 December 1975	Third round Second leg	Porto	Away	1–2	Reimann	21,582	Wurtz
3 March 1976	Quarter-finals First leg	Stal Mielec	Home	1–1	Bertl	34,262	Ivanov
17 March 1976	Quarter-finals Second leg	Stal Mielec	Away	1–0	Nogly	23,385	Hungerbühler
31 March 1976	Semi-finals First leg	Club Brugge	Home	1–1	Reimann	50,000	Palotai
14 April 1976	Semi-finals Second leg	Club Brugge	Away	0–1		29,458	Davidson
