= 1977 German Supercup =

Deutscher Supercup
- Match programme cover
- Event: German Supercup
Borussia Mönchengladbach	Hamburger SV
3	2
- Date: 8 January 1977
- Venue: Volksparkstadion, Hamburg
- Referee: Kurt Tschenscher (Mannheim)
- Attendance: 30,000

The 1977 German Supercup was an unofficial edition of the German Supercup, a football match contested by the winners of the previous season's Bundesliga and DFB-Pokal competitions.

The match was played at the Volksparkstadion in Hamburg, and contested by league champions Borussia Mönchengladbach and cup winners Hamburger SV. Gladbach won the match 3–2 to claim the unofficial title.

== Teams ==
Team	Qualification
Borussia Mönchengladbach	1975–76 Bundesliga champions
Hamburger SV	1975–76 DFB-Pokal winners

== Match ==
=== Details ===
8 January 1977
15:30 CET

Borussia Mönchengladbach	3–2	Hamburger SV
Wimmer 25'; Bonhof 28'; Simonsen 71'	Report	Kaltz 58' (pen.); Steffenhagen 64'

Volksparkstadion, Hamburg
Attendance: 30,000
Referee: Kurt Tschenscher (Mannheim)

Borussia Mönchengladbach	Hamburger SV

GK	1	(West Germany) Wolfgang Kneib	(substituted off) 46'
RB		(West Germany) Rainer Bonhof
CB		(West Germany) Horst Wohlers
CB		(West Germany) Frank Schäffer
LB		(West Germany) Hans Klinkhammer
RM		(West Germany) Christian Kulik
CM		(West Germany) Herbert Wimmer	(substituted off) 46'
CM		(West Germany) Horst Köppel
LM		(West Germany) Uli Stielike
CF		(Denmark) Allan Simonsen
CF		(West Germany) Wilfried Hannes
Substitutes:
GK		(West Germany) Wolfgang Kleff	(substituted on) 46'
MF		(West Germany) Herbert Heidenreich	(substituted on) 46'
Manager:
(West Germany) Udo Lattek

GK	1	(West Germany) Rudi Kargus	(substituted off) 72'
RB		(West Germany) Manfred Kaltz
CB		(West Germany) Horst Blankenburg	(substituted off) 46'
CB		(West Germany) Peter Nogly
LB		(West Germany) Hans-Jürgen Ripp
CM		(Denmark) Ole Bjørnmose
CM		(Austria) Hans Ettmayer
CM		(West Germany) Klaus Zaczyk
RF		(West Germany) Arno Steffenhagen
CF		(West Germany) Ferdinand Keller
LF		(West Germany) Willi Reimann
Substitutes:
GK		(Socialist Federal Republic of Yugoslavia) Vladimir Kovačić	(substituted on) 72'
MF		(West Germany) Caspar Memering	(substituted on) 46'
Manager:
(West Germany) Kuno Klötzer

== See also ==
- 1976–77 Bundesliga
- 1976–77 DFB-Pokal
