= 1977–78 Liverpool F.C. season =

English football club season

Liverpool
1977–78 season
- Chairman: John Smith
- Manager: Bob Paisley
- First Division: 2nd
- European Cup: Winners
- FA Cup: Third round
- League Cup: Runners-up
- European Super Cup: Winners
- FA Charity Shield: Title shared
- Top goalscorer: League: Kenny Dalglish (20); All: Kenny Dalglish (31)
- Average home league attendance: 48,621
Home colours	Away colours

The 1977–78 season was Liverpool Football Club's 86th season in existence and their 16th consecutive season in the First Division. It was a season of contrasts for Liverpool as they retained the European Cup, following a 1–0 victory against Club Brugge in the final at Wembley in London, and won the European Super Cup by beating Hamburg, who included former Liverpool forward Kevin Keegan in their side, 7–1 on aggregate with a 6–0 Second Leg win at Anfield. However, in both the Football League and the Football League Cup they would end as runners-up to newly promoted Nottingham Forest managed by Brian Clough. The replay of the Football League Cup final would prove to be very controversial with a penalty that decided the match, followed by a disallowed goal when it was adjudged that Terry McDermott handled the ball.

Liverpool manager Bob Paisley bought Kenny Dalglish from Celtic for £440,000, a record transfer fee between British clubs. Dalglish went on to score 20 goals in the league and 31 in all competitions, including the winner in the European Cup Final. Realising that Ian Callaghan was nearing the end of his career at Liverpool, the club also spent £352,000 on Graeme Souness from Middlesbrough.

However, Callaghan's final season started with a call up to the England squad, and would play in the match against Switzerland on 7 September 1977 under new manager Ron Greenwood. It was to be his first cap since playing in the 1966 FIFA World Cup finals against France.

Terry McDermott's emergence would also see him make his debut in the same match with Ray Clemence, Phil Neal, Emlyn Hughes and Ray Kennedy also playing as well. Kevin Keegan also played in the match, making it seven current and former Liverpool players in that game.

== Squad ==
=== Goalkeepers ===
- (England) Ray Clemence
- (England) Peter McDonnell
- (England) Steve Ogrizovic

=== Defenders ===
- (England) Emlyn Hughes
- (Wales) Joey Jones
- (England) Brian Kettle
- (England) Alec Lindsay
- (England) Phil Neal
- (England) Tommy Smith
- (England) Phil Thompson
- (Scotland) Alan Hansen
- (England) Colin Irwin

=== Midfielders ===
- (England) Ian Callaghan
- (England) Jimmy Case
- (Republic of Ireland) Steve Heighway
- (England) Sammy Lee
- (England) Ray Kennedy
- (England) Terry McDermott
- (Scotland) Graeme Souness

=== Forwards ===
- (England) David Fairclough
- (Scotland) Kenny Dalglish
- (England) Kevin Kewley
- (Wales) John Toshack
- (England) David Johnson

== Squad statistics ==
=== Appearances and goals ===
No.	Pos	Nat	Player	Total		Division 1		FA Cup		Charity Shield		League Cup		European Cup		European Super Cup	
No.	Pos	Nat	Player	Apps	Goals	Apps	Goals	Apps	Goals	Apps	Goals	Apps	Goals	Apps	Goals	Apps	Goals
	MF	(England) ENG	Ian Callaghan	41	1	25+1	0	1+0	0	1+0	0	7+0	0	5+0	1	1+0	0
	MF	(England) ENG	Jimmy Case	51	11	30+3	5	0+0	0	1+0	0	8+0	2	7+0	4	2+0	0
	GK	(England) ENG	Ray Clemence	60	0	40+0	0	1+0	0	1+0	0	9+0	0	7+0	0	2+0	0
	FW	(Scotland) SCO	Kenny Dalglish	62	31	42+0	20	1+0	1	1+0	0	9+0	6	7+0	3	2+0	1
	FW	(England) ENG	David Fairclough	42	15	26+3	10	1+0	0	1+0	0	3+4	3	1+1	0	2+0	2
	DF	(Scotland) SCO	Alan Hansen	26	1	18+0	0	0+1	0	0+0	0	3+0	0	3+1	1	0+0	0
	MF	(Republic of Ireland) IRL	Steve Heighway	46	6	28+0	5	1+0	0	0+0	0	8+0	0	6+1	1	2+0	0
	DF	(England) ENG	Emlyn Hughes	59	1	39+0	0	1+0	0	1+0	0	9+0	0	7+0	1	2+0	0
	FW	(England) ENG	David Johnson	17	5	7+5	3	1+0	1	0+0	0	1+0	0	0+1	1	0+2	0
	DF	(Wales) WAL	Joey Jones	27	0	20+0	0	1+0	0	1+0	0	2+0	0	2+0	0	1+0	0
	MF	(England) ENG	Ray Kennedy	61	7	41+0	4	1+0	0	1+0	0	9+0	1	7+0	2	2+0	0
	FW	(England) ENG	Kevin Kewley	1	0	0+1	0	0+0	0	0+0	0	0+0	0	0+0	0	0+0	0
	MF	(England) ENG	Sammy Lee	2	1	0+2	1	0+0	0	0+0	0	0+0	0	0+0	0	0+0	0
	MF	(England) ENG	Terry McDermott	53	8	36+1	4	0+0	0	1+0	0	8+0	0	6+0	1	1+0	3
	DF	(England) ENG	Phil Neal	62	7	42+0	4	1+0	0	1+0	0	9+0	1	7+0	2	2+0	0
	GK	(England) ENG	Steve Ogrizovic	2	0	2+0	0	0+0	0	0+0	0	0+0	0	0+0	0	0+0	0
	DF	(England) ENG	Tommy Smith	34	2	22+0	2	0+0	0	0+0	0	6+0	0	4+0	0	1+1	0
	MF	(Scotland) SCO	Graeme Souness	18	2	15+0	2	0+0	0	0+0	0	0+0	0	2+1	0	0+0	0
	DF	(England) ENG	Phil Thompson	43	4	27+0	3	1+0	0	1+0	0	7+0	0	5+0	0	2+0	1
	FW	(Wales) WAL	John Toshack	5	0	2+1	0	0+0	0	0+0	0	1+0	0	1+0	0	0+0	0

== League table ==
Pos	Team	Pld	W	D	L	GF	GA	GD	Pts	Qualification or relegation
1	Nottingham Forest (C)	42	25	14	3	69	24	+45	64	Qualification for the European Cup first round (Note: Liverpool qualified for the European Cup first round as the 1977–78 European Cup winners.)
2	Liverpool	42	24	9	9	65	34	+31	57	Qualification for the European Cup first round
3	Everton	42	22	11	9	76	45	+31	55	Qualification for the UEFA Cup first round
4	Manchester City	42	20	12	10	74	51	+23	52	Qualification for the UEFA Cup first round
5	Arsenal	42	21	10	11	60	37	+23	52	Qualification for the UEFA Cup first round

Source: World Football
Rules for classification: 1) Points; 2) Goal difference; 3) Goals scored
(C) Champions

== Results ==
=== First Division ===
Date	Opponents	Venue	Result	Scorers	Attendance	Report 1	Report 2
20-Aug-77	Middlesbrough	A	1–1	Dalglish 7'	31,000	Report	Report
23-Aug-77	Newcastle United	H	2–0	Dalglish 46' McDermott 87'	48,267	Report	Report
27-Aug-77	West Bromwich Albion	H	3–0	Dalglish 18' Heighway 81' Case 85'	48,525	Report	Report
03-Sep-77	Birmingham City	A	1–0	R. Kennedy 2'	28,239	Report	Report
10-Sep-77	Coventry City	H	2–0	Fairclough 65' Dalglish 67'	45,574	Report	Report
17-Sep-77	Ipswich Town	A	1–1	Dalglish 22'	29,658	Report	Report
24-Sep-77	Derby County	H	1–0	McDermott 80'	48,309	Report	Report
01-Oct-77	Manchester United	A	0–2		55,109	Report	Report
04-Oct-77	Arsenal	A	0–0		47,110	Report	Report
08-Oct-77	Chelsea	H	2–0	Dalglish 2' Fairclough 79'	40,499	Report	Report
15-Oct-77	Leeds United	A	2–1	Case 36', 63'	45,500	Report	Report
22-Oct-77	Everton	H	0–0		51,668	Report	Report
29-Oct-77	Manchester City	A	1–3	Fairclough 29'	49,207	Report	Report
05-Nov-77	Aston Villa	H	1–2	Own goal 65'	50,436	Report	Report
12-Nov-77	Queens Park Rangers	A	0–2		25,625	Report	Report
19-Nov-77	Bristol City	H	1–1	Dalglish 12'	41,053	Report	Report
26-Nov-77	Leicester City	A	4–0	Fairclough 18' Heighway 69' Dalglish 81' McDermott 84'	26,051	Report	Report
03-Dec-77	West Ham United	H	2–0	Dalglish 37' Fairclough 82'	39,659	Report	Report
10-Dec-77	Norwich City	A	1–2	Thompson 80'	24,983	Report	Report
17-Dec-77	Queens Park Rangers	H	1–0	Neal 30' (pen.)	38,249	Report	Report
26-Dec-77	Nottingham Forest	A	1–1	Heighway 30'	47,218	Report	Report
27-Dec-77	Wolverhampton Wanderers	H	1–0	Neal 22' (pen.)	50,294	Report	Report
31-Dec-77	Newcastle United	A	2–0	Thompson 48' Dalglish 89'	36,456	Report	Report
02-Jan-78	Middlesbrough	H	2–0	Johnson 39' Heighway 80'	49,305	Report	Report
14-Jan-78	West Bromwich Albion	A	1–0	Johnson 10'	35,809	Report	Report
21-Jan-78	Birmingham City	H	2–3	Thompson 74' R. Kennedy 87'	48,401	Report	Report
04-Feb-78	Coventry City	A	0–1		28,965	Report	Report
25-Feb-78	Manchester United	H	3–1	Souness 39' R. Kennedy 49' Case 84'	49,590	Report	Report
04-Mar-78	Chelsea	A	1–3	Neal 48' (pen.)	35,550	Report	Report
08-Mar-78	Derby County	A	2–4	Fairclough 70' Dalglish 88'	23,413	Report	Report
11-Mar-78	Leeds United	H	1–0	Dalglish 47'	48,233	Report	Report
25-Mar-78	Wolverhampton Wanderers	A	3–1	Case 35' Dalglish 75', 82'	27,531	Report	Report
01-Apr-78	Aston Villa	A	3–0	Dalglish 3', 19' R. Kennedy 21'	40,190	Report	Report
05-Apr-78	Everton	A	1–0	Johnson 13'	52,759	Report	Report
08-Apr-78	Leicester City	H	3–2	Smith 42', 76' Lee 56'	42,979	Report	Report
15-Apr-78	Bristol City	A	1–1	Heighway 41'	31,471	Report	Report
18-Apr-78	Ipswich Town	H	2–2	Dalglish 58' Souness 62'	40,044	Report	Report
22-Apr-78	Norwich City	H	3–0	Own goal 4' Fairclough 35', 46'	44,857	Report	Report
25-Apr-78	Arsenal	H	1–0	Fairclough 24'	38,318	Report	Report
29-Apr-78	West Ham United	A	2–0	McDermott 38' Fairclough 66'	37,448	Report	Report
01-May-78	Manchester City	H	4–0	Dalglish 24', 55', 80' Neal 53' (pen.)	44,528	Report	Report
04-May-78	Nottingham Forest	H	0–0		50,021	Report	Report

== FA Charity Shield ==
13 August 1977
15:00 BST

Liverpool	0–0	Manchester United
	Report Report

Wembley Stadium, London
Attendance: 82,000

Liverpool	Manchester United

GK	1	(England) Ray Clemence
RB	2	(England) Phil Neal
LB	3	(Wales) Joey Jones
CB	4	(England) Phil Thompson
LM	5	(England) Ray Kennedy
CB	6	(England) Emlyn Hughes
CF	7	(Scotland) Kenny Dalglish
CM	8	(England) Jimmy Case
CF	9	(England) David Fairclough
CM	10	(England) Terry McDermott
RM	11	(England) Ian Callaghan
Substitutes:
DF	12	(England) Tommy Smith
FW	13	(England) David Johnson
DF	14	(Scotland) Alan Hansen
MF	15	(Republic of Ireland) Steve Heighway
GK	16	(England) Peter McDonnell
Manager:
(England) Bob Paisley

GK	1	(England) Alex Stepney
DF	2	(Northern Ireland) Jimmy Nicholl
DF	3	(Scotland) Arthur Albiston
MF	4	(Northern Ireland) Sammy McIlroy
DF	5	(England) Brian Greenhoff
DF	6	(Scotland) Martin Buchan (c)
MF	7	(England) Steve Coppell
MF	8	(England) Jimmy Greenhoff	Substituted off
FW	9	(England) Stuart Pearson
FW	10	(Scotland) Lou Macari
MF	11	(England) Gordon Hill
Substitutes:
MF	12	(Northern Ireland) David McCreery	Substituted on
Manager:
(England) Dave Sexton

Match rules

- 90 minutes, no extra time
- Five named substitutes
- Maximum of three substitutions

== FA Cup ==
Date	Opponents	Venue	Result	Scorers	Attendance	Report 1	Report 2
07-Jan-78	Chelsea	A	2–4	Johnson 61' Dalglish 80'	45,449	Report	Report

== Football League Cup ==
Date	Opponents	Venue	Result	Scorers	Attendance	Report 1	Report 2
30-Aug-77	Chelsea	H	2–0	Dalglish 25' Case 47'	33,170	Report	Report
26-Oct-77	Derby County	H	2–0	Fairclough 72', 75'	30,400	Report	Report
29-Nov-77	Coventry City	H	2–2	Fairclough 40' Neal 44' (pen.)	33,817	Report	Report
20-Dec-77	Coventry City	A	2–0	Case 5' Dalglish 80'	36,105	Report	Report
17-Jan-78	Wrexham	A	3–1	Dalglish 14', 58', 87'	25,641	Report	Report
07-Feb-78	Arsenal	H	2–1	Dalglish 26' R. Kennedy 81'	44,764	Report	Report
14-Feb-78	Arsenal	A	0–0		49,561	Report	Report

=== Final ===
Nottingham Forest	Liverpool

Nottingham Forest; Red shirts/White shorts/Red socks	0–0 (final score after extra time)	Liverpool; White shirts/Black shorts/White socks
Manager: (England) Brian Clough Team: 1 (England) Chris Woods (GK); 2 (England) Viv Anderson; 3 (England) Frank Clark; 4 (Scotland) John McGovern (c) (substituted off); 5 (England) Larry Lloyd; 6 (Scotland) Kenny Burns; 7 (Northern Ireland) Martin O'Neill; 8 (England) Ian Bowyer; 9 (England) Peter Withe; 10 (England) Tony Woodcock; 11 (Scotland) John Robertson; Substitute: 12 (Scotland) John O'Hare (substituted on) Scorers: None	Half-time: 0–0 Competition: Football League Cup (Final) Date: 15.00 GMT Saturday 18 March 1978 Venue: Wembley Stadium, London Attendance: 100,000 Referee: Pat Partridge Match rules: 90 minutes. 30 minutes extra-time if necessary. Match replayed if scores still level. One named substitute. Report; Report Report	Manager: (England) Bob Paisley Team: 1 (England) Ray Clemence (GK); 2 (England) Phil Neal; 3 (England) Tommy Smith; 4 (England) Phil Thompson; 5 (England) Ray Kennedy (substituted off) 91'; 6 (England) Emlyn Hughes (c); 7 (Scotland) Kenny Dalglish; 8 (England) Jimmy Case; 9 (Republic of Ireland) Steve Heighway; 10 (England) Terry McDermott; 11 (England) Ian Callaghan; Substitute: 12 (England) David Fairclough (substituted on) 91' Scorers: None

=== Final Replay ===
Nottingham Forest	Liverpool

Nottingham Forest; Yellow/Yellow shorts/Yellow socks	1–0 (final score after 90 minutes)	Liverpool; Red shirts/Red shorts/Red socks
Manager: (England) Brian Clough Team: 1 (England) Chris Woods (GK); 2 (England) Viv Anderson; 3 (England) Frank Clark; 4 (Scotland) John O'Hare; 5 (England) Larry Lloyd; 6 (Scotland) Kenny Burns (c); 7 (Northern Ireland) Martin O'Neill; 8 (England) Ian Bowyer; 9 (England) Peter Withe; 10 (England) Tony Woodcock; 11 (Scotland) John Robertson; Substitute; 12 Scorers: John Robertson (pen.)	Half-time: 0–0 Competition: Football League Cup (Final) Date: 19.45 BST, Wednesday, 22 March 1978 Venue: Old Trafford, Manchester Attendance: 54,375 Referee: Pat Partridge Match rules: 90 minutes. 30 minutes extra-time if necessary. Match replayed if scores still level. One named substitute. Report; Report Report	Manager: (England) Bob Paisley Team: 1 (England) Ray Clemence (GK); 2 (England) Phil Neal; 3 (England) Ray Kennedy; 4 (England) Tommy Smith; 5 (England) Phil Thompson; 6 (England) Emlyn Hughes (c); 7 (Scotland) Kenny Dalglish; 8 (England) Jimmy Case (substituted off) 64'; 9 (Republic of Ireland) Steve Heighway; 10 (England) Terry McDermott; 11 (England) Ian Callaghan; Substitute; 12 (England) David Fairclough (substituted on) 64' Scorers: None

== European Super Cup ==
=== First leg ===
22 November 1977
19:30 CET

Hamburg (West Germany)	1–1	(England) Liverpool
Keller 29'	Report Report	Fairclough 65'

Volksparkstadion, Hamburg
Attendance: 16,000
Referee: António Garrido (Portugal)

Hamburger SV	Liverpool

GK	1	(Germany) Jürgen Stars
DF	2	(Germany) Manfred Kaltz
DF	3	(Germany) Hans-Jürgen Ripp
DF	4	(Socialist Federal Republic of Yugoslavia) Ivan Buljan	(substituted off) 67'
MF	5	(Germany) Kurt Eigl
MF	6	(Germany) Klaus Zaczyk
MF	7	(Germany) Caspar Memering
MF	8	(Germany) Felix Magath	(substituted off) 64'
FW	9	(England) Kevin Keegan
FW	10	(Germany) Ferdinand Keller
MF	11	(Germany) Arno Steffenhagen
Substitutes:
DF		(Germany) Andreas Karow	(substituted on) 67'
MF		(Germany) Horst Bertl	(substituted on) 64'
Manager:
(Turkey) Arkoç Özcan Man of the Match: Assistant Referees:

GK	1	(England) Ray Clemence
RB	2	(England) Phil Neal
LB	3	(Wales) Joey Jones	(substituted off) 33'
CB	4	(England) Phil Thompson
LM	5	(England) Ray Kennedy
CB	6	(England) Emlyn Hughes
CF	7	(Scotland) Kenny Dalglish
CM	8	(England) Jimmy Case	(substituted off) 58'
RM	9	(Republic of Ireland) Steve Heighway
CF	10	(England) David Fairclough
CM	11	(England) Ian Callaghan
Substitutes:
DF	12	(England) Tommy Smith	(substituted on) 33'
FW	13	(England) David Johnson	(substituted on) 58'
MF	14	(England) Terry McDermott
FW	15	(Wales) John Toshack
GK	16	(England) Peter McDonnell
Manager:
(England) Bob Paisley

=== Second leg ===
6 December 1977
19:30 GMT

Liverpool (England)	6–0	(West Germany) Hamburg
Thompson 21'; McDermott; 40', 55', 56'; Fairclough 86'; Dalglish 88'	Report Report

Anfield, Liverpool
Attendance: 34,931
Referee: Ulf Eriksson (Sweden)

Liverpool	Hamburger SV

GK	1	(England) Ray Clemence
RB	2	(England) Phil Neal
LB	3	(England) Tommy Smith
CB	4	(England) Phil Thompson
LM	5	(England) Ray Kennedy
CB	6	(England) Emlyn Hughes
CF	7	(Scotland) Kenny Dalglish
CM	8	(England) Terry McDermott
RM	9	(Republic of Ireland) Steve Heighway	(substituted off) 46'
CF	10	(England) David Fairclough
CM	11	(England) Jimmy Case
Substitutes:
FW	12	(England) David Johnson	(substituted on) 46'
FW	13	(Wales) John Toshack
DF	14	(Scotland) Alan Hansen
DF	15	(Wales) Joey Jones
GK	16	(England) Peter McDonnell
Manager:
(England) Bob Paisley Man of the Match: Assistant Referees:

GK	1	(Germany) Rudi Kargus
DF	2	(Germany) Hans-Jürgen Ripp
DF	3	(Germany) Peter Nogly
MF	4	(Germany) Horst Bertl
DF	5	(Germany) Peter Hidien
DF	6	(Germany) Manfred Kaltz
FW	7	(England) Kevin Keegan
FW	8	(Germany) Ferdinand Keller	(substituted off) 69'
MF	9	(Germany) Klaus Zaczyk	(substituted off) 69'
MF	10	(Germany) Felix Magath
FW	11	(Germany) Georg Volkert
Substitutes:
MF		(Germany) Kurt Eigl	(substituted on) 69'
MF		(Germany) Arno Steffenhagen	(substituted on) 69'
Manager:
(Turkey) Arkoç Özcan

== European Cup ==
Date	Opponents	Venue	Result	Scorers	Attendance	Report 1	Report 2
19-Oct-77	(East Germany) Dynamo Dresden	H	5–1	Hansen 14' Case 21', 57' Neal 44' (pen.) Kennedy 66'	39,835	Report	Report
02-Nov-77	(East Germany) Dynamo Dresden	A	1–2	Heighway 67'	33,000	Report	Report
01-Mar-78	(Portugal) Benfica	A	2–1	Case 37' Hughes 72'	70,000	Report	Report
15-Mar-78	(Portugal) Benfica	H	4–1	Callaghan 6' Dalglish 17' McDermott 78' Neal 88'	48,364	Report	Report
29-Mar-78	(West Germany) Borussia Mönchengladbach	A	1–2	Johnson 88'	67,000	Report	Report
12-Apr-78	(West Germany) Borussia Mönchengladbach	H	3–0	Kennedy 6' Dalglish 35' Case 56'	51,500	Report	Report

=== Final ===
10 May 1978
19:15 BST

Club Brugge (Belgium)	0–1	(England) Liverpool
	Report Report	Dalglish 64'

Wembley Stadium, London
Attendance: 92,500
Referee: Charles Corver (Netherlands)

Club Brugge	Liverpool

GK	1	(Denmark) Birger Jensen
DF	2	(Belgium) Fons Bastijns (c)
DF	3	(Austria) Edi Krieger
DF	4	(Belgium) Georges Leekens
DF	5	(Belgium) Gino Maes		(substituted off) 80'
MF	6	(Belgium) Julien Cools
MF	7	(Belgium) René Vandereycken	(yellow card) 35'
MF	8	(Belgium) Dany De Cubber
MF	9	(Belgium) Jan Simoen
FW	10	(Hungary) Lajos Kű		(substituted off) 58'
FW	11	(Denmark) Jan Sørensen
Substitutes:
GK	12	(Netherlands) Leen Barth
MF	13	(Belgium) Dirk Sanders		(substituted on) 58'
DF	14	(Belgium) Jos Volders		(substituted on) 80'
FW	15	(Belgium) Raoul Lambert
FW	16	(Belgium) Bernard Verheecke
Manager:
(Austria) Ernst Happel

GK	1	(England) Ray Clemence
RB	2	(England) Phil Neal
LB	3	(Scotland) Alan Hansen
CB	4	(England) Phil Thompson
LM	5	(England) Ray Kennedy
CB	6	(England) Emlyn Hughes (c)
CF	7	(Scotland) Kenny Dalglish
RM	8	(England) Jimmy Case	(yellow card) 29'	(substituted off) 63'
CF	9	(England) David Fairclough
CM	10	(England) Terry McDermott
CM	11	(Scotland) Graeme Souness
Substitutes:
MF	12	(Republic of Ireland) Steve Heighway		(substituted on) 63'
GK	13	(England) Steve Ogrizovic
DF	14	(Wales) Joey Jones
DF	15	(England) Colin Irwin
MF	16	(England) Ian Callaghan
Manager:
(England) Bob Paisley
