= 1977 European Super Cup =

Hamburger SV	Liverpool
(West Germany)	(England)
1	7
- on aggregate

First leg
Hamburger SV	Liverpool
1	1
- Date: 22 November 1977
- Venue: Volksparkstadion, Hamburg
- Referee: António Garrido (Portugal)
- Attendance: 16,000

Second leg
Liverpool	Hamburger SV
6	0
- Date: 6 December 1977
- Venue: Anfield, Liverpool
- Referee: Ulf Eriksson (Sweden)
- Attendance: 34,931

The 1977 European Super Cup was an association football match played over two-legs between German team Hamburger SV and English team Liverpool. The first leg was played at the Volksparkstadion, Hamburg on 22 November 1977 and the second leg was played on 6 December 1977 at Anfield, Liverpool. The match was for the European Super Cup, an annual contest between the winners of the European Cup and European Cup Winners' Cup. Both teams were appearing in the competition for the first time.

The teams qualified for the competition by winning the European Cup and European Cup Winners' Cup. Hamburg won the 1976–77 European Cup Winners' Cup beating Belgian team Anderlecht 2–0 in the final. Liverpool qualified by winning the 1976–77 European Cup. They beat German team Borussia Mönchengladbach 3–1 in the final.

Watched by a crowd of 16,000 at the Volksparkstadion, Hamburg took the lead in the first half of the first leg when Ferdinand Keller scored. A David Fairclough goal in the second half levelled the match at 1–1, which remained the score when the match finished. A crowd of 34,391 saw Liverpool take the lead in the second leg when Phil Thompson scored in the 21st minute. A hat-trick from Terry McDermott and a goal each from Kenny Dalglish and Fairclough secured a 6–0 win for Liverpool. Thus, Liverpool won 7–1 on aggregate to win their first European Super Cup.

== Background ==
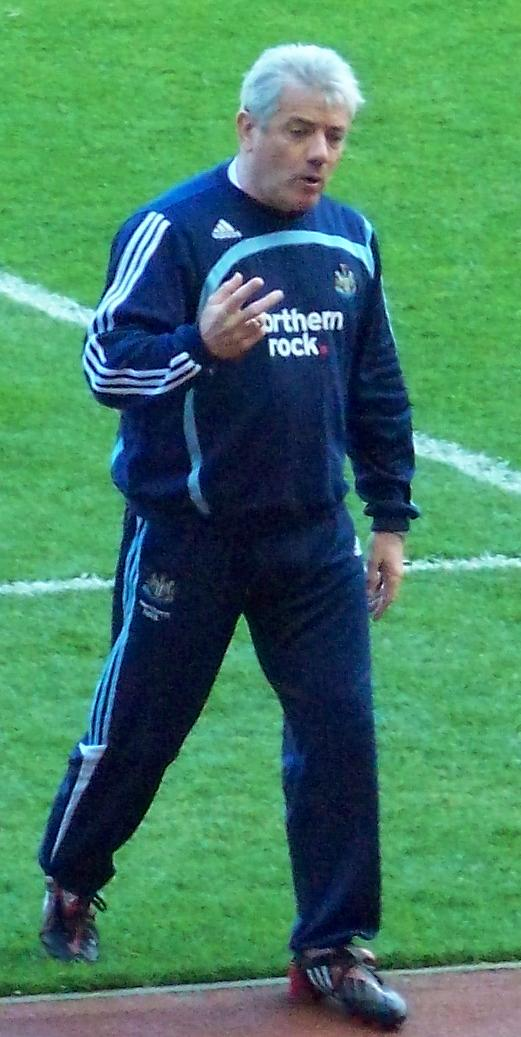
Kevin Keegan (pictured managing Newcastle United in 2008) had joined Hamburger SV from Liverpool at the start of the season.

The European Super Cup was founded in the early 1970s, as a means to determine the best team in Europe and serve as a challenge to Ajax, the strongest club side of its day. The proposal by Dutch journalist Anton Witkamp, a football match between the holders of the European Cup and Cup Winners' Cup, failed to receive UEFA's backing, given the recent Cup Winners' Cup winners Rangers had been banned from European competition. (Note: In 1972, Rangers was banned from European competition for two years after fans clashed with Spanish police while celebrating the club's victory over Dynamo Moscow in the European Cup Winners' Cup Final. The ban was later reduced to one year on appeal.) Witkamp nonetheless proceeded with his vision, a two-legged match played between Ajax and Rangers in January 1973. The competition was endorsed and recognised by UEFA a year later.

Liverpool qualified for the Super Cup as winners of the 1976–77 European Cup. They had beaten German team Borussia Mönchengladbach 3–1 in the final to win the European Cup for the first time. It was Liverpool's first appearance in the Super Cup. Hamburger SV had qualified for the competition as winners of the 1976–77 European Cup Winners' Cup. A 2–0 victory against Anderlecht ensured they won the European Cup Winners' Cup for the first time. Hamburg were also appearing in their first Super Cup match.

Both teams were midway through their respective domestic campaigns at the time of the matches. Liverpool's last game before the first leg was against Bristol City, which they drew 1–1. This result left Liverpool sixth in the 1977–78 Football League. Hamburg played Borussia Dortmund in the 1977–78 Bundesliga in their last match before the first leg, which they lost 2–1. A subplot to the matches was that Hamburg striker Kevin Keegan, would be playing against the club that he left the previous season. Keegan joined Hamburg for £500,000 following Liverpool's European Cup success. Keegan was confident in Hamburg's chances going into the match: "We're beginning to run into form, Liverpool, on the other hand, are tired physically and mentally. People don't realise they are only human. I would probably have lost the edge if I had stayed."

== First leg ==
=== Summary ===
Neither side created many chances in what Patrick Barclay, writing in The Guardian described as "a banal, unadventurous first half." Liverpool had chances to score through Jimmy Case, Ray Kennedy and David Fairclough but they were unable to convert them. Ferdinand Keller was unable to convert a headed chance into goal, but he did score in the 29th minute. Klaus Zaczyk passed to Keller whose shot went beyond Liverpool goalkeeper, Ray Clemence, to give Hamburg a 1–0 lead. Three minutes later, Joey Jones was replaced by Tommy Smith after he picked up a thigh injury from attempting a long-range shot.

The first chance of the second half fell to Fairclough when he was put through on the left hand side of the pitch but he was unable to score. Following this, midfielder Jimmy Case was replaced by striker David Johnson in the 58th minute. Hamburg made two substitutions in the 63rd and 64th minutes with Andreas Karow and Horst Bertl replacing Manfred Kaltz and Felix Magath respectively. A minute later, Liverpool had equalised. Bertl's first touch of the ball was a header from a cross by Kenny Dalglish, which caught out Hamburg goalkeeper, Jürgen Stars, and allowed Fairclough to head the ball into Hamburg goal and level the match at 1–1. Barclay stated the goal "roused Hamburg to their most animated spell" with Clemence saving a shot by Arno Steffenhagen. Stars stopped a chance from Dalglish, and Johnson was unable to convert Dalglish's cross from 5 yards (4.6 m) as his shot went over the crossbar. After the game, Liverpool manager, Bob Paisley, was satisfied with the result: "In the end, I was quite pleased. It was an encouraging performance. But I do not rate Hamburg and I did not rate them when we played them in August in a pre-season friendly." Keegan was not so positive about Hamburg's performance: "We were pathetic. The last two weeks we have played well but we were terrible tonight. Liverpool played quite well and got better as the game went on. I have mixed feelings about my return to Anfield now. If we had a 5–0 lead I would have loved it. I am still looking forward to it, but not so much."

=== Details ===
22 November 1977
19:30 CET

Hamburger SV (West Germany)	1–1	(England) Liverpool
Keller 29'	Report	Fairclough 65'

Volksparkstadion, Hamburg
Attendance: 16,000
Referee: António Garrido (Portugal)

Hamburger SV	Liverpool

GK	1	(West Germany) Jürgen Stars
DF	2	(West Germany) Hans-Jürgen Ripp
DF	3	(Socialist Federal Republic of Yugoslavia) Ivan Buljan
MF	4	(West Germany) Caspar Memering
MF	5	(West Germany) Kurt Eigl
DF	6	(West Germany) Manfred Kaltz	(substituted off) 63'
FW	7	(England) Kevin Keegan
FW	8	(West Germany) Ferdinand Keller
MF	9	(West Germany) Klaus Zaczyk
MF	10	(West Germany) Felix Magath	(substituted off) 64'
MF	11	(West Germany) Arno Steffenhagen
Substitutes:
DF	12	(West Germany) Andreas Karow	(substituted on) 63'
MF	14	(West Germany) Horst Bertl	(substituted on) 64'
Manager:
(Turkey) Özcan Arkoç

GK	1	(England) Ray Clemence
RB	2	(England) Phil Neal
LB	3	(Wales) Joey Jones	(substituted off) 33'
CB	4	(England) Phil Thompson
LM	5	(England) Ray Kennedy
CB	6	(England) Emlyn Hughes (c)
CF	7	(Scotland) Kenny Dalglish
CM	8	(England) Jimmy Case	(substituted off) 58'
RM	9	(Republic of Ireland) Steve Heighway
CF	10	(England) David Fairclough
CM	11	(England) Ian Callaghan
Substitutes:
DF	12	(England) Tommy Smith	(substituted on) 33'
FW	13	(England) David Johnson	(substituted on) 58'
MF	14	(England) Terry McDermott
FW	15	(Wales) John Toshack
GK	16	(England) Peter McDonnell
Manager:
(England) Bob Paisley

== Second leg ==
=== Summary ===
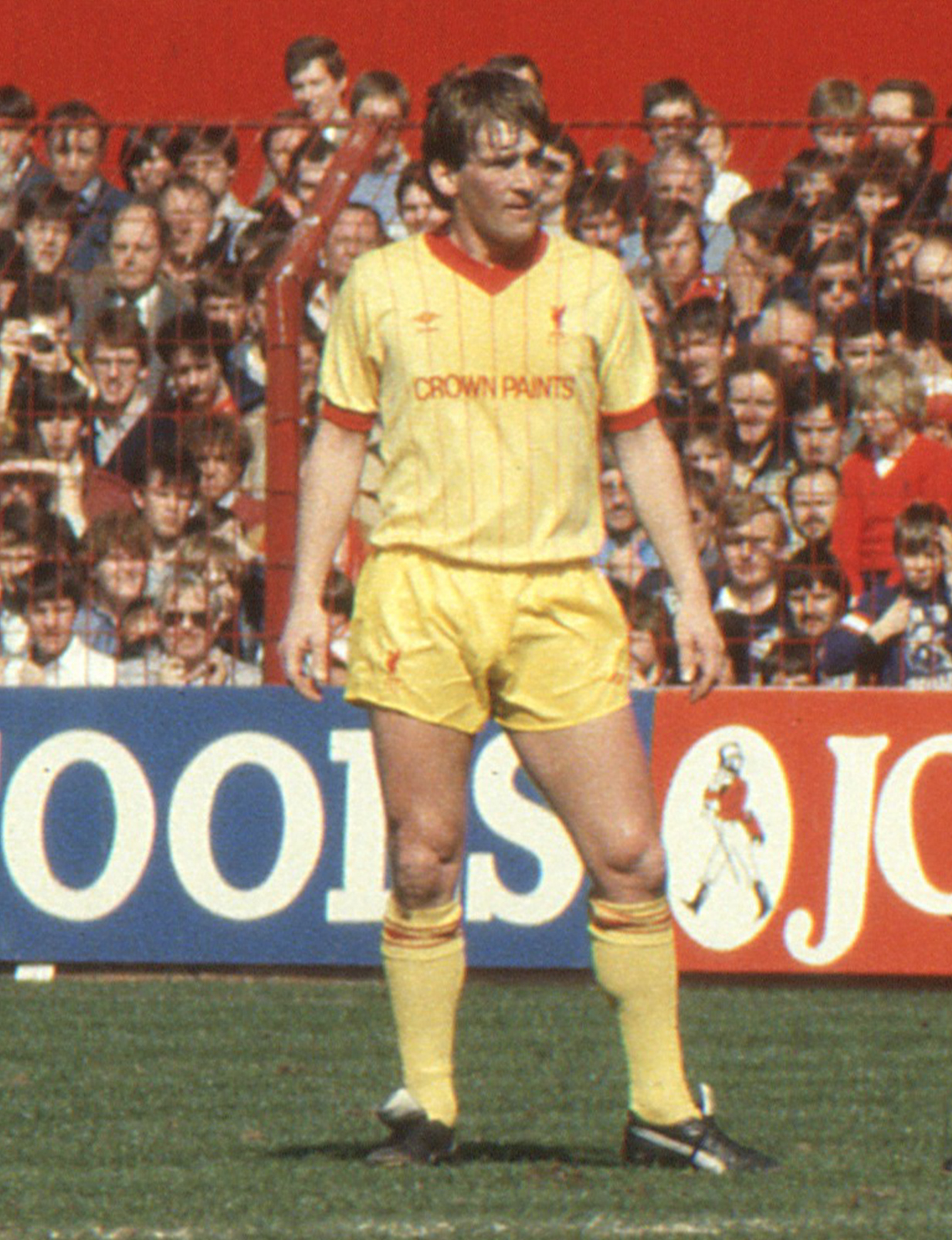
Kenny Dalglish scored Liverpool's sixth goal in the second leg.

Liverpool opened the scoring to the match in the 21st minute when, following a corner by Steve Heighway, the ball fell to Phil Thompson whose shot went in off the post to give Liverpool the lead. Liverpool extended their lead in the 40th minute when Terry McDermott chested down a pass by Kennedy and scored from the right-hand side of the penalty area. Heighway was replaced by Johnson at the start of the second half, and ten minutes later Liverpool had scored a third. McDermott scored again as he intercepted the ball and ran down the right-hand side of the pitch before his shot went into the top-right corner of the Hamburg goal. A minute later, McDermott scored his third and Liverpool's fourth off the match after he received a pass from Kennedy down the left-hand side of the pitch. McDermott became the first player to score a hat-trick in the Super Cup. Liverpool added a further two goals in the final minutes as Fairclough scored with a header and Dalglish scored a sixth goal two minutes later. Liverpool won the match 6–0 and a 7–1 aggregate victory meant they won their first European Super Cup.

=== Details ===
6 December 1977
19:30 GMT

Liverpool (England)	6–0	(West Germany) Hamburger SV
Thompson 21'; McDermott 40', 55', 56'; Fairclough 86'; Dalglish 88'	Report

Anfield, Liverpool
Attendance: 34,931
Referee: Ulf Eriksson (Sweden)

Liverpool	Hamburger SV

GK	1	(England) Ray Clemence
RB	2	(England) Phil Neal
LB	3	(England) Tommy Smith
CB	4	(England) Phil Thompson
LM	5	(England) Ray Kennedy
CB	6	(England) Emlyn Hughes (c)
CF	7	(Scotland) Kenny Dalglish
CM	8	(England) Terry McDermott
RM	9	(Republic of Ireland) Steve Heighway	(substituted off) 46'
CF	10	(England) David Fairclough
CM	11	(England) Jimmy Case
Substitutes:
FW	12	(England) David Johnson	(substituted on) 46'
FW	13	(Wales) John Toshack
DF	14	(Scotland) Alan Hansen
DF	15	(Wales) Joey Jones
GK	16	(England) Peter McDonnell
Manager:
(England) Bob Paisley

GK	1	(West Germany) Rudi Kargus
DF	2	(West Germany) Hans-Jürgen Ripp
DF	3	(West Germany) Peter Nogly (c)
MF	4	(West Germany) Horst Bertl
DF	5	(West Germany) Peter Hidien
DF	6	(West Germany) Manfred Kaltz
FW	7	(England) Kevin Keegan
FW	8	(West Germany) Ferdinand Keller	(substituted off) 69'
MF	9	(West Germany) Klaus Zaczyk	(substituted off) 69'
MF	10	(West Germany) Felix Magath
FW	11	(West Germany) Georg Volkert
Substitutes:
DF	12	(West Germany) Andreas Karow
MF	13	(West Germany) Kurt Eigl	(substituted on) 69'
MF	14	(West Germany) Arno Steffenhagen	(substituted on) 69'
GK	15	(West Germany) Jürgen Stars
Manager:
(Turkey) Özcan Arkoç

Man of the Match:
Terry McDermott (Liverpool)

== Post-match ==
Keegan praised his former team after the second leg: "I'd heard Liverpool hadn't been doing too well but from where I was stood watching there didn't seem to be much wrong with them, there were no cracks and they look as strong, if not stronger, than they ever were." McDermott was adamant that his performance in the second leg was a turning point in his Liverpool career: "Someone was injured, I think it may have been Ian Callaghan. I was moved in rather than be out wide on the right. I scored a hat-trick and I always remember John Toshack saying: 'That's your position'. I got the confidence from John Toshack saying a thing like that. He probably won't remember, but I do."

Following the Super Cup, Liverpool were still competing in the 1977–78 European Cup. They reached the final where they faced Club Brugge, a match they won 1–0 to retain the title they had won the previous season. They were unable to win the 1977–78 First Division finishing second, seven points behind eventual winners Nottingham Forest.

Hamburg were eliminated in the second round of the 1977–78 European Cup Winners' Cup by eventual winners, Anderlecht of Belgium. They finished the 1977–78 Bundesliga in tenth, fourteen points behind winners, 1. FC Köln.

== See also ==
- 1977–78 European Cup
- 1977–78 European Cup Winners' Cup
- 1977–78 Liverpool F.C. season
- Liverpool F.C. in international football

== Bibliography ==
- Kelly, Stephen F. (1988). You'll Never Walk Alone. London: Queen Anne Press. ISBN 0-356-19594-5.
- Liversedge, Stan (1991). Liverpool: The Official Centenary History, 1892–1992. London: Hamlyn Publishing Group. ISBN 0-600-57308-7.
- Pead, Brian (1986). Liverpool: A Complete Record. Derby: Breedon Books. ISBN 0-907969-15-1.
- Wilson, Jonathan; Murray, Scott (2013). The Anatomy of Liverpool: A History in Ten Matches. London: Orion. ISBN 978-1-4091-2692-8.
