= 1977 European Cup Winners' Cup final =

- Match programme cover
- Event: 1976–77 European Cup Winners' Cup
Anderlecht	Hamburger SV
(Belgium)	(West Germany)
0	2
- Date: 11 May 1977
- Venue: Olympisch Stadion, Amsterdam
- Referee: Pat Partridge (England)
- Attendance: 66,000

The 1977 European Cup Winners' Cup Final was a football match contested between the defending champions, Anderlecht of Belgium and Hamburger SV of West Germany. It was the final match of the 1976–77 European Cup Winners' Cup tournament and the 17th European Cup Winners' Cup final in history. The final was held at Olympisch Stadion in Amsterdam, Netherlands (the venue was decided in Bern by the UEFA Executive Committee on 17 September 1976). Hamburg won the match 2–0 thanks to goals by Georg Volkert and Felix Magath.

== Route to the final ==
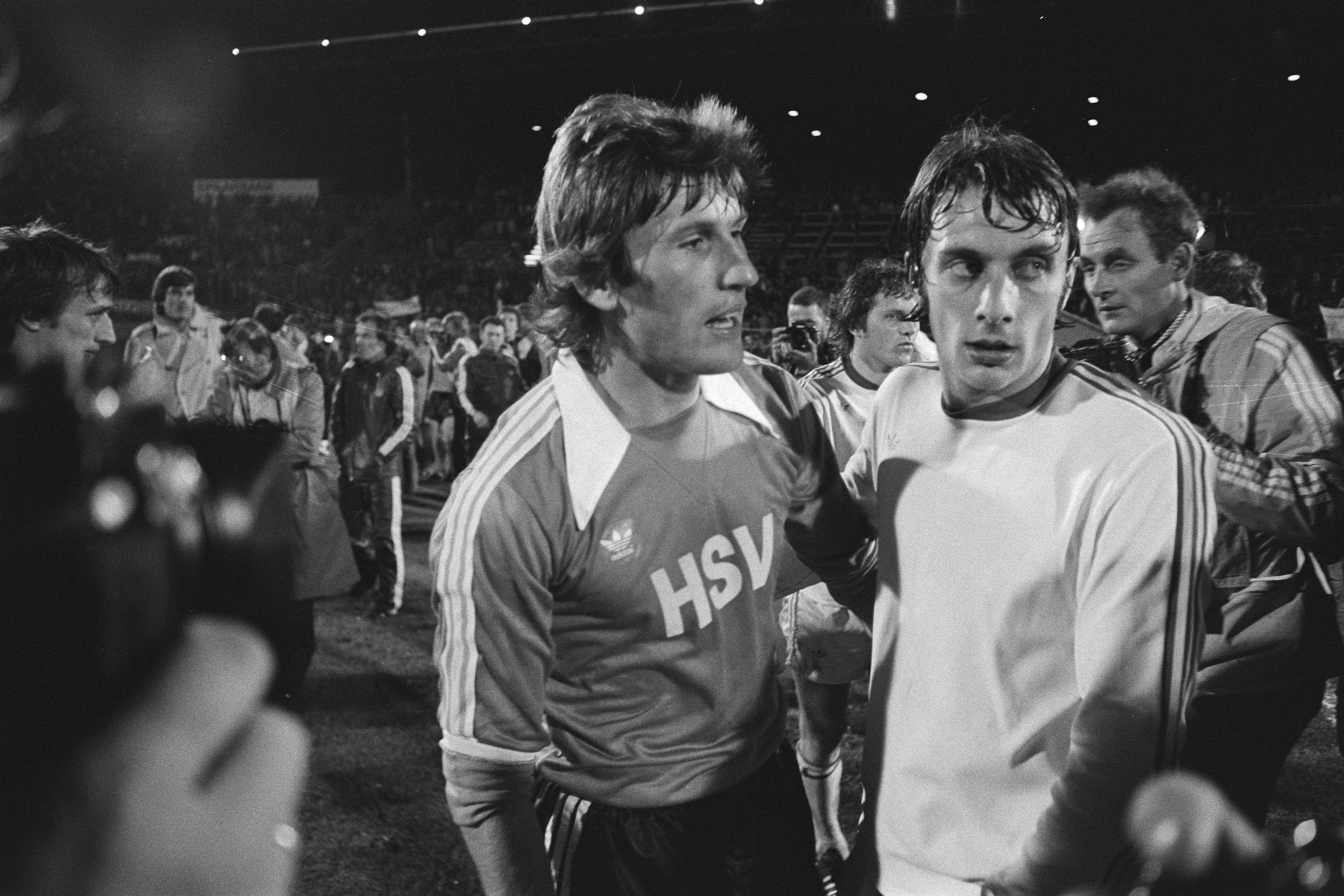
Manfred Kaltz and Gilbert Van Binst

(Belgium) Anderlecht					(West Germany) Hamburger SV			
Opponent	Agg.	1st leg	2nd leg		Opponent	Agg.	1st leg	2nd leg
(Netherlands) Roda	5–3	2–1 (H)	3–2 (A)	First round	(Iceland) Keflavík	4–1	3–0 (H)	1–1 (A)
(Turkey) Galatasaray	10–2	5–1 (H)	5–1 (A)	Second round	(Scotland) Heart of Midlothian	8–3	4–2 (H)	4–1 (A)
(England) Southampton	3–2	2–0 (H)	1–2 (A)	Quarter-finals	(Hungary) MTK Budapest	5–2	1–1 (A)	4–1 (H)
(Italy) Napoli	2–1	0–1 (A)	2–0 (H)	Semi-finals	(Spain) Atlético Madrid	4–3	1–3 (A)	3–0 (H)

== Match details ==
11 May 1977

Anderlecht (Belgium)	0–2	(West Germany) Hamburger SV
	Report	Volkert 78' (pen.); Magath 88'

Olympisch Stadion, Amsterdam
Attendance: 66,000
Referee: Pat Partridge (England)

Anderlecht	Hamburger SV

GK	1	(Netherlands) Jan Ruiter
DF	2	(Belgium) Gilbert Van Binst
DF	3	(Belgium) Hugo Broos
DF	4	(Belgium) Erwin Vandendaele (c)
DF	5	(Belgium) Jean Thissen
MF	6	(Belgium) Jean Dockx	Substituted off
MF	7	(Belgium) François Van der Elst
MF	8	(Netherlands) Arie Haan
FW	9	(Netherlands) Peter Ressel
MF	10	(Belgium) Ludo Coeck
FW	11	(Netherlands) Rob Rensenbrink
Substitutes:
FW	15	(Netherlands) Ronny van Poucke	Substituted on
Manager:
(Belgium) Raymond Goethals

GK	1	(West Germany) Rudi Kargus
DF	2	(West Germany) Manfred Kaltz
DF	3	(West Germany) Peter Nogly (c)
MF	4	(West Germany) Caspar Memering
DF	5	(West Germany) Peter Hidien
DF	6	(West Germany) Hans-Jürgen Ripp
FW	7	(West Germany) Arno Steffenhagen
MF	8	(West Germany) Ferdinand Keller
FW	9	(West Germany) Willi Reimann
MF	10	(West Germany) Felix Magath
FW	11	(West Germany) Georg Volkert
Manager:
(West Germany) Kuno Klötzer

== See also ==
- R.S.C. Anderlecht in European football
