= 1980 European Cup final =

- Match programme cover
- Event: 1979–80 European Cup
Nottingham Forest	Hamburger SV
(England)	(West Germany)
1	0
- Date: 28 May 1980
- Venue: Santiago Bernabéu Stadium, Madrid
- Referee: António Garrido (Portugal)
- Attendance: 51,000

The 1980 European Cup final was a football match held at the Santiago Bernabéu Stadium in Madrid, Spain on 28 May 1980, to determine the winner of the 1979–80 European Cup. The final saw defending champions Nottingham Forest of England defeat Hamburg of West Germany by a score of 1–0. In the 21st minute, John Robertson squeezed a shot past Hamburg keeper Rudi Kargus for the only goal of the game, and Forest then defended solidly, to give Nottingham Forest back-to-back European Cup titles.

== Route to the final ==
Nottingham Forest				Round	Hamburger SV			
Opponent	Agg.	1st leg	2nd leg		Opponent	Agg.	1st leg	2nd leg
(Sweden) Östers IF	3–1	2–0 (H)	1–1 (A)	First round	(Iceland) Valur	5–1	3–0 (A)	2–1 (H)
(Romania) Argeș Pitești	4–1	2–0 (H)	2–1 (A)	Second round	(Soviet Union) Dinamo Tbilisi	6–3	3–1 (H)	3–2 (A)
(East Germany) Dynamo Berlin	3–2	0–1 (H)	3–1 (A)	Quarter-finals	(Socialist Federal Republic of Yugoslavia) Hajduk Split	3–3 (a)	1–0 (H)	2–3 (A)
(Netherlands) Ajax	2–1	2–0 (H)	0–1 (A)	Semi-finals	(Spain) Real Madrid	5–3	0–2 (A)	5–1 (H)

== Match ==
=== Details ===
28 May 1980
20:30 CEST

Nottingham Forest (England)	1–0	(West Germany) Hamburger SV
Robertson 20'	Report

Santiago Bernabéu Stadium, Madrid
Attendance: 51,000
Referee: António Garrido (Portugal)

Nottingham Forest	Hamburger SV

GK	1	(England) Peter Shilton
RB	2	(England) Viv Anderson
CB	5	(England) Larry Lloyd
CB	6	(Scotland) Kenny Burns	(yellow card) 21'
LB	3	(Scotland) Frank Gray		(substituted off) 78'
CM	8	(England) Ian Bowyer
CM	4	(Scotland) John McGovern (c)
CM	10	(England) Gary Mills		(substituted off) 67'
RW	7	(Northern Ireland) Martin O'Neill
LW	11	(Scotland) John Robertson
CF	9	(England) Garry Birtles
Substitutes:
MF	12	(Scotland) John O'Hare		(substituted on) 67'
MF	15	(England) Bryn Gunn		(substituted on) 78'
GK		(England) Jimmy Montgomery
DF		(England) David Needham
Manager:
(England) Brian Clough

GK	1	(West Germany) Rudi Kargus
CB	5	(Socialist Federal Republic of Yugoslavia) Ivan Buljan
CB	3	(West Germany) Peter Nogly	(yellow card) 72'
CB	4	(West Germany) Ditmar Jakobs
RM	2	(West Germany) Manfred Kaltz
CM	6	(West Germany) Holger Hieronymus		(substituted off) 46'
CM	10	(West Germany) Felix Magath (c)
LM	8	(West Germany) Caspar Memering
AM	7	(England) Kevin Keegan
CF	11	(West Germany) Willi Reimann
CF	9	(West Germany) Jürgen Milewski
Substitutes:
MF	14	(West Germany) Horst Hrubesch		(substituted on) 46'
Manager:
(Socialist Federal Republic of Yugoslavia) Branko Zebec

== See also ==
- 1979–80 Nottingham Forest F.C. season
- 1980 European Cup Winners' Cup final
- 1980 European Super Cup
- 1980 UEFA Cup final
- Nottingham Forest F.C. in European football
