= Tuana Mahmoud =

Turkish-German football player (born 2003)

Personal information
- Full name: Tuana Shahnis Cindy Mahmoud
- Date of birth: 3 March 2003 (age 23)
- Place of birth: Abbehausen, Nordenham, Lower Saxony, Germany
- Height: 1.66 m (5 ft 5 in)
- Position: Forward

Team information
- Current team: Werder Bremen
- Number: 11

Youth career
- 2017: TSV Abbehausen
- 2017–2020: Werder Bremen

Senior career*
Years	Team	Apps	(Gls)
2017–2020	Werder Bremen U15, U17	40	(14)
2020	Werder Bremen II	2	(2)
2020–	Werder Bremen	94	(2)

International career^{‡}
2017–2018	Germany U15	4	(0)
2019	Germany U16	9	(1)
2019–2020	Germany U17	5	(0)
2022	Germany U19	3	(2)
2022–2023	Germany U20	4	(0)
2024–2025	Germany U23	10	(3)
2026–	Turkey	2	(0)
- * Club domestic league appearances and goals as of 21 November 2026 ‡ National team caps and goals as of 13 October 2026

Tuana Shahnis Cindy Mahmoud (born Tuana Shahnis Cindy Keleş; 3 March 2003), shortly called as Tuana Keleş or Tuana Mahmoud, is a professional footballer who plays as a forward for Frauen-Bundesliga club Werder Bremen. Born in Germany, and having previously represented her country of birth at the youth national level, she plays for the Turkey national team.

== Club career ==
Mahmoud started her football career joining the U11 team of TSV Abbehausen in her hometown Nordenham. She then transferred to the youth academy of Werder Bremen. In 2018, she was part of the club's U15 team. In the 2018–19 season, she was included in the U17 team, and played in the U17 Frauen-Bundesliga until the 2019–20 season was cut short due to the COVID-19 pandemic in Germany. For the 2020–21 season, she was permanently promoted to the senior-level team of Werder Bremen to play in the topflight Frauen-Bundesliga.

In August 2021, her initial club, TSV Abbehausen, received a training compensation payment of €2,450 from the German Football Association (DFB). This payment recognized the club's contribution to Mahmoud's footballing development, specifically the support that enabled her to make the leap to the Women's Bundesliga as well as her appearances for the Germany U15, U16, and U17 national teams.

In June 2023, she extended her expiring contract with green-white colored Frauen-Bundesliga club Werder Bremen. In the 2023–24 Frauen-Bundesliga season, she was instrumental to keep her team out of the relegation zone.

In February 2026, she extended her contract with Werder Bremen despite several offers from within the country and abroad.

== International career ==
=== Germany ===
Over a period of five years, Mahmoud made a total of 25 appearances for the German youth national teams including the U15, U16, U17, U19, and U20 teams, scoring a total of three goals. She made her international debut with the U15 national team in a friendly match against the United States girls' U15 team in Wetzlar, Germany on 3 November 2017.

In October 2018, she was invited by the DFB to take part in a course at the Germany U16 national team's scouting camp. She scored her first international goal during the 2019 Nordic Cup in Sweden, competing with the U16 national team. She netted the opening goal of the final against England's U16 team on 8 July 2019.

Mahmoud also played for the U20 national team at the 2022 FIFA U-20 Women's World Cup in Costa Rica, appearing in all three of the team's Group B matches.

Following the reactivation of the U23 national team for the 2024 season, she played in the friendly match against the France's U23 team in Frankfurt am Main on 24 October, and scored a goal. She scored a goal in the friendly game against Spain U23 team on 28 November 2024, and another goal in the friendly match against the United States U23 team on 2 June 2025.

=== Turkey ===
After having been progressed through the entire youth setup at the German Football Association (DFB), from the U15s to the U23s, Mahmoud announced in September 2026 that she had opted to switch her national association affiliation to Turkey, describing her move as a "decision from the heart."

In October 2026, she was called up to the Turkey women's national football team to play in the 2027 FIFA Women's World Cup qualification – UEFA play-offs matches. She debuted in the game against Slovenia in Istanbul, Turkey on 9 October 2026. Her second appearance for the national team followed in the return match of the play-offs in Domžale, Slovenia.

== Personal life ==
Mahmoud was born in Abbehausen in the city of Nordenham, Saxony, Germany, on 3 March 2003. She is of Turkish descent, and has double citizenship for Germany and Turkey. After marriage, she took the family name Mahmoud.
