= 1978–79 Bundesliga =

16th season of the Bundesliga

Bundesliga
- Season: 1978–79
- Dates: 11 August 1978 – 9 June 1979
- Champions: Hamburger SV; 1st Bundesliga title 4th German title
- Relegated: Arminia Bielefeld; 1. FC Nürnberg; SV Darmstadt 98
- European Cup: Hamburger SV
- Cup Winners' Cup: Fortuna Düsseldorf
- UEFA Cup: VfB Stuttgart; 1. FC Kaiserslautern; FC Bayern Munich; Eintracht Frankfurt; Borussia Mönchengladbach (title holders)
- Goals: 946
- Average goals/game: 3.09
- Top goalscorer: Klaus Allofs (22)
- Biggest home win: Düsseldorf 7–1 Bayern Munich (9 December 1978)
- Biggest away win: M'gladbach 1–7 Bayern Munich (24 March 1979); Darmstadt 1–7 Stuttgart (9 June 1979)
- Highest scoring: 7 games with 8 goals each

The 1978–79 Bundesliga was the 16th season of the Bundesliga, West Germany's premier football league. It began on 11 August 1978 and ended on 9 June 1979. 1. FC Köln were the defending champions.

== Competition modus ==
Every team played two games against each other team, one at home and one away. Teams received two points for a win and one point for a draw. If two or more teams were tied on points, places were determined by goal difference and, if still tied, by goals scored. The team with the most points were crowned champions while the three teams with the fewest points were relegated to their respective 2. Bundesliga divisions.

== Team changes to 1978–79 ==
TSV 1860 Munich, 1. FC Saarbrücken and FC St. Pauli were relegated to the 2. Bundesliga after finishing in the last three places during 1977–78. They were replaced by Arminia Bielefeld, winners of the 2. Bundesliga Northern Division, SV Darmstadt 98, winners of the Southern Division and 1. FC Nürnberg, who won a two-legged promotion play-off against Rot-Weiss Essen.

== Team overview ==
Location of teams in Bundesliga 1978–79

Club	Location	Ground	Capacity
Hertha BSC Berlin	Berlin	Olympiastadion	100,000
Arminia Bielefeld	Bielefeld	Stadion Alm	35,000
VfL Bochum	Bochum	Ruhrstadion	40,000
Eintracht Braunschweig	Braunschweig	Eintracht-Stadion	38,000
SV Werder Bremen	Bremen	Weserstadion	32,000
SV Darmstadt 98	Darmstadt	Stadion am Böllenfalltor	30,000
Borussia Dortmund	Dortmund	Westfalenstadion	54,000
MSV Duisburg	Duisburg	Wedaustadion	38,500
Fortuna Düsseldorf	Düsseldorf	Rheinstadion	59,600
Eintracht Frankfurt	Frankfurt	Waldstadion	62,000
Hamburger SV	Hamburg	Volksparkstadion	80,000
1. FC Kaiserslautern	Kaiserslautern	Stadion Betzenberg	42,000
1. FC Köln	Cologne	Müngersdorfer Stadion	61,000
Borussia Mönchengladbach	Mönchengladbach	Bökelbergstadion	34,500
FC Bayern Munich	Munich	Olympiastadion	80,000
1. FC Nürnberg	Nuremberg	Städtisches Stadion	64,238
FC Schalke 04	Gelsenkirchen	Parkstadion	70,000
VfB Stuttgart	Stuttgart	Neckarstadion	72,000

== League table ==
Pos	Team	Pld	W	D	L	GF	GA	GD	Pts	Qualification or relegation
1	Hamburger SV (C)	34	21	7	6	78	32	+46	49	Qualification to European Cup first round
2	VfB Stuttgart	34	20	8	6	73	34	+39	48	Qualification to UEFA Cup first round (Note: Borussia Mönchengladbach won the 1978–79 UEFA Cup and thereby automatically qualified as defending champions.)
3	1. FC Kaiserslautern	34	16	11	7	62	47	+15	43	Qualification to UEFA Cup first round
4	Bayern Munich	34	16	8	10	69	46	+23	40	Qualification to UEFA Cup first round
5	Eintracht Frankfurt	34	16	7	11	50	49	+1	39	Qualification to UEFA Cup first round
6	1. FC Köln	34	13	12	9	55	47	+8	38	
7	Fortuna Düsseldorf	34	13	11	10	70	59	+11	37	Qualification to Cup Winners' Cup first round
8	VfL Bochum	34	10	13	11	47	46	+1	33	
9	Eintracht Braunschweig	34	10	13	11	50	55	−5	33	
10	Borussia Mönchengladbach	34	12	8	14	50	53	−3	32	Qualification to UEFA Cup first round
11	Werder Bremen	34	10	11	13	48	60	−12	31	
12	Borussia Dortmund	34	10	11	13	54	70	−16	31	
13	MSV Duisburg	34	12	6	16	43	56	−13	30	
14	Hertha BSC	34	9	11	14	40	50	−10	29	
15	Schalke 04	34	9	10	15	55	61	−6	28	
16	Arminia Bielefeld (R)	34	9	8	17	43	56	−13	26	Relegation to 2. Bundesliga
17	1. FC Nürnberg (R)	34	8	8	18	36	67	−31	24	Relegation to 2. Bundesliga
18	SV Darmstadt 98 (R)	34	7	7	20	40	75	−35	21	Relegation to 2. Bundesliga

Source: www.dfb.de
Rules for classification: 1) points; 2) goal difference; 3) number of goals scored.
(C) Champions; (R) Relegated

== Results ==
Home \ Away	BSC	DSC	BOC	EBS	SVW	D98	BVB	DUI	F95	SGE	HSV	FCK	KOE	BMG	FCB	FCN	S04	VFB
Hertha BSC	—	1–2	1–1	2–2	0–2	1–0	4–0	1–0	4–1	4–1	1–3	0–3	0–2	1–0	1–1	4–1	1–1	0–0
Arminia Bielefeld	0–0	—	1–2	2–2	1–3	5–0	4–3	1–1	2–0	0–0	0–0	0–1	1–0	0–2	0–2	2–0	3–2	1–1
VfL Bochum	1–0	1–0	—	3–0	3–0	1–2	4–1	0–0	2–2	0–0	2–1	2–2	2–5	0–0	0–1	2–1	2–2	1–2
Eintracht Braunschweig	0–1	5–2	1–0	—	1–1	4–1	2–2	0–2	1–1	0–0	1–0	0–0	1–0	3–0	0–0	3–1	2–1	2–2
Werder Bremen	1–1	1–0	3–3	3–1	—	3–0	4–4	3–2	1–1	0–2	1–1	3–1	1–1	3–1	1–1	3–1	3–1	0–2
Darmstadt 98	0–0	1–1	3–1	1–1	3–0	—	3–2	2–0	1–6	2–0	1–2	2–2	0–1	2–0	1–3	1–3	1–2	1–7
Borussia Dortmund	3–0	2–0	2–2	2–2	1–0	0–0	—	4–1	3–0	3–1	1–3	2–3	0–0	1–1	1–0	2–0	2–0	4–3
MSV Duisburg	3–2	1–1	1–0	1–0	2–0	4–4	0–0	—	1–2	0–2	0–2	3–1	2–1	0–3	3–1	1–0	2–1	3–1
Fortuna Düsseldorf	3–1	3–2	1–1	2–2	3–1	4–0	3–1	3–0	—	4–2	0–2	2–2	1–1	3–3	7–1	3–3	3–1	2–0
Eintracht Frankfurt	2–2	1–0	4–2	3–1	2–1	2–0	3–1	1–0	3–2	—	0–0	2–2	1–4	2–0	2–1	2–0	3–1	1–2
Hamburger SV	4–1	3–1	1–1	2–0	2–2	2–1	5–0	3–0	2–1	4–0	—	3–0	6–0	3–0	1–2	4–1	4–2	1–1
1. FC Kaiserslautern	3–0	3–2	1–1	2–1	4–0	2–0	3–1	2–1	3–0	2–1	2–1	—	1–1	1–3	2–1	3–0	2–2	5–1
1. FC Köln	3–1	2–1	1–1	3–1	2–0	2–1	5–0	3–3	2–2	0–2	1–3	2–2	—	1–1	1–1	2–0	1–0	1–2
Borussia Mönchengladbach	0–2	4–1	2–0	2–3	4–0	3–1	2–2	0–2	1–0	1–3	4–3	5–1	2–0	—	1–7	3–1	0–0	0–0
Bayern Munich	1–1	0–4	2–1	6–1	4–0	1–1	4–0	6–2	1–1	3–1	0–1	1–0	5–1	3–1	—	4–0	2–1	1–1
1. FC Nürnberg	2–1	0–1	0–2	0–3	2–2	3–2	2–2	2–1	3–2	0–0	3–3	0–0	1–1	1–0	4–2	—	0–2	1–0
Schalke 04	1–1	4–1	1–3	4–4	2–1	4–2	5–1	2–1	1–2	4–0	1–3	1–1	1–1	1–1	2–1	0–0	—	2–3
VfB Stuttgart	3–0	5–1	2–0	3–0	1–1	3–0	1–1	2–0	5–0	3–1	1–0	3–0	1–4	2–0	2–0	4–0	4–0	—

Source: DFB
Legend: Blue = home team win; Yellow = draw; Red = away team win.

== Top goalscorers ==
22 goals

- (Germany) Klaus Allofs (Fortuna Düsseldorf)

21 goals

- (Germany) Klaus Fischer (FC Schalke 04)

18 goals

- (Germany) Rüdiger Abramczik (FC Schalke 04)

17 goals

- (England) Kevin Keegan (Hamburger SV)
- (Germany) Klaus Toppmöller (1. FC Kaiserslautern)

16 goals

- (Germany) Dieter Hoeneß (VfB Stuttgart)
- (Germany) Harald Nickel (Eintracht Braunschweig)

15 goals

- (Germany) Manfred Burgsmüller (Borussia Dortmund)

14 goals

- (Germany) Karl-Heinz Rummenigge (FC Bayern Munich)
- (Germany) Georg Volkert (VfB Stuttgart)

== Champion squad ==
Hamburger SV
Goalkeeper: Rudi Kargus (34).

Defenders: Manfred Kaltz (34 / 6); Peter Nogly (captain; 34 / 1); Ivan Buljan (Socialist Federal Republic of Yugoslavia) (32 / 5); Peter Hidien (31 / 3); Hans-Jürgen Ripp (8); Uwe Beginski (1).
Midfielders: Kevin Keegan (England) (34 / 17); Jimmy Hartwig (34 / 10); Caspar Memering (34 / 4); Horst Bertl (24 / 5); Felix Magath (captain; 21 / 4).
Forwards: Horst Hrubesch (34 / 13); Willi Reimann (26 / 5); Bernd Wehmeyer (19 / 2); Hans-Günther Plücken (7 / 1).
(league appearances and goals listed in brackets)

Manager: Branko Zebec (Socialist Federal Republic of Yugoslavia) .

On the roster but did not play in a league game: Jürgen Stars; Bernd Gorski; Andreas Karow; Thomas Bliemeister.

== See also ==
- 1978–79 DFB-Pokal
