= Uwe Beginski =

German footballer (1959–2025)

Personal information
- Date of birth: 13 December 1959
- Place of birth: West Germany
- Date of death: 16 January 2025 (aged 65)
- Height: 1.83 m (6 ft 0 in)
- Position: Defender

Senior career*
Years	Team	Apps	(Gls)
1978–1980	Hamburger SV	2	(0)
1980–1982	SV Darmstadt 98	82	(1)
1983	VfL Osnabrück	17	(0)
1983–1985	KSV Hessen Kassel	42	(0)
- * Club domestic league appearances and goals

Uwe Beginski (13 December 1959 – 16 January 2025) was a German football player. He spent three seasons in the Bundesliga with Hamburger SV and SV Darmstadt 98.

== Honours ==
- European Cup finalist: 1979–80
- Bundesliga champion: 1978–79
- Bundesliga runner-up: 1979–80
