= Vladimir Kovačić =

Croatian footballer (born 1950)

Personal information
- Full name: Vladimir Kovačić
- Date of birth: 6 March 1950
- Place of birth: Zagreb, Croatia, Yugoslavia
- Position: Goalkeeper

Senior career*
Years	Team	Apps	(Gls)
1967–1974	Dinamo Zagreb		
1974–1977	Hamburger SV	6	(0)
1977–1980	Wuppertaler SV	94	(0)
- * Club domestic league appearances and goals

Vladimir Kovačić (born 6 March 1950) is a retired Croatian footballer. He primarily played for Dinamo Zagreb within the Yugoslav First League as well as for Hamburger SV and Wuppertaler SV within the Bundesliga and 2. Bundesliga throughout the 1970s.

== Career ==
Kovačić began his senior career at Dinamo Zagreb in the 1967–68 Yugoslav First League. However, he was overshadowed by Bosnian goalkeeper Fahrija Dautbegović for a long time whom he only had to replace occasionally as Dautbegović was firmly within the Starting XI of the club. Throughout his time in Croatia, he was also goalkeeper of NK Zagreb at some point. In 1974, he moved to the Bundesliga to play for Hamburger SV to act as second goalkeeper behind Rudi Kargus, becoming the first Croatian to play for the club. After making his debut in the top flight of German football for the 1974–75 season in the 4–0 away win against Wuppertaler SV in April 1975, he had to wait until January 1977 in a 4–4 draw against Borussia Dortmund before he was allowed to play again for when Kargus was injured, only making six appearances in total. As a substitute, he supported the team in their victory at the 1975–76 DFB-Pokal and at the following 1976–77 European Cup Winners' Cup which saw career highs for the club. Notably, during the 1976–77 season, on 5 February 1977, he was the goalkeeper in a 5–3 thrashing against Rot-Weiss Essen that would lead to their relegation that season.

In 1977, Kovačić accepted an offer from Wuppertaler SV, which had been relegated to the 2. Bundesliga since 1974. Within the club, he replaced Fritz Stefens within the Starting XI and established himself as the regular goalkeeper. After narrowly missing out on promotion last year as third in the table, he only achieved a midfield place in the North Division with the team centering around Bernhard Hermes, Helmut Lausen and Günter Pröpper. As a result, the club slipped further, and at the end of the 1979–80 season, Die Löwen were relegated to the Oberliga West as the bottom of the table with Kovačić retiring from the club.
