= Phil Thompson =

English footballer and manager (born 1954)

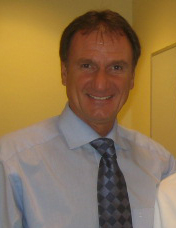

Personal information
- Full name: Philip Bernard Thompson
- Date of birth: 21 January 1954 (age 72)
- Place of birth: Kirkby, Lancashire, England
- Height: 1.83 m (6 ft 0 in)
- Position: Centre back

Senior career*
Years	Team	Apps	(Gls)
1971–1984	Liverpool	340	(7)
1984–1986	Sheffield United	37	(0)
Total		377	(7)

International career
1972	England Youth	7	(2)
1975–1976	England U-23	2	(0)
1978	England B	2	(0)
1976–1982	England	42	(1)

Managerial career
- 2001–2002: Liverpool (caretaker)
- * Club domestic league appearances and goals

Philip Bernard Thompson (born 21 January 1954) is an English retired footballer, who played as a defender for Liverpool in the 1970s and 1980s. During this time, he made 42 appearances for the England national football team, and captained England on six occasions. After retiring as a player, he later served Liverpool as assistant manager and, during the 2001–02 season, acted as caretaker for six months while manager Gérard Houllier was ill.

Thompson was a Sky Sports pundit on Soccer Saturday for 22 years until August 2020, and is a regular Visiting Fellow at the University of Liverpool.

== Club career ==
=== Liverpool ===
Thompson was born in Kirkby, Lancashire, and was a Liverpool supporter, who stood on The Kop as a boy. His dreams came true when he signed as a professional for the club on 22 January 1971, the day after his 17th birthday.

He made his first team debut the following year against rivals Manchester United at Old Trafford. With Liverpool 2–0 up in the 81st minute Shankly took off John Toshack, replacing him with the 18-year-old defender. The move was intended to tighten up the defence and keep a clean-sheet, but three minutes later, Emlyn Hughes scored a goal for Liverpool. In 1973, Liverpool won a double haul of trophies—the League championship and UEFA Cup and Thompson played a role in both successes earning league and UEFA Cup medals in the process. The next season led to him displacing Larry Lloyd from the side altogether and pushed Tommy Smith across to full back, and he settled into a defensive partnership with club captain Hughes.

Thompson man-marked Malcolm Macdonald out of the game as Liverpool defeated Newcastle United 3–0 in the 1974 FA Cup Final. Thompson remained a major part of the team which, again, won the League and UEFA Cup double in 1976.

Liverpool's most productive season followed in 1977. Although Thompson played enough games to guarantee a medal when Liverpool retained the title, he suffered an injury which denied him a role in the exciting charge towards a unique treble, as Liverpool reached the finals of both the FA Cup and European Cup. The veteran Smith took Thompson's place; while Liverpool lost the 1977 FA Cup Final to Manchester United, they won their first European Cup a few days later in Rome by defeating Borussia Mönchengladbach (with Smith scoring Liverpool's second goal).

Thompson recovered from his injury and returned to the defence the following season, scoring a goal in Liverpool's victory over Hamburg in the 1977 UEFA Super Cup final. Liverpool reached their first League Cup final at Wembley and after a goalless draw against Nottingham Forest, the game went to a replay. It was a disappointing evening for Thompson, who committed the foul on Forest midfielder John O'Hare that led to the penalty that won the game for Brian Clough's team. Replays appeared to show that the foul took place outside the penalty area. Liverpool also surrendered the League title to Forest, but retained the European Cup with a win over FC Bruges, a game in which Thompson this time played.

Thompson was accompanied by a new central defensive partner in Alan Hansen as Liverpool regained the title in 1979. When Hughes left the club for Wolves late in 1979, Thompson was appointed as captain, winning the League in 1980. He continued to play frequently for England and was in the squad which qualified for the 1980 European Championships, though England's performances in Italy were disappointing.

Thompson's proudest moment as Liverpool skipper came in 1981 when he lifted the European Cup after a 1–0 victory over Real Madrid in the Paris final—the club's third success in the competition. Thompson also stepped up to receive the League Cup after a replay win against West Ham United, the club's first of four consecutive successes in the competition.

Bob Paisley upset Thompson the following season when he decided to hand the captaincy to Graeme Souness. At the time the season had not started well and Thompson's own form had dipped. However, Thompson continued to play regularly in defence, winning further title medals in 1982 and 1983. He was in the team which retained the League Cup in 1982, but missed the victory in the 1983 final due to injury.

From 1984, Thompson's opportunities as a Liverpool player were diminishing, with Hansen now being paired with the younger Mark Lawrenson. Liverpool won the title, League Cup and European Cup in this year, but Thompson did not qualify for a medal in any of these successes.

=== Sheffield United ===
In 1985, he was offered the manager's job at Swindon Town but turned it down as he wanted to concentrate on playing. He was sold to Sheffield United but could not settle, so he quit playing at the comparatively early age of 31 and was recruited by new Liverpool boss Kenny Dalglish as a coach.

== International career ==
Thompson played 42 matches for England between 1976 and 1982, the 22-year-old's debut coming on 24 March in a 2–1 win over Wales in a friendly at the Racecourse Ground at Wrexham. During a summer mini-tournament held in the United States on 28 May 1976, Thompson scored his one and only goal for England in a friendly match against Italy in New York.

== Off-the-field return to Liverpool ==
He was with the club in this role for four years, progressing to being Kenny Dalglish's assistant as the team (now captained by Alan Hansen) won the League in 1988 and 1990 and the FA Cup in 1989. Thompson was working at the club at the time of the Hillsborough disaster, on 15 April 1989 at the beginning of the FA Cup semi-final against Nottingham Forest. The tragedy claimed 94 lives on the day, with the final death toll reaching 97. Liverpool won the 1989 FA Cup Final against Merseyside rivals Everton.

When Graeme Souness, the man who replaced Thompson as captain, came back to the club as Dalglish's replacement in early 1991, Thompson was kept on. Thompson was dismissed by Souness in 1992 for allegedly talking to Manchester United's Alex Ferguson and his assistant about issues at the club involving Souness. Word had got back to Souness via his connections at Rangers. It was agreed by both the club and Thompson that details of what happened would not be disclosed.

It was alleged that Souness believed Thompson was interested in his job as manager while Souness recovered from bypass surgery in the spring of 1992.

In late 1993, Thompson was widely linked with the manager vacancy at Nagoya Grampus Eight.

He earned a living through speaking and punditry until Gérard Houllier became Liverpool manager in 1998 and, following the departure of Roy Evans, Houllier asked Thompson to return to the club as assistant manager, which Thompson accepted. This second stint was eventful – a spat between Thompson and striker Robbie Fowler led to restricted appearances for the centre forward and his eventual departure to Leeds United; and Thompson spent several months in sole charge of the team (with some success) when Houllier underwent emergency heart surgery in October 2001.

During his time as assistant manager of Liverpool, the club completed a unique 'treble' of UEFA Cup, FA Cup and League Cup in 2001. When Houllier was relieved of his duties in 2004, Thompson also left the club.

In September 2010, Gérard Houllier was appointed manager of Aston Villa and this led to Houllier offering him the role of assistant manager at the Midlands club. However, Thompson rejected the offer as he felt he could not commit himself to the role due to the long journey to work, the inevitably large number of scouting missions and his unwillingness to uproot his family or live away from them.

== Career statistics ==
=== Club ===
Appearances and goals by club, season and competition
Club	Season	League			FA Cup		League Cup		Continental		Other		Total	
Club	Season	Division	Apps	Goals	Apps	Goals	Apps	Goals	Apps	Goals	Apps	Goals	Apps	Goals
Liverpool	1971–72	First Division	1	0	0	0	0	0	0	0	—		1	0
Liverpool	1972–73	First Division	14	0	2	0	1	0	3	0	—		20	0
Liverpool	1973–74	First Division	35	2	9	0	4	0	3	0	—		51	2
Liverpool	1974–75	First Division	32	0	2	0	1	0	1	2	1	0	37	2
Liverpool	1975–76	First Division	41	0	2	0	3	0	11	2	—		57	2
Liverpool	1976–77	First Division	26	2	4	0	2	0	3	0	1	0	36	2
Liverpool	1977–78	First Division	27	3	1	0	7	0	7	1	1	0	43	4
Liverpool	1978–79	First Division	39	0	6	0	1	0	3	0	—		49	0
Liverpool	1979–80	First Division	42	0	8	0	7	1	2	0	1	0	60	1
Liverpool	1980–81	First Division	25	0	1	0	6	0	7	0	1	0	40	0
Liverpool	1981–82	First Division	34	0	1	0	7	0	5	0	1	0	48	0
Liverpool	1982–83	First Division	24	0	0	0	4	0	5	0	1	0	34	0
Liverpool	1983–84	First Division	0	0	0	0	0	0	0	0	1	0	1	0
Liverpool	Total		340	7	36	0	43	1	50	5	8	0	477	13
Sheffield United	1984–85	Second Division	10	0	1	0	0	0	—		—		11	0
Sheffield United	1985–86	Second Division	27	0	2	0	4	0	—		1	0	34	0
Sheffield United	Total		37	0	3	0	4	0	—		1	0	45	0
Career total			377	7	39	0	47	1	50	5	8	0	522	13

=== International ===
Appearances and goals by national team and year
National team	Year	Apps	Goals
England	1976	8	1
England	1977	0	0
England	1978	2	0
England	1979	8	0
England	1980	10	0
England	1981	3	0
England	1982	11	0
Total		42	1

== Honours ==
=== As a player ===
Liverpool

- Football League First Division: 1972–73, 1975–76, 1976–77, 1978–79, 1979–80, 1981–82, 1982–83
- FA Cup: 1973–74
- Football League Cup: 1980–81, 1981–82, 1982–83; runner-up: 1977–78
- FA Charity Shield: 1974, 1976, 1977, 1979, 1980, 1982
- European Cup: 1976–77, 1977–78, 1980–81
- UEFA Cup: 1972–73, 1975–76
- European Super Cup: 1977

=== As a manager ===
Individual

- Premier League Manager of the Month: November 2001, March 2002

Sporting positions
Preceded by Emlyn Hughes	Liverpool captain 1979-1981	Succeeded by Graeme Souness
