= TSV Abbehausen =

German football club

TSV Abbehausen 1861
- Full name: Turn- und Sportverein Abbehausen 1861
- Founded: 1861
- League: Bezirksliga Weser/Ems 2 (VII)
- 2017–18: 5th
- Website: http://tsvabbehausen.de/
Home colours	Away colours

TSV Abbehausen is a German association football club from Abbehausen in the city of Nordenham, Lower Saxony.

== History ==
The club was established in 1861 as the men's gymnastics club Männerturnverein Abbehausen. After World War II it was reestablished under the name Turn- und Sportverein Abbehausen 1861.

Today TSV is a multi sport club with departments for badminton, beach volleyball, fistball, swimming, gymnastics, and other recreational activities. The football section was not established until 1950.

The footballers' most notable achievement was an appearance in the opening round of the 1975–76 DFB-Pokal (German Cup) where they were put out 0:5 by SV Union Salzgitter.
