= António Garrido (referee) =

Portuguese football referee

- Born: António José da Silva Garrido; 3 December 1932; Vieira de Leiria, Marinha Grande, Portugal
- Died: 10 September 2014 (aged 81)
- Occupation: Accountant
- Known for: Football referee (1964–1982)

António José da Silva Garrido OIH (3 December 1932 – 10 September 2014) was a Portuguese football referee.

== Career ==
Born in Vieira de Leiria, Marinha Grande, Garrido was the first Portuguese referee to officiate a European Cup final in 1980. He refereed three matches in the FIFA World Cup, two in the 1978 and one in the 1982 – the match for third place. He also refereed one match in the UEFA Euro 1980 and the first leg of 1977 European Super Cup.

On 3 August 1983, Garrido received the title of Officer of the Order of Prince Henry. Although he was an accountant by profession, he continued involved in football after his forced retirement as a referee in 1982 due to age limit. He then had several positions, becoming member of the FPF's Refereeing Board (for 4 years), FIFA referee instructor, UEFA observer, and referees commissioner in World Cups (for 20 years).

In 2005, Garrido was heard as a witness in Portuguese corruption scandal Apito Dourado (Golden Whistle) for being tapped talking to Pinto de Sousa (Chairman of the FPF's Refereeing Board) and Valentim Loureiro (Chairman of the Portuguese League for Professional Football).

=== 1978 World Cup ===
Garrido officiated the match between the hosts Argentina and Hungary.

=== UEFA Euro 1980 ===
Garrido also officiated the match between Italy and Belgium at UEFA Euro 1980.

== Personal life and death ==
In 2012, Garrido admitted to have become a supporter of FC Porto, despite being himself a declared supporter of Sporting CP before ending his referee career. He was accused of collaborating with the former club, a claim which he denied.

On 10 September 2014, he died after a long illness.

| Preceded by European Cup Final 1979 (Austria) Erich Linemayr | European Cup Referees; Final 1980 (Portugal) António Garrido | Succeeded by European Cup Final 1981 (Hungary) Károly Palotai |
