= Kuno Klötzer =

German football manager (1922–2011)

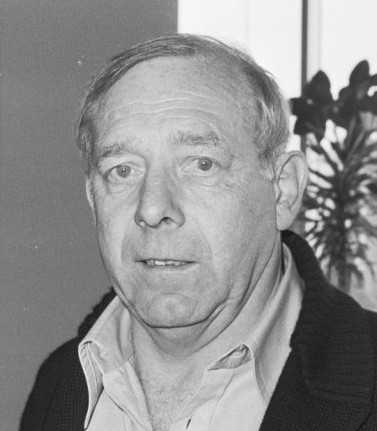
- Klötzer in 1977

Personal information
- Date of birth: 19 April 1922
- Place of birth: Geyer, Germany
- Date of death: 6 August 2011 (aged 89)
- Place of death: Norderstedt, Germany
- Position: Midfielder

Senior career*
Years	Team	Apps	(Gls)
1946–1949	Helmstedter SV		
1949–1952	Werder Bremen	29	(2)

Managerial career
- 1953–1957: Fortuna Düsseldorf
- 1957–1958: Hannover 96
- 1958–1961: Preußen Münster
- 1961–1963: Schwarz-Weiß Essen
- 1963–1967: Fortuna Düsseldorf
- 1967–1968: Wuppertaler SV
- 1968–1969: Rot-Weiss Essen
- 1969–1970: 1. FC Nürnberg
- 1970–1972: Kickers Offenbach
- 1973–1977: Hamburger SV
- 1977–1980: Hertha BSC
- 1980–1981: Werder Bremen
- 1981–1982: MSV Duisburg
- * Club domestic league appearances and goals

Kuno Klötzer (19 April 1922 – 6 August 2011) was a German football player and coach who won the 1977 UEFA Cup Winners' Cup managing Hamburger SV.

Born in Geyer, Germany, Klötzer managed several clubs included Arminia Hannover, Hannover 96, Fortuna Düsseldorf (with Matthias Mauritz, Toni Turek, the "football god" and world champion of 1954, and Erich Juskowiak among his team), 1. FC Nürnberg, Kickers Offenbach, Hamburger SV, Hertha BSC, MSV Duisburg and Werder Bremen. His Hamburg side won the UEFA Cup Winners' Cup with a 2–0 victory over R.S.C. Anderlecht on 11 May 1977 at Olympisch Stadion, Amsterdam.

== Honours ==
Fortuna Düsseldorf

- Regionalliga West: 1965–66
- Intertoto Cup: 1967

Kickers Offenbach

- Regionalliga Süd: 1971–72

Hamburger SV

- DFB-Pokal: 1975–76
- European Cup Winners' Cup: 1976–77

Werder Bremen

- 2. Bundesliga: 1980–81
