= Willi Reimann =

German football player and manager (born 1949)

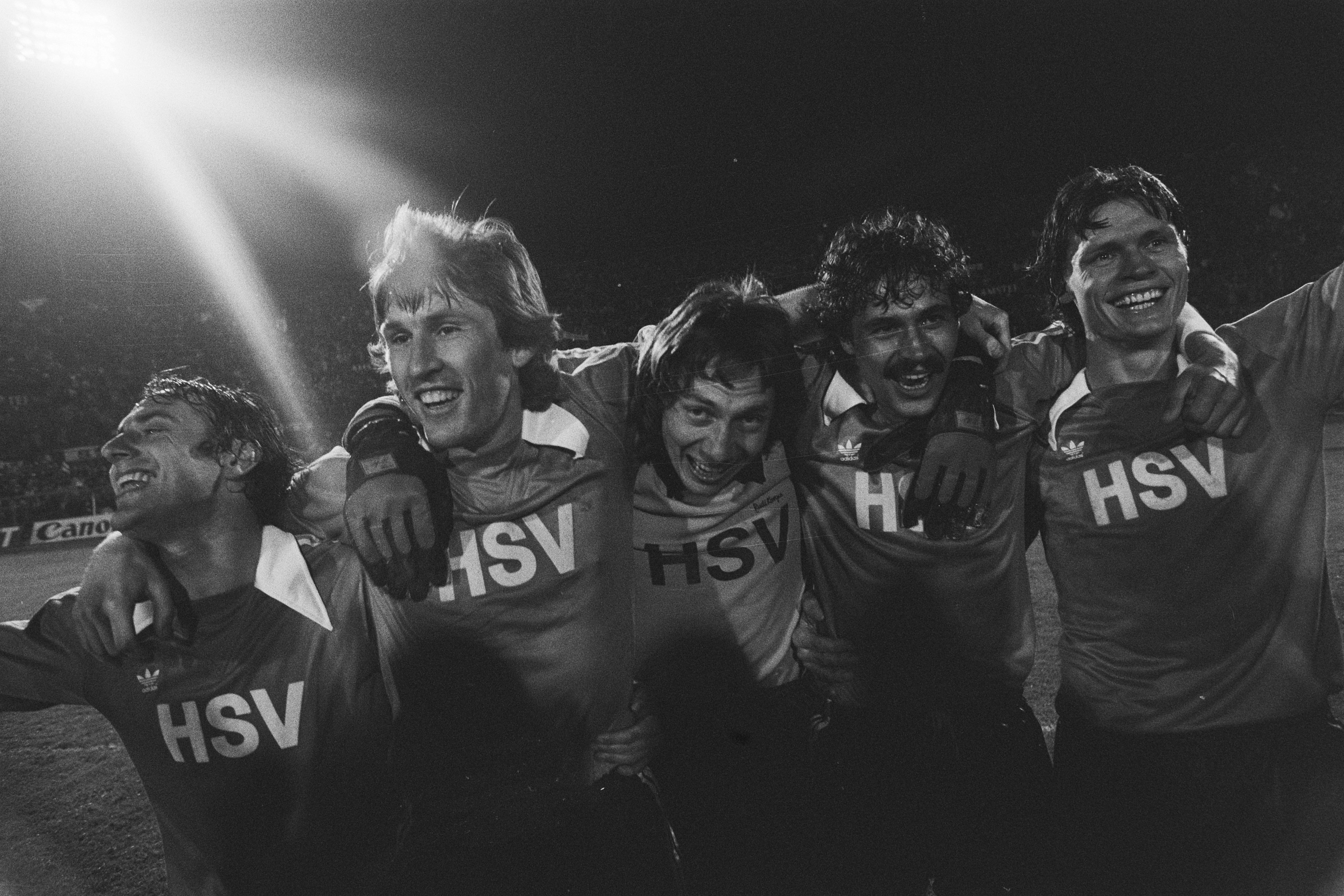
- Willi Reimann (first from left) in 1977

Personal information
- Date of birth: 24 December 1949 (age 76)
- Place of birth: Fürstenau, West Germany
- Position: Striker

Youth career
- VfB Rheine

Senior career*
Years	Team	Apps	(Gls)
1968–1970	TuS Bremerhaven 93	51	(26)
1970–1974	Hannover 96	112	(44)
1974–1981	Hamburger SV	175	(49)
1981	Calgary Boomers	17	(8)
Total		304	(101)

Managerial career
- 1982–1986: Altona 93
- 1986–1987: FC St. Pauli
- 1987–1990: Hamburger SV
- 1994–1995: SV Lurup
- 1996–1998: VfL Wolfsburg
- 1998: 1. FC Nürnberg
- 1999–2000: FC St. Pauli
- 2002–2004: Eintracht Frankfurt
- 2005: Al-Shaab
- 2006–2007: Eintracht Braunschweig
- * Club domestic league appearances and goals

Willi Reimann (born 24 December 1949) is a German former football player and manager.

Reimann played as a young boy in a local club in Rheine, later in the Bundesliga for Hannover 96 and Hamburg, appearing in 287 games, in which he scored 93 goals. After one more season for the Calgary Boomers in the North American Soccer League in 1981, Reimann retired from playing.

As manager he worked for FC St. Pauli, HSV, VfL Wolfsburg, 1. FC Nürnberg and Eintracht Frankfurt.

After being sacked due to the relegation of Frankfurt he moved to the United Arab Emirates to manage Al-Shaab. From November 2006 until March 2007, he managed Eintracht Braunschweig.

== Honours ==
Hamburger SV

- Bundesliga: 1978–79
- DFB-Pokal: 1975–76
- European Cup: runner-up 1979–80
- UEFA Cup Winners' Cup: 1976–77
