= Klaus Zaczyk =

German footballer

Personal information
- Date of birth: 25 May 1945 (age 81)
- Height: 1.74 m (5 ft 9 in)
- Positions: Midfielder; striker

Senior career*
Years	Team	Apps	(Gls)
1963–1968	Karlsruher SC	104	(11)
1968–1969	1. FC Nürnberg		
1969–1978	Hamburger SV	262	(47)
1980–1982	KSV Hessen Kassel	127	(16)

International career
1967	West Germany	1	(1)
- * Club domestic league appearances and goals

Klaus Zaczyk (born 25 May 1945) is a former international German football player.

He appeared in 400 matches in the Bundesliga. Zaczyk played his only game for West Germany on 22 February 1967, scoring a goal in a 5–1 friendly win against Morocco.

== Honours ==
Hamburger SV

- UEFA Cup Winners' Cup: 1976–77
- DFB-Pokal: 1975–76
