= Peter Hidien =

German footballer

Personal information
- Date of birth: 14 November 1953 (age 72)
- Place of birth: Koblenz, West Germany
- Height: 1.78 m (5 ft 10 in)
- Position: Defender

Senior career*
Years	Team	Apps	(Gls)
1972–1982	Hamburger SV	214	(9)
- SV Hummelsbüttel
- VfL Pinneberg
- * Club domestic league appearances and goals

Peter Hidien (born 14 November 1953) is a German former professional footballer who played as a defender. He spent ten seasons in the Bundesliga with Hamburger SV.

== Honours ==
Hamburger SV

- Bundesliga: 1978–79, 1981–82
- DFB-Pokal: 1975–76; runner-up: 1973–74
- European Cup Winners' Cup: 1976–77
- European Cup runner-up: 1979–80
- UEFA Cup runner-up: 1981–82
