= Georg Volkert =

German footballer (1945–2020)

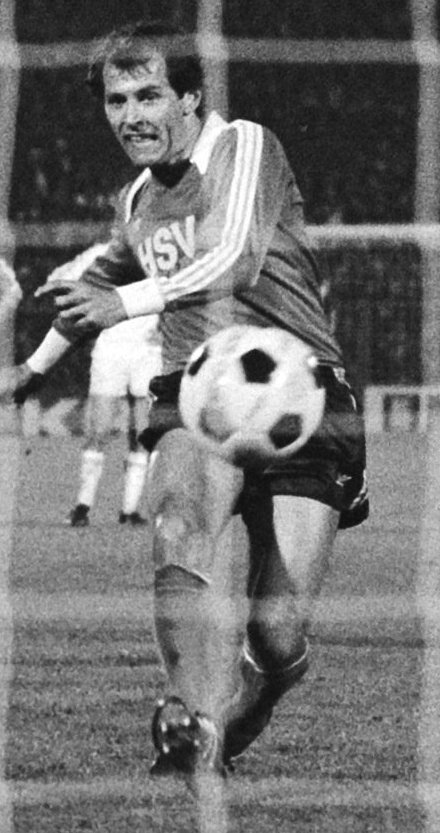
- Volkert in 1977

Personal information
- Date of birth: 28 November 1945
- Place of birth: Ansbach, Germany
- Date of death: 16 August 2020 (aged 74)
- Place of death: Erlangen, Germany
- Height: 1.78 m (5 ft 10 in)
- Position: Striker

Senior career*
Years	Team	Apps	(Gls)
1965–1969	1. FC Nürnberg	105	(27)
1969–1971	FC Zürich	52	(15)
1971–1978	Hamburger SV	214	(62)
1978–1980	VfB Stuttgart	60	(26)
1980–1981	1. FC Nürnberg	31	(10)
Total		462	(140)

International career
1968–1977	West Germany	12	(2)
- * Club domestic league appearances and goals

Georg "Schorsch" Volkert (28 November 1945 – 16 August 2020) was a German professional footballer. He played in 410 games in Bundesliga and scored 125 goals. He was also under contract in Switzerland, playing for FC Zürich.

A forward, Volkert won 12 caps for West Germany between 1968 and 1977. He scored two goals in his debut.

Volkert began playing club football with local side SpVgg Ansbach. In 1963, he was transferred to Bundesliga side 1. FC Nürnberg, where Volkert formed an effective attacking trio with Zvezdan Čebinac and Franz Brungs. Volkert helped Nurnberg win the 1967–68 Bundesliga.

== Honours ==
1. FC Nürnberg

- Bundesliga: 1967–68

Hamburger SV

- UEFA Cup Winners' Cup: 1976–77
- DFB-Pokal: 1975–76
