= Ferdinand Keller (footballer) =

German footballer (1946–2023)

Personal information
- Date of birth: 30 July 1946
- Place of birth: Pasing, Munich, Bavaria, Germany
- Date of death: 11 December 2023 (aged 77)
- Position: Forward

Senior career*
Years	Team	Apps	(Gls)
1969–1970	1860 Munich	24	(2)
1970–1972	Hannover 96	61	(39)
1972–1976	1860 Munich	60	(46)
1976–1978	Hamburger SV	40	(16)
1978–1979	Borussia Neunkirchen	22	(6)
Total		207	(109)

International career
1975	West Germany	1	(0)
- * Club domestic league appearances and goals

Ferdinand Keller (30 July 1946 – 11 December 2023) was a German professional footballer who played as a forward. He spent five seasons in the Bundesliga with 1860 Munich, Hannover 96 and Hamburger SV. He represented West Germany once, in a friendly against Austria. Keller died on 11 December 2023, at the age of 77.

== Honours ==
Hamburger SV

- UEFA Cup Winners' Cup: 1976–77
