= Peter Nogly =

German footballer (1947–2026)

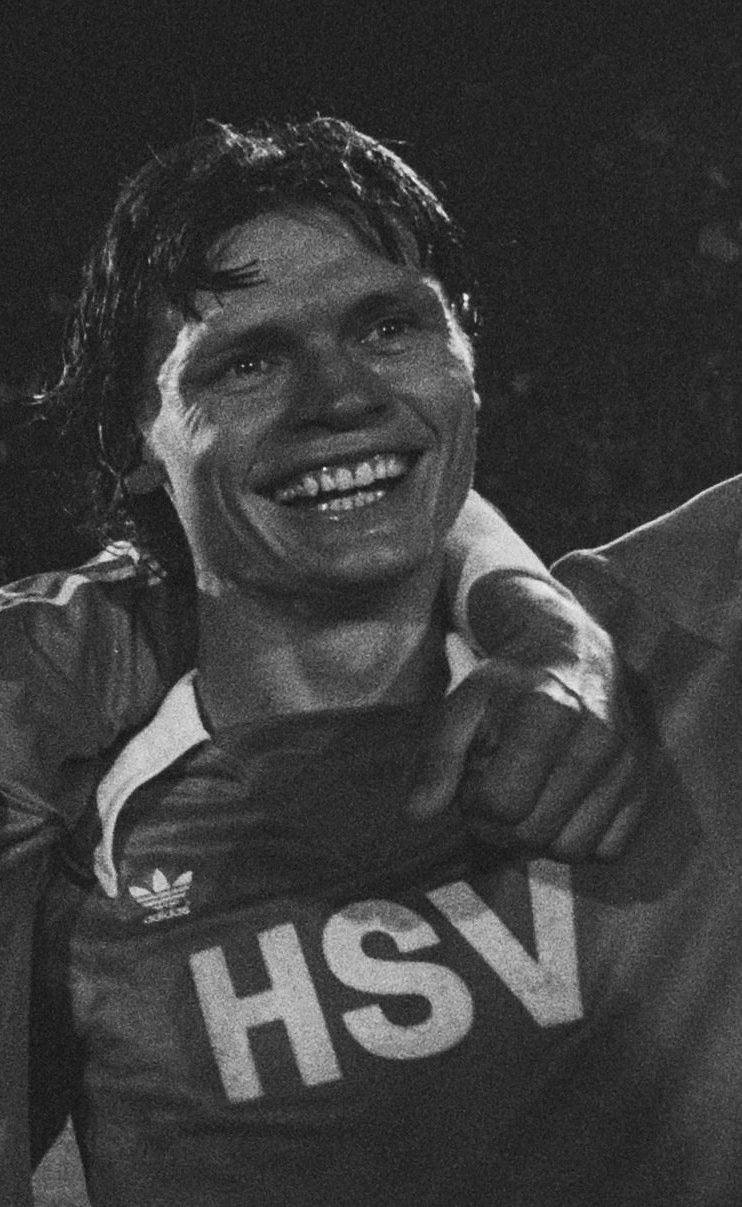
- Nogly in 1977

Personal information
- Date of birth: 14 January 1947
- Place of birth: Travemünde, Schleswig-Holstein, Allied-occupied Germany
- Date of death: 24 September 2026 (aged 79)
- Height: 1.82 m (6 ft 0 in)
- Positions: Defender; midfielder

Youth career
- TSV Travemünde
- Eichholzer SV

Senior career*
Years	Team	Apps	(Gls)
1967–1969	1. FC Phönix Lübeck	62	(22)
1969–1980	Hamburger SV	320	(38)
1980–1981	Edmonton Drillers	49	(16)
1982–1983	Tampa Bay Rowdies	56	(8)
1983	Tampa Bay Rowdies (indoor)		
1983–1984	Hertha BSC	18	(2)
1984–1985	FC St. Pauli	20	(2)
1986–1989	VfB Lübeck	1	(0)

International career
1977	West Germany	4	(0)

Managerial career
- 1986–1989: VfB Lübeck
- 1989–1991: Eutin 08
- SC Wentorf
- 1. FC Phönix Lübeck
- TuS Hoisdorf
- SC Victoria Hamburg
- 2001–2002: Eintracht Norderstedt
- 2004–2005: FC St. Georg Hamburg
- 2005: Al-Shaab (assistant)
- 2006–2007: VfL 93 Hamburg
- 2008–2010: Wedeler TSV
- 2011: Hamm United FC
- * Club domestic league appearances and goals

Peter Nogly (14 January 1947 – 24 September 2026) was a German football player and coach.

== Club career ==
He participated in all his 320 Bundesliga matches in his Hamburger SV shirt. He was captain of the team for a long time and scored the first goal in the 1976 DFB-Pokal final in a 2–0 win against 1. FC Kaiserslautern. With Hamburger SV, he also won the 1976–77 European Cup Winners' Cup and the 1978–79 Bundesliga, however was on the losing side in the 1980 European Cup final against Nottingham Forest.

After the defeat, he moved to the North American Soccer League to play for the Edmonton Drillers and Tampa Bay Rowdies. He was a first team all-star selection in 1981 and 1982, and earned a place on the NASL's 2nd team in 1980. Nogly scored a goal in the finals of the 1983 indoor finals which Tampa Bay won 5–4.

He returned to West Germany in 1983 to play for Hertha BSC in the 2. Bundesliga and the following season he moved to FC St. Pauli for a year.

== International career ==
Nogly earned four caps for the West Germany national team in 1977. He was included in the West German team for the 1976 European Championships, but did not play.

== Death ==
Nogly died on 24 September 2026, at the age of 79.

== Honours ==
Hamburger SV

- Bundesliga: 1978–79
- DFB-Pokal: 1975–76; runner-up: 1973–74
- European Cup Winners' Cup: 1976–77
- European Cup runner-up: 1979–80

Tampa Bay Rowdies

- NASL indoor: 1983

West Germany

- European Championship runner-up: 1976

Individual

- NASL All-star first team: 1981, 1982
- NASL All-star second team: 1980
