= Caspar Memering =

German footballer (born 1953)

Personal information
- Date of birth: 1 June 1953 (age 73)
- Place of birth: Bockhorst, West Germany
- Height: 1.78 m (5 ft 10 in)
- Position: Midfielder

Youth career
- DJK Bockhorst
- Werder Bremen

Senior career*
Years	Team	Apps	(Gls)
1971–1982	Hamburger SV	303	(37)
1982–1984	Bordeaux	27	(2)
1984–1986	Schalke 04	17	(1)
Total		347	(40)

International career
1979–1980	West Germany	3	(0)

Managerial career
- 2006–2010: TuRa Westrhauderfehn
- 2010–2011: SV Bösel
Medal record
Representing West Germany
UEFA European Championship
Winner	1980 Italy
- * Club domestic league appearances and goals

Caspar Memering (born 1 June 1953) is a German former professional footballer who played as a midfielder.

== Club career ==
The player appeared in 320 West German top-flight matches.

== International career ==
He was part of the West Germany national team that won the 1980 UEFA European Championship. Memering won three caps.

== Honours ==
Hamburger SV

- Bundesliga: 1978–79, 1981–82
- DFB-Pokal: 1975–76
- UEFA Cup Winners' Cup: 1976–77
- European Cup: runner-up 1979–80
- UEFA Cup: runner-up 1981–82

West Germany

- UEFA European Championship: 1980
