= Manfred Kaltz =

German footballer and manager (born 1953)

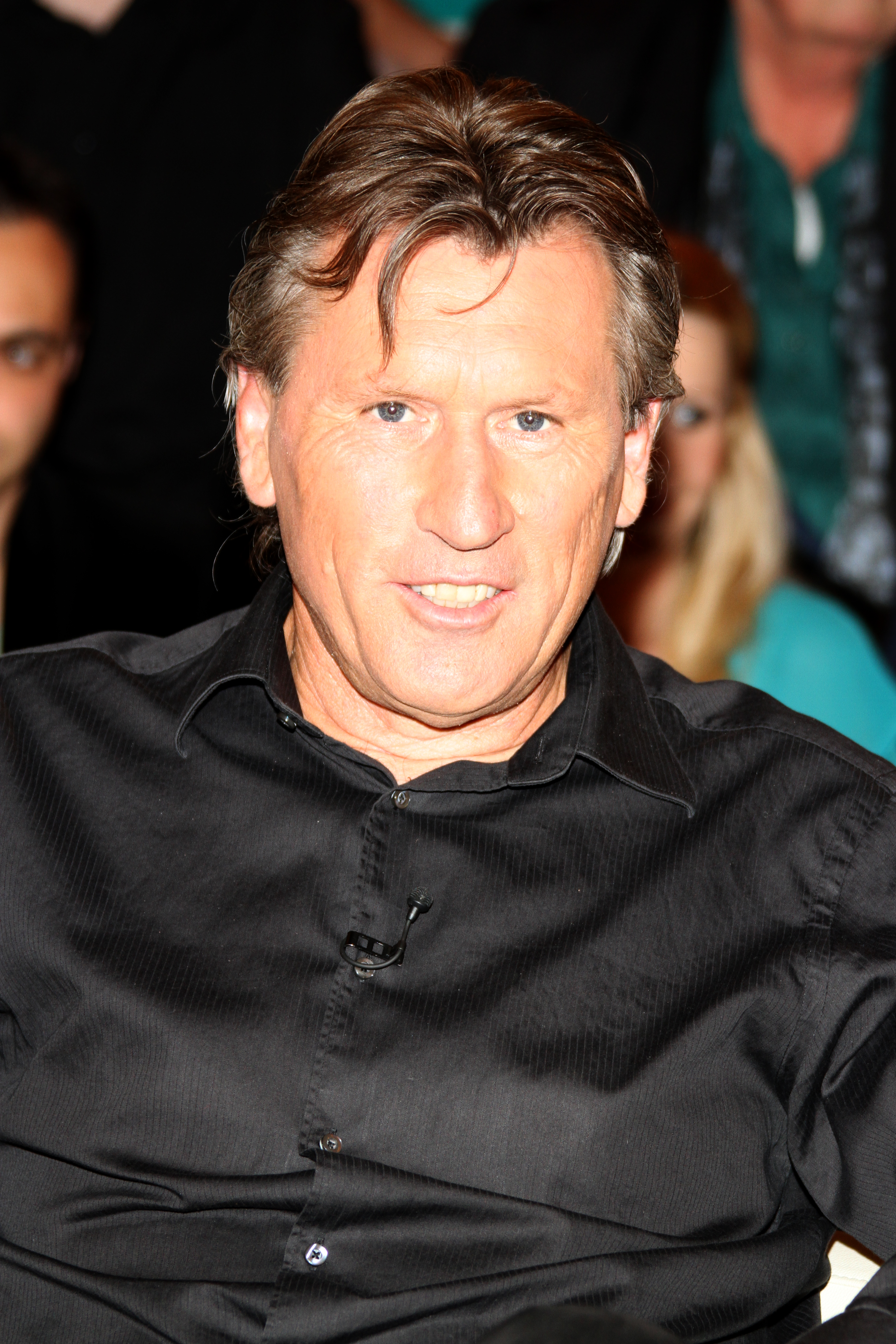
- Kaltz in 2012

Personal information
- Date of birth: 6 January 1953 (age 73)
- Place of birth: Ludwigshafen, West Germany
- Height: 1.86 m (6 ft 1 in)
- Position: Right-back

Youth career
- 1960–1968: VfL Neuhofen
- 1968–1970: TuS Altrip
- 1970–1971: Hamburger SV

Senior career*
Years	Team	Apps	(Gls)
1971–1989	Hamburger SV	568	(76)
1989	Girondins Bordeaux	1	(0)
1989–1990	Mulhouse	12	(1)
1990–1991	Hamburger SV	13	(0)
Total		594	(77)

International career
1972	West Germany Amateur	7	(0)
1972–1973	West Germany U-23	2	(0)
1974–1975	West Germany B	3	(0)
1975–1983	West Germany	69	(8)
Medal record
Representing West Germany
FIFA World Cup
Runner-up	1982 Spain
UEFA European Championship
Winner	1980 Italy
Runner-up	1976 Yugoslavia
- * Club domestic league appearances and goals

Manfred Kaltz (born 6 January 1953) is a German former football player and manager, who played as a right-back.

Kaltz played in the Bundesliga for Hamburger SV and 13 times (one goal) for FC Mulhouse in Ligue 1 after initially joining Mulhouse league rivals Girondins de Bordeaux in 1989. He returned to Hamburg the season after, the consequence of the relegation of FC Mulhouse from Ligue 1 at the end of 1989–90. Previously, Kaltz was forced to leave Hamburg, the club for which he had been a professional since the 1971–72 season, after the authorities (i.e. Erich Ribbeck) had decided not to go on with the contract of the long-serving full-back. Their successors lured him back from France in September 1990 to give him the chance to serve his final year as a player at his old club.

In total, he played in 581 Bundesliga games for Hamburger SV (HSV), to this day remaining the second greatest total of an individual in Bundesliga history. An expert in penalties, the Hamburg fan-favourite scored 53 of his 76 goals from the spot, a record in the Bundesliga. Internationally, he was part of the squad that won the 1980 UEFA European title.

Kaltz was famous for his right-footed crosses, which he hit with so much spin that they curved like a banana. They were affectionately called "Bananenflanken" ("banana crosses"). He often used this technique to set up hulking striker Horst Hrubesch, whose 96 goals with HSV included many from Kaltz crosses that Hrubesch headed into the opposing goal. Hrubesch once described their partnership when he explained one of his goals with the often quoted words "Manni banana, I head, goal".

== Honours ==
Hamburger SV

- Bundesliga: 1978–79, 1981–82, 1982–83
- DFB-Pokal: 1975–76, 1986–87
- DFB-Ligapokal: 1972–73
- European Cup: 1982–83
- UEFA Cup Winners' Cup: 1976–77

West Germany

- UEFA European Championship: 1980
- UEFA European Championship runner-up: 1976
- FIFA World Cup runner-up: 1982

Individual

- kicker Bundesliga Team of the Season: 1976–77, 1978–79, 1979–80, 1980–81, 1981–82, 1985–86
- Sport Ideal European XI: 1977, 1979, 1980
- Onze Mondial: 1980, 1981
- Guerin Sportivo All-Star Team: 1980, 1981
