= Rudi Kargus =

German footballer

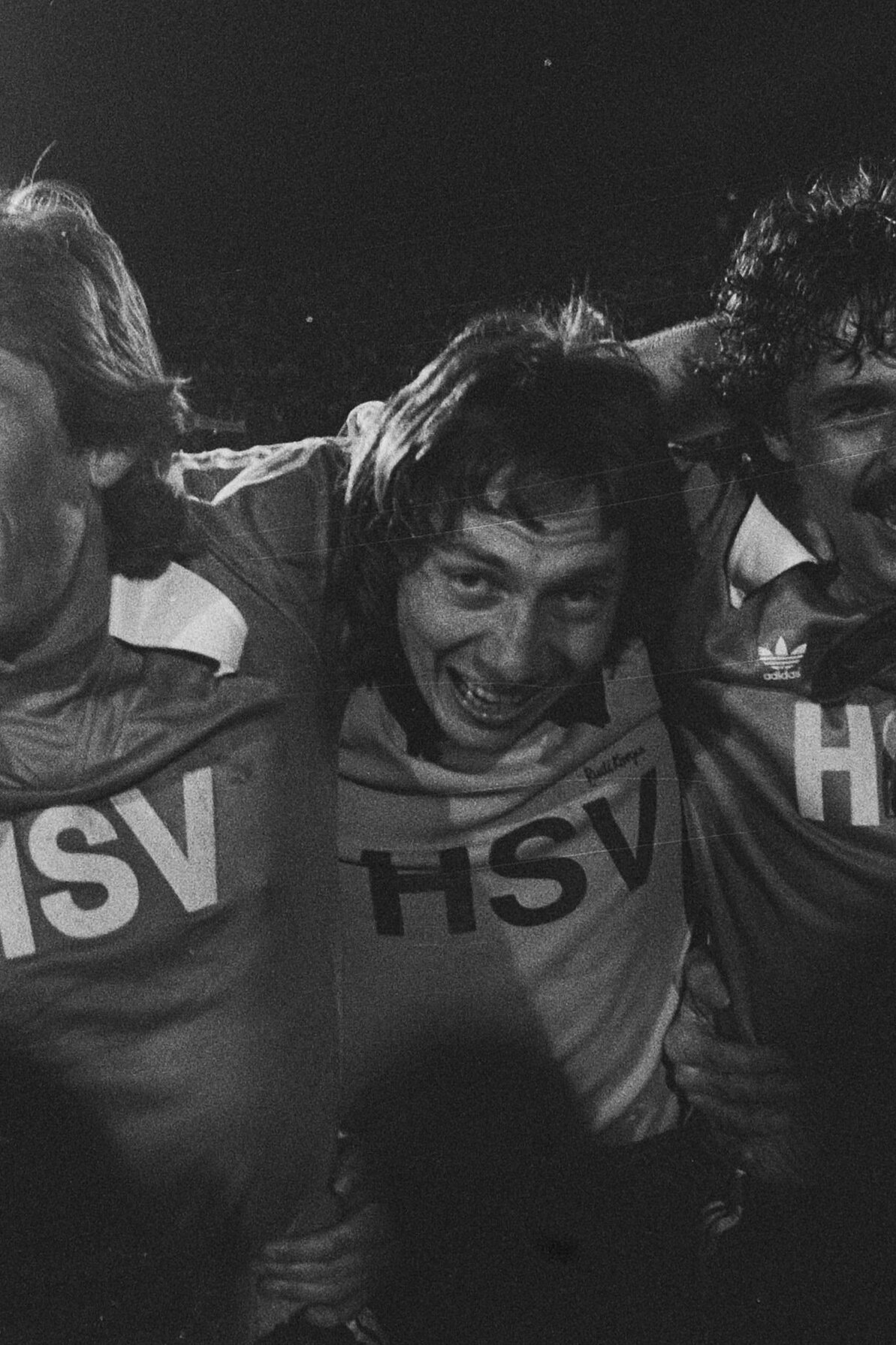
- Rudi Kargus in 1977

Personal information
- Full name: Rudolf Kargus
- Date of birth: 15 August 1952 (age 74)
- Place of birth: Worms, West Germany
- Height: 1.83 m (6 ft 0 in)
- Position: Goalkeeper

Youth career
- Wormatia Worms
- Hamburger SV

Senior career*
Years	Team	Apps	(Gls)
1971–1980	Hamburger SV	254	(0)
1980–1984	1. FC Nürnberg	141	(0)
1984–1986	Karlsruher SC	22	(0)
1986–1987	Fortuna Düsseldorf	20	(0)
1987–1990	1. FC Köln	0	(0)
Total		437	(0)

International career
1975–1977	West Germany	3	(0)

Managerial career
- 1991–1996: Hamburger SV (youth)
- 1998: USC Paloma
Medal record
Representing West Germany
UEFA European Championship
Runner-up	1976 Yugoslavia
- * Club domestic league appearances and goals

Rudolf "Rudi" Kargus (born 15 August 1952) is a German former professional footballer who played as a goalkeeper.

== Career ==
Born in Worms, West Germany, Kargus began playing football with boyhood club Wormatia Worms. Having joined the youth ranks of Hamburger SV in 1970, Kargus stepped up to become a Bundesliga goalkeeper for the North Germans from 1971, capturing the starting role in the goal of Hamburg in 1973. He served as the club's first-choice until Hamburg headed for a change on that position in 1980.

In his years with Hamburg he graduated into a goalkeeper as promising as reliable, known for his ability to save penalties (which earned him the Elfmetertöter nickname). He won the European Cup Winners' Cup with Hamburger SV in 1977, was runner-up with them in the European Cup in 1980 after winning the Bundesliga title the season before.

After the end of his deal with Hamburg in 1980 it took him four months to sign a new deal elsewhere, joining 1. FC Nürnberg. He was in the 1. FC Nürnberg team when Nuremberg was relegated to the 2. Bundesliga in 1984, going on for them in the lower division until Bundesliga side Karlsruher SC snapped him up in December 1984. He had tough luck in this change of clubs since Karlsruher SC could not avoid relegation to the 2. Bundesliga in the remainder of the season and, so, he had to return to playing games on that level in 1985–86.

For the campaign of 1986–87 he returned to the Bundesliga with a move to Fortuna Düsseldorf, but experienced another relegation from Bundesliga with them then. Following Düsseldorf's relegation the then well-travelled goalkeeper signed with another Bundesliga side, 1. FC Köln. However, in his three years with the side from Cologne he was just the veteran stand-in for Köln's young first-choice Bodo Illgner and did not manage to get any Bundesliga game for his final professional club. In total, Kargus played in 408 Bundesliga matches in his career and took part 19 times for his clubs in the 2nd Bundesliga.

His West Germany career had started early with youth internationals in his years with Wormatia Worms. His first senior cap was a product of Helmut Schön looking for Sepp Maier replacements and the good form of young Kargus for Hamburg in the Bundesliga. Four days prior to Christmas 1975 Kargus was chosen to represent West Germany in a friendly against Turkey. He did well and was subsequently named in the 1976 UEFA European Championship squad, serving as (the unused) deputy of Sepp Maier. A further friendly appearance later, Kargus came on also at half-time against Yugoslavia in 1977 to replace Maier. That was the last cap (of three) Kargus won in his career, although he was one of three goalkeepers in the West German squad for the 1978 FIFA World Cup.

After the end of his career, Kargus had several stints as coach to school kids in goalkeeping and has been active as artist painter since 1996, painting scenes of football in 2006, but exclusively non-footballing themes after that. He attended an art course at the Kunstschule Blankenese before exhibiting his paintings.

== Honours ==
Hamburger SV

- Bundesliga: 1978–79
- DFB-Pokal: 1975–76; runner-up: 1973–74, 1981–82
- European Cup Winners' Cup: 1976–77
- European Cup runner-up: 1979–80

West Germany

- European Championship runner-up: 1976
