= 1975–76 DFB-Pokal =

Tournament details
- Country: West Germany
- Teams: 128

Final positions
- Champions: Hamburger SV
- Runners-up: 1. FC Kaiserslautern

Tournament statistics
- Matches played: 136

The 1975–76 DFB-Pokal was the 33rd season of the annual German football cup competition. It began on 1 August 1975 and ended on 26 June 1976. 128 teams competed in the tournament of seven rounds. In the final Hamburger SV defeated 1. FC Kaiserslautern 2–0.

== Matches ==
=== First round ===
1 August 1975
SV Werder Bremen	0 – 3	Borussia Mönchengladbach
FC Bayern Munich	3 – 1	1. FC Saarbrücken
Karlsruher SC	4 – 2	SpVgg Bayreuth
1. FC Nürnberg	2 – 1	Rot-Weiß Essen
FC Augsburg	0 – 1	Fortuna Düsseldorf
SpVgg Erkenschwick	2 – 3	VfL Bochum
Schwarz-Weiß Essen	2 – 1	Bayer Uerdingen	(AET)
ASV Landau	1 – 7	Hannover 96
VfB Oldenburg	0 – 6	FC Schalke 04
Borussia Neunkirchen	2 – 0	Kickers Offenbach
Hamburger SV	4 – 0	1. FC Köln II
1. FC Köln	2 – 0	Olympia Wilhelmshaven
Eintracht Frankfurt	6 – 0	Viktoria Köln
FV 09 Weinheim	1 – 7	Hertha BSC
1. FC Kaiserslautern	2 – 0	VfR Mannheim
MTV Fürth	2 – 10	MSV Duisburg
SpVgg Freudenstadt	0 – 7	Eintracht Braunschweig
TSV 1860 München	2 – 1	Göttingen 05
FC St. Pauli	1 – 1	FK Pirmasens	(AET)
Tennis Borussia Berlin	2 – 0	FC Schweinfurt 05
FSV Frankfurt	1 – 1	SpVgg Fürth	(AET)
FC 08 Homburg	4 – 0	SG Union Solingen
Wuppertaler SV Borussia	3 – 0	Schwarz-Weiß Essen II
Rapide Wedding	2 – 9	VfB Stuttgart
VfR Bürstadt	1 – 2	FC Bayern Hof
SV Darmstadt 98	4 – 1	VfB Eppingen
SG 99 Andernach	0 – 2	DJK Gütersloh
SC Fortuna Köln	6 – 1	ASV Bergedorf 1885
SV Chio Waldhof	2 – 1	SV Cuxhaven
SpVgg 07 Ludwigsburg	0 – 6	Borussia Dortmund
SG Wattenscheid 09	4 – 0	Condor Hamburg
SC Jülich 1910	3 – 0	Wacker 04 Berlin
Stuttgarter Kickers	1 – 1	Holstein Kiel	(AET)
Röchling Völklingen	5 – 1	Wacker München
Arminia Bielefeld	4 – 0	SV St. Georg Hamburg
Westfalia Herne	3 – 1	Freiburger FC
TSG Thannhausen	0 – 6	Bayer 04 Leverkusen
Spandauer SV	2 – 1	Rot-Weiß Oberhausen
1. FSV Mainz 05	7 – 2	TSV Osterholz-Tenever
Preußen Münster	7 – 1	Siemensstadt Berlin
1. FC Mülheim	4 – 2	SpVgg Sterkrade
VfL Osnabrück	3 – 2	VfL Wolfsburg
KSV Hessen Kassel	1 – 0	Alemannia Aachen
SV Rot-Weiß Hasborn	3 – 1	VfL Neuwied
VfL Trier	3 – 6	TSV Kücknitz	(AET)
SV Auersmacher	6 – 0	VfB Gaggenau
FK Clausen	0 – 2	VfR Wormatia Worms
SpVgg Lindau	3 – 0	Itzehoer SV 1909
FV Hassia Bingen	7 – 0	Frisia Husum
ASV Idar-Oberstein	3 – 2	SG Frankfurt 1901 Höchst
Sportfreunde Salzgitter	0 – 1	SV Weiskirchen
FV Offenburg	2 – 0	FSV Cappel
SC Freiburg	2 – 1	Victoria Hamburg
Sportfreunde Siegen	4 – 2	ATS Kulmbach
SGO Bremen	5 – 1	1. FC Herzogenaurach
TuS Xanten	0 – 2	TS Woltmershausen 1890
Sportfreunde Schwäbisch Hall	5 – 1	TuS Mayen
Eintracht Höhr-Grenzhausen	4 – 3	SV Spielberg
Union Salzgitter	5 – 0	TSV Abbehausen
VfR Heilbronn	3 – 3	Rot-Weiß Lüdenscheid	(AET)
VfB Stuttgart II	1 – 3	HSV Barmbek-Uhlenhorst
SC Herford	3 – 1	SC Friedrichsthal
Bünder SV	2 – 2	VfR Pforzheim
FC Hertha 03 Zehlendorf	0 – 1	Blumenthaler SV 1919	(AET)

==== Replays ====
14 August 1975
FK Pirmasens	5 – 2	FC St. Pauli
SpVgg Fürth	1 – 0	FSV Frankfurt
Holstein Kiel	1 – 2	Stuttgarter Kickers
VfR Pforzheim	1 – 2	Bünder SV

=== Second round ===
18 October 1975
MSV Duisburg	4 – 0	Karlsruher SC
Bayer Leverkusen	0 – 2	VfL Bochum
FC Schalke 04	2 – 1	Borussia Dortmund
Hannover 96	1 – 2	FC 08 Homburg
Hertha BSC	4 – 2	VfB Stuttgart
1. FC Köln	8 – 2	SC Freiburg
Borussia Mönchengladbach	3 – 0	SV Rot-Weiß Hasborn
Hamburger SV	4 – 0	Union Salzgitter
Bünder SV	0 – 3	FC Bayern Munich
VfR Wormatia Worms	0 – 3	Eintracht Braunschweig
FV Offenburg	1 – 5	Eintracht Frankfurt
Preußen Münster	1 – 0	Wuppertaler SV Borussia
1. FC Nürnberg	1 – 0	SC Fortuna Köln	(AET)
SV Chio Waldhof	4 – 1	TSV 1860 München
1. FSV Mainz 05	1 – 2	Röchling Völklingen
FK Pirmasens	7 – 1	Spandauer SV
1. FC Mülheim	1 – 3	FC Bayern Hof	(AET)
Arminia Bielefeld	5 – 1	Eintracht Höhr-Grenzhausen
Schwarz-Weiß Essen	3 – 0	SGO Bremen
SV Darmstadt 98	4 – 0	VfR Heilbronn
Sportfreunde Schwäbisch Hall	0 – 5	Stuttgarter Kickers
TSV Kücknitz	0 – 1	DJK Gütersloh
Sportfreunde Siegen	1 – 2	Tennis Borussia Berlin
VfL Osnabrück	3 – 2	Borussia Neunkirchen
SpVgg Fürth	7 – 1	TS Woltmershausen 1890
SG Wattenscheid 09	4 – 0	SC Herford
Westfalia Herne	4 – 0	ASV Idar-Oberstein
SV Weiskirchen	4 – 1	SV Auersmacher
SC Jülich 1910	5 – 1	SpVgg Lindau
HSV Barmbeck-Uhlenhorst	2 – 3	FV Hassia Bingen	(AET)
KSV Hessen Kassel	2 – 3	Fortuna Düsseldorf
Blumenthaler SV 1919	1 – 5	1. FC Kaiserslautern

=== Third round ===
13 December 1975
MSV Duisburg	0 – 1	Borussia Mönchengladbach
FC Schalke 04	1 – 2	Eintracht Braunschweig
Fortuna Düsseldorf	4 – 4	VfL Bochum
1. FC Köln	3 – 1	SpVgg Fürth
FC Bayern Munich	3 – 0	Tennis Borussia Berlin
Stuttgarter Kickers	1 – 3	Hertha BSC
Eintracht Frankfurt	3 – 0	VfL Osnabrück
Westfalia Herne	1 – 3	1. FC Kaiserslautern
Hamburger SV	4 – 0	SC Jülich 1910
Arminia Bielefeld	3 – 2	DJK Gütersloh
Preußen Münster	2 – 2	Schwarz-Weiß Essen	(AET)
SV Darmstadt 98	3 – 1	1. FC Nürnberg	(AET)
FC 08 Homburg	1 – 0	SV Chio Waldhof
SG Wattenscheid 09	2 – 3	FC Bayern Hof
SV Weiskirchen	0 – 1	FK Pirmasens
Röchling Völklingen	4 – 1	FV Hassia Bingen

==== Replays ====
17 December 1975
VfL Bochum	1 – 3	Fortuna Düsseldorf
10 January 1976
Schwarz-Weiß Essen	3 – 2	Preußen Münster

=== Round of 16 ===
31 January 1976
FC Bayern Hof	0 – 2	Hamburger SV
Schwarz-Weiß Essen	1 – 1	1. FC Köln
FC 08 Homburg	3 – 0	SV Darmstadt 98
1. FC Kaiserslautern	2 – 0	Eintracht Braunschweig
Fortuna Düsseldorf	3 – 2	Borussia Mönchengladbach
Hertha BSC	1 – 0	Eintracht Frankfurt	(AET)
FK Pirmasens	0 – 2	FC Bayern Munich
11 February 1976
Röchling Völklingen	1 – 0	Arminia Bielefeld

==== Replay ====
11 February 1976
1. FC Köln	1 – 0	Schwarz-Weiß Essen	(AET)

=== Quarter-finals ===
3 April 1976
1. FC Köln	2 – 5	FC Bayern Munich
FC 08 Homburg	1 – 2	Hamburger SV
Hertha BSC	1 – 1	Röchling Völklingen	(AET)
1. FC Kaiserslautern	3 – 0	Fortuna Düsseldorf

==== Replay ====
28 April 1976
Röchling Völklingen	1 – 2	Hertha BSC

=== Semi-finals ===
4 May 1976
Hamburger SV	2 – 2	FC Bayern Munich
1. FC Kaiserslautern	4 – 2	Hertha BSC

==== Replay ====
1 June 1976
FC Bayern Munich	0 – 1	Hamburger SV

=== Final ===
26 June 1976
16:00 CET

Hamburger SV	2–0	1. FC Kaiserslautern
Nogly 22'; Bjørnmose 37'	Report

Waldstadion, Frankfurt
Attendance: 61,000
Referee: Walter Eschweiler (Euskirchen)
