= 1985–86 Newcastle United F.C. season =

Newcastle United F.C.
1985–86 season
- Chairman: Stan Seymour, Jr.
- Manager: Willie McFaul
- Stadium: St James' Park
- First Division: 11th
- FA Cup: Third round
- League Cup: Fourth round
- Top goalscorer: League: Peter Beardsley (20); All: Peter Beardsley (20)
Home colours	Away colours

In the 1985–86 football season, Newcastle United F.C. participated in the Football League First Division.

After their promotion two years previously, Newcastle aimed to consolidate their position in the top league of English football. Manager Jack Charlton resigned six days before the start of the season, leading to the appointment of Willie McFaul. The club finished 11th and performed disappointingly in the cups, losing out to Brighton and Hove Albion and Oxford United.

Paul Stephenson made his debut in a 2–1 victory over Southampton in December 1985 and soon became a first team regular. Star centre-half Glenn Roeder would go on to manage the club twenty years later. The season also saw the breakthrough of Paul Gascoigne as a regular in midfield.

== Squad ==
No.	Pos	Nat	Player	Total		First Division		FA Cup		League Cup	
No.	Pos	Nat	Player	Apps	Goals	Apps	Goals	Apps	Goals	Apps	Goals
	GK	(Wales) WAL	Martin Thomas	36	0	32	0	1	0	3	0
	GK	(Scotland) SCO	David McKellar	10	0	10	0	0	0	0	0
	GK	(England) ENG	Gary Kelly	0	0	0	0	0	0	0	0
	DF	(England) ENG	Jeff Clarke	45	3	41	3	1	0	3	0
	DF	(England) ENG	Glenn Roeder	46	6	42	6	1	0	3	0
	DF	(Ireland) EIR	John Anderson	41	3	38	3	1	0	2	0
	DF	(England) ENG	Peter Haddock	8	0	6	0	0	0	2	0
	DF	(England) ENG	Chris Hedworth	4	0	4	0	0	0	0	0
	DF	(Scotland) SCO	Rob McKinnon	1	1	1	0	0	1	0	0
	DF	(England) ENG	John Bailey	29	0	28	0	1	0	0	0
	MF	(England) ENG	Neil McDonald	34	4	23+5	4	3	0	3	0
	MF	(England) ENG	Brian Tinnion	0	0	0	0	0	0	0	0
	MF	(England) ENG	Kenny Wharton	15	2	15	2	0	0	0	0
	MF	(England) ENG	Paul Gascoigne	35	9	28+3	9	1	0	3	0
	MF	(Northern Ireland) NIR	David McCreery	42	2	39	2	1	0	2	0
	MF	(England) ENG	Gary Megson	6	0	2+2	0	0+0	0	1+1	0
	MF	(England) ENG	Paul Stephenson	23	1	22	1	1	0	0	0
	MF	(Northern Ireland) NIR	Ian Stewart	29	2	25+3	2	1	0	0	0
	MF	(England) ENG	Ian Bogie	0	0	0	0	0	0	0	0
	MF	(Wales) WAL	Alan Davies	17	1	14	1	0	0	2+1	0
	FW	(England) ENG	Joe Allon	3	1	3	1	0	0	0	0
	FW	(England) ENG	Peter Beardsley	45	19	42	19	1	0	2	0
	FW	(Jamaica) JAM	Tony Cunningham	19	3	10+7	1	0	0	2	2
	FW	(Scotland) SCO	George Reilly	19	7	17	7	0	0	2	0
	FW	(England) ENG	Billy Whitehurst	21	7	20	7	1	0	0	0
	FW	(England) ENG	Mark McGhee	0	0	0	0	0	0	0	0

== Transfers ==
=== In ===
Date	Pos.	Name	From	Fee
August 1985	GK	(Scotland) David McKellar	(Scotland) Hibernian	Season-long loan
August 1985	MF	(Wales) Alan Davies (footballer)	(England) Manchester United	?

=== Out ===
Date	Pos.	Name	To
December 1985	MF	(England) Gary Megson	(England) Sheffield Wednesday
December 1985	FW	(Scotland) George Reilly	(England) West Bromwich Albion
July 1986	DF	(England) Peter Haddock	(England) Leeds
August 1986	DF	(England) Chris Hedworth	(England) Barnsley
August 1986	DF	(Scotland) Rob McKinnon	(England) Hartlepool

==== First Division ====
17 August 1985 1	Southampton	1–1	Newcastle United	Southampton
	Puckett	Report	Beardsley	Stadium: The Dell; Attendance: 16,401

21 August 1985 2	Newcastle United	2–2	Luton Town	Newcastle upon Tyne
	Beardsley; Roeder	Report	Nwajiobi; Harford	Stadium: St James' Park; Attendance: 21,933

24 August 1985 3	Newcastle United	1–0	Liverpool	Newcastle upon Tyne
	Reilly	Report		Stadium: St James' Park; Attendance: 29,941; Referee: John Key

26 August 1985 4	Coventry City	1–2	Newcastle United	Coventry
	Gibson	Report	Stewart; Reilly	Stadium: Highfield Road; Attendance: 12,097

31 August 1985 5	Newcastle United	3–1	Queens Park Rangers	Newcastle upon Tyne
	Beardsley; Reilly; McDonald	Report	Fenwick	Stadium: St James' Park; Attendance: 25,219

4 September 1985 6	Manchester United	3–0	Newcastle United	Manchester
	Stapleton x2 Hughes	Report		Stadium: Old Trafford; Attendance: 51,102

7 September 1985 7	Tottenham Hotspur	5–1	Newcastle United	London
	Chiedozie x2 Falco; Hoddle; Hazard	Report	Davies	Stadium: White Hart Lane; Attendance: 23,883

14 September 1985 8	Newcastle United	4–1	West Bromwich Albion	Newcastle upon Tyne
	Clarke; Reilly x2 McDonald	Report	Mackenzie	Stadium: St James' Park; Attendance: 21,902

21 September 1985 9	Newcastle United	3–0	Oxford United	Newcastle upon Tyne
	Beardsley; McDonald; Gascoigne	Report		Stadium: St James' Park; Attendance: 23,642

==== FA Cup ====
4 January 1986 R3	Newcastle United	0–2	Brighton and Hove Albion	Newcastle upon Tyne
			Young Saunders	Stadium: St James' Park; Attendance: 25,112

==== League Cup ====
25 September 1985 R2	Newcastle United	0–0	Barnsley	Newcastle upon Tyne
				Stadium: St James' Park; Attendance: 18,827

7 October 1985 R2	Barnsley	0–1	Newcastle United	Barnsley
			Cunningham 117'	Stadium: Oakwell; Attendance: 10,084

30 October 1985 R3	Oxford United	3–1	Newcastle United	Oxford
	Thomas X2 Hebberd		Cunningham	Stadium: The Manor Ground; Referee: 8,096
