= 1983–84 Newcastle United F.C. season =

Newcastle United
1983–84 season
- Chairman: Stan Seymour Jr.
- Manager: Arthur Cox
- Stadium: St James' Park
- Second Division: 3rd (promoted)
- FA Cup: Third Round
- Milk Cup: Second Round
- Top goalscorer: League: Kevin Keegan (27); All: Kevin Keegan (28)
- Highest home attendance: 36,288 vs Sheffield Wednesday (Division Two, 14 April 1984)
- Lowest home attendance: 21,184 vs Oxford United (Milk Cup Second Round First Leg, 5 October 1983)
- Average home league attendance: 29,810
Home colours	Away colours

During the 1983–84 season, Newcastle United participated in the Football League Second Division. They finished 3rd and were promoted automatically to the First Division.

Former England captain Kevin Keegan was the leading scorer with 27 league goals, 28 in all competitions. He retired as a player following the final match of the season.

== Squad ==
Substitute appearances indicated in brackets

Pos.	Nat.	Name	League		Milk Cup		FA Cup		Total	
Pos.	Nat.	Name	Apps	Goals	Apps	Goals	Apps	Goals	Apps	Goals
GK	ENG	Kevin Carr	19	0	0	0	0	0	19	0
GK	WAL	Martin Thomas	23	0	2	0	1	0	26	0
DF	IRE	John Anderson	41	1	2	0	1	0	44	1
DF	ENG	Malcolm Brown	0	0	0	0	0	0	0	0
DF	ENG	Steve Carney	32(1)	0	2	0	0	0	34(1)	0
DF	ENG	John Carver	0	0	0	0	0	0	0	0
DF	ENG	Jeff Clarke	14	0	0	0	0	0	14	0
DF	ENG	Ian Dawes	0	0	0	0	0	0	0	0
DF	ENG	Peter Haddock	1(2)	0	0	0	0	0	1(2)	0
DF	ENG	Chris Hedworth	0	0	0	0	0	0	0	0
DF	ENG	Glenn Roeder	23	0	0	0	1	0	24	0
DF	ENG	John Ryan	22	1	2	0	1	0	25	1
DF	ENG	Wes Saunders	16	0	2	0	1	0	19	0
MF	NIR	David McCreery	40	0	2	0	1	0	43	0
MF	ENG	Terry McDermott	42	6	2	1	1	0	45	7
MF	ENG	Neil McDonald	10(2)	0	0	0	0(1)	0	10(3)	0
MF	ENG	John Trewick	14(2)	1	0	0	0	0	14(2)	1
MF	ENG	Kenny Wharton	38(3)	4	2	0	1	0	41(3)	4
FW	ENG	Peter Beardsley	34(1)	20	2	0	1	0	37(1)	20
FW	NIR	Paul Ferris	0	0	0	0	0	0	0	0
FW	ENG	Kevin Keegan	41	27	2	1	1	0	44	28
FW	ENG	David Mills	10(6)	5	0(2)	0	0	0	10(8)	5
FW	ENG	Chris Waddle	42	18	2	0	1	0	45	18

== League table ==
Pos	Team	Pld	W	D	L	GF	GA	GD	Pts	Relegation
1	Chelsea (C, P)	42	25	13	4	90	40	+50	88	Promotion to the First Division
2	Sheffield Wednesday (P)	42	26	10	6	72	34	+38	88	Promotion to the First Division
3	Newcastle United (P)	42	24	8	10	85	53	+32	80	Promotion to the First Division
4	Manchester City	42	20	10	12	66	48	+18	70	
5	Grimsby Town	42	19	13	10	60	47	+13	70	

Rules for classification: 1) Points; 2) Goal difference; 3) Goals scored
(C) Champions; (P) Promoted

== Results ==
=== Second Division ===
27 August 1983 1	Leeds United	0–1	Newcastle United	Leeds
			Anderson 22'	Stadium: Elland Road; Attendance: 30,806

29 August 1983 2	Newcastle United	0–1	Shrewsbury Town	Newcastle upon Tyne
			Brown 40'	Stadium: St James' Park; Attendance: 29,140

3 September 1983 3	Newcastle United	3–0	Oldham Athletic	Newcastle upon Tyne
	McDermott 28'; Waddle 58'; Mills 65'			Stadium: St James' Park; Attendance: 22,573

6 September 1983 4	Middlesbrough	3–2	Newcastle United	Middlesbrough
	Currie 39', 63'; Hamilton 86'		Keegan 48'; Mills 82'	Stadium: Ayresome Park; Attendance: 19,648

10 September 1984 5	Grimsby Town	1–1	Newcastle United	Cleethorpes
	Speight 42'		Keegan 50'	Stadium: Blundell Park; Attendance: 9000

17 September 1983 6	Newcastle United	3–1	Crystal Palace	Newcastle upon Tyne
	Ryan 17'; Waddle 50'; Keegan 53'		Evans 54'	Stadium: St James' Park; Attendance: 22,869

24 September 1984 7	Barnsley	1–1	Newcastle United	Barnsley
	Cunningham 52'		Waddle 84'	Stadium: Oakwell; Attendance: 14,085

1 October 1983 8	Newcastle United	4–2	Portsmouth	Newcastle upon Tyne
	Waddle 13', 25'; Keegan 40' (pen.); Wharton 54'		Tait 79'; Biley 84'	Stadium: St James' Park; Attendance: 25,488

8 October 1983 9	Newcastle United	2–1	Charlton Athletic	Newcastle upon Tyne
	Keegan 72', 81'		Curtis 29'	Stadium: St James' Park; Attendance: 23,329

16 October 1984 10	Swansea City	1–2	Newcastle United	Swansea
	Marustik 77'		Wharton 3'; Mills 78'	Stadium: Vetch Field; Attendance: 9807

19 October 1984 11	Cardiff City	0–2	Newcastle United	Cardiff
			Beardsley 9'; Keegan 59'	Stadium: Ninian Park; Attendance: 9926

29 October 1983 12	Newcastle United	5–0	Manchester City	Newcastle upon Tyne
	Beardsley 8', 60', 78'; Keegan 38'; Waddle 88'			Stadium: St James' Park; Attendance: 33,675

5 November 1983 13	Newcastle United	3–2	Fulham	Newcastle upon Tyne
	Keegan 23'; Mills 88'; Wharton 90'		Wilson 12', 60'	Stadium: St James' Park; Attendance: 31,660

12 November 1983 14	Chelsea	4–0	Newcastle United	London
	Spackman 7'; Rhoades-Brown 36'; Speedie 46', 67'			Stadium: Stamford Bridge; Attendance: 30,638

19 November 1983 15	Sheffield Wednesday	4–2	Newcastle United	Sheffield
	Varadi 37', 51'; Cunningham 71'; Bannister 82'		McDermott 43'; Keegan 78' (pen.)	Stadium: Hillsborough; Attendance: 41,134

26 November 1983 16	Newcastle United	2–1	Cambridge United	Newcastle upon Tyne
	Keegan 43' (pen.); Beardsley 62'		Daniels 81'	Stadium: St James' Park; Attendance: 25,065

3 December 1983 17	Derby County	3–2	Newcastle United	Derby
	Davison 60', 66'; Gemmill 71' (pen.)		Keegan 29'; Waddle 39'	Stadium: Baseball Ground; Attendance: 18,691

10 December 1983 18	Newcastle United	5–2	Huddersfield Town	Newcastle upon Tyne
	Keegan 2'; Beardsley 42'; Waddle 62', 89'; McDermott 82'		Wilson 19'; Jones 44'	Stadium: St James' Park; Attendance: 25,747

17 December 1983 19	Brighton & Hove Albion	0–1	Newcastle United	Hove
			Waddle 51'	Stadium: Goldstone Ground; Attendance: 13,896

26 December 1983 20	Newcastle United	1–1	Blackburn Rovers	Newcastle upon Tyne
	Waddle 59'		Barker 29'	Stadium: St James' Park; Attendance: 33,622

27 December 1983 21	Carlisle United	3–1	Newcastle United	Carlisle
	Shoulder 35' (pen.); Coughlin 88'; Craig 89'		Waddle 18'	Stadium: Brunton Park; Attendance: 14,756

31 December 1983 22	Oldham Athletic	1–2	Newcastle United	Oldham
	Henry 89'		Keegan 15', 62'	Stadium: Boundary Park; Attendance: 8518

2 January 1984 23	Newcastle United	1–0	Barnsley	Newcastle upon Tyne
	Waddle 12'			Stadium: St James' Park; Attendance: 29,842

21 January 1984 24	Crystal Palace	3–1	Newcastle United	London
	McCulloch 16'; Mabbutt 41'; Gilbert 44'		Beardsley 70'	Stadium: Selhurst Park; Attendance: 9464

4 February 1984 25	Portsmouth	1–4	Newcastle United	Portsmouth
	Webb 61'		Keegan 3', 73'; Beardsley 45', 67'	Stadium: Fratton Park; Attendance: 18,686

11 February 1984 26	Newcastle United	0–1	Grimsby Town	Newcastle upon Tyne
			Drinkell 17'	Stadium: St James' Park; Attendance: 28,633

18 February 1984 27	Manchester City	1–2	Newcastle United	Manchester
	Kinsey 47'		Beardsley 19'; Keegan 21'	Stadium: Maine Road; Attendance: 41,767

25 February 1984 28	Newcastle United	3–1	Cardiff City	Newcastle upon Tyne
	Waddle 12'; Keegan 44', 56' (pen.)		Vaughan 58'	Stadium: St James' Park; Attendance: 27,964

3 March 1984 29	Fulham	2–2	Newcastle United	London
	Scott 4'; Davies 25'		Beardsley 3'; Keegan 67'	Stadium: Craven Cottage; Attendance: 12,290

10 March 1984 30	Newcastle United	1–1	Chelsea	Newcastle upon Tyne
	McDermott 70'		Speedie 52'	Stadium: St James' Park; Attendance: 36,506

17 March 1984 31	Newcastle United	3–1	Middlesbrough	Newcastle upon Tyne
	Beardsley 12'; McDermott 75'; Keegan 77'		Bell 3'	Stadium: St James' Park; Attendance: 30,421

24 March 1984 32	Shrewsbury Town	2–2	Newcastle United	Shrewsbury
	Cross 51', 78'		Johnson 52' (o.g.); Keegan 55'	Stadium: Gay Meadow; Attendance: 8313

28 March 1984 33	Newcastle United	1–0	Leeds United	Newcastle upon Tyne
	Irwin 25' (o.g.)			Stadium: St James' Park; Attendance: 31,222

31 March 1984 34	Newcastle United	2–0	Swansea City	Newcastle upon Tyne
	Wharton 76'; Beardsley 88'			Stadium: St James' Park; Attendance: 27,329

7 April 1984 35	Charlton Athletic	1–3	Newcastle United	London
	Dowman 22'		Waddle 31'; McDermott 88'; Beardsley 89'	Stadium: The Valley; Attendance: 15,289

14 April 1984 36	Newcastle United	0–1	Sheffield Wednesday	Newcastle upon Tyne
			Shelton 77'	Stadium: St James' Park; Attendance: 36,288

20 April 1984 37	Blackburn Rovers	1–1	Newcastle United	Blackburn
	Fazackerley 48' (pen.)		Trewick 74'	Stadium: Ewood Park; Attendance: 19,196

23 April 1984 38	Newcastle United	5–1	Carlisle United	Newcastle upon Tyne
	Keegan 12', 54'; Waddle 39'; Beardsley 73', 77'		Coughlin 80'	Stadium: St James' Park; Attendance: 33,458

28 April 1984 39	Cambridge United	1–0	Newcastle United	Cambridge
	Smith 38' (pen.)			Stadium: Abbey Stadium; Attendance: 7720

5 May 1984 40	Newcastle United	4–0	Derby County	Newcastle upon Tyne
	Keegan 17'; Beardsley 22', 80'; Waddle 50'			Stadium: St James' Park; Attendance: 35,866

7 May 1984 41	Huddersfield Town	2–2	Newcastle United	Huddersfield
	Cooper 22'; Carney 26' (o.g.)		Beardsley 41'; Mills 45'	Stadium: Leeds Road; Attendance: 25,101

12 May 1984 42	Newcastle United	3–1	Brighton & Hove Albion	Newcastle upon Tyne
	Keegan 22'; Waddle 50'; Beardsley 85'		Ryan 41'	Stadium: St James' Park; Attendance: 36,286

=== Milk Cup ===
5 October 1983 2nd Round 1st Leg	Newcastle United	1–1	Oxford United	Newcastle upon Tyne
	McDermott 87'		Biggins 37'	Stadium: St James' Park; Attendance: 21,184

26 October 1983 2nd Round 2nd Leg	Oxford United	2–1	Newcastle United	Oxford
	Whatmore 19'; Thomas 32'		Keegan 81'	Stadium: Manor Ground; Attendance: 13,040

=== FA Cup ===
6 January 1984 3rd Round	Liverpool	4–0	Newcastle United	Liverpool
	Robinson 7'; Rush 29', 86'; Johnston 63'			Stadium: Anfield; Attendance: 33,566
