= 1978–79 Hamburger SV season =

Hamburger SV
1978–79 season
- Manager: Branko Zebec
- Stadium: Volksparkstadion
- Bundesliga: 1st
- DFB-Pokal: First round
- Top goalscorer: League: Kevin Keegan (17); All: Kevin Keegan (17)
- Average home league attendance: 42,441

The 1978–79 Hamburger SV season was the 32nd season in the club's history and the 16th consecutive season playing in the Bundesliga.

== Season summary ==
=== Bundesliga ===
Despite personal success for star player Kevin Keegan, who won the Ballon d'Or in 1978, the previous season saw mixed results as Hamburg finished ninth in the Bundesliga. Before the 1978–79 season started, Yugoslavian Branko Zebec was appointed manager of HSV. He had previously guided Bayern Munich to the Bundesliga title in 1968–69.

In the summer, new additions to the team were also brought in including Horst Hrubesch, who arrived from Rot-Weiss Essen for £450,000, Jimmy Hartwig, one of Germany’s first non-white players, was signed from 1860 Munich and Bernd Wehmeyer arrived from Hannover 96.

Zebec managed the club to its first ever Bundesliga title in 1978–79, one point ahead of closest challengers VfB Stuttgart, and the club's fourth German championship overall and first since 1960. The team was led by Kevin Keegan along with young, rising German talent including Felix Magath, Horst Hrubesch, and Manfred Kaltz. Keegan was top scorer for HSV, with 17 goals, and was awarded the Ballon d'Or for a second successive year.

Keegan's first goal of the season came in a 5–0 demolition of Borussia Dortmund on 4 November 1978. Hrubesch also needed a bedding-in period and didn’t find the back of the net for his new club until his sixth game but would eventually add 13 goals, benefiting from cross delivered by right-back Manfred Kaltz.

1. FC Kaiserslautern made the early running in the Bundesliga, but HSV closed the gap to one point just before Christmas with a 1–0 victory at Bayern Munich and a 3–1 success against Arminia Bielefeld, a match that saw Keegan score a hat-trick. After 17 rounds, the halfway stage, Kaiserslautern, Hamburg and VfB Stuttgart were separated by just two points. After the winter break, Hamburg appeared to be off the pace and earned one point from their first three games. By the start of April 1979 and in the midst of a 12 match unbeaten run, a 3–0 win against Kaiserslautern paired with a 1–4 home defeat by Stuttgart at the hands of FC Köln, put HSV in position to win their first Bundesliga title. Hamburg lost to Bayern on the final day of the season but had built a three point lead going into the matchday and were crowned champions with 49 points.

=== DFB-Pokal ===
HSV also competed in this season's edition of the DFB-Pokal, losing in the first round to Arminia Bielefeld on 5 August 1978.

== Squad ==
Hamburger SV
Goalkeeper: Rudi Kargus (34).

Defenders: Manfred Kaltz (34 / 6); Peter Nogly (captain; 34 / 1); Ivan Buljan (Socialist Federal Republic of Yugoslavia) (32 / 5); Peter Hidien (31 / 3); Hans-Jürgen Ripp (8); Uwe Beginski (1).
Midfielders: Kevin Keegan (England) (34 / 17); Jimmy Hartwig (34 / 10); Caspar Memering (34 / 4); Horst Bertl (24 / 5); Felix Magath (captain; 21 / 4).
Forwards: Horst Hrubesch (34 / 13); Willi Reimann (26 / 5); Bernd Wehmeyer (19 / 2); Hans-Günther Plücken (7 / 1).
(league appearances and goals listed in brackets)

Manager: Branko Zebec (Socialist Federal Republic of Yugoslavia) .

On the roster but did not play in a Bundesliga match: Jürgen Stars; Bernd Gorski; Andreas Karow; Thomas Bliemeister.

== Competitions ==
=== Overall record ===
Competition	First match	Last match	Starting round	Final position	Record							
Competition	First match	Last match	Starting round	Final position	Pld	W	D	L	GF	GA	GD	Win %
Bundesliga	12 August 1978	9 June 1979	Matchday 1	Winners	34	21	7	6	78	32	+46	61.76
DFB-Pokal	5 August 1978		First round	First round	1	0	0	1	1	2	−1	0.00
Total					35	21	7	7	79	34	+45	60.00

Source: World Football

=== Bundesliga ===
==== League table ====
Pos	Team	Pld	W	D	L	GF	GA	GD	Pts	Qualification or relegation
1	Hamburger SV (C)	34	21	7	6	78	32	+46	49	Qualification to European Cup first round
2	VfB Stuttgart	34	20	8	6	73	34	+39	48	Qualification to UEFA Cup first round (Note: Borussia Mönchengladbach won the 1978–79 UEFA Cup and thereby automatically qualified as defending champions.)
3	1. FC Kaiserslautern	34	16	11	7	62	47	+15	43	Qualification to UEFA Cup first round
4	Bayern Munich	34	16	8	10	69	46	+23	40	Qualification to UEFA Cup first round
5	Eintracht Frankfurt	34	16	7	11	50	49	+1	39	Qualification to UEFA Cup first round

Source: www.dfb.de
Rules for classification: 1) points; 2) goal difference; 3) number of goals scored.
(C) Champions

==== Matches ====
Hamburg's score comes first

Win	Draw	Loss

Date	Opponent	Venue	Result	Attendance	Scorers
12 August 1978	Borussia Mönchengladbach	H	3–0	59,000	Reimann, Nogly, Kaltz (pen)
19 August 1978	Werder Bremen	A	1–1	28,000	Reimann
26 August 1978	VfL Bochum	H	1–1	32,000	Hartwig
2 September 1978	VfB Stuttgart	A	0–1	50,000	
9 September 1978	Hertha BSC	H	4–1	26,000	Magath, Betl, Hartwig (2)
16 September 1978	FC Köln	A	3–1	44,000	Hartwig, Hidien, Hrubesch
30 September 1978	SV Darmstadt 98	H	2–1	21,000	Betl, Hartwig
6 October 1978	1. FC Kaiserslautern	A	1–2	34,000	Hrubesch
14 October 1978	Nürnberg	H	4–1	25,000	Hrubesch, Kaltz (pen), Reimann, Hartwig
21 October 1978	Fortuna Düsseldorf	A	2–0	29,000	Kaltz (pen), Reimann
28 October 1978	Eintracht Braunschweig	A	0–1	33,600	
4 November 1978	Borussia Dortmund	H	5–0	33,000	Betl, Hrubesch, Reimann, Keegan, Wehmeyer
10 November 1978	MSV Duisburg	A	2–0	20,000	Hrubesch (2)
18 November 1978	Schalke 04	H	4–2	61,500	Keegan (2), Hrubesch, Betl
25 November 1978	Eintracht Frankfurt	A	0–0	50,000	
16 December 1978	Bayern Munich	A	1–0	56,000	Memering
23 December 1978	Arminia Bielefeld	H	3–1	40,000	Keegan (3)
3 February 1979	VfB Stuttgart	H	1–1	58,000	Buljan
9 February 1979	Borussia Mönchengladbach	A	3–4	28,500	Buljan, Hrubesch (2)
3 March 1979	VfL Bochum	A	1–2	33,000	Hrubesch
10 March 1979	Hertha BSC	A	3–1	22,600	Keegan (2), Memering
14 March 1979	Werder Bremen	H	2–2	40,000	Kaltz (pen), Hartwig
24 March 1979	SV Darmstadt 98	A	2–1	22,000	Kalb (own goal), Hartwig
4 April 1979	1. FC Kaiserslautern	H	3–0	60,500	Hidien, Keegan, Magath
7 April 1979	1. FC Nürnberg	H	3–3	25,000	Buljan, Hrubesch, Hidien
14 April 1979	Fortuna Düsseldorf	H	2–1	36,000	Hrubesch, Kaltz (pen)
18 April 1979	Eintracht Braunschweig	H	2–0	35,000	Keegan, Hartwig
21 April 1979	Borussia Dortmund	A	3–1	36,100	Wehmeyer, Memering, Plücken
5 May 1979	MSV Duisburg	H	3–0	25,000	Keegan, Jakobs (own goal), Magath
8 May 1979	FC Köln	H	6–0	62,000	Memering, Hartwig, Keegan (2), Kaltz (pen), Magath
12 May 1979	Schalke 04	A	3–1	50,000	Keegan (2), Buljan
19 May 1979	Eintracht Frankfurt	H	4–0	46,000	Buljan, Hrubesch, Keegan, Betl
2 June 1979	Arminia Bielefeld	A	0–0	34,900	
9 June 1979	Bayern Munich	H	1–2	61,500	Keegan

=== DFB Pokal ===
Round	Date	Opponent	Venue	Result	Attendance	Goalscorers
R1	5 August 1978	Arminia Bielefeld	A	1–2 (a.e.t.)	22,000	Wehmeyer
