= John Anderson (footballer, born 1959) =

Irish footballer

Personal information
- Full name: John Christopher Patrick Anderson
- Date of birth: 7 November 1959 (age 66)
- Place of birth: Dublin, Ireland
- Height: 5 ft 11 in (1.80 m)
- Position: Defender

Youth career
- Stella Maris

Senior career*
Years	Team	Apps	(Gls)
1976–1979	West Bromwich Albion	0	(0)
1979–1982	Preston North End	51	(0)
1982–1992	Newcastle United	337	(14)
Total		350	(14)

International career
1979–1988	Republic of Ireland	16	(1)
- * Club domestic league appearances and goals

John Christopher Patrick Anderson (born 7 November 1959) is an Irish former professional footballer who played as a defender, best known for his decade long stint with Newcastle United. He represented the Republic of Ireland from 1979 to 1988, and was a squad member at UEFA Euro 1980.

== Club career ==
Anderson was on the books of West Bromwich Albion between 1976 and 1979. Despite playing in 92 reserve team games for the club, he never made a single first team appearance for the club in a major competition.

Anderson signed for Newcastle United in 1982 on a free transfer from Preston North End. His signing was low key because the club had recently pulled off a major coup in signing England captain Kevin Keegan. A very versatile player, Anderson made his debut in the 2–1 win at Blackburn Rovers on 1 September 1982.

In the 1983–84 season, Anderson played in one of the most entertaining sides in Newcastle's history as the club scored 85 goals and gained promotion back to the top flight, in a side that featured Keegan, Chris Waddle, Peter Beardsley and Terry McDermott. Anderson played in 41 of the 42 league matches that season. He was given a testimonial by the club in 1992 after 10 years as a Newcastle player, during which time he made 337 league appearances, scoring 14 goals. One of his goals was a 25-yard free kick in a game at Vicarage Road in the early 1990s against Watford.

== International career ==
Anderson represented the Republic of Ireland at schoolboy, youth and under-21 levels.

Anderson's only international goal was the match winner in the 3–2 victory over the United States in a friendly game at Dalymount Park on 29 October 1979. This was only his second cap, coming on as a substitute for Pierce O'Leary. It was a much better result than his first cap, also as a substitute but for John Devine. That game was the 4–1 defeat to Czechoslovakia, played in the Stadion Evžena Rošického on 26 September 1979. Anderson's first international start came in the 1–0 defeat to Chile, played in the National Stadium in Santiago on 22 May 1982.

He won 16 caps for the senior team and was in the squad for UEFA Euro 1988, although he was an unused substitute for all of the three Group B matches. He missed out on going to the 1990 FIFA World Cup in Italy. His last game for Ireland was in the testimonial for Peadar O'Driscoll against Tunisia on 19 October 1988, with Ireland winning, 4–0.

== After football ==
Anderson retired from playing football in 1992. He was always a fans' favourite at St James' Park and he is regularly asked to come to the club for ex-players' events. He also works as an analyst on Republic of Ireland international matches for RTÉ radio and summariser on Newcastle games for BBC Radio Newcastle.

In November 2025, Anderson was inducted into the Newcastle United Hall of Fame.
