= Kevin Keegan =

English football player and manager (1951–2026)

Kevin Keegan OBE
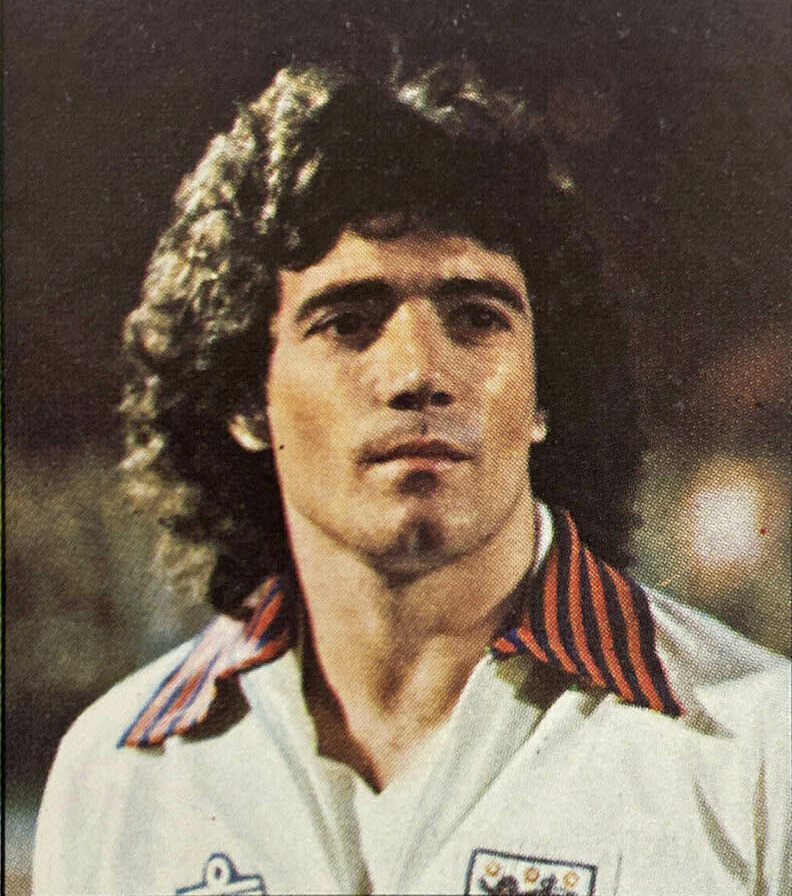
- Keegan with England in 1980

Personal information
- Full name: Joseph Kevin Keegan
- Date of birth: 14 February 1951
- Place of birth: Armthorpe, England
- Date of death: 20 July 2026 (aged 75)
- Height: 5 ft 8 in (1.73 m)
- Positions: Attacking midfielder; forward

Youth career
- Elmfield House YC
- 1967–1968: Scunthorpe United

Senior career*
Years	Team	Apps	(Gls)
1968–1971	Scunthorpe United	124	(18)
1971–1977	Liverpool	230	(68)
1977–1980	Hamburger SV	90	(32)
1980–1982	Southampton	68	(37)
1982–1984	Newcastle United	78	(48)
1985	Blacktown City	2	(1)
Total		592	(204)

International career
1972	England U23	5	(1)
1972–1982	England	63	(21)

Managerial career
- 1992–1997: Newcastle United
- 1997–1999: Fulham
- 1999–2000: England
- 2001–2005: Manchester City
- 2008: Newcastle United
- * Club domestic league appearances and goals

Joseph Kevin Keegan (14 February 1951 – 20 July 2026) was an English football player and manager who played as an attacking midfielder or forward. Nicknamed "King Kev" or "Mighty Mouse", Keegan was recognised for his dribbling ability, finishing and presence in the air, as much as he was for his distinctive appearance and charismatic personality. He is regarded as one of the greatest players of all time and was a widely recognised figure of English football during the 1970s, winning consecutive Ballons d'Or in 1978 and 1979.

Keegan began his playing career at Scunthorpe United in 1968, before Bill Shankly signed him for Liverpool. There, he won three First Division titles, the UEFA Cup twice, the FA Cup and, in his final season, the European Cup. During this period, he was a regular member of the England national team, and captained the team on 31 occasions, including at UEFA Euro 1980. He moved to Hamburger SV in the summer of 1977 and was named European Footballer of the Year in both 1978 and 1979. Hamburg won the Bundesliga title in the 1978–79 season and reached the 1980 European Cup final. Keegan left Hamburg and played at Southampton for two seasons, before transferring to Newcastle United in the Second Division in 1982. He helped Newcastle secure promotion in his second season, and retired from playing in 1984. He scored 204 goals in 592 appearances in his club career, adding 21 goals in 63 caps for England.

He moved into management at Newcastle in 1992, and the team won promotion to the Premier League as First Division champions in his first full season. Newcastle finished second in the Premier League in the 1995–96 season, despite leading the way for most of the campaign. After managing Fulham for two seasons, he took charge of the England national team in February 1999, but resigned in October 2000 following a 1–0 loss against Germany in qualification for the 2002 FIFA World Cup. In 2001, he became manager of Manchester City for four years, until he resigned in 2005. Keegan had been out of football for almost three years when he returned to Newcastle for a second spell as manager in January 2008, but this lasted only eight months, as he resigned in September following speculation about a dispute with the club's directors. The three clubs he managed were promoted as champions in his first full season in charge of them.

== Early years ==
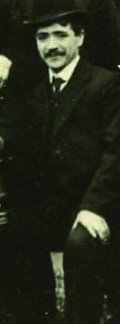
Keegan's grandfather Frank Keegan

Joseph Kevin Keegan was born on 14 February 1951 at his aunt Nellie's house in Elm Place in Armthorpe, as she had electricity, which made it safer for childbirth. He was the second of three children of Joe and Doris Keegan. His father, a Geordie, had moved to Armthorpe, in Doncaster (then in the West Riding of Yorkshire) to work in a colliery, where he met and married Doris. Keegan attended St Peter's High School in nearby Cantley.

Keegan's paternal ancestors arrived in Newcastle from Ireland. In 1909, his grandfather Frank, an inspector, heroically saved lives in the West Stanley Pit disasters. His father Joe and uncle Frank were Newcastle United supporters, describing their favourite players as Hughie Gallacher and Jackie Milburn. Keegan's father never saw him play for Newcastle.

Keegan was given his first football by his uncle and his first pair of football boots by his father after he won betting on horses. They were a second-hand pair of Winit boots bought from a sports shop run by former Doncaster Rovers centre forward Ray Harrison. Keegan played football at Hyde Park using his baby brother Michael's pushchair as a goal post. As a boy, he supported Doncaster Rovers. His favourite player was Alick Jeffrey, a player once described by Matt Busby's assistant, Jimmy Murphy, as the English Pelé, and once described by Milburn as "the best young player he had ever seen". As a schoolboy, Keegan had a trial for Coventry City under manager Jimmy Hill. Despite being one of two players kept on for an extra six-week period, the club did not offer him a contract. They did offer apprenticeship terms to the right-back Brian Joy, who went on to have a 15-year career in football. Keegan had another trial with Doncaster Rovers arranged by his father, but when he arrived he found out he had the wrong information: the trial was earlier in the day and at a different place.

Keegan participated in various sports, including cross-country running, rugby, and football, and served his school's cricket team as captain. He also boxed at his local club, run by the former British Heavyweight champion Bruce Woodcock. At age 15, Keegan and two friends completed a 50-mile run from Nottingham to Doncaster. In his autobiography, he said this run prepared him physically and psychologically for any running he had to do in future pre-season training or football matches. He left school with O Levels in History and Art.

External videos
- Keegan on his introduction to football, Newcastle…, and also his early career in England with Scunthorpe and Liverpool. Interview with Steve Harmison

At the age of 15, Keegan started working at Pegler Brass Works as an office clerk, though he said he was more of a tea boy and messenger than a clerk. Whilst working at Pegler, he played Saturday afternoon football for his local youth club, Elmfield House, and Sunday morning football for the Lonsdale Hotel. It was during this time that a colleague named Harry Holland invited him to play for the Peglers Works reserves. His chance at professional football came when he was playing Sunday morning league football for the Lonsdale Hotel in a match against Woodfield Social in 1966. Keegan was marked by an older player named Bob Nellis, who was so impressed by his ability that he offered him a trial at Fourth Division side Scunthorpe United – one of just two professional sides in the division. This trial led to Scunthorpe manager Ron Ashman giving Keegan his first contract in professional football.

== Club career ==
=== 1966–1971: Scunthorpe United ===
Scunthorpe United could not afford a set of football nets and trained on a rugby pitch at Quibell Park. They also had five-a-side training sessions on the Old Show Ground concrete car park. Keegan took training very seriously, and he did twice-a-week training with teammate Derek Hemstead by doing weighted farmers walks up and down the cantilever stand at the Old Show Ground. In running drills at Scunthorpe, Keegan liked trying to finish first and was told by coach Jack Brownsword that one thing he had going for him was that he was a "one-hundred percenter" and he should never lose that. This was the first of his running drills that would later irritate senior professionals such as Liverpool's Tommy Smith, and Bill Shankly would advise Keegan that he did not have to win all his runs.

Scunthorpe did not have the funds for a full-time driver to drive them to away games, so Keegan and the other younger players would take turns in driving the minibus to and from away games. Keegan, Nigel Jackson, Jimmy Coyne, Alan Olbison and Steve Hibbotson once borrowed Brownsword's stopwatch and had timed rallies around the Old Show Ground with the club's vintage tractor. On Keegan's turn, the tractor crashed and the axle went through the engine. The tractor was very expensive to fix, and the five players were harshly reprimanded by manager Ron Ashman. This experience gave Keegan awareness of his responsibility as a representative of Scunthorpe United. In 1968, Keegan made his debut against Peterborough United at the age of 17, and went on to make 29 league starts in his first season. He became a regular in the first team by the 1969–70 season, playing all 46 league games for the club. That season saw the team reach the fifth round of the FA Cup, beating First Division side Sheffield Wednesday along the way. His low wages at Scunthorpe meant Keegan had to find summer jobs, such as plate-laying at the Appleby Frodingham Steelworks.

Keegan played regularly in a creative right midfield role for the Scunthorpe first team, scoring 18 goals in 124 games for the club. After his first season, he started attracting interest from higher division clubs. In a rare televised interview at Scunthorpe during the 1969–70 season, Keegan tried to play down the interest, stating: "I'm getting first-team football here. Should think if I went First Division, I'd struggle a bit." Not long after this interview, Keegan began to feel impatient about playing in higher divisions and even considered quitting the game and getting a full-time job. Higher division clubs such as Preston North End, Birmingham City, Notts County, Millwall and Arsenal all showed interest in Keegan but nothing came of it.

=== 1971–1977: Liverpool ===
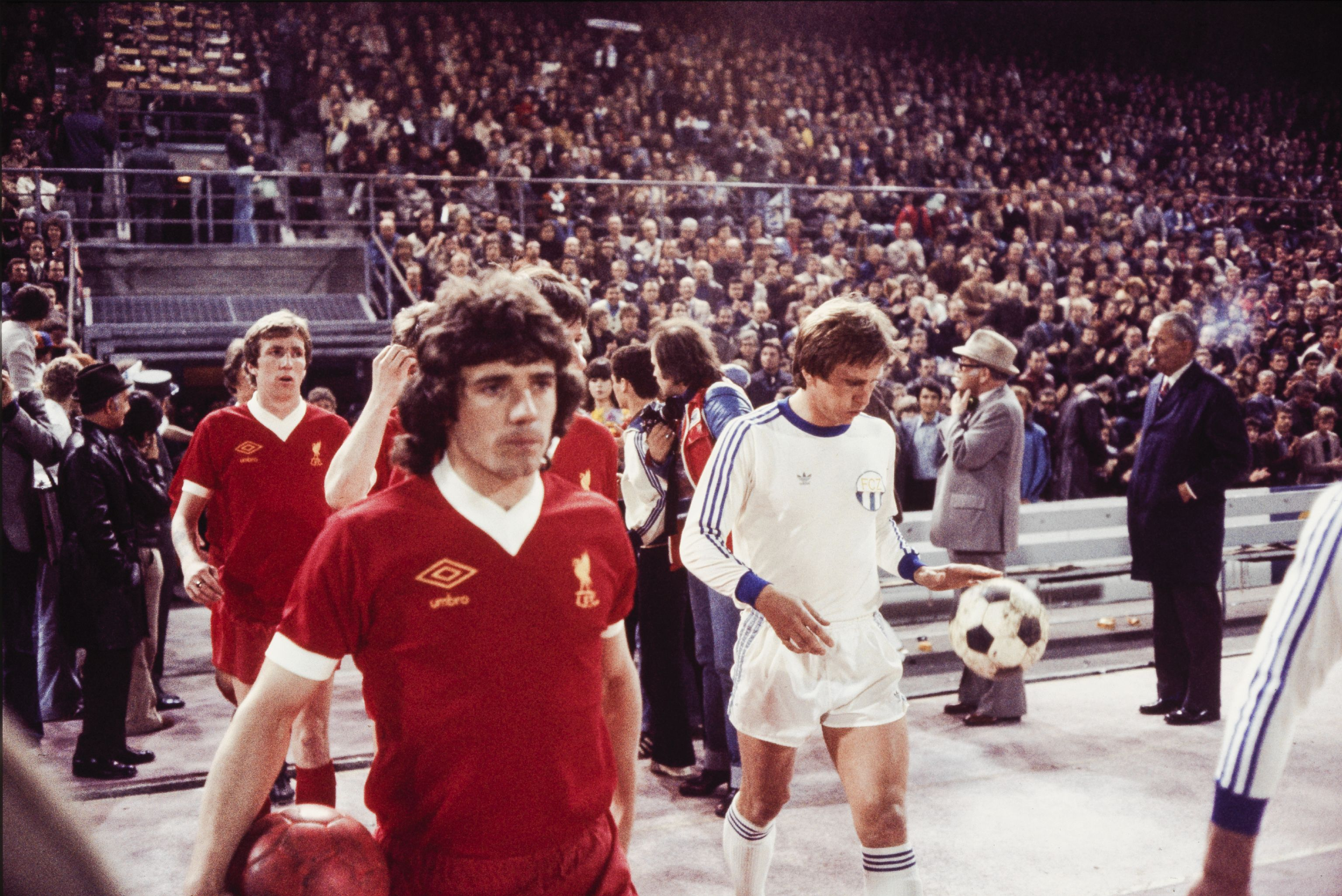
Keegan (left) walking out for Liverpool against FC Zürich in 1977

In 1971, Keegan attracted the attention of Liverpool's head scout Geoff Twentyman, whose opinion was held in high regard by manager Bill Shankly. After Twentyman's recommendation, Liverpool made an offer for Keegan which Scunthorpe accepted. After Scunthorpe agreed to the fee offered, Keegan was driven the four hours to Liverpool by manager Ron Ashman, who was determined to get a cash influx for the club. Prior to the journey, Keegan's father advised Keegan to not sell himself cheap. Keegan negotiated a contract worth £50 a week after Shankly had originally offered him £45. Ashman, sensing the deal may fall through, was at one stage aghast at Keegan's negotiation tactics. On the drive back to Scunthorpe, Ashman was critical of Keegan's bluff that he was earning almost £45 a week at a Fourth Division club. After the negotiation, 20-year-old Keegan was transferred to Liverpool for a fee of £33,000.

Liverpool bought Keegan as a midfielder, but Shankly soon decided to move Keegan up front alongside John Toshack. In a reserve match against Tranmere Rovers, Keegan played right midfield, and after playing with an attacking mindset he was strongly warned by Ronnie Moran that he was "playing too free and easy", and "nearly playing up front". Keegan took Moran's criticism as a slight, and for a period perceived that Moran strongly had it in for him. As a result of Keegan's lack of positional discipline, he was tested up front in a preseason reserve match against Southport. Keegan scored both goals in a 2–1 victory observed by Shankly. Liverpool then tried Keegan in attack at Melwood in a game between the first team and reserves. Keegan played for the first team and scored four in a 7–0 victory. His attacking ability prompted Shankly to keep Keegan up front, and he was immediately deployed as the new strike partner for Toshack. Though Keegan liked Toshack as a teammate, they did not socialise off the pitch, and Keegan said it was strange how quickly they could understand each other's play styles. Keegan said that the only other player who reached that level of football understanding with him was England international Trevor Brooking. On 14 August 1971, Keegan made his Liverpool debut against Nottingham Forest at Anfield, scoring after 12 minutes. Keegan's impact at Liverpool became such that Shankly devoted an entire chapter of his autobiography to him entitled A Boy Called Keegan, and called him "the inspiration of the new team". Shankly's advice to Keegan before a game was "just go out and drop a few hand grenades all over the place son." On his relationship with Shankly and the supporters, Keegan would write, "Liverpool made me, not just as a footballer but as a person."

In the 1972–73 season, Keegan won his first major titles. As the season was coming to a close, Liverpool was in a tight race with Leeds United and Arsenal for the top spot in the First Division. Don Revie's Leeds squad visited Anfield for a showdown on Easter Monday. Two plays on either side of halftime decided the match. First, Leeds' Peter Lorimer missed an open goal just before halftime. Two minutes after the break, Peter Cormack scored to put Liverpool ahead. Keegan added a late second goal to seal the win. Arsenal dropped a point at Southampton, and Liverpool clinched the title with a 0–0 draw against Leicester City in the final game. This was their first major trophy since 1966. In the UEFA Cup, Liverpool reached the final, where they would face German side Borussia Mönchengladbach. The first leg at Anfield was abandoned after 27 minutes due to a downpour and rescheduled for the next day. The 27 minutes they played gave Shankly an insight into Mönchengladbach's defensive vulnerability in the air. To exploit this, he brought tall forward Toshack into the starting team, demoting the smaller Brian Hall, who appeared only as a late substitute. Keegan scored two goals set up by Toshack headers in a 3–0 win. Liverpool lost the second leg 2–0 away, winning the title 3–2 on aggregate.

"Kevin Keegan was Liverpool's superstar for much of the 1970s and signed off by helping to win the club's first European Cup on his final appearance. Nimble, skilful, courageous and non-stop, Keegan [formed] a superb strike partnership with John Toshack [...] plundering exactly a century of goals while wearing the red shirt."

— Liverpool F.C. profile on Keegan ranking him 14th in their greatest players list.

Keegan was a frequent scorer the following season, but Liverpool lost the league title to a Leeds team that went unbeaten for a then-record 29 games at the start of the season. The team were more successful in the FA Cup. Their campaign in the competition started with a match against the club which had rejected Keegan, Doncaster Rovers, and it was Keegan who scored both Liverpool goals in a 2–2 draw. Liverpool won the replay and advanced. Keegan scored twice more on the way to the cup finals at Wembley Stadium, including a lob-volley over the head of Peter Shilton in the semi-final against Leicester City at Villa Park.

In the 1974 final, Liverpool played Newcastle United. Keegan explained Liverpool players were motivated by trash-talk from Newcastle's Malcolm Macdonald and John Tudor. Macdonald and Tudor gave pre-game interviews confidently proclaiming superiority over Liverpool and criticising older Liverpool professionals like Tommy Smith. Keegan also believed Shankly may have got into the heads of the Newcastle players when, on the night before the game, Shankly and Newcastle manager Joe Harvey were being interviewed. Shankly was audible off-camera, stating, "Joe looks a bag of nerves..." Keegan explained it would not have surprised him if this was not an accident, and that Shankly did this to neutralise Newcastle's confidence. In the final, Keegan scored twice as Liverpool beat Newcastle 3–0. He opened the scoring with a volley; his second was the culmination of a sequence of passes that led the commentator to exclaim "Newcastle were stripped naked!." Keegan claimed that with 100,000 people in attendance, the non-stop chanting of both sets of supporters, and the millions watching on television, this game was "as close to a non-drug-induced psychedelic experience as he could ever get".

Keegan's next visit to Wembley was three months later in the Charity Shield, the traditional curtain raiser to a new season, in what was the last game Shankly led the team out. The match was contentious and turned violent. Leeds midfielder Johnny Giles punched an unsuspecting Keegan, but was spared getting sent off after Keegan asked the referee to be lenient. Giles later lunged two-footed at Keegan. Upon Keegan's outraged reaction, Billy Bremner challenged Keegan, who then exploded and punched Bremner. Bremner punched back, and they were both sent off, the first time anyone had been sent off in a Charity Shield match. Both players removed their shirts in protest, with Keegan vocally outraged by the decision. Inside the Liverpool dressing room, Bremner approached Keegan to apologise and was met by the fury of Keegan's father who had come down to check on his son. The fight was shown that night on the BBC. Keegan and Bremner were fined £500 each, with Keegan being suspended for three games and Bremner eight. Despite this, Keegan, Bremner and Giles remained good friends outside of football. The next year saw Keegan score 12 goals for Liverpool, but the 1974–75 season was a trophyless season. There were numerous honours for Keegan over the next two years, however, as Liverpool again won the League championship and UEFA Cup in the 1975–76 season. Keegan scored in both legs of the UEFA Cup final against FC Bruges, which Liverpool won 4–3 on aggregate. Having to get a result at Wolverhampton Wanderers on the final day to win the league, Keegan equalised for Liverpool with only 14 minutes remaining before the team ran out 3–1 winners. That season he was named the Football Writers' Association Footballer of the Year.

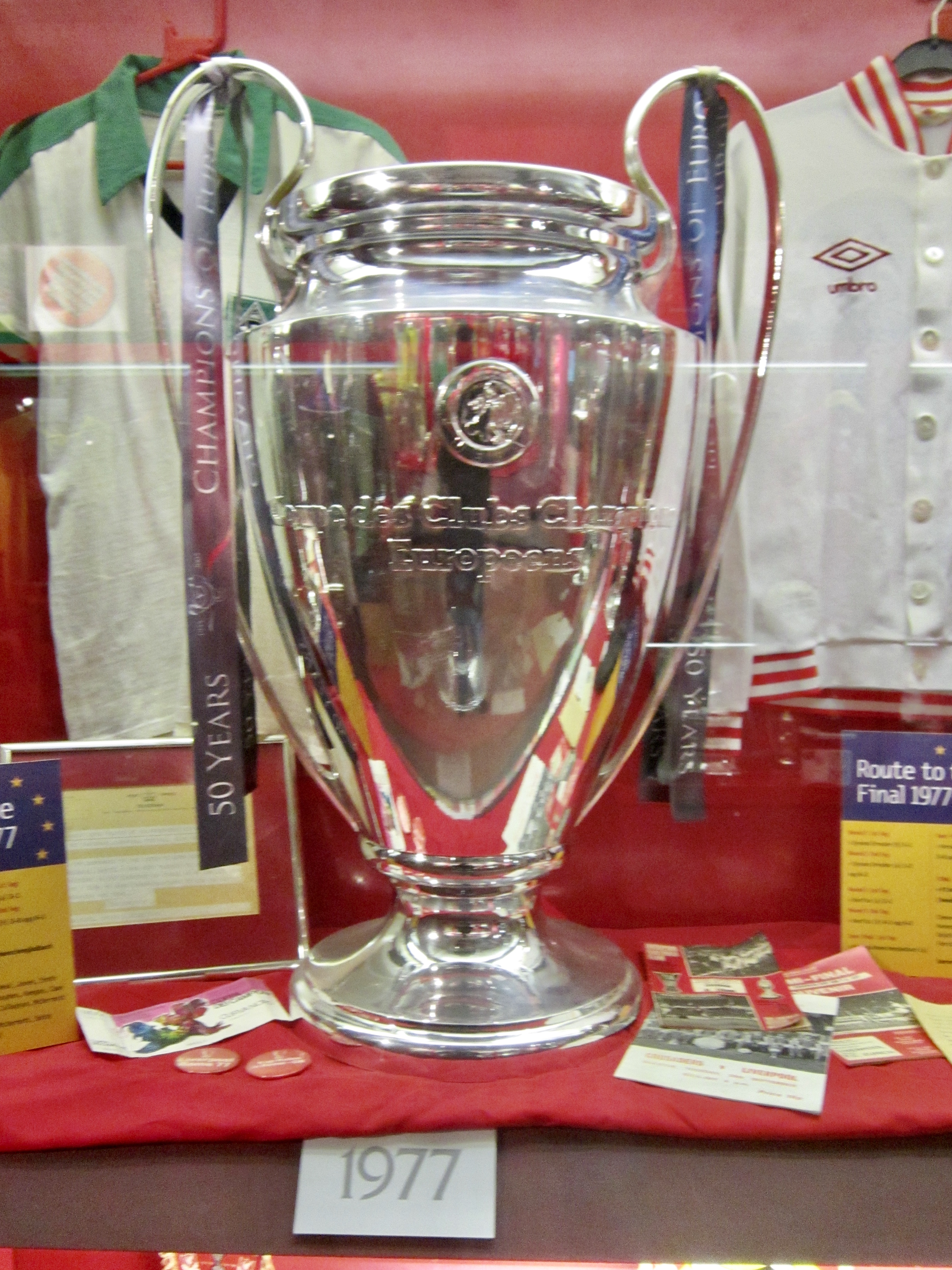
The 1977 European Cup in the Liverpool F.C. museum that Keegan lifted in his last game for the club

In the 1976–77 season, Keegan helped Liverpool win the League championship and European Cup. Midway through the season, he announced his intention to leave Liverpool in the summer to play abroad. The club's leading goalscorer in a season for a third time, he scored 20 goals and had 18 assists in his final season for Liverpool, which included scoring the opener in their comeback win against Saint-Étienne in the second-leg of the quarter-final of the European Cup at Anfield. His last appearance in a Liverpool shirt on home soil was in their defeat in the FA Cup final to bitter rivals Manchester United. The European Cup final in Rome against Borussia Mönchengladbach was four days later. Keegan did not score, but he did make a late run which led to a foul inside the penalty area by Berti Vogts. This led to a penalty which was successfully converted by Phil Neal, sealing a 3–1 win. Having ran man-marker Vogts ragged, the Daily Post wrote "Keegan in his farewell flourish wrote his name over this game". During the season, on 4 December 1976, Keegan's father died of cancer at the age of 71.

After 323 appearances and 100 goals, Keegan left Liverpool. He had offers from clubs across Europe, and chose to join Hamburger SV in the West German Bundesliga for £500,000. Liverpool replaced him with Kenny Dalglish. Of his time in Liverpool, Keegan later said, "The only thing I fear is missing an open goal in front of the Kop. I would die if that were to happen. When they start singing 'You'll Never Walk Alone' my eyes start to water. There have been times when I've actually been crying while I've been playing."

In his post-Liverpool career, Keegan received an award in London, which to his surprise was presented to him by Shankly. Keegan immediately gave the award to Shankly, crediting his former manager for his playing career. In the 2017 documentary, Shankly: Nature's Fire, an emotional Keegan recalled Shankly's funeral in 1981 where Shankly's wife Nessie gave him back his award, which had been Shankly's dying wish that it be returned to him.

=== 1977–1980: Hamburger SV ===
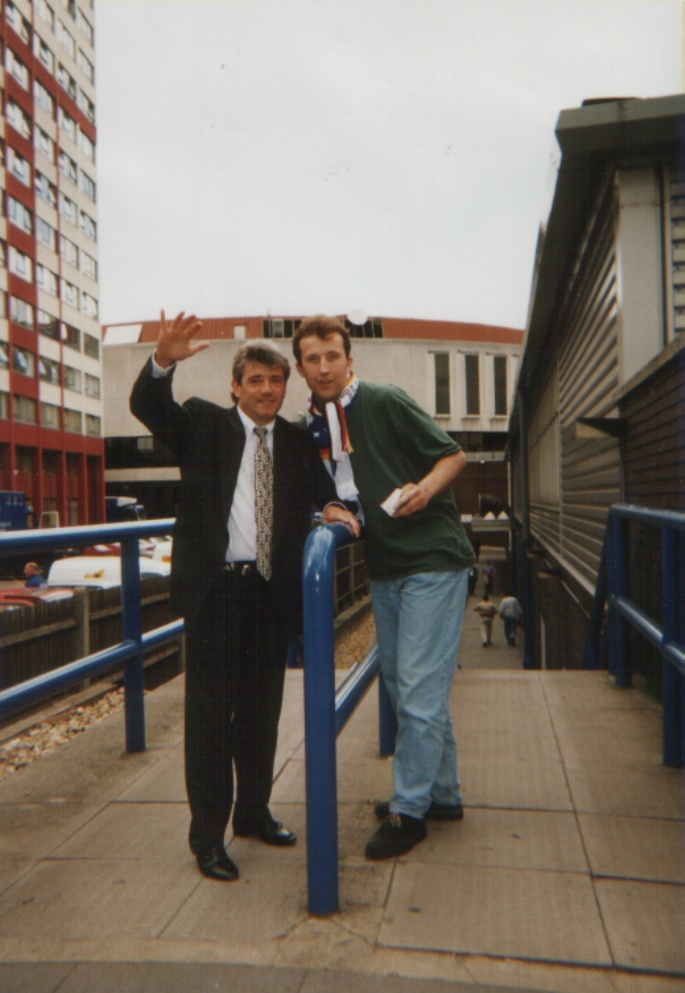
Keegan with a Hamburger SV supporter in London in 1996

Keegan's transfer to Hamburger SV was agreed between the FA Cup final and the European Cup final of 1977, although Keegan had negotiated a maximum transfer fee the season before. The agreement set the British record transfer fee at £500,000, and nearly doubled the German transfer record. Keegan arrived in Germany, joining a club that had not finished higher than sixth in two decades. He told ITV's Brian Moore that his annual salary the last season he played for Liverpool was £22,000, whereas at Hamburg it was £122,000.

Following his move to Hamburg, Keegan became an early trendsetter with his new haircut, a perm. On first sight, his wife thought it was hilarious and his agent jokingly tried to disown him in public. Soon though, players such as Bryan Robson, Charlie George, Phil Neal, Terry McDermott also had perms. Later, when Keegan was at Newcastle United as a manager, he and McDermott would joke about the perm in an advertisement. Keegan became Hamburg's best-paid player and was billed by the club's business manager, Dr. Peter Krohn, as the superstar signing from England who would transform an average German team. Keegan did not feel immediately accepted by his new teammates, and perceived slights from teammates that supported this idea, like making an open run in training but not receiving a pass.

Rules stated that no club was allowed more than two foreign players on its squad. Unbeknownst to Keegan, his transfer had indirectly moved out the three-time European Cup winner Horst Blankenburg. Blankenburg was a very popular member of the squad, and this upset some players. There was also some resentment among the other players who thought that the previous coach, whom the players liked, was replaced by Krohn to accommodate Keegan. It was not until Keegan had moved out of temporary accommodation and moved to a bungalow in the little village of Itzstedt that Keegan began to feel he could make inroads and have a successful career and life in Germany.

In one early interview, Keegan mentioned how he was settling in, he explained how he missed British cereals that he could not find in the supermarkets in Germany. The Hamburg supporters then flooded him with parcels of his favourite cereal with lists of the suppliers. There were language difficulties early on. In one instance in the summer, Keegan went into a hardware shop intending to buy a fuse and he eventually left the shop after buying Christmas lights.

He scored in pre-season friendlies against Barcelona and his former club Liverpool, but Hamburg would later suffer defeat in the European Super Cup final against the latter opposition. Keegan's time in Hamburg got off to a bad start as Hamburg lost 5–2 to MSV Duisburg in their first league match. Rudi Gutendorf, the manager some believed was appointed for Keegan, would only last until October.

In the winter break of his first season, feeling isolated by the clique in the dressing room, a frustrated Keegan was sent off in a friendly against lower league club VfB Lübeck. A player in the match was targeting Keegan, and after the third time being smashed, Keegan walked to the goading Lübeck player and punched him. Keegan, who knew he was going to be sent off, walked off the pitch prior to any decision by the referee. Keegan maintains this was his lowest point in Germany. After the incident, he decided to master the German language to fully integrate himself in the team. Up to that point he did not have the language to ask teammates why they were not passing to him, nor to show them that he too loved the club.

Keegan was suspended for eight weeks and in that time he and the squad made efforts to integrate. He knew the dressing room was turning in his favour when he was invited to the squad nights out. Eventually, one player told him he could get cheap meat for Keegan's dogs, and full-back Peter Hidien even got a perm. An unhappy first few months at the club gave way to a more successful season. Although the club finished tenth in the league in the 1977–78 season, Keegan's 12 goals helped him pick up a personal honour, the France Football European Footballer of the Year award for 1978.

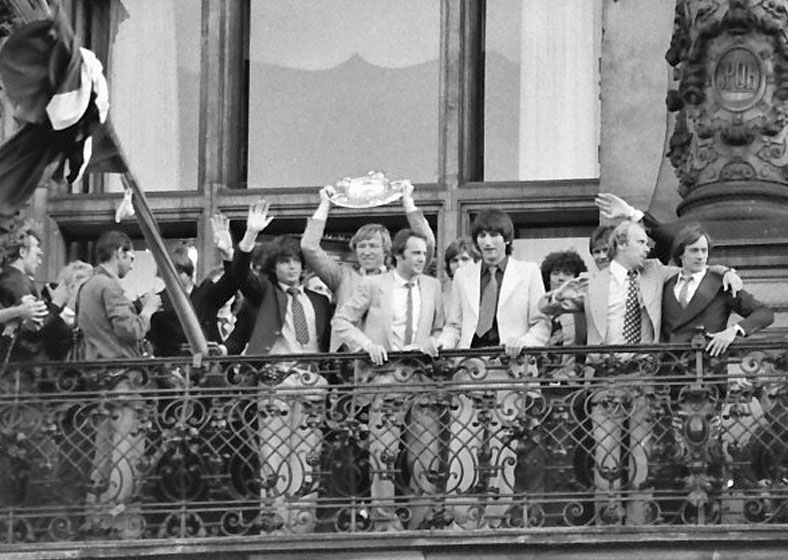
Keegan (fourth from the right) celebrating the Bundesliga title win with Hamburg in 1979

Hamburg appointed Croatian Branko Zebec as a new coach. Zebec was a man who was known to work players intensely. His squad did a lot of running, and Keegan claimed he had never been worked as hard in his life. The 1978–79 season saw a vast improvement on the club's 1978 finish. A rigorous training regime, Keegan's increasing grasp of the German language, and the newly imposed discipline contributed to Hamburg's first league championship in nineteen years. The club's success also translated into individual recognition for Keegan, who picked up the European Footballer of the Year award for a second consecutive season. Before Keegan, only Alfredo di Stéfano, Franz Beckenbauer and Johan Cruyff had won the award two or more times. As of 2023, six more players have won the award multiple times, bringing the total to ten.

After the 1978–79 season, Juventus, Real Madrid and the Washington Diplomats tried to sign Keegan by offering good terms, but he decided to see out his contract at Hamburg. In 1979, Hamburg supporters gave Keegan the nickname "Mighty Mouse" from the popular cartoon superhero from the 1970s and 1980s.

In February 1980, Keegan announced he was leaving after his contract expired. One of the reasons for leaving was Zebec's training regime. Keegan had a lot of respect for Zebec, but thought that Zebec's extreme fitness regime was flawed for the modern-day footballer. Keegan told Zebec that his training regime was going to burn him out as a footballer, and that he believed he would be finished from playing by 30 if he continued. Zebec, in turn responded to Keegan's critique and explained to Keegan it was the same for all the players. Keegan then implied to Zebec that players have different roles and not all players run the same distances on match days; he pointed out to Zebec that because of his role and his effort, on match days not many players in the squad ran as much as himself. After he left the club, drawings were found in Keegan's training ground locker depicting Zebec treating the squad as prisoners, with a figure of Keegan counting down the days to his release. The drawings and Keegan's personal locker are now held in the Hamburg Museum, under the title "HSV Legenden".

Hamburg's European campaign of 1979–80 saw Keegan score two goals to help Hamburg past Dinamo Tbilisi, the Soviet champions who had beaten Liverpool to advance. On the run Hamburg beat Dinamo Tbilisi, Valur, Hajduk Split and Real Madrid. In the first leg against Madrid, they were comfortably beaten 2–0 and most football pundits predicted Hamburg were probably going out. Hamburg beat the odds by winning the return leg 5–1. Keegan regarded this as one of the most outstanding team performances he had the fortune to be a part of. In the final, they played Nottingham Forest. Forest won the game 1–0 with a goal from John Robertson. This cup final defeat was coupled domestically with losing the Bundesliga title to Bayern Munich. Having negotiated a maximum transfer fee of £500,000 in his contract the year before and agreeing to a move in February, Keegan left Hamburg for Southampton in the summer of 1980. In 90 Bundesliga games he scored 32 goals.

=== 1980–1982: Southampton ===
On 11 February 1980, Southampton boss Lawrie McMenemy called a press conference at the Potters Heron Hotel in Ampfield to announce that Keegan would join the Saints in the summer. The news caused surprise throughout the world of football and around the city of Southampton, as they were a relatively small club. The club was beginning to become established in the top division, but this signing showed how persuasive their manager could be.

Keegan had a clause in his contract with Hamburg that gave Liverpool the option to buy him back. Liverpool, however, opted not to exercise this clause. As late as November 2011, Keegan stated, "I was with Lawrie [McMenemy] at a charity event the other day, and he said he phoned up Peter Robinson because he wanted me, but Liverpool had a clause. Peter said, 'No, we won't be signing him, definitely, we don't need him.'" Southampton snapped him up for £420,000, and Keegan made his Southampton debut at Lansdowne Road in a pre-season friendly against Shamrock Rovers on 23 July 1980.

Keegan's two seasons at The Dell saw him as part of a flamboyant team also containing Alan Ball, Phil Boyer, Mick Channon and Charlie George. In 1980–81, the Saints scored 76 goals, finishing in sixth place, their highest league finish to that point.

In the following season, Keegan played some of his best football, and at the beginning of April 1982, Southampton sat at the top of the First Division table. They managed only three wins after February, however, leading to a seventh-place finish, 21 points off first place. Despite this, Keegan was voted the PFA Player of the Year and awarded the OBE for services to Association Football. Keegan had scored 26 of the team's 72 league goals and was voted the club's Player of the Season by the Southern Daily Echo. This second season was the most prolific of his career, scoring 30 goals in all competitions and winning the golden boot.

Keegan fell out with McMenemy over the manager's failure to strengthen Southampton's defence (which conceded 67 goals in the 1981–82 season) while the team was at the top of the table. There were also rumours that McMenemy had accused the whole team of cheating after a 3–0 defeat by Aston Villa in April 1982, to which Keegan took great exception. Although Keegan joined the Saints' next pre–season tour, he had already decided to move. In 2019, McMenemy explained that prior to the start of the 1982–83 season, Keegan believed that Southampton did not match his footballing ambitions, he had made up his mind and demanded to leave, and there was nothing the club could do about it. A few days before the start of the season, he signed for Newcastle United for a fee of £100,000.

=== 1982–1984: Newcastle United ===
Keegan joined Newcastle United and spent two seasons there, during which time he was extremely popular with the supporters. The press conference to announce his signing was held in the Gosforth Park Hotel. Reacting to the two-time Ballon d'Or winner joining a Second Division team, a local newspaper's main headline was simply, "Here he is!"

External videos
- Keegan on his Newcastle debut. Interview with Steve Harmison

Keegan always felt at one stage in his career he would play for Newcastle. As a child, Keegan's father would tell him football stories about Hughie Gallacher and Jackie Milburn. Jackie Milburn became a football journalist after his playing days and Keegan's father sent Milburn letters expressing how well Keegan was playing. Keegan claimed that his father would have loved to have seen him playing football in black and white stripes, and to Keegan, playing for Newcastle felt like coming home. There was euphoria in Newcastle at the signing of Keegan and he felt he was there to help the supporters to start believing in themselves. Keegan had never experienced that kind of deification before. He explained, no one could have made him more welcome. People had warned Keegan that whatever he was thinking his welcome would be like, it would not be enough. To Keegan, who had played in a European Cup final, Wembley and Hamburg, the atmosphere on his debut was unique, explaining that the noise on his debut came from all sides of the ground like a surround sound system. He made his debut and scored his first goal against Queens Park Rangers. After scoring, Keegan did something he had never done before – he instinctively and famously threw himself into the crowd to show the supporters he was one of them. He explained to the press afterwards that "I just wanted to stay there for ever..." Keegan had a fear of letting the supporters down, constantly telling himself, "You can't let them down."

Keegan, along with Terry McDermott, Jeff Clarke and David McCreery, now had senior status at the club. Newcastle manager, Arthur Cox, who would later join many of Keegan's coaching staffs, had a different relationship to Keegan than with other players. Cox would ask Keegan his opinion on players. To Keegan, Cox was a task master with a good sense of humour. Cox would condition the players like commandos by having Keegan and his teammates run up and down the hills in Gateshead. In his first season, Newcastle finished fifth, which Keegan maintained was a "flattering" league position, after a faltering season. He finished the season with 21 goals in 37 appearances and won North East Player of the Year.

In September 1983, Keegan answered a phone call at 1:00 a.m. from Cox. In the phone call Cox explained to Keegan that he had signed Peter Beardsley from the Vancouver Whitecaps and suggested that Keegan would like him. A few days later, Keegan met Beardsley at Benwell. Keegan and his teammates thought Beardsley was "just a lad who had won a competition" to train with the first team. It was only when they saw him in action that they knew he had something about him. At Beardsley's first training session Keegan could not believe his eyes. Keegan once stated about Beardsley, "At Scunthorpe I always thought Terry Heath had the wow factor, because of his skill on the ball, and when I moved to Liverpool I had never seen anyone with Peter Thompson's ability. By the time I started playing for Newcastle, however, I had played against Cruyff, Maradona and Pelé, and yet I have never had my mind blown as I did on the first day I saw Peter Beardsley."

Keegan announced his retirement prior to the end of the 1983–84 season, on 14 February 1984 – his 33rd birthday. Keegan felt his career was finished after a cup game, a month prior, away at Liverpool. In this match, Keegan was put through on goal from a pass that left him one-on-one with the goalkeeper, Bruce Grobbelaar. He thought this was his moment to put Newcastle 1–0 up in front of the thousands of supporters behind the goal. Before he could finish his move and put the goal away, Keegan was intercepted by the recovering Mark Lawrenson. As Keegan was moving towards goal with his pace, Lawrenson caught up to him and stole the ball off him from the side. At this precise moment, it occurred to Keegan he had now lost his pace. At the end of the game, a frustrated Keegan, while clapping off the supporters, decided this would be his last season as a footballer.

'I was the mongrel who made it to Crufts, and that was fine by me...'

— Keegan, on his football career.

Keegan felt if he were to extend his career at Newcastle in the First Division, he would have to adjust his game and move from the attacking role on which he built his footballing identity. Keegan did not want to move back into midfield, and instead decided to retire on a high note.

Keegan's last league game was against Brighton & Hove Albion, scoring in a 3–1 victory. He played 78 times in his Newcastle career, scoring 48 goals and helping promote them from the Second Division in 1984. His final appearance for Newcastle came in a friendly against Liverpool some days later, leaving the pitch in a helicopter while still dressed in his kit. Thirteen-year-old Alan Shearer, whom Keegan would later sign while manager of Newcastle, was a ball boy at Keegan's testimonial.

=== 1985: Blacktown City ===
In April 1985, Keegan briefly came out of retirement to play a two-game stint as a guest player for Blacktown City in Australia's National Soccer League. He scored on his debut in a 3–2 loss to Canberra City.

== International career ==
During 1972, Keegan made five appearances for the England under-23 team, with his only goal coming in a friendly match against East Germany. That same match also saw Keegan receive his only red card at international level.

Keegan made his England debut on 15 November 1972 in a 1–0 World Cup qualifying win over Wales. Keegan managed only two appearances during this campaign, both against Wales, as England failed to qualify for the 1974 FIFA World Cup. He scored his first international goal in his third appearance, also against Wales, on 11 May 1974. He was given the captaincy by manager Don Revie in 1976 after Gerry Francis fell victim to a long-term injury. He went on to captain England 31 times, retaining the captain's armband until his international retirement after the 1982 World Cup.

Keegan captained England at Euro 1980. England failed to progress from the group stage after finishing third in their group behind Italy and Belgium.

He managed only one World Cup appearance, as England failed to qualify for both the 1974 and 1978 tournaments. He finally reached the World Cup in 1982, held in Spain. He was named in the squad for the tournament, but was suffering from a chronic back injury and was unfit to play in any of England's group games. In a last desperate effort to play in a World Cup – knowing that he would not be around for the 1986 competition – he secretly hired a car and drove from Spain to a specialist he knew in Germany for intensive treatment. He recovered sufficiently to appear as a substitute for the last 26 minutes of England's second-round game against Spain. While on the pitch, he missed a point-blank header which would have put England ahead. England needed to win by a scoreline better than 2–1 to progress to the semi-finals (a 2–1 victory would have left them tied with West Germany). England drew the game 0–0 and were eliminated from the competition.

Following the successful start to the 1982–83 season with Newcastle United, there was much controversy when newly appointed England manager Bobby Robson did not select Keegan for his first squad, a decision Keegan learned of from the media rather than Robson himself. Keegan publicly expressed his displeasure at not being given the courtesy of a phone call from Robson, and never played for his country again. He finished his international career with 63 caps and 21 goals.

== Managerial career ==
=== Newcastle United ===
On 5 February 1992, almost eight years after his final game as a player, Keegan returned to Newcastle United as manager. The club had been relegated from the top flight in 1989 and narrowly missed out on promotion in 1990 after losing in the playoffs to arch-rivals Sunderland. In 1991, they failed to make the playoffs and occupied last place in the Second Division at several stages. Following the dismissal of previous manager Ossie Ardiles, Keegan was appointed to prevent Newcastle from being relegated to the third tier for the first time in the club's history. The club was suffering from internal struggles and boardroom battles which were holding them back. After three or more years trying, John Hall had recently won the board room from the old regime. Though Hall was not yet confirmed as the chairman, he had accrued enough power to make the key decisions. Hall told board members one hour before Keegan's first press conference that he would be the manager. Keegan had watched only two live matches in seven years. One was the European Cup final in 1991, the other being a goalless draw between Newcastle and Blackburn Rovers; as such, it was suggested that Keegan was unprepared and inexperienced.

When Keegan turned up to Benwell for his first training session as manager, he noted the training ground was in a mess. He was surprised at the neglect of the facilities. The training ground was in the process of being sold; despite this, Keegan paid for the clean-up of the grounds with his own money, with the cleaning work being done in one weekend. Keegan felt this clean-up work was an important move and an indirect message to the players that their professionalism had to be high.

Assessing the squad, Keegan felt the team was not good enough to reach the level at which he and Terry McDermott once played. In five-a-sides he and McDermott, both in their 40s with a lack of conditioning, believed they were two of the best players. Keegan noted the club had an impressive crop of youth players. This crop included: Lee Clark, Steve Watson, Steve Howey, Alan Thompson and Robbie Elliott. These young players would form the core of Keegan's Newcastle squads from 1992 to 1997. Keegan noted Watson would take throw-ins via a somersault throw and this amused and shocked him. He regarded it as a gimmick and could not believe the club's supporters would take joy in it. The throw-in, to Keegan, was a sign of how far Newcastle had fallen. He wanted the club to be known for scoring goals and thrilling football. Prior to his first game, Keegan made his first tough call with his squad of players when he dropped Clark. Though he liked Clark's spirit, Keegan believed he was at risk of being sent off. Prior to the game, Keegan arranged a training match for the reserves and included himself to make up the numbers. In the training match, a frustrated Clark went through the back of Keegan in a knee-high tackle on a hospital pass, in a similar way to a Romeo Benetti tackle on Keegan in an England–Italy match. A melee ensued, resulting in Pavel Srníček swinging a roundhouse kick at Clark's head. Keegan was not upset and he did not punish either player. To Keegan, Srníček and Clark's response showed they cared about their football. Keegan's first game, against Bristol City, ended in 3–0 victory in front of a capacity crowd.

On 14 March 1992, following a 3–1 win over Swindon Town, Keegan became frustrated with Hall. Keegan had been not given the transfer funds he was promised. As a result of this frustration, Keegan briefly walked out on the team. This resulted in a phone call between Keegan and Hall, where they settled their differences, and where Hall guaranteed millions of pounds to spend on new players. Further assessing his squad, Keegan noted some players could not handle the pressure and would sneak in by a turnstile rather than meet and greet the big crowds at the front entrance prior to games. Keegan decided to move these players on. With the club's transfer funds Keegan decided he needed a leader in the team. Keegan signed the experienced Brian Kilcline. Keegan stated about Kilcline, "Even on his bad days his head never dropped, he was tough as teak, absolutely fearless", and "He was a ready-made captain, one of my more important signings as Newcastle's manager." Keegan's managerial guidance in the 1991–92 season helped Newcastle finish 20th out of 24 teams in the Second Division, avoiding relegation. This meant, with the establishment of the new Premier League, the team would play in the new First Division for the 1992–93 season.

Prior to the 1992–93 season, Keegan strengthened the defence with the acquisition of Barry Venison from Liverpool and John Beresford from Portsmouth. Newcastle began the season with 11 successive wins and led the league virtually all season. The club-record signing of Bristol City striker Andy Cole in February further strengthened their side; Cole netted 12 goals in his first 12 games for the club. The addition of Charlton Athletic's Rob Lee bolstered the midfield in the autumn. Newcastle finished first in the First Division, eight points clear of second-place West Ham United, and were promoted to the Premier League as First Division champions. Top scorer David Kelly and influential midfielder Gavin Peacock were both sold after the season, and Keegan brought striker Peter Beardsley back to Newcastle from Everton, six years after he had been sold by Newcastle to Liverpool.

The 1993–94 season was an enormous success for Newcastle as they finished third in the Premier League and qualified for the UEFA Cup, bringing European football to the club for the first time since 1977. Cole was the Premier League's top scorer with 34 goals in 40 games, and he set a club record with a total of 41 goals in all competitions. Keegan then strengthened his side by signing Swiss defender Marc Hottiger, Belgian defensive midfielder Philippe Albert, and Norwich City's quick winger, Ruel Fox.

Newcastle won their first six games of the 1994–95 season to top the league and they appeared capable of winning their first league title since 1927. The shock departure of Cole to Manchester United in January weakened their attack, and they finished the season in sixth place – not enough for another UEFA Cup campaign. In the meantime, autumn signing Paul Kitson was partnered with Beardsley in attack. Keegan made several important additions to the Newcastle side in the summer of 1995: Reading goalkeeper Shaka Hislop, Paris Saint-Germain's French winger David Ginola, Queens Park Rangers striker Les Ferdinand, and Wimbledon defender Warren Barton. Ferdinand was Newcastle's biggest signing at £6 million, while the £4 million paid for Barton was the highest fee paid for a defender in English football at the time.

Newcastle excelled in the first half of the 1995–96 season, leading the league by ten points on 23 December 1995 and holding a 12-point lead from early in January to 4 February. After a 2–0 defeat at West Ham on 21 February, the lead was cut to nine points. A 1–0 defeat at the hands of fellow title-challengers Manchester United cut the gap to a single point on 4 March. Within two weeks, Newcastle's lead evaporated and they were unable to recover it. On 3 April, Newcastle's 4–3 defeat to Liverpool at Anfield, which ended with Keegan slumped over the advertising hoarding following Stan Collymore's late winner for Liverpool, is widely considered to be a classic Premier League match. With two games remaining, Newcastle and Manchester United both had 76 points. Newcastle managed a 1–1 draw against Nottingham Forest on 2 May, and another 1–1 draw against Tottenham Hotspur on the final day of the season. The title was won by Manchester United, whose 3–0 triumph at Middlesbrough would have been enough to win, regardless of Newcastle's result against Tottenham. Keegan stated in 2018 that if Newcastle had won the title in that season, the squad, which included players such as Ferdinand, Ginola, Beardsley, Lee, Darren Peacock, and Faustino Asprilla would have stayed together, built up momentum, and won more trophies.

During the race for the 1995–96 title, Keegan directed remarks at the Manchester United manager, Alex Ferguson, during a post-match interview live on Sky Sports. His outburst – "I would love it if we beat them! Love it!" – is frequently referred to when describing their relationship. In April 2003, it was named as Quote of the Decade in the Premier League 10 Seasons Awards and Most Memorable Quote in the 20 Seasons Awards in May 2012. It also appeared at number 17 in Channel 4's 100 Greatest Sporting Moments.

Keegan then broke the world transfer fee record by signing striker Alan Shearer from Blackburn in July 1996. Shearer, who had been the Premier League's top scorer the last two seasons, was born in Newcastle and had grown up as a fan of the club. He made an instant impact on his native Tyneside. The club lost in his debut, a 4–0 Charity Shield defeat at the hands of Manchester United, but redeemed themselves two months later with a 5–0 victory against the same opposition, in which Shearer scored. Newcastle briefly led the league at several stages in the first half of the season, and Shearer led the league scoring 25 goals.

On 8 January 1997, Keegan announced his resignation as manager. A club statement following his resignation read:

Newcastle United Football Club today announce the resignation of manager Kevin Keegan. Kevin informed the board of his wish to resign at the end of the season, having decided he no longer wishes to continue in football management at this stage in his life. Following lengthy discussions of which the board attempted to persuade Kevin to change his mind, both parties eventually agreed that the best route forward was for the club to, reluctantly, accept his resignation with immediate effect.

Keegan left the club with a short statement reading:

It was my decision and my decision alone to resign. I feel I have taken the club as far as I can, and that it would be in the best interests of all concerned if I resigned now. I wish the club and everyone concerned with it all the best for the future.

On the Newcastle United DVD Magpie Magic, it is said that chairman John Hall asked for a long-term commitment as manager from him, which Keegan was unwilling to give. It also states that the pressure and criticism of selling Cole, and the failed title challenge in the 1995–96 season, took a toll on him.

He was succeeded by Kenny Dalglish, the same man who had replaced him as a player at Liverpool twenty years earlier. Newcastle finished second place that season but 13th the following season, although they were FA Cup runners-up. They did not return to the top five of the Premier League until the 2001–02 season, when they finished fourth under Bobby Robson.

It was during his time as coach that Keegan gained the nickname "King Kev" from Newcastle supporters.

=== Fulham ===
Keegan returned to football on 25 September 1997 as chief operating officer at Second Division Fulham, with Ray Wilkins as head coach. Fulham finished sixth in the final table, but Wilkins was sacked just before the first leg of the playoff semi-final and Keegan took over as manager.

His appointment came a few months after the takeover of the club by Harrods owner Mohamed Al-Fayed, who gave Keegan £10 million to spend on players that season. That was the first part of a £40 million attempt to deliver Premier League football to the Craven Cottage club, who had been outside the top flight since 1968, and had not played in the league's second tier since 1986.

Keegan was unable to inspire Fulham to overcome Grimsby Town in the playoffs, but good form in the 1998–99 season – helped by the acquisition of players who would normally have signed with Premier League or First Division clubs – clinched them the Second Division title and promotion to First Division. Keegan left at the end of the season to concentrate on his duties as England manager, having succeeded Glenn Hoddle in February 1999.

Fulham replaced Keegan with Paul Bracewell and reached the Premier League two years later under Bracewell's successor, Jean Tigana. The squad still featured many of the players bought by Keegan or Wilkins.

=== England ===
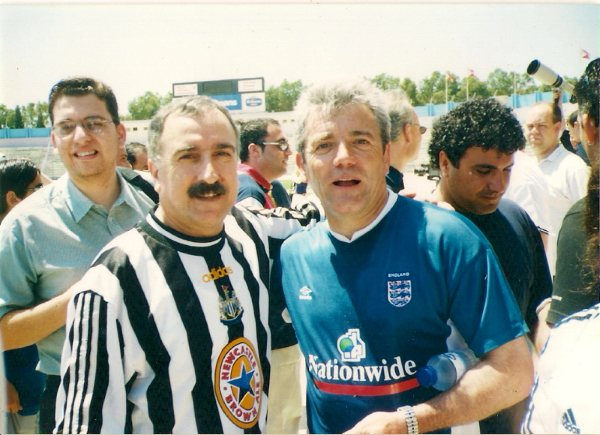
Keegan as England manager with a Newcastle United supporter in Malta

After weeks of speculation, Keegan was named as the new England manager on 18 February 1999. He succeeded Glenn Hoddle, who had been sacked two weeks earlier for a newspaper interview in which he suggested that disabled people were being punished for their sins in a previous life. Keegan led the team to a winning start with 3–1 victory over Poland to reignite England's campaign to qualify for Euro 2000 in Group 5 following a slow start to the qualifiers. Points dropped in draws against Sweden, Bulgaria, and the return fixture against Poland left England facing elimination as the end of the qualifying stages neared. Poland lost their last match to Sweden, and England finished second in the group to gain a place in the qualification playoff with Scotland. Two goals from Paul Scholes gave them a 2–0 win in the first leg, and despite a 1–0 defeat in the second leg, they qualified for the championships for the fourth straight tournament.

This success brought goodwill, but Keegan began to come under fire for his perceived tactical naivety. This came to a head during the unsuccessful Euro 2000 tournament. England began with a 3–2 defeat against Portugal, despite having a 2–0 lead after 17 minutes. England beat Germany 1-0 in their next game, the first English victory over Germany in a competitive match since the 1966 World Cup final. In the final group game against Romania, England once again lost 3–2, this time after taking a 2–1 lead, and their hopes of reaching the quarter-finals were over. Despite this disappointment, Keegan remained in charge of the national side.

Keegan resigned as England manager on 7 October 2000. This came after England lost to Germany in their first 2002 World Cup qualifier, the last game played at Wembley Stadium before it was rebuilt. Keegan won only 38.9% of his games in charge, the lowest such percentage of any permanent England manager – although unlike Don Revie (1974–1977) or Steve McClaren (2006–2007), Keegan achieved qualification to a major tournament for England.

When Sven-Göran Eriksson became England manager, he appointed the 64-year-old Tord Grip as his assistant. This caused Keegan to complain that when he was England manager, the FA had told him that he could not have Arthur Cox as his assistant because at 60, Cox was too old for the role, although he was allowed a lesser role on the coaching staff. Keegan went on, "I wasn't allowed to bring in the people I wanted and that was wrong. Mr. Eriksson was and I'm delighted for him because that's the way it should be."

=== Manchester City ===
On 24 May 2001, Keegan returned to football as successor to Joe Royle at Manchester City, who had just been relegated from the Premier League. Keegan signed experienced international players such as Stuart Pearce, Eyal Berkovic and Ali Benarbia. That season, City were promoted as First Division champions after scoring 108 league goals. Keegan was the first manager in the Premier League era to win the First Division title with two different clubs.

In preparation for his second season as manager (2002–03), he signed Nicolas Anelka, Peter Schmeichel and Marc-Vivien Foé. That season saw mixed results. City beat Liverpool at Anfield and took four points from Manchester United with their first win in the Manchester derby since September 1989), but conceded five goals away to Chelsea and again at home to Arsenal. They secured their Premier League status comfortably by finishing ninth. Keegan also guided City into the UEFA Cup, qualifying via the UEFA Fair Play ranking.

For the 2003–04 season, the club's first season at the new City of Manchester Stadium, Keegan added Steve McManaman, Paul Bosvelt, David Seaman and Michael Tarnat to City's squad. City started well and were fifth in the league by the start of November. However, a draw at home to Polish minnows Groclin led to their second round elimination from the UEFA Cup, which was followed by a slump in form. City did not win again in the league until 21 February, and finished 16th in the league. The most notable match of the season came at Tottenham Hotspur in the FA Cup on 4 February 2004. Despite being down 3–0 at halftime (with ten men after Joey Barton was sent off), City came back to win 4–3.

The 2004–05 season brought better form for City, but Keegan agreed to leave as manager on 10 March 2005 after telling the chairman his desire to retire from football at the end of the season. The club went on to finish eighth under his successor Stuart Pearce, and only missed out on a UEFA Cup place when Robbie Fowler missed a penalty in stoppage time of a 1–1 draw with Middlesbrough on the last day of the season. Earlier that season, while still under Keegan's management, City beat Chelsea 1–0 which turned out to be the only defeat in the league that season for Chelsea, who ended up as Premier League champions.

After declaring his retirement from football in 2005, Keegan remained out of the media spotlight, working at the Soccer Circus football school in Glasgow. In October 2007, he indicated he was unlikely to manage again.

=== Return to Newcastle ===
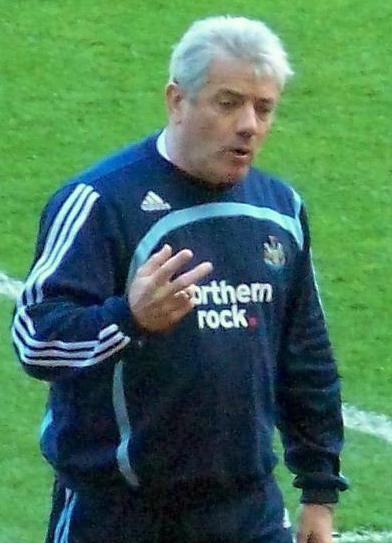
Keegan managing Newcastle United in 2008

Following the dismissal of manager Sam Allardyce, Keegan made an unexpected return to Newcastle United on 16 January 2008. Newcastle supporters welcomed the manager back as he arrived to see the FA Cup third round replay against Stoke City, alongside owner Mike Ashley and chairman Chris Mort. He managed his first game at the club since 1997 against Bolton Wanderers on 19 January. He awarded the club captaincy to Michael Owen, stating, "He's not scared to give his opinion when he's right, and he's not scared to say what he feels. He's a tremendous professional, and he trains properly every day." Keegan announced on 22 January that he and Alan Shearer held talks about the two linking up, with Shearer as his assistant, but decided against the idea, leaving the door open for Shearer to take other roles.

Keegan failed to win any of his first eight games back at Newcastle. On 22 March, Newcastle earned the first win of Keegan's second managerial spell, a 2–0 victory against his former club, Fulham. The team followed it up with wins over Tottenham Hotspur and Sunderland, maintaining his perfect record over the club's local rivals in the Tyne-Wear derby, and also putting Newcastle on top of the league's form chart. This run of good form was hugely thanks to a new 4–3–3 formation, spearheaded by the productive strike trio of Owen, Obafemi Martins and Mark Viduka. The trio scored 11 of the club's 14 goals in this run, which safely secured the club from a relegation battle. Newcastle's seven-game unbeaten run came to an end in a home defeat to Chelsea, and they finished the season in 12th place.

That summer, Newcastle signed Argentine winger Jonás Gutiérrez, as well as his countryman, defender Fabricio Coloccini from Deportivo de La Coruña, among others. Newcastle began the 2008–09 season with a 1–1 draw against Manchester United at Old Trafford, having lost the previous season's fixtures 6–0 and 5–1. They beat Bolton 1–0 the following week, and Coventry City 3–2 in the second round of the League Cup on 26 August.

==== Resignation ====
As the 2007–08 season drew to a close, rumours of tensions between the club's directors and Keegan began to surface, as he publicly criticised the board, claiming they were not providing him the financial support necessary to break into the top four of the Premier League standings. His accusations caused bad press for owner Mike Ashley, who was already battling reports that he had lost hundreds of millions of pounds in a disastrous stock market venture.

Following the closure of the transfer window at midnight on 1 September 2008, various media sources reported that Keegan had either resigned from the club or had been sacked, leading to fan protests around St James' Park. The club released statements denying that Keegan had left, but stated that talks were ongoing between the manager and members of the board. On 4 September, Keegan issued a statement confirming that he had resigned the same day, stating that, "A manager must have the right to manage and that clubs should not impose upon any manager any player that he does not want." Late on 12 September, it was reported Keegan met Ashley in London in an attempt to resolve their differences, but the meeting ended without a satisfactory conclusion for either party.

Richard Bevan, chief executive of the League Managers Association (LMA), stated the following month that Keegan would consider a return to the club but only if those who held the ownership were willing to develop a structure which he was happy with. The club was also warned by the LMA on 5 September to develop a structure which would satisfy the next manager to replace Keegan to avoid a similar situation repeating itself and damaging the club's image. Following Dennis Wise's resignation as director of football in April 2009, many supporters directed the blame for Keegan's exit at both Wise and Ashley, as a result of such a position being established and poorly used.

==== Premier League Arbitration Panel ====
In December 2008, it was reported that, following Mike Ashley's decision to withdraw the sale of Newcastle, a legal dispute over Keegan's departure had arisen; Keegan claimed unfair dismissal and Ashley claimed damage to his public image. In September 2009, it was reported that Keegan had met with Ashley and the Newcastle board – including former members – in a Premier League arbitration hearing for a claim of £10 million in compensation for his shock resignation. All sides agreed to the arbitration being held publicly.

Keegan's dispute with the club was resolved in October 2009. The tribunal ruled in favour of Keegan, agreeing that Newcastle had constructively dismissed him by insisting on the signing of midfielder Nacho González on loan, against his wishes. The move was made to replace James Milner following his move to Aston Villa, after a bid for Bayern Munich's Bastian Schweinsteiger was rejected. Although Wise's signing of Spanish striker Xisco was not mentioned in the hearing, Keegan stated that this had also been a central factor in his departure.

The ruling was based around seven issues. The panel declared that Keegan had been led to believe he had the final decision on player transfers, and was never explicitly told in writing, his contract, nor by word of mouth that he did not, nor that his role would see him report to others. Given the generally understood role of a Premier League manager, the panel agreed he could reasonably expect that this was not a factor. The club's signing of González meant that they had violated his employment contract, which amounted to constructive dismissal. While González was the main issue in the decision, the club's alleged mistreatment of Keegan, claiming they were in a position to sack him should he not agree to the terms they offered, as well as his decision to remain at the club until 4 September instead of resigning on 1 September, allowing the club to reach a compromise, led to the ruling in Keegan's favour. Keegan was awarded £2 million (plus interest accrued) according to severance clauses in his contract. Claims for more were turned down on the basis that the standard contract severance clauses covered constructive dismissal. Keegan stated afterwards that the purpose of his claim had been to restore his reputation, and was delighted with the outcome, allowing him to move forward.

In pursuit of winning the tribunal, the club admitted to misleading the media and their supporters. Several key senior staff, including Dennis Wise and Derek Llambias, had publicly claimed that Keegan had "the final word"; they claimed to the tribunal that this was not in fact the case and that their claims were just "PR". It was then revealed that Wise asked Keegan to sign González after watching him "on YouTube". On 21 October, a subsequent meeting of the same panel found that the club should pay all legal and associated costs incurred by Keegan as a result of the tribunal. They reached this conclusion based on their view that the club's "defence on the primary liability issue was, in our view, wholly without merit".

Keegan stated after the hearing he still wanted to manage top flight football, and would consider returning to his position at the club, but felt the supporters may be exhausted from his last tenure and would prefer him not to. In June 2013, Keegan stated he would only consider a return should Ashley leave the club. Over the years, Keegan continued to criticise Ashley, accusing him of a lack of respect for the supporters. Following the sale of Newcastle United to the Public Investment Fund in 2021, Keegan spoke publicly at an event in Cramlington, stating his delight at Ashley's departure and excitement at the new ownership's ability to compete financially with the wealthiest football clubs in the world.

== Media appearances ==
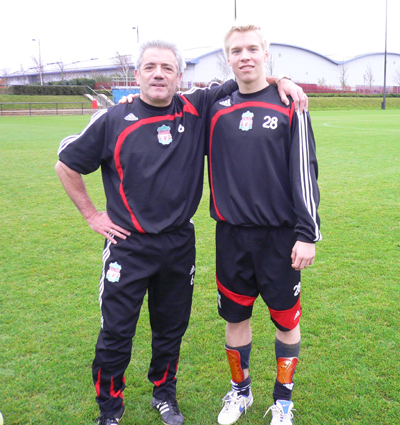
Keegan and Liverpool reserves striker Lauri Dalla Valle in 2007

In 1976, Keegan competed on BBC's television programme Superstars. Despite suffering severe cuts after crashing his bicycle, he insisted on re-racing and secured second place in the event, before going on to win that edition of the programme. He also advertised Brut aftershave alongside boxer Henry Cooper.

In 1979, Keegan and his wife were featured on ITV's Brian Moore meets Kevin Keegan, a documentary filmed over the course of the season. Cameras documented activities at the family's Hamburg home and Keegan's personal business appearances. The same year, during his daughter's christening reception at a London hotel, Eamonn Andrews, the presenter of This Is Your Life, emerged from a giant cake to surprise Keegan and his guests with his famous big red book. The television show was broadcast on Keegan's 28th birthday, ten days later. Keegan quipped, "I'm so glad that I wore brown trousers."

He narrated the 90-minute documentary Keegan on Keegan, released via Castle Vision on VHS cassette in 1992.

In 1993, a football manager video game featuring Keegan was released for the Super Nintendo Entertainment System, Kevin Keegan's Player Manager.

In 1999, Zig Zag Productions produced the documentary Football Stories: Kevin Keegan, which was broadcast on Channel 5 under the title Kevin Keegan - Football Messiah?. The documentary explored Keegan's career as both a player and manager, from his rise at Liverpool and Hamburg to his managerial achievements with Newcastle United and England.

In August 2009, nearly a year after his departure from Newcastle, Keegan was confirmed as the lead pundit on ESPN UK. During the course of the 2010 World Cup, Keegan featured as a pundit for ITV. He was part of ESPN's live coverage of the 2011, 2012 and 2013 FA Cup finals, with pitchside build-up and post-match commentary.

=== Music ===
Keegan released a single in 1972 titled "It Ain't Easy". His song "Head Over Heels in Love", written by Chris Norman and Pete Spencer, was released on 9 June 1979. It peaked at number 31 in the UK charts, but climbed to number 10 in Germany where Keegan was based at the time, and where Norman's band Smokie was popular. He released another single, "England", on his return to England from Germany, but it failed to chart.

== Personal life ==
In September 1970, Keegan met his future wife, Jean Woodhouse, on the Waltzers at Doncaster fair. They married on 23 September 1974 and had two daughters.

Keegan became renowned for his "poodle perm" hair in the 1970s and regularly appeared at the top of "worst hairstyles" surveys.

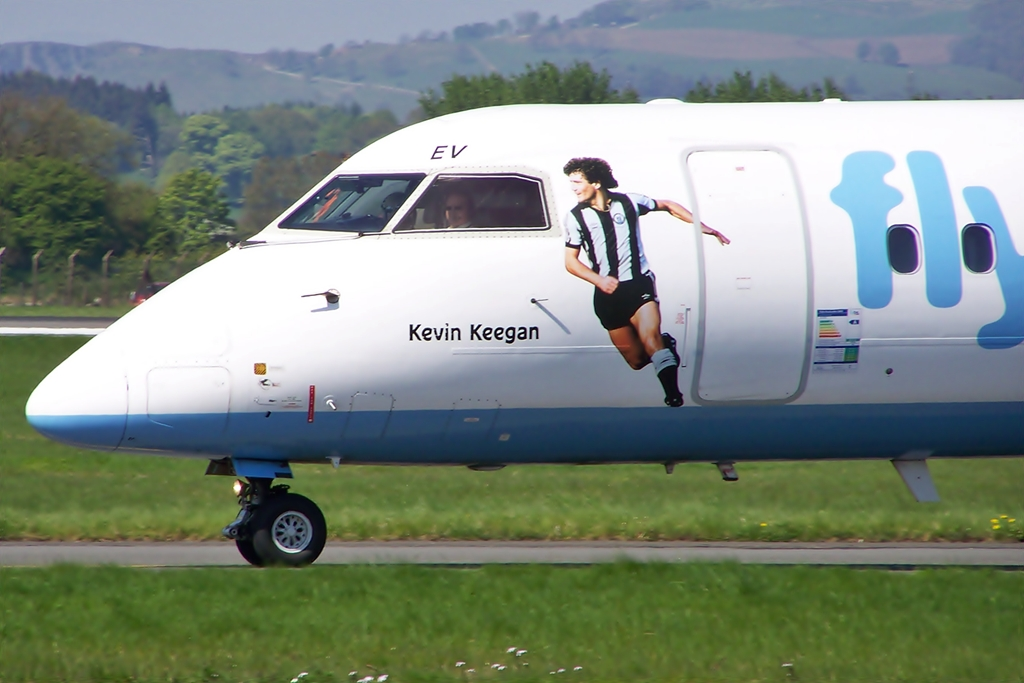
Portrait of Keegan as a Newcastle United player on a Flybe aircraft

In July 2008, Flybe International announced the naming of one of its new Bombardier Q400 aircraft in honour of Keegan's service to Newcastle United, both as a player and as manager. The plane was used on the regular service from Newcastle International Airport to London's Gatwick Airport.

He made appearances at charity cricket matches for Lord's Taverners and Sussex Cricket Club.

In April 1991, he was attacked while sleeping in his Range Rover in a car park near the M25 at Reigate Hill in Surrey. His assailants later said in court that they needed money for a drug debt and did not know they were attacking Keegan.

=== Death and tributes ===
Keegan died from stomach cancer on 20 July 2026, aged 75. His family had announced the diagnosis in January, and in June, he disclosed that the cancer was stage four.

Following Keegan's death, Newcastle United issued a tribute describing him as "one of the most iconic, influential and deeply loved figures" in the club's history and calling him "the beating heart of Newcastle United". Liverpool said his "indomitable spirit" and contribution would be "forever etched" in their history. England and Manchester City also expressed condolences, with City noting his role in helping establish them as a Premier League club. Hamburg said: "HSV mourns the passing of one of the greatest footballers ever to wear the shirt" and that it would "always honour the memory of a member of the club’s title-winning side and a two-time Ballon d’Or winner." William, Prince of Wales, president of the Football Association, said he was "incredibly saddened" by Keegan's death and called him "a truly remarkable footballer and manager". Alan Shearer, whom Keegan signed for Newcastle, posted, "My hero. My manager. My friend. Sleep easy Boss."

In October 2026 the Baltic Centre for Contemporary Art displayed a tribute to Keegan.

== Career statistics ==
=== Club ===
Appearances and goals by club, season and competition
Club	Season	League			National cup		League cup		Continental		Other		Total	
Club	Season	Division	Apps	Goals	Apps	Goals	Apps	Goals	Apps	Goals	Apps	Goals	Apps	Goals
Scunthorpe United	1968–69	Fourth Division	33	2	1	0	1	0	–		–		35	2
Scunthorpe United	1969–70	Fourth Division	46	6	7	3	1	0	–		–		54	9
Scunthorpe United	1970–71	Fourth Division	45	10	6	0	1	1	–		–		52	11
Scunthorpe United	Total		124	18	14	3	3	1	0	0	0	0	141	22
Liverpool	1971–72	First Division	35	9	3	2	1	0	3 (Note: Appearances in European Cup Winners' Cup)	0	0	0	42	11
Liverpool	1972–73	First Division	41	13	4	0	8	5	11 (Note: Appearances in UEFA Cup)	4	0	0	64	22
Liverpool	1973–74	First Division	42	12	9	6	6	1	4 (Note: Appearances in European Cup)	0	0	0	61	19
Liverpool	1974–75	First Division	33	10	2	1	3	0	3	1	1 (Note: Appearance in FA Charity Shield)	0	42	12
Liverpool	1975–76	First Division	41	12	2	1	3	0	11	3	0	0	57	16
Liverpool	1976–77	First Division	38	12	8	4	2	0	8	4	1	0	57	20
Liverpool	Total		230	68	28	14	23	6	40	12	2	0	323	100
Hamburger SV	1977–78	Bundesliga	25	6	4	4	–		4	2	2 (Note: Appearances in UEFA Super Cup)	0	35	12
Hamburger SV	1978–79	Bundesliga	34	17	1	0	–		–		0	0	35	17
Hamburger SV	1979–80	Bundesliga	31	9	3	0	–		9	2	0	0	43	11
Hamburger SV	Total		90	32	8	4	0	0	13	4	2	0	113	40
Southampton	1980–81	First Division	27	11	4	1	1	0	0	0	0	0	32	12
Southampton	1981–82	First Division	41	26	1	1	2	1	4	2	0	0	48	30
Southampton	Total		68	37	5	2	3	1	4	2	0	0	80	42
Newcastle United	1982–83	Second Division	37	21	2	0	2	0	0	0	0	0	41	21
Newcastle United	1983–84	Second Division	41	27	1	0	2	1	0	0	0	0	44	28
Newcastle United	Total		78	48	3	0	4	1	0	0	0	0	85	49
Blacktown City	1985	National Soccer League	2	1	–		–		–		0	0	2	1
Career total			592	204	58	23	33	9	57	18	4	0	744	254

=== International ===
Appearances and goals by national team and year
National team	Year	Apps	Goals
England	1972	1	0
England	1973	1	0
England	1974	7	2
England	1975	8	2
England	1976	9	2
England	1977	8	2
England	1978	6	3
England	1979	8	5
England	1980	6	3
England	1981	5	1
England	1982	4	1
Total		63	21

Scores and results list England's goal tally first, score column indicates score after each Keegan goal.

List of international goals scored by Kevin Keegan
No.	Date	Venue	Opponent	Score	Result	Competition
1	11 May 1974	Ninian Park, Cardiff	Wales	2–0	2–0	1974 British Home Championship
2	5 June 1974	Stadion Crvena Zvezda, Belgrade	Yugoslavia	2–2	2–2	Friendly
3	11 May 1975	Tsirion Stadium, Cyprus	Cyprus	1–0	1–0	Euro 1976 qualifier
4	3 September 1975	St. Jakob-Park, Basel	Switzerland	1–0	2–1	Friendly
5	13 June 1976	Helsinki Olympic Stadium, Helsinki	Finland	2–1	4–1	1978 World Cup qualifier
6	13 June 1976	Helsinki Olympic Stadium, Helsinki	Finland	4–1	4–1	1978 World Cup qualifier
7	30 March 1977	Wembley Stadium, London	Luxembourg	1–0	5–0	1978 World Cup qualifier
8	16 November 1977	Wembley Stadium, London	Italy	1–0	2–0	1978 World Cup qualifier
9	19 April 1978	Wembley Stadium, London	Brazil	1–1	1–1	Friendly
10	20 September 1978	Parken Stadium, Copenhagen	Denmark	1–0	4–3	Euro 1980 qualifier
11	20 September 1978	Parken Stadium, Copenhagen	Denmark	2–0	4–3	Euro 1980 qualifier
12	7 February 1979	Wembley Stadium, London	Northern Ireland	1–0	4–0	Euro 1980 qualifier
13	26 May 1979	Wembley Stadium, London	Scotland	3–1	3–1	1979 British Home Championship
14	6 June 1979	Vasil Levski National Stadium, Sofia	Bulgaria	1–0	3–0	Euro 1980 qualifier
15	13 June 1979	Praterstadion, Vienna	Austria	1–2	3–4	Friendly
16	12 September 1979	Wembley Stadium, London	Denmark	1–0	1–0	Euro 1980 qualifier
17	6 February 1980	Wembley Stadium, London	Republic of Ireland	1–0	2–0	Euro 1980 qualifier
18	6 February 1980	Wembley Stadium, London	Republic of Ireland	2–0	2–0	Euro 1980 qualifier
19	13 May 1980	Wembley Stadium, London	Argentina	3–1	3–1	Friendly
20	6 June 1981	Népstadion, Budapest	Hungary	3–1	3–1	1982 World Cup qualifier
21	23 February 1982	Wembley Stadium, London	Northern Ireland	2–0	4–0	1982 British Home Championship

== Managerial statistics ==
As of match played 30 November 2013.

Team	From	To	Record				
Team	From	To	G	W	D	L	Win %
Newcastle United	5 February 1992	8 January 1997	251	138	51	62	54.98
Fulham	7 May 1998	9 May 1999	61	38	12	11	62.30
England	18 February 1999	7 October 2000	18	7	7	4	38.89
Manchester City	24 May 2001	11 March 2005	176	77	39	60	43.75
Newcastle United	16 January 2008	4 September 2008	22	7	6	9	31.82
Total			528	267	115	146	50.57

== Honours ==
=== Player ===
Liverpool

- Football League First Division: 1972–73, 1975–76, 1976–77
- FA Cup: 1973–74; runner-up: 1976–77
- FA Charity Shield: 1974, 1976
- European Cup: 1976–77
- UEFA Cup: 1972–73, 1975–76

Hamburg

- Bundesliga: 1978–79
- European Cup runner-up: 1979–80

England

- British Home Championship: 1973, 1975, 1979, 1982

Individual

- Ballon d'Or: 1978, 1979
- kicker Bundesliga Team of the Season: 1977–78, 1978–79, 1979–80
- Inducted into the inaugural English Football Hall of Fame in 2002.
- Named 8th on the Liverpool list of 100 Players who shook the Kop.
- PFA Team of the Year: 1975–76 First Division, 1976–77 First Division, 1981–82 First Division, 1982–83 Second Division, 1983–84 Second Division
- FWA Footballer of the Year: 1975–76
- PFA Players' Player of the Year: 1981–82
- Football League 100 Legends
- FIFA 100
- Onze Mondial: 1976, 1977, 1979, 1980
- Onze d'Argent: 1976, 1980
- Onze d'Or: 1977, 1979
- Sport Ideal European XI: 1978, 1979
- North-East FWA Player of the Year: 1983, 1984
- Southampton Player of the Season: 1981–82
- Newcastle United Player of the Year: 1982–83, 1983–84

=== Manager ===
Newcastle United

- Football League First Division: 1992–93

Fulham

- Football League Second Division: 1998–99

Manchester City

- Football League First Division: 2001–02

Individual

- Premier League Manager of the Month: November 1993, August 1994, February 1995, August 1995, September 1995

=== Orders ===
- Officer of the Order of the British Empire, 1982 Birthday Honours

== Sources ==
Books

- Hodges, Michael (19 September 1997). Kevin Keegan (first ed.). United Kingdom: Boxtree. ISBN 9780752224763.
- Keegan, Kevin (1998). My Autobiography. London: Warner Books. ISBN 978-0-7515-2377-5.
- Keegan, Kevin (4 October 2018). My Life in Football: The Autobiography. United Kingdom: Pan Macmillan. ISBN 978-1509877201.

Magazines

- Pilger, Sam (4 May 2019), "Kevin Keegan on Liverpool v Newcastle, 1996: "I still have nightmares about how we threw the title away"", FourFourTwo
