= Steve Carney =

English footballer

Personal information
- Date of birth: 22 September 1957
- Place of birth: Wallsend, England
- Date of death: 6 May 2013 (aged 55)
- Place of death: Newcastle upon Tyne,
- Position: Defender

Senior career*
Years	Team	Apps	(Gls)
1979–1985	Blyth Spartans		
1979–1985	Newcastle United	134	(1)
1984	→ Carlisle United (loan)	6	(0)
1985–1986	Darlington	12	(0)
1985	→ Rochdale (loan)	4	(0)
1986	Hartlepool United	7	(0)
–	Tow Law Town		
- * Club domestic league appearances and goals

Stephen Carney (22 September 1957 – 6 May 2013) was an English professional footballer who played in the Football League as a defender for Newcastle United, Carlisle United, Darlington, Rochdale and Hartlepool United.

Carney joined Newcastle United in October 1979 from Blyth Spartans for a £1,000 fee, made his debut on 1 December in a 2–0 win against Fulham in the Second Division, and left the club in 1985 for £20.000. transfer to Darlington.

He died in 2013, aged 55, of pancreatic cancer.
