= Terry McDermott =

English footballer and manager (born 1951)

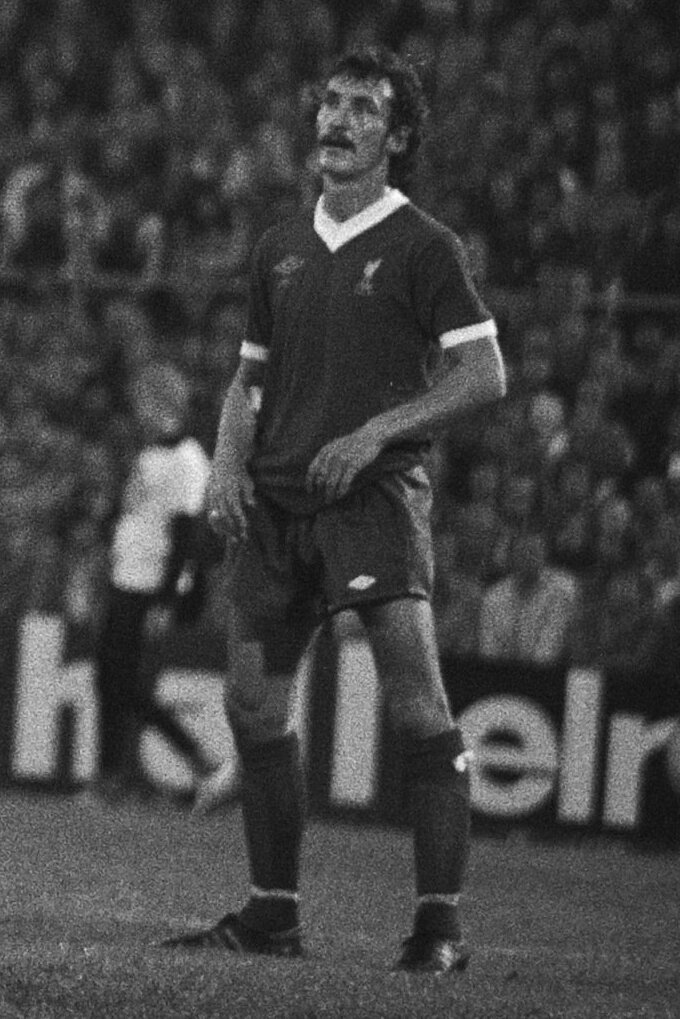
- McDermott with Liverpool in 1977

Personal information
- Full name: Terence McDermott
- Date of birth: 8 December 1951 (age 74)
- Place of birth: Liverpool, England
- Position: Midfielder

Youth career
- Bury

Senior career*
Years	Team	Apps	(Gls)
1969–1973	Bury	90	(8)
1973–1974	Newcastle United	56	(6)
1974–1982	Liverpool	232	(54)
1982–1984	Newcastle United	74	(12)
1985	Cork City	7	(1)
1985–1987	APOEL	50	(1)
Total		509	(82)

International career
1974	England U-23	1	(0)
1978	England B	1	(1)
1977–1982	England	25	(3)

Managerial career
- 1992–1998: Newcastle United (assistant)
- 1999–2000: Celtic (assistant)
- 2005–2008: Newcastle United (assistant)
- 2008–2012: Huddersfield Town (assistant)
- 2012–2014: Birmingham City (assistant)
- * Club domestic league appearances and goals

Terence McDermott (born 8 December 1951) is an English former professional footballer who played as a midfielder. Nicknamed "Terry Mac", he is best known as a member of the Liverpool team of the 1970s and early 1980s, where he won three European Cups and five First Division titles. Either side of his time at Anfield, he played for Newcastle United, with his second stint seeing him reunite with former Liverpool teammate Kevin Keegan. Internationally, he was capped 25 times for England, and was part of the UEFA Euro 1980 and the 1982 FIFA World Cup squads.

McDermott has had an extensive coaching career, returning to Newcastle to be Keegan's assistant manager, and would be kept on following Kenny Dalglish's appointment as manager. He joined Celtic in 1999 to be John Barnes' assistant. McDermott returned to Newcastle again to be one of Graeme Souness' assistants and remained with the club until 2008, which included a short reunion with Keegan. He then became Lee Clark's assistant at Huddersfield Town and Birmingham City.

== Playing career ==
=== Early career ===
McDermott joined Bury as a youngster in 1969. He made a total of 90 appearances and eight goals before joining Newcastle United in 1973. Manager Joe Harvey gave McDermott his Newcastle debut on 17 March 1973, at Old Trafford against Manchester United. He came off the bench but could not do anything to prevent Newcastle losing 2–1.

McDermott reached the FA Cup final in 1974 against Liverpool. However, Newcastle lost the match 3–0.

=== Liverpool ===
Liverpool boss Bob Paisley, in his first season in charge after replacing Bill Shankly, brought McDermott to Merseyside in November 1974. McDermott made his Liverpool debut on 16 November, as did Phil Neal, in a Merseyside derby against Everton at Goodison Park. Neither side could break the deadlock with both sides sharing the points. McDermott's first goal came in a 1–1 league draw with Burnley at Turf Moor on 8 March 1975.

For the next two years, McDermott struggled to get into the team or hold down a place once given his chance. Liverpool won the League championship and the UEFA Cup in the 1975–76 season but McDermott did not play in enough matches to pick up a League medal, although he was in the squad which won in Europe. Speculation mounted that he would move on in the summer of 1976, but instead he stayed at Anfield and became an integral part of the following season's triumphs.

McDermott was a fixture in the 1977 side that retained the title. Meanwhile, his goal against Everton in the semi-final of the FA Cup, a turn and chip from the edge of the penalty area, was voted the "Goal of the Season" by the BBC. That game finished 2–2, with Liverpool winning the replay. A subsequent success in a European Cup semi-final meant that Liverpool had reached the finals of both the FA Cup and European Cup, which were scheduled to be played respectively at Wembley and at Rome's Stadio Olimpico within four days of each other in May 1977. However, Liverpool were defeated in the FA Cup final by Manchester United, which ended their "treble" dream. There was joy for McDermott four days later, though, when he opened the scoring in the European Cup final against Borussia Mönchengladbach as Liverpool won 3–1.

On 6 December 1977, he scored a hat-trick in the second leg of Liverpool's victory over Hamburg in the UEFA Super Cup Final.

Liverpool reached their first League Cup final in 1978 and this occasion was to prove memorable for McDermott for the wrong reasons. The first game at Wembley against Nottingham Forest ended goalless, but McDermott had a goal disallowed after the officials decided that Kenny Dalglish was in an offside position when McDermott struck his shot. In the replay at Old Trafford, after Forest had opened the scoring with a hotly disputed penalty, McDermott scored what he thought was the equaliser with a well-struck drive, only for the officials to deny him again, claiming he had controlled the pass with his arm. Forest held on to win 1–0 and McDermott offered to swear on oath in an after-match interview that he had trapped the ball legally with his chest.

Consolation at missing out on the League Cup was found at the end of the season when McDermott featured in the Liverpool team which retained the European Cup thanks to a 1–0 win over Club Brugge at Wembley.

The following season, McDermott scored one of Liverpool's most memorable goals. It came at Anfield in a League match against Tottenham Hotspur on 2 September 1978. Liverpool were defending a corner which was cleared from their own penalty area to striker David Johnson, who hit a long pass to the sprinting winger Steve Heighway on the left flank as McDermott started to chase forward. Within just a few seconds, the ball was in the Spurs net as Heighway raced down the line and crossed the ball, without stopping to control it, for McDermott to head home after a 70-yard run. This was the final goal in a 7–0 win.

By the end of that season, McDermott and Liverpool were champions again and they retained the title in 1980, with McDermott being voted the PFA Players' Player of the Year and the FWA Footballer of the Year - the first player to win both awards in the same season. He scored another memorable goal against Tottenham that season, this time in the FA Cup at White Hart Lane, when he took a misplaced pass from Osvaldo Ardiles on the right hand corner of the penalty area, flicked the ball into the air and hit a lob-volley into the far corner of the goal.

In 1981, McDermott featured as Liverpool beat West Ham United after a replay to win the League Cup for the first time. Later that season, he appeared in the team that defeated Real Madrid in the European Cup final. A further League title and League Cup followed in 1982 but his place in the side was becoming less assured.

=== Later career ===
McDermott returned to Newcastle United in September 1982. At Newcastle, he featured alongside his former Liverpool teammate Kevin Keegan, and youngsters Chris Waddle and Peter Beardsley, as Newcastle won promotion back to the top flight of English football in 1984. McDermott left Newcastle in January 1985 and moved abroad to play with Cork City in Ireland.

From 1985 to 1987, McDermott played for the Cypriot club APOEL, alongside Ian Moores, where he won the Cypriot Championship and the Cypriot Super Cup.

== International career ==
On 7 September 1977, Ron Greenwood gave McDermott his debut for England in a 0–0 friendly draw with Switzerland at Wembley Stadium. He opened his goalscoring account on 10 September 1980 during a World Cup qualifier at Wembley against Norway. McDermott scored twice, including a penalty, as England won 4–0.

McDermott was selected for the England squad which travelled to the 1980 European Championships in Italy. He played in two of the group games. McDermott was also picked for the England squad for the 1982 FIFA World Cup in Spain but did not play, despite having featured in every qualifying game. He never played for England again and only featured as a substitute in one match for Liverpool the following season.

In his England career, he had been capped 25 times at senior level, and scored three goals.

== Coaching career ==
When Kevin Keegan became manager of Newcastle on 5 February 1992, he recruited McDermott as his first team coach. Together, the two masterminded a return to the top of the English game for Newcastle, which included a close run to the League title in 1996, eventually won by Manchester United. After Keegan resigned, McDermott stayed at Newcastle for a further season under Kenny Dalglish. He left the club when Dalglish resigned and his successor Ruud Gullit decided to bring in his own coach.

When John Barnes was appointed as head coach of Celtic on 8 June 1999, he appointed McDermott as assistant head coach alongside Eric Black, before they were all sacked following the Scottish Cup defeat by Inverness Caledonian Thistle in February 2000.

In 2005, McDermott returned to Newcastle after he was recruited by manager Graeme Souness to work as a coach. After the sacking of Souness in February 2006, McDermott stayed on under managers Glenn Roeder, Sam Allardyce and Keegan once again. When Keegan quit in September 2008, McDermott also left, along with Adam Sadler.

On 19 December 2008, McDermott was named assistant manager of League One side Huddersfield Town, effectively becoming Lee Clark's right-hand man. Following the sacking of Clark in February 2012, McDermott was also sacked. In June 2012, he joined Birmingham City as Clark's assistant. On 17 February 2014, it was widely reported that he and first-team coach Derek Fazackerley had left Birmingham; this was later confirmed by the club.

== Personal life ==
McDermott's sons Neale and Greg also played football, formerly on the books of Gateshead. He also has a daughter named Rachel.

McDermott was head of a consortium, which also included ex-Newcastle player Alan Shearer, that owned several racehorses, including Intersky Falcon.

On 22 August 2021, he announced that he had been diagnosed with dementia.

== Career statistics ==
=== Club ===
Appearances and goals by club, season and competition
Club	Season	League			FA Cup		League Cup		Europe (Note: Appearance(s) in European Cup)		Other		Total	
Club	Season	Division	Apps	Goals	Apps	Goals	Apps	Goals	Apps	Goals	Apps	Goals	Apps	Goals
Bury	1969–70	Third Division	12	0	0	0	0	0	—		—		12	0
Bury	1970–71	Third Division	16	3	1	0	0	0	—		—		17	3
Bury	1971–72	Fourth Division	35	3	4	1	1	0	—		—		40	4
Bury	1972–73	Fourth Division	27	2	1	0	4	1	—		—		32	3
Bury	Total		90	8	6	1	5	1	—		—		101	10
Newcastle United	1972–73	First Division	8	1	0	0	0	0	—		6 (Note: Five appearances in Anglo-Italian Cup; one appearance in Texaco Cup)	0	14	1
Newcastle United	1973–74	First Division	36	4	10	3	2	1	—		7 (Note: Appearance(s) in Texaco Cup)	0	55	8
Newcastle United	1974–75	First Division	12	1	0	0	2	0	—		6	0	20	1
Newcastle United	Total		56	6	10	3	4	1	—		19	0	89	10
Liverpool	1974–75	First Division	15	2	0	0	0	0	0	0	0	0	15	2
Liverpool	1975–76	First Division	9	1	0	0	1	0	0	0	—		10	1
Liverpool	1976–77	First Division	26	1	5	1	0	0	7	2	0	0	38	4
Liverpool	1977–78	First Division	37	4	0	0	8	0	6	1	2 (Note: One appearance in FA Charity Shield; one appearance three goals in European Super Cup)	3	53	8
Liverpool	1978–79	First Division	37	8	7	0	1	0	2	0	2 (Note: Appearance(s) in European Super Cup)	0	49	8
Liverpool	1979–80	First Division	37	11	6	2	7	1	2	0	1 (Note: Appearance(s) in FA Charity Shield)	2	53	16
Liverpool	1980–81	First Division	40	13	2	1	9	1	8	6	1	1	60	22
Liverpool	1981–82	First Division	29	14	3	0	10	3	5	3	1 (Note: Appearance(s) in Intercontinental Cup)	0	48	20
Liverpool	1982–83	First Division	2	0	0	0	0	0	1	0	0	0	3	0
Liverpool	Total		232	54	23	4	36	5	31	12	7	6	329	81
Newcastle United	1982–83	Second Division	32	6	2	1	1	0	—		—		35	7
Newcastle United	1983–84	Second Division	42	6	1	0	2	1	—		—		45	7
Newcastle United	Total		74	12	3	1	3	1	—		—		80	14
Career total			452	80	42	9	48	8	31	12	26	6	599	115

== Managerial statistics ==
Team	From	To	Record				
Team	From	To	G	W	L	D	Win %
Newcastle United	8 January 1997	14 January 1997	1	0	0	1	00.00

== Honours ==
Newcastle United

- Texaco Cup: 1973–74
- Anglo-Italian Cup: 1973
- FA Cup runner-up: 1973–74

Liverpool

- Football League First Division: 1975–76, 1976–77, 1978–79, 1979–80, 1981–82
- Football League Cup: 1980–81, 1981–82; runner-up: 1977–78
- FA Charity Shield: 1976, 1977 (shared), 1979, 1980
- European Cup: 1976–77, 1977–78, 1980–81
- UEFA Cup: 1975–76
- UEFA Super Cup: 1977
- FA Cup runner-up: 1976–77

APOEL Nicosia

- Cypriot First Division: 1985–86
- Cypriot Super Cup: 1986

Individual

- First Division Goal of the Season: 1976–77
- PFA Team of the Year: 1979–80 First Division
- PFA Players' Player of the Year: 1979–80
- FWA Footballer of the Year: 1979–80
- European Cup Top Scorer: 1980–81

== Bibliography ==
- Kelly, Stephen F. (1988). You'll Never Walk Alone. London: Queen Anne Press. ISBN 0-356-19594-5.
