= Bernd Wehmeyer =

German footballer

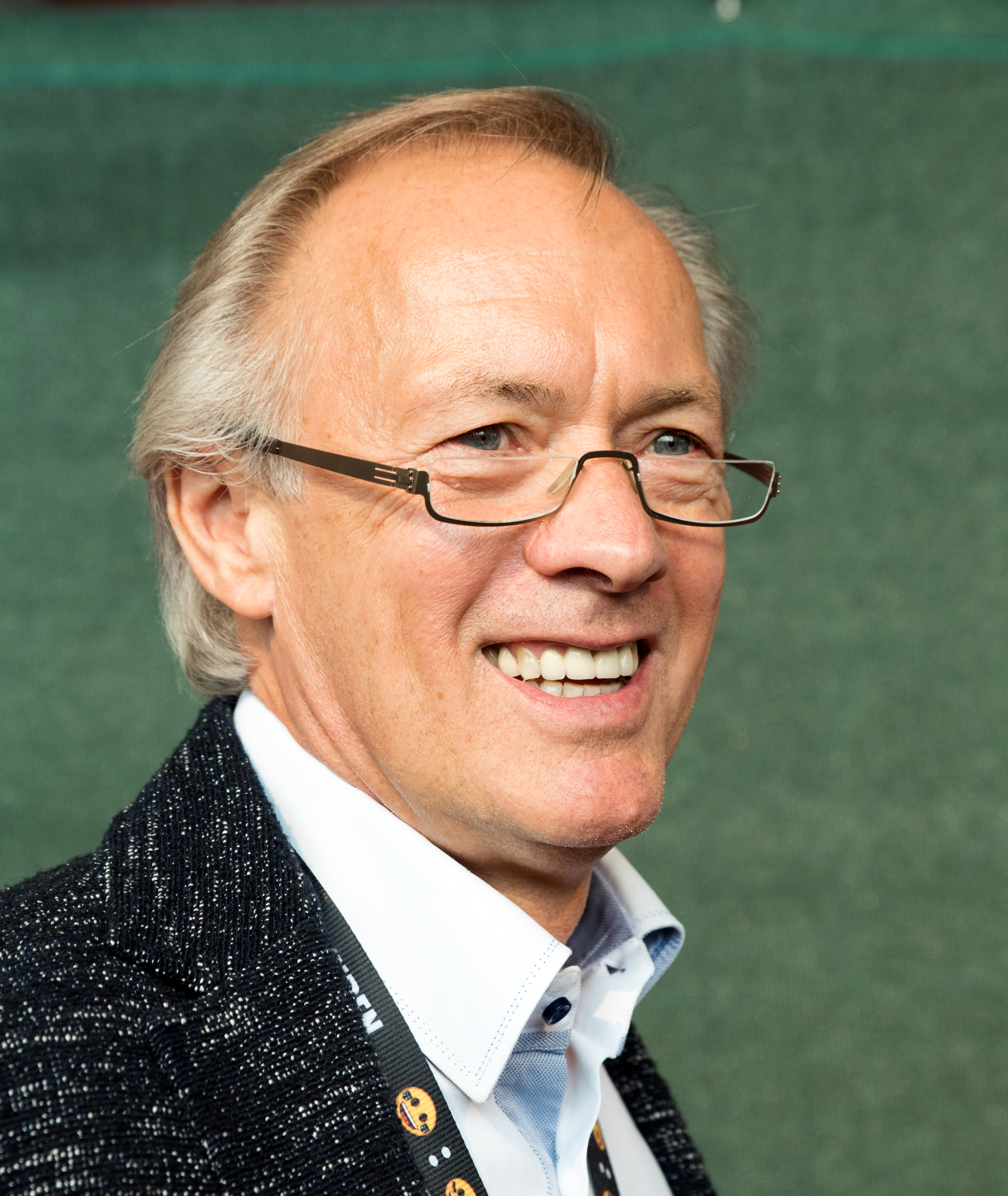

Personal information
- Full name: Bernd Wehmeyer
- Date of birth: 6 June 1952 (age 74)
- Place of birth: Herford, West Germany
- Height: 1.72 m (5 ft 8 in)
- Position: Defender

Senior career*
Years	Team	Apps	(Gls)
1971–1972	Arminia Bielefeld	2	(0)
1973–1975	Hannover 96	61	(9)
1975–1976	Arminia Bielefeld	27	(0)
1976–1978	Hannover 96	66	(9)
1978–1986	Hamburger SV	183	(10)
- * Club domestic league appearances and goals

Bernd Wehmeyer (born 6 June 1952) is a retired German footballer. He spent 11 seasons in the Bundesliga with Arminia Bielefeld, Hannover 96 and Hamburger SV.

== Honours ==
Hamburger SV

- European Cup winner: 1982–83
- European Cup runner-up: 1979–80
- UEFA Cup finalist: 1981–82
- Bundesliga champion: 1978–79, 1981–82, 1982–83
- Bundesliga runner-up: 1979–80, 1980–81, 1983–84
