= Hans-Günther Plücken =

German footballer

Personal information
- Date of birth: 15 November 1954 (age 71)
- Positions: Striker; midfielder

Senior career*
Years	Team	Apps	(Gls)
1976–1978	Union Solingen	57	(22)
1978–1979	Hamburger SV	17	(2)
1980	Hertha BSC	17	(1)
1980–1982	Bayer Uerdingen	16	(1)
- * Club domestic league appearances and goals

Hans-Günther Plücken (born 15 November 1954) is a retired German football player. He spent three seasons in the Bundesliga with Hamburger SV, Hertha BSC and Bayer Uerdingen.

== Honours ==
- European Cup finalist: 1979–80
- Bundesliga champion: 1978–79
