= Chris Hedworth =

English footballer

Personal information
- Full name: Christopher Hedworth
- Date of birth: 5 January 1964 (age 62)
- Place of birth: Wallsend, England
- Height: 6 ft 1 in (1.85 m)
- Position: Centre-half

Youth career
- –1982: Newcastle United

Senior career*
Years	Team	Apps	(Gls)
1982–1986	Newcastle United	9	(0)
1986–1988	Barnsley	25	(0)
1988–1990	Halifax Town	38	(0)
1990–1992	Blackpool	24	(0)
- * Club domestic league appearances and goals

Christopher Hedworth (born 5 January 1964) is an English retired football centre-half. During a career of ten years in the 1980s and 1990s, Hedworth played for various clubs in the north of England as a slender centre-half. His reputation at Barnsley for shakiness and error-proneness led to him being something of a cult hero at the Yorkshire club, and he is renowned as one of a trio of goalkeepers fielded by Newcastle in a match in 1986.

Hedworth started as an apprentice at Newcastle, signing professional terms in 1982. His debut came in October of that year, a 1–3 loss at Leeds United. A moment of note came on 21 April 1986 when, in a 1–8 loss to West Ham, he was one of three goalkeepers fielded by Newcastle; a not-completely-fit Martin Thomas was taken off injured at half time – Newcastle had no back-up goalkeeper on the bench, and so Hedworth played in goal, before injuring himself after less than 30 minutes. He was replaced by Peter Beardsley in goal. Hammers centre-back Alvin Martin scored a hat-trick, with one goal coming against each of the three keepers. It would be Hedworth's last game for the Magpies.

He would go on to make nine league starts and one start in the League Cup before he moved on to Barnsley on a free transfer in the summer of 1986.

25 appearances for the Tykes were unconvincing, and after two years Hedworth moved on to Halifax Town.

He retired in 1992 after a similar two-year spell at Blackpool.
