= Jeff Clarke (English footballer) =

English footballer

Personal information
- Full name: Jeffrey Derek Clarke
- Date of birth: 18 January 1954 (age 72)
- Place of birth: Hemsworth, England
- Height: 6 ft 0 in (1.83 m)
- Position: Defender

Team information
- Current team: Dundee United (head academy physiotherapist)

Senior career*
Years	Team	Apps	(Gls)
1974–1975	Manchester City	13	(0)
1975–1982	Sunderland	181	(6)
1982–1987	Newcastle United	124	(4)
1984	→ Brighton (loan)	4	(0)
1984–1984	Ankaragücü		
1985–1985	Darlington		
Total		322	(10)
- * Club domestic league appearances and goals

Jeffrey Derek Clarke (born 18 January 1954) is an English former footballer who is head academy physiotherapist at Scottish Premiership club Dundee United. He played as a defender, primarily for Sunderland and Newcastle United. He has been at Dundee United since November 2003, mainly as physiotherapist for the first team.

== Playing career ==
Clarke began his professional career in 1974 with Manchester City, featuring in thirteen league appearances before leaving a year later to join Sunderland in a swap deal with Dave Watson. In seven years at Roker Park, Clarke played in over 200 matches and experienced promotion to the top flight before moving to rivals Newcastle United on a free transfer in 1982. Another five years in the North East – including another top-flight promotion – preceded short-lived spells at Turkish side Ankaragücü and Darlington.

== Physiotherapy career ==
Following his retirement from playing, Clarke coached at former club Newcastle, studying a physiotherapy degree at the University of Salford at the same time. He graduated in 1996. Clarke became a physio at another former club, Sunderland, before taking on the same role at Leeds United in 2001. Following his redundancy in 2003, he joined Dundee United in November of that year, taking on additional coaching duties at one point in March 2005. By 2020 he was no longer involved with the first team, having been appointed as full-time head physiotherapist within the club's youth academy.

== Honours ==
=== As a player ===
Sunderland

- Second Division Title winner: 1975–76
