= 1984–85 Eintracht Frankfurt season =

Eintracht Frankfurt
1984–85 season
- Chairman: Klaus Gramlich
- Manager: Dietrich Weise
- Bundesliga: 12th
- DFB-Pokal: 2nd Round
- Top goalscorer: League: Harald Krämer (10); All: Harald Krämer and Cezary Tobollik (10)
- Highest home attendance: 65,000 3 April 1985 v Bayern Munich (league)
- Lowest home attendance: 11,000 16 February 1985 v Karlsruher SC (league)
- Average home league attendance: 23,647

The 1984–85 Eintracht Frankfurt season was the 85th season in the club's football history. In 1984–85 the club played in the Bundesliga, the top tier of German football. It was the club's 22nd season in the Bundesliga.

== Matches ==
=== Legend ===
Win Draw Loss Postponed

=== Friendlies ===
16 July 1984	Zeilsheim XI (West Germany)	0–11	(West Germany) Eintracht Frankfurt	Frankfurt, West Germany
19:00 CEST		Report	Svensson 8', 58', 66'; Trieb 17'; Kroth 19', 24', 54'; Mohr 21'; Müller 30'; Mattern 63'; Fruck 67'	Stadium: Sportanlage Hohe Kanzel; Attendance: 2,000; Referee: Koch

18 July 1984	SG Heidelberg-Kirchheim (West Germany)	2–5	(West Germany) Eintracht Frankfurt	West Germany
	Rihm 41'; Fetzer 48'	Report	Müller 7'; Kroth 15'; Mattern 61' (pen.)	Attendance: 800

21 July 1984	Olympia Lampertheim (West Germany)	0–5	(West Germany) Eintracht Frankfurt	West Germany
		Report	Mohr 66', 87'; Sievers 71'; Krämer 75', 76'	Attendance: 1,200; Referee: Piry

23 July 1984	FC Isny (West Germany)	1–4	(West Germany) Eintracht Frankfurt	West Germany
	Schmähl 87'	Report	Tobollik; Mattern 24'; Sievers 25'; Kroth (pen.)	Attendance: 1,500

28 July 1984	SV Rangendingen (West Germany)	0–10	(West Germany) Eintracht Frankfurt	West Germany
		Report	Sievers 23'; Müller 38'; Falkenmayer 42', 62', 85'; Trieb 44', 87'; Mattern 48', 64'; Rieth 75'	Attendance: 1,500

1 August 1984	Kehler FV (West Germany)	2–7	(West Germany) Eintracht Frankfurt	Kehl, West Germany
	Goal	Report	Mattern 18', 54'; Sievers 33'; Falkenmayer 52', 79'; Svensson 72'; Tobollik 80'

3 August 1984	Rot-Weiß Lüdenscheid (West Germany)	0–3	(West Germany) Eintracht Frankfurt	Lüdenscheid, West Germany
		Report	Berthold 3'; Svensson 37'; Falkenmayer 77'	Attendance: 1,800; Referee: Löwer
Note: The match was abandoned in the 83rd minute of play due to heavy rainfall.

4 August 1984	SV Nieder-Wöllstadt (West Germany)	1–9	(West Germany) Eintracht Frankfurt	Wöllstadt, West Germany
	Weiß 63'	Report	Fruck 40'; Falkenmayer 41'; Tobollik 54'; Müller 55', 69'; Svensson 58', 60'; Berthold 70'; Kroth 85'	Attendance: 1,500; Referee: Schusterschitz

8 August 1984	Eintracht Frankfurt (West Germany)	1–1	(Brazil) Grêmio FBPA	Frankfurt, West Germany
20:00 CEST	Müller 38'	Report	Gullherme 54'	Stadium: Waldstadion; Attendance: 4,800; Referee: Föckler

11 August 1984	SKV Mörfelden (West Germany)	3–4	(West Germany) Eintracht Frankfurt	West Germany
	Janczak 31'; Glasl 52'; Klein 88'	Report	Mattern 8', 25'; Krämer 27'; Sievers 77'	Attendance: 1,200; Referee: Beck

14 August 1984	FSV Großenhausen (West Germany)	1–11	(West Germany) Eintracht Frankfurt	West Germany
	Reus 34'	Report	Berthold 4', 83'; Tobollik 16'; Trieb 21', 41'; Müller 43'; Svensson 54'; Falkenmayer 61', 69' (pen.), 83'; Mattern 85'	Attendance: 1,500

18 August 1984	SpVgg Bad Homburg (West Germany)	1–5	(West Germany) Eintracht Frankfurt	Bad Homburg, West Germany
	Pross 75'	Report	Sievers 18'; Mohr 23'; Berthold 40'; Müller 48'; Svensson 65'	Attendance: 1,800; Referee: Hartmann

20 August 1984	Marburg district XI (West Germany)	1–4	(West Germany) Eintracht Frankfurt	Ebsdorfergrund, West Germany
	Laus 41'	Report	Müller 2'; Svensson 33', 54'; Berthold 56'	Attendance: 3,000; Referee: Junge

4 September 1984	SSV Dillenburg (West Germany)	0–8	(West Germany) Eintracht Frankfurt	Frankfurt, West Germany
		Report	Trieb 9', 69' (pen.); Fruck 13', 33'; Tobollik 19'; Kroth 76'; Müller 78'; Svensson 83'	Stadium: Riederwaldstadion; Attendance: 1,000; Referee: Kreft

18 September 1984	SpVgg Erzhausen (West Germany)	3–15	(West Germany) Eintracht Frankfurt	West Germany
	Kämpfer 22'; Best 38'; Queseleit 47'	Report	Sievers 2'; Müller 7', 12', 18', 39', 42'; Mohr 23', 36', 60', 79'; Trieb 32' (pen.); Falkenmayer 35'; Tobollik 68', 88'; Friz 74'	Attendance: 600; Referee: Abbé

13 October 1984	VfB Unterliederbach (West Germany)	0–6	(West Germany) Eintracht Frankfurt	Frankfurt, West Germany
		Report	Mattern; Tobollik; Krämer; Trieb; Kwiecień	Attendance: 2,000

15 December 1984	1. FC Haßloch (West Germany)	3–6	(West Germany) Eintracht Frankfurt	West Germany
	Strub 14' (pen.), 87'; Langohr 90'	Report	Krämer 19', 66', 89'; Mohr 70', 87'; Müller 81'	Attendance: 1,200; Referee: Andres

13 January 1985	Spvgg 05 Oberrad (West Germany)	0–9	(West Germany) Eintracht Frankfurt	Frankfurt, West Germany
		Report	Müller; Falkenmayer; Svensson; Tobollik; Kroth; Mohr; Boy	Stadium: Beckerwiese; Attendance: 650; Referee: Wujanz

16 January 1985	SG Dielheim (West Germany)	1–9	(West Germany) Eintracht Frankfurt	West Germany
	Saller 70'	Report	Müller 4', 41'; Falkenmayer 19'; Tobollik 25', 38', 49'; Kroth 51'; Friz 64', 89'	Attendance: 700

19 January 1985	Heilbronn XI (West Germany)	1–2	(West Germany) Eintracht Frankfurt	West Germany
	Haberer 85'	Report	Müller 28'; Tobollik 45'	Attendance: 1,500; Referee: Geyer

23 January 1985	FV Lauda (West Germany)	0–1	(West Germany) Eintracht Frankfurt	Hardheim, West Germany
		Report	Kroth 30'	Attendance: 750

27 January 1985	FC Hanau 93 (West Germany)	v	(West Germany) Eintracht Frankfurt	Hanau, West Germany
		Report
Note: Match called off.

12 March 1985	TuS Koblenz (West Germany)	2–3	(West Germany) Eintracht Frankfurt	West Germany
	Hoffend 23'; Hannappel 62'	www.eintracht-archiv.de/1984/1985-03-12st.html	Mohr 25'; Berthold 42'; Tobollik 52'	Attendance: 1,100

11 April 1985	Germania Bieber (West Germany)	1–6	(West Germany) Eintracht Frankfurt	West Germany
		Report	Körbel; Sievers; Fruck; Müller; Mohr; Tobollik	Attendance: 600

22 April 1985	Dundee (Scotland)	1–1	(West Germany) Eintracht Frankfurt	Dundee, Scotland
19:30 BST	Hendry 83'	Report	Friz 81'	Stadium: Dens Park; Attendance: 5,000; Referee: Bob Valentine

24 April 1985	Heart of Midlothian (Scotland)	3–1	(West Germany) Eintracht Frankfurt	Edinburgh, Scotland
	Clark 15'; McNaughton 74'; J Robertson 80'	Report	Kraaz 42'	Stadium: Tynecastle Park; Attendance: 5,009

15 May 1985	Tunisia national team	1–2	(West Germany) Eintracht Frankfurt	Tunis, Tunisia
	Goal	Report	Friz; Kraaz	Attendance: 2,000

20 May 1985	Nidderau XI (West Germany)	0–11	(West Germany) Eintracht Frankfurt	Nidderau, West Germany
		Report	Berthold 9'; Kroth 10', 14'; Mohr 17', 30', 70', 83'; Friz 36'; Tobollik 45'; Müller 67'; Sievers 87'	Attendance: 1,200; Referee: Altvater

28 May 1985	Giessen / Marburg XI (West Germany)	2–2	(West Germany) Eintracht Frankfurt	Alsfeld, West Germany
	Plonka 14', 54'	Report	Müller 82'; Fruck 87'	Attendance: 1,700

10 June 1985	Viktoria Sindlingen (West Germany)	2–2	(West Germany) Eintracht Frankfurt	Frankfurt, West Germany
	Grabitsch 61'; Rodler 84'	www.eintracht-archiv.de/1984/1985-06-10st.html	Rieth 6'; Tobollik 77'	Attendance: 1,500; Referee: Welz

12 June 1985	Fulda XI (West Germany)	0–10	(West Germany) Eintracht Frankfurt	Fulda, West Germany
		Report	Marijan Vucak 17'; Friz 25'; Mohr 26'; Svensson 33', 58', 61'; Körbel 39'; Kroth 44', 84'; Müller 78'	Stadium: Aschenberg; Attendance: 1,400; Referee: Sauerbier

16 June 1985	SG Ober-Erlenbach (West Germany)	1–2	(West Germany) Eintracht Frankfurt	Bad Homburg, West Germany
	Martin Kraus 76'	Report	Tobollik 19'; Binz 61'	Attendance: 1,000

17 June 1985	Alemannia Niedermittlau (West Germany)	2–17	(West Germany) Eintracht Frankfurt	Hasselroth, West Germany
	Goal	Report	Gruner; Wöber; Binz; Kroth; Fruck; Tobollik	Attendance: 1,600

19 June 1985	Augsburg XI (West Germany)	3–2	(West Germany) Eintracht Frankfurt	Augsburg, West Germany
	Kindermann 8'; Haller 65'; Hochstätter 73'	Report	Svensson 43'; Tobollik 58'	Attendance: 7,000

=== Bundesliga ===
==== League fixtures and results ====
24 August 1984 1	VfL Bochum	3–3	Eintracht Frankfurt	Bochum, West Germany
20:00 CEST	Fischer 1', 63'; Schulz 48'	Report	Trieb 22', 29'; Kraaz 72'	Stadium: Ruhrstadion; Attendance: 22,000; Referee: Heinz Werner

28 August 1984 2	Eintracht Frankfurt	2–0	Bayer Leverkusen	Frankfurt, West Germany
20:00 CEST	Tobollik 27'; Sievers 34'	Report		Stadium: Waldstadion; Attendance: 24,000; Referee: Gerd Zimmermann

7 September 1984 3	Karlsruher SC	2–2	Eintracht Frankfurt	Karlsruhe, West Germany
20:00 CEST	Günther 85'; Kraaz 88' (o.g.)	Report	Müller 74'; Svensson 79'	Stadium: Wildparkstadion; Attendance: 26,000; Referee: Hans Wahmann

15 September 1984 4	Eintracht Frankfurt	1–1	1. FC Kaiserslautern	Frankfurt, West Germany
15:30 CEST	Tobollik 76'	Report	T Allofs 86'	Stadium: Waldstadion; Attendance: 27,000; Referee: Karl-Josef Assenmacher

21 September 1984 5	Eintracht Braunschweig	5–0	Eintracht Frankfurt	Braunschweig, West Germany
20:00 CEST	Bruns 11'; Gorski 27'; Tripbacher 53', 81'; Worm 61'	Report		Stadium: Stadion an der Hamburger Straße; Attendance: 12,000; Referee: Manfred Uhlig

28 September 1984 6	Eintracht Frankfurt	3–0	Arminia Bielefeld	Frankfurt, West Germany
20:00 CEST	Kroth 18'; Sievers 65'; Krämer 90'	Report		Stadium: Waldstadion; Attendance: 15,000; Referee: Manfred Schlup

6 October 1984 7	Werder Bremen	3–3	Eintracht Frankfurt	Bremen, West Germany
15:30 CEST	Pezzey 24', 90'; Möhlmann 43'	Report	Trieb 45'; Berthold 59'; Krämer 77'	Stadium: Weserstadion; Attendance: 15,000; Referee: Joachim Kautschor

10 October 1984 8	Eintracht Frankfurt	3–2	Bayer 05 Uerdingen	Frankfurt, West Germany
20:00 CEST	Berthold 26', 37'; Mohr 43'	Report	Schäfer 48'; F Funkel 53'	Stadium: Waldstadion; Attendance: 22,000; Referee: Hans-Joachim Osmers

20 October 1984 9	Bayern Munich	4–2	Eintracht Frankfurt	Munich, West Germany
15:30 CEST	Wohlfarth 9', 42'; M Rummenigge 39'; Matthäus 82'	Report	Berthold 48'; Kroth 86'	Stadium: Olympiastadion; Attendance: 36,000; Referee: Werner Schütte

27 October 1984 10	Eintracht Frankfurt	1–4	1. FC Köln	Frankfurt, West Germany
15:30 CEST	Svensson 88'	Report	Bein 14', 60'; Engels 80'; Lehnhoff 33'	Stadium: Waldstadion; Attendance: 35,000; Referee: Robert Walz

2 November 1984 11	VfB Stuttgart	4–2	Eintracht Frankfurt	Stuttgart, West Germany
20:00 CEST	Klinsmann 20', 56'; Claesen 28'; Reichert 85'	Report	Krämer 41'; Mohr 60'	Stadium: Neckarstadion; Attendance: 27,000; Referee: Aron Schmidhuber

10 November 1984 12	Eintracht Frankfurt	7–2	SV Waldhof Mannheim	Frankfurt, West Germany
15:30 CEST	Krämer 7', 76', 84'; Kroth 9', 40'; Müller 13', 89'	Report	Heck 44'; Dickgießer 58'	Stadium: Waldstadion; Attendance: 20,000; Referee: Rüdiger Wuttke

14 November 1984 13	Fortuna Düsseldorf	3–1	Eintracht Frankfurt	Düsseldorf, West Germany
20:00 CEST	Holmqvist 2'; Thiele 68'; Fleer 71' (pen.)	Report	Krämer 20'	Stadium: Rheinstadion; Attendance: 5,500; Referee: Hans-Peter Dellwing

17 November 1984 14	Eintracht Frankfurt	2–1	Borussia Dortmund	Frankfurt, West Germany
15:30 CEST	Storck 5'	Report	Svensson 20'; Storck 72' (o.g.)	Stadium: Waldstadion; Attendance: 15,000; Referee: Wolf-Günter Wiesel

24 November 1984 15	FC Schalke 04	1–3	Eintracht Frankfurt	Gelsenkirchen, West Germany
15:30 CEST	Schatzschneider 33'	Report	Kroth 56'; Tobollik 72' (pen.); Fruck (red card) 78'; Svensson 88'	Stadium: Parkstadion; Attendance: 18,000; Referee: Wolf-Rüdiger Umbach

1 December 1984 16	Hamburger SV	2–0	Eintracht Frankfurt	Hamburg, West Germany
15:30 CEST	Milewski 69'; von Heesen 81'	Report		Stadium: Volksparkstadion; Attendance: 17,000; Referee: Wolf-Dieter Ahlenfelder

8 December 1984 17	Eintracht Frankfurt	1–1	Borussia Mönchengladbach	Frankfurt, West Germany
15:30 CEST	Tobollik 62'	Report	Bruns 32'	Stadium: Waldstadion; Attendance: 40,000; Referee: Karl-Heinz Tritschler

2 February 1985 18	Eintracht Frankfurt	1–1	VfL Bochum	Frankfurt, West Germany
15:30 CEST	Sievers 38'	Report	Fischer 33'	Stadium: Waldstadion; Attendance: 16,000; Referee: Volker Roth

16 February 1985 20	Eintracht Frankfurt	4–2	Karlsruher SC	Frankfurt, West Germany
15:30 CEST	Tobollik 24'; Kroth 39'; Svensson 59'; Krämer 80'	Report	Theiss 19' (pen.); Künast 40'	Stadium: Waldstadion; Attendance: 11,000; Referee: Werner Schütte

2 March 1985 21	1. FC Kaiserslautern	2–1	Eintracht Frankfurt	Kaiserslautern, West Germany
15:30 CEST	Hübner 10'; Allofs 40'	Report	Krämer 52'	Stadium: Betzenbergstadion; Attendance: 13,500; Referee: Joachim Kautschor

5 March 1985 19	Bayer Leverkusen	3–1	Eintracht Frankfurt	Leverkusen, West Germany
20:00 CEST	Winklhofer 39'; Cha 49'; Schreier 57'	Report	Svensson 76'	Stadium: Ulrich-Haberland-Stadion; Attendance: 8,000; Referee: Anton Matheis

9 March 1985 22	Eintracht Frankfurt	2–0	Eintracht Braunschweig	Frankfurt, West Germany
15:30 CEST	Berthold 44'; Krämer 60'	Report		Stadium: Waldstadion; Attendance: 12,000; Referee: Werner Föckler

16 March 1985 23	Arminia Bielefeld	2–2	Eintracht Frankfurt	Bielefeld, West Germany
15:30 CEST	Kühlhorn 22'; Kneib 89' (pen.)	Report	Sievers 52'; Müller 79'	Stadium: Stadion Alm; Attendance: 11,500; Referee: Wolf-Günter Wiesel

23 March 1985 24	Eintracht Frankfurt	1–3	Werder Bremen	Frankfurt, West Germany
15:30 CEST	Müller 14'	Report	Meier 44'; Okudera 47'; Völler 84'	Stadium: Waldstadion; Attendance: 30,000; Referee: Hans Wahmann

30 March 1985 25	Bayer 05 Uerdingen	1–1	Eintracht Frankfurt	Krefeld, West Germany
15:30 CEST	W Funkel 55'	Report	Müller 65'	Stadium: Grotenburg-Stadion; Attendance: 11,000; Referee: Hans-Heinrich Barnick

3 April 1985 26	Eintracht Frankfurt	2–2	Bayern Munich	Frankfurt, West Germany
20:00 CEST	Berthold 49'; Tobollik 69'	Report	Rummenigge 80'; Eder 85'	Stadium: Waldstadion; Attendance: 65,000; Referee: Karl-Josef Assenmacher

13 April 1985 27	1. FC Köln	2–0	Eintracht Frankfurt	Cologne, West Germany
15:30 CEST	Bein 28'; Engels 36'	Report		Stadium: Müngersdorfer Stadion; Attendance: 12,000; Referee: Peter Gabor

20 April 1985 28	Eintracht Frankfurt	2–0	VfB Stuttgart	Frankfurt, West Germany
15:30 CEST	Kraaz 62'; Tobollik 75'	Report		Stadium: Waldstadion; Attendance: 18,000; Referee: Dieter Niebergall

4 May 1985 29	SV Waldhof Mannheim	3–1	Eintracht Frankfurt	Ludwigshafen, West Germany
20:00 CEST	Kohler 27'; Tsionanis 38'; Schön 58'	Report	Fruck 48' (pen.)	Stadium: Südweststadion; Attendance: 18,000; Referee: Hans Scheuerer

10 May 1985 30	Eintracht Frankfurt	1–2	Fortuna Düsseldorf	Frankfurt, West Germany
20:00 CEST	Friz 13', 74'	Report	Fach 85'; Dusend 90'	Stadium: Waldstadion; Attendance: 12,000; Referee: Gerhard Theobald

18 May 1985 31	Borussia Dortmund	2–1	Eintracht Frankfurt	Dortmund, West Germany
15:30 CEST	Rüssmann 12'; Răducanu 86'	Report	Mohr 59'	Stadium: Westfalenstadion; Attendance: 18,500; Referee: Wolf Umbach

24 May 1985 32	Eintracht Frankfurt	1–1	FC Schalke 04	Frankfurt, West Germany
20:00 CEST	Körbel 75'	Report	Jakobs 68'	Stadium: Waldstadion; Attendance: 19,000; Referee: Gerd Zimmermann

1 June 1985 33	Eintracht Frankfurt	1–0	Hamburger SV	Frankfurt, West Germany
15:30 CEST	Berthold 54'	Report		Stadium: Waldstadion; Attendance: 21,000; Referee: Wolf-Dieter Ahlenfelder

8 June 1985 34	Borussia Mönchengladbach	3–3	Eintracht Frankfurt	Mönchengladbach, West Germany
15:30 CEST	Bruns 25', 79'; Rahn 78'	Report	Tobollik 2', 85'; Mohr 42'	Stadium: Bökelbergstadion; Attendance: 8,500; Referee: Winfried Walz

==== League table ====
Pos	Team	Pld	W	D	L	GF	GA	GD	Pts
10	VfB Stuttgart	34	14	5	15	79	59	+20	33
11	1. FC Kaiserslautern	34	11	11	12	56	60	−4	33
12	Eintracht Frankfurt	34	10	12	12	62	67	−5	32
13	Bayer Leverkusen	34	9	13	12	52	54	−2	31
14	Borussia Dortmund	34	13	4	17	51	65	−14	30

Source: www.dfb.de
Rules for classification: 1) points; 2) goal difference; 3) number of goals scored.

==== Results summary ====
Source: Bundesliga

==== Results by round ====
Round	1	2	3	4	5	6	7	8	9	10	11	12	13	14	15	16	17	18	19	20	21	22	23	24	25	26	27	28	29	30	31	32	33	34
Ground	A	H	A	H	A	H	A	H	A	H	A	H	A	H	A	A	H	H	A	H	A	H	A	H	A	H	A	H	A	H	A	H	H	A
Result	D	W	D	D	L	W	D	W	L	L	L	W	L	W	W	L	D	D	L	W	L	W	D	L	D	D	L	W	L	D	W	D	W	D
Position	10	2	6	5	10	7	7	4	9	12	13	11	12	10	9	9	10	10	11	11	11	11	10	11	11	11	13	11	13	13	13	13	11	12

A = Away; H = Home; W = Win; D = Draw; L = Loss

=== DFB-Pokal ===
1 September 1984 1st Round	Eintracht Braunschweig	1–3	Eintracht Frankfurt	Braunschweig, West Germany
15:30 CEST	Lux 76' (pen.)	Report	Falkenmayer 29'; Müller 44'; Tobollik 58'	Stadium: Stadion an der Hamburger Straße; Attendance: 7,500; Referee: Udo Horeis

21 November 1984 2nd Round	Borussia Mönchengladbach	4–2 (a.e.t.)	Eintracht Frankfurt	Mönchengladbach, West Germany
15:30 CEST	Criens 1'; Rahn 64' (pen.); Krauss 102'; Lienen 105'	Report	Körbel 34'; Müller 86'	Stadium: Bökelbergstadion; Attendance: 20,000; Referee: Wilfried Heitmann

=== Indoor soccer tournament (Portas-Cup) ===
26-28 December 1984 1st Match	Eintracht Frankfurt	7–6	Amateurs XI	Frankfurt, West Germany
	Goal	Report	Goal	Stadium: Festhalle; Attendance: 13,000

26-28 December 1984 2nd Match	Eintracht Frankfurt	7–8	Kickers Offenbach	Frankfurt, West Germany
	Goal	Report	Goal	Stadium: Festhalle; Attendance: 13,000

==== Group Stage Table ====
Pos	Team	Pld	W	D	L	GF	GA	GD	Pts
1	Eintracht Frankfurt	2	1	0	1	14	14	0	2
2	Kickers Offenbach	2	1	1	0	13	12	+1	3
3	Amateurs XI	2	0	1	1	11	12	−1	1

Source: eintracht-archiv.de
Rules for classification: 1) Points

26-28 December 1984 Final Round 1st Match	Eintracht Frankfurt	9–4	SpVgg Bad Homburg	Frankfurt, West Germany
	Goal	Report	Goal	Stadium: Festhalle; Attendance: 13,000

26-28 December 1984 Final Round 2nd Match	Eintracht Frankfurt	6–2	1. FC Kaiserslautern	Frankfurt, West Germany
	Goal	Report	Goal	Stadium: Festhalle; Attendance: 13,000

26-28 December 1984 Final Round 3rd Match	Eintracht Frankfurt	8–1	Kickers Offenbach	Frankfurt, West Germany
	Goal	Report	Goal	Stadium: Festhalle; Attendance: 13,000

==== Final Stage Table ====
Pos	Team	Pld	W	D	L	GF	GA	GD	Pts
1	Eintracht Frankfurt	3	3	0	0	23	7	+16	6
2	Kickers Offenbach	3	2	0	1	16	15	+1	4
3	1. FC Kaiserslautern	3	1	0	2	11	13	−2	2
4	SpVgg Bad Homburg	3	0	0	3	8	23	−15	0

Source: eintracht-archiv.de
Rules for classification: 1) Points

== Squad ==
=== Squad and statistics ===
No.	Pos	Nat	Player	Total		Bundesliga		DFB-Pokal	
No.	Pos	Nat	Player	Apps	Goals	Apps	Goals	Apps	Goals
	GK	(West Germany) FRG	Hans-Jürgen Gundelach	10	0	10	0	0	0
	GK	(East Germany) GDR	Jürgen Pahl	27	0	25	0	2	0
	DF	(West Germany) FRG	Thomas Berthold	32	7	30	7	2	0
	DF	(West Germany) FRG	Manfred Binz	3	0	3	0	0	0
	DF	(West Germany) FRG	Hans-Peter Boy	16	0	16	0	0	0
	DF	(West Germany) FRG	Alexander Conrad	2	0	2	0	0	0
	DF	(West Germany) FRG	Norbert Fruck	17	1	16	1	1	0
	DF	(West Germany) FRG	Charly Körbel	33	3	32	2	1	1
	DF	(West Germany) FRG	Armin Kraaz	32	2	31	2	1	0
	DF	(Poland) POL	Bogusław Kwiecień (Note: Bogusław Kwiecień was signed from Stal Mielec and had to sit out a one year playing ban that used to be common for transfers from Warsaw Pact countries. In 1986, Kwiecień changed his name to Wolfgang April which is a naturalised version of his Polish birth name.)	0	0	0	0	0	0
	DF	(West Germany) FRG	Ralf Sievers	33	4	31	4	2	0
	DF	(West Germany) FRG	Martin Trieb	23	3	21	3	2	0
	MF	(West Germany) FRG	Ralf Falkenmayer	25	1	23	0	2	1
	MF	(West Germany) FRG	Thomas Kroth	25	6	23	6	2	0
	MF	(West Germany) FRG	Jürgen Mohr	30	4	29	4	1	0
	FW	(West Germany) FRG	Holger Friz	6	2	6	2	0	0
	FW	(West Germany) FRG	Harald Krämer	18	10	17	10	1	0
	FW	(West Germany) FRG	Bodo Mattern	3	0	3	0	0	0
	FW	(West Germany) FRG	Uwe Müller	34	8	32	6	2	2
	FW	(Sweden) SWE	Jan Svensson	35	6	33	6	2	0
	FW	(Poland) POL	Cezary Tobollik	31	10	29	9	2	1

=== Transfers ===
In:

No.	Pos.	Nation	Player
—	DF	FRG	Manfred Binz (from Eintracht Frankfurt II)
—	DF	FRG	Alexander Conrad (from Eintracht Frankfurt academy)
—	FW	FRG	Holger Friz (from Eintracht Frankfurt II)
—	GK	FRG	Hans-Jürgen Gundelach (from Eintracht Frankfurt II)
—	DF	POL	Bogusław Kwiecień (from Stal Mielec)

Out:

No.	Pos.	Nation	Player
—	FW	FRG	Ronny Borchers (loaned to Arminia Bielefeld, later sold to Grasshopper Club Zürich)
—	DF	FRG	Dirk Borkenhagen (to Eintracht Frankfurt II)
—	FW	FRG	Jürgen Eymold (to VfL Osnabrück)
—	GK	FRG	Joachim Jüriens (to SSV Ulm 1846)
—	FW	FRG	Thomas Kloss (to Kickers Offenbach)
—	FW	FRG	Bodo Mattern (to Blau-Weiß 90 Berlin)
—	FW	FRG	Dennis Rieth (to Eintracht Frankfurt II)
—	DF	FRG	Uwe Schreml (to Hessen Kassel)
—	MF	FRG	Michael Sziedat (to Hertha BSC)

== Sources ==
- Matheja, Ulrich (2011). Unsere Eintracht - Eintracht Frankfurt - Die Chronik. Die Werkstatt. ISBN 978-3-89533-750-5.
