= 1985–86 Eintracht Frankfurt season =

Eintracht Frankfurt
1985–86 season
- Chairman: Klaus Gramlich
- Manager: Dietrich Weise
- Bundesliga: 15th
- DFB-Pokal: 1st Round
- Top goalscorer: League: Klaus Theiss (7); All: Klaus Theiss (7)
- Highest home attendance: 50,000 29 March 1986 v Bayern Munich (league)
- Lowest home attendance: 8,000 19 November 1985 v Hannover 96 and 8 February 1986 v VfL Bochum (league)
- Average home league attendance: 17,000

The 1985–86 Eintracht Frankfurt season was the 86th season in the club's football history. In 1985–86 the club played in the Bundesliga, the top tier of German football. It was the club's 23rd season in the Bundesliga.

== Matches ==
=== Legend ===
Win Draw Loss Postponed

=== Friendlies ===
19 July 1985	Sportfreunde Herdorf (West Germany)	0–8	(West Germany) Eintracht Frankfurt	West Germany
		Report	Körbel 15'; Berthold 25', 83'; Sarroca 28', 90'; Trieb 58'; Krämer 84', 87'	Attendance: 2,000

21 July 1985	Viktoria Schaafheim (West Germany)	1–10	(West Germany) Eintracht Frankfurt	Schaafheim, West Germany
	Brenner 71'	Report	Krämer 12', 24', 28', 48', 49'; Trieb 29', 70'; Müller 59'; Bühler 75'; Sarroca 87'	Attendance: 2,100

23 July 1985	Hessen Kassel (West Germany)	0–3	(West Germany) Eintracht Frankfurt	Kassel, West Germany
		Report	Trieb 2'; Bühler 47'; Theiss 69' (pen.)	Stadium: Auestadion; Attendance: 4,500; Referee: Jank

25 July 1985	TSV Gemünden XI (West Germany)	2–4	(West Germany) Eintracht Frankfurt	Gemünden, West Germany
18:30 CEST	Brück 29', 64'	Report	Trieb 15'; Berthold 25'; Müller 62'; Svensson 78'	Attendance: 2,000; Referee: Schneider

27 July 1985	Alemannia Gedern (West Germany)	1–9	(West Germany) Eintracht Frankfurt	Gedern, West Germany
	Kraus 39' (pen.)	Report	Berthold 27', 32', 79'; Fruck 33', 61'; Trieb 42'; Müller 46'; Svensson 54'; Theiss 56' (pen.)	Attendance: 2,500

29 July 1985	TSV Bellersheim (West Germany)	0–5	(West Germany) Eintracht Frankfurt	West Germany
		Report	Kraaz 38'; Müller 41', 55'; Trieb 61'; Bühler 75'	Attendance: 1,650

30 July 1985	FSV Bad Orb (West Germany)	1–6	(West Germany) Eintracht Frankfurt	West Germany
	Jettling 80' (pen.)	Report	Svensson 10'; Kwiecień 53', 61'; Fruck 60'; Krämer 68'; Körbel 89'	Attendance: 2,200

31 July 1985	SV Hermannstein (West Germany)	0–9	(West Germany) Eintracht Frankfurt	West Germany
		Report	Kwiecień 28'; Körbel 50'; Trieb 59', 78'; Theiss 61'; Müller 63'; Friz 65'; Binz 79', 83'	Attendance: 1,700

2 August 1985	Eintracht Frankfurt (West Germany)	2–0	(Scotland) Dundee	Frankfurt, West Germany
20:00 CEST	Krämer 71'; Theiss 78' (pen.)	Report		Stadium: Waldstadion; Attendance: 3,000; Referee: Boos

4 August 1985	Rot-Weiß Walldorf (West Germany)	3–9	(West Germany) Eintracht Frankfurt	Mörfelden-Walldorf, West Germany
	B Kornhuber 22'; G Kornhuber 45'; Zensner 63'	Report	Krämer 8'; Trieb 23', 28'; Kwiecień 31'; Müller 38', 72'; Körbel 41'; Theiss 82'; Bühler 88'	Attendance: 1,000; Referee: Beck

6 August 1985	SV Hattersheim (West Germany)	1–9	(West Germany) Eintracht Frankfurt	Hattersheim, West Germany
	Pastor 79'	Report	Körbel 9'; Krämer 34'; Bühler 36'; Theiss 47' (pen.); Svensson 60', 64'; Berthold 65'; Sarroca 73'; Fruck 81'	Attendance: 2,100; Referee: Meffert

13 August 1985	SpVgg Griesheim 02 (West Germany)	1–3	(West Germany) Eintracht Frankfurt	West Germany
	Schneider 83'	Report	Trieb 8'; Theiss 32'; Fruck 62'	Attendance: 2,500; Referee: Löber

27 August 1985	Germania Ober-Roden (West Germany)	1–9	(West Germany) Eintracht Frankfurt	West Germany
	Piesker 59'	Report	Trieb 40'; Krämer 43'; Sarroca 47'; Theiss 56', 63'; Svensson 61', 88'; Müller 77'; Conrad 85'	Attendance: 1,600; Referee: Stork

17 September 1985	Germania Nieder-Mockstadt (West Germany)	3–9	(West Germany) Eintracht Frankfurt	Florstadt, West Germany
	Eichenauer 7' (pen.); Schleiter 39'; Fischer 81'	Report	Müller 24', 35'; Krämer 45', 55' (pen.); Trieb 57'; Berthold 63'; Theiss 77'; Falkenmayer 87'; Svensson 88'	Attendance: 1,200; Referee: Hess

24 September 1985	EFC Kronberg (West Germany)	1–9	(West Germany) Eintracht Frankfurt	Kronberg, West Germany
18:00 CEST	Herr 57'	Report	Müller 17', 79'; Sievers 20', 43', 63'; Krämer 23', 53'; Sarroca 45', 77'	Stadium: Stadion Le-Lavandou-Straße; Attendance: 1,000; Referee: Boos

1 October 1985	Hanauer FC 93 (West Germany)	1–7	(West Germany) Eintracht Frankfurt	Hanau, West Germany
	Müller 84' (pen.)	Report	Svensson 44'; Berthold 47', 57'; Krämer 50', 53'; Friz 55'; Bühler 65'	Attendance: 700; Referee: Orschel

19 October 1985	SV Darmstadt 98 (West Germany)	0–0	(West Germany) Eintracht Frankfurt	Darmstadt, West Germany
15:30 CEST		Report		Stadium: Stadion am Böllenfalltor; Attendance: 1,700; Referee: Boos

27 October 1985	Bayern Hof (West Germany)	1–6	(West Germany) Eintracht Frankfurt	Hof, West Germany
	Rauch	Report	Theiss; Svensson; Bühler; Kwiecień; Sarroca; Körbel	Attendance: 2,200

5 January 1986	Germania Dörnigheim (West Germany)	0–5	(West Germany) Eintracht Frankfurt	West Germany
		Report	Falkenmayer 17'; Trieb 26'; Krämer 34', 80'; Friz 85'	Attendance: 900; Referee: Hessenthaler

8 January 1986	FC Dossenheim (West Germany)	0–10	(West Germany) Eintracht Frankfurt	Dossenheim, West Germany
		Report	Fruck 23'; Bühler 26', 27'; Falkenmayer 41'; Krämer 48', 70'; Trieb 76'; Körbel 82'; Kitzmann 84', 90'	Attendance: 1,000; Referee: Becker

12 January 1986	TSV Tauberbischofsheim (West Germany)	1–6	(West Germany) Eintracht Frankfurt	West Germany
	Schlachter 71'	Report	Krämer 3'; Kitzmann 15', 39'; Sievers 24'; Svensson 47'; Sarroca 76'	Attendance: 1,000; Referee: Wittke

18 January 1986	Rödelheimer FC 02 (West Germany)	0–5	(West Germany) Eintracht Frankfurt	Frankfurt, West Germany
		Report	Svensson 17'; Caspary 59'; Bühler 66'; Krämer 81'; Sarroca 85'	Attendance: 300; Referee: Herr

21 January 1986	TSG Eintracht Plankstadt (West Germany)	1–5	(West Germany) Eintracht Frankfurt	Plankstadt, West Germany
	Kirsch 69'	Report	Krämer 6', 63'; Svensson 14'; Friz 82', 89'	Attendance: 800

8 April 1986	SV Seulberg (West Germany)	2–14	(West Germany) Eintracht Frankfurt	West Germany
	Kumpf 31'; K Müller 52' (pen.)	Report	Möller 4'; Krämer 13', 17', 27', 37', 41' (pen.), 54', 60', 77', 80'; Walz 45'; Mitchell 79', 86'; Bühler 85'	Attendance: 400; Referee: Hartmann

1 May 1986	VfR 07 Limburg (West Germany)	1–8	(West Germany) Eintracht Frankfurt	Limburg, West Germany
	Stein 68'	Report	Mitchell 12', 48', 55', 81'; Falkenmayer 27'; Müller; Sievers; Sarroca 69'	Attendance: 700

5 May 1986	SG Bad Soden (West Germany)	0–8	(West Germany) Eintracht Frankfurt	West Germany
		Report	Mitchell 6'; Krämer 35', 56', 80'; Friz 62'; Reubold 73', 82'; Müller 83'	Attendance: 600; Referee: Wilbick

13 May 1986	Eintracht Frankfurt (West Germany)	1–5	Poland	Mörfelden-Walldorf, West Germany
	Sarroca 77'	Report	Boniek 12'; Zgutczyński 52'; Prusik 75'; Tarasiewicz 82', 88'	Stadium: Waldstadion Mörfelden; Attendance: 4,500; Referee: Brückner

17 May 1986	TuS 03 Weilmünster (West Germany)	0–8	(West Germany) Eintracht Frankfurt	West Germany
		Report	Sievers 8'; Falkenmayer 15' (pen.), 53'; Sarroca 35', 39', 68'; Theiss 57', 75'	Attendance: 700; Referee: Heil

20 May 1986	BSV Weißenthurm (West Germany)	0–3	(West Germany) Eintracht Frankfurt	West Germany
		Report	Theiss 10'; Binz 81'; Friz 89'	Attendance: 326

22 May 1986	Germania Enkheim (West Germany)	0–5	(West Germany) Eintracht Frankfurt	West Germany
		Report	Lauf 54', 61', 63'; Reubold 69'; Sarroca 71'	Attendance: 1,783; Referee: Crass

24 May 1986	Hesse XI (West Germany)	0–1	(West Germany) Eintracht Frankfurt	Grünberg, West Germany
		Report	Sarroca 12'	Stadium: Sportplatz Sportschule Grünberg; Attendance: 1,700; Referee: Heß

26 May 1986	TSV Amorbach (West Germany)	2–12	(West Germany) Eintracht Frankfurt	Amorbach, West Germany
	Schmelzer 25'; Grimm 86'	Report	Mitchell 13'; Falkenmayer 14', 54' (pen.); Fruck 21'; Sarroca 26', 31'; Friz 39'; Theiss 40', 80'; Reubold 64'; Pahl 82', 88'	Stadium: Odenwald-Stadion; Attendance: 900

28 May 1986	FV 09 Okarben (West Germany)	1–8	(West Germany) Eintracht Frankfurt	Karben, West Germany
	Goal	Report	Möller; Lauf; Friz; Mitchell; Hudert; Kehl (o.g.)	Attendance: 800

30 May 1986	Germania Müs (West Germany)	1–6	(West Germany) Eintracht Frankfurt	West Germany
	Esany 76'	Report	Lauf 22', 37'; Falkenmayer 36' (pen.); Friz 45'; Sarroca 52'; Theiss 78'	Attendance: 1,100; Referee: Grosch

=== Bundesliga ===
==== League fixtures and results ====
10 August 1985 1	1. FC Köln	1–1	Eintracht Frankfurt	Cologne, West Germany
15:30 CEST	K Allofs 64' (pen.)	Report	Theiss 72' (pen.)	Stadium: Müngersdorfer Stadion; Attendance: 16,000; Referee: Matheis

17 August 1985 2	Eintracht Frankfurt	1–1	1. FC Nürnberg	Frankfurt, West Germany
15:30 CEST	Krämer 83'	Report	Eckstein 4'	Stadium: Waldstadion; Attendance: 24,000; Referee: Assenmacher

17 August 1985 3	Fortuna Düsseldorf	0–1	Eintracht Frankfurt	Düsseldorf, West Germany
20:00 CEST		Report	Krämer 65'	Stadium: Rheinstadion; Attendance: 12,000; Referee: Heitmann

31 August 1985 4	Eintracht Frankfurt	0–0	SV Waldhof Mannheim	Frankfurt, West Germany
15:30 CEST		Report		Stadium: Waldstadion; Attendance: 18,000; Referee: M Weber

3 September 1985 5	VfL Bochum	2–1	Eintracht Frankfurt	Bochum, West Germany
20:00 CEST	Kuntz 54'; Kempe 83'	Report	Krämer 27'	Stadium: Ruhrstadion; Attendance: 10,000; Referee: Horeis

7 September 1985 6	Eintracht Frankfurt	1–1	Bayer Uerdingen	Frankfurt, West Germany
15:30 CEST	Theiss 43' (pen.)	Report	Eðvaldsson 10'	Stadium: Waldstadion; Attendance: 11,500; Referee: Umbach

13 September 1985 7	Eintracht Frankfurt	1–1	1. FC Kaiserslautern	Frankfurt, West Germany
20:00 CEST	Theiss 5' (pen.)	Report	Geye 51'	Stadium: Waldstadion; Attendance: 15,500; Referee: Wahmann

20 September 1986 8	Borussia Dortmund	4–2	Eintracht Frankfurt	Dortmund, West Germany
20:00 CEST	Falkenmayer 48' (o.g.); Hrubesch 64'; Wegmann 88', 89'	Report	Berthold 28'; Trieb (red card) 66'; Bühler 90'	Stadium: Westfalenstadion; Attendance: 16,000; Referee: Dellwing

28 September 1985 9	Eintracht Frankfurt	1–0	Bayer Leverkusen	Frankfurt, West Germany
15:30 CEST	Friz 48'	Report		Stadium: Waldstadion; Attendance: 11,000; Referee: Föckler

5 October 1985 10	Werder Bremen	4–0	Eintracht Frankfurt	Bremen, West Germany
20:00 CEST	Kutzop 21' (pen.); Pezzey 46'; Ordenewitz 71', 83'	Report		Stadium: Weserstadion; Attendance: 21,000; Referee: Bruch

11 October 1985 11	Eintracht Frankfurt	1–1	Borussia Mönchengladbach	Frankfurt, West Germany
20:00 CEST	Sievers 27'	Report	Criens 5'	Stadium: Waldstadion; Attendance: 24,000; Referee: Schmidhuber

26 October 1985 12	Bayern Munich	3–0	Eintracht Frankfurt	Munich, West Germany
15:30 CEST	Wohlfarth 15', 82'; Søren Lerby 63'	Report		Stadium: Olympiastadion; Attendance: 20,000; Referee: Broska

2 November 1985 13	Eintracht Frankfurt	1–1	VfB Stuttgart	Frankfurt, West Germany
15:30 CEST	Theiss 87'	Report	Sigurvinsson 50'	Stadium: Waldstadion; Attendance: 12,000; Referee: Werner

9 November 1985 14	FC Schalke 04	3–1	Eintracht Frankfurt	Gelsenkirchen, West Germany
15:30 CEST	Täuber 20'; Thon 40', 44'	Report	Theiss 43'	Stadium: Parkstadion; Attendance: 15,000; Referee: Osmers

19 November 1985 15	Eintracht Frankfurt	1–3	Hannover 96	Frankfurt, West Germany
20:00 CEST	Sarroca 34'	Report	Baier 66'; Reich 90'; Surmann 90'	Stadium: Waldstadion; Attendance: 8,000; Referee: Matheis

23 November 1985 16	1. FC Saarbrücken	2–2	Eintracht Frankfurt	Saarbrücken, West Germany
15:30 CEST	Jambo 21', 84'	Report	Friz 4'; Sarroca 72'	Stadium: Ludwigsparkstadion; Attendance: 10,000; Referee: Pauly

3 December 1985 17	Eintracht Frankfurt	3–0	Hamburger SV	Frankfurt, West Germany
20:00 CEST	Sievers 37'; Friz 48'; Krämer 86'	Report		Stadium: Waldstadion; Attendance: 15,000; Referee: Uhlig

7 December 1985 18	Eintracht Frankfurt	2–2	1. FC Köln	Frankfurt, West Germany
15:30 CEST	Friz 4'; Kitzmann 17'	Report	Allofs 52'; Bein 81' (pen.)	Stadium: Waldstadion; Attendance: 13,000; Referee: Zimmermann

14 December 1985 19	1. FC Nürnberg	4–1	Eintracht Frankfurt	Nuremberg, West Germany
15:30 CEST	Güttler 29'; Philipkowski 39'; Grahammer 62' (pen.); Brunner 70'	Report	Falkenmayer 25' (pen.)	Stadium: Städtisches Stadion; Attendance: 14,000; Referee: Weber

25 January 1986 20	Eintracht Frankfurt	2–0	Fortuna Düsseldorf	Frankfurt, West Germany
15:30 CEST	Friz 69'; Berthold 90'	Report		Stadium: Waldstadion; Attendance: 10,000; Referee: Horeis

1 February 1986 21	SV Waldhof Mannheim	0–0	Eintracht Frankfurt	Ludwigshafen, West Germany
15:30 CEST		Report		Stadium: Südweststadion; Attendance: 10,000; Referee: Ahlenfelder

8 February 1986 22	Eintracht Frankfurt	1–0	VfL Bochum	Frankfurt, West Germany
15:30 CEST	Theiss 52' (pen.)	Report		Stadium: Waldstadion; Attendance: 8,000; Referee: Barnick

22 February 1986 24	1. FC Kaiserslautern	1–1	Eintracht Frankfurt	Kaiserslautern, West Germany
15:30 CEST	Melzer 24'	Report	Kitzmann 82'	Stadium: Fritz-Walter-Stadion; Attendance: 11,500; Referee: Kautschor

1 March 1986 25	Eintracht Frankfurt	2–1	Borussia Dortmund	Frankfurt, West Germany
15:30 CEST	Körbel 5'; Sarroca 60'	Report	Zorc 22' (pen.)	Stadium: Waldstadion; Attendance: 10,000; Referee: Theobald

15 March 1986 27	Eintracht Frankfurt	0–2	Werder Bremen	Frankfurt, West Germany
15:30 CEST		Report	Hermann 71'; Okudera 90'	Stadium: Waldstadion; Attendance: 27,000; Referee: Broska

22 March 1986 28	Borussia Mönchengladbach	1–1	Eintracht Frankfurt	Mönchengladbach, West Germany
15:30 CEST	Rahn 88'	Report	Sievers 27'	Stadium: Bökelbergstadion; Attendance: 7,500; Referee: Werner

25 March 1986 26	Bayer Leverkusen	2–0	Eintracht Frankfurt	Leverkusen, West Germany
20:00 CEST	Patzke 32'; Waas 84'	Report		Stadium: Ulrich-Haberland-Stadion; Attendance: 8,000; Referee: Matheis

29 March 1986 29	Eintracht Frankfurt	2–2	Bayern Munich	Frankfurt, West Germany
15:30 CEST	Falkenmayer 12'; Svensson 35'	Report	Hoeneß 60'; Wohlfarth 78'	Stadium: Waldstadion; Attendance: 50,000; Referee: Heitmann

5 April 1986 30	VfB Stuttgart	2–1	Eintracht Frankfurt	Stuttgart, West Germany
15:30 CEST	Pašić 3'; Nushöhr 7' (pen.)	Report	Theiss 72' (pen.); Kraaz (red card) 82'	Stadium: Neckarstadion; Attendance: 19,000; Referee: Wahmann

12 April 1986 31	Eintracht Frankfurt	3–0	FC Schalke 04	Frankfurt, West Germany
15:30 CEST	Kitzmann 30'; Svensson 44'; Sarroca 82'	Report		Stadium: Waldstadion; Attendance: 15,000; Referee: Gächter

17 April 1986 32	Hannover 96	0–0	Eintracht Frankfurt	Hanover, West Germany
20:00 CEST		Report		Stadium: Niedersachsenstadion; Attendance: 4,000; Referee: Uhlig

22 April 1986 33	Eintracht Frankfurt	1–3	1. FC Saarbrücken	Frankfurt, West Germany
20:00 CEST	Körbel 56'	Report	Szesni 15'; Mohr 51'; Blättel 88'	Stadium: Waldstadion; Attendance: 8,000; Referee: Ahlenfelder

24 April 1986 23	Bayer Uerdingen	1–0	Eintracht Frankfurt	Krefeld, West Germany
20:00 CEST	Guðmundsson 6'	Report		Stadium: Grotenburg-Stadion; Attendance: 8,500; Referee: Föckler

26 April 1986 34	Hamburger SV	1–0	Eintracht Frankfurt	Hamburg, West Germany
15:30 CEST	Schröder 88'	Report	Svensson (red card) 86'	Stadium: Volksparkstadion; Attendance: 11,500; Referee: Schütte

==== League table ====
Pos	Team	Pld	W	D	L	GF	GA	GD	Pts	Qualification or relegation
13	1. FC Köln	34	9	11	14	46	59	−13	29	
14	Fortuna Düsseldorf	34	11	7	16	54	78	−24	29	
15	Eintracht Frankfurt	34	7	14	13	35	49	−14	28	
16	Borussia Dortmund (O)	34	10	8	16	49	65	−16	28	Qualification to relegation play-offs
17	1. FC Saarbrücken (R)	34	6	9	19	39	68	−29	21	Relegation to 2. Bundesliga

Source: www.dfb.de
Rules for classification: 1) points; 2) goal difference; 3) number of goals scored.
(O) Play-off winners; (R) Relegated

==== Results summary ====
Overall								Home						Away					
Pld	W	D	L	GF	GA	GD	Pts	W	D	L	GF	GA	GD	W	D	L	GF	GA	GD
34	7	14	13	35	49	−14	28	6	8	3	23	18	+5	1	6	10	12	31	−19

Source: Bundesliga

==== Results by round ====
Round	1	2	3	4	5	6	7	8	9	10	11	12	13	14	15	16	17	18	19	20	21	22	23	24	25	26	27	28	29	30	31	32	33	34
Ground	A	H	A	H	A	H	H	A	H	A	H	A	H	A	H	A	H	H	A	H	A	H	A	A	H	A	H	A	H	A	H	A	H	A
Result	D	D	W	D	L	D	D	L	W	L	D	L	D	L	L	D	W	D	L	W	D	W	L	D	W	L	L	D	D	L	W	D	L	L
Position	7	9	6	7	12	11	13	12	10	11	11	13	13	14	16	15	13	14	15	14	13	10	12	12	11	12	12	13	14	14	12	11	13	15

Source: Unsere Eintracht - Eintracht Frankfurt - Die Chronik
A = Away; H = Home; W = Win; D = Draw; L = Loss

=== DFB-Pokal ===
24 August 1985 1st Round	1. FC Kaiserslautern	3–1	Eintracht Frankfurt	Kaiserslautern, West Germany
	Brehme 33'; T Allofs 81'; Trunk 84'	Report	Berthold 7'	Stadium: Betzenbergstadion; Attendance: 11,500; Referee: Ermer

=== Indoor soccer tournament (Frankfurt Cup) ===
27 December 1985 1st Match	Eintracht Frankfurt	0–2	FSV Frankfurt	Frankfurt, West Germany
		Report	Kupfer; Mintgen	Stadium: Festhalle; Attendance: 4,500

27 December 1985 2nd Match	Eintracht Frankfurt	1–2	Hamburger SV	Frankfurt, West Germany
	Kitzmann	Report	Lux; Plessers	Stadium: Festhalle; Attendance: 4,500

27 December 1985 3rd Match	Eintracht Frankfurt	4–2	FC Rhein-Main	Frankfurt, West Germany
	Krämer; Kitzmann; Sarroca; Friz	Report	Emmerich; Kremers	Stadium: Festhalle; Attendance: 4,500

27 December 1985 4th Match	Eintracht Frankfurt	3–2	Amateurs XI	Frankfurt, West Germany
	Kitzmann; Friz; Sarroca	Report	Zeh; Strack	Stadium: Festhalle; Attendance: 4,500

27 December 1985 5th Match	Eintracht Frankfurt	3–2	Kickers Offenbach	Frankfurt, West Germany
	Kitzmann; Sievers; Müller	Report	Eichhorn	Stadium: Festhalle; Attendance: 4,500

28 December 1985 6th Match	Eintracht Frankfurt	2–1	Amateurs XI	Frankfurt, West Germany
	Müller; Sarroca	Report	Strack	Stadium: Festhalle; Attendance: 6,000

28 December 1985 7th Match	Eintracht Frankfurt	8–1	FC Rhein-Main	Frankfurt, West Germany
	Kitzmann; Trieb; Sievers; Müller; Fruck; Sarroca	Report	Hölzenbein	Stadium: Festhalle; Attendance: 6,000

28 December 1985 8th Match	Eintracht Frankfurt	2–3	FSV Frankfurt	Frankfurt, West Germany
	Müller; Sarroca	Report	Bär; Weigert	Stadium: Festhalle; Attendance: 6,000

28 December 1985 9th Match	Eintracht Frankfurt	4–2	Kickers Offenbach	Frankfurt, West Germany
	Körbel; Binz; Trieb; Sievers	Report	Brummer; Müller (o.g.)	Stadium: Festhalle; Attendance: 6,000

28 December 1985 10th Match	Eintracht Frankfurt	1–2	Hamburger SV	Frankfurt, West Germany
	Trieb	Report	Gründel; Rolff	Stadium: Festhalle; Attendance: 6,000

==== Table ====
Pos	Team	Pld	W	D	L	GF	GA	GD	Pts
1	Hamburger SV	10	9	1	0	40	10	+30	19
2	Eintracht Frankfurt	10	6	0	4	27	19	+8	12
3	FSV Frankfurt	10	4	1	5	22	23	−1	9
4	Amateurs XI	10	4	0	6	21	29	−8	8
5	Kickers Offenbach	10	2	3	5	21	29	−8	7
6	FC Rhein-Main	10	1	3	6	23	44	−21	5

Source: eintracht-archiv.de
Rules for classification: 1) Points

=== Indoor soccer tournament (Stuttgart Cup) ===
1 January 1976 1st Match	Eintracht Frankfurt	3–4	FC Wacker Innsbruck	Stuttgart, West Germany
	Kitzmann; Fruck; Krämer	Report	Goal	Stadium: Hanns-Martin-Schleyer-Halle; Attendance: 8,000

2 January 1976 2nd Match	VfB Stuttgart	4–2	Eintracht Frankfurt	Stuttgart, West Germany
	Goal	Report	Kitzmann; Svensson	Stadium: Hanns-Martin-Schleyer-Halle; Attendance: 8,000

3 January 1976 3rd Match	Stuttgarter Kickers	3–6	Eintracht Frankfurt	Stuttgart, West Germany
	Goal	Report	Krämer; Fruck; Kitzmann; Svensson; (o.g.)	Stadium: Hanns-Martin-Schleyer-Halle; Attendance: 8,000

==== Table ====
Pos	Team	Pld	W	D	L	GF	GA	GD	Pts
1	FC Wacker Innsbruck	3	3	0	0	11	6	+5	6
2	VfB Stuttgart	3	2	0	1	8	5	+3	4
3	Eintracht Frankfurt	3	1	0	2	11	11	0	2
4	Stuttgarter Kickers	3	0	0	3	4	12	−8	0

Source: eintracht-archiv.de
Rules for classification: 1) Points

== Squad ==
=== Squad and statistics ===
No.	Pos	Nat	Player	Total		Bundesliga		DFB-Pokal	
No.	Pos	Nat	Player	Apps	Goals	Apps	Goals	Apps	Goals
	GK	(West Germany) FRG	Hans-Jürgen Gundelach	32	0	31	0	1	0
	GK	(East Germany) GDR	Jürgen Pahl	4	0	4	0	0	0
	DF	(West Germany) FRG	Manfred Binz	2	0	2	0	0	0
	DF	(West Germany) FRG	Alexander Caspary	12	0	12	0	0	0
	DF	(West Germany) FRG	Norbert Fruck	7	0	7	0	0	0
	DF	(West Germany) FRG	Charly Körbel	34	2	33	2	1	0
	DF	(Poland) POL	Bogusław Kwiecień / Wolfgang April (Note: The player started the season under his birth name Bogusław Kwiecień with a Polish passport. During the season he received a German passport and changed his name to Wolfgang April which is a naturalised version of his Polish birth name.)	7	0	6	0	1	0
	DF	(West Germany) FRG	Ralf Sievers	34	3	33	3	1	0
	DF	(West Germany) FRG	Klaus Theiss	29	7	28	7	1	0
	DF	(West Germany) FRG	Martin Trieb	18	0	18	0	0	0
	MF	(West Germany) FRG	Thomas Berthold	26	3	25	2	1	1
	MF	(West Germany) FRG	Hans-Peter Boy	1	0	1	0	0	0
	MF	(West Germany) FRG	Alexander Conrad	8	0	8	0	0	0
	MF	(West Germany) FRG	Ralf Falkenmayer	28	2	28	2	0	0
	MF	(West Germany) FRG	Armin Kraaz	17	0	16	0	1	0
	MF	(West Germany) FRG	Andreas Möller	1	0	1	0	0	0
	MF	(West Germany) FRG	Uwe Müller	22	0	21	0	1	0
	FW	(West Germany) FRG	Uwe Bühler	16	1	15	1	1	0
	FW	(West Germany) FRG	Holger Friz	25	5	25	5	0	0
	FW	(West Germany) FRG	Dieter Kitzmann	18	3	18	3	0	0
	FW	(West Germany) FRG	Harald Krämer	24	4	23	4	1	0
	FW	(Australia) AUS	David Mitchell	3	0	3	0	0	0
	FW	(West Germany) FRG	Thomas Reubold	2	0	2	0	0	0
	FW	(West Germany) FRG	Josef Sarroca	29	4	28	4	1	0
	FW	(Sweden) SWE	Jan Svensson	31	2	30	2	1	0

=== Transfers ===
In:

No.	Pos.	Nation	Player
—	FW	FRG	Uwe Bühler (from Karlsruher SC)
—	DF	FRG	Alexander Caspary (from Eintracht Frankfurt II)
—	FW	FRG	Dieter Kitzmann (loaned from 1. FC Kaiserslautern)
—	FW	AUS	David Mitchell (from Seiko SA)
—	MF	FRG	Andreas Möller (from Eintracht Frankfurt II)
—	FW	FRG	Thomas Reubold (from Eintracht Frankfurt II)
—	FW	FRG	Josef Sarroca (from VfR Bürstadt)
—	DF	FRG	Klaus Theiss (from Karlsruher SC)

Out:

No.	Pos.	Nation	Player
—	MF	FRG	Thomas Kroth (to Hamburger SV)
—	MF	POL	Bogusław Kwiecień / Wolfgang April (to SpVgg Bayreuth)
—	MF	FRG	Jürgen Mohr (to 1. FC Saarbrücken)
—	FW	FRG	Cezary Tobollik (to Viktoria Aschaffenburg)

== Sources ==
- Matheja, Ulrich (2011). Unsere Eintracht - Eintracht Frankfurt - Die Chronik. Die Werkstatt. ISBN 978-3-89533-750-5.
