= 1986–87 Eintracht Frankfurt season =

Eintracht Frankfurt
1986–87 season
- Chairman: Klaus Gramlich
- Manager: Dietrich Weise (sacked 3 December 1986); Timo Zahnleiter (signed 4 December 1986)
- Bundesliga: 15th
- DFB-Pokal: Quarter-finals
- Top goalscorer: League: Janusz Turowski (7); All: Janusz Turowski (8)
- Highest home attendance: 58,000 11 October 1986 v Bayern Munich (league)
- Lowest home attendance: 8,000 24 April 1987 v BW 1890 Berlin and 5 June 1987 v VfB Stuttgart(league)
- Average home league attendance: 18,500

The 1986–87 Eintracht Frankfurt season was the 87th season in the club's football history. In 1986–87 the club played in the Bundesliga, the top tier of German football. It was the club's 24th season in the Bundesliga.

== Matches ==
=== Legend ===
Win Draw Loss Postponed

=== Friendlies ===
8 July 1986	Büdingen XI (West Germany)	2–7	(West Germany) Eintracht Frankfurt	West Germany
	Goal	Report	Möller; Krämer; Friz; Müller; Sievers	Attendance: 800

10 July 1986	FSV Frankfurt (West Germany)	2–2	(West Germany) Eintracht Frankfurt	West Germany
	Goal	Report	Körbel; Krämer	Attendance: 2,000

12 July 1986	FC Eintracht Poppenlauer (West Germany)	0–14	(West Germany) Eintracht Frankfurt	West Germany
16:00 CEST		Report	Mitchell 10', 71'; Jessl 16', 20', 27', 34'; Sarroca 42', 67'; Friz 55', 72', 85'; Krämer 61', 69', 88'	Attendance: 1,200; Referee: Götschel

13 July 1986	SC Marktbreit (West Germany)	2–9	(West Germany) Eintracht Frankfurt	West Germany
	Goal	Report	Krämer; Falkenmayer; Körbel; Jessl; Möller; Friz	Attendance: 2,000

16 July 1986	FSV Bad Orb (West Germany)	1–5	(West Germany) Eintracht Frankfurt	Bad Orb, West Germany
	Punzet 79'	Report	Kraus 31'; Falkenmayer 36'; Theiss 40'; Jessl 71'; Sarroca 85'	Attendance: 1,500

18 July 1986	VfL Osnabrück (West Germany)	6–2	(West Germany) Eintracht Frankfurt	West Germany
20:00 CEST	Goal	Report	Smolarek; Mitchell	Attendance: 3,500

20 July 1986	FSV Münster (West Germany)	0–13	(West Germany) Eintracht Frankfurt	Münster, West Germany
17:00 CEST		Report	Jessl 2', 50', 70'; Kraus 34', 36'; Theiss 38', 83'; Streichsbier 42' (o.g); Mitchell 49'; Möller 68'; Smolarek 78', 89'; Kitzmann 85'	Stadium: FSV-Sportplatz; Attendance: 2,000; Referee: Birlenbach

21 July 1986	TuS Ergenzingen (West Germany)	1–9	(West Germany) Eintracht Frankfurt	West Germany
	Klopp 25'	Report	Mitchell 2', 38', 80'; Möller 58', 83'; Theiss 61' (pen.); Körbel 63'; Smolarek 72', 75'	Attendance: 2,500

23 July 1986	VfR Umkirch (West Germany)	1–12	(West Germany) Eintracht Frankfurt	Umkirch, West Germany
	Herbstritt 90'	Report	Kraaz 5', 17'; Berthold 18'; Jessl 37', 65', 78'; Smolarek 61', 75', 76'; Kitzmann 63'; Binz 82'	Attendance: 1,000

25 July 1986	FC St. Gallen (Switzerland)	0–0	(West Germany) Eintracht Frankfurt
		Report		Attendance: 3,000

27 July 1986	Spvgg Freudenstadt (West Germany)	1–8	(West Germany) Eintracht Frankfurt	Freudenstadt, West Germany
	Goal	Report	Möller; Berthold; Mitchell; Smolarek; Jessl	Attendance: 1,500

29 July 1986	SV Breisach (West Germany)	1–11	(West Germany) Eintracht Frankfurt	Breisach, West Germany
	Klausmann	Report	Jessl 20'; Smolarek; Sievers 27'; Körbel; Mitchell 56', 57', 70'	Stadium: Waldstadion; Attendance: 700

1 August 1986	Gelnhausen XI (West Germany)	1–6	(West Germany) Eintracht Frankfurt	Wächtersbach, West Germany
	Krieg	Report	Berthold 38'; Smolarek 39'; Jessl; Boy 86'	Stadium: Sportanlage in der Aue; Attendance: 1,100

3 August 1986	SG Egelsbach (West Germany)	1–3	(West Germany) Eintracht Frankfurt	Egelsbach, West Germany
	Becker 50'	Report	Jessl 22'; Sievers 36'; Berthold 69'	Attendance: 1,500; Referee: Becker

5 August 1986	TSV Kirchhain (West Germany)	0–8	(West Germany) Eintracht Frankfurt	Kirchhain, West Germany
		Report	Berthold 24'; Sievers 53', 72', 89'; Mitchell 71', 79'; Möller 83', 86'	Attendance: 2,000

12 August 1986	SpVgg Eltville / Italia Wiesbaden XI (West Germany)	1–10	(West Germany) Eintracht Frankfurt	Geisenheim, West Germany
	Basile 74'	Report	Smolarek 2'; Jessl 6', 16', 56', 86'; Boy 15'; Binz 39'; Reubold 63'; Möller 85', 87'	Attendance: 1,000; Referee: Birlenbach

24 August 1986	Germania Bietigheim (West Germany)	2–4	(West Germany) Eintracht Frankfurt	West Germany
	Hauke 1'; Kloft 40'	Report	Smolarek 10'; Berthold 35'; Jessl 39'; Sarroca 74'	Attendance: 2,500

26 August 1986	Tuspo Ziegenhain (West Germany)	0–5	(West Germany) Eintracht Frankfurt	West Germany
		Report	Friz 3'; Smolarek 60', 75'; Berthold 78'; Mitchell 80'	Attendance: 1,000; Referee: Hassenpflug

9 September 1986	Eintracht Frankfurt (West Germany)	1–3	(West Germany) Germany	Frankfurt, West Germany
17:30 CEST	Jessl 67'	Report	Völler 18'; Müller 28' (o.g); Boy 64' (o.g)	Stadium: Waldstadion; Attendance: 200; Referee: Boos
Note: 35 minutes per half time. Only journalists were admitted.

16 September 1986	SKG Frankfurt (West Germany)	0–8	(West Germany) Eintracht Frankfurt	West Germany
		Report	Berthold 20'; Friz 24', 34'; Theiss 32', 85'; Körbel 53'; Krämer 75'; Hilpert 79' (o.g)	Attendance: 200; Referee: Lössl

23 September 1986	SG 01 Hoechst (West Germany)	2–4	(West Germany) Eintracht Frankfurt	Frankfurt, West Germany
	Geiger 9'; Marx 89'	Report	Müller 10'; Münn 30'; Sarroca 38', 39'	Stadium: Stadion am Stadtpark; Attendance: 800; Referee: Willbuck

30 September 1986	SG Praunheim (West Germany)	0–12	(West Germany) Eintracht Frankfurt	Frankfurt, West Germany
		Report	Sarroca; Lauf; Müller; Krämer; Binz; Friz; Stoll o.g'	Attendance: 830

7 October 1986	PSV Blau-Gelb Frankfurt / BSC 19 Frankfurt (West Germany)	0–9	(West Germany) Eintracht Frankfurt	West Germany
		Report	Friz 17'; Münn 21'; Sarroca 22', 69', 80' (pen.); Jessl 43' (pen.); Krämer 58', 59'; Pahl 73'	Attendance: 350; Referee: Wujanz

25 January 1987	FVgg Kastel 06 / Wiesbaden XI (West Germany)	0–8	(West Germany) Eintracht Frankfurt	West Germany
		Report	Kraaz 9'; Krämer 24', 41', 87'; Falkenmayer 37'; Jessl 62'; Bühler 68'; Müller 84'	Attendance: 800; Referee: Möcks

2 February 1987	FC 08 Homburg (West Germany)	1–0	(West Germany) Eintracht Frankfurt	West Germany
	Schäfer 75'	Report

7 February 1987 International tournament (semi-finals)	AS Cannes (France)	0–3	(West Germany) Eintracht Frankfurt	Cannes, France
		Report	Smolarek 52', 90'; Turowski 56'	Attendance: 400

8 February 1987 International tournament (final match)	Romania Olympic football team	1–3	(West Germany) Eintracht Frankfurt	Cannes, France
	Pană 51'	Report	Müller 25'; Turowski 47'; Smolarek 84'	Attendance: 600; Referee: Dozol

14 February 1987	Viktoria Aschaffenburg (West Germany)	2–2	(West Germany) Eintracht Frankfurt	West Germany
	Friz 15'; Knecht 53' (pen.)	Report	Binz 37'; Biernat 63'	Attendance: 2,500; Referee: Brückner

24 March 1987	Eintracht Frankfurt (West Germany)	2–0	(Sweden) IFK Norrköping	Frankfurt, West Germany
	Krämer 75'; Mitchell 80'	Report		Stadium: Riederwaldstadion; Attendance: 100; Referee: Wujanz

20 April 1987	SpVgg Ingelheim (West Germany)	0–9	(West Germany) Eintracht Frankfurt	Ingelheim, West Germany
		Report	Smolarek 5'; Krämer 15'; Turowski 54', 57', 71'; Sievers 75'; Jessl 81', 86'; Kitzmann 90'	Stadium: Stadion Blumengarten; Attendance: 873; Referee: Paulus

2 May 1987	VfR 19 Limburg (West Germany)	0–3	(West Germany) Eintracht Frankfurt	Limburg, West Germany
		Report	Möller 34'; Kitzmann 60'; Barth 67' (o.g)	Stadium: Lahnkampfbahn; Attendance: 500; Referee: Wüst

14 May 1987	Hoechst AG factory team (West Germany)	0–3	(West Germany) Eintracht Frankfurt	Hattersheim, West Germany
		Report	Krämer 3'; Neticha 68'; Conrad 75'	Stadium: Sportpark Hattersheim; Attendance: 1,200

8 June 1987	Viktoria Kelsterbach (West Germany)	1–4	(West Germany) Eintracht Frankfurt	Kelsterbach, West Germany
	Bauer 85'	Report	Smolarek 5'; Möller 48'; Krämer 75'; Falkenmayer 78'	Stadium: Sportpark Kelsterbach; Attendance: 600

=== Bundesliga ===
==== League fixtures and results ====
9 August 1986 1	Eintracht Frankfurt	5–0	Fortuna Düsseldorf	Frankfurt, West Germany
15:30 CEST	Smolarek 3', 64'; Kraus 9'; Mitchell 44'; Berthold 58'	Report		Stadium: Waldstadion; Attendance: 17,000; Referee: Wiesel

15 August 1986 2	1. FC Köln	0–0	Eintracht Frankfurt	Cologne, West Germany
20:00 CEST		Report		Stadium: Müngersdorfer Stadion; Attendance: 22,000; Referee: Mierswa

22 August 1986 3	Eintracht Frankfurt	1–0	1. FC Nürnberg	Frankfurt, West Germany
20:00 CEST	Berthold 52'	Report		Stadium: Waldstadion; Attendance: 30,000; Referee: Kruse

2 September 1986 4	Hamburger SV	2–0	Eintracht Frankfurt	Hamburg, West Germany
20:00 CEST	Gründel 33'; von Heesen 85'	Report		Stadium: Volksparkstadion; Attendance: 25,000; Referee: Assenmacher

6 September 1986 5	Eintracht Frankfurt	2–2	1. FC Kaiserslautern	Frankfurt, West Germany
15:30 CEST	Möller 44' (pen.); Jessl 67'	Report	Hartmann 14'; Wuttke 36'	Stadium: Waldstadion; Attendance: 21,000; Referee: Puchalski

13 September 1986 6	Borussia Mönchengladbach	1–1	Eintracht Frankfurt	Mönchengladbach, West Germany
15:30 CEST	Rahn 61' (pen.)	Report	Körbel 68'	Stadium: Bökelbergstadion; Attendance: 12,500; Referee: Bruch

20 September 1986 7	Eintracht Frankfurt	2–2	Werder Bremen	Frankfurt, West Germany
15:30 CEST	Schaaf 56' (o.g); Smolarek 59'	Report	Meier 35'; Möhlmann 77'	Stadium: Waldstadion; Attendance: 26,000; Referee: Matheis

27 September 1986 8	VfL Bochum	2–0	Eintracht Frankfurt	Bochum, West Germany
15:30 CEST	Kree 73'; Woelk 79'	Report		Stadium: Ruhrstadion; Attendance: 14,000; Referee: Heitmann

4 October 1986 9	Blau-Weiß 1890 Berlin	2–2	Eintracht Frankfurt	West Berlin, West Germany
15:30 CEST	Feilzer 4'; Mattern 82'	Report	Smolarek 49'; Müller 85'	Stadium: Olympiastadion; Attendance: 12,500; Referee: Broska

11 October 1986 10	Eintracht Frankfurt	0–0	Bayern Munich	Frankfurt, West Germany
15:30 CEST		Report		Stadium: Waldstadion; Attendance: 58,000; Referee: Neuner

17 October 1986 11	Bayer Leverkusen	2–0	Eintracht Frankfurt	Leverkusen, West Germany
19:30 CEST	Waas 61', 86'	Report		Stadium: Ulrich-Haberland-Stadion; Attendance: 12,000; Referee: Föckler

1 November 1986 12	Eintracht Frankfurt	2–1	SV Waldhof Mannheim	Frankfurt, West Germany
15:30 CEST	Binz 9'; Berthold 13'	Report	Dickgießer 72'	Stadium: Waldstadion; Attendance: 13,000; Referee: Pauly

8 November 1986 13	FC 08 Homburg	1–1	Eintracht Frankfurt	Homburg, West Germany
14:30 CEST	Wójcicki 50'	Report	Mitchell 65'	Stadium: Waldstadion; Attendance: 7,000; Referee: Ahlenfelder

15 November 1986 14	Eintracht Frankfurt	1–0	Bayer Uerdingen	Frankfurt, West Germany
15:30 CEST	Müller 90'	Report		Stadium: Waldstadion; Attendance: 12,500; Referee: Osmers

22 November 1986 15	VfB Stuttgart	4–1	Eintracht Frankfurt	Stuttgart, West Germany
15:30 CEST	Klinsmann 11'; Perfetto 53'; Allgöwer 69' (pen.); Pašić 88'	Report	Falkenmayer 77' (pen.)	Stadium: Neckarstadion; Attendance: 18,000; Referee: Assenmacher

29 November 1986 16	Eintracht Frankfurt	0–1	FC Schalke 04	Frankfurt, West Germany
15:30 CEST		Report	Thon 86'	Stadium: Waldstadion; Attendance: 14,000; Referee: Heitmann

5 December 1986 17	Borussia Dortmund	1–0	Eintracht Frankfurt	Dortmund, West Germany
20:00 CEST	Keser 77'	Report		Stadium: Westfalenstadion; Attendance: 30,000; Referee: Zimmermann

21 February 1987 18	Fortuna Düsseldorf	3–3	Eintracht Frankfurt	Düsseldorf, West Germany
15:30 CEST	Ravn 30'; Blättel 42'; Demandt 74'	Report	Biernat 15'; Berthold 63'; Krämer 85'	Stadium: Rheinstadion; Attendance: 7,000; Referee: Theobald

28 February 1987 19	Eintracht Frankfurt	1–2	1. FC Köln	Frankfurt, West Germany
15:30 CEST	Müller 76'	Report	Woodcock 47', 80'	Stadium: Waldstadion; Attendance: 16,000; Referee: Umbach

14 March 1987 20	1. FC Nürnberg	1–0	Eintracht Frankfurt	Nuremberg, West Germany
15:30 CEST	Reuter 66' (pen.)	Report		Stadium: Städtisches Stadion; Attendance: 33,000; Referee: Kruse

20 March 1987 21	Eintracht Frankfurt	1–3	Hamburger SV	Frankfurt, West Germany
20:00 CEST	Theiss 19'	Report	Lux 33'; Okoński 38'; Dittmer 76'	Stadium: Waldstadion; Attendance: 20,000; Referee: Broska

28 March 1987 22	1. FC Kaiserslautern	2–1	Eintracht Frankfurt	Kaiserslautern, West Germany
15:30 CEST	Roos 19'; Kohr 71' (pen.)	Report	Turowski 9'	Stadium: Fritz-Walter-Stadion; Attendance: 17,500; Referee: Krug

4 April 1987 23	Eintracht Frankfurt	4–0	Borussia Mönchengladbach	Frankfurt, West Germany
15:30 CEST	Turowski 53', 61'; Thiele 65' (o.g); Mitchell 87'	Report		Stadium: Waldstadion; Attendance: 21,000; Referee: Föckler

10 April 1987 24	Werder Bremen	4–1	Eintracht Frankfurt	Bremen, West Germany
20:00 CEST	Meier 5'; Wolter 13'; Völler 48'; Sauer 90'	Report	Turowski 21'	Stadium: Weser-Stadion; Attendance: 17,000; Referee: Pauly

15 April 1987 25	Eintracht Frankfurt	1–1	VfL Bochum	Frankfurt, West Germany
20:00 CEST	Müller 40'	Report	Lameck 90'	Stadium: Waldstadion; Attendance: 10,000; Referee: Bruch

24 April 1987 26	Eintracht Frankfurt	1–3	Blau-Weiß 1890 Berlin	Frankfurt, West Germany
20:00 CEST	Theiss 84' (pen.)	Report	Riedle 11', 35'; Mattern 90'	Stadium: Waldstadion; Attendance: 8,000; Referee: Dellwing

9 May 1987 28	Eintracht Frankfurt	1–0	Bayer Leverkusen	Frankfurt, West Germany
15:30 CEST	Falkenmayer 14'	Report	Zechel (red card) 62'	Stadium: Waldstadion; Attendance: 10,000; Referee: Mierswa

12 May 1987 27	Bayern Munich	2–1	Eintracht Frankfurt	Munich, West Germany
20:00 CEST	Nachtweih 10'; Rummenigge 51'	Report	Turowski 60'	Stadium: Olympiastadion; Attendance: 14,000; Referee: Schäfer

16 May 1987 29	SV Waldhof Mannheim	2–1	Eintracht Frankfurt	Ludwigshafen, West Germany
15:30 CEST	Gaudino 30'; Bührer 75'	Report	Müller 60'	Stadium: Südweststadion; Attendance: 8,500; Referee: Gabor

23 May 1987 30	Eintracht Frankfurt	4–0	FC 08 Homburg	Frankfurt, West Germany
15:30 CEST	Falkenmayer 6'; Sievers 14'; Turowski 73', 82'	Report		Stadium: Waldstadion; Attendance: 10,000; Referee: Kautschor

30 May 1987 31	Bayer Uerdingen	1–0	Eintracht Frankfurt	Krefeld, West Germany
15:30 CEST	Klinger 14'	Report		Stadium: Grotenburg-Stadion; Attendance: 5,000; Referee: Barnick

5 June 1987 32	Eintracht Frankfurt	3–1	VfB Stuttgart	Frankfurt, West Germany
19:30 CEST	Falkenmayer 42' (pen.); Mitchell 76', 85'	Report	Allgöwer 60'	Stadium: Waldstadion; Attendance: 8,000; Referee: Puchalski

13 June 1987 33	FC Schalke 04	3–1	Eintracht Frankfurt	Gelsenkirchen, West Germany
15:30 CEST	Dierßen 52'; Marquardt 79'; Wegmann 87'	Report	Falkenmayer 70'	Stadium: Parkstadion; Attendance: 10,000; Referee: Föckler

17 June 1987 34	Eintracht Frankfurt	0–4	Borussia Dortmund	Frankfurt, West Germany
15:30 CEST		Report	Dickel 60'; Anderbrügge 63'; Mill 77', 89'	Stadium: Waldstadion; Attendance: 20,000; Referee: Schmidhuber

==== League table ====
Pos	Team	Pld	W	D	L	GF	GA	GD	Pts	Qualification or relegation
13	Schalke 04	34	12	8	14	50	58	−8	32	
14	Waldhof Mannheim	34	10	8	16	52	71	−19	28	
15	Eintracht Frankfurt	34	8	9	17	42	53	−11	25	
16	FC 08 Homburg (O)	34	6	9	19	33	79	−46	21	Qualification to relegation play-offs
17	Fortuna Düsseldorf (R)	34	7	6	21	42	91	−49	20	Relegation to 2. Bundesliga

Source: www.dfb.de
Rules for classification: 1) points; 2) goal difference; 3) number of goals scored.
(O) Play-off winners; (R) Relegated

==== Results summary ====
Overall								Home						Away					
Pld	W	D	L	GF	GA	GD	Pts	W	D	L	GF	GA	GD	W	D	L	GF	GA	GD
34	8	9	17	42	53	−11	25	8	4	5	29	20	+9	0	5	12	13	33	−20

Source: Bundesliga

==== Results by round ====
Round	1	2	3	4	5	6	7	8	9	10	11	12	13	14	15	16	17	18	19	20	21	22	23	24	25	26	27	28	29	30	31	32	33	34
Ground	H	A	H	A	H	A	H	A	A	H	A	H	A	H	A	H	A	A	H	A	H	A	H	A	H	H	A	H	A	H	A	H	A	H
Result	W	D	W	L	D	D	D	L	D	D	L	W	D	W	L	L	L	D	L	L	L	L	W	L	D	L	L	W	L	W	L	W	L	L
Position	1	3	4	6	8	7	7	11	10	11	11	8	11	7	10	12	14	14	15	15	15	15	15	15	15	15	15	15	15	15	15	15	15	15

A = Away; H = Home; W = Win; D = Draw; L = Loss

=== DFB-Pokal ===
29 August 1986 1st Round	Eintracht Frankfurt	3–1	Eintracht Braunschweig	Frankfurt, West Germany
	Mitchell 29'; Kraus 41'; Smolarek 74'	Report	Pospich 20'	Stadium: Waldstadion; Attendance: 6,000; Referee: Weber

26 October 1986 2nd Round	Mainz 05	0–1 (a.e.t.)	Eintracht Frankfurt	Mainz, West Germany
15:00 CEST		Report	Jessl 98'	Stadium: Bruchwegstadion; Attendance: 16,000; Referee: Krug

18 November 1986 Round of 16	SG Wattenscheid 09	1–3	Eintracht Frankfurt	West Germany
	Terhaar 57'	Report	Mitchell 41'; Möller 63', 65'	Attendance: 4,000; Referee: Kautschor

7 March 1986 Quarter-finals	Stuttgarter Kickers	3–1	Eintracht Frankfurt	Stuttgart, West Germany
15:30 CEST	Jeske 61'; Hein 84'; Kurtenbach 90'	Report	Turowski 87'	Stadium: Kickers-Stadion; Attendance: 10,000; Referee: Scheuerer

=== Indoor soccer tournaments ===
==== Frankfurt Cup ====
===== Group stage =====
27 December 1986 1st Match	Eintracht Frankfurt	4–3	Dukla Prague	Frankfurt, West Germany
	Berthold 6'; Möller 15'; Krämer 18'; Binz 20'	Report	Fiala 4'; Kříž 9'; Luhový 11'	Stadium: Festhalle; Attendance: 3,500

27 December 1986 2nd Match	Eintracht Frankfurt	5–2	Hungary	Frankfurt, West Germany
	Smolarek 7', 18'; Binz 10'; Münn 13'; Möller 20'	Report	Dobány 14'; Katzenbach 16'	Stadium: Festhalle; Attendance: 3,500

27 December 1986 3rd Match	Eintracht Frankfurt	2–3	SV Waldhof Mannheim	Frankfurt, West Germany
	Smolarek 4'; Kraaz 13'	Report	Jørgensen 4'; Sebert 9'; Kohler 15'	Stadium: Festhalle; Attendance: 3,500

28 December 1986 4th Match	Eintracht Frankfurt	6–0	FC Luzern	Frankfurt, West Germany
	Möller 1'; Smolarek 4'; Binz 6', 11'; Krämer 17'; Falkenmayer 18'	Report		Stadium: Festhalle; Attendance: 6,500

28 December 1986 5th Match	Eintracht Frankfurt	3–1	Udinese Calcio	Frankfurt, West Germany
	Smolarek 8', 18'; Möller 16'	Report	Chierico 15'	Stadium: Festhalle; Attendance: 6,500

Pos	Team	Pld	W	D	L	GF	GA	GD	Pts
1	Eintracht Frankfurt	5	4	0	1	20	9	+11	8
2	Dukla Prague	5	3	1	1	11	14	−3	7
3	FC Luzern	5	1	3	1	11	11	0	5
4	SV Waldhof Mannheim	5	2	1	2	12	14	−2	5
5	Hungary	5	1	1	3	17	15	+2	3
6	Udinese Calcio	5	0	2	3	7	15	−8	2

Source: eintracht-archiv.de
Rules for classification: 1) Points

===== Play-offs =====
28 December 1986 Semi-final	Eintracht Frankfurt	2–0	Dukla Prague	Frankfurt, West Germany
	Falkenmayer 18'; Binz 20'	Report		Stadium: Festhalle; Attendance: 6,500

28 December 1986 Final	Eintracht Frankfurt	6–2	SV Waldhof Mannheim	Frankfurt, West Germany
	Möller 2'; Binz 5', 9', 10'; Krämer 7'; Smolarek 20'	Report	Walter 16'; Bührer 18'	Stadium: Festhalle; Attendance: 6,500

==== Stuttgart Cup ====
===== Group stage =====
9 January 1987 1st Match	1. FC Kaiserslautern	5–3	Eintracht Frankfurt	Stuttgart, West Germany
	Wuttke; Allievi	Report	Smolarek	Stadium: Hanns-Martin-Schleyer-Halle; Attendance: 8,000

9 January 1987 2nd Match	Eintracht Frankfurt	6–4	Galatasaray	Stuttgart, West Germany
	Smolarek; Möller; Neticha	Report	Goal	Stadium: Hanns-Martin-Schleyer-Halle; Attendance: 8,000

10 January 1987 3rd Match	VfB Stuttgart	1–3	Eintracht Frankfurt	Stuttgart, West Germany
	Buchwald	Report	Möller; Binz; Smolarek	Stadium: Hanns-Martin-Schleyer-Halle; Attendance: 8,000

Pos	Team	Pld	W	D	L	GF	GA	GD	Pts
1	1. FC Kaiserslautern	3	2	1	0	11	7	+4	5
2	Eintracht Frankfurt	3	2	0	1	12	10	+2	4
3	VfB Stuttgart	3	1	1	1	5	6	−1	3
4	Galatasaray	3	0	0	3	7	12	−5	0

Source: eintracht-archiv.de
Rules for classification: 1) Points

===== Play-offs =====
10 January 1987 Semi-final	Eintracht Frankfurt	2–3	AFC Ajax	Stuttgart, West Germany
	Möller; Binz	Report	Wouters	Stadium: Hanns-Martin-Schleyer-Halle; Attendance: 8,000

10 January 1987 Third place play-off	1. FC Nürnberg	6–1	Eintracht Frankfurt	Stuttgart, West Germany
	Goal	Report	Goal	Stadium: Hanns-Martin-Schleyer-Halle; Attendance: 8,000

==== Strasbourg Cup ====
===== Group stage =====
23 January 1987 1st Match	AS Nancy	2–3	Eintracht Frankfurt	Strasbourg, France
	Goal	Report	Smolarek 5'; Münn 8'; Krämer 9'	Stadium: Hall Rhénus; Attendance: 500

23 January 1987 2nd Match	RC Strasbourg	1–5	Eintracht Frankfurt	Strasbourg, France
	Goal	Report	Smolarek 4', 10', 20'; Berthold 14'; Krämer 15'	Stadium: Hall Rhénus; Attendance: 500

Pos	Team	Pld	W	D	L	GF	GA	GD	Pts
1	Eintracht Frankfurt	2	2	0	0	8	3	+5	4
2	RC Strasbourg	2	1	0	1	4	6	−2	2
3	AS Nancy	2	0	0	2	3	6	−3	0

Source: eintracht-archiv.de
Rules for classification: 1) Points

===== Final round =====
24 January 1987 Final round, 1st match	AJ Auxerre	2–5	Eintracht Frankfurt	Strasbourg, France
	Goal	Report	Körbel 6', 7'; Berthold 12'; Smolarek 17'; Müller 19'	Stadium: Hall Rhénus; Attendance: 800

24 January 1987 Final round, 2nd match	Offenburger FV	2–4	Eintracht Frankfurt	Strasbourg, France
	Goal	Report	Smolarek 5', 14'; Krämer 9', 19'	Stadium: Hall Rhénus; Attendance: 800

Pos	Team	Pld	W	D	L	GF	GA	GD	Pts
1	Eintracht Frankfurt	2	2	0	0	9	4	+5	4
2	Offenburger FV	2	1	0	1	9	8	+1	2
3	AJ Auxerre	2	0	0	2	6	12	−6	0

Source: eintracht-archiv.de
Rules for classification: 1) Points

== Squad ==
=== Squad and statistics ===
No.	Pos	Nat	Player	Total		Bundesliga		DFB-Pokal	
No.	Pos	Nat	Player	Apps	Goals	Apps	Goals	Apps	Goals
	GK	(West Germany) FRG	Hans-Jürgen Gundelach	35	0	31	0	4	0
	GK	(East Germany) GDR	Jürgen Pahl	3	0	3	0	0	0
	DF	(West Germany) FRG	Thomas Berthold	25	4	21	4	4	0
	DF	(West Germany) FRG	Manfred Binz	36	1	32	1	4	0
	DF	(West Germany) FRG	Charly Körbel	37	1	33	1	4	0
	DF	(West Germany) FRG	Volker Münn	23	0	21	0	2	0
	DF	(West Germany) FRG	Ralf Sievers	32	1	28	1	4	0
	DF	(West Germany) FRG	Klaus Theiss	15	2	14	2	1	0
	MF	(Poland) POL	Jarosław Biernat	9	1	9	1	0	0
	MF	(West Germany) FRG	Alexander Conrad	4	0	4	0	0	0
	MF	(West Germany) FRG	Ralf Falkenmayer	24	5	22	5	2	0
	MF	(West Germany) FRG	Armin Kraaz	32	0	29	0	3	0
	MF	(West Germany) FRG	Wolfgang Kraus	17	2	15	1	2	1
	MF	(West Germany) FRG	Andreas Möller	25	3	22	1	3	2
	MF	(West Germany) FRG	Uwe Müller	28	5	26	5	2	0
	MF	(West Germany) FRG	Frank Würzburger	1	0	1	0	0	0
	FW	(West Germany) FRG	Holger Friz	7	0	5	0	2	0
	FW	(West Germany) FRG	Reinhold Jessl	5	2	4	1	1	1
	FW	(West Germany) FRG	Dieter Kitzmann	10	0	9	0	1	0
	FW	(West Germany) FRG	Harald Krämer	17	1	15	1	2	0
	FW	(Australia) AUS	David Mitchell	34	7	32	5	2	2
	FW	(West Germany) FRG	Josef Sarroca	7	0	5	0	2	0
	FW	(Poland) POL	Włodzimierz Smolarek	33	5	30	4	3	1
	FW	(Poland) POL	Janusz Turowski	18	8	17	7	1	1

=== Transfers ===
In:

No.	Pos.	Nation	Player
—	MF	POL	Jarosław Biernat (from Legia Warsaw (suspended due to a FIFA ban until the end of 1986))
—	FW	FRG	Reinhold Jessl (from FSV Bad Orb)
—	MF	FRG	Wolfgang Kraus (from FC Zürich)
—	DF	FRG	Volker Münn (from Hessen Kassel)
—	FW	POL	Włodzimierz Smolarek (from Widzew Łódź)
—	FW	POL	Janusz Turowski (from Pogoń Szczecin (suspended due to a FIFA ban until the end of 1986))
—	MF	FRG	Frank Würzburger (from Eintracht Frankfurt academy)

Out:

No.	Pos.	Nation	Player
—	DF	FRG	Alexander Caspary (to Rot-Weiss Frankfurt)
—	FW	FRG	Holger Friz (loaned to Viktoria Aschaffenburg)
—	FW	FRG	Josef Sarroca (loaned to Viktoria Aschaffenburg)
—	DF	FRG	Norbert Fruck (to SG Wattenscheid 09)
—	FW	FRG	Thomas Reubold (to Eintracht Frankfurt II)
—	FW	SWE	Jan Svensson (to IFK Norrköping)
—	DW	FRG	Martin Trieb (to SV Waldhof Mannheim)

== Sources ==
- Matheja, Ulrich (2011). Unsere Eintracht - Eintracht Frankfurt - Die Chronik. Die Werkstatt. ISBN 978-3-89533-750-5.
