= 1983–84 Eintracht Frankfurt season =

Eintracht Frankfurt
1983–84 season
- Chairman: Klaus Gramlich
- Manager: Branko Zebec (sacked 17 October 1983); Klaus Mank and Jürgen Grabowski (caretaker from 17 October until 30 October 1983); Dietrich Weise (signed 30 October 1983)
- Bundesliga: 16th
- DFB-Pokal: First round
- Top goalscorer: League: Ralf Falkenmayer; Jan Svensson (8); All: Jan Svensson (10)
- Highest home attendance: 55,000 5 November 1983 v Bayern Munich (league)
- Lowest home attendance: 12,000 3 September 1983 v Fortuna Düsseldorf (league)
- Average home league attendance: 22,809

The 1983–84 Eintracht Frankfurt season was the 84th season in the club's football history. In 1983–84 the club played in the Bundesliga, the top tier of German football. It was the club's 21st season in the Bundesliga.

== Matches ==
=== Legend ===
Win Draw Loss Postponed

=== Friendlies ===
6 July 1983	SG 01 Hoechst (West Germany)	0–6	(West Germany) Eintracht Frankfurt	Frankfurt West Germany
18:30 CEST		Report	Mattern 24', 84'; Sziedat 43'; Trieb 53'; Berthold 74'; Falkenmayer 82'	Stadium: Stadion am Stadtpark; Attendance: 2,800

8 July 1983	Friedrichsdorf XI (West Germany)	0–13	(West Germany) Eintracht Frankfurt	Friedrichsdorf, West Germany
		Report	Mohr 5'; Trieb 15'; Körbel 20'; Müller 32', 57', 67', 89'; Falkenmayer 36', 77', 80'; Berthold 50', 70'; Borchers 54'	Attendance: 2,500; Referee: Kantor

12 July 1983	TSV Wiggensbach (West Germany)	0–8	(West Germany) Eintracht Frankfurt	West Germany
		Report	Mohr 11', 83' (pen.); Müller 22'; Falkenmayer 33'; Körbel 55' (o.g.); Eymold 72'; Trieb 76'; Kroth 90'

15 July 1983	Schwaben Augsburg (West Germany)	1–2	(West Germany) Eintracht Frankfurt	Augsburg, West Germany
	Gelb 79'	Report	Mohr 7'; Berthold 72'	Stadium: Rosenaustadion; Attendance: 900; Referee: Sievers

17 July 1983	TSG Bad Wurzach (West Germany)	0–9	(West Germany) Eintracht Frankfurt	West Germany
		Report	Sziedat 16'; Falkenmayer 24'; Berthold 41'; Müller 53'; Svensson 55', 86'; Kroth 62'; Fruck 81'; Mohr 90'	Attendance: 1,000

19 July 1983	SVO Germaringen (West Germany)	0–4	(West Germany) Eintracht Frankfurt	West Germany
		Report	Reger 30' (o.g.); Berthold 55'; Svensson 65', 73'	Attendance: 1,500

24 July 1983	Viktoria Sindlingen (West Germany)	0–5	(West Germany) Eintracht Frankfurt	West Germany
		Report	Körbel 30'; Müller 32', 52', 54'; Berthold 85'	Attendance: 3,000; Referee: Schmitt

29 July 1983	Rhön XI (West Germany)	1–11	(West Germany) Eintracht Frankfurt	Bad Brückenau, West Germany
	Pahl 5' (o.g.)	Report	Sziedat; Körbel 9', 85' (pen.); Mohr 13'; Svensson 20'; Trieb 28', 41'; Berthold 29'; Fruck 61', 64'; Müller 89'	Attendance: 2,000; Referee: Schell

31 July 1983	Mainz 05 (West Germany)	2–3	(West Germany) Eintracht Frankfurt	Mainz, West Germany
	Scherhag 36'; Bopp 72'	Report	Berthold 11', 53'; Eymold 28'	Attendance: 1,520; Referee: Heiliger

2 August 1983	Eintracht Frankfurt (West Germany)	2–3	(Greece) Olympiacos	Frankfurt, West Germany
19:15 CEST	Svensson 11'; Borchers 85'	Report	Kousoulakis 27'; Albertsen 59'; Kokolakis 83'	Stadium: Stadion am Bornheimer Hang; Attendance: 4,000; Referee: Schäfer

4 August 1983 Coppa Zanussi Semi-Final	Eintracht Frankfurt (West Germany)	1–2	(Brazil) Vasco da Gama	Lignano Sabbiadoro, Italy
	Mohr 23'	Report	Celso Gavião 19' (pen.); Ernani 41'	Attendance: 3,000; Referee: Luigi Agnolin

7 August 1983 Coppa Zanussi third place playoff	Real Madrid (Spain)	1–2	(West Germany) Eintracht Frankfurt	Udine, Italy
	San José 83'	Report	Svensson 22'; Körbel 47'	Attendance: 30,000; Referee: Magni

15 August 1983	Hochtaunus / Weilmünster XI (West Germany)	3–11	(West Germany) Eintracht Frankfurt	Grävenwiesbach, West Germany
	Warz; Klotz; Haub	Report	Borchers; Körbel; Trieb; Schreml; Sievers; Fruck; Eymold	Attendance: 2,500

21 September 1983	IFK Norrköping (Sweden)	2–1	(West Germany) Eintracht Frankfurt	Norrköping, Sweden
	Hellström 28'; Lind 33'	Report	Fruck 43'	Attendance: 3,500

8 October 1983	SV Darmstadt 98 (West Germany)	0–1	(West Germany) Eintracht Frankfurt	Rüsselsheim, West Germany
		Report	Svensson 22'	Stadium: Stadion am Sommerdamm; Attendance: 1,150; Referee: Birlenbach

15 November 1983	KSV Klein-Karben (West Germany)	1–4	(West Germany) Eintracht Frankfurt	West Germany
19:00 CEST	Schuhmacher	Report	Trieb; Krämer; Müller; Friz	Attendance: 500

18 November 1983	Hannover 96 (West Germany)	1–1	(West Germany) Eintracht Frankfurt	Hanover, West Germany
	Pieta 33'	Report	Eymold 80'	Stadium: Niedersachsenstadion; Attendance: 400; Referee: Ren

29 November 1983	1. FC Oberursel (West Germany)	0–5	(West Germany) Eintracht Frankfurt	Oberursel, West Germany
		Report	Krämer 24'; Friz 66'; Sievers 67'; Fruck 68'; Trieb 72'	Attendance: 300

7 January 1984	Tennis Borussia Berlin (West Germany)	1–2	(West Germany) Eintracht Frankfurt	Berlin, West Germany
	Schilling 31'	Report	Svensson 20'; Kroth 41'	Attendance: 192; Referee: Peter Gabor

8 January 1984	NSC Marathon 02 (West Germany)	1–11	(West Germany) Eintracht Frankfurt	Berlin, West Germany
	Klein 90'	Report	Borchers 20'; Falkenmayer 23'; Sievers 29', 67'; Kroth 35', 41', 73', 78'; Müller 71', 90'; Trieb 75'	Attendance: 400

13 January 1984	TV Oeffingen (West Germany)	2–5	(West Germany) Eintracht Frankfurt	Fellbach, West Germany
	Meilke 87'; Lober 88'	Report	Tobollik 30', 43'; Müller 31', 55'; Falkenmayer 77'	Attendance: 1,000; Referee: Walz

15 January 1984	Stuttgarter Kickers (West Germany)	2–5	(West Germany) Eintracht Frankfurt	Stuttgart, West Germany
	Klinsmann 54'; Merkle 68'	Report	Borchers 15'; Müller 30', 32'; Tobollik 35'; Sievers 55'	Stadium: Kickers-Stadion; Attendance: 600; Referee: Eugen Striegel

17 January 1984	TSV Deizisau / SF Dettingen (West Germany)	2–9	(West Germany) Eintracht Frankfurt	Deizisau, West Germany
	Fischer 86'; Keppler 89'	Report	Körbel 13' (pen.); Falkenmayer 30', 57'; Tobollik 48', 69'; Kroth 64'; Svensson 68'; Trieb 77'; Schreml 83'	Attendance: 1,200

18 February 1984	1. FC Langendiebach (West Germany)	1–8	(West Germany) Eintracht Frankfurt	Erlensee, West Germany
	Leitsch 23'	Report	Körbel 7' (pen.); Kroth 12'; Tobollik 17'; Mattern 37'; Trieb 69'; Falkenmayer 82'; Fruck 84'; Müller 89'	Attendance: 700; Referee: Poth

3 March 1984	VfR Achern (West Germany)	1–5	(West Germany) Eintracht Frankfurt	Achern, West Germany
	Funk 20'	Report	Körbel 29' (pen.); Svensson 34', 66'; Tobollik 40'; Kraaz 86'	Attendance: 400; Referee: Dehmelt

13 March 1984	TuS Diez (West Germany)	1–14	(West Germany) Eintracht Frankfurt	Diez, West Germany
	Weigand 79'	Report	Borchers 11', 25', 61' (pen.); Kroth 13' 65'; Falkenmayer 30'; Mattern 35', 76'; Svensson 45'; Tobollik 55'; Schreml 80'; Kraaz 84'	Attendance: 2,500; Referee: Günter Linn

20 March 1984	TSV Eschollbrücken (West Germany)	1–20	(West Germany) Eintracht Frankfurt	Pfungstadt, West Germany
	Goal	Report	Mattern; Krämer; Müller; Sievers; Wöber; Klepper; Friz; Eymold; Jüriens	Attendance: 500; Referee: Rainer Jupe

27 March 1984	FV 06 Sprendlingen (West Germany)	1–2	(West Germany) Eintracht Frankfurt	West Germany
	Schwarz 85'	Report	Schreml 60'; Friz 78'	Attendance: 1,000

10 April 1984	SG Bad Soden (West Germany)	3–6	(West Germany) Eintracht Frankfurt	West Germany
18:15 CEST	Müller 28', 75'; Schröder 54'	Report	Eymold 1'; Mohr 31'; Mattern 62'; Friz 77'; Krämer 80', 89'	Attendance: 1,200

17 April 1984	SG Ober-Erlenbach (West Germany)	0–4	(West Germany) Eintracht Frankfurt	Bad Homburg, West Germany
18:30 CEST		Report	Schreml 39'; Mattern 47'; Eymold 75' (pen.); Tobollik 87'	Attendance: 600; Referee: Kantor

24 April 1984	SV 07 Raunheim (West Germany)	3–3	(West Germany) Eintracht Frankfurt	West Germany
18:30 CEST	Breul 33'; Schrode 58', 74'	Report	Tobollik 15', 48'; Mohr 78'	Attendance: 250; Referee: Müller

8 May 1984	Langen XI (West Germany)	2–9	(West Germany) Eintracht Frankfurt	Langen, West Germany
	Jakel 19'; Fink 49'	Report	Kroth 10'; Müller 17', 43'; Mohr 26'; Svensson 44'; Tobollik 58'; Krämer 76'; Eymold 78'; Schreml 88'	Stadium: Waldstadion; Attendance: 1,600; Referee: Blücher

8 June 1984	SpVgg 1910 Langenselbold (West Germany)	2–12	(West Germany) Eintracht Frankfurt	Langenselbold, West Germany
18:30 CEST	Achim Schmidt 7'; Kempski 81'	Report	Kahlhofen 9', 41'; Mattern 16', 17', 28', 46', 89'; Krämer 52'; Müller 64', 78', 90'; Schreml 74' (pen.)	Stadium: Sportanlage am Brühl; Attendance: 1,300

=== Bundesliga ===
==== League fixtures and results ====
12 August 1983 1	Eintracht Frankfurt	2–2	Borussia Dortmund	Frankfurt, West Germany
15:30 CEST	Svensson 40'; Mohr 63'	Report	Reich 49', 66'	Stadium: Waldstadion; Attendance: 25,000; Referee: Dieter Niebergall

19 August 1983 2	Bayer Uerdingen	5–2	Eintracht Frankfurt	Krefeld, West Germany
20:00 CEST	F Funkel 17', 87'; Herget 24'; Loontiens 57'; Puszamszies 88'	Report	Fruck 27'; Berthold 51'	Stadium: Grotenburg-Stadion; Attendance: 20,000; Referee: Hans-Joachim Osmers

24 August 1983 3	Eintracht Frankfurt	2–2	Bayer Leverkusen	Frankfurt, West Germany
20:00 CEST	Sziedat 39'; Körbel 85'	Report	Cha 74'; Waas 76'	Stadium: Waldstadion; Attendance: 15,000; Referee: Heinz Werner

31 August 1983 4	Arminia Bielefeld	2–1	Eintracht Frankfurt	Bielefeld, West Germany
19:30 CEST	Westerwinter 5' (red card) 87'; Pagelsdorf 15' (pen.)	Report	Borchers 48'	Stadium: Stadion Alm; Attendance: 12,000; Referee: Jakob Wippker

3 September 1983 5	Eintracht Frankfurt	3–0	Fortuna Düsseldorf	Frankfurt, West Germany
15:30 CEST	Körbel 6' (pen.); Svensson 68', 90'	Report		Stadium: Waldstadion; Attendance: 12,000; Referee: Wolf Umbach

10 September 1983 6	Kickers Offenbach	2–1	Eintracht Frankfurt	Offenbach, West Germany
15:30 CEST	Bein 27' (pen.); Kutzop 89'	Report	Sievers 88'; Sziedat (red card) 71'	Stadium: Stadion am Bieberer Berg; Attendance: 27,000; Referee: Josef Hontheim

17 September 1983 7	Eintracht Frankfurt	0–0	Werder Bremen	Frankfurt, West Germany
15:30 CEST		Report		Stadium: Waldstadion; Attendance: 19,000; Referee: Günter Risse

24 September 1983 8	Eintracht Braunschweig	4–3	Eintracht Frankfurt	Braunschweig, West Germany
15:30 CEST	Lux 35'; Keute 45'; Studzizba 52'; Kraaz 67' (o.g.)	Report	Falkenmayer 28'; Schreml 40'; Kroth 65'	Stadium: Städtisches Stadion an der Hamburger Straße; Attendance: 12,000; Referee: Wolf-Dieter Ahlenfelder

1 October 1983 9	Eintracht Frankfurt	1–3	SV Waldhof Mannheim	Frankfurt, West Germany
15:30 CEST	Körbel 82' (pen.)	Report	Schön 55'; Makan 70'; Böhni 89'	Stadium: Waldstadion; Attendance: 19,000; Referee: Adolf Ermer

15 October 1983 10	VfL Bochum	4–1	Eintracht Frankfurt	Bochum, West Germany
15:30 CEST	Oswald 8'; Woelk 47'; Kuntz 50', 68'	Report	Kroth 56'	Stadium: Ruhrstadion; Attendance: 15,000; Referee: Udo Horeis

22 October 1983 11	Eintracht Frankfurt	1–1	Borussia Mönchengladbach	Frankfurt, West Germany
15:30 CEST	Kroth 18'	Report	Rahn 54'	Stadium: Waldstadion; Attendance: 23,000; Referee: Friedrich Retzmann

29 October 1983 12	1. FC Köln	7–0	Eintracht Frankfurt	Cologne, West Germany
15:30 CEST	Haas 29', 39'; Fischer 32'; Allofs 49'; Hartmann 72'; Steiner 85'; Mennie 89'	Report		Stadium: Müngersdorfer Stadion; Attendance: 11,000; Referee: Wolf-Günter Wiesel

5 November 1983 13	Eintracht Frankfurt	0–0	Bayern Munich	Frankfurt, West Germany
15:30 CEST		Report		Stadium: Waldstadion; Attendance: 55,000; Referee: Manfred Uhlig

12 November 1983 14	1. FC Nürnberg	0–0	Eintracht Frankfurt	Nuremberg, West Germany
15:30 CEST		Report		Stadium: Städtisches Stadion; Attendance: 14,000; Referee: Hans Wahmann

26 November 1983 15	Eintracht Frankfurt	1–3	VfB Stuttgart	Frankfurt, West Germany
15:30 CEST	Svensson 12'	Report	Allgöwer 16'; Sigurvinsson 54'; Reichert 70'	Stadium: Waldstadion; Attendance: 20,000; Referee: Aron Schmidhuber

3 December 1983 16	Eintracht Frankfurt	0–0	Hamburger SV	Frankfurt, West Germany
15:30 CEST		Report		Stadium: Waldstadion; Attendance: 28,000; Referee: Wolf-Dieter Ahlenfelder

10 December 1983 17	1. FC Kaiserslautern	1–0	Eintracht Frankfurt	Kaiserslautern, West Germany
15:30 CEST	Hübner 34'	Report	Fruck (red card) 80'	Stadium: Betzenbergstadion; Attendance: 17,000; Referee: Hans-Heinrich Barnick

21 January 1984 18	Borussia Dortmund	2–0	Eintracht Frankfurt	Dortmund, West Germany
15:30 CEST	Răducanu 60'; Wegmann 80'	Report		Stadium: Westfalenstadion; Attendance: 17,000; Referee: Werner Föckler

28 January 1984 19	Eintracht Frankfurt	2–2	Bayer Uerdingen	Frankfurt, West Germany
15:30 CEST	Falkenmayer 25'; Svensson 44'	Report	Herget 70'; F Funkel 90'	Stadium: Waldstadion; Attendance: 13,750; Referee: Volker Huster

4 February 1984 20	Bayer Leverkusen	2–2	Eintracht Frankfurt	Leverkusen, West Germany
15:30 CEST	Waas 7', 32'	Report	Svensson 57'; Müller 90'	Stadium: Ulrich-Haberland-Stadion; Attendance: 8,000; Referee: Gerhard Theobald

11 February 1984 21	Eintracht Frankfurt	1–1	Arminia Bielefeld	Frankfurt, West Germany
15:30 CEST	Grillemeier 25'	Report	Kroth 80'	Stadium: Waldstadion; Attendance: 15,000; Referee: Peter Gabor

25 February 1984 23	Eintracht Frankfurt	3–0	Kickers Offenbach	Frankfurt, West Germany
15:30 CEST	Kutzop 45' (o.g.); Sziedat (red card) 70'; Svensson 75'; Mattern 85'	Report		Stadium: Waldstadion; Attendance: 35,000; Referee: Dieter Pauly

9 March 1984 24	Werder Bremen	2–3	Eintracht Frankfurt	Bremen, West Germany
20:00 CEST	Reinders 34' (pen.), 63'	Report	Falkenmayer 19', 79'; Tobollik 25'	Stadium: Weserstadion; Attendance: 16,200; Referee: Wolf-Rüdiger Umbach

17 March 1984 25	Eintracht Frankfurt	1–2	Eintracht Braunschweig	Frankfurt, West Germany
15:30 CEST	Trieb 58'	Report	Lux 26'; Hollmann 67'	Stadium: Waldstadion; Attendance: 19,000; Referee: Walter Eschweiler

24 March 1984 26	SV Waldhof Mannheim	1–1	Eintracht Frankfurt	Ludwigshafen, West Germany
15:30 CEST	Olaidotter 59'; Schlindwein (red card) 74'	Report	Falkenmayer 73'	Stadium: Südweststadion; Attendance: 25,000; Referee: Hans-Peter Dellwing

31 March 1984 27	Eintracht Frankfurt	1–0	VfL Bochum	Frankfurt, West Germany
15:30 CEST	Falkenmayer 81'	Report		Stadium: Waldstadion; Attendance: 16,500; Referee: Karl-Heinz Tritschler

7 April 1984 28	Borussia Mönchengladbach	1–1	Eintracht Frankfurt	Mönchengladbach, West Germany
15:30 CEST	Lienen 90'	Report	Müller 80'	Stadium: Bökelbergstadion; Attendance: 17,640; Referee: Heinz Werner

14 April 1984 29	Eintracht Frankfurt	0–2	1. FC Köln	Frankfurt, West Germany
15:30 CEST		Report	K Allofs 84', 89'	Stadium: Waldstadion; Attendance: 31,000; Referee: Hans-Joachim Osmers

21 April 1984 22	Fortuna Düsseldorf	4–2	Eintracht Frankfurt	Düsseldorf, West Germany
15:30 CEST	Thiele 7', 75'; Bommer 25', 82'	Report	Müller 49'; Eðvaldsson 69' (o.g.)	Stadium: Rheinstadion; Attendance: 10,000; Referee: Wilfried Heitmann

28 April 1984 30	Bayern Munich	3–0	Eintracht Frankfurt	Munich, West Germany
15:30 CEST	Rummenigge 12', 40'; Mathy 51'	Report		Stadium: Olympiastadion; Attendance: 20,000; Referee: Peter Corell

5 May 1984 31	Eintracht Frankfurt	3–1	1. FC Nürnberg	Frankfurt, West Germany
15:30 CEST	Körbel 5', 81'; Berthold 90'	Report	R Abramczik 69'	Stadium: Waldstadion; Attendance: 16,500; Referee: Karl-Josef Assenmacher

12 May 1984 32	VfB Stuttgart	2–2	Eintracht Frankfurt	Stuttgart, West Germany
15:30 CEST	Reichert 8'; Allgöwer 22'	Report	Berthold 85'; Müller 90'	Stadium: Neckarstadion; Attendance: 36,000; Referee: Manfred Neuner

19 May 1984 33	Hamburger SV	0–2	Eintracht Frankfurt	Hamburg, West Germany
15:30 CEST		Report	Falkenmayer 9', 90' (pen.)	Stadium: Volksparkstadion; Attendance: 38,000; Referee: Jakob Wippker

26 May 1984 34	Eintracht Frankfurt	3–0	1. FC Kaiserslautern	Frankfurt, West Germany
15:30 CEST	Tobollik 47', 52'; Svensson 82'	Report		Stadium: Waldstadion; Attendance: 25,000; Referee: Rüdiger Wuttke

==== Relegation play-offs ====
1 June 1984 First leg	MSV Duisburg	0–5	Eintracht Frankfurt	Duisburg, West Germany
		Report	Svensson 23'; Müller 53'; Falkenmayer 68'; Tobollik 78'; Krämer 80'	Stadium: Wedaustadion; Attendance: 29,000; Referee: Wilfried Heitmann

17 June 1989 Second leg	Eintracht Frankfurt	1–1	MSV Duisburg	Frankfurt, West Germany
20:00 CEST	Müller 83'	Report	Schlipper 80'	Stadium: Waldstadion; Attendance: 42,000; Referee: Hans-Peter Dellwing

==== League table ====
Pos	Team	Pld	W	D	L	GF	GA	GD	Pts	Qualification or relegation
14	Fortuna Düsseldorf	34	11	7	16	63	75	−12	29	
15	VfL Bochum	34	10	8	16	58	70	−12	28	
16	Eintracht Frankfurt (O)	34	7	13	14	45	61	−16	27	Qualification to relegation play-offs
17	Kickers Offenbach (R)	34	7	5	22	48	106	−58	19	Relegation to 2. Bundesliga
18	1. FC Nürnberg (R)	34	6	2	26	38	85	−47	14	Relegation to 2. Bundesliga

Source: www.dfb.de
Rules for classification: 1) points; 2) goal difference; 3) number of goals scored.
(O) Play-off winners; (R) Relegated

==== Results summary ====
Source: Bundesliga

==== Results by round ====
Round	1	2	3	4	5	6	7	8	9	10	11	12	13	14	15	16	17	18	19	20	21	22	23	24	25	26	27	28	29	30	31	32	33	34
Ground	H	A	H	A	H	A	H	A	H	A	H	A	H	A	H	H	A	A	H	A	H	A	H	A	H	A	H	A	H	A	H	A	A	H
Result	D	L	D	L	W	L	D	L	L	L	D	L	D	D	L	D	L	L	D	D	D	L	W	W	L	D	W	D	L	L	L	D	W	W
Position	9	16	15	16	12	14	14	18	18	18	18	18	18	18	18	18	17	18	17	17	17	16	16	16	16	16	16	16	16	16	16	16	16	16

A = Away; H = Home; W = Win; D = Draw; L = Loss

=== DFB-Pokal ===
28 August 1983 First round	Göttingen 05	4–2	Eintracht Frankfurt	Göttingen, West Germany
15:00 CEST	Weir 7', 18'; Krech 16', 90'	Report	Trieb 19'; Svensson 67'	Stadium: Jahnstadion; Attendance: 8,000; Referee: Rainer Waltert

=== Indoor soccer tournaments ===
==== Frankfurt ====
26-28 December 1983 1st Match	Eintracht Frankfurt (West Germany)	5–1	(Switzerland) BSC Young Boys	Frankfurt, West Germany
	Borchers 4'; Trieb 5'; Müller 16', 17'; Kahlhofen 19'	Report	Mezger 18'	Stadium: Festhalle; Attendance: 14,000

26-28 December 1983 2nd Match	Eintracht Frankfurt (West Germany)	2–0	(West Germany) Amateurs XI	Frankfurt, West Germany
	Müller 9'; Trieb 20'	Report		Stadium: Festhalle; Attendance: 14,000

26-28 December 1983 3rd Match	Eintracht Frankfurt (West Germany)	1–3	(West Germany) Kickers Offenbach	Frankfurt, West Germany
	Müller	Report	Michelberger; Bein; Kutzop	Stadium: Festhalle; Attendance: 14,000

===== Group Stage Table =====
Pos	Team	Pld	W	D	L	GF	GA	GD	Pts
1	Kickers Offenbach	3	2	0	1	12	6	+6	4
2	Eintracht Frankfurt	3	2	0	1	8	4	+4	4
3	Amateurs XI	3	1	0	2	6	10	−4	2
4	BSC Young Boys	3	1	0	2	7	13	−6	2

Source: eintracht-archiv.de
Rules for classification: 1) Points

26-28 December 1983 Final Round 1st Match	Eintracht Frankfurt (West Germany)	1–1	(West Germany) 1. FC Kaiserslautern	Frankfurt, West Germany
	Borchers	Report	Loechelt	Stadium: Festhalle; Attendance: 14,000

26-28 December 1983 Final Round 2nd Match	Eintracht Frankfurt (West Germany)	0–0	KOR Daewoo Royals	Frankfurt, West Germany
		Report		Stadium: Festhalle; Attendance: 14,000

26-28 December 1983 Final Round 3rd Match	Eintracht Frankfurt (West Germany)	5–1	(West Germany) Kickers Offenbach	Frankfurt, West Germany
	Berthold; Mattern; Kraaz; Borchers	Report	Sandner	Stadium: Festhalle; Attendance: 14,000

===== Final Stage Table =====
Pos	Team	Pld	W	D	L	GF	GA	GD	Pts
1	1. FC Kaiserslautern	3	2	1	0	6	2	+4	5
2	Eintracht Frankfurt	3	1	2	0	6	2	+4	4
3	Daewoo Royals	3	0	2	1	1	3	−2	2
4	Kickers Offenbach	3	0	1	2	3	9	−6	1

Rules for classification: 1) Points

==== Bremen ====
29-30 December 1983 1st Match	Werder Bremen (West Germany)	4–4	(West Germany) Eintracht Frankfurt	Bremen, West Germany
	Völler; Sidka; Meier	Report	Trieb; Müller; Sievers; Borchers	Stadium: Stadthalle Bremen; Attendance: 12,000

29-30 December 1983 2nd Match	FC Schalke 04 (West Germany)	5–2	(West Germany) Eintracht Frankfurt	Bremen, West Germany
	Dierßen; Abel; V Abramczik	Report	Mattern; Trieb	Stadium: Stadthalle Bremen; Attendance: 12,000

===== Group Stage Table =====
Pos	Team	Pld	W	D	L	GF	GA	GD	Pts
1	Werder Bremen	2	1	1	0	9	8	+1	3
2	FC Schalke 04	2	1	0	1	9	7	+2	2
3	Eintracht Frankfurt	2	0	1	1	6	9	−3	1

Source: eintracht-archiv.de
Rules for classification: 1) Points

==== Berlin ====
4 January 1984 1st Match	Eintracht Frankfurt (West Germany)	0–1	(Hungary) Újpest Dózsa	Berlin, West Germany
		Report	Törőcsik	Stadium: Deutschlandhalle; Attendance: 7,000

4 January 1984 2nd Match	SC Charlottenburg (West Germany)	1–1	(West Germany) Eintracht Frankfurt	Berlin, West Germany
	Gaedke 2'	Report	Trieb 4'	Stadium: Deutschlandhalle; Attendance: 7,000

5 January 1984 3rd Match	Hertha BSC (West Germany)	2–2	(West Germany) Eintracht Frankfurt	Berlin, West Germany
	Meier; Skov	Report	Trieb 7', 18'	Stadium: Deutschlandhalle; Attendance: 6,000

5 January 1984 4th Match	Eintracht Frankfurt (West Germany)	3–4	(Hungary) Újpest Dózsa	Berlin, West Germany
	Falkenmayer; Trieb; Mattern	Report	Fekete; Szebegynski	Stadium: Deutschlandhalle; Attendance: 6,000

6 January 1984 5th Match	SC Charlottenburg (West Germany)	2–1	(West Germany) Eintracht Frankfurt	Berlin, West Germany
	Schlumberger; Vittinghoff	Report	Körbel	Stadium: Deutschlandhalle

6 January 1984 6th Match	Hertha BSC (West Germany)	3–2	(West Germany) Eintracht Frankfurt	Berlin, West Germany
	Ehrmantraut; Blau; Schmitz	Report	Kroth; Trieb	Stadium: Deutschlandhalle

===== Group Stage Table =====
Pos	Team	Pld	W	D	L	GF	GA	GD	Pts
1	Újpest Dózsa	6	4	1	1	12	9	+3	9
2	Hertha BSC	6	3	1	2	13	9	+4	7
3	SC Charlottenburg	6	2	2	2	8	11	−3	6
4	Eintracht Frankfurt	6	0	2	4	9	13	−4	2

Rules for classification: 1) Points

== Squad ==
=== Squad and statistics ===
No.	Pos	Nat	Player	Total		Bundesliga		DFB-Pokal		Relegation play-offs	
No.	Pos	Nat	Player	Apps	Goals	Apps	Goals	Apps	Goals	Apps	Goals
	GK	(West Germany) FRG	Joachim Jüriens	8	0	7	0	1	0	0	0
	GK	(West Germany) FRG	Jürgen Pahl	29	0	27	0	0	0	2	0
	DF	(West Germany) FRG	Thomas Berthold	31	3	28	3	1	0	2	0
	DF	(West Germany) FRG	Dirk Borkenhagen	1	0	1	0	0	0	0	0
	DF	(West Germany) FRG	Norbert Fruck	23	1	21	1	1	0	1	0
	DF	(West Germany) FRG	Charly Körbel	31	5	30	5	1	0	0	0
	DF	(West Germany) FRG	Armin Kraaz	30	0	28	0	0	0	2	0
	DF	(West Germany) FRG	Uwe Schreml	18	1	17	1	1	0	0	0
	DF	(West Germany) FRG	Martin Trieb	34	2	31	1	1	1	2	0
	MF	(West Germany) FRG	Ralf Falkenmayer	37	9	34	8	1	0	2	1
	MF	(West Germany) FRG	Thomas Kroth	32	4	30	4	0	0	2	0
	MF	(West Germany) FRG	Jürgen Mohr	14	1	12	1	0	0	2	0
	MF	(West Germany) FRG	Ralf Sievers	26	1	23	1	1	0	2	0
	MF	(West Germany) FRG	Michael Sziedat	18	1	17	1	1	0	0	0
	FW	(West Germany) FRG	Ronny Borchers	0	0	0	0	0	0	0	0
	FW	(West Germany) FRG	Günter Eymold	3	0	2	0	1	0	0	0
	FW	(West Germany) FRG	Thomas Kloss	2	0	2	0	0	0	0	0
	FW	(West Germany) FRG	Harald Krämer	9	1	6	0	1	0	2	1
	FW	(West Germany) FRG	Bodo Mattern	9	1	9	1	0	0	0	0
	FW	(West Germany) FRG	Uwe Müller	22	6	20	4	0	0	2	2
	FW	(West Germany) FRG	Dennis Reith	3	0	3	0	0	0	0	0
	FW	(Sweden) SWE	Jan Svensson	35	10	33	8	1	1	1	1
	FW	(Poland) POL	Cezary Tobollik	15	4	13	3	0	0	2	1

=== Transfers ===
In:

No.	Pos.	Nation	Player
—	DF	FRG	Dirk Borkenhagen (from Eintracht Frankfurt academy)
—	FW	FRG	Günter Eymold (from Hessen Kassel)
—	DF	FRG	Norbert Fruck (from MSV Duisburg)
—	FW	FRG	Thomas Kloss (from Eintracht Frankfurt academy)
—	DF	FRG	Armin Kraaz (from Eintracht Frankfurt academy)
—	FW	FRG	Harald Krämer (from Eintracht Frankfurt II)
—	FW	FRG	Bodo Mattern (from SV Darmstadt 98)
—	MF	FRG	Jürgen Mohr (from Hertha BSC)
—	FW	FRG	Dennis Rieth (from Eintracht Frankfurt II)
—	FW	SWE	Jan Svensson (from IFK Norrköping)
—	FW	POL	Cezary Tobollik (from KS Cracovia)

Out:

No.	Pos.	Nation	Player
—	FW	FRG	Holger Anthes (to VfL Osnabrück)
—	FW	KOR	Cha Bum-kun (to Bayer Leverkusen)
—	FW	FRG	Helmut Gulich (to Bayer Uerdingen)
—	FW	FRG	Josef Kaczor (to Eintracht Hamm)
—	DF	FRG	Mike Kahlhofen (to Eintracht Frankfurt II)
—	FW	FRG	Harald Karger (to SV Wiesbaden)
—	FW	FRG	Michael Künast (to Karlsruher SC)
—	MF	FRG	Stefan Lottermann (to 1. FC Nürnberg)
—	DF	FRG	Willi Neuberger (retired)
—	MF	FRG	Bernd Nickel (to BSC Young Boys)
—	DF	AUT	Bruno Pezzey (to Bayer Leverkusen)

== Sources ==
- Matheja, Ulrich (2011). Unsere Eintracht - Eintracht Frankfurt - Die Chronik. Die Werkstatt. ISBN 978-3-89533-750-5.
