= Harald Krämer =

German footballer

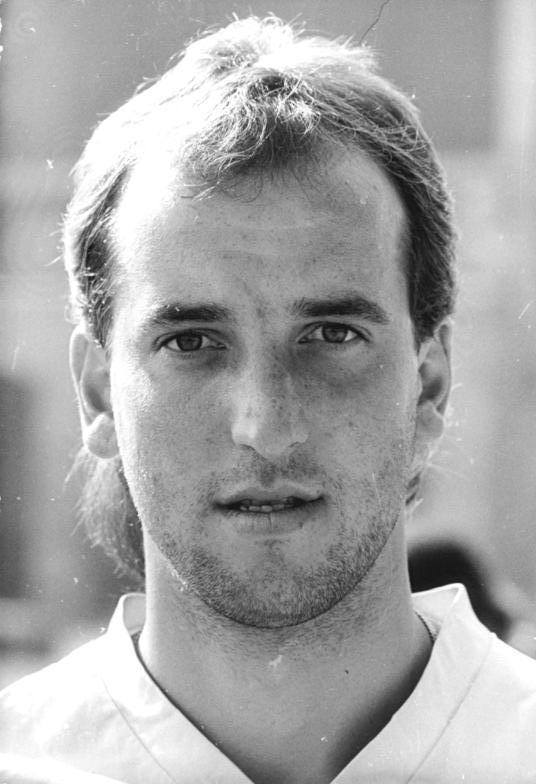
- Krämer with Chemnitzer FC in 1990

Personal information
- Date of birth: 13 February 1964
- Place of birth: Frankfurt, West Germany
- Position: Forward

Youth career
- –1978: VfB Unterliederbach
- 1978–1983: Eintracht Frankfurt

Senior career*
Years	Team	Apps	(Gls)
1983–1987	Eintracht Frankfurt	63	(17)
1987–1990	Sturm Graz	67	(30)
1990–1991	Chemnitzer FC	9	(3)
1991–1992	Hansa Rostock	6	(0)
1994	Sturm Graz	1	(0)
1994	FC Ligist		
1994–1995	VfB Unterliederbach		
1996	FC Ligist		
1997–2000	VfB Unterliederbach		
2000	Viktoria Kelsterbach		

International career
1985	West Germany U21	1	(0)
- * Club domestic league appearances and goals

Harald Krämer (born 13 February 1964) is a German former professional football forward who played club football with Eintracht Frankfurt, Sturm Graz, Chemnitzer FC and Hansa Rostock.

== Career ==
In his youth time Krämer played with VfB Unterliederbach before his move to Eintracht Frankfurt. With the Eintracht Under 17 he won the German championship in 1980, with the Under 19 team in 1982. There he played along with future professionals like Thomas Berthold, Ralf Falkenmayer, Uwe Müller, Holger Friz and Hans-Jürgen Gundelach. In 1983 he signed his first professional contract at the first team. Until his departure in 1987 he made 61 Bundesliga appearances and scored 15 goals.

Then the forward move to Austrian Bundesliga team Sturm Graz. In 1987–88 he was the third highest goal scorer after Rapid Wien's Zoran Stojadinović and Walter Knaller of Admira/Wacker. The domestic newspaper Kronenzeitung nicknamed Krämer Goldköpfchen (Little golden head) due to his strong aerial capabilities.

From 1990, Krämer signed for a year for Chemnitzer FC and then Hansa Rostock. In 1992, he finished his professional career due to sports invalidity. After that, Krämer played as an amateur for FC Ligist in Austria and Viktoria Kelsterbach before returned to his hometown club VfB Unterliederbach where he hung up his boots in 2000.

Nowadays Krämer regularly plays in the Eintracht Frankfurt alumni veterans teams along with former teammates like Charly Körbel, Ronny Borchers, Ralf Falkenmayer, Norbert Nachtweih and Ralf Weber.
