= Dimitrios Tsionanis =

German/Greek footballer

Personal information
- Date of birth: 31 August 1961 (age 65)
- Place of birth: Alistrati, Greece
- Position: Defender

Youth career
- 1976–1980: Waldhof Mannheim

Senior career*
Years	Team	Apps	(Gls)
1980–1991	Waldhof Mannheim	208	(6)
1991–1992	SV Mörlenbach		

International career
1986	Greece	1	(0)
- * Club domestic league appearances and goals

Dimitrios Tsionanis (Greek: Δημήτριος Τσιονάνης; born 31 August 1961) is a German / Greek former footballer.
