= Bernd Dierßen =

German association football player

Personal information
- Date of birth: 28 August 1959 (age 67)
- Place of birth: Lauenau, West Germany
- Height: 1.72 m (5 ft 8 in)
- Position: Midfielder

Youth career
- 1976–1977: Arminia Hannover

Senior career*
Years	Team	Apps	(Gls)
1977–1980	Arminia Hannover	92	(6)
1980–1983	Hannover 96	113	(15)
1983–1987	Schalke 04	124	(13)
1987–1990	Hannover 96	58	(6)
1990–1994	Preussen Hameln		
1994–1997	FC Stadthagen		

International career
1979–1981	West Germany U-21	6	(0)
- * Club domestic league appearances and goals

Bernd Dierßen (also spelled Dierssen, born 28 August 1959) is a retired German footballer. He made 140 appearances in the Bundesliga for Hannover 96 and Schalke 04 as well as 247 matches in the 2. Bundesliga for Arminia Hannover, Hannover 96 and Schalke.
