= Roland Dickgießer =

German footballer and manager

Personal information
- Date of birth: 9 November 1960 (age 65)
- Place of birth: Bruchsal, West Germany
- Height: 1.80 m (5 ft 11 in)
- Position: Defender

Youth career
- –1976: TSV Bad Langenbrücken
- 1976–1978: Waldhof Mannheim

Senior career*
Years	Team	Apps	(Gls)
1978–1994	Waldhof Mannheim	462	(16)
Total		462	(16)

International career
1979	West Germany Amateur	5	(0)
1981–1982	West Germany U-21	4	(0)
1983–1984	West Germany Olympic	7	(0)

Managerial career
- 1995–1996: Waldhof Mannheim
- 2005: TSG Hoffenheim
- 2007–2011: FC Astoria Walldorf
- * Club domestic league appearances and goals

Roland Dickgießer (born 9 November 1960) is a German former professional footballer who played as a defender.
