= Wolfgang April =

Polish footballer (born 1959)

Personal information
- Birth name: Bogusław Kwiecień
- Date of birth: 3 September 1959 (age 66)
- Place of birth: Kluczbork, Poland
- Position: Defender

Senior career*
Years	Team	Apps	(Gls)
–1979	Stal Mielec		
1979–1983	Gwardia Koszalin		
1983–1984	Stal Mielec		
1984–1985	Eintracht Frankfurt	6	(0)
1985=1986	SpVgg Bayreuth	12	(0)
1986–1987	Sabadell	7	(1)
1987–1989	SpVgg Bad Homburg		
1989–1991	FC Glarus		
- * Club domestic league appearances and goals

Wolfgang April (born Bogusław Kwiecień; born 3 September 1959) is a Polish-German former professional footballer who played as a defender.
