= Thomas Kroth =

German former professional football (born 1959)

Personal information
- Full name: Thomas Kroth
- Date of birth: 26 August 1959 (age 67)
- Place of birth: Erlenbach am Main, West Germany
- Height: 1.77 m (5 ft 10 in)
- Position: Midfielder

Youth career
- 1967–1975: SV Erlenbach
- 1975–1977: Kickers Offenbach

Senior career*
Years	Team	Apps	(Gls)
1977–1978	Kickers Offenbach	1	(0)
1978–1982	1. FC Köln	56	(2)
1982–1985	Eintracht Frankfurt	74	(13)
1985–1988	Hamburger SV	73	(6)
1989–1990	Borussia Dortmund	53	(0)
Total		257	(21)

International career
1980–1984	West Germany U21	13	(1)
1985	West Germany	1	(0)
- * Club domestic league appearances and goals

Thomas Kroth (born 26 August 1959) is a German former professional football who played as a midfielder.

== Club career ==
Kroth won the DFB-Pokal in 1987 with Hamburger SV and in 1989 with Borussia Dortmund. He played in more than 250 West German top-flight matches.

== International career ==
In 1985, he earned one cap for West Germany against Hungary.

== Later career ==
Nowadays he is executive director of the agency PRO Profil, which merchandises and takes care of sportsmen.

== Honours ==
Hamburger SV

- DFB-Pokal: 1986–87

Borussia Dortmund

- DFB-Pokal: 1988–89
- DFL-Supercup: 1989
