= Cezary Tobollik =

Polish footballer

Personal information
- Full name: Cezary Wilhelm Tobollik
- Date of birth: 22 October 1961 (age 65)
- Place of birth: Mielec, Poland
- Height: 1.82 m (6 ft 0 in)
- Position: Striker

Senior career*
Years	Team	Apps	(Gls)
–1981	Stal Mielec	9	(0)
1981–1982	Stal Rzeszów		
1982–1983	Cracovia	29	(6)
1983–1985	Eintracht Frankfurt	42	(12)
1985–1986	Viktoria Aschaffenburg	37	(18)
1986–1989	RC Lens	90	(13)
1989–1990	Waldhof Mannheim		
1990–1991	Kickers Offenbach	24	(2)
1993–1998	Viktoria Aschaffenburg		
2000–2001	FC Viktoria Kahl		
- * Club domestic league appearances and goals

Cezary Wilhelm Tobollik (born 22 October 1961) is a Polish former professional footballer who played as a striker.

In July 1983, after Cracovia's match with Sturm Graz in Austria, Tobollik didn't join back his teammates, and stayed in Austria. Afterwards, he crossed the border with West Germany, and emigrated to Bavaria, where he eventually joined his parents in Aschaffenburg, who emigrated there from communist Poland already earlier.
