= Klaus Theiss =

German footballer

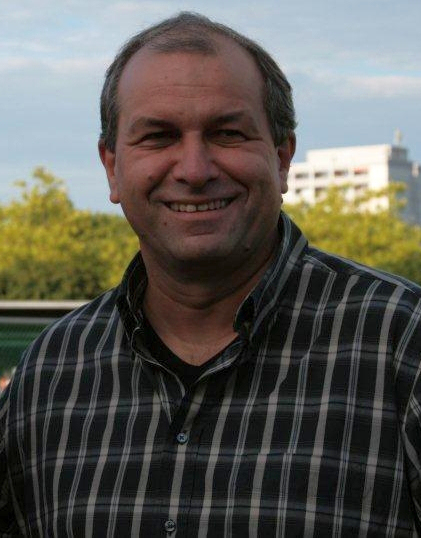
- Theiss in July 2010

Personal information
- Full name: Klaus Theiss
- Date of birth: 9 July 1963 (age 63)
- Place of birth: Nagold, West Germany
- Height: 1.84 m (6 ft 1/2 in)
- Position: Sweeper

Youth career
- 1978–1981: TuS Ergenzingen

Senior career*
Years	Team	Apps	(Gls)
1981–1985	Karlsruher SC	125	(8)
1985–1987	Eintracht Frankfurt	42	(9)
1987–1988	Hamburger SV	0	(0)
1988–1989	Viktoria Aschaffenburg	36	(1)
1989–1991	FC Homburg	34	(3)
1993	Tennis Borussia Berlin	3	(0)
Total		240	(21)

International career
1981	Germany U18	1	(0)
1985–1986	Germany U21	2	(0)
- * Club domestic league appearances and goals

Klaus Theiss (born 9 July 1963 in Nagold) is a German former professional footballer. He made a total of 146 appearances in the Bundesliga and 94 in the 2. Bundesliga during his playing career.
