= Armin Kraaz =

German footballer and manager

Personal information
- Full name: Armin Kraaz
- Date of birth: 3 February 1965 (age 61)
- Place of birth: Frankfurt, West Germany
- Position: Defender

Team information
- Current team: Eintracht Frankfurt

Youth career
- –1979: SV Viktoria Preußen 07
- 1979–1983: Eintracht Frankfurt

Senior career*
Years	Team	Apps	(Gls)
1983–1988	Eintracht Frankfurt	123	(3)
1988–1996	Rot-Weiss Frankfurt		
1997	Eintracht Frankfurt II		

Managerial career
- 2002: Eintracht Frankfurt (caretaker manager)
- * Club domestic league appearances and goals

Armin Kraaz (born 3 February 1965) is a German football manager and former player.

The former defender played for Viktoria Preußen until 1979 and then moved to Eintracht Frankfurt. From 1983 to 1984 he was fielded in the pro squad, appearing in 123 Bundesliga fixtures, netting three goals. In 1988, he went to Rot-Weiss Frankfurt. His departure from Eintracht was a painful one as after the DFB Cup victory of the Eagles he sat crying on the bench as an unused sub.

In 1996, he joined the Eintracht coaching staff and firstly managed the Under-19 team. In March 1997, he shortly played for the Eintracht reserves and carried on to manage the Under-19 team. In January 2001 he was promoted to become assistant manager of the pro team. Between 8 March and 27 May 2002 was caretaker for the Eagles.

At present he is the director of the Eintracht youth academy.
