= Peter Lux =

German footballer (born 1962)

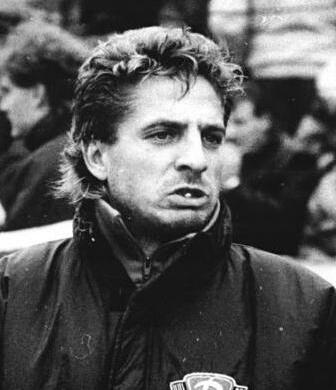
- Lux in 1990

Personal information
- Date of birth: 4 October 1962 (age 64)
- Place of birth: Salzgitter, West Germany
- Height: 1.68 m (5 ft 6 in)
- Position: Midfielder

Youth career
- Union Salzgitter
- –1979: Sportfreunde Salzgitter
- 1979–1981: Eintracht Braunschweig

Senior career*
Years	Team	Apps	(Gls)
1981–1985	Eintracht Braunschweig	87	(15)
1985–1987	Hamburger SV	56	(7)
1987–1990	SV Waldhof Mannheim	84	(9)
1990	Dynamo Dresden	5	(0)
1990–1993	Eintracht Braunschweig	48	(4)
1993–1996	Wolfenbütteler SV	68	(24)

International career
1983–1984	West Germany Olympic	5	(0)

Managerial career
- 1995–1999: Wolfenbütteler SV
- 2003: Germania Wolfenbüttel
- 2003–2004: Hötzumer SV
- 2004–2005: Sportfreunde Salzgitter
- 2008–2014: MTV Wolfenbüttel
- * Club domestic league appearances and goals

Peter Lux (born 4 October 1962) is a German former professional footballer.

== Career ==
Lux began his senior career at Eintracht Braunschweig in 1981. After the club's relegation from the Bundesliga, he transferred to Hamburger SV. In total, Lux played eight seasons in the Bundesliga for Braunschweig, Hamburg, and Waldhof Mannheim, as well as one season in the first-tier NOFV-Oberliga in former East Germany for Dynamo Dresden. He left Dresden during the winter break of the 1990–91 season to return to Braunschweig, now in the 2. Bundesliga.

=== International career ===
Lux also represented Germany at the 1984 Summer Olympics.

=== Honours ===
- Bundesliga: runner-up 1986–87
- DFB-Pokal: 1986–87

== Post-retirement ==
After retiring as a player, Lux became a golf coach, and also managed several amateur teams in the Wolfenbüttel/Salzgitter area.
