= Ralf Falkenmayer =

German former professional footballer

Personal information
- Full name: Ralf Falkenmayer
- Date of birth: 11 February 1963 (age 63)
- Place of birth: Frankfurt, West Germany
- Height: 1.75 m (5 ft 9 in)
- Position: Midfielder

Youth career
- 1968–1979: SV Niederursel
- 1979–1980: Eintracht Frankfurt

Senior career*
Years	Team	Apps	(Gls)
1980–1987	Eintracht Frankfurt	173	(18)
1987–1989	Bayer Leverkusen	48	(7)
1989–1996	Eintracht Frankfurt	164	(12)
1996–1998	Eintracht Trier		

International career
1982–1986	West Germany U-21	16	(0)
1984	West Germany Olympic	1	(0)
1984–1986	West Germany	4	(0)
- * Club domestic league appearances and goals

Ralf Falkenmayer (born 11 February 1963) is a German former professional footballer who played as a defensive midfielder.

== Career ==
Falkenmayer made 385 Bundesliga appearances for Eintracht Frankfurt and Bayer Leverkusen. With Eintracht he won the DFB-Pokal in 1981 and with Bayer Leverkusen the UEFA Cup in 1988, despite missing his penalty in the shootout in the final.

For the West Germany national team he was capped four times between 1984 and 1986. He took part with West Germany at the Euro 1984 in France.

== Honours ==
Eintracht Frankfurt

- DFB-Pokal: 1980–81

Bayer Leverkusen

- UEFA Cup: 1987–88
