= Thomas Berthold =

German footballer and manager

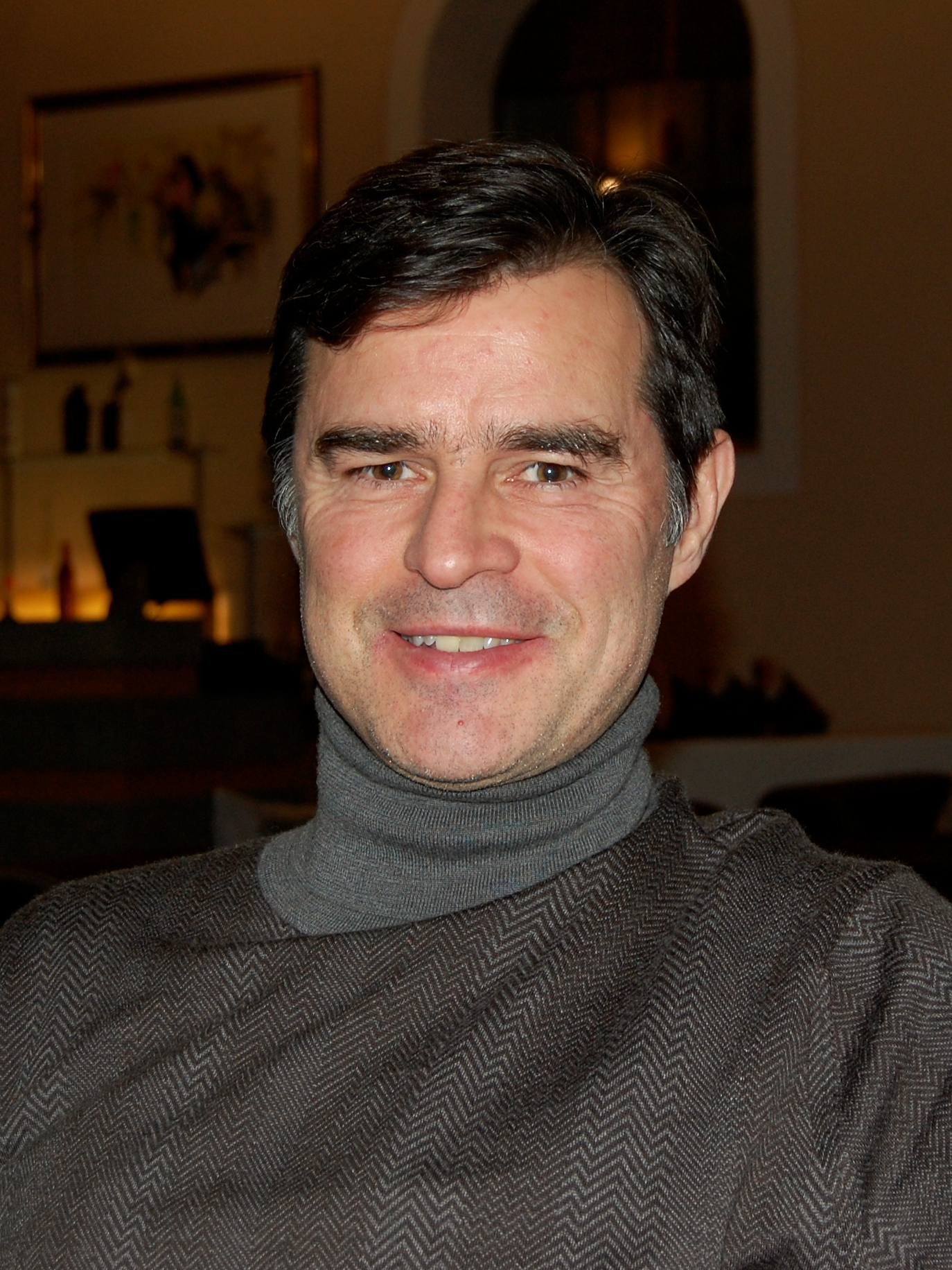
- Berthold in 2014

Personal information
- Full name: Thomas Berthold
- Date of birth: 12 November 1964 (age 62)
- Place of birth: Hanau, West Germany
- Height: 1.85 m (6 ft 1 in)
- Position: Defender

Youth career
- –1978: KEWA Wachenbuchen
- 1978–1982: Eintracht Frankfurt

Senior career*
Years	Team	Apps	(Gls)
1982–1987	Eintracht Frankfurt	111	(17)
1987–1989	Verona	52	(2)
1989–1991	Roma	62	(3)
1991–1993	Bayern Munich	30	(1)
1993–2000	VfB Stuttgart	191	(4)
2001	Adanaspor	5	(0)
Total		451	(27)

International career
1984–1986	West Germany U21	5	(0)
1985–1994	(West) Germany	62	(1)
Medal record
AS Roma
Winner	Coppa Italia	1991
Runner-up	UEFA Cup	1991
VfB Stuttgart
Winner	DFB-Pokal	1997
Runner-up	DFB Liga-Pokal	1997
Runner-up	UEFA Cup Winners' Cup	1998
Runner-up	DFB Liga-Pokal	1998
West Germany
Runner-up	FIFA World Cup	1986
Winner	FIFA World Cup	1990
- * Club domestic league appearances and goals

Thomas Berthold (born 12 November 1964) is a former German footballer and manager, who played as a defender. He currently works as a pundit and analyst for several TV stations.

== Club career ==
Berthold was born in Hanau, Hesse. His first club was TuSpV KeWa Wachenbuchen before he joined the youth ranks of SG Eintracht Frankfurt in 1978.

He played 332 games in the Bundesliga, scoring 22 goals. He began his career in 1982 with Eintracht Frankfurt and played for them until 1987. From 1987 until 1991 he played in Italy: for Hellas Verona FC (1987–1989) and AS Roma (1989–1991). He then returned to Germany, signing for FC Bayern Munich (1991–1993) and VfB Stuttgart (1993–2000). Berthold's last season as an active player was with the Turkish league club Adanaspor for whom he played until 15 January 2001.

== International career ==
Between 1985 and 1994 Berthold made 62 international appearances, scoring 1 goal, for the West German and German national teams, participating in the 1986 World Cup in Mexico and 1988 European Championships in West Germany. He was a member of the West German team which won the 1990 World Cup, but wasn't in the German team which took second place in the European Championships in Sweden in 1992. His last appearance in international competition came shortly after the 1994 World Cup.

== Career statistics ==
=== Club ===
Club performance			League		Cup		League Cup		Continental		Total	
Season	Club	League	Apps	Goals	Apps	Goals	Apps	Goals	Apps	Goals	Apps	Goals
Germany			League		DFB-Pokal		Other		Europe		Total	
1982–83	Eintracht Frankfurt	Bundesliga	7	1	0	0	—		—		7	1
1983–84	Eintracht Frankfurt	Bundesliga	28	3	1	0	2	0	—		31	3
1984–85	Eintracht Frankfurt	Bundesliga	30	7	2	0	—		—		32	7
1985–86	Eintracht Frankfurt	Bundesliga	25	2	1	1	—		—		26	3
1986–87	Eintracht Frankfurt	Bundesliga	21	4	4	0	—		—		25	4
Italy			League		Coppa Italia		League Cup		Europe		Total	
1987–88	Verona	Serie A	28	1	7	1	—		7	1	42	3
1988–89	Verona	Serie A	24	1	8	0	—		—		32	1
1989–90	Roma	Serie A	32	2	6	0	—		—		38	2
1990–91	Roma	Serie A	30	1	7	2	—		12	0	49	3
Germany			League		DFB-Pokal		Other		Europe		Total	
1991–92	Bayern Munich	Bundesliga	30	1	1	0	0	0	4	0	35	1
1992–93	Bayern Munich	Bundesliga	0	0	—		—		—		0	0
1993–94	VfB Stuttgart	Bundesliga	31	0	1	0	—		—		32	0
1994–95	VfB Stuttgart	Bundesliga	29	1	3	1	—		—		32	2
1995–96	VfB Stuttgart	Bundesliga	27	0	1	0	—		—		28	0
1996–97	VfB Stuttgart	Bundesliga	28	2	3	0	—		1	0	32	2
1997–98	VfB Stuttgart	Bundesliga	31	1	5	0	2	0	6	0	44	1
1998–99	VfB Stuttgart	Bundesliga	22	0	3	0	3	0	4	0	32	0
1999–2000	VfB Stuttgart	Bundesliga	23	0	3	0	—		—		26	0
Turkey			League		Turkish Cup		Other		Europe		Total	
2000-01	Adanaspor	1. Lig	5	0	—		—		—		5	0
Total			451	27	56	5	7	0	34	1	548	33

=== International ===
Germany national team
Year	Apps	Goals
1985	9	1
1986	12	0
1987	2	0
1988	5	0
1989	3	0
1990	15	0
1991	3	0
1994	13	0
Total	62	1

=== International goals ===
Score and results list West Germany's goal tally first.

#	Date	Venue	Opponent	Score	Result	Competition
1.	30 April 1985	Strahov Stadium, Prague	Czechoslovakia	1–0	5–1	1986 World Cup qualifier

== Honours ==
=== Club ===
Roma

- Coppa Italia: 1990–91
- UEFA Cup: Runner-up 1990–91

VfB Stuttgart

- DFB-Pokal: 1996–97
- DFB-Ligapokal: Runner-up 1997, 1998
- UEFA Cup Winners' Cup: Runner-up 1997–98

=== International ===
Germany

- FIFA World Cup: 1990; Runner-up 1986

=== Individual ===
- Onze Mondial: 1986, 1987
- kicker Bundesliga Team of the Season: 1993–94

== Media career ==
- On 10 June 2006, he appeared in BBC's sports quiz A Question of Sport – World Cup special preceding England's opening game in the finals.
- He is a frequent football pundit/analyst for German TV channels Sport1 and Liga total!.
- Berthold was the onfield anchorman for Eurosport's pan-European coverage of the UEFA Women's Euro 2013 commenting as well as interviewing players and coaches in English, German, Italian and Spanish.
- He appeared as a color commentator for n-tv's German language coverage of the 2013 Audi Cup.
- He appeared as a frequent pundit for British Eurosport's 2014 World Cup coverage.
- In August 2020, he spoke at a demonstration in Stuttgart, protesting against the anti-coronavirus measures introduced by the national government.
