= Uwe Müller =

German footballer

Personal information
- Full name: Uwe Müller
- Date of birth: 16 October 1963 (age 63)
- Place of birth: Langenselbold, West Germany
- Position: Midfielder

Youth career
- 1978: SpVgg Langenselbold
- 1978–1982: Eintracht Frankfurt

Senior career*
Years	Team	Apps	(Gls)
1982–1988	Eintracht Frankfurt	131	(18)
1988–1994	FC Admira/Wacker		
1994–1995	Austria Wien		
1995–1996	FC (SCN) Admira/Wacker		
1997	SC Eisenstadt		
1997–1998	FV Steinau		
1998	Eintracht Oberissigheim		

International career
	Germany Under-21	6	(?)
- * Club domestic league appearances and goals

Uwe Müller (born 16 October 1963 in Langenselbold) is a German former professional football player.

He appeared in 131 German Bundesliga fixtures for Eintracht Frankfurt and scored 18 goals. In the Austrian Bundesliga, he was fielded 235 times for FC Admira/Wacker and Austria Wien.

Since 2002, he works in the football academy of Eintracht Frankfurt.
