= 1987–88 Eintracht Frankfurt season =

Eintracht Frankfurt
1987-88 season
- Chairman: Klaus Gramlich
- Manager: Karl-Heinz Feldkamp
- Bundesliga: 9th
- DFB-Pokal: Winner
- Top goalscorer: League: Lajos Détári (11); All: Lajos Détári (14)
- Highest home attendance: 51,000 19 March 1988 v Bayern Munich (league)
- Lowest home attendance: 9,000 (on two occasions)(league)
- Average home league attendance: 21,294
Home colours	Away colours

The 1987–88 Eintracht Frankfurt season was the 88th season in the club's football history. In 1987–88 the club played in the Bundesliga, the top tier of German football. It was the club's 25th season in the Bundesliga.

The season ended up with Eintracht winning the DFB-Pokal for the fourth time.

== Matches ==
=== Legend ===
Win Draw Loss Postponed

=== Friendlies ===
12 July 1987	TG 1907 Leun (West Germany)	0–12	(West Germany) Eintracht Frankfurt
17:00 CEST		(Report)	Heitkamp 18' (pen.), 29', 70' (pen.); Balzis 39', 48'; Détári 53' (pen.), 55' (pen.), 81', 86'; Turowski 61', 78'; Schulz 66'	Referee: Mahr

14 July 1987	SV Geinsheim (West Germany)	1–6	(West Germany) Eintracht Frankfurt
	Riegel 23'	(Report)	Friz 21', 42', 88'; Kitzmann 50'; Klepper 61'; Smolarek 86'	Attendance: 1,500; Referee: Heiliger

16 July 1987	TSV Sulzbach (West Germany)	0–7	(West Germany) Eintracht Frankfurt	Weinheim, West Germany
		(Report)	Heitkamp 25'; Möller 30'; Smolarek 38'; Schulz 40'; Haub 53'; Friz 66'; Biernat 70'	Stadium: Sepp-Herberger-Stadion; Attendance: 1,000

18 July 1987	FC St. Gallen (Switzerland)	0–0	(West Germany) Eintracht Frankfurt	St. Gallen, Switzerland
		(Report)		Stadium: Espenmoos-Stadion; Attendance: 1,300

21 July 1987	Grasshopper Club Zürich (Switzerland)	3–3 (a.e.t.) (5–4 p)	(West Germany) Eintracht Frankfurt	Kriens, Switzerland
20:30 CEST	Egli 3'; Gren 54'; Koller 64'	(Report)	Balzis 1'; Turowski 74'; Haub 84'	Attendance: 2,000; Referee: Röthlisberger

23 July 1987	SC Kriens (Switzerland)	1–4	(West Germany) Eintracht Frankfurt	Kriens, Switzerland
	Möller 75'	(Report)	Sievers 6'; Münn 25'; Balzis 35'; Biernat 79'	Attendance: 2,500; Referee: Mumentaler

24 July 1987	FC Sarnen (Switzerland)	1–17	(West Germany) Eintracht Frankfurt	Sarnen, Switzerland
	Goal	(Report)	Balzis; Friz; Möller; Turowski; Klepper; Münn; Müller; Détári; Kitzmann	Attendance: 800

25 July 1987	FC Aarau (Switzerland)	1–5	(West Germany) Eintracht Frankfurt	Aarau, Switzerland
	Herberth 79'	(Report)	Smolarek 19'; Schulz 53', 86' (pen.); Détári 61'; Körbel 68'	Attendance: 1,800

27 July 1987	SpVgg Bad Homburg (West Germany)	2–0	(West Germany) Eintracht Frankfurt	Bad Homburg, West Germany
19:00 CEST	Henninger 69'; Cakici 81'	(Report)		Stadium: Sportplatz an der Sandelmühle; Attendance: 1,800; Referee: Hartmann

11 August 1987	VfB Unterliederbach (West Germany)	0–6	(West Germany) Eintracht Frankfurt
19:00 CEST		(Report)	Haub 7', 86'; Körbel 40'; Möller 47', 66'; Kraaz 87'	Attendance: 1,400

22 August 1987	TSG Backnang (West Germany)	3–9	(West Germany) Eintracht Frankfurt	Backnang, West Germany
	Peuckert 4'; Roger 70'; Bohmwetsch 78'	(Report)	Détári 7', 10' (pen.), 26' (pen.), 52'; Müller 30'; Schulz 34'; Balzis 67'; Turowski 79'; Kostner 87'	Attendance: 1,000; Referee: Kleiber

7 September 1987	Bundeswehr XI (West Germany)	4–9	(West Germany) Eintracht Frankfurt	Mainz, West Germany
	Balzis 34', 71'; Schlosser 49', 80'	(Report)	Turowski 13'; Heitkamp 16', 17', 52', 83'; Friz 29'; Kostner 54'; Biernat 69'; Kitzmann 78'	Stadium: Rasenplatz der Kurmainz-Kaserne; Attendance: 300; Referee: Haupt

13 September 1987	Niddatal XI (West Germany)	2–19	(West Germany) Eintracht Frankfurt	Niddatal, West Germany
16:30 CEST	Guijarro 40'; Mücke 86'	(Report)	Friz 10', 54', 64', 66'; Heitkamp 18', 27', 29', 42', 84'; Turowski 23', 35', 50', 52', 59'; Haub 25', 56'; Münn 72'; Kitzmann 74'; Kraaz 88'	Stadium: Sportplatz Bönstadt; Attendance: 1,000; Referee: Kost

19 September 1987	East Hesse XI (West Germany)	0–13	(West Germany) Eintracht Frankfurt	Schlüchtern, West Germany
16:00 CEST		(Report)	Friz 2', 5', 59', 81'; Schlindwein 4'; Turowski 8'; Roth 10'; Haub 11'; Heitkamp 15' (pen.); Kraaz 17' (pen.); Karger 20'; Münn 30'; Biernat 31'	Attendance: 1,000; Referee: Stoss

22 September 1987	Herborn XI (West Germany)	0–6	(West Germany) Eintracht Frankfurt	Herborn, West Germany
16:30 CEST		(Report)	Turowski 26', 41', 77'; Schulz 39'; Friz 50'; Heitkamp 72'	Stadium: Rehberg-Stadion; Attendance: 1,000; Referee: Kreft

18 October 1987	FSV Steinbach (West Germany)	1–7	(West Germany) Eintracht Frankfurt
	Ziegelmeier	(Report)	Münn; Sievers; Haub; Schlindwein; Turowski; Détári	Attendance: 800

1 November 1987	FSV Frankfurt (West Germany)	1–4	(West Germany) Eintracht Frankfurt	Frankfurt, West Germany
14:00 CEST	Bär 79'	(Report)	Turowski 56', 58', 75'; Möller 65'	Stadium: Stadion am Bornheimer Hang; Attendance: 900; Referee: Wujanz

17 November 1987	1. FC Sulzbach (West Germany)	2–12	(West Germany) Eintracht Frankfurt	Sulzbach, West Germany
19:00 CEST	Köhler 56'; Löschhorn 81'	(Report)	Smolarek 4'; Heitkamp 7', 15', 27', 49', 65', 80'; Schulz 22'; Zorn 23' (o.g.); Kraaz 31'; Klepper 52'; Kostner 75'	Attendance: 1,000; Referee: Altvater

8 January 1988 Stuttgart indoor football tournament (preliminary round)	VfB Stuttgart (West Germany)	2–1	(West Germany) Eintracht Frankfurt	Stuttgart, West Germany
	Walter	(Report)	Détári	Stadium: Hanns-Martin-Schleyer-Halle; Attendance: 7,000

8 January 1988 Stuttgart indoor football tournament (preliminary round)	Eintracht Frankfurt (West Germany)	3–4	(West Germany) 1. FC Nürnberg	Stuttgart, West Germany
	Smolarek; Détári	(Report)	Grahammer	Stadium: Hanns-Martin-Schleyer-Halle; Attendance: 7,000

8 January 1988 Stuttgart indoor football tournament (preliminary round)	Eintracht Frankfurt (West Germany)	5–1	(Brazil) Atlético Mineiro	Stuttgart, West Germany
	Smolarek	(Report)	Goal	Stadium: Hanns-Martin-Schleyer-Halle; Attendance: 7,000

15 January 1988 Frankfurt indoor football tournament (preliminary round)	Eintracht Frankfurt (West Germany)	3–0	(West Germany) 1. FC Köln	Frankfurt, West Germany
	Détári; Smolarek	(Report)		Stadium: Eissporthalle; Attendance: 6,000

15 January 1988 Frankfurt indoor football tournament (preliminary round)	Eintracht Frankfurt (West Germany)	3–2	(West Germany) Kickers Offenbach	Frankfurt, West Germany
	Roth; Détári; Smolarek	(Report)	Baier; Thiel	Stadium: Eissporthalle; Attendance: 6,000

15 January 1988 Frankfurt indoor football tournament (preliminary round)	Eintracht Frankfurt (West Germany)	2–3	(West Germany) FSV Frankfurt	Frankfurt, West Germany
	Goal	(Report)	Goal	Stadium: Eissporthalle; Attendance: 6,000

16 January 1988 Frankfurt indoor football tournament (preliminary round)	Eintracht Frankfurt (West Germany)	3–0	(West Germany) Werder Bremen	Frankfurt, West Germany
	Smolarek; Binz; Balzis	(Report)		Stadium: Eissporthalle; Attendance: 7,000

16 January 1988 Frankfurt indoor football tournament (preliminary round)	Eintracht Frankfurt (West Germany)	4–2	(West Germany) Rot-Weiss Frankfurt	Frankfurt, West Germany
	Binz; Détári; Smolarek	(Report)	Peukert; Schlichting	Stadium: Eissporthalle; Attendance: 7,000

16 January 1988 Frankfurt indoor football tournament (Semi-Finals)	Eintracht Frankfurt (West Germany)	2–0	(West Germany) FSV Frankfurt	Frankfurt, West Germany
	Balzis; Détári	(Report)		Stadium: Eissporthalle; Attendance: 7,000

16 January 1988 Frankfurt indoor football tournament (Finals)	Eintracht Frankfurt (West Germany)	0–1	(West Germany) Werder Bremen	Frankfurt, West Germany
		(Report)	Burgsmüller	Stadium: Eissporthalle; Attendance: 7,000

17 January 1988 Heuchelheim indoor football tournament	VfL Marburg (West Germany)	0–1	(West Germany) Eintracht Frankfurt	Heuchelheim, West Germany
		(Report)	Müller	Attendance: 1,500

17 January 1988 Heuchelheim indoor football tournament	ASV Gießen (West Germany)	0–2	(West Germany) Eintracht Frankfurt	Heuchelheim, West Germany
		(Report)	Heitkamp; Müller	Attendance: 1,500

17 January 1988 Heuchelheim indoor football tournament	SKG Rodheim (West Germany)	1–3	(West Germany) Eintracht Frankfurt	Heuchelheim, West Germany
	Schulz	(Report)		Attendance: 1,500

17 January 1988 Heuchelheim indoor football tournament	TSF Heuchelheim (West Germany)	1–7	(West Germany) Eintracht Frankfurt	Heuchelheim, West Germany
	Goal	(Report)	Schulz; Müller; Klepper; Smolarek	Attendance: 1,500

19 January 1988	SpVgg Neu-Isenburg (West Germany)	0–0	(West Germany) Eintracht Frankfurt	Neu-Isenburg, West Germany
18:30 CEST		(Report)		Attendance: 500; Referee: Rodríguez

22 January 1988 Mannheim indoor football tournament (preliminary round)	VfR Mannheim (West Germany)	0–4	(West Germany) Eintracht Frankfurt	Mannheim, West Germany
		(Report)	Goal	Stadium: Eisstadion am Friedrichspark; Attendance: 6,000

22 January 1988 Mannheim indoor football tournament (preliminary round)	1. FC Kaiserslautern (West Germany)	3–3	(West Germany) Eintracht Frankfurt	Mannheim, West Germany
	Goal	(Report)	Goal	Stadium: Eisstadion am Friedrichspark; Attendance: 6,000

22 January 1988 Mannheim indoor football tournament (preliminary round)	Eintracht Frankfurt (West Germany)	1–0	(West Germany) Hamburger SV	Mannheim, West Germany
	Smolarek	(Report)		Stadium: Eisstadion am Friedrichspark; Attendance: 6,000

23 January 1988 Mannheim indoor football tournament (Semi-Finals)	SV Waldhof Mannheim (West Germany)	2–4	(West Germany) Eintracht Frankfurt	Mannheim, West Germany
	Goal	(Report)	Détári	Stadium: Eisstadion am Friedrichspark; Attendance: 6,000

23 January 1988 Mannheim indoor football tournament (Finals)	Eintracht Frankfurt (West Germany)	4–7	(West Germany) Werder Bremen	Mannheim, West Germany
	Körbel; Binz; Détári	(Report)	Votava; Meier; Schaaf; Burgsmüller	Stadium: Eisstadion am Friedrichspark; Attendance: 6,000

24 January 1988 Münster indoor football tournament (preliminary round)	Münster XI (West Germany)	2–7	(West Germany) Eintracht Frankfurt	Münster, West Germany
	Goal	(Report)	Détári; Haub; Sievers; Müller; Kostner	Stadium: Halle Münsterland; Attendance: 3,500

24 January 1988 Münster indoor football tournament (preliminary round)	VfL Bochum (West Germany)	3–3	(West Germany) Eintracht Frankfurt	Münster, West Germany
	Woelk; Riedmann	(Report)	Détári; Smolarek; Stein	Stadium: Halle Münsterland; Attendance: 3,500

24 January 1988 Münster indoor football tournament (Semi-Finals)	VfL Osnabrück (West Germany)	1–1 (a.e.t.)	(West Germany) Eintracht Frankfurt	Münster, West Germany
	Melchies	(Report)	Smolarek	Stadium: Halle Münsterland; Attendance: 3,500

24 January 1988 Münster indoor football tournament (3rd place play-off)	VfL Bochum (West Germany)	5–6	(West Germany) Eintracht Frankfurt	Münster, West Germany
	Woelk; Reekers; Legat	(Report)	Heitkamp; Schulz; Smolarek; Balzis; o.g.'	Stadium: Halle Münsterland; Attendance: 3,500

29 January 1988 German indoor football final tournament (preliminary round)	Eintracht Frankfurt (West Germany)	2–1	(West Germany) Blau-Weiß 90 Berlin	Frankfurt, West Germany
	Détári; Smolarek	(Report)	Wielga	Stadium: Festhalle; Attendance: 1,361

29 January 1988 German indoor football final tournament (preliminary round)	Eintracht Frankfurt (West Germany)	6–1	(West Germany) Fortuna Düsseldorf	Frankfurt, West Germany
	Détári; Sievers; Haub; Smolarek; Schulz	(Report)	Wojtowicz	Stadium: Festhalle; Attendance: 1,361

30 January 1988 German indoor football final tournament (Semi-Finals)	Eintracht Frankfurt (West Germany)	4–4 (a.e.t.)	(West Germany) VfL Osnabrück	Frankfurt, West Germany
	Smolarek; Binz; Körbel; Détári	(Report)	Jaschke; Helmer; Zeravica; Linz; Wallenhorst	Stadium: Festhalle; Attendance: 1,361

30 January 1988 German indoor football final tournament (Finals)	Eintracht Frankfurt (West Germany)	3–5	(West Germany) Bayer Uerdingen	Frankfurt, West Germany
	Détári; Körbel; Smolarek	(Report)	Klinger; Prytz; Fach; Witeczek	Stadium: Festhalle; Attendance: 1,361

2 February 1988	FV Bad Vilbel (West Germany)	1–10	(West Germany) Eintracht Frankfurt	Bad Vilbel, West Germany
	Pross 44'	(Report)	Haub 13'; Balzis 28', 42', 72'; Friz 50'; Turowski 51', 57'; Kraaz 63'; Heitkamp 66', 78'	Attendance: 800; Referee: Wujanz

10 February 1988	Stade Lavallois (France)	0–3	(West Germany) Eintracht Frankfurt	Saint-Jean-de-Monts, France
		(Report)	Turowski 58', 67', 85'	Attendance: 600

=== Bundesliga ===
==== League fixtures and results ====
1 August 1987 1	1. FC Kaiserslautern	2–2	Eintracht Frankfurt	Kaiserslautern, West Germany
15:30 CEST	Kohr 16', 45'	(Report)	Schulz 71'; Turowski 73'	Stadium: Fritz-Walter-Stadion; Attendance: 21,000; Referee: Wiesel

7 August 1987 2	Eintracht Frankfurt	0–1	VfL Bochum	Frankfurt, West Germany
20:00 CEST		(Report)	Leifeld 54'	Stadium: Waldstadion; Attendance: 20,000; Referee: Matheis

14 August 1987 3	Bayer Uerdingen	3–0	Eintracht Frankfurt	Krefeld, West Germany
20:00 CEST	Mathy 61', 68'; Prytz 77'	(Report)		Stadium: Grotenburg-Stadion; Attendance: 12,000; Referee: Föckler

19 August 1987 4	Eintracht Frankfurt	0–2	VfB Stuttgart	Frankfurt, West Germany
20:00 CEST		(Report)	Fritz Walter 66', 76'	Stadium: Waldstadion; Attendance: 30,000; Referee: Pauly

25 August 1987 5	Bayer Leverkusen	1–3	Eintracht Frankfurt	Leverkusen, West Germany
19:30 CEST	Buncol 4'	(Report)	Möller 55', 76'; Smolarek 80'	Stadium: Ulrich-Haberland-Stadion; Attendance: 9,000; Referee: Bruch

1 September 1987 6	Eintracht Frankfurt	0–0	Borussia Dortmund	Frankfurt, West Germany
20:00 CEST		(Report)		Stadium: Waldstadion; Attendance: 19,000; Referee: Zimmermann

5 September 1987 7	Bayern Munich	3–2	Eintracht Frankfurt	Munich, West Germany
15:30 CEST	Nachtweih 44'; Augenthaler 54'; Wohlfarth 62'	(Report)	Smolarek 2'; Schulz 37'	Stadium: Olympiastadion; Attendance: 19,000; Referee: Neuner

11 September 1987 8	Eintracht Frankfurt	5–1	Waldhof Mannheim	Frankfurt, West Germany
20:00 CEST	Möller 12'; Klepper 25'; Balzis 56'; Smolarek 58'; Körbel 84'	(Report)	Bockenfeld 69'	Stadium: Waldstadion; Attendance: 14,000; Referee: Assenmacher

17 September 1987 9	FC Homburg	5–2	Eintracht Frankfurt	Homburg, West Germany
18:00 CEST	Keim 47'; Westerbeek 52'; Kruszyński 55'; Blättel 59', 67'	(Report)	Détári 43'; Smolarek 80'	Stadium: Waldstadion; Attendance: 4,500; Referee: Kautschor

26 September 1987 10	Eintracht Frankfurt	3–1	1. FC Nürnberg	Frankfurt, West Germany
15:30 CEST	Smolarek 26'; Schulz 84'; Binz 88'	(Report)	Eckstein 33'	Stadium: Waldstadion; Attendance: 20,000; Referee: Broska

3 October 1987 11	Borussia Mönchengladbach	3–1	Eintracht Frankfurt	Mönchengladbach, West Germany
15:30 CEST	Hochstätter 19'; Bakalorz 35'; Dreßen 74'	(Report)	Schulz 16'	Stadium: Bökelbergstadion; Attendance: 11,500; Referee: Matheis

10 October 1987 12	Eintracht Frankfurt	3–0	Hamburger SV	Frankfurt, West Germany
15:30 CEST	Schulz 15'; Balzis 49'; Kraaz 70'	(Report)		Stadium: Waldstadion; Attendance: 22,500; Referee: Werner

17 October 1987 13	Eintracht Frankfurt	1–1	1. FC Köln	Frankfurt, West Germany
15:30 CEST	Olsen 18' (o.g.)	(Report)	Görtz 46'	Stadium: Waldstadion; Attendance: 45,000; Referee: Kriegelstein

30 October 1987 14	Werder Bremen	2–0	Eintracht Frankfurt	Bremen, West Germany
20:00 CEST	Votava 44'; Schlindwein 45' (o.g.)	(Report)		Stadium: Weserstadion; Attendance: 18,000; Referee: Kruse

7 November 1987 15	Eintracht Frankfurt	2–0	FC Schalke 04	Frankfurt, West Germany
15:30 CEST	Möller 2'; Balzis 60'	(Report)		Stadium: Waldstadion; Attendance: 19,000; Referee: Strigel

14 November 1987 16	Hannover 96	1–2	Eintracht Frankfurt	Hanover, West Germany
15:30 CEST	Grillemeier 25' (pen.)	(Report)	Détári 17' (pen.); Smolarek 58'	Stadium: Niedersachsenstadion; Attendance: 18,000; Referee: Weber

21 November 1987 17	Eintracht Frankfurt	4–0	Karlsruher SC	Frankfurt, West Germany
15:30 CEST	Körbel 35'; Détári 35'; Schulz 76'; Smolarek 83' (pen.)	(Report)		Stadium: Waldstadion; Attendance: 16,500; Referee: Schmidhuber

28 November 1987 18	Eintracht Frankfurt	0–2	1. FC Kaiserslautern	Frankfurt, West Germany
15:30 CEST		(Report)	Hartmann 52'; Lutz 72'	Stadium: Waldstadion; Attendance: 17,000; Referee: Ahlenfelder

5 December 1987 19	VfL Bochum	1–0	Eintracht Frankfurt	Bochum, West Germany
15:30 CEST	Kempe 52'	(Report)		Stadium: Ruhrstadion; Attendance: 12,000; Referee: Osmers

20 February 1988 20	Eintracht Frankfurt	3–1	Bayer Uerdingen	Frankfurt, West Germany
15:30 CEST	Smolarek 50'; Turowski 52'; Détári 84'	(Report)	Fach 57'	Stadium: Waldstadion; Attendance: 11,000; Referee: Wiesel

5 March 1988 22	Eintracht Frankfurt	3–2	Bayer Leverkusen	Frankfurt, West Germany
15:30 CEST	Klepper 14'; Détári 25', 80'	(Report)	Falkenmayer 37'; Tita 40'	Stadium: Waldstadion; Attendance: 10,000; Referee: Tritschler

12 March 1988 23	Borussia Dortmund	3–1	Eintracht Frankfurt	Dortmund, West Germany
15:30 CEST	Helmer 46'; Hupe 78'; Mill 90'	(Report)	Schulz 35'	Stadium: Westfalenstadion; Attendance: 25,000; Referee: Barnick

15 March 1988 21	VfB Stuttgart	1–0	Eintracht Frankfurt	Stuttgart, West Germany
20:00 CEST	Schütterle 68'	(Report)		Stadium: Neckarstadion; Attendance: 18,000; Referee: Kautschor

19 March 1988 24	Eintracht Frankfurt	1–1	Bayern Munich	Frankfurt, West Germany
15:30 CEST	Turowski 71'	(Report)	Matthäus 73' (pen.)	Stadium: Waldstadion; Attendance: 51,000; Referee: Pauly

23 March 1988 25	Waldhof Mannheim	2–2	Eintracht Frankfurt	Ludwigshafen, West Germany
20:00 CEST	Roscher 72'; Lux 88'	(Report)	Turowski 31'; Détári 46'	Stadium: Südweststadion; Attendance: 8,000; Referee: Kruse

26 March 1988 26	Eintracht Frankfurt	1–2	FC Homburg	Frankfurt, West Germany
15:30 CEST	Détári 61'	(Report)	Freiler 8', 47'	Stadium: Waldstadion; Attendance: 9,000; Referee: Broska

9 April 1988 27	1. FC Nürnberg	1–1	Eintracht Frankfurt	Nuremberg, West Germany
15:30 CEST	Brunner 55'	(Report)	Smolarek 51'	Stadium: Städtisches Stadion; Attendance: 23,000; Referee: Strigel

16 April 1988 28	Eintracht Frankfurt	2–0	Borussia Mönchengladbach	Frankfurt, West Germany
15:30 CEST	Binz 33'; Turowski 69'	(Report)		Stadium: Waldstadion; Attendance: 22,000; Referee: Bruch

23 April 1988 29	Hamburger SV	2–2	Eintracht Frankfurt	Hamburg, West Germany
15:30 CEST	Kastl 12', 66'	(Report)	Schlindwein 73'; Balzis 83'	Stadium: Volksparkstadion; Attendance: 10,000; Referee: Ahlenfelder

30 April 1988 30	1. FC Köln	1–1	Eintracht Frankfurt	Cologne, West Germany
15:30 CEST	Littbarski 65'	(Report)	Détári 23'	Stadium: Müngersdorfer Stadion; Attendance: 12,000; Referee: Werner

3 May 1988 31	Eintracht Frankfurt	0–1	Werder Bremen	Frankfurt, West Germany
20:00 CEST		(Report)	Riedle 70'	Stadium: Waldstadion; Attendance: 27,000; Referee: Kautschor

7 May 1988 32	FC Schalke 04	0–0	Eintracht Frankfurt	Gelsenkirchen, West Germany
15:30 CEST		(Report)		Stadium: Parkstadion; Attendance: 12,500; Referee: Osmers

14 May 1988 33	Eintracht Frankfurt	3–3	Hannover 96	Frankfurt, West Germany
15:30 CEST	Détári 5', 84'; Friz 22'	(Report)	Reich 51', 87'; Grillemeier 69'	Stadium: Waldstadion; Attendance: 9,000; Referee: Föckler

21 May 1988 34	Karlsruher SC	1–1	Eintracht Frankfurt	Karlsruhe, West Germany
15:30 CEST	Glesius 88'	(Report)	Schulz 17'	Stadium: Wildparkstadion; Attendance: 25,000; Referee: Krug

==== League table ====
Pos	Team	Pld	W	D	L	GF	GA	GD	Pts	Qualification or relegation
7	Borussia Mönchengladbach	34	14	5	15	55	53	+2	33	
8	Bayer Leverkusen	34	10	12	12	53	60	−7	32	Qualification to UEFA Cup first round (Note: Bayer Leverkusen won the UEFA Cup and thereby automatically qualified as title holders.)
9	Eintracht Frankfurt	34	10	11	13	51	50	+1	31	Qualification to Cup Winners' Cup first round
10	Hannover 96	34	12	7	15	59	60	−1	31	
11	Bayer 05 Uerdingen	34	11	9	14	59	61	−2	31	

Source: www.dfb.de
Rules for classification: 1) points; 2) goal difference; 3) number of goals scored.

=== DFB-Pokal ===
28 August 1987 1st Round	Eintracht Frankfurt	3–2	FC Schalke 04	Frankfurt, West Germany
20:00 CEST	Möller 16'; Schulz 29'; Balzis 72'	(Report)	Thon 43', 63'	Stadium: Waldstadion; Attendance: 17,300; Referee: Mierswa

24 October 1987 2nd Round	Eintracht Frankfurt	3–0	SSV Ulm 1846	Frankfurt, West Germany
	Turowski 43', 85'; Smolarek 62'	(Report)		Stadium: Waldstadion; Attendance: 4,126; Referee: Brehm

24 November 1987 3rd Round	Fortuna Düsseldorf	0–1	Eintracht Frankfurt	Düsseldorf, West Germany
15:30 CEST		(Report)	Détári 77' (pen.)	Attendance: 6,500; Referee: Zimmermann

8 March 1988 Quarter-finals	Eintracht Frankfurt	4–2	Bayer Uerdingen	Frankfurt, West Germany
	Détári 22'; Sievers 33'; Binz 55'; Smolarek 64'	(Report)	Münn 10' (o.g.); W Funkel 39'	Stadium: Waldstadion; Attendance: 10,500; Referee: Gabor

13 April 1988 Semi-finals	Werder Bremen	0–1	Eintracht Frankfurt	Bremen, West Germany
		(Report)	Schulz 45'	Stadium: Weserstadion; Attendance: 20,000; Referee: Pauly

==== Final ====
28 May 1988
18:00 CEST

Eintracht Frankfurt	1–0	VfL Bochum
Détári 81'	Report

Olympiastadion, West Berlin
Attendance: 76,000
Referee: Wilfried Heitmann (Drentwede)

== Squad ==
=== Squad and statistics ===
No.	Pos	Nat	Player	Total		Bundesliga		DFB-Pokal	
No.	Pos	Nat	Player	Apps	Goals	Apps	Goals	Apps	Goals
	GK	(West Germany) FRG	Thomas Ernst	1	0	1	0	0	0
	GK	(West Germany) FRG	Hans-Jürgen Gundelach	16	0	14	0	2	0
	GK	(West Germany) FRG	Uli Stein	24	0	20	0	4	0
	DF	(West Germany) FRG	Manfred Binz	40	3	34	2	6	1
	DF	(West Germany) FRG	Thomas Klepper	30	2	25	2	5	0
	DF	(West Germany) FRG	Charly Körbel	39	2	33	2	6	0
	DF	(West Germany) FRG	Michael Kostner	11	0	10	0	1	0
	DF	(West Germany) FRG	Armin Kraaz	22	1	19	1	3	0
	DF	(West Germany) FRG	Volker Münn	10	0	8	0	2	0
	DF	(West Germany) FRG	Dietmar Roth	33	0	27	0	6	0
	DF	(West Germany) FRG	Dieter Schlindwein	22	1	18	1	4	0
	MF	(Hungary) HUN	Lajos Détári	39	14	33	11	6	3
	MF	(West Germany) FRG	Dirk Heitkamp	16	0	15	0	1	0
	MF	(West Germany) FRG	Andreas Möller	14	5	12	4	2	1
	MF	(West Germany) FRG	Uwe Müller	18	0	16	0	2	0
	MF	(West Germany) FRG	Frank Schulz	37	10	32	8	5	2
	MF	(West Germany) FRG	Ralf Sievers	36	1	31	0	5	1
	FW	(West Germany) FRG	Ralf Balzis	25	5	21	4	4	1
	FW	(West Germany) FRG	Holger Friz	7	1	6	1	1	0
	FW	(West Germany) FRG	Ralf Haub	6	0	5	0	1	0
	FW	(West Germany) FRG	Dieter Kitzmann	1	0	1	0	0	0
	FW	(Poland) POL	Włodzimierz Smolarek	39	11	33	9	6	2
	FW	(Poland) POL	Janusz Turowski	27	7	23	5	4	2

== Sources ==
- Matheja, Ulrich (2011). Unsere Eintracht - Eintracht Frankfurt - Die Chronik. Die Werkstatt. ISBN 978-3-89533-750-5.
