= 1988–89 Eintracht Frankfurt season =

Bundesliga season

Eintracht Frankfurt
1988–89 season
- Chairman: Matthias Ohms
- Manager: Karl-Heinz Feldkamp (sacked 13 September 1988); Timo Zahnleiter (Represented the diseased Feldkamp since 16 August 1988); Pal Csernai (signed 14 September 1988, sacked 12 December 1988); Jörg Berger (signed 2 January 1989)
- Bundesliga: 16th (relegation play-offs)
- DFB-Pokal: Second round
- European Cup Winners' Cup: Quarter-finals
- DFB-Supercup: Runners-up
- Top goalscorer: League: Jørn Andersen (7); All: Jørn Andersen and Janusz Turowski (7)
- Highest home attendance: 47,500 18 February 1989 v Bayern Munich (league)
- Lowest home attendance: 8,000 3 December 1988 v Hannover 96 (league)
- Average home league attendance: 17,971
Home colours

The 1988–89 Eintracht Frankfurt season was the 89th season in the club's football history. In 1988–89 the club played in the Bundesliga, the top tier of German football. It was the club's 26th season in the Bundesliga.

== Matches ==
=== Legend ===
Win Draw Loss Postponed

=== Friendlies ===
29 June 1988	FV Breidenbach (West Germany)	0–7	(West Germany) Eintracht Frankfurt	Breidenbach, West Germany
18:00 CEST		Report	Schulz 5'; Andersen 30'; Binz 37'; Sievers 55'; Détári 69', 88'; Haub 73'	Stadium: Stadion Gunterstal; Attendance: 3,500; Referee: Kurt Schmidt

1 July 1988	SV 45 Reinheim (West Germany)	0–15	(West Germany) Eintracht Frankfurt	Reinheim, West Germany
		Report	Andersen 18', 27', 40', 48'; Gründel 25'; Klepper 38'; Haub 49', 66'; Schulz 57', 74', 80', 85'; Balzis 68', 83'; Schlindwein 77'	Stadium: Sportzentrums Reinheim; Attendance: 1,500

3 July 1988	Dieburg XI (West Germany)	0–11	(West Germany) Eintracht Frankfurt	Dieburg, West Germany
16:00 CEST		Report	Détári 21' (pen.); Körbel 39'; Binz 40', 67'; Schlindwein 42'; Turowski 46', 81'; Sievers 47'; Schulz 50'; Haub 77'; Gründel 81'	Attendance: 1,100; Referee: Keller

5 July 1988	SG Franken 06 Sennfeld (West Germany)	0–7	(West Germany) Eintracht Frankfurt	Sennfeld, West Germany
		Report	Schulz 8', 90'; Andersen 22', 26'; Détári 42', 65'; Körbel 53'	Attendance: 1,700

7 July 1988	Trebur XI (West Germany)	0–18	(West Germany) Eintracht Frankfurt	Trebur, West Germany
18:30 CEST		Report	Détári 2', 48' (pen.), 62'; Andersen 4', 26', 34', 38'; Gründel 5'; Heitkamp 10'; Balzis 15', 71', 73', 74'; Schulz 51', 66', 80'; Turowski 76'; Heidenreich 90'	Stadium: Stadion Trebur; Attendance: 2,100; Referee: Jürgen Müller

9 July 1988	SG 01 Hoechst (West Germany)	1–5	(West Germany) Eintracht Frankfurt	Frankfurt, West Germany
	Dörr 33' (pen.)	Report	Détári 7' (pen.), 34' (pen.), 51'; Heitkamp 80'; Andersen 86'	Stadium: Stadion am Stadtpark; Attendance: 3,000; Referee: Steier

10 July 1988	Holstein Kiel (West Germany)	0–2	(West Germany) Eintracht Frankfurt	Kiel, West Germany
18:00 CEST		Report	Studer 8'; Heitkamp 37'	Stadium: Holstein-Stadion; Attendance: 5,000; Referee: Dittrich

13 July 1988	Kehdingen XI (West Germany)	1–11	(West Germany) Eintracht Frankfurt	Oederquart, West Germany
19:30 CEST	Pye 89'	Report	Andersen 2', 25', 44'; Schulz 17', 36', 48', 81'; Pistauer 46'; Balzis 65', 78'; Heitkamp 70'	Stadium: Sportplatz Oederquart; Attendance: 800

15 July 1988	FC St. Pauli (West Germany)	0–1	(West Germany) Eintracht Frankfurt	Ratekau, West Germany
		Report	Körbel 37'	Attendance: 2,200; Referee: Zimmermann

16 July 1988	Eutin 08 (West Germany)	0–6	(West Germany) Eintracht Frankfurt	West Germany
		Report	Gründel 19'; Schulz 58', 88'; Schlindwein 68'; Binz 75', 85'	Attendance: 1,000

8 August 1988	Olympiacos (Greece)	1–0	(West Germany) Eintracht Frankfurt	Athens, Greece
	Mitropoulos 28'	Report		Stadium: Olympic Stadium; Attendance: 50,000; Referee: Vutsaras

17 January 1989	Friedberg XI (West Germany)	0–18	(West Germany) Eintracht Frankfurt	Echzell, West Germany
		Report	Studer 15'; Balzis 23', 42', 44', 87'; Eckstein 37', 41'; Turowski 40', 48', 66', 86'; Gründel 45', 84'; Biernat 53'; Hobday 59'; Heidenreich 72'; Binz 75'; Bindewald 78'	Attendance: 800; Referee: Altvater

22 January 1989	Viktoria Aschaffenburg (West Germany)	0–0	(West Germany) Eintracht Frankfurt	West Germany
		Report		Attendance: 2,000; Referee: Tränk

25 January 1989	RWO Alzey (West Germany)	0–8	(West Germany) Eintracht Frankfurt	Alzey, West Germany
18:30 CEST		Report	Hobday 2'; Eckstein 6', 9' (pen.); Bakalorz 11'; Balzis 60', 68'; Turowski 66', 81'	Stadium: Wartbergstadion; Attendance: 800

31 January 1989	Louletano DC (Portugal)	0–2	(West Germany) Eintracht Frankfurt	Loule, Portugal
		Report	Bakalorz 33'; Hobday 70'	Attendance: 150; Referee: Tiago

1 February 1989	SC Olhanense (Portugal)	0–2	(West Germany) Eintracht Frankfurt	Olhão, Portugal
		Report	Gründel 35'; Hobday 75'	Attendance: 400

4 February 1989	CSKA Sofia (Bulgaria)	v	(West Germany) Eintracht Frankfurt	Portugal
Note: The scheduled fixture was cancelled since CSKA Sofia travelled home early.

11 February 1989	Eintracht Frankfurt (West Germany)	1–3	(Soviet Union) FC Dnipro	Frankfurt, West Germany
	Eckstein 66'	Report	Bahmut 35'; Idin 56'; Kabayev 84'	Stadium: Waldstadion; Attendance: 2,300

22 April 1989	CD Málaga (Spain)	0–2	(West Germany) Eintracht Frankfurt	Málaga, Spain
17:30 CEST		Report	Eckstein 18'; Klepper (red card) 83'; Körbel (red card) 83'; Turowski (red card) 83'; Bakalorz 90'	Stadium: Estadio La Rosaleda; Attendance: 2,300; Referee: López Nieto

=== Bundesliga ===
==== League fixtures and results ====
23 July 1988 1	Bayern Munich	3–0	Eintracht Frankfurt	Munich, West Germany
15:30 CEST	Augenthaler 75', 90'; Ekström 84'	Report	Stein (red card) 75'	Stadium: Olympiastadion; Attendance: 26,000; Referee: Kurt Wittke

30 July 1988 2	Eintracht Frankfurt	1–2	Stuttgarter Kickers	Frankfurt, West Germany
15:30 CEST	Balzis 83'	Report	Wolf 62'; Elser 71'	Stadium: Waldstadion; Attendance: 10,000; Referee: Hellmut Krug

13 August 1988 3	FC St. Pauli	2–0	Eintracht Frankfurt	Hamburg, West Germany
15:30 CEST	Flad 63' (pen.); Kocian 72'	Report		Stadium: Wilhelm-Koch-Stadion; Attendance: 19,000; Referee: Wolfgang Mierswa

19 August 1988 4	Eintracht Frankfurt	1–0	1. FC Köln	Frankfurt, West Germany
20:00 CEST	Turowski 45'	Report		Stadium: Waldstadion; Attendance: 15,000; Referee: Gerd Zimmermann

26 August 1988 5	Bayer Uerdingen	4–1	Eintracht Frankfurt	Krefeld, West Germany
20:00 CEST	Kuntz 18', 25'; Kleppinger 21'; W Funkel 43'	Report	Roth 73'	Stadium: Grotenburg-Stadion; Attendance: 10,000; Referee: Wolf Umbach

3 September 1988 6	Eintracht Frankfurt	1–0	1. FC Nürnberg	Frankfurt, West Germany
15:30 CEST	Bakalorz 74' (pen.)	Report		Stadium: Waldstadion; Attendance: 12,000; Referee: Dieter Pauly

10 September 1988 7	VfL Bochum	1–0	Eintracht Frankfurt	Bochum, West Germany
15:30 CEST	Heinemann 33'	Report		Stadium: Ruhrstadion; Attendance: 9,000; Referee: Manfred Harder

13 September 1988 8	Eintracht Frankfurt	0–0	SV Waldhof Mannheim	Frankfurt, West Germany
15:30 CEST		Report		Stadium: Waldstadion; Attendance: 10,000; Referee: Joachim Kautschor

8 October 1988 10	VfB Stuttgart	2–0	Eintracht Frankfurt	Stuttgart, West Germany
15:30 CEST	Allgöwer 17'; Gaudino 39'	Report		Stadium: Neckarstadion; Attendance: 19,500; Referee: Hans-Jürgen Weber

22 October 1988 11	Eintracht Frankfurt	0–1	Hamburger SV	Frankfurt, West Germany
15:30 CEST		Report	Bein 49'	Stadium: Waldstadion; Attendance: 21,000; Referee: Hans-Peter Dellwing

29 October 1988 12	1. FC Kaiserslautern	3–0	Eintracht Frankfurt	Kaiserslautern, West Germany
15:30 CEST	Hartmann 59'; Wuttke 70'; M Schulz 87'	Report	Studer (red card) 21'	Stadium: Fritz-Walter-Stadion; Attendance: 20,000; Referee: Bodo Kriegelstein

5 November 1988 13	Eintracht Frankfurt	1–1	Bayer Leverkusen	Frankfurt, West Germany
15:30 CEST	Bakalorz 43'	Report	Falkenmayer 24'	Stadium: Waldstadion; Attendance: 10,000; Referee: Markus Merk

12 November 1988 14	Borussia Mönchengladbach	2–1	Eintracht Frankfurt	Mönchengladbach, West Germany
15:30 CEST	Criens 4'; Budde 82'	Report	Binz 45'	Stadium: Bökelbergstadion; Attendance: 10,000; Referee: Gerhard Theobald

16 November 1988 9	Eintracht Frankfurt	1–0	Karlsruher SC	Frankfurt, West Germany
15:30 CEST	Schulz 36'	Report		Stadium: Waldstadion; Attendance: 18,000; Referee: Siegfried Brehm

19 November 1988 15	Eintracht Frankfurt	0–0	Werder Bremen	Frankfurt, West Germany
15:30 CEST		Report		Stadium: Waldstadion; Attendance: 16,500; Referee: Klaus Broska

26 November 1988 16	Borussia Dortmund	6–0	Eintracht Frankfurt	Dortmund, West Germany
15:30 CEST	Breitzke 3', 15', 73'; Zorc 59'; Dickel 68'; Pagelsdorf 86'	Report		Stadium: Westfalenstadion; Attendance: 22,500; Referee: Rolf Blattmann

3 December 1988 17	Eintracht Frankfurt	1–0	Hannover 96	Frankfurt, West Germany
15:30 CEST	Eckstein 47'	Report		Stadium: Waldstadion; Attendance: 8,000; Referee: Lothar Löwer

18 February 1989 18	Eintracht Frankfurt	2–2	Bayern Munich	Frankfurt, West Germany
15:30 CEST	Körbel 54'; Eckstein 70'	Report	Wegmann 46'; Thon 71'	Stadium: Waldstadion; Attendance: 47,500; Referee: Manfred Neuner

25 February 1989 19	Stuttgarter Kickers	0–1	Eintracht Frankfurt	Stuttgart, West Germany
15:30 CEST		Report	Eckstein 18'	Stadium: Neckarstadion; Attendance: 7,500; Referee: Werner Föckler

4 March 1989 20	Eintracht Frankfurt	1–1	FC St. Pauli	Frankfurt, West Germany
15:30 CEST	Bakalorz 37' (pen.)	Report	Flad 79' (pen.)	Stadium: Waldstadion; Attendance: 11,500; Referee: Hans-Jürgen Weber

11 March 1989 21	1. FC Köln	3–2	Eintracht Frankfurt	Cologne, West Germany
15:30 CEST	Povlsen 45'; Görtz 77'; Allofs 86'	Report	Andersen 60', 90'	Stadium: Müngersdorfer Stadion; Attendance: 13,000; Referee: Wilfried Heitmann

18 March 1989 22	Eintracht Frankfurt	0–2	Bayer Uerdingen	Frankfurt, West Germany
15:30 CEST		Report	Hellmann 27'; Kuntz 82'	Stadium: Waldstadion; Attendance: 10,500; Referee: Heinz Werner

25 March 1989 23	1. FC Nürnberg	1–1	Eintracht Frankfurt	Nuremberg, West Germany
15:30 CEST	Wirsching 45'	Report	Studer 78'	Stadium: Städtisches Stadion; Attendance: 22,000; Referee: Leonhard Kentsch

31 March 1989 24	Eintracht Frankfurt	1–1	VfL Bochum	Bochum, West Germany
20:00 CEST	Binz 82'	Report	Nehl 58'	Stadium: Ruhrstadion; Attendance: 10,000; Referee: Werner Föckler

8 April 1989 25	SV Waldhof Mannheim	1–0	Eintracht Frankfurt	Ludwigshafen, West Germany
15:30 CEST	Freiler 41'	Report		Stadium: Südweststadion; Attendance: 14,500; Referee: Peter Richmann

15 April 1989 26	Karlsruher SC	1–3	Eintracht Frankfurt	Karlsruhe, West Germany
15:30 CEST	Trapp 18' (pen.)	Report	Turowski 8', 17', 87'	Stadium: Wildparkstadion; Attendance: 16,000; Referee: Dieter Pauly

29 April 1989 27	Eintracht Frankfurt	1–3	VfB Stuttgart	Frankfurt, West Germany
15:30 CEST	Turowski 4'	Report	Hartmann 15'; Walter 25'; Gaudino 83'	Stadium: Waldstadion; Attendance: 26,500; Referee: Karl-Josef Assenmacher

6 May 1989 28	Hamburger SV	2–1	Eintracht Frankfurt	Hamburg, West Germany
15:30 CEST	von Heesen 38'; Bierhoff 47'	Report	Turowski 27'	Stadium: Volksparkstadion; Attendance: 9,500; Referee: Hellmut Krug

12 May 1989 29	Eintracht Frankfurt	3–2	1. FC Kaiserslautern	Frankfurt, West Germany
20:00 CEST	Eckstein 45', 62'; Körbel 84' (pen.)	Report	Wuttke 51'; Labbadia 86'	Stadium: Waldstadion; Attendance: 26,000; Referee: Manfred Harder

20 May 1989 30	Bayer Leverkusen	2–2	Eintracht Frankfurt	Leverkusen, West Germany
15:30 CEST	Rolff 37'; Buncol 61'	Report	Gründel 17'; Studer 45'	Stadium: Ulrich-Haberland-Stadion; Attendance: 8,000; Referee: Gerd Zimmermann

25 May 1989 31	Eintracht Frankfurt	1–1	Borussia Mönchengladbach	Frankfurt, West Germany
18:00 CEST	Eckstein 65'	Report	Bruns 58'	Stadium: Waldstadion; Attendance: 23,000; Referee: Aron Schmidhuber

3 June 1989 32	Werder Bremen	2–0	Eintracht Frankfurt	Bremen, West Germany
15:30 CEST	Neubarth 27'; Ordenewitz 84'	Report		Stadium: Weserstadion; Attendance: 21,500; Referee: Gerhard Theobald

10 June 1989 33	Eintracht Frankfurt	2–1	Borussia Dortmund	Frankfurt, West Germany
15:30 CEST	Turowski 1'; Schulz 67'	Report	Rummenigge 26'	Stadium: Waldstadion; Attendance: 30,000; Referee: Manfred Amerell

17 June 1989 34	Hannover 96	1–1	Eintracht Frankfurt	Hanover, West Germany
15:30 CEST	Reich 27'	Report	Körbel 68'	Stadium: Niedersachsenstadion; Attendance: 12,000; Referee: Klaus Broska

==== Relegation play-offs ====
21 June 1989 First leg	Eintracht Frankfurt	2–0	1. FC Saarbrücken	Frankfurt, West Germany
19:45 CEST	Andersen 26'; Binz 60'	Report		Stadium: Waldstadion; Attendance: 40,000; Referee: Wolf-Günther Wiesel

17 June 1989 Second leg	1. FC Saarbrücken	2–1	Eintracht Frankfurt	Saarbrücken, West Germany
20:15 CEST	Yeboah 10', 76'	Report	Schulz 51'; Lasser (red card) 90'	Stadium: Ludwigsparkstadion; Attendance: 35,000; Referee: Dieter Pauly

==== League table ====
Pos	Team	Pld	W	D	L	GF	GA	GD	Pts	Qualification or relegation
14	1. FC Nürnberg	34	8	10	16	36	54	−18	26	
15	VfL Bochum	34	9	8	17	37	57	−20	26	
16	Eintracht Frankfurt (O)	34	8	10	16	30	53	−23	26	Qualification to relegation play-offs
17	Stuttgarter Kickers (R)	34	10	6	18	41	68	−27	26	Relegation to 2. Bundesliga
18	Hannover 96 (R)	34	4	11	19	36	71	−35	19	Relegation to 2. Bundesliga

Source: www.dfb.de
Rules for classification: 1) points; 2) goal difference; 3) number of goals scored.
(O) Play-off winners; (R) Relegated

==== Results summary ====
Overall								Home						Away					
Pld	W	D	L	GF	GA	GD	Pts	W	D	L	GF	GA	GD	W	D	L	GF	GA	GD
34	8	10	16	30	53	−23	26	6	7	4	17	17	0	2	3	12	13	36	−23

Source: Bundesliga

==== Results by round ====
Round	1	2	3	4	5	6	7	8	9	10	11	12	13	14	15	16	17	18	19	20	21	22	23	24	25	26	27	28	29	30	31	32	33	34
Ground	A	H	A	H	A	H	A	H	H	A	H	A	H	A	H	A	H	H	A	H	A	H	A	H	A	A	H	A	H	A	H	A	H	A
Result	L	L	L	W	L	W	L	D	W	L	L	L	D	L	D	L	W	D	W	D	L	L	D	D	L	W	L	L	W	D	D	L	W	D
Position	18	18	18	16	18	15	16	16	15	15	17	17	17	16	16	18	15	15	15	15	15	15	15	15	16	16	16	16	16	16	16	16	16	16

A = Away; H = Home; W = Win; D = Draw; L = Loss

=== DFL-Supercup ===
20 July 1988 Final	Eintracht Frankfurt	0–2	Werder Bremen	Frankfurt
20:15 CEST (UTC+2)		Report	Riedle 24'; Burgsmüller 90'	Stadium: Waldstadion; Attendance: 20,500; Referee: Karl-Josef Assenmacher

=== DFB-Pokal ===
6 August 1988 First round	VfL Wolfsburg	1–1 (a.e.t.)	Eintracht Frankfurt	Wolfsburg, West Germany
15:30 CEST	Mosert 116'	Report	Andersen 93'	Stadium: VfL-Stadion am Elsterweg; Attendance: 5,500; Referee: Lutz Michael Fröhlich

24 September 1988 First round replay	Eintracht Frankfurt	6–1	VfL Wolfsburg	Frankfurt, West Germany
	Wilhelmi 5' (o.g.); Heitkamp 50'; Hobday 57'; Bakalorz 73' (pen.); Andersen 78'; Gründel 87'	Report	Mosert 64'	Stadium: Waldstadion; Attendance: 2,000; Referee: Wolf

12 October 1988 Second round	Bayer Uerdingen	5–4	Eintracht Frankfurt	Krefeld, West Germany
	Stickroth 47'; Kuntz 51', 64'; W Funkel 93' (pen.); Fach 100'	Report	Andersen 65', 76'; Bakalorz 66'; Hobday 98'	Stadium: Grotenburg-Stadion; Attendance: 7,000; Referee: Karl-Josef Assenmacher

=== European Cup Winners' Cup ===
6 September 1988 First round	Grasshopper Club Zürich (Switzerland)	0–0	(Germany) Eintracht Frankfurt	Basel, Switzerland
20:00 CEST		Report	Sievers (red card) 77'	Stadium: St. Jakob-Stadion; Attendance: 14,000; Referee: George Smith

4 October 1988 First round	Eintracht Frankfurt (West Germany)	1–0	(Switzerland) Grasshopper Club Zürich	Frankfurt, West Germany
20:00 CEST	Bakalorz 33'; Gründel (red card) 78'	Report	Ugras (red card) 78'	Stadium: Waldstadion; Attendance: 13,000; Referee: Dušan Krchňák

26 October 1988 Second round	Eintracht Frankfurt (West Germany)	3–1	(Turkey) Sakaryaspor	Frankfurt, West Germany
20:00 CEST	Sievers 9'; Balzis 31'; Studer 43'	Report	Pešić 84' (pen.)	Stadium: Waldstadion; Attendance: 28,000; Referee: John Spillane

9 November 1988 Second round	Sakaryaspor (Turkey)	0–3	(West Germany) Eintracht Frankfurt	Adapazarı, Turkey
		Report	Sievers 9'; Binz 35'; Schulz 66'	Stadium: Sakarya Atatürk Stadı; Attendance: 12,000; Referee: Hubert Forstinger

1 March 1989 Quarter-finals	Eintracht Frankfurt (West Germany)	0–0	(Belgium) KV Mechelen	Frankfurt, West Germany
19:00 CEST		Report		Stadium: Waldstadion; Attendance: 22,000; Referee: Bo Karlsson

15 March 1989 Quarter-finals	KV Mechelen (Belgium)	1–0	(West Germany) Eintracht Frankfurt
20:00 CEST	Wilmots 67'	Report		Attendance: 16,000; Referee: Alexey Spirin

=== Indoor soccer tournaments ===
==== Stuttgart ====
7-8 January 1989 1st Match	Eintracht Frankfurt	0–0	Borussia Mönchengladbach	Stuttgart, West Germany
		Report		Stadium: Hanns-Martin-Schleyer-Halle; Attendance: 7,000

7-8 January 1989 2nd Match	VfB Stuttgart	0–3	Eintracht Frankfurt	Stuttgart, West Germany
		Report	Goal	Stadium: Hanns-Martin-Schleyer-Halle; Attendance: 7,000

7-8 January 1989 3rd Match	Eintracht Frankfurt	1–0	FK Partizan	Stuttgart, West Germany
	Andersen	Report		Stadium: Hanns-Martin-Schleyer-Halle; Attendance: 7,000

==== Frankfurt ====
13 January 1989 1st Match	FSV Frankfurt	0–3	Eintracht Frankfurt	Frankfurt, West Germany
		Report	Eckstein; Binz	Stadium: Eissporthalle Frankfurt; Attendance: 2,800

13 January 1989 2nd Match	Eintracht Frankfurt	2–2	Rot-Weiss Frankfurt	Frankfurt, West Germany
	Goal	Report	Goal	Stadium: Eissporthalle Frankfurt; Attendance: 2,800

13 January 1989 3rd Match	Eintracht Frankfurt	1–1	1. FC Nürnberg	Frankfurt, West Germany
	Goal	Report	Goal	Stadium: Eissporthalle Frankfurt; Attendance: 2,800

14 January 1989 4th Match	Eintracht Frankfurt	2–3	VfB Stuttgart	Frankfurt, West Germany
	Goal	Report	Goal	Stadium: Eissporthalle Frankfurt; Attendance: 4,000

14 January 1989 5th Match	Eintracht Frankfurt	5–2	Viktoria Aschaffenburg	Frankfurt, West Germany
	Goal	Report	Goal	Stadium: Eissporthalle Frankfurt; Attendance: 4,000

14 January 1989 Semifinal	Eintracht Frankfurt	2–2 (a.e.t.) (4–2 p)	VfB Stuttgart	Frankfurt, West Germany
	Eckstein; Studer	Report	Schütterle; Allgöwer	Attendance: 4,000

14 January 1989 Final	Eintracht Frankfurt	2–1	Rot-Weiss Frankfurt	Frankfurt, West Germany
	Eckstein	Report	Caspary	Attendance: 4,000

==== DFB-Hallenpokal in Dortmund ====
27–28 January 1989 1st Match	Borussia Dortmund	1–1	Eintracht Frankfurt	Dortmund, West Germany
	Goal	Report	Goal	Stadium: Westfalenhallen; Attendance: 17,500

27–28 January 1989 2nd Match	Eintracht Frankfurt	4–1	Bayern Munich	Dortmund, West Germany
	Goal	Report	Goal	Stadium: Westfalenhallen; Attendance: 17,500

27–28 January 1989 3rd Match	1. FC Köln	1–3	Eintracht Frankfurt	Dortmund, West Germany
19:33 CEST	Goal	Report	Goal	Stadium: Westfalenhallen; Attendance: 17,500

27–28 January 1989 Semifinal	Eintracht Frankfurt	1–4	Werder Bremen	Dortmund, West Germany
	Bakalorz	Report	Goal	Stadium: Westfalenhallen; Attendance: 17,500

27–28 January 1989 3rd place play-off	Eintracht Frankfurt	4–4 (a.e.t.) (4–2 p)	Bayern Munich	Dortmund, West Germany
	Bakalorz; Studer; Eckstein	Report	Goal	Stadium: Westfalenhallen; Attendance: 17,500

== Squad ==
=== Squad and statistics ===
No.	Pos	Nat	Player	Total		Bundesliga		DFB- Supercup		DFB- Pokal		Relegation play-offs		European Cup Winners' Cup	
No.	Pos	Nat	Player	Apps	Goals	Apps	Goals	Apps	Goals	Apps	Goals	Apps	Goals	Apps	Goals
	GK	(West Germany) FRG	Hans-Jürgen Gundelach	1	0	1	0	0	0	0	0	0	0	0	0
	GK	(West Germany) FRG	Uli Stein	46	0	34	0	1	0	3	0	2	0	6	0
	DF	(West Germany) FRG	Manfred Binz	46	4	34	2	1	0	3	0	2	1	6	1
	DF	(West Germany) FRG	Charly Körbel	45	3	33	3	1	0	3	0	2	0	6	0
	DF	(West Germany) FRG	Björn Pistauer	2	0	2	0	0	0	0	0	0	0	0	0
	DF	(West Germany) FRG	Dietmar Rompel	5	0	3	0	0	0	0	0	0	0	2	0
	DF	(West Germany) FRG	Dietmar Roth	45	1	33	1	1	0	3	0	2	0	6	0
	DF	(West Germany) FRG	Dieter Schlindwein	20	0	14	0	1	0	2	0	1	0	2	0
	DF	(West Germany) FRG	Stefan Studer	33	3	23	2	1	0	3	0	2	0	4	1
	MF	(West Germany) FRG	Dirk Bakalorz	28	6	21	3	0	0	2	2	0	0	5	1
	MF	(Poland) POL	Jarosław Biernat	6	0	3	0	0	0	1	0	0	0	2	0
	MF	(West Germany) FRG	Uwe Bindewald	3	0	3	0	0	0	0	0	0	0	0	0
	MF	(West Germany) FRG	Heinz Gründel	32	2	25	1	1	0	1	1	2	0	3	0
	MF	(West Germany) FRG	Maximilian Heidenreich	17	0	13	0	1	0	2	0	0	0	1	0
	MF	(West Germany) FRG	Dirk Heitkamp	5	1	2	0	0	0	2	1	0	0	1	0
	MF	(England) ENG	Peter Hobday	23	2	15	0	1	0	3	2	0	0	4	0
	MF	(West Germany) FRG	Thomas Klepper	32	0	26	0	0	0	2	0	0	0	4	0
	MF	(West Germany) FRG	Michael Kostner	8	0	4	0	0	0	2	0	0	0	2	0
	MF	(West Germany) FRG	Thomas Lasser	16	0	12	0	0	0	0	0	2	0	2	0
	MF	(West Germany) FRG	Frank Schulz	23	4	18	2	1	0	0	0	2	1	2	1
	MF	(West Germany) FRG	Ralf Sievers	37	2	28	0	1	0	2	0	2	0	4	2
	FW	(Norway) NOR	Jørn Andersen	32	7	20	2	1	0	3	4	2	1	6	0
	FW	(West Germany) FRG	Ralf Balzis	19	2	14	1	1	0	0	0	1	0	3	1
	FW	(West Germany) FRG	Dieter Eckstein	27	6	25	6	0	0	0	0	2	0	0	0
	FW	(Poland) POL	Janusz Turowski	36	7	27	7	0	0	2	0	2	0	5	0

=== Transfers ===
In:

No.	Pos.	Nation	Player
—	FW	NOR	Jørn Andersen (from 1. FC Nürnberg)
—	MF	FRG	Dirk Bakalorz (from Borussia Mönchengladbach)
—	MF	POL	Jarosław Biernat (loan return from Union Solingen)
—	DF	FRG	Uwe Bindewald (from Eintracht Frankfurt Amateure)
—	FW	FRG	Dieter Eckstein (from 1. FC Nürnberg)
—	MF	FRG	Heinz Gründel (from Hamburger SV)
—	MF	FRG	Maximilian Heidenreich (loaned from Hannover 96, previously loaned to TSV 1860 Munich)
—	MF	ENG	Peter Hobday (from Hannover 96)
—	MF	FRG	Thomas Lasser (from Eintracht Frankfurt Amateure)
—	DF	FRG	Björn Pistauer (from Eintracht Frankfurt Amateure)
—	DF	FRG	Dietmar Rompel (from Kickers Offenbach)
—	MF	FRG	Stefan Studer (from FC St. Pauli)

Out:

No.	Pos.	Nation	Player
—	MF	HUN	Lajos Détári (to Olympiacos)
—	GK	FRG	Thomas Ernst (to Eintracht Frankfurt Amateure)
—	FW	FRG	Holger Friz (to Viktoria Aschaffenburg)
—	FW	FRG	Ralf Haub (to Viktoria Aschaffenburg)
—	DF	FRG	Armin Kraaz (to Rot-Weiss Frankfurt)
—	MF	FRG	Uwe Müller (to FC Admira Wacker)
—	DF	FRG	Volker Münn (to VfL Marburg)
—	FW	POL	Włodzimierz Smolarek (to Feyenoord)
—	DF	FRG	Klaus Theiss (to Viktoria Aschaffenburg)

== Sources ==
- Matheja, Ulrich (2011). Unsere Eintracht - Eintracht Frankfurt - Die Chronik. Die Werkstatt. ISBN 978-3-89533-750-5.
