= 1988 DFB-Pokal final =

- Match programme cover
- Event: 1987–88 DFB-Pokal
| Eintracht Frankfurt | VfL Bochum |
| 1 | 0 |
- Date: 28 May 1988
- Venue: Olympiastadion, West Berlin
- Referee: Wilfried Heitmann (Drentwede)
- Attendance: 76,000

The 1988 DFB-Pokal final decided the winner of the 1987–88 DFB-Pokal, the 45th season of Germany's premier football cup. It was played on 28 May 1988 at the Olympiastadion in West Berlin.

Eintracht Frankfurt defeated VfL Bochum 1–0 to claim the trophy for the fourth time, also qualifying for the 1988–89 European Cup Winners' Cup and the 1988 DFB-Supercup.

== Route to the final ==
| Eintracht Frankfurt | | Round | VfL Bochum |
|---|---|---|---|---|
| Opponent | Result | 1987–88 DFB-Pokal | Opponent | Result |
| FC Schalke 04 | 3–2 | Round 1 | VfB Oldenburg | 0–0 (a.e.t.) and 4–1 (replay) |
| SSV Ulm 1846 | 3–0 | Round 2 | TSG Giengen | 2–1 (a.e.t.) |
| Fortuna Düsseldorf | 1–0 | Round 3 | Schwarz-Weiß Essen | 1–0 |
| Bayer 05 Uerdingen | 4–2 | Quarterfinals | SC Fortuna Köln | 4–1 |
| SV Werder Bremen | 1–0 | Semifinals | Hamburger SV | 2–0 |

== Match ==
=== Details ===
28 May 1988
18:00 CEST

| Eintracht Frankfurt | 1–0 | VfL Bochum |
|---|---|---|
| Détári 81' | Report |

Olympiastadion, West Berlin
Attendance: 76,000
Referee: Wilfried Heitmann (Drentwede)

| Eintracht Frankfurt | VfL Bochum |

| GK | 1 | (West Germany) Uli Stein |
| SW | 4 | (West Germany) Manfred Binz |
| CB | 2 | (West Germany) Dieter Schlindwein |
| CB | 3 | (West Germany) Charly Körbel (c) |
| RM | 6 | (West Germany) Michael Kostner | Booked | (substituted off) 71' |
| CM | 5 | (West Germany) Ralf Sievers | Booked |
| CM | 7 | (West Germany) Frank Schulz |
| CM | 10 | (Hungary) Lajos Détári |
| LM | 8 | (West Germany) Dietmar Roth |
| CF | 9 | (West Germany) Holger Friz | | (substituted off) 78' |
| CF | 11 | (Poland) Włodzimierz Smolarek |
Substitutes:
| DF | | (West Germany) Thomas Klepper | | (substituted in) 71' |
| FW | | (Poland) Janusz Turowski | | (substituted in) 78' |
Manager:
(West Germany) Karl-Heinz Feldkamp

| GK | 1 | (West Germany) Ralf Zumdick |
| SW | 4 | (West Germany) Lothar Woelk (c) |
| CB | 5 | (West Germany) Walter Oswald |
| CB | 2 | (West Germany) Frank Heinemann |
| CB | 3 | (West Germany) Martin Kree | Booked |
| RM | 11 | (West Germany) Michael Rzehaczek |
| CM | 10 | (West Germany) Josef Nehl | | (substituted off) 66' |
| CM | 7 | (Poland) Andrzej Iwan |
| CM | 6 | (Netherlands) Rob Reekers |
| LM | 8 | (West Germany) Thorsten Legat | Booked |
| CF | 9 | (West Germany) Uwe Leifeld |
Substitutes:
| FW | | (West Germany) Thomas Epp | | (substituted in) 66' |
Manager:
(West Germany) Hermann Gerland

Match rules

- 90 minutes.
- 30 minutes of extra time if necessary.
- Penalty shoot-out if scores still level.
- Maximum of two substitutions.
