= 1987–88 DFB-Pokal =

Tournament details
- Country: West Germany
- Teams: 64

Final positions
- Champions: Eintracht Frankfurt
- Runners-up: VfL Bochum

Tournament statistics
- Matches played: 72
- Goals scored: 249 (3.46 per match)
- Top goal scorer: Stefan Kuntz (5)

The 1987–88 DFB-Pokal was the 45th season of the annual German football cup competition. It began on 28 August 1987 and ended on 28 May 1988. Eintracht Frankfurt defeated VfL Bochum 1–0 thereby winning the trophy for the fourth time.

== Matches ==
=== First round ===
28 August 1987

SV Südwest Ludwigshafen	1–6	SC Fortuna Köln
Hielscher 54' (o.g.)	report (in German)	Fuchs 9', 40'; Baffoe 24', 52'; Gede 70', 76' (pen.)

Attendance: 200
Referee: Berthold Schneider (Püttlingen)

28 August 1987

FC St. Pauli	0–3 (a.e.t.)	Blau-Weiß 90 Berlin
	report (in German)	Dinauer 110'; Hellmann 112', 119'

Millerntor-Stadion, Hamburg
Attendance: 5.500
Referee: Bernd Kruse (Beckum)

28 August 1987

1. FC Pforzheim	3–2	1. FC Saarbrücken
Walz 12'; Pfirrmann 25'; Steiner 57' (o.g.)	report (in German)	Hintermaier 2'; Dum 50'

Holzhof Stadion, Pforzheim
Attendance: 5.000
Referee: Stocker (Freiburg)

28 August 1987

TSV Verden	0–4	SV Werder Bremen
	report (in German)	Meier 34', 77'; Neubarth 60'; Ordenewitz 72'

Attendance: 12.000
Referee: Michael Malbranc (Hamburg)

28 August 1987

Eintracht Frankfurt	3–2	FC Schalke 04
Möller 16'; Schulz 29'; Balzis 72'	report (in German)	Thon 43', 63'

Waldstadion, Frankfurt
Attendance: 18.000
Referee: Wolfgang Mierswa (Hennigsen)

28 August 1987

VfB Oldenburg	0–0 (a.e.t.)	VfL Bochum
	report (in German)

Marschweg-Stadion, Oldenburg
Attendance: 8.200
Referee: Peter Mölm (Bremerhaven)

28 August 1987

VfL Wolfsburg	3–0	Hannover 96
Plagge 11' (pen.); Kretzschmar 46'; Fiebich 81'	report (in German)

Attendance: 7.200
Referee: Bodo Kriegelstein (Berlin)

28 August 1987

1. FC Kaiserslautern	3–1 (a.e.t.)	SV Waldhof Mannheim
Wolf 81'; Emmerling 97'; Wuttke 119'	report (in German)	Dais 23'

Betzenberg, Kaiserslautern
Attendance: 15.600
Referee: Dieter Pauly (Rheydt)

28 August 1987

Hamburger SV	3–0	FC 08 Homburg
Kaltz 15' (pen.); Gründel 34'; Kastl 73'	report (in German)

Attendance: 4.500
Referee: Rainer Boos (Kronberg)

28 August 1987

Borussia Mönchengladbach	2–1 (a.e.t.)	Bayer 04 Leverkusen
Frontzeck 55'; Rahn 112'	report (in German)	Falkenmayer 61'

Attendance: 12.000
Referee: Hans-Joachim Osmers (Bremen)

28 August 1987

1. FC Köln	3–0	VfB Stuttgart
Littbarski 27', 37'; Engels 90'	report (in German)

Radrennbahn Müngersdorf, Köln
Attendance: 30.000
Referee: Peter Gabor (Berlin)

28 August 1987

Rot-Weiss Essen	1–3	FC Bayern Munich
Regenbogen 54'	report (in German)	Wohlfarth 37', 54', 77'

Georg-Melches-Stadion, Essen
Attendance: 3.000
Referee: Hans-Heinrich Barnick (Schenfeld)

28 August 1987

VfR Aachen-Forst	0–5	Karlsruher SC
	report (in German)	Süss 10'; Bogdan 34'; Glesius 62'; Biewendt 79' (o.g.); Heisig 90'

Attendance: 2.000
Referee: Leonhard Kentsch (Essen)

28 August 1987

SV Heidingsfeld	1–2	Bayer 05 Uerdingen
Winkler 37'	report (in German)	Kuntz 62'; Herget 87'

Attendance: 6.000
Referee: Peter Corell (Heilbronn)

28 August 1987

Arminia Bielefeld	1–4 (a.e.t.)	SC Freiburg
Westerwinter 57'	report (in German)	Löffler 85'; Sané 98'; Higl 106'; Schaub 109' (pen.)

Alm, Bielefeld
Attendance: 1.500
Referee: Hans-Jürgen Weber (Essen)

28 August 1987

TuS Paderborn-Neuhaus	0–5	Stuttgarter Kickers
	report (in German)	Hein 15'; Grabosch 33'; Vollmer 57', 73'; Schlotterbeck 81'

Attendance: 4.200
Referee: Junk

28 August 1987

RSV Würges	0–3	Fortuna Düsseldorf
	report (in German)	Thomas 34', 88'; Weikl 81' (pen.)

Attendance: 4.000
Referee: Edgar Steinborn (Sinzig)

28 August 1987

TSV Vestenbergsgreuth	0–4	SV Darmstadt 98
	report (in German)	Dörr 5'; Trunk 52', 89'; Emig 60'

Attendance: 5.000
Referee: Kurt Witke (Mönchzell)

28 August 1987

SV St. Ingbert	0–2	Union Solingen
	report (in German)	Basten 20'; Römer 68'

Attendance: 1.300
Referee: Alfons Berg (Konz)

28 August 1987

Viktoria Aschaffenburg	4–0	SG Wattenscheid 09
Aulbach 4'; Schäfer 40', 46'; Lindenau 73'	report (in German)

Stadion am Schönbusch, Aschaffenburg
Attendance: 5.000
Referee: Siegbert Rubel (Neukenroth)

28 August 1987

VfR Aalen	1–2	Alemannia Aachen
Zeller 79'	report (in German)	Gries 20', 82'

Attendance: 1.900
Referee: Karl Gangkofer (Eggenfelden)

28 August 1987

FSV Salmrohr	2–0	VfL Osnabrück
Rolshausen 36'; Irmisch 82'	report (in German)

Salmtalstadion, Salmrohr
Attendance: 1.000
Referee: Paulus (Primstal)

28 August 1987

VfL Hamm	2–7	KSV Hessen Kassel
Wilhelm 63'; Becher 90'	report (in German)	Drube 3'; Th. Schmidt 30'; Knauf 39'; Hecking 45' (pen.), 57', 69'; Scott 84'

Attendance: 1.300
Referee: Kreutz

28 August 1987

VfB Dillingen	0–1	TSG Giengen
	report (in German)	G. Tekale 67'

Attendance: 1.000
Referee: Peter Thul (Leiwen)

28 August 1987

SV Werder Bremen II	5–1	MTV Ingolstadt
Spannuth 14', 85'; Krampe 23'; Hanses 56'; Rose 68'	report (in German)	Andresen 17'

Attendance: 300
Referee: Lüttig (Hamburg)

28 August 1987

Eintracht Braunschweig	2–3	1. FC Nürnberg
Posipal 44'; Buchheister 85'	report (in German)	Eckstein 20'; Schneider 33'; Dittwar 59'

Stadion an der Hamburger Straße, Braunschweig
Attendance: 13.500
Referee: Lothar Löwer (Unna)

28 August 1987

KSV Baunatal	1–1 (a.e.t.)	SSV Ulm 1846
Lindemann 90'	report (in German)	Glückler 80'

Attendance: 1.000
Referee: Harald Feistner (Einbeck)

28 August 1987

FV Offenburg	3–3 (a.e.t.)	Borussia Dortmund
Ritter 35'; Wagner 60', 115'	report (in German)	Răducanu 34'; Banach 49'; Anderbrügge 105'

Attendance: 7.000
Referee: Schäfer (Rohrhof)

28 August 1987

VfB Lübeck	1–2	Schwarz-Weiß Essen
Jeschke 89'	report (in German)	Wirbitzky 22'; Sassen 72'

Lohmühle, Lübeck
Attendance: 3.500
Referee: Wolfgang Engelmann (Hamburg)

28 August 1987

SC Concordia Hamburg	3–0 (a.e.t.)	SpVgg Erkenschwick
Witte 101'; Malek 103'; Petersen 109'	report (in German)

Marienthal-Stadion, Hamburg
Attendance: 800
Referee: Augar (Berlin)

28 August 1987

SC Preußen Münster	1–1 (a.e.t.)	Rot-Weiß Oberhausen
Riemann 63'	report (in German)	Gorka 17'

Preußenstadion, Münster
Attendance: 4.500
Referee: Peter Richmann (Leverkusen)

30 August 1987

Viktoria Köln	1–3	Hertha BSC
Herren 66'	report (in German)	Dietrich 2'; Vogler 37', 63' (pen.)

Südstadion, Köln
Attendance: 2.000
Referee: Blütgen (Gelsenkirchen)

==== Replays ====
15 September 1987

SSV Ulm 1846	2–1	KSV Baunatal
Patzer 16' (o.g.); Böpple 79'	report (in German)	Dounogher 22'

Donaustadion, Ulm
Attendance: 800
Referee: Winfried Buchhart (Schrobenhausen)

6 October 1987

Borussia Dortmund	5–0	FV Offenburg
Dickel 8'; Mill 46', 81'; Lusch 54'; Pagelsdorf 87'	report (in German)

Westfalenstadion, Dortmund
Attendance: 5.600
Referee: Wolf-Dieter Ahlenfelder (Oberhausen)

6 October 1987

Rot-Weiß Oberhausen	0–2	SC Preußen Münster
	report (in German)	Riemann 20'; Koop 70'

Niederrheinstadion, Oberhausen
Attendance: 1.200
Referee: Peter Steffens (Herzogenrath)

13 October 1987

VfL Bochum	4–1	VfB Oldenburg
Woelk 27', 69' (pen.); Nehl 57'; Fischer 83'	report (in German)	Voigt 90'

Ruhrstadion, Bochum
Attendance: 2.600
Referee: Michael Prengel (Düsseldorf)

=== Second round ===
23 October 1987

1. FC Kaiserslautern	4–3	Blau-Weiß 90 Berlin
Kohr 9'; Hartmann 19'; Allievi 65', 88'	report (in German)	Schlumberger 20'; Holzer 79'; Dinauer 83'

Betzenberg, Kaiserslautern
Attendance: 9.700
Referee: Hans-Peter Dellwing (Trier)

23 October 1987

SV Werder Bremen II	1–3	Hamburger SV
Eilts 73'	report (in German)	Kaltz 43'; Dittmer 62'; Labbadia 68'

Attendance: 4.200
Referee: Zimmermann (Kiel)

23 October 1987

SC Preußen Münster	2–2 (a.e.t.)	Alemannia Aachen
Fleige 42'; Knauer 86'	report (in German)	Zimmermann 25'; Abdelli 31'

Preußenstadion, Münster
Attendance: 12.000
Referee: Heimann (Krefeld)

23 October 1987

TSG Giengen	1–2 (a.e.t.)	VfL Bochum
Gentner 84'	report (in German)	Fischer 33'; Hantzidis 112'

Attendance: 3.300
Referee: Holger Dehmelt (Sabachwalden)

23 October 1987

1. FC Pforzheim	2–0	SC Concordia Hamburg
Moutas 78', 88' (pen.)	report (in German)

Attendance: 4.800
Referee: Bauer (Ulm)

23 October 1987

Viktoria Aschaffenburg	1–0	1. FC Köln
Höfer 83'	report (in German)

Stadion am Schönbusch, Aschaffenburg
Attendance: 12.000
Referee: Hans Fux (Stutensee)

23 October 1987

Eintracht Frankfurt	3–0	SSV Ulm 1846
Turowski 43', 64'; Smolarek 62'	report (in German)

Waldstadion, Frankfurt
Attendance: 4.100
Referee: Siegfried Brehm (Kemmern)

23 October 1987

KSV Hessen Kassel	3–1	Stuttgarter Kickers
Sippel 25', 48', 76'	report (in German)	Vollmer 54'

Auestadion, Kassel
Attendance: 3.000
Referee: Manfred Führer (Steinhagen)

23 October 1987

Karlsruher SC	1–1 (a.e.t.)	1. FC Nürnberg
Glesius 74'	report (in German)	Eckstein 65'

Wildparkstadion, Karlsruhe
Attendance: 15.000
Referee: Anton Matheis (Rodalben)

23 October 1987

SC Fortuna Köln	1–0	SC Freiburg
Außem 74'	report (in German)

Attendance: 800
Referee: Hans-Jürgen Kasper (Katlenburg)

23 October 1987

SG Union Solingen	1–2	Fortuna Düsseldorf
Römer 73' (pen.)	report (in German)	Fach 54'; Demandt 89' (pen.)

Stadion am Hermann-Löhns-Weg, Solingen
Attendance: 7.000
Referee: Karl-Josef Assenmacher (Fischenich)

23 October 1987

FSV Salmrohr	0–1	Borussia Dortmund
	report (in German)	MacLeod 26'

Salmtalstadion, Salmrohr
Attendance: 3.500
Referee: Markus Merk (Kaiserslautern)

23 October 1987

Schwarz-Weiß Essen	1–0	SV Darmstadt 98
Müffler 41'	report (in German)

Uhlenkrugstadion, Essen
Attendance: 5.500
Referee: Frorath (Köln)

23 October 1987

Borussia Mönchengladbach	2–2 (a.e.t.)	FC Bayern Munich
Hochstätter 78'; Thiele 100'	report (in German)	Rummenigge 72'; Dorfner 97'

Attendance: 34.000
Referee: Gerhard Theobald (Neunkirchen)

24 October 1987
14:30

Hertha BSC	1–2	Bayer 05 Uerdingen
Rinke 90'	report (in German)	Kuntz 39', 56'

Olympiastadion, Berlin
Attendance: 5.600
Referee: Manfred Harder (Lüneburg)

21 November 1987

VfL Wolfsburg	4–5 (a.e.t.)	SV Werder Bremen
Plagge 79' (pen.); Ansorge 89'; Otto 90'; Fiebich 90'	report (in German)	Neubarth 40'; Ansorge 53' (o.g.); Kutzop 70' (pen.); Riedle 84'; Ordenewitz 101'

Attendance: 10.000
Referee: Schmidt (Bad Hersfeld)

==== Replays ====
11 November 1987

Alemannia Aachen	0–1	SC Preußen Münster
	report (in German)	Buschlinger 28' (o.g.)

Tivoli, Aachen
Attendance: 2.000
Referee: Wolf-Rüdiger Umbach (Rottdorf)

11 November 1987

1. FC Nürnberg	2–1	Karlsruher SC
Eckstein 46'; Philipkowski 50'	report (in German)	Bogdan 73'

Attendance: 7.400
Referee: Joachim Kautschor (Eschweiler)

11 November 1987

FC Bayern Munich	3–2 (a.e.t.)	Borussia Mönchengladbach
Matthäus 74'; Rummenigge 93', 111'	report (in German)	Thiele 57'; Criens 110'

Olympiastadion, Munich
Attendance: 42.000
Referee: Heinz Werner (Auersmacher)

=== Round of 16 ===
24 November 1987

Fortuna Düsseldorf	0–1	Eintracht Frankfurt
	report (in German)	Détári 77' (pen.)

Rheinstadion, Düsseldorf
Attendance: 6.500
Referee: Zimmermann (Kiel)

10 December 1987

SC Preußen Münster	2–3	SC Fortuna Köln
Koop 47'; Gäher 79'	report (in German)	Baffoe 18'; Schlösser 32'; Niggemann 70'

Preußenstadion, Münster
Attendance: 22.000
Referee: Friedrich Retzmann (Pinneberg)

13 February 1988

Bayer 05 Uerdingen	3–3 (a.e.t.)	Borussia Dortmund
Fach 46'; Witeczek 77'; Kuntz 96'	report (in German)	Helmer 31'; Hupe 87'; Kutowski 119'

Grotenburg Stadion, Krefeld
Attendance: 13.000
Referee: Karl-Josef Assenmacher (Fischenich)

13 February 1988

1. FC Pforzheim	1–1 (a.e.t.)	SV Werder Bremen
Pfirrmann 69'	report (in German)	Bratseth 7'

Holzhof Stadion, Pforzheim
Attendance: 11.500
Referee: Karl-Heinz Tritschler (Freiburg)

13 February 1988

KSV Hessen Kassel	0–1	Viktoria Aschaffenburg
	report (in German)	Höfer 66'

Auestadion, Kassel
Attendance: 8.000
Referee: Karl-Heinz Gochermann (Bochum)

13 February 1988

1. FC Kaiserslautern	1–2	Hamburger SV
Moser 66'	report (in German)	Jakobs 41'; Okoński 76' (pen.)

Attendance: 28.000
Referee: Aron Schmidhuber (Ottobrunn)

14 February 1988

FC Bayern Munich	3–1	1. FC Nürnberg
Nachtweih 20'; Hughes 62'; Matthäus 90' (pen.)	report (in German)	Andersen 33'

Olympiastadion, Munich
Attendance: 61.000
Referee: Wolf-Rüdiger Umbach (Rottdorf)

14 February 1988

Schwarz-Weiss Essen	0–1	VfL Bochum
	report (in German)	Leifeld 57'

Uhlenkrugstadion, Essen
Attendance: 15.000
Referee: Edgar Steinborn (Sinzig)

==== Replays ====
24 February 1988

Borussia Dortmund	1–2	Bayer 05 Uerdingen
Dickel 50'	report (in German)	W. Funkel 21'; Kuntz 72'

Westfalenstadion, Dortmund
Attendance: 12.000
Referee: Wilfried Heitmann (Drentwede)

24 February 1988

SV Werder Bremen	3–1	1. FC Pforzheim
Neubarth 19'; Ordenewitz 37'; Riedle 43'	report (in German)	Mähler 30'

Weserstadion, Bremen
Attendance: 5.000
Referee: Hellmut Krug (Gelsenkirchen)

=== Quarter-finals ===
8 March 1988

Hamburger SV	2–1	FC Bayern Munich
Kastl 6'; Gründel 45'	report (in German)	Matthäus 59'

Attendance: 45.000
Referee: Werner Föckler (Bad Dürkheim)

8 March 1988

Eintracht Frankfurt	4–2	Bayer 05 Uerdingen
Détári 22'; Sievers 33'; Binz 55'; Smolarek 64'	report (in German)	Münn 10' (o.g.); W. Funkel 39'

Waldstadion, Frankfurt
Attendance: 10.300
Referee: Peter Gabor (Berlin)

9 March 1988

Viktoria Aschaffenburg	1–3	SV Werder Bremen
Lindenau 87'	report (in German)	Neubarth 7'; Votava 31'; Schaaf 55'

Stadion am Schönbusch, Aschaffenburg
Attendance: 13.000
Referee: Hans-Jürgen Weber (Essen)

9 March 1988

VfL Bochum	4–1	SC Fortuna Köln
Leifeld 70', 83'; Iwan 87'; Epp 88'	report (in German)	Pförtner 29'

Ruhrstadion, Bochum
Attendance: 5.000
Referee: Eugen Strigel (Horb)

=== Semi-finals ===
12 April 1988

VfL Bochum	2–0	Hamburger SV
Kree 27'; Iwan 60'	report (in German)

Ruhrstadion, Bochum
Attendance: 31.000
Referee: Hans Scheuerer (Munich)

13 April 1988

SV Werder Bremen	0–1	Eintracht Frankfurt
	report (in German)	Schulz 45'

Weserstadion, Bremen
Attendance: 20.000
Referee: Dieter Pauly (Rheydt)

=== Final ===
28 May 1988
18:00 CEST

Eintracht Frankfurt	1–0	VfL Bochum
Détári 81'	Report

Olympiastadion, West Berlin
Attendance: 76,000
Referee: Wilfried Heitmann (Drentwede)
