= Peter Hobday =

Peter Hobday may refer to:

- Peter Hobday (footballer) (born 1961), English footballer
- Peter Hobday (presenter) (1937–2020), British presenter
