= 1986–87 SV Werder Bremen season =

SV Werder Bremen
1986-87 season
- Manager: Otto Rehhagel
- Stadium: Weserstadion
- Bundesliga: 5th
- DFB-Pokal: First round
- UEFA Cup: First round
- Top goalscorer: League: Rudi Völler (22 goals); All: Rudi Völler (22 goals)

In the 1986–87 season, Werder Bremen reached third place in the Bundesliga, ending the season with 40 points.

It was the club's sixth consecutive season in the Bundesliga after their promotion in the 1980-81 2. Bundesliga. After the end of the season, sweeper Bruno Pezzey and striker Rudi Völler left for Swarovski Tirol and AS Roma respectively.

== Squad ==
Note: Flags indicate national team as defined under FIFA eligibility rules; some limited exceptions apply. Players may hold more than one non-FIFA nationality.

| No. | Pos. | Nation | Player |
|---|---|---|---|
| — | GK | GER | Dieter Burdenski |
| — | DF | NOR | Rune Bratseth |
| — | DF | GER | Michael Kutzop |
| — | DF | GER | Axel Noruschat |
| — | DF | GER | Jonny Otten |
| — | DF | AUT | Bruno Pezzey |
| — | DF | GER | Gunnar Sauer |
| — | DF | GER | Thomas Schaaf |
| — | DF | GER | Dieter Schlindwein |
| — | DF | GER | Thomas Wolter |
| — | MF | GER | Dieter Eilts |
| — | MF | GER | Christoph Hanses |
| — | MF | GER | Günter Hermann |
| — | MF | GER | Norbert Meier |
| — | MF | GER | Benno Möhlmann |
| — | MF | GER | Miroslav Votava |

| No. | Pos. | Nation | Player |
|---|---|---|---|
| — | FW | GER | Manfred Burgsmüller |
| — | FW | GER | Frank Neubarth |
| — | FW | GER | Frank Ordenewitz |
| — | FW | GER | Rudi Völler |

=== Bundesliga ===
==== League table ====
| Pos | Team | Pld | W | D | L | GF | GA | GD | Pts | Qualification or relegation |
|---|---|---|---|---|---|---|---|---|---|---|
| 3 | Borussia Mönchengladbach | 34 | 18 | 7 | 9 | 74 | 44 | +30 | 43 | Qualification to UEFA Cup first round (Note: As Hamburger SV qualified for the Cup Winners' Cup, their UEFA Cup spot was transferred to Leverkusen.) |
| 4 | Borussia Dortmund | 34 | 15 | 10 | 9 | 70 | 50 | +20 | 40 | Qualification to UEFA Cup first round |
| 5 | Werder Bremen | 34 | 17 | 6 | 11 | 65 | 54 | +11 | 40 | Qualification to UEFA Cup first round |
| 6 | Bayer Leverkusen | 34 | 16 | 7 | 11 | 56 | 38 | +18 | 39 | Qualification to UEFA Cup first round |
| 7 | 1. FC Kaiserslautern | 34 | 15 | 7 | 12 | 64 | 51 | +13 | 37 | |

Source: www.dfb.de
Rules for classification: 1) points; 2) goal difference; 3) number of goals scored.

==== Matches ====
| 1 | v |

| 2 | v |

| 3 | v |

| 4 | v |

| 5 | v |

| 6 | v |

| 7 | v |

| 8 | v |

| 9 | v |

| 10 | v |

| 11 | v |

| 12 | v |

| 13 | v |

| 14 | v |

| 15 | v |

| 16 | v |

| 17 | v |

| 18 | v |

| 19 | v |

| 20 | v |

| 21 | v |

| 22 | v |

| 23 | v |

| 24 | v |

| 25 | v |

| 26 | v |

| 27 | v |

| 28 | v |

| 29 | v |

| 30 | v |

| 31 | v |

| 32 | v |

| 33 | v |

| 34 | v |
