= Festhalle =

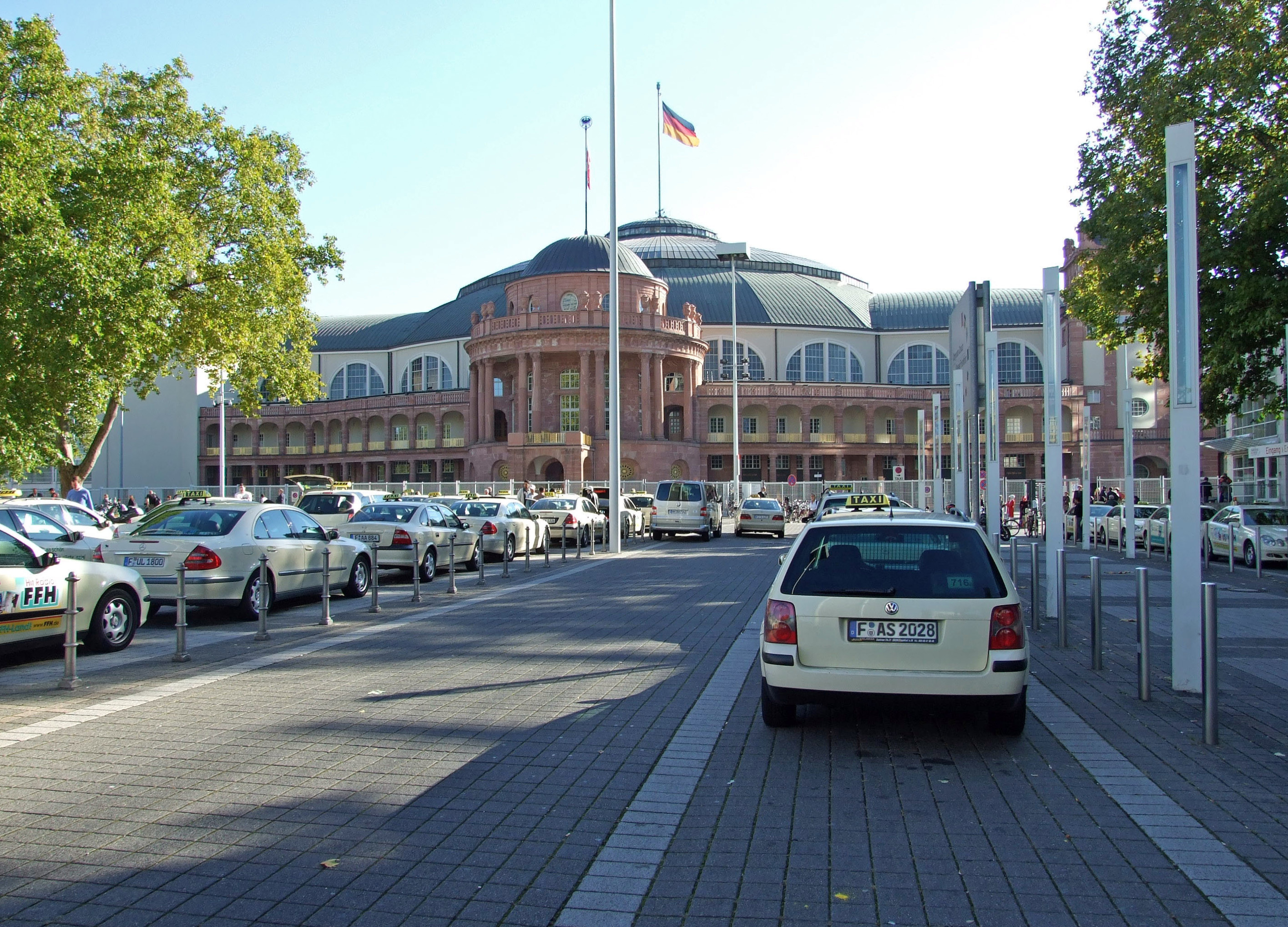
The Festhalle Frankfurt

A Festhalle (German pronunciation: [ˈfɛst.halə]; plural, Festhallen [ˈfɛst.halən]) is a German arena or community center. The literal meaning of the name "Festhalle" literally means "Feast-Hall," but is best translated as "Festival Hall" or "Civic Center." Festhallen can be found in many towns and cities in Germany, and range in size and use from small neighborhood activity centers, to large capacity stadiums able to seat thousands of spectators. Some of the best known Festhallen in Germany are as follows:

- Berlin
  - The Festhalle Plauen
  - Seating ~ 4,820
- Stuttgart
  - Festhalle Stuttgart-Feuerbach
  - Seating ~ 18,000
- Dresden
  - Arena Dresden
  - Seating ~ 13,000
- Frankfurt
  - Festhalle Frankfurt
  - Seating ~ 15,179
- Munich
  - The Löwenbräu-Festhalle
  - Seating ~ 5,700
