= Robert Holzer =

German footballer (born 1966)

Personal information
- Date of birth: 2 August 1966 (age 60)
- Place of birth: Berlin, West Germany
- Height: 1.77 m (5 ft 10 in)
- Position: Defender

Senior career*
Years	Team	Apps	(Gls)
1987–1989	Blau-Weiß Berlin	82	(12)
1990–1991	Hertha BSC	41	(1)
1991–1992	Bayer Uerdingen	14	(0)
1992–1993	SC Fortuna Köln	11	(1)
- * Club domestic league appearances and goals

Robert Holzer (born 2 August 1966) is a retired German football player. He is currently a player agent.
