= Uhlenkrugstadion =

Football stadium in Essen, Germany

Coordinates: 51°25′36″N 7°01′06″E

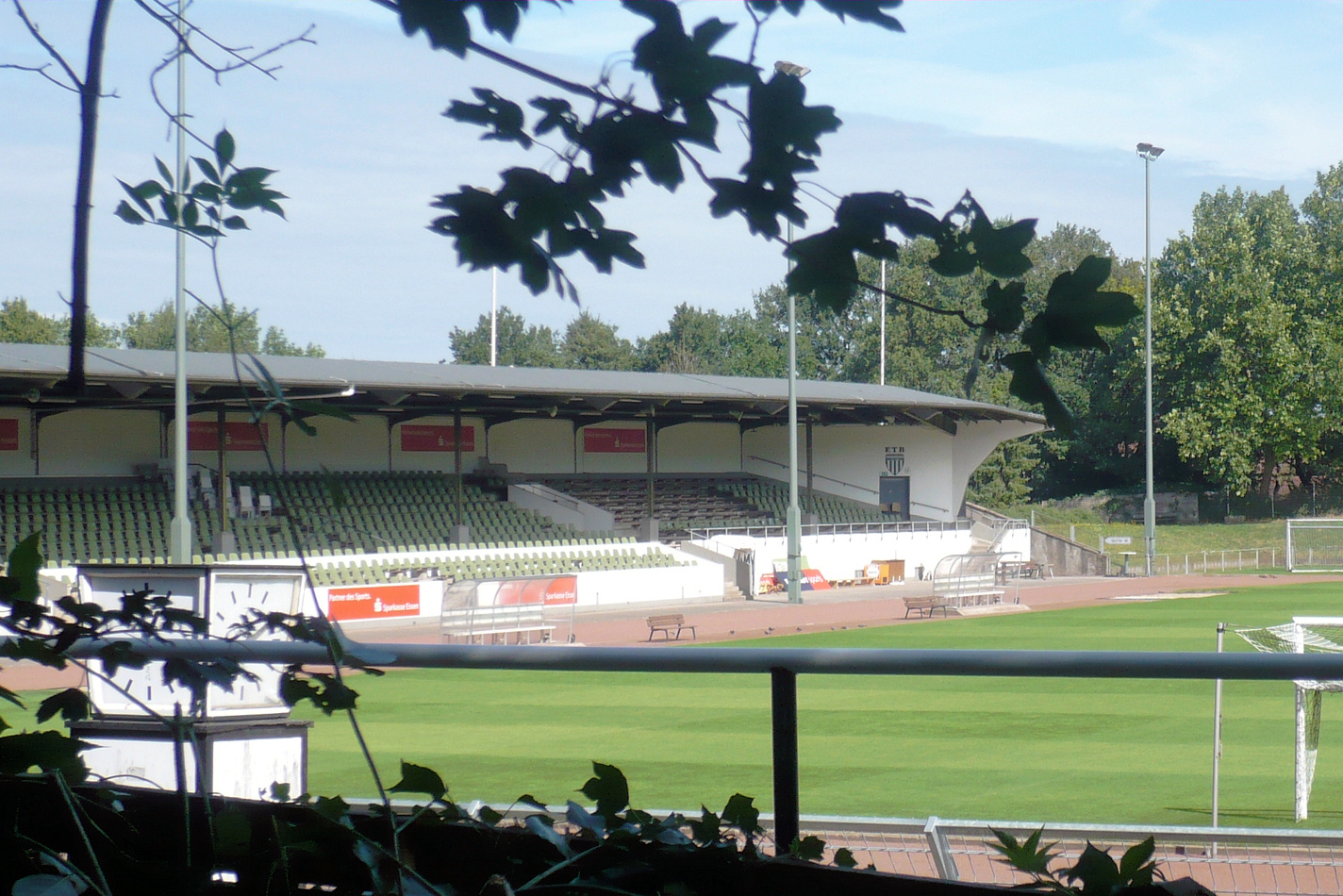
Uhlenkrugstadion

Uhlenkrugstadion is a multi-use stadium in Essen, Germany. It is currently used mostly for football matches and serves as home ground for Schwarz-Weiß Essen.

The stadium was built by its main tenant in 1922, having an initial capacity of 35,000 people and featuring a stand constructed out of iron, which was unusual at this time. In 1939, the structure was expanded to hold 45,000 people. After World War II, during which the stadium was destroyed, it hosted an international friendly between West Germany and Luxembourg in 1951. Over the years and because of increasing structural decline and safety measures, the capacity was gradually reduced to about 20,000 people, before undergoing further reconstruction work in order to meet the criteria for the newly founded NRW-Liga. The stadium currently has a capacity of 9,950 people.
