= Primštal =

- Location in Slovenia
- Coordinates: 45°55′3.58″N 15°2′5.28″E
- Country: Slovenia
- Traditional region: Lower Carniola
- Statistical region: Southeast Slovenia
- Municipality: Trebnje

Area
  - Total: 0.67 km^{2} (0.26 sq mi)
- Elevation: 310 m (1,020 ft)

Population (2002)
  - Total: 27

Primštal (pronounced [ˈpɾiːmʃtau̯]) is a small village in the Municipality of Trebnje in eastern Slovenia. It lies in the traditional region of Lower Carniola, just to the northeast of Trebnje itself. The municipality is included in the Southeast Slovenia Statistical Region.
