= Wolfgang Engelmann =

German politician (1942–2020)

Member of the Bundestag
- In office 1990–1998

Personal details
- Born: 27 June 1942 Neuwürschnitz, Oelsnitz, East Germany (now Germany)
- Died: 12 November 2020 (aged 78)
- Party: CDU

Wolfgang Engelmann (27 June 1942 – 12 November 2020) was a German politician of the Christian Democratic Union (CDU) and former member of the German Bundestag.

== Life ==
Engelmann was born on 27 June 1942 in Neuwürschnitz. He joined the CDU in 1962. In the 1990 and 1994 federal elections, Engelmann won the direct mandate in the Annaberg - Stollberg - Zschopau constituency and was thus a member of the German Bundestag for eight years.
