= Eisstadion am Friedrichspark =

Ice stadium in Mannheim, Germany

Coordinates: 49°29′08″N 8°27′29″E

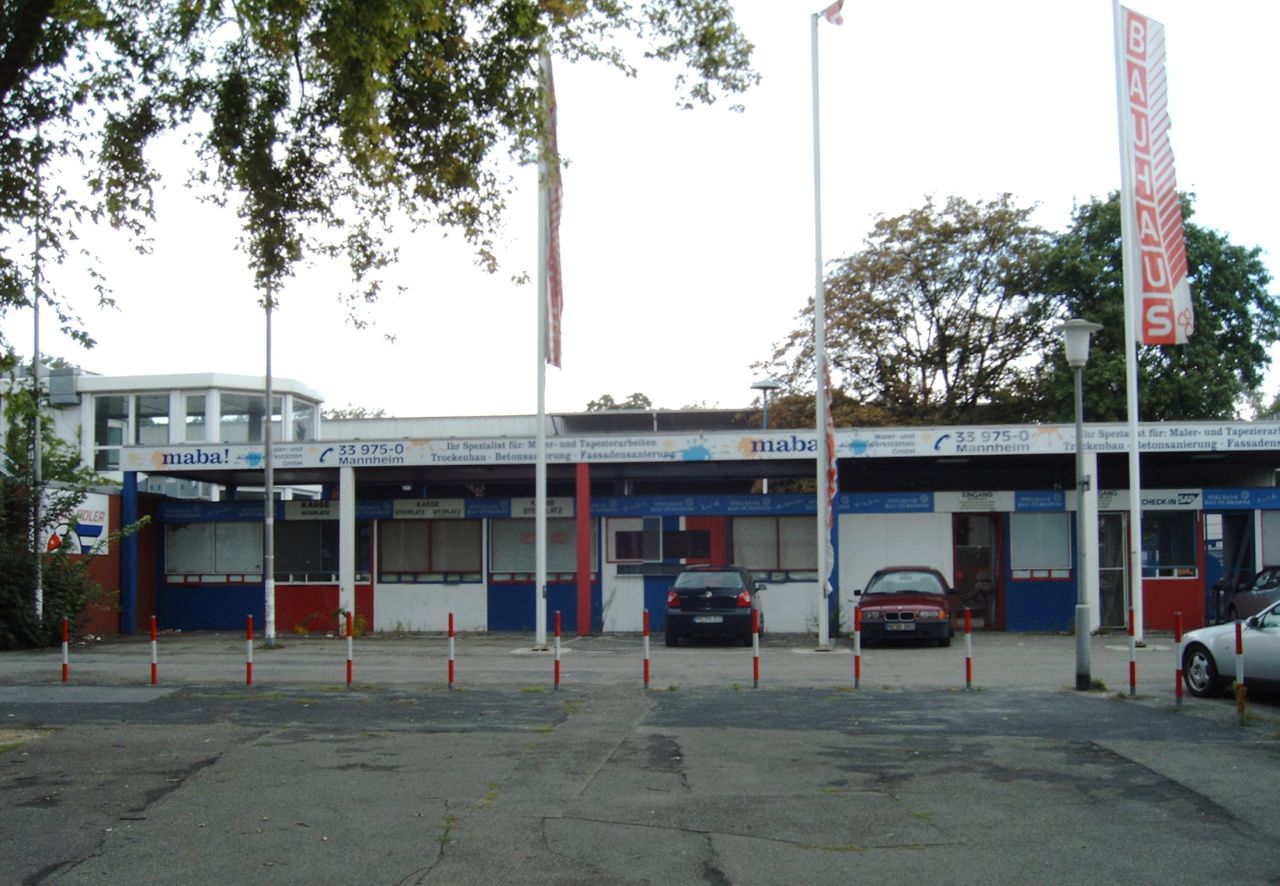
Arena 2006

Eisstadion am Friedrichspark was an indoor sporting arena located in Mannheim, Germany. The capacity of the arena as an ice hockey rink was 8,200. It was the home arena of Adler Mannheim ice hockey team prior to the SAP Arena opening in 2005.

It was built in 1938 and had a long history of hockey games. The greatest event was the match against Düsseldorfer EG in the 1990s when the DEG was still the biggest player in German hockey. The stadium was then filled with over 10,500 people.

The arena is currently used by various inline hockey clubs, mainly ISC Mannheim, and spectator capacity has been reduced to 2,500. Friedrichspark is also the home of the MLRH Oktoberfest international inline hockey tournament. The manager of the rink used to be ex-NHL player Bob Sullivan

== Demolition and future plans ==
The Eisstadion am Friedrichspark in Mannheim has been scheduled for demolition for some time. Originally planned for the summer of 2022, the demolition was delayed due to the discovery of protected wall lizards and additional bureaucratic hurdles. According to reports, discussions with the state government took place, further postponing the start of the demolition. It was finally destroyed in 2024, with archeological findings along the process.

The stadium, which was home to the Adler Mannheim from 1938 to 2005, has a rich history and was the venue for many memorable games and concerts, including performances by the Rolling Stones and Led Zeppelin. After the demolition, the site is planned to be transformed into a multifunctional sports and leisure facility, which will host various sporting and cultural events.
