= Uli Stein =

German footballer (born 1954)

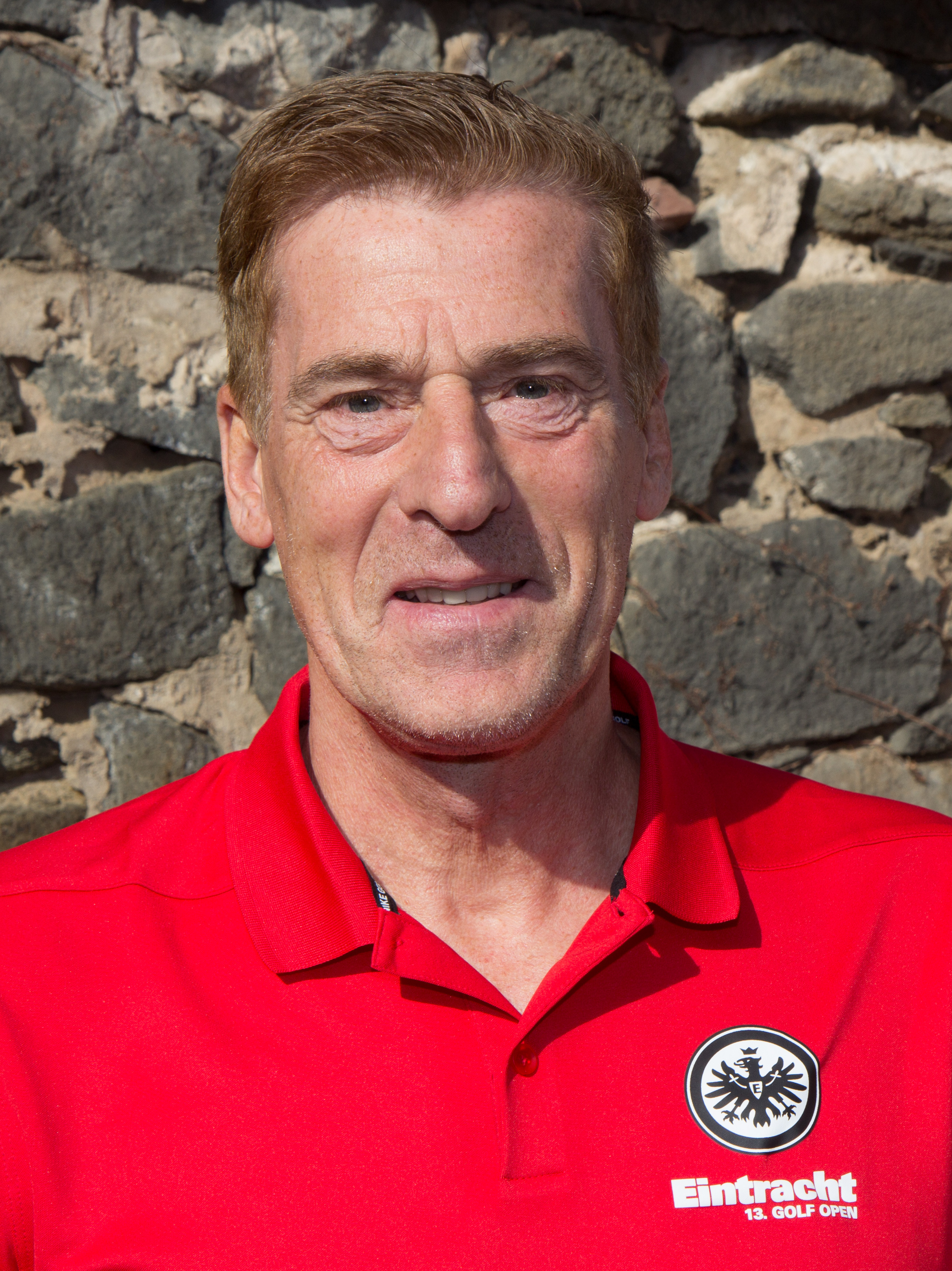
- Stein in 2018

Personal information
- Full name: Ulrich Stein
- Date of birth: 23 October 1954 (age 72)
- Place of birth: Hamburg, West Germany
- Height: 1.86 m (6 ft 1 in)
- Position: Goalkeeper

Youth career
- –1972: FC Nienburg
- 1972–1976: FC Wunstorf

Senior career*
Years	Team	Apps	(Gls)
1976–1980	Arminia Bielefeld	124	(0)
1980–1987	Hamburger SV	209	(0)
1987–1994	Eintracht Frankfurt	224	(0)
1994–1995	Hamburger SV	19	(0)
1995–1997	Arminia Bielefeld	59	(0)
2000	VfL 1945 Pinneberg	1	(0)
2001	Kickers Emden	1	(0)
2003	VfB Fichte Bielefeld	3	(0)
Total		640	(0)

International career
1983–1986	West Germany	6	(0)

Managerial career
- 2000–2001: TuS Celle FC
- 2007–2008: Nigeria (goalkeeper coach)
- 2009–2014: Azerbaijan (goalkeeper coach)
- * Club domestic league appearances and goals

Ulrich "Uli" Stein (born 23 October 1954) is a German former professional footballer who played as a goalkeeper. Between 1978 and 1997, he made 512 appearances in the German Bundesliga.

== Club career ==
Stein began his career in 1978 with Arminia Bielefeld. After two years, he moved to Hamburger SV where he played from 1980 to 1987. From 1987 to 1994 he played for Eintracht Frankfurt, but in 1994 he returned to Hamburger SV. One year later, he transferred to Arminia Bielefeld again. He retired during the 1996–97 season.

He won the DFB-Pokal in 1987 with Hamburger SV and won two German Bundesliga titles, in 1982 and 1983. The highlight of his career was winning the European Cup in 1983. He would also go on to win the DFB-Pokal with Eintracht Frankfurt in 1988.

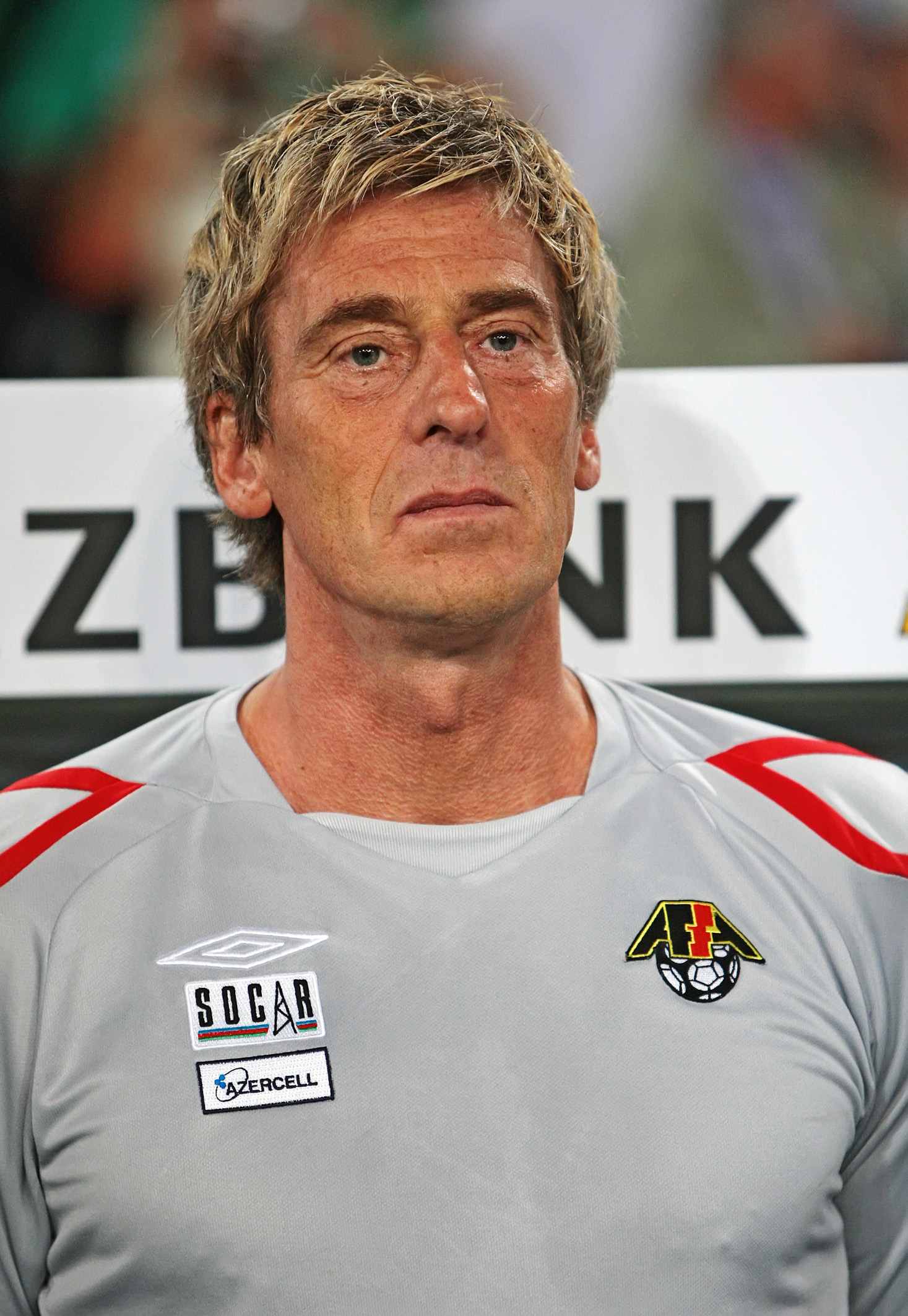
Uli Stein, September 2009

In the DFB-Pokal in the 1986–87 season, in a tie between Hamburger SV and FC Augsburg in the Rosenaustadion, he was given the red card and as he left the pitch, he showed his middle finger to Augsburg's supporters. A more serious incident occurred in 1987 when he punched Jürgen Wegmann of Bayern Munich. Because of this incident, he was fired by Hamburger SV.

He then joined Eintracht Frankfurt, where he played until 1994, when he was fired again. During this period he became one of the most popular goalkeepers ever to have played for the club.

== International career ==
He represented the West Germany national team six times between 1983 and 1986. He was a member of the West German squad defeated by Argentina in the final of the 1986 FIFA World Cup in Mexico. His international career came to an end when he called West German coach, Franz Beckenbauer a Suppenkasper, meaning laughing stock. In his memoirs he denied this. He also voiced his opinion, that he was only second choice because of the pressure from Adidas, the sponsor of first choice goalkeeper Toni Schumacher.

== Managerial career ==
In 2007, he became the goalkeeping coach of Nigeria, in 2008 of Azerbaijan under fellow German Berti Vogts.

== Honours ==
Hamburger SV

- Bundesliga: 1981–82, 1982–83
- DFB-Pokal: 1986–87
- European Cup: 1982–83

Eintracht Frankfurt

- DFB-Pokal: 1987–88

Individual

- kicker Bundesliga Team of the Season: 1983–84, 1990–91
