= Halle Münsterland =

Coordinates: 51°56′53″N 7°38′16″E

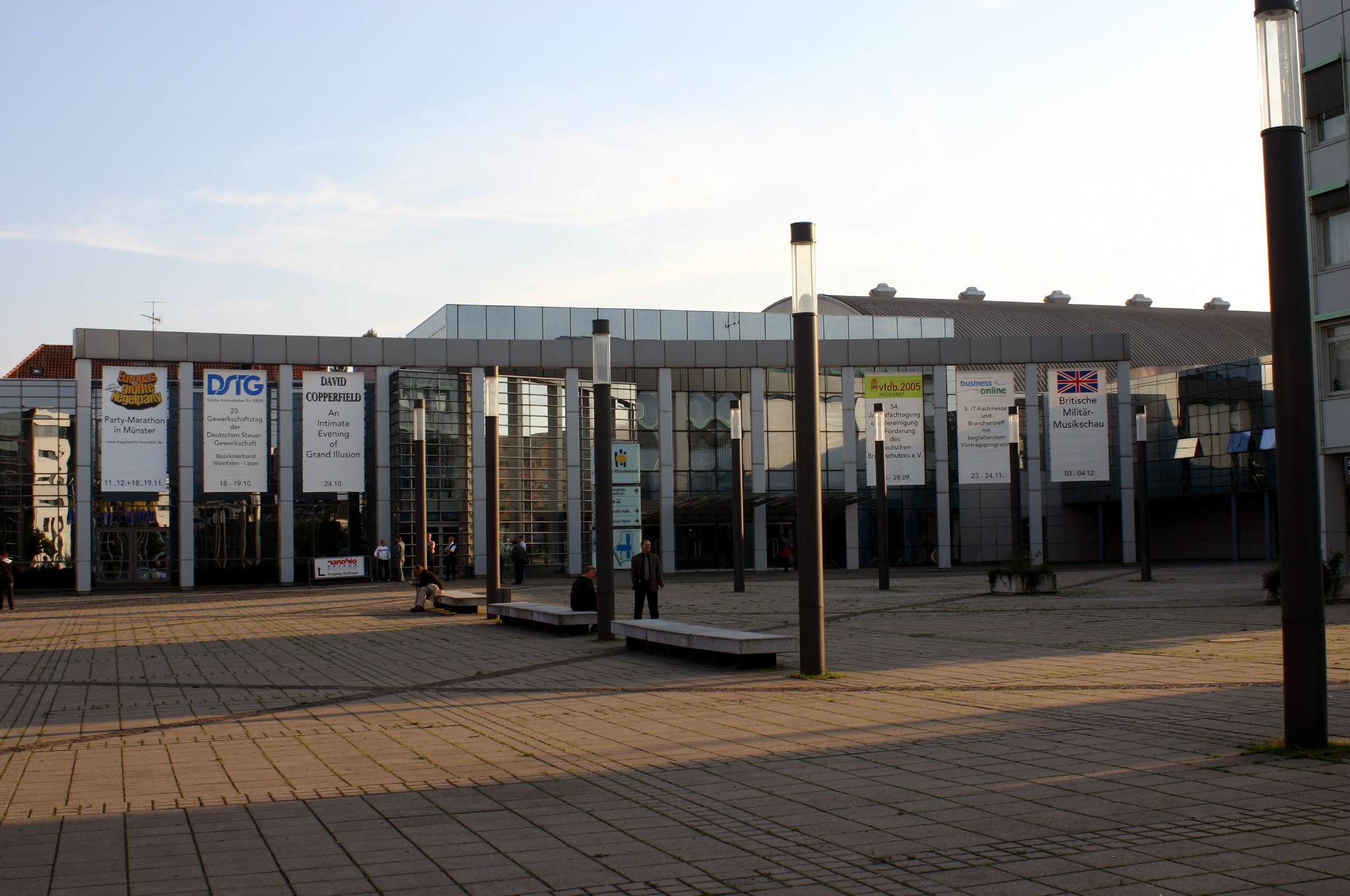
Halle Münsterland entrance

Halle Münsterland is a 7,000-capacity convention center located in Münster, Germany. It has held concerts from well-known artists such as The Rolling Stones, Jethro Tull, Joan Baez, Pet Shop Boys, U2, Andrea Berg, Leonard Cohen, The Who and Chris De Burgh.
