= Karl-Heinz Feldkamp =

German football player and manager (born 1934)

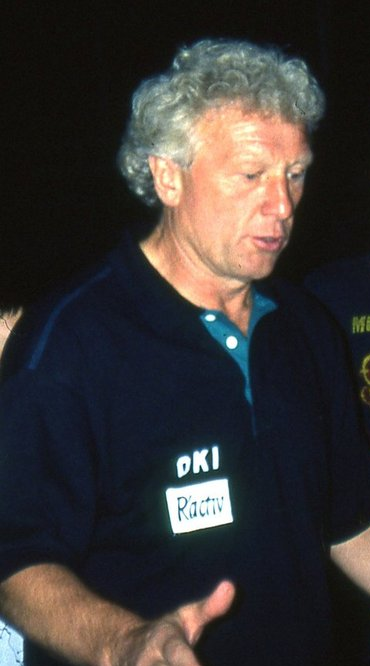

Personal information
- Full name: Karl-Heinz Feldkamp
- Date of birth: 2 June 1934 (age 92)
- Place of birth: Essen, Germany
- Position: Midfielder

Senior career*
Years	Team	Apps	(Gls)
1952–1967	Rot-Weiß Oberhausen	316	(42)

Managerial career
- 1972–1975: Wattenscheid
- 1975–1976: Gütersloh
- 1976–1978: Arminia Bielefeld
- 1978–1982: Kaiserslautern
- 1982–1983: Borussia Dortmund
- 1983–1984: Arminia Bielefeld
- 1984–1987: Uerdingen
- 1987–1988: Eintracht Frankfurt
- 1988–1989: Ismaily SC
- 1990–1992: Kaiserslautern
- 1992–1993: Galatasaray
- 1999: Beşiktaş
- 2007–2008: Galatasaray
- * Club domestic league appearances and goals

Karl-Heinz Feldkamp (born 2 June 1934) is a German retired football manager and player.

Feldkamp started coaching in 1968. In Germany, he coached Borussia Dortmund, 1. FC Kaiserslautern, and Eintracht Frankfurt, among others. He previously coached Galatasaray in 1992–93, and also coached another Istanbul club, Beşiktaş in 1999. During his 1992–93 tenure at the Istanbul club, Feldkamp helped Galatasaray establish a competitive squad with promising Turkish youngsters. These would-be stars included, but are not limited to: Hakan Şükür, Bülent Korkmaz, Hamza Hamzaoğlu, Tugay Kerimoğlu, and Mustafa Kocabey.

While manager of Kaiserslautern he won the 1989–90 DFB-Pokal, followed by the 1990–91 Bundesliga and the 1991 DFB-Supercup. He also won the DFB-Pokal in 1985 with Bayer Uerdingen and in 1988 with Eintracht Frankfurt. While managing in Turkey he guided Galatasaray to the 1992–93 1.Lig title and the 1992–93 Turkish Cup.

He is commonly referred to as "Kalli". Due to his direct and honest interaction with the Turkish media, Turkish newspapers often write about the "Kalli aphorisms."

In June 2007, he returned to Galatasaray by signing a two-year contract and replacing outgoing coach Erik Gerets. He was respected and elevated to the level of almost a "living legend" by Galatasaray supporters. He was known for his rigid "discipline" on and off the training pitch and did not differentiate between "star" and "team" players.

On 5 April 2008, Feldkamp resigned from Galatasaray due to a huge amount of disagreements between himself and the board. Galatasaray President Adnan Polat previously stated that, Feldkamp would not be Galatasaray coach for the 2008–09 season but was responsible for the reserve team and an advisor to the new coach. It was rumoured that his previous occasions with Lincoln and Hakan Şükür just before the derby game against Beşiktaş J.K., and recent modifications in the squad led to the resignation.

On 26 November 2008, Feldkamp officially returned to Galatasaray as the team consultant in order to assist the team manager Michael Skibbe.

== Honours ==
=== Manager ===
Arminia Bielefeld

- 2. Bundesliga: 1977–78

1. FC Kaiserslautern

- Bundesliga: 1990–91
- DFB-Pokal: 1989–90; runner-up 1980–81
- DFB-Supercup: 1991

Bayer 05 Uerdingen

- DFB-Pokal: 1984–85

Eintracht Frankfurt

- DFB-Pokal: 1987–88

Galatasaray

- Süper Lig: 1992–93
- Turkish Cup: 1992–93
