= Włodzimierz Smolarek =

Polish footballer (1957–2012)

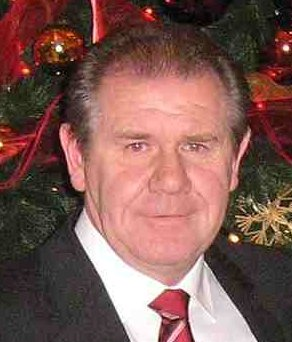

Personal information
- Full name: Włodzimierz Smolarek
- Date of birth: 16 July 1957
- Place of birth: Aleksandrów Łódzki, Poland
- Date of death: 7 March 2012 (aged 54)
- Place of death: Aleksandrów Łódzki, Poland
- Height: 1.71 m (5 ft 7 1/2 in)
- Positions: Winger; attacking midfielder

Youth career
- Włókniarz Aleksandrów Łódzki
- 1973–1976: Widzew Łódź

Senior career*
Years	Team	Apps	(Gls)
1976–1977	Widzew Łódź	0	(0)
1978	Legia Warsaw	18	(4)
1979–1986	Widzew Łódź	181	(61)
1986–1988	Eintracht Frankfurt	63	(13)
1988–1990	Feyenoord	46	(13)
1990–1996	Utrecht	166	(32)
Total		474	(123)

International career
1980–1992	Poland	60	(13)

Managerial career
- 2000–2009: Feyenoord (youth)
Medal record
Men's football
Representing Poland
FIFA World Cup
Third place	1982 Spain
- * Club domestic league appearances and goals

Włodzimierz Wojciech Smolarek (16 July 1957 – 7 March 2012) was a Polish footballer who played as a winger or an attacking midfielder.

He played most of his 20-year professional career with Widzew Łódź and Utrecht, appearing in more than 200 official games for the former. He amassed Eredivisie totals of 212 matches and 45 goals, over the course of eight seasons.

Smolarek represented Poland in two World Cups, earning 60 caps. In 1984 and 1986, he won the Polish Footballer of the Year Award of the Piłka Nożna football weekly.

== Club career ==
Born in Aleksandrów Łódzki, Smolarek played for Widzew Łódź and Legia Warsaw in his country. He won the Ekstraklasa championship with the former side in 1981 and 1982, as well as the 1985 Polish Cup.

In 1986, aged 29, Smolarek was allowed to leave the Iron Curtain nation, starting with Eintracht Frankfurt in the Bundesliga where he won the German Cup in his second season, playing the full 90 minutes in the 1–0 win against VfL Bochum. He retired at 39 after eight years in the Netherlands, with Feyenoord and FC Utrecht, then went on to work with the first club as youth coach for nearly one decade.

== International career ==
Smolarek made his debut for the Poland national team on 12 October 1980, in a 1–2 friendly loss in Argentina. Over the next 12 years he appeared in a further 59 internationals, being selected for the squads at two FIFA World Cups: in 1982 he helped the country finish third in Spain, scoring the opener in a 5–1 first group stage win against Peru. Four years later, celebrating his 50th appearance, he netted the only goal in the group phase contest against Portugal (his 12th and penultimate) in an eventual round-of-16 exit.

In October 2009, Smolarek was hired by the Polish Football Association to oversee the national side's youth program.

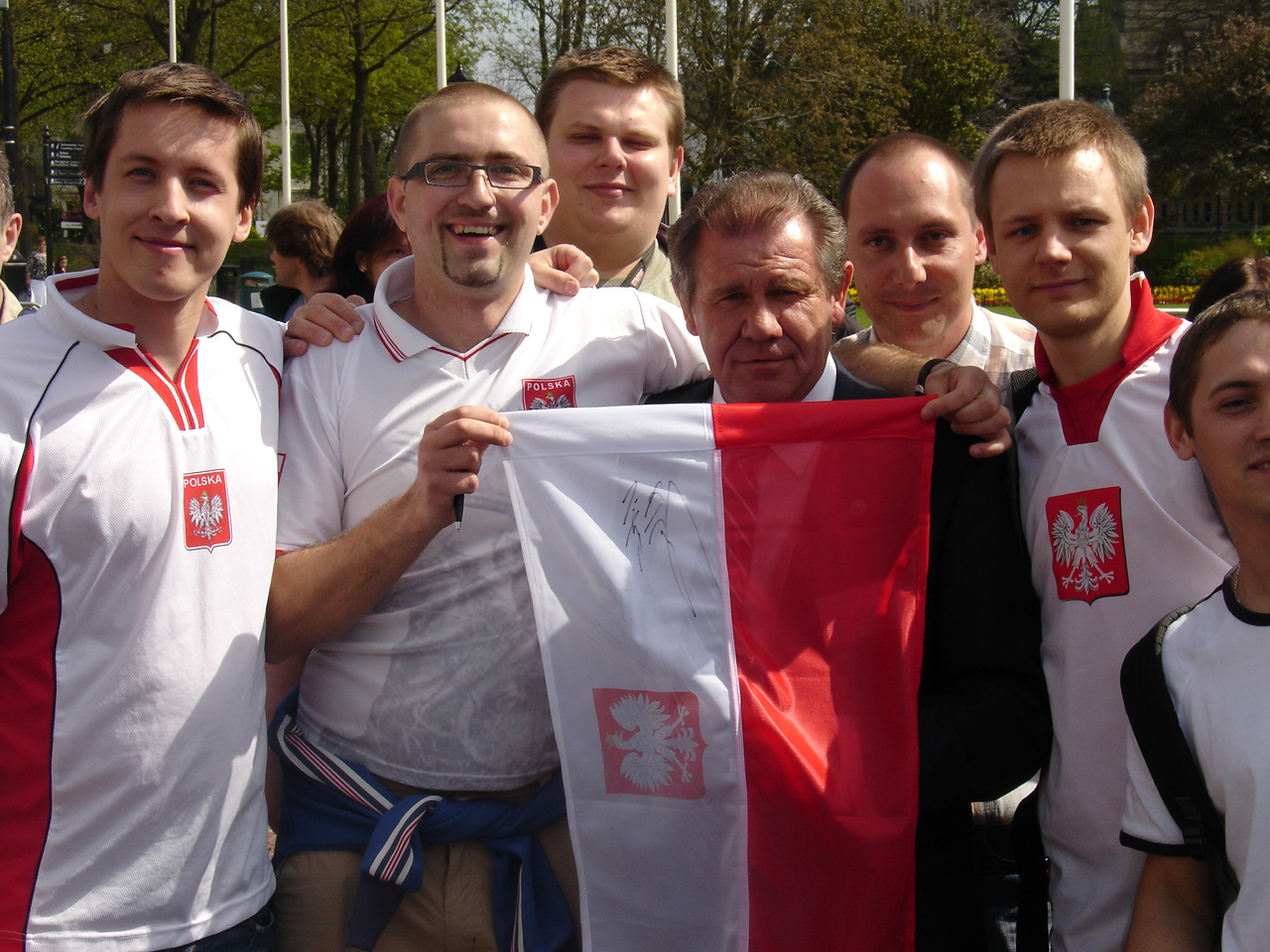
Smolarek behind the Polish flag

== Career statistics ==
=== Club ===
Appearances and goals by club, season and competition
Club	Season	League			National cup (Note: Includes Polish Cup, DFB-Pokal, KNVB Cup)		Europe		Total	
Club	Season	Division	Apps	Goals	Apps	Goals	Apps	Goals	Apps	Goals
Legia Warsaw	1977–78	Ekstraklasa	3	0	0	0	—		3	0
Legia Warsaw	1978–79	Ekstraklasa	15	4	2	2	—		17	6
Legia Warsaw	Total		18	4	2	2	—		20	6
Widzew Łódź	1978–79	Ekstraklasa	4	0	—		—		4	0
Widzew Łódź	1979–80	Ekstraklasa	26	9	2	0	2 (Note: Appearances in UEFA Cup)	0	30	9
Widzew Łódź	1980–81	Ekstraklasa	25	6	2	0	6	1	33	7
Widzew Łódź	1981–82	Ekstraklasa	28	10	3	0	2 (Note: Appearances in European Cup)	2	33	12
Widzew Łódź	1982–83	Ekstraklasa	20	10	1	0	5	1	26	11
Widzew Łódź	1983–84	Ekstraklasa	23	8	2	1	3	0	28	9
Widzew Łódź	1984–85	Ekstraklasa	29	8	6	2	4	1	39	11
Widzew Łódź	1985–86	Ekstraklasa	26	10	2	1	2 (Note: Appearances in European Cup Winners' Cup)	0	30	11
Widzew Łódź	Total		181	61	18	4	24	5	223	70
Eintracht Frankfurt	1986–87	Bundesliga	30	4	3	1	—		33	5
Eintracht Frankfurt	1987–88	Bundesliga	33	9	6	2	—		39	11
Eintracht Frankfurt	Total		63	13	9	3	—		72	16
Feyenoord	1988–89	Eredivisie	31	10	?	2	—		31+	12
Feyenoord	1989–90	Eredivisie	15	3	?	0	1	0	16+	3
Feyenoord	Total		46	13	?	2	1	0	47+	15
Utrecht	1989–90	Eredivisie	15	0	—		—		15	0
Utrecht	1990–91	Eredivisie	32	11	?	1	—		32+	12
Utrecht	1991–92	Eredivisie	31	8	?	1	4	3	35+	12
Utrecht	1992–93	Eredivisie	33	9	2	3	—		35	12
Utrecht	1993–94	Eredivisie	30	1	1	1	—		31	2
Utrecht	1994–95	Eredivisie	23	3	?	0	—		23+	3
Utrecht	1995–96	Eredivisie	2	0	?	0	—		2+	0
Utrecht	Total		166	32	?	6	4	3	173+	41
Career total			474	123	32+	17	29	8	535+	148

=== International ===
Appearances and goals by national team and year
National team	Year	Apps	Goals
Poland
Poland	1980	3	1
Poland	1981	9	4
Poland	1982	8	2
Poland	1983	5	1
Poland	1984	11	2
Poland	1985	10	1
Poland	1986	8	1
Poland	1987	3	1
Poland	1988	2	0
Poland	1992	1	0
Total		60	13

Poland score listed first, score column indicates score after each Smolarek goal.

List of international goals scored by Włodzimierz Smolarek
No.	Date	Venue	Opponent	Score	Result	Competition
1	7 December 1980	Empire Stadium, Gżira, Malta	Malta	1–0	2–0	1982 FIFA World Cup qualification
2	10 October 1981	Zentrastadion, Leipzig, East Germany	East Germany	2–0	3–2	1982 FIFA World Cup qualification
3	10 October 1981	Zentrastadion, Leipzig, East Germany	East Germany	3–1	3–2	1982 FIFA World Cup qualification
4	15 November 1981	Olympic Stadium, Wrocław, Poland	Malta	2–0	6–0	1982 FIFA World Cup qualification
5	15 November 1981	Olympic Stadium, Wrocław, Poland	Malta	4–0	6–0	1982 FIFA World Cup qualification
6	22 June 1982	Estadio Riazor, A Coruña, Spain	Peru	1–0	5–1	1982 FIFA World Cup
7	8 September 1982	Olympic Stadium, Helsinki, Finland	Finland	1–0	3–2	UEFA Euro 1984 qualifying
8	17 April 1983	10th-Anniversary Stadium, Warsaw, Poland	Finland	1–0	1–1	UEFA Euro 1984 qualifying
9	17 October 1984	Municipal Stadium, Zabrze, Poland	Greece	1–1	3–1	1986 FIFA World Cup qualification
10	31 October 1984	Municipal Stadium, Mielec, Poland	Albania	1–0	2–2	1986 FIFA World Cup qualification
11	19 May 1985	Olympic Stadium, Athens, Greece	Greece	1–0	4–1	1986 FIFA World Cup qualification
12	7 June 1986	Estadio Universitario, San Nicolás de los Garza, Mexico	Portugal	1–0	1–0	1986 FIFA World Cup
13	17 May 1987	Népstadion, Budapest, Hungary	Hungary	2–1	3–5	UEFA Euro 1988 qualifying

== Personal life ==
Smolarek was married to Zdzisława, fathering sons Euzebiusz and Mariusz. The former was also a footballer and a forward, who also represented Feyenoord and Poland and also had a three-year spell with Borussia Dortmund.

Smolarek died of a heart attack on 7 March 2012 at the age of 54, in his hometown, Aleksandrów Łódzki.

== Honours ==
Widzew Łódź

- Ekstraklasa: 1980–81, 1981–82
- Polish Cup: 1984–85

Eintracht Frankfurt

- DFB-Pokal: 1987–88

Poland

- FIFA World Cup third place: 1982

Individual

- Order of Polonia Restituta Knight's Cross
- Piłka Nożna Polish Footballer of the Year: 1984, 1986
