= Uwe Freiler =

German footballer

Personal information
- Full name: Uwe Freiler
- Date of birth: 2 May 1966 (age 60)
- Place of birth: Limbach (Saarland), West Germany
- Height: 1.78 m (5 ft 10 in)
- Position: Striker

Youth career
- FC Palatia Limbach

Senior career*
Years	Team	Apps	(Gls)
1983–1988	FC 08 Homburg	140	(35)
1988–1993	SV Waldhof Mannheim	109	(29)
1993–1995	FC 08 Homburg	46	(14)
Total		295	(78)
- * Club domestic league appearances and goals

Uwe Freiler (born 2 May 1966 in Limbach (Saarland)) is a retired German football player. He spent four seasons in the Bundesliga with FC 08 Homburg and SV Waldhof Mannheim.
