= Uwe Leifeld =

German footballer

Personal information
- Full name: Uwe Leifeld
- Date of birth: 24 July 1966 (age 60)
- Place of birth: Münster, West Germany
- Height: 1.78 m (5 ft 10 in)
- Position: Forward

Team information
- Current team: VfL Bochum (scout)

Youth career
- 1971–1983: DJK Borussia Münster
- 1983–1984: SC Preußen Münster

Senior career*
Years	Team	Apps	(Gls)
1984–1985	SC Preußen Münster	32	(13)
1985–1991	VfL Bochum	149	(46)
1991–1993	FC Schalke 04	30	(2)
1993–1996	SC Preußen Münster	86	(28)
Total		297	(89)

International career
1986–1987	West Germany U-21	4	(2)
Medal record
VfL Bochum
Runner-up	DFB-Pokal	1987–88
SC Preußen Münster
Runner-up	Oberliga Westfalen	1993–94
- * Club domestic league appearances and goals

Uwe Leifeld (born 24 July 1966) is a retired German football forward, who works as a scout with VfL Bochum as of 2009.

== Career ==
=== Statistics ===
Club performance			League		Cup		Total	
Season	Club	League	Apps	Goals	Apps	Goals	Apps	Goals
West Germany			League		DFB-Pokal		Total	
1984–85	SC Preußen Münster	Oberliga Westfalen	32	13	—		32	13
1985–86	VfL Bochum	Bundesliga	26	2	4	1	30	3
1986–87	VfL Bochum	Bundesliga	23	8	1	1	24	9
1987–88	VfL Bochum	Bundesliga	30	13	7	3	37	16
1988–89	VfL Bochum	Bundesliga	34	13	3	2	37	15
1989–90	VfL Bochum	Bundesliga	30	10	2	0	32	10
1990–91	VfL Bochum	Bundesliga	6	0	0	0	6	0
Germany			League		DFB-Pokal		Total	
1991–92	FC Schalke 04	Bundesliga	20	2	0	0	20	2
1992–93	FC Schalke 04	Bundesliga	10	0	0	0	10	0
1993–94	SC Preußen Münster	Oberliga Westfalen	29	12	—		29	12
1994–95	SC Preußen Münster	Regionalliga West/Südwest	26	6	1	0	27	6
1995–96	SC Preußen Münster	Regionalliga West/Südwest	31	10	—		31	10
Total	West Germany		181	59	17	7	198	66
Total	Germany		116	30	1	0	117	30
Career total			297	89	18	7	315	96
