= Peter Hobday (footballer) =

English footballer

Personal information
- Date of birth: 9 April 1961 (age 65)
- Place of birth: London, England
- Height: 1.80 m (5 ft 11 in)
- Position: Midfielder

Senior career*
Years	Team	Apps	(Gls)
1978–1979	Gillingham	0	(0)
1979–1983	TuS Schloß Neuhaus		
1983–1986	Stuttgarter Kickers	115	(20)
1986–1988	Hannover 96	52	(5)
1988–1990	Eintracht Frankfurt	17	(1)
1992–1994	TuS Paderborn-Neuhaus		
1994–1997	Arminia Bielefeld	73	(9)
1997	Rot-Weiss Essen	7	(0)
1997–1998	LR Ahlen	7	(0)
Total		271	(35)
- * Club domestic league appearances and goals

Peter Hobday (born 9 April 1961) is an English former professional footballer, active primarily in Germany, who played as a midfielder.

== Career ==
Born in London, Hobday played in England for Gillingham, and in Germany for TuS Schloß Neuhaus, Stuttgarter Kickers, Hannover 96, Eintracht Frankfurt, TuS Paderborn-Neuhaus, Arminia Bielefeld, Rot-Weiss Essen and LR Ahlen.
