= Michael Kostner =

German footballer (born 1969)

Personal information
- Date of birth: 7 February 1969 (age 57)
- Place of birth: Munich, West Germany
- Height: 1.88 m (6 ft 2 in)
- Positions: Defender; defensive midfielder

Team information
- Current team: TSV Dorfen (manager)

Youth career
- Bayern Munich
- Phönix Schleißheim
- TSV Ludwigsfeld

Senior career*
Years	Team	Apps	(Gls)
1987–1989	Eintracht Frankfurt	14	(0)
1989–1991	Kickers Offenbach		
1991–1993	1. FC Saarbrücken	58	(9)
1993–1995	Hamburger SV	28	(0)
1995–1996	FC Homburg		
1996–1998	1. FC Köln	31	(0)
1998–2000	Wacker Burghausen		

Managerial career
- 2000–2002: Wacker Burghausen (youth)
- 2002–2006: Wacker Burghausen II
- 2006–2007: ESV Freilassing
- 2007–2012: TSV Ampfing
- 2012–: TSV Dorfen
- * Club domestic league appearances and goals

Michael Kostner (born 7 February 1969) is a German football coach and a former player who is currently, as of 1 July 2012, is managing TSV Dorfen.

== Honours ==
- DFB-Pokal winner: 1987–88
