= Jarosław Biernat =

Polish footballer (1960–2019)

Personal information
- Date of birth: 6 September 1960
- Place of birth: Szczecin, Poland
- Date of death: 20 April 2019 (aged 58)
- Height: 1.84 m (6 ft 0 in)
- Position: Midfielder

Senior career*
| Years | Team | Apps | (Gls) |
| 1982–1983 | Pogoń Szczecin | | |
| 1983–1985 | Legia Warsaw | 57 | (12) |
| 1985 | Pogoń Szczecin | 14 | (2) |
| 1987 | Eintracht Frankfurt | 9 | (1) |
| 1987–1988 | SG Union Solingen | 22 | (5) |
| 1988–1989 | Eintracht Frankfurt | 3 | (0) |
| 1989–1990 | SpVgg Bayreuth | 17 | (2) |
| 1991–1992 | SG Düren 99 | | |
- * Club domestic league appearances and goals

Jarosław Biernat (6 September 1960 – 20 April 2019) was a Polish professional footballer who played as a midfielder. He died on 20 April 2019, aged 58.

== Honours ==
Pogoń Szczecin

- II liga, group I: 1980–81
