= Ralf Balzis =

German footballer (born 1965)

Personal information
- Full name: Ralf Peter Balzis
- Date of birth: 31 July 1965 (age 61)
- Height: 1.85 m (6 ft 1 in)
- Position: Forward

Senior career*
| Years | Team | Apps | (Gls) |
| 1983–1985 | Kickers Offenbach | | |
| 1985–1987 | Hamburger SV | 30 | (9) |
| 1987–1989 | Eintracht Frankfurt | 35 | (5) |
| 1989–1990 | First Vienna | 63 | (17) |
| 1991 | Austria Salzburg | 14 | (1) |
| 1991–1996 | VfL Osnabrück | | |
| 1996–1997 | SG Wattenscheid 09 | | |
| 1997–1999 | SV Wilhelmshaven | | |
| 1999–2001 | Sportfreunde Lotte | | |
- * Club domestic league appearances and goals

Ralf Balzis (born 31 July 1965) is a German former professional footballer who played as a forward.
