= Frank Hartmann (footballer, born September 1960) =

German footballer and coach

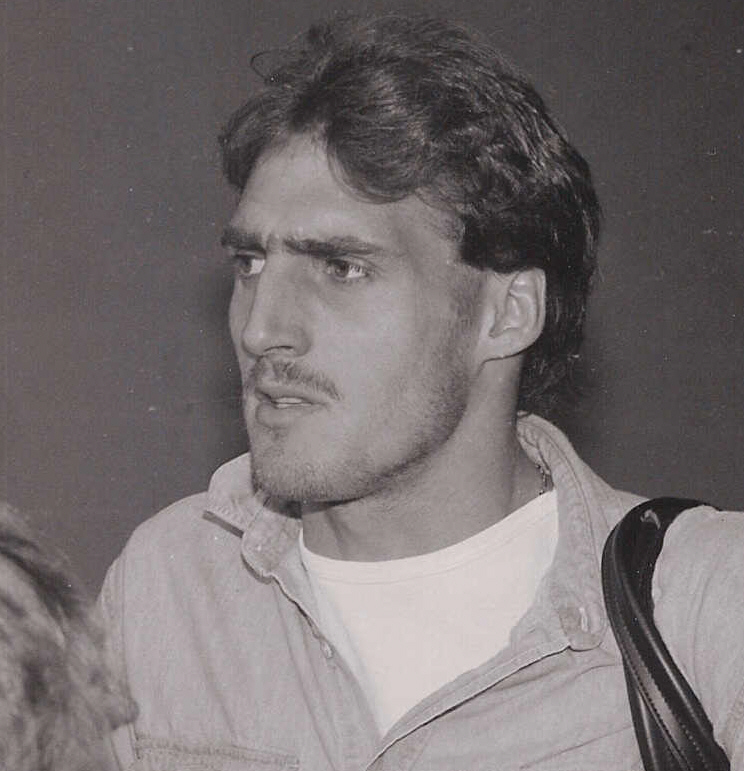

Personal information
- Date of birth: 27 September 1960 (age 66)
- Place of birth: Koblenz, West Germany
- Height: 1.76 m (5 ft 9 in)
- Position: Midfielder

Youth career
- TuS Treis/Karden
- TuS Binningen-Forst

Senior career*
Years	Team	Apps	(Gls)
1980–1984	1. FC Köln	84	(6)
1984–1986	FC Schalke 04	52	(20)
1986–1990	1. FC Kaiserslautern	99	(30)
1990–1993	SG Wattenscheid 09	65	(8)

Managerial career
- 1994: SG Wattenscheid 09
- 1995–1996: FV Engers 07
- * Club domestic league appearances and goals

Frank Hartmann (born 27 September 1960) is a German football coach and a former player.

== Honours ==
- Bundesliga runner-up: 1981–82
- DFB-Pokal winner: 1982–83, 1989–90
