= Dieter Schlindwein =

German footballer (born 1961)

Personal information
- Date of birth: 7 February 1961 (age 65)
- Place of birth: Karlsdorf-Neuthard, West Germany
- Height: 1.87 m (6 ft 2 in)
- Position: Full-back

Youth career
- –1977: FC Germania 06 Karlsdorf
- 1977–1978: Waldhof Mannheim

Senior career*
Years	Team	Apps	(Gls)
1978–1986	Waldhof Mannheim	221	(17)
1986–1987	Werder Bremen	3	(0)
1987–1989	Eintracht Frankfurt	32	(1)
1989–1996	FC St. Pauli	144	(5)
Total		400	(23)
- * Club domestic league appearances and goals

Dieter Schlindwein (born 7 February 1961) is a German former professional footballer who played as a full-back.

== Club career ==
In his youth Schlindwein played for FC Germania 06 Karlsdorf. With SV Waldhof Mannheim, who signed him in 1977, he promoted in 1983–84 to the Bundesliga.

In 1986, he moved to Werder Bremen but stayed just one season appearing only three times. He joined Eintracht Frankfurt for their 1987–88 campaign and won with SGE the DFB-Pokal in 1988.

From 1989–90 to 1995–96 he played for FC St. Pauli, where he captained the squad. His last professional match took place on 16 March 1996 against Borussia Mönchengladbach; FC St. Pauli lost 2–0. He bid farewell with a red card.

In total he took part in 186 Bundesliga and 214 second tier fixtures.

== International career ==
Schlindwein was capped five times for the Germany under-21 and once for the Germany national amateur team and once in the German olympic team that took part at the Olympic games in Los Angeles).

== Style of play ==
A qualified industrial clerk, Schlindwein earned the nickname Eisen-Dieter ("Iron Dieter") due to his rough playing style.

== Honours ==
Eintracht Frankfurt

- DFB-Pokal: 1987–88
