= Janusz Turowski (footballer) =

Polish footballer and coach

Personal information
- Date of birth: 7 February 1961 (age 65)
- Place of birth: Bydgoszcz, Poland
- Height: 1.76 m (5 ft 9 in)
- Position: Forward

Senior career*
Years	Team	Apps	(Gls)
1977–1978	Polonia Bydgoszcz		
1978–1979	Zawisza Bydgoszcz		
1979–1982	Pogoń Szczecin		
1982–1984	Legia Warsaw	75	(13)
1984–1985	Pogoń Szczecin	32	(10)
1986–1991	Eintracht Frankfurt	105	(28)
1991–1993	VfB Leipzig	42	(11)

Managerial career
- 2006: FV Bad Vilbel
- * Club domestic league appearances and goals

Janusz Turowski (born 7 February 1961) is a Polish football coach and former player. He played a total of 125 Ekstraklasa matches and scored 28 goals.

== Honours ==
Eintracht Frankfurt

- DFB-Pokal: 1987–88
