= Ralf Sievers =

German footballer

Personal information
- Full name: Ralf Sievers
- Date of birth: 30 October 1961 (age 65)
- Place of birth: Lüneburg, West Germany
- Height: 1.75 m (5 ft 9 in)
- Position: Midfielder

Youth career
- SV Eddelstorf
- Lüneburger SK

Senior career*
| Years | Team | Apps | (Gls) |
| –1982 | Lüneburger SK | | |
| 1982–1990 | Eintracht Frankfurt | 205 | (9) |
| 1990–1993 | FC St. Pauli | 71 | (2) |
| 1993–2001 | Lüneburger SK | | |
Medal record
Representing West Germany
Men's Football
| Bronze medal – third place | 1988 Seoul | Team competition |
- * Club domestic league appearances and goals

Ralf Sievers (born 30 October 1961) is a German former professional footballer who played as a midfielder, most notably with Eintracht Frankfurt.

== Career ==
Like his brother Jörg he began his career at Lower Saxon club SV Eddelstorf. From 1982 until 1991, Sievers played 232 matches in the Bundesliga for Eintracht Frankfurt and FC St.Pauli, scoring ten goals. From 1991 until 1993 he appeared in 44 fixtures for St.Pauli (one goal) in the 2. Bundesliga. 1988 was his most successful season. With Frankfurt he won the 1987–88 DFB-Pokal on 28 May 1988 and was part of the German olympic team that won the bronze medal at the Summer Olympics in Seoul.

His brother Jörg was goalkeeper with Hannover 96 where he is goalkeeping coach from 2003 until 2020.

== Trivia ==
His nickname Colt Sievers derives from The Fall Guy character Colt Seavers.

== Honours ==
Eintracht Frankfurt

- DFB-Pokal: 1987–88
