= Dieter Pauly =

German football referee (1942–2024)

- Born: 14 February 1942; Rheydt, Germany
- Died: 13 February 2024 (aged 81); Ko Samui

Domestic
Years	League	Role
1980–1990	Bundesliga	Referee

International
Years	League	Role
1982–1990	FIFA–listed	Referee

Dieter Pauly (14 February 1942 – 13 February 2024) was a German football referee. He refereed the Bucharest leg of the Liverpool vs Dinamo Bucharest, 1984 European Cup Semi-Final and a match in the UEFA Euro 1988 on home soil in West Germany. Pauly died in Ko Samui on 13 February 2024, at the age of 81.
