= Drentwede =

- Municipality
- Location of Drentwede within Diepholz district
- Interactive map of Drentwede
- Location within Germany Location within Lower Saxony
- Coordinates: 52°44′N 08°34′E
- Country: Germany
- State: Lower Saxony
- District: Diepholz
- Municipal assoc.: Barnstorf
- Subdivisions: 2 Ortsteile

Government
  - Mayor: Theo Amelung

Area
  - Total: 30.31 km^{2} (11.70 sq mi)
- Elevation: 43 m (141 ft)

Population (2025-12-31)
  - Total: 1,008
  - Density: 33.26/km^{2} (86.13/sq mi)
- Time zone: UTC+01:00 (CET)
  - Summer (DST): UTC+02:00 (CEST)
- Postal codes: 49406
- Dialling codes: 04246 und 05442
- Vehicle registration: DH
- Website: www.drentwede.de

Drentwede is a municipality in the district of Diepholz, in Lower Saxony, Germany.
