= Frank Schulz (footballer, born 1961) =

German footballer and coach

Personal information
- Full name: Frank Schulz
- Date of birth: 18 February 1961 (age 65)
- Place of birth: Remscheid, West Germany
- Height: 1.86 m (6 ft 1 in)
- Position: Midfielder

Youth career
- –1980: Westfalia Herne

Senior career*
Years	Team	Apps	(Gls)
1980–1983	Westfalia Herne		
1983–1987	VfL Bochum	116	(30)
1987–1989	Eintracht Frankfurt	50	(10)
1989–1990	VfL Osnabrück	31	(5)
1990–1993	Borussia Mönchengladbach	47	(4)
1993–1995	Alemannia Aachen		

Managerial career
- 2003–2008: Westfalia Herne
- 2008: BV Cloppenburg
- 2009–2010: Westfalia Herne
- 2010–2011: SSVg Velbert
- * Club domestic league appearances and goals

Frank Schulz (born 18 February 1961) is a German former football player and coach.

== Honours ==
- DFB-Pokal winner: 1988
- DFB-Pokal finalist: 1992
