= 1991–92 Eintracht Frankfurt season =

Eintracht Frankfurt
1991-92 season
- Chairman: Matthias Ohms
- Manager: Dragoslav Stepanović
- Bundesliga: 3rd
- DFB-Pokal: 2nd Round
- UEFA Cup: 2nd Round
- Top goalscorer: League: Tony Yeboah (15); All: Tony Yeboah (17)
- Highest home attendance: 60,500 21 March 1992 v Bayern Munich (league)
- Lowest home attendance: 14,000 on two occasions (league)
- Average home league attendance: 29,816
Home colours	Away colours

The 1991–92 Eintracht Frankfurt season was the 92nd season in the club's football history. In 1991–92 the club played in the Bundesliga, the top tier of German football. It was the club's 29th season in the Bundesliga.

The season ended up with Eintracht claiming the 3rd position in the reunited Germany's Bundesliga, losing the championship on the last match day when already relegated Rostock won the match.

== Friendlies ==
Win Draw Loss

10 July 1991	Wetterau XI	3–8	Eintracht Frankfurt	Bad Nauheim, Germany
	Goal	(Report)	Bein; Binz; Sippel; Yeboah; Lauf; Kruse	Attendance: 2,000

12 July 1991	Rot-Weiss Frankfurt	1–2	Eintracht Frankfurt
	Goal	(Report)	Binz; Schmitt	Attendance: 2,000

13 July 1991	AS Cannes	1–1 (5–6 p)	Eintracht Frankfurt
	Goal	(Report)	Yeboah	Attendance: 5,000
	Penalties
	Penalty scored Penalty missed		(penalty scored) Binz; (penalty scored) Roth; (penalty scored) Sippel; (penalty scored) Schmitt; (penalty scored) Lauf

16 July 1991	FC Kufstein	0–8	Eintracht Frankfurt	Austria
		(Report)	Binz 3', 73'; Yeboah 22'; Bein 54' (pen.); Kruse 60', 85', 87'; Lasser 75'	Attendance: 800; Referee: Mayerhofer

19 July 1991	FC Vils	0–11	Eintracht Frankfurt	Vils, Austria
		(Report)	Gründel; Kruse; Möller; Binz; Bein; Bindewald; Sippel; Lauf	Attendance: 1,200

23 July 1991	FSV Frankfurt	0–16	Eintracht Frankfurt	Frankfurt, Germany
		(Report)	Bein 6', 13', 62', 69', 75', 80'; Binz 24', 45', 90'; Kruse 33'; Lasser 36'; Möller 42', 52', 85'; Studer 49'	Stadium: Stadion am Bornheimer Hang; Attendance: 2,000

27 July 1991	Eintracht Trier	1–5	Eintracht Frankfurt
	Merkel 53'	(Report)	Bein 10' (pen.), 74'; Kruse 61'; Möller 64', 80'	Attendance: 2,000

30 July 1991	SpVgg Bad Homburg	0–9	Eintracht Frankfurt
		(Report)	Gründel; Kruse; Schmitt; Möller; Binz; Sippel	Attendance: 3,000

6 August 1991	SG 01 Hoechst	1–9	Eintracht Frankfurt
	Goal	(Report)	Falkenmayer; Kruse; Gründel; Klein; Bein; Lauf; Conrad; Schmitt	Attendance: 1,500

7 September 1991	Idar-Oberstein XI	1–12	Eintracht Frankfurt
	Goal	(Report)	Yeboah; Lasser; Sippel; Binz; Bein; Weber

24 September 1991	Vatanspor Bad Homburg	4–9	Eintracht Frankfurt	Bad Homburg, Germany
	Sen 16'; Özel 73'; Nahsen 81'; Keskin 90'	(Report)	Lasser 8'; Kruse 21', 23', 37'; Bein 32'; Schmitt 51', 77'; Sippel 60', 64'	Attendance: 2,000; Referee: Hartmann

6 October 1991 Farewell match for Charly Körbel with current and alumni teams	Eintracht Frankfurt	4–4	Bayern Munich	Frankfurt, Germany
20:15 CEST	Hölzenbein 21'; Andersen 44'; Körbel 63' (pen.), 79'	(Report)	Bender 48'; Grahammer 61'; Castro 75'; Augenthaler 90'	Stadium: Waldstadion; Attendance: 12,000; Referee: Neuner

15 October 1991	SV Jügesheim	1–3	Eintracht Frankfurt
	Goal	(Report)	Sippel	Attendance: 2,000

29 October 1991	Borussia Fulda	1–4	Eintracht Frankfurt
	Goal	(Report)	Kruse; Schmitt; Gründel	Attendance: 3,500

14 January 1992 Torneo internacional de fútbol de Maspalomas; Semi-Final	FC Schalke 04	1–1 (a.e.t.) (5–2 p)	Eintracht Frankfurt	Maspalomas, Spain
	Christensen 27'	(Report)	Schmitt 47'	Attendance: 5,000
	Penalties
	Penalty scored		(penalty scored) (penalty scored); (penalty missed) Bein; (penalty missed) Kruse

16 January 1992 Torneo internacional de fútbol de Maspalomas; 3rd place play-off	IFK Göteborg	1–1 (a.e.t.) (5–6 p)	Eintracht Frankfurt
	Sippel 83' (o.g.)	(Report)	Kruse 21'	Attendance: 1,000
	Penalties
	Penalty scored Penalty missed		(penalty scored) Sippel; (penalty scored) Kruse; (penalty scored) Binz; (penalty scored) Wolf; (penalty scored) Klein; (penalty scored) Stein

23 January 1992	SpVgg Bad Homburg	1–4	Eintracht Frankfurt
		(Report)	Sippel; Kruse; Weber	Attendance: 500

25 January 1992	Eintracht Frankfurt	6–2	Viktoria Aschaffenburg	Frankfurt, Germany
		(Report)		Stadium: Hot air tent next to Riederwaldstadion

26 January 1992	FC Schweinfurt 05	1–1	Eintracht Frankfurt	Schweinfurt, Germany
14:00 CEST	Goal	(Report)	Falkenmayer	Stadium: Willy-Sachs-Stadion; Attendance: 11,000

30 January 1992	Eintracht Frankfurt	9–1	Rot-Weiss Frankfurt	Frankfurt, Germany
	Sippel; Andersen; Brunetti; Weber; Binz; Bindewald	(Report)	Goal	Stadium: Hot air tent next to Riederwaldstadion

1 February 1992	Eintracht Frankfurt	5–1	SV Waldhof Mannheim
	Sippel 26'; Binz 31'; Schmitt 63', 83'; Klein 73'	(Report)	Lust 82'	Attendance: 700; Referee: Brückner

3 February 1992	Eintracht Frankfurt	1–0	SV Darmstadt 98	Frankfurt, Germany
	Weber 54'	(Report)		Stadium: Waldstadion; Attendance: 500; Referee: Lehnhardt

25 February 1992	Eintracht Frankfurt	4–1	Rot-Weiß Walldorf	Frankfurt, Germany
	Schmitt 15'; Yeboah 49' (pen.), 75'; Möller 62'	(Report)	Kotarac 47'	Stadium: Riederwaldstadion; Attendance: 100; Referee: Büntemeyer

14 April 1992	Rödelheimer FC 02	0–11	Eintracht Frankfurt
		(Report)	Weber; Sippel; Studer; Gründel; Kruse; Andersen; Reis; Balser o.g.'	Attendance: 500

20 May 1992	Wacker Bad Salzungen	0–9	Eintracht Frankfurt	Bad Salzungen, Germany
		(Report)	Schmitt; Lasser; Yeboah; Kruse; Andersen	Attendance: 4,000

21 May 1992	Maintal XI	1–12	Eintracht Frankfurt	Maintal, Germany
18:00 CEST	Eschmann 72'	(Report)	Yeboah 4', 15', 36'; Uli Stein 13', 76'; Schmitt 40'; Klein 41', 55'; Kruse 67', 74', 83'; Bunzenthal 81'	Stadium: Waldsportplatz Maintal-Hochstadt; Attendance: 3,000; Referee: Becker

22 May 1992	SV Bernbach	1–3	Eintracht Frankfurt	Freigericht, Germany
19:00 CEST		(Report)	Yeboah; Schmitt	Stadium: Sportplatz Birkenhainer Straße; Attendance: 2,500

24 May 1992	Bayern Munich	6–0	Eintracht Frankfurt	Forbach, France
	Labbadia 17', 39'; Grahammer 28'; Ziege 49' (pen.); Kreuzer 54'; Kientz 76' (o.g.)	(Report)		Attendance: 2,000

26 May 1992	FSV Bad Orb	3–6	Eintracht Frankfurt
	Goal	(Report)	Schmitt; Studer	Attendance: 3,000

27 May 1992	VfL Trier	3–5	Eintracht Frankfurt	Trier, Germany
19:00 CEST	Goal	(Report)	Schmitt; Yeboah	Stadium: Bezirks-Sportanlage Heiligkreuz

28 May 1992	SV Niederursel	1–7	Eintracht Frankfurt
	Goal	(Report)	Falkenmayer; Andersen; Lasser; Weber; Ernst ?	Attendance: 1,500

29 May 1992	SC Urbach	1–11	Eintracht Frankfurt
	Österle	(Report)	Andersen; Schmitt; Okocha; Yeboah; Falkenmayer; Studer; Ernst; Balzer

30 May 1992	Marburg XI	2–8	Eintracht Frankfurt	Lohra, Germany
	Laus; Bensmann	(Report)	Schmitt; Lasser; Weber; Falkenmayer; Yeboah; Stein	Attendance: 3,000

== Indoor soccer tournament ==
19 January 1992 First match	Karlsruher SC Amateure	2–1	Eintracht Frankfurt	Karlsruhe, Germany
	Rapp; Merx	(Report)	Sippel

19 January 1992 Second match	Dukla Praha	2–2	Eintracht Frankfurt	Karlsruhe, Germany
	Urban; Pivarník	(Report)	Möller; Weber

19 January 1992 Semi-Final	1. FC Kaiserslautern	1–1 (5–4 p)	Eintracht Frankfurt	Karlsruhe, Germany
	Goldbæk	(Report)	Bein

19 January 1992 Final	Karlsruher SC	3–0	Eintracht Frankfurt	Karlsruhe, Germany
	Metz; Schuster; Westerbeek	(Report)

== Competitions ==
Win Draw Loss

=== Bundesliga ===
==== League table ====
Pos	Team	Pld	W	D	L	GF	GA	GD	Pts	Qualification or relegation
1	VfB Stuttgart (C)	38	21	10	7	62	32	+30	52	Qualification to Champions League first round
2	Borussia Dortmund	38	20	12	6	66	47	+19	52	Qualification to UEFA Cup first round
3	Eintracht Frankfurt	38	18	14	6	76	41	+35	50	Qualification to UEFA Cup first round
4	1. FC Köln	38	13	18	7	58	41	+17	44	Qualification to UEFA Cup first round
5	1. FC Kaiserslautern	38	17	10	11	58	42	+16	44	Qualification to UEFA Cup first round

Source: www.dfb.de
Rules for classification: 1) points; 2) goal difference; 3) number of goals scored.
The league contracted back to 18 teams for the 1992–93 season.
(C) Champions

==== Results by round ====
Round	1	2	3	4	5	6	7	8	9	10	11	12	13	14	15	16	17	18	19	20	21	22	23	24	25	26	27	28	29	30	31	32	33	34	35	36	37	38
Ground	A	H	A	H	A	H	A	H	H	A	H	A	H	A	H	A	H	A	H	H	A	H	A	H	A	H	A	A	H	A	H	A	H	A	H	A	H	A
Result	W	W	L	W	D	W	L	W	D	D	W	W	D	W	L	W	D	L	W	D	D	W	D	L	D	W	W	W	W	D	D	D	D	W	W	W	D	L
Position	3	1	3	2	2	1	2	1	1	2	1	1	1	1	1	1	1	1	1	1	2	2	2	3	4	2	2	2	2	2	1	3	2	1	1	1	1	3

Source: kicker.de
A = Away; H = Home; W = Win; D = Draw; L = Loss

==== Matches ====
3 August 1991 1	Fortuna Düsseldorf	1–2	Eintracht Frankfurt	Düsseldorf, Germany
15:30 CEST	Schreier 18'	(Report)	Möller 6'; Sippel 80'	Stadium: Rheinstadion; Attendance: 17,000; Referee: Föckler

10 August 1991 2	Eintracht Frankfurt	5–0	FC Schalke 04	Frankfurt, Germany
15:30 CEST	Kruse 13', 80'; Sippel 53'; Möller 56', 77'	(Report)		Stadium: Waldstadion; Attendance: 44,000; Referee: Osmers

13 August 1991 3	Dynamo Dresden	2–1	Eintracht Frankfurt	Dresden, Germany
20:00 CEST	Gütschow 40', 81'; Wagenhaus (red card) 60'	(Report)	Möller 27'	Stadium: Rudolf-Harbig-Dresden; Attendance: 20,500; Referee: Wiesel

21 August 1991 4	Eintracht Frankfurt	2–1	VfL Bochum	Frankfurt, Germany
20:00 CEST	Bein 59'; Kruse 62'	(Report)	Roth o.g.' (43)	Stadium: Waldstadion; Attendance: 18,000; Referee: Stenzel

24 August 1991 5	1. FC Köln	1–1	Eintracht Frankfurt	Cologne, Germany
15:30 CEST	Baumann (red card) 59'; Ordenewitz 63' (pen.)	(Report)	Kruse 36'	Stadium: Müngersdorfer Stadion; Attendance: 21,000; Referee: Berg

28 August 1991 6	Eintracht Frankfurt	2–0	1. FC Kaiserslautern	Frankfurt, Germany
20:00 CEST	Kuntz 61' (o.g.); Yeboah 64'	(Report)		Stadium: Waldstadion; Attendance: 45,000; Referee: Assenmacher

31 August 1991 7	Hamburger SV	2–1	Eintracht Frankfurt	Hamburg, Germany
15:30 CEST	Eck 49'; Furtok 54' (pen.)	(Report)	Yeboah 75'	Stadium: Volksparkstadion; Attendance: 21,500; Referee: Dardenne

6 September 1991 8	Eintracht Frankfurt	6–1	Stuttgarter Kickers	Frankfurt, Germany
20:00 CEST	Sippel 14', 30', 74'; Möller 38'; Bein 42' (pen.); Yeboah 47'	(Report)	Cayasso 50'	Stadium: Waldstadion; Attendance: 14,000; Referee: Steinborn

14 September 1991 9	Eintracht Frankfurt	2–2	1. FC Nürnberg	Frankfurt, Germany
20:30 CEST	Bein 25'; Falkenmayer 34'	(Report)	Brunner 52'; Eckstein 75'	Stadium: Waldstadion; Attendance: 31,000; Referee: Heynemann

21 September 1991 10	Bayern Munich	3–3	Eintracht Frankfurt	Munich, Germany
15:30 CEST	Labbadia 35', 55'; Bender 47'	(Report)	Andersen 36', 82'; Yeboah 54'	Stadium: Olympiastadion; Attendance: 64,000; Referee: Theobald

28 September 1991 11	Eintracht Frankfurt	3–0	Borussia Dortmund	Frankfurt, Germany
15:30 CEST	Weber 20'; Sippel 55'; Möller 71'	(Report)		Stadium: Waldstadion; Attendance: 29,000; Referee: Fröhlich

5 October 1991 12	VfB Stuttgart	1–2	Eintracht Frankfurt	Stuttgart, Germany
15:30 CEST	Gaudino 45'	(Report)	Andersen 60'; Yeboah 80'	Stadium: Neckarstadion; Attendance: 48,500; Referee: Krug

11 October 1991 13	Eintracht Frankfurt	0–0	Borussia Mönchengladbach	Frankfurt, Germany
20:00 CEST		(Report)		Stadium: Waldstadion; Attendance: 33,000; Referee: Albrecht

19 October 1991 14	SG Wattenscheid 09	2–4	Eintracht Frankfurt	Bochum, Germany
15:30 CEST	Sané 58'; Schupp 60'	(Report)	Bein 8', 77'; Yeboah 46'; Sippel 51'	Stadium: Lohrheidestadion; Attendance: 8,000; Referee: Dellwing

26 October 1991 15	Eintracht Frankfurt	0–1	Bayer Leverkusen	Frankfurt, Germany
15:30 CEST		(Report)	Bindewald 13' (o.g.)	Stadium: Waldstadion; Attendance: 33,000; Referee: Ziller

1 November 1991 16	MSV Duisburg	3–6	Eintracht Frankfurt	Duisburg, Germany
19:30 CEST	Nijhuis 17'; Tönnies 52' (pen.); Woelk 71'	(Report)	Bein 11'; Möller 24'; Andersen 25'; Sippel 54', 80'; Yeboah 89'	Stadium: Wedaustadion; Attendance: 29,000; Referee: Mierswa

9 November 1991 17	Eintracht Frankfurt	1–1	Karlsruher SC	Frankfurt, Germany
15:30 CEST	Yeboah 84'	(Report)	Reich 52'	Stadium: Waldstadion; Attendance: 17,000; Referee: Aust

15 November 1991 18	Werder Bremen	1–0	Eintracht Frankfurt	Bremen, Germany
20:00 CEST	Allofs 82'	(Report)		Stadium: Weserstadion; Attendance: 21,500; Referee: Führer

23 November 1991 19	Eintracht Frankfurt	2–0	Hansa Rostock	Frankfurt, Germany
15:30 CEST	Weber 46'; Yeboah 48'	(Report)		Stadium: Waldstadion; Attendance: 21,000; Referee: Löwer

30 November 1991 20	Eintracht Frankfurt	1–1	Fortuna Düsseldorf	Frankfurt, Germany
15:30 CEST	Weber 82'	(Report)	Demandt 74'	Stadium: Waldstadion; Attendance: 17,000; Referee: Merk

5 December 1991 21	FC Schalke 04	1–1	Eintracht Frankfurt	Gelsenkirchen, Germany
20:00 CEST	Ingo Anderbrügge 89' (pen.)	(Report)	Andersen 25'	Stadium: Parkstadion; Attendance: 45,000; Referee: Wiesel

14 December 1991 22	Eintracht Frankfurt	3–0	Dynamo Dresden	Frankfurt, Germany
15:30 CEST	Bein 13' (pen.), 48'; Andersen 26'	(Report)		Stadium: Waldstadion; Attendance: 14,000; Referee: Osmers

7 February 1992 23	VfL Bochum	0–0	Eintracht Frankfurt	Bochum, Germany
20:00 CEST		(Report)		Stadium: Ruhrstadion; Attendance: 19,500; Referee: Fröhlich

15 February 1992 24	Eintracht Frankfurt	1–2	1. FC Köln	Frankfurt, Germany
15:30 CEST	Falkenmayer 52'	(Report)	Giske 1'; Ordenewitz 44'	Stadium: Waldstadion; Attendance: 22,000; Referee: Schmidhuber

22 February 1992 25	1. FC Kaiserslautern	1–1	Eintracht Frankfurt	Kaiserslautern, Germany
15:30 CEST	Thomas Vogel 78'	(Report)	Andersen 23'	Stadium: Fritz-Walter-Stadion; Attendance: 38,500; Referee: Harder

29 February 1992 26	Eintracht Frankfurt	2–1	Hamburger SV	Frankfurt, Germany
15:30 CEST	Möller 14'; Andersen 59'	(Report)	Waas 66'	Stadium: Waldstadion; Attendance: 26,000; Referee: Prengel

7 March 1992 27	Stuttgarter Kickers	0–2	Eintracht Frankfurt	Stuttgart, Germany
15:30 CEST		(Report)	Möller 56'; Sippel 90'	Stadium: Neckarstadion; Attendance: 9,500; Referee: Aust

13 March 1992 28	1. FC Nürnberg	1–3	Eintracht Frankfurt	Nuremberg, Germany
20:00 CEST	Zárate 44'	(Report)	Yeboah 46'; Andersen 50'; Roth 90'	Stadium: Frankenstadion; Attendance: 49,000; Referee: Stenzel

21 March 1992 29	Eintracht Frankfurt	3–2	Bayern Munich	Frankfurt, Germany
15:30 CEST	Yeboah 25'; Möller 49'; Roth 64'	(Report)	Labbadia 37'; Thon 69'	Stadium: Waldstadion; Attendance: 60,500; Referee: Krug

28 March 1992 30	Borussia Dortmund	2–2	Eintracht Frankfurt	Dortmund, Germany
15:30 CEST	Zorc 10'; Poschner 50'	(Report)	Yeboah 4'; Falkenmayer 54'	Stadium: Westfalenstadion; Attendance: 52,500; Referee: Ziller

4 April 1992 31	Eintracht Frankfurt	1–1	VfB Stuttgart	Frankfurt, Germany
15:30 CEST	Sippel 58'	(Report)	Kastl 45'	Stadium: Waldstadion; Attendance: 47,000; Referee: Dellwing

11 April 1992 32	Borussia Mönchengladbach	1–1	Eintracht Frankfurt	Mönchengladbach, Germany
15:30 CEST	Criens 41'	(Report)	Sippel 62'	Stadium: Bökelbergstadion; Attendance: 28,500; Referee: Strampe

18 April 1992 33	Eintracht Frankfurt	1–1	SG Wattenscheid 09	Frankfurt, Germany
15:30 CEST	Binz 15'	(Report)	Tschiskale 83'	Stadium: Waldstadion; Attendance: 19,000; Referee: Föckler

25 April 1992 34	Bayer Leverkusen	1–3	Eintracht Frankfurt	Leverkusen, Germany
15:30 CEST	Jorginho 89'	(Report)	Möller 24'; Weber 69'; Falkenmayer 78'	Stadium: Ulrich-Haberland-Stadion; Attendance: 25,000; Referee: Berg

2 May 1992 35	Eintracht Frankfurt	3–0	MSV Duisburg	Frankfurt, Germany
15:30 CEST	Sippel 84', 86'; Yeboah 89'	(Report)		Stadium: Waldstadion; Attendance: 30,000; Referee: Gläser

5 May 1992 36	Karlsruher SC	0–2	Eintracht Frankfurt	Karlsruhe, Germany
20:00 CEST		(Report)	Yeboah 16'; Gründel 66'	Stadium: Wildparkstadion; Attendance: 28,000; Referee: Osmers

9 May 1992 37	Eintracht Frankfurt	2–2	Werder Bremen	Frankfurt, Germany
15:30 CEST	Möller 20'; Yeboah 82'	(Report)	Rufer 77'; Allofs 79'	Stadium: Waldstadion; Attendance: 46,000; Referee: Löwer

16 May 1992 38	Hansa Rostock	2–1	Eintracht Frankfurt	Rostock, Germany
15:30 CEST	Dowe 65'; Böger 89'	(Report)	Kruse 67'	Stadium: Ostseestadion; Attendance: 25,000; Referee: Berg

=== DFB-Pokal ===
1st Round	v	Eintracht Frankfurt
Note: Cup bye for the first round

17 August 1991 2nd Round	SpVgg Ludwigsburg	1–6	Eintracht Frankfurt
	Westphal 77'	(Report)	Klein 2'; Kruse 8', 38'; Bein 12', 56' (66), pen.'	Attendance: 7,000; Referee: Best

3 September 1991 3rd Round	Eintracht Frankfurt	0–1	Karlsruher SC	Frankfurt, Germany
20:00 CEST		(Report)	Harforth 79'	Stadium: Waldstadion; Attendance: 10,500; Referee: Führer

=== UEFA Cup ===
18 September 1991 1st Round	Eintracht Frankfurt	6–1	Spora Luxembourg	Frankfurt, Germany
20:00 CEST	Möller 9', 36'; Bein 14'; Gründel 32'; Yeboah 46', 54'	(Report)	Rigaud 39'	Stadium: Waldstadion; Attendance: 5,000; Referee: Agius

1 October 1991 1st Round	Spora Luxembourg	0–5	Eintracht Frankfurt	Luxembourg City, Luxembourg
20:00 CEST		(Report)	Kruse 33', 59'; Weber 44'; Schmitt 71'; Bein 90'	Stadium: Stade Municipal de Luxembourg; Attendance: 1,000; Referee: Olsen

22 October 1991 2nd Round	KAA Gent	0–0	Eintracht Frankfurt	Ghent, Belgium
19:00 CEST		(Report)		Stadium: Ottenstadion; Attendance: 8,000; Referee: Loizou

6 November 1991 2nd Round	Eintracht Frankfurt	0–1	KAA Gent	Frankfurt, Germany
18:00 CEST		(Report)	Vandenbergh 35'	Stadium: Waldstadion; Attendance: 12,000; Referee: Delmer

== Squad ==
=== Squad and statistics ===
No.	Pos	Nat	Player	Total		Bundesliga		DFB-Pokal		UEFA Cup	
No.	Pos	Nat	Player	Apps	Goals	Apps	Goals	Apps	Goals	Apps	Goals
	GK	(Germany) GER	Thomas Ernst	0	0	0	0	0	0	0	0
	GK	(Germany) GER	Uli Stein	44	0	38	0	2	0	4	0
	DF	(Germany) GER	Uwe Bindewald	42	0	36	0	2	0	4	0
	DF	(Germany) GER	Manfred Binz	44	1	38	1	2	0	4	0
	DF	(Germany) GER	~~Alexander Conrad~~	0	0	0	0	0	0	0	0
	DF	(Germany) GER	~~André Köhler~~	4	0	4	0	0	0	0	0
	DF	(Germany) GER	~~Norbert Nachtweih~~	6	0	3	0	1	0	2	0
	DF	(Germany) GER	Dietmar Roth	38	2	35	2	2	0	1	0
	DF	(Germany) GER	Stefan Studer	22	0	18	0	1	0	3	0
	DF	(Germany) GER	Ralf Weber	40	5	34	4	2	0	4	1
	MF	(Germany) GER	Uwe Bein	40	13	34	8	2	3	4	2
	MF	(Germany) GER	Ralf Falkenmayer	37	4	33	4	2	0	2	0
	MF	(Germany) GER	Heinz Gründel	18	2	14	1	1	0	3	1
	MF	(Germany) GER	Michael Klein	17	1	16	0	1	1	0	0
	MF	(Germany) GER	Thomas Lasser	11	0	6	0	2	0	3	0
	MF	(Germany) GER	Andreas Möller	43	14	37	12	2	0	4	2
	MF	(Germany) GER	Frank Möller	13	0	13	0	0	0	0	0
	MF	(Germany) GER	Dirk Wolf	9	0	9	0	0	0	0	0
	FW	(Norway) NOR	Jørn Andersen	26	9	26	9	0	0	0	0
	FW	(Germany) GER	Axel Kruse	18	9	14	5	2	2	2	2
	FW	(Germany) GER	Edgar Schmitt	11	1	7	0	1	0	3	1
	FW	(Germany) GER	Lothar Sippel	35	14	32	14	0	0	3	0
	FW	(Ghana) GHA	Tony Yeboah	38	17	34	15	1	0	3	2

== Sources ==
- Matheja, Ulrich (2011). Unsere Eintracht - Eintracht Frankfurt - Die Chronik. Die Werkstatt. ISBN 978-3-89533-750-5.
