= 1989–90 Eintracht Frankfurt season =

Eintracht Frankfurt
1989-90 season
- Chairman: Matthias Ohms
- Manager: Jörg Berger
- Bundesliga: 3rd
- DFB-Pokal: 1st Round
- Top goalscorer: League: Jørn Andersen (18); All: Jørn Andersen (18)
- Highest home attendance: 55,000 9 September 1989 v Bayern Munich (league)
- Lowest home attendance: 14,500 1 May 1990 v FC Homburg (league)
- Average home league attendance: 26,765
Home colours	Away colours

The 1989–90 Eintracht Frankfurt season was the 90th season in the club's football history. In 1989–90 the club played in the Bundesliga, the top tier of German football. It was the club's 27th season in the Bundesliga. Eintracht Frankfurt striker Jørn Andersen won the Bundesliga top goalscorer, as the first foreigner ever to win the artillery trophy.

== Matches ==
=== Legend ===
Win Draw Loss Postponed

=== Friendlies ===
9 July 1989	SV Erzhausen	1–17	Eintracht Frankfurt	Erzhausen, West Germany
16:00 CEST	Bott 58'	(Report)	Turowski; Falkenmayer; Andersen; Sippel; Bein; Eckstein; Gründel	Stadium: Sportplatz Heinrichstraße; Attendance: 1,000

12 July 1989	FC Kufstein	2–3	Eintracht Frankfurt	Kufstein, Austria
	Haßlacher 51'; Conrad 85' (o.g.)	(Report)	Gründel 23'; Eckstein 61'; Andersen 68'	Stadium: Grenzland-Stadion; Attendance: 1,000

13 July 1989	WSG Wattens	0–3	Eintracht Frankfurt	Wattens, Austria
		(Report)	Andersen 7', 21'; Bein 80' (pen.)	Attendance: 600

15 July 1989	SV Haiming	0–7	Eintracht Frankfurt	Austria
		(Report)	Sippel; Hobday; Gründel; Binz; Eckstein; Andersen	Attendance: 400

16 July 1989	FC Stätzling	1–10	Eintracht Frankfurt	Friedberg, West Germany
16:30 CEST	Neumann 18'	(Report)	Sippel 3'; Bein 8'; Andersen; Binz; Turowski	Stadium: Sportanlage des FC Stätzling an der St.-Anton-Straße; Attendance: 1,200; Referee: Kranzfelder

19 July 1989	DJK Bad Homburg	0–13	Eintracht Frankfurt	Bad Homburg, West Germany
		(Report)	Bein; Falkenmayer; Andersen; Turowski; Klein; Lasser	Attendance: 1,300

22 July 1989	FSV Frankfurt	1–3	Eintracht Frankfurt	Frankfurt, West Germany
16:00 CEST	Jessl 62'	(Report)	Turowski 57'; Andersen 66', 81'	Stadium: Stadion am Bornheimer Hang; Attendance: 3,000; Referee: Bastian

25 July 1989	SC Freiburg	0–5	Eintracht Frankfurt	West Germany
		(Report)	Eckstein 54', 69'; Bein 56'; Andersen 65'; Falkenmayer 80'	Attendance: 1,700

12 September 1989	Seemenbach XI	0–5	Eintracht Frankfurt	Büdingen, West Germany
		(Report)	Falkenmayer; Andersen; Conrad; Lasser; Weber	Attendance: 2,000

22 September 1989	Sportfreunde Schwalbach	1–9	Eintracht Frankfurt	Schwalbach, West Germany
18:00 CEST	Gehrke 43' (pen.)	(Report)	Eckstein 26', 36'; Falkenmayer 35'; Turowski 50', 54', 76'; Bakalorz 61'; Sippel 64', 68'	Stadium: Stadion Limes; Attendance: 1,500

12 November 1989	Viktoria Urberach	0–8	Eintracht Frankfurt	Rödermark, West Germany
11:00 CEST		(Report)	Sievers 45'; Eckstein 51'; Falkenmayer 53', 68'; Turowski 55', 75'; Sippel 57'; Bakalorz 73'	Stadium: Waldsportplatz Traminer Straße; Attendance: 1,200; Referee: Müller

24 January 1990	SC Farense	0–2	Eintracht Frankfurt	Faro, Portugal
		(Report)	Andersen 76'; Turowski 77'	Attendance: 200

25 January 1990	Silves FC	1–3	Eintracht Frankfurt	Portugal
	Baba 35'	(Report)	Bein 2'; Weiß 30'; Eckstein 73'	Attendance: 200

31 January 1990	TuS Diez	1–9	Eintracht Frankfurt	West Germany
	Goal	(Report)	Bein; Roth; Eckstein; Andersen; Turowski; Binz; Weiß; o.g.'	Attendance: 1,500

3 February 1990	Wormatia Worms	1–4	Eintracht Frankfurt	West Germany
	Arthur 47'	(Report)	Sippel 11'; Eckstein 36'; Binz 62'; Bein 64'	Attendance: 1,300; Referee: Weber

7 February 1990	SG Hoechst	3–3	Eintracht Frankfurt	Frankfurt, West Germany
	Komljenović; Rubeck; Scheier	(Report)	Sippel; Weiß	Stadium: Stadion am Stadtpark

10 February 1990	SpVgg Bad Homburg	2–3	Eintracht Frankfurt	West Germany
	Goal	(Report)	Turowski; Binz	Attendance: 2,000

13 February 1990	Hassia Bingen	0–5	Eintracht Frankfurt	West Germany
		(Report)	Binz 9', 24'; Körbel 17'; Bein 19', 87'	Attendance: 600

18 February 1990	Eintracht Frankfurt	3–0	Rot-Weiß Erfurt	West Germany
	Gründel; Sippel; Eckstein	(Report)		Attendance: 4,100

15 May 1990	TSF Heuchelheim	0–9	Eintracht Frankfurt	West Germany
		(Report)	Falkenmayer; Turowski; Sippel; Binz; Gründel; Andersen	Attendance: 2,500

17 May 1990	Marburg XI	1–11	Eintracht Frankfurt	Gladenbach, West Germany
	Goal	(Report)	Andersen; Turowski; Falkenmayer; Sippel; Weiß; Klein	Attendance: 2,800

19 May 1990	SC Eckenheim	0–6	Eintracht Frankfurt	Frankfurt, West Germany
		(Report)	Andersen 8' (pen.), 20'; Bakalorz 31'; Eckstein 69', 83'; Klein 86'	Attendance: 800; Referee: Bastian

24 May 1990	Lüneburg XI	0–4	Eintracht Frankfurt	Neetze, West Germany
		(Report)	Andersen 3', 40'; Sippel 39'; Turowski 79'	Attendance: 2,000

25 May 1990	Harburger TB	2–10	Eintracht Frankfurt	Hamburg, West Germany
18:30 CEST	Goal	(Report)	Eckstein; Andersen; Turowski; Lasser; Sievers; Sippel; Bakalorz; Falkenmayer

12 July 1990	Wacker Nordhausen/SV Südharz	0–3	Eintracht Frankfurt	Nordhausen, East Germany
16:00 CEST		(Report)	Eckstein 18', 65'; Turowski 28'	Stadium: Albert-Kuntz-Sportpark; Attendance: 3,500; Referee: Demme

=== Indoor soccer tournament ===
Win Draw Loss

17 December 1989 First match	Dynamo Kyiv	1–1	Eintracht Frankfurt	Linz, Austria
	Matushenkov	(Report)	Turowski

17 December 1989 Second match	Vorwärts Steyr	2–6	Eintracht Frankfurt	Linz, Austria
	Goal	(Report)	Bein; Turowski; Falkenmayer; Binz; Sippel

18 December 1989 Third match	Dynamo Kyiv	4–2	Eintracht Frankfurt	Linz, Austria
	Goal	(Report)	Goal

18 December 1989 Fourth match	Vorwärts Steyr	0–0	Eintracht Frankfurt	Linz, Austria
		(Report)

19 December 1989 Semi-Final	VÖEST Linz	1–4	Eintracht Frankfurt	Linz, Austria
	Zellhofer	(Report)	Turowski; Bein; Binz

19 December 1989 Final	Dynamo Kyiv	2–3	Eintracht Frankfurt	Linz, Austria
	Shmatochenko; Protasov	(Report)	Bein; Studer

=== Bundesliga ===
==== League table ====
Pos	Team	Pld	W	D	L	GF	GA	GD	Pts	Qualification or relegation
1	Bayern Munich (C)	34	19	11	4	64	28	+36	49	Qualification to European Cup first round
2	1. FC Köln	34	17	9	8	54	44	+10	43	Qualification to UEFA Cup first round
3	Eintracht Frankfurt	34	15	11	8	61	40	+21	41	Qualification to UEFA Cup first round
4	Borussia Dortmund	34	15	11	8	51	35	+16	41	Qualification to UEFA Cup first round
5	Bayer Leverkusen	34	12	15	7	40	32	+8	39	Qualification to UEFA Cup first round

Source: www.dfb.de
Rules for classification: 1) points; 2) goal difference; 3) number of goals scored.
(C) Champions

==== League fixtures and results ====
29 July 1989 1	Eintracht Frankfurt	3–1	Waldhof Mannheim	Frankfurt, West Germany
15:30 CEST	Andersen 2'; Hobday 59'; Eckstein 70'	(Report)	Freiler 45'	Stadium: Waldstadion; Attendance: 24,000; Referee: Kriegelstein

4 August 1989 2	Hamburger SV	1–1	Eintracht Frankfurt	Hamburg, West Germany
20:00 CEST	Jusufi 62'	(Report)	Andersen 14'	Stadium: Volksparkstadion; Attendance: 15,500; Referee: Weber

8 August 1989 3	Fortuna Düsseldorf	1–2	Eintracht Frankfurt	Düsseldorf, West Germany
20:00 CEST	Büskens 79'	(Report)	Andersen 15'; Binz 90'	Stadium: Rheinstadion; Attendance: 12,000; Referee: Wiesel

16 August 1989 4	Eintracht Frankfurt	4–0	VfL Bochum	Frankfurt, West Germany
20:00 CEST	Gründel 19'; Turowski 30', 57'; Andersen 64'	(Report)		Stadium: Waldstadion; Attendance: 25,000; Referee: Barnick

23 August 1989 5	VfB Stuttgart	1–1	Eintracht Frankfurt	Stuttgart, West Germany
20:00 CEST	Kastl 7'	(Report)	Falkenmayer 66' (pen.)	Stadium: Neckarstadion; Attendance: 31,000; Referee: Krug

26 August 1989 6	Eintracht Frankfurt	2–1	Bayer Uerdingen	Frankfurt, West Germany
15:30 CEST	Weber 87'; Sippel 89'	(Report)	Bartram 72'	Stadium: Waldstadion; Attendance: 19,000; Referee: Dellwing

2 September 1989 7	1. FC Kaiserslautern	2–1	Eintracht Frankfurt	Kaiserslautern, West Germany
15:30 CEST	Kuntz 19' (pen.), 48'	(Report)	Binz 89'	Stadium: Fritz-Walter-Stadion; Attendance: 25,500; Referee: Löwer

9 September 1989 8	Eintracht Frankfurt	1–2	Bayern Munich	Frankfurt, West Germany
15:30 CEST	Bein 55'	(Report)	McInally 35'; Wohlfahrt 80'	Stadium: Waldstadion; Attendance: 55,000; Referee: Merk

15 September 1989 9	Bayer Leverkusen	2–0	Eintracht Frankfurt	Leverkusen, West Germany
20:00 CEST	Leśniak 6'; Demandt 22'	(Report)		Stadium: Ulrich-Haberland-Stadion; Attendance: 12,000; Referee: Osmers

19 September 1989 10	Eintracht Frankfurt	4–1	FC St. Pauli	Frankfurt, West Germany
20:00 CEST	Sippel 5'; Weber 17'; Falkenmayer 39'; Andersen 70' (pen.)	(Report)	Golke 64'	Stadium: Waldstadion; Attendance: 18,000; Referee: Pauly

30 September 1989 11	Werder Bremen	1–2	Eintracht Frankfurt	Bremen, West Germany
15:30 CEST	Hermann 82'; Bratseth (red card) 89'	(Report)	Bein 27'; Studer 64'	Stadium: Weserstadion; Attendance: 16,000; Referee: Dardenne

7 October 1989 12	Eintracht Frankfurt	0–2	Borussia Dortmund	Frankfurt, West Germany
15:30 CEST		(Report)	Zorc 3', 90' (pen.)	Stadium: Waldstadion; Attendance: 30,000; Referee: Albrecht

14 October 1989 13	1. FC Nürnberg	1–1	Eintracht Frankfurt	Nuremberg, West Germany
15:30 CEST	Wirsching 14'	(Report)	Andersen 75'	Stadium: Städtisches Stadion; Attendance: 32,000; Referee: Heitmann

21 October 1989 14	Eintracht Frankfurt	3–0	Borussia Mönchengladbach	Frankfurt, West Germany
15:30 CEST	Andersen 72'; Eckstein 83'; Bein 89'	(Report)		Stadium: Waldstadion; Attendance: 27,000; Referee: Tritschler

28 October 1989 15	FC Homburg	2–3	Eintracht Frankfurt	Waldstadion
15:00 CEST	Dittmer 52', 74'	(Report)	Wohlert 56' (og.); Bein 63'; Falkenmayer 88'	Stadium: Homburg; Attendance: 8,000; Referee: Kentsch

4 November 1989 16	Eintracht Frankfurt	1–1	Karlsruher SC	Frankfurt, West Germany
15:30 CEST	Andersen 19'	(Report)	Hermann 47'	Stadium: Waldstadion; Attendance: 21,000; Referee: Richmann

18 November 1989 17	1. FC Köln	3–5	Eintracht Frankfurt	Cologne, West Germany
15:30 CEST	Häßler 10'; Rahn 24'; Littbarski 64'	(Report)	Eckstein 7', 12', 90'; Falkenmayer 50'; Andersen 62'	Stadium: Müngersdorfer Stadion; Attendance: 31,000; Referee: Föckler

25 November 1989 18	Waldhof Mannheim	1–1	Eintracht Frankfurt	Mannheim, West Germany
14:15 CEST	Freiler 54'	(Report)	Turowski 15'	Stadium: Waldhof-Stadion; Attendance: 15,500; Referee: Assenmacher

2 December 1989 19	Eintracht Frankfurt	2–0	Hamburger SV	Frankfurt, West Germany
15:30 CEST	Bein 17'; Falkenmayer 78'	(Report)		Stadium: Waldstadion; Attendance: 23,000; Referee: Broska

9 December 1989 20	Eintracht Frankfurt	2–0	Fortuna Düsseldorf	Frankfurt, West Germany
15:30 CEST	Bein 48'; Falkenmayer 82'	(Report)		Stadium: Waldstadion; Attendance: 20,000; Referee: Osmers

14 December 1989 21	VfL Bochum	2–2	Eintracht Frankfurt	Bochum, West Germany
20:15 CEST	Nehl 49'; Rzehaczek 51'	(Report)	Andersen 15'; Körbel 27'	Stadium: Ruhrstadion; Attendance: 20,500; Referee: Dellwing

24 February 1990 22	Eintracht Frankfurt	5–1	VfB Stuttgart	Frankfurt, West Germany
15:30 CEST	Andersen 27', 53'; Studer 65'; Eckstein 66', 75'	(Report)	Walter 52'	Stadium: Waldstadion; Attendance: 35,500; Referee: Steinborn

3 March 1990 23	Bayer Uerdingen	1–1	Eintracht Frankfurt	Krefeld, West Germany
15:30 CEST	Steffen 62'	(Report)	Roth 63'	Stadium: Grotenburg-Stadion; Attendance: 10,000; Referee: Kriegelstein

10 March 1990 24	Eintracht Frankfurt	1–1	1. FC Kaiserslautern	Frankfurt, West Germany
15:30 CEST	Andersen 55' (pen.)	(Report)	Hotić 39'	Stadium: Waldstadion; Attendance: 28,000; Referee: Heitmann

17 March 1990 25	Bayern Munich	1–0	Eintracht Frankfurt	Munich, West Germany
15:30 CEST	Strunz 58'	(Report)		Stadium: Olympiastadion; Attendance: 70,000; Referee: Pauly

23 March 1990 26	Eintracht Frankfurt	0–3	Bayer Leverkusen	Frankfurt, West Germany
20:00 CEST		(Report)	Leśniak 57'; Jorginho 64'; Thom 90'	Stadium: Waldstadion; Attendance: 35,000; Referee: Föckler

31 March 1990 27	FC St. Pauli	2–2	Eintracht Frankfurt	Hamburg, West Germany
15:30 CEST	Klaus Ottens 24' (pen.), 50'	(Report)	Andersen 35'; Bein 60'	Stadium: Wilhelm-Koch-Stadion; Attendance: 20,500; Referee: Berg

7 April 1990 28	Eintracht Frankfurt	1–0	Werder Bremen	Frankfurt, West Germany
15:30 CEST	Andersen 57'	(Report)		Stadium: Waldstadion; Attendance: 25,000; Referee: Weber

11 April 1990 29	Borussia Dortmund	0–0	Eintracht Frankfurt	Dortmund, West Germany
20:15 CEST		(Report)		Stadium: Westfalenstadion; Attendance: 40,500; Referee: Osmers

21 April 1990 30	Eintracht Frankfurt	5–1	1. FC Nürnberg	Frankfurt, West Germany
15:30 CEST	Gründel 15', 79'; Bein 39'; Andersen 46', 82'	(Report)	Metschies 26'	Stadium: Waldstadion; Attendance: 23,000; Referee: Neuner

28 April 1990 31	Borussia Mönchengladbach	2–1	Eintracht Frankfurt	Mönchengladbach, West Germany
15:30 CEST	Criens 8'; Spies 74'	(Report)	Klinkert 84' (o.g.)	Stadium: Bökelbergstadion; Attendance: 22,000; Referee: Harder

1 May 1990 32	Eintracht Frankfurt	1–1	FC Homburg	Frankfurt, West Germany
20:00 CEST	Binz 59'	(Report)	Westerbeek 15'	Stadium: Waldstadion; Attendance: 14,500; Referee: Rubel

5 May 1990 33	Karlsruher SC	1–0	Eintracht Frankfurt	Karlsruhe, West Germany
15:30 CEST	Carl 73'	(Report)		Stadium: Wildparkstadion; Attendance: 20,500; Referee: Pauly

12 May 1990 34	Eintracht Frankfurt	3–1	1. FC Köln	Frankfurt, West Germany
15:30 CEST	Bein 77'; Binz 88'; Andersen 90'	(Report)	Götz 29'	Stadium: Waldstadion; Attendance: 32,000; Referee: Albrecht

=== DFB-Pokal ===
19 August 1989 1st Round	Eintracht Frankfurt	0–1	Bayern Munich	Frankfurt, West Germany
		(Report)	Augenthaler 34'	Stadium: Waldstadion; Attendance: 48,500; Referee: Strigel

== Squad ==
=== Squad and statistics ===
No.	Pos	Nat	Player	Total		Bundesliga		DFB-Pokal	
No.	Pos	Nat	Player	Apps	Goals	Apps	Goals	Apps	Goals
	GK	(West Germany) FRG	Thomas Ernst	0	0	0	0	0	0
	GK	(West Germany) FRG	Uli Stein	35	0	34	0	1	0
	DF	(West Germany) FRG	Uwe Bindewald	20	0	20	0	0	0
	DF	(West Germany) FRG	Manfred Binz	35	4	34	4	1	0
	DF	(West Germany) FRG	Alexander Conrad	1	0	1	0	0	0
	DF	(West Germany) FRG	Michael Klein	12	0	12	0	0	0
	DF	(West Germany) FRG	Thomas Klepper	1	0	1	0	0	0
	DF	(West Germany) FRG	Charly Körbel	35	1	34	1	1	0
	DF	(West Germany) FRG	Dietmar Roth	27	1	26	1	1	0
	DF	(West Germany) FRG	Stefan Studer	34	2	33	2	1	0
	MF	(West Germany) FRG	Dirk Bakalorz	5	0	5	0	0	0
	MF	(West Germany) FRG	Uwe Bein	34	9	33	9	1	0
	MF	(West Germany) FRG	Ralf Falkenmayer	34	6	33	6	1	0
	MF	(West Germany) FRG	Heinz Gründel	24	3	23	3	1	0
	MF	(England) ENG	Peter Hobday	2	1	2	1	0	0
	MF	(West Germany) FRG	Thomas Lasser	11	0	11	0	0	0
	MF	(West Germany) FRG	Ralf Sievers	24	0	23	0	1	0
	MF	(West Germany) FRG	Ralf Weber	19	2	18	2	1	0
	FW	(Norway) NOR	Jørn Andersen	35	18	34	18	1	0
	FW	(West Germany) FRG	Dieter Eckstein	28	7	28	7	0	0
	FW	(West Germany) FRG	Lothar Sippel	18	2	18	2	0	0
	FW	(Poland) POL	Janusz Turowski	17	3	16	3	1	0

== Sources ==
- Matheja, Ulrich (2011). Unsere Eintracht - Eintracht Frankfurt - Die Chronik. Die Werkstatt. ISBN 978-3-89533-750-5.
