= 1992–93 Eintracht Frankfurt season =

Eintracht Frankfurt
1992-93 season
- Chairman: Matthias Ohms
- Manager: Dragoslav Stepanović (sacked 30 March 1993); Horst Heese (signed 31 March 1993)
- Bundesliga: 3rd
- DFB-Pokal: Semi-finals
- UEFA Cup: Second round
- Top goalscorer: League: Tony Yeboah (20) (Note: The goals scored during the protested match at Uerdingen are included.); All: Tony Yeboah (30)
- Highest home attendance: 59,000 27 October 1992 v Bayern Munich (league)
- Lowest home attendance: 12,500 28 November 1992 v Bayer Uerdingen (league)
- Average home league attendance: 25,382
Home colours	Away colours

The 1992–93 Eintracht Frankfurt season was the 93rd season in the club's football history. In 1992–93 the club played in the Bundesliga, the top tier of German football. It was the club's 30th season in the Bundesliga. Eintracht Frankfurt striker Tony Yeboah won the Bundesliga top goalscorer and scored, like Leverkusen's Ulf Kirsten, 20 Bundesliga goals.

== Friendlies ==
Win Draw Loss

8 July 1992	FSV Mainz 05	4–0	Eintracht Frankfurt
	Goal	(Report)		Attendance: 2,500

11 July 1992	FV Malsch 1910	1–5	Eintracht Frankfurt
	Goal	(Report)	Schmitt; Gründel; Rahn; Klein	Attendance: 2,000

12 July 1992	Racing Strasbourg	2–2	Eintracht Frankfurt	Schutterwald, Germany
	Goal	(Report)	Goal	Attendance: 4,000

15 July 1992	Trabzonspor	0–0	Eintracht Frankfurt	Paderborn, Germany
19:30 CEST		(Report)		Stadium: Hermann-Löns-Stadion; Attendance: 6,000

18 July 1992	Büdingen XI	0–6	Eintracht Frankfurt	Gedern, Germany
		(Report)	Bein; Schmitt; Andersen; Wolf; Kruse	Attendance: 3,000

19 July 1992	KSV Reichelsheim	0–18	Eintracht Frankfurt
		(Report)	Andersen; Schmitt; Gründel; Kruse; Yeboah; Klein; Binz	Attendance: 2,000

21 July 1992 Fuji-Cup; Semi-Final	VfB Stuttgart	0–2	Eintracht Frankfurt	Worms, Germany
19:15 CEST		(Report)	Bein	Attendance: 6,000

23 July 1992 Fuji-Cup; Final	1. FC Kaiserslautern	1–1 (3–5 p)	Eintracht Frankfurt	Trier, Germany
	Goal	(Report)	Kruse	Stadium: Moselstadion; Attendance: 12,000
	Penalties
			(penalty scored) Wolf; (penalty scored) Binz; (penalty scored) Falkenmayer; (penalty scored) Stein; (penalty scored) Bein

26 July 1992	Nidder valley XI	2–16	Eintracht Frankfurt	Altenstadt
16:00 CEST	Goal	(Report)	Yeboah; Kruse; Bein; Wolf; Falkenmayer; Gründel; Andersen	Attendance: 2,000
Note: Eintracht fielded a mixed team of first team and reserves

26 July 1992	SpVgg Neu-Isenburg	1–4	Eintracht Frankfurt
	Belke	(Report)	Yeboah; Becker; Okocha; Reis	Attendance: 1,000
Note: Eintracht fielded a mixed team of first team and reserves

29 July 1992	FC Epfendorf/SC Rottweil	0–13	Eintracht Frankfurt
		(Report)	Yeboah; Andersen; Bein; Binz; Falkenmayer; Klein; Schmitt; Kruse	Attendance: 2,500

3 August 1992	Yomiuri FC	1–3	Eintracht Frankfurt	Tokyo, Japan
		(Report)	Kruse; Yeboah; Reis	Attendance: 55,000

7 August 1992	VfB Leimen	1–7	Eintracht Frankfurt
	Goal	(Report)	Yeboah; Bommer; Kruse; Schmitt; Klein; Weber; Andersen	Attendance: 1,500

8 August 1992	1. FC Köln	0–0	Eintracht Frankfurt	Fulda, Germany
		(Report)		Attendance: 4,000; Referee: Kiefer

25 August 1992	SKG Bad Homburg	0–8	Eintracht Frankfurt
		(Report)	Andersen; Schmitt	Attendance: 800

22 September 1992	SSV Heilsberg	0–16	Eintracht Frankfurt
		(Report)	Schmitt; Andersen; Rahn; Reis; Balser; Binz; Yeboah; Okocha; Ernst	Attendance: 500

23 September 1992	VfB Unterliederbach	1–3	Eintracht Frankfurt
	Goal	(Report)	Rahn; Andersen; Schmitt	Attendance: 1,000

13 January 1993 Torneo internacional de fútbol de Maspalomas; Semi-Final	Fortuna Düsseldorf	0–2	Eintracht Frankfurt	Maspalomas, Spain
		(Report)	Weber 49'; Bein 63' (pen.)	Attendance: 2,000

15 January 1993 Torneo internacional de fútbol de Maspalomas; Final	IFK Göteborg	3–2	Eintracht Frankfurt	Maspalomas, Spain
	Ekström 25', 65', 88'	(Report)	Schmitt 70'; Bein 85'	Attendance: 4,500

27 January 1993	SV Darmstadt 98	4–4	Eintracht Frankfurt	Darmstadt, Germany
	Hartenberger 31', 57'; Wörsdörfer 79'; Băban 81'	(Report)	Roth 20'; Bindewald 29'; Aničić 62'; Andersen 73'	Stadium: Stadion am Böllenfalltor; Attendance: 2,500; Referee: Welz

3 February 1993	CDR Quarteirense	0–2	Eintracht Frankfurt	Portugal
		(Report)	Alessandro da Silva 47'; Kruse 55'
Note: 40 minutes each half-time

5 February 1993	Borussia Mönchengladbach	1–1	Eintracht Frankfurt	Portugal
	Pflipsen 22'	(Report)	Binz 40'	Referee: Hammans/Friese
Note: 30 minutes each half-time

== Indoor soccer tournaments ==
=== Beck's-Cup ===
9 January 1993 First match	Dynamo Dresden	3–4	Eintracht Frankfurt	Leipzig, Germany
	Maucksch; Kmetsch; Jähnig	(Report)	Okocha; Bein	Stadium: Leipzig Trade Fair; Attendance: 7,000

9 January 1993 Second match	1. FC Nürnberg	3–2	Eintracht Frankfurt	Leipzig, Germany
	Kramny; Weissenberger; Zietsch	(Report)	Yeboah	Stadium: Leipzig Trade Fair; Attendance: 7,000

9 January 1993 Semi-Final	Sachsen Leipzig	3–5	Eintracht Frankfurt	Leipzig, Germany
	Baum; Pinder; König	(Report)	Binz; Penksa; Bein; Adamczuk	Stadium: Leipzig Trade Fair; Attendance: 7,000

9 January 1993 Final	Eintracht Frankfurt	5–1	Sigma Olomouc	Leipzig, Germany
	Studer; Okocha; Yeboah; Bein	(Report)	Šindelář	Stadium: Leipzig Trade Fair; Attendance: 7,000

== Competitions ==
Win Draw Loss

=== Bundesliga ===
==== League table ====
Pos	Team	Pld	W	D	L	GF	GA	GD	Pts	Qualification or relegation
1	Werder Bremen (C)	34	19	10	5	63	30	+33	48	Qualification to Champions League first round
2	Bayern Munich	34	18	11	5	74	45	+29	47	Qualification to UEFA Cup first round
3	Eintracht Frankfurt	34	15	12	7	56	39	+17	42	Qualification to UEFA Cup first round
4	Borussia Dortmund	34	18	5	11	61	43	+18	41	Qualification to UEFA Cup first round
5	Bayer Leverkusen	34	14	12	8	64	45	+19	40	Qualification to Cup Winners' Cup first round

Source: www.dfb.de
Rules for classification: 1) points; 2) goal difference; 3) number of goals scored.
(C) Champions

==== Results by round ====
Round	1	2	3	4	5	6	7	8	9	10	11	12	13	14	15	16	17	18	19	20	21	22	23	24	25	26	27	28	29	30	31	32	33	34
Ground	H	A	H	A	H	A	H	A	H	A	H	A	H	A	H	A	H	A	H	A	H	A	H	A	H	A	H	A	H	A	H	A	H	A
Result	D	W	D	W	W	D	D	D	W	W	D	L	W	D	W	W	D	W	W	L	W	L	L	D	W	D	D	D	W	L	L	L	W	W
Position	8	5	7	3	2	3	3	3	2	2	2	4	2	2	2	2	2	2	2	3	2	3	3	4	3	3	4	4	4	4	4	4	4	3

Source: kicker.de
A = Away; H = Home; W = Win; D = Draw; L = Loss

==== Matches ====
15 August 1992 1	Eintracht Frankfurt	1–1	Dynamo Dresden	Frankfurt, Germany
15:30 CEST	Binz 60'	(Report)	Zander 19'	Stadium: Waldstadion; Attendance: 21,000; Referee: Wippermann

22 August 1992 2	1. FC Köln	0–1	Eintracht Frankfurt	Cologne, Germany
15:30 CEST		(Report)	Yeboah 43'	Stadium: Müngersdorfer Stadion; Attendance: 28,000; Referee: Heynemann

29 August 1992 4	SG Wattenscheid 09	1–2	Eintracht Frankfurt	Bochum, Germany
15:30 CEST	Leśniak 28'	(Report)	Bein 56'; Kruse 78'	Stadium: Lohrheidestadion; Attendance: 6,000; Referee: Theobald

1 September 1992 5	Eintracht Frankfurt	4–1	Borussia Dortmund	Frankfurt, Germany
20:00 CEST	Yeboah 22', 85'; Bein 46' (pen.); Studer 74'	(Report)	Povlsen 30'	Stadium: Waldstadion; Attendance: 34,000; Referee: Manfred Amerell

4 September 1992 6	Borussia Mönchengladbach	3–3	Eintracht Frankfurt	Mönchengladbach, Germany
20:00 CEST	Nielsen 21' (pen.); Criens 64'; Wynhoff 90'	(Report)	Kruse 7'; Yeboah 38', 53'	Stadium: Bökelbergstadion; Attendance: 18,000; Referee: Fröhlich

19 September 1992 7	Eintracht Frankfurt	1–1	1. FC Saarbrücken	Frankfurt, Germany
15:30 CEST	Kruse 42'	(Report)	Roth 90' (o.g.)	Stadium: Waldstadion; Attendance: 19,000; Referee: Aust

26 September 1992 8	Werder Bremen	0–0	Eintracht Frankfurt	Bremen, Germany
15:30 CEST		(Report)		Stadium: Weserstadion; Attendance: 21,000; Referee: Führer

4 October 1992 9	Eintracht Frankfurt	4–0	VfB Stuttgart	Frankfurt, Germany
20:00 CEST	Yeboah 33', 61'; Kruse 64'; Studer 80'	(Report)		Stadium: Waldstadion; Attendance: 28,000; Referee: Schmidhuber

17 October 1992 10	1. FC Nürnberg	1–2	Eintracht Frankfurt	Nuremberg, Germany
15:30 CEST	Olivares 26'	(Report)	Bein 22', 27'	Stadium: Frankenstadion; Attendance: 43,000; Referee: Assenmacher

24 October 1992 11	Eintracht Frankfurt	2–2	Bayer Leverkusen	Frankfurt, Germany
15:30 CEST	Schmitt 44'; Rahn 45'	(Report)	Kirsten 10'; Kree 21'	Stadium: Waldstadion; Attendance: 20,000; Referee: Malbranc

27 October 1992 3	Eintracht Frankfurt	1–1	Bayern Munich	Frankfurt, Germany
20:00 CEST	Bommer 45'	(Report)	Kreuzer 50'	Stadium: Waldstadion; Attendance: 59,000; Referee: Habermann

1 November 1992 12	Karlsruher SC	4–1	Eintracht Frankfurt	Karlsruhe, Germany
18:00 CEST	Kiriakov 29'; Krieg 61'; Bender 68', 90' (pen.)	(Report)	Nowotny 10' (o.g.)	Stadium: Wildparkstadion; Attendance: 33,000; Referee: Weber

14 November 1992 13	Eintracht Frankfurt	4–1	VfL Bochum	Frankfurt, Germany
15:30 CEST	Bein 11' (pen.); Yeboah 68', 75'; Schmitt 88'	(Report)	Wegmann 29'	Stadium: Waldstadion; Attendance: 15,000; Referee: Osmers

21 November 1992 14	FC Schalke 04	0–0	Eintracht Frankfurt	Gelsenkirchen, Germany
15:30 CEST		(Report)		Stadium: Parkstadion; Attendance: 51,500; Referee: Weber

28 November 1992 15	Eintracht Frankfurt	1–0	Bayer Uerdingen	Frankfurt, Germany
15:30 CEST	Schmitt 18'	(Report)		Stadium: Waldstadion; Attendance: 12,500; Referee: Ziller

5 December 1992 16	1. FC Kaiserslautern	0–2	Eintracht Frankfurt	Kaiserslautern, Germany
15:30 CEST		(Report)	Rahn 36'; Roth 88'	Stadium: Fritz-Walter-Stadion; Attendance: 38,000; Referee: Kasper

12 December 1992 17	Eintracht Frankfurt	3–3	Hamburger SV	Frankfurt, Germany
15:30 CEST	Yeboah 10'; Rahn 14'; Okocha 38'	(Report)	Rohde 25'; Spies 66'; von Heesen 68'	Stadium: Waldstadion; Attendance: 29,000; Referee: Dardenne

20 February 1993 18	Dynamo Dresden	0–2	Eintracht Frankfurt	Dresden, Germany
15:30 CEST		(Report)	Schmitt 53'; Okocha 76'	Stadium: Rudolf-Harbig-Stadion; Attendance: 13,500; Referee: Strampe

27 February 1993 19	Eintracht Frankfurt	2–1	1. FC Köln	Frankfurt, Germany
15:30 CEST	Bein 30'; Schmitt 45'	(Report)	Rudy 87'	Stadium: Waldstadion; Attendance: 22,000; Referee: Dellwing

6 March 1993 20	Bayern Munich	1–0	Eintracht Frankfurt	Munich, Germany
15:30 CEST	Matthäus 28'	(Report)		Stadium: Olympiastadion; Attendance: 63,000; Referee: Strigel

13 March 1993 21	Eintracht Frankfurt	4–1	SG Wattenscheid 09	Frankfurt, Germany
15:30 CEST	Andersen 4', 58'; Schmitt 14', 82'	(Report)	Fink 39'	Stadium: Waldstadion; Attendance: 18,000; Referee: Fröhlich

21 March 1993 22	Borussia Dortmund	3–0	Eintracht Frankfurt	Dortmund, Germany
15:30 CEST	Zorc 77'; Falkenmayer , 86' (o.g.); Chapuisat 90'	(Report)	Roth (red card) 70'	Stadium: Westfalenstadion; Attendance: 29,000; Referee: Steinborn

27 March 1993 23	Eintracht Frankfurt	1–3	Borussia Mönchengladbach	Frankfurt, Germany
15:30 CEST	Schmitt 62'	(Report)	Dahlin 52'; Klinkert 56'; Kastenmaier 87'	Stadium: Waldstadion; Attendance: 26,000; Referee: Hermann Albrecht

2 April 1993 24	1. FC Saarbrücken	0–0	Eintracht Frankfurt	Saarbrücken, Germany
19:30 CEST		(Report)	Weber (yellow card) (yellow-red card) 37'	Stadium: Ludwigsparkstadion; Attendance: 29,000; Referee: Führer

10 April 1993 25	Eintracht Frankfurt	3–0	Werder Bremen	Frankfurt, Germany
15:30 CEST	Schmitt 45'; Yeboah 76'; Bommer 90'	(Report)		Stadium: Waldstadion; Attendance: 36,000; Referee: Krug

17 April 1993 26	VfB Stuttgart	2–2	Eintracht Frankfurt	Stuttgart, Germany
15:30 CEST	Walter 8'; Kienle 88'	(Report)	Schmitt (red card); Kruse 18' (pen.); Yeboah 48'	Stadium: Neckarstadion; Attendance: 32,000; Referee: Manfred Amerell

24 April 1993 27	Eintracht Frankfurt	0–0	1. FC Nürnberg	Frankfurt, Germany
15:30 CEST		(Report)		Stadium: Waldstadion; Attendance: 26,000; Referee: Weber

27 April 1993 28	Bayer Leverkusen	1–1	Eintracht Frankfurt	Leverkusen, Germany
20:00 CEST	Hoffmann 13'	(Report)	Yeboah 65'	Stadium: Ulrich-Haberland-Stadion; Attendance: 15,000; Referee: Ziller

30 April 1993 29	Eintracht Frankfurt	4–1	Karlsruher SC	Frankfurt, Germany
15:30 CEST	Yeboah 4'; Kruse 18'; Bein 41' (pen.); Weber 81'	(Report)	Rolff 65'	Stadium: Waldstadion; Attendance: 19,000; Referee: Assenmacher

8 May 1993 30	VfL Bochum	1–0	Eintracht Frankfurt	Bochum, Germany
15:30 CEST	Wegmann 56'	(Report)	Yeboah (yellow card) 75' (yellow-red card)	Stadium: Ruhrstadion; Attendance: 26,000; Referee: Dellwing

15 May 1993 31	Eintracht Frankfurt	0–3	FC Schalke 04	Frankfurt, Germany
15:30 CEST		(Report)	Sendscheid 73'; Büskens 78'; Mihajlović 90'	Stadium: Waldstadion; Attendance: 24,000; Referee: Heynemann

22 May 1993 32	Bayer Uerdingen	2–5 (2–0 after protest)	Eintracht Frankfurt	Krefeld, Germany
15:30 CEST	Walz 25'; Jüptner 48'	(Report)	Yeboah 3', 34', 53', 85'; Aničić 36'	Stadium: Grotenburg-Stadion; Attendance: 6,000; Referee: Wiesel
Note: In the 21st minute Eintracht's manager Horst Heese substituted the Slovak Marek Penksa for Slobodan Komljenović who was born in Germany. Together with Okocha, Tskhadadze and Yeboah four foreign players were fielded, one more than the German FA regulations allowed back then. Heese noticed his fault and replaced Penksa after four minutes. However the match was evaluated as 2–0 with points and 2–0 goals in favour of Bayer 05 Uerdingen.

29 May 1993 33	Eintracht Frankfurt	3–0	1. FC Kaiserslautern	Frankfurt, Germany
15:30 CEST	Binz 17'; Bindewald 65'; Yeboah 71'	(Report)		Stadium: Waldstadion; Attendance: 23,000; Referee: Kasper

5 June 1993 34	Hamburger SV	1–2	Eintracht Frankfurt	Hamburg, Germany
15:30 CEST	Babbel 73'	(Report)	Yeboah 27'; Schmitt 75'	Stadium: Volksparkstadion; Attendance: 16,500; Referee: Scheuerer

=== DFB-Pokal ===
19 August 1992 First round	SV Wehen	2–3	Eintracht Frankfurt	Wiesbaden, Germany
20:00 CEST	Sauer 89'; Raab 90'	(Report)	Binz 36'; Klein 38'; Yeboah 84'	Stadium: Stadion an der Berliner Straße; Attendance: 10,000; Referee: Fischer

12 September 1992 Second round	SC 08 Bamberg	1–3	Eintracht Frankfurt	Bamberg, Germany
15:00 CEST	Škorić 16'	(Report)	Kruse 31'; Yeboah 46', 86'	Stadium: Hauptkampfbahn im Volkspark; Attendance: 10,000; Referee: Weise

10 October 1992 Third round	Eintracht Frankfurt	4–1 (a.e.t.)	Waldhof Mannheim	Frankfurt, Germany
15:30 CEST	Yeboah 100'; Schmitt 106', 107'; Binz 110'	(Report)	Lasser (yellow card) 103' (yellow-red card); Winkler 120'	Stadium: Waldstadion; Attendance: 9,000

7 November 1992 Round of 16	Eintracht Frankfurt	3–1	VfL Osnabrück	Frankfurt, Germany
15:30 CEST	Kruse 15'; Okocha 45'; Schmitt 67'	(Report)	Meinke 40'	Stadium: Waldstadion; Attendance: 9,000; Referee: Best

2 December 1992 Quarter-finals	Karlsruher SC	1–1 (a.e.t.) (3–5 p)	Eintracht Frankfurt	Karlsruhe, Germany
20:15 CEST	Shmarov 50'	(Report)	Yeboah 40'	Stadium: Wildparkstadion; Attendance: 29,000; Referee: Heynemann
	Penalties
	Reich (penalty scored); Metz (penalty scored); Wittwer (penalty missed); Carl (penalty scored)		(penalty scored) Bein; (penalty scored) Bommer; (penalty scored) Binz; (penalty scored) Okocha; (penalty scored) Stein

30 March 1993 Semi-finals	Eintracht Frankfurt	0–3	Bayer Leverkusen	Frankfurt, Germany
19:00 CEST	[: Bindewald (red card) 55'	(Report)	Thom 6', 75'; Kirsten 72'	Stadium: Waldstadion; Attendance: 35,000; Referee: Harder

=== UEFA Cup ===
16 September 1992 First round, 1st leg	Widzew Łódź	2–2	Eintracht Frankfurt	Łódź, Poland
15:30 CEST	Joskowiak 19'; Koniarek 26'	(Report)	Yeboah 68'; Wolf 84'	Stadium: Stadion im. Ludwika Sobolewskiego; Attendance: 12,000; Referee: Deda

30 September 1992 First round, 2nd leg	Eintracht Frankfurt	9–0 (11–2 agg.)	Widzew Łódź	Frankfurt, Germany
18:00 CEST	Kruse 8', 14', 36'; Yeboah 20', 22', 36', 68'; Rahn 83'; Bein 90'	(Report)		Stadium: Waldstadion; Attendance: 11,000; Referee: Mottram

21 October 1992 Second round, 1st leg	Eintracht Frankfurt	0–0	Galatasaray	Frankfurt, Germany
20:15 CEST		(Report)		Stadium: Waldstadion; Attendance: 40,000; Referee: McGinlay

4 November 1992 Second round, 2nd leg	Galatasaray	1–0 (1–0 agg.)	Eintracht Frankfurt	Istanbul, Turkey
	Tütüneker 6'	(Report)		Stadium: Ali Sami Yen Stadyumu; Attendance: 40,000; Referee: Pairetto

== Squad ==
=== Squad and statistics ===
No.	Pos	Nat	Player	Total		Bundesliga		DFB-Pokal		UEFA Cup	
No.	Pos	Nat	Player	Apps	Goals	Apps	Goals	Apps	Goals	Apps	Goals
	GK	(Germany) GER	Thomas Ernst	0	0	0	0	0	0	0	0
	GK	(Germany) GER	Uli Stein	44	0	34	0	6	0	4	0
	DF	(Poland) POL	Dariusz Adamczuk	5	0	5	0	0	0	0	0
	DF	(Germany) GER	Uwe Bindewald	43	1	33	1	6	0	4	0
	DF	(Germany) GER	Manfred Binz	44	4	34	2	6	2	4	0
	DF	(Germany) GER	Jochen Kientz	1	0	1	0	0	0	0	0
	DF	(Germany) GER	Michael Klein	9	1	7	0	1	1	1	0
	DF	(Germany) GER	Thomas Reis	4	0	3	0	1	0	0	0
	DF	(Germany) GER	Dietmar Roth	34	1	26	1	4	0	4	0
	DF	(Germany) GER	Stefan Studer	29	2	21	2	4	0	4	0
	DF	(Germany) GER	Ralf Weber	32	1	25	1	4	0	3	0
	DF	(Georgia (country)) GEO	Kakhaber Tskhadadze	18	0	17	0	1	0	0	0
	MF	(Germany) GER	Michael Aničić	9	1	9	1	0	0	0	0
	MF	(Germany) GER	Uwe Bein	32	8	25	7	5	0	2	1
	MF	(Germany) GER	Rudi Bommer	33	2	24	2	5	0	4	0
	MF	(Brazil) BRA	Alessandro da Silva	1	0	1	0	0	0	0	0
	MF	(Germany) GER	Ralf Falkenmayer	21	0	17	0	3	0	1	0
	MF	(Federal Republic of Yugoslavia) YUG	Slobodan Komljenović	21	0	18	0	3	0	0	0
	MF	(Germany) GER	Frank Möller	1	0	1	0	0	0	0	0
	MF	(Nigeria) NGR	Jay-Jay Okocha	26	3	20	2	3	1	3	0
	MF	(Slovakia) SVK	Marek Penksa	16	0	12	0	3	0	1	0
	MF	(Germany) GER	Dirk Wolf	17	1	11	0	3	0	3	1
	FW	(Norway) NOR	Jørn Andersen	8	2	6	2	1	0	1	0
	FW	(Germany) GER	Axel Kruse	38	11	28	6	6	2	4	3
	FW	(Germany) GER	Uwe Rahn	15	4	12	3	1	0	2	1
	FW	(Germany) GER	Edgar Schmitt	30	13	23	10	6	3	1	0
	FW	(Ghana) GHA	Anthony Yeboah	37	30	27	20	6	5	4	5

== Sources ==
- Matheja, Ulrich (2011). Unsere Eintracht - Eintracht Frankfurt - Die Chronik. Die Werkstatt. ISBN 978-3-89533-750-5.
