= 1990–91 Eintracht Frankfurt season =

Eintracht Frankfurt
1990-91 season
- Chairman: Matthias Ohms
- Manager: Jörg Berger (sacked 13 April 1991); Dragoslav Stepanović (signed 14 April 1991)
- Bundesliga: 4th
- DFB-Pokal: First round
- Top goalscorer: League: Andreas Möller (16); All: Andreas Möller (18)
- Highest home attendance: 61,000 10 November 1990 v Bayern Munich (league)
- Lowest home attendance: 11,000 16 April 1991 v SG Wattenscheid 09 (league)
- Average home league attendance: 23,278
Home colours	Away colours

The 1990–91 Eintracht Frankfurt season was the 91st season in the club's football history. In 1990–91 the club played in the Bundesliga, the top tier of German football. It was the club's 28th season in the Bundesliga.

== Friendlies ==
Win Draw Loss

2 July 1990	VfL Eiterfeld	0–5	Eintracht Frankfurt
		(Report)	Gründel; Yeboah; Turowski; Falkenmayer; Eckstein

4 July 1990	SG Modau	0–10	Eintracht Frankfurt
		(Report)	Binz; Turowski; Körbel; Eckstein; Köhler; Falkenmayer	Attendance: 2,000

9 July 1990	Eintracht Frankfurt	2–2	Silkeborg IF	Frankfurt, West Germany
	Turowski 65'; Eckstein 84'	(Report)	Erfurt 9'; Fernandez 44'	Attendance: 1,500

18 July 1990 Philips Trophy (Semi-Finals)	FC Porto	0–0 (5–4 p)	Eintracht Frankfurt	Bern, Switzerland
		(Report)		Stadium: Wankdorf-Stadion; Attendance: 11,000
	Penalties
	Penalty scored		(penalty scored) Yeboah; (penalty scored) Möller; (penalty scored) Binz; (penalty scored) Lasser (penalty missed)

20 July 1990 Philips Trophy (3rd place play-off)	Lausanne-Sport	3–5	Eintracht Frankfurt	Bern, Switzerland
	Falkenmayer 8' (o.g.); Chapuisat 10'; Iskrenov 75'	(Report)	Möller 24'; Yeboah 41', 51'; Sippel 54', 85'	Stadium: Wankdorf-Stadion; Attendance: 8,000

22 July 1990	SV Guntersblum	2–15	Eintracht Frankfurt	Guntersblum, West Germany
18:00 CEST	Goal	(Report)	Möller; Falkenmayer; Bein; Turowski; Weber; Yeboah; Sippel	Stadium: Sportanlage Alsheimer Straße; Attendance: 1,500

25 July 1990	TSV Mauth	0–11	Eintracht Frankfurt
18:00 CEST		(Report)	Möller; Bein; Yeboah; Falkenmayer; Turowski; Weber	Attendance: 2,500

28 July 1990	Sportfreunde Burkhardsfelden	1–7	Eintracht Frankfurt
15:30 CEST	Goal	(Report)	Yeboah; Eckstein; Bein; Studer; Sippel	Attendance: 3,000

29 July 1990	Bayern Alzenau	0–8	Eintracht Frankfurt
		(Report)	Möller; Yeboah; Gründel; Turowski; Bein	Attendance: 3,000

1 August 1990	Eintracht Frankfurt	5–1	SV Darmstadt 98	Frankfurt, West Germany
	Möller 57' (pen.); Eckstein 63', 89'; Turowski 72', 81'	(Report)	Weiß 58'	Stadium: Waldstadion; Attendance: 800; Referee: Lehnhard

7 August 1990	SV Dreieichenhain	0–13	Eintracht Frankfurt
		(Report)	Yeboah; Sippel; Möller; Falkenmayer; Eckstein; Klein; Lasser	Attendance: 2,500

14 August 1990	Fulda XI	1–10	Eintracht Frankfurt	Fulda, West Germany
18:00 CEST	Goal	(Report)	Möller; Sippel; Falkenmayer; Gründel; Turowski; Klein; Lasser	Stadium: Sportplatz am Aschenberg; Attendance: 2,800

21 August 1990	Ekstraklasa XI	1–3	Eintracht Frankfurt	Gdańsk, Poland
	Goal	(Report)	Bein; Eckstein; Sippel	Attendance: 5,000

11 September 1990	SV 07 Kriftel	0–9	Eintracht Frankfurt
		(Report)	Möller; Sippel; Gründel; Klein; Eckstein; Köhler	Attendance: 100

6 February 1991	Eintracht Frankfurt	2–1	Rot-Weiss Frankfurt	Frankfurt, Germany
	Bein 4'; Falkenmayer 87' (pen.)	(Report)	Roth 41'	Stadium: Waldstadion; Attendance: 60; Referee: Welz

9 February 1991	Eintracht Frankfurt	7–1	SV Darmstadt 98	Frankfurt, Germany
	Möller; Yeboah; Binz; Bein; Sippel; Kruse	[www.eintracht-archiv.de/1990/1991-02-09st.html (Report)]	Gu	Stadium: Riederwaldstadion; Attendance: 200

16 February 1991	FSV Mainz 05	2–2	Eintracht Frankfurt	Alsheim, Germany
	Hönnscheidt 10'; Biagioli 17'	(Report)	Lopes 5' (o.g.); Falkenmayer 27' (pen.)	Attendance: 550; Referee: Föckler

2 June 1991	FC Eddersheim	0–13	Eintracht Frankfurt
		(Report)	Kruse 3', 40', 52'; Gründel 4'; Körbel 10'; Sippel 32'; Würzburger 42'; Bindewald 56', 63'; Binz 60', 86'; Lasser 87'; Doerk 89'	Attendance: 2,500; Referee: Schmidt

16 June 1991	Grün-Weiß Darmstadt	0–12	Eintracht Frankfurt
		(Report)	Kruse; Turowski; Sippel; Gründel; Yeboah; Möller

19 June 1991	TuS Wiehl Linden	0–4	Eintracht Frankfurt
		(Report)	Goal

21 June 1991	SV Allendorf/TSV Battenberg	0–5	Eintracht Frankfurt	Marburg, Germany
		(Report)	Möller; Gründel	Attendance: 3,000

23 June 1991	FC Herzogenaurach	2–7	Eintracht Frankfurt
	Goal	(Report)	Yeboah; Conrad; Sippel; Stein	Attendance: 1,100

== Competitions ==
Win Draw Loss

=== Bundesliga ===
==== League table ====
Pos	Team	Pld	W	D	L	GF	GA	GD	Pts	Qualification or relegation
2	Bayern Munich	34	18	9	7	74	41	+33	45	Qualification to UEFA Cup first round (Note: As Werder Bremen qualified for the Cup Winners' Cup, their UEFA-Cup place was transferred to Stuttgart.)
3	Werder Bremen	34	14	14	6	46	29	+17	42	Qualification to Cup Winners' Cup first round
4	Eintracht Frankfurt	34	15	10	9	63	40	+23	40	Qualification to UEFA Cup first round
5	Hamburger SV	34	16	8	10	60	38	+22	40	Qualification to UEFA Cup first round
6	VfB Stuttgart	34	14	10	10	57	44	+13	38	Qualification to UEFA Cup first round

Source: www.dfb.de
Rules for classification: 1) points; 2) goal difference; 3) number of goals scored.
The league expanded to 20 teams for the 1991–92 season because of the integration of the two best East German Oberliga teams due to German reunification.

==== Results by round ====
Round	1	2	3	4	5	6	7	8	9	10	11	12	13	14	15	16	17	18	19	20	21	22	23	24	25	26	27	28	29	30	31	32	33	34
Ground	H	A	H	A	H	A	H	A	A	H	A	H	A	H	A	H	A	A	H	A	H	A	H	A	H	H	A	H	A	H	A	H	A	H
Result	W	D	W	D	D	D	W	W	L	W	L	L	L	W	D	D	L	D	L	L	D	D	W	L	L	W	W	W	L	L	W	W	D	W
Position	1	4	1	3	2	4	4	2	3	2	3	5	4	4	4	4	4	5	4	4	5	5	4	5	7	6	5	5	6	6	6	5	5	4

Source: kicker.de
A = Away; H = Home; W = Win; D = Draw; L = Loss

==== Matches ====
11 August 1990 1	Eintracht Frankfurt	3–0	Karlsruher SC	Frankfurt, West Germany
15:30 CEST	Binz 28'; Yeboah 61'; Turowski 87'	(Report)		Stadium: Waldstadion; Attendance: 29,000; Referee: Krug

18 August 1990 2	1. FC Kaiserslautern	1–1	Eintracht Frankfurt	Kaiserslautern, West Germany
15:30 CEST	Roos (red card) 0'; Kadlec 31'	(Report)	Gründel 56'	Stadium: Fritz-Walter-Stadion; Attendance: 30,500; Referee: Dardenne

24 August 1990 3	Eintracht Frankfurt	5–1	Fortuna Düsseldorf	Frankfurt, West Germany
20:00 CEST	Bein 21' (pen.); Möller 40', 48' (pen.); Turowski 45'; Hutwelker 79' (o.g.)	(Report)	Kaiser 19'	Stadium: Waldstadion; Attendance: 30,000; Referee: Mölm

1 September 1990 4	VfL Bochum	0–0	Eintracht Frankfurt	Bochum, West Germany
15:30 CEST		(Report)		Stadium: Ruhrstadion; Attendance: 18,500; Referee: Berg

8 September 1990 5	Eintracht Frankfurt	0–0	Werder Bremen	Frankfurt, West Germany
15:30 CEST		(Report)		Stadium: Waldstadion; Attendance: 25,000; Referee: Broska

15 September 1990 6	Borussia Mönchengladbach	1–1	Eintracht Frankfurt	Mönchengladbach, West Germany
15:30 CEST	Straka (red card) 35'; Max 73'	(Report)	Möller 62'	Stadium: Bökelbergstadion; Attendance: 15,500; Referee: Wiesel

22 September 1990 7	Eintracht Frankfurt	1–0	1. FC Köln	Frankfurt, West Germany
15:30 CEST	Falkenmayer 21'	(Report)		Stadium: Waldstadion; Attendance: 19,000; Referee: Föckler

29 September 1990 8	Hamburger SV	0–1	Eintracht Frankfurt	Hamburg, West Germany
15:30 CEST		(Report)	Möller 44'	Stadium: Volksparkstadion; Attendance: 22,500; Referee: Führer

6 October 1990 9	SG Wattenscheid 09	1–0	Eintracht Frankfurt	Bochum, Germany
15:30 CEST	Frank Hartmann 34'	(Report)		Stadium: Lohrheidestadion; Attendance: 10,000; Referee: Kriegelstein

13 October 1990 10	Eintracht Frankfurt	3–1	Borussia Dortmund	Frankfurt, Germany
15:30 CEST	Yeboah 50'; Möller 67'; Gründel 72'	(Report)	Strerath 84'	Stadium: Waldstadion; Attendance: 29,000; Referee: Theobald

20 October 1990 11	Hertha BSC	1–0	Eintracht Frankfurt	Berlin, Germany
15:30 CEST	Kruse 19'	(Report)		Stadium: Olympiastadion; Attendance: 18,500; Referee: Assenmacher

27 October 1990 12	Eintracht Frankfurt	1–4	Bayern Munich	Frankfurt, Germany
15:30 CEST	Eckstein 82'	(Report)	Wohlfarth 28'; Laudrup 41'; Effenberg 65'; Kohler 77'	Stadium: Waldstadion; Attendance: 61,000; Referee: Neuner

10 November 1990 13	1. FC Nürnberg	0–2	Eintracht Frankfurt	Nuremberg, Germany
15:30 CEST		(Report)	Weber 63'; Bein 64'	Stadium: Städtisches Stadion; Attendance: 15,000; Referee: Löwer

17 November 1990 14	Eintracht Frankfurt	4–0	Bayer Uerdingen	Frankfurt, Germany
15:30 CEST	Yeboah 22'; Möller 29'; Bein 65'; Weber 85'	(Report)		Stadium: Waldstadion; Attendance: 12,000; Referee: Osmers

24 November 1990 15	Bayer Leverkusen	2–2	Eintracht Frankfurt	Leverkusen, Germany
15:30 CEST	Foda 77'; Herrlich 87'	(Report)	Seckler 8' (o.g.); Möller 64'	Stadium: Ulrich-Haberland-Stadion; Attendance: 12,500; Referee: Dellwing

8 December 1990 16	Eintracht Frankfurt	1–1	FC St. Pauli	Frankfurt, Germany
15:30 CEST	Turowski 72'	(Report)	Zander 81'	Stadium: Waldstadion; Attendance: 14,000; Referee: Dardenne

16 December 1990 17	VfB Stuttgart	2–1	Eintracht Frankfurt	Stuttgart, Germany
19:00 CEST	Buchwald 48'; Sverrisson 62'	(Report)	Bein 90'	Stadium: Neckarstadion; Attendance: 19,000; Referee: Weber

26 February 1991 18	Karlsruher SC	2–2	Eintracht Frankfurt	Karlsruhe, Germany
20:00 CEST	Harforth 24'; Reichert 44'	(Report)	Studer 42'; Kruse 67'	Stadium: Wildparkstadion; Attendance: 17,000; Referee: Aust

2 March 1991 19	Eintracht Frankfurt	4–3	1. FC Kaiserslautern	Frankfurt, Germany
15:30 CEST	Möller 3', 27', 28'; Bein 51'	(Report)	Hotić 7'; Kuntz 32' (pen.); Stadler (red card) 44'; Kadlec 73' (pen.)	Stadium: Waldstadion; Attendance: 30,000; Referee: Prengel

9 March 1991 20	Fortuna Düsseldorf	1–0	Eintracht Frankfurt	Düsseldorf, Germany
15:30 CEST	Carracedo 74'	(Report)		Stadium: Rheinstadion; Attendance: 12,000; Referee: Kasper

16 March 1991 21	Eintracht Frankfurt	1–1	VfL Bochum	Frankfurt, Germany
15:30 CEST	Reekers 8' (o.g.)	(Report)	Kohn 2'	Stadium: Waldstadion; Attendance: 21,000; Referee: Habermann

22 March 1991 22	Werder Bremen	1–1	Eintracht Frankfurt	Bremen, Germany
20:00 CEST	Neubarth 77'	(Report)	Möller 67'	Stadium: Weserstadion; Attendance: 23,500; Referee: Steinborn

3 April 1991 23	Eintracht Frankfurt	5–1	Borussia Mönchengladbach	Frankfurt, Germany
20:00 CEST	Kruse 4', 11'; Bein 19'; Gründel 40'; Yeboah 59'	(Report)	Spies 29'	Stadium: Waldstadion; Attendance: 24,000; Referee: Malbranc

6 April 1991 24	1. FC Köln	2–1	Eintracht Frankfurt	Cologne, Germany
15:30 CEST	Littbarski 26'; Sturm 50'	(Report)	Binz 24'	Stadium: Müngersdorfer Stadion; Attendance: 23,000; Referee: Wiesel

13 April 1991 25	Eintracht Frankfurt	0–6	Hamburger SV	Frankfurt, Germany
15:30 CEST		(Report)	Furtok 26', 46', 85'; Eck 58'; Matysik 73'; Spörl 89'	Stadium: Waldstadion; Attendance: 29,000; Referee: Löwer

16 April 1991 26	Eintracht Frankfurt	4–0	SG Wattenscheid 09	Frankfurt, Germany
20:00 CEST	Möller 18'; Gründel 53'; Langbein 58' (o.g.); Bein 63' (pen.)	(Report)		Stadium: Waldstadion; Attendance: 11,000; Referee: Strigel

20 April 1991 27	Borussia Dortmund	0–3	Eintracht Frankfurt	Dortmund, Germany
15:30 CEST		(Report)	Studer 52'; Lasser 79'; Möller 89' (pen.)	Stadium: Westfalenstadion; Attendance: 34,500; Referee: Föckler

4 May 1991 28	Eintracht Frankfurt	5–1	Hertha BSC	Frankfurt, Germany
15:30 CEST	Möller 10', 31'; Binz 62'; Sippel 72', 89'	(Report)	Greiser 75'	Stadium: Waldstadion; Attendance: 11,500; Referee: Aust

11 May 1991 29	Bayern Munich	2–0	Eintracht Frankfurt	Munich, Germany
15:30 CEST	Kohler 70'; Effenberg 87'			Stadium: Olympiastadion; Attendance: 37,000; Referee: Kriegelstein

17 May 1991 30	Eintracht Frankfurt	0–1	1. FC Nürnberg	Frankfurt, Germany
20:00 CEST		(Report)	Stein 34' (o.g.)	Stadium: Waldstadion; Attendance: 17,000; Referee: Führer

24 May 1991 31	Bayer Uerdingen	2–3	Eintracht Frankfurt	Krefeld, Germany
20:00 CEST	Chapuisat 25'; Fach 37'	(Report)	Binz 48' (pen.); Turowski 60'; Yeboah 79'	Stadium: Grotenburg-Stadion; Attendance: 8,000; Referee: Mölm

30 May 1990 32	Eintracht Frankfurt	3–1	Bayer Leverkusen	Frankfurt, Germany
20:15 CEST	Turowski 19', 68'; Yeboah 22'	(Report)	Kirsten 49'	Stadium: Waldstadion; Attendance: 16,500; Referee: Matheis

8 June 1991 33	FC St. Pauli	1–1	Eintracht Frankfurt	Hamburg, Germany
15:30 CEST	Ottens 8'	(Report)	Yeboah 44'	Stadium: Wilhelm-Koch-Stadion; Attendance: 20,000; Referee: Prengel

15 June 1991 34	Eintracht Frankfurt	4–0	VfB Stuttgart	Frankfurt, Germany
15:30 CEST	Möller 26'; Studer 44'; Yeboah 45'; Bein 60'	(Report)		Stadium: Waldstadion; Attendance: 40,000; Referee: Krug

=== DFB-Pokal ===
28 August 1990 1st Round	ASC Schöppingen	1–2	Eintracht Frankfurt	West Germany
	Pickenäcker 42'	(Report)	Yeboah 7'; Eckstein 68'	Attendance: 5,000; Referee: Prengel

3 November 1990 2nd Round	Eintracht Frankfurt	0–0 (a.e.t.)	1. FC Nürnberg	Frankfurt, Germany
		(Report)		Stadium: Waldstadion; Attendance: 10,000; Referee: Tritschler

13 November 1990 2nd Round Replay	1. FC Nürnberg	0–2 (a.e.t.)	Eintracht Frankfurt	Nuremberg, Germany
		(Report)	Möller 95'; Falkenmayer 111'	Stadium: Städtisches Stadion; Attendance: 8,000; Referee: Strigel

1 December 1990 3rd Round	1. FC Saarbrücken	0–0 (a.e.t.)	Eintracht Frankfurt	Saarbrücken, Germany
15:30 CEST		(Report)		Stadium: Ludwigsparkstadion; Attendance: 20,000; Referee: Krug

5 March 1991 3rd Round Replay	Eintracht Frankfurt	3–2 (a.e.t.)	1. FC Saarbrücken	Frankfurt, Germany
20:00 CEST	Yeboah 12'; Kruse 81'; Möller 104'	(Report)	Schüler 7'; Preetz 86'	Stadium: Waldstadion; Attendance: 10,000; Referee: Assenmacher

30 March 1991 Quarter-finals	Eintracht Frankfurt	3–1	SG Wattenscheid 09	Frankfurt, Germany
15:30 CEST	Binz 21'; Kruse 31', 70'	(Report)	Ibrahim 84'	Stadium: Waldstadion; Attendance: 14,000; Referee: Theobald

25 April 1991 Semi-finals	Eintracht Frankfurt	2–2 (a.e.t.)	Werder Bremen	Frankfurt, Germany
19:00 CEST	Klein 22'; Binz 29'; Yeboah (red card)	(Report)	Gründel 1' (o.g.); Bode 61'	Stadium: Waldstadion; Attendance: 32,000; Referee: Weber

8 May 1991 Semi-finals Replay	Werder Bremen	6–3	Eintracht Frankfurt	Bremen, Germany
20:00 CEST	Rufer 9', 30', 74'; Bratseth 29'; Neubarth 37'; Allofs 81'	(Report)	Sippel 15', 67'; Binz 73' (pen.)	Stadium: Weserstadion; Attendance: 21,000; Referee: Dellwing

=== UEFA Cup ===
19 September 1990 1st Round	Brøndby IF	5–0	Eintracht Frankfurt	Copenhagen, Denmark
19:00 CEST	Uche 9'; Christensen 53', 78'; Christofte 61' (pen.); Madsen 82'	(Report)		Stadium: Idrætsparken; Attendance: 12,500; Referee: Waddell

3 October 1990 1st Round	Eintracht Frankfurt	4–1	Brøndby IF	Frankfurt, Germany
20:00 CEST	Yeboah 5'; Eckstein 22'; Bein 35'; Möller 86'	(Report)	Christensen 28'	Stadium: Waldstadion; Attendance: 10,000; Referee: Butenko

== Squad ==
=== Squad and statistics ===
No.	Pos	Nat	Player	Total		Bundesliga		DFB-Pokal		UEFA Cup	
No.	Pos	Nat	Player	Apps	Goals	Apps	Goals	Apps	Goals	Apps	Goals
	GK	(Germany) GER	Thomas Ernst	1	0	0	0	1	0	0	0
	GK	(Germany) GER	Uli Stein	43	0	34	0	7	0	2	0
	DF	(Germany) GER	Uwe Bindewald	15	0	13	0	1	0	1	0
	DF	(Germany) GER	Manfred Binz	44	7	34	4	8	3	2	0
	DF	(Germany) GER	Charly Körbel	43	0	33	0	8	0	2	0
	DF	(Germany) GER	Dietmar Roth	39	0	30	0	8	0	1	0
	DF	(Germany) GER	Stefan Studer	42	3	33	3	7	0	2	0
	DF	(Germany) GER	Ralf Weber	19	2	13	2	5	0	1	0
	MF	(Germany) GER	Uwe Bein	40	9	31	8	8	0	1	1
	MF	(Germany) GER	Alexander Conrad	1	0	1	0	0	0	0	0
	MF	(Germany) GER	~~Dieter Eckstein~~	23	3	17	1	4	1	2	1
	MF	(Germany) GER	Ralf Falkenmayer	27	2	21	1	4	1	2	0
	MF	(Germany) GER	Heinz Gründel	37	4	29	4	7	0	1	0
	MF	(Germany) GER	Michael Klein	17	1	14	0	2	1	1	0
	MF	(Germany) GER	~~André Köhler~~	0	0	0	0	0	0	0	0
	MF	(Germany) GER	Thomas Lasser	22	1	15	1	6	0	1	0
	MF	(Germany) GER	Andreas Möller	41	18	32	16	7	1	2	1
	MF	(Germany) GER	~~Ralf Sievers~~	1	0	1	0	0	0	0	0
	FW	(Germany) GER	Axel Kruse	15	6	12	3	3	3	0	0
	FW	(Germany) GER	Lothar Sippel	25	4	19	2	4	2	2	0
	FW	(Poland) POL	Janusz Turowski	29	6	22	6	6	0	1	0
	FW	(United States) USA	David Wagner	1	0	1	0	0	0	0	0
	FW	(Ghana) GHA	Tony Yeboah	33	11	26	8	6	2	1	1

== Sources ==
- Matheja, Ulrich (2011). Unsere Eintracht - Eintracht Frankfurt - Die Chronik. Die Werkstatt. ISBN 978-3-89533-750-5.
