= 1988 DFB-Supercup =

German Supercup
- Match programme cover
- Event: DFB-Supercup
Werder Bremen	Eintracht Frankfurt
2	0
- Date: 20 July 1988
- Venue: Waldstadion, Frankfurt
- Referee: Karl-Josef Assenmacher (Hürth)
- Attendance: 20,500

The 1988 DFB-Supercup was the second DFB-Supercup, an annual football match contested by the winners of the previous season's Bundesliga and DFB-Pokal competitions.

The match was played at the Waldstadion in Frankfurt, and contested by league champions Werder Bremen and cup winners Eintracht Frankfurt. Bremen won the match 2–0 for their first title.

== Teams ==
Team	Qualification	Previous appearances (bold indicates winners)
Werder Bremen	1987–88 Bundesliga champions	None
Eintracht Frankfurt	1987–88 DFB-Pokal winners	None

== Match ==
=== Details ===
20 July 1988
20:15 CEST

Werder Bremen	2–0	Eintracht Frankfurt
Riedle 24'; Burgsmüller 90'	Report

Waldstadion, Frankfurt
Attendance: 20,500
Referee: Karl-Josef Assenmacher (Hürth)

**Werder Bremen**	**Eintracht Frankfurt**

GK	**1**	(West Germany) Oliver Reck
SW		(West Germany) Gunnar Sauer
CB		(West Germany) Uli Borowka
CB		(West Germany) Michael Kutzop
CB		(West Germany) Jonny Otten	(substituted off) 46'
RM		(West Germany) Thomas Schaaf
CM		(West Germany) Miroslav Votava (c)
CM		(West Germany) Günter Hermann
LM		(West Germany) Frank Neubarth
CF		(West Germany) Karl-Heinz Riedle
CF		(West Germany) Frank Ordenewitz	(substituted off) 46'
Substitutions:
MF		(West Germany) Norbert Meier	(substituted on) 46'
FW		(West Germany) Manfred Burgsmüller	(substituted on) 46'
Manager:
(West Germany) Otto Rehhagel

GK	**1**	(West Germany) Uli Stein
SW		(West Germany) Manfred Binz (c)
CB		(West Germany) Ralf Sievers
CB		(West Germany) Charly Körbel
CB		(West Germany) Stefan Studer
RM		(West Germany) Frank Schulz
CM		(England) Peter Hobday	(substituted off) 46'
CM		(West Germany) Dieter Schlindwein
LM		(West Germany) Maximilian Heidenreich	(substituted off) 57'
CF		(Norway) Jørn Andersen
CF		(West Germany) Heinz Gründel
Substitutions:
DF		(West Germany) Dietmar Roth	(substituted on) 46'
FW		(West Germany) Ralf Balzis	(substituted on) 57'
Manager:
(West Germany) Karl-Heinz Feldkamp

== See also ==
- 1988–89 Bundesliga
- 1988–89 DFB-Pokal
