= Frank Möller =

Frank Möller may refer to:

- Frank Möller (judoka) (born 1970), German judoka
- Frank Möller (athlete) (born 1960), German athlete
- Frank Möller (footballer) (born 1967), German footballer
