= Alessandro da Silva (footballer) =

Brazilian footballer (born 1970)

Personal information
- Full name: Alessandro Alvares da Silva
- Date of birth: 7 November 1970 (age 55)
- Place of birth: São Paulo, Brazil
- Height: 1.65 m (5 ft 5 in)
- Position: Midfielder

Youth career
- –1991: São Paulo

Senior career*
Years	Team	Apps	(Gls)
1992–1993	Eintracht Frankfurt	1	(0)
1992–1993	Eintracht Frankfurt II	29	(2)
1993–1994	VfB Gießen		
1996–2000	SV Wilhelmshaven	107	(9)
2000–2003	Eintracht Braunschweig	88	(0)
2003–2005	SC Paderborn	60	(2)
2005–2007	Waldhof Mannheim	7	(0)
Total		292	(13)
- * Club domestic league appearances and goals

Alessandro Alvares da Silva (born 7 November 1970) is a Brazilian former professional footballer who played as a midfielder. He spent most of his career in Germany and played one season each in the Bundesliga and 2. Bundesliga.
