= Andreas Kaiser =

German footballer

Personal information
- Date of birth: 4 May 1964 (age 62)
- Place of birth: Monheim am Rhein, West Germany
- Height: 1.76 m (5 ft 9 in)
- Position: Midfielder

Senior career*
Years	Team	Apps	(Gls)
1984–1993	Fortuna Düsseldorf	193	(9)
- * Club domestic league appearances and goals

Andreas Kaiser (born 4 May 1964) is a retired German football player.
