= Jochen Kientz =

German footballer and model

Personal information
- Date of birth: 17 September 1972 (age 54)
- Place of birth: Mannheim, West Germany
- Height: 1.84 m (6 ft 0 in)
- Position: Centre-back

Youth career
- SpVgg Ketsch
- SV 98 Schwetzingen
- VfR Mannheim
- Waldhof Mannheim
- SV Sandhausen

Senior career*
Years	Team	Apps	(Gls)
1991–1994	Eintracht Frankfurt	1	(0)
1994–1995	1860 Munich	7	(0)
1995–1996	Mallorca	37	(5)
1996–1997	Logroñés	19	(0)
1997–1999	1860 Munich	36	(1)
2000	Panionios	13	(1)
2000–2001	Hamburger SV	11	(1)
2001–2002	FC St. Pauli	20	(1)
2002–2004	Hansa Rostock	23	(1)
Total		167	(10)

International career
1990–1991	Germany U18	2	(0)
- * Club domestic league appearances and goals

Jochen Kientz (born 17 September 1972) is a German former professional footballer who played as a centre-back.

== Career ==
Born in Mannheim, Kientz played youth football at several clubs, including local VfR Mannheim and SV Waldhof Mannheim, but made his professional debuts with Eintracht Frankfurt, with whom he signed in January 1991; during the course of three Bundesliga seasons, he only made one league appearance and, in another winter transfer market move, in 1994, dropped down to the 2. Bundesliga and joined TSV 1860 Munich.

After only seven matches with the Lions, Kientz tried an abroad adventure, playing two seasons in Spain, one apiece with RCD Mallorca and CD Logroñés – the former in Segunda División where he appeared and scored regularly, the latter in La Liga, in a season which ended in relegation.

In the summer of 1997, Kientz returned to his country and to 1860 Munich, now in the top level, starting in one season and being backup in the other. He scored his first goal in the competition on 7 November 1998, albeit in a 3–1 derby loss against FC Bayern Munich.

After a very brief spell in Greece with Panionios FC, Kientz signed for Hamburger SV. At the Hanseatic club, he also appeared in the 2000–01 edition of the UEFA Champions League; during the competition, man-marking Zinedine Zidane in a home fixture, he was eventually headbutted by the Frenchman, who was sent off – the hosts won 3–1.

In 2001, Kientz joined neighbouring FC St. Pauli, being ejected from a game for the only time in his career, during a 2–0 loss at VfB Stuttgart, as his team eventually ranked last. After two injury-ravaged campaigns at F.C. Hansa Rostock (mainly ankle), he was forced to retire at the age of 32.

== Post-retirement life ==
Subsequently, Kientz worked as a model for Amaze Models, owned by former Eintracht player Patrick Glöckner.
