= Edgar Schmitt =

German former professional footballer (born 1963)

Personal information
- Date of birth: 29 April 1963 (age 63)
- Place of birth: Rittersdorf, West Germany
- Height: 1.78 m (5 ft 10 in)
- Position: Striker

Senior career*
Years	Team	Apps	(Gls)
1984–1987	FSV Salmrohr	31	(4)
1987–1988	1. FC Saarbrücken	22	(0)
1988–1991	Eintracht Trier	?	(?)
1991–1993	Eintracht Frankfurt	30	(10)
1993–1997	Karlsruher SC	72	(21)
1997–1998	Fortuna Köln	25	(8)
Total		180	(43)

Managerial career
- 2007–2008: VfR Aalen
- 2008–2009: Stuttgarter Kickers
- 2010: Uerdingen 05
- 2011–2012: TSV Essingen
- * Club domestic league appearances and goals

Edgar Schmitt (born 29 April 1963) is a German former professional footballer who played as a striker. He notably scored four goals in Karlsruher SC's 7–0 win against Valencia CF in the second round of the 1993–94 UEFA Cup, a win which came to be known as the "Wunder vom Wildpark". That season he also became the competition's top scorer with 8 goals, alongside Dennis Bergkamp. Following his retirement as a player, he went into coaching and was most recently manager of TSV Essingen.
