= Oliver Westerbeek =

German footballer

Personal information
- Date of birth: 8 February 1966 (age 60)
- Height: 1.83 m (6 ft 0 in)
- Positions: Defender; midfielder

Senior career*
Years	Team	Apps	(Gls)
1987–1988	FC Homburg	12	(3)
1988–1989	VfL Bochum	15	(0)
1989–1990	FC Homburg	24	(3)
1990–1992	Karlsruher SC	17	(0)
1992–1997	MSV Duisburg	134	(8)
1997–1999	Fortuna Köln	55	(3)
1999–2000	KFC Uerdingen 05	20	(0)
Total		277	(17)
- * Club domestic league appearances and goals

Oliver Westerbeek (born 8 February 1966) is a German former professional footballer who played as a defender or midfielder.

== Personal ==
Westerbeek works since 1999 as player agent for Rogon.
