= Michael Harforth =

German footballer

Personal information
- Date of birth: 9 February 1959 (age 67)
- Height: 1.74 m (5 ft 9 in)
- Position: Midfielder

Youth career
- 1966–1977: Karlsruher SC

Senior career*
Years	Team	Apps	(Gls)
1977–1980	Karlsruher SC	72	(8)
1980–1981	Freiburger FC	32	(9)
1981–1982	Karlsruher SC	16	(1)
1982–1983	SV Wiesbaden		
1983–1992	Karlsruher SC	261	(26)
1992–1993	MSV Duisburg	15	(0)
1993–1996	Hannover 96	17	(0)
1996–1997	SG Egelsbach	31	(3)
1997–1998	SV Darmstadt 98	29	(1)
- * Club domestic league appearances and goals

Michael Harforth (born 9 February 1959) is a retired German footballer who played with Karlsruher SC, Freiburger FC, SV Wiesbaden, MSV Duisburg, Hannover 96, SG Egelsbach and SV Darmstadt 98.
