= Lothar Sippel =

German footballer and coach

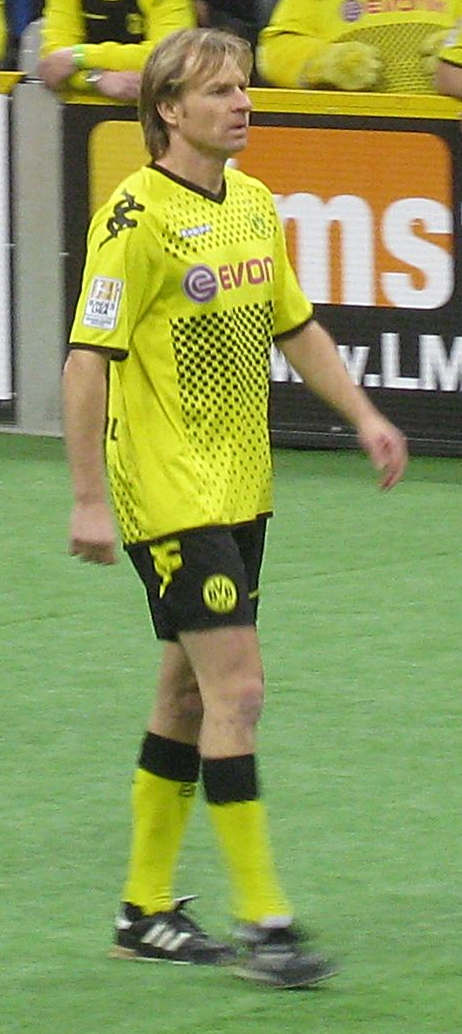
- Sippel in December 2011

Personal information
- Date of birth: 9 May 1965 (age 61)
- Place of birth: Göttingen, West Germany
- Height: 1.74 m (5 ft 9 in)
- Position: Striker

Youth career
- 1972–1985: RSV Göttingen 05

Senior career*
| Years | Team | Apps | (Gls) |
| 1985–1989 | Hessen Kassel | 103 | (48) |
| 1989–1992 | Eintracht Frankfurt | 69 | (18) |
| 1992–1994 | Borussia Dortmund | 39 | (5) |
| 1994–1996 | Hannover 96 | 39 | (5) |
| 1997 | SpVgg Unterhaching | 2 | (0) |
| 1998 | First Vienna FC | | |

Managerial career
- 1997–1998: Sportfreunde Ricklingen
- 1998: First Vienna FC
- 1998–1999: Arminia Hannover
- 2006: Al-Wahda (assistant)
- * Club domestic league appearances and goals

Lothar Sippel (born 9 May 1965, in Göttingen) is a German football coach and a former player.

== Honours ==
- UEFA Cup finalist: 1993
