= Dieter Eckstein =

German footballer (born 1964)

Personal information
- Date of birth: 12 March 1964 (age 62)
- Place of birth: Kehl, West Germany
- Height: 1.78 m (5 ft 10 in)
- Position: Striker

Youth career
- 1970–1983: Kehler FV
- 1983–1984: 1. FC Nürnberg

Senior career*
Years	Team	Apps	(Gls)
1984–1988	1. FC Nürnberg	135	(51)
1988–1991	Eintracht Frankfurt	70	(14)
1991–1993	1. FC Nürnberg	85	(28)
1993–1995	Schalke 04	30	(4)
1995	West Ham United	0	(0)
1995–1996	Waldhof Mannheim	21	(1)
1996	FC Winterthur	11	(8)
1996–1998	FC Augsburg	49	(26)
1998–1999	SG Post/Süd Regensburg		
1999	SV Heidingsfeld		
2000–2001	TSV Neusäß		
2001	FC Erzberg-Wörnitz		
2004	FSV Weißenbrunn		
2005	TSV Burkersdorf		

International career
1985–1986	West Germany U-21	7	(4)
1986–1988	West Germany	7	(0)
1987–1988	West Germany Olympic	3	(0)
- * Club domestic league appearances and goals

Dieter Eckstein (born 12 March 1964) is a German former professional footballer who played as a striker.

== Club career ==
Eckes was born in Kehl. He played for several German clubs, as well as clubs in Switzerland, and West Ham United in England.

== International career ==
Eckstein played for the West Germany national team, earning seven caps. Eckstein was a participant at the EURO 1988.

== After retirement ==
On 1 July 2011, while playing in a charity match for amateur side VfR Regensburg, Eckstein had a heart failure and fell into a coma. He was transferred to the University hospital at Regensburg, where his situation was stabilised. The incident is thought to not have caused any permanent damage to his body.
