= Hans-Jürgen Weber =

German football referee

- Born: 15 June 1955 (age 71); Essen, Germany
- Other occupation: Civil servant

Domestic
Years	League	Role
1978–1989	2nd Bundesliga	Referee
1984–1999	Bundesliga	Referee

International
Years	League	Role
1991–1998	FIFA listed	Referee

Hans-Jürgen Weber (born 15 June 1955) is a former football referee from Germany. Between 1978 and 1999 he refereed 135 games in the Fußball-Bundesliga and 76 games in the 2nd Bundesliga. From 1991 to 1998 Hans-Jürgen Weber has refereed quite a few European matches, mainly UEFA Cup (7) and Cup Winners' Cup (4) matches.

Weber is a member of the German Football Association's Referee Commission since 2010.
