= Uwe Bein =

German footballer

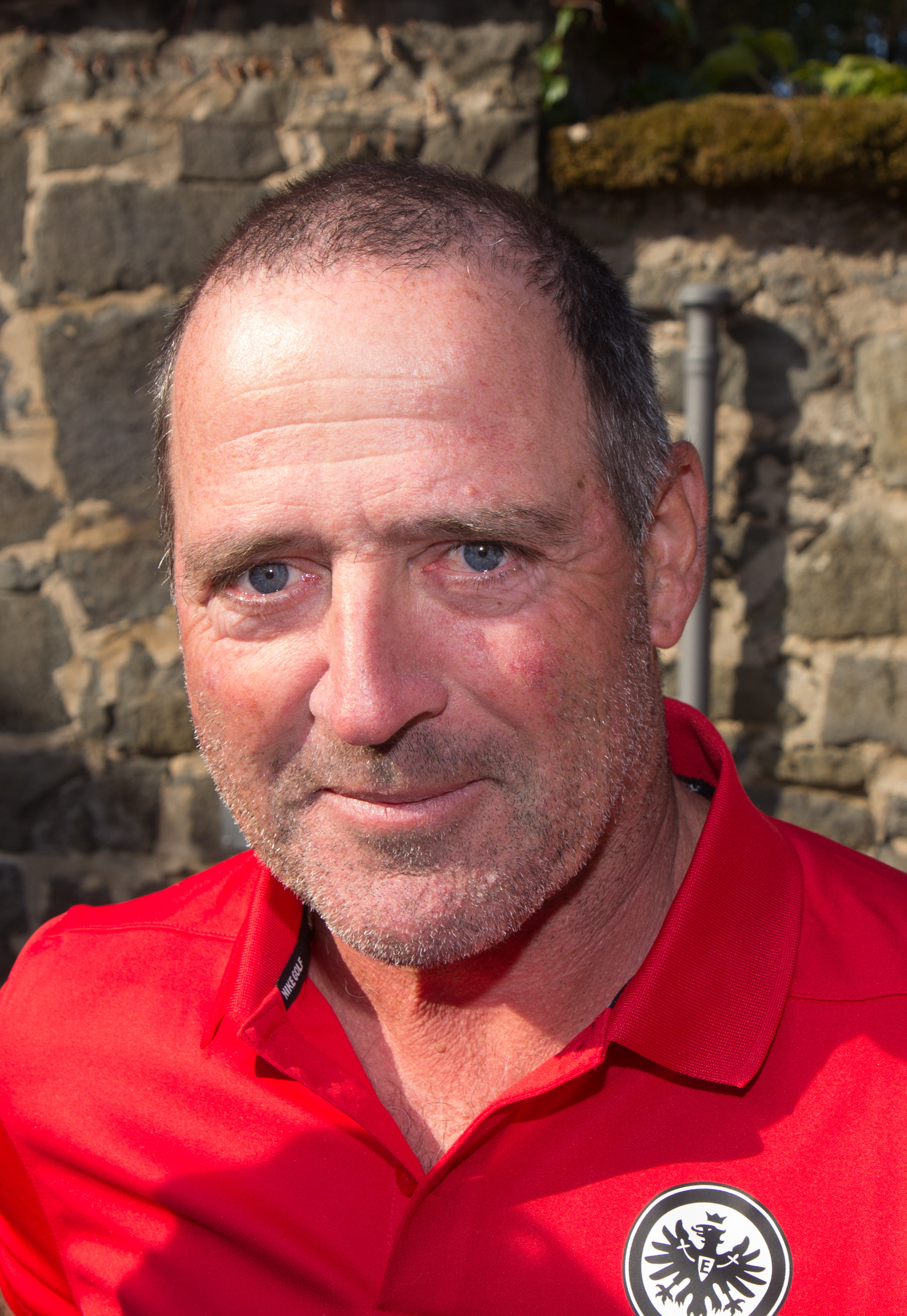
- Bein in 2018

Personal information
- Date of birth: 26 September 1960 (age 66)
- Place of birth: Heringen, West Germany
- Height: 1.81 m (5 ft 11 in)
- Position: Midfielder

Youth career
- 1968–1975: TSV Lengers
- 1975–1978: VfB Heringen

Senior career*
Years	Team	Apps	(Gls)
1978–1984	Kickers Offenbach	153	(72)
1984–1987	1. FC Köln	64	(17)
1987–1989	Hamburger SV	52	(22)
1989–1994	Eintracht Frankfurt	150	(38)
1994–1997	Urawa Red Diamonds	68	(25)
1997–1998	VfB Gießen	22	(12)
Total		509	(186)

International career
1983	West Germany Olympic	2	(0)
1989–1993	West Germany/Germany	17	(3)
- * Club domestic league appearances and goals

Uwe Bein (born 26 September 1960) is a German former professional footballer who played as a midfielder.

== Career ==
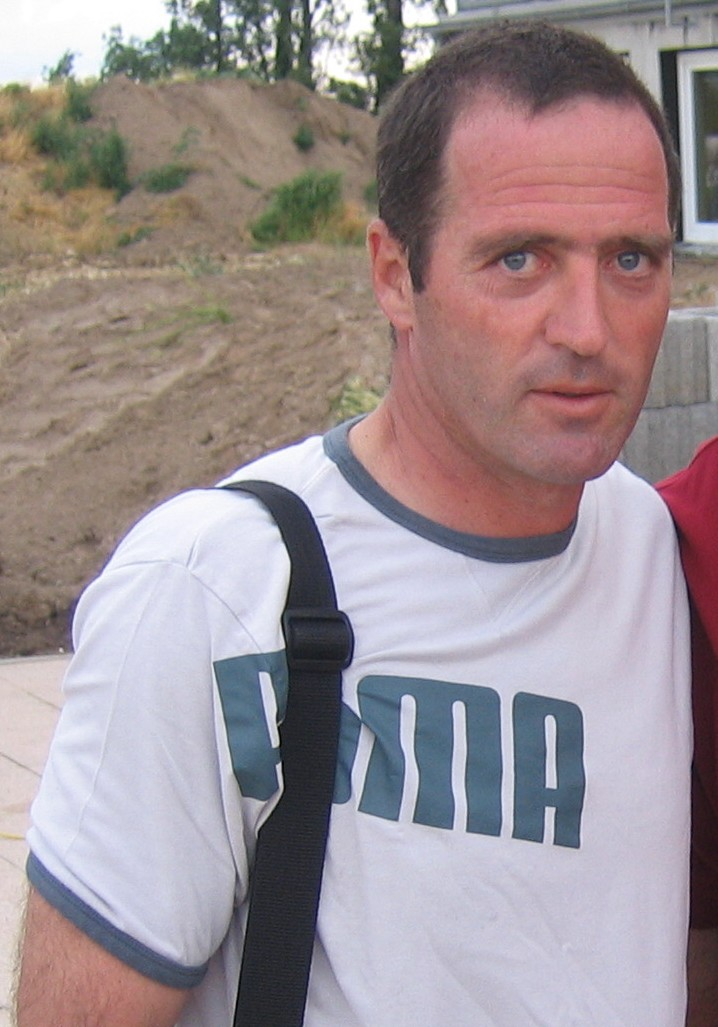
Bein in 2005

Bein's professional career began in 1978 with Kickers Offenbach, before he moved to 1. FC Köln, Hamburger SV and Eintracht Frankfurt. He played 300 Bundesliga games and scored 91 goals in total. He also helped Köln to the 1986 UEFA Cup Final where his goal could not prevent them losing to Real Madrid. In 1994, he moved to Japan and started playing for Urawa Red Diamonds in 1996. In 1997, he made appearances for VfB Gießen.

The biggest success in Bein's career occurred during the 1990 FIFA World Cup, where he played four of seven games before suffering from an injury. He scored one goal in the 5–1 win over the United Arab Emirates. He started all three group matches plus the quarter-final against Czechoslovakia but did not play in the final.

He did not take part in the Euro 92. Lacking support from the German head coach Berti Vogts, Bein finally retired from the national team in 1993, and thus did not take part in the World Cup 1994.

In total, he played 17 international matches, with three goals to his credit.

After his playing career ended he managed for half a year Kickers Offenbach in 2005.

== Style of play ==
Considered by fans and pundits to be one of the finest players in Eintracht Frankfurt's history, Bein was a skillful left-footed playmaker who stood out for his passing ability, technique and vision. His ability to penetrate any opposing team's defences with his passes led him to be called "The Man With The Killer Pass". Maurizio Gaudino compared Bein's passes to iron and his own boots like magnets, while Tony Yeboah noted his great chemistry with the midfielder. Jørn Andersen credited Bein for helping him become the top scorer in the 1989-90 season of the Bundesliga. Bein was also known for his iconic mustache. Overall, Bein made 70 assists in the Bundesliga, 62 of them with Frankfurt, being the top assist provider in three consecutive seasons.

== Career statistics ==
=== Club ===
Appearances and goals by club, season and competition
Club	Season	League			National Cup		League Cup		Continental		Total	
Club	Season	Division	Apps	Goals	Apps	Goals	Apps	Goals	Apps	Goals	Apps	Goals
Kickers Offenbach	1979–80	2. Bundesliga	9	1					–		9	1
Kickers Offenbach	1980–81	2. Bundesliga	38	25					–		38	25
Kickers Offenbach	1981–82	2. Bundesliga	35	12					–		35	12
Kickers Offenbach	1982–83	2. Bundesliga	37	20	1	1			–		38	21
Kickers Offenbach	1983–84	Bundesliga	34	14	1				–		35	14
Kickers Offenbach	Total		153	72	2	1			0	0	155	73
1. FC Köln	1984–85	Bundesliga	27	8	2				4	2	33	10
1. FC Köln	1985–86	Bundesliga	20	5					5	2	25	7
1. FC Köln	1986–87	Bundesliga	17	4	1				–		18	4
1. FC Köln	Total		64	17	3	0			9	4	76	21
Hamburger SV	1987–88	Bundesliga	24	7	3				4	0	31	7
Hamburger SV	1988–89	Bundesliga	28	15	3	1			–		31	16
Hamburger SV	Total		52	22	6	1			4	0	62	23
Eintracht Frankfurt	1989–90	Bundesliga	33	9	1				–		34	9
Eintracht Frankfurt	1990–91	Bundesliga	31	8	8				1	1	40	9
Eintracht Frankfurt	1991–92	Bundesliga	34	8	2	3			4	2	40	13
Eintracht Frankfurt	1992–93	Bundesliga	25	7	5				1	0	31	7
Eintracht Frankfurt	1993–94	Bundesliga	27	6	2	1			7	1	36	8
Eintracht Frankfurt	Total		150	38	18	4			13	4	181	46
Urawa Reds	1994	J1 League	10	2	0	0	2	0	–		12	2
Urawa Reds	1995	J1 League	38	18	3	2	-		–		41	20
Urawa Reds	1996	J1 League	20	5	4	2	7	1	–		31	8
Urawa Reds	Total		68	25	7	4	9	1	0	0	84	30
Total			487	174	36	10	9	1	26	8	558	193

=== International ===
Appearances and goals by national team and year
National team	Year	Apps	Goals
Germany	1989	2	0
Germany	1990	10	3
Germany	1991	1	0
Germany	1992	1	0
Germany	1993	3	0
Total		17	3

Scores and results list Germany's goal tally first, score column indicates score after each Bein goal.

List of international goals scored by Uwe Bein
No.	Date	Venue	Opponent	Score	Result	Competition
1	26 May 1990	Rheinstadion, Düsseldorf, Germany	Czechoslovakia	1–0	1–0	Friendly
2	15 June 1990	Stadio Giuseppe Meazza, Milan, Italy	United Arab Emirates	4–1	5–1	1990 FIFA World Cup Group D
3	31 October 1990	Josy Barthel Stadium, Luxembourg	Luxembourg	3–0	3–2	UEFA Euro 1992 qualifying

== Honours ==
Germany

- FIFA World Cup: 1990

Individual

- kicker Bundesliga Team of the Season: 1989–90, 1990–91, 1991–92, 1992–93
- Bundesliga top assist provider: 1990–91, 1991–92, 1992–93
