= Alexander Conrad =

German footballer

Personal information
- Date of birth: 15 November 1966 (age 59)
- Place of birth: Frankfurt am Main, West Germany
- Height: 1.84 m (6 ft 0 in)
- Position: Centre-back

Youth career
- Eintracht Frankfurt

Senior career*
Years	Team	Apps	(Gls)
1984–1988	Eintracht Frankfurt		
1988–1989	Borussia Dortmund		
1989–1990	1860 Munich		
1990–1991	Eintracht Frankfurt		
1991–1992	Rot-Weiß Erfurt		
1992–1997	FSV Frankfurt		

International career
- West Germany

Managerial career
- 2003–2007: KSV Klein-Karben
- 2007–2009: Waldhof Mannheim
- 2013–2016: Kickers Offenbach (assistant)
- 2017–2019: FSV Frankfurt
- * Club domestic league appearances and goals

Alexander Conrad (born 15 November 1966) is a German former professional footballer, who played as a centre-back, and later manager.
