= Frank Möller (footballer) =

German footballer

Personal information
- Date of birth: 11 July 1967 (age 59)
- Place of birth: Mainz, Germany
- Height: 1.85 m (6 ft 1 in)
- Position: Midfielder

Senior career*
Years	Team	Apps	(Gls)
1989–1991	1. FSV Mainz 05	54	(3)
1992–1994	Eintracht Frankfurt	16	(0)
1994–1995	1. FC Nürnberg	8	(1)
- * Club domestic league appearances and goals

Frank Möller (born 11 July 1967) is a retired German football player. He played 3 seasons in the Bundesliga with Eintracht Frankfurt.
