= Ralf Weber =

German former professional footballer (born 1969)

Personal information
- Full name: Ralf Weber
- Date of birth: 31 May 1969 (age 57)
- Place of birth: Seligenstadt, West Germany
- Height: 1.82 m (6 ft 0 in)
- Position: Midfielder

Youth career
- 1974–1982: SpVgg Hainstadt
- 1982–1987: Kickers Offenbach

Senior career*
Years	Team	Apps	(Gls)
1987–1989	Kickers Offenbach	51	(6)
1989–2001	Eintracht Frankfurt	214	(29)
Total		265	(35)

International career
1994–1995	Germany	9	(0)
- * Club domestic league appearances and goals

Ralf Weber (born 31 May 1969) is a German former professional footballer who played as a midfielder.

== Club career ==
Born in Seligenstadt, Ralf Weber started playing football in 1974 at SpVgg Hainstadt before moving to Kickers Offenbach in 1982. He started in the pro squad in 1987 where he appeared in 51 matches. After Offenbach failed to secure a license for the 2. Bundesliga he moved to local rival Eintracht Frankfurt in 1989. On 4 August 1989 he debuted for the Eagles away at Hamburger SV. The midfielder appeared in the first tier 182 times and in the second one 32 times for Frankfurt. In 2001, he finally retired after being plagued by many injuries. Between 1995 and 1997 he only could play two matches for Eintracht, and missed also all of the 2000–01 season, his final.

Legendary is his freaking out after the last fixture in 1991–92 when Frankfurt lost 1–2 against Hansa Rostock, losing the championship on the finishing line. Raging due to a not given penalty kick by referee Alfons Berg after a tackle to Weber by Rostock player Stefan Böger in the penalty box, Weber smashed a TV camera after the final whistle.

== International career ==
On 7 September 1994 he debuted for Germany against Russia. Up to 1995 he added nine caps.

== Post-playing career ==
For ten years, from 2004 to 2014, Weber worked as a scout for Eintracht Frankfurt.
