= Heinz Gründel =

German footballer (born 1957)

Personal information
- Full name: Heinz Gründel
- Date of birth: 13 February 1957 (age 69)
- Place of birth: West Berlin, West Germany
- Height: 1.78 m (5 ft 10 in)
- Position: Midfielder

Youth career
- 1964–1974: Rapide Wedding
- 1974–1977: Hertha BSC

Senior career*
Years	Team	Apps	(Gls)
1976–1978	Hertha BSC	8	(0)
1978–1982	Thor Waterschei	125	(29)
1982–1985	Standard Liège	93	(19)
1985–1988	Hamburger SV	62	(14)
1988–1993	Eintracht Frankfurt	91	(9)

International career
1985–1986	West Germany	4	(0)
- * Club domestic league appearances and goals

Heinz Gründel (born 13 February 1957 in Berlin) is a former German footballer.

== Club career ==
Gründel played in his entire career 161 matches in the Bundesliga and scored 24 goals.

With Hamburger SV Gründel won the DFB-Pokal in 1987 winning 3–1 against Stuttgarter Kickers.

== International career ==
The midfielder played for West Germany on four occasions. In 1986, he was called up by then manager Franz Beckenbauer to the 26 men pre-squad for the World Cup in Mexico. Finally, he was cut out, together with later 1990 World Champion Guido Buchwald.
