= Dietmar Roth =

German footballer

Personal information
- Full name: Dietmar Roth
- Date of birth: 16 September 1963 (age 63)
- Place of birth: Karlsruhe, West Germany
- Height: 1.80 m (5 ft 11 in)
- Position: Defender

Youth career
- –1979: FV Liedolsheim
- 1979–1983: Karlsruher SC

Senior career*
Years	Team	Apps	(Gls)
1983–1985	Karlsruher SC	59	(0)
1985–1987	Schalke 04	50	(0)
1987–1997	Eintracht Frankfurt	264	(5)
1997–1998	FSV Frankfurt		
1998–2001	Kickers Offenbach	36	(0)
2005	VfR Kesselstadt		
- * Club domestic league appearances and goals

Dietmar Roth (born 16 September 1963 in Karlsruhe, Baden-Württemberg) is a German former professional footballer who played as a defender.

== Honours ==
Eintracht Frankfurt

- DFB-Pokal: 1987–88
