= Stefan Studer =

German footballer (born 1964)

Personal information
- Full name: Stefan Studer
- Date of birth: January 30, 1964 (age 62)
- Place of birth: Buxtehude, Germany
- Height: 1.78 m (5 ft 10 in)
- Positions: Defender; midfielder

Youth career
- –1978: PSV Buxtehude
- 1978–1981: TV Hausbruch-Neugraben
- 1981–1982: Hamburger SV
- 1982–1984: FC St. Pauli

Senior career*
Years	Team	Apps	(Gls)
1984–1988	FC St. Pauli		
1988–1993	Eintracht Frankfurt	128	(9)
1993–1994	SG Wattenscheid 09	26	(0)
1994–1995	Hannover 96	32	(4)
1995–1998	Hansa Rostock	89	(6)
- * Club domestic league appearances and goals

Stefan Studer (born January 30, 1964) is a German former professional footballer who played as a defender or midfielder.
