= Jørn Andersen =

Norwegian-German football player and manager

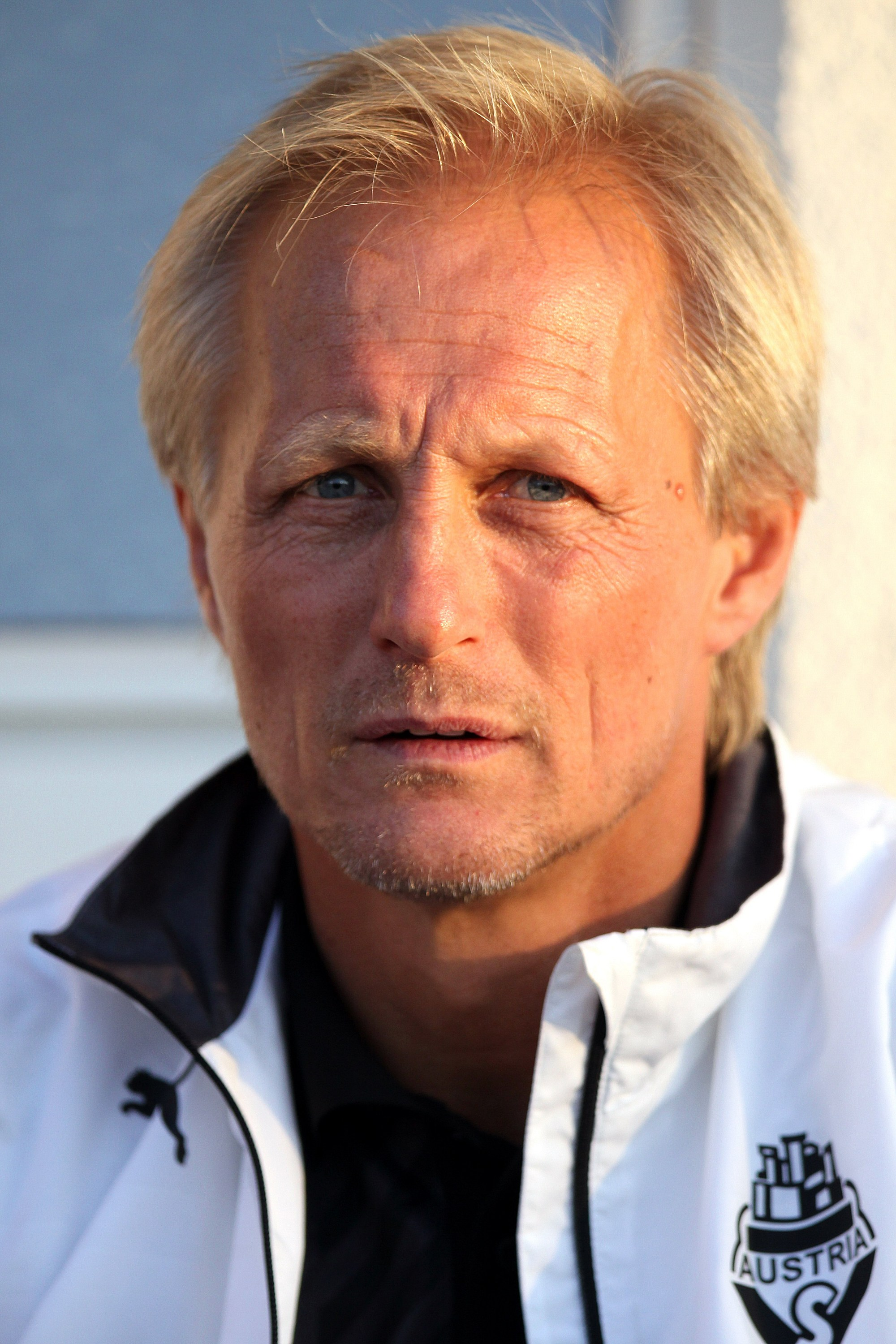
- Andersen as Austria Salzburg manager in 2015

Personal information
- Date of birth: 3 February 1963 (age 63)
- Place of birth: Fredrikstad, Norway
- Position: Striker

Team information
- Current team: Myanmar (head coach)

Youth career
- 1975–1982: Østsiden

Senior career*
Years	Team	Apps	(Gls)
1982–1984	Fredrikstad	64	(25)
1985	Vålerenga	22	(23)
1985–1988	1. FC Nürnberg	78	(28)
1988–1990	Eintracht Frankfurt	54	(20)
1990–1991	Fortuna Düsseldorf	42	(5)
1991–1994	Eintracht Frankfurt	44	(13)
1994–1995	Hamburger SV	18	(1)
1995	Dynamo Dresden	7	(0)
1995–1997	Zürich	53	(2)
1997–1999	Lugano	43	(2)
1999–2001	Locarno	29	(0)
Total		454	(119)

International career
1985–1990	Norway	27	(5)

Managerial career
- 2003–2004: Rot-Weiß Oberhausen
- 2007: Skoda Xanthi
- 2007–2008: Kickers Offenbach
- 2008–2009: Mainz 05
- 2010–2011: AEL
- 2011–2012: Karlsruher SC
- 2015: Austria Salzburg
- 2016–2018: North Korea
- 2018–2019: Incheon United
- 2021–2024: Hong Kong
- 2024–2025: Yunnan Yukun
- 2026–: Myanmar
- * Club domestic league appearances and goals

Jørn Andersen (born 3 February 1963), sometimes written as Jörn Andersen, is a Norwegian professional football manager and former player who is currently the head coach of the Myanmar national team.

== Club career ==
=== Norway ===
Born in Fredrikstad, Andersen's career started at local team Østsiden where he remained until 1982. Subsequently, he moved to Fredrikstad and netted seven goals in 43 Norwegian Premier League appearances. The striker was transferred to Vålerenga ahead of the 1985 season. Andersen was able to score 23 goals in just 22 matches for the Oslo side.

=== Germany ===
In 1985, 1. FC Nürnberg signed the Norwegian. In 78 matches Andersen scored 28 goals before he moved to Eintracht Frankfurt. In 1990 Andersen became the first foreign player in the Bundesliga to be top goal-scorer in a season, with 18 goals. In 1990–91, Andersen played for Fortuna Düsseldorf and returned to the Frankfurt side. After that spell he joined Hamburger SV (1994–95) and Dynamo Dresden to play in the Bundesliga.

=== Switzerland ===
From Dresden, Andersen headed to Switzerland and FC Zürich in 1995, but was not successful as he scored only twice in 33 appearances. After the 1997–98 season he left FC Lugano to join FC Locarno.

== International career ==
Andersen made his debut for the Norway national team in 1985 and earned 27 caps, scoring five goals. His last international match was a European Championship qualifying match against Hungary in October 1990, coming on as a substitute for Jahn Ivar Jakobsen.

== Managerial career ==
=== European years ===
Andersen became the youth manager of FC Luzern and returned to Germany again to manage the then-second-tier team Rot-Weiß Oberhausen from 2003 until 2004. After that spell he assisted Horst Köppel at Borussia Mönchengladbach.

In May 2007, he signed to Greek top-flight team Skoda Xanthi to manage them until 2008, but in June 2007 the contract was dissolved for private reasons.

In late 2007, he signed for 2. Bundesliga strugglers Kickers Offenbach, but was unable to save them from relegation.

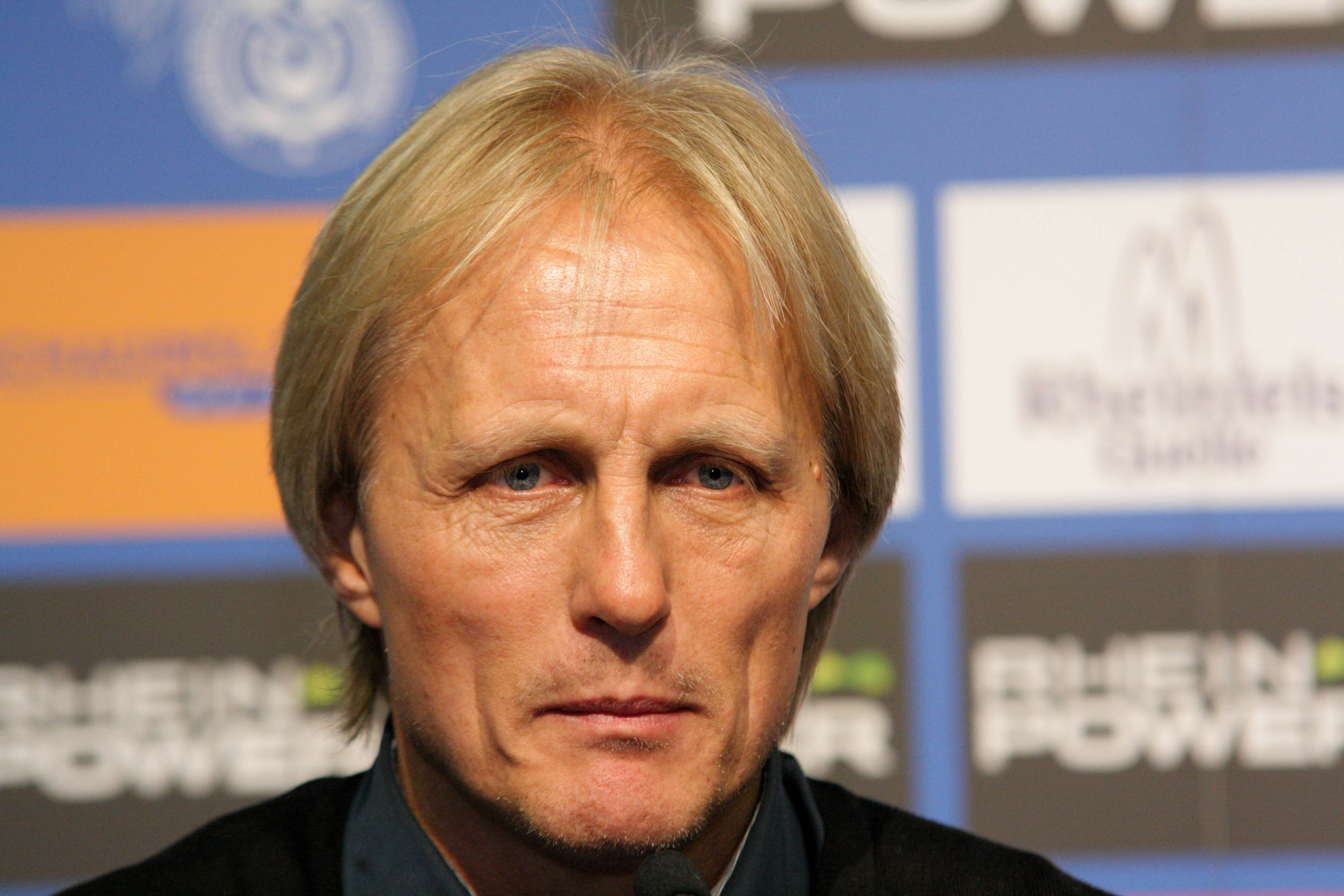
Andersen as Karlsruher SC manager during a press conference in December 2011

On 20 May 2008, he signed a two-year deal with 2. Bundesliga club Mainz 05. Under his reign, the team placed second in the league, and successfully won promotion to the Bundesliga.

In December 2010, he was named manager of the Super League Greece team AEL. After 24 days where the team lost three league matches and was knocked out of the cup competition, without scoring a single goal, he was let go.

Six months later, Andersen returned to Germany to take charge of second division side Karlsruher SC. In this role, he handed the young Hakan Çalhanoğlu his senior debut.

Andersen became manager of Austria Salzburg on 2 January 2015.

=== Move to Asia ===
==== Korea ====
After leaving Austria Salzburg in December 2015, Andersen was appointed as manager of the North Korea national team in May 2016. It marked the first time North Korea had appointed a foreign manager since 1993. In 2018, he departed from North Korea after two years working with the team.

In March 2018, he was reportedly linked to Hong Kong, but did not end up taking the job.

In June 2018, he was announced as the new manager of South Korean side Incheon United in the K-League. He was sacked on 15 April 2019 with Incheon at the bottom of the table after collecting just four points from seven matches.

==== Hong Kong ====
In December 2021, Andersen was appointed as the head coach of Hong Kong, succeeding Mixu Paatelainen.

In June 2022, he successfully led the Hong Kong team to qualify for the 2023 AFC Asian Cup, which was the first time since 1968.

He also led the Hong Kong under-23 team during the 2022 Asian Games, where they achieved a significant milestone by defeating four-time champion Iran. This victory propelled them into the semi-finals for the first time in history.

On 1 January 2024, Andersen led Hong Kong to a historic victory, defeating China 2–1 in an international friendly. This win marked the first triumph in 39 years for Hong Kong over China.

==== China ====
On 12 June 2024, he was confirmed as head coach of China League One team Yunnan Yukun and signed an 18-month contract with the club.

On 6 October, Yunnan earned promotion to the Chinese Super League with 4 rounds to spare.

==== Myanmar ====
On 9 July 2026, Andersen was appointed as the new head coach of Myanmar.

== Personal life ==
He is the son of handball player Bjørg Andersen.

Andersen became a German citizen in 1993. His son, Niklas, is also a former Bundesliga player. Andersen is married and lives in Bad Reichenhall in Bavaria, Germany.

== Managerial statistics ==
As of match played 27 September 2026

Managerial record by team and tenure
Team	Nat.	From	To	Record					Ref.
Team	Nat.	From	To	G	W	D	L	Win %	Ref.
Rot-Weiß Oberhausen	(Germany)	1 July 2003	28 October 2004	47	18	10	19	38.30	
Kickers Offenbach	(Germany)	6 November 2007	30 June 2008	22	5	9	8	22.73	
Mainz 05	(Germany)	1 July 2008	3 August 2009	40	22	9	9	55.00	
AEL	(Greece)	17 December 2010	9 January 2011	4	0	0	4	0.00	
Karlsruher SC	(Germany)	6 November 2011	26 March 2012	13	2	2	9	15.38	
Austria Salzburg	(Austria)	2 January 2015	2 December 2015	35	16	9	10	45.71	
North Korea	(North Korea)	11 May 2016	27 March 2018	15	8	4	3	53.33	
Incheon United	(South Korea)	9 June 2018	15 April 2019	33	11	8	14	33.33	
Hong Kong	(Hong Kong)	13 December 2021	29 May 2024	25	6	4	15	24.00	
Yunnan Yukun	(China)	3 June 2024	31 December 2025	53	26	12	15	49.06	
Myanmar	(Myanmar)	8 July 2026	Present	7	3	0	4	42.86	
Career Total				294	117	67	110	39.80	

== Honours ==
Individual

- Norwegian Premier League top scorer: 1985
- Bundesliga top scorer: 1990
