= Manfred Binz =

German footballer

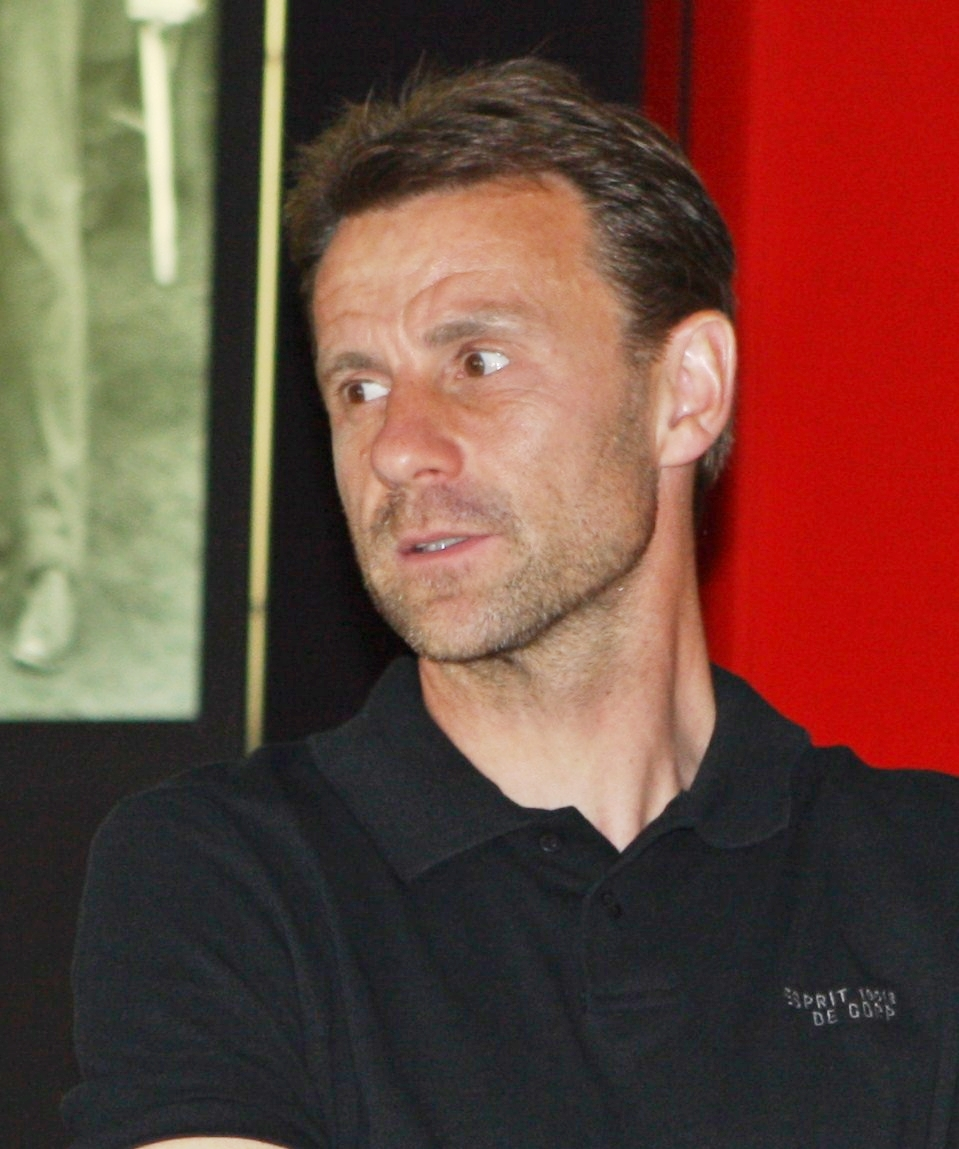
- Binz in 2008

Personal information
- Date of birth: 22 September 1965 (age 61)
- Place of birth: Frankfurt, West Germany
- Height: 1.82 m (6 ft 0 in)
- Positions: Defender; sweeper

Team information
- Current team: FC Germania 1911 Enkheim

Youth career
- –1979: VfR Bockenheim
- 1979–1985: Eintracht Frankfurt

Senior career*
Years	Team	Apps	(Gls)
1985–1996	Eintracht Frankfurt	336	(26)
1996–1998	Brescia	44	(3)
1998–1999	Borussia Dortmund	13	(0)
1999–2002	Kickers Offenbach	68	(7)
2002–2003	Eintracht Frankfurt U23	8	(0)
2003	KSV Klein-Karben	6	(0)
Total		475	(36)

International career
1987–1990	West Germany U-21	9	(0)
1990–1992	Germany	14	(1)

Managerial career
- 2004: Kickers Offenbach (caretaker)
- 2011: Kickers Offenbach (caretaker)
Medal record
Men's football
Representing Germany
UEFA European Championship
Runner-up	1992 Sweden
- * Club domestic league appearances and goals

Manfred Binz (22 September 1965) is a German former professional footballer who played as a defender. He is the assistant manager of SC Hessen Dreieich.

== Club career ==
Binz was born in Frankfurt. In his active career, the sweeper won the DFB-Pokal with Eintracht Frankfurt. Having made his debut on 2 March 1985, he became the undisputed chief of the Frankfurt defence in the 1986–87 season and appeared in 246 Bundesliga games in a row. Although Frankfurt was always a championship contender at the beginning of the 1990s, Binz failed to win the Bundesliga with the eagles. Finally, the national cup victory was the highlight of his active career.

After being eliminated in the UEFA cup in March 1994, he fell out with manager Klaus Toppmöller, causing the slow departure of the sweeper. The situation calmed down, but in 1996, he left Eintracht Frankfurt for Italian side Brescia Calcio, playing in Serie B with whom he was immediately promoted to Serie A. In the winter break 1997–98, he returned to the Bundesliga, signing at Borussia Dortmund, slowly fading his pro career and making his Bundesliga appearance on 14 August 1998.

== International career ==
Binz won his first cap after the World Cup 1990 in a friendly match against Portugal. He was part of the Germany national team that finished runners-up at UEFA Euro 1992.

== Honours ==
Eintracht Frankfurt

- DFB-Pokal: 1987–88

Germany

- UEFA European Football Championship: runner-up 1992
