= Karl-Josef Assenmacher =

German football referee

- Born: 30 May 1947 (age 79); Hürth, Germany

Domestic
Years	League	Role
1976–1994	2. Bundesliga, Bundesliga	Referee
1978–1994	Bundesliga	Referee

International
Years	League	Role
1983–1993	FIFA listed	Referee

Karl-Josef Assenmacher (born 30 May 1947) is a German former referee.

== Career ==
Assenmacher, born in Hürth, Germany, has officiated a total of 153 games in the Bundesliga and 99 games in the 2. Bundesliga. From 1983 to 1993, he was a FIFA referee and refereed 18 European Cup games, including the 1993 European Cup Winners' Cup Final between Parma of Italy and Antwerp of Belgium, held at Wembley Stadium in London, England, on 12 May 1993.

His career was marked by his refereeing of the World Cup qualifying game, held on 13 October 1993 at Rotterdam, between Netherlands and England. The game ended with the Netherlands winning 2–0. The result meant that England would not qualify for the 1994 FIFA World Cup and caused English coach Graham Taylor to resign his post. Subsequently, Taylor, as well as most English media, criticized severely some of the referee's decisions in that game.

Late in the second half, with the game at 0–0, David Platt was fouled by Ronald Koeman as he raced in clear on goal. The German referee failed to apply the rule of sending the Dutch player off for a "professional foul," and showed him only a yellow card. The Dutch players charged down the free kick, "encroaching the kicker" and the shot was blocked, while the referee waved play to carry on. Minutes later, Ronald Koeman took a similar free kick outside England's penalty area. His first shot was blocked, and one England player was booked for encroaching. The free kick was ordered retaken and Koeman scored at the second attempt. Dennis Bergkamp scored the Netherlands' second goal allegedly "using his arm to control the ball." However, two minutes before half-time, England were said to have been fortunate because a Frank Rijkaard goal was ruled out for offside, even though replays showed the goal was legitimate.

A week after the game, on 20 October 1993, FIFA issued a statement to the effect that Assenmacher who was scheduled to referee the World Cup qualifier between Belgium and Czechoslovakia on 17 November, would be replaced by another German referee, Hellmut Krug. The statement read, "After analysing the performance of [Assenmacher], the Fifa Referees' Committee has decided to replace him with Krug." Assenmacher would not officiate an international game again.

== Retirement ==
Assenmacher is an expert table tennis player. He has won the 2003 and 2008 Table Tennis World Master Series.

== See also ==
- Michel Kitabdjian
