= 1986–87 Borussia Mönchengladbach season =

Borussia Mönchengladbach
1986-87 season
- Manager: Jupp Heynckes
- Stadium: Bökelbergstadion
- Bundesliga: 3rd
- DFB-Pokal: Semi-finals
- UEFA Cup: Semi-finals
- Top goalscorer: League: Uwe Rahn (24 goals); All: Uwe Rahn (34 goals)
- Average home league attendance: 23,375
- Biggest win: 9–2 v. Bayer 05 Uerdingen (H); 7 March 1987
- Biggest defeat: 0-4 v. Eintracht Frankfurt (A); 4 April 1987

In the 1986–87 season, Borussia Mönchengladbach reached third place in the Bundesliga, ending the season with 43 points. They also reached the semi-finals of the DFB-Pokal and the UEFA Cup, losing to Hamburger SV and Dundee United.

It was the club's 19th consecutive season in the Bundesliga. After the end of the season, coach and former club player Jupp Heynckes left Mönchengladbach to become the coach of Bayern Munich. League top scorer Uwe Rahn won the Footballer of the Year for his performances throughout the season.

== Squad ==
Note: Flags indicate national team as defined under FIFA eligibility rules; some limited exceptions apply. Players may hold more than one non-FIFA nationality.

No.	Pos.	Nation	Player
—	GK	GER	Uwe Kamps
—	GK	NOR	Erik Thorstvedt
—	DF	GER	Uli Borowka
—	DF	GER	Hans-Günter Bruns
—	DF	GER	Thomas Eichin
—	DF	GER	Michael Frontzeck
—	DF	AUT	Bernd Krauss
—	DF	GER	Thomas Krisp
—	DF	GER	Richard Sieburg
—	MF	GER	Dirk Bakalorz
—	MF	GER	Andreas Brandts
—	MF	GER	Hans-Georg Dreßen
—	MF	GER	Kai Erik Herlovsen
—	MF	GER	Christian Hochstätter
—	MF	GER	André Winkhold

No.	Pos.	Nation	Player
—	FW	GER	Christoph Budde
—	FW	GER	Hans-Jörg Criens
—	FW	GER	Ewald Lienen
—	FW	GER	Uwe Rahn
—	FW	GER	Günter Thiele

== Competitions ==
=== Bundesliga ===
==== League table ====
Pos	Team	Pld	W	D	L	GF	GA	GD	Pts	Qualification or relegation
1	Bayern Munich (C)	34	20	13	1	67	31	+36	53	Qualification to European Cup first round
2	Hamburger SV	34	19	9	6	69	37	+32	47	Qualification to Cup Winners' Cup first round
3	Borussia Mönchengladbach	34	18	7	9	74	44	+30	43	Qualification to UEFA Cup first round (Note: As Hamburger SV qualified for the Cup Winners' Cup, their UEFA Cup spot was transferred to Leverkusen.)
4	Borussia Dortmund	34	15	10	9	70	50	+20	40	Qualification to UEFA Cup first round
5	Werder Bremen	34	17	6	11	65	54	+11	40	Qualification to UEFA Cup first round

Source: www.dfb.de
Rules for classification: 1) points; 2) goal difference; 3) number of goals scored.
(C) Champions

==== Matches ====
16 August 1986 2	Kaiserslautern	1-1	Borussia Mönchengladbach	Fritz-Walter-Stadion, Kaiserslautern
15:30	Wuttke 65'	Report	Dreßen 26'	Attendance: 32,000; Referee: Rainer Jupe

19 August 1986 1	Borussia Mönchengladbach	0-3	Hamburg	Bökelbergstadion, Mönchengladbach
20:00		Report	Homp 77', 83' von Heesen 81'	Attendance: 23,500; Referee: Norbert Brückner

23 August 1986 3	Blau-Weiß 90 Berlin	3-2	Borussia Mönchengladbach	Olympiastadion, Berlin
15:30	Flad 18'; Riedle 81', 90+1'	Report	Dreßen 7'; Frontzeck 45'	Attendance: 33,000; Referee: Manfred Neuner

2 September 1986 4	Borussia Mönchengladbach	1-2	Werder Bremen	Bökelbergstadion, Mönchengladbach
20:00	Thiele 40'	Report	Kutzop 6' (pen.), 81' (pen.)	Attendance: 22,000; Referee: Hans-Peter Dellwing

6 September 1986 5	Bochum	1-1	Borussia Mönchengladbach	Ruhrstadion, Bochum
15:30	Lameck 35' (pen.)	Report	Thiele 65'	Attendance: 18,000; Referee: Wolf-Günter Wiesel

13 September 1986 6	Borussia Mönchengladbach	1-1	Eintracht Frankfurt	Bökelbergstadion, Mönchengladbach
15:30	Ruhn 61' (pen.)	Report	Körbel 68'	Attendance: 12,500; Referee: Horst-Peter Bruch

20 September 1986 7	Bayern Munich	3-1	Borussia Mönchengladbach	Olympiastadion, Munich
15:30	Pflügler 45'; Matthäus 55'; Wohlfarth 58'	Report	Rahn 68'	Attendance: 64,000; Referee: Hans-Joachim Osmers

27 September 1986 8	Borussia Mönchengladbach	2-1	Bayer Leverkusen	Bökelbergstadion, Mönchengladbach
15:30	Thiele 18'; Bruns 33'	Report	Winkhold 58' (o.g.)	Attendance: 18,000; Referee: Siegfried Brehm

4 October 1986 9	Waldhof Mannheim	1-1	Borussia Mönchengladbach	Südweststadion, Ludwigshafen
15:30	Bührer 22'	Report	Lienen 51'	Attendance: 16,000; Referee: Hans-Heinrich Barnick

11 October 1986 10	Borussia Mönchengladbach	5-0	Homburg	Bökelbergstadion, Mönchengladbach
15:30	Lienen 52'; Thiele 57', 70'; Rahn 64', 88'	Report		Attendance: 12,000; Referee: Wolfgang Mierswa

18 October 1986 11	Bayer Uerdingen	1-1	Borussia Mönchengladbach	Grotenburg-Stadion, Krefeld
15:30	Thommessen 49'	Report	Rahn 74'	Attendance: 26,000; Referee: Rainer Boos

1 November 1986 12	Borussia Mönchengladbach	4-0	Stuttgart	Bökelbergstadion, Mönchengladbach
18:00	Rahn 44'; Thiele 63'; Borowka 81'; Criens 90'	Report		Attendance: 24,000; Referee: Gerhard Theobald

8 November 1986 13	Schalke 04	1-2	Borussia Mönchengladbach	Parkstadion, Gelsenkirchen
15:30	Wegmann 58'	Report	Rahn 61'; Frontzeck 85'	Attendance: 27,500; Referee: Hans Scheuerer

15 November 1986 14	Borussia Mönchengladbach	2-2	Borussia Dortmund	Bökelbergstadion, Mönchengladbach
15:30	Rahn 38', 85'	Report	Dickel 12'; Storck 90'	Attendance: 22,000; Referee: Joachim Kautschor

22 November 1986 15	Fortuna Düsseldorf	1-1	Borussia Mönchengladbach	Rheinstadion, Düsseldorf
15:30	Weikl 38'	Report	Dreßen 82'	Attendance: 30,000; Referee: Hans-Peter Schäfer

29 November 1986 16	Borussia Mönchengladbach	3-1	Köln	Bökelbergstadion, Mönchengladbach
15:30	Bakalorz 12'; Hochstätter 22', 30'	Report	Lehnhoff 90'	Attendance: 31,000; Referee: Aron Schmidhuber

6 December 1986 17	Nürnberg	2-0	Borussia Mönchengladbach	Frankenstadion, Nuremberg
15:30	Andersen 50'; Lieberwirth 84'	Report		Attendance: 41,300; Referee: Anton Matheis

21 February 1987 18	Hamburg	3-1	Borussia Mönchengladbach	Volksparkstadion, Hamburg
15:30	Jusufi 44'; Schmöller 53', 57'	Report	Frontzeck 20'	Attendance: 28,500; Referee: Peter Gabor

28 February 1987 19	Borussia Mönchengladbach	0-1	Kaiserslautern	Bökelbergstadion, Mönchengladbach
15:30		Report	Hartmann 16'	Attendance: 13,500; Referee: Manfred Neuner

14 March 1987 20	Borussia Mönchengladbach	2-1	Blau-Weiß 90 Berlin	Bökelbergstadion, Mönchengladbach
15:30	Frontzeck 31' (pen.); Criens 71'	Report	Schüler 87'	Attendance: 12,000; Referee: Helmut Reinstädtler

21 March 1987 21	Werder Bremen	1-7	Borussia Mönchengladbach	Weserstadion, Bremen
15:30	Pezzey 65'	Report	Dreßen 40'; Rahn 48'; Hochstätter 50'; Criens 57', 74'; Bakalorz 66'; Krauss 82'	Attendance: 28,960; Referee: Karl-Heinz Tritschler

28 March 1987 22	Borussia Mönchengladbach	2-1	Bochum	Bökelbergstadion, Mönchengladbach
15:30	Criens 17'; Hochstätter 34'	Report	Knäbel 45'	Attendance: 12,000; Referee: Manfred Amerell

4 April 1987 23	Eintracht Frankfurt	4-0	Borussia Mönchengladbach	Frankfurt, Frankfurt
15:30	Turowski 53', 61'; Thiele 65' (o.g.); Mitchell 87'	Report		Attendance: 21,000; Referee: Werner Föckler

11 April 1987 24	Borussia Mönchengladbach	0-1	Bayern Munich	Bökelbergstadion, Mönchengladbach
15:30		Report	Hoeneß 35'	Attendance: 33,000; Referee: Gerd Zimmermann

15 April 1987 25	Bayer Leverkusen	0-2	Borussia Mönchengladbach	Ulrich-Haberland-Stadion, Leverkusen
20:00		Report	Herlovsen 32'; Thiele 55'	Attendance: 15,000; Referee: Siegfried Brehm

25 April 1987 26	Borussia Mönchengladbach	7-2	Waldhof Mannheim	Bökelbergstadion, Mönchengladbach
15:30	Rahn 3', 14', 43' (pen.), 83'; Criens 51', 87'; Borowka 86'	Report	Walter 3'; Trieb 64'	Attendance: 6,000; Referee: Anton Matheis

2 May 1987 27	Homburg	0-2	Borussia Mönchengladbach	Waldstadion, Homburg
15:30		Report	Rahn 23'; Winkhold 44'	Attendance: 13,000; Referee: Manfred Neuner

9 May 1987 28	Borussia Mönchengladbach	2-0	Bayer Uerdingen	Bökelbergstadion, Mönchengladbach
15:30	Hochstätter 39'; Thiele 58'	Report		Attendance: 12,000; Referee: Karl-Josef Assenmacher

15 May 1987 29	Stuttgart	2-4	Borussia Mönchengladbach	Neckarstadion, Stuttgart
20:00	Merkle 48', 77'	Report	Hochstätter 17'; Bruns 54'; Rahn 59', 85'	Attendance: 20,000; Referee: Heinz Werner

23 May 1987 30	Borussia Mönchengladbach	3-1	Schalke 04	Bökelbergstadion, Mönchengladbach
15:30	Hochstätter 59'; Rahn 63', 74' (pen.)	Report	Marquardt 58'	Attendance: 17,500; Referee: Karl-Heinz Tritschler

30 May 1987 31	Borussia Dortmund	0-2	Borussia Mönchengladbach	Westfalenstadion, Dortmund
15:30		Report	Hochstätter 14'; Rahn 32'	Attendance: 54,000; Referee: Werner Föckler

6 June 1987 32	Borussia Mönchengladbach	4-1	Fortuna Düsseldorf	Bökelbergstadion, Mönchengladbach
15:30	Hochstätter 10'; Borowka 35'; Weikl 46' (o.g.); Bruns 71'	Report	Dusend 89'	Attendance: 12,000; Referee: Bernd Kruse

13 June 1987 33	Köln	2-4	Borussia Mönchengladbach	Müngersdorfer Stadion, Cologne
15:30	K. Allofs 35'; Woodcock 68'	Report	Hochstätter 27'; Rahn 31', 75'; Thiele 80'	Attendance: 30,000; Referee: Manfred Neuner

17 June 1987 34	Borussia Mönchengladbach	4-0	Nürnberg	Bökelbergstadion, Mönchengladbach
15:30	Rahn 18', 49'; Dreßen 26'; Frontzeck 69'	Report		Attendance: 13,500; Referee: Gerd Zimmermann

=== DFB-Pokal ===
30 August 1986 First round	Amberg	0-7	Borussia Mönchengladbach	Am Schanzl, Amberg
15:00		Report	Rahn 8', 39', 51'; Thiele 53', 87'; Bruns 68'; Lienen 73'	Attendance: 6,596; Referee: Peter Correll

26 October 1986 Second round	Borussia Mönchengladbach	6-1	Borussia Dortmund	Bökelbergstadion, Mönchengladbach
18:00	Bakalorz 8'; Thiele 22'; Rahn 29'; Borowka 31'; Brandts 86'	Report	Helmer 17'	Attendance: 25,000; Referee: Heinz Werner

19 November 1986 Round of 16	Alemannia Aachen	0-2 (a.e.t.)	Borussia Mönchengladbach	Tivoli, Aachen
15:30		Report	Bakalorz 99', 111'	Attendance: 26,200; Referee: Karl-Heinz Tritschler

7 March 1987 Quarter-final	Borussia Mönchengladbach	9-2	Bayer Uerdingen	Bökelbergstadion, Mönchengladbach
15:30	Criens 18', 25'; Dreßen 45', 76'; Rahn 49', 90'; Bruns 50'; Krauss 61'; Hochstätter 88'	Report	Kuntz 17'; Witeczek 68'	Attendance: 26,000; Referee: Wolf-Günter Wiesel

31 March 1987 Semi-final	Hamburg	1-0	Borussia Mönchengladbach	Volksparkstadion, Hamburg
20:15	Kastl 85'	Report		Attendance: 45,000; Referee: Aron Schmidhuber

=== UEFA Cup ===
==== First round ====
16 September 1986 First leg	Borussia Mönchengladbach (West Germany)	1-0	(Socialist Federal Republic of Yugoslavia) Partizan	Bökelbergstadion, Mönchengladbach
20:15	Krauss 24'	Report		Attendance: 5,300; Referee: Lajos Németh (Hungary)

1 October 1986 Second leg	Partizan (Socialist Federal Republic of Yugoslavia)	1-3	(West Germany) Borussia Mönchengladbach	Stadion JNA, Belgrade
16:00	Vučićević 47'	Report	Dreßen 27'; Brandts 82'; Lienen 85'	Attendance: 42,000; Referee: Robert Wurtz (France)

==== Second round ====
22 October 1986 First leg	Borussia Mönchengladbach (West Germany)	5-1	(Netherlands) Feyenoord	Bökelbergstadion, Mönchengladbach
20:00	Dreßen 18', 44'; Rahn 53'; Bruns 68'; Thiele 79'	Report	Elstrup 43'	Attendance: 18,440; Referee: Victoriano Sánchez Arminio (Spain)

5 November 1986 Second leg	Feyenoord (Netherlands)	0-2	(West Germany) Borussia Mönchengladbach	De Kuip, Rotterdam
20:00		Report	Rahn 37' (pen.), 89'	Attendance: 14,616; Referee: Erik Fredriksson (Sweden)

==== Third round ====
26 November 1986 First leg	Rangers (Scotland)	1-1	(West Germany) Borussia Mönchengladbach	Ibrox Park, Glasgow
20:30	Durrant 14'	Report	Rahn 45'	Attendance: 42,000; Referee: Paolo Casarin (Italy)

10 December 1986 Second leg	Borussia Mönchengladbach (West Germany)	0-0	(Scotland) Rangers F.C.	Bökelbergstadion, Mönchengladbach
19:30		Report		Attendance: 34,000; Referee: Alexis Ponnet (Belgium)

==== Quarter-final ====
4 March 1987 First leg	Borussia Mönchengladbach (West Germany)	3-0	(Portugal) Vitória de Guimarães	Bökelbergstadion, Mönchengladbach
20:00	Criens 9'; Krauss 41'; Heitor 67' (o.g.)	Report		Attendance: 16,500; Referee: Einar Halle (Norway)

18 March 1987 Second leg	Vitória de Guimarães (Portugal)	2–2	(West Germany) Borussia Mönchengladbach	Estádio D. Afonso Henriques, Guimarães
17:00	Cascavel 36'; Ademir Alcântara 70'	Report	Bakalorz 30'; Heitor 85' (o.g.)	Attendance: 12,000; Referee: Bob Valentine (Scotland)

==== Semi-final ====
8 April 1987 First leg	Dundee United (Scotland)	0-0	(West Germany) Borussia Mönchengladbach	Tannadice Park, Dundee
21:00		Report		Attendance: 15,789; Referee: Marcel Van Langenhove (Belgium)

22 April 1987 Second leg	Borussia Mönchengladbach (West Germany)	0-2	(Scotland) Dundee United	Bökelbergstadion, Mönchengladbach
20:05		Report	Ferguson 43'; Redford 90'	Attendance: 33,400; Referee: José dos Santos (Portugal)
