= 1986–87 Borussia Dortmund season =

Borussia Dortmund
1986-87 season
- Manager: Reinhard Saftig
- Stadium: Westfalenstadion
- Bundesliga: 4th
- DFB-Pokal: Second round
- Top goalscorer: League: Norbert Dickel (20 goals); All: Norbert Dickel (22 goals)

After an underwhelming 1985–86 season where it avoided relegation to the 2. Bundesliga by winning against 2. Bundesliga club Fortuna Köln in relegation/promotion play-offs, Borussia Dortmund had an excellent campaign in the Bundesliga by finishing in fourth place with 40 points, getting an advantage over SV Werder Bremen due to goal difference.

== Squad ==
Note: Flags indicate national team as defined under FIFA eligibility rules; some limited exceptions apply. Players may hold more than one non-FIFA nationality.

No.	Pos.	Nation	Player
—	GK	GER	Wolfgang de Beer
—	DF	GER	Andreas Hahn
—	DF	GER	Thomas Helmer
—	DF	GER	Dirk Hupe
—	DF	GER	Günter Kukowski
—	DF	GER	Michael Lusch
—	DF	GER	Adrian Spryka
—	DF	GER	Bernd Storck
—	MF	GER	Ingo Anderbrügge
—	MF	GER	Ulrich Bittcher
—	MF	GER	Frank Pagelsdorf
—	MF	ROU	Marcel Răducanu
—	MF	GER	Michael Zorc

No.	Pos.	Nation	Player
—	FW	GER	Maurice Banach
—	FW	GER	Norbert Dickel
—	FW	TUR	Erdal Keser
—	FW	GER	Frank Mill
—	FW	GER	Daniel Simmes

== Competitions ==
=== Bundesliga ===
==== League table ====
Pos	Team	Pld	W	D	L	GF	GA	GD	Pts	Qualification or relegation
2	Hamburger SV	34	19	9	6	69	37	+32	47	Qualification to Cup Winners' Cup first round
3	Borussia Mönchengladbach	34	18	7	9	74	44	+30	43	Qualification to UEFA Cup first round (Note: As Hamburger SV qualified for the Cup Winners' Cup, their UEFA Cup spot was transferred to Leverkusen.)
4	Borussia Dortmund	34	15	10	9	70	50	+20	40	Qualification to UEFA Cup first round
5	Werder Bremen	34	17	6	11	65	54	+11	40	Qualification to UEFA Cup first round
6	Bayer Leverkusen	34	16	7	11	56	38	+18	39	Qualification to UEFA Cup first round

Source: www.dfb.de
Rules for classification: 1) points; 2) goal difference; 3) number of goals scored.

==== Matches ====
9 August 1986 1	Bayern Munich	2-2	Borussia Dortmund	Olympiastadion, Munich
15:30	Wohlfarth 1'; Matthäus 50'	Report	Simmes 30'; Zorc 70'	Attendance: 31,000; Referee: Peter Gabor

15 August 1986 2	Borussia Dortmund	0-0	Bayer Leverkusen	Westfalenstadion, Dortmund
20:00		Report		Attendance: 32,500; Referee: Hans Scheuerer

23 August 1986 3	Mannheim	2-1	Borussia Dortmund	Südweststadion, Ludwigshafen
15:30	Gaudino 52'; Bührer 61'	Report	Pagelsdorf 61'	Attendance: 10,000; Referee: Horst-Peter Bruch

2 September 1986 4	Borussia Dortmund	3-0	Homburg	Westfalenstadion, Dortmund
20:00	Răducanu 25'; Keser 56'; Wójcicki 80'	Report		Attendance: 22,500; Referee: Hans-Heinrich Barnick

6 September 1986 5	Uerdingen	2-4	Borussia Dortmund	Grotenburg-Stadion, Krefeld
15:30	Herget 33'; Funkel 46'	Report	Mill 31', 35', 88'; Dickel 83'	Attendance: 13,000; Referee: Anton Matheis

13 September 1986 6	Borussia Dortmund	1-2	Stuttgart	Westfalenstadion, Dortmund
15:30	Răducanu 82'	Report	Hartmann 17'; Klinsmann 52'	Attendance: 36,500; Referee: Gerhard Theobald

20 September 1986 7	Schalke 04	2-1	Borussia Dortmund	Parkstadion, Gelsenkirchen
15:30	Kleppinger 62', 84'	Report	Pagelsdorf 59'	Attendance: 44,500; Referee: Norbert Brückner

27 September 1986 8	Borussia Mönchengladbach	2-1	Bayer Leverkusen	Bökelbergstadion, Mönchengladbach
15:30	Thiele 18'; Bruns 33'	Report	Winkhold 58' (o.g.)	Attendance: 18,000; Referee: Siegfried Brehm

4 October 1986 9	Waldhof Mannheim	1-1	Borussia Mönchengladbach	Südweststadion, Ludwigshafen
15:30	Bührer 22'	Report	Lienen 51'	Attendance: 16,000; Referee: Hans-Heinrich Barnick

11 October 1986 10	Borussia Mönchengladbach	5-0	Homburg	Bökelbergstadion, Mönchengladbach
15:30	Lienen 52'; Thiele 57', 70'; Rahn 64', 88'	Report		Attendance: 12,000; Referee: Wolfgang Mierswa

18 October 1986 11	Bayer Uerdingen	1-1	Borussia Mönchengladbach	Grotenburg-Stadion, Krefeld
15:30	Thommessen 49'	Report	Rahn 74'	Attendance: 26,000; Referee: Rainer Boos

1 November 1986 12	Borussia Mönchengladbach	4-0	Stuttgart	Bökelbergstadion, Mönchengladbach
18:00	Rahn 44'; Thiele 63'; Borowka 81'; Criens 90'	Report		Attendance: 24,000; Referee: Gerhard Theobald

8 November 1986 13	Schalke 04	1-2	Borussia Mönchengladbach	Parkstadion, Gelsenkirchen
15:30	Wegmann 58'	Report	Rahn 61'; Frontzeck 85'	Attendance: 27,500; Referee: Hans Scheuerer

15 November 1986 14	Borussia Mönchengladbach	2-2	Borussia Dortmund	Bökelbergstadion, Mönchengladbach
15:30	Rahn 38', 85'	Report	Dickel 12'; Storck 90'	Attendance: 22,000; Referee: Joachim Kautschor

22 November 1986 15	Fortuna Düsseldorf	1-1	Borussia Mönchengladbach	Rheinstadion, Düsseldorf
15:30	Weikl 38'	Report	Dreßen 82'	Attendance: 30,000; Referee: Hans-Peter Schäfer

29 November 1986 16	Borussia Mönchengladbach	3-1	Köln	Bökelbergstadion, Mönchengladbach
15:30	Bakalorz 12'; Hochstätter 22', 30'	Report	Lehnhoff 90'	Attendance: 31,000; Referee: Aron Schmidhuber

6 December 1986 17	Nürnberg	2-0	Borussia Mönchengladbach	Frankenstadion, Nuremberg
15:30	Andersen 50'; Lieberwirth 84'	Report		Attendance: 41,300; Referee: Anton Matheis

21 February 1987 18	Hamburg	3-1	Borussia Mönchengladbach	Volksparkstadion, Hamburg
15:30	Jusufi 44'; Schmöller 53', 57'	Report	Frontzeck 20'	Attendance: 28,500; Referee: Peter Gabor

28 February 1987 19	Borussia Mönchengladbach	0-1	Kaiserslautern	Bökelbergstadion, Mönchengladbach
15:30		Report	Hartmann 16'	Attendance: 13,500; Referee: Manfred Neuner

14 March 1987 20	Borussia Mönchengladbach	2-1	Blau-Weiß 90 Berlin	Bökelbergstadion, Mönchengladbach
15:30	Frontzeck 31' (pen.); Criens 71'	Report	Schüler 87'	Attendance: 12,000; Referee: Helmut Reinstädtler

21 March 1987 21	Werder Bremen	1-7	Borussia Mönchengladbach	Weserstadion, Bremen
15:30	Pezzey 65'	Report	Dreßen 40'; Rahn 48'; Hochstätter 50'; Criens 57', 74'; Bakalorz 66'; Krauss 82'	Attendance: 28,960; Referee: Karl-Heinz Tritschler

28 March 1987 22	Borussia Mönchengladbach	2-1	Bochum	Bökelbergstadion, Mönchengladbach
15:30	Criens 17'; Hochstätter 34'	Report	Knäbel 45'	Attendance: 12,000; Referee: Manfred Amerell

4 April 1987 23	Eintracht Frankfurt	4-0	Borussia Mönchengladbach	Frankfurt, Frankfurt
15:30	Turowski 53', 61'; Thiele 65' (o.g.); Mitchell 87'	Report		Attendance: 21,000; Referee: Werner Föckler

11 April 1987 24	Borussia Mönchengladbach	0-1	Bayern Munich	Bökelbergstadion, Mönchengladbach
15:30		Report	Hoeneß 35'	Attendance: 33,000; Referee: Gerd Zimmermann

15 April 1987 25	Bayer Leverkusen	0-2	Borussia Mönchengladbach	Ulrich-Haberland-Stadion, Leverkusen
20:00		Report	Herlovsen 32'; Thiele 55'	Attendance: 15,000; Referee: Siegfried Brehm

25 April 1987 26	Borussia Mönchengladbach	7-2	Waldhof Mannheim	Bökelbergstadion, Mönchengladbach
15:30	Rahn 3', 14', 43' (pen.), 83'; Criens 51', 87'; Borowka 86'	Report	Walter 3'; Trieb 64'	Attendance: 6,000; Referee: Anton Matheis

2 May 1987 27	Homburg	0-2	Borussia Mönchengladbach	Waldstadion, Homburg
15:30		Report	Rahn 23'; Winkhold 44'	Attendance: 13,000; Referee: Manfred Neuner

9 May 1987 28	Borussia Mönchengladbach	2-0	Bayer Uerdingen	Bökelbergstadion, Mönchengladbach
15:30	Hochstätter 39'; Thiele 58'	Report		Attendance: 12,000; Referee: Karl-Josef Assenmacher

15 May 1987 29	Stuttgart	2-4	Borussia Mönchengladbach	Neckarstadion, Stuttgart
20:00	Merkle 48', 77'	Report	Hochstätter 17'; Bruns 54'; Rahn 59', 85'	Attendance: 20,000; Referee: Heinz Werner

22 May 1987 30	Kaiserslautern	2-3	Borussia Dortmund	Fritz-Walter-Stadion, Kaiserslautern
20:00	Schupp 79'; Wolf 86'	Report	Dickel 51'; Mill 55'; Zorc 78'	Attendance: 33,076; Referee: Wilfried Heitmann

30 May 1987 31	Borussia Dortmund	0-2	Borussia Mönchengladbach	Westfalenstadion, Dortmund
15:30		Report	Hochstätter 14'; Rahn 32'	Attendance: 54,000; Referee: Werner Föckler

6 June 1987 32	Werder Bremen	5-0	Borussia Dortmund	Weserstadion, Bremen
15:30	Burgsmüller 7', 71'; Möhlmann 30'; Ordenewitz 75' (pen.); Schaaf 86'	Report		Attendance: 22,993; Referee: Karl-Heinz Tritschler

13 June 1987 33	Borussia Dortmund	3-2	Bochum	Westfalenstadion, Dortmund
15:30	Mill 11', 74'; Banach 76'	Report	Schulz 32'; Liefeld 59'	Attendance: 34,000; Referee: Wolf-Dieter Ahlenfelder

17 June 1987 34	Eintracht Frankfurt	0-4	Borussia Dortmund	Waldstadion, Frankfurt
15:30		Report	Dickel 60'; Anderbrügge 63'; Mill 77', 89'	Attendance: 20,000; Referee: Aron Schmidhuber

=== DFB-Pokal ===
30 August 1986 First round	Rot-Weiß Oberhausen	1-3	Borussia Dortmundd	Niederrheinstadion, Oberhausen
15:30	van Roon 75'	Report	Dickel 23', 90'; Zorc 34'	Attendance: 7,000; Referee: Hans-Joachim Osmers

26 October 1986 Second round	Borussia Mönchengladbach	6-1	Borussia Dortmund	Bökelbergstadion, Mönchengladbach
18:00	Bakalorz 8'; Thiele 22'; Rahn 29'; Borowka 31'; Brandts 86'	Report	Helmer 17'	Attendance: 25,000; Referee: Heinz Werner
