= 1986–87 Hamburger SV season =

Hamburger SV
1986–87 season
- Manager: Ernst Happel
- Stadium: Volksparkstadion
- Bundesliga: 2nd
- DFB-Pokal: Winners
- Top goalscorer: League: Thomas von Heesen (12); All: Thomas von Heesen (16)
- Average home league attendance: 24,234

The 1986–87 Hamburger SV season was the 40th season in the club's history and the 24th consecutive season playing in the Bundesliga.

On 20 June 1987, HSV defeated Stuttgarter Kickers 3–1 in the final of the DFB-Pokal. It was Hamburg's third time lifting the German Cup and as of 2021, it remains the last major honour that the club has won.

It was also the final season that Austrian Ernst Happel managed the club as he stepped down following the DFB-Pokal success to return to Austria and manager FC Swarovski Tirol. He would be replaced by legendary Croatian striker Josip Skoblar who would himself be sacked just two months into the following season.

== Competitions ==
=== Overview ===
Competition	First match	Last match	Starting round	Final position	Record							
Competition	First match	Last match	Starting round	Final position	Pld	W	D	L	GF	GA	GD	Win %
Bundesliga	16 August 1986	17 June 1987	Matchday 1	2nd	34	19	9	6	69	37	+32	55.88
DFB-Pokal	29 August 1986	20 June 1987	First round	Winners	6	6	0	0	16	2	+14	100.00
Total					40	25	9	6	85	39	+46	62.50

Source: World Football

=== Bundesliga ===
==== League table ====
Pos	Team	Pld	W	D	L	GF	GA	GD	Pts	Qualification or relegation
1	Bayern Munich (C)	34	20	13	1	67	31	+36	53	Qualification to European Cup first round
2	Hamburger SV	34	19	9	6	69	37	+32	47	Qualification to Cup Winners' Cup first round
3	Borussia Mönchengladbach	34	18	7	9	74	44	+30	43	Qualification to UEFA Cup first round (Note: As Hamburger SV qualified for the Cup Winners' Cup, their UEFA Cup spot was transferred to Leverkusen.)
4	Borussia Dortmund	34	15	10	9	70	50	+20	40	Qualification to UEFA Cup first round
5	Werder Bremen	34	17	6	11	65	54	+11	40	Qualification to UEFA Cup first round

Source: www.dfb.de
Rules for classification: 1) points; 2) goal difference; 3) number of goals scored.
(C) Champions

=== DFB Pokal ===
==== Results ====
Win	Draw	Loss

Date	Round	Opponent	Venue	Result	Scorers	Attendance	Referee
29 August 1986	First round	SG Union Solingen	Home	3–0	Okoński, Kaltz (pen), von Heesen	5,000	Zimmermann
24 October 1986	Second round	FC Augsburg	Away	1–2	Jakobs, Jusufi	20,000	Bodmer
19 November 1986	Round of 16	FC St. Pauli	Home	6–0	Jusufi, Schmöller (2), von Heesen (3)	58,000	Wiesel
7 March 1987	Quarter-final	Darmstadt 98	Away	0–1	Kastl	26,000	Weber
31 March 1987	Semi-final	Borussia Mönchengladbach	Home	1–0	Kastl	45,000	Schmidhuber
20 June 1987	Final	Stuttgarter Kickers	Neutral	3–1	Beiersdorfer, Kaltz, Schlotterbeck (own goal)	76,000	Gabor

== Statistics ==
=== Goalscorers ===
Rank	Pos	Nat	Name	Bundesliga	DFB-Pokal	Total
1	MF	(Germany)	Thomas von Heesen	12	4	16
2	FW	(Germany)	Manfred Kastl	10	2	12
3	MF	(Germany)	Sascha Jusufi	8	2	10
4	MF	(Poland)	Mirosław Okoński	8	1	9
5	DF	(Germany)	Manfred Kaltz	4	2	6
5	FW	(Germany)	Frank Schmöller	4	2	6
7	FW	(Germany)	Ralf Balzis	4	0	4
7	MF	(Germany)	Peter Lux	4	0	4
9	FW	(Germany)	Lothar Dittmer	3	0	3
9	MF	(Germany)	Heinz Gründel	3	0	3
9	MF	(Germany)	Tobias Homp	3	0	3
12	DF	(Germany)	Dietmar Beiersdorfer	1	1	2
12	DF	(Germany)	Ditmar Jakobs	1	1	2
12	MF	(Germany)	Thomas Kroth	2	0	2
12	DF	(Belgium)	Gerard Plessers	2	0	2
Own goals				0	1	1
Totals				69	16	85
