= 1987 DFB-Pokal final =

- Match programme cover
- Event: 1986–87 DFB-Pokal
Hamburger SV	Stuttgarter Kickers
3	1
- Date: 20 June 1987
- Venue: Olympiastadion, West Berlin
- Referee: Peter Gabor (West Berlin)
- Attendance: 76,000

The 1987 DFB-Pokal final decided the winner of the 1986–87 DFB-Pokal, the 44th season of Germany's premier knockout football cup competition. It was played on 20 June 1987 at the Olympiastadion in West Berlin. Hamburger SV won the match 3–1 against second division Stuttgarter Kickers to claim their third cup title, qualifying for the 1987–88 European Cup Winners' Cup and the 1987 DFB-Supercup.

== Route to the final ==
The DFB-Pokal began with 64 teams in a single-elimination knockout cup competition. There were a total of five rounds leading up to the final. Teams were drawn against each other, and the winner after 90 minutes would advance. If still tied, 30 minutes of extra time was played. If the score was still level, a replay would take place at the original away team's stadium. If still level after 90 minutes, 30 minutes of extra time was played. If the score was still level, a drawing of lots would decide who would advance to the next round.

Note: In all results below, the score of the finalist is given first (H: home; A: away).

Hamburger SV		Round	Stuttgarter Kickers
Opponent	Result	1986–87 DFB-Pokal	Opponent	Result
Union Solingen (H)	3–0	Round 1	Tennis Borussia Berlin (A)	5–0
FC Augsburg (A)	2–1	Round 2	Borussia Neunkirchen (A)	3–2
FC St. Pauli (H)	6–0	Round of 16	Hannover 96 (H)	2–0
Darmstadt 98 (A)	1–0	Quarter-finals	Eintracht Frankfurt (H)	3–1
Borussia Mönchengladbach (H)	1–0	Semi-finals	Fortuna Düsseldorf (H)	3–0

== Match ==
=== Details ===
20 June 1987
18:00 CEST

Hamburger SV	3–1	Stuttgarter Kickers
Beiersdorfer 15'; Kaltz 88'; Schlotterbeck 90' (o.g.)	Report	Kurtenbach 13'

Olympiastadion, West Berlin
Attendance: 76,000
Referee: Peter Gabor (West Berlin)

Hamburger SV	Stuttgarter Kickers

GK	1	(West Germany) Uli Stein
RB	2	(West Germany) Manfred Kaltz
CB	4	(West Germany) Ditmar Jakobs
CB	5	(West Germany) Dietmar Beiersdorfer	Booked
LB	3	(West Germany) Tobias Homp
CM	8	(West Germany) Sascha Jusufi		(substituted off) 68'
CM	11	(West Germany) Peter Lux
CM	7	(West Germany) Thomas Kroth
AM	6	(West Germany) Thomas von Heesen (c)
CF	9	(West Germany) Manfred Kastl
CF	10	(Poland) Mirosław Okoński
Substitutes:
GK	16	(West Germany) Uwe Hain
DF	12	(West Germany) Thomas Hinz
MF	13	(West Germany) Walter Laubinger
FW	14	(West Germany) Frank Schmöller		(substituted in) 68'
FW	15	(West Germany) Ralf Balzis
Manager:
(Austria) Ernst Happel

GK	1	(West Germany) Armin Jäger
SW	2	(West Germany) Ralf Forster
CB	4	(West Germany) Niels Schlotterbeck	Booked
CB	5	(West Germany) Dieter Finke (c)	Booked	(substituted off) 66'
RWB	6	(Ghana) Anthony Baffoe
LWB	3	(West Germany) Bernd Schindler
CM	11	(West Germany) Hans Hein
CM	7	(West Germany) Frank Elser
AM	10	(Poland) Kazimierz Kmiecik
CF	8	(West Germany) Dirk Kurtenbach
CF	9	(West Germany) Ralf Vollmer		(substituted off) 83'
Substitutes:
DF	13	(West Germany) Heribert Stadler		(substituted in) 66'
FW	14	(West Germany) Detlef Olaidotter		(substituted in) 83'
Manager:
(West Germany) Dieter Renner

Match rules

- 90 minutes.
- 30 minutes of extra time if necessary.
- Penalty shoot-out if scores still level.
- Maximum of two substitutions.
