= 1987 DFB-Supercup =

- Match programme cover
Bayern Munich	Hamburger SV
2	1
- Date: 28 July 1987
- Venue: Waldstadion, Frankfurt
- Referee: Dieter Pauly (Rheydt)
- Attendance: 22,000

The 1987 DFB-Supercup was the inaugural DFB-Supercup, an annual football match contested by the winners of the previous season's Bundesliga and DFB-Pokal competitions.

The match was played at the Waldstadion in Frankfurt, and contested by league champions Bayern Munich and cup winners Hamburger SV.

== Teams ==
Team	Qualification
Bayern Munich	1986–87 Bundesliga champions
Hamburger SV	1986–87 DFB-Pokal winners

== Match ==
=== Details ===
28 July 1987
20:00 CET

Bayern Munich	2–1	Hamburger SV
Wegmann 60', 87'	Report	Okoński 39'

Waldstadion, Frankfurt
Attendance: 22,000
Referee: Dieter Pauly (Rheydt)

Bayern Munich	Hamburger SV

GK	1	(West Germany) Raimond Aumann
SW	2	(East Germany) Norbert Nachtweih
CB	6	(West Germany) Helmut Winklhofer
CB	5	(West Germany) Norbert Eder
CB	4	(West Germany) Hans Pflügler
RM	3	(West Germany) Andreas Brehme	(substituted off) 46'
CM	10	(West Germany) Lothar Matthäus (c)
CM	7	(West Germany) Hans Dorfner
LM	11	(West Germany) Michael Rummenigge
CF	8	(West Germany) Jürgen Wegmann
CF	9	(West Germany) Roland Wohlfarth
Substitutes:
MF		(West Germany) Hansi Flick		(substituted on) 46'
Manager:
(West Germany) Jupp Heynckes

GK	1	(West Germany) Uli Stein	(red card) 87'
SW		(West Germany) Ditmar Jakobs
CB		(West Germany) Dietmar Beiersdorfer
CB		(West Germany) Carsten Kober		(substituted off) 87'
RWB		(West Germany) Manfred Kaltz (c)
LWB		(West Germany) Thomas Hinz	Booked	(substituted off) 90'
CM		(West Germany) Sascha Jusufi	Booked
CM		(West Germany) Thomas von Heesen	Booked
CM		(West Germany) Thomas Kroth	Booked
CF		(West Germany) Manfred Kastl
CF		(Poland) Mirosław Okoński
Substitutes:
GK		(West Germany) Richard Golz		(substituted on) 87'
FW		(West Germany) Frank Schmöller		(substituted on) 90'
Manager:
(Socialist Federal Republic of Yugoslavia) Josip Skoblar

== See also ==
- 1987–88 Bundesliga
- 1987–88 DFB-Pokal
