= 1991–92 VfB Stuttgart season =

VfB Stuttgart
1991–92 season
- Manager: Christoph Daum
- Stadium: Neckarstadion
- Bundesliga: 1st (champions)
- DFB-Pokal: Quarter-finals
- UEFA Cup: Second round
- Top goalscorer: League: Fritz Walter (22); All: Fritz Walter (31)

The 1991–92 VfB Stuttgart season was the 71st season in the club's history and the 15th season since promotion from 2. Bundesliga Süd in 1977. Stuttgart won the league, the second Bundesliga title for the club and the fourth German championship.

The club also participated in the DFB-Pokal and UEFA Cup, where it reached quarter-finals and second round respectively.

== Competitions ==
=== Overview ===
Competition	First match	Last match	Starting round	Final position	Record							
Competition	First match	Last match	Starting round	Final position	Pld	W	D	L	GF	GA	GD	Win %
Bundesliga	2 August 1991	16 May 1992	Matchday 1	Winners	38	21	10	7	62	32	+30	55.26
DFB-Pokal	16 August 1991	30 October 1991	Second round	Quarter-finals	4	3	0	1	14	4	+10	75.00
UEFA Cup	18 September 1991	6 November 1991	First round	Second round	4	1	2	1	8	6	+2	25.00
Total					46	25	12	9	84	42	+42	54.35

Source: Competitions

=== Bundesliga ===
2 August 1991 1	MSV Duisburg	1–0	VfB Stuttgart	Duisburg
19:30	Tönnies 29' (pen.)	Report		Stadium: Wedaustadion; Attendance: 22,600; Referee: Wolf-Günter Wiesel

10 August 1991 2	VfB Stuttgart	1–0	Karlsruher SC	Stuttgart
15:30	Walter 58'	Report		Stadium: Neckarstadion; Attendance: 30,000; Referee: Günther Habermann

14 August 1991 3	Werder Bremen	1–1	VfB Stuttgart	Bremen
20:00	Bode 49'	Report	Buchwald 54'	Stadium: Weser-Stadion; Attendance: 18,500; Referee: Markus Merk

21 August 1991 4	VfB Stuttgart	3–0	Hansa Rostock	Stuttgart
21:00	Sammer 26'; Walter 59'; Gaudino 85'	Report		Stadium: Neckarstadion; Attendance: 51,000; Referee: Manfred Führer

24 August 1991 5	Fortuna Düsseldorf	0–3	VfB Stuttgart	Düsseldorf
15:30		Report	Sammer 20'; Frontzeck 68'; Gaudino 82'	Stadium: Rheinstadion; Attendance: 9,000; Referee: Wieland Ziller

27 August 1991 6	VfB Stuttgart	1–0	Schalke 04	Stuttgart
20:00	Sammer 44'	Report		Stadium: Neckarstadion; Attendance: 45,000; Referee: Lutz Michael Fröhlich

31 August 1991 7	Dynamo Dresden	1–0	VfB Stuttgart	Dresden
15:30	Zander 23'	Report		Stadium: Rudolf-Harbig-Stadion; Attendance: 17,000; Referee: Hans-Joachim Osmers

7 September 1991 8	VfB Stuttgart	4–1	VfL Bochum	Stuttgart
15:30	Walter 9' (pen.), 28', 33'; Schäfer 80'	Report	Bonan 13'	Stadium: Neckarstadion; Attendance: 17,500; Referee: Karl-Heinz Gläser

14 September 1991 9	1. FC Köln	1–1	VfB Stuttgart	Cologne
15:30	Banach 39'	Report	Walter 24'	Stadium: Müngersdorfer Stadion; Attendance: 19,000; Referee: Werner Föckler

21 September 1991 10	VfB Stuttgart	4–1	1. FC Kaiserslautern	Stuttgart
15:30	Dubajić 32'; Kastl 43'; Buchwald 59'; Gaudino 77'	Report	Funkel 15'	Stadium: Neckarstadion; Attendance: 35,000; Referee: Georg Dardenne

28 September 1991 11	Hamburger SV	1–1	VfB Stuttgart	Hamburg
15:30	Spörl 4'	Report	Frontzeck 37'	Stadium: Volksparkstadion; Attendance: 26,000; Referee: Hans-Jürgen Weber

5 October 1991 12	VfB Stuttgart	1–2	Eintracht Frankfurt	Stuttgart
15:30	Gaudino 45'	Report	Andersen 60'; Yeboah 80'	Stadium: Neckarstadion; Attendance: 48,500; Referee: Hellmut Krug

11 October 1991 13	1. FC Nürnberg	4–3	VfB Stuttgart	Nürnberg
20:00	Eckstein 3', 44'; Oechler 54'; Wück 84'	Report	Walter 17'; Buchwald 65'; Frontzeck 69'	Stadium: Frankenstadion; Attendance: 46,000; Referee: Hartmut Strampe

19 October 1991 14	VfB Stuttgart	3–2	Bayern Munich	Stuttgart
15:30	Gaudino 4'; Walter 8'; Dubajić 72'	Report	Berthold 23'; Effenberg 78'	Stadium: Neckarstadion; Attendance: 62,300; Referee: Michael Prengel

26 October 1991 15	Borussia Dortmund	0–0	VfB Stuttgart	Dortmund
15:30		Report		Stadium: Westfalenstadion; Attendance: 45,371; Referee: Alfons Berg

2 November 1991 16	VfB Stuttgart	3–1	Stuttgarter Kickers	Stuttgart
15:30	Sammer 10'; Walter 62'; Buck 90'	Report	Novodomsky 40'	Stadium: Neckarstadion; Attendance: 40,200; Referee: Karl-Josef Assenmacher

9 November 1991 17	VfB Stuttgart	0–1	Borussia Mönchengladbach	Stuttgart
15:30		Report	Fach 3'	Stadium: Neckarstadion; Attendance: 19,000; Referee: Hans-Peter Dellwing

15 November 1991 18	SG Wattenscheid 09	1–3	VfB Stuttgart	Bochum-Wattenscheid
20:00	Fink 58'	Report	Buchwald 9'; Langbein 27' (o.g.); Sverrisson 35'	Stadium: Lohrheidestadion; Attendance: 3,200; Referee: Günther Habermann

23 November 1991 19	VfB Stuttgart	2–0	Bayer Leverkusen	Stuttgart
15:30	Walter 75', 87'	Report		Stadium: Neckarstadion; Attendance: 21,000; Referee: Aron Schmidhuber

30 November 1991 20	VfB Stuttgart	2–0	MSV Duisburg	Stuttgart
15:30	Sverrisson 8'; Gaudino 75'	Report		Stadium: Neckarstadion; Attendance: 17,000; Referee: Bernd Heynemann

7 December 1991 21	Karlsruher SC	0–0	VfB Stuttgart	Karlsruhe
20:00		Report		Stadium: Wildparkstadion; Attendance: 18,000; Referee: Manfred Führer

14 December 1991 22	VfB Stuttgart	1–1	Werder Bremen	Stuttgart
15:30	Frontzeck 77'	Report	Allofs 65'	Stadium: Neckarstadion; Attendance: 18,000; Referee: Jürgen Aust

8 February 1992 23	Hansa Rostock	2–0	VfB Stuttgart	Rostock
15:30	Schlotterbeck 28'; Spies 50'	Report		Stadium: Ostseestadion; Attendance: 10,000; Referee: Markus Merk

15 February 1992 24	VfB Stuttgart	3–1	Fortuna Düsseldorf	Stuttgart
15:30	Kögl 35'; Walter 49', 80'	Report	Allofs 73'	Stadium: Neckarstadion; Attendance: 15,000; Referee: Hartmut Strampe

22 February 1992 25	Schalke 04	0–1	VfB Stuttgart	Gelsenkirchen
15:30		Report	Sammer 72'	Stadium: Parkstadion; Attendance: 40,300; Referee: Hans-Jürgen Kasper

29 February 1992 26	VfB Stuttgart	1–1	Dynamo Dresden	Stuttgart
15:30	Müller 19' (o.g.)	Report	Zander 51'	Stadium: Neckarstadion; Attendance: 22,000; Referee: Lothar Löwe

7 March 1992 27	VfL Bochum	0–2	VfB Stuttgart	Bochum
15:30		Report	Walter 82'; Sammer 89'	Stadium: Ruhrstadion; Attendance: 13,000; Referee: Werner Föckler

14 March 1992 28	VfB Stuttgart	1–0	1. FC Köln	Stuttgart
15:30	Sverrisson 83'	Report		Stadium: Neckarstadion; Attendance: 26,500; Referee: Wolfgang Mierswa

21 March 1992 29	1. FC Kaiserslautern	0–0	VfB Stuttgart	Kaiserslautern
15:30		Report		Stadium: Fritz-Walter-Stadion; Attendance: 38,500; Referee: Karl-Josef Assenmacher

28 March 1992 30	VfB Stuttgart	3–2	Hamburger SV	Stuttgart
15:30	Walter 14' (pen.), 58'; Gaudino 81'	Report	Eck 19', 85'	Stadium: Neckarstadion; Attendance: 25,000; Referee: Klaus-Dieter Stenzel

4 April 1992 31	Eintracht Frankfurt	1–1	VfB Stuttgart	Frankfurt
15:30	Sippel 58'	Report	Kastl 45'	Stadium: Waldstadion; Attendance: 47,000; Referee: Hans-Peter Dellwing

11 April 1992 32	VfB Stuttgart	2–0	1. FC Nürnberg	Stuttgart
15:30	Sammer 22', 35'	Report		Stadium: Neckarstadion; Attendance: 44,000; Referee: Hellmut Krug

18 April 1992 33	Bayern Munich	1–0	VfB Stuttgart	Munich
15:30	Effenberg 44'	Report		Stadium: Olympiastadion; Attendance: 65,000; Referee: Manfred Führer

25 April 1992 34	VfB Stuttgart	4–2	Borussia Dortmund	Stuttgart
15:30	Helmer 32' (o.g.); Walter 45', 71'; Gaudino 90'	Report	Povlsen 14'; Helmer 84'	Stadium: Neckarstadion; Attendance: 68,000; Referee: Manfred Harder

2 May 1992 35	Stuttgarter Kickers	1–3	VfB Stuttgart	Stuttgart
15:30	Moutas 49'	Report	Walter 77', 90'; Frontzeck 82'	Stadium: Neckarstadion; Attendance: 36,500; Referee: Aron Schmidhuber

5 May 1992 36	Borussia Mönchengladbach	0–1	VfB Stuttgart	Mönchengladbach
20:00		Report	Walter 11'	Stadium: Bökelbergstadion; Attendance: 22,000; Referee: Karl-Heinz Gläser

9 May 1992 37	VfB Stuttgart	1–1	SG Wattenscheid 09	Stuttgart
15:30	Sammer 36'	Report	Bach 40'	Stadium: Neckarstadion; Attendance: 33,500; Referee: Alfons Berg

16 May 1992 38	Bayer Leverkusen	1–2	VfB Stuttgart	Leverkusen
15:30	Kree 20' (pen.)	Report	Walter 43' (pen.); Buchwald 86'	Stadium: Ulrich-Haberland-Stadion; Attendance: 25,500; Referee: Hans-Peter Dellwing

=== DFB Pokal ===
16 August 1991 Second round	Werder Bremen II	1–5	VfB Stuttgart	Bremen
18:30	Bester 28'	Report	Walter 4', 75'; Buchwald 44'; Kastl 50'; Sammer 63'	Stadium: Weserstadion Platz 11; Attendance: 1,200; Referee: Michael Malbranc

4 September 1991 Third round	VfL Wolfsburg	1–3	VfB Stuttgart	Wolfsburg
17:30	Reich 90'	Report	Walter 7'; Kastl 64'; Gaudino 82'	Stadium: VfL-Stadion am Elsterweg; Attendance: 6,700; Referee: Bodo Brandt-Chollé

25 September 1991 Round of 16	Freiburger FC	1–6	VfB Stuttgart	Freiburg
17:00	Wernet 14'	Report	Walter 5', 39', 41', 74'; Kastl 43', 80'	Stadium: Schönbergstadion; Attendance: 12,500; Referee: Thomas Leimert

30 October 1991 Quarter-finals	Bayer Leverkusen	1–0 (a.e.t.)	VfB Stuttgart	Leverkusen
20:00	Buchwald 110' (o.g.)	Report		Stadium: Ulrich-Haberland-Stadion; Attendance: 10,000; Referee: Edgar Steinborn

=== UEFA Cup ===
==== First round ====
18 September 1991 First leg	VfB Stuttgart (Germany)	4–1	(Hungary) Pécsi MFC	Stuttgart
	Sammer 20'; Walter 32', 39'; Buchwald 35'	Report	Balog 89'	Stadium: Neckarstadion

2 October 1991 Second leg	Pécsi MFC (Hungary)	2–2 (6–3 agg.)	(Germany) VfB Stuttgart	Pécs
	Magyar 18'; Mörtel 84'	Report	Strehmel 54'; Mayer 75'	Stadium: Stadion PMFC

==== Second round ====
22 October 1991 First leg	Osasuna (Spain)	0–0	(Germany) VfB Stuttgart	Pamplona
		Report		Stadium: El Sadar Stadium

6 November 1991 Second leg	VfB Stuttgart (Germany)	2–3 (2–3 agg.)	(Spain) Osasuna	Stuttgart
	Buchwald 80'; Sverrisson 89'	Report	Urban 8', 47'; Merino 18'	Stadium: Neckarstadion

== Statistics ==
=== Squad statistics ===
No.	Pos	Nat	Player	Total		Bundesliga		DFB-Pokal		UEFA Cup	
No.	Pos	Nat	Player	Apps	Goals	Apps	Goals	Apps	Goals	Apps	Goals
1	GK	(Germany) GER	Eike Immel	46	0	38	0	4	0	4	0
6	DF	(Germany) GER	Guido Buchwald	44	7	37	5	4	1	3	1
4	DF	(Socialist Federal Republic of Yugoslavia) YUG	Slobodan Dubajić	46	2	38	2	4	0	4	0
3	DF	(Germany) GER	Michael Frontzeck	46	5	38	5	4	0	4	0
	DF	(Germany) GER	Günther Schäfer	36	1	28	1	4	0	4	0
	DF	(Germany) GER	Nils Schmäler	7	0	6	0	0	0	1	0
	DF	(Germany) GER	Thomas Schneider	6	0	2	0	4	0	0	0
	DF	(Germany) GER	Uwe Schneider	36	0	33	0	0	0	3	0
	DF	(Germany) GER	Alexander Strehmel	31	1	25	0	4	0	2	1
	MF	(Germany) GER	Andreas Buck	36	1	30	1	3	0	3	0
	MF	(Germany) GER	Maurizio Gaudino	46	9	38	8	4	1	4	0
	MF	(Germany) GER	Marc Kienle	13	0	10	0	2	0	1	0
	MF	(Germany) GER	Jürgen Kramny	14	0	10	0	3	0	1	0
	MF	(Germany) GER	Michael Mayer	2	1	1	0	0	0	1	1
8	MF	(Germany) GER	Matthias Sammer	39	12	33	9	3	1	3	2
	FW	(Germany) GER	Manfred Kastl	32	6	24	2	4	4	4	0
11	FW	(Germany) GER	Ludwig Kögl	16	1	16	1	0	0	0	0
	FW	(Iceland) ISL	Eyjólfur Sverrisson	34	4	31	3	1	0	2	1
9	FW	(Germany) GER	Fritz Walter	45	31	38	22	4	7	3	2
