= Colin Bell (footballer, born 1961) =

English football manager (born 1961)

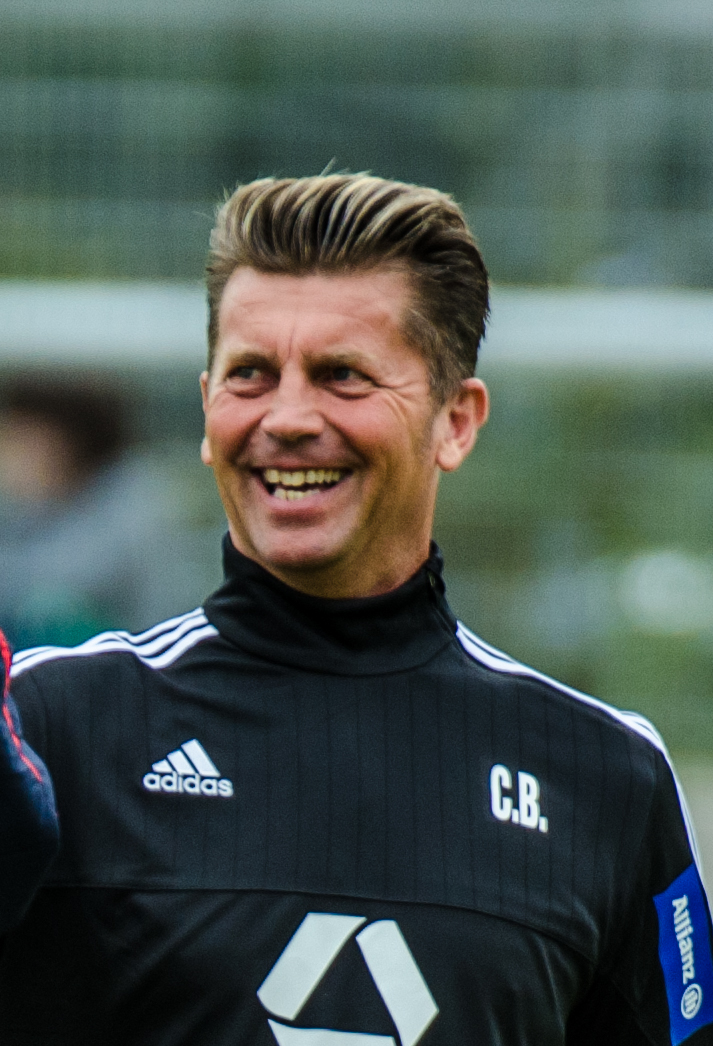
- Bell in 2015

Personal information
- Full name: Colin Bell
- Date of birth: 5 August 1961 (age 65)
- Place of birth: Leicester, England
- Position: Defender

Team information
- Current team: Myanmar women (manager)

Senior career*
Years	Team	Apps	(Gls)
1980–1982	Leicester City	0	(0)
1982–1987	VfL Hamm		
1987–1989	Mainz 05	40	(6)

Managerial career
- 1989–1996: TuS Koblenz
- 1999–2000: Dynamo Dresden
- 2000: VfL Hamm
- 2000–2001: Waldhof Mannheim
- 2001–2005: Mainz 05 II
- 2005: Preußen Münster
- 2006–2011: TuS Koblenz (youth coach)
- 2008–2010: TuS Koblenz (assistant)
- 2011–2013: SC 07 Bad Neuenahr
- 2013–2015: 1. FFC Frankfurt
- 2015–2016: Avaldsnes IL
- 2016–2017: SC Sand
- 2017–2019: Republic of Ireland women
- 2019: Huddersfield Town (assistant)
- 2019–2024: South Korea women
- 2024: Aberdeen F.C. Women
- 2024–2026: China U-20 women
- 2026–: Myanmar women
- * Club domestic league appearances and goals

Colin Bell (born 5 August 1961) is an English football manager and former player, who is the current manager of Myanmar women. He previously coached the South Korea women's national team when he led the team to the 2022 Women's Asian Cup where his team finished runner ups to China. He earned reputation when he won the 2014–15 UEFA Women's Champions League with 1. FFC Frankfurt.

Colin is originally from Leicestershire and has 2 brothers and 3 sisters.

== Playing career ==
Bell began his career at Leicester City, but did not break into the first team and left for Germany aged 20. Bell played for VfL Hamm and 1. FSV Mainz 05, featuring in the 2. Bundesliga for the latter.

== Coaching career ==
Bell retired to take up coaching in 1989. He managed TuS Koblenz for seven years, before joining the coaching staff of 1. FC Köln in 1996. In 1999, he took on his most high-profile role to date, managing Dynamo Dresden, but was not successful – the team failed to qualify for the restructured Regionalliga, and dropped to the Oberliga (level four) for the first time. He was sacked before the end of the season. After spells managing SV Waldhof Mannheim, 1. FSV Mainz 05's reserve team, and SC Preußen Münster, he worked at TuS Koblenz as assistant manager and youth coach.

In 2011, he signed for SC 07 Bad Neuenahr in Germany's Women's Bundesliga. Two seasons later, Bell became the manager of 1. FFC Frankfurt. The team won the Frauen DFB Pokal in 2014 and the UEFA Women's Champions League in 2015.

In December 2015, he left 1. FFC Frankfurt to coach Avaldsnes IL.

In July 2016, he returned to Germany to coach Sand.

On 8 February 2017, Colin Bell was appointed the Senior International Manager of the Republic of Ireland, replacing Sue Ronan. He took up his new position from 13 February 2017.

On 29 June 2019, he was appointed as the Assistant Head Coach at EFL Championship club Huddersfield Town.

On 18 October 2019, he was appointed as the manager of the South Korea women's national team, with a contract to run up to and including the 2022 Women's Asian Cup. He became the first ever manager to guide South Korea to the final of a Women's Asian Cup, guiding South Korea to the final of the 2022 edition, where South Korea finished runners-up after losing to China.

On 8 October 2024, Bell was appointed as the manager of the China women's national under-20 football team.

On 13 August 2026, Bell was announced as manager of Myanmar women.

== Honours ==
1. FFC Frankfurt

- UEFA Women's Champions League: 2014–15
- DFB-Pokal Frauen: 2013–14
