= Colin Marshall (footballer, born 1969) =

Scottish footballer

Personal information
- Date of birth: 1 November 1969 (age 57)
- Place of birth: Glasgow, Scotland
- Position: Defender

Youth career
- Barnsley

Senior career*
Years	Team	Apps	(Gls)
1988–1992	Barnsley	4	(0)
1991	→ Wrexham (loan)	3	(0)
1992	→ Scarborough (loan)	4	(1)
1992–1995	VfB Wissen	93	(15)
1996–1997	TuS Koblenz	2	(1)
1999–2001	VfL Hamm/Sieg	16	(3)
- * Club domestic league appearances and goals

Colin Marshall (born 1 November 1969) is a Scottish former professional footballer. He made appearances in the football league for Barnsley, and also whilst on loan at Wrexham and Scarborough.
