= Matthias Sammer =

German association football player and manager

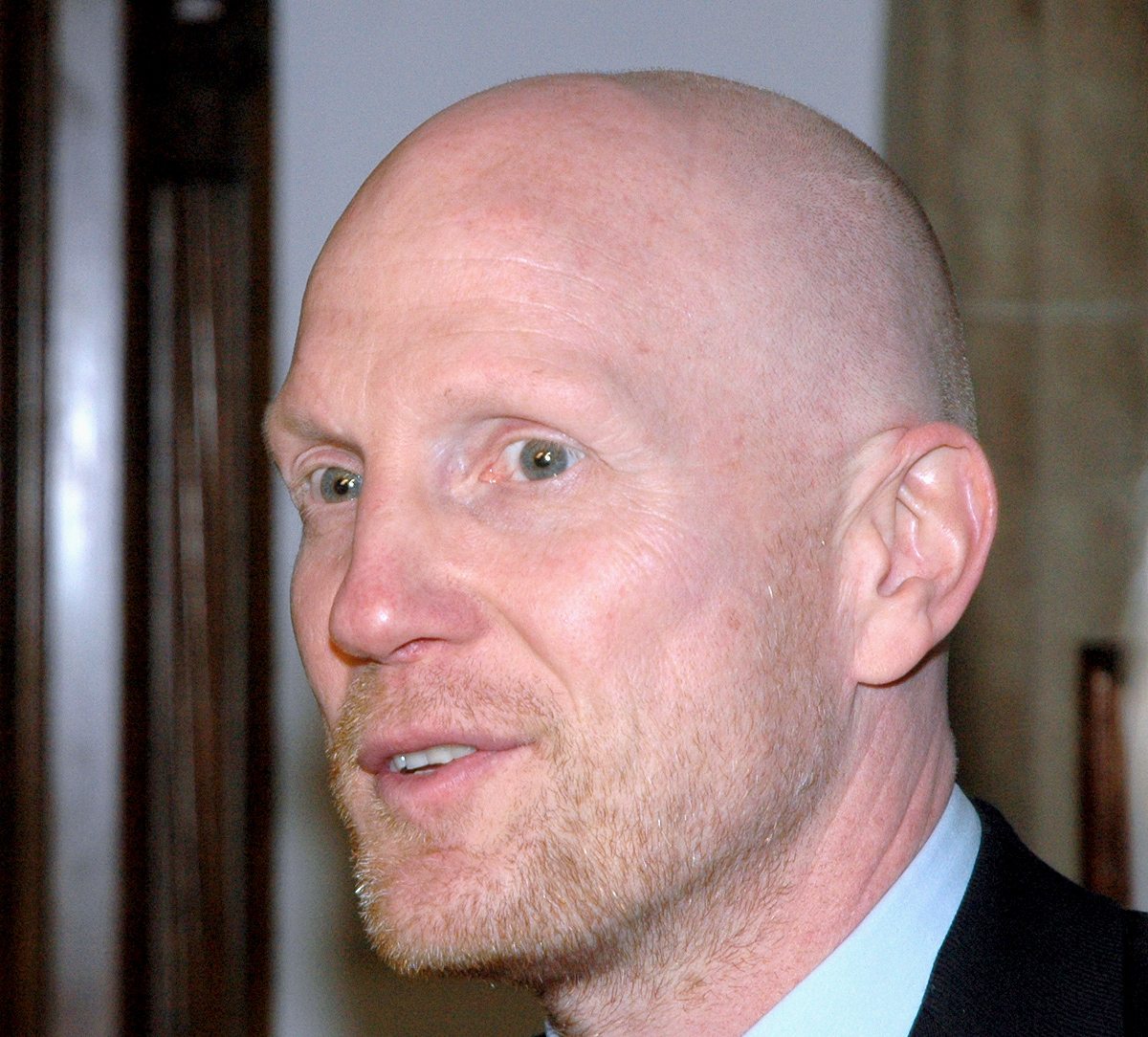
- Sammer in 2013

Personal information
- Birth name: Matthias Sammer
- Date of birth: 5 September 1967 (age 59)
- Place of birth: Dresden, East Germany
- Height: 1.81 m (5 ft 11 in)
- Positions: Defensive midfielder; sweeper

Team information
- Current team: Borussia Dortmund (external advisor)

Youth career
- 1976–1985: Dynamo Dresden

Senior career*
Years	Team	Apps	(Gls)
1985–1990	Dynamo Dresden	102	(39)
1990–1992	VfB Stuttgart	63	(20)
1992–1993	Inter Milan	11	(4)
1993–1998	Borussia Dortmund	115	(21)
Total		291	(84)

International career
1982–1983	East Germany U16 (de)	8	(7)
1984–1986	East Germany U18 (de)	22	(16)
1986	East Germany U19 (de)	3	(1)
1987	East Germany U20 (de)	6	(7)
1987–1988	East Germany U21	2	(0)
1988	East Germany Olympic	3	(0)
1986–1990	East Germany	23	(6)
1990–1997	Germany	51	(8)

Managerial career
- 2000: Borussia Dortmund (assistant)
- 2000–2004: Borussia Dortmund
- 2004–2005: VfB Stuttgart
- 2006–2012: Germany (technical director)
- 2012–2016: Bayern Munich (sporting director)
Medal record
Men's Football
Representing Germany
UEFA European Championship
Winner	1996 England
Runner-up	1992 Sweden
- * Club domestic league appearances and goals

Matthias Sammer (German pronunciation: [maˈtiːas ˈzamɐ]; born 5 September 1967) is a German football official and former player and coach. He played as a defensive midfielder and later in his career as a sweeper.

With Borussia Dortmund as a player, Sammer won the Bundesliga and DFB-Supercup in 1995, the Bundesliga, DFB-Supercup, and European Footballer of the Year in 1996, and the UEFA Champions League and Intercontinental Cup in 1997. Germany won the UEFA Euro 1996 with Sammer as a player, where he was named the tournament's best player, and was subsequently awarded the Ballon d'Or later that year. Sammer retired with 74 total caps, 23 for East Germany and 51 for the unified side. Known for his exceptional defensive skills, including his ability to read the game, make interceptions, and tackle effectively, Sammer is regarded as one of the greatest defenders of all time.

With Sammer as a manager, Borussia Dortmund won the Bundesliga in 2002.

== Club career ==
=== Dynamo Dresden ===
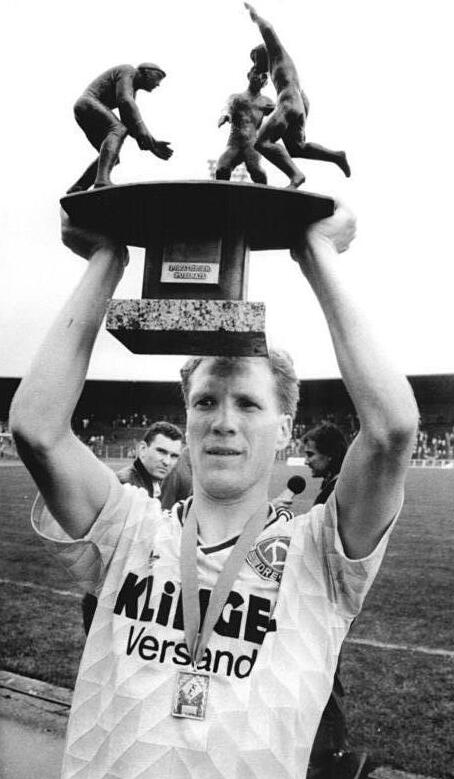
Sammer with Dresden in 1990, holding the FDGB-Pokal trophy

Sammer started his career at Dynamo Dresden when he joined the club's youth team as a nine-year-old in 1976. He made his debut for the senior team under the management of his father, Klaus Sammer, in the 1985–86 season. Playing as a striker, he scored eight goals in his first season as Dynamo finished fifth in the DDR-Oberliga. After being moved to the left wing the following season by new manager Eduard Geyer, he eventually found his place in central midfield during the 1987–88 season.

In the 1988–89 season, Sammer was part of the Dynamo Dresden team which won the East German championship. The same season the club also reached the semi-final of the UEFA Cup where they were knocked out by West German club VfB Stuttgart. The following year Dynamo won the league and cup double, defending the DDR-Oberliga title and also winning the 1990 FDGB-Pokal.

Sammer was formally an officer of the Volkspolizei, as a player of Dynamo Dresden. He enrolled into the Felix Dzerzhinsky Guards Regiment as a 19-year-old. Many players of Dynamo Dresden were assigned to the regiment for their military service. Sammer then served as a non-commissioned officer in the Guards Regiment for three years from 1987, holding the rank of sergeant in the Stasi. The President of SV Dynamo was the head of the Stasi Erich Mielke. Sammer has explained that he would not have been able to continue to play football for Dynamo Dresden if he had refused to serve with the Guards Regiment and that he never saw any weapon or took part in any military exercise. He has described his employment with the Guard Regiment as an alibi to play football to Dynamo Dresden.

=== VfB Stuttgart ===
In the summer of 1990, Sammer joined VfB Stuttgart of the Bundesliga. Sammer scored 11 times in his debut season as Stuttgart finished sixth in the Bundesliga. The following year Sammer scored nine goals, helping Stuttgart to become the first champions of the reunified Germany.

=== Inter Milan ===
After two seasons at Stuttgart, Sammer joined Italian club Inter Milan for the 1992–93 Serie A season. Though he was a success on the pitch, scoring four times in 11 appearances, including a goal against Juventus in the Derby d'Italia, Sammer failed to adapt to the Italian lifestyle and returned to Germany in January 1993.

=== Borussia Dortmund ===
In the winter break of the 1992–93 season, Sammer signed for Borussia Dortmund. He made 17 Bundesliga appearances in the second half of the season, scoring ten times.

The following season, Sammer was moved from midfield into the libero position by Dortmund coach Ottmar Hitzfeld. This move proved to be successful as Dortmund won back-to-back Bundesliga titles in 1994–95 and 1995–96, followed by the 1996–97 UEFA Champions League, with Sammer lifting the European Cup as captain after beating Juventus 3–1 in the final at Munich's Olympiastadion.

Soon after winning the Champions League, Sammer's career was cut short by injury. He made only three further Bundesliga appearances for Dortmund before suffering a serious knee injury which he failed to recover from and retired in 1998.

In addition to the two Bundesliga titles and one Champions League, Sammer also led Dortmund to two DFB-Supercups, in 1995 and 1996. Sammer himself was named Footballer of the Year (Germany) in both 1995 and 1996 and was named European Footballer of the Year in 1996, making him the first defender to win the Ballon d'Or since Franz Beckenbauer in 1976.

== International career ==
=== East Germany ===
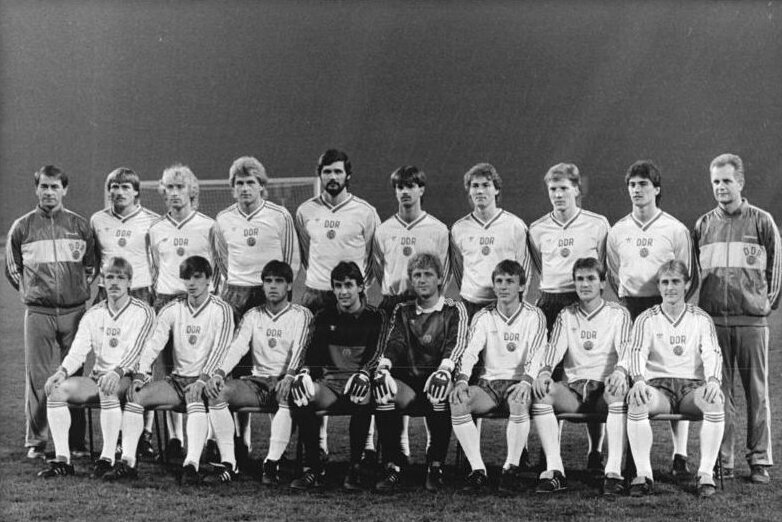
Sammer (back row, third from right) in 1986, with the East German football team

Sammer represented the GDR at every age group, from 1982 to 1990. He was part of the East German squads which won the 1986 UEFA European Under-18 Football Championship and finished third at the 1987 FIFA World Youth Championship.

In November 1986, he made his debut for the full East Germany national football team in a UEFA Euro 1988 qualifier against France at Zentralstadion in Leipzig.

On 12 September 1990, Sammer captained East Germany in its final match. He scored both goals as the GDR beat Belgium 2–0 in Brussels.

=== Germany ===
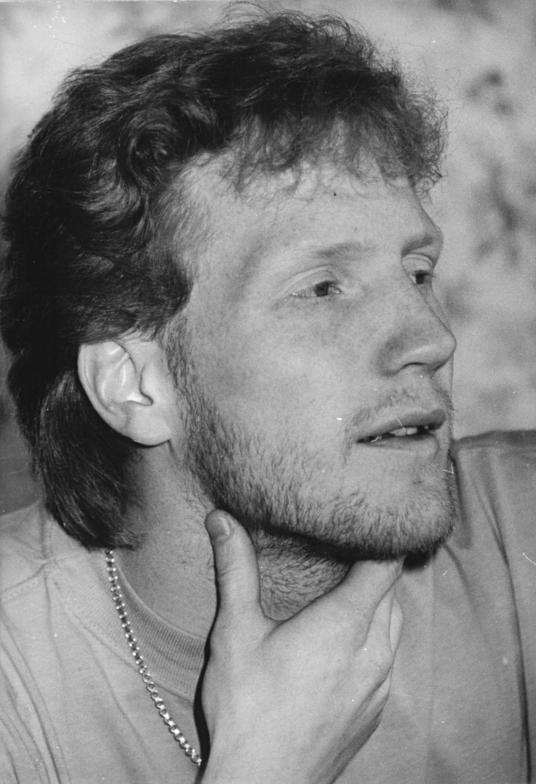
Sammer in 1990

On 19 December 1990, Sammer debuted for the newly formed unified Germany national football team, which was mostly made up of the West Germany team that had won the 1990 FIFA World Cup. The match was played at his home stadium in Stuttgart and Germany ran out 4–0 winners against Switzerland.

Sammer was a member of the German squad for UEFA Euro 1992, where the team was beaten in the final by Denmark. He was also selected for the 1994 FIFA World Cup, as Germany was surprisingly knocked out by the underdog Bulgaria at the quarter-final stage.

In UEFA Euro 1996, Sammer played in the libero role he had been converted to at Borussia Dortmund. He scored the opening goal in Germany's second group match against Russia and the winning goal against Croatia in the quarter-final. After Germany defeated the Czech Republic in the final, Sammer was named Player of the Tournament.

On 7 June 1997, Sammer played his final match for Germany in a 1998 FIFA World Cup qualifier against Ukraine in Kyiv. He did not take part at the 1998 FIFA World Cup due to injury.

== Style of play ==
Sammer usually played as a sweeper during the height of his career, in particular in later years, although he was also capable of playing in several midfield and offensive roles; indeed, he was often deployed further up the pitch earlier in his career, including in a holding role, as an attacking midfielder, as a central midfielder, as a left winger, as a deep-lying playmaker, or even as a striker on occasion, courtesy of his technique, stamina, passing ability, and vision. Although he was not the most physically gifted defender, due to his slender frame, he was regarded as a world class player in his position, in particular due to his intelligence and positional sense, while he was also able to improve his tackling ability as his career progressed. Despite his more defensive playing role, he was also a talented and energetic player, who was known for his eye for goal, athleticism, elegance, finesse, and offensive capabilities, and had a penchant for undertaking individual forward runs with the ball towards the opposing penalty area. Beyond his skills as a footballer, he was also known as an influential player and a commanding presence on the pitch, who stood out for his charismatic leadership qualities, determination, bravery, and composure under pressure. Despite his ability and reputation as one of the greatest sweepers of all time, however, he was also known to be prone to injuries, which ultimately forced him to retire from professional football at the age of 31. (Note: See)

== Coaching and management career ==
=== Borussia Dortmund ===
After retirement, Sammer first served as an assistant to Udo Lattek, and later became head coach of Borussia Dortmund on 1 July 2000. Sammer led Borussia Dortmund to another Bundesliga title in 2002. His team reached the 2001–02 UEFA Cup final the same year but lost 2–3 against Feyenoord. Sammer was sacked at the end of the 2003–04 season after Dortmund finished in sixth place.

=== VfB Stuttgart ===
Sammer returned to VfB Stuttgart as head coach for the 2004–05 season. Despite finishing one point off a Champions League qualifying position, Sammer left the club on 3 June 2005.

=== German Football Association ===
On 1 April 2006, he was appointed technical director of German Football Association (DFB), on a five-year contract. The position was new in the DFB at the time and had been initiated by national coach Jürgen Klinsmann, who undertook major structural reforms in the DFB during his short time of two years as a coach, with an impact lasting much longer than his actual term. The position included responsibility for the national youth teams, focusing on young talents between the ages of eleven and eighteen, as well as incorporating the latest developments in sports science into the DFB's training theories. Sammer was also expected to work on a tactical system for all of Germany's national sides in close co-operation with national coach Joachim Löw. He is credited of having led the declining quality of German football from its worst era at the beginning of the 2000s to new success through several talented players developed in the restructured youth system.

=== Bayern Munich ===
On 2 July 2012, he took over as sporting director of Bayern Munich and replaced Christian Nerlinger, who had been released following Bayern's treble losses in Bundesliga, German Cup and Champions League and because of his strained relationship with the club. As Sporting Director, Sammer was a member of the management board responsible for the professional playing staff of the club.

In his first season, Sammer orchestrated FC Bayern's turnaround to the first treble in club history by claiming the 2012–13 Bundesliga, the 2012–13 UEFA Champions League and the 2012–13 DFB-Pokal in record-setting fashion. In the next years three consecutive Bundesliga championships and two cup wins followed.

In spring 2016, he had a "minute circulatory disorder in the brain" and had to take a break from his work. During his recovery, he gained a new perspective on his work and family life and asked FC Bayern to release him from his position as sporting director which they granted on July 10, 2016. Afterwards, Bayern Munich continued working without any sporting director for a year before they presented Hasan Salihamidžić as his replacement.

Following this he effectively retired, initially working as a pundit for Eurosport for a while but ruling out to continue this in the future. In 2018, he started to work part-time as an adviser for Borussia Dortmund, meeting with the club for talks every two weeks, and is regularly seen sitting next to Dortmund's management during matches.

== Personal life ==
Sammer is married and has three children, Sarah, Marvin, and Leon. He lives in Munich, Germany. He is the son of Klaus Sammer, a former player and manager of Dynamo Dresden.

== Career statistics ==
=== Club ===
Appearances and goals by club, season and competition
Club	Season	League			National cup (Note: Includes FDGB-Pokal, DFB-Pokal, Coppa Italia)		League cup (Note: Includes DFB Ligapokal)		Europe		Other		Total	
Club	Season	Division	Apps	Goals	Apps	Goals	Apps	Goals	Apps	Goals	Apps	Goals	Apps	Goals
Dynamo Dresden	1985–86	DDR-Oberliga	18	8	4	6	–		6 (Note: Appearances in European Cup Winners' Cup)	2	–		28	16
Dynamo Dresden	1986–87	DDR-Oberliga	20	7	3	2	–		–		–		23	9
Dynamo Dresden	1987–88	DDR-Oberliga	19	8	3	1	–		2 (Note: Appearances in UEFA Cup)	0	–		24	9
Dynamo Dresden	1988–89	DDR-Oberliga	25	6	3	1	–		10	0	–		38	7
Dynamo Dresden	1989–90	DDR-Oberliga	20	9	5	4	–		2 (Note: Appearances in European Cup)	0	–		27	13
Dynamo Dresden	Total		102	38	18	14	–		20	2	–		140	54
VfB Stuttgart	1990–91	Bundesliga	30	11	3	1	–		–		–		33	12
VfB Stuttgart	1991–92	Bundesliga	33	9	3	1	–		3	1	–		39	11
VfB Stuttgart	Total		63	20	6	2	–		3	1	–		72	23
Inter Milan	1992–93	Serie A	11	4	1	0	–		–		–		12	4
Borussia Dortmund	1992–93	Bundesliga	17	10	–		–		–		–		17	10
Borussia Dortmund	1993–94	Bundesliga	29	4	2	0	–		8	0	–		39	4
Borussia Dortmund	1994–95	Bundesliga	28	4	1	1	–		7	0	–		36	5
Borussia Dortmund	1995–96	Bundesliga	22	3	3	1	–		6 (Note: Appearances in UEFA Champions League)	0	1 (Note: Appearance in DFB-Supercup)	0	32	4
Borussia Dortmund	1996–97	Bundesliga	21	0	1	0	–		5	0	1	0	28	0
Borussia Dortmund	1997–98	Bundesliga	3	0	1	0	1	0	1	0	0	0	6	0
Borussia Dortmund	Total		120	21	8	2	1	0	27	0	2	0	158	23
Career total			296	83	33	18	1	0	50	3	2	0	382	104

=== International ===
East Germany

East Germany
Year	Apps	Goals
1986	1	0
1987	0	0
1988	6	1
1989	11	2
1990	5	3
Total	23	6

International goals

Scores and results table. Germany's goal tally first:

#	Date	Venue	Opponent	Score	Result	Competition
1.	31 August 1988	Friedrich-Ludwig-Jahn-Sportpark, East Berlin, East Germany	Greece	1–0	1–0	Friendly
2.	6 September 1989	Laugardalsvöllur, Reykjavík, Iceland	Iceland	1–0	3–0	1990 FIFA World Cup qualifying
3.	8 October 1989	Stadion an der Gellertstraße, Karl-Marx-Stadt, East Germany	Soviet Union	2–1	2–1	1990 FIFA World Cup qualifying
4.	11 April 1990	Stadion an der Gellertstraße, Karl-Marx-Stadt, East Germany	Egypt	2–0	2–0	Friendly
5.	12 September 1990	Constant Vanden Stock Stadium, Brussels, Belgium	Belgium	1–0	2–0	Friendly
6.	12 September 1990	Constant Vanden Stock Stadium, Brussels, Belgium	Belgium	2–0	2–0	Friendly

Germany

Germany
Year	Apps	Goals
1990	1	0
1991	3	0
1992	9	1
1993	6	0
1994	12	2
1995	6	2
1996	11	3
1997	3	0
Total	51	8

International goals

#	Date	Venue	Opponent	Score	Result	Competition
1.	16 December 1992	Estádio Olímpico Monumental, Porto Alegre, Brazil	Brazil	1–2	1–3	Friendly
2.	2 June 1994	Ernst-Happel-Stadion, Vienna, Austria	Austria	1–0	5–1	Friendly
3.	8 June 1994	Varsity Stadium, Toronto, Canada	Canada	1–0	2–0	Friendly
4.	8 October 1995	Ulrich-Haberland-Stadion, Leverkusen, Germany	Moldova	3–0	6–1	UEFA Euro 1996 qualifying
5.	8 October 1995	Ulrich-Haberland-Stadion, Leverkusen, Germany	Moldova	6–0	6–1	UEFA Euro 1996 qualifying
6.	4 June 1996	Carl-Benz-Stadion, Mannheim, Germany	Liechtenstein	5–0	9–1	Friendly
7.	16 June 1996	Old Trafford, Manchester, England	Russia	1–0	3–0	UEFA Euro 1996
8.	23 June 1996	Old Trafford, Manchester, England	Croatia	2–1	2–1	UEFA Euro 1996

=== Coaching statistics ===
As of 30 January 2014

Team	From	To	Record					
Team	From	To	G	W	D	L	Win %	Ref.
Borussia Dortmund	1 July 2000	30 June 2004	183	89	46	48	48.63	
VfB Stuttgart	1 July 2004	3 June 2005	47	25	8	14	53.19	
Total			230	114	54	62	49.57	—

== Honours ==
=== Player ===
Dynamo Dresden

- DDR-Oberliga: 1988–89, 1989–90
- FDGB-Pokal: 1989–90

VfB Stuttgart

- Bundesliga: 1991–92

Borussia Dortmund

- Bundesliga: 1994–95, 1995–96
- DFB-Supercup: 1995, 1996
- UEFA Champions League: 1996–97
- Intercontinental Cup: 1997

Germany

- UEFA European Championship: 1996; runner-up: 1992
- U.S. Cup: 1993

Individual

- Ballon d'Or: 1996
- kicker Bundesliga Team of the Season: 1990–91, 1994–95
- ESM Team of the Year: 1994–95
- Footballer of the Year in Germany: 1995, 1996
- kicker Bundesliga-best libero: 1995, 1996
- kicker Bundesliga-best midfielder: 1993
- UEFA European Championship Player of the Tournament: 1996
- UEFA European Championship Team of the Tournament: 1996
- Onze de Bronze: 1996
- World Soccer: The 100 Greatest Footballers of All Time

=== Manager ===
Borussia Dortmund

- Bundesliga: 2001–02
- DFB-Ligapokal runner-up: 2003
- UEFA Cup runner-up: 2001–02
