= Dirk Kurtenbach =

German former footballer (born 1964)

Personal information
- Date of birth: 2 August 1964 (age 62)
- Place of birth: Bochum, West Germany
- Height: 1.78 m (5 ft 10 in)
- Position: Forward

Senior career*
Years	Team	Apps	(Gls)
1983–1986	Fortuna Köln	92	(31)
1986–1988	Stuttgarter Kickers	62	(21)
1988	Waldhof Mannheim	4	(0)
1988–1990	Hertha BSC	32	(5)
1990–1991	Fortuna Köln	5	(2)
Total		195	(59)
- * Club domestic league appearances and goals

Dirk Kurtenbach (born 2 August 1964) is a German former footballer who played as a forward.

Kurtenbach started his career at 2. Bundesliga side Fortuna Köln in 1983 before signing for Stuttgarter Kickers three years later. He was part of the Stuttgarter Kickers side that reached the 1987 DFB-Pokal Final, scoring their only goal of a 3–1 defeat to Hamburger SV. He was the DFB-Pokal top scorer for the 1986–87 season, having scored 8 goals. He transferred to Waldhof Mannheim of the Bundesliga in summer 1988 before moving to Hertha BSC of the 2. Bundesliga later that year. He returned to Fortuna Köln in summer 1990, where he ended his career.

== Career statistics ==
Appearances and goals by club, season and competition
Club	Season	League			DFB-Pokal		Total	
Club	Season	Division	Apps	Goals	Apps	Goals	Apps	Goals
Fortuna Köln	1983–84	2. Bundesliga	25	7	0	0	25	7
Fortuna Köln	1984–85	2. Bundesliga	36	14	3	2	39	16
Fortuna Köln	1985–86	2. Bundesliga	31	10	1	0	32	10
Fortuna Köln	Total		92	31	4	2	96	33
Stuttgarter Kickers	1986–87	2. Bundesliga	36	16	6	8	42	24
Stuttgarter Kickers	1987–88	2. Bundesliga	26	5	2	0	28	5
Stuttgarter Kickers	Total		62	21	8	8	70	29
Waldhof Mannheim	1988–89	Bundesliga	4	0	0	0	4	0
Hertha BSC	1988–89	2. Bundesliga	19	3	1	0	20	3
Hertha BSC	1989–90	2. Bundesliga	13	2	0	0	13	2
Hertha BSC	Total		32	5	1	0	33	5
Fortuna Köln	1990–91	2. Bundesliga	5	2	1	1	6	3
Career total			195	59	14	11	209	70
