= 1996 Ballon d'Or =

Annual association football award event in France

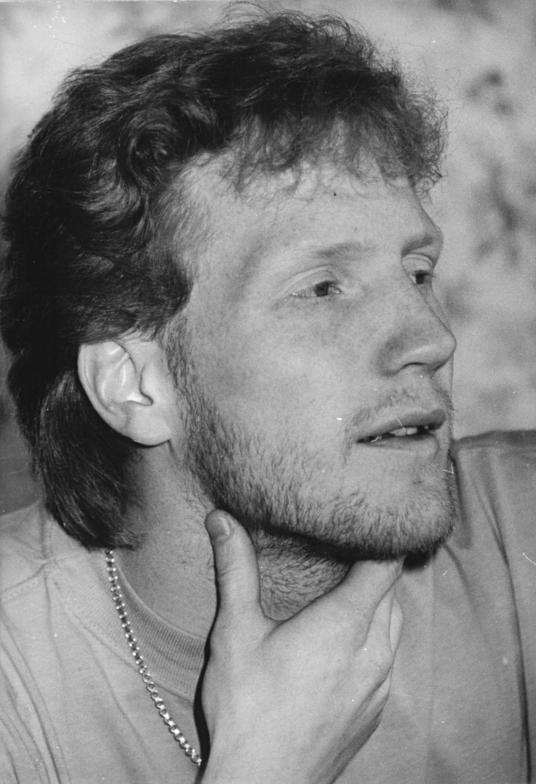
- 1996 Ballon d'Or winner, Matthias Sammer in 1990
- Date: 24 December 1996
- Presented by: France Football

Highlights
- Won by: (Germany) Matthias Sammer (1st award)
- Website: ballondor.com

The 1996 Ballon d'Or, given to the best football player in Europe as judged by a panel of sports journalists from UEFA member countries, was awarded to Matthias Sammer on 24 December 1996.

== Rankings ==
Rank	Player	Club(s)	Nationality	Points
1	Matthias Sammer	(Germany) Borussia Dortmund	Germany	144
2	Ronaldo	(Netherlands) PSV Eindhoven (Spain) Barcelona	Brazil	143 (Note: France Football reports Ronaldo with 141 points. After reviewing each voter's vote, it seems that the vote from Northern Ireland was counted backwards (1st choice was counted as 5th, 2nd as 4th, and so forth).)
3	Alan Shearer	(England) Blackburn Rovers (England) Newcastle United	England	107 (Note: France Football reports Shearer with 109 points. After reviewing each voter's vote, it seems that the vote from Northern Ireland was counted backwards (1st choice was counted as 5th, 2nd as 4th, and so forth).)
4	Alessandro Del Piero	(Italy) Juventus	Italy	69 (Note: France Football reports Del Piero with 65 points. After reviewing each voter's vote, it seems that the vote from Northern Ireland was counted backwards (1st choice was counted as 5th, 2nd as 4th, and so forth).)
5	Jürgen Klinsmann	(Germany) Bayern Munich	Germany	60
6	Davor Šuker	(Spain) Real Madrid	Croatia	38
7	Eric Cantona	(England) Manchester United	France	24
8	Marcel Desailly	(Italy) Milan	France	22
9	Youri Djorkaeff	(Italy) Internazionale	France	20
10	Karel Poborský	(Czech Republic) Slavia Prague (England) Manchester United	Czech Republic	15
11	Nwankwo Kanu	(Netherlands) Ajax (Italy) Internazionale	Nigeria	14
12	George Weah	(Italy) Milan	Liberia	13 (Note: France Football reports Weah with 17 points. After reviewing each voter's vote, it seems that the vote from Northern Ireland was counted backwards (1st choice was counted as 5th, 2nd as 4th, and so forth).)
13	Alen Bokšić	(Italy) Juventus	Croatia	12
13	Gabriel Batistuta	(Italy) Fiorentina	Argentina	12
13	Andreas Köpke	(France) Marseille	Germany	12
16	Fabrizio Ravanelli	(England) Middlesbrough	Italy	9
16	Predrag Mijatović	(Spain) Real Madrid	Yugoslavia	9
18	Didier Deschamps	(Italy) Juventus	France	8
19	Kubilay Türkyilmaz	(Switzerland) Grasshopper	Switzerland	5
20	David Seaman	(England) Arsenal	England	4
20	Raúl	(Spain) Real Madrid	Spain	4
22	Paolo Maldini	(Italy) Milan	Italy	3
22	Christian Ziege	(Germany) Bayern Munich	Germany	3
22	Patrik Berger	(Germany) Borussia Dortmund (England) Liverpool	Czech Republic	3
22	Trifon Ivanov	(Austria) Rapid Wien	Bulgaria	3
26	Radek Bejbl	(Czech Republic) Slavia Prague (Spain) Atlético Madrid	Czech Republic	2
26	Rui Costa	(Italy) Fiorentina	Portugal	2
28	Ronald de Boer	(Netherlands) Ajax	Netherlands	1
28	Luís Figo	(Spain) Barcelona	Portugal	1
28	Brian Laudrup	(Scotland) Rangers	Denmark	1
28	Sergi	(Spain) Barcelona	Spain	1
28	Zinedine Zidane	(Italy) Juventus	France	1

Additionally, eighteen players were nominated but received no votes: Oliver Bierhoff (Udinese & Germany), Laurent Blanc (Auxerre/Barcelona & France), Zvonimir Boban (AC Milan & Croatia), Enrico Chiesa (Sampdoria/Parma & Italy), Edgar Davids (Ajax/AC Milan & Netherlands), Robbie Fowler (Liverpool & England), Thomas Helmer (Bayern Munich & Germany), Bernard Lama (Paris Saint-Germain & France), Jari Litmanen (Ajax & Finland), Andreas Möller (Borussia Dortmund & Germany), Pavel Nedvěd (Sparta Parague/Lazio & Czech Republic), Jay-Jay Okocha (Eintracht Frankfurt/Fenerbahçe & Nigeria), Raí (Paris Saint-Germain & Brazil), Dejan Savićević (AC Milan & Yugoslavia), Mehmet Scholl (Bayern Munich & Germany), Diego Simeone (Atlético Madrid & Argentina), Gianluca Vialli (Juventus/Chelsea & Italy) and Javier Zanetti (Inter Milan & Argentina).
