= Daniel Simmes =

German footballer (born 1966)

Personal information
- Date of birth: 12 August 1966 (age 60)
- Place of birth: Dortmund, West Germany
- Height: 1.82 m (6 ft 0 in)
- Position: Striker

Youth career
- –1979: DJK Karlsglück
- 1979–1984: Borussia Dortmund

Senior career*
Years	Team	Apps	(Gls)
1984–1988	Borussia Dortmund	106	(11)
1988–1991	Karlsruher SC	60	(7)
1991–1995	Lierse	94	(12)
1995–1996	Alemannia Aachen	25	(4)
1996–1997	Wuppertaler SV	18	(2)
1997–1999	FC Denderleeuw	56	(5)
1999–2000	FC Schoten SK	3	(1)
2001–2003	SK Heist		
2003–2004	FC Tremlo		
Total		360	(42)

International career
	West Germany U-21	3	(0)

Managerial career
- SK Wavria (youth)
- –2009: Anderlecht U14
- 2009–2010: Lierse U15
- 2011–2013: KV Turnhout
- 2014–2015: Lierse (women)
- 2019–: OH Leuven (youth)
- * Club domestic league appearances and goals

Daniel Simmes (born 12 August 1966 in Dortmund) is a German football manager and former professional player.

== Managerial career ==
In March 2013 Simmes became assistant manager at Lierse.

In September 2014, he was announced manager of Lierse's women team.

== Honours ==
- Goal of the Year (Germany): 1984
