= Frank Pagelsdorf =

German footballer (born 1958)

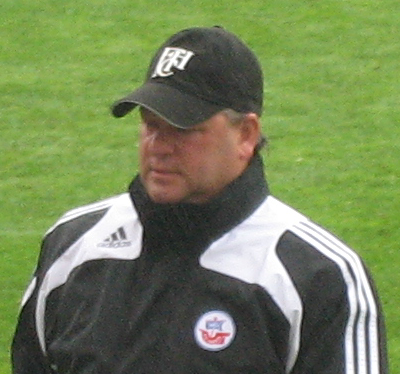
- Pagelsdorf in 2008

Personal information
- Date of birth: 5 February 1958 (age 68)
- Place of birth: Hanover, West Germany
- Height: 1.80 m (5 ft 11 in)
- Position: Midfielder

Youth career
- TuS Garbsen
- –1976: TSV Havelse

Senior career*
Years	Team	Apps	(Gls)
1976–1978	Hannover 96	71	(10)
1978–1984	Arminia Bielefeld	164	(34)
1984–1988	Borussia Dortmund	102	(9)
1989	Hannover 96	28	(5)
Total		365	(58)

International career
1975–1976	West Germany U18	6	(0)
1982–1983	West Germany Olympic	2	(0)

Managerial career
- 1991–1992: Hannover 96 (A)
- 1992–1994: Union Berlin
- 1994–1997: Hansa Rostock
- 1997–2001: Hamburger SV
- 2003–2004: VfL Osnabrück
- 2004–2005: Al-Nasr Dubai
- 2005–2008: Hansa Rostock
- 2009–2010: Al-Nasr Dubai
- * Club domestic league appearances and goals

Frank Pagelsdorf (born 5 February 1958 in Hanover) is a German football manager and former player.

== Coaching career ==
He was manager of Hamburger SV from 1997 to 2001. He has also had a brief time as manager in UAE.
