= Michael Mayer (footballer) =

German footballer (born 1970)

Personal information
- Date of birth: 17 October 1970 (age 56)
- Place of birth: Reutlingen, West Germany
- Height: 1.78 m (5 ft 10 in)
- Position: Midfielder

Youth career
- 1988–1989: VfB Stuttgart

Senior career*
Years	Team	Apps	(Gls)
1991–1992	VfB Stuttgart	1	(0)
1992–2000	SSV Reutlingen		
- * Club domestic league appearances and goals

Michael Mayer (born 17 October 1970) is a retired German football player. He played for one season in the Bundesliga with VfB Stuttgart.

== Honours ==
- Bundesliga champion: 1991–92
