= Christian Hochstätter =

German footballer

Personal information
- Date of birth: 19 October 1963 (age 63)
- Place of birth: Augsburg, West Germany
- Height: 1.80 m (5 ft 11 in)
- Positions: Midfielder; defender

Team information
- Current team: VfL Bochum (sports director)

Youth career
- SV Augsburg
- –1982: FC Augsburg

Senior career*
Years	Team	Apps	(Gls)
1982–1998	Borussia M'gladbach	339	(55)

International career
1987	West Germany	2	(0)
- * Club domestic league appearances and goals

Christian Hochstätter (born 19 October 1963) is a German former professional footballer. He is a nephew of Helmut Haller.

== Club career ==
He appeared in more than 330 (West) German top-flight matches.

== International career ==
Hochstätter played in two friendlies for West Germany in December 1987 – against Brazil and Argentina.

== Post-playing career ==
After his playing career he was director of football for Borussia Mönchengladbach from 1999 to 2005 and for Hannover 96 from 2006 to 2009.

In June 2013, Hochstätter was hired as sports director at VfL Bochum.

== Honours ==
- DFB-Pokal winner: 1994–95
- DFB-Pokal finalist: 1983–84, 1991–92
