= Hans-Georg Dreßen =

German footballer

Personal information
- Date of birth: 30 December 1964 (age 61)
- Place of birth: Mönchengladbach, West Germany
- Height: 1.81 m (5 ft 11 1/2 in)
- Positions: Defender; midfielder

Youth career
- SV Mannesmann Meer

Senior career*
Years	Team	Apps	(Gls)
1982–1989	Borussia Mönchengladbach	125	(21)
1989–1990	1. FC Köln	17	(0)
1990–1991	Borussia Mönchengladbach	5	(0)
1991–1992	1. FC Köln	0	(0)

International career
	Germany U-21	5	(0)
- * Club domestic league appearances and goals

Hans-Georg Dreßen (born 30 December 1964) is a retired German football player.

== Honours ==
- Bundesliga runner-up: 1989–90
- DFB-Pokal finalist: 1983–84
