= Norbert Dickel =

German footballer

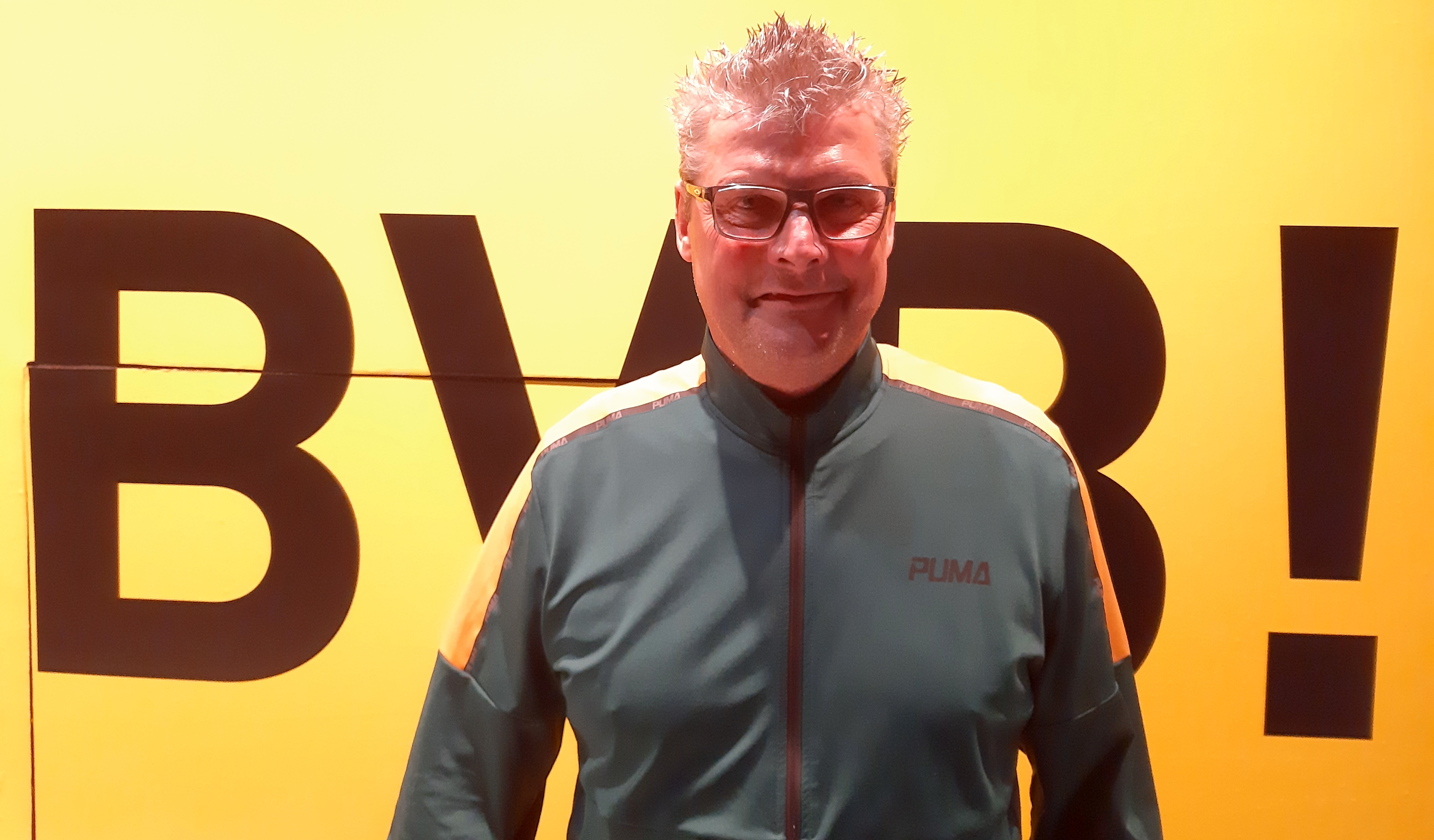

Personal information
- Date of birth: 27 November 1961 (age 64)
- Place of birth: Bad Berleburg, West Germany
- Height: 1.86 m (6 ft 1 in)
- Position: Striker

Youth career
- –1977: SV Netphen
- 1977–1980: Sportfreunde Edertal

Senior career*
Years	Team	Apps	(Gls)
1980–1982	Sportfreunde Edertal		
1982–1984	Sportfreunde Siegen		
1984–1986	Cologne	33	(5)
1986–1990	Borussia Dortmund	90	(40)

International career
1987	Germany U-21	1	(2)
- * Club domestic league appearances and goals

Norbert "Nobby" Dickel (born 27 November 1961 in Bad Berleburg) is a retired German football player. He spent six seasons in the Bundesliga with 1. FC Köln and Borussia Dortmund. He scored two goals in the final of the 1988–89 DFB-Pokal in 1989 for Borussia, helping them to obtain the first major trophy since 1966. He had to retire at 28 years of age due to injuries.

Since 1992 he is announcer in the stadium of Borussia Dortmund and since 2000 commentator for the internet-radio broadcasts of Borussia Dortmund games as well as representing the club on the road.

== Honours ==
Cologne

- UEFA Cup runner-up: 1985–86

Borussia Dortmund

- DFB-Pokal: 1988–89
