= Ditmar Jakobs =

German former footballer (born 1953)

Personal information
- Full name: Ditmar Jakobs
- Date of birth: 28 August 1953 (age 73)
- Place of birth: Oberhausen, West Germany
- Height: 1.80 m (5 ft 11 in)
- Position: Centre back

Senior career*
Years	Team	Apps	(Gls)
1971–1974	Rot-Weiß Oberhausen	45	(12)
1974–1977	Tennis Borussia Berlin	101	(16)
1977–1979	MSV Duisburg	68	(2)
1979–1989	Hamburger SV	323	(37)
Total		537	(67)

International career
1980–1986	West Germany	20	(1)
- * Club domestic league appearances and goals

Ditmar Jakobs (born 28 August 1953) is a German former footballer who played as a defender. He played as a centre-back, a classical libero in the mold of Franz Beckenbauer or Willi Schulz.

Jakobs played 493 games from 1971 to 1990 for Rot-Weiß Oberhausen, Tennis Borussia Berlin, MSV Duisburg, and Hamburger SV. With Hamburger SV, he won the 1987 DFB-Pokal. In 1982 and 1983, he became German champion and in 1983, he won the European Cup.

Jakobs was a member of the Germany national team that was runner-up in the 1986 FIFA World Cup in Mexico. From 1980 to 1986, he collected 20 caps for the team.

== Accident ==
Jakobs' career ended prematurely on 20 September 1989 in a game between Hamburger SV and Werder Bremen. When an attacker lobbed the Hamburger SV goalie, Jakobs lunged feet-first into his goal and scraped the ball off the line. However, he fell into the hooks fixing the goal to the ground (at that time, the hooks were not stipulated to be under the earth). He hung there for 20 agonising minutes, the hook deeply embedded in his flesh. Finally, the team doctor cut the hooks from his back with a scalpel. With this, the nerves in his back were cut. Because of this horrible accident, he was forced to end his career. However, he regards himself lucky, as the hook missed his spinal cords by a mere two inches.

Following his career, Jakobs became an insurance broker in Norderstedt, near Hamburg.

== Honours ==
Hamburger SV

- Bundesliga: 1981–82, 1982–83
- DFB-Pokal: 1986–87
- European Cup: 1982–83

West Germany

- FIFA World Cup runner-up: 1986
