= Tobias Homp =

German footballer and manager

Personal information
- Date of birth: 31 October 1963 (age 62)
- Place of birth: Kiel, West Germany
- Height: 1.71 m (5 ft 7 in)
- Position: Midfielder

Youth career
- TSV Melsdorf

Senior career*
Years	Team	Apps	(Gls)
–1985	FC Kilia Kiel		
1985–1989	Hamburger SV	75	(3)
1989–1995	FC Homburg	191	(7)
1995–1997	Hamburger SV	5	(0)
1997–1999	Hamburger SV II		
1999–2011	SV Henstedt-Ulzburg		

Managerial career
- 2007–2011: SV Henstedt-Rhen (assistant)
- 2011–2015: SV Henstedt-Rhen U19
- * Club domestic league appearances and goals

Tobias Homp (born 31 October 1963, in Kiel) is a German football manager and former football player.

== Honours ==
Hamburger SV

- DFB-Pokal: 1986–87
