= Fritz Walter (footballer, born 1960) =

German footballer (born 1960)

Personal information
- Full name: Fritz Walter
- Date of birth: 21 July 1960 (age 66)
- Place of birth: Mannheim, West Germany
- Height: 1.72 m (5 ft 8 in)
- Position: Striker

Youth career
- 1965–1976: SG Hohensachsen
- 1976–1978: FV Weinheim

Senior career*
Years	Team	Apps	(Gls)
1978–1981	FV Weinheim	87	(55)
1981–1987	Waldhof Mannheim	196	(87)
1987–1994	VfB Stuttgart	216	(102)
1994–1997	Arminia Bielefeld	50	(25)
1997–1999	SSV Ulm 1846	9	(6)
Total		558	(275)

International career
1987–1988	West Germany Olympic	8	(3)
Medal record
Representing West Germany
Men's Football
Bronze medal – third place	1988 Seoul	Team competition
- * Club domestic league appearances and goals

Fritz Walter (born 21 July 1960) is a German former professional footballer who played as a striker, and who was nicknamed "Little Fritz". Born in Mannheim, he is of no relation to German legend of the same name Fritz Walter.

With 22 goals in the 1991–92 Bundesliga season, Fritz Walter was crowned the league's top scorer when he won the German Championship with VfB Stuttgart.

== Career statistics ==
Appearances and goals by club, season and competition
Club	Season	League		
Club	Season	Division	Apps	Goals
Waldhof Mannheim	1981–82	2. Bundesliga	32	11
Waldhof Mannheim	1982–83	2. Bundesliga	35	21
Waldhof Mannheim	1983–84	Bundesliga	34	16
Waldhof Mannheim	1984–85	Bundesliga	31	7
Waldhof Mannheim	1985–86	Bundesliga	31	9
Waldhof Mannheim	1986–87	Bundesliga	33	23
Waldhof Mannheim	Total		196	87
VfB Stuttgart	1987–88	Bundesliga	33	16
VfB Stuttgart	1988–89	Bundesliga	33	13
VfB Stuttgart	1989–90	Bundesliga	31	13
VfB Stuttgart	1990–91	Bundesliga	26	12
VfB Stuttgart	1991–92	Bundesliga	38	22
VfB Stuttgart	1992–93	Bundesliga	28	13
VfB Stuttgart	1993–94	Bundesliga	27	13
VfB Stuttgart	Total		216	102
Arminia Bielefeld	1994–95	Regionalliga	14	4
Arminia Bielefeld	1995–96	2. Bundesliga	33	21
Arminia Bielefeld	1996–97	Bundesliga	3	0
Arminia Bielefeld	Total		50	25
SSV Ulm	1997–98	Regionalliga	6	6
SSV Ulm	1998–99	2. Bundesliga	3	0
SSV Ulm	Total		9	6
Career total			471	220

== Honours ==
VfB Stuttgart

- Bundesliga: 1991–92
- DFL-Supercup: 1992
- UEFA Cup runner-up: 1988–89

Germany U23

- Olympic bronze medal: 1988

Individual

- Bundesliga top scorer: 1991–92
