= Frank Schmöller =

German footballer and manager

Personal information
- Date of birth: 21 August 1966 (age 60)
- Place of birth: Niendorf, West Germany
- Height: 1.87 m (6 ft 2 in)
- Position: Forward

Youth career
- –1985: Hamburger SV

Senior career*
Years	Team	Apps	(Gls)
1985–1987	Hamburger SV	29	(4)
1987–1988	Waldhof Mannheim	19	(0)
1988–1989	Lierse		
1989–1992	KFC Germinal Ekeren		
1992–1994	Hertha BSC	53	(14)
1995	Fortuna Köln	12	(1)
1995–1997	SpVgg Unterhaching	42	(11)

Managerial career
- 2002–2008: SV Heimstetten
- 2009–2013: FC Ismaning
- 2013–2019: SV Pullach
- 2019–2021: 1860 Munich II
- 2023–2024: 1860 Munich (caretaker)
- * Club domestic league appearances and goals

Frank Schmöller (born 21 August 1966) is a German football coach and former player.

== Playing career ==
Schmöller played as a forward and during his thirteen year professional career, he appeared for seven different clubs in Germany and Belgium, most notably for Hamburger SV. With HSV, he won the DFB-Pokal in 1987, scoring two goals in the round of 16 win over rivals FC St. Pauli on 19 November 1986 and appearing in the final against Stuttgarter Kickers as a second-half substitute.

In total, Schmöller made 48 appearances in the Bundesliga, scoring 4 goals, and appeared a further 107 times in the 2. Bundesliga adding 26 goals.

== Managerial career ==
After his playing career, he went into management, starting with lower-division Bavarian side SV Heimstetten in 2002. Most recently, he was the manager of 1860 Munich II, a position he held from July 2019 until June 2021. In December 2023, he was named the interim head coach of 1860 Munich until January 2024.

== Honours ==
Hamburger SV

- DFB-Pokal: 1986–87
