= VfL Hamm/Sieg =

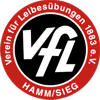
- Full name: Verein für Leibesübungen 1883 e.V. Hamm/Sieg
- Founded: 1883
- Ground: VfL Stadion
- Capacity: 5,000
- Chairman: Axel Mast
- Manager: Jens Hannas
- League: Bezirksliga Rheinland-Ost (VII)
- 2015–16: 9th
Home colours	Away colours

VfL Hamm/Sieg is a German association football club from the town of Hamm, Rhineland-Palatinate. The club's greatest success has been promotion to the tier three Oberliga Südwest in 1982 and 1985, with the club spending nineteen seasons at this level until relegation in 2003.

Hamm has also participated five times in the first round of the DFB-Pokal, the German Cup, courtesy to Rhineland Cup wins.

== History ==
Formed as TV Hamm in 1883 the club first fielded a football team in 1908. This team left the club in 1916 to form an independent club, the 1. FC Einigkeit Hamm. The club soon folded again and the footballers returned to TV but were forced to leave the club in the 1920s to form Sportfreunde Hamm. In 1935 this club folded again and the footballers once more returned to TV, now permanently. The club changed its name to the current one, VfL Hamm, after this but the football team was forced to restart at the bottom of the league system. The football team withdrew from competition during the Second World War but restarted in 1945. The team rose as high as the tier four 2. Amateurliga between 1957 and 1962 but then descended the league system again.

VfL Hamm earned promotion to the highest league of the Rhineland Football Association, the Verbandsliga Rheinland, now the Rheinlandliga, in 1978. The first two seasons in the league saw the club struggle but it improved after this and won the league in 1982. Hamm was promoted to the tier-three Oberliga Südwest but finished last in the league and was relegated again. The club came runners-up in the Verbandsliga in 1984 and won another league championship the season after, thereby being promoted to the Oberliga again. It also made its first German Cup appearance in this era when it lost 4–6 after extra time to fellow amateur side Urania Hamburg in 1981.

For the next eighteen seasons VfL Hamm played in the Oberliga Südwest. Initially a tier-three league, the Oberliga dropped to fourth tier when the Regionalligas were introduced in 1994. Hamm's first four seasons saw the club finish in the upper half of the table, coming third in 1987. The 1985–86 and 1986–87 season saw the club also win the Rhineland Cup. On both occasions this qualified VfL for the first round of the German Cup, where it lost to FC Gütersloh on penalties in the replay in 1986 and 2–7 to KSV Hessen Kassel in 1987. Between 1989 and 1995 the club entered a less successful era in the Oberliga, mostly struggling against relegation.

VfL Hamm improved again after 1995, finishing in the top half of the table for the next seven seasons. The club's most successful seasons were between 1998 and 2001, with runners-up finishes in the league in 2000 and 2001 and two more cup wins in 1999 and 2000. VfL played in the first round of the DFB-Pokal two more times, in 1999 and 2000, losing to Stuttgarter Kickers and Energie Cottbus respectively.

From 2001 the club declined markedly, finishing eight in the league in 2002 and sixteenth in 2003, the latter result meaning relegation for VfL. It managed another runners-up finish in the Rheinlandliga in 2004 and still finished fourth the season after. VfL Hamm suffered a rapid decline from there, finishing last in the league in 2005 and being altogether unable to field a team the season after. It consequently had to drop down to the tier seven Kreisliga A and continued its descent in the following seasons, suffering consecutive relegations. In 2007–08 it finish third-last in the league, losing all 26 season games, scoring only eight goals and conceding 138. The 2008–09 season was only marginally better, again finishing last but recording one win and five draws in 26 games. It reached a low point in 2009–10 when it played in the tier-ten Kreisliga C but made a recovery from there that took it back up to the tier-seven Bezirksliga. Relegated from there again in 2014 it played in the Kreisliga A for another season, winning a championship and promotion in 2015.

== Honours ==
The club's honours:

=== League ===
- Oberliga Südwest
  - Runners-up: 2000, 2001
- Rheinlandliga
  - Champions: 1982, 1985
  - Runners-up: 1984, 2004

=== Cup ===
- Rhineland Cup
  - Winners: 1986, 1987, 1999, 2000
  - Runners-up: 1981, 1989

== Recent seasons ==
The recent season-by-season performance of the club:

Season	Division	Tier	Position
2000–01	Oberliga Südwest	IV	2nd
2001–02	Oberliga Südwest	IV	8th
2002–03	Oberliga Südwest	IV	16th↓
2003–04	Rheinlandliga	V	2nd
2004–05	Rheinlandliga	V	4th
2005–06	Rheinlandliga	V	16th↓
2006–07	inactive		
2007–08	Kreisliga A	VII	14th↓
2008–09	Kreisliga B	IX	14th↓
2009–10	Kreisliga C	X	2nd↑
2011–11	Kreisliga B	IX	2nd ↑
2011–12	Kreisliga A	VIII	6th
2012–13	Kreisliga A	VIII	1st ↑
2013–14	Bezirksliga Ost	VII	14th ↓
2014–15	Kreisliga A	VIII	1st ↑
2015–16	Bezirksliga Ost	VII	9th
2016–17	Bezirksliga Ost	VII	

- With the introduction of the Regionalligas in 1994 and the 3. Liga in 2008 as the new third tier, below the 2. Bundesliga, all leagues below dropped one tier.

↑ Promoted	↓ Relegated
