= Sascha Jusufi =

German footballer

Personal information
- Birth name: Saša Jusufi
- Date of birth: 20 January 1963 (age 63)
- Place of birth: Belgrade, SR Serbia, SFR Yugoslavia
- Height: 1.80 m (5 ft 11 in)
- Position: Midfielder

Youth career
- FC Schalke 04

Senior career*
Years	Team	Apps	(Gls)
1981–1984	Bayer Uerdingen	74	(2)
1984–1986	1. FC Saarbrücken	63	(13)
1986–1991	Hamburger SV	112	(12)
1991–1992	FC Schalke 04		
- * Club domestic league appearances and goals

Sascha Jusufi (born Saša Jusufi, on 20 January 1963) is a retired German football player.

His father is Partizan Belgrade legend Fahrudin Jusufi.

== Honours ==
- DFB-Pokal: 1986–87
- Bundesliga: runner-up 1986–87
