= Manfred Kastl =

German footballer

Personal information
- Date of birth: 23 September 1965 (age 61)
- Place of birth: West Germany
- Height: 1.86 m (6 ft 1 in)
- Position: Striker

Senior career*
Years	Team	Apps	(Gls)
–1986	SpVgg Fürth		
1986–1988	Hamburger SV	37	(17)
1988–1989	Bayer 04 Leverkusen	26	(6)
1989–1992	VfB Stuttgart	59	(8)
1992–1993	SSV Ulm 1846		
1993–1994	VfR Pforzheim		

International career
1987	Germany U-21	2	(0)
- * Club domestic league appearances and goals

Manfred Kastl (born 23 September 1965) is a retired German football player.

== Honours ==
Hamburg

- DFB-Pokal: 1986–87

VfB Stuttgart

- Bundesliga: 1991–92
