= Niels Schlotterbeck =

German footballer

Personal information
- Date of birth: 12 March 1967 (age 59)
- Place of birth: Stuttgart, Germany
- Height: 1.87 m (6 ft 2 in)
- Position: Midfielder

Senior career*
Years	Team	Apps	(Gls)
–1989	Stuttgarter Kickers	85	(8)
1989–1990	Offenburger FV	11	(3)
1990–1991	SC Freiburg	11	(3)
1991–1992	MSV Duisburg	6	(0)
1992	Hansa Rostock	8	(2)
1992–1994	1860 Munich	60	(11)
1994–1995	Hannover 96	22	(0)
1995–1996	SK Vorwärts Steyr	2	(0)
1996	Qadsia SC		
1996–1997	Waldhof Mannheim	18	(0)
1997–1998	APOEL FC		
- FV Dudenhofen
- * Club domestic league appearances and goals

Niels Schlotterbeck (born 12 March 1967) is a German former professional footballer who played as a midfielder.

== Personal life ==
He is the uncle of Southampton’s Keven Schlotterbeck and Nico Schlotterbeck of Borussia Dortmund.
