= 1986–87 DFB-Pokal =

Tournament details
- Country: West Germany
- Teams: 64

Final positions
- Champions: Hamburger SV
- Runners-up: Stuttgarter Kickers

Tournament statistics
- Matches played: 70

The 1986–87 DFB-Pokal was the 44th season of the annual German football cup competition. It began on 27 August 1986 and ended on 20 June 1987. 64 teams competed in the tournament of six rounds. In the final Hamburger SV defeated Stuttgarter Kickers 3–1.

== Matches ==
=== First round ===
27 August 1986
SC Charlottenburg	0 – 3	SV Darmstadt 98
TSG Giengen	1 – 3	Hannover 96
SV Werder Bremen	0 – 0	Alemannia Aachen	(AET)
Eintracht Frankfurt	3 – 1	Eintracht Braunschweig
Hamburger SV	3 – 0	SG Union Solingen
Rot-Weiß Lüdenscheid	2 – 4	1. FC Saarbrücken	(AET)
Tennis Borussia Berlin	0 – 5	Stuttgarter Kickers
Blau-Weiß Friedrichstadt	1 – 0	FV Hassia Bingen
VfL Wolfsburg	2 – 2	Karlsruher SC	(AET)
DSC Wanne-Eickel	2 – 4	Blau-Weiß 90 Berlin
SV 1916 Sandhausen	0 – 1	Fortuna Köln
Viktoria Köln	2 – 5	SC Freiburg
Viktoria Goch	0 – 3	FC 08 Homburg
1. FC Amberg	0 – 7	Borussia Mönchengladbach
VfR Aalen	0 – 2	Fortuna Düsseldorf
1. FSV Mainz 05	1 – 0	FC Schalke 04
TSV Stelingen	1 – 5	Arminia Bielefeld
Bayer Uerdingen	6 – 4	VfB Stuttgart
SKV Mörfelden	1 – 3	Borussia Neunkirchen
SV Meppen	1 – 2	MSV Duisburg
SpVgg Bayreuth	0 – 3	SG Wattenscheid 09	(AET)
Rot-Weiß Oberhausen	1 – 3	Borussia Dortmund
FC Emmendingen	0 – 4	1. FC Köln
Bayer 04 Leverkusen	6 – 0	VfL Osnabrück
VfL Hamm	1 – 1	FC Gütersloh	(AET)
TSV 1860 München	1 – 5	FC Augsburg	(AET)
Viktoria Aschaffenburg	1 – 2	SV Waldhof Mannheim
VfL Bochum	1 – 2	FC St. Pauli
Bremer SV	2 – 2	KSV Hessen Kassel	(AET)
BVL 08 Remscheid	3 – 0	1. FC Kaiserslautern
FSV Frankfurt	2 – 8	1. FC Nürnberg
Hertha BSC	1 – 2	FC Bayern Munich

==== Replays ====
10 September 1986
FC Gütersloh	5 – 4	VfL Hamm	(PSO)
KSV Hessen Kassel	4 – 4	Bremer SV	(PSO)
23 September 1986
Alemannia Aachen	7 – 6	SV Werder Bremen	(PSO)
Karlsruher SC	4 – 1	VfL Wolfsburg	(AET)

=== Second round ===
24 October 1986
FC Augsburg	1 – 2	Hamburger SV
MSV Duisburg	1 – 1	SG Wattenscheid 09	(AET)
Fortuna Köln	1 – 1	SC Freiburg
Arminia Bielefeld	0 – 2	Karlsruher SC
Alemannia Aachen	4 – 0	1. FC Saarbrücken
Bayer Uerdingen	3 – 2	1. FC Nürnberg
FC 08 Homburg	1 – 3	FC Bayern Munich
FC Gütersloh	0 – 5	Blau-Weiß 90 Berlin
Fortuna Düsseldorf	2 – 1	Bayer 04 Leverkusen	(AET)
1. FC Köln	3 – 1	SV Waldhof Mannheim
Bremer SV	0 – 3	FC St. Pauli
Blau-Weiß Friedrichstadt	1 – 2	SV Darmstadt 98
Borussia Neunkirchen	2 – 3	Stuttgarter Kickers
1. FSV Mainz 05	0 – 1	Eintracht Frankfurt	(AET)
Borussia Mönchengladbach	6 – 1	Borussia Dortmund
BVL 08 Remscheid	3 – 3	Hanover 96	(AET)

==== Replays ====
11 November 1986
SC Freiburg	1 – 2	Fortuna Köln
12 November 1986
SG Wattenscheid 09	2 – 1	MSV Duisburg
Hannover 96	2 – 1	BVL 08 Remscheid

=== Round of 16 ===
18 November 1986
Fortuna Düsseldorf	3 – 0	FC Bayern Munich
SG Wattenscheid 09	1 – 3	Eintracht Frankfurt
Stuttgarter Kickers	2 – 0	Hannover 96
Hamburger SV	6 – 0	FC St. Pauli
Blau-Weiß 90 Berlin	1 – 2	Karlsruher SC
Fortuna Köln	0 – 2	SV Darmstadt 98	(AET)
Alemannia Aachen	0 – 2	Borussia Mönchengladbach	(AET)
Bayer Uerdingen	3 – 1	1. FC Köln

=== Quarter-finals ===
7 March 1987
SV Darmstadt 98	0 – 1	Hamburger SV
Fortuna Düsseldorf	1 – 0	Karlsruher SC
Borussia Mönchengladbach	9 – 2	Bayer Uerdingen
Stuttgarter Kickers	3 – 1	Eintracht Frankfurt

=== Semi-finals ===
31 March 1987
Hamburger SV	1 – 0	Borussia Mönchengladbach
Stuttgarter Kickers	3 – 0	Fortuna Düsseldorf

=== Final ===
20 June 1987
18:00 CEST

Hamburger SV	3–1	Stuttgarter Kickers
Beiersdorfer 15'; Kaltz 88'; Schlotterbeck 90' (o.g.)	Report	Kurtenbach 13'

Olympiastadion, West Berlin
Attendance: 76,000
Referee: Peter Gabor (West Berlin)
