= 1951 FA Charity Shield =

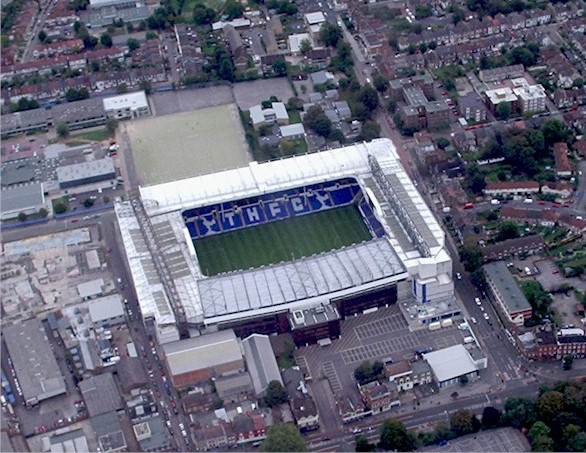
- White Hart Lane in London hosted the match.
Tottenham Hotspur	Newcastle United
2	1
- Date: 24 September 1951
- Venue: White Hart Lane, London
- Attendance: 27,760

The 1951 FA Charity Shield was the 29th FA Charity Shield, an annual football match played between the winners of the previous season's Football League and FA Cup competitions. The match took place on 24 September 1951 and was played between 1950–51 Football League champions Tottenham Hotspur and FA Cup winners Newcastle United. It ended in a 2–1 victory for Tottenham Hotspur.

== Background ==
Newcastle United won their fourth FA Cup title after beating Blackpool 2–0 in the final. They were appearing in their third FA Community Shield match, having won one (1909), and lost one (1932).

Tottenham Hotspur won their first ever First Division title in 1950–51 season. They were also appearing in their third match, having won one (1921) and lost one (1920).

=== Details ===
24 September 1951
19:00 BST

Tottenham Hotspur	2–1	Newcastle United
Murphy ?'; Bennett 55'	Report	Milburn ?'

White Hart Lane, London
Attendance: 27,760

Tottenham Hotspur	Newcastle United

GK	(England) Ted Ditchburn
CB	(England) Harry Clarke
CB	(England) Arthur Willis
CB	(England) Charlie Withers
CM	(Wales) Ron Burgess
CM	(England) Peter Murphy
CM	(England) Bill Nicholson
LW	(England) Les Medley
RW	(England) Sonny Walters
SS	(England) Les Bennett
CF	(Guernsey) Len Duquemin
Manager:
(England) Arthur Rowe

GK	(Scotland) Ronnie Simpson
RB	(Scotland) Frank Brennan
CB	(Northern Ireland) Alf McMichael
CB	(England) Joe Harvey
LB	(Chile) Ted Robledo
CM	(England) Tommy Walker
LW	(Scotland) Bobby Mitchell
SS	(England) George Hannah
CF	(Scotland) John Duncan
CF	(England) Jackie Milburn
LF	(Chile) George Robledo
Manager:
(England) Stan Seymour

- 90 minutes
- Penalty shoot-out if scores still level

== See also ==
- 1950–51 Football League
- 1950–51 FA Cup
