= 1951–52 in English football =

Football in England
- Season: 1951–52

Men's football
- First Division: Manchester United
- Second Division: Sheffield Wednesday
- FA Cup: Newcastle United

The 1951–52 season was the 72nd season of competitive football in England.

== Overview ==
Four years after guiding them to glory in the FA Cup, Matt Busby guided Manchester United to their first league title triumph in 41 years. While still captained by Johnny Carey and featuring several other players from the 1948 FA Cup winning team, Busby was now giving regular action to young players including Roger Byrne, Johnny Berry and Jackie Blanchflower, and had already invested in the future by making a move for the young goalkeeper Ray Wood.

Tottenham Hotspur, the previous season's champions, had to settle for second place this season.

Newcastle United retained the FA Cup, the centrepiece of their team being the forward line-up of Jackie Milburn and the Chilean brothers George and Ted Robledo.

== Honours ==
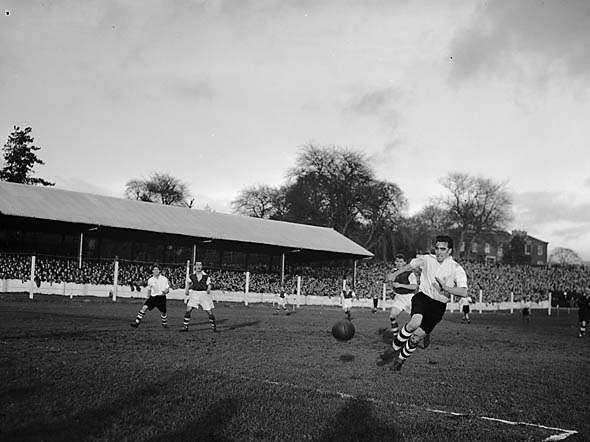
Merthyr and Ipswich play in the 1951–52 FA Cup

| Competition | Winner | Runner-up |
|---|---|---|
| First Division | Manchester United (3) | Tottenham Hotspur |
| Second Division | Sheffield Wednesday | Cardiff City |
| Third Division North | Lincoln City | Grimsby Town |
| Third Division South | Plymouth Argyle | Reading |
| FA Cup | Newcastle United (5) | Arsenal |
| Charity Shield | Tottenham Hotspur | Newcastle United |
| Home Championship | Shared by England & Wales | |

Notes = Number in parentheses is the times that club has won that honour. * indicates new record for competition

== Football League ==
=== First Division ===
| Pos | Team | Pld | W | D | L | GF | GA | GAv | Pts | Relegation |
|---|---|---|---|---|---|---|---|---|---|---|
| 1 | Manchester United (C) | 42 | 23 | 11 | 8 | 95 | 52 | 1.827 | 57 | |
| 2 | Tottenham Hotspur | 42 | 22 | 9 | 11 | 76 | 51 | 1.490 | 53 | |
| 3 | Arsenal | 42 | 21 | 11 | 10 | 80 | 61 | 1.311 | 53 | |
| 4 | Portsmouth | 42 | 20 | 8 | 14 | 68 | 58 | 1.172 | 48 | |
| 5 | Bolton Wanderers | 42 | 19 | 10 | 13 | 65 | 61 | 1.066 | 48 | |
| 6 | Aston Villa | 42 | 19 | 9 | 14 | 79 | 70 | 1.129 | 47 | |
| 7 | Preston North End | 42 | 17 | 12 | 13 | 74 | 54 | 1.370 | 46 | |
| 8 | Newcastle United | 42 | 18 | 9 | 15 | 98 | 73 | 1.342 | 45 | |
| 9 | Blackpool | 42 | 18 | 9 | 15 | 64 | 64 | 1.000 | 45 | |
| 10 | Charlton Athletic | 42 | 17 | 10 | 15 | 68 | 63 | 1.079 | 44 | |
| 11 | Liverpool | 42 | 12 | 19 | 11 | 57 | 61 | 0.934 | 43 | |
| 12 | Sunderland | 42 | 15 | 12 | 15 | 70 | 61 | 1.148 | 42 | |
| 13 | West Bromwich Albion | 42 | 14 | 13 | 15 | 74 | 77 | 0.961 | 41 | |
| 14 | Burnley | 42 | 15 | 10 | 17 | 56 | 63 | 0.889 | 40 | |
| 15 | Manchester City | 42 | 13 | 13 | 16 | 58 | 61 | 0.951 | 39 | |
| 16 | Wolverhampton Wanderers | 42 | 12 | 14 | 16 | 73 | 73 | 1.000 | 38 | |
| 17 | Derby County | 42 | 15 | 7 | 20 | 63 | 80 | 0.788 | 37 | |
| 18 | Middlesbrough | 42 | 15 | 6 | 21 | 64 | 88 | 0.727 | 36 | |
| 19 | Chelsea | 42 | 14 | 8 | 20 | 52 | 72 | 0.722 | 36 | |
| 20 | Stoke City | 42 | 12 | 7 | 23 | 49 | 88 | 0.557 | 31 | |
| 21 | Huddersfield Town (R) | 42 | 10 | 8 | 24 | 49 | 82 | 0.598 | 28 | Relegation to the Second Division |
| 22 | Fulham (R) | 42 | 8 | 11 | 23 | 58 | 77 | 0.753 | 27 | Relegation to the Second Division |

Source: World Football
Rules for classification: 1) Points; 2) Goal average; 3) Goals scored
(C) Champions; (R) Relegated

=== Second Division ===
| Pos | Team | Pld | W | D | L | GF | GA | GAv | Pts | Qualification or relegation |
|---|---|---|---|---|---|---|---|---|---|---|
| 1 | Sheffield Wednesday (C, P) | 42 | 21 | 11 | 10 | 100 | 66 | 1.515 | 53 | Promotion to the First Division |
| 2 | Cardiff City (P) | 42 | 20 | 11 | 11 | 72 | 54 | 1.333 | 51 | Promotion to the First Division |
| 3 | Birmingham City | 42 | 21 | 9 | 12 | 67 | 56 | 1.196 | 51 | |
| 4 | Nottingham Forest | 42 | 18 | 13 | 11 | 77 | 62 | 1.242 | 49 | |
| 5 | Leicester City | 42 | 19 | 9 | 14 | 78 | 64 | 1.219 | 47 | |
| 6 | Leeds United | 42 | 18 | 11 | 13 | 59 | 57 | 1.035 | 47 | |
| 7 | Everton | 42 | 17 | 10 | 15 | 64 | 58 | 1.103 | 44 | |
| 8 | Luton Town | 42 | 16 | 12 | 14 | 77 | 78 | 0.987 | 44 | |
| 9 | Rotherham United | 42 | 17 | 8 | 17 | 73 | 71 | 1.028 | 42 | |
| 10 | Brentford | 42 | 15 | 12 | 15 | 54 | 55 | 0.982 | 42 | |
| 11 | Sheffield United | 42 | 18 | 5 | 19 | 90 | 76 | 1.184 | 41 | |
| 12 | West Ham United | 42 | 15 | 11 | 16 | 67 | 77 | 0.870 | 41 | |
| 13 | Southampton | 42 | 15 | 11 | 16 | 61 | 73 | 0.836 | 41 | |
| 14 | Blackburn Rovers | 42 | 17 | 6 | 19 | 54 | 63 | 0.857 | 40 | |
| 15 | Notts County | 42 | 16 | 7 | 19 | 71 | 68 | 1.044 | 39 | |
| 16 | Doncaster Rovers | 42 | 13 | 12 | 17 | 55 | 60 | 0.917 | 38 | |
| 17 | Bury | 42 | 15 | 7 | 20 | 67 | 69 | 0.971 | 37 | |
| 18 | Hull City | 42 | 13 | 11 | 18 | 60 | 70 | 0.857 | 37 | |
| 19 | Swansea Town | 42 | 12 | 12 | 18 | 72 | 76 | 0.947 | 36 | |
| 20 | Barnsley | 42 | 11 | 14 | 17 | 59 | 72 | 0.819 | 36 | |
| 21 | Coventry City (R) | 42 | 14 | 6 | 22 | 59 | 82 | 0.720 | 34 | Relegation to the Third Division South |
| 22 | Queens Park Rangers (R) | 42 | 11 | 12 | 19 | 52 | 81 | 0.642 | 34 | Relegation to the Third Division South |

Rules for classification: 1) Points; 2) Goal average; 3) Goals scored
(C) Champions; (P) Promoted; (R) Relegated

=== Third Division North ===
| Pos | Team | Pld | W | D | L | GF | GA | GAv | Pts | Promotion |
|---|---|---|---|---|---|---|---|---|---|---|
| 1 | Lincoln City (C, P) | 46 | 30 | 9 | 7 | 121 | 52 | 2.327 | 69 | Promotion to the Second Division |
| 2 | Grimsby Town | 46 | 29 | 8 | 9 | 96 | 45 | 2.133 | 66 | |
| 3 | Stockport County | 46 | 23 | 13 | 10 | 74 | 40 | 1.850 | 59 | |
| 4 | Oldham Athletic | 46 | 24 | 9 | 13 | 90 | 61 | 1.475 | 57 | |
| 5 | Gateshead | 46 | 21 | 11 | 14 | 66 | 49 | 1.347 | 53 | |
| 6 | Mansfield Town | 46 | 22 | 8 | 16 | 73 | 60 | 1.217 | 52 | |
| 7 | Carlisle United | 46 | 19 | 13 | 14 | 62 | 57 | 1.088 | 51 | |
| 8 | Bradford (Park Avenue) | 46 | 19 | 12 | 15 | 74 | 64 | 1.156 | 50 | |
| 9 | Hartlepools United | 46 | 21 | 8 | 17 | 71 | 65 | 1.092 | 50 | |
| 10 | York City | 46 | 18 | 13 | 15 | 73 | 52 | 1.404 | 49 | |
| 11 | Tranmere Rovers | 46 | 21 | 6 | 19 | 76 | 71 | 1.070 | 48 | |
| 12 | Barrow | 46 | 17 | 12 | 17 | 57 | 61 | 0.934 | 46 | |
| 13 | Chesterfield | 46 | 17 | 11 | 18 | 65 | 66 | 0.985 | 45 | |
| 14 | Scunthorpe & Lindsey United | 46 | 14 | 16 | 16 | 65 | 74 | 0.878 | 44 | |
| 15 | Bradford City | 46 | 16 | 10 | 20 | 61 | 68 | 0.897 | 42 | |
| 16 | Crewe Alexandra | 46 | 17 | 8 | 21 | 63 | 82 | 0.768 | 42 | |
| 17 | Southport | 46 | 15 | 11 | 20 | 53 | 71 | 0.746 | 41 | |
| 18 | Wrexham | 46 | 15 | 9 | 22 | 63 | 73 | 0.863 | 39 | |
| 19 | Chester | 46 | 15 | 9 | 22 | 72 | 85 | 0.847 | 39 | |
| 20 | Halifax Town | 46 | 14 | 7 | 25 | 61 | 97 | 0.629 | 35 | |
| 21 | Rochdale | 46 | 11 | 13 | 22 | 47 | 79 | 0.595 | 35 | |
| 22 | Accrington Stanley | 46 | 10 | 12 | 24 | 61 | 92 | 0.663 | 32 | |
| 23 | Darlington | 46 | 11 | 9 | 26 | 64 | 103 | 0.621 | 31 | Re-elected |
| 24 | Workington | 46 | 11 | 7 | 28 | 50 | 91 | 0.549 | 29 | Re-elected |

Source: rsssf.com
(C) Champions; (P) Promoted

=== Third Division South ===
| Pos | Team | Pld | W | D | L | GF | GA | GAv | Pts | Promotion |
|---|---|---|---|---|---|---|---|---|---|---|
| 1 | Plymouth Argyle (C, P) | 46 | 29 | 8 | 9 | 107 | 53 | 2.019 | 66 | Promotion to the Second Division |
| 2 | Reading | 46 | 29 | 3 | 14 | 112 | 60 | 1.867 | 61 | |
| 3 | Norwich City | 46 | 26 | 9 | 11 | 89 | 50 | 1.780 | 61 | |
| 4 | Millwall | 46 | 23 | 12 | 11 | 74 | 53 | 1.396 | 58 | |
| 5 | Brighton & Hove Albion | 46 | 24 | 10 | 12 | 87 | 63 | 1.381 | 58 | |
| 6 | Newport County | 46 | 21 | 12 | 13 | 77 | 76 | 1.013 | 54 | |
| 7 | Bristol Rovers | 46 | 20 | 12 | 14 | 89 | 53 | 1.679 | 52 | |
| 8 | Northampton Town | 46 | 22 | 5 | 19 | 93 | 74 | 1.257 | 49 | |
| 9 | Southend United | 46 | 19 | 10 | 17 | 75 | 66 | 1.136 | 48 | |
| 10 | Colchester United | 46 | 17 | 12 | 17 | 56 | 77 | 0.727 | 46 | |
| 11 | Torquay United | 46 | 17 | 10 | 19 | 86 | 98 | 0.878 | 44 | |
| 12 | Aldershot | 46 | 18 | 8 | 20 | 78 | 89 | 0.876 | 44 | |
| 13 | Port Vale | 46 | 14 | 15 | 17 | 50 | 66 | 0.758 | 43 | Transferred to the Third Division North |
| 14 | Bournemouth & Boscombe Athletic | 46 | 16 | 10 | 20 | 69 | 75 | 0.920 | 42 | |
| 15 | Bristol City | 46 | 15 | 12 | 19 | 58 | 69 | 0.841 | 42 | |
| 16 | Swindon Town | 46 | 14 | 14 | 18 | 51 | 68 | 0.750 | 42 | |
| 17 | Ipswich Town | 46 | 16 | 9 | 21 | 63 | 74 | 0.851 | 41 | |
| 18 | Leyton Orient | 46 | 16 | 9 | 21 | 55 | 68 | 0.809 | 41 | |
| 19 | Crystal Palace | 46 | 15 | 9 | 22 | 61 | 80 | 0.763 | 39 | |
| 20 | Shrewsbury Town | 46 | 13 | 10 | 23 | 62 | 86 | 0.721 | 36 | |
| 21 | Watford | 46 | 13 | 10 | 23 | 57 | 81 | 0.704 | 36 | |
| 22 | Gillingham | 46 | 11 | 13 | 22 | 71 | 81 | 0.877 | 35 | |
| 23 | Exeter City | 46 | 13 | 9 | 24 | 65 | 86 | 0.756 | 35 | Re-elected |
| 24 | Walsall | 46 | 13 | 5 | 28 | 55 | 94 | 0.585 | 31 | Re-elected |

(C) Champions; (P) Promoted

=== Top goalscorers ===
First Division

- George Robledo (Newcastle United) – 33 goals

Second Division

- Derek Dooley (Sheffield Wednesday) – 46 goals

Third Division North

- Andy Graver (Lincoln City) – 36 goals

Third Division South

- Ronnie Blackman (Reading) – 39 goals
