= Tommy Walker (footballer, born 1923) =

English footballer

Personal information
- Full name: Thomas Jackson Walker
- Date of birth: 14 November 1923
- Place of birth: Cramlington, Northumberland, England
- Date of death: 13 June 2005 (aged 81)
- Place of death: Manchester, England
- Positions: Centre half; outside right

Senior career*
Years	Team	Apps	(Gls)
1941–1954	Newcastle United	184	(35)
1954–1956	Oldham Athletic	120	(19)
1956–1957	Chesterfield	14	(1)
1957–1959	Oldham Athletic	38	(4)
Total		356	(59)
- * Club domestic league appearances and goals

Thomas Jackson Walker (14 November 1923 – 13 June 2005) was an English centre-half who also played as an outside-right. He spent the first twelve years of his career playing for Newcastle United before moving to Oldham Athletic and Chesterfield. Despite his success at club level he was not selected to play for the England national team. He was often overshadowed by the big reputations of teammates such as Jackie Milburn, George Robledo and Bobby Mitchell.

== Career ==
Before Walker became a footballer he was a champion professional sprinter.

=== Newcastle United ===
He was recruited by his local club Newcastle United from Netherton Juniors in 1941, at a time when competitive football had been suspended due to World War II. However the club played in the wartime leagues and Walker was able to make 29 appearances. He also appeared as a guest player for West Ham United later in World War II. He made his Football League debut on 11 October 1946 against Coventry City. During his first season he made a total of 9 appearances. The following season he played only 8 matches, scoring 3 goals, as Newcastle won promotion into the First Division. He suffered a broken arm which kept him out of action for several months. The following season he played 22 of Newcastle's 42 matches in the top division and began to show signs of establishing himself in the first team.

He managed to gain a regular starting place in the 1949–50 season, playing as part of a forward line that also included Ernie Taylor, George Robledo, Jackie Milburn and Bobby Mitchell. He made 40 appearances for the club in both league and cup competition and scored 14 goals in those matches. The following year, Walker played in every match for the club and helped to guide them into fourth place in the First Division table. It was also during that season that Walker won his first medal by winning the FA Cup, 2–0 in the final against Blackpool.

In the 1951–52 season, the club finished in 8th place, their lowest since promotion, but Walker won a second FA Cup, 1–0 against third-placed Arsenal in the final. However he began to find his chances limited and Stan Seymour sold him to Oldham in February 1954.

=== Oldham ===
After signing for a fee of £2500, Walker went on to play 120 times for Oldham Athletic. When he left the club for £1250, many fans were aggrieved at Ted Goodier's willingness to let him leave. He later returned to the club for a second spell, playing 38 games before retiring from football in 1959.

=== Chesterfield ===
Walker moved to Chesterfield in 1957 for £1250.

== Retirement and death ==
Walker retired in 1958 after a 17-year career, at the age of 35. He decided not to go into football management and instead was in charge of a newsagents located in Middleton.

Walker died on 13 June 2005, aged 81, at a nursing home in Manchester following a short illness.

== Personal life ==
Walker married Lily and they had a son together, Thomas. He also had two grandchildren, Richard and Andrew.

== Honours ==
=== As a player ===
Newcastle United

- FA Cup: 1950–51, 1951–52
