= Jorge Robledo (disambiguation) =

Jorge Robledo (1926–1989) was a Chilean footballer.

Jorge Robledo may also refer to:

- Jorge Enrique Robledo (born 1950), Colombian architect and politician
- Jorge Robledo (conquistador) (1500–1546), Spanish conquistador
