= History of Ipswich Town F.C. =

History of an English football club

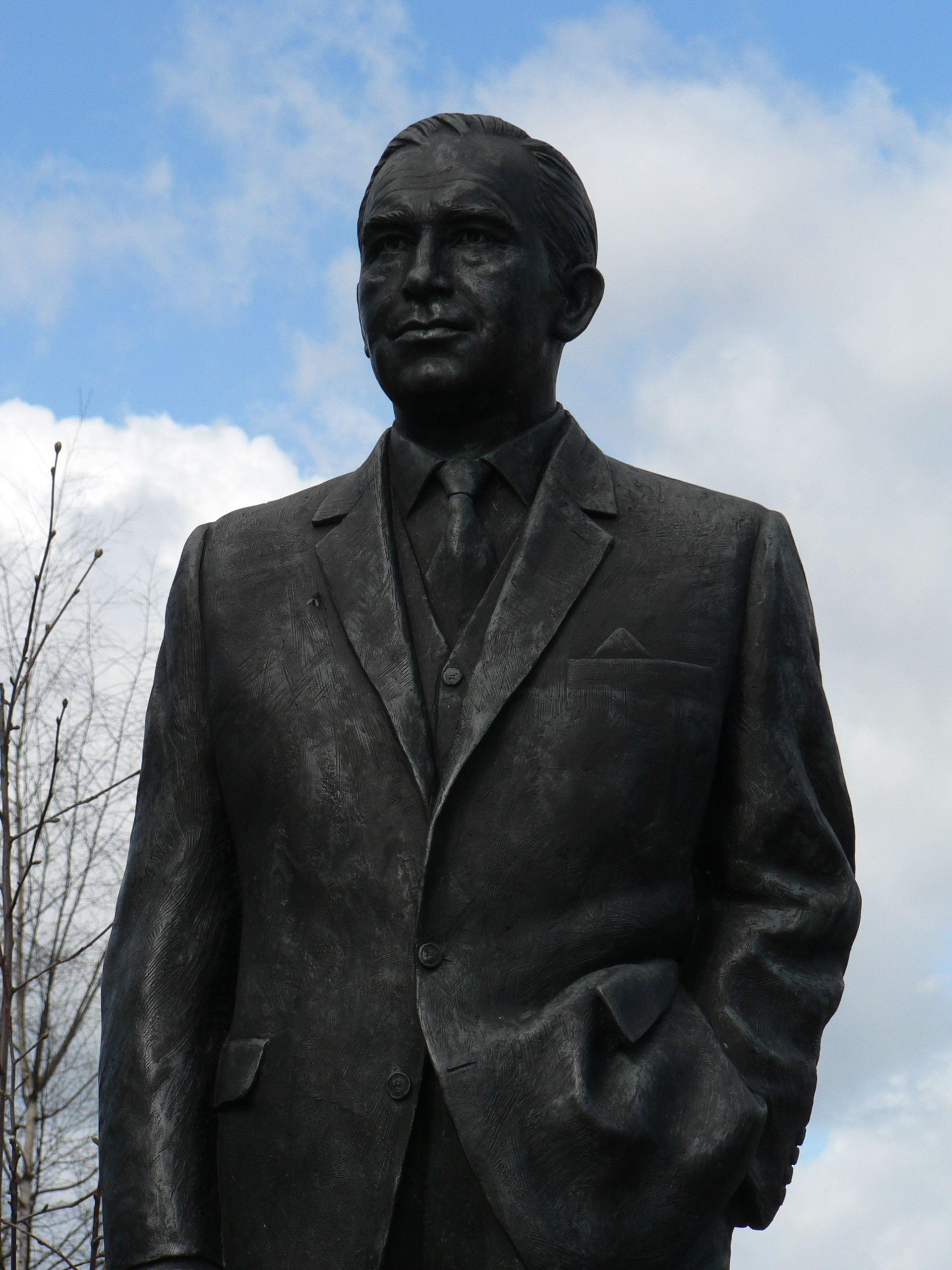
Statue of Sir Alf Ramsey at Portman Road

Ipswich Town Football Club is an English association football club based in Ipswich, Suffolk, which was formed in 1878. The side played amateur football until 1936 when the club turned professional and was elected to the Southern League. Ipswich Town were elected into the Third Division South of the Football League in place of Gillingham on 30 May 1938.

The club experienced league success during the early 1960s under the guidance of Alf Ramsey, winning the First Division title in 1961–62, one season after winning promotion from the Second Division. Two decades later, under the guidance of Bobby Robson, the club achieved success both in the FA Cup in 1978 and in European competition, winning the UEFA Cup in 1981.

Success at Ipswich for Ramsey and Robson led to both men managing the England national football team. Under Ramsey, England won the World Cup in 1966, and Robson led the team to fourth place at the 1990 World Cup.

== Foundation to professionalism: 1878–1936 ==
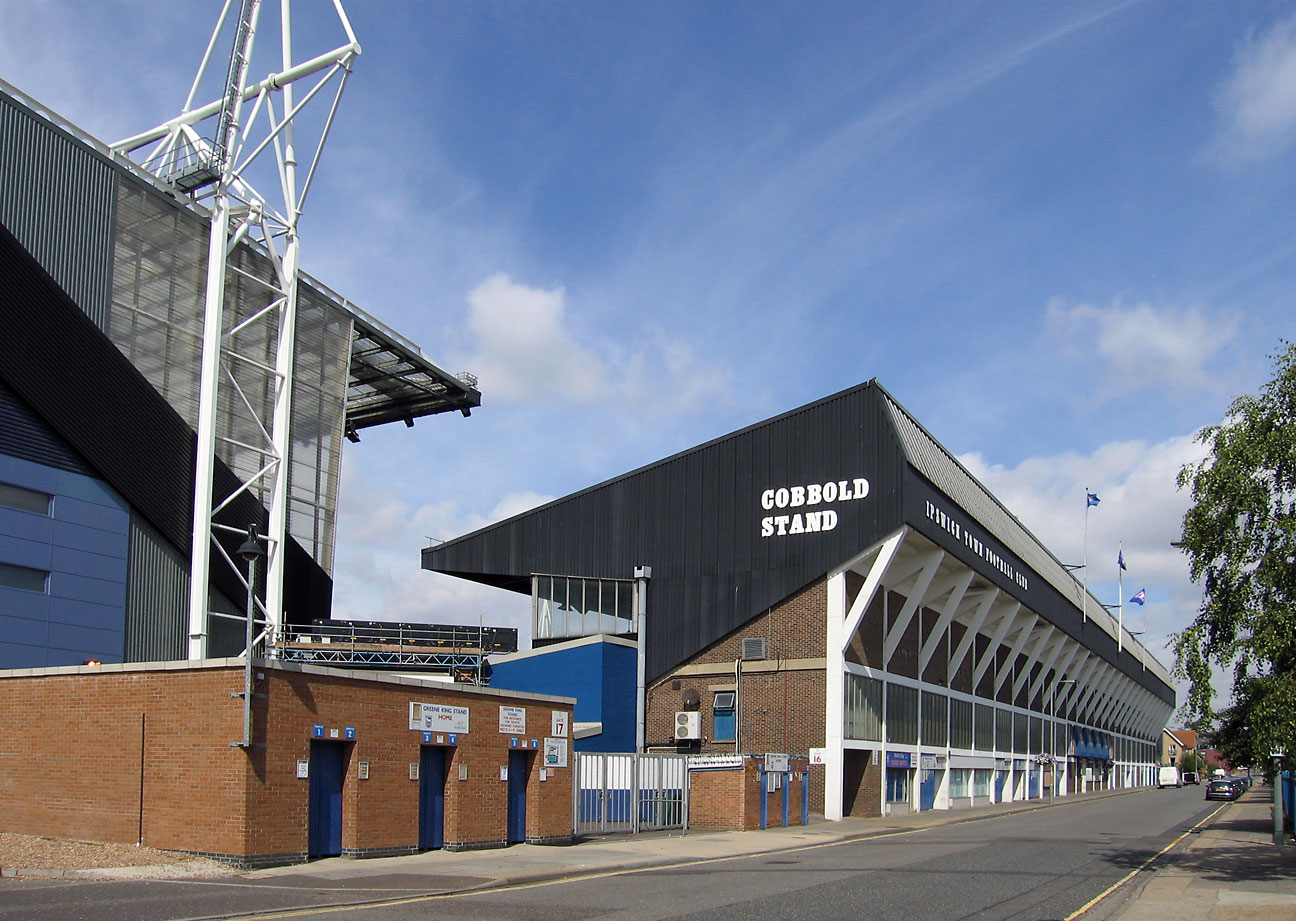
Portman Road, Ipswich's home ground since 1884

The club was founded on 16 October 1878 as an amateur side known as Ipswich AFC, under the presidency of local MP Thomas Cobbold who had played football at Charterhouse School. George S Sherrington & J. M. Franks were elected joint Captains. Ipswich AFC's first match was a 6–1 home victory over Stoke Wanderers at the Broom Hill ground on 2 November 1878. This was followed by a 2–0 victory over Harwich in the club's first away match. Losing only one game in seventeen in its second season, the club was able to build enough interest to enroll players for a second team. Ipswich recorded their biggest ever victory during the 1880–81 season, a 15–0 defeat of East Stamford with one player, John Knights, registering a treble hat trick; both achievements remain club records. The team moved to Portman Road, the current ground, in 1884, and would share, until 1936, the facilities with the East Suffolk Cricket Club who had played there since 1855. The Cobbold family involvement continued when, in 1885, Nathanael Fromanteel Cobbold was elected as a vice-president of the club. Following his sudden death the following year, the position was then held by his nephew John Dupuis Cobbold.

The club won their first trophy in the 1886–87 season, triumphing 2–1 against a team representing Ipswich School in the final of the Suffolk Challenge Cup. In 1888 the club merged with Ipswich Rugby Club to form Ipswich Town F.C. In 1890, the club entered the qualifying rounds of the FA Cup for the first time and was knocked out in the final qualifying round by the 93rd Highlanders. The club experienced scant success in the Cup during the 1890s but won a number of local cup competitions, including the Suffolk Senior Cup and the Ipswich Charity Cup. Having received invitations to join from both the Southern League and the Norfolk & Suffolk League, Ipswich joined the latter in the 1899–1900 season, finishing fourth in their first league season. They were league runners-up in 1902–03. In 1903 they also entered a team into the new South East Anglian League and were its inaugural champions. They left the South East Anglian League in 1906, but continued playing in the Norfolk & Suffolk League.

In 1907, Ipswich became founder members of the Southern Amateur League. The club narrowly avoided relegation in many of the following seasons, and suffered a club record 15–1 defeat at the hands of the Corinthians at Portman Road on New Year's Day, 1910. The outbreak of the First World War and the commandeering of Portman Road by the Army curtailed the 1914–15 season and organised football did not return until the 1920–21 season. Just one year later, Ipswich Town became champions of the Southern Amateur League, clinching the title on the last day of the season. The club won the league a further three times, in 1929–30, 1932–33 and 1933–34, before becoming founder members of the Eastern Counties Football League at the end of the 1934–35 season.

== Early Football League: 1936–1955 ==
League positions since 1938–39 season

In 1936, local businessman Leonard P. Thompson threatened to lead a breakaway from the amateur club to create an entirely separate professional club, Ipswich United. John Murray Cobbold, the club president, called together rival factions for a meeting at the Town Hall on 1 May 1936, at which it was agreed that Ipswich Town should turn professional. The club was unanimously elected to the Southern League for the 1936–37 season and former Irish international footballer Mick O'Brien was appointed as the club's first professional manager.

The club's first professional game at Portman Road resulted in a 4–1 win against Tunbridge Wells Rangers and the club went on to win the Southern League in their debut season. O'Brien left after just one season following the death of his wife. Ipswich Town were managerless until 10 November 1936 when the club appointed Scott Duncan, who had left recently relegated Manchester United. He led Ipswich to third place in the 1937–38 season.

Ipswich Town were elected to The Football League on 30 May 1938 by a margin of just two votes, at the expense of Gillingham, initially playing in the Third Division South. The club's last competitive match before the league was suspended due to the Second World War was a 1–1 draw with local rivals, Norwich City. Both John Murray Cobbold and director Robert Nevill Cobbold were killed during the war, the position of director being filled by John Cavendish Cobbold in 1948. Despite the interruption due to the war, Duncan managed the club for over 500 games between 1937 and 1955. Following three successive top-eight finishes, the 1949–50 season ended with Ipswich in 17th position in the Third Division South, the club's lowest ever league finish.

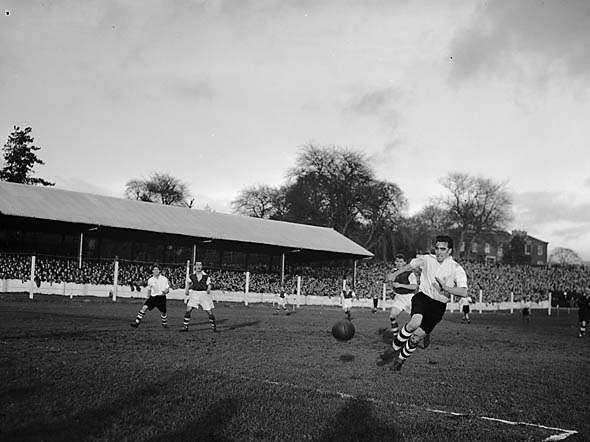
Ipswich in action at Merthyr in 1951

During the early 1950s striker Tom Garneys finished as club top-scorer for four seasons in a row, and became the first professional Ipswich player to score four times in a game. During this period, Ipswich won the title and promotion to the Second Division in the 1953–54 season, during which eight consecutive wins were recorded. The club was relegated back to the Third Division South the following year at the end of a poor season, the highlight of which was progress to the fifth round of the FA Cup, a run ended by First Division Preston North End. Duncan resigned but stayed on at the club in a secretarial role for a further three years. His replacement was a managerial novice, former England international and double Championship winner at Tottenham Hotspur, Alf Ramsey.

== Ramsey and champions of England: 1955–69 ==
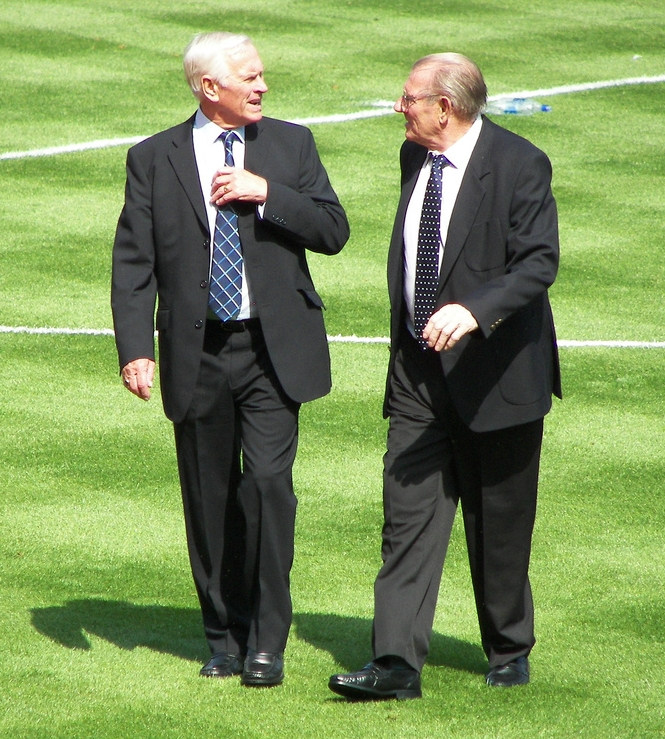
Ted Phillips (left) and former team-mate Ray Crawford at Portman Road

Alf Ramsey's appointment led Billy Wright to comment, "In appointing Alf to become their manager Ipswich Town paid a tremendous tribute to intelligent football – and footballers who think!" In Ramsey's first season at the club, Ipswich scored 106 goals in 46 games and finished third in Division Three (South). The following season, 1956–57, the club won the Third Division South title for the second time and saw the emergence of local striker Ted Phillips who scored 46 times during the season; this remains the highest number of goals scored by an Ipswich player in a season. During the same season, Ipswich played under floodlights for the first time, at Coventry City in September 1956. At the end of that season that John Cavendish Cobbold was appointed as the club's chairman. Three seasons of mid-table finishes followed as Ipswich established themselves in the Second Division, along with moderate success in the FA Cup, most notably reaching the fifth round in the 1958–59 season.

Ipswich had their most successful season to that point in 1960–61, winning the Second Division and promotion to the top level of English football, ahead of Sheffield United and Liverpool. In the top flight, Ipswich became champions of the Football League at the first attempt in 1961–62, with Ray Crawford joint English and European top scorer with Derek Kevan of West Bromwich Albion. Matt Busby described the title-winners as "... one of the First Division's most attractive sides ...". As English league champions, Ipswich qualified for European football for the first time. They met Maltese side Floriana in the European Cup, defeating them 14–1 on aggregate in the first round before losing to A.C. Milan in the second round; it would be another 11 years before the club would qualify for Europe again. Ramsey quit the club in April 1963 to take charge of the England national football team, and Ipswich finished only four places above relegation in the 1962–63 season. To commemorate Ramsey's success at the club, a statue of him was unveiled outside Portman Road in 2000 by Ray Crawford.

Ramsey was replaced by Jackie Milburn, under whose leadership fortunes on the pitch declined. Two years after winning the league title, Ipswich dropped into the Second Division in 1963–64, conceding 121 league goals in 42 games, still the highest number of goals conceded by Ipswich in a season. Patrick Mark Cobbold, John's brother, joined the board of directors in 1964 and their mother, Lady Blanche Cobbold, became honorary president of the club. Milburn quit after just one full season and was replaced by Bill McGarry early in the 1964–65 season. The club remained in the Second Division for four years until McGarry guided Ipswich to promotion in the 1967–68 season, winning the division by a single point ahead of Queens Park Rangers. McGarry left to manage Wolves and was replaced by Bobby Robson in January 1969.

== Robson and Europe: 1969–82 ==
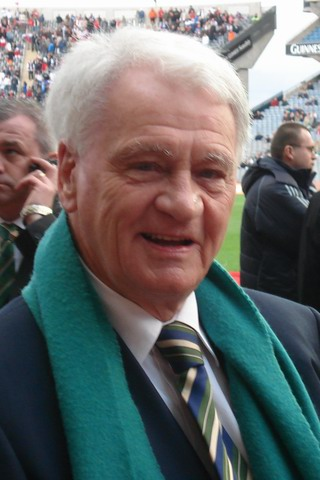
Bobby Robson guided Ipswich to success in the FA Cup and the UEFA Cup.

Bobby Robson's appointment followed a chance encounter with Ipswich director Murray Sangster while scouting at Portman Road for Chelsea manager Dave Sexton. Robson had some experience of management from his time at Fulham, although he had been sacked after failing to avoid relegation from the Second Division. Robson's sides finished 18th and 19th in his first two seasons at Ipswich, but he kept the team in the top division, before finding greater success. Robson led the club to fourth place in the First Division and success in the Texaco Cup, beating local rivals Norwich City 4–2, in the 1972–73 season.

The fourth-place finish meant Ipswich qualified for the 1973–74 UEFA Cup. In the first round, they were drawn against six-time European champions Real Madrid. Following a 1–0 victory at Portman Road, Ipswich needed to defend their slim lead. Ipswich captain Mick Mills was reported in the Spanish press suggesting that "El Real no es invincible" ("Real are not invincible") and a 0–0 draw at the Bernabéu secured Ipswich's shock passage into the second round. The club fell at the quarter-final stage but fourth place in the league enabled Ipswich to return to the tournament in the following season.

In the 1974–75 season, Ipswich finished third in the First Division and were losing semi-finalists in the FA Cup. Suffering from cancer and becoming less able to carry out his duties as chairman, John Cobbold swapped roles with director Patrick Cobbold in 1976. In the 1975–76 season Ipswich finished sixth of the league, and in October 1976, they signed Paul Mariner from Plymouth for a club record £220,000. The team challenged Liverpool for the First Division title for much of the 1976–77 season, going top of the table in February 1977 with a 5–0 defeat of Norwich City in the East Anglian derby. Mariner's efforts helped the club to a third-place finish, and the following season, he scored seven goals in the FA Cup as the club won the second major honour in its history, Roger Osborne scoring the winning goal in a 1–0 victory over Arsenal in the FA Cup Final at Wembley Stadium. The club's league fortunes dipped dramatically during the season finishing 18th, just three points above the relegation places, but the team reached the third round of the UEFA Cup, where they beat Barcelona 3–0 at Portman Road; Barcelona won the second leg 3–0, Johan Cruyff scoring twice, and Ipswich went out on penalties. The team's FA Cup success secured qualification for the 1978–79 European Cup Winners' Cup, where they reached the quarter-finals, again losing to Barcelona. Over the next two seasons Robson brought Dutchmen Arnold Mühren and Frans Thijssen to the club while the team achieved two further top six finishes in the First Division. However, it was the 1980–81 season which, in Robson's words, "... helped put Ipswich on the map ...".

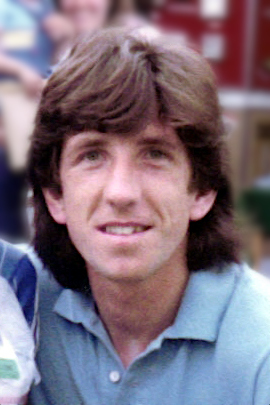
Paul Mariner, top scorer at Ipswich from 1977–78 to 1979–80

The club finished second in the league once more and were losing semi-finalists in the FA Cup, but the real success of the season was victory in the UEFA Cup. Beating Michel Platini's AS Saint-Étienne 4–1 at the Stade Geoffroy-Guichard in the quarter-finals and a 2–0 aggregate victory over 1. FC Köln in the semi-final led Ipswich to the club's first European final, played over two legs against AZ 67 Alkmaar. A 3–0 victory at Portman Road was followed by a 4–2 defeat at the Olympic Stadium in Amsterdam, resulting in a 5–4 aggregate victory over the Dutch side.

Ipswich therefore began the 1981–82 UEFA Cup campaign as holders, but lost in the first round to Scottish opponents Aberdeen. Domestically, the club had continued success, finishing second in the First Division yet again, this time four points behind Liverpool.

Robson's achievements with Ipswich earned him an offer from the Football Association to become the England national coach; he declined an offer of a ten-year contract extension from Ipswich director Patrick Cobbold. On 7 July 1982, two days after England were knocked out of the 1982 World Cup, Bobby Robson left Ipswich to succeed Ron Greenwood as coach of England. During his 13-year tenure at Ipswich, Robson brought in only 14 players from other clubs, relying instead on players developed through the club's youth programmes. In 2002, in recognition of Robson's achievements with the club, a life-size statue of him was unveiled opposite the Cobbold Stand at Portman Road. On 7 July 2006, Robson was named as honorary president of Ipswich Town Football Club, the first since Lady Blanche Cobbold who had died in 1987.

== After Robson: 1982–1995 ==
Bobby Robson was replaced at Ipswich by his chief coach, Bobby Ferguson. Ferguson made the transition from coach to manager in July 1982, but some success in the various cup competitions was offset by an end to the high league positions the club had enjoyed under Robson. In the three seasons from 1982–83 to 1984–85, Ipswich reached the FA Cup quarter-final and League Cup semi-final in 1985, but declined in the league, finishing 9th, 12th and 17th. In the following season, the team's league form was even poorer, resulting in a 20th-place finish and relegation to the Second Division. Ipswich finished fifth in the Second Division in the 1986–87 season to qualify for the play-offs, but Ferguson resigned after losing to 2–1 on aggregate to Charlton Athletic.

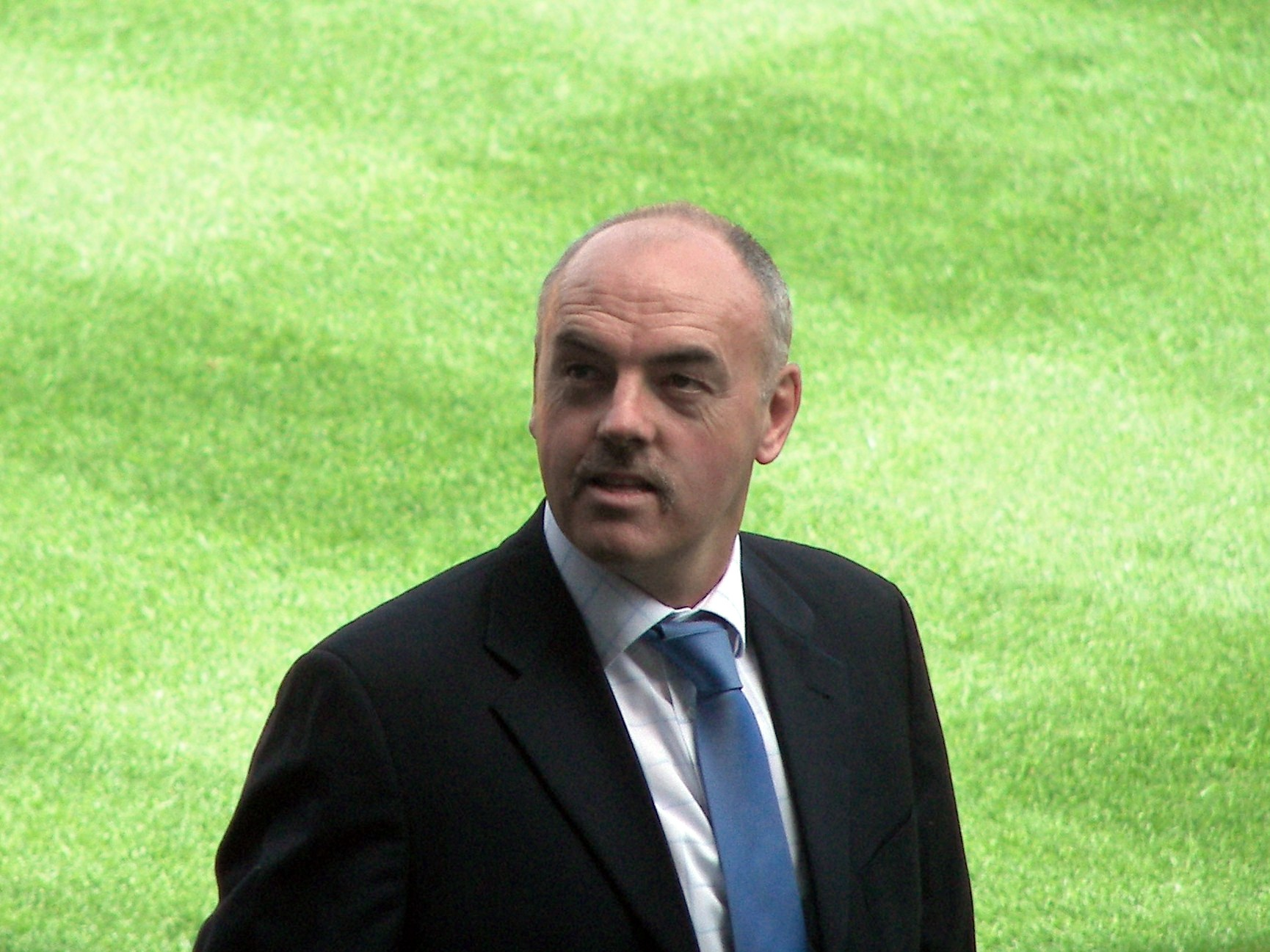
John Wark spent three periods of his career at Ipswich.

From 1987 to 1990, Ipswich Town were managed by John Duncan, but achieved only mid-table finishes each season with the club gaining a reputation as a "competent Second Division side". Duncan was sacked in June 1990 and was replaced by John Lyall, whose 14-year reign as West Ham United manager had ended the previous summer. During that time the Hammers had won the FA Cup twice and finished third in the league. Lyall guided Ipswich to a mid-table finish in the 1990–91 season but a considerable improvement the following season led to winning the Second Division championship. The team was promoted to join the inaugural season of the FA Premier League.

After a good start to the season, Ipswich were in fourth place in the league in January 1993, but a dip in form during the final weeks of the season saw the club finish 16th. The next season was almost a mirror of the previous; Ipswich again made a good start, followed by a late slump in results. The club only avoided relegation when Sheffield United suffered a last-gasp 3–2 defeat at Chelsea on the final day of the season. Lyall was sacked as Ipswich manager in December 1994 with the club at the bottom of the Premiership. His successor George Burley was unable to turn things around and Ipswich suffered a "humiliating" 9–0 defeat at Manchester United in early March, the biggest margin in a Premiership match. Relegation was confirmed soon afterwards and Ipswich ended the season having conceded 93 goals in 42 league games. Patrick Cobbold had left his role as club chairman in 1991, handing his position to John Kerr. His brother had died in 1983 and Patrick died suddenly in 1994, but the Cobbold connection continued when Patrick and John's nephew Major Philip William Hope-Cobbold joined the board in 1995.

== Europe, administration and Championship regulars: 1995–2018 ==
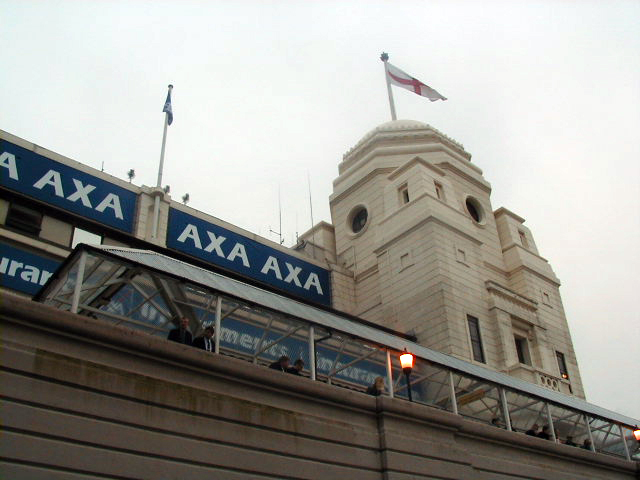
Ipswich won the First Division play-off final at Wembley Stadium in 2000.

Having served on the board of directors since 1986, David Sheepshanks was appointed as club chairman in 1995. The next four seasons brought near-misses as the club flirted with promotion; in 1995–96, Ipswich fell one place short of the First Division play-off zone, and the ensuing three seasons brought successive semi-final play-off defeats. In 2000, Ipswich qualified for the Division One play-off final, the last such match at Wembley Stadium before the stadium was to be redeveloped. They beat Barnsley 4–2 securing their return to the Premiership after an absence of five years.

Ipswich made only one major signing during the off-season, buying Hermann Hreiðarsson from Wimbledon F.C. for a club record £4m two days before the season commenced. Television pundits Rodney Marsh and Mark Lawrenson both agreed relegation would be the obvious outcome. Ipswich surprised the doubters; they sustained a high league position and narrowly missed out on qualification for the UEFA Champions League, when the team failed to win on the last day of the season against Derby County. The fifth-place finish gained the club a UEFA Cup place and earned George Burley the title of FA Premier League Manager of the Year, an award that until 2010 had, in every other season, been given to the manager of the Premier League champions.

Matteo Sereni and Finidi George arrived before the 2001–02 season to boost the squad for its foray into Europe. The club's league form was poor, and 18 games into the campaign, Ipswich were bottom of the table with just one league victory. However, there was some relief in the UEFA Cup with a victory over Inter Milan 1–0 at home in the third round, despite which the tie was lost over two legs after a 4–1 defeat at the San Siro. From bottom of the table at Christmas, a run of seven wins from eight fixtures appeared to have secured the team's league status, but another decline set in and relegation was confirmed on the final day of the season with a 5–0 defeat by Liverpool at Anfield. The loss of income due to relegation to the Championship contributed to the club going into financial administration, resulting in the sale of a number of players including Jamie Clapham, Darren Ambrose, and club captain Matt Holland. Ipswich had the consolation of again qualifying for the UEFA Cup, through UEFA's Fair Play system, losing in the second round to Czech side Slovan Liberec. A poor start to the domestic season, leaving the club 19th in the table by mid-October, resulted in George Burley being sacked after nearly eight years as manager.

First team coach Tony Mowbray was in charge for four games as caretaker manager, winning once, but he was replaced as manager by the permanent appointment of former Oldham Athletic, Everton and Manchester City manager Joe Royle, whose managerial career had previously yielded four promotions and one FA Cup victory; as a player, he had been named player of the year in his only full season at Ipswich's local rivals Norwich City.

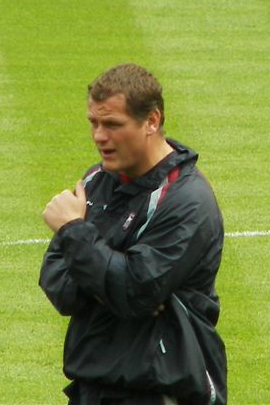
Jim Magilton played for Ipswich for seven years before spending three years as manager.

When Royle became Ipswich manager, the club was struggling near the Division One relegation zone, but the change in management sparked a revival and Ipswich narrowly failed to reach the 2002–03 play-offs. The club came out of administration during the 2003–04 season, and continued to challenge for promotion back to the Premier League. Ipswich finished that season in fifth place, but were beaten in the play-off semi finals by West Ham United 2–1 on aggregate. Ipswich missed automatic promotion in the 2004–05 season, finishing third, only two points behind second-placed Wigan Athletic. Again, they lost to West Ham United in the play off semi-finals, this time by a 4–2 aggregate score. Although they had been pre-season promotion favourites for the 2005–06 season, Ipswich finished 15th, the club's lowest finish since 1966, and Joe Royle resigned on 11 May 2006.

At a press conference held on 5 June 2006, Jim Magilton was officially named as the new manager and former academy director Bryan Klug was appointed as first team coach. In Magilton's first season, the club reached a final placing of 14th place in the table. That year, Ipswich became the first carbon neutral football club in England following a collaboration between the fans and the club's main sponsor E.ON. In October 2007, Ipswich agreed to sell a £44m stake in the club to British businessman Marcus Evans who became the majority owner and shareholder. 2007–08 brought further progress for Magilton and his side, who finished eighth in the final table. Magilton's team failed to gain promotion or reach the play-offs in the 2008–09 season, and on 22 April 2009 Magilton was sacked. His successor, Roy Keane, was appointed as manager the following day. Sheepshanks stood down as chairman after 14 years on 20 May 2009. Ipswich started the 2009–10 season winless in the league after 14 games and bottom of the Championship, their worst ever start to a league season. Limited success throughout the year saw the club finish 15th in Keane's first full season at the club. Keane's second season at the club started well but by the start of 2011, the club were 19th in the Championship, and he left the club on 7 January 2011. First team coach Ian McParland stood in as caretaker manager for two matches, including a semi-final first leg win in the League Cup against Arsenal, before Paul Jewell took the role on permanently in mid-January 2011. Ipswich finished 13th that season, and 15th the following, Jewell's first full season at the club. The longest-serving members of the Championship, Ipswich were bottom of the league by late October, and Jewell left the club by "mutual consent", leaving Chris Hutchings in a caretaker role. After a single match, Hutchings was replaced by Mick McCarthy on a full-time basis. McCarthy led Ipswich to finish in 14th position that season, and 9th in the following season. Despite losing their final match of the 2014–15 season, Ipswich finished in sixth place and secured a play-off place where they played their local rivals Norwich City, losing 4–2 on aggregate. The following season Ipswich finished just outside the playoff places, in seventh place. The 2016–17 season saw Ipswich finish 16th, their lowest finish since the 1958–59 season. On 29 March 2018, the club announced that Mick McCarthy's contract, which was due to expire at the end of the 2017–18 season, would not be extended. McCarthy announced that he was quitting during the post-match press conference following a 1–0 victory over Barnsley on 10 April 2018. He was replaced until the end of the season by Bryan Klug as a caretaker manager.

== Relegation and League One Era: 2018–2022 ==
Paul Hurst was appointed as manager for the start of the 2018–19 season, with the club heralding it as "a new era", but was sacked less than five months later after securing a single victory in fourteen league matches, leaving Ipswich bottom of the Championship. On 27 October 2018, former Norwich City manager Paul Lambert was appointed as the new manager. Winning 3 games in the next 28 resulted in Ipswich being relegated to the third tier of English football for the first time since 1957, with relegation being confirmed following a one-all draw with Birmingham City on 13 April 2019. Ipswich finished their first season in League One in eleventh, with the final standings ultimately being decided by points-per-game due to the season's suspension due to the COVID-19 pandemic. In the 2020–21 season, Ipswich continued to struggle and found themselves in tenth place in January. This prompted local newspaper East Anglian Daily Times to call for Paul Lambert to be sacked as Ipswich manager. Lambert left the club by mutual consent on 28 February 2021.

Former Wigan Athletic manager Paul Cook was appointed as replacement for Lambert and handed a contract until 2023 on 2 March 2021. On 7 April 2021, the club announced that US investment group Gamechanger 20 Limited had purchased a majority stake in the club, with previous owner Marcus Evans remaining as a minority shareholder. Ipswich ended the 2020–21 season in League One in ninth position.

Ipswich continued to stagnate into the 2021–22 season. Following a streak of poor results, Cook was sacked after 9 months in charge on 6 December 2021. It took Ipswich ten days to appoint former Manchester United assistant coach Kieran McKenna. Form considerably improved for the rest of the season, however, it was not enough for Ipswich to push for play-offs. Ipswich finished the season in 11th.

== Promotion to the Championship: 2022–present ==
Ipswich started their fourth season in League One strongly, winning seven of their first ten games, losing just one. Ipswich remained in the top two until the 25th round, where a series of draws pushed them out of the automatic promotion slots into the play-off positions. Ipswich's chances of automatic promotion appeared to fade, but Kieran McKenna managed to guide the team back into second spot with an eighteen-game unbeaten run in the close of the season. Ipswich confirmed their promotion back into the Championship with a 6–0 victory over Exeter on 29 April 2023. Overall, Ipswich scored 101 goals and gained 98 points.
