= Ray Daniel (Welsh footballer) =

Welsh footballer and manager

Personal information
- Full name: William Raymond Daniel
- Date of birth: 2 November 1928
- Place of birth: Swansea, Wales
- Date of death: 6 November 1997 (aged 69)
- Position: Centre half

Youth career
- 1944–1946: Swansea Town

Senior career*
Years	Team	Apps	(Gls)
1949–1953	Arsenal	87	(5)
1953–1957	Sunderland	136	(6)
1957–1958	Cardiff City	6	(0)
1958–1960	Swansea Town	45	(7)
1960–1967	Hereford United		

International career
1951–1957	Wales	21	(0)

Managerial career
- 1962–1963: Hereford United
- * Club domestic league appearances and goals

William Raymond Daniel (2 November 1928 – 6 November 1997) was a Welsh football player and manager.

== Career ==
Daniel was born in Swansea and started his career at his local club Swansea Town as an amateur, making his debut for the club as a full-back in a wartime fixture at the age of 15. In October 1946, he was signed by Arsenal, whom his elder brother Bobby had played for before he had been killed in the Second World War, aged 18. Due to compulsory National Service duty between 1947 and 1949, he did not make his debut for Arsenal until 7 May 1949 against Charlton Athletic, on the final day of the 1948–49 season; Arsenal won 2–0.

Daniel played at centre half but spent much of his early career at Arsenal as a reserve, as understudy to Leslie Compton, playing only 13 league matches in his first three seasons as a first-team player. Whilst still a reserve player at Arsenal, Daniel gained three caps for Wales, making his debut in a 1–1 draw against England at Roker Park on 20 October 1951. He went on to win twenty-one caps for his country.

When Compton retired in 1951, Daniel became Arsenal's regular at centre-half and played in the Gunners' FA Cup final loss at the hands of Newcastle United in 1952, despite the fact he was still recovering from a broken arm. He made up the disappointment the following season, missing only one match in Arsenal's 1952–53 First Division-winning campaign. Daniel left Arsenal for Sunderland in 1953 for £27,500, then a record fee for a defender.

Daniel spent four seasons at Sunderland, and eventually became club captain. He played 136 League games for the Rokerites, before leaving for Cardiff City in October 1957. He managed only six League games before returning to his first club Swansea, where he played 45 League games and scored seven goals.

He left for Hereford United in 1960 and was later the club's player-manager for a brief period between 1962 and 1963, before resigning to allow Bob Dennison to take over. After that, he left the game completely, and later ran a post office. He died aged 69 in 1997.

== Honours ==
Arsenal

- Football League First Division: 1952–53
- FA Cup runner-up: 1951–52
