= Allan Hunter (footballer) =

Northern Irish footballer

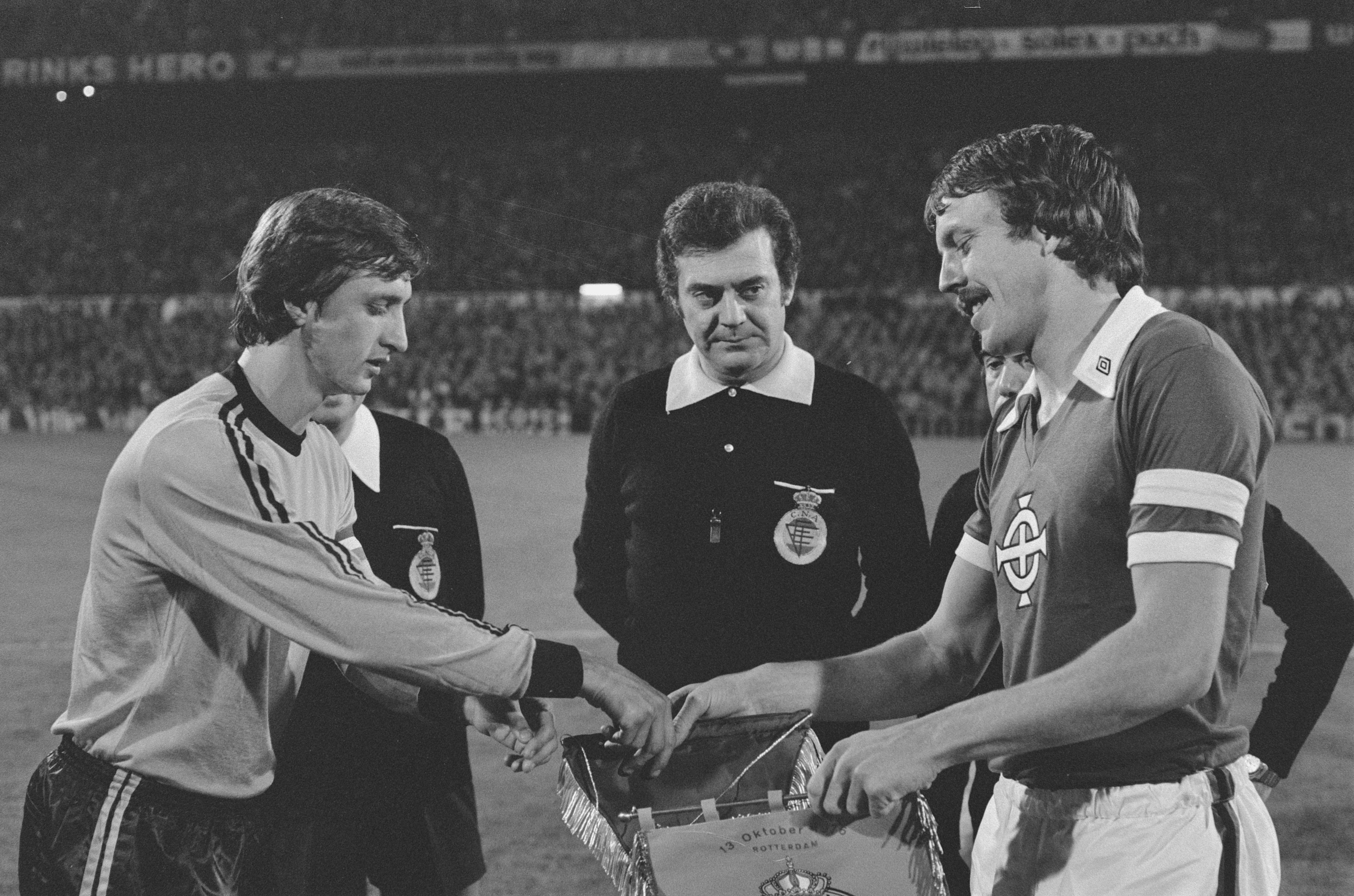
- Johan Cruijff and Allan Hunter (Rotterdam, 1976)

Personal information
- Date of birth: 30 June 1946 (age 80)
- Place of birth: Sion Mills, Northern Ireland
- Height: 6 ft 0 in (1.83 m)
- Position: Central defender

Youth career
- Coleraine

Senior career*
Years	Team	Apps	(Gls)
1962–1966	Coleraine	97	(2)
1966–1969	Oldham Athletic	83	(1)
1969–1972	Blackburn Rovers	84	(1)
1971–1982	Ipswich Town	280	(8)
1982	Colchester United	19	(0)
Total		563	(12)

International career
1969–1979	Northern Ireland	53	(1)

Managerial career
- 1982–1983: Colchester United
- * Club domestic league appearances and goals

Allan Hunter (born 30 June 1946) is a former international footballer and manager. Hunter began his career with Coleraine before playing for Oldham Athletic, Blackburn Rovers, Ipswich Town and Colchester United. He managed Colchester United for eight months, only to return for a brief period as a coach at Layer Road.

As an international, he represented his country 53 times, 47 of which while he was at Ipswich, becoming the club's most capped player in Ipswich Town's history.

== Club career ==
Hunter spent the majority of his professional career with Ipswich, making over 350 appearances in his eleven years at the club.

As a central defender, Hunter played for Coleraine (alongside his brother Victor), Oldham Athletic and Blackburn Rovers before making a £60,000 move to Ipswich Town in September 1971, in a transfer that saw Bobby Bell heading to Blackburn. Despite interest from Everton and Leeds, Hunter chose Ipswich when he met Bobby Robson – "...within five minutes I had no doubt that Ipswich was where I wanted to go." He replaced Billy Baxter who had left earlier in the year and played every game in his first season. The following year, he was paired with Kevin Beattie and they played together for many years including in the 1978 FA Cup Final in which Ipswich defeated Arsenal 1–0 at Wembley. He was named Ipswich Town Player of the Year in 1975–1976. After the FA Cup final, he only made 26 more appearances in four seasons with Terry Butcher and Russell Osman taking over at the back. He left in 1982 to become player-manager at Colchester United. Robson claimed that Hunter was his best ever signing.

Fellow Ipswich player Terry Butcher wrote of Hunter in his autobiography, describing an incident where Butcher had "crossed himself" before a reserve match:

Big Allan Hunter was sitting in the stand and after the game he grabbed me and asked me if I was a Catholic. I told him I wasn't. I was an English Protestant. Why, then, he asked, did I cross myself? I told him it was for luck but he told me to remember I was a Protestant and warned me never to do it again – if I did, he would really sort me out.

Hunter played in a full-strength Ipswich team against Stowmarket Town in a testimonial match in 1980. Ipswich won the match 15–0. His nephew, Barry, was manager of Rushden & Diamonds.

== International career ==
Hunter made 53 appearances for Northern Ireland and is Ipswich Town's most capped international player (47 appearances while at Ipswich). He was initially paired with Terry Neill. He scored his only international goal in a Euro 1976 qualifying game against Sweden in September 1975. He also played alongside such notables as Alan Ball, Colin Bell, Bobby Charlton, Bobby Moore and Emlyn Hughes for the "New European Common Market" against the "Old ECM" in a match at Wembley celebrating the admission to the European Common Market of the United Kingdom, the Republic of Ireland and Denmark in January 1973.

== Management career ==
In 1982, Hunter accepted the role of player-manager at Colchester United where he appointed former Ipswich coach Cyril Lea as his assistant. Hunter did not last long in the position, and following the suicide of John Lyons in November 1982, he resigned from the club, leaving Lea in charge.

== After retirement ==
Like many other ex-Ipswich players, Hunter settled in Suffolk following his retirement from the game.

In 2009, Hunter was inaugurated into the Ipswich Town Hall of Fame, along with George Burley, Arnold Muhren and Billy Baxter.

== Managerial statistics ==
Team	Nat	From	To	Record				
Team	Nat	From	To	P	W	D	L	Win %
Colchester United	(England)	5 May 1982	18 January 1983	36	17	7	12	47.2

== Honours ==
Ipswich Town

- FA Cup: 1977–78

Individual

- Ipswich Town Player of the Year: 1975–76
- Ipswich Town Hall of Fame: Inducted 2009
