= Wilf Taylor =

Chairman of Newcastle United F.C.

Wilfred B. Taylor was a company director who served as chairman of Newcastle United F.C. from 1953 to 1957.

== Career ==
Taylor was a specialist in seeking new talent for the club. In 1943, he attended a match between the Air Training Corps team of Northumberland and Yorkshire at Redheugh Park. Impressed at what he saw, he invited a 19-year-old Jackie Milburn, and some of his teammates, back to St James' Park: Newcastle's manager, Stan Seymour, had Milburn signed as player within a few days. Taylor went on the negotiate the transfer of Len Shackleton to Newcastle for a £13,000 fee in 1946.

Taylor became chairman of Newcastle United F.C. in 1953 but stood down after four years in summer 1957. He remained on the board of the club and reverted to his old role of seeking new talent: he secured the transfer to Newcastle of Stan Anderson for £35,000 in November 1963, the transfer of Kit Napier to Newcastle for £18,000 in November 1965 and also persuaded the Danish player, Preben Arentoft, to sign a contract with Newcastle in March 1969.

In 1963, Taylor was one of the directors who received a writ from the Newcastle player, George Eastham, on the basis that, as was typical of the retain and transfer system operating at the time, the club was refusing to allow him to transfer and this was an unfair restraint of trade. The resulting court case, at which Taylor was the lead witness for the company, led to reform of the transfer market.

Taylor became a member of the Football League Management Committee in 1964; he went to be a vice-president of the English Football League and served in that role until 1970.
