= 1958–59 Irish League =

Irish League
- Season: 1958–59
- Champions: Linfield; 24th Irish title
- Matches played: 132
- Goals scored: 574 (4.35 per match)
- Top goalscorer: Jackie Milburn (26 goals)

Location of teams in the Irish League from 1949–1972
Location of Belfast-based teams in the Irish League from 1949–1971

The 1958–59 Irish League was the 58th edition of the Irish League, the highest level of league competition in Northern Irish football. The league comprised 12 teams, and Linfield won the championship.

== League standings ==
Pos	Team	Pld	W	D	L	GF	GA	GR	Pts	Qualification
1	Linfield (C)	22	17	0	5	69	27	2.556	34	Qualification for the European Cup preliminary round
2	Glenavon	22	14	3	5	66	32	2.063	31	
3	Glentoran	22	11	5	6	56	41	1.366	27	
4	Portadown	22	12	2	8	60	35	1.714	26	
5	Ballymena United	22	12	2	8	51	46	1.109	26	
6	Crusaders	22	10	5	7	46	40	1.150	25	
7	Ards	22	10	3	9	53	51	1.039	23	
8	Coleraine	22	9	4	9	47	45	1.044	22	
9	Distillery	22	5	7	10	49	63	0.778	17	
10	Bangor	22	6	2	14	30	47	0.638	14	
11	Derry City	22	6	2	14	27	55	0.491	14	
12	Cliftonville	22	2	1	19	20	92	0.217	5	

Source: rsssf.com
(C) Champions

== Results ==
Home \ Away	ARD	BAN	BLM	CLI	COL	CRU	DIS	DER	GLV	GLT	LIN	POR
Ards		1–0	1–4	7–0	5–3	1–2	3–5	3–1	2–3	2–3	0–3	1–0
Bangor	2–3		0–2	1–0	5–0	0–3	1–1	3–0	0–2	3–2	2–3	4–3
Ballymena United	3–3	2–0		5–0	4–2	4–1	4–2	2–3	0–0	2–3	2–1	1–3
Cliftonville	1–5	2–4	4–1		0–3	1–3	3–1	0–3	2–5	0–2	0–4	1–8
Coleraine	1–2	3–3	4–0	6–1		4–0	2–2	2–0	2–1	1–1	4–0	1–2
Crusaders	5–1	3–0	0–2	3–0	0–1		4–4	2–5	2–3	2–1	3–2	3–1
Distillery	1–1	2–0	3–4	5–1	4–4	2–2		3–1	1–2	2–6	2–3	0–3
Derry City	0–6	1–0	1–4	1–1	0–1	2–1	1–3		1–6	0–4	1–4	2–1
Glenavon	2–3	2–1	3–1	6–0	3–0	1–1	7–0	2–2		7–1	3–6	2–3
Glentoran	1–1	3–1	4–0	8–3	3–2	3–3	3–3	2–0	1–2		2–1	0–1
Linfield	5–1	4–0	5–0	9–0	3–1	1–2	3–0	2–0	2–0	4–2		1–0
Portadown	6–1	5–0	3–4	2–0	6–0	1–1	5–3	3–2	1–4	1–1	2–3	

Source: Irish League Archive
Legend: Blue = home team win; Yellow = draw; Red = away team win.
