= 1952 FA Cup final =

- Event: 1951–52 FA Cup
| Newcastle United | Arsenal |
| 1 | 0 |
- Date: 3 May 1952
- Venue: Wembley Stadium, London
- Referee: Arthur Ellis (Halifax)
- Attendance: 100,000

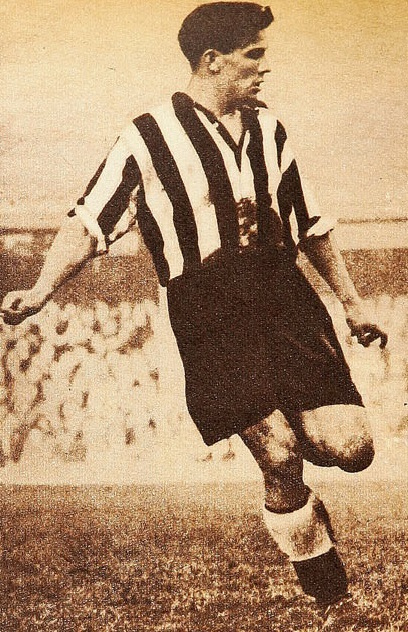
George Robledo (pictured October 1952) scored the only goal

The 1952 FA Cup final was the final match of the 1951–52 staging of the Football Association Challenge Cup (better known as the FA Cup), English football's main cup competition. The match was contested by Newcastle United and Arsenal at Wembley Stadium in London on 3 May 1952. Newcastle, who were the defending champions, won the match 1–0.

The match was only the second time that an FA Cup Final was played in May, with the 1937 final being the first. Newcastle appeared in their 11th final in total and their second successive final, whilst it was Arsenal's sixth final and their second in three years.

== Match facts ==
3 May 1952

| Newcastle United | 1–0 | Arsenal |
|---|---|---|
| G. Robledo 84' | (Report) |

Wembley Stadium, London
Attendance: 100,000
Referee: Arthur Ellis

| Newcastle | Arsenal |

| GK | 1 | (Scotland) Ronnie Simpson |
| RB | 2 | (England) Bobby Cowell |
| LB | 3 | (Northern Ireland) Alf McMichael |
| RH | 4 | (England) Joe Harvey (c) |
| CH | 5 | (Scotland) Frank Brennan |
| LH | 6 | (Chile) Ted Robledo |
| OR | 7 | (England) Tommy Walker |
| IR | 8 | (Wales) Billy Foulkes |
| CF | 9 | (England) Jackie Milburn |
| IL | 10 | (Chile) George Robledo |
| OL | 11 | (Scotland) Bobby Mitchell |
Manager:
(England) Stan Seymour

| GK | 1 | (England) George Swindin |
| RB | 2 | (Wales) Walley Barnes |
| LB | 3 | (England) Lionel Smith |
| RH | 4 | (Scotland) Alex Forbes |
| CH | 5 | (Wales) Ray Daniel |
| LH | 6 | (England) Joe Mercer (c) |
| OR | 7 | (England) Freddie Cox |
| IR | 8 | (Scotland) Jimmy Logie |
| CF | 9 | (England) Cliff Holton |
| IL | 10 | (England) Doug Lishman |
| OL | 11 | (England) Don Roper |
Manager:
(England) Tom Whittaker

== Match summary ==
Arsenal played the match with several players recovering from injuries who were rushed back into the side. After 35 minutes Walley Barnes, the team's right-back, was taken off injured with a twisted knee. At the time no substitutes were allowed, and ten-man Arsenal suffered further injuries to Cliff Holton, Don Roper and Ray Daniel, so that by the end of the match they had only seven fit players on the pitch. With the numerical advantage in their favour Newcastle won 1–0 with a goal from George Robledo. The goal was drawn by a young John Lennon, who included it in the artwork of his album Walls and Bridges in 1974.

== Broadcasting ==
Despite late efforts to overturn the decision by a minority of its members, The FA Council banned the BBC from televising the game, leaving those who could not attend with only updates on the first half available on BBC radio before the second half was described live to listeners. This remains the last cup final not to be broadcast live on television, although the game was filmed by newsreel for showing that evening in cinemas. The BBC instead broadcast a cricket match between Worcestershire and the touring Indians.

== In culture ==
John Lennon included some of his childhood drawings on the cover of his 1974 album Walls and Bridges, including one of the winning goal in the 1952 Cup final.
