= Frank Brennan (footballer) =

Scottish footballer (1924–1997)

Personal information
- Full name: Francis Brennan
- Date of birth: 23 April 1924
- Place of birth: Annathill, Scotland
- Date of death: 5 March 1997 (aged 72)
- Place of death: Newcastle upon Tyne, England
- Position: Centre half

Senior career*
Years	Team	Apps	(Gls)
1941–1946	Airdrieonians	0	(0)
1946–1956	Newcastle United	318	(3)
Total		318	(3)

International career
1946–1954	Scotland	8	(0)

Managerial career
- 1956–1962: North Shields
- 1967–1971: North Shields
- 1971–1972: Darlington
- * Club domestic league appearances and goals

Francis Brennan (23 April 1924 – 5 March 1997) was a Scottish footballer who played as a centre half.

Brennan moved to Newcastle United from Airdrieonians for £7,500 in 1946. He made his debut for the club against Millwall in August 1946 and appeared on 351 occasions for the Magpies between 1946 and 1956.

Brennan moved into management after his playing retirement, initially with North Shields between 1956 and 1962, then in Singapore and Trinidad. He returned to North Shields in 1967 and helped them to victory in the 1969 FA Amateur Cup. He was appointed manager of Darlington in August 1971 but stayed in the post for only three months before joining South Shields in a coaching role in 1972.

== Career statistics ==
Appearances and goals by club, season and competition
Club	Season	League			FA Cup		Other^{[A]}		Total	
Club	Season	Division	Apps	Goals	Apps	Goals	Apps	Goals	Apps	Goals
Newcastle United	1946–47	Second Division	31	0	5	0	0	0	36	0
Newcastle United	1947–48	Second Division	42	0	1	0	0	0	43	0
Newcastle United	1948–49	First Division	41	0	1	0	0	0	42	0
Newcastle United	1949–50	First Division	41	0	2	0	0	0	43	0
Newcastle United	1950–51	First Division	32	1	6	0	0	0	38	1
Newcastle United	1951–52	First Division	38	1	7	0	1	0	46	1
Newcastle United	1952–53	First Division	38	1	2	0	0	0	40	1
Newcastle United	1953–54	First Division	39	0	5	0	2	0	46	0
Newcastle United	1954–55	First Division	6	0	0	0	0	0	6	0
Newcastle United	1955–56	First Division	10	0	0	0	1	0	11	0
Career total			318	3	29	0	4	0	351	3

A. The "Other" column constitutes appearances and goals in the Charity Shield and Coronation Cup.

== Managerial statistics ==
Team	From	To	Record				
Team	From	To	G	W	L	D	Win %
North Shields	1956	1962					
North Shields	1967	1971					
Darlington	August 1971	January 1972	20	5	9	6	25.0

== Honours ==
=== As a player ===
Newcastle United

- FA Cup: 1950–51, 1951–52

=== As a manager ===
North Shields

- FA Amateur Cup: 1969
- FA Amateur European Cup: 1969
