= Ted Robledo =

Chilean footballer (1928–1970)

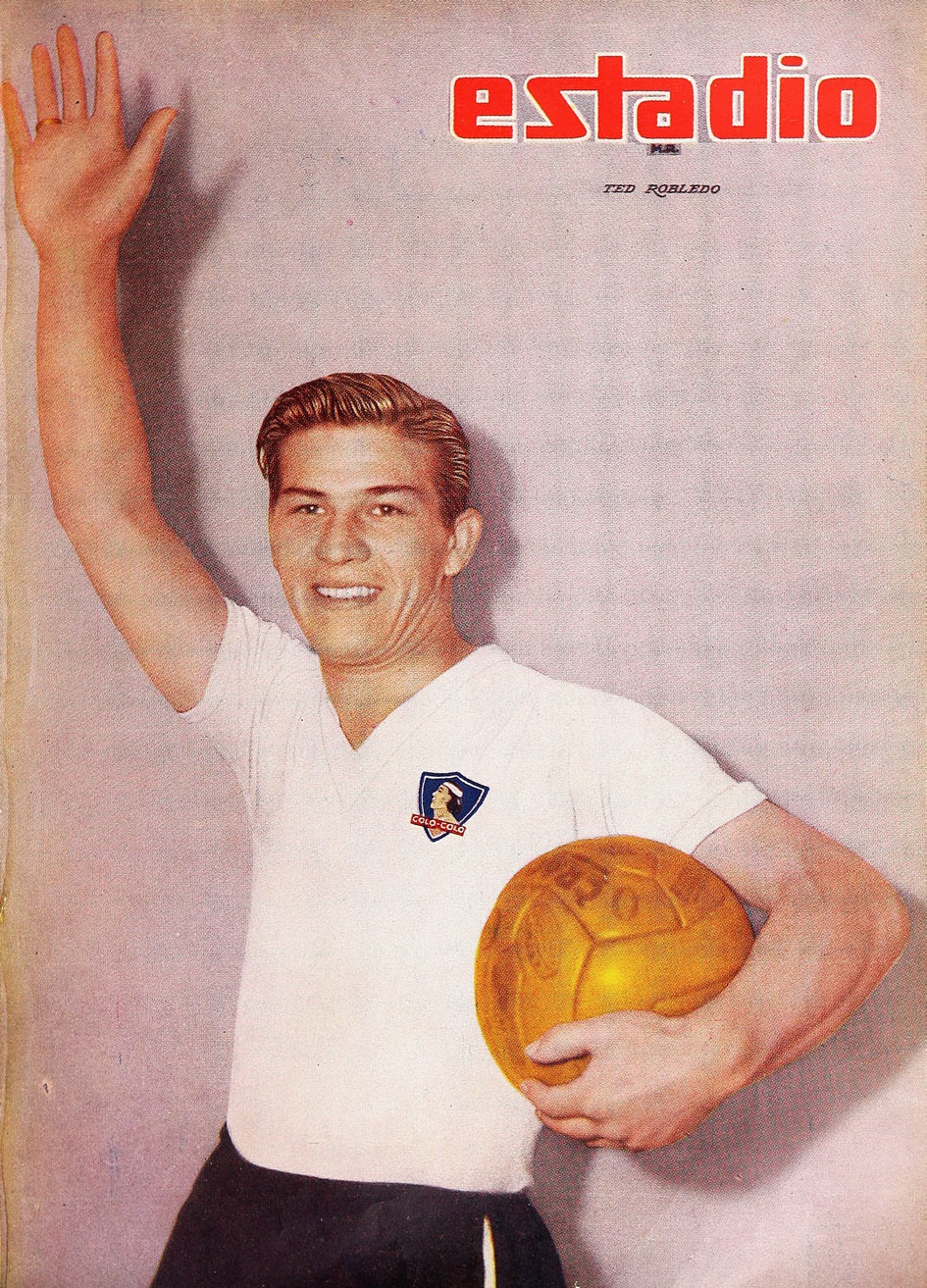
- Robledo in a 1953 photo

Personal information
- Full name: Edward Oliver Robledo
- Date of birth: 26 July 1928
- Place of birth: Iquique, Chile
- Date of death: 6 December 1970 (aged 42)
- Place of death: Persian Gulf
- Position: Wing half

Senior career*
Years	Team	Apps	(Gls)
1947–1949	Barnsley	5	(0)
1949–1953	Newcastle United	37	(0)
1953–1957	Colo-Colo		
1957	Notts County	2	(0)

International career
1954–1955	Chile	9	(0)
- * Club domestic league appearances and goals

Edward "Ted" Oliver Robledo (26 July 1928 – 6 December 1970) was a Chilean professional football player. He played as a left-sided defender, and is most notable for his time spent with Newcastle United. He was also part of Chile's squad for the 1955 South American Championship.

== Career ==
Robledo was born in Iquique, Chile to a Chilean father and an English mother. He emigrated with his family to Wath-on-Dearne, Yorkshire in 1932, at the age of four, due to the political instability in Chile at the time. The family lived at Barnsley Rd, West Melton, in the same house where the Anglo-French biographer David Bret was later raised.

Robledo started his footballing career at Barnsley with his brother George. First Division Newcastle United signed him on 27 January 1949. Newcastle were only interested in signing his brother, but neither of the Robledo brothers would move without the other. Their appearance together in the 1952 FA Cup Final was the first time more than one foreign player had appeared in a cup final team.

The majority of Robledo's appearances for the club came in the 1951–52 season. He played for Newcastle until the end of the 1952–53 season, when he was sold to Colo-Colo. He returned to England in 1957 for a brief spell with Notts County, making two appearances.

At international level, he earned nine caps for Chile national team between 1954 and 1955. After retiring from football, he served on an oil tanker where he died in mysterious circumstances in December 1970, at the age of 42. It was rumoured that he was thrown off the tanker and drowned. His body has never been found. His brother George outlived him by nearly two decades, dying in April 1989 just before his 63rd birthday.

== Honours ==
Newcastle United

- FA Cup: 1951–52
