= Arthur Willis (footballer) =

English footballer

Personal information
- Full name: Arthur Willis
- Date of birth: 2 February 1920
- Place of birth: Denaby, Conisbrough, England
- Date of death: 7 November 1987 (aged 67)
- Place of death: Haverfordwest, Wales
- Height: 5 ft 7 in (1.70 m)
- Position: Full back

Senior career*
Years	Team	Apps	(Gls)
1946–1954	Tottenham Hotspur	144	(1)
1954–1957	Swansea City	98	(0)
1957–?	Haverfordwest County		

International career
1951	England	1	(0)
- * Club domestic league appearances and goals

Arthur Willis (2 February 1920 – 7 November 1987) was a professional footballer who played for Tottenham Hotspur, Swansea City, Haverfordwest and England.

== Football career ==
Willis joined Spurs from Finchley F.C. in January 1944. He was a principal player in the push and run Championship winning side of 1950–51 when he featured in 39 games. Playing a total of 160 times and scoring one goal in all competitions for the club between 1946 and 1954 in the position of full back. Willis left Spurs in September 1954 in a transfer deal which took him to Swansea Town where he went on to make 96 appearances. He finished his career as player–manager for Haverfordwest County.

== England career ==
Willis played once for the national team in 1951 against France.

== Honours ==
Tottenham Hotspur

- Football League First Division: 1950–51
- Football League Second Division: 1949–50
