= Jackie Milburn =

English footballer (1924–1988)

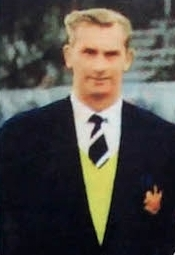
- Milburn as Linfield player-manager, 1957

Personal information
- Full name: John Edward Thompson Milburn
- Date of birth: 11 May 1924
- Place of birth: Ashington, Northumberland, England
- Date of death: 9 October 1988 (aged 64)
- Place of death: Ashington, Northumberland, England
- Position: Centre forward

Senior career*
Years	Team	Apps	(Gls)
1943–1957	Newcastle United	353	(177)
1957–1960	Linfield	54	(68)
1960–1962	Yiewsley		
Total		407	(245)

International career
1948–1955	England	13	(10)

Managerial career
- 1957–1960: Linfield
- 1960–1962: Yiewsley
- 1963–1964: Ipswich Town
- * Club domestic league appearances and goals

John Edward Thompson "Jackie" Milburn (11 May 1924 – 9 October 1988) was an English football player principally associated with Newcastle United and England, though he also spent four seasons at Linfield. He was also known as Wor Jackie (particularly in North East England, a Geordie dialectal, pronounced like "wor", meaning "our", as in "Our Jackie").

Cousin to the mother of Jack and Bobby Charlton, Milburn played two trial matches at St James' Park as a 19-year-old in 1943. In the second of these, he scored six second half goals. Milburn made his competitive debut in the FA Cup in the 1945–46 season and was initially deployed on the left wing as a supplier to Charlie Wayman. However, Wayman was dropped before a 4–0 defeat to eventual winners Charlton Athletic in a 1947 FA Cup semi-final and when he afterwards vowed not to play for United again, manager George Martin made the decision to switch Milburn to centre forward. In his next match, on 18 October 1947, Milburn wore the number nine shirt for the first time and scored a hat-trick.

Milburn's subsequent achievements, particularly his two goals which won the 1951 FA Cup Final and his 45-second opener in the 1955 FA Cup Final which was the fastest ever Wembley FA Cup Final goal until it was beaten by Roberto Di Matteo in 1997, brought him national recognition and afforded him iconic status on Tyneside. In total, Milburn played in three FA Cup winning finals for United; 1951, 1952 and 1955. Despite his achievements, Milburn was reportedly a very shy and self-deprecating individual, whose modesty further endeared him to Newcastle United supporters, though according to Tom Finney, this stemmed from an "innate inferiority complex".

By the time Milburn left Newcastle in 1957, he had become the highest goalscorer in Newcastle United's history. He remained so until he was surpassed by Alan Shearer in February 2006. Milburn remains Newcastle's second highest goalscorer, having scored 200 competitive goals. Milburn's transfer to Linfield in 1957 was almost jeopardised when the Newcastle board demanded a substantial signing fee, and much to the anger of fans, Milburn was not immediately granted a testimonial. His signing for Linfield "added thousands to the gate" and he made 54 appearances, scoring 68 goals in four seasons in all competitions for the club. He was finally granted a testimonial ten years later, in 1967.

Milburn died of lung cancer on 9 October 1988, aged 64. His funeral took place on 13 October, and was attended by over 1,000 mourners at St Nicholas's Cathedral in Newcastle. Tens of thousands of people lined the streets to watch the cortège pass. A statue of Milburn, costing £35,000 and paid for by donations received from Newcastle United supporters was erected on Newcastle's Northumberland Street before it was relocated in 1999 to St James' Boulevard and then moved again to its present position on Strawberry Place, just outside St James' Park.

Milburn was inducted into the English Football Hall of Fame in October 2006. In 2009, Goal.com listed Milburn as 43rd in their list of the top English players of all time.

== Early life ==
Milburn was born on 11 May 1924 in the upstairs flat of his grandparents' house at 14 Sixth Row in Ashington to Annie ("Nance") Thompson and Alexander ("Alec") Milburn. Alexander Milburn was the uncle of four professional footballing brothers - Jack Milburn (born 1908; played for Leeds United and Bradford City), George Milburn (born 1910; played for Leeds United and Chesterfield), Jimmy Milburn (born 1919; played for Leeds United and Bradford City), and Stan Milburn (born 1926; played for Chesterfield, Leicester City and Rochdale), who were brothers of Jack and Bobby Charlton's mother Elizabeth "Cissie" Milburn (born 1912).

Alexander Milburn worked as a coal cutter at the nearby colliery. Jackie Milburn later told his son, Jack Jr., that "I used to shiver as he disappeared into that deep shaft leading to the coalface". When he was eight years old, Milburn was given his first pair of football boots as a Christmas present from his parents and from that point "football dominated his life". The young Milburn idolised Joe Hulme, and hoped to emulate him. Although an initially confident boy, Milburn recalled an incident where, having already won the sprint, sprint relay, long jump and high jump at his school sports day, his father arrived just in time to see him win the 440 yard race. Exhausted, he collapsed to the floor – a gesture his father mistook for showboating and resulted in him receiving "a real hiding". Reflecting later, Milburn contended that "maybe my father's intentions were the best in the world...but that thrashing laid the foundations for an inferiority complex I've fought all my life to overcome". When he was twelve, Milburn moved to Hirst East Senior Boys School and was selected to play right-wing for the school football team. His father promised to award him a penny for every goal he scored. He duly earned two pence for scoring twice on his debut in a 6–4 win against Linton School. He was selected for East Northumberland Schools, and he scored in a 3–2 semi-final defeat by Lancashire at Maine Road.

Milburn left school at fourteen and, telling his father that he was too claustrophobic to follow him into coal-mining, he found employment stacking shelves and filling sugar bags on eight-shillings a week, after an abortive spell as a pantry boy in London. In 1939, he attempted to join the Royal Navy but was rejected for being an inch too short. Milburn joined the Ashington Air Training Corps instead. At sixteen, Milburn accepted an apprenticeship as a fitter at a local colliery. This meant that he was not conscripted during the war as 'fitter' was a reserved occupation.

Milburn, along with his old schoolfriend Ronnie Coulson, began entering local sprint races to earn money, clocking a 9.7 second personal best for the 100 yard dash. In 1940, he entered the Powderhall Sprint and won his first race. Milburn was then instructed to run poorly in the semi-final so to artificially conflate his handicap in the 1941 renewal, where his odds would be higher and he would be better prepared. Milburn duly came last, allegedly with a dozen pennies weighing down his left running shoe, causing him to "run like a lop-sided whippet with three legs". Milburn continued to play football for the Air Training Corps and, told one afternoon that a scout from Newcastle United was in attendance, he duly scored five in an 8–3 win. When he was told afterwards that the promised scout had failed to arrive, Milburn described it as "a bitter pill to swallow".

== Playing career ==
=== Newcastle United ===
==== Trial and signing ====
Milburn and his Northumberland ATC teammates were invited to St James' Park by Newcastle United director Wilf Taylor, after a match against Yorkshire ATC in 1943. Milburn, along with his friend and teammate Raymond Poxton, attended United's final home game of the season. Milburn was distinctly unimpressed with what he saw, turning to his friend and saying "Raymond, we could play better than this, surely?" Soon after, he responded to an advertisement for trialists published in the North Mail Newspaper by Newcastle United prior to the 1943–44 season. The first trial was held in midweek and Milburn scored two goals in one half, earning an invitation to return on Saturday for a public trial at St James' and an 'amateur contract'. He arrived long before the 2pm kick-off with a pair of borrowed football boots wrapped in brown paper, and his lunch – two pies and a bottle of pop. Milburn's team of fellow trialists ('The Stripes') played against a Newcastle United First XI featuring Albert Stubbins and Jimmy Gordon ('The Blues'). The Stripes trailed 3–0 at half time and Joe Richardson told Milburn: "you'd better buck your ideas up son, if you want to come here". Switched to centre forward in the second half, Milburn scored six times as his side won 9–3. The Sunday Sun reported that "United's second trial proved a triumph for Milburn, the Ashington inside-left, who was signed as an amateur earlier in the week. Milburn, a tall youth, showed a capacity for opportunism. Twice Milburn scored two goals within a minute".

Newcastle's manager, Stan Seymour, was sufficiently impressed by Milburn's performance that, according to author Mike Kirkup, he "asked him to sign on the spot". Milburn, now 19, had been told by his father not to sign anything until he had first shown it to him and so he refused, instead promising to return in due course with a signed professional contract once his father had approved it. Seymour, apparently concerned that news of Miburn's trial performance might alert other clubs, decided not to wait and on the Sunday following the trial he arrived, unannounced, on the Milburns' doorstep in Ashington. Seymour patiently put his case to Milburn's father, Alec, explaining that he would be taken on part-time because of his continuing pit work, on thirty shillings a week, plus two shillings and sixpence a game "for his tea", and the same amount again for his bus fare to and from the ground. At this point, as Milburn Sr. was considering the terms, Seymour reportedly began rubbing two five pound notes together behind his back. The rustling caught Alec's attention and persuaded him to allow Jackie to sign. Seymour, elated, invited everyone to the West End Club for a celebratory drink, later exclaiming that "I had secured my finest ever signing for ten quid and a couple of rounds of Newcastle Brown Ale". Milburn's official registration as a Newcastle United player came on 23 August 1938.

==== Debut and wartime football ====
In 1943, Newcastle were participants in the Northern First Championship as the Football League had been suspended due to the outbreak of the Second World War. Milburn attended his first training session the day after his signing, and immediately impressed his new teammates by out-sprinting Albert Stubbins in a 100-yard dash. Milburn joined the playing squad for United's next match against Bradford City at Valley Parade on 28 August 1943. Seymour invited Milburn's father to accompany him and Jackie recalled later that this was "to give me confidence on such a momentous day". Milburn started at inside-forward in the number 10 shirt and later recalled that this was "the most memorable moment of my career, even those Wembley victories can't match it. To pull on the black and white jersey for the first time was something special". Milburn and United were beaten 2–1, with a nervous Milburn heading wide of an open goal in the early moments. The Bradford goals were both scored by half-back Joe Harvey. Milburn, disappointed to have made little impact, was consoled afterwards by Seymour, who assured him "you'll be in the side next week". A return fixture was played against Bradford City at St James' Park on 4 September 1943 and Milburn scored his first ever goal for United – with a left-footed strike inside the opening two minutes of a 3–2 win. It was Milburn's first touch of the match. Milburn later recalled that "the Sunday papers said it was an excellent goal but...I saw the ball in a cluster of players and dashed up and belted it". Milburn continued to combine his football career with his work at the colliery. As author Roger Hutchinson later explained: "None of those wartime footballers could be counted as full-time professionals during the war". By the turn of 1943 he had almost completed his apprenticeship at the colliery and was transferred to Woodhorn Colliery. Milburn used to combine his work at Woodhorn with training on two or occasionally three evenings a week, and there were some instances where Milburn would work a double shift on a Friday, so he would be free to play for United on the following Saturday.

As a player, Milburn continued to develop; football historian Paul Joannou described him as "a raw talent who learned the rudiments of professional football rapidly". Milburn continued to initially play as an inside forward, on either the left or right flank. In the season 1944–45 United finished 35th of 54 teams in the Wartime League. It was in that season that, due to a player shortage, Milburn made two guest appearances for Newcastle's local rivals Sunderland. Milburn failed to score in either game. Milburn also made guest appearances for Sheffield United during the season. For the 1945–46 season Milburn was moved to the right-wing to accommodate new signing Charlie Wayman. Milburn publicly declared that he had no qualms with his move, stating that "I must make it quite clear that for the thirty shillings I receive per match...I consider Newcastle have the right to play me in any position". Alongside the form of Albert Stubbins, the move lead to a marked increase in United's goalscoring potency; in their first game together, Milburn and Wayman combined to help Newcastle beat Middlesbrough 8–2 and other wins included beating Bradford City 11–0 and a 9–1 win over Stoke City at St James' Park Milburn's natural pace was well-suited to his new position – The Journal's sports correspondent Ken McKenzie reported after one performance that "Milburn's speed astonished the crowd", whilst Joannou later reflected that "his pace always troubled opposing full-backs while he could also hit pinpoint crosses". Milburn continued to score goals himself and finished the season as United's second highest scorer with 14 goals, as Newcastle finished 6th in the Northern War League.

In total, Milburn made 95 appearances for Newcastle United in War League matches, scoring 38 goals. These goals do not count for official purposes as War League matches are designated as friendly matches.

==== Cup run and promotion (1946–1948) ====
United manager Stan Seymour almost entirely rebuilt his Second Division squad during the war so when United played Barnsley at St James' Park in the third round of the resumed FA Cup on 5 January 1946, Milburn, Bobby Cowell, Charlie Crowe, Joe Harvey and Charlie Wayman were five of nine players making their competitive debut. 60,284 spectators saw Milburn score twice – his first official goals for the club – in a 4–2 win. However, ties were contested over two legs that season and the return leg saw United beaten 3–0 and 4–5 on aggregate.

Competitive league football re-commenced for the 1946–47 season (although Milburn remained a fitter at Hazelrigg Colliery). United began at Millwall on 31 August 1946. United won 4–1, with Milburn and new signing Roy Bentley (2) scoring their first league goals for the club and another added by Stubbins. That was to prove Stubbins' last United goal as he was transferred to Liverpool on 12 September for £13,000. Stubbins' replacement, Len Shackleton, scored six on his debut in a 13–0 win on 5 October at St James' Park against Newport County. Milburn also scored twice in the match. The winning margin (13) remains a Football League record. With Milburn deployed on the right wing supplying crosses for Shackleton and Wayman, United lost only three league games from the start of the season to Christmas Eve 1946 and led the table. However, three consecutive defeats over the Christmas period checked their momentum and during the extremely harsh winter of 1947 Newcastle's form noticeably dipped and they fell out of promotion contention. Attention turned instead to the FA Cup. Milburn had been sidelined through injury until late February 1947 but he returned for the 5th round replay at Leicester City and helped United to a 2–1 win. On 1 March 1947, Milburn, playing at outside right, scored Newcastle's second goal in a 2–0 quarter final win at Sheffield United. In the semi-final against Charlton Athletic at Elland Road on 29 March United were beaten 4–0 amid reports of significant pre-match dressing-room acrimony. United eventually finished their league campaign in fifth-place. Milburn, who had played on the right flank for almost the entire season, made 27 appearances in all competitions and scored 8 goals.

The 1947–48 season began with a new manager after George Martin took charge after Seymour stepped down. Hutchinson claimed that: "the pressure on United to get out of Division Two was enormous" but they opened the season with a 6–1 win against Plymouth Argyle, with Milburn scoring. Leading scorer Wayman was sold to Southampton in October, leading to a discussion between Martin, Seymour (now a director), Harvey, trainer Norman Smith and Milburn about his replacement:

Martin: "Jackie's the man".
Smith: "No, keep him at inside-left or on the wing".
Harvey: "Aye, he's not good enough in the air for centre-forward".
Milburn (violently shaking his head): "They're right. I'm not cut out to lead the attack. I'm happy where I am".
Martin: "You're wrong, all of you. Jackie will make a centre-forward and will get a cap into the bargain!"

Milburn, who later described Martin as "one of the most astute managers I've ever met", reluctantly accepted the decision and he later admitted that the switch "changed my life". Despite suffering a sleepless night through nerves, in the very next match against Bury, Milburn scored a hat-trick in a 5–3 win. In his next two games Milburn scored three more goals. By January–1948 Milburn's goals had helped Newcastle to second place in the league. According to Hutchinson, Luton Town arrived on 3–January "to face 64,931 fans and a Jackie Milburn blitzkrieg". Milburn scored a hat-trick, prompting the Sunday Sun to write: "Milburn's refreshing pace and enterprise dominated proceedings...his speed and abandon encourage high hopes that he will spearhead United to promotion". Despite defeat at Charlton Athletic in the FA Cup and the controversial sale of Shackleton to Sunderland in February, a Milburn goal to beat Bury 1–0 in March kept Newcastle in third place. United lost just one game from January to the end of the season, conceding just twice at home in that time, and were promoted in second place with a game to spare. Milburn finished the season as top-scorer with 20 goals in 40 matches.

==== Playing in the First Division (1948–1950) ====
Prior to the start of the 1948–49 season, Milburn was diagnosed at the Royal Victoria Infirmary with external otitis which prevented him from working underground at Hazelrigg, though he continued surface work. On the pitch, according to Joannou, "Milburn went off like a bomb". He scored in the first home game of the season, for the fourth season running, in a 2–2 draw with Chelsea on 25 August 1948, and then scored five in his next six league matches. Milburn's form was such that he won his first England cap on 9 October. Two weeks later, Milburn put a transfer request to the Newcastle board, stating that: "I need to get away from Tyneside as my wife's health is suffering". The request "sent Tyneside into a panic" but was soon withdrawn after an intervention by Stan Seymour. Milburn later explained that he had been swayed by his international colleagues to believe that "big money could be made...outside of soccer if I moved to another club...on reflection, I realised what a foolish young chap I'd been". Meanwhile, United were "enjoying themselves back at the top"; on Christmas Eve 1948, Newcastle led the Division One table by a point. However, despite signing Bobby Mitchell and George Robledo in January 1949 and Milburn's continued good form (including a hat-trick at Aston Villa in a 3–2 win), United were knocked out of the FA Cup in the third round by Bradford Park Avenue and their title hopes were effectively ended when eventual champions Portsmouth left St James' Park with a 5–0 win on 6 April. Milburn did not play that match due to international duty. Newcastle eventually finished in 4th place and Milburn top-scored again with 19 goals in all competitions.

In the summer of 1949, Newcastle United embarked upon a tour of the United States. The arrival of United, and Milburn especially, was widely reported; the Winnipeg Free Press reported: "Newcastle United is a magic name, a name forever in lights. Jackie Milburn, a pit electrician and the club's present centre-forward, is considered the fastest player in English soccer and is of international class." Milburn lived up to his reputation; in ten matches played United won all ten and Milburn scored 31 goals. The 1949–50 season started poorly with three straight defeats but as Milburn and Robledo began to develop as a partnership, and Harvey and Brennan returned from injury, form and results began to improve. A Milburn goal, and another from George Hannah on his debut helped beat Manchester City 4–2 at St James' on 17 September 1949. Despite what Hutchinson described as "some promising wins", including a 4–2 win over Stoke City and a 5–1 win over West Bromwich Albion, with Milburn scoring three in those games, United were unable to fully recover from their poor start though they finished the season in 5th place without ever seriously threatening to challenge for the league title and their interest in the FA Cup was ended by a 4th round defeat at Chelsea in the 4th round. Milburn was top-scorer once more with 18 league and 1 FA Cup goals and, according to Joannou, "he now had become accustomed to the centre-forward's trade, looked the part...and had become the countries new rising star".

==== FA Cup glory (1950–1952) ====
Milburn put aside the disappointment of the 1950 World Cup by scoring twice to help beat Stoke City in Newcastle's opening game of the 1950–51 season. Milburn's goalscoring form, which included a hat-trick in a 6–0 win against Huddersfield Town, helped United to a ten-game unbeaten start to the season and took them to the top the table. They were finally beaten at Villa Park 3–0 on 7 October 1950. Milburn missed the match as he sat at Windsor Park as an unused substitute for England. United recovered with four straight wins but when they travelled to White Hart Lane to face second-placed Tottenham Hotspur on 18 November they were beaten 7–0 and manager Martin resigned. He was immediately replaced by Stan Seymour.

On 13 January 1951, Newcastle, at one stage title favourites, were beaten 3–1 at Stamford Bridge and had fallen to fifth in the league, five points from top spot. They then turned their attentions to the FA Cup. Milburn scored one of the four goals which beat Bury in the 3rd round. Bolton Wanderers, inspired by two assists from Nat Lofthouse, led 2–1 early in the second half of the 4th round tie at St James'. Milburn settled "a terrific meeting" with two second half goals; the first after a sharp turn and shot from 15 yards and the second saw him beat the offside trap to run clear and score. He was denied a hat-trick when a late header struck the bar and rebounded to safety. A Robledo brace and another goal from Milburn helped beat Stoke City 4–2 in the next round and another Milburn strike helped defeat Bristol Rovers 3–1 in a sixth-round replay. In the semi-final against Wolverhampton Wanderers on 10 March at Hillborough, Milburn had a goal ruled out for offside in a tense 0–0 draw. In the replay four days later at Huddersfield, United recovered from a 1–0 deficit to win 2–1 thanks to another Milburn goal and a winner from Brennan after he was put clear by Milburn. Milburn score six goals up to the final and scored in every round played.

United's cup run had coincided with a return to good league form and the press responded to Newcastle's semi-final win with speculation of a possible league and cup double; they lay fifth in the table, six points behind leaders Tottenham but with three games in-hand. However, when Seymour told his players in the dressing room after the semi-final win: "whatever happens, you fellows who brought us this far will play at Wembley", he inadvertently encouraged a malaise which destroyed Newcastle's title chances. Milburn later said that "quite unconsciously, every man who is going to play in a great match doesn't put everything he possesses into ordinary league games before the great day" and he, Taylor and Harvey were just three of the senior players who found themselves 'rested' in the games prior to the final as Newcastle "tottered from one defeat to another" to end their title chances.

Newcastle's form was so poor that by 28 April 1951, the day of the 1951 FA Cup Final, United had been replaced as favourites by their opponents Blackpool, who finished the season in 3rd place, one place higher than United, in Division One. Blackpool were also the popular choice among the public and press, many of whom had christened the fixture "The Matthews Final" hoping to see 36-year-old Stanley Matthews win the FA Cup for the first time. Milburn, annoyed by Blackpool's favoured status, later described his determination "to spoil Matthews' Wembley party". In the first half of the match, Milburn had a goal ruled out by referee William Ling for handball. Milburn later argued that "he was wrong – I never touched it!" – a claim vindicated by slow-motion replays. The goalless first half was a "disappointing encounter for the neutral" as Blackpool frustrated United and Milburn with a well-drilled offside trap. However, five minutes into the second half Robledo played a through-ball to Milburn who broke the offside trap, raced clear and sidefooted home to put United 1–0 up. Five minutes later, Milburn scored again. After a passing move on the right wing, the ball was played to Ernie Taylor who immediately back-heeled the ball to Milburn 25 yards from goal who in turn hit a first time, left-footed shot into the top corner of the Blackpool net with such force that he fell over in striking it. Milburn's second goal was of such quality that Blackpool forward Stan Mortensen held up the restart for several seconds in order to congratulate the scorer and told him "that's just about the greatest goal I've ever seen. It deserves to win the cup". United held on comfortably to win the match 2–0 and Matthews was in no doubt as to why United had won, telling the press afterwards:

It was definitely Milburn's match! His terrific speed made the first. The second was right out of the world! It was the greatest goal I have ever seen and certainly the finest scored at Wembley. A goal every player dreams about.

Milburn's brace took his season's FA Cup total to 8 goals in 8 games. He also top-scored in the league with 17 goals.

After a fractious pre-season which saw several players sold, United began the 1951–52 season in very good form despite Milburn missing several matches due to pulled leg muscle. In their first four home matches of the season, United scored 20 goals and conceded three. When fit again, Milburn asked to be selected for the reserves so as to not disturb a winning side, later explaining that "I thought it unfair that the forward line should be changed to accommodate me and Mr. Seymour accepted my request". Milburn returned to the first-team in time to score in the 1–2 defeat to Tottenham Hotspur in the 1951 FA Charity Shield and by 12 January 1952, Milburn had scored 16 league goals which, along with Robledo's 26 goals, meant United were in 4th place in Division One (with a game in hand) and once more tipped among the press for a league and cup double. However, United's hopes of retaining the FA Cup almost ended in round three when Aston Villa led 0–2 and 1–3 at St James' Park. Three goals in the last nine minutes of the match gave Newcastle a 4–2 win.

Prior to Milburn scoring his 100th competitive Newcastle goal in a 1–2 defeat at Burnley on 20 January, Milburn had been linked with a move to league champions Tottenham Hotspur. Milburn afterwards pledged his future to United, telling reporters "I object to these stories that have persistently linked me with other clubs. I have never been happier than I am now with Newcastle United, If I leave Newcastle it will happen because they have kicked me out". Now four points behind Manchester United in the league but with three games in hand, United travelled to White Hart Lane in the 4th round of the FA Cup and beat the champions 3–0. before winning a 5th round tie at Swansea Town 1–0. In contrast to the previous campaign, Milburn had failed to score in the competition prior to a quarter-final meeting with Portsmouth at Fratton Park on 8 March. In a match described by The People as "the cup-tie of the decade", Milburn scored what author Younger later called "a stunning hat-trick" in helping United to a 4–2 win. In their report the following day, the Sunday Express exclaimed; "without exaggerating I should say that Milburn turned in one of the best centre-forward displays of all time". After a 0–0 draw against Blackburn Rovers in the semi-final at Hillsborough, Milburn provided an assist early in the second half of the replay to help Newcastle to a 2–1 victory and a second successive cup final.

However, progress in the FA Cup triggered another collapse in league form. After the victory against Spurs in the 4th round of the cup, United played 16 further league games and accumulated 11 points; Sunday Times reporter Arthur Appleton recalled that: "The BBC asked me to record the sound of a Newcastle goal being acclaimed by the crowd. I followed them from match to match and they never scored a goal; they were keeping themselves for Wembley." United eventually finished in 8th place, 12 points behind champions Manchester United. On 3 May 1952, Newcastle and Milburn travelled to Wembley to play Arsenal in the FA Cup final. In the 24th minute, Arsenal right back Wally Barnes suffered a serious injury after his studs were caught in the Wembley turf. As substitutes were not permitted, the injury meant Arsenal had to play with ten men for the rest of the match. Milburn had a quiet match, though he almost scored with a header which was cleared off the goal line, a goal from Robledo five minutes from time meant Newcastle became the first team in the 20th century to retain the cup.

Milburn scored 25 league goals during the season and was the second highest scorer at the club behind George Robledo.

==== Transition and a third cup win: 1952–1955 ====
Milburn joined his teammates on a tour of South Africa in the summer of 1952, but suffered a series of niggling injuries which limited his appearances to just five of the seventeen games United played, and he also missed the 2–4 defeat to Manchester United in the 1952 FA Charity Shield. Injuries continued to limit his appearances – he didn't score a goal until he converted a penalty in a 2–0 win over Manchester City on 27 September 1952.

=== Later career ===
In June 1957, Milburn left the Magpies to join Belfast club Linfield as player-manager at Windsor Park, where he won 9 trophies (including an Irish League title and Irish Cup win), and finished as the league's top goalscorer in both the 1957–58 and 1958–59 seasons to become the first non-Irishman to become the Irish League's top scorer. When he left Linfield, he dropped down to non-league level, and played for Southern Football League Division One club Yiewsley for two seasons.

After retiring as a player, he went on to briefly manage Ipswich Town, before returning to Tyneside to become a sports journalist for the News of the World. According to author Dylan Younger, he also acted as 'an unofficial advisor to Newcastle managers', including forming a close relationship with former teammate Joe Harvey. He would work for the News of the World for the next 23 years.

In 1967, he was given a belated testimonial match by Newcastle. Milburn had worried that ten years after leaving the club, people would have forgotten, but he needn't have worried, as almost 50,000 turned out at St. James' Park for the match. It featured a host of stars including his cousins, the famous World Cup winning brothers, Jack and Bobby Charlton, and the great Hungarian player Ferenc Puskás.

In 1980, Milburn was the first footballer to be made a Freeman of the City of Newcastle upon Tyne – an honour later also bestowed on former opponent Bobby Robson, and the man who surpassed his Newcastle United goalscoring records, Alan Shearer. He was the subject of This Is Your Life in 1981, when he was surprised by Eamonn Andrews at the studios of Tyne Tees Television in Newcastle.

== Legacy ==
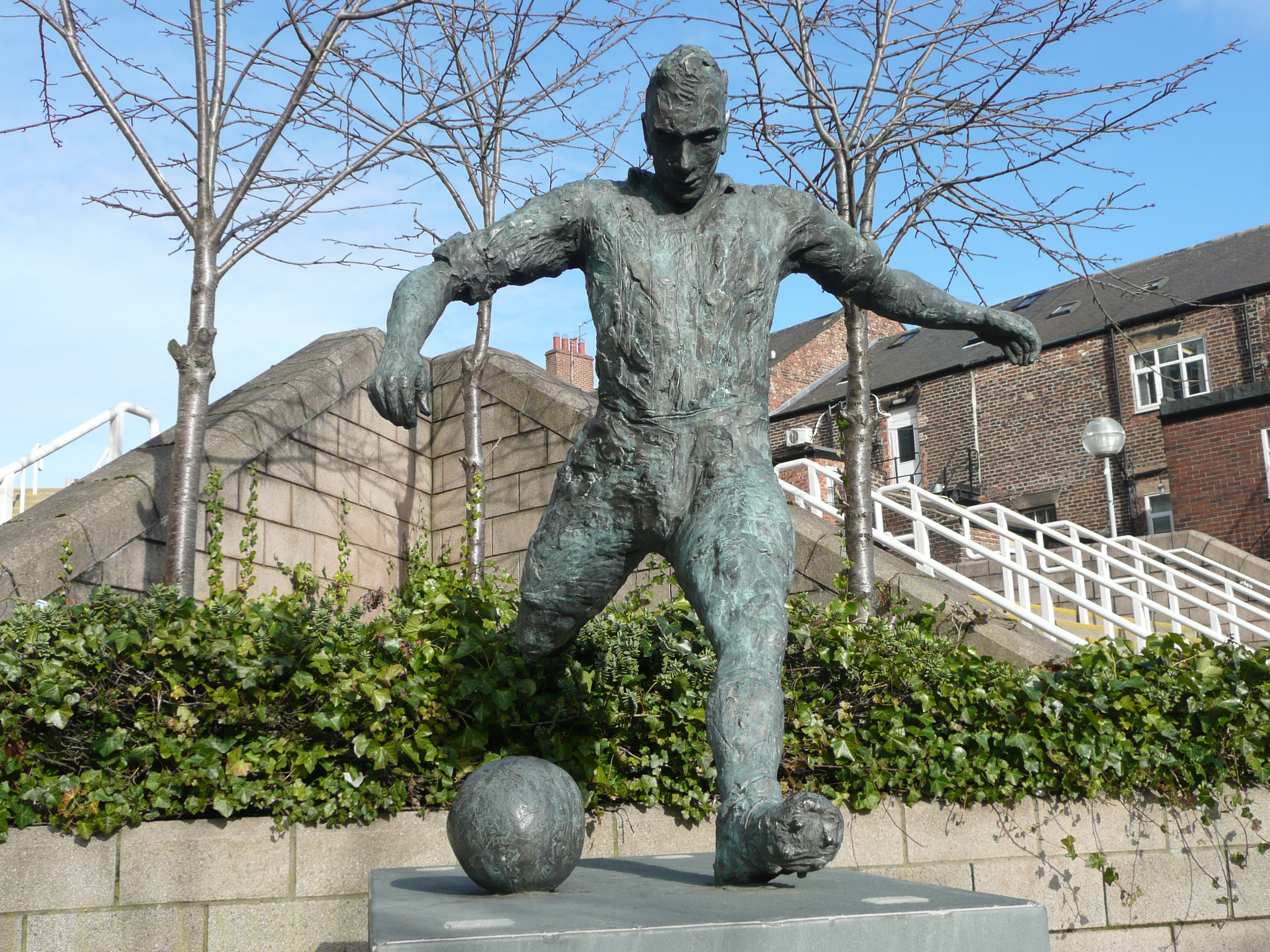
Statue of Milburn at St James' Park, 2013

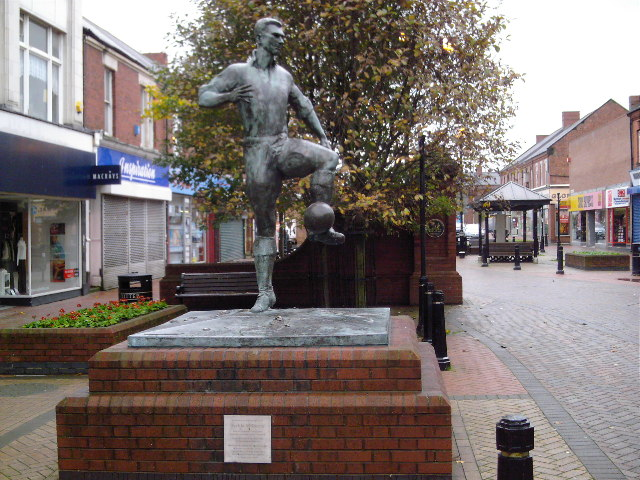
Statue of Milburn in Ashington

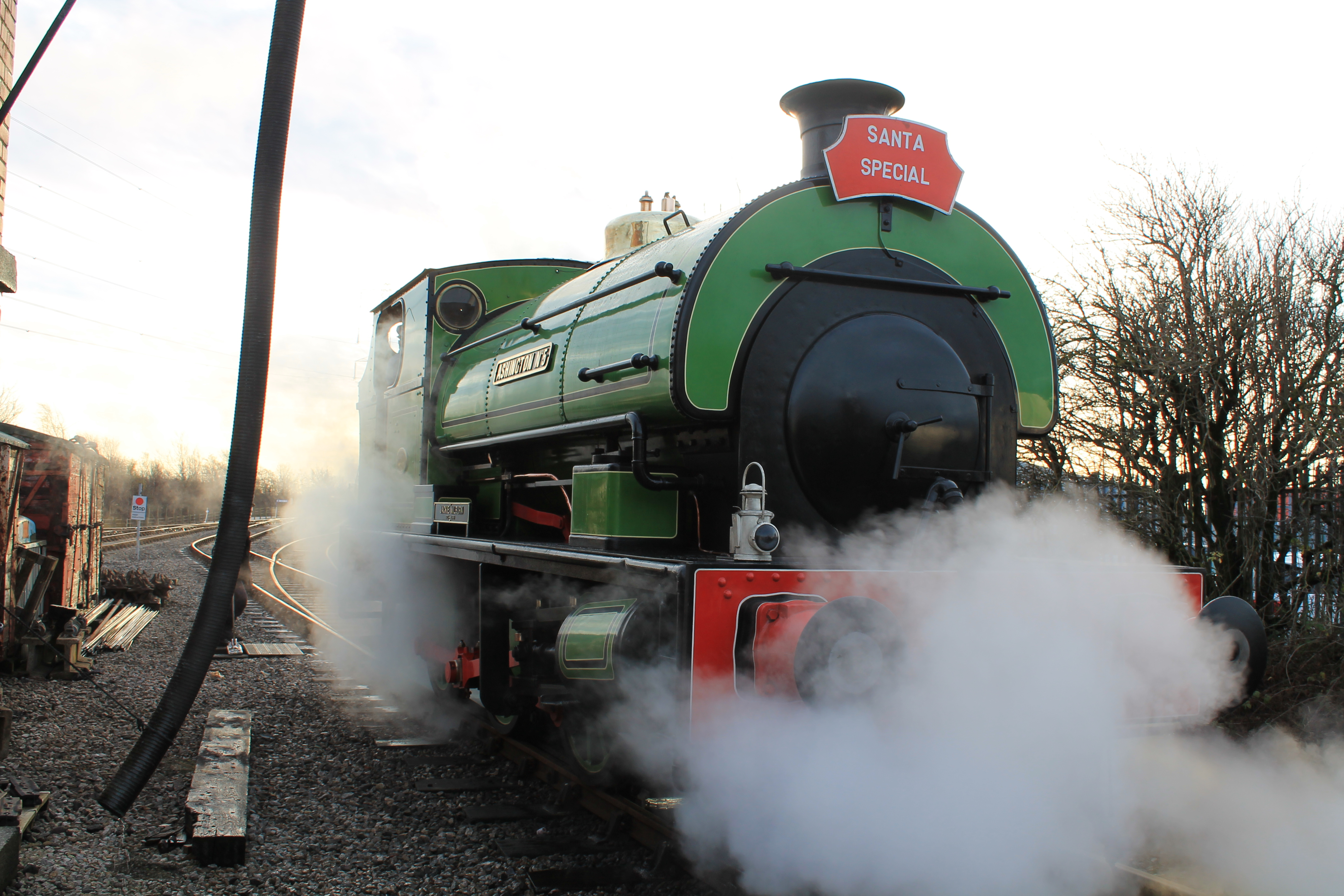
The Jackie Milburn locomotive

In 1987, Newcastle United opened their new West Stand at St James' Park. This was named the Milburn Stand, in honour of Jackie.This remains the only stand named after a player at St James' Park.

Three statues of Milburn were commissioned. One was placed in Station Road in his birthplace Ashington. The funds were raised by the Civic Head, Cllr. Michael George Ferrigon during his term of Office. It now stands at Ashington Leisure Centre in Lintonville Terrace. A second statue of Milburn was unveiled by Laura Milburn on Newcastle's Northumberland Street in 1991. It was designed by sculptor Susanna Robinson and cost £35,000. The fee was raised after an appeal by the local newspaper attracted donations from local businesses and Newcastle United supporters. The statue stands 12 feet (3.7 m) high and the inscription reads: John Edward Thompson Milburn, footballer and gentleman. It was relocated in 1999 to St James' Boulevard, and then moved again to its present position on Strawberry Place, just outside St James' Park.

The whereabouts of the third statue had caused some local consternation in 2011, when the local newspaper recounted a fibreglass statue of Milburn located outside St James' Park between 1996 and 1998, but which had since vanished. The statue was 'found' in the garden of the sculptor who had created it, Tom Maley, who had held it after it was returned to him by Newcastle United to cast in bronze – an arrangement which was cancelled when the club was sold to Mike Ashley in 2007.

In 1987, Milburn was voted the 'greatest post-war North East footballer' by the local press. In 1991, a steam locomotive which had previously hauled coal at Ashington Colliery where Milburn had worked was renamed Jackie Milburn in his honour. After a fundraising initiative launched in 2006, by Jack Milburn Jr to restore the locomotive, it was displayed in Milburn's hometown again in 2011. In 2006, Milburn was inducted into the English Football Hall of Fame in recognition of his contribution to English football. In 2008, Excelsior Academy School in Newcastle's West End was assigned the official name 'Milburn School of Sport and Health-related Studies'. In 2009, Goal.com listed Milburn 43rd in their list of the 'top English players of all time'. A feature in the Belfast Telegraph to celebrate the 125th anniversary of Linfield, listed Milburn as the second greatest player to have ever represented the club. In 2012, a survey by the Evening Chronicle placed Milburn first, ahead of Bobby Robson and Catherine Cookson, in their list of '100 Greatest Geordies'. Sport Newcastle's 'Young Talent' award is entitled the Wor Jackie Award in honour of Milburn.

He was also the subject of a 53-minute documentary, "A Tribute to Jackie Milburn: Tyneside's Favourite Son", produced by Tyne Tees Television, and later released in 1989 by Video Gems on VHS. It covered his life, times, and career with Newcastle United.

== Personal life ==
In 1947, Milburn was staying at a Letchworth hotel with his Newcastle teammates, when he met Laura Blackwood – a silver-service waitress working at the hotel. According to Blackwood, she was serving him breakfast when he 'asked her out' and they went to the cinema. Three months later, she travelled to the family home in Ashington and Milburn proposed. They married on 16 February 1948 at Willesden Register Office in North London. They had three children.

== Career statistics ==
Appearances and goals by club, season and competition
Club	Season	League			Cup		Other		Total	
Club	Season	Division	Apps	Goals	Apps	Goals	Apps	Goals	Apps	Goals
Newcastle United	1945–46	—			2	2	—		2	2
Newcastle United	1946–47	Second Division	24	7	3	1	—		27	8
Newcastle United	1947–48	Second Division	39	20	1	0	—		40	20
Newcastle United	1948–49	First Division	34	19	1	0	—		35	19
Newcastle United	1949–50	First Division	30	18	2	3	—		32	21
Newcastle United	1950–51	First Division	31	17	8	8	—		39	25
Newcastle United	1951–52	First Division	32	25	7	3	1 (Note: Appearance(s) in FA Charity Shield)	1	40	29
Newcastle United	1952–53	First Division	16	5	0	0	0	0	16	5
Newcastle United	1953–54	First Division	39	16	5	2	—		44	18
Newcastle United	1954–55	First Division	38	19	10	2	—		48	21
Newcastle United	1955–56	First Division	38	19	4	2	1	0	43	21
Newcastle United	1956–57	First Division	32	12	1	0	—		33	12
Total			353	177	44	23	2	1	399	201

== Honours ==
=== As a player ===
Newcastle United

- FA Cup: 1950–51, 1951–52, 1954–55

Linfield

- Irish League championship: 1958–59, 1959–60
- Irish Cup: 1959–60

Individual

- Ulster Footballer of the Year: 1957–58
- English Football Hall of Fame Inductee: 2006
