= George Robledo =

Chilean footballer (1926–1989)

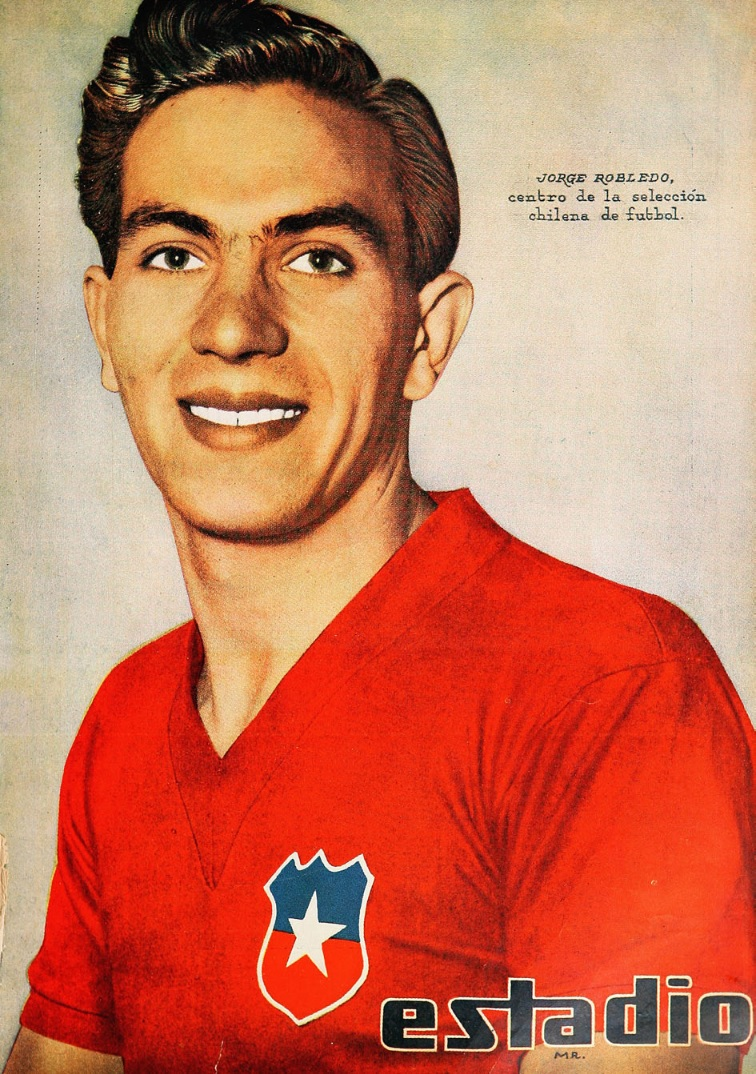
- Robledo in the kit of the Chile national team (1950)

Personal information
- Full name: George Oliver Robledo
- Date of birth: 14 April 1926
- Place of birth: Iquique, Chile
- Date of death: 1 April 1989 (aged 62)
- Place of death: Viña del Mar, Chile
- Height: 1.75 m (5 ft 9 in)
- Position: Inside forward

Senior career*
Years	Team	Apps	(Gls)
1946–1949	Barnsley	105	(45)
1949–1953	Newcastle United	146	(82)
1953–1958	Colo-Colo	153	(84)
1959–1960	O'Higgins	21	(6)
Total		425	(217)

International career
1950–1957	Chile	31	(8)

Managerial career
- 1955: Colo-Colo
- * Club domestic league appearances and goals

George Oliver Robledo (14 April 1926 – 1 April 1989) was a Chilean professional footballer. An inside forward, and is most notable for his time spent with Newcastle United. He was the first non-British-registered foreign player to become top scorer in England.

== Background ==
Robledo was born in Iquique, Chile to a Chilean father and an English mother. He emigrated with his family to Brampton, Yorkshire in 1932, at the age of five, due to the instability in Chile at the time.

== Club career ==
Robledo started his footballing career at Huddersfield Town, playing as a part-time amateur while he earned his money coal mining, though he never managed to break into the first team. He was able to give up the coal mining when he moved to Second Division Barnsley during World War II. First Division club Newcastle United signed him on 27 January 1949, for a fee of £26,500. The fee included his brother Ted; this is because Newcastle were only interested in buying George but he refused to move without his brother.

Robledo's league debut for Newcastle came in the 2–0 victory away to Charlton Athletic on 5 February, while his first league goal came a month later in the derby match against Sunderland at St James' Park. Newcastle came out of the match 2–1 winners, with Robledo's goal separating the sides, helping to quickly make him a fan favourite. The other Newcastle goal scorer was Jackie Milburn, marking the start of one of the great striking partnerships in Newcastle United's history. Robledo went on to score 5 more goals in the last 12 games of the season.

The following season, Robledo scored 11 goals for Newcastle, then netted 14 times in the 1950–51 season and became the first South American to play in the FA Cup final, when Newcastle beat Blackpool 2–0 to lift the Cup. Robledo finished as Division One's top scorer in the 1951–52 season with 33 goals, 39 in all competitions (equalling Hughie Gallacher's record). Robledo finished the season by scoring the goal which defeated Arsenal in the FA Cup final, helping Newcastle lift the cup in successive seasons. The goal scored by Robledo was drawn by a young John Lennon, who included it in the artwork of his album Walls and Bridges in 1974.

External videos
- Robledo goal in the 1952 cup final. Pathe Films.

In the 1952–53 season, Robledo scored 18 times, taking his all time goals record for Newcastle to 91 and his league record to 82 (making him the highest scoring (non-Irish) overseas player in the English top flight, a record that was broken nearly half a century later by Dwight Yorke). At the end of the season, Ted Robledo was sold to Colo-Colo and George soon followed him, with Colo-Colo paying Newcastle £25,000 for his services. Both brothers were highly popular in Chile, and George ended as top scorer in the Chilean league in 1953 and 1954, with 26 and 25 goals respectively.

On 23 November 1956, Robledo assumed as the President of the Sindicato Profesional de Jugadores de Fútbol (Professional Trade Union of Football Players) in Chile.

Robledo left Colo-Colo in 1958, and spent a year out of football, before signing for Club Deportivo O'Higgins where he played out the final years of his career, until his retirement in 1960.

== International career ==
Chile recruited Robledo for the 1950 FIFA World Cup, even though he spoke no Spanish. He made his debut in the opening group game against England (one of his opponents reputedly warned him after he had hit the post "Steady, George, you're not playing for Newcastle now, you know") and scored in Chile's 5–2 victory over the United States. He was in the Chile squad for the 1955 and 1957 South American Championships, finishing as runner-up in the former tournament.

Robledo made thirty-one appearances for his national side, scoring eight goals over a period of seven years.

== Personal life ==
Robledo married in 1959, and later had a daughter. He finally retired from football in 1961 and took charge of the sports program in St Peter's school, Viña del Mar, where he remained leading a quiet life until his death of a heart attack on 1 April 1989, just before his 63rd birthday. He was survived by his wife Gladys and daughter Elizabeth.

His brother Ted had died nearly 20 years earlier, having fallen from an oil tanker into the sea off the coast of Dubai in December 1970. His body has never been found.

In May 2022, his daughter, Elizabeth, announced that she would auction some belongings of her father. The shirt with which George scored the goal against Arsenal in the 1952 FA Cup final – the goal that was included in the artwork of the John Lennon album Walls and Bridges – was sold for £7,500.

== Honours ==
Newcastle United

- FA Cup: 1950–51, 1951–52

Colo-Colo

- Primera División de Chile: 1953, 1956
- Copa Chile: 1958

Individual

- Football League First Division top scorer: 1951–52
- Primera División de Chile top scorer: 1953, 1954
