= 1951–52 FA Cup =

Tournament details
- Country: England; Wales

Final positions
- Champions: Newcastle United (5th title)
- Runners-up: Arsenal

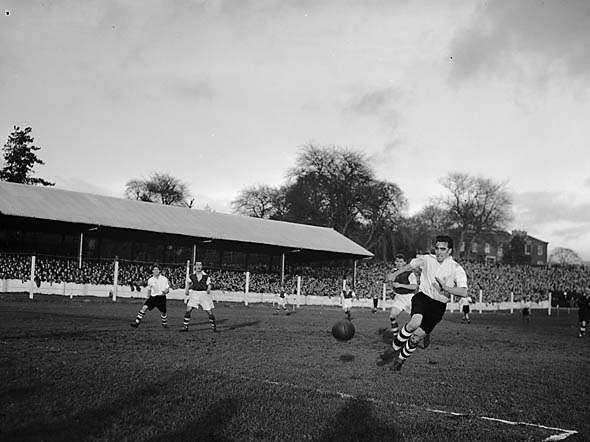
Merthyr Tydfil F.C. v Ipswich Town F.C. in the 1st round

The 1951–52 FA Cup was the 71st season of the world's oldest football cup competition, the Football Association Challenge Cup, commonly known as the FA Cup. Newcastle United won the competition for the fifth time, beating Arsenal 1–0 in the final at Wembley.

Matches were scheduled to be played at the stadium of the team named first on the date specified for each round, which was always a Saturday. Some matches, however, might be rescheduled for other days if there were clashes with games for other competitions or the weather was inclement. If scores were level after 90 minutes had been played, a replay would take place at the stadium of the second-named team later the same week. If the replayed match was drawn further replays would be held until a winner was determined. If scores were level after 90 minutes had been played in a replay, a 30-minute period of extra time would be played.

== Calendar ==
Round	Date
Preliminary round	Saturday 15 September 1951
First round qualifying	Saturday 29 September 1951
Second round qualifying	Saturday 13 October 1951
Third round qualifying	Saturday 27 October 1951
Fourth round qualifying	Saturday 10 November 1951
First round proper	Saturday 24 November 1951
Second round proper	Saturday 15 December 1951
Third round proper	Saturday 12 January 1952
Fourth round proper	Saturday 2 February 1952
Fifth round proper	Saturday 23 February 1952
Sixth round proper	Saturday 8 March 1952
Semi-finals	Saturday 29 March 1952
Final	Saturday 3 May 1952

== Qualifying rounds ==
Most participating clubs that were not members of the Football League competed in the qualifying rounds to secure one of 30 places available in the first round.

The winners from the fourth qualifying round were Blackhall Colliery Welfare, Stockton, Blyth Spartans, Goole Town, Billingham Synthonia, Rhyl, Nelson, Bangor City, Witton Albion, Kettering Town, Brush Sports, Hereford United, Rawmarsh Welfare, Buxton, Gainsborough Trinity, Ilkeston Town, Bedford Town, King's Lynn, Gorleston, Leytonstone, Tonbridge, Folkestone Town, Leyton, Guildford City, Aylesbury United, Barnstaple Town, Chippenham Town, Weymouth, Merthyr Tydfil and Barry Town.

Those appearing in the competition proper for the first time were Blackhall Colliery Welfare, Bangor City, Rawmarsh Welfare, Buxton, Ilkeston Town, Gorleston, Aylesbury United, Barnstaple Town and Chippenham Town. Of the others, Bedford Town, Leyton and Barry Town were featuring at this stage for the first time since 1934–35.

Competition restructuring this season lead to the abolition of the extra preliminary round (which would not be reinstated for 50 years). Buxton was the most successful of the qualifying clubs, competing in eight rounds of the competition before going out in the third round proper. The Bucks defeated Hyde United, Macclesfield Town, Winsford United, Congleton Town and Frickley Colliery to reach the main draw before seeing off Rawmarsh Welfare and Aldershot for a third round meeting with Second Division outfit Doncaster Rovers.

== First round proper ==
At this stage clubs from the Football League Third Division North and South joined the non-league clubs that came through the qualifying rounds. Non-league sides Bishop Auckland and Bromley received byes to this round, with Bishop Auckland being the runners-up from the previous year's FA Amateur Cup (and having the bye passed on to them as the champions, Pegasus did not compete in the FA Cup).

Matches were scheduled to be played on Saturday, 24 November 1951. Eight were drawn and went to replays, with three of these going to second replays.

Tie no	Home team	Score	Away team	Date
1	Barrow	0–2	Chesterfield	24 November 1951
2	Nelson	0–4	Oldham Athletic	24 November 1951
3	Tonbridge	0–0	Aldershot	24 November 1951
Replay	Aldershot	3–2	Tonbridge	28 November 1951
4	Reading	1–0	Walsall	24 November 1951
5	Leyton	3–0	Chippenham Town	24 November 1951
6	Grimsby Town	4–0	Darlington	24 November 1951
7	Crewe Alexandra	2–4	Lincoln City	24 November 1951
8	Swindon Town	2–0	Bedford Town	24 November 1951
9	Stockton	1–1	Mansfield Town	24 November 1951
Replay	Mansfield Town	0–2	Stockton	28 November 1951
10	Wrexham	3–0	Halifax Town	24 November 1951
11	Tranmere Rovers	4–2	Goole Town	24 November 1951
12	Stockport County	2–2	Gateshead	24 November 1951
Replay	Gateshead	1–1	Stockport County	28 November 1951
Replay	Stockport County	1–2	Gateshead	3 December 1951
13	Leytonstone	2–0	Shrewsbury Town	24 November 1951
14	Bangor City	2–2	Southport	24 November 1951
Replay	Southport	3–0	Bangor City	27 November 1951
15	Accrington Stanley	1–2	Chester	24 November 1951
16	Aylesbury United	0–5	Watford	24 November 1951
17	Bristol Rovers	3–0	Kettering Town	24 November 1951
18	King's Lynn	1–3	Exeter City	24 November 1951
19	Brighton & Hove Albion	1–2	Bristol City	24 November 1951
20	Norwich City	3–2	Northampton Town	24 November 1951
21	Bradford City	6–1	Carlisle United	24 November 1951
22	Millwall	1–0	Plymouth Argyle	24 November 1951
23	Crystal Palace	0–1	Gillingham	24 November 1951
24	Witton Albion	2–1	Gainsborough Trinity	24 November 1951
25	Southend United	6–1	Bournemouth & Boscombe Athletic	24 November 1951
26	Hartlepools United	2–0	Rhyl	24 November 1951
27	Scunthorpe & Lindsey United	5–0	Billingham Synthonia	24 November 1951
28	Blyth Spartans	2–1	Bishop Auckland	24 November 1951
29	Newport County	4–0	Barry Town	24 November 1951
30	Torquay United	3–2	Bromley	24 November 1951
31	York City	1–1	Bradford Park Avenue	24 November 1951
Replay	Bradford Park Avenue	1–1	York City	28 November 1951
Replay	York City	0–4	Bradford Park Avenue	3 December 1951
32	Guildford City	4–1	Hereford United	24 November 1951
33	Rawmarsh Welfare	1–4	Buxton	24 November 1951
34	Blackhall Colliery Welfare	2–5	Workington	24 November 1951
35	Colchester United	3–1	Port Vale	24 November 1951
36	Leyton Orient	2–2	Gorleston	24 November 1951
Replay	Gorleston	0–0	Leyton Orient	29 November 1951
Replay	Leyton Orient	5–4	Gorleston	3 December 1951
37	Brush Sports	2–3	Weymouth	24 November 1951
38	Merthyr Tydfil	2–2	Ipswich Town	24 November 1951
Replay	Ipswich Town	1–0	Merthyr Tydfil	5 December 1951
39	Ilkeston Town	0–2	Rochdale	24 November 1951
40	Barnstaple Town	2–2	Folkestone Town	24 November 1951
Replay	Folkestone Town	5–2	Barnstaple Town	28 November 1951

== Second round proper ==
The matches were played on Saturday, 15 December 1951. Seven matches were drawn, with replays taking place later the same week. Three of these replays went to a second replay, with the Tranmere Rovers–Blyth Spartans game going to a third.

Tie no	Home team	Score	Away team	Date
1	Chester	5–2	Leyton	15 December 1951
2	Watford	1–2	Hartlepools United	15 December 1951
3	Reading	1–1	Southport	15 December 1951
Replay	Southport	1–1	Reading	18 December 1951
Replay	Reading	2–0	Southport	1 January 1952
4	Gillingham	0–3	Rochdale	15 December 1951
5	Lincoln City	3–1	Grimsby Town	15 December 1951
6	Swindon Town	3–3	Torquay United	15 December 1951
Replay	Torquay United	1-1	Swindon Town	19 December 1951
Replay	Swindon Town	3-1	Torquay United	2 January 1952
7	Stockton	2–1	Folkestone Town	15 December 1951
8	Wrexham	1–1	Leyton Orient	15 December 1951
Replay	Leyton Orient	3–2	Wrexham	19 December 1951
9	Ipswich Town	4–0	Exeter City	15 December 1951
10	Buxton	4–3	Aldershot	15 December 1951
11	Tranmere Rovers	1–1	Blyth Spartans	15 December 1951
Replay	Blyth Spartans	1–1	Tranmere Rovers	19 December 1951
Replay	Tranmere Rovers	2–2	Blyth Spartans	3 January 1952
Replay	Tranmere Rovers	5–1	Blyth Spartans	7 January 1952
12	Leytonstone	2–2	Newport County	15 December 1951
Replay	Newport County	3–0	Leytonstone	20 December 1951
13	Bristol Rovers	2–0	Weymouth	15 December 1951
14	Norwich City	3–1	Chesterfield	15 December 1951
15	Millwall	0–0	Scunthorpe & Lindsey United	15 December 1951
Replay	Scunthorpe & Lindsey United	3–0	Millwall	20 December 1951
16	Witton Albion	3–3	Workington	15 December 1951
Replay	Workington	1–0	Witton Albion	20 December 1951
17	Southend United	5–0	Oldham Athletic	15 December 1951
18	Bradford Park Avenue	3–2	Bradford City	15 December 1951
19	Gateshead	2–0	Guildford City	15 December 1951
20	Colchester United	2–1	Bristol City	15 December 1951

== Third round proper ==
The 44 First and Second Division clubs entered the competition at this stage. The matches were scheduled for Saturday, 12 January 1952. Nine matches were drawn and went to replays, with one of these going to a second replay. Stockton and Buxton were the last non-league clubs remaining in the competition.

Tie no	Home team	Score	Away team	Date
1	Burnley	1–0	Hartlepools United	12 January 1952
2	Liverpool	1–0	Workington	12 January 1952
3	Rochdale	0–2	Leeds United	12 January 1952
4	Reading	0–3	Swansea Town	12 January 1952
5	Leicester City	1–1	Coventry City	12 January 1952
Replay	Coventry City	4–1	Leicester City	14 January 1952
6	Notts County	4–0	Stockton	12 January 1952
7	Nottingham Forest	2–2	Blackburn Rovers	12 January 1952
Replay	Blackburn Rovers	2–0	Nottingham Forest	16 January 1952
8	Middlesbrough	2–2	Derby County	12 January 1952
Replay	Derby County	0–2	Middlesbrough	16 January 1952
9	West Bromwich Albion	4–0	Bolton Wanderers	12 January 1952
10	Sunderland	0–0	Stoke City	12 January 1952
Replay	Stoke City	3–1	Sunderland	14 January 1952
11	Luton Town	1–0	Charlton Athletic	12 January 1952
12	Doncaster Rovers	2–0	Buxton	12 January 1952
13	Sheffield United	2–0	Newport County	12 January 1952
14	Ipswich Town	2–2	Gateshead	12 January 1952
Replay	Gateshead	3–3	Ipswich Town	16 January 1952
Replay	Ipswich Town	1–2	Gateshead	21 January 1952
15	Newcastle United	4–2	Aston Villa	12 January 1952
16	Manchester City	2–2	Wolverhampton Wanderers	12 January 1952
Replay	Wolverhampton Wanderers	4–1	Manchester City	16 January 1952
17	Fulham	0–1	Birmingham City	12 January 1952
18	Barnsley	3–0	Colchester United	12 January 1952
19	Brentford	3–1	Queens Park Rangers	12 January 1952
20	Bristol Rovers	2–0	Preston North End	12 January 1952
21	Portsmouth	4–0	Lincoln City	12 January 1952
22	West Ham United	2–1	Blackpool	12 January 1952
23	Manchester United	0–2	Hull City	12 January 1952
24	Norwich City	0–5	Arsenal	12 January 1952
25	Chelsea	2–2	Chester	12 January 1952
Replay	Chester	2–3	Chelsea	16 January 1952
26	Southend United	3–0	Southampton	12 January 1952
27	Bradford Park Avenue	2–1	Sheffield Wednesday	12 January 1952
28	Scunthorpe & Lindsey United	0–3	Tottenham Hotspur	12 January 1952
29	Huddersfield Town	1–2	Tranmere Rovers	12 January 1952
30	Cardiff City	1–1	Swindon Town	12 January 1952
Replay	Swindon Town	1–0	Cardiff City	16 January 1952
31	Rotherham United	2–1	Bury	12 January 1952
32	Leyton Orient	0–0	Everton	12 January 1952
Replay	Everton	1–3	Leyton Orient	16 January 1952

== Fourth round proper ==
The matches were scheduled for Saturday, 2 February 1952, with the exception of two postponed matches. Three games were drawn and went to replays, which were all played in the following midweek match. One of these then went to a second replay before being settled.

Tie no	Home team	Score	Away team	Date
1	Burnley	2–0	Coventry City	2 February 1952
2	Liverpool	2–1	Wolverhampton Wanderers	2 February 1952
3	Notts County	1–3	Portsmouth	2 February 1952
4	Blackburn Rovers	2–0	Hull City	2 February 1952
5	Middlesbrough	1–4	Doncaster Rovers	6 February 1952
6	Luton Town	2–2	Brentford	2 February 1952
Replay	Brentford	0–0	Luton Town	6 February 1952
Replay	Luton Town	3–2	Brentford	18 February 1952
7	Swindon Town	1–1	Stoke City	2 February 1952
Replay	Stoke City	0–1	Swindon Town	4 February 1952
8	Tottenham Hotspur	0–3	Newcastle United	2 February 1952
9	West Ham United	0–0	Sheffield United	2 February 1952
Replay	Sheffield United	4–2	West Ham United	6 February 1952
10	Chelsea	4–0	Tranmere Rovers	2 February 1952
11	Southend United	2–1	Bristol Rovers	2 February 1952
12	Swansea Town	3–0	Rotherham United	2 February 1952
13	Arsenal	4–0	Barnsley	2 February 1952
14	Leeds United	2–0	Bradford Park Avenue	2 February 1952
15	Gateshead	0–2	West Bromwich Albion	6 February 1952
16	Birmingham City	0–1	Leyton Orient	2 February 1952

== Fifth round proper ==
The matches were scheduled for Saturday, 23 February 1952. The Leeds United–Chelsea game went to two replays before Chelsea won the tie.

Tie no	Home team	Score	Away team	Date
1	Burnley	2–0	Liverpool	23 February 1952
2	Blackburn Rovers	1–0	West Bromwich Albion	23 February 1952
3	Luton Town	3–1	Swindon Town	23 February 1952
4	Portsmouth	4–0	Doncaster Rovers	23 February 1952
5	Southend United	1–2	Sheffield United	23 February 1952
6	Swansea Town	0–1	Newcastle United	23 February 1952
7	Leeds United	1–1	Chelsea	23 February 1952
Replay	Chelsea	1–1	Leeds United	27 February 1952
Replay	Leeds United	1–5	Chelsea	3 March 1952
8	Leyton Orient	0–3	Arsenal	23 February 1952

== Sixth round proper ==
The four Sixth Round ties were scheduled to be played on Saturday, 8 March 1952. There were no replays.

Tie no	Home team	Score	Away team	Date
1	Blackburn Rovers	3–1	Burnley	8 March 1952
2	Luton Town	2–3	Arsenal	8 March 1952
3	Sheffield United	0–1	Chelsea	8 March 1952
4	Portsmouth	2–4	Newcastle United	8 March 1952

== Semi-finals ==
The semi-final matches were intended to be played on Saturday, 29 March 1952, although the Chelsea–Arsenal fixture was not played until the week after. Both matches went to a replay, with Arsenal and Newcastle United eventually winning their ties to meet in the final at Wembley.

29 March 1952
15:00

Newcastle United	0–0	Blackburn Rovers

Hillsborough, Sheffield

Replay

2 April 1952
19:45

Blackburn Rovers	1–2	Newcastle United

Elland Road, Leeds

5 April 1952
15:00

Chelsea	1–1	Arsenal

White Hart Lane, London

Replay

7 April 1952
19:45

Arsenal	3–0	Chelsea

White Hart Lane, London

== Final ==
The 1952 FA Cup Final took place at Wembley Stadium. It was contested between cup holders Newcastle United and Arsenal. Newcastle won 1–0 with a late goal from Chilean striker George Robledo

=== Match facts ===
3 May 1952
15:00 (BST)

Newcastle United	1–0	Arsenal
Robledo 84'	Report

Wembley Stadium, London
Attendance: 100,000
Referee: Arthur Ellis

Newcastle United	Arsenal

== See also ==
- FA Cup Final Results 1872-
