= List of Newcastle United F.C. managers =

Newcastle United Football Club is an English football club based in Newcastle upon Tyne, Tyne and Wear. Since 1930, there have been 34 official managers, the current manager being Matthias Jaissle, who was appointed on 5 August 2026. Statistically, the club's most successful manager is Chris Hughton, with a win percentage of 59.38. The club's longest-serving manager was Stan Seymour, who had three spells managing the club from 1939 to 1958, totalling almost fourteen years, while the most successful manager was Joe Harvey, who won five trophies (albeit that four were minor trophies) and also had the longest uninterrupted spell as manager, lasting thirteen years from 1962 to 1975. All but three of the club's managers – Tom Mather, Norman Smith and Osvaldo Ardiles – have managed the club in the top-flight.

== Managerial history ==
From 1892 to 1929, the team was selected by a committee. It was represented by Frank Watt, who was appointed the club's secretary in 1895. Watt was responsible for the success the Edwardian Newcastle side had in the early 1900s, winning the First Division four times, the Northern League three times and were FA Cup finalists four times (although the team only won once, in 1910). The club's first official manager was Andy Cunningham, who was appointed in 1930, with Watt remaining secretary until 1935. Cunningham was on the club's books at the time as a striker, and initially began as a player-manager but retired the following year to become full-time manager of the club. He won the FA Cup in 1932, but the club was also relegated to the Second Division in the 1933–34 season. After failing to earn an immediate promotion back to the top-flight, Cunningham was replaced by Tom Mather, whose four years in charge saw Newcastle fail to mount a serious promotion challenge, and look more likely to fall into the Third Division North, with Mather resigning at the onset of World War II.

The late 1930s to mid 1950s were to be dominated by one man: Stan Seymour. Seymour played for Newcastle in the 1920s, and was often a crowd favourite. He left the club in acrimonious circumstances, but returned in 1938, as a director. Like Watt, he could not pick the team under the Director's Committee, but he had more influence on who could play (perhaps due to his stature). In 1947, he stepped down to allow George Martin to take over, but was back for a second spell in 1950 after Martin moved to Aston Villa, despite having steered the club to promotion and a series of strong First Division finishes. During Seymour's second spell, Newcastle won the FA Cup in consecutive years (1951 and 1952), and as a result, he became the first person in English football history to win the FA Cup with the same club as a player and manager. In 1954, Seymour would again step down to allow another man to take the helm, this time, it was Doug Livingstone. However, when the club reached the cup final in 1955, Livingstone attempted to drop Jackie Milburn, and Seymour, who was behind Milburn's successful trial, took affront to this and picked the cup final team by himself. Victory in the final meant for Seymour that he was right, and as a result, Livingstone was barred from any involvement with the first team, resigning the following year. Seymour took over for the third time, but in a cruel twist of fate, the club's form deteriorated rapidly under him, and they avoided relegation on goal difference. This was to be the final straw for chairman and boardroom rival William McKeag, and he appointed Charlie Mitten as Seymour's successor. He would remain on the board until his death in 1978. Despite a successful first few seasons in charge, Mitten's spell as manager culminated in Newcastle being relegated in 1961, and he was sacked later that year with the team struggling. Experienced trainer Norman Smith took over as manager for the remainder of the season and prevented a second consecutive relegation, but at 64 years old, Smith held no desire to occupy the manager's job on a long-term basis.

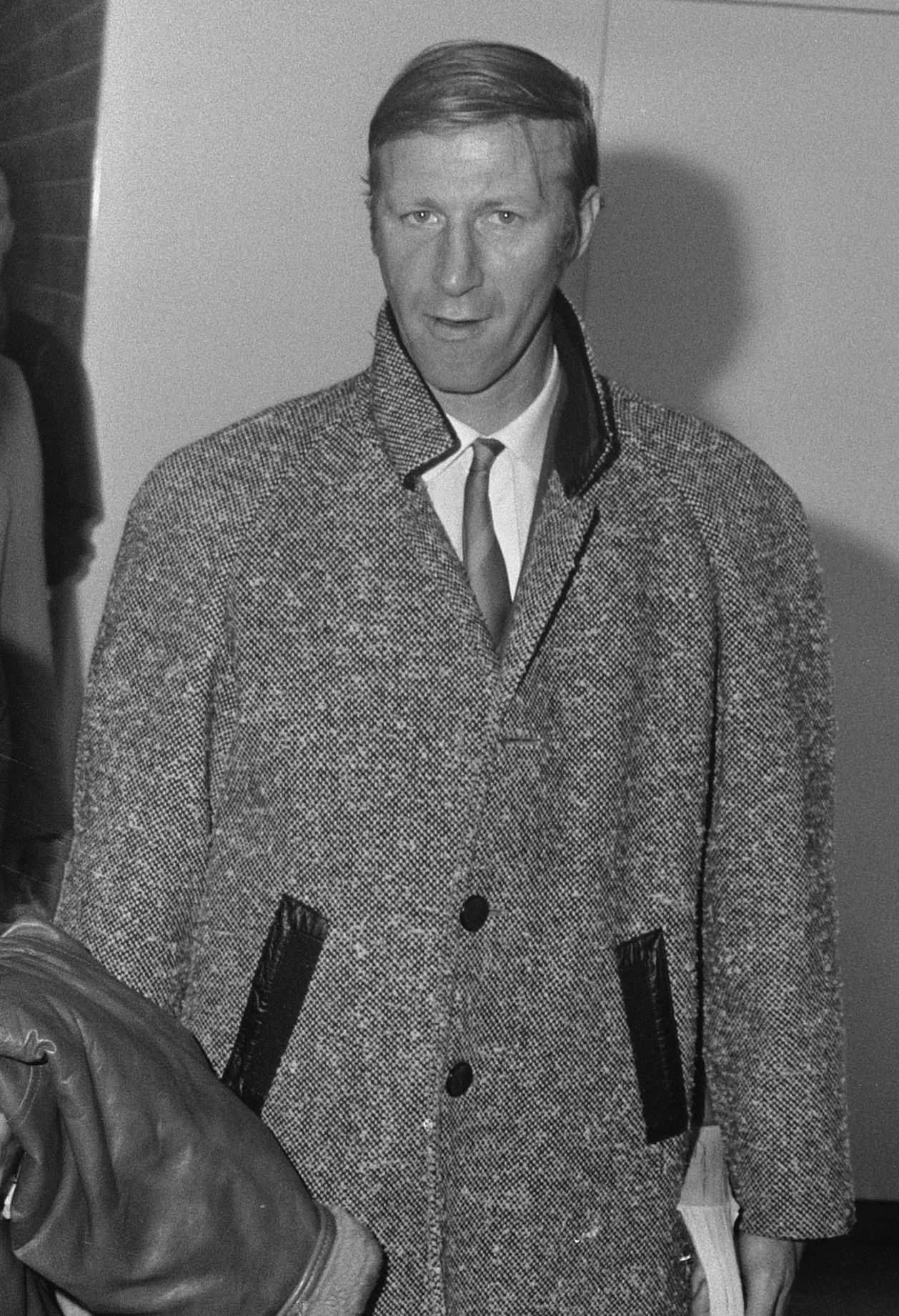
Jack Charlton (1935–2020), pictured here in 1969, managed the club from 1984 to 1985.

In the 1960s and up to the mid 1970s, Newcastle had a steady presence in Joe Harvey. Also a former player, having captained the club to FA Cup success the previous decade, the club were moderately successful under his tenureship. They were the Second Division champions in 1965, and won the Inter-Cities Fairs Cup Final in 1969, the last major silverware that the club won until 2025. He also brought in Malcolm Macdonald, Tony Green, Terry McDermott, Geoff Nulty and Micky Burns, all of whom at some point, made notable contributions to the club. Harvey resigned in 1975 after a poor season, and was replaced by Gordon Lee, whose first season saw another mediocre league campaign, albeit with a run to the final of the League Cup. Lee walked out on the club halfway through his second season in charge, leading to inexperienced coach Richard Dinnis being the surprise choice to replace him. Despite initially promising form and a 5th-place finish that saw qualification for the UEFA Cup, Dinnis' spell as manager ended in disaster, and he was sacked early in the following season after the club's worst-ever start to a league campaign. The more experienced Bill McGarry took over, but was powerless to prevent relegation, and left in 1980 after the next two seasons saw promising starts fizzle out into mid-table finishes. Former manager Joe Harvey briefly return as interim manager before Arthur Cox, with whom Harvey had a close friendship, was named manager, and would hold that position for the next four years. Cox steered the club back into the top-flight in 1984, but a fall-out with chairman Stan Seymour Jr. (son of the former manager) saw Cox make the shock move of dropping down two divisions to take over at newly relegated Derby County.

Following Cox's departure, Jack Charlton took over as manager, having been persuaded to do so by Milburn, his maternal uncle. Although Newcastle had just been promoted to the First Division, club captain Kevin Keegan announced his retirement and McDermott, in his second stint at the club, was released. With a lack of funding from the board, Charlton had little choice to promote youth team players Peter Beardsley, Chris Waddle and later, Paul Gascoigne. The club finished the season in fourteenth place, but Charlton resigned over the departure of Waddle and the failure to sign Eric Gates. Willie McFaul returned as caretaker manager, and was given the job on a permanent basis after a 1–0 win over Liverpool. McFaul decided early on to build the team around Gascoigne, who would go on to score nine goals. The club finished in a respectable eleventh place. However, the 1986–87 season started badly, and they were bottom of the table by November. McFaul signed Paul Goddard, who became the club's record signing. Goddard and Gascoigne teamed up well together, with the former equalling a club record of scoring in seven straight games, and the club finished in seventeenth place. Beardsley was sold to Liverpool on the eve of the 1987–88 season, but this was to be Gascoigne's breakthrough season for the club, winning the PFA Young Player of the Year award as Newcastle ended the season in eighth place. He, along with Goddard and Neil McDonald, were sold on, and without players of that calibre, the club's form suffered and McFaul was sacked. His successor, Jim Smith, could not prevent the club from finishing bottom of the league, but did stay on and finished third in the Second Division, qualifying for the play-offs. Newcastle faced their local rivals Sunderland, losing 2–0 over the two legs. Smith resigned the following year, with the club stuck in mid-table.

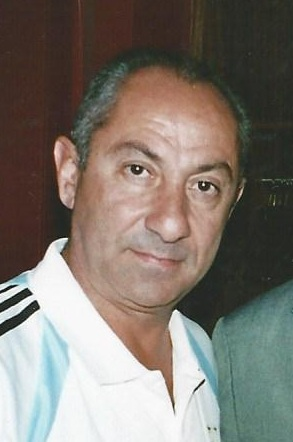
Osvaldo Ardiles, pictured here in 2006, managed the club from 1991 to 1992.

In 1991, Osvaldo Ardiles was appointed manager; he was the first foreign-born manager of the club. He set about dismantling Smith's team, focusing on promoting the younger players, and steered the club to eleventh place. However, in the 1991–92 season, Ardiles struggled to deliver results in what was the club's centenary year, and as the club found itself in a relegation battle, with a real risk of dropping down to the Third Division, he was replaced in the role by Keegan. The club stayed up on the last day of the season, with a 2–1 win over Leicester City. As the Premier League had been established, the Second Division was renamed the First Division, and Newcastle won the league, eight points ahead of West Ham United. The defence was strengthened by the signings of John Beresford and Barry Venison, and in February 1993, the strike force was bolstered by the arrival of Andy Cole, who scored twelve goals in his first twelve games for the club. In the summer of 1993, top scorer David Kelly was moved on, and Beardsley returned to the club, having spent the previous two seasons at Everton. Gavin Peacock also left the club, he was replaced by Rob Lee, who had joined in the autumn transfer window. Newcastle ended the 1993–94 season in third place, their highest league finish since 1927, and with Cole the top goalscorer. This team was the precursor to the Entertainers side two seasons later. In the 1994–95 season, the best start to any top division season in their history, winning their first six games to go top of the table. They had fallen away by Christmas but were in the running for a UEFA Cup place. The sale of Cole to Manchester United in the new year, affected their firepower up front and the club finished sixth, but made important summer signings in Les Ferdinand and David Ginola.

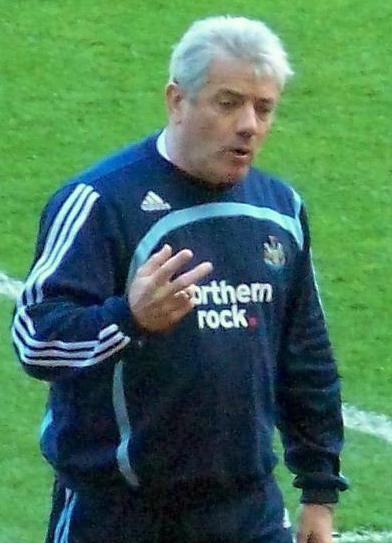
Kevin Keegan, pictured here in 2008, had two spells at the club; from 1992 to 1997, and in 2008.

In the 1995–96 season, Newcastle challenged Manchester United for the title. Their brand of football was thrilling in its reckless abandon, an infamous example of this is the 1996 match with Liverpool, which finished 4–3 to the Merseysiders. During this period, the team were dubbed the Entertainers. Newcastle had led the way from August until mid-March, and were at one point, ahead of Manchester United by twelve points. With two games to go, and after a win over Leeds United, Keegan rose to Alex Ferguson's baiting in an iconic post-match interview declaring, "...and I'll tell you, honestly, I will love it if we beat them. Love it." However, Newcastle squandered their game in hand by drawing with Nottingham Forest, and then drawing with Tottenham Hotspur, whereas Manchester United comfortably beat Middlesbrough to regain the Premier League title. Reasons given for Newcastle's capitulation include three consecutive away losses to Arsenal, Liverpool and Blackburn Rovers, and the mid-season purchase of David Batty, who was shoehorned into a side that had been playing well and now had to consolidate him. Keegan responded to the previous season's disappointment, by breaking the world transfer record to sign Alan Shearer from Blackburn Rovers. Newcastle mounted another title challenge, and won seven matches in a row to go top of the table. However, soon after that they also went seven matches without a win, and although the team had emphatic wins over Tottenham Hotspur and Leeds United, Keegan felt he had taken the club as far as he could, resigning in January 1997.

Keegan's replacement was Kenny Dalglish, who came out of retirement to take the job. The club were in fourth place at the time of Keegan's departure, and remained there for several weeks, until they once again finished runners-up to Manchester United, having a better goal difference than Arsenal and Liverpool, who ended the season on the same number of points. The club also qualified for the Champions League for the first time, as UEFA allowed the runners-up of top European leagues to compete in the competition. Over the course of the 1997–98 season, several members of the Entertainers left the club, including Ginola and Ferdinand to Tottenham Hotspur, and Beardsley to Bolton Wanderers. Although Dalglish brought in Shay Given, Temuri Ketsbaia and Gary Speed, he also recruited Stuart Pearce, John Barnes and Ian Rush, all of whom were in their mid to late thirties, and was criticised by supporters for doing so. When Shearer sustained an ankle injury that kept him out of action for half the season, Dalglish turned to Faustino Asprilla as his first choice striker. In their opening Champions League group stage match, Newcastle recorded a famous victory over Barcelona as Asprilla scored a hat-trick, but would finish third in the group behind Dynamo Kyiv and PSV Eindhoven. In January 1998, Asprilla would leave the club to rejoin Parma, with Newcastle struggling in the league. The club would eventually finish thirteenth, and compared to Keegan's style of football, under Dalglish, it was greatly unpopular. Despite this, Newcastle did reach the cup final, but lost against Premier League winners Arsenal. As the Gunners had won the double, Newcastle qualified for the last ever UEFA Cup Winners' Cup. After two draws at the start of the 1998–99 season, Dalglish was sacked by chairman Freddy Shepherd, and was replaced on the same day by Ruud Gullit.

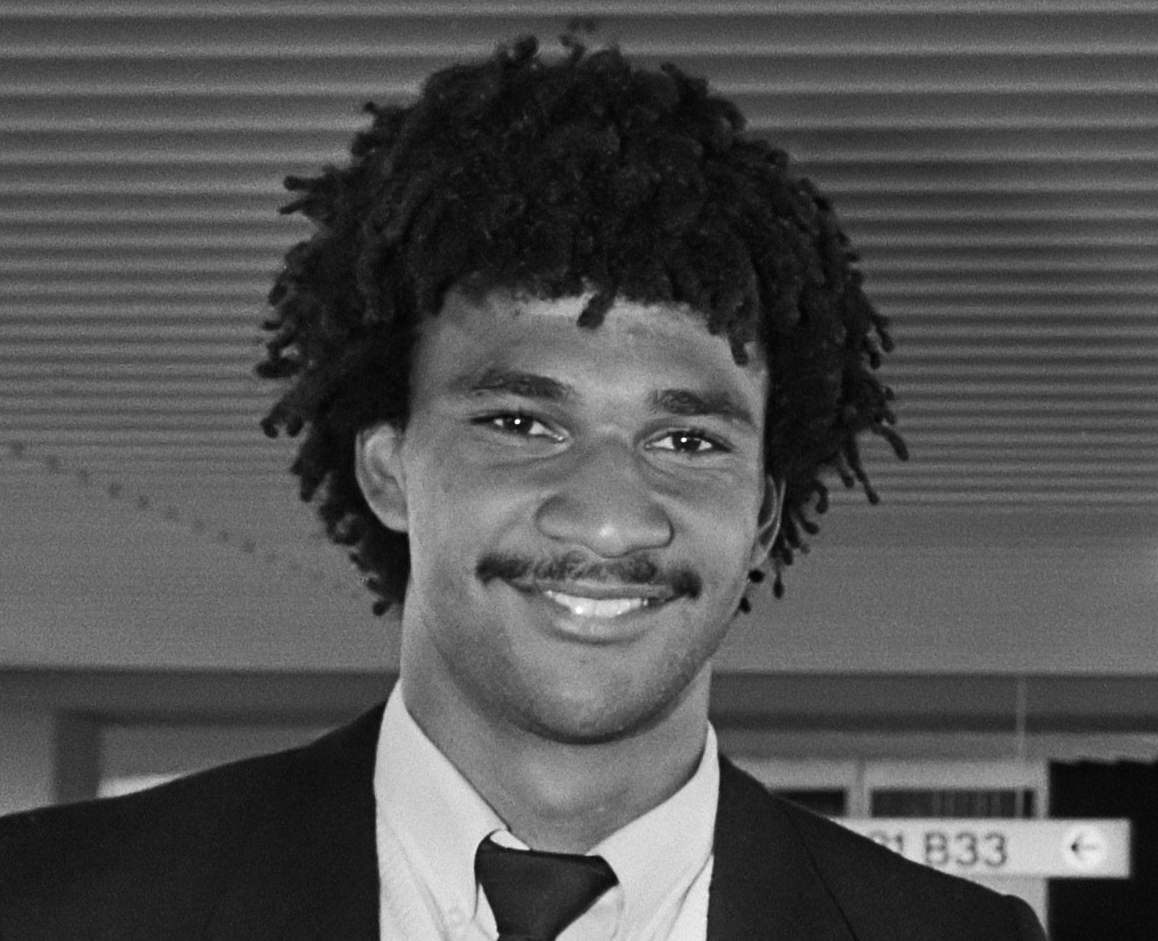
Ruud Gullit, pictured here in 1983, managed the club from 1998 to 1999.

Gullit's first challenge as Newcastle manager came in the Cup Winners' Cup, in the first round against Partizan; the Magpies would lose over two legs on away goals. Gullit had a major public spat with Lee, and in an attempt to appear in control, stripped him of the club captaincy, did not give him a shirt number and made him train with the reserves. He also froze out Pearce and Barnes, who both assert in their autobiographies that the Dutchman felt threatened by the senior players in the squad, and a possible threat to the manager's position should it arise. Like the previous season, Newcastle finished thirteenth and would reach the cup final, only to lose to Manchester United. Because the Mancunians had already qualified for the Champions League, Newcastle qualified for the UEFA Cup. Gullit also had misunderstood the importance of the Tyne–Wear derby, claiming it was inferior to the Milan derby. It was this attitude that would be his downfall, and after a poor start to the 1999–2000 season, in which Newcastle had yet to win a match, he benched Shearer and Duncan Ferguson, in the 2–1 defeat to Sunderland. Gullit resigned after this match, citing the media's harassment of his family in the Netherlands, rather than the club's form. Steve Clarke was caretaker manager for the next two matches, until the club appointed Bobby Robson. When Dalglish was sacked, Robson had been first choice to take over as manager, but he was two months into his job at PSV, and so could not join his hometown club. In his first match as Newcastle manager, the club thrashed Sheffield Wednesday 8–0, and while they spent the rest of the season in mid-table, finishing eleventh, Robson had done his job which was to keep Newcastle in the Premier League.

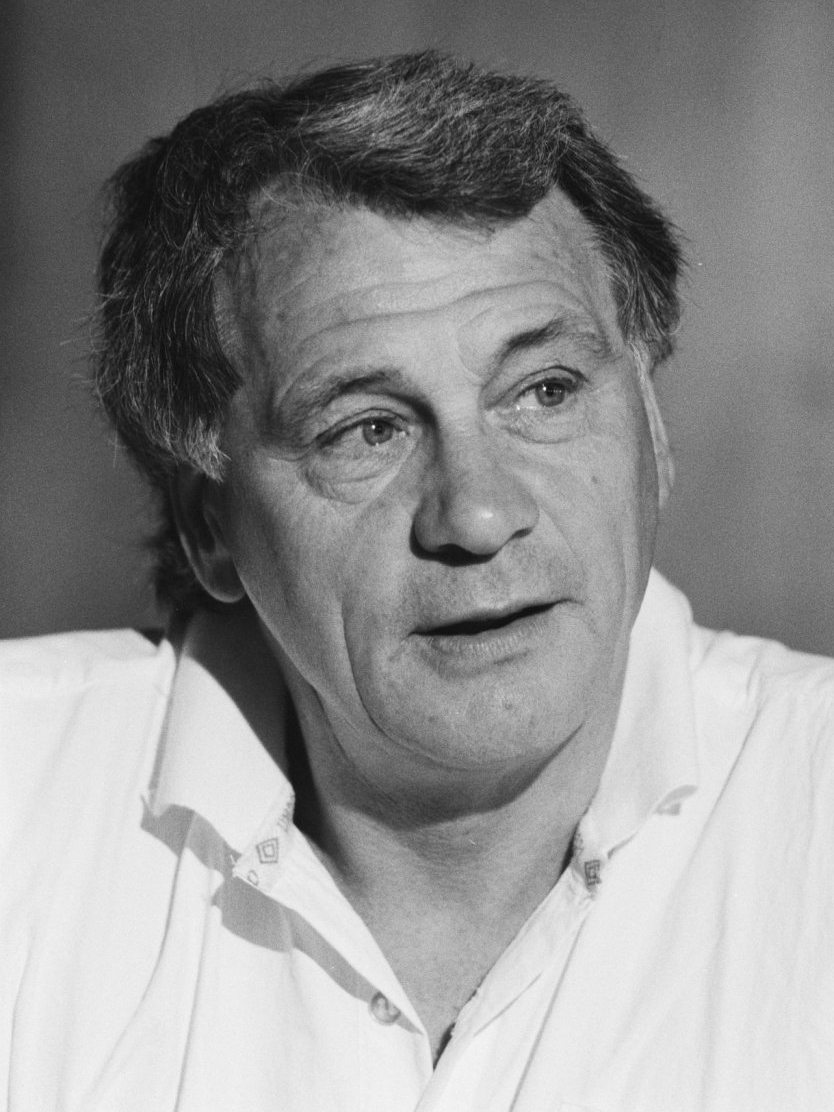
Bobby Robson, pictured here in 1988, managed the club from 1999 to 2004.

Robson's first full season as Newcastle manager saw them finish eleventh once again – more than high enough to avoid relegation, but not quite high enough to get into Europe. In the 2001–02 season, the Magpies participated in the 2001 UEFA Intertoto Cup, and were co-finalists, but due to the away goals rule, their opponents Troyes qualified for that season's UEFA Cup. Robson decided to base the team around youth, bringing in players such as Craig Bellamy and Laurent Robert, as well as Kieron Dyer, who was signed by Robson's predecessor, Gullit. Newcastle found themselves in an unlikely title challenge, however, they fell short and finished fourth, qualifying for the next season's Champions League. They would beat Željezničar 5–0 over two legs, and were placed in the first group stage against Dynamo Kyiv, Feyenoord and Juventus. With three losses in their first three matches, Newcastle were bottom of the group, but would make a comeback, beating Juve 1–0, Dynamo 2–1 and finally, a 3–2 win over Feyenoord; Bellamy scoring the winner in the last minute. In the second group stage, they were placed with Internazionale, Barcelona and Bayer Leverkusen. Again, the club started badly with losses against Inter and Barcelona, with Bellamy sent off against the former opponents and had to serve a three-match ban. The club would then beat Leverkusen 3–1 home and away, and thus were back in contention to qualify for the knockout stage. They drew with Inter away, but would lose their final match to Barcelona. By this time, Newcastle were in another title challenge. They had started the season badly, only winning once in their first five matches, and then quickly refound their form. The January transfer window signing of Jonathan Woodgate strengthened the defence, and by March, they were in with a good chance of winning the Premier League. Four losses between March and April, including a 6–2 home defeat to eventual champions Manchester United, put paid to that. Afterwards, Robson's side would be unbeaten for the final four matches, and finished third, behind Manchester United and Arsenal.

In the 2003–04 season, Newcastle failed to advance to the Champions League proper, losing to Partizan via a penalty shootout. In the league, Robson's side failed to win a match until October, although they would win every match that month. Newcastle's away form was cause for concern, and in most cases, an inability to hold onto a 1–0 lead cost them dearly. They would only win twice away, and registered twelve draws. In the final matches of the season, Newcastle were in a race to finish fourth, alongside Liverpool. A 3–3 draw with Southampton, their final game in hand, allowed the Merseysiders to take advantage and move above the Magpies. In the UEFA Cup, Newcastle made the semi-finals to face Marseille, but after a spirited goalless draw at St James' Park, the club lost 2–0 at the Stade Vélodrome, and their chance of reaching their first final since 1999 was over. Newcastle finished the season in fifth place, qualifying for the UEFA Cup. The club would have an indifferent start to the season; their first four matches ended in two draws and two losses, with the team again letting leads slip, this time against Middlesbrough and Norwich City. This form and the fact Robson was perceived to have lost the dressing room (Dyer being named as a substitute for refusing to play on the wing against Boro was a notable example), gave Shepherd no choice but to sack him. The relationship between Robson and the hierarchy had been fractured already, due to the summer signing of Patrick Kluivert, and the futile pursuit of Wayne Rooney. Robson was given a £1 million severance payment by the club; it was to be his last managerial role in football.

Robson's successor was Graeme Souness, who was seen as a disciplinarian. The club would go on a ten match unbeaten run in all competitions, beginning with a first round tie against Bnei Sakhnin, but their form would dip soon afterwards. Souness also fell out with Bellamy, after the striker was benched when he refused to play out of position in a match against Arsenal, and was later loaned out to Celtic. He was also reported to have fallen out with Robert, Olivier Bernard and Jermaine Jenas. Injuries often plagued Souness's tenure at the club, the league form suffered because of it (and with Shearer out of action, some fans questioned if Bellamy's departure was the right decision), the exit from the UEFA Cup quarter-final and the FA Cup semi-final were also blamed on squad members unable to play. Souness's side finished in fourteenth place, and a rift was starting to begin between him and Shepherd. His main gripe was over the state of the club's training ground, which had caused many injuries over the course of the season. The club could have qualified for Europe via the 2005 UEFA Intertoto Cup, but lost the semi-final to Deportivo. Souness decided to break Newcastle's transfer record to sign Michael Owen, who had spent the previous season with Real Madrid. Owen was partnered up front with Shearer, the previous holder of the transfer record, and the two had a good start together, until Owen broke his metatarsal in a collision with Tottenham Hotspur's Paul Robinson, ruling him out until April 2006 and a serious doubt for the 2006 FIFA World Cup. From December 2005 to February 2006, Newcastle failed to win a match, and he was sacked, with the Youth Academy Director Glenn Roeder taking over on a caretaker basis. Souness's time on Tyneside was not only compounded by injuries, but also poor singings (including the much maligned Jean-Alain Boumsong, a free transfer the previous summer, but was bought by the Scotsman for £8 million) and the lack of acceptance from the supporters.

Roeder steered the club to seventh place, qualifying for the Intertoto Cup, and was handed a two-year contract by Shepherd at the end of the season. Shearer was appointed as player-assistant, and broke Newcastle's all-time scoring record in Roeder's first match in charge. However, his season, and ultimately, career was ended by an injury sustained in the Tyne–Wear derby. In the summer, Roeder brought in Obafemi Martins as his replacement. In that year's Intertoto Cup, Newcastle comfortably beat Lillestrøm over two legs, to qualify for the 2006–07 UEFA Cup with ten other teams. Looking for a new assistant, Roeder turned to Kevin Bond, but after assertions in a Panorama documentary that he had taken bungs, Bond resigned and Nigel Pearson arrived. Under Roeder, the club would go eight matches without a win, but then the club would win five matches out of six. Not for the first time, Newcastle's form was wildly inconsistent, and with a number of first team players injured, Roeder had to rely on the players he knew from his time as Youth Academy Director. By March 2007, the club went out of the UEFA Cup to AZ on away goals, having been outplayed and outthought by Louis van Gaal's side. In the league, they were also struggling, and after only winning once in eight, Roeder resigned as manager in May. Pearson took charge of the last match of the season, a 1–1 draw with relegated Watford. Two days later, Sam Allardyce was named manager; he had previously been approached by the club the year before, but they went with Roeder.

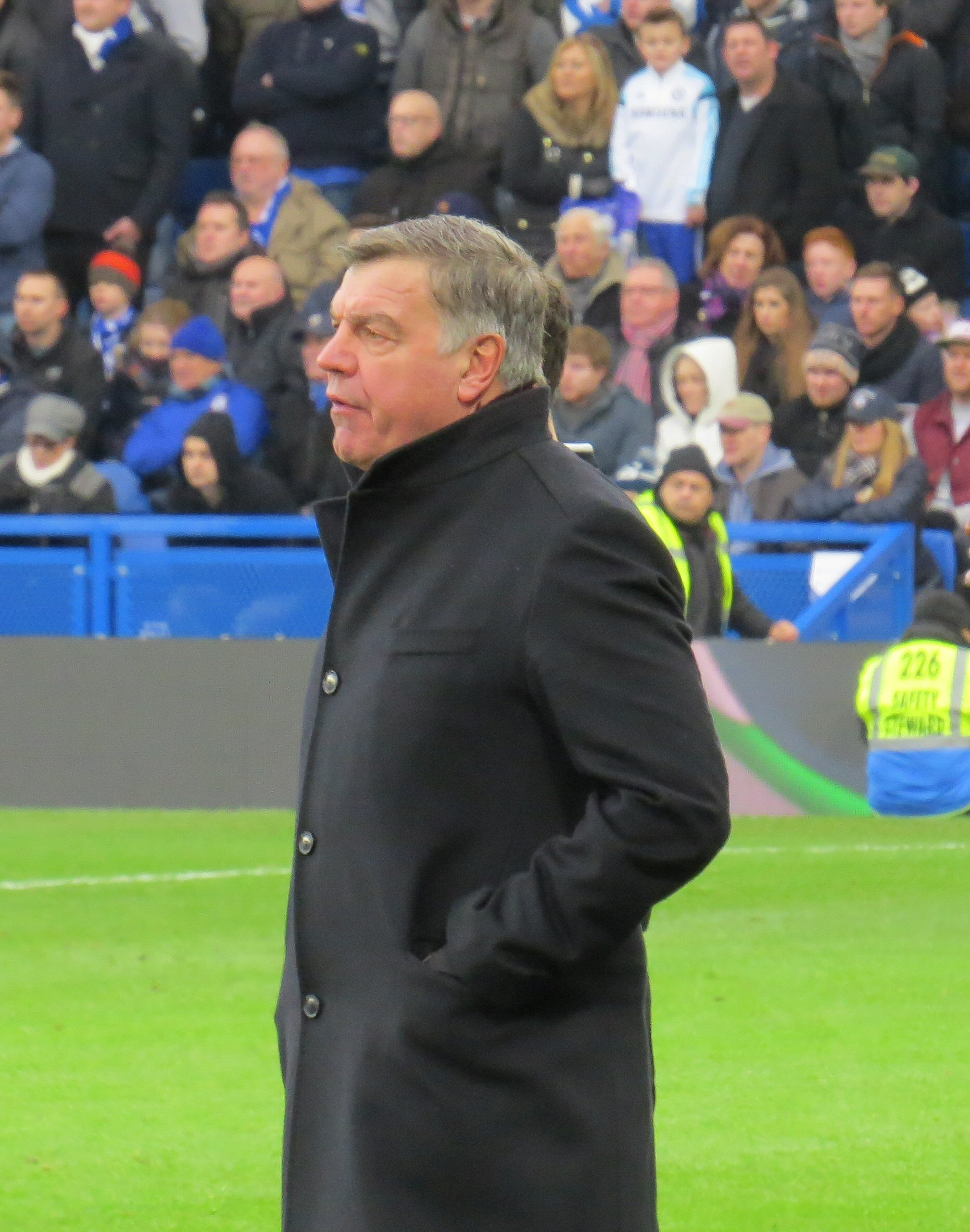
Sam Allardyce, pictured here in 2014, managed the club from 2007 to 2008.

In the weeks that followed, Newcastle underwent a change in ownership, as Mike Ashley bought out shares in the club, and in July, he was able to buy the club outright. Ashley, however, decided not to rock the boat so soon with Allardyce, and allowed him to make changes within the squad, with club captain Scott Parker and Dyer allowed to leave, and several new signings arrived, including the notorious Joey Barton. Under Allardyce, the club started off well, but were also the only club to lose to Derby and went 3–0 down at home to Portsmouth after eleven minutes, with summer signing Caçapa hauled off after eighteen. Like previous seasons, the club suffered from wildly inconsistent form, they did not win a match from late October to mid December, and over the Christmas period and into the New Year, they lost three successive matches; Allardyce's final match in charge was a 2–0 home loss to Manchester City. Allardyce left in January 2008, by mutual consent. He had expected to be told that the club were signing a new player, but Ashley and Chris Mort told him that Keegan, out of work since leaving Manchester City three years earlier, was to be announced as his successor.

Keegan's return to the club was greeted with much fanfare, and the team made a positive start with a comfortable win over Stoke City in an FA Cup third-round replay. However, they were out of the FA Cup two weeks later, in a 3–0 loss to Arsenal. Earlier that day, the appointments of Dennis Wise as Executive Director of Football, Tony Jimenez as Vice President of Player Recruitment and Jeff Vetere as Technical Co-ordinator were announced. These men were to become very controversial to manager and fans alike. In the league, things were not much better, as they failed to win a match until March, but still bettered the previous season's finish by one place. In the summer transfer window, Keegan brought in Argentine internationals Fabricio Coloccini and Jonás Gutiérrez, but the club were unable to keep James Milner, as he left to join Aston Villa. Milner's departure already caused conflict between Keegan and the board, but on transfer deadline day, two players that he was not aware of, Xisco and Nacho González arrived at the club, with the former player paraded at St. James' by Wise. Keegan once again resigned as manager, citing a lack of control in transfers and boardroom interference. Fans were furious over his exit, and thus, their anger was directed at Ashley and his advisors, a feeling that never truly went away under the Londoner's ownership of the club. Ashley would put Newcastle up for sale in the wake of Keegan's exit, but no one came close to what he was asking.

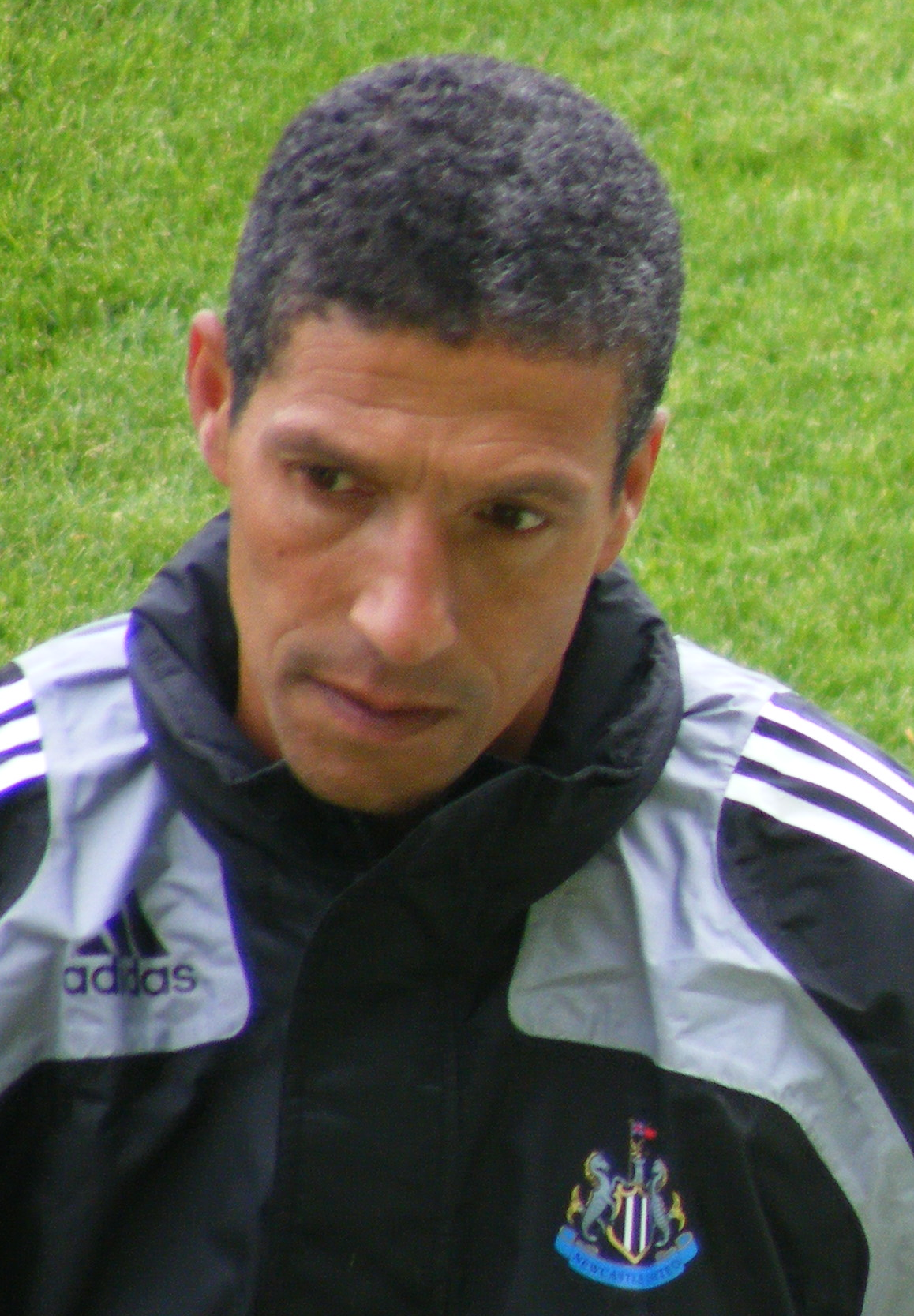
Chris Hughton, pictured here in 2008, managed the club from 2009 to 2010, with caretaker spells in 2008 and 2009.

Newcastle would then go through the most turbulent season in their recent history. Chris Hughton was made caretaker manager until a replacement could be found, even though results were worsening under the Irishman, they lost all their matches and went out of the League Cup to Tottenham Hotspur. Towards the end of September, Joe Kinnear, who four years previous was in charge of Nottingham Forest, was made interim manager. Kinnear's first media conference was an explicit one, and the Daily Mirror's Simon Bird was infamously singled out. After this, Hughton was put in charge of the national interviews, with Kinnear handling the local media. Results still didn't get any better, with the club in the relegation zone, further misery was compounded when they lost the Tyne–Wear derby for the first time in twenty-eight years. Kinnear's job title was uncertain; it initially appeared that there might be a permanent successor to Keegan, but as the weeks went on, this was becoming more and more uncertain. Finally, Kinnear signed a contract with the club until the end of the season. In the January transfer window, Kinnear signed Kevin Nolan, Peter Løvenkrands and Ryan Taylor, all of whom would make significant contributions the following season. However, he would also fall out with Charles N'Zogbia, who was reportedly angered by Kinnear's mispronunciation of his name. N'Zogbia left to join Wigan Athletic in a swap deal, which saw Taylor arrive at St James'. When Kinnear felt unwell before a match against West Bromwich Albion, Hughton would again take charge and guided the club to their first win in two months. From then on, Hughton was named as acting manager until Kinnear's return, although it was unclear when exactly this would be, as he had triple heart bypass surgery. But Hughton could not stop the slide, failing to win any of Newcastle's four league matches in March, and in April, Shearer was appointed interim manager until the end of the season. Shearer's inexperience as a manager was laid bare: in the eight matches he had to save the club, he only managed one win – in the Tyne–Tees derby. Indiscipline also did not help, as Newcastle finished each of the last four games of the season with ten men; Shearer notably fell out with Barton after a rash tackle on Liverpool's Xabi Alonso. Newcastle travelled to Aston Villa on the final day of the season needing a win to stay up, but a Damien Duff own goal saw Newcastle succumb to defeat and end their sixteen-year stay in the Premier League.

The club began the next season with being up for sale and Hughton remaining as caretaker. As it transpired, Ashley was unable to find a buyer willing to meet his asking price of £80 million, and Hughton was confirmed as permanent manager in October. Despite the exodus of star players like Owen, Duff, and Martins, the squad rallied under Hughton to win the Championship title with 102 points, the first time the club had broken the 100-point mark. Newcastle's form was inconsistent upon their return, with results like a 6–0 home victory over Aston Villa and a 4–3 victory at Chelsea (in the League Cup), balanced out by embarrassing home defeats against Blackpool and Blackburn Rovers. Nonetheless, it was still a shock to fans and pundits alike when Hughton was sacked on 6 December, the board citing the desire for a manager with more managerial experience. Hughton's successor was Alan Pardew, most recently of League One club Southampton. Despite star striker Andy Carroll leaving for Liverpool in a club record £35 million sale on the last day of the January transfer window, Pardew secured safety with victory over Birmingham early in May.

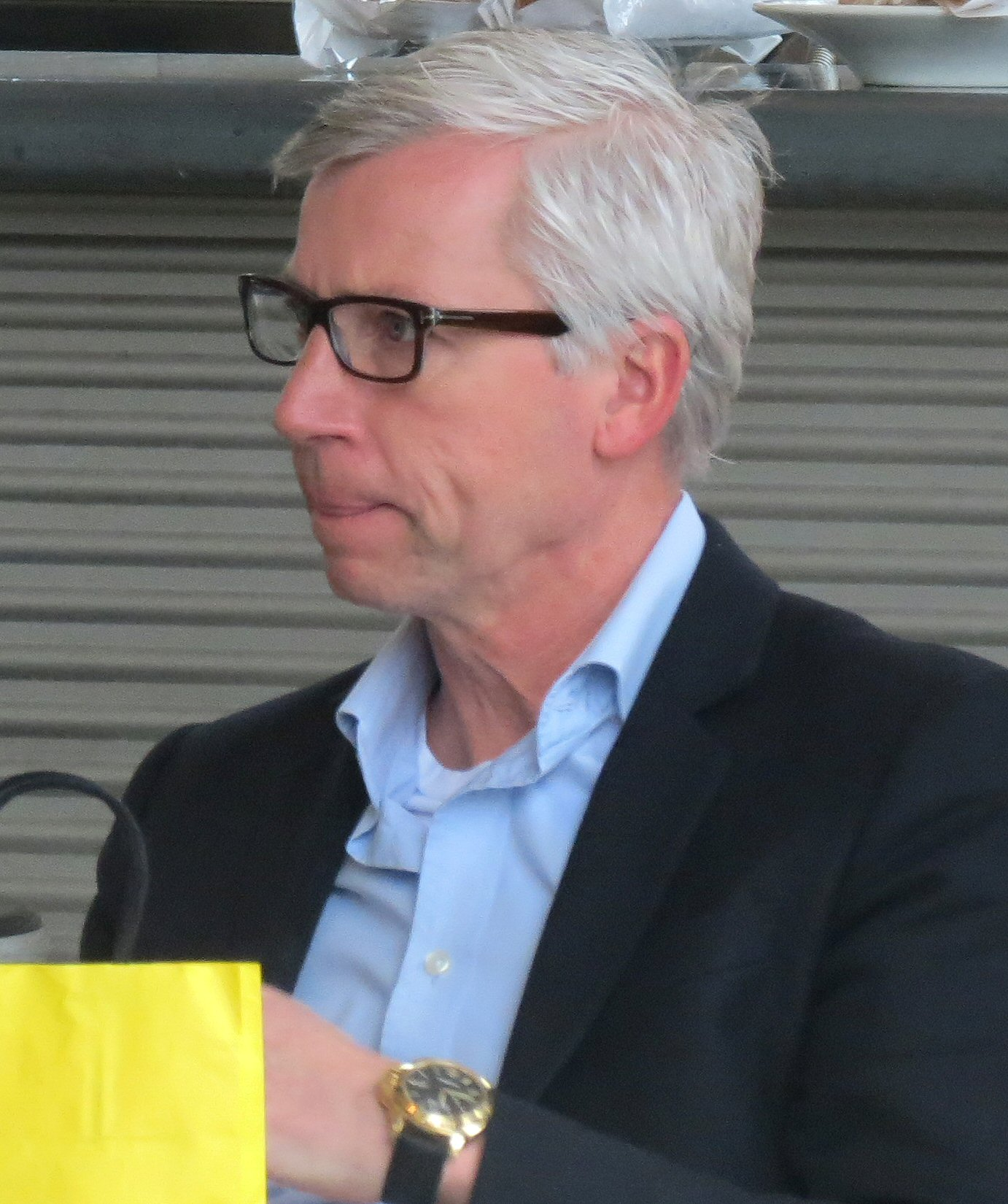
Alan Pardew, pictured here in 2012, managed the club from 2010 to 2014.

Although key players like Barton, Kevin Nolan and José Enrique left the club during the summer, the likes of Yohan Cabaye and Davide Santon were signed to replace them, and the club's strikeforce was augmented by the signing of West Ham United's Senegalese international Demba Ba. Ba would score fifteen league goals by January as the club made a shock run for European qualification, peaking at third in November after an eleven-game unbeaten run to start the season. Ba's countryman Papiss Cissé was signed from Freiburg to reinforce the front line, and he contributed thirteen goals in fourteen games as Newcastle finished the season in fifth, their highest league placing since the Bobby Robson era. The club had been placed fourth with four games left to play and had had a great chance to seal the last Champions League place, but lost three of those four games to be leapfrogged by Tottenham Hotspur (this would ultimately be a moot point, as sixth-placed Chelsea was awarded England's fourth Champions League berth as reigning European champions).

Finishing fifth saw Newcastle qualify for the play-off rounds of the Europa League (the rebranded UEFA Cup), but the club failed to adequately prepare for the European campaign, with Dutch midfielder Vurnon Anita the only major signing over the summer. Although Newcastle secured progression from the Europa League group stages, a poor return of three league wins between November and January saw Newcastle in a relegation crisis, and the management responded by signing five French players from Ligue 1 in January – defenders Mathieu Debuchy, Mapou Yanga-Mbiwa, and Massadio Haïdara, midfielder Moussa Sissoko, and forward Yoan Gouffran. Newcastle reached the Europa League quarter-finals before being eliminated by eventual runners-up Benfica, but a final sixteenth-place finish was less satisfactory. The following season saw a second summer of transfer inactivity, with French striker Loïc Rémy's arrival on loan from Queens Park Rangers being the only major signing, but Rémy's goals fired the club to a comfortable eighth place as 2013 ended. However, the club's form slumped after the sale of Cabaye to Paris Saint-Germain, and only five of the club's last nineteen games were won, the low point being a run of six consecutive losses, with Newcastle ultimately finishing in tenth.

The 2014 summer transfer window saw more activity at St James', with World Cup stars Rémy Cabella and Daryl Janmaat arriving to partner young talents like Ayoze Pérez. The season started poorly with the club failing to win any of their first seven games, though the team did go on to win their next five games while only conceding one goal. That was as good as it got for the Magpies and there was little love lost between the fans and Pardew when he left on 29 December to take charge at Crystal Palace. Assistant manager John Carver was named caretaker, and oversaw some of the worst form in the club's history, including an eight-game losing run between March and May; survival was only achieved on the last day of the season, with a 2–0 home win over West Ham United. Carver was sacked at the season's conclusion, and Steve McClaren was appointed as his successor. McClaren would spend over £80 million in his brief stay, with Georginio Wijnaldum, Aleksandar Mitrović, Florian Thauvin, Jonjo Shelvey and Andros Townsend all arriving in the North East for eight-figure transfer fees. Despite this spending, the club's form was catastrophic and McClaren was sacked early in March with the team in nineteenth, having finished all but eight of the past twenty-eight matchdays in the relegation zone. Rafael Benítez, formerly of Liverpool, Chelsea and Real Madrid, was appointed as a last roll of the dice, and although he led the club to finish the season with a six-game unbeaten run (culminating in a 5–1 victory over third-placed Tottenham Hotspur), victory for rivals Sunderland in their penultimate game of the season saw Newcastle relegated yet again.

Due to the overwhelming support for Benítez on the final day of the season, the Spaniard decided to stay at the club. His stature in football was seen as a reason Dwight Gayle and Matt Ritchie dropped down a division to play for the club, but he was unable to prevent the departures of Townsend, Wijnaldum and Sissoko. Newcastle started the season in inconspicuous circumstances, losing to Fulham and Huddersfield Town, but five wins in a row saw them go head to head with Huddersfield. From the end of September to mid-November, they won nine matches in a row (equalling that of Keegan's team in 1994). However, a home loss to Blackburn Rovers ended that run. In the new year, the club did not manage to achieve a winning run like earlier in the season, although they were unbeaten from mid-January to mid-March. By this time, Huddersfield's title challenge had fallen away, and Brighton & Hove Albion's consistent form home and away saw them and Newcastle trade first and second places over the course of the season. Brighton's form collapsed after promotion was assured for the Seasiders, despite being seven points ahead of the Magpies, who themselves were promoted a week later. After beating Cardiff City (and in doing so, record fourteen away wins; a post-war record), Newcastle were a point behind Brighton going into the final day of the season. The club won the Championship, comfortably beating Barnsley 3–0, and helped massively due to Aston Villa's Jack Grealish scoring the equaliser against Brighton at Villa Park.

== Statistics ==
Information correct as of match played 30 July 2026. Only competitive matches are counted.

- (n/a) = Information not available

Manager	Nationality	From	To	M	W	D	L	Win% (Note: Win% is rounded to two decimal places)	Honours
Frank Watt	Scotland	1892	31 December 1929	1,264	575	269	420	45.49	First Division champions: 1904–05, 1906–07, 1908–09, 1926–27; Second Division runners-up: 1897–98; Northern League champions: 1902–03, 1903–04, 1904–05; FA Cup winners: 1910, 1924 runners-up: 1905, 1906, 1908, 1911; FA Charity Shield winners: 1909; Sheriff of London Charity Shield winners: 1907
Andy Cunningham	Scotland	9 January 1930	31 May 1935	251	105	45	101	41.83	FA Cup winners: 1932; Charity Shield runners-up: 1932
Tom Mather	England	5 June 1935	1 September 1939	179	78	32	69	43.58	
Stan Seymour (Note: Seymour's managerial statistics cover all three stints in charge of Newcastle.)	England	1 September 1939	13 June 1958	338	130	74	134	38.46	FA Cup winners: 1951, 1952
George Martin	Scotland	20 May 1947	14 December 1950	155	76	40	39	49.03	Second Division runners-up: 1947–48, Charity Shield runners-up: 1951, 1952
Doug Livingstone	Scotland	10 December 1954	29 January 1956	99	43	20	36	43.43	FA Cup winners: 1955; Charity Shield runners-up: 1955
Charlie Mitten	England	13 June 1958	18 October 1961	145	53	28	64	36.55	
Norman Smith	England	18 October 1961	1 June 1962	35	12	8	15	34.29	
Joe Harvey	England	1 June 1962	11 June 1975	591	224	152	215	37.90	Second Division champions: 1964–65; FA Cup runners-up: 1974, Inter-Cities Fairs Cup winners: 1969; Anglo-Italian Cup winners: 1973; Texaco Cup Winners: 1974, 1975
Gordon Lee	England	12 June 1975	30 January 1977	74	28	20	26	37.84	Football League Cup runners-up: 1976
Richard Dinnis	England	2 February 1977	9 November 1977	40	12	10	18	30.00	
Willie McFaul (Note: Served as caretaker manager.)	Northern Ireland	9 November 1977	18 November 1977	1	0	0	1	0.00	
Bill McGarry	England	18 November 1977	31 August 1980	118	37	33	48	31.36	
Joe Harvey	England	31 August 1980	7 September 1980	3	2	1	0	66.67	
Arthur Cox	England	7 September 1980	24 May 1984	169	76	42	51	44.97	Kirin Cup winners: 1983
Jack Charlton	England	14 August 1984	10 August 1985	48	15	15	18	31.25	
Willie McFaul	Northern Ireland	12 August 1985	10 October 1988	149	52	41	56	34.90	
Colin Suggett	England	10 October 1988	14 December 1988	9	2	2	5	22.22	
Jim Smith	England	14 December 1988	21 March 1991	121	44	38	39	36.36	
Bobby Saxton	England	21 March 1991	26 March 1991	1	0	1	0	0.00	
Osvaldo Ardiles	Argentina	26 March 1991	5 February 1992	47	10	18	19	21.28	
Kevin Keegan	England	5 February 1992	8 January 1997	251	138	51	62	54.98	Premier League runners-up: 1995–96; First Division champions: 1992–93; Charity Shield runners-up: 1996
Terry McDermott	England	8 January 1997	14 January 1997	1	0	1	0	0.00	
Kenny Dalglish	Scotland	14 January 1997	27 August 1998	78	30	26	22	38.46	Premier League runners-up: 1996–97, FA Cup runners-up: 1998
Ruud Gullit	Netherlands	27 August 1998	28 August 1999	52	18	14	20	34.62	FA Cup runners-up: 1999
Steve Clarke	Scotland	28 August 1999	2 September 1999	1	0	0	1	0.00	
Bobby Robson	England	2 September 1999	30 August 2004	255	119	64	72	46.67	
John Carver	England	11 September 2004	13 September 2004	1	1	0	0	100.00	
Graeme Souness	Scotland	13 September 2004	2 February 2006	87	39	19	29	44.83	
Glenn Roeder (Note: Position described as caretaker manager, until finally confirmed as manager on 16 May 2006.)	England	2 February 2006	6 May 2007	72	33	15	24	45.83	UEFA Intertoto Cup winners: 2006
Nigel Pearson	England	6 May 2007	15 May 2007	1	0	1	0	0.00	
Sam Allardyce	England	15 May 2007	9 January 2008	24	8	6	10	33.33	
Nigel Pearson	England	9 January 2008	16 January 2008	2	1	0	1	50.00	
Kevin Keegan	England	16 January 2008	4 September 2008	21	6	6	9	28.57	
Chris Hughton	Ireland	8 September 2008	28 September 2008	3	0	0	3	0.00	
Joe Kinnear	Ireland	29 September 2008	1 April 2009 (Note: On convalescent leave following heart bypass surgery in February 2009.)	18	4	8	6	22.22	
Chris Hughton (Note: Position described as "acting in regular manager's absence" from February 2009, until Kinnear returned from surgery. Replaced in April 2009 by Alan Shearer.)	Ireland	7 February 2009	1 April 2009	6	1	2	3	16.67	
Alan Shearer (Note: Appointed interim manager for the final eight games of the 2008–09 season.)	England	1 April 2009	24 May 2009	8	1	2	5	12.50	
Chris Hughton (Note: Position described as caretaker or interim manager from May 2009, until finally confirmed as manager on 27 October 2009.)	Ireland	24 May 2009	6 December 2010	64	38	11	15	59.38	Football League Championship winners: 2009–10
Alan Pardew	England	9 December 2010	30 December 2014	185	71	41	73	38.38	
John Carver (Note: Position described as caretaker manager from 1 January 2015, until confirmed as "temporary head coach" on 26 January 2015.)	England	1 January 2015	9 June 2015	20	3	4	13	15.00	
Steve McClaren	England	10 June 2015	11 March 2016	31	7	6	18	22.58	
Rafael Benítez	Spain	11 March 2016	30 June 2019	146	62	31	53	42.47	EFL Championship winners: 2016–17
Steve Bruce	England	17 July 2019	20 October 2021	97	28	28	41	28.87	
Graeme Jones	England	20 October 2021	8 November 2021	3	0	2	1	0.00	
Eddie Howe	England	8 November 2021	30 July 2026	231	112	48	71	48.48	EFL Cup winners: 2025 runners-up: 2023
Jason Tindall (Note: Served as interim manager, as Eddie Howe was hospitalised after contracting pneumonia.)	England	13 April 2025	19 April 2025	3	2	0	1	66.67	
Matthias Jaissle	Germany	5 August 2026	present	0	00	00	00	—	
