= 1984–85 Newcastle United F.C. season =

Newcastle United
1984–85 season
- Chairman: Stan Seymour, Jr.
- Manager: Jack Charlton
- Stadium: St James' Park
- First Division: 14th
- FA Cup: Third round
- League Cup: Third round
- Top goalscorer: League: All: Beardsley (17)
- Average home league attendance: 26,228
Home colours	Away colours

During the 1984–85 season, Newcastle United participated in the Football League First Division.

== Season synopsis ==
Newcastle started their first season back in the top flight under the leadership of World Cup winner Jack Charlton after previous manager Arthur Cox left in the close-season due to lack of funds from the board for squad strengthening. Hopes of success were high due to the emergence of local youngsters Chris Waddle, Peter Beardsley and Paul Gascoigne. Waddle and Beardsley had progressed into potential world class forwards under the management of Cox during the promotion campaign of the previous season, Waddle would win international recognition during the season before being sold to Spurs. Newcastle were now without the inspirational former England striker Kevin Keegan, who had retired from playing after the end of the promotion campaign.

After a great start the team slowly drifted down the table, trying to offset this Charlton brought in tall centre forwards George Reilly and Tony Cunningham and changed to a long ball style. Although never in danger of being relegated throughout the season, the team ended the season three points above the relegation zone.

== Regular side ==
Kevin Carr; Malcolm Brown, Jeff Clarke/John Anderson, Glenn Roeder, Wes Saunders/Kenny Wharton; Neil McDonald, David McCreery, Pat Heard, Kenny Wharton/Chris Waddle; Peter Beardsley and Chris Waddle/George Reilly

== Coaching staff ==
Position	Staff
Manager	(England) Jack Charlton
Assistant Manager	(Northern Ireland) Willie McFaul
Youth Team Coach	(England) Colin Suggett
