= 1987–88 Newcastle United F.C. season =

Newcastle United
1987–88 season
- Chairman: Stan Seymour, Jr.
- Manager: Willie McFaul
- Stadium: St James' Park
- First Division: 8th
- FA Cup: Fifth round proper
- League Cup: Third round
- Full Members Cup: Second round
- Top goalscorer: League: Michael O'Neill (12); All: Michael O'Neill; Mirandinha (13)
- Highest home attendance: 28,796 (vs Wimbledon)
- Lowest home attendance: 7,787 (25 November 1987 vs Shrewsbury Town, Full Members Cup)
- Average home league attendance: 21,059
| Home colours | Away colours | Third colours |

During the 1987–88 season, Newcastle United participated in the Football League First Division. Following the sale of star player Peter Beardsley to Liverpool for a club record fee of £1.9 million, manager Willie McFaul recruited the Brazilian international Mirandinha. With the Brazilian joining Paul Goddard and Paul Gascoigne, the team made a mediocre start to the season. Midfielder Glyn Hodges arrived from Wimbledon but only managed seven games in his 86-day stay, before heading back south. McFaul signed young Northern Irishman Michael O'Neill in the winter; hailed as a new George Best by some, the 18-year-old went on a run of 12 goals in 19 games that saw Newcastle finish 8th, their highest finish since being promoted back to the top flight.

== League table ==
| Pos | Team | Pld | W | D | L | GF | GA | GD | Pts | Qualification or relegation |
|---|---|---|---|---|---|---|---|---|---|---|
| 6 | Arsenal | 40 | 18 | 12 | 10 | 58 | 39 | +19 | 66 | Qualified for the Football League Centenary Trophy |
| 7 | Wimbledon (Note: Wimbledon would have qualified as FA Cup winners.) | 40 | 14 | 15 | 11 | 58 | 47 | +11 | 57 | Qualified for the Football League Centenary Trophy and disqualified from the European Cup Winners' Cup |
| 8 | Newcastle United | 40 | 14 | 14 | 12 | 55 | 53 | +2 | 56 | Qualified for the Football League Centenary Trophy |
| 9 | Luton Town (Note: Luton Town would have qualified as League Cup winners.) | 40 | 14 | 11 | 15 | 57 | 58 | −1 | 53 | Disqualified from the UEFA Cup |
| 10 | Coventry City | 40 | 13 | 14 | 13 | 46 | 53 | −7 | 53 | |

Source: World Football
Rules for classification: 1) Points; 2) Goal difference; 3) Goals scored

== Kit ==
English company Umbro remained Newcastle United's kit manufacturers for the eighth consecutive season, and introduced a new kit for the season. Greenall's Beers remained kit sponsors, although the "Beers" was dropped from the kit sponsorship.

== Appearances, goals and cards ==
(Substitute appearances in brackets)

| Pos. | Name | League | | FA Cup | | League Cup | | Simod Cup | | Total | |
| Pos. | Name | Apps | Goals | Apps | Goals | Apps | Goals | Apps | Goals | Apps | Goals |
|---|---|---|---|---|---|---|---|---|---|---|---|
| GK | (Republic of Ireland) Gary Kelly | 37 | 0 | 3 | 0 | 2 | 0 | 2 | 0 | 44 | 0 |
| GK | (Wales) Martin Thomas | 3 | 0 | 0 | 0 | 1 | 0 | 0 | 0 | 4 | 0 |
| GK | (Northern Ireland) Tommy Wright | 0 | 0 | 0 | 0 | 0 | 0 | 0 | 0 | 0 | 0 |
| DF | (Republic of Ireland) John Anderson | 33 (2) | 1 | 3 | 0 | 1 | 0 | 1 | 0 | 38 (2) | 1 |
| DF | (England) John Bailey | 3 (1) | 0 | 0 | 0 | 0 | 0 | 0 | 0 | 3 (1) | 0 |
| DF | (England) Peter Jackson | 28 | 2 | 3 | 0 | 3 | 0 | 2 | 0 | 36 | 2 |
| DF | (England) Neil McDonald | 40 | 3 | 3 | 1 | 3 | 1 | 2 | 0 | 48 | 5 |
| DF | (England) Glenn Roeder | 37 | 1 | 3 | 0 | 3 | 0 | 0 | 0 | 43 | 1 |
| DF | (England) Kevin Scott | 4 | 1 | 0 | 0 | 0 | 0 | 2 | 1 | 6 | 2 |
| DF | (England) Kenny Wharton | 28 (3) | 2 | 3 | 0 | 0 (1) | 0 | 2 | 0 | 33 (4) | 2 |
| MF | (England) Ian Bogie | 3 (4) | 0 | 0 | 0 | 0 | 0 | 2 | 1 | 5 (4) | 1 |
| MF | (England) John Cornwell | 20 (4) | 1 | 1 | 0 | 2 | 0 | 2 | 0 | 25 (4) | 1 |
| MF | (Scotland) Albert Craig | 1 (2) | 0 | 0 (1) | 0 | 0 | 0 | 2 | 0 | 3 (3) | 0 |
| MF | (England) Paul Gascoigne | 34 (1) | 7 | 3 | 3 | 3 | 1 | 2 | 0 | 42 (1) | 11 |
| MF | (Wales) Glyn Hodges | 7 | 0 | 0 | 0 | 0 | 0 | 0 | 0 | 7 | 0 |
| MF | (Northern Ireland) David McCreery | 35 | 1 | 1 | 0 | 3 | 0 | 0 | 0 | 39 | 1 |
| MF | (Northern Ireland) Michael O'Neill | 19 (2) | 12 | 2 (1) | 1 | 0 | 0 | 1 (1) | 0 | 22 (4) | 13 |
| MF | (England) Paul Stephenson | 5 (2) | 0 | 0 | 0 | 1 (1) | 0 | 0 | 0 | 6 (3) | 0 |
| MF | (England) Andy Thomas | 1 (3) | 0 | 0 | 0 | 0 | 0 | 0 | 0 | 1 (3) | 0 |
| MF | (England) Brian Tinnion | 15 (1) | 1 | 0 | 0 | 3 | 0 | 0 | 0 | 18 (1) | 1 |
| FW | (England) Paul Goddard | 35 | 8 | 3 | 1 | 3 | 1 | 0 | 0 | 41 | 10 |
| FW | (Scotland) Darren Jackson | 24 (7) | 2 | 3 | 1 | 3 | 1 | 0 | 0 | 30 (7) | 4 |
| FW | (England) Anth Lormor | 3 (2) | 2 | 0 | 0 | 0 | 0 | 0 | 0 | 3 (2) | 2 |
| FW | (Brazil) Mirandinha | 25 (1) | 11 | 2 | 0 | 2 | 1 | 2 | 1 | 31 (1) | 13 |

== Coaching staff ==
| Position | Staff |
|---|---|
| Manager | (Northern Ireland) Willie McFaul |
| Assistant Manager | (England) Colin Suggett |
| First Team coach | (England) John Pickering |

== Transfers ==
=== In ===
| Date | Player | From | Fee |
|---|---|---|---|
| July 1987 | Glyn Hodges | Wimbledon | £300,000 |
| August 1987 | Mirandinha | Palmeiras | £575,000 |
| October 1987 | Michael O'Neill | Coleraine | £100,000 |
| March 1988 | Tommy Wright | Linfield | £30,000 |

=== Out ===
| Date | Player | To | Fee |
|---|---|---|---|
| July 1987 | Joe Allon | Swansea | Free |
| September 1987 | Glyn Hodges | Watford | £300,000 |

Total spending: ▼£30,000
