= 1986–87 Newcastle United F.C. season =

Newcastle United
1986-87 season
- Chairman: Gordon McKeag
- Manager: Willie McFaul
- Stadium: St James' Park
- First Division: 17th
- FA Cup: Fifth round
- League Cup: Second round
- Top goalscorer: League: Paul Goddard (11); All: Paul Goddard (13)
- Highest home attendance: 35,079 (vs. Everton)
- Lowest home attendance: 15,893 (vs. Bradford City)
- Average home league attendance: 24,792
Home colours	Away colours

During the 1986–87 season, Newcastle United participated in the Football League First Division.

== Squad ==
Squad at end of season

Note: Flags indicate national team as defined under FIFA eligibility rules; some limited exceptions apply. Players may hold more than one non-FIFA nationality.

Pos.	Nation	Player
GK	ENG	Gary Kelly
GK	WAL	Martin Thomas
DF	ENG	John Bailey
DF	ENG	Jeff Clarke
DF	ENG	Peter Jackson
DF	ENG	Glenn Roeder
DF	ENG	Kevin Scott
DF	ENG	Kenny Wharton
DF	ENG	Jeff Wrightson
DF	IRL	John Anderson
MF	ENG	Ian Bogie
MF	ENG	Paul Gascoigne
MF	ENG	Neil McDonald

Pos.	Nation	Player
MF	ENG	Tony Nesbit
MF	ENG	Paul Stephenson
MF	ENG	Andy Thomas
MF	ENG	Brian Tinnion
MF	WAL	Alan Davies
MF	SCO	Albert Craig
MF	NIR	David McCreery
FW	ENG	Joe Allon
FW	ENG	Peter Beardsley
FW	ENG	Paul Goddard
FW	SCO	Darren Jackson
FW	NIR	Ian Stewart
FW	JAM	Tony Cunningham

=== Left club during season ===
Note: Flags indicate national team as defined under FIFA eligibility rules; some limited exceptions apply. Players may hold more than one non-FIFA nationality.

Pos.	Nation	Player
FW	ENG	Billy Whitehurst (to Oxford United)

== Coaching staff ==
Position	Staff
Manager	(Northern Ireland) Willie McFaul
Assistant Manager	(England) Colin Suggett
First Team coach	(England) John Pickering
