= Barry Jackson (footballer) =

English footballer (1938–2021)

Personal information
- Full name: Charles Barry Jackson
- Date of birth: 2 February 1938
- Place of birth: Askrigg, North Riding of Yorkshire, England
- Date of death: 7 November 2021 (aged 83)
- Place of death: Glasgow, Scotland
- Position: Defender

Senior career*
Years	Team	Apps	(Gls)
1956–1970	York City	482	(9)
1970	Scarborough	0	(0)
Total		482	(9)
- * Club domestic league appearances and goals

Charles Barry Jackson (2 February 1938 – 7 November 2021) was an English footballer who played as a defender, making 482 appearances in the Football League for York City.

== Early life and career ==
Charles Barry Jackson was born on 2 February 1938 in Askrigg, North Riding of Yorkshire. He started his career as a forward, playing in school and minor league football in York. He joined York City as an amateur in the summer of 1956 and turned professional in December. His first appearance for the club was a pre-season practice match in August 1956. Jackson spent his first two seasons at the club in the reserve team and made his debut for the first team in a 1–0 win against Oldham Athletic on the opening day of the 1958–59 season.

He helped the club to promotion on two occasions, for the 1958–59 and 1964–65 seasons. During the 1969–70 season, in three matches against Cardiff City in the FA Cup, he snuffed out the young John Toshack. He was given an eight-week suspension after being sent off against Scunthorpe United in January 1970.

Jackson was given a testimonial against Hull City in February 1970. He was released by the club at the end of the 1969–70 season. Jackson joined Scarborough of the Northern Premier League ahead of the 1970–71 season, but retired from football in August without making an appearance for the club. He went on to work for the electricity board before retiring. He ran a sweet shop at 10 Bootham for several years in the 1960s and early 1970s.

Jackson holds the record for York City appearances, having played in 539 matches in all competitions; his nephew John Pickering holds the equivalent record at Halifax Town.

He was named as York City's greatest player ever by the Professional Footballers' Association.

== Personal life ==
Jackson died on 7 November 2021, at the age of 83, in the Govan district of Glasgow, after a long illness.

== Career statistics ==
Appearances and goals by club, season and competition
Club	Season	League			FA Cup		League Cup		Total	
Club	Season	Division	Apps	Goals	Apps	Goals	Apps	Goals	Apps	Goals
York City	1958–59	Fourth Division	34	0	1	0	0	0	35	0
York City	1959–60	Third Division	37	0	3	0	0	0	40	0
York City	1960–61	Fourth Division	43	2	5	0	0	0	48	2
York City	1961–62	Fourth Division	42	1	1	0	7	1	50	2
York City	1962–63	Fourth Division	45	2	4	0	1	0	50	2
York City	1963–64	Fourth Division	38	0	1	0	4	0	43	0
York City	1964–65	Fourth Division	44	0	2	0	1	0	47	0
York City	1965–66	Third Division	45	0	1	0	3	0	49	0
York City	1966–67	Fourth Division	46	1	6	0	4	0	56	1
York City	1967–68	Fourth Division	42	1	1	0	1	0	44	1
York City	1968–69	Fourth Division	41	1	2	0	1	0	44	1
York City	1969–70	Fourth Division	25	1	7	0	1	0	33	1
Career total			482	9	34	0	23	1	539	10
