= Stan Seymour =

English footballer (1895–1978)

Personal information
- Full name: George Stanley Seymour
- Date of birth: 16 May 1895
- Place of birth: Kelloe, England
- Date of death: 24 December 1978 (aged 83)
- Place of death: Newcastle upon Tyne, England
- Height: 5 ft 6 1/2 in (1.69 m)
- Positions: Winger; forward

Youth career
- 1909–1911: Shildon Athletic

Senior career*
Years	Team	Apps	(Gls)
1911–1912	Bradford City	1	(0)
1912–1920	Greenock Morton	233	(85)
1920–1929	Newcastle United	242	(73)
Total		476	(158)

International career
1918	England (wartime)	1	(0)

Managerial career
- 1939–1947: Newcastle United
- 1950–1954: Newcastle United
- 1956–1958: Newcastle United
- * Club domestic league appearances and goals

George Stanley Seymour Sr (16 May 1895 – 24 December 1978) was an English footballer. Regarded as one of the all-time greats to play for Newcastle United, he would come to be known as "Mr Newcastle United", due to becoming manager (on three occasions), vice-chairman and director of the club. As a player, despite his small physique, he was famous for his runs from the left wing.

== Career ==
=== Early career ===
Seymour was born in Kelloe. After originally being rejected by Newcastle United as a teenager (the local pit worker was told to "come back when you grow up"), he played some non-league football for Shildon Athletic and Coxhoe before joining Bradford City in 1911 for a short spell, making only one competitive appearance. He then joined Scottish side Greenock Morton. He developed as a player at Morton, becoming popular with the locals who called him "the little Englishman". Unlike in England, a fairly normal league season was played throughout the First World War in Scotland, and in all of Seymour's time in Greenock, Morton never finished outside the top four of what was a highly competitive league. The moment he had gone, they slipped dramatically down the table. His performances were noticed back in England and he was eventually offered a transfer to Newcastle, the club who originally rejected him, in 1920 for a fee of £2,500.

=== Newcastle United ===
It did not take long for Seymour to become a crowd favourite at St. James' Park. His performances helped Newcastle reach the 1924 FA Cup final, with goals against Portsmouth, Derby County, Liverpool, and Manchester City, before scoring a thunderous 20-yard half volley to secure the win over Aston Villa. He was also part of the Newcastle team that were crowned Division One champions in 1926–27. Such displays also earned him a call-up to the England squad on a tour to Australia. In 1929, he left the club after a disagreement with officials over wages and a testimonial match. This was to be the end of his playing days as he decided to turn down the chance to join North-east rivals Middlesbrough, instead setting up a sports shop in Newcastle upon Tyne and vowing "never to kick a ball again". He also later became involved in journalism. However, his good service for Newcastle United was not forgotten and he was appointed the club's new Director in 1938.

As director, he had control of first-team affairs, but like Frank Watt, could not pick the team under the Director's Committee. He had more influence on who could play than Watt had during his time at the club, and in fact did not believe that one man should have sole responsibility for picking the team. He was manager of the club with the Directors Committee from 1938 to 1954, aside from a period from 1947 to 1950, when George Martin took over the role. In 1943, Seymour gave a trial to a 19-year-old Jackie Milburn, who later became a club legend himself. The club won the FA Cup in 1951 and retained it in 1952 whilst Seymour was at the helm.

In December 1954, Seymour stepped down from the manager's role and became the club's vice-chairman, appointing Doug Livingstone as the new manager. However, Seymour still believed that the manager's responsibilities should extend no further than training and motivating the players, something he demonstrated when Livingstone attempted to drop Milburn from the team for the 1955 FA Cup final. Seymour responded to this by immediately relieving Livingstone of his ability to select the team, picking the eventual final team largely by himself, and saw Newcastle's victory in the final as vindication of his approach. By the end of the year, Livingstone had been completely barred from working with the first team in any capacity, and his resignation near the start of 1956 allowed Seymour to fully take over the manager's role again. Newcastle's overall form deteriorated rapidly after this, though, and when the club only avoided relegation on goal average in 1958, it paved the way for chairman William McKeag (a bitter rival of Seymour's) to appoint Charlie Mitten as the new manager. Still, Seymour remained as part of the board until his death in 1978, and was appointed Life President of the club in 1976.

In a 2009 article written in The Times, Seymour was named Newcastle United's fifth greatest player of all time. He scored 83 goals in 266 games for the club.

== Legacy ==
Jackie Milburn was once quoted saying "There is a great debt owed by Newcastle United to Stan Seymour for all of his services to the club".

The North Eastern League Cup (in which teams from the Northern Football Alliance Premier Division compete in) was renamed the Stan Seymour League Cup in his honour.

== Personal life ==
Seymour was married to his wife Charlotte, a native of Benton, Tyne and Wear. The couple had two children, both of whom were associated with Newcastle United. Their eldest son, Stan Seymour Jr., was born in Scotland while Seymour was playing for Greenock Morton. He later joined Newcastle's board of directors and became chairman of the club from 1981 to 1988. Their other son, Colin Seymour, played wartime football for Newcastle, but was killed in action during the Second World War.

== Honours ==
=== Player ===
Greenock Morton

- Scottish Football League runner-up: 1916–17
- Great War Shield: 1914–15

Newcastle United

- Football League First Division: 1926–27
- FA Cup: 1923–24

=== Manager ===
Newcastle United

- FA Cup: 1950–51, 1951–52
