= Paul Gascoigne =

English footballer and manager (born 1967)

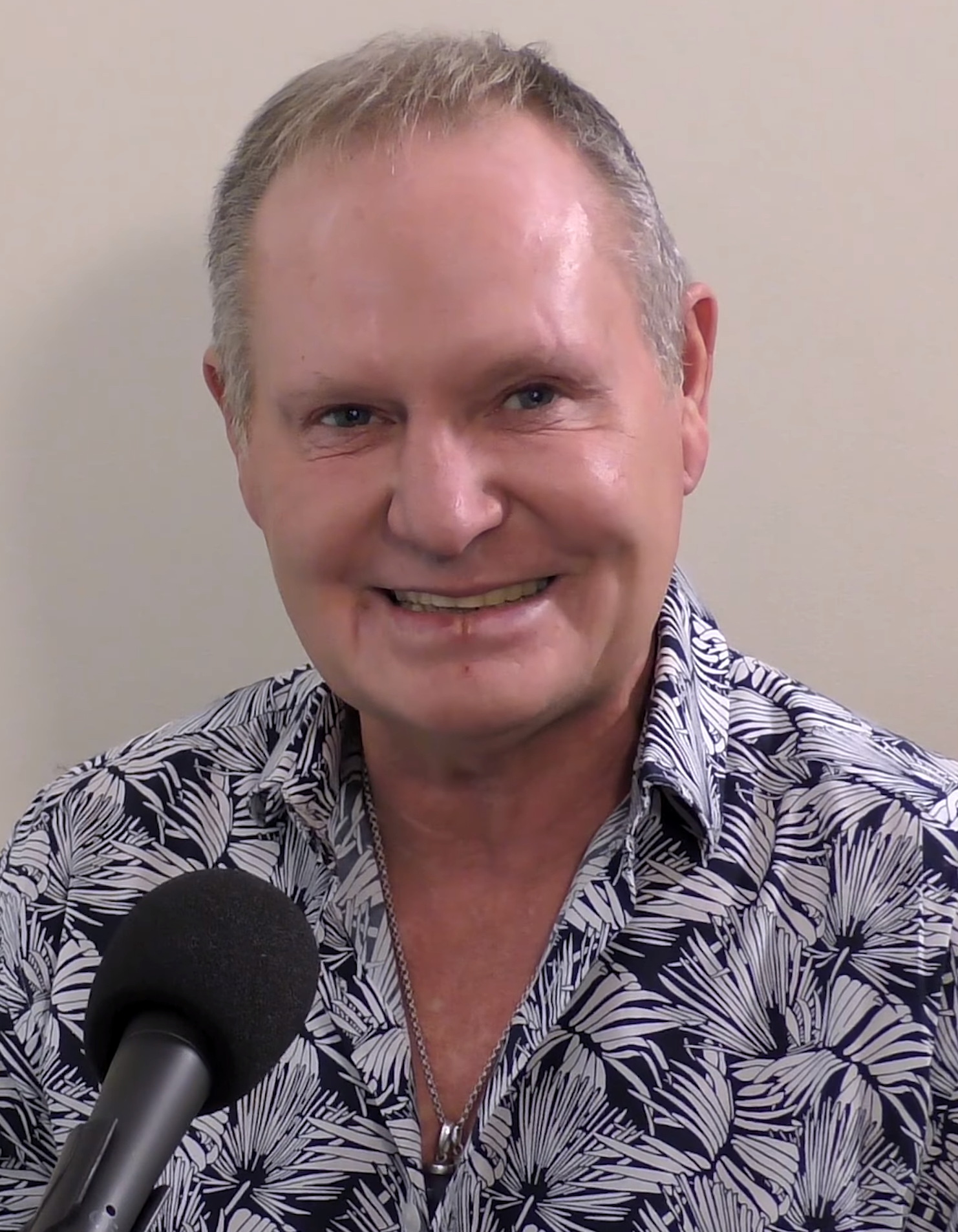
- Gascoigne in 2021

Personal information
- Full name: Paul John Gascoigne
- Date of birth: 27 May 1967 (age 59)
- Place of birth: Gateshead, England
- Height: 5 ft 10 in (1.77 m)
- Position: Attacking midfielder

Youth career
- 1980–1985: Newcastle United

Senior career*
Years	Team	Apps	(Gls)
1985–1988	Newcastle United	92	(21)
1988–1992	Tottenham Hotspur	92	(19)
1992–1995	Lazio	43	(6)
1995–1998	Rangers	74	(30)
1998–2000	Middlesbrough	41	(4)
2000–2002	Everton	32	(1)
2002	Burnley	6	(0)
2003	Gansu Tianma	4	(2)
2004	Boston United	4	(0)
Total		388	(83)

International career
1987–1988	England U21	12	(5)
1989	England B	4	(1)
1988–1998	England	57	(10)

Managerial career
- 2005: Kettering Town
- * Club domestic league appearances and goals

Paul John Gascoigne (/ˈɡæskɔɪn/ GASK-oyn; born 27 May 1967), nicknamed Gazza, is an English former professional footballer who played as an attacking midfielder. Regarded as one of the best playmakers of his generation and one of the best English footballers of all time, Gascoigne is described by the National Football Museum as "widely recognised as the most naturally talented English footballer of his generation". Gascoigne was immensely popular during his playing career, with television broadcaster Terry Wogan calling him "probably the most popular man in Britain today" in September 1990, and public interest in and adoration for him came to be known as "Gazzamania".

Born and raised in Gateshead, Gascoigne signed schoolboy terms with Newcastle United before turning professional with the club in 1984. Three years later, he was sold to Tottenham Hotspur for £2.2 million. He won the FA Cup with Spurs in 1991 before being sold to Italian club Lazio for £5.5 million. In 1995, he was transferred to Rangers for £4.3 million and helped the club to two league titles, a Scottish Cup and a Scottish League Cup. He returned to England in a £3.4 million move to Middlesbrough in 1998. He debuted in the Premier League in the 1998–99 season, having already featured in the 1998 Football League Cup final. He switched to Everton in 2000 and later had spells with Burnley, Gansu Tianma and Boston United.

Gascoigne represented the England national team from 1988 to 1998, in which he was capped 57 times and scored ten goals. He was part of the England team that reached fourth place in the 1990 FIFA World Cup, where he famously cried after receiving a yellow card in the semi-final with West Germany, which meant he would have been suspended for the final had England won the game. He also helped the team to the semi-finals of Euro 96, which included scoring a goal against Scotland, described in 2013 as "one of the most iconic goals in the game's recent history". He has been involved in a number of high-profile goal celebrations at both club and international level, including the "dentist's chair" celebration from Euro 96, and mimicking playing the flute with Rangers in 1998, a reference to the Protestant Orange Order.

In the later part of his career, and especially following retirement, Gascoigne's life became dominated by severe mental and emotional problems, particularly alcoholism. He has been jailed or sectioned on numerous occasions, and his struggles receive regular coverage in the British press. He has frequently attempted to live without alcohol, though rehabilitation programmes have provided only temporary relief. His issues ended his coaching career, and he has not worked in football since being dismissed as the manager of Kettering Town in 2005.

== Early life ==
Gascoigne was born in Gateshead, on 27 May 1967. His father, John (1946–2018), was a hod carrier, and his mother, Carol, worked in a factory. He was named Paul John Gascoigne in tribute to Paul McCartney and John Lennon of the Beatles. He is of Irish descent through his grandparents.

He attended Breckenbeds Junior High School, then the Heathfield Senior High School, both in the Low Fell area of Gateshead. He was noticed by football scouts while playing for Gateshead Boys, though failed to impress in a trial at Ipswich Town. Further trials at Middlesbrough and Southampton also proved unsuccessful before the team he supported, Newcastle United, signed him as a schoolboy in 1980. Former Ipswich and Newcastle scout Charlie Woods has claimed Ipswich were keen on signing Gascoigne, but once Newcastle got wind they quickly signed up the youngster. Gascoigne frequently got into trouble with his friend, Jimmy "Five Bellies" Gardner. The pair were taken to court and fined over a hit and run incident. Newcastle chairman Stan Seymour Jr. described Gascoigne as "George Best without brains".

While Gascoigne was successful on the football field, his childhood was marked by instability and tragedy. Initially, his family lived in a single upstairs room in a council house with a shared bathroom and moved several times during his early life. When he was ten, Gascoigne witnessed the death of Steven Spraggon, the younger brother of a friend, who was killed in a traffic collision. Around this time, his father began to experience seizures. Gascoigne began developing obsessions and twitches, and was taken into therapy, but soon quit the therapy sessions after his father expressed doubts over the treatment methods.

Gascoigne developed an addiction to gaming machines, frequently spending all his money on them, and also began shoplifting to fund his addiction. He experienced further tragedy when a friend, whom he had encouraged to join Newcastle United from Middlesbrough, died whilst he was working for Gascoigne's uncle on a building site.

Brian Tinnion met Gascoigne for the first time at 14 when Tinnion signed for Dunston Juniors, another side Gascoigne played for. Tinnion explained that though Gascoigne eventually became the stand out, by the age of 15, most felt that Ian Bogie would be the top player out of this particular Newcastle youth set up. Gascoigne decided to provide financially for his family, and saw professional football as a way of earning more money than the rest of the family combined. He enjoyed football and later wrote that "I didn't have twitches or worry about death when I was playing football". He was signed on as an apprentice at Newcastle on his 16th birthday.

He was usually overweight whilst signed to the Newcastle youth side. Jack Charlton, the Newcastle manager, claimed Gascoigne was "a bit chubby" and looked anything but a footballer. Gascoigne ate Mars bars and other junk food. Charlton was not overly concerned as he believed this weight would give Gascoigne extra strength on the football pitch and did not seem to slow him down. He also noted that Gascoigne showed early signs of being gaffe-prone and a prankster. Charlton warned Gascoigne about his junk food diet and gave him two weeks to lose the extra weight. Gascoigne then trained for ten days wrapped in a black bag.

== Club career ==
=== Newcastle United ===
==== 1984–1985: Youth career ====
Gascoigne captained Newcastle United's youth team to the FA Youth Cup in the 1984–85 season and scored twice in the 4–1 victory over Watford in the final at Vicarage Road. In the first leg of the final, they drew 0–0. Teammate Joe Allon stated that Newcastle were unusually poor in the first leg, but in the second leg, Gascoigne was instrumental in Newcastle's victory. After the match, Jack Charlton told Gascoigne he would be in the first team the next day against Norwich City. Gascoigne did travel to Norwich, though Charlton chose not to pick him.

==== 1985–1987: Constant success ====
Gascoigne made his first-team debut as a substitute for George Reilly in a 1–0 win over Queens Park Rangers on 13 April 1985 at St James' Park. Charlton later noted that Gascoigne's first-team appearances under him were too brief to suggest he was more than a useful talent. At the age of 18, Gascoigne signed a two-year £120 a week contract at Newcastle, with the club also having a further two-year option clause. Through noting Gascoigne's generous personality, Charlton arranged that around half of Gascoigne's wage be paid into a bank account for him to collect in a lump sum at the end of his first contract.

Willie McFaul took over as manager for the 1985–86 season and named Gascoigne in his starting lineup from the opening game of the campaign; he took the place of Chris Waddle, who had been sold to Tottenham Hotspur in the summer. He scored his first goal at home to Oxford United in a 3–0 victory on 21 September 1985 and claimed a further eight goals in the 1985–86 campaign. Newcastle finished 11th in the First Division that season and, at the end of it, Gascoigne was featured on the front cover of the Rothmans Football Yearbook. He scored 5 goals in 24 league games in the 1986–87 season, as the "Magpies" slipped to 17th place, just three points above the relegation play-offs.

==== 1987–1988: Transfer rumours ====
External videos
- Jackie Milburn on Gascoigne, 1988

In 1988, on the BBC programme Football Focus, Newcastle's then all-time top scorer, Jackie Milburn, stated that Gascoigne was "the best player in the world". In a 0–0 draw with Wimbledon at Plough Lane in February 1988, hard-man Vinnie Jones singled him out for attention, and in an incident that would become a much-publicised photograph, Jones grabbed him by the genitals as Gascoigne screamed in agony. He was named as the PFA Young Player of the Year and listed on the PFA Team of the Year in the 1987–88 season. However, his period at Newcastle coincided with unrest and instability at the club, which left the club unable to hold on to such a talented young player. Gascoigne promised Alex Ferguson that he would sign for Manchester United. Ferguson duly went on holiday to Malta, expecting to sign Gascoigne. On his holiday, he received the news that Gascoigne had signed for Tottenham Hotspur for a record British fee of £2.2 million. In his 1999 autobiography, Ferguson claimed that Gascoigne was wooed into signing for Spurs after they bought a house for his impoverished family. Gascoigne, in his autobiography, states that after he was given his £100,000 signing-on fee, he spent £70,000 buying property for his mother and father.

=== Tottenham Hotspur ===
==== 1988–1990: Club Player of the Year ====
In his first season at White Hart Lane, Gascoigne helped Terry Venables's Tottenham Hotspur to sixth in the First Division, scoring 7 goals in 37 appearances. They rose to third place in 1989–90, but were still 16 points behind champions Liverpool. On 26 September, he scored four goals in a 5–0 victory against Hartlepool United in the second round of the 1990–91 Football League Cup. He was named as BBC Sports Personality of the Year in 1990, and on accepting the award said: "I haven't won anything in the game as yet. But the World Cup did help to put England on the map". He was also named as the club's Player of the Year.

==== 1990–1992: FA Cup, injuries and transfer rumours ====
Gascoigne was named on the PFA Team of the Year in the 1990–91 season as Tottenham reached the FA Cup Final, with victories over Blackpool, Oxford United, Portsmouth, Notts County and North London derby rivals Arsenal. He scored the opening goal of the 3–1 victory over Arsenal at Wembley with a free-kick, one of six goals he scored in the competition. At this juncture, Spurs were also under significant financial strain with a huge £10 million debt. With Spurs being tied to massive debt, they hired a financial advisor called Nat Solomon. Solomon strongly argued for selling Gascoigne to Lazio to keep the vultures at bay. Going into the final against Nottingham Forest, Spurs had readily accepted an offer from Lazio and Gascoigne had already agreed to the playing terms to join the Italian club. The deal would be worth £8.5 million to Tottenham. His final was to end in injury; however as 15 minutes into the game, he committed a dangerous knee-high foul on Gary Charles and ruptured his own cruciate ligaments in his right knee. England teammate Stuart Pearce scored from the resultant free-kick, and Gascoigne subsequently collapsed after the kick-off, forcing him to leave the match on a stretcher. Tottenham went on to win the Cup in extra-time.

"I'm very pleased for Paul but it's like watching your mother-in-law drive off a cliff in your new car."

— Terry Venables spoke after the deal with Lazio was agreed upon.

He missed the entire 1991–92 season while he recovered, suffering a further knee injury in late 1991 when an incident at a nightclub on Tyneside kept him out for even longer. The saga over Gascoigne's proposed transfer to Lazio dominated the tabloid press throughout 1991, often overshadowing the key national news of that time – namely the recession and rise in unemployment that it sparked – although the broadsheet newspapers generally kept stories about Gascoigne confined to their back pages.

=== Lazio ===
==== 1992–1993: Success in Italy ====
"He was a lovely boy, lovely, such a heart. But a troubled boy. He ate ice cream for breakfast, he drank beer for lunch … But a player? Oh, beautiful, beautiful."

— Dino Zoff.

Gascoigne eventually joined Lazio for a fee of £5.5 million; he received a £2 million signing-on fee and signed a contract worth £22,000 a week. He made his Serie A debut on 27 September 1992 in a match against Genoa, which was televised in Britain as well as Italy. He failed to fully settle in Italy and was beset by negative media interest which was not helped by the numerous occasions he punched reporters, and the time when he belched down a microphone on live television. He was well received by the club's fans, but not by the club's owner Sergio Cragnotti, who resented him after Gascoigne greeted him by saying "Tua figlia, grande tette" (roughly translated as "Your daughter, big tits"). His form was inconsistent in his first season at the Stadio Olimpico as he had previously spent a year out injured, but he endeared himself to Eagles fans when he scored in the 89th minute to equalise during the Rome derby against AS Roma. He broke his cheekbone whilst on international duty in April 1993, and had to play the remaining games of the season in a mask. Lazio ended the campaign in fifth place, which was considered a success as it meant qualification for European competition for the first time in 16 years.

==== 1993–1995: Weight issues and injury ====
Gascoigne fell badly out of shape before the 1993–94 season and was told by manager Dino Zoff to lose 13kg by the start of the campaign else he would lose his first-team place. Gascoigne went on an extreme weight loss diet and shed excess fat. In one spell out injured Zoff told Gascoigne to go on holiday to recuperate. Gascoigne explained to Zoff that he did not want to go on holiday. To the surprise of the Lazio fitness staff, Gascoigne arrived back from his holiday overweight. When he spoke to the coach about his weight, Gascoigne told Zoff, "I told you not to send me on holiday, Signor Zoff!" He captained the club against Cremonese when regular captain Roberto Cravero was substituted.

In 1994, Zdeněk Zeman arrived from Foggia to coach Lazio and Gascoigne. Zeman was a coach who was noted for using his whistle in training sessions. One session, Zeman misplaced his whistle and found it when a goose who frequented the Lazio training ground was seen wearing it. Pierluigi Casiraghi later reasoned Gascoigne was the culprit who placed Zeman's whistle on the goose. In April 1994, he broke his leg in training whilst attempting to tackle Alessandro Nesta. Upon his recovery, he was disgruntled with Zeman's stern fitness approach, and both club and player decided to part ways at the end of the 1994–95 season.

=== Rangers ===
==== 1995–1996: Domestic double ====
"There's no doubt that Gascoigne has been one of the players to brighten up Scottish football over the last 30 to 40 years. It was an absolute privilege and a pleasure to play with somebody of that talent. I actually think we got the best of Gascoigne when he was at Rangers. And does he deserve his place in the Scotland Hall of Fame? You're joking, 100% he does."

— Ally McCoist in 2018.

Rangers manager Walter Smith flew to visit Gascoigne at his home in the Rome countryside in the early summer of 1995. Smith explained: "He said, 'What are you doing here?' I said, 'I'm here to see you.' He said, 'What is it you're wanting?' I said, 'I'm here to see if you'll come and play for Rangers.' He said, 'Aye, alright.'"

Gascoigne signed for Rangers in July 1995 for a club record fee of £4.3 million, on wages of £15,000 a week. He made an immediate impact: in the fifth league game of the 1995–96 season, the Old Firm fixture at Celtic Park, he scored a goal after running almost the full length of the pitch to get on the end of a pass in a breakaway; it proved vital as this was the only match lost by title rivals Celtic during the campaign. On 30 December, Gascoigne was booked by referee Dougie Smith after picking Smith's yellow card up from the ground and jokingly 'booking' the referee during a match against Hibernian. Rangers went on to win the Scottish Premier Division, clinching the title in the penultimate game of the season against Aberdeen at Ibrox Stadium; Gascoigne scored a hat-trick including two solo efforts. Rangers won the double as they also won the Scottish Cup by knocking out Celtic before beating Heart of Midlothian 5–1 in the final at Hampden Park. He scored 19 goals in 42 appearances in all competitions, and was named as both PFA Scotland Players' Player of the Year and SFWA Footballer of the Year.

==== 1996–1997: Domestic double and decline in form ====
Rangers won the league title again in 1996–97, their ninth in succession. Gascoigne claimed hat-tricks against Kilmarnock and Motherwell and ended the campaign with 17 goals in 34 games. However, during this season, manager Walter Smith and assistant Archie Knox became increasingly concerned over Gascoigne's reliance on alcohol. The Gers won another double by also winning the Scottish League Cup, beating Hearts 4–3 in the final at Celtic Park, with Gascoigne scoring twice and Ally McCoist claiming the other two goals.

In 1997, young Italian player Gennaro Gattuso joined Rangers. He was welcomed to Ibrox by Gascoigne, who defecated in Gattuso's sock as a prank. Gascoigne would also buy Gattuso his club suits under the pretence Rangers were paying for them; Gattuso found out many months later from other sources that it was Gascoigne who secretly paid the bill. In November 1997, Gascoigne received a five-match ban after being sent off for violent conduct during the Old Firm derby following an incident with Celtic midfielder Morten Wieghorst. In January 1998, Gascoigne courted serious controversy when he mimed playing a flute (symbolic of the flute-playing of Orange Order marchers) while warming up as a substitute during an Old Firm match at Celtic Park. Having already made the same gesture as a goal celebration shortly after joining the club in 1995, at that time claiming to have been ignorant of its meaning, his actions infuriated Celtic fans who had been taunting him and Gascoigne was fined £20,000 by Rangers after the incident. He also received a death threat from an IRA member. The 1997–98 season was less successful. Gascoigne scored just 3 goals in 28 games and was sold on while Rangers failed to win any trophies after he had departed, losing the league title to Celtic and the Scottish Cup final to Hearts.

=== Middlesbrough ===
Gascoigne left Scotland to join Middlesbrough for £3.45 million in March 1998, where former England teammate Bryan Robson was manager. His first match was the 1998 Football League Cup Final defeat to Chelsea at Wembley, where he came on as a substitute. He played seven games in the First Division, helping "Boro" into the Premier League as runners-up to Nottingham Forest at the end of the 1997–98 season.

Before the 1998–99 campaign began, Gascoigne began having blackouts after blaming himself for the death of a friend, who died after Gascoigne and a group of friends went on a night out drinking. Despite his ongoing personal problems and his spell in rehab, Gascoigne started the season in good form and helped Middlesbrough into fourth place by Christmas. They ended the season in ninth place and having scored 3 goals in 26 top-flight games Gascoigne was linked with a recall to the England squad, who were now managed by former teammate Kevin Keegan and lacking a creative presence in midfield.

His career went into terminal decline during the 1999–2000 campaign, with Gascoigne breaking his arm after elbowing opposition midfield player George Boateng in the head during Middlesbrough's 4–0 defeat to Aston Villa at the Riverside Stadium. He subsequently received a three-match ban and £5,000 fine from the Football Association.

=== Everton ===
Gascoigne signed a two-year contract with Everton, managed by former Rangers boss Walter Smith, after joining on a free transfer in July 2000. He started the 2000–01 season well despite not playing every game due to his lack of fitness, but a series of niggling injuries and his ongoing depression took him out of the first team picture by Christmas.

After spending time at an alcohol rehabilitation clinic in Arizona, Gascoigne was fit enough to play for the Toffees in the 2001–02 season, and he scored his first goal for the club – and last in English football – away to Bolton Wanderers on 3 November. Gascoigne then suffered a hernia injury, which kept him out of action for three months. Walter Smith left Goodison Park in March, and Gascoigne left the club shortly after Smith's successor, David Moyes, took charge.

=== Later career ===
George Reynolds made an attempt to bring Gascoigne to Darlington, at that time playing in the Third Division, but talks broke down, and Gascoigne finished the 2001–02 season with Stan Ternent's Burnley. Gascoigne made six First Division appearances for Burnley. The club narrowly missed out on the play-offs, and he left Turf Moor after two months. In 2002, he was inducted into the National Football Museum, being described as "the most naturally gifted English midfielder of his generation". Fellow England midfielder Paul Ince said that Gascoigne was "the best player I've ever played with ... he had everything. He was amazing."

In the summer of 2002, Gascoigne went on trial with Major League Soccer club D.C. United but rejected a contract. First Division club Gillingham also made enquiries, and Gascoigne had an unsuccessful trial with the club. In February 2003, he signed a nine-month contract with China League One club Gansu Tianma in both a playing and coaching role. Gascoigne scored in his first match in China, and in total scored two goals in four league games but his mental state meant that he had to return to the United States for treatment against drink and depression in April, and he never returned despite the club ordering him to do so.

In October 2003, Gascoigne was offered an opportunity to train with Wolverhampton Wanderers. However a month later Wolves rejected the option on providing Gascoigne a contract.

In July 2004, after proving his fitness in pre-season with Radcliffe Borough. Gascoigne was signed as player-coach by League Two side Boston United. Upon signing he spoke of his coaching aspirations, saying that "I can become a great coach and a great manager". Gascoigne left Boston after he made five appearances in three months, citing professional reasons including his coaching career. Former Rangers teammate Graham Roberts made an unsuccessful attempt to sign Gascoigne as a player-coach at Clyde in 2005.

In August 2014, Gascoigne joined amateur club Abbey in Division Four of the Bournemouth Sunday League.

== International career ==
Gascoigne was called up to the England under-21 side in the summer of 1987 and scored with a free-kick in his debut in a 2–0 win over Morocco. He went on to win 12 caps for the under-21s under Dave Sexton. The team were semi finalists at the UEFA U-21 Euros and finalists at the Toulon Tournament beaten on both occasions by France in 1988.

Gascoigne was first called up to the full England squad by Bobby Robson for a friendly against Denmark on 14 September 1988 and came on as a late substitute for Peter Beardsley in a 1–0 win. He scored his first goal for England in a 5–0 victory over Albania at Wembley on 26 April 1989. He made his first start in the following game against Chile and kept his first team place for most matches in the run in to the 1990 FIFA World Cup. He also played four games for the England B team. He secured his place in the World Cup squad in a 4–2 win against Czechoslovakia when he scored one goal and was a key component in the other three.

Gascoigne went to the World Cup in Italy, having never started a competitive international. He played in all three of the group games and England topped Group F, Gascoigne providing the assist for Mark Wright's winner against Egypt. In the first knockout game against Belgium, he made another assist after chipping a free-kick into the penalty area, where David Platt volleyed the ball into the net. Gascoigne was at the centre of the action again in the quarter-final clash with Cameroon when he gave away a penalty, which Cameroon converted. In extra time, he made a successful through-ball pass from which Gary Lineker won and subsequently scored a penalty, which proved to be the winning goal. Referring to the 1990 World Cup, Bryan Robson later commented that Gascoigne was the "best player" he had ever played with, saying that in 1990 he "was challenging Maradona as the best player in the world at that time." During the quarter-final match against Cameroon, Gascoigne completed 13 dribbles, tying the World Cup record for most dribbles completed in a match set by Brazil's Jairzinho against Uruguay in 1970; his record was broken four years later by Jay-Jay Okocha, who completed 15 in Nigeria's round of 16 tie with Italy.

"Before Paul Gascoigne, did anyone ever become a national hero and a dead-cert millionaire by crying? Fabulous. Weep and the world weeps with you."

— Salman Rushdie writing in The Independent in 1990.

"Out of everything in my career, the moment people ask me about most often was when Gazza got booked in that semi-final. I could see his bottom lip was going. I think it says a lot about Bobby that it was him I turned to, to ask him to have a word. I didn't know that the moment would be caught on camera."

— Gary Lineker.

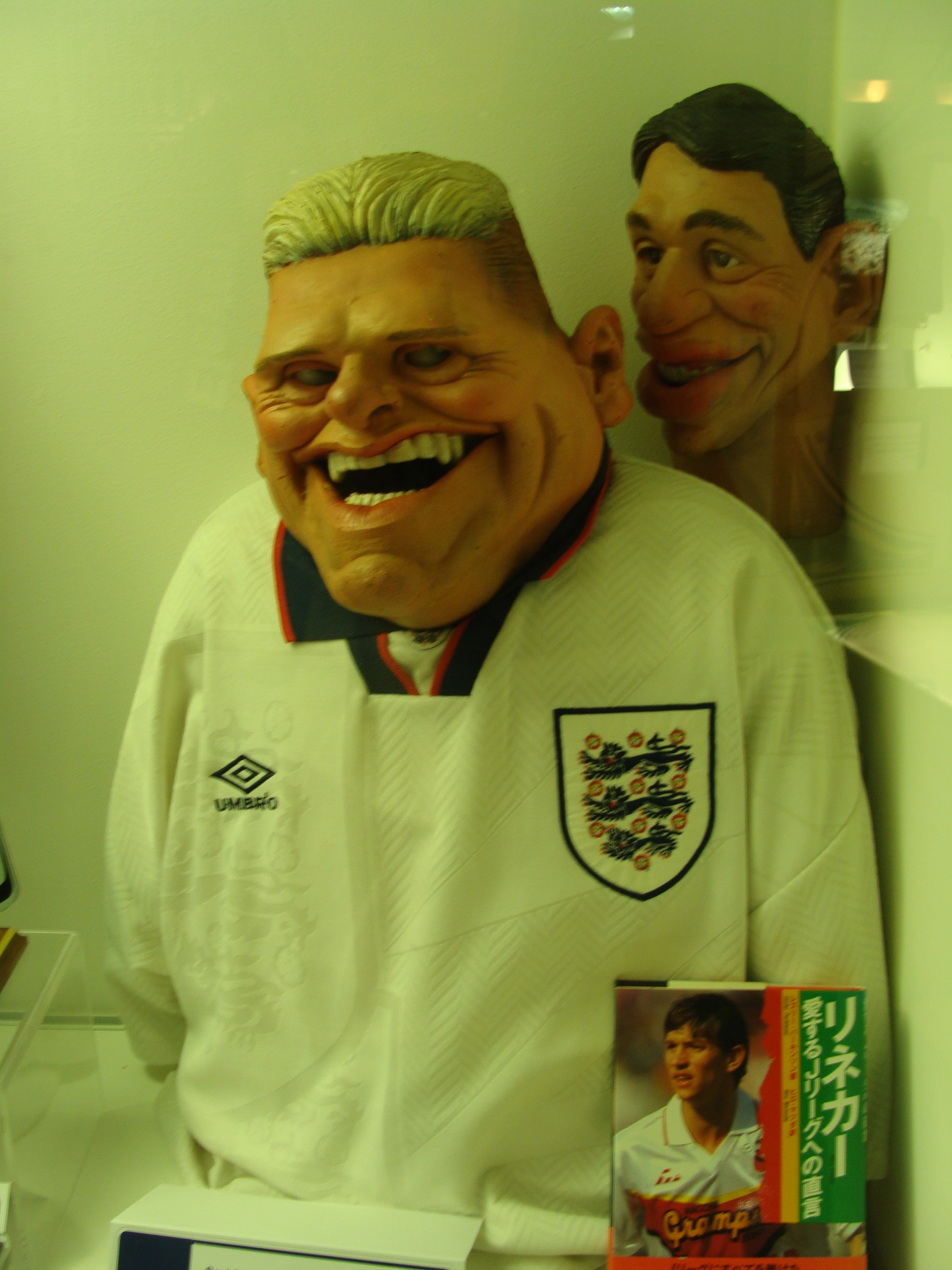
His tears in the national limelight made Gascoigne famous enough to be lampooned on Spitting Image. His puppet, which employed projectile tears, is now on display at the National Football Museum.

On 4 July 1990, England played West Germany in a World Cup semi-final match at Juventus's Stadio delle Alpi in Turin. Gascoigne, having already received a yellow card during England's 1–0 victory over Belgium in the second round, was booked for a foul on Thomas Berthold, which meant that he would be suspended for the final if England won the match. Television cameras showed that he had tears in his eyes following the yellow card, which made Gascoigne a highly popular figure with the sympathetic British public. The match culminated in a penalty shoot-out, which the Germans won after Stuart Pearce and Chris Waddle missed their penalties. Throughout the tournament, Gascoigne completed the most dribbles (30).

Robson quit the England job after the tournament. His successor Graham Taylor dropped Gascoigne in favour of 32-year-old Gordon Cowans in a Euro '92 qualifier against the Republic of Ireland in November 1990, citing tactical reasons. He returned to the starting lineup for a friendly against Cameroon the following February before an injury in the FA Cup final three months later caused him to miss the next twenty-one England fixtures, including all of UEFA Euro 1992, where England failed to progress beyond the group stages.

Gascoigne returned to fitness in time for the opening World Cup qualifying game against Norway in October 1992, and before playing in the 1–1 draw, he responded to a Norwegian television crew's request to say 'a few words to Norway', by saying "fuck off Norway". His message was broadcast on Norwegian television and he was forced to apologise for the remark. The following month he scored two goals in a 4–0 victory over Turkey. Qualification ended badly for England, as they ended in third place behind Norway and the Netherlands and missed out on a place in the 1994 FIFA World Cup.

A broken leg in 1994 meant Gascoigne could not play for 15 months. By the time he returned to fitness, Terry Venables – his former manager at Spurs – had been appointed as England manager. As England was hosting UEFA Euro 1996, they did not have to go through the qualification process, so they instead played numerous friendlies, most of which featured Gascoigne in the starting line-up. The last of these games was played in Hong Kong, after which numerous England players were photographed on a night out in which Gascoigne and several others having drinks poured into their mouths whilst sitting in the "dentist's chair". The tournament opened with a 1–1 draw with Switzerland, during which Gascoigne was substituted. He scored in England's second game of the tournament, against Scotland (where he was playing at club level at the time). Receiving the ball from Darren Anderton outside the Scotland penalty area, he flicked the ball over Colin Hendry with his left foot and changed direction; Hendry was completely wrong-footed and, as the ball dropped, Gascoigne volleyed it with his right foot past Andy Goram to seal a 2–0 victory. The goal was followed by the "dentist's chair" celebration referring to the incident before the tournament, where Gascoigne lay on the ground as if he were sitting in the dentist's chair. Teammates sprayed water from Lucozade bottles into his open mouth.

External videos
- Andy Goram on Gascoigne's goal

Terry Venables later wrote that "Pelé at his best would not have bettered that movement and finish", calling the goal "a goal of unimpeachable quality, world-class, extraordinary, a wonder to behold".

England beat the Netherlands 4–1 to make it to the knock-out stages. They then drew 0–0 with Spain before winning 4–2 on penalties, the last of which was converted by Gascoigne. England drew 1–1 with Germany in the semi-finals, and Gascoigne missed the chance to win the game in extra time when he came inches away from connecting to an Alan Shearer cross yards in front of an unguarded German net. England lost to Germany in the resulting penalty shoot-out, with Gareth Southgate missing England's sudden death penalty. Referring to the 1996 European Championships, Xavi stated that he remembered "the European Championships in England with Gascoigne playing some great matches", calling the experience "spectacular".

"Gazza is no longer a fat, drunken imbecile. He is, in fact, a football genius."

— The Daily Mirror editorial entitled "Mr Paul Gascoigne: An Apology" following his solo goal against Scotland in Euro 96.

Under Glenn Hoddle, Gascoigne was picked regularly and helped England win the Tournoi de France in 1997 ahead of Brazil, France and Italy. Qualification for the 1998 FIFA World Cup went down to the last group game against Italy at the Stadio Olimpico, and Gascoigne put in a disciplined and mature performance to help England secure the 0–0 draw that was enough to take them through to the tournament. Following qualification, British tabloid newspapers would publish pictures of Gascoigne eating kebabs late at night with his DJ friend Chris Evans. These pictures were published only a week before the final squad was due to be chosen. The pictures disturbed Hoddle, who elected not to pick Gascoigne in the final squad. After hearing the news, Gascoigne wrecked Hoddle's room in a rage before being restrained. Gascoigne, who won 57 caps and scored ten goals, would never play for England again.

== Managerial and coaching career ==
Having already gained some coaching experience in China, and having proven his fitness with Radcliffe Borough in pre-season Gascoigne signed for Boston United on 30 July 2004 as player-coach. After being at the club for 11 games he left (partly as a result of the club refusing to let him participate in the reality television show I'm a Celebrity...Get Me Out of Here!) on 5 October, to begin a football coaching course. After leaving Boston, he stated that he was interested in taking over as manager of Scottish side Greenock Morton, but this came to nothing.

In mid-2005, he spent two months as a player-coach for the recently founded Portuguese team Algarve United, but he returned to England after a proposed contract never materialised. He was appointed manager of Conference North club Kettering Town on 27 October 2005 and also planned to put in enough money to own one-third of the club to show his commitment. Previous manager Kevin Wilson was appointed as director of football, and Paul Davis was appointed as the club's assistant manager. Bookmakers put odds on Gascoigne being dismissed before Christmas, though he insisted that he was at the club "for the long haul". Attempts to get new sponsors on board were successful, though results on the pitch soon went against Kettering. His tenure lasted just 39 days, and the club's board dismissed him on 5 December. The club's owner, Imraan Ladak, blamed Gascoigne's alcohol problems, stating that he drank almost every day he worked. Gascoigne later claimed that the owner had interfered incessantly and harboured ambitions of being a manager himself, despite knowing little about football. He was never on a contract at the club and was never paid for his six weeks' work, nor was he given a chance to invest money in the club as he had first planned.

Gascoigne came close to being appointed manager of Garforth Town in October 2010. After weeks of talks between his agent and the club, he decided to turn down the offer, though reiterated his desire to return to football management.

== Other projects ==
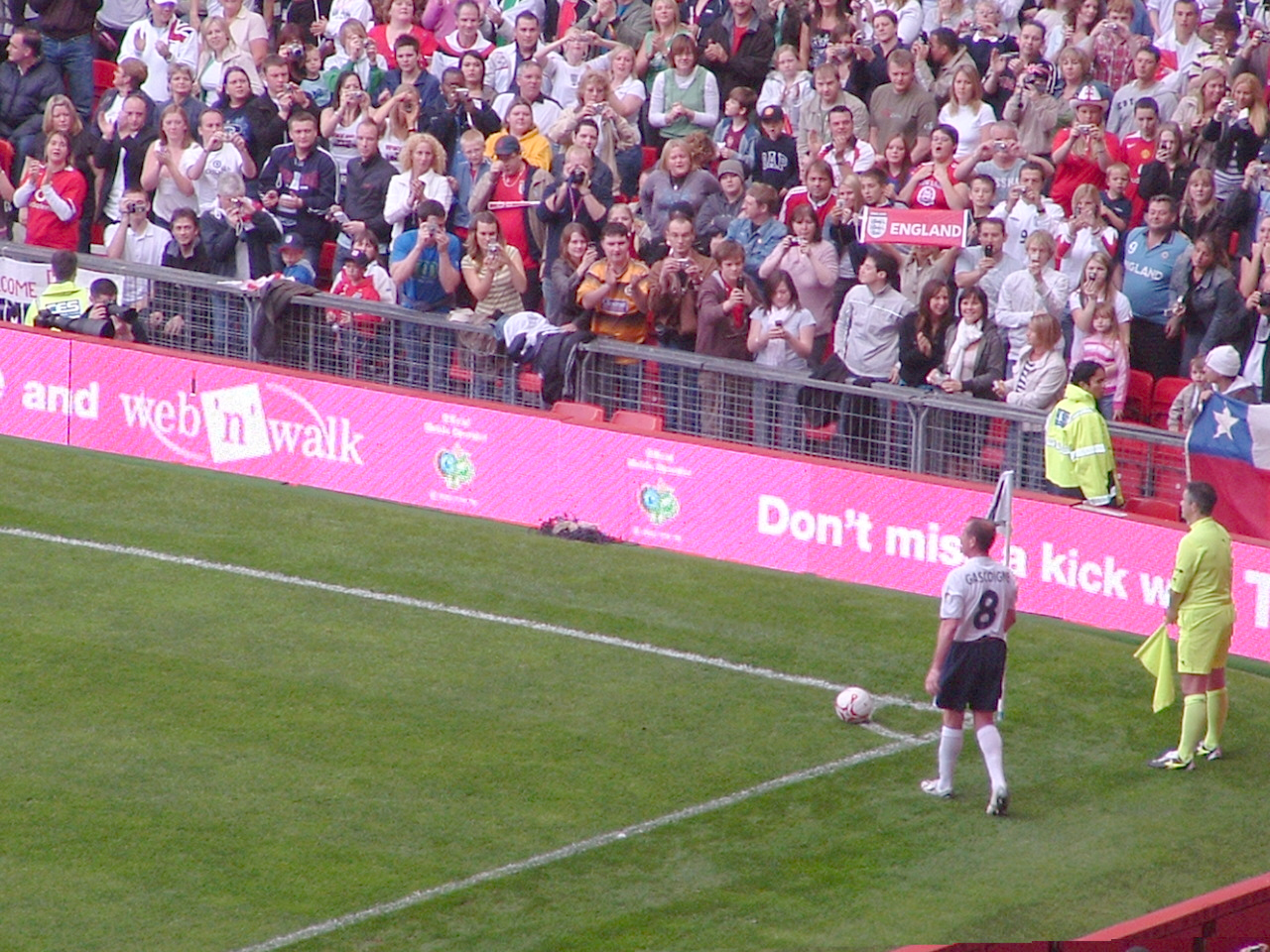
Gascoigne playing for England during Soccer Aid in May 2006.

At the height of "Gazzamania" following the 1990 World Cup, he reached number 2 in the UK Top 40 with "Fog on the Tyne", a collaborative cover with Lindisfarne that earned him a gold disc. He established Paul Gascoigne Promotions. He hired several staff to handle the hundreds of requests from companies wishing to use his likeness and/or endorsement to promote their products. He signed an exclusive deal with The Sun, which did not prevent the newspaper from joining its rivals in sensationalising the various scandals he became embroiled in. He promoted two video games: Gazza's Superstar Soccer and Gazza II.

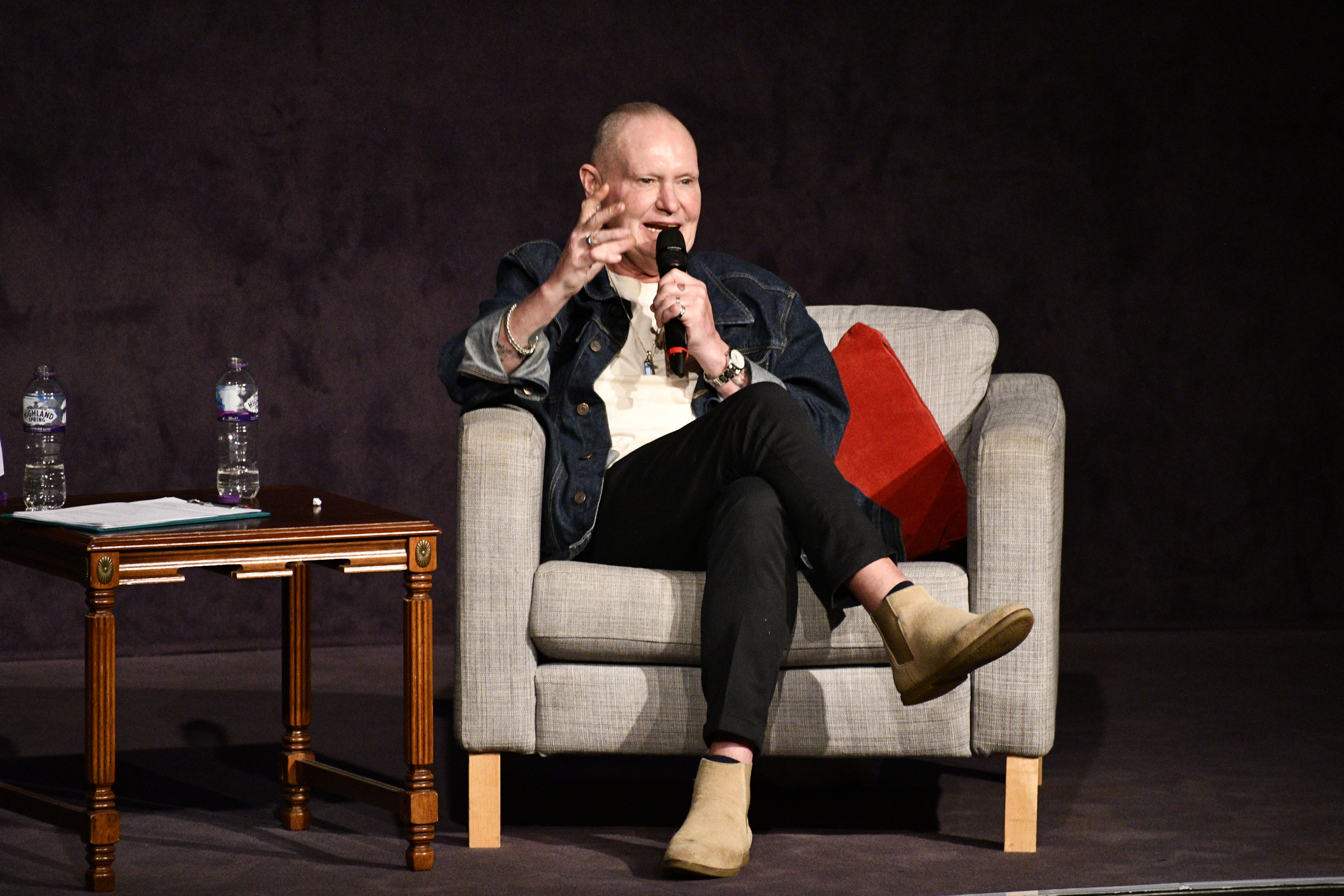
Gascoigne speaking at an event in Southampton, 2023

In August 2006, he visited Botswana on behalf of the Football Association's international outreach week. He played football with the children from the SOS Children's Village there. On 25 July 2009, Gascoigne appeared on a Sporting Heroes edition of the BBC television quiz The Weakest Link, where he engaged in banter with host Anne Robinson. The next day, he played in an England versus Germany charity football match to help raise funds for the Sir Bobby Robson Foundation. He took part in the first edition of Soccer Aid in 2006, playing for an England team captained by Robbie Williams.

In August 2014, Gascoigne began playing amateur football after signing for Bournemouth Sunday League Division Four team Abbey. In 2015, he was the subject of a documentary film called Gascoigne, and in 2022 he was the subject of a two-part documentary series Gazza.

== Style of play ==
"In my commentating career Paul Gascoigne was the best English player I ever saw. The way he could go past people, his upper body strength, he had the lot. He could score goals, he could head goals, he could pick a pass like no other England player of his generation and very few since. He was just the complete footballer. And it was all natural. It wasn't because of hours of coaching, he just had it."

— Former BBC football commentator John Motson.

A creative and technically gifted playmaker who played as an attacking midfielder, Gascoigne was capable both of scoring and setting up goals, due to his passing accuracy, his powerful striking ability, and heading ability. He had pace, physical strength, balance and excellent dribbling skills, which allowed him to protect the ball, beat opponents and withstand physical challenges. He was also an accurate free kick and penalty kick taker. FourFourTwo stated: "A central midfielder with Glenn Hoddle's eye for a pass and Bryan Robson's love of a tackle, Gascoigne could be inconsistent and positionally suspect," but added: "Gascoigne was no smoke-and-mirrors showboater: his creativity was crucial in deciding deadlocked matches."

Gary Lineker described Gascoigne as "the most naturally gifted technical footballer that I played with", who possessed "a sort of impudence" and "great confidence". Lineker added: "You could see he played completely for the love of the game." Steven Gerrard named Gascoigne as his "hero". Gareth Southgate said: "You've got very good players and then there are top players. In my time in the England setup, Paul Gascoigne, Paul Scholes and Wayne Rooney just had that little bit more than all the others. And we are talking high‑level people there, players like Steven Gerrard, Frank Lampard and David Beckham." Former Newcastle United player Lee Clark added: "Gazza had everything. He could dribble, take on players, thread defence-splitting passes through the eye of a needle to the strikers and score incredible goals." José Mourinho said he was "aggressive, very physical, but at the same time [had] very technical, fantastic characteristics that you need to be a top footballer."

FourFourTwo described his performances in the 1990 World Cup as being "as close as the English ever got to the sort of bravura brilliance by which Diego Maradona had dragged the Albiceleste to World Cup glory four years earlier." Football writer Brian Glanville said that Gascoigne displayed "a flair, a superlative technique, a tactical sophistication, seldom matched by an England player since the war." Despite his talent, Gascoigne was also criticised for his erratic behaviour and aggression on the pitch. His turbulent and often unhealthy lifestyle off the pitch, and his tendency to pick up injuries, are thought to have affected his career.

== Personal life ==
Gascoigne married his long-time girlfriend Sheryl Failes in Thundridge, Hertfordshire, in July 1996, after they had been together for around six years. He later admitted to violence towards Sheryl during their marriage. They divorced in early 1999. In 2009, Sheryl published a tell-all book entitled Stronger: My Life Surviving Gazza. Gascoigne had a son, Regan, with Sheryl and also adopted Sheryl's two children from her first marriage, including Bianca.

During the 1990s, Gascoigne, Danny Baker and Chris Evans had a much-publicised friendship, and Gascoigne frequently appeared on their radio and television shows on Talksport and TFI Friday.

In October 2004, Gascoigne announced that he wanted to be referred to as G8, a combination of the first letter of his surname and the number he wore on his football shirt because it "stands for great".

In November 2008, Gascoigne faced a bankruptcy petition over a £200,000 tax bill, having not filed any tax returns for more than two years. On 25 May 2011, he avoided being declared bankrupt by the High Court in London, despite still owing £32,000.

Gascoigne has four autobiographies: Gazza: My Story (with Hunter Davies), published in 2004, Being Gazza: Tackling My Demons (with Hunter Davies and John McKeown), published in 2006; Glorious: My World, Football and Me, published in 2011 and Eight published in 2025. In Gazza: My Story, and in Being Gazza: Tackling My Demons, he refers to treatment for bulimia, obsessive–compulsive disorder (OCD), bipolar disorder, attention deficit hyperactivity disorder and alcoholism. The books also describe his addictive personality, which has led him to develop addictions of varying severity to alcohol, cocaine, chain smoking, gambling, high-caffeine energy drinks, exercise, and junk food. He lives in Poole, Dorset.

=== Mental illness, alcoholism and legal troubles ===
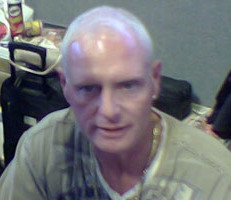
Gascoigne at the Memorabilia convention, Birmingham, April 2006.

Gascoigne first entered therapy sessions in October 1998 when he was admitted into Priory Hospital after a drinking session where he drank 32 shots of whisky, which left him at "rock bottom"; then-manager Bryan Robson signed him into the clinic whilst Gascoigne was unconscious. He was released, at his own insistence, two weeks into the suggested minimum stay of 28 days. His subsequent visits to the Priory became less frequent, and he eventually returned to drinking alcohol. In 2001, Everton's then-chairman Bill Kenwright contacted Gascoigne's therapist at the Priory, John McKeown, who organised more treatment to help Gascoigne to control his drinking. As part of the treatment he was sent to the United States where he had a stay at a clinic in Cottonwood, Arizona. He was diagnosed with bipolar disorder. He stayed at the clinic in 2003 after he suffered low points working in China, and again in 2004 after retiring from football.

In February 2008, Gascoigne was sectioned under the Mental Health Act after an incident at the Malmaison Hotel in Newcastle upon Tyne. He was taken into protective custody to prevent self-harm. He was sectioned again in June, and in September he was hospitalised after he overdosed on alcohol and other drugs in an apparent suicide attempt.

Gascoigne was arrested for a disturbance outside a takeaway in February 2010. The following month, he was charged with drink driving, driving without a licence, and driving without insurance. On 9 July 2010 Gascoigne appeared at the scene of the tense stand-off between the police and the fugitive Raoul Moat, claiming to be Moat's brother and stating that he had brought him "a can of lager, some chicken, a fishing rod, a Newcastle shirt and a dressing gown". He was denied access to Moat. In August 2011, Gascoigne sued The Sun, claiming that its coverage of him during the Raoul Moat incident interrupted his treatment for alcoholism.

In October 2010, Gascoigne was arrested for drink driving. He subsequently admitted being more than four times over the limit at Newcastle upon Tyne Magistrates Court. One day after being warned he could face a prison sentence for drink driving, Gascoigne was arrested for possession of cocaine. He should have appeared in court on 11 November to be sentenced for the drink driving offence. Instead he went into rehab on the south coast of England and was given an eight-week suspended sentence.

In February 2013, his agent, Terry Baker, told BBC Radio 5 Live that Gascoigne had relapsed again: "He won't thank me for saying it but he immediately needs to get help ... His life is always in danger because he is an alcoholic. Maybe no one can save him – I don't know. I really don't know". Gascoigne was placed in intensive care in a U.S. hospital while being treated for alcoholism in Arizona in a rehabilitation programme thanks to financial support provided by ex-cricketer Ronnie Irani and broadcaster Chris Evans. He was arrested for assaulting a railway security guard and being drunk and disorderly at Stevenage railway station on 4 July 2013; he was fined £1,000 after admitting the offence, and ordered to pay £100 compensation to the guard.

In January 2014, Gascoigne entered rehab for his alcohol addiction for a seventh time at a £6,000-a-month clinic in Southampton. In August, he was again admitted to hospital in relation to his problems following an incident outside his home. On 23 October 2014, police were called to his home in Poole after he was in a drink binge; he was sectioned under the Mental Health Act the next day and taken to a hospital for a three-day detox.

In October 2015, he was fined and made the subject of a restraining order for harassing an ex-girlfriend and assaulting a photographer. In September 2016, Gascoigne admitted using "threatening or abusive words or behaviour" and was fined £1,000 after telling a racist joke in November 2015 and racially abusing his black bodyguard. On 27 December 2016, Gascoigne was hospitalised with head injuries including broken teeth after being kicked in the back and falling down stairs in a London hotel. His assailant was jailed for 23 weeks and ordered to pay £7,800 compensation.

On 6 January 2017, a spokesman for Gascoigne confirmed that he had entered a rehabilitation centre in a serious effort to stay "alcohol-free" in 2017. On 20 August 2018, Gascoigne was arrested at Durham railway station by British Transport Police for allegedly sexually assaulting a woman on a train. In November 2018, he was charged with sexual assault. The case came to trial at Teesside Crown Court in October 2019, where he was cleared of sexual assault after he called the complainant a "fat lass" and told the court he had only given her a "peck on the lips" to "boost her confidence" and that there was no sexual intention.

=== Phone hacking by Mirror Group Newspapers ===
Gascoigne's mobile telephone was repeatedly hacked by Mirror Group Newspapers (MGN), the publishers of the Daily Mirror, Sunday Mirror and The People newspapers. In a 2015 court appearance, Gascoigne said that the hacking of his phone led to him developing severe paranoia and alcoholism. Gascoigne described the hacking as " ... just horrendous. And people can't understand why I became an alcoholic". At the time of the hacking, Gascoigne's therapist had attributed his belief in the hacking to paranoia. Gascoigne said " ... I'd like to trade my mobile in for a coffin because those guys have ruined my life. Left me in a state". From 2000 to 2010, 18 articles were published because his phone was hacked in the Daily Mirror, Sunday Mirror, and The People newspapers. Gascoigne had alcoholism during this period and contemplated suicide. Gascoigne received £188,250 in damages from Mirror Group Newspapers in 2015.

== Career statistics ==
=== Club ===
Appearances and goals by club, season and competition
Club	Season	League			National cup (Note: Includes FA Cup, Coppa Italia, Scottish Cup, Chinese FA Cup)		League cup (Note: Includes Football League Cup, Scottish League Cup)		Continental		Total	
Club	Season	Division	Apps	Goals	Apps	Goals	Apps	Goals	Apps	Goals	Apps	Goals
Newcastle United	1984–85	First Division	2	0	–		–		–		2	0
Newcastle United	1985–86	First Division	31	9	1	0	3	0	–		35	9
Newcastle United	1986–87	First Division	24	5	–		2	0	–		26	5
Newcastle United	1987–88	First Division	35	7	3	3	3	1	–		41	11
Newcastle United	Total		92	21	4	3	8	1	–		104	25
Tottenham Hotspur	1988–89	First Division	32	6	–		5	1	–		37	7
Tottenham Hotspur	1989–90	First Division	34	6	–		4	1	–		38	7
Tottenham Hotspur	1990–91	First Division	26	7	6	6	5	6	–		37	19
Tottenham Hotspur	1991–92	First Division	0	0	0	0	0	0	0	0	0	0
Tottenham Hotspur	Total		92	19	6	6	14	8	0	0	112	33
Lazio	1992–93	Serie A	22	4	4	0	–		–		26	4
Lazio	1993–94	Serie A	17	2	0	0	–		0	0	17	2
Lazio	1994–95	Serie A	4	0	0	0	–		0	0	4	0
Lazio	Total		43	6	4	0	–		0	0	47	6
Rangers	1995–96	Scottish Premier Division	28	14	4	3	3	1	7 (Note: Appearance(s) in European Cup)	1	42	19
Rangers	1996–97	Scottish Premier Division	26	13	1	0	4	3	3	1	34	17
Rangers	1997–98	Scottish Premier Division	20	3	3	0	–		5 (Note: Appearances in European Cup and UEFA Cup)	0	28	3
Rangers	Total		74	30	8	3	7	4	15	2	104	39
Middlesbrough	1997–98	First Division	7	0	–		1	0	–		8	0
Middlesbrough	1998–99	Premier League	26	3	1	0	2	0	–		29	3
Middlesbrough	1999–2000	Premier League	8	1	1	0	2	0	–		11	1
Middlesbrough	Total		41	4	2	0	5	0	–		48	4
Everton	2000–01	Premier League	14	0	–		1	0	–		15	0
Everton	2001–02	Premier League	18	1	4	0	1	0	–		23	1
Everton	Total		32	1	4	0	2	0	–		38	1
Burnley	2001–02	First Division	6	0	–		–		–		6	0
Gansu Tianma	2003	China League One	4	2	–		–		–		4	2
Boston United	2004–05	League Two	4	0	–		1	0	–		5	0
Career total			388	83	28	12	37	13	15	2	468	110

=== International ===
Appearances and goals by national team and year
National team	Year	Apps	Goals
England	1988	2	0
England	1989	4	1
England	1990	13	1
England	1991	1	0
England	1992	2	2
England	1993	6	2
England	1994	1	0
England	1995	6	0
England	1996	11	3
England	1997	8	1
England	1998	3	0
Total		57	10

Scores and results list England's goal tally first, score column indicates score after each Gascoigne goal

List of international goals scored by Paul Gascoigne
No.	Date	Venue	Opponent	Score	Result	Competition
1	26 April 1989	Wembley Stadium, London, England	Albania	5–0	5–0	1990 FIFA World Cup qualifier
2	25 April 1990	Wembley Stadium, London, England	Czechoslovakia	4-2	4–2	Friendly
3	18 November 1992	Wembley Stadium, London, England	Turkey	1–0	4–0	1994 FIFA World Cup qualifier
4	18 November 1992	Wembley Stadium, London, England	Turkey	4–0	4–0	1994 FIFA World Cup qualifier
5	31 March 1993	İzmir Atatürk Stadium, İzmir, Turkey	Turkey	2–0	2–0	1994 FIFA World Cup qualifier
6	8 September 1993	Wembley Stadium, London, England	Poland	2–0	3–0	1994 FIFA World Cup qualifier
7	23 May 1996	Workers' Stadium, Beijing, China	China	3–0	3–0	Friendly
8	15 June 1996	Wembley Stadium, London, England	Scotland	2–0	2–0	UEFA Euro 1996
9	1 September 1996	Republican Stadium, Chișinău, Moldova	Moldova	2–0	3–0	1998 FIFA World Cup qualifier
10	10 September 1997	Wembley Stadium, London, England	Moldova	3–0	4–0	1998 FIFA World Cup qualifier

== Honours ==
Newcastle United Youth

- FA Youth Cup: 1984–85

Tottenham Hotspur

- FA Cup: 1990–91

Rangers

- Scottish Premier Division: 1995–96, 1996–97
- Scottish Cup: 1995–96
- Scottish League Cup: 1996–97

Middlesbrough

- Football League Cup runner-up: 1997–98

Individual

- PFA Young Player of the Year: 1987–88
- PFA Team of the Year: 1987–88 First Division, 1990–91 First Division
- Newcastle United Player of the Year: 1987–88
- Barclays Young Eagle: 1988
- Ballon d'Or 1990: Fourth place
- FIFA World Cup All-Star Team: 1990
- BBC Sports Personality of the Year: 1990
- Tottenham Hotspur Player of the Year: 1990
- EFL Cup top scorer: 1990–91
- BBC Goal of the Season: 1990–91
- PFA Scotland Players' Player of the Year: 1995–96
- SFWA Footballer of the Year: 1995–96
- SPFA Goal of the Season: 1995–96
- UEFA European Championship Team of the Tournament: 1996
- English Football Hall of Fame Inductee: 2002
- Rangers Hall of Fame Inductee: 2006

== Bibliography ==
- Charlton, Jack; Byrne, Peter (1996), The Autobiography, Partridge Press, ISBN 1-85225-256-1
- Clark, Lee (2016). Black or White No Grey Areas. Newcastle: Mojo Risin' Publishing. ISBN 9780993442452.
- Ferris, Paul (2018). The Boy on the Shed. United Kingdom: Hodder & Stoughton. ISBN 9781473666726.
- Gascoigne, Paul; Davies, Hunter (2004). Gazza: My Story. London: Headline Publishing. ISBN 0-7472-7118-6.
- Gascoigne, Paul; McKeown, John; Davies, Hunter (2006). Being Gazza: Tackling My Demons. London: Headline Publishing. ISBN 0-7553-1542-1.
- Gascoigne, Paul (2014). Gazza: My Story. United Kingdom: Hachette. ISBN 9781472220639.
- Jones, Vinnie (26 September 2013). It's Been Emotional. United Kingdom: Simon and Schuster. ISBN 9781471127601.
- Fourfourtwo staff (17 April 2018). "Gazza, the untold stories: the need-to-know tales that launched a legend". fourfourtwo.
- Gattuso, Gennaro (5 April 2018). "Gennaro Gattuso, Blue Ranger". fourfourtwo.
- "Gazza adhd".
