= Kenny Wharton =

English footballer and manager

Personal information
- Full name: Kenneth Wharton
- Date of birth: 28 November 1960 (age 65)
- Place of birth: Newcastle upon Tyne, England
- Height: 5 ft 7 in (1.70 m)
- Positions: Left-back; midfielder

Youth career
- 1975–1978: Newcastle United

Senior career*
Years	Team	Apps	(Gls)
1978–1989	Newcastle United	290	(26)
1989–1990	Carlisle United	1	(0)
1989–1990	Bradford City	5	(0)
1989–1990	Berwick Rangers	2	(1)
Total		298	(27)
- * Club domestic league appearances and goals

Kenneth Wharton (born 28 November 1960) is an English former professional footballer, who is the manager of Newcastle Blue Star FC.

== Playing career ==
Wharton left school at 15 and captained Newcastle Schoolboys before joining his hometown club Newcastle United on a part-time basis in 1978, turning professional a year later when Bill McGarry was in charge. Wharton went on to make 290 league appearances—335 in all competitions—and also scored 26 goals.

External videos
- Wharton sitting on the ball 2 April 1988

On 2 April 1988, Wharton sat on the ball in a 4–0 victory over Luton Town. He was joined in the show boating by Paul Gascoigne, who did some kick ups, and others such a Gary Kelly, Glen Roeder, John Anderson and Brian Tinnion. This showboating was in turn justified by Wharton and his teammates as a response to what Luton had done to Newcastle earlier in the season in Luton's victory at Kenilworth Road.

In 1989, he was transferred to Carlisle United. He also played five times for Bradford City before ending his playing career with Berwick Rangers.

== Coaching career ==
In 1989, a knee injury cut short his playing career and Wharton worked for a short period in the Probation Service before getting the opportunity to get back into football with St Johnstone, working under John McClelland.

Middlesbrough then offered Wharton a part-time job as coach to their first team, this later became full-time and he graduated to their under 19s, working very successfully with a number of players who later were to progress to the first team.

Wharton returned to Newcastle in 1999 and worked in tandem with former academy director Alan Irvine. In 2002, Wharton was promoted from assistant academy director to academy director, taking over from Alan Irvine who left to join Everton as assistant manager to David Moyes.

In October 2004, following restructuring of the academy personnel, John Carver took over as academy director and Wharton assumed the role of academy coach. During the 2003–04 season, Wharton also joined the reserve team coaching staff. In May 2010 Wharton was released from Newcastle Utd under allegations of bullying. In October 2010 Wharton was named Director of Coaching at Halifax City S.C. in Nova Scotia, Canada.

Wharton currently coaches at Newcastle Blue Star and is the first team manager.
