= John Pickering (footballer) =

English footballer

Personal information
- Date of birth: 7 November 1944
- Place of birth: Stockton-on-Tees, England
- Date of death: 30 May 2001 (aged 56)
- Position: Centre-back

Youth career
- –1965: Newcastle United

Senior career*
Years	Team	Apps	(Gls)
1965–1974	Halifax Town	367	(5)
1974–1975	Barnsley	43	(2)
Total		410	(7)

Managerial career
- 1978–1979: Blackburn Rovers
- 1985–1986: Lincoln City
- * Club domestic league appearances and goals

John Pickering (7 November 1944 – 30 May 2001) was an English professional footballer who played as a central defender. He was at Halifax Town from 1965 to 1974 and spent one season with Barnsley. He coached Blackburn Rovers, Carlisle United, Lincoln City, Newcastle United and Middlesbrough, and also had short spells as manager at both Blackburn and Lincoln.

== Playing career ==
Born in Stockton-on-Tees, John was raised in Thornaby-on-Tees where he attended Arthur Head School. He served his apprenticeship with Newcastle United but failed to make the first team and moved on to join Halifax Town in September 1965 for a fee of £1,250. A tough and uncompromising centre-half, he was a mainstay of the Halifax team during his nine years at the club. He was captain of the promotion winning team of 1969 and went on to make a record breaking total of 413 league and cup appearances for the club, including one run of 190 consecutive games. This achieved a notable family double as his uncle Barry Jackson holds the appearance record for York City.

He left Halifax in 1973–74, having made 367 League appearances, and joined Barnsley.

== Coaching career ==
His coaching career involved the Blackburn Rovers, Carlisle United, Lincoln City, Newcastle United and Middlesbrough. He also was briefly a manager at both Blackburn and Lincoln.

He spent over ten years coaching with Middlesbrough, initially with the first team before moving to Boro's academy in 1998. He was caretaker manager of Middlesbrough for the final game of the 1993–94 season, steering the team to a 5–2 victory at Charlton Athletic and his service to Middlesbrough was recognised when Bryan Robson gave him the honour of leading the team out at Wembley for the League Cup final against Chelsea.

He died in May 2001 after a long illness.
