= Stan Seymour Jr. =

Scottish football administrator

Stan Seymour Jr
- Born: Scotland
- Died: 4 November 1992; Birmingham
- Known for: Former chairman of Newcastle United
- Father: Stan Seymour

George Stanley Seymour Jr was a former chairman of Newcastle United and the son of Stan Seymour Sr.

== Career ==
Born the son of Stan Seymour Sr in Scotland, he managed a sports shop in Newcastle upon Tyne.

Seymour inherited his fathers' shareholding in Newcastle United, was appointed to the board of the company in April 1976, and went on to be chairman in March 1981. He stopped manager Arthur Cox from spending large amounts on acquiring players, worked hard to improve the financial position of the club and halted a takeover by businessman, Ernie Clay. However, he also brought Kevin Keegan to Newcastle in 1982. He resigned as chairman as in 1988 and died at Birmingham in November 1992.
