= Colin Suggett =

English footballer and manager

Personal information
- Full name: Colin Suggett
- Date of birth: 30 December 1948 (age 77)
- Place of birth: Chester-le-Street, England
- Height: 5 ft 8 in (1.73 m)
- Position: Midfielder

Youth career
- Sunderland

Senior career*
| Years | Team | Apps | (Gls) |
| 1966–1969 | Sunderland | 86 | (24) |
| 1969–1973 | West Bromwich Albion | 128 | (20) |
| 1973–1978 | Norwich City | 203 | (21) |
| 1978–1979 | Newcastle United | 24 | (0) |
| Total | | 441 | (65) |

International career
- England Schools
- England Youth

Managerial career
- 1988: Newcastle United (caretaker)
- * Club domestic league appearances and goals

Colin Suggett (born 30 December 1948) is an English former professional football player and manager. He played as a midfielder in the Football League for Sunderland, West Bromwich Albion, Norwich City and Newcastle United.

== Career ==
Born in Chester-le-Street, Suggett began his career as an apprentice at Sunderland, with whom he twice won the FA Youth Cup. He represented England Schools, and later the England Youth team.

He moved to West Bromwich Albion in July 1969 for a club record fee of £100,000. He then joined Norwich for a £70,000 fee in February 1973. He was voted Norwich City player of the year in 1975.

He later worked as a youth coach at Sunderland's fierce rivals Newcastle United, coaching such players as Neil McDonald. Suggett also enjoyed a brief spell as caretaker manager at the club, following Willie McFaul's departure in 1988.

In 2006, he was working as chief scout at Carlisle United, where he again joined up with manager Neil McDonald. Prior to this he was chief scout at Ipswich Town.

== Honours ==
West Bromwich Albion

- Football League Cup runner-up: 1969–70

Norwich City

- Football League Cup runner-up: 1974–75
