= Iam McFaul =

Northern Irish footballer (1943–2025)

Personal information
- Full name: William Stewart McFaul
- Date of birth: 1 October 1943
- Place of birth: Coleraine, Northern Ireland
- Date of death: 4 October 2025 (aged 82)
- Height: 5 ft 9 in (1.75 m)
- Position: Goalkeeper

Senior career*
Years	Team	Apps	(Gls)
1961–1966	Linfield		
1966–1975	Newcastle United	290	(0)

International career
	Northern Ireland	6	(0)

Managerial career
- 1985–1988: Newcastle United
- 1989–1992: Coleraine
- 1998–2003: Guam
- * Club domestic league appearances and goals

William Stewart "Iam" McFaul (1 October 1943 – 4 October 2025) was a Northern Irish football player and coach. He spent most of his career with Newcastle United.

== Playing career ==
McFaul was born in Coleraine on 1 October 1943. He joined Newcastle United from Linfield in 1966 after impressing in a friendly match. It took two years for him to establish himself as Newcastle's goalkeeper, a position he held until after the 1974–75 season; he made 386 appearances for the club. A notable moment in his career came when he helped Newcastle to the 1974 FA Cup Final at Wembley. Newcastle were beaten 3–0 by Liverpool, whose first two goals were from shots by Kevin Keegan and Steve Heighway that McFaul got his fingertips to but was unable to stop. McFaul won only six caps for Northern Ireland, the goalkeeping position being held by Pat Jennings, one of the era's finest goalkeepers. McFaul was part of the Newcastle team that won the Inter-Cities Fairs Cup in 1969.

== Coaching career ==
McFaul was appointed caretaker manager of Newcastle United in August 1985 after Jack Charlton had resigned. He gave Paul Gascoigne his first-team debut.

== Radio work ==
McFaul was an occasional summariser on BBC Northern Ireland's coverage of the Irish League.

== Death ==
McFaul died on 4 October 2025, at the age of 82.

== Honours ==
Newcastle United

- Fairs Cup: 1969
- FA Cup runner-up: 1973–74
