= History of Newcastle United F.C. =

History of an English football club

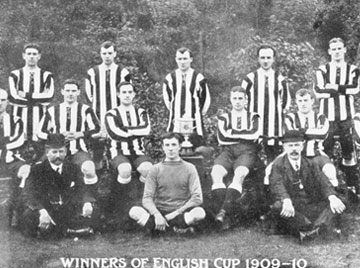
Newcastle's 1910 FA Cup winning team

The history of Newcastle United Football Club, an English professional association football club based in Newcastle upon Tyne, North East England, covers the club's entire history from its formation to the present day. Formed by a merger between Newcastle East End and Newcastle West End to become 'United' in 1892, the club was elected to the Football League, which they entered in 1893.

Newcastle are England's 9th most successful club of all time. They have been English champions four times (in 1905, 1907, 1909, 1927) and FA Cup winners six times (in 1910, 1924, 1932, 1951, 1952, 1955). They also won the Football League Cup in 2025, their first major domestic trophy of the 21st century. The club have also won the 1909 Charity Shield, the 1968–69 Inter-Cities Fairs Cup, and the 2006 Intertoto Cup. Newcastle have reached the League Cup final three times, finishing runners-up in (1976 and 2023) before winning in 2025. They have played in England's top league from 1898–1934, 1948–61, 1965–78, 1984–89, 1993–2009, 2010–2016, and 2017–present, playing in the second tier at all other times.

== The creation (1881–1895) ==
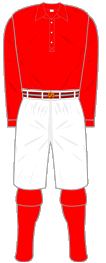
Club kit, 1892–94

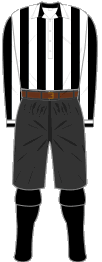
Kit, 1894–97

The first record of football being played on Tyneside dates from 3 March 1877 at Elswick Rugby Club. Later that year, Newcastle's first association football club, Tyne Association, was formed. The origins of Newcastle United Football Club itself can be traced back to the formation of a football club by the Stanley Cricket Club of Byker in November 1881. They won their first match 5–0 against Elswick Leather Works 2nd XI. The team was renamed Newcastle East End F.C. in October 1882, to avoid confusion with the cricket club in Stanley, County Durham.

Shortly after this, another Byker side, Rosewood FC, merged with East End to form an even stronger side. Meanwhile, across the city, West End Cricket Club began to take an interest in football and in August 1882, they formed Newcastle West End F.C. West End played their early football on their cricket pitch, but in May 1886, the club moved into St James' Park. The two clubs became rivals in the Northern League. In 1889, Newcastle East End became a professional team, before becoming a limited company the following March.

West End soon became the city's premier club. East End were anxious not to be left behind and lured Tom Watson into becoming the club secretary/manager in the close season of 1888 and from that point, never looked back; Watson made several good signings, especially from Scotland, and the Heaton club went from strength to strength, while West End's fortunes slipped dramatically.

The region's first league competition was formed in 1889 and the FA Cup began to cause interest. Ambitious East End turned professional in 1889, a huge step for a local club, and in March 1890, they made an even more adventurous move by becoming a limited company with capital of 1,000 pounds in ten shilling notes. During the spring of 1892, in a season during which their results were at an all-time low, and in which they had lost to their bitter rivals, East End, five times, West End found themselves in serious trouble. They approached East End with a view to a take over, the directors having decided that the club could no longer continue.

What actually happened was that West End wound up, while some of its players and most of its backroom staff joined East End. East End also took over the lease on St. James' Park in May 1892.

With only one senior club in the city for fans to support, development of the club was much more rapid. Despite being refused entry to the Football League's First Division at the start of the 1892–93 season, they were invited to play in their new Second Division. However, with no big names playing in the Second Division, they turned down the offer and remained in the Northern League, stating "gates would not meet the heavy expenses incurred for travelling". In a bid to start drawing larger crowds, Newcastle East End decided to adopt a new name in recognition of the merger. Suggested names included Newcastle F.C., Newcastle Rangers, Newcastle City and City of Newcastle, but Newcastle United was decided upon on 9 December 1892, to signify the unification of the two teams. The name change was accepted by the Football Association on 22 December, but the club was not legally constituted as Newcastle United Football Club Co. Ltd. until 6 September 1895. At the start of the 1893–94 season, Newcastle United were once again refused entry to the First Division and so joined the Second Division, along with Liverpool and Woolwich Arsenal. They played their first competitive match in the division that September against Woolwich Arsenal, with a score of 2–2.

== The first glory era (1895–1914) ==
Turnstile numbers were still low, and the incensed club published a statement claiming "The Newcastle public do not deserve to be catered for as far as professional football is concerned". However, eventually figures picked up by 1895–96, when 14,000 fans watched the team play Bury. That season Frank Watt became secretary of the club, and he was instrumental in promotion to the First Division for the 1898–99 season. However, they lost their first game 4–2 at home to Wolves and finished their first season in thirteenth place.

In 1903–04, the club built up a promising squad of players, and went on to dominate English football for almost a decade, the team known for their "artistic play, combining team-work and quick, short passing". Newcastle started to purchase talented players, especially from Scotland, and soon had a squad to rival all of England. With players like Colin Veitch, Jackie Rutherford, Jimmy Lawrence and Albert Shepherd, Newcastle had a team of international talent. Bill McCracken, Jimmy Howie, Peter McWilliam and Andy Aitken were also household names in their day. Long after his retirement, defender Peter McWilliam said "The Newcastle team of the 1900s would give any modern side a two goal start and beat them, and further more, beat them at a trot".

Newcastle United went on to win the League on three occasions during the 1900s: in 1904–05, 1906–07 and 1908–09. Newcastle reached five FA Cup finals in the years leading up to World War I. In 1904–05, they nearly did the double, losing to Aston Villa in the 1905 FA Cup Final. They were beaten again the following year by Everton in the 1906 FA Cup Final. They reached the final again in 1908 where they lost to Wolves. In 1908 the team suffered a record 9–1 home defeat to local rivals Sunderland in the league but still won that season's league title. They finally won the FA Cup in 1910 when they beat Barnsley in the final. They lost again the following year in the final against Bradford City.

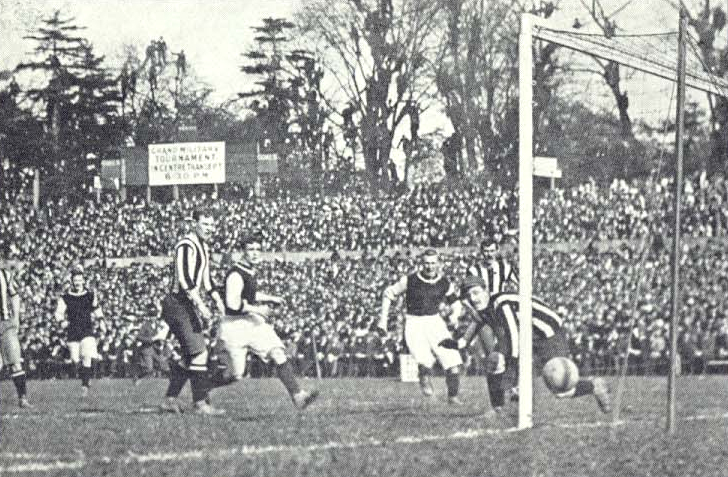
Against Aston Villa in the 1905 FA Cup final

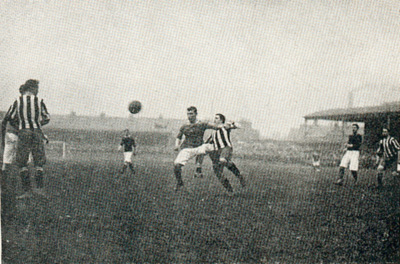
Against Woolwich Arsenal, 1906 semi-final

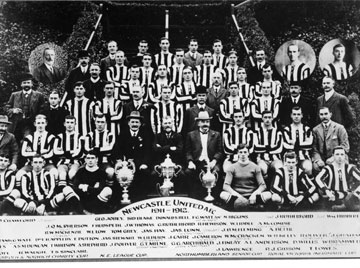
1911–12 "Newcastle United AFC" squad

== Interwar success (1919–1939) ==
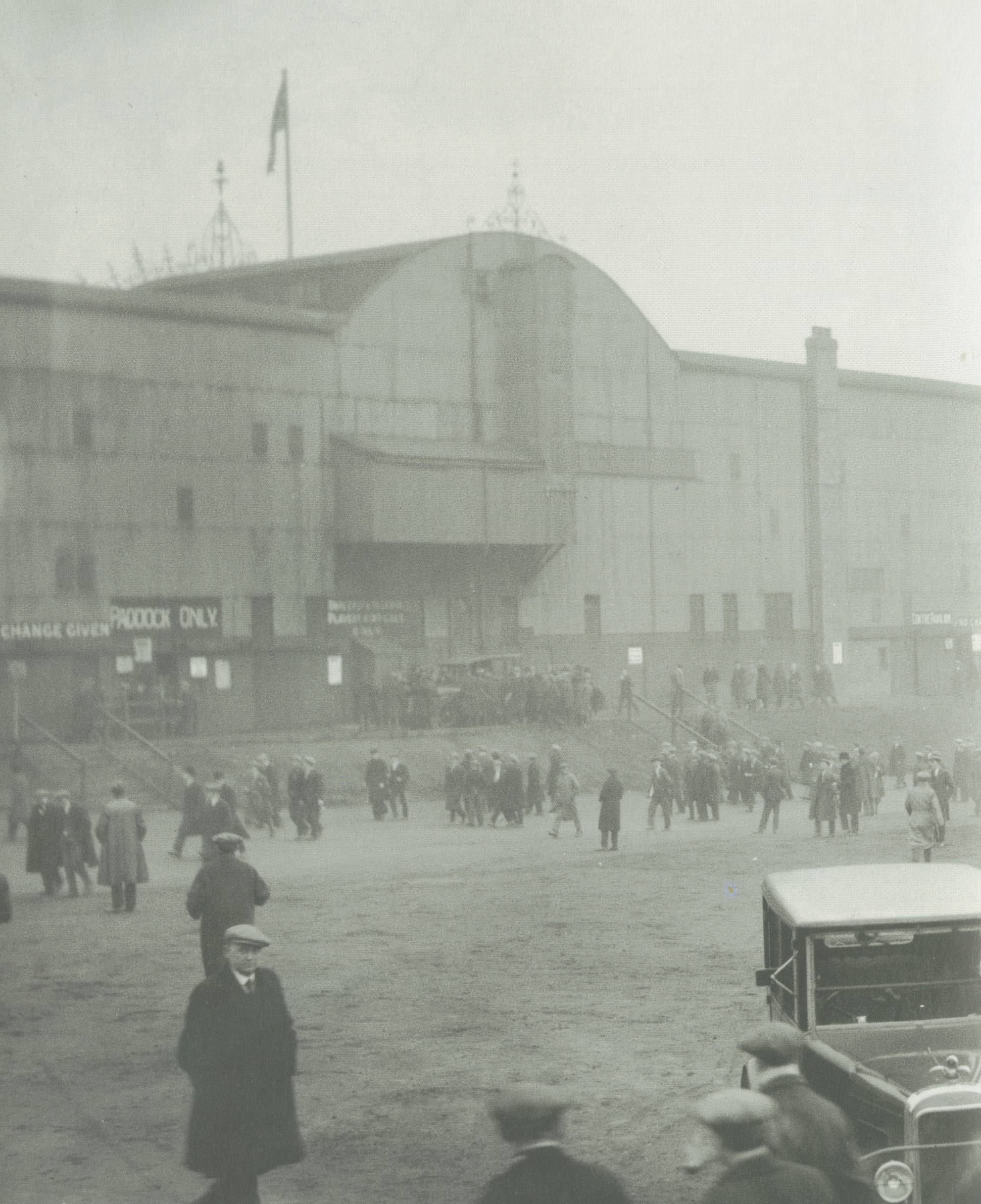
St James' Park, 1930

The team returned to the FA Cup final in 1924, in the second final held at the then new Wembley Stadium. They defeated Aston Villa, winning the club's second FA Cup. Three years later they won the First Division championship a fourth time in 1926–27. Record signing & Scottish international centre-forward Hughie Gallacher, one of the most prolific goal scorers in the club's history, captained the championship-winning team. Other key players in this period were Neil Harris, Stan Seymour and Frank Hudspeth. Seymour was to become an influential figure for the next 40 years as player, manager and director.

In 1930, Newcastle United came close to relegation, and at the end of the season Gallacher left the club for Chelsea, and at the same time Andy Cunningham became the club's first team manager. In 1931–32, the club won the FA Cup a third time in the infamous 'Over the Line' final. United won the game 2–1 after scoring a goal following a cross from Jimmy Richardson which appeared to be hit from out of play - over the line. There were no action replays then and the referee allowed the goal, a controversial talking point in FA Cup history.

Newcastle boasted master players like Sam Weaver and Jack Allen, as well as the first player-manager in the top division in Scottish international Andy Cunningham. But at the end of the 1933–34 season, the team were relegated to the Second Division after 32 seasons in the First. Cunningham left as manager and Tom Mather took over. Amazingly in the same season as they fell into the Second Division, United defeated Liverpool 9–2 and Everton 7–3 within the space of a week.

The club found it difficult to adjust to the Second Division and were nearly further relegated in the 1937–38 season, when they were spared on goal averages.

== The Wartime League (1939–1946) ==
When World War II broke in 1939, Newcastle had a chance to regroup, and in the War period, they brought in Jackie Milburn, Tommy Walker and Bobby Cowell.

Newcastle United won no Wartime League trophies, but Jackie Milburn made his debut in 1943 in a "Stripes vs Blues" match. Milburn's side was losing at half-time 3–0, but following a switch from midfielder to centre forward, he scored 6 goals to help them win the match 9–3. Jackie went on to score 38 goals in the next 3 years of the league's life.

== Postwar cup-winners (1946–1978) ==
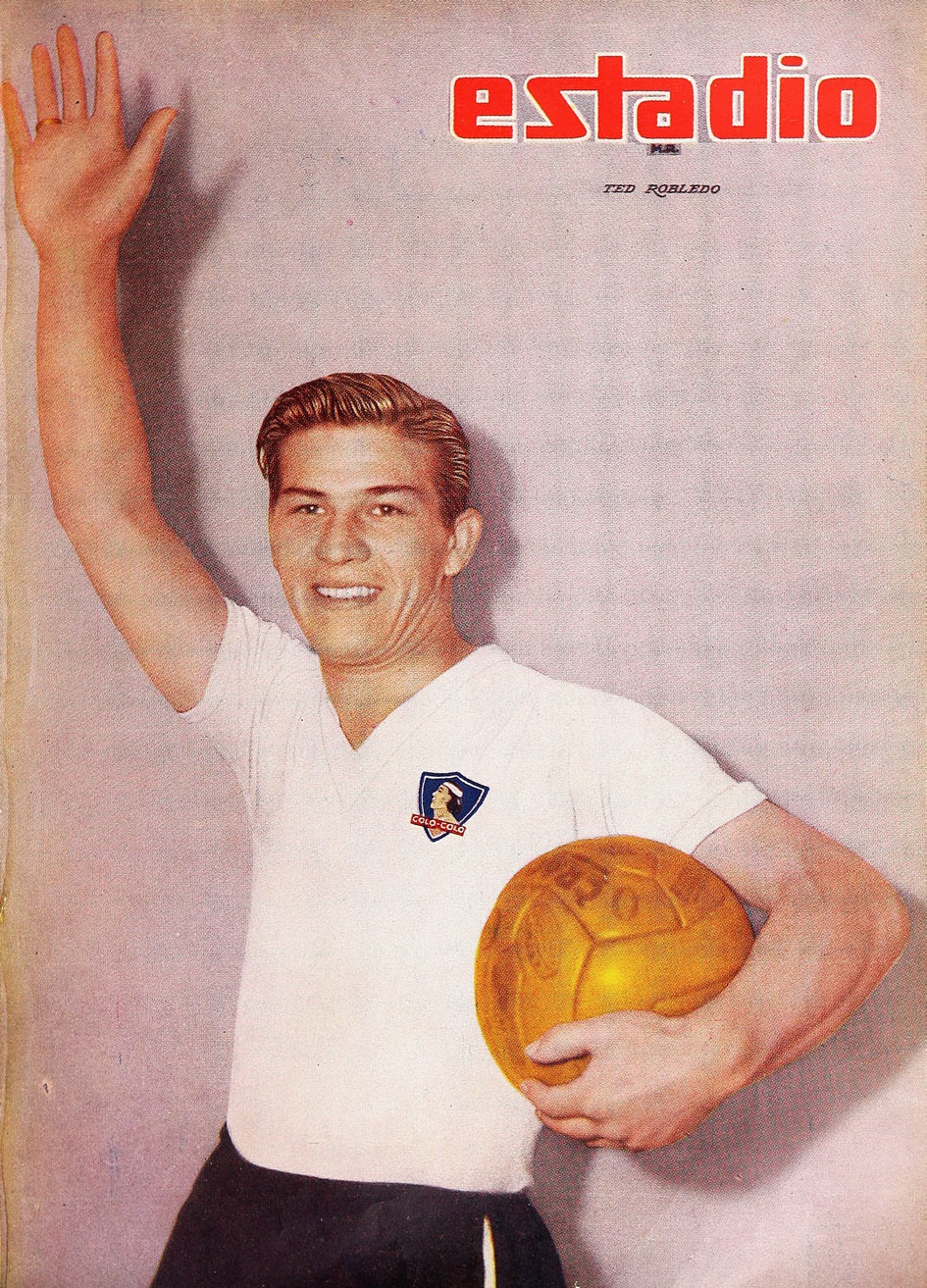
Ted Robledo, 1953; he appeared in the 1952 FA Cup Final-winning side alongside his brother George.

By the time peace was restored in 1945, Seymour ensured that the Magpies possessed a mix of home-grown talent like Jackie Milburn, Bobby Cowell and Ernie Taylor, as well as big signings in the shape of George Robledo, Bobby Mitchell, Joe Harvey, Len Shackleton and Frank Brennan.

Newcastle spent the first couple of years post-war in the Second Division. Crowds were extremely high after the return to football, and in 1946 Newcastle recorded the joint-highest victory in English League Football history, defeating Newport County 13–0. Len Shackleton, playing his debut in that match, scored 6 goals in the match, another record for Newcastle United.

Newcastle returned to the First Division in double of the time. Promotion was achieved in 1948 in front of vast crowds. An average of almost 57,000 at every home game saw United's fixtures that year, a national record for years to come. That was just the start of another period of success.

During the Fifties decade United lifted the FA Cup trophy on three occasions within a five-year period. In 1951 they defeated Blackpool 2–0, a year later Arsenal were beaten 1–0 and in 1955 United crushed Manchester City 3–1. The Magpies were known in every corner of the country, and so were their players; 'Wor Jackie' Milburn and Bobby 'Dazzler' Mitchell the pick of a side that was renowned the nation over. Other players of this time were Frank Brennan (like Mitchell a Scot), Ivor Broadis, Len White and Welshman Ivor Allchurch.

Despite having quality players throughout the era, stars like Allchurch, White and George Eastham during the latter years of the decade, United slipped from the First Division in 1961 under the controversial management of ex-Manchester United star, Charlie Mitten. It was a huge blow to the club.

An old war-horse returned to revitalise the Magpies in the shape of Joe Harvey, who had captained the club to much of their post-war success. He worked alongside Stan Seymour to rebuild the United and the 'Black'n'Whites' returned to the elite as Second Division Champions in 1965. Following this, United became unpredictable, often capable of defeating the best, but unaware of their potential until recently.

Joe Harvey's side qualified for Europe for the first time in 1968 and stunned everyone the following year by lifting the Inter Cities Fairs Cup; the forerunner of the UEFA Cup. United possessed a solid eleven and Newcastle's tradition of fielding a famous Number 9 at centre-forward since earliest years continued as big Welshman Wyn Davies was prominent along with the likes of Pop Robson, Bobby Moncur and Frank Clark.

In the years that followed European success, manager Harvey brought new players to the team including, people like Jimmy Smith, Tony Green, Terry Hibbitt, and Malcolm Macdonald.

Nicknamed 'Supermac', Macdonald was one of United's greatest hero figures. Brash, arrogant and devastating in front of goal, he led United's attack to Wembley in 1974, against Liverpool in the FA Cup. But the Magpies failed to bring the trophy back to Tyneside, and a complete lack of success in any of the competitions the next season resulted in Joe Harvey being sacked in mid-1975.

Blackburn manager Gordon Lee was appointed to replace Harvey, and despite a mediocre league campaign in 1975–76, led the club to its first League Cup final, which ended in defeat by Manchester City. Despite Macdonald controversially being sold to Arsenal for a cut price deal, the following season saw United's best League campaign for years, and by Christmas the club looked to have an outside chance of winning the title. However, Lee walked out on the club to take over at Everton at the start of 1977, and inexperienced coach Richard Dinnis was put in charge of the team after the players demanded that he be given the job. United's form initially remained quite consistent under Dinnis, and they secured 5th place and a UEFA Cup spot at the end of the season. However, the team totally fell apart the following season, and Dinnis was sacked after a run of ten straight League defeats and a thumping UEFA Cup exit at the hands of French team SC Bastia. Bill McGarry took over as manager, but was powerless to prevent United from being relegated in statistically their worst season ever. The only mercy they had was Leicester City's terrible goal difference preventing United from finishing bottom of the table.

== Bouncing between divisions (1978–1992) ==
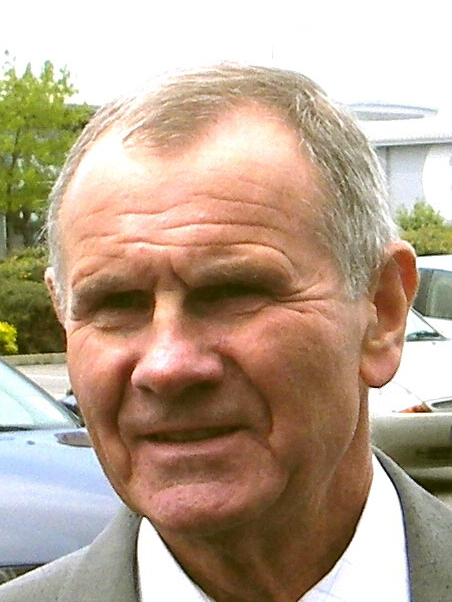
Arthur Cox

McGarry remained in charge of the club, but only managed two midtable finishes before being sacked in the wake of an uninspiring start to the 1980–81 season, and it was his successor Arthur Cox who steered United back again to the First Division with ex England captain Kevin Keegan leading the attack, having joined the Magpies in a sensational deal in 1982.

The football inspired by Keegan captivated Tyneside and United stormed into the top division in a style only bettered by Kevin's own brand of football when he returned to the club as manager a decade later. Cox had also signed young winger Chris Waddle out of non-league football, as well as young striker Peter Beardsley, Liverpool midfielder Terry McDermott and former Manchester United midfielder David McCreery. The club was rocked however when Cox resigned after the board refused to offer him an improved contract in the aftermath of promotion, and, surprisingly, accepted an offer to take charge of Derby County - who had been relegated from the Second Division.

One of English footballs greatest talents, Paul Gascoigne or 'Gazza', emerged as an exciting teenage midfielder in the mid 1980s, under Newcastle's next manager Jack Charlton, who left after only one season despite Newcastle achieving a secure mid-table finish on their return to the First Division. His successor was former player Willie McFaul. Newcastle consolidated their place in the First Division but then a period of selling their best players (Beardsley to Liverpool, and Waddle and eventually Gascoigne both to Tottenham), rocked the club and led to supporter unrest, as did a share-war for control of the boardroom. The effect of this on the pitch soon proved evident, as McFaul was sacked after a dismal start to the 1988–89 season, and new boss Jim Smith was unable to turn Newcastle around, resulting in them finishing at the foot of the First Division in 1989 and dropping back into the Second Division.

Smith then signed Portsmouth striker Mick Quinn and Newcastle began the 1989–90 season on a high note, beating promotion favourites Leeds United 5–2 on the opening day with Quinn scoring four goals, and Newcastle appeared to be on course for a quick return to the First Division. However, they missed out on automatic promotion by one place, before enduring a humiliating play-off exit at the hands of local rivals Sunderland. The intensifying boardroom battle soon took its toll on the club, and Smith resigned in March 1991 with the side stuck in mid-table. Ossie Ardiles became the club's new manager, and despite being initially being the club's most popular manager since Joe Harvey, Newcastle dropped to the bottom of the Second Division in October 1991. Results failed to improve, despite the acquisition of a new striker in David Kelly and the efforts of promising young players including Steve Howey, Steve Watson and Gavin Peacock, and in February 1992 Ardiles was sacked. Despite being the best-supported side in the division and frequently still managing to pull in crowds of more than 20,000, Newcastle were also millions of pounds in debt and faced with the real prospect of third-tier football for the first time ever. A saviour was needed, and in came new chairman John Hall, who offered the manager's job to Kevin Keegan in February 1992. Despite having vowed never to enter management following his retirement as a player, Keegan accepted the offer to manage Newcastle. His first task was to deliver Second Division survival.

== Into the Premier League (1992–2007) ==
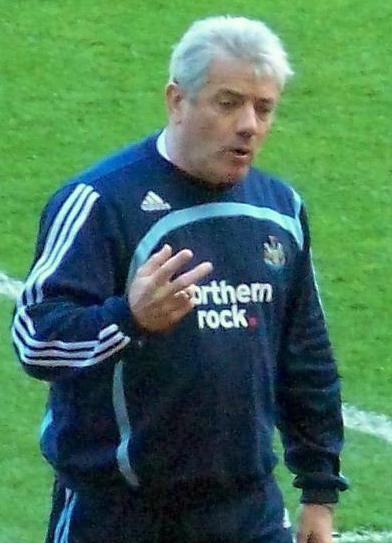
Kevin Keegan, a Newcastle player and twice manager

Kevin Keegan returned as manager in the 1991–92 season, and survived relegation from the Second Division. The club's finances were transformed, with Hall aiming to put Newcastle among Europe's biggest clubs, and signings like Rob Lee and Andy Cole helped Newcastle to promotion the following season, 1992–93, as champions of the new First Division. The finish also secured qualification for the 1993–94 UEFA Cup upon return to the top flight in the 1993–94 Premier League season.

St James' Park was redeveloped during this time into an all-seated stadium with a capacity of 36,000. This increased to 52,000 in the late 1990s, after the rejection of Hall's proposal to build a larger stadium at Castle Leazes.

Keegan stunned fans and critics alike in 1995 when prolific striker Andy Cole was sold to Manchester United in exchange for £6 million and midfielder Keith Gillespie, leaving many to blame the sale to have affected Newcastle's title chances for the 1994–95 season, in which they finished sixth. The club, however, continued to build up a reputation for playing attacking football under Keegan. In the 1995–96 season, high-profile foreign stars David Ginola and Faustino Asprilla, in addition to British players Peter Beardsley and striker Les Ferdinand, guided the team to a second-place finish. During the 1996–97 season, Keegan made one signing, securing the services of England striker Alan Shearer for a then-world record transfer fee of £15 million to produce a shrewd partnership with Les Ferdinand, and claim a 5–0 victory over title rivals Manchester United. whilst remaining in contention to win the league.

With the team having failed to win any trophies under his reign, Keegan resigned as manager on 8 January 1997, saying, "I feel that I have taken the club as far as I can."

Kenny Dalglish replaced Keegan as manager, and maintained the club's good form through to the end of the season, finishing second. In the 1997–98 season, Les Ferdinand and David Ginola both left the club, whilst Alan Shearer broke his ankle in a pre-season friendly, keeping him out for the first half of the season. Dalglish signed Ian Rush, John Barnes, Duncan Ferguson and Stuart Pearce to bolster the squad, and achieved a 3–2 victory over Barcelona in the UEFA Champions League through a Faustino Asprilla hat-trick, but Dalglish's cautious brand of football, as opposed to the attacking style played under Keegan, did not prove successful—the club failed to progress beyond the Champions League group stage, finished 13th in the Premier League, and lost the FA Cup final to Arsenal. Dalglish began the 1998–99 season signing Nolberto Solano and Dietmar Hamann, but was soon dismissed following the club's declining form.

Ruud Gullit replaced him, however the club again finished the league in 13th place and again lost in the FA Cup final, this time to Manchester United F.C. Gullit resigned early in the 1999–2000 season, having fallen out with several senior players, including Alan Shearer and captain Rob Lee. Keith Gillespie later blamed Gullit's arrogance for his failure as manager of the club.

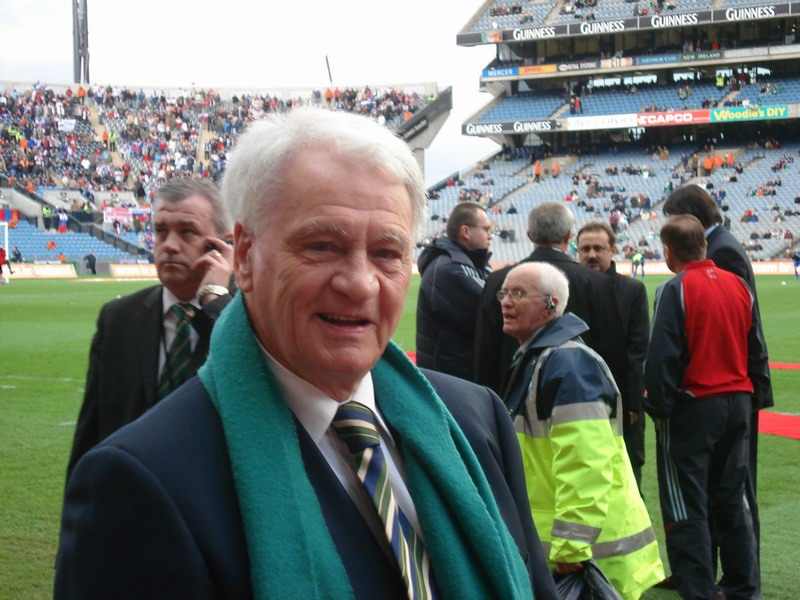
Bobby Robson managed Newcastle from 1999 to 2004.

Ex-England manager Bobby Robson was brought in to replace Gullit in September 1999. He ensured Newcastle's survival in the Premiership, but the club remained in the bottom half of the table, finishing 11th in 1999–2000 and 2000–01. Robson, however, built up an exciting young squad, and an unlikely top four challenge emerged in 2001–02 season—Newcastle finished in fourth place.

Playing in the Champions League in 2002–03, Newcastle progressed to the second group stage in unlikely circumstances, beating Italian squad Juventus 1–0 along the way. United finished the 2002–03 season third in the Premier League, but lost their Champions League qualifier and played in the 2003–04 UEFA Cup instead, reaching the semi-final. In 2003–04, Newcastle finished fifth in the Premiership, lower than in previous seasons, and outside of Champions League contention.

Robson was then sacked following a poor start to the 2004–05 season and alleged discontent in the dressing room. In his autobiography, Robson was critical of Shepherd, claiming that while manager he was denied information regarding the players' contracts and transfer negotiations. He had previously publicly criticised the club's highly financed offer for Wayne Rooney, which the club later claimed they could not afford, stating young players were making excessive demands without first proving themselves on the pitch. He also criticised Shepherd and the club's deputy chairman Douglas Hall for their focus on the first team and St James' Park, causing them to neglect less glamorous issues, such as the training ground, youth development and talent scouts.

Graeme Souness replaced Robson and finished the season 14th in the league. Souness' arrival, however, was met with mixed reactions, with many expecting Robson being a hard task to improve upon, despite insisting he was aware of Sir Bobby's admiration and was ready for the role. In the January transfer window, Souness caused controversy in securing an £8 million bid for France international Jean-Alain Boumsong, who had joined Rangers for free just months before, prior to which Sir Bobby had travelled to France to review Boumsong but declined to sign him. The Stevens inquiry in 2007 documented that in this purchase Souness was accused of lack of consistency and was reviewed over the large media speculation the transfer received, but was eventually exonerated from any illegal participations. Going into 2005–06 season, despite signing several new players, including the return of Nolberto Solano from Aston Villa as well as Albert Luque from Deportivo de La Coruña for £10 million, Souness struggled with the opening games. He later blamed the state of the club's training ground for injuries suffered to players. The signing of Michael Owen (for a club record £17 million from Real Madrid) and his strike partnership with Alan Shearer produced goals at the end of 2005, but an injury caused Owen to miss the rest of the season and following a poor start to the new year, Souness was sacked in February 2006. Robbie Elliiot and Shay Given announced regret over his exit in the club's Season Review DVD but acknowledged his seeming favouritism of players and the amounting pressure on him damaged morale, whilst Alan Shearer blamed the injury crisis to first-team players.

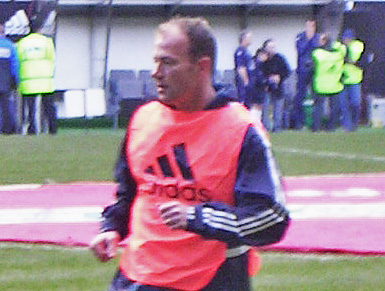
Striker Alan Shearer in 2005

Caretaker manager Glenn Roeder was issued the role of temporary first-team manager, seeing his first game against Portsmouth secure Alan Shearer's 201st goal for Newcastle United, becoming the club's all-time highest-scoring player. Roeder guided Newcastle from 15th to seventh place securing 32 league points from a possible 45 by the end of 2005–06, as well as securing a place in the UEFA Intertoto Cup and was given a two-year contract by chairman Freddy Shepherd. His appointment caused controversy, as at the time he did not hold the necessary UEFA Pro Licence to manage in the UEFA leagues and cup tournaments His role, however, was approved by UEFA who acknowledged that Roeder's diagnosis with a brain tumour in 2003 prevented him from developing his career, whilst Chairman Freddy Shepherd also fulfilled UEFA's request that he gain backing from all 19 other Premier League clubs to appoint him as manager. Alan Shearer retired at the end of the 2005–06 season scoring a record 206 goals.

Roeder encountered a difficult 2006–07 season, losing many players to injury, in particular Michael Owen, who had severely damaged his ligaments during the 2006 FIFA World Cup seeing him only play the final two games of the season. Newcastle won the 2006 Intertoto Cup, but a 5–1 exit to Birmingham City in the FA Cup, a round of 16 exit in the UEFA Cup and poor league results seeing a 13th-place finish led Roeder to resign in May 2007.

== New ownership and relegation (2007–2010) ==
As the 2007 season drew to a close, St James Holdings Limited, the bid vehicle of billionaire businessman Mike Ashley, was reported to be in the process of buying the club. Ashley successfully acquired Sir John Hall's majority stake in the club in May 2007, leaving many to believe chairman Freddie Shepherd was set to depart after stepping down as chairman, should Ashley acquire more than 50 percent, which would see Shepherd no longer in control of the club and Ashley able to replace the board. Shepherd dismissed all speculation and proceeded to appoint ex-Bolton Wanderers boss Sam Allardyce as Newcastle manager, but eventually met with Mike Ashley and the board on 29 May. On 7 June 2007, Shepherd ended his 11 years with the club after Mike Ashley accepted his bid to buy his shares and in his role as chairman of the board, also having Shepherd advise the remaining shareholders to sell to Ashley. Ashley then announced he would be delisting the club from the London Stock Exchange upon completion of the takeover. The club officially ceased trading on the Stock Exchange as of 8 am on 18 July 2007 at 5p a share. Ashley brought in lawyer Chris Mort as the new club "deputy chairman".

Despite signing and building a seemingly strong squad, Sam Allardyce soon became widely unpopular with fans and players alike, and was surprisingly sacked by Ashley halfway through his first season after underwhelming results and pressure from the fans. Ashley, however, defended his decision to sack Allardyce, stating he made a mistake in not appointing his own choice of manager before the season started.

Kevin Keegan then made a sensational surprise return as manager. His return had an instant impact on club ticket sales as he sat with the fans, Mike Ashley and Chris Mort for the FA Cup replay 4–1 win against Stoke City. Following his return, Keegan had a disappointing first ten games back, with the club not winning a single game until his decision to include strikers Obafemi Martins, Michael Owen and Mark Viduka into a 4–3–3 formation, which saw the club back on goal-scoring and winning form and eventually finishing 12th in 2007–08. In May Keegan met with Mike Ashley and Director of Football Dennis Wise after he had suggested Champions League qualification was out of Newcastle United's reach and expressed dissatisfaction with the board's financial backing. Ashley was battling reports that he had lost hundreds of millions of pounds in a disastrous attempt to rescue bank HBOS. The morning following, after the club's 3–0 defeat to Arsenal, rumours were circulating that Keegan had either been sacked or resigned as Newcastle boss, citing board interference and his lack of control over transfers. Keegan confirmed the reports the same week, and reportedly held unsuccessful resolution talks with Mike Ashley the following week, leading to fan fury and protests around St James' Park, and marring the club's home defeat to Hull City, with fans accusing Ashley and club executives Dennis Wise, Tony Jimenez and Derek Llambias of forcing Keegan out.

Following mass media coverage of Keegan's departure, the club struggled to find a replacement, with the majority of managers showing no interest in the role. Ashley released a statement to the club's fans that in fear of his and his families reputation and safety, he was placing the club for sale. It was then announced that former Nottingham Forest manager Joe Kinnear was appointed temporary manager His appointment, however, saw a backlash from fans, prompting a verbal tirade from Kinnear at the media, who questioned his decision to take the job at such a time. By the end of the year, Ashley took the club off the market claiming he was unable to find a suitable buyer.

In the remainder of 2008–09, Kinnear won four out of 18 matches before stepping down due to reported heart problems. Chris Hughton then took temporary charge before Alan Shearer returned to Newcastle United as manager in April with Iain Dowie as his assistant. After winning only one out of eight games, the club was relegated to the Championship for the first time since 1992. Mike Ashley then re-issued his desire to sell the club once again and issued a £100 million sale price tag.

Prior to the start of the 2009–10 season, Keegan's dispute with the club was resolved after a Premier League Arbitration Panel ruled that he had been misled to believe he had the final word on the club's transfer policy when in fact Director of Football Dennis Wise had been handed such control. The signings of Xisco and Nacho González were ruled to have been made without the manager's approval; with González, Dennis Wise signed him only after viewing him off of YouTube. Wise and Derek Llambias were ruled to have deliberately misled the media to believe Keegan had the final say, which amounted to constructive dismissal. Keegan was awarded £2 million in compensation and re-offered his job as Newcastle United manager under fresh new terms, though in response to the offer, he stated the fans had "had enough" for the time being and declined. He stated in 2013 he would consider a return should Mike Ashley leave the club.

== Return to Premier League and second relegation (2010–2016) ==
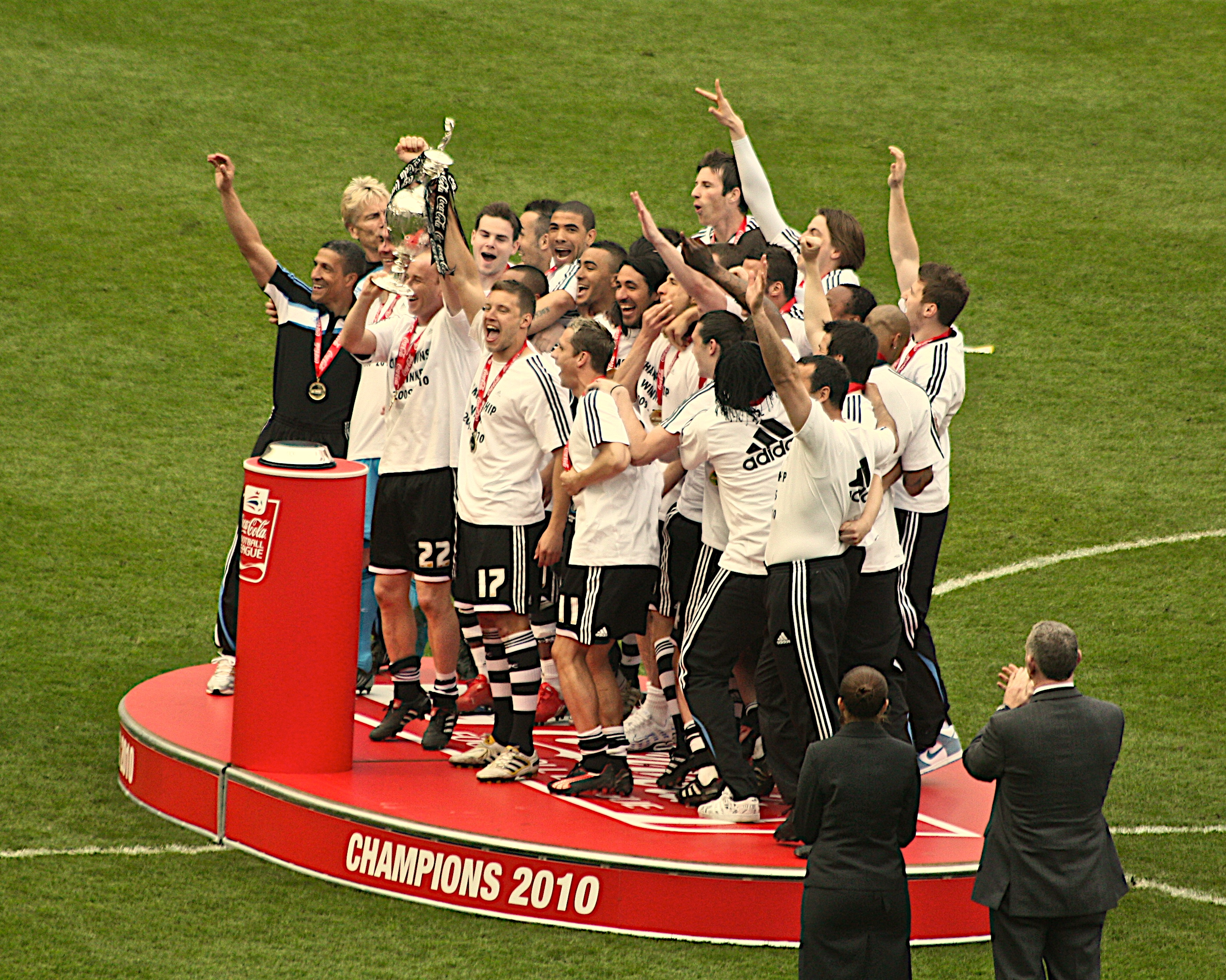
Newcastle players celebrate the club's promotion in 2010.

Chris Hughton was appointed full-time manager early in the 2009–10 season. The club dominated the Championship, winning 30 games, drawing 12 and losing only four, scoring a total of 90 goals and finishing top of the league with 102 points, thus re-gaining Premier League status at the first attempt.

Beginning 2010–11, Hughton remained on course to secure survival from relegation with the club's first win at the Emirates over Arsenal, and a memorable 5–1 defeat over Sunderland. However, fury once again was caused by the board, as the club controversially sacked Chris Hughton after a 3–1 defeat to West Bromwich Albion on 6 December 2010. Critics, players, and fans were shocked by Hughton's dismissal, leading to protests prior to the club's game against Liverpool in a bid to thank him for his work and support. Alan Pardew was then announced as being appointed manager on a five-and-a-half-year contract, with the club announcing they wanted a manager with more experience. Pardew stated he had nothing but respect for Chris Hughton and acknowledged the fact that other managers questioned his appointment. He secured his first win on his debut as manager with a 3–1 win over Liverpool On 31 January 2011, Newcastle sold striker Andy Carroll to Liverpool for a club record of £35 million. The sale of a young player at a high value proved controversial for Liverpool, with Alan Shearer ridiculing the price Liverpool paid as well as expressing sorrow at Newcastle for losing Carroll. Carroll himself stated that he did not want to leave the club but was forced out by the club's directors after Liverpool's final offer of £35 million; the board responded that Carroll had previously handed in a transfer request. Pardew said he was disappointed to lose Carroll, but pledged to invest in the club's summer transfer window. The remainder of the season saw Leon Best score a hat-trick on his debut in a 5–0 defeat of West Ham United, a memorable 4–4 comeback against Arsenal, and a 4–1 defeat of Wolverhampton Wanderers, eventually finishing 12th in the league.

Entering 2011–12, Pardew was reportedly denied the £35 million from the sale of Andy Carroll for transfers and told to sell players to raise funds, having claimed he had been assured the finances upon Carroll's departure. Kevin Keegan had previously stated Alan Pardew should not have expected the money following his issues with the board in 2008. The club signed many French-speaking players in the transfer window, including Yohan Cabaye, Mathieu Debuchy, Sylvain Marveaux and Demba Ba. and with impressive results throughout the season, Newcastle finished fifth.

In the 2012–13 UEFA Europa League, Newcastle reached the quarter-finals, and in the January transfer window, the French revolution continued into the new year, with Moussa Sissoko and Yoan Gouffran joining the squad. The team, however, had a poor 2012–13 Premier League and finished 16th in the Premier League.

Beginning the 2013–14 season, in a surprise move Joe Kinnear returned to the club as Director of Football, instantly causing fan fury following his outburst that he was "more intelligent" than the fans and critics, as well as mispronouncing various players names during a radio interview. However, he resigned after just eight months on the job following further critique for managing to sign only two players on loan—Loïc Rémy and Luuk de Jong—throughout the season's summer and January transfer windows, as well selling Yohan Cabaye to Paris Saint-Germain for £20 million, considered to be one of the most influential players at the time. Following the lack of transfer activity, Mike Ashley once again faced a fan revolt, with protests being launched at him to sell the club, and entered a dispute with several media titles whom the club banned from Newcastle United media facilities, press conferences and player interviews, declaring stories reported were intensely exaggerated and aimed only to damage Ashley's image further. Throughout the season, the club remained on course to ensure a top half finish, notably defeating Manchester United at Old Trafford for the first time since 1972. Nonetheless, the team struggled for goals following the sale of Cabaye. Further dismay upon the season was caused when Pardew was banned for seven matches and fined £100,000 for an assault on Hull City midfielder David Meyler. The club then encountered a poor run of form, losing eight out of ten games and finishing the season tenth in the league, though the club confirmed Alan Pardew would stay on.

The opening eight games of the 2014–15 season proved disappointing, with the club failing to secure a win. After the dip in form, however, the club had an emphatic resurgence, seeing a five-game unbeaten run whilst also surprising League Cup holders Manchester City with a 2–0 win and progressing to the quarter-finals of the tournament. Pardew, however, resigned from the club on 30 December 2014 following immense pressure from fans calling for his departure, with many posters at games designed with the Sports Direct logo advertising a website demanding his resignation. Pardew admitted in the months leading up to his departure that protests from the fans were affecting his family and was subsequently feeling unhappy at the club. He was replaced by his assistant manager John Carver, though the team subsequently earned just 13 points out of a possible 50, surviving relegation on the final day of the season with a victory over West Ham, Carver was dismissed before the club's pre-season for 2016 began. The club paid tribute to player Jonás Gutiérrez following his successful recovery from testicular cancer to resume his playing career.

Beginning the 2015–16 season, former England F.C. Manager Steve McClaren was appointed manager, signing Georginio Wijnaldum, Aleksandar Mitrovic, Chancel Mbemba, Florian Thauvin, Henri Saivet, Jonjo Shelvey, Andros Townsend and Ivan Toney. McClaren however struggled to produce results winning 6 and drawing 6 out of 28 games, whilst exiting both the FA Cup and League Cup in the Third Round. McClaren was subsequently sacked on 11 March 2016 with critics and former players voicing their favour of the decision. Rafael Benítez was announced as McClaren's successor the same day, signing a three-year deal. Benítez recorded his first victory in 3–0 defeat of Swansea City in the Premier League on 17 April 2016 after 5 games in charge, and maintained an emphatic 5-game unbeaten streak to the end of the season. Newcastle were however relegated from the Premier League along with Aston Villa and Norwich finishing 18th place, 2 points below safety. Betting websites confirmed after the final game that the club's 5–1 defeat of Tottenham Hotspur matched the initial odds of Leicester City's 5000/1 win of the 2015–16 Premier League season.

== Championship win, return to Premier League (2016–2021) ==
Starting the 2016-17 season, Rafa Benítez signed 12 new players full-time and also acquired 5 players on loan, whilst 8 players left the club and another 12 on loan. New signings Dwight Gayle and Matt Ritchie proved popular scoring a combined total of 39 goals, finishing among the top goalscorers that season. Despite failing to improve on their dominant success in the 2009/10 championship season, the club remained in contention for the trophy throughout; threatened only by Brighton & Hove Albion Newcastle enjoyed a 3-game winning streak to the final day of the season and lifted the Football League Championship trophy on 8 May 2017 following a 3–0 win over Barnsley. Rafa Benítez denied speculation that he would leave the club following promotion to the Premier League and confirmed his commitment to the club for the foreseeable future. Shortly prior to the season's finish, the club was subject to raids by HMRC following suspicions of tax evasion. Managing Director Lee Charnley was arrested during the raid, but was later released without charge.

Ending the 2017-18 season, the club finished 10th in the Premier League defeating the current champions Chelsea on the final day of the season, the highest finish achieved within 4 years. Beginning the 2018–19 season, Mike Ashley again came under scrutiny following lack of major signings in the summer transfer window, with many fans accusing him of lacking interest in the club following his purchase of troubled retail chain House of Fraser for £90m. Despite the January signing of Miguel Almirón from Atlanta United FC for £21 million surpassing the club's transfer record fee of £16.8 million for Michael Owen in 2005, the club struggled throughout the season with 12 wins, 9 draws and 17 losses seeing a 13th place league table finish, whilst exiting the League Cup at the 2nd round in a 3–1 defeat of Nottingham Forest F.C and a 4th round exit of the FA Cup in a 2–0 defeat to Watford F.C. The season also saw heavy speculation regarding Rafa Benítez remaining at the club following reports he was still in negotiations following the end of the season.

Following fresh reports of Ashley's intention to sell the club, Sheikh Khaled Bin Zayed Al Nahyan, Founder and Chairman of The Bin Zayed Group of Companies, a member of the Al Nahyan royal family of Abu Dhabi, confirmed he had agreed terms to purchase the club for £350 million. On 5 June 2019 a company named Monochrome Acquisitions Limited was registered in Nahyan's name, whilst managing director Lee Charnley applied to have four companies linked to Ashley's company St James Holdings Ltd struck off, leaving many to believe the club was on course to be sold. Talks of a takeover however stalled throughout the summer transfer window, whilst Ashley confirmed he had not received an official bid from any prospective buyer.

Benítez rejected a new contract offer and departed the club on 30 June 2019, accepting a move to Chinese Super League side Dalian Yifang in a £12 million deal. Ashley criticised Benítez stating unfair demands were made making it impossible for him to remain as manager. Notable player departures saw Salomón Rondón join Benitez at Dalian Yifang after returning to West Bromwich Albion F.C. from loan, whilst Ayoze Perez joined Leicester City for £30 million and Mohamed Diamé was released by Newcastle upon the expiry of his contract at the end of the 2018–19 season.

BBC Sport reported in July 2019 that Steve Bruce had resigned from his managerial position at Sheffield Wednesday after he earlier admitted that he had held talks with Newcastle United over their managerial vacancy. His appointment was confirmed on 17 July. Sheffield Wednesday however stated there were still outstanding legal issues with Bruce having resigned just 48 hours before, leading a report being filed to the Premier League alleging misconduct in his appointment. Newcastle United denied any wrongdoing and stated they were confident no case could be escalated. Reaction from the fans was mixed, with some feeling Bruce would not achieve the standard set by Benítez, whilst his recent lack of Premier League football and management of rival club Sunderland proved controversial. Bruce later acknowledged Benítez's popularity and stated he hoped the fans would not rush to judgement and give him time to prove himself and manager of Newcastle. Due to visa problems in China, Bruce watched his first match as manager from the stands which saw Newcastle achieve a third-place finish in the pre-season 2019 Premier League Asia Trophy following a 1–0 victory over West Ham United F.C. Bruce quickly made his first transfer, signing Joelinton from TSG 1899 Hoffenheim for £40 million, breaking the club's transfer fee record previously held by Miguel Almirón at £21 million just 6 months before, before signing French international winger Allan Saint-Maximin from OGC Nice on a permanent deal for £16.5 million, Sweden international defender Emil Krafth for £5 million, central midfielder Kyle Scott on a free signing following his departure from Chelsea, and Netherlands international defender Jetro Willems on loan from Frankfurt F.C until the end of the 2019–20 season. Bruce made his final transfer of the pre-season on deadline day by re-signing striker Andy Carroll, who had left the club over 7 years earlier. On 4 February 2020, Steve Bruce's side ended a 14-year drought by reaching the 5th round of the FA Cup they beat League One side Oxford United 2–3 in a replay thanks to a late winner from Allan Saint-Maximin in extra time.

From March 2020, the season was affected by the COVID-19 pandemic. On 13 March, following an emergency meeting between the Premier League, The Football Association (FA), the English Football League and the FA Women's Super League, it was unanimously decided to suspend professional football in England. On 19 March, the suspension was extended indefinitely, with a restart date of 17 June announced in late May with all remaining games to be played without crowd attendance.

Newcastle finished the season in 13th place. Defender Danny Rose was an outspoken critic of the decision to continue the season, citing the virus was still in major circulation and accused the FA of having no concern for footballers' health. Karl Darlow has since urged players at the club to get vaccinated following his hospitalisation from complications of Covid, whilst manager Steve Bruce admitted some players had voluntarily declined the vaccination.

The 2020-21 season saw all matches played without crowd attendance until May 2021, in light of the COVID-19 pandemic. Newcastle failed to improve on the previous season, finishing 12th in the premier league and were knocked out of the FA Cup in the third round added time to Arsenal and exited the EFL Cup in the quarter-finals losing 1–0 to Brentford.

== New ownership (2021–present) ==
In April 2020, it was widely reported that a consortium consisting of Public Investment Fund, PCP Capital Partners and the Reuben Brothers, was finalising an offer to acquire Newcastle United. The proposed sale prompted concerns and criticism, such as arguments considering it sportwashing of the country's human rights record, as well as ongoing large-scale piracy of sports broadcasts in the region. However the consortium announced its withdrawal from the Newcastle deal on July 30, 2020, after multiple media reports highlighted realm as the staunch violator of human rights, and the WTO ruled that it was behind the piracy campaign using pirate-pay-service beoutQ. "With a deep appreciation for the Newcastle community and the significance of its football club, we have come to the decision to withdraw our interest in acquiring Newcastle United Football Club," the group said in its statement upon withdrawal. The group also stated that the "prolonged process" was a major factor in them pulling out. The collapse of the takeover was met with widespread criticism from Newcastle fans, with Newcastle MP Chi Onwurah accusing the Premier League of treating fans of the club with "contempt" and subsequently wrote to Masters for an explanation. Despite the consortium's withdrawal, disputes over the takeover continued. On 9 September 2020, Newcastle United released a statement claiming that the Premier League had officially rejected the takeover by the consortium and accused Masters and the Premier League board of "[not] acting appropriately in relation to [the takeover]", while stating that the club would be considering any relevant legal action. The Premier League strongly denied this in a statement released the next day, expressing "surprise" and "disappointment" at Newcastle's statement.

On October 7, 2021, the Public Investment Fund, PCP Capital Partners and RB Sports & Media confirmed that they had officially completed the acquisition of Newcastle United. Governor of the investment fund Yasir bin Othman Al-Rumayyan was appointed non-executive chairman, whilst Amanda Staveley and Jamie Reuben were both appointed as directors and each held a 10% shareholding in the club.

The takeover led to widespread speculation that manager Steve Bruce was expected to leave the club. Although not denying the speculation that the club was keen to appoint a new manager, Staveley stated Bruce was to remain for the new owners first game against Tottenham Hotspur; his 1000th match as a football manager. However following Newcastle losing the game 3-2 and alleged discontent among the players, Bruce left the club by mutual consent. Bruce stated his sadness at leaving the club and felt Newcastle fans launched unnecessary verbal abuse at him during his time there. Interim manager Graeme Jones as well as Arsenal manager Mikel Arteta supported Bruce's claims stating the abuse he received was off putting for other managers to take the role.

Eddie Howe was appointed as manager on 8 November 2021. The announcement was made following reports that the club had discussed the role with him the previous week and confirmed following his attendance at the away draw to Brighton & Hove Albion. On 19 November 2021, Newcastle announced that Howe had tested positive for COVID-19 and would miss his first game in charge, which instead forced him to watch his first game as manager from a hotel room as Newcastle drew 3–3 with Brentford on 20 November.

Lee Charnley, who acted as Managing Director under Ashley's ownership, left the club on 19 November 2021 following a six-week handover period. His departure was the final of Mike Ashley's hierarchy, with Staveley stating the club was undergoing a "formal process" to appoint a new figure to replace the role.

Eddie Howe had to wait until 4 December 2021 for his first win as Newcastle manager in a 1–0 win against Burnley, which was also the first win since the takeover happened. Howe then made five signings in the first January transfer window under the new ownership which included a marquee singing in Brazilian midfielder Bruno Guimarães from Olympique Lyonnais. The transfer window and the players that were already there that Howe improved helped Newcastle to go on a 9-game unbeaten run in the Premier League to get them 10 points clear from the relegation zone and increasing the chance of guaranteeing survival. After Newcastle's 1–0 win against Crystal Palace, this was the first time the club had managed to win 6 home games in a row since 2004 when Sir Bobby Robson was in charge. Newcastle finished in 11th place after a run of 12 wins in their final 18 games, and became the first team in Premier League history to avoid relegation after not winning any of the first 14 games they played.

On 30 May 2022, the club announced they had reached an agreement of a compensation fee with Brighton & Hove Albion to appoint Dan Ashworth as the new Sporting Director, the appointment was confirmed on 6 June 2022. On 15 July 2022, the club brought in Darren Eales, from MLS side Atlanta United, as the club's new Chief Executive Officer - acting as a "key member of the club's leadership structure".

On 5 September 2025, Newcastle United announced the appointment of David Hopkinson as Chief Executive Officer. Hopkinson, who previously held senior roles at Real Madrid, Madison Square Garden Sports, and Maple Leaf Sports & Entertainment, succeeded Darren Eales. His mandate includes strengthening the club’s commercial strategy, expanding its global profile, and overseeing long-term infrastructure projects.

== Chairman history ==
As of 2021

Name	Nat	From	To
George Rutherford	(England)	1936	1949
John Lee	(England)	1949	1953
Wilf Taylor	(England)	1953	1957
William McKeag	(England)	1957	1960
Wally Hurford	(England)	1960	1963
Lord Westwood	(England)	1963	1978
Bob Rutherford	(England)	1978	1981
Stan Seymour Jr.	(England)	1981	1988
Gordon McKeag	(England)	1988	1990
George Forbes	(Scotland)	1990	1992
Sir John Hall	(England)	1992	1997
Sir Terry Harrison	(England)	1997	1998
Freddy Shepherd	(England)	1998	2007
Chris Mort	(England)	2007	2008
Derek Llambias (Managing Director)	(England)	2008	2013
Mike Ashley	(England)	2013	2014
Lee Charnley (Managing Director)	(England)	2014	2021
Yasir Al-Rumayyan	(Saudi Arabia)	2021	Present

== Owners history ==
Newcastle United was set up as a private company limited by shares on 6 September 1895. However, by the 1930s, ownership of the company was dominated by a small number of individuals: Alderman William McKeag, George and Robert Rutherford, and William Westwood, 1st Baron Westwood. George Stanley Seymour was allocated some shares when he joined the board in 1938.

By the second half of the 20th century, these shareholdings had passed to the next generation: Gordon McKeag, Robert James Rutherford, Stan Seymour Jr. and William Westwood, 2nd Baron Westwood.

John Hall, who bought 79.2% of the club for £3 million in 1991, floated the club on the stock exchange as a public limited company in April 1997. After the float 57% of the shares were held by John Hall and his family, and a minority were held by his business partner Freddy Shepherd.

In 2007, St James Holdings Limited, the bid vehicle of billionaire businessman Mike Ashley, secured control of the club, and in 2021, the Public Investment Fund of Saudi Arabia, PCP Capital Partners and RB Sports & Media confirmed that they had acquired ownership of the club.

Name	Nat	From	To
Many small shareholders	England	1895	1938
McKeag, Rutherford, Seymour and Westwood families	England	1938	1992
Sir John Hall	England	1992	2007
Mike Ashley	England	2007	2021
Public Investment Fund	Saudi Arabia	2021	present
PCP Capital Partners	England	2021	2024
RB Sports & Media	England	2021	present

== See also ==
- Newcastle United F.C. in European football
