= 1988–89 Newcastle United F.C. season =

Newcastle United
1988–89 season
- Chairman: Gordon McKeag
- Manager: Willie McFaul (until 9 October); Colin Suggett (caretaker until 14 December); Jim Smith (from 14 December)
- Stadium: St James' Park
- First Division: 20th
- FA Cup: Third round
- League Cup: Second round
- Full Members Cup: Third round
- Mercantile Credit Centenary Trophy: Semi-final
- Top goalscorer: League: Mirandinha (9); All: Mirandinha (11)
- Highest home attendance: 33,508 (vs. Tottenham Hotspur)
- Lowest home attendance: 14,445 (vs. West Ham United)
- Average home league attendance: 22,815
Home colours	Away colours

During the 1988–89 season, Newcastle United participated in the Football League First Division. During the summer the club invested heavily in their squad, attempting to offset the loss of rising star Paul Gascoigne to Tottenham Hotspur for a then club record fee. The FA Cup winners Dave Beasant and Andy Thorn were signed from Wimbledon for £850,000 each, and the Scotsmen John Robertson and John Hendrie also joined as the club spent the £2.2 million it received for Gascoigne. The loss of Gascoigne proved to be the straw that broke the camel's back so soon after selling Peter Beardsley and Chris Waddle, and promising youngster Michael O'Neill, struggling with loss of form and injuries along with the enigmatic Brazilian Mirandinha, were in and out of the team all season.

Newcastle United were relegated, finishing bottom after changing their manager two months into the season. Willie McFaul was sacked as manager after a 3–0 home defeat to Coventry City, a week after the team had beaten the League champions Liverpool at Anfield. New chairman Gordon McKeag swiftly moved to bring former manager Arthur Cox back to the club, but Cox quickly rejected any suggestion of leaving his current employers, Derby County. The club then reached an agreement to appoint former Celtic manager David Hay as their new manager, only for the deal to fall apart over a dispute over the length of his contract. Colin Suggett took over as caretaker, with a view to possibly taking the role full-time if he could steer the club clear of danger, but he lost 5 of his first 6 matches, and only recorded one league victory overall during his two months in charge, leaving the club looking already hopelessly adrift at the bottom of the table by the time they finally recruited a permanent successor to McFaul in mid-December.

The new manager Jim Smith, who struggled to change the team's fortunes, set about 'wheeling and dealing' that saw many changes to the squad. Beasant and Robertson were replaced by the inexperienced Northern Irish goalkeeper Tommy Wright and the expatriate striker Rob McDonald. Other signings included the ex-England international Kenny Sansom, the experienced right back Ray Ranson and the Danish pair Bjørn Kristensen and Frank Pingel, but these changes had little effect and failed to stop the club's slide towards the Second Division, as they collected only two points from their last nine matches.

== League table ==
Pos	Team	Pld	W	D	L	GF	GA	GD	Pts	Qualification or relegation
16	Luton Town	38	10	11	17	42	52	−10	41	
17	Aston Villa	38	9	13	16	45	56	−11	40	
18	Middlesbrough (R)	38	9	12	17	44	61	−17	39	Relegation to the Second Division
19	West Ham United (R)	38	10	8	20	37	62	−25	38	Relegation to the Second Division
20	Newcastle United (R)	38	7	10	21	32	63	−31	31	Relegation to the Second Division

Source: World Football
Rules for classification: 1) Points; 2) Goal difference; 3) Goals scored
(R) Relegated

== Results ==
Everton	4–0	Newcastle United	Everton
			Stadium: Goodison Park; Attendance: 41,560

Newcastle United	2–2	Tottenham Hotspur	Newcastle-upon-Tyne
			Stadium: St. James' Park; Attendance: 33,508

Derby County	2–0	Newcastle United	Derby
			Stadium: Baseball Ground; Attendance: 16,014

Newcastle United	0–2	Norwich City	Newcastle-upon-Tyne
			Stadium: St. James' Park; Attendance: 22,809

Charlton Athletic	2–2	Newcastle United	Charlton
			Stadium: The Valley; Attendance: 6,088

Liverpool	1–2	Newcastle United	Liverpool
Gillespie		Hendrie, Mirandinha	Stadium: Anfield; Attendance: 39,139

Newcastle United	0–3	Coventry City	Newcastle-upon-Tyne
			Stadium: St. James' Park; Attendance: 22,890

West Ham United	2–0	Newcastle United	London
			Stadium: Boleyn Ground; Attendance: 17,765

Newcastle United	3–0	Middlesbrough	Newcastle-upon-Tyne
			Stadium: St. James' Park; Attendance: 23,845

Newcastle United	0–1	Nottingham Forest	Newcastle-upon-Tyne
			Stadium: St. James' Park; Attendance: 24,642

Queens Park Rangers	3–0	Newcastle United	Shepherd's Bush
			Stadium: Loftus Road; Attendance: 11,013

Newcastle United	0–1	Arsenal	Newcastle-upon-Tyne
			Stadium: St. James' Park; Attendance: 23,807

Millwall	4–0	Newcastle United	Bermondsey
			Stadium: The Den; Attendance: 15,767

Newcastle United	0–0	Manchester United	Newcastle-upon-Tyne
			Stadium: St. James' Park; Attendance: 20,234

Luton Town	0–0	Newcastle United	Luton
			Stadium: Kenilworth Road; Attendance: 8,338

Newcastle United	2–1	Wimbledon	Newcastle-upon-Tyne
			Stadium: St. James' Park; Attendance: 20,292

Newcastle United	3–3	Southampton	Newcastle-upon-Tyne
			Stadium: St. James' Park; Attendance: 20,103

Sheffield Wednesday	1–2	Newcastle United	Owlerton
			Stadium: Hillsborough; Attendance: 25,573

Tottenham Hotspur	2–0	Newcastle United	London
			Stadium: White Hart Lane; Attendance: 27,739

Newcastle United	0–1	Derby County	Newcastle-upon-Tyne
			Stadium: St. James' Park; Attendance: 31,079

Aston Villa	3–1	Newcastle United	Aston
			Stadium: Villa Park; Attendance: 21,010

Newcastle United	0–2	Charlton Athletic	Newcastle-upon-Tyne
			Stadium: St. James' Park; Attendance: 19,076

Newcastle United	2–2	Liverpool	Newcastle-upon-Tyne
			Stadium: St. James' Park; Attendance: 30,983

Coventry City	1–2	Newcastle United	Coventry
			Stadium: Highfield Road; Attendance: 16,577

Middlesbrough	1–1	Newcastle United	Middlesbrough
			Stadium: Ayresome Park; Attendance: 24,385

Newcastle United	1–2	Queens Park Rangers	Newcastle-upon-Tyne
			Stadium: St. James' Park; Attendance: 21,665

Nottingham Forest	1–1	Newcastle United	Nottingham
			Stadium: City Ground; Attendance: 20,800

Newcastle United	2–0	Everton	Newcastle-upon-Tyne
			Stadium: St. James' Park; Attendance: 21,012

Norwich City	0–2	Newcastle United	Norwich
			Stadium: Carrow Road; Attendance: 22,440

Newcastle United	1–3	Sheffield Wednesday	Newcastle-upon-Tyne
			Stadium: St. James' Park; Attendance: 31,010

Southampton	1–0	Newcastle United	Southampton
			Stadium: The Dell; Attendance: 16,175

Newcastle United	1–2	Aston Villa	Newcastle-upon-Tyne
			Stadium: St. James' Park; Attendance: 20,464

Arsenal	1–0	Newcastle United	London
			Stadium: Highbury; Attendance: 38,023

Newcastle United	0–0	Luton Town	Newcastle-upon-Tyne
			Stadium: St. James' Park; Attendance: 18,636

Wimbledon	4–0	Newcastle United	London
			Stadium: Plough Lane; Attendance: 5,206

Newcastle United	1–2	West Ham United	Newcastle-upon-Tyne
			Stadium: St. James' Park; Attendance: 14,445

Newcastle United	1–1	Millwall	Newcastle-upon-Tyne
			Stadium: St. James' Park; Attendance: 14,731

Manchester United	2–0	Newcastle United	Manchester
			Stadium: Old Trafford; Attendance: 30,379

== Squad ==
(Substitute appearances in brackets)

Pos.	Name	League		FA Cup		League Cup		Simod Cup		MCC Trophy		Total	
Pos.	Name	Apps	Goals	Apps	Goals	Apps	Goals	Apps	Goals	Apps	Goals	Apps	Goals
GK	(England) Dave Beasant	20	0	1	0	2	0	1	0	2	0	26	0
GK	(Republic of Ireland) Gary Kelly	9	0	0	0	0	0	0	0	0	0	9	0
GK	(Northern Ireland) Tommy Wright	9	0	3	0	0	0	0	0	0	0	12	0
DF	(Republic of Ireland) John Anderson	21	1	0	0	2	0	1	0	0	0	24	1
DF	(England) Steve Howey	0 (1)	0	0	0	0	0	0	0	0	0	0 (1)	0
DF	(England) Peter Jackson	1	0	0	0	0	0	0	0	1	0	2	0
DF	(Denmark) Bjørn Kristensen	4 (1)	0	0	0	0	0	0	0	0	0	4 (1)	0
DF	(England) Ray Ranson	13 (1)	1	4	0	0	0	0	0	0	0	17 (1)	1
DF	(England) Glenn Roeder	18	0	3	0	0	0	1	0	0	0	22	0
DF	(England) Kenny Sansom	20	0	4	0	0	0	0	0	0	0	24	0
DF	(England) Kevin Scott	29	0	4	0	2	0	0 (1)	0	1	0	36 (1)	0
DF	(England) Andy Thorn	26	1	0	0	2	0	1	0	2	0	31	1
DF	(England) Kenny Wharton	14 (4)	0	4	0	2	0	1	0	2	0	23 (4)	0
MF	(England) Ian Bogie	3 (3)	0	1 (2)	0	0 (1)	0	0	0	1	0	5 (6)	0
MF	(England) Kevin Brock	21	2	4	1	0	0	1	0	0	0	26	3
MF	(England) John Cornwell	8 (1)	0	0	0	1	0	0 (1)	0	2	0	11 (2)	0
MF	(Scotland) Albert Craig	0 (1)	0	0	0	0	0	0	0	0	0	0 (1)	0
MF	(Scotland) Archie Gourlay	0 (1)	0	0	0	0	0	0	0	0	0	0 (1)	0
MF	(Northern Ireland) David McCreery	36	0	4	0	0	0	0	0	2	0	42	0
MF	(Republic of Ireland) Liam O'Brien	17 (3)	3	4	0	0	0	1	0	0	0	22 (3)	3
MF	(Northern Ireland) Michael O'Neill	17 (10)	4	1 (1)	0	2	0	0	0	1	1	21 (11)	5
MF	(England) Lee Payne	6 (1)	0	0	0	0	0	0	0	0	0	6 (1)	0
MF	(England) David Roche	0 (2)	0	0	0	0	0	0	0	0	0	0 (2)	0
MF	(England) Paul Stephenson	7 (1)	0	0	0	1	0	0	0	1	0	9 (1)	0
MF	(Scotland) Paul Sweeney	6 (2)	0	0	0	0	0	0	0	0	0	6 (2)	0
MF	(England) Brian Tinnion	12 (1)	1	0	0	2	0	0	0	1 (1)	0	15 (2)	1
FW	(England) Gary Brazil	3 (4)	0	0	0	0	0	0	0	0	0	3 (4)	0
FW	(Scotland) John Hendrie	34	4	4	0	2	1	1	0	2	0	43	5
FW	(Scotland) Darren Jackson	13 (2)	2	0	0	2	0	1	0	2	0	18 (2)	2
FW	(England) Anth Lormor	3	1	0	0	0	0	0	0	0	0	3	1
FW	(England) Rob McDonald	6 (4)	1	1 (3)	0	0	0	1	1	0	0	8 (7)	2
FW	(Brazil) Mirandinha	22 (6)	9	2 (1)	1	2	1	1	0	0 (1)	0	27 (8)	11
FW	(Denmark) Frank Pingel	13 (1)	1	0	0	0	0	0	0	0	0	13 (1)	1
FW	(Scotland) John Robertson	7 (5)	0	0	0	0 (2)	0	0	0	2	0	9 (7)	0
FW	(England) David Robinson	0 (1)	0	0	0	0	0	0	0	0	0	0 (1)	0

=== Coaching staff ===
Position	Staff
Manager	(England) Jim Smith
Assistant Manager	(England) Bobby Saxton

Last updated: 3 May 2011

== Sources ==
- Powter, David (1995). Newcastle United: The 25 Year Record 1970-71 to 1994-95. Soccer Book Publishing Ltd. ISBN 0-947808-54-X.
- Joannou, Paul (2011). Newcastle United: The Ultimate Record 1881-2011. N Publishing. ISBN 978-0-9568156-0-6.
