= 1991–92 Newcastle United F.C. season =

Newcastle United
1991–92 season
- Chairman: Sir John Hall
- Manager: Osvaldo Ardiles (until 5 February 1992); Kevin Keegan (from 5 February 1992)
- Stadium: St James' Park
- Division Two: 20th
- FA Cup: Third round
- League Cup: Third round
- Full Members Cup: First round
- Top goalscorer: League: Peacock (16); All: Peacock (19)
- Highest home attendance: 30,306 (vs. Sunderland)
- Lowest home attendance: 9,175 (vs. Crewe Alexandra)
Home colours	Away colours

During the 1991–92 season, English football team Newcastle United participated in the Football League Second Division.

The season started with much promise but quickly deteriorated into a relegation battle. Manager Ossie Ardiles struggled to add to his squad of talented youngsters due to lack of funds, the truth being the club was severely in debt. At one point it had looked like Newcastle would be relegated and could go out of business.

Sir John Hall had all but taken control of the club, and replaced Ardiles with Kevin Keegan on 5 February 1992. An improvement in form helped Newcastle to narrowly avoid relegation from the Second Division, with their survival only confirmed on the last day of the season. They finished 20th, two places above the relegation zone – the lowest League finish in the club's history.

== Season synopsis ==
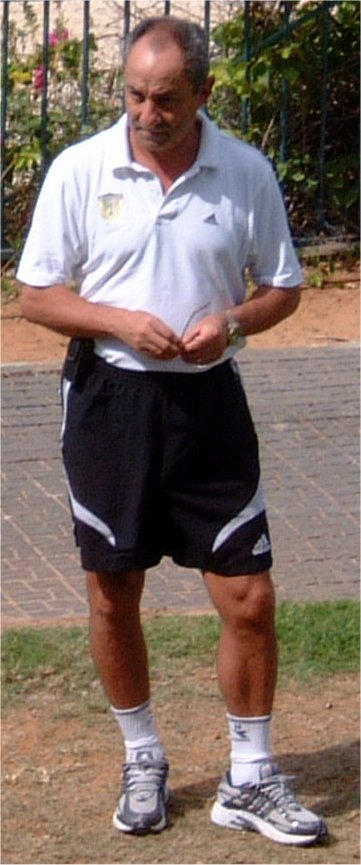
Ossie Ardiles

In a season that saw a change of manager, the club had three different chairmen: Gordon McKeag stepped down under pressure from the Magpie Group consortium, to be replaced by board member George Forbes, before Sir John Hall, the head of the Magpie Group since the late 1980s, replaced Forbes

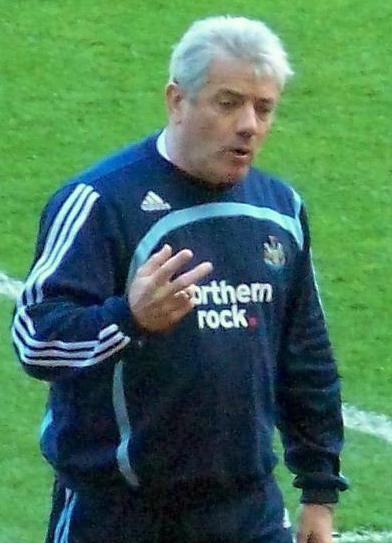
Kevin Keegan

Hall presided over a period of boardroom calm at the club, debts were restructured and the funds were made available for team strengthening. He chairman installed Kevin Keegan, a former Newcastle player, as the new manager on 5 February 1992, in place of Ardiles. In the last few weeks of the season Keegan led the team to safety and the possibility of relegation to the third division for the first time in the club's history.

Just as in the 1980s, Keegan's mere presence captivated the region. St James' Park was regularly packed to capacity again and United confirmed their Second Division survival with a 2–1 win at Leicester City on the last day of the season, after a last-minute own goal.

Even though the club had narrowly avoided relegation, the club's supporters were overjoyed with the choice of manager and the prospect of a bright new start.

== League table ==
Pos	Team	Pld	W	D	L	GF	GA	GD	Pts	Qualification or relegation
18	Sunderland	46	14	11	21	61	65	−4	53	Qualification for the First Division (Note: From the 1992–93 season, the first tier became the Premier League, the second tier - then known as the Second Division - was renamed to the First Division, and the third tier - then known as the Third Division - was renamed to the Second Division.)
19	Grimsby Town	46	14	11	21	47	62	−15	53	Qualification for the First Division
20	Newcastle United	46	13	13	20	66	84	−18	52	Qualification for the First Division
21	Oxford United	46	13	11	22	66	73	−7	50	Qualification for the First Division
22	Plymouth Argyle (R)	46	13	9	24	42	64	−22	48	Relegation to the Second Division

Rules for classification: 1) Points; 2) Goal difference; 3) Goals scored
(R) Relegated

== Appearances, goals and cards ==
(Substitute appearances in brackets)

Pos.	Name	League		FA Cup		League Cup		ZDS Cup		Total	
Pos.	Name	Apps	Goals	Apps	Goals	Apps	Goals	Apps	Goals	Apps	Goals
GK	(Northern Ireland) Tommy Wright	33	0	2	0	1	0	0	0	36	0
DF	(England) Matty Appleby	16 (2)	0	2	0	2 (1)	0	0	0	20 (3)	0
DF	(Wales) Paul Bodin	6	0	0	0	0	0	0	0	6	0
DF	(England) Darren Bradshaw	17 (2)	0	1	0	2	0	1	0	21 (2)	0
DF	(England) Robbie Elliott	9	0	0	0	1	0	1	0	11	0
DF	(England) Steve Howey	13 (8)	1	0 (2)	0	1 (2)	1	0	0	14 (12)	2
DF	(England) Brian Kilcline	12	0	0	0	0	0	0	0	12	0
DF	(Denmark) Bjørn Kristensen	1 (1)	0	0	0	0	0	0	0	1 (1)	0
DF	(England) Darron McDonough	2 (1)	0	0	0	0	0	0	0	2 (1)	0
DF	(Wales) Gavin Maguire	3	0	0	0	0	0	0	0	3	0
DF	(Wales) Alan Neilson	16	0	0	0	2	0	1	0	19	0
DF	(England) Ray Ranson	5 (1)	0	0	0	0	0	0	0	5 (1)	0
DF	(England) Kevin Scott	44	1	2	0	3	0	1	0	50	1
DF	(England) Mark Stimson	23 (1)	0	0	0	2	0	0	0	25 (1)	0
DF	(England) Steve Watson	23 (5)	1	2	0	0	0	0	0	25 (5)	1
DF	(Scotland) Terry Wilson	2	0	0	0	0	0	0	0	2	0
MF	(England) Kevin Brock	31 (4)	4	2	0	0	0	1	0	34 (4)	4
MF	(England) Franz Carr	12 (3)	2	0	0	1	0	0	0	13 (3)	2
MF	(England) Lee Clark	25 (4)	5	2	0	3	0	1	1	31 (4)	6
MF	(Scotland) Archie Gourlay	0 (1)	0	0	0	0	0	0	0	0 (1)	0
MF	(England) Lee Makel	5 (4)	1	0	0	1	0	0	0	6 (4)	1
MF	(Republic of Ireland) Liam O'Brien	40	4	2	0	3	0	4	0	46	4
MF	(England) Gavin Peacock	46	16	2	0	2	3	1	2	51	21
MF	(England) David Roche	18 (8)	0	1	0	2	0	0 (1)	0	21 (9)	0
MF	(Republic of Ireland) Kevin Sheedy	13	1	0	0	0	0	0	0	13	1
MF	(England) Alan Thompson	12 (2)	0	1	0	0	0	0	0	13 (2)	0
FW	(England) Justin Fashanu	0	0	0	0	0 (1)	0	0	0	0 (1)	0
FW	(England) Andy Hunt	21 (6)	9	2	2	3	1	1	0	27 (6)	12
FW	(Republic of Ireland) David Kelly	25	11	1	0	0	0	0	0	26	11
FW	(England) Micky Quinn	18 (4)	7	0	0	1	0	1	3	20 (4)	10
FW	(England) David Robinson	0 (3)	0	0	0	0	0	0	0	0 (3)	0
FW	(Scotland) Andy Walker	2	0	0	0	1	0	0	0	3	0

== Coaching staff ==
Position	Staff
Manager	(England) Kevin Keegan
Assistant Manager	(England) Terry McDermott
First Team coach	(England) Derek Fazackerley
Goalkeeping Coach	(England) Jim Montgomery
Development Coach	(England)
Reserve Team Coach	(England)
Chief scout	(Scotland)

Last updated: 3 May 2011

== Matches ==
=== Second Division ===
18 August 1991 1	Charlton Athletic	2–1	Newcastle United	London
15:00 BST	Lee; Leaburn		Carr	Stadium: Upton Park; Attendance: 9,322

24 August 1991 2	Newcastle United	2–2	Watford	Newcastle upon Tyne
15:00 BST	Clark; Hunt		Nicholas; Blissett	Stadium: St James' Park; Attendance: 22,440

27 August 1991 3	Middlesbrough	3–0	Newcastle United	Middlesbrough
19:45 BST	Falconer; Proctor; Wilkinson	[]		Stadium: Ayresome Park; Attendance: 16,970

31 August 1991 4	Bristol Rovers	1–2	Newcastle United	Bristol
15:00 BST	Skinner		Quinn; O'Brien	Stadium: Memorial Stadium; Attendance: 6,334

4 September 1991 5	Newcastle United	2–2	Plymouth Argyle	Newcastle upon Tyne
15:00 BST	Carr; Quinn		Salman; Marshall	Stadium: St James' Park; Attendance: 19,543

7 September 1991 6	Tranmere Rovers	3–2	Newcastle United	Birkenhead
15:00 BST	Vickers; Malkin; Thomas		Clark; O'Brien	Stadium: Prenton Park; Attendance: 11,465

14 September 1991 7	Newcastle United	1–2	Wolverhampton Wanderers	Newcastle upon Tyne
15:00 BST	[OG]		[OG] Bull	Stadium: St James' Park; Attendance: 20,195

17 September 1991 8	Newcastle United	1–1	Ipswich Town	Newcastle upon Tyne
15:00 BST	Quinn(p)		Kiwomya	Stadium: St James' Park; Attendance: 16,336

21 September 1991 9	Millwall	2–1	Newcastle United	London
15:00 BST	Kerr (2)		Neilson	Stadium: The Den; Attendance: 9,156

28 September 1991 10	Newcastle United	2–2	Derby County	Newcastle upon Tyne
15:00 BST	Quinn; Hunt		Davison; Ormondroyd	Stadium: St James' Park; Attendance: 17,581

5 October 1991 11	Portsmouth	3–1	Newcastle United	Portsmouth
15:00 BST	Quinn		Beresford(p) [og] Clarke	Stadium: Fratton Park; Attendance: 10,185

12 October 1991 12	Newcastle United	2–0	Leicester City	Newcastle upon Tyne
15:00 BST	Hunt; Clark			Stadium: St James' Park; Attendance: 17,129

19 October 1991 13	Newcastle United	4–3	Oxford United	Newcastle upon Tyne
15:00 BST	Hunt; Peacock (3)		Durnin; Ford; Lewis	Stadium: St James' Park; Attendance: 16,454

26 October 1991 14	Bristol City	1–1	Newcastle United	Bristol
15:00 BST	Taylor		Clark	Stadium: Ashton Gate Stadium; Attendance: 8,613

2 November 1991 15	Swindon Town	2–1	Newcastle United	Swindon
15:00 GMT	Calderwood; White		Peacock	Stadium: County Ground; Attendance: 10,731

6 November 1991 16	Newcastle United	1–1	Cambridge United	Newcastle upon Tyne
15:00 GMT	Claridge		Hunt	Stadium: St James' Park; Attendance: 13,077

9 November 1991 17	Newcastle United	2–0	Grimsby Town	Newcastle upon Tyne
15:00 GMT	Hunt; Howey			Stadium: St James' Park; Attendance: 16,959

17 November 1991 18	Sunderland	1–1	Newcastle United	Sunderland
15:00 GMT	Davenport 21'		O'Brien 59'	Stadium: Roker Park; Attendance: 29,224

20 November 1991 19	Newcastle United	3–2	Southend United	Newcastle upon Tyne
	Peacock 9' (pen.), 14'; Hunt 31'		Angell 30'; Tilson 80'	Stadium: St James' Park; Attendance: 14,740

23 November 1991 20	Newcastle United	0–0	Blackburn Rovers	Newcastle upon Tyne
				Stadium: St James' Park; Attendance: 23,639

23 November 1991 21	Barnsley	3–0	Newcastle United	Barnsley
	Saville 25'; Robinson 40'; Rammell 44'			Stadium: Oakwell; Attendance: 9,458

7 December 1991 22	Newcastle United	2–2	Port Vale	Newcastle upon Tyne
	Makel 40, Peacock 61 pen		Hughes 43, Glover 63 pen	Stadium: St James Park; Attendance: 18,162

14 December 1991 23	Brighton & Hove Albion	2–2	Newcastle United	Hove
				Stadium: Goldstone Ground; Attendance: 7,658

20 December 1991 24	Plymouth Argyle	2–0	Newcastle United	Plymouth
				Stadium: Home Park; Attendance: 5,048

26 December 1991 25	Newcastle United	0–1	Middlesbrough	Newcastle upon Tyne
				Stadium: St James' Park; Attendance: 26,563

28 December 1991 26	Newcastle United	2–1	Bristol Rovers	Newcastle upon Tyne
				Stadium: St James' Park; Attendance: 19,329

1 January 1992 27	Southend United	4–0	Newcastle United	Southend-on-Sea
				Stadium: Roots Hall; Attendance: 9,458

11 January 1992 28	Watford	2–2	Newcastle United	Watford
				Stadium: Vicarage Road; Attendance: 9,811

18 January 1992 29	Newcastle United	3–4	Charlton Athletic	Newcastle upon Tyne
				Stadium: St James' Park; Attendance: 15,663

1 February 1992 30	Oxford United	5–2	Newcastle United	Oxford
				Stadium: Manor Ground; Attendance: 5,872

8 February 1992 31	Newcastle United	3–0	Bristol City	Newcastle upon Tyne
				Stadium: St James' Park; Attendance: 29,263
Note: Kevin Keegan's first game in charge of Newcastle United

15 February 1992 32	Blackburn Rovers	3–1	Newcastle United	Blackburn
				Stadium: Ewood Park; Attendance: 19,511

22 February 1992 33	Newcastle United	1–1	Barnsley	Newcastle upon Tyne
				Stadium: St James' Park; Attendance: 27,670

29 February 1992 34	Port Vale	0–1	Newcastle United	Stoke-on-Trent
				Stadium: Vale Park; Attendance: 10,321

7 March 1992 35	Newcastle United	0–1	Brighton & Hove Albion	Newcastle upon Tyne
				Stadium: St James' Park; Attendance: 24,597

10 March 1992 36	Cambridge United	0–2	Newcastle United	Cambridge
				Stadium: Abbey Stadium; Attendance: 8,254

14 March 1992 37	Newcastle United	3–1	Swindon Town	Newcastle upon Tyne
				Stadium: St James' Park; Attendance: 23,138

21 March 1992 38	Grimsby Town	1–1	Newcastle United	Grimsby
				Stadium: Blundell Park; Attendance: 11,613

29 March 1992 39	Newcastle United	1–0	Sunderland	Newcastle upon Tyne
				Stadium: St James' Park; Attendance: 30,306

31 March 1992 40	Wolverhampton Wanderers	6–2	Newcastle United	Wolverhampton
				Stadium: Molineux Stadium; Attendance: 14,480

4 April 1992 41	Newcastle United	2–3	Tranmere Rovers	Newcastle upon Tyne
				Stadium: St James' Park; Attendance: 21,125

11 April 1992 42	Ipswich Town	3–2	Newcastle United	Ipswich
				Stadium: Portman Road; Attendance: 20,673

18 April 1992 43	Newcastle United	0–1	Millwall	Newcastle upon Tyne
				Stadium: St James' Park; Attendance: 23,821

20 April 1992 44	Derby County	4–1	Newcastle United	Derby
				Stadium: Baseball Ground; Attendance: 21,363

25 April 1992 45	Newcastle United	1–0	Portsmouth	Newcastle upon Tyne
				Stadium: St James' Park; Attendance: 25,989

2 May 1992 46	Leicester City	1–2	Newcastle United	Leicester
				Stadium: Filbert Street; Attendance: 21,861

=== FA Cup ===
4 January 1992 Round 3	Bournemouth	0–0	Newcastle United	Bournemouth
15:00 GMT				Stadium: Dean Court; Attendance: 10,651

22 January 1992 Round 3 replay	Newcastle United	2–2 (3–4 p)	Bournemouth	Newcastle upon Tyne
19:45 GMT	Peacock 14'; Hunt 91'		Wood 79'; Bond 112'	Stadium: St James' Park; Attendance: 25,954

=== Football League Cup ===
24 September 1991 Second round First Leg	Crewe Alexandra	3–4	Newcastle United	Crewe
19:45 BST	Evans (2); Callaghan	[]	Hunt Peacock(3)	Stadium: Alexandra Stadium; Attendance: 4,251

9 October 1991 Second round Second Leg	Newcastle United	1–0	Crewe Alexandra	Newcastle upon Tyne
19:45 BST	Howey	[]		Stadium: St James' Park; Attendance: 9,197

29 October 1991 Third round	Peterborough United	1–0	Newcastle United	Peterborough
19:45 BST	Charlery	[]		Stadium: London Road Stadium; Attendance: 10,382

=== Zenith Data Systems Cup ===
1 October 1991 First round	Tranmere Rovers	6–6 (a.e.t.) (3–2 p)	Newcastle United	Birkenhead
19:45 BST	McNab 8'; Aldridge 19', 94', 120' (pen.); Steel 76'; Martindale 96'		Quinn 3', 24', 118' (pen.); Peacock 65', 110'; Clark 104'	Stadium: Prenton Park; Attendance: 4,056
