= 1950–51 in English football =

Football in England
- Season: 1950–51

Men's football
- First Division: Tottenham Hotspur
- Second Division: Preston North End
- FA Cup: Newcastle United

The 1950–51 season was the 71st season of competitive football in England.

== Overview ==
Tottenham Hotspur won their first league title, while Newcastle United defeated Blackpool 2–0 to win their fourth FA Cup. They would win it twice more over the next four seasons. Everton were relegated to the Second Division for only the second time in their history.

The league was expanded from 88 to 92 clubs for this season, with Scunthorpe United and Shrewsbury Town joining the Third Division North, and Colchester United joining the Third Division South. Gillingham were re-elected to the Football League twelve years after being voted out and also joined the Third Division South.

Sunderland signed Trevor Ford from Aston Villa for the then record fee of £30,000 (2012: £900,000).

At the end of the season, Matt Busby signed Birmingham City winger Johnny Berry for Manchester United for a club record fee of £25,000.

== Honours ==
Competition	Winner	Runner-up
First Division	Tottenham Hotspur (1)	Manchester United
Second Division	Preston North End	Manchester City
Third Division North	Rotherham United	Mansfield Town
Third Division South	Nottingham Forest	Norwich City
FA Cup	Newcastle United (4)	Blackpool
Charity Shield	England 1950 FIFA World Cup XI	FA Canada Touring XI
Home Championship	Scotland	England

Notes = Number in parentheses is the times that club has won that honour. * indicates new record for competition

== FA Cup ==
Newcastle United defeated Blackpool 2–0 in the 1951 FA Cup Final.

== Football League ==
=== First Division ===
Tottenham Hotspur, in their first top-flight season since 1935, surpassed all expectations by winning the league for the first time in their history. Manchester United finished second, continuing their wait for their first title under Matt Busby. Blackpool finished third, narrowly edging out FA Cup winners Newcastle United.

A dramatic finish to the season saw all the bottom three sides bracketed together on 32 points. Everton finished bottom after being thrashed 6-0 by Sheffield Wednesday (who were already all but assured of relegation) on the last day, with Chelsea surviving thanks to a four-game winning streak.

Pos	Team	Pld	W	D	L	GF	GA	GAv	Pts	Relegation
1	Tottenham Hotspur (C)	42	25	10	7	82	44	1.864	60	
2	Manchester United	42	24	8	10	74	40	1.850	56	
3	Blackpool	42	20	10	12	79	53	1.491	50	
4	Newcastle United	42	18	13	11	62	53	1.170	49	
5	Arsenal	42	19	9	14	73	56	1.304	47	
6	Middlesbrough	42	18	11	13	76	65	1.169	47	
7	Portsmouth	42	16	15	11	71	68	1.044	47	
8	Bolton Wanderers	42	19	7	16	64	61	1.049	45	
9	Liverpool	42	16	11	15	53	59	0.898	43	
10	Burnley	42	14	14	14	48	43	1.116	42	
11	Derby County	42	16	8	18	81	75	1.080	40	
12	Sunderland	42	12	16	14	63	73	0.863	40	
13	Stoke City	42	13	14	15	50	59	0.847	40	
14	Wolverhampton Wanderers	42	15	8	19	74	61	1.213	38	
15	Aston Villa	42	12	13	17	66	68	0.971	37	
16	West Bromwich Albion	42	13	11	18	53	61	0.869	37	
17	Charlton Athletic	42	14	9	19	63	80	0.788	37	
18	Fulham	42	13	11	18	52	68	0.765	37	
19	Huddersfield Town	42	15	6	21	64	92	0.696	36	
20	Chelsea	42	12	8	22	53	65	0.815	32	
21	Sheffield Wednesday (R)	42	12	8	22	64	83	0.771	32	Relegation to the Second Division
22	Everton (R)	42	12	8	22	48	86	0.558	32	Relegation to the Second Division

Source: World Football
Rules for classification: 1) Points; 2) Goal average; 3) Goals scored
(C) Champions; (R) Relegated

=== Second Division ===
Preston North End won the division, with Manchester City earning promotion as runners-up, continuing the yo-yo club existence of both sides, with Preston having been out of the top-flight for two seasons, and City for one season.

Grimsby Town and Chesterfield were both relegated to the third tier.

Pos	Team	Pld	W	D	L	GF	GA	GAv	Pts	Qualification or relegation
1	Preston North End (C, P)	42	26	5	11	91	49	1.857	57	Promotion to the First Division
2	Manchester City (P)	42	19	14	9	89	61	1.459	52	Promotion to the First Division
3	Cardiff City	42	17	16	9	53	45	1.178	50	
4	Birmingham City	42	20	9	13	64	53	1.208	49	
5	Leeds United	42	20	8	14	63	55	1.145	48	
6	Blackburn Rovers	42	19	8	15	65	66	0.985	46	
7	Coventry City	42	19	7	16	75	59	1.271	45	
8	Sheffield United	42	16	12	14	72	62	1.161	44	
9	Brentford	42	18	8	16	75	74	1.014	44	
10	Hull City	42	16	11	15	74	70	1.057	43	
11	Doncaster Rovers	42	15	13	14	64	68	0.941	43	
12	Southampton	42	15	13	14	66	73	0.904	43	
13	West Ham United	42	16	10	16	68	69	0.986	42	
14	Leicester City	42	15	11	16	68	58	1.172	41	
15	Barnsley	42	15	10	17	74	68	1.088	40	
16	Queens Park Rangers	42	15	10	17	71	82	0.866	40	
17	Notts County	42	13	13	16	61	60	1.017	39	
18	Swansea Town	42	16	4	22	54	77	0.701	36	
19	Luton Town	42	9	14	19	57	70	0.814	32	
20	Bury	42	12	8	22	60	86	0.698	32	
21	Chesterfield (R)	42	9	12	21	44	69	0.638	30	Relegation to the Third Division North
22	Grimsby Town (R)	42	8	12	22	61	95	0.642	28	Relegation to the Third Division North

Rules for classification: 1) Points; 2) Goal average; 3) Goals scored
(C) Champions; (P) Promoted; (R) Relegated

=== Third Division North ===
Rotherham United convincingly won the division, with Mansfield Town and Carlisle United both having more-than-respectable seasons but not being able to catch Rotherham.

New Brighton, who had struggled with low attendances and financial problems since their Sandheys Park ground was destroyed by bombing in World War II, finished bottom and did not make a serious bid to be re-elected, effectively resigning their membership of the Football League. Their place was taken by Workington for the following season. Accrington Stanley retained their membership of the league as a consequence.

Pos	Team	Pld	W	D	L	GF	GA	GAv	Pts	Promotion or relegation
1	Rotherham United (C, P)	46	31	9	6	103	41	2.512	71	Promotion to the Second Division
2	Mansfield Town	46	26	12	8	78	48	1.625	64	
3	Carlisle United	46	25	12	9	79	50	1.580	62	
4	Tranmere Rovers	46	24	11	11	83	62	1.339	59	
5	Lincoln City	46	25	8	13	89	58	1.534	58	
6	Bradford (Park Avenue)	46	23	8	15	90	72	1.250	54	
7	Bradford City	46	21	10	15	90	63	1.429	52	
8	Gateshead	46	21	8	17	84	62	1.355	50	
9	Crewe Alexandra	46	19	10	17	61	60	1.017	48	
10	Stockport County	46	20	8	18	63	63	1.000	48	
11	Rochdale	46	17	11	18	69	62	1.113	45	
12	Scunthorpe & Lindsey United	46	13	18	15	58	57	1.018	44	
13	Chester	46	17	9	20	62	64	0.969	43	
14	Wrexham	46	15	12	19	55	71	0.775	42	
15	Oldham Athletic	46	16	8	22	73	73	1.000	40	
16	Hartlepools United	46	16	7	23	64	66	0.970	39	
17	York City	46	12	15	19	66	77	0.857	39	
18	Darlington	46	13	13	20	59	77	0.766	39	
19	Barrow	46	16	6	24	51	76	0.671	38	
20	Shrewsbury Town	46	15	7	24	43	74	0.581	37	Transferred to the Third Division South
21	Southport	46	13	10	23	56	72	0.778	36	
22	Halifax Town	46	11	12	23	50	69	0.725	34	
23	Accrington Stanley	46	11	10	25	42	101	0.416	32	Re-elected
24	New Brighton (R)	46	11	8	27	40	90	0.444	30	Failed re-election and demoted

Source: rsssf.com
(C) Champions; (P) Promoted; (R) Relegated

=== Third Division South ===
Nottingham Forest won promotion back to the Second Division at the second time of asking, with Cardiff City finishing a convincing second, but not being able to overhaul Forest.

Watford and Crystal Palace were both forced to apply for re-election, but New Brighton's plight meant neither club was in any real danger of losing their place in the Football League.

Pos	Team	Pld	W	D	L	GF	GA	GAv	Pts	Promotion or qualification
1	Nottingham Forest (C, P)	46	30	10	6	110	40	2.750	70	Promotion to the Second Division
2	Norwich City	46	25	14	7	82	45	1.822	64	
3	Reading	46	21	15	10	88	53	1.660	57	
4	Plymouth Argyle	46	24	9	13	85	55	1.545	57	
5	Millwall	46	23	10	13	80	57	1.404	56	
6	Bristol Rovers	46	20	15	11	64	42	1.524	55	
7	Southend United	46	21	10	15	92	69	1.333	52	
8	Ipswich Town	46	23	6	17	69	58	1.190	52	
9	Bournemouth & Boscombe Athletic	46	22	7	17	65	57	1.140	51	
10	Bristol City	46	20	11	15	64	59	1.085	51	
11	Newport County	46	19	9	18	77	70	1.100	47	
12	Port Vale	46	16	13	17	60	65	0.923	45	
13	Brighton & Hove Albion	46	13	17	16	71	79	0.899	43	
14	Exeter City	46	18	6	22	62	85	0.729	42	
15	Walsall	46	15	10	21	52	62	0.839	40	
16	Colchester United	46	14	12	20	63	76	0.829	40	
17	Swindon Town	46	18	4	24	55	67	0.821	40	
18	Aldershot	46	15	10	21	56	88	0.636	40	
19	Leyton Orient	46	15	8	23	53	75	0.707	38	
20	Torquay United	46	14	9	23	64	81	0.790	37	
21	Northampton Town	46	10	16	20	55	67	0.821	36	
22	Gillingham	46	13	9	24	69	101	0.683	35	
23	Watford	46	9	11	26	54	88	0.614	29	Re-elected
24	Crystal Palace	46	8	11	27	33	84	0.393	27	Re-elected

(C) Champions; (P) Promoted

=== Top goalscorers ===
First Division

- Stan Mortensen (Blackpool) – 30 goals

Second Division

- Cec McCormack (Barnsley) – 33 goals

Third Division North

- Jack Shaw (Rotherham United) – 37 goals

Third Division South

- Wally Ardron (Nottingham Forest) – 36 goals
