= Robert Rutherford =

Robert Rutherford may refer to:

- Robert Rutherford (congressman) (1728–1803), American pioneer, soldier and statesman, United States representative from Virginia 1793–97
- Robert Rutherford (cricketer) (1886-1960), New Zealand cricketer
- Robert L. Rutherford (1938–2013), United States Air Force general
- Bob Rutherford (footballer) (1878–?), English footballer
- Bob Rutherford (clinician) (died 1995), chairman of Newcastle United F. C.
- Robert B. Rutherford (1931–2013), American vascular surgeon and physician
