= Ross Wilson (football executive) =

Scottish football executive

Personal information
- Full name: Ross Wilson
- Date of birth: 4 May 1984 (age 42)
- Place of birth: Falkirk, Scotland

Team information
- Current team: Newcastle United

Managerial career
- Years: Team
- 2004–2011: Falkirk (Head of Football Development)
- 2011–2012: Watford (Football Business Director)
- 2012–2015: Huddersfield Town (Head of Football Operations)
- 2015–2019: Southampton (Director of Football Operations)
- 2019–2023: Rangers (Sporting Director)
- 2023–2025: Nottingham Forest (Chief Football Officer)
- 2025–: Newcastle United (Sporting Director)

Ross Wilson (born 4 May 1984) is a Scottish football executive who serves as sporting director of Premier League club Newcastle United.

He has previously served as Chief Football Officer of Nottingham Forest, Sporting Director of Rangers, Director of Football Operations at Southampton, and Executive Director and Head of Football Operations at Huddersfield Town.

== Early life and education ==
Wilson was born in Falkirk on 4 May 1984 and grew up in nearby Larbert. He attended Larbert High School before graduating from the University of Strathclyde with a degree in Social Science. While working at Falkirk, he completed a master's degree in Sports Management at the University of Stirling.

== Career ==
=== Falkirk ===
Following his graduation, Wilson joined his boyhood club Falkirk as an Education and Welfare Officer. He later became Head of Football Development and Football Administration, overseeing the club's academy, player welfare programme and football administration. During his seven years at Falkirk, Wilson established a reputation as one of Scotland's leading young football administrators while completing his postgraduate studies at the University of Stirling.

=== Watford ===
In 2011, Wilson joined Watford as Football Business Director. He was responsible for a wide range of football operations, including player recruitment, contract negotiations, football administration, medical and sports science services, and the club's academy and player development programmes.

Wilson spent just over a year at Watford before leaving in July 2012 to join Huddersfield Town as Executive Director and Head of Football Operations.

=== Huddersfield Town ===
In July 2012, Wilson was appointed Executive Director and Head of Football Operations at Huddersfield Town. His responsibilities included player recruitment, football administration, sports science, medicine, performance analysis, academy development and the club's overall football strategy.

Wilson worked alongside managers Simon Grayson, Mark Robins, Chris Powell and David Wagner during his three-year spell at the club. Following Wagner's appointment in November 2015, Huddersfield adopted a new football structure and playing philosophy inspired by the German coach's methods.

Wilson left Huddersfield in July 2015 to join Premier League club Southampton as Director of Football Operations.

=== Southampton ===
Wilson was appointed Director of Football Operations at Southampton in July 2015, succeeding Les Reed in overseeing many of the club's day-to-day football operations.

Working alongside executive director Les Reed, Wilson was responsible for football operations across the first team and academy. His remit included recruitment, player contracts, sports science, medical services, performance analysis and the integration of academy players into the senior squad.

During Wilson's four years at Southampton, the club continued its established player development and recruitment model while competing in the Premier League and European competition. He worked under managers Ronald Koeman, Claude Puel, Mauricio Pellegrino, Mark Hughes and Ralph Hasenhüttl.

In October 2019, Wilson left Southampton after accepting the role of Sporting Director at Scottish Premiership club Rangers.

=== Rangers ===
On 14 October 2019, Wilson was appointed Sporting Director of Rangers, succeeding Mark Allen. He officially took up the role in November 2019 after leaving Southampton.

As Sporting Director, Wilson was responsible for all football operations across Rangers' men's first team, academy and women's programme. His remit included player recruitment, performance services, medical operations, sports science, analysis, football administration and long-term sporting strategy.

Wilson worked alongside manager Steven Gerrard during one of the club's most successful modern periods. Rangers won the 2020–21 Scottish Premiership, finishing the league season unbeaten and ending Celtic's run of nine consecutive league titles.

Following Gerrard's departure to Aston Villa in November 2021, Wilson led the process to appoint Giovanni van Bronckhorst as Rangers' new manager.

During Van Bronckhorst's first season, Rangers reached the 2022 UEFA Europa League final, where they were defeated by Eintracht Frankfurt on penalties, and won the 2021–22 Scottish Cup.

Wilson also oversaw a significant period of player trading. During his tenure, Rangers completed several high-value transfers, including the sales of Nathan Patterson to Everton, Joe Aribo to Southampton, and Calvin Bassey to Ajax, the latter becoming one of the highest transfer fees received in the club's history.

In November 2022, following a poor start to the season, Rangers dismissed Van Bronckhorst. Wilson subsequently appointed Michael Beale as manager after a compensation agreement was reached with Queens Park Rangers.

On 10 April 2023, Rangers announced that Wilson would leave the club by mutual consent.

Wilson later described Rangers as one of the defining periods of his professional career, citing the club's league title, Scottish Cup victory and run to the Europa League final among its major achievements.

=== Nottingham Forest ===
On 10 April 2023, Wilson was appointed Chief Football Officer at Nottingham Forest, succeeding Filippo Giraldi.

As Chief Football Officer, Wilson was responsible for the club's football strategy and operations across the men's first team, academy and recruitment departments. He also oversaw sports science, medicine, performance analysis and football administration.

During Wilson's tenure, Forest established themselves in the Premier League and qualified for European competition for the first time since the 1995–96 season. The club also recorded several significant player sales, including Brennan Johnson to Tottenham Hotspur and Anthony Elanga to Newcastle United, while continuing to invest heavily in the first-team squad.

Wilson also oversaw investment in the club's football infrastructure and academy as part of owner Evangelos Marinakis' long-term strategy.

=== Newcastle United ===
On 11 October 2025, Wilson was appointed Sporting Director of Newcastle United, succeeding Paul Mitchell after the club triggered the release clause in his Nottingham Forest contract.

Wilson became responsible for sporting strategy, recruitment and football development across Newcastle's men's, women's and academy teams, working alongside the club's executive leadership and football department.

Following the appointment of chief executive David Hopkinson in September 2025, Wilson became part of a new executive structure intended to provide greater long-term stability following a period of significant leadership change at the club.

During his first year at Newcastle, Wilson led a restructuring of the club's football department, including the appointment of Jack Ross as Head of Football Strategy and the expansion of the club's recruitment and performance departments. He also led the recruitment process that resulted in the appointment of German coach Matthias Jaissle as head coach in August 2026 following the departure of Eddie Howe.
