= David Hopkinson =

Canadian sports executive (born 1970)

Chief Executive Officer of Newcastle United
- Incumbent
- Assumed office 5 September 2025
- Chairman: Yasir Al-Rumayyan
- Preceded by: Darren Eales

Personal details
- Born: David Gordon Hopkinson; November 1970 (age 55) Canada
- Occupation: Sports executive

David Gordon Hopkinson (born November 1970) is a Canadian sports executive who is the chief executive officer of Premier League club Newcastle United since September 2025.

He was previously president and chief operating officer of Madison Square Garden Sports, global head of partnerships at Real Madrid CF, and chief commercial officer of Maple Leaf Sports & Entertainment (MLSE).

== Early life ==
Hopkinson was born in Canada in November 1970. He is from Toronto, Ontario.

== Career ==
=== Maple Leaf Sports & Entertainment ===
Hopkinson began his career in professional sport in ticket sales. He joined Maple Leaf Sports & Entertainment (MLSE) in 1994 and remained with the organisation for almost 25 years, holding a succession of commercial and leadership positions.

He ultimately became MLSE's chief commercial officer. In that role, he oversaw commercial activities across the organisation's sports and entertainment portfolio, which included the Toronto Maple Leafs of the National Hockey League, the Toronto Raptors of the National Basketball Association, Toronto FC of Major League Soccer, and the Toronto Argonauts of the Canadian Football League.

His responsibilities included ticketing, sponsorship, marketing, merchandise, food and beverage, and commercial partnerships. He was also involved in MLSE's relationships with corporate partners and the commercial operation of its teams and venues.

=== Real Madrid ===
Hopkinson joined Real Madrid CF in 2018 as Global Head of Partnerships.

At Real Madrid, he led the club's global partnerships programme and was a member of its executive team. His work included managing the club's international sponsorship portfolio and developing commercial relationships with global companies.

His period at the club coincided with the redevelopment of the Santiago Bernabéu Stadium.

=== Madison Square Garden Sports ===
On 31 August 2020, Madison Square Garden Sports announced that Hopkinson had been appointed Executive Vice President of MSG Sports and President of Team Business Operations.

In that position, he led the commercial strategy and business operations of MSG Sports' teams, including the New York Knicks, New York Rangers, Westchester Knicks, Hartford Wolf Pack, Counter Logic Gaming, and Knicks Gaming. His responsibilities included strategic planning, marketing, ticketing, in-game experience, community relations and fan development.

In September 2022, Hopkinson was promoted to president and chief operating officer of MSG Sports. As President and COO, he continued to oversee the company's business operations and worked with its executive management team on corporate strategy.

Hopkinson left Madison Square Garden Sports in April 2024.

=== Newcastle United ===
On 4 September 2025, Newcastle United announced Hopkinson's appointment as chief executive officer. He formally joined the club on 5 September 2025, succeeding Darren Eales, who stepped down for health reasons.

His appointment followed a handover process with Eales. As chief executive, Hopkinson leads the club's business operations and executive team.

In June 2026, Newcastle announced the appointments of Graeme Johnson as chief people officer, Dave O'Connor as chief revenue officer, and Steven Taylor as chief marketing officer. They joined an executive team that also included chief operating officer Brad Miller and chief financial officer Simon Capper.

Hopkinson has spoken about increasing Newcastle's commercial revenue, developing its international profile and improving its infrastructure. He has also overseen the club's consideration of options for St James' Park and plans for a new training facility.

Following Eddie Howe's departure in July 2026, Hopkinson was involved alongside Sporting Director Ross Wilson in the process of appointing Matthias Jaissle as Newcastle's new head coach. Jaissle was formally appointed on 5 August 2026, with Hopkinson describing him as "one of the most exciting and highly regarded young coaches in football".

== Other activities ==
Hopkinson has been on the board of directors of Canada Basketball since 2023. He has also been on the boards of Canada's Walk of Fame and the Women's College Hospital Foundation.

He has been on the Chancellor's Advisory Committee at McGill University.

== Honours ==
Hopkinson received the Queen Elizabeth II Diamond Jubilee Medal in 2013 for his contributions to Canada.

Preceded by Darren Eales	Chief Executive Officer of Newcastle United F.C. 2025–present	Succeeded by Incumbent
