= Bobby Cowell =

English footballer (1922–1996)

Personal information
- Full name: Robert Cowell
- Date of birth: 5 December 1922
- Place of birth: Trimdon, England
- Date of death: 11 January 1996 (aged 73)
- Place of death: Newcastle upon Tyne, England
- Position: Right-back

Youth career
- Blackhall Colliery Welfare

Senior career*
Years	Team	Apps	(Gls)
1943–1955	Newcastle United	289	(0)
Total		289	(0)
- * Club domestic league appearances and goals

Robert Cowell (5 December 1922 – 11 January 1996) was an English football right-back. During his football career he only played for one club, Newcastle United. Despite his success with Newcastle he failed to win any caps for the England national team.

== Career ==
Cowell was born in Trimdon Grange and worked as a coalminer at Blackhall Colliery as a teenager, as well as playing for the non-league football team Blackhall Colliery Welfare. He joined Newcastle in October 1943 at the age of 20 – a time when the club were only playing friendly matches as World War II meant all the football leagues in England were suspended. He made 81 appearances for Newcastle.

He made his Football League debut on 1 February 1947 in a match against Barnsley and would feature a further 12 times before the end of the season. He only played 19 league games for the rest of the following season as Newcastle were promoted into the First Division. However, he bided his time and became the club's first choice right-back for the 1948–49 season.

Along with Jackie Milburn and Bobby Mitchel Cowell featured in all three of Newcastle's FA Cup successes during the 1950s. He won his first FA Cup winners medal in 1951 when Newcastle beat Blackpool 2–0 and the following year he was part of the team that surprised Arsenal and the first team to retain the cup since 1891. He won his third FA Cup title in 1955 against Manchester City.

== Retirement and death ==
Cowell was forced to retire in 1955 at the age of 33 when he picked up a serious knee injury during a pre-season tour of Germany. He had made 330 appearances for Newcastle.

One of Newcastle United's top goalscorers of all time, Jackie Milburn, stated that Cowell was "the best uncapped fullback I've ever known".

Cowell died on 11 January 1996 in Newcastle upon Tyne, aged 73.

== Career statistics ==
Appearances and goals by club, season and competition
Club	Season	League		FA Cup		Other (Note: Includes Charity Shield and Coronation Cup.)		Total	
Club	Season	Apps	Goals	Apps	Goals	Apps	Goals	Apps	Goals
Newcastle United	1945–46	–		2	0	0	0	2	0
Newcastle United	1946–47	13	0	4	0	0	0	17	0
Newcastle United	1947–48	19	0	0	0	0	0	19	0
Newcastle United	1948–49	38	0	1	0	0	0	39	0
Newcastle United	1949–50	20	0	0	0	0	0	20	0
Newcastle United	1950–51	42	0	8	0	0	0	50	0
Newcastle United	1951–52	40	0	7	0	0	0	47	0
Newcastle United	1952–53	36	0	2	0	1	0	39	0
Newcastle United	1953–54	41	0	4	0	2	0	47	0
Newcastle United	1954–55	40	0	10	0	0	0	50	0
Total		289	0	38	0	3	0	330	0

== Honours ==
Newcastle United

- FA Cup: 1950–51, 1951–52, 1954–55
