= Wallace Hurford =

Wallace Edwin Hurford (died March 1967) was a dentist and chairman of Newcastle United F.C. from 1960 to 1963.

== Career ==
Hurford was educated at Durham University where he studied dentistry and was commissioned as lieutenant in the dental service branch of the Royal Army Medical Corps on 16 December 1915 during the First World War.

Hurford became chairman of Newcastle United F.C. in 1963. During his tenure as chairman Hurford received a writ from one of the players, George Eastham, on the basis that, as was typical of the retain and transfer system operating at the time, Hurford was refusing to allow him to transfer and this was an unfair restraint of trade. The resulting court case led to reform of the transfer market.

Hurford stood down as chairman in 1963 and died in Newcastle upon Tyne in March 1967.
