= Lee Payne =

English footballer and agent

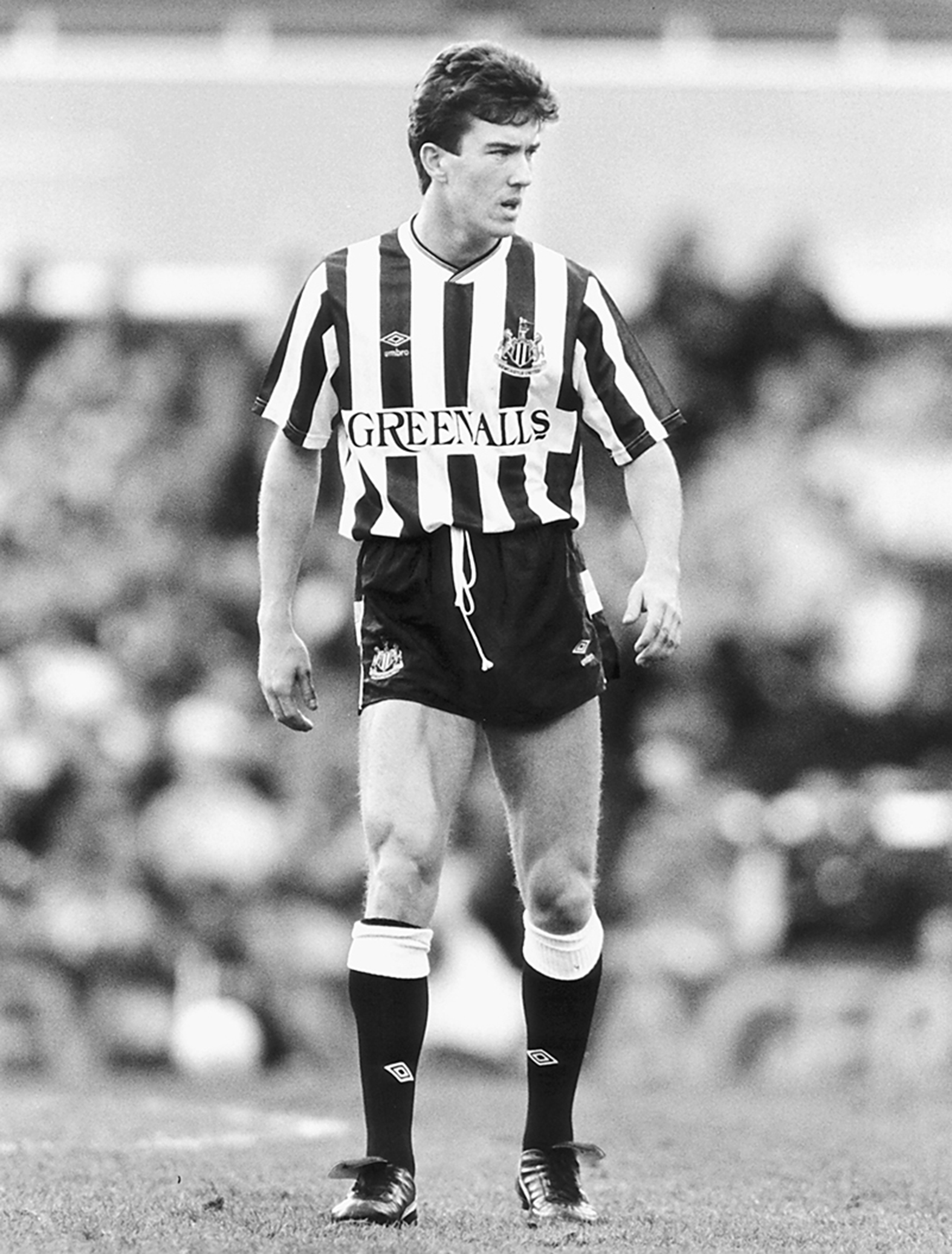

Personal information
- Full name: Lee John Payne
- Date of birth: 12 December 1966 (age 59)
- Place of birth: Luton, England
- Position: Left winger

Youth career
- Luton Town

Senior career*
Years	Team	Apps	(Gls)
- Hitchin Town
1987–1988	Barnet	6	(0)
1988	→ Stevenage Borough (loan)	2	(0)
1988–1989	Newcastle United	7	(0)
1989–1990	Reading	37	(3)
1990–1991	BV Veendam	32	(10)
1991–1993	FC Emmen	25	(2)
1993	Gateshead	1	(0)
1994–1996	BV Veendam	6	(1)
Total		116	(16)
- * Club domestic league appearances and goals

Lee John Payne (born 12 December 1966) is an English former professional footballer and currently a football agent. He played as a left-winger in both England and the Netherlands.

Payne began his career with Hitchin Town, Dunstable and Luton Town. He then signed for Conference team Barnet, making nine appearances in all competitions and scoring once in the FA Trophy against Windsor & Eton. During his time at Barnet, he had a brief spell on loan with Isthmian League Division One team Stevenage Borough, making two appearances.

After a trial at Leicester City, Payne signed for Newcastle United in September 1988. He made his debut in October in a 3–0 victory against Middlesbrough, and made seven appearances before moving to Reading later in the same season.

After 37 appearances and three goals for Reading in all competitions, Payne moved to the Netherlands to play for Eerste Divisie club BV Veendam in 1990. He made 32 league appearances for the club scoring ten goals, before joining FC Emmen. He returned to England with Gateshead, for whom he played once in the Conference before rejoining BV Veendam. He subsequently retired from football due to an injury.

After retiring, Payne became a football agent.

Payne's father was a manager in non-league football.
