= Paul Sweeney (footballer) =

Scottish Footballer

Personal information
- Date of birth: 10 January 1965 (age 61)
- Place of birth: Glasgow, Scotland
- Position: Defender

Youth career
- Whitfield Star
- Tynecastle

Senior career*
Years	Team	Apps	(Gls)
1982–1988	Raith Rovers	204	(8)
1988–1991	Newcastle United	36	(0)
1991–1993	St Johnstone	10	(0)
1993–1994	Gateshead		
1994–1995	Hartlepool United		
1995–1996	Durham City		
1996–1997	Gateshead		
1997–1998	Morpeth Town		
1998–1999	South Shields		
- * Club domestic league appearances and goals

Paul Sweeney (born 10 January 1965) is a Scottish former professional footballer who played as a defender for Raith Rovers, Newcastle United and St Johnstone.

== Club career ==
=== Youth career ===
Sweeney's first football team was Whitfield Star in his hometown of Whitburn. After playing there, he was signed to Tynecastle.

=== Club career ===
He was scouted by Raith Rovers and after a trial period, signed for the club in 1982. He went on to make 204 appearances for the club and was inducted into the club's hall of fame in 2017.

The defender signed for Newcastle United in 1988 and made his debut against Southampton at The Dell.
