= Newcastle United F.C. in European football =

English club in European football

Newcastle United in European football
- Club: Newcastle United
- Seasons played: 18
- Most appearances: Shay Given (61)
- Top scorer: Alan Shearer (30)
- First entry: 1968–69 Inter-Cities Fairs Cup
- Latest entry: 2025–26 UEFA Champions League

Titles
- Intertoto Cup: (2006)
- Inter-Cities Fairs Cup: (1969)

Newcastle United F.C. first played European football with their appearance in the 1968–69 Inter-Cities Fairs Cup, a competition which they won. Their first Champions League appearance came in 1997–98. Newcastle's first and last appearance in the Cup Winners' Cup came in 1998–99.

As of the 2025–26 season, they have played a total of 18 seasons in European football. Alan Shearer is the club's leading goalscorer in European competition with 30 goals. Shay Given has made the most appearances in European competition for Newcastle with 61.

== Results by season ==
Match won	Match drawn	Match lost	Champions	Runners-up

Season	Competition	Round	Country	Opponent	Home	Away	Aggregate
1968–69	Inter-Cities Fairs Cup	First round	(Netherlands)	Feyenoord	4–0	0–2	4–2
1968–69	Inter-Cities Fairs Cup	Second round	(Portugal)	Sporting CP	1–0	1–1	2–1
1968–69	Inter-Cities Fairs Cup	Third round	(Spain)	Zaragoza	2–1	2–3	4–4 (a)
1968–69	Inter-Cities Fairs Cup	Quarter-finals	(Portugal)	Vitória de Setúbal	5–1	1–3	6–4
1968–69	Inter-Cities Fairs Cup	Semi-finals	(Scotland)	Rangers	2–0	0–0	2–0
1968–69	Inter-Cities Fairs Cup	Final	(Hungary)	Újpest	3–0	3–2	6–2
1969–70	Inter-Cities Fairs Cup	First round	(Scotland)	Dundee United	1–0	2–1	3–1
1969–70	Inter-Cities Fairs Cup	Second round	(Portugal)	Porto	1–0	0–0	1–0
1969–70	Inter-Cities Fairs Cup	Third round	(England)	Southampton	0–0	1–1	1–1 (a)
1969–70	Inter-Cities Fairs Cup	Quarter-finals	(Belgium)	Anderlecht	3–1	0–2	3–3 (a)
1970–71	Inter-Cities Fairs Cup	First round	(Italy)	Inter Milan	2–0	1–1	3–1
1970–71	Inter-Cities Fairs Cup	Second round	(Hungary)	Pécsi Dózsa	2–0	0–2 (a.e.t.)	2–2 (2–5 p)
1977–78	UEFA Cup	First round	(Republic of Ireland)	Bohemians	4–0	0–0	4–0
1977–78	UEFA Cup	Second round	(France)	Bastia	1–3	1–2	2–5
1994–95	UEFA Cup	First round	(Belgium)	Antwerp	5–2	5–0	10–2
1994–95	UEFA Cup	Second round	(Spain)	Athletic Bilbao	3–2	0–1	3–3 (a)
1996–97	UEFA Cup	First round	(Sweden)	Halmstad	4–0	1–2	5–2
1996–97	UEFA Cup	Second round	(Hungary)	Ferencváros	4–0	2–3	6–3
1996–97	UEFA Cup	Third round	(France)	Metz	2–0	1–1	3–1
1996–97	UEFA Cup	Quarter-finals	(France)	Monaco	0–1	0–3	0–4
1997–98	UEFA Champions League	Second qualifying round	(Croatia)	Croatia Zagreb	2–1	2–2	4–3
1997–98	UEFA Champions League	Group stage	(Ukraine)	Dynamo Kyiv	2–0	2–2	3rd
1997–98	UEFA Champions League	Group stage	(Netherlands)	PSV Eindhoven	0–2	0–1	3rd
1997–98	UEFA Champions League	Group stage	(Spain)	Barcelona	3–2	0–1	3rd
1998–99	UEFA Cup Winners' Cup	First round	(Federal Republic of Yugoslavia)	Partizan	2–1	0–1	2–2 (a)
1999–2000	UEFA Cup	First round	(Bulgaria)	CSKA Sofia	2–2	2–0	4–2
1999–2000	UEFA Cup	Second round	(Switzerland)	Zürich	3–1	2–1	5–2
1999–2000	UEFA Cup	Third round	(Italy)	Roma	0–0	0–1	0–1
2001–02	UEFA Intertoto Cup	Third round	(Belgium)	Lokeren	1–0	4–0	5–0
2001–02	UEFA Intertoto Cup	Semi-finals	(Germany)	1860 Munich	3–1	3–2	6–3
2001–02	UEFA Intertoto Cup	Finals	(France)	Troyes	4–4	0–0	4–4 (a)
2002–03	UEFA Champions League	Third qualifying round	(Bosnia and Herzegovina)	Željezničar	1–0	4–0	5–0
2002–03	UEFA Champions League	Group stage	(Italy)	Juventus	1–0	0–2	2nd
2002–03	UEFA Champions League	Group stage	(Ukraine)	Dynamo Kyiv	2–1	0–2	2nd
2002–03	UEFA Champions League	Group stage	(Netherlands)	Feyenoord	0–1	3–2	2nd
2002–03	UEFA Champions League	Second group stage	(Spain)	Barcelona	0–2	1–3	3rd
2002–03	UEFA Champions League	Second group stage	(Italy)	Inter Milan	1–4	2–2	3rd
2002–03	UEFA Champions League	Second group stage	(Germany)	Bayer Leverkusen	3–1	3–1	3rd
2003–04	UEFA Champions League	Third qualifying round	(Serbia and Montenegro)	Partizan	0–1 (a.e.t.)	1–0	1–1 (3–4 p)
2003–04	UEFA Cup	First round	(Netherlands)	NAC Breda	5–0	1–0	6–0
2003–04	UEFA Cup	Second round	(Switzerland)	Basel	1–0	3–2	4–2
2003–04	UEFA Cup	Third round	(Norway)	Vålerenga	3–1	1–1	4–2
2003–04	UEFA Cup	Fourth round	(Spain)	Mallorca	4–1	3–0	7–1
2003–04	UEFA Cup	Quarter-finals	(Netherlands)	PSV Eindhoven	2–1	1–1	3–2
2003–04	UEFA Cup	Semi-finals	(France)	Marseille	0–0	0–2	0–2
2004–05	UEFA Cup	First round	(Israel)	Bnei Sakhnin	2–0	5–1	7–1
2004–05	UEFA Cup	Group stage	(France)	Sochaux	—N/a	4–0	1st
2004–05	UEFA Cup	Group stage	(Portugal)	Sporting CP	1–1	—N/a	1st
2004–05	UEFA Cup	Group stage	(Greece)	Panionios	—N/a	1–0	1st
2004–05	UEFA Cup	Group stage	(Georgia (country))	Dinamo Tbilisi	2–0	—N/a	1st
2004–05	UEFA Cup	Round of 32	(Netherlands)	Heerenveen	2–1	2–1	4–2
2004–05	UEFA Cup	Round of 16	(Greece)	Olympiacos	3–1	4–0	7–1
2004–05	UEFA Cup	Quarter-finals	(Portugal)	Sporting CP	1–0	1–4	2–4
2005–06	UEFA Intertoto Cup	Third round	(Slovakia)	Dubnica	2–0	3–1	5–1
2005–06	UEFA Intertoto Cup	Semi-finals	(Spain)	Deportivo La Coruña	1–2	1–2	2–4
2006–07	UEFA Intertoto Cup	Third round	(Norway)	Lillestrøm	1–1	3–0	4–1
2006–07	UEFA Cup	Second qualifying round	(Latvia)	Ventspils	0–0	1–0	1–0
2006–07	UEFA Cup	First round	(Estonia)	Levadia Tallinn	1–0	2–1	3–1
2006–07	UEFA Cup	Group stage	(Spain)	Celta Vigo	2–1	—N/a	1st
2006–07	UEFA Cup	Group stage	(Turkey)	Fenerbahçe	1–0	—N/a	1st
2006–07	UEFA Cup	Group stage	(Italy)	Palermo	—N/a	1–0	1st
2006–07	UEFA Cup	Group stage	(Germany)	Eintracht Frankfurt	—N/a	0–0	1st
2006–07	UEFA Cup	Round of 32	(Belgium)	Zulte Waregem	1–0	3–1	4–1
2006–07	UEFA Cup	Round of 16	(Netherlands)	AZ	4–2	0–2	4–4 (a)
2012–13	UEFA Europa League	Play-off round	(Greece)	Atromitos	1–0	1–1	2–1
2012–13	UEFA Europa League	Group stage	(Portugal)	Marítimo	1–1	0–0	2nd
2012–13	UEFA Europa League	Group stage	(France)	Bordeaux	3–0	0–2	2nd
2012–13	UEFA Europa League	Group stage	(Belgium)	Club Brugge	1–0	2–2	2nd
2012–13	UEFA Europa League	Round of 32	(Ukraine)	Metalist Kharkiv	0–0	1–0	1–0
2012–13	UEFA Europa League	Round of 16	(Russia)	Anzhi Makhachkala	1–0	0–0	1–0
2012–13	UEFA Europa League	Quarter-finals	(Portugal)	Benfica	1–1	1–3	2–4
2023–24	UEFA Champions League	Group stage	(Italy)	Milan	1–2	0–0	4th
2023–24	UEFA Champions League	Group stage	(France)	Paris Saint-Germain	4–1	1–1	4th
2023–24	UEFA Champions League	Group stage	(Germany)	Borussia Dortmund	0–1	0–2	4th
2025–26	UEFA Champions League	League phase	(Spain)	Barcelona	1–2	—N/a	12th
2025–26	UEFA Champions League	League phase	(Belgium)	Union Saint-Gilloise	—N/a	4–0	12th
2025–26	UEFA Champions League	League phase	(Portugal)	Benfica	3–0	—N/a	12th
2025–26	UEFA Champions League	League phase	(Spain)	Athletic Bilbao	2–0	—N/a	12th
2025–26	UEFA Champions League	League phase	(France)	Marseille	—N/a	1–2	12th
2025–26	UEFA Champions League	League phase	(Germany)	Bayer Leverkusen	—N/a	2–2	12th
2025–26	UEFA Champions League	League phase	(Netherlands)	PSV Eindhoven	3–0	—N/a	12th
2025–26	UEFA Champions League	League phase	(France)	Paris Saint-Germain	—N/a	1–1	12th
2025–26	UEFA Champions League	Knockout phase play-offs	(Azerbaijan)	Qarabağ	3–2	6–1	9–3
2025–26	UEFA Champions League	Round of 16	(Spain)	Barcelona	1–1	2–7	3–8

Source for Fairs Cup:

== Overall record ==
As of 18 March 2026

Competition	Pld	W	D	L	GF	GA	GD	Win%
UEFA Champions League	42	18	8	16	68	58	+10	42.86
UEFA Cup/UEFA Europa League	72	43	17	12	123	60	+63	59.72
UEFA Cup Winners' Cup	2	1	0	1	2	2	+0	50.00
Inter-Cities Fairs Cup	24	13	6	5	37	21	+16	54.17
UEFA Intertoto Cup	12	7	3	2	26	13	+13	58.33
Total	152	81	34	37	256	154	+102	53.29

== Top goalscorers ==
Rank	Player	Tenure	Goals
1	(England) Alan Shearer	1996–2006	30
2	(Nigeria) Shola Ameobi	2000–2014	15
3	(Wales) Craig Bellamy	2001–2005	11
4	(Wales) Wyn Davies	1966–1971	10
4	(England) Anthony Gordon	2023–present	10
6	(Colombia) Faustino Asprilla	1996–1998	9
6	(England) Pop Robson	1962–1971	9
8	(Peru) Nolberto Solano	1998–2004; 2005–2007	7
9	(England) Harvey Barnes	2023–present	6
9	(Nigeria) Obafemi Martins	2006–2009	6
