= George Rutherford (businessman) =

English coal mine owner and FC chairman

George Rutherford (died 7 December 1949) was a coal mine owner and chairman of Newcastle United F.C. from 1936 to 1949.

== Career ==
Rutherford was a coal mine owner. He joined the board of Newcastle United F.C. in 1930 and was appointed chairman in 1936; it was Rutherford who invited Stan Seymour to join the board in 1938. Rutherford remained in the role of chairman for over a decade until his death in a nursing home in December 1949. Rutherford also served as a member of the Football League management committee from 1930 to 1949.
