= Darren Eales =

English sports executive

CEO of Newcastle United
- In office 15 July 2022 – 26 September 2025
- Leaders: Yasir Al-Rumayyan; Amanda Staveley (2022–2024); Jamie Reuben
- Preceded by: Amanda Staveley
- Succeeded by: David Hopkinson

Personal details
- Born: 6 August 1972 (age 54) Chelmsford, England
- Education: Brown University; University of Cambridge
Association football career
- Position: Forward
College career
Years	Team	Apps	(Gls)
1995–1996	Brown Bears		
Senior career*
Years	Team	Apps	(Gls)
1995–1996	Hampton Roads Mariners		
1997	Hershey Wildcats	5	(0)
- * Club domestic league appearances and goals

Darren Eales (born 6 August 1972) is an English sports executive who was Chief Executive Officer of the Premier League club Newcastle United from 2022 to 2024.

He was a footballer who played both collegiately and professionally in the United States. He was a 1995 first team All American and earned his Cambridge Blue in 1998. In July 2010, he was appointed director of football administration at Tottenham Hotspur. In 2014, he became Chief Executive Officer of Atlanta United in Major League Soccer.

== Early life ==
Eales grew up in Cambridge, England. As he approached the end of his secondary education, he was faced with the decision of attending university or pursuing a football career. When approached by an American university scout offering him the opportunity to both play and attend university, he decided to move to the United States.

== Education and college football ==
Eales attended Brown University, a member of the Ivy League, playing on the school's NCAA Division I soccer team from 1991 to 1994. In his final season, he was the Ivy League Player of the Year and a first team All American. He received a first class bachelor's degree in economics.

== Playing career ==
=== U.S. football ===
In 1995, Eales signed with the Hampton Roads Mariners of the USISL. He spent two seasons with the Mariners, scoring 24 goals in 19 games in 1995. In 1997, he played five games for the Hershey Wildcats.

=== English football ===
Eales continued to play at the amateur level. In 2001, he joined the Newmarket Town Reserves in the Kershaw League. He later moved to the Lancashire County Football Association where he played for Millhead Reserves from 2004 to 2006 and Higher Poynton from 2006 to 2007.

== Professional career ==
In 1997, Eales returned to England, where he read law at Cambridge, and gained his Cambridge Blue in 1998. He became a member of the bar in 2000 and eventually joined 2 Temple Gardens. On 6 May 2006, he was hired as an in-house legal counsel by West Brom. and was subsequently made a Director and Company Secretary.

On 2 March 2010, Spurs announced that Eales was joining them as club secretary at the end of that season. On 1 July 2010, he officially joined the club as Director of Football Administration.

On 10 September 2014, Eales was named the president of Atlanta United, a new expansion team in Major League Soccer.

On 15 July 2022, Eales became the CEO of Newcastle United.

On 27 September 2024, it was announced Eales was stepping down from his role as CEO of Newcastle United after being diagnosed with a chronic form of blood cancer.
