= Archie Gourlay =

Scottish footballer

Personal information
- Full name: Archibald Murdoch Gourlay
- Date of birth: 29 June 1969 (age 57)
- Place of birth: Scotland
- Positions: Midfielder; forward

Senior career*
Years	Team	Apps	(Gls)
-1988	Morton		
1988-1991	Newcastle United	3	(0)
	Motherwell	3	(0)
- Preston North End
- Hartlepool United
- * Club domestic league appearances and goals

Archibald Murdoch Gourlay (born 29 June 1969) is a Scottish retired footballer.

== Career ==
Gourlay started his career with Morton, where he was touted to have a successful career.

In 1988, Gourlay signed for Newcastle United in the English top flight. Despite earning Man of the Match in his second appearance, a 0-2 League Cup loss to Middlesbrough, he never established himself in the first team, only making 5 appearances for the club. After that, Gourlay returned to Scotland with Motherwell before playing for English lower league sides Preston North End as well as Hartlepool United, where he only made 1 appearance.
