= George Forbes (businessman) =

Scottish businessman (1944–2022)

George Robert Forbes (9 October 1944 – 12 October 2022) was a Scottish businessman who was the chairman of Newcastle United Football Club.

== Biography ==
Forbes grew up on the family farm in Berwickshire. He qualified as a livestock auctioneer and went from an employee at Wooler Auction Mart (in Northumberland) to the owner of the business and site, subsequently expanding it across the UK as County Auctions. Forbes eventually sold the livestock auction business to John Swan PLC in 1999.

In the 1980s, Forbes was invited to join the board of directors of Newcastle United F.C. as it aimed to appease fan discontent by appointing a number of local businessmen. Forbes was a Newcastle United supporter from his early years and attended games throughout the country from his late teens. He moved from director to vice-chairman and finally chairman at Newcastle in 1990. He chaired the club during the extremely difficult period when the Magpie Group led by Sir John Hall built up a large shareholding in the club and then took control in 1992.

Forbes was appointed chairman of British Cereal Exports (BCE) in 2006, a post he held until 2013.

Forbes continued to live at the family farm near Coldstream in Berwickshire. He died on 12 October 2022, at the age of 78.
