= David Robinson (footballer, born 1969) =

English footballer

Personal information
- Full name: David John Robinson
- Date of birth: 27 November 1969 (age 56)
- Place of birth: Newcastle, England
- Position: Striker

Youth career
- –1986: Wallsend Boys Club

Senior career*
Years	Team	Apps	(Gls)
1986–1992	Newcastle United	8	(1)
1991	→ Peterborough United (loan)	7	(3)
1992	Reading	8	(0)
1992–1994	Blackpool	26	(4)
1994–1995	Gateshead	19	(2)
1995	Bishop Auckland	?	(?)
1995–1996	Cambridge United	17	(1)
1996–1997	Berwick Rangers	4	(4)
1997–1998	Whitley Bay	?	(2)
Total		89	(16)
- * Club domestic league appearances and goals

David John Robinson (born 27 November 1969) is an English retired professional footballer.

A striker, Robinson began his career with his hometown club, Newcastle United, as an apprentice in 1986. In six years at St James' Park he made eight league and cup appearances, scoring against Reading in an FA cup replay.

After a loan spell with Peterborough United playing a vital role helping them to promotion in 1991, he joined Reading on a free transfer. He remained at Elm Park for just four months, after fellow Geordie Billy Ayre, then-manager at newly promoted Blackpool, came in for his services. He went on to make 26 league appearances for the Tangerines, scoring four goals.

Robinson returned to Tyneside in 1994 with Gateshead. After a year with the Heed, and a short spell with Bishop Auckland, he delved back into league football with Cambridge United.

In August 1996, two months after being released by Cambridge, Robinson joined Scottish club Berwick Rangers, where he brought his professional career to a close with four goals in as many games for the club.

His final club was Whitley Bay.
