= Bob Rutherford (clinician) =

Robert James Rutherford (died August 1995) was an eminent surgeon and chairman of Newcastle United F.C. from 1978 to 1981.

== Career ==
Rutherford was educated at the Royal Grammar School and Durham University where he studied medicine.

Rutherford became an eminent surgeon in Newcastle upon Tyne. He became a director of Newcastle United in April 1950 and became chairman when Lord Westwood stood down in January 1978.

In 1981, each director of Newcastle United were asked to put up a £16,000 guarantee in favour of the bank to help the club's financial position. Rutherford refused and resigned both as a director and as chairman. He lived in Gosforth and died in August 1995.
