= David Roche (footballer) =

English footballer

David Roche (born 13 December 1970) is an English former professional footballer who played for Newcastle United, Peterborough United, Doncaster Rovers and Southend United in the English football league in the 1990s. Roche played 41 times for Newcastle United, during which time he was loaned to Peterborough where he played 4 games. Then manager Kevin Keegan sold him to Doncaster Rovers for £85,000. In his midfield role he scored 8 goals in 53 appearances for Rovers before being sold to Southend in 1994 for £55,000 where he made just 4 substitute appearances before disappearing.
