= List of Newcastle United F.C. players =

Below is a list of notable footballers who have played for Newcastle United. Generally, this means players that have played 50–100 first-class matches for the club. However, some players who have played fewer matches are also included; this includes the club's founder members, players from the club's pre-Football League days, when they played fewer matches in a season than the present day, and some players who fell just short of the 100 total but made significant contributions to the club's history (e.g. Keegan, Ferdinand, Asprilla).

== List of players ==
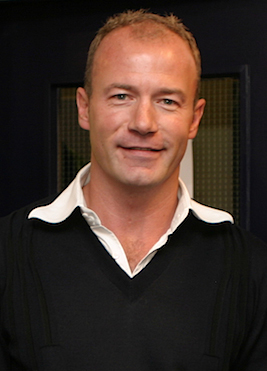
Alan Shearer is the club record goalscorer with 206 goals. In addition, he was the club's record signing from 1996 to 2005, and the club captain from 1998 to 2006.

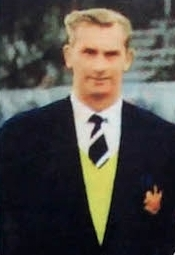
Jackie Milburn, pictured here in 1957 as Linfield player-manager, scored 200 goals for Newcastle, a record that stood unbroken until Shearer scored his 201st goal in a match against Portsmouth in 2006.

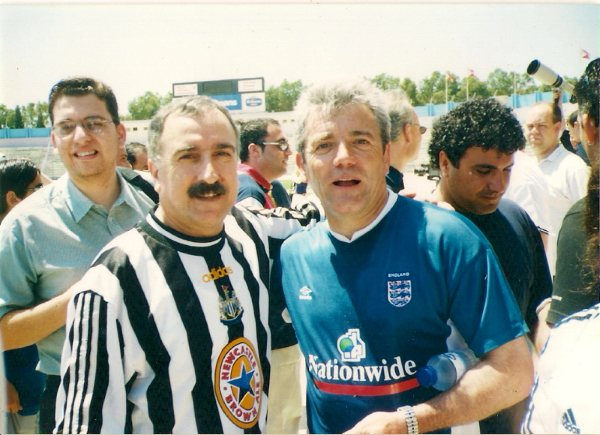
Kevin Keegan, pictured here with a Newcastle fan during his stint as England manager, played for and captained the club from 1982 to 1984.

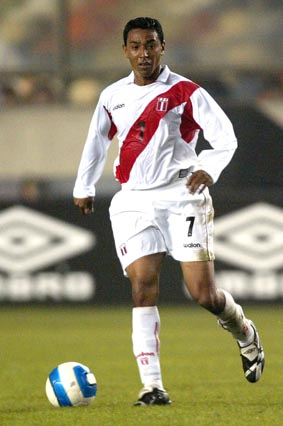
Nolberto Solano, pictured here playing for Peru, played for the club in two separate spells. The first was from 1998 to 2004, and the second was from 2005 to 2007. He is the first Peruvian to play in the Premier League and the FA Cup Final.

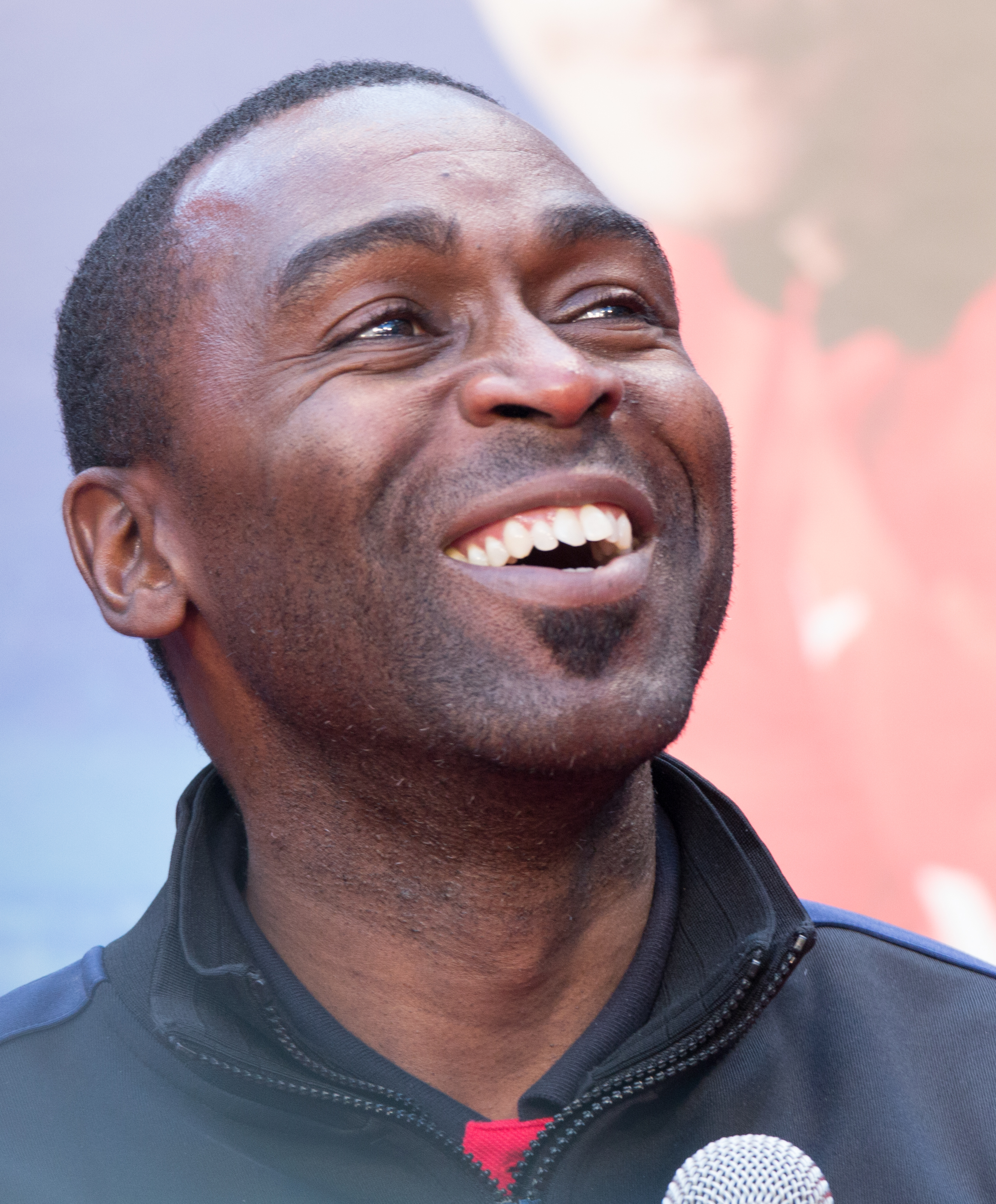
Andy Cole played for the club from 1993 to 1995, scoring 68 goals in 86 appearances. His departure to Manchester United, caused uproar amongst the Newcastle fans, leading to Keegan having to defend the sale on the steps of St James' Park.

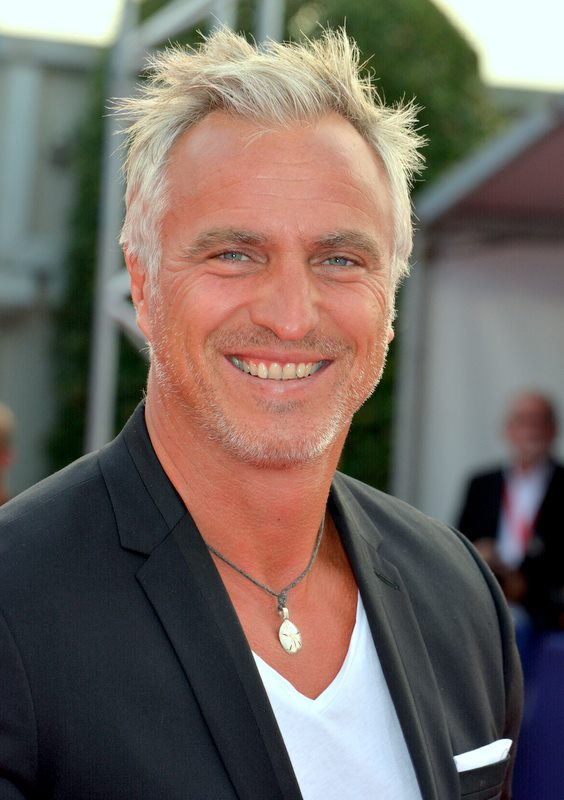
David Ginola played for the club from 1995 to 1997, quickly becoming an integral part of Newcastle's Entertainers side. Although a fan's favourite, he was not fancied by Keegan's replacement Kenny Dalglish, and left to join Tottenham Hotspur in 1997.

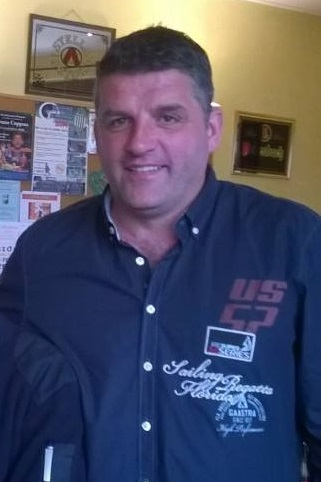
Phillippe Albert played for the club from 1994 to 1999, with a loan spell at Keegan's Fulham from 1998 to 1999. He is best remembered for scoring an audacious chip from 20 yards over Peter Schmeichel in a 5–0 win over Manchester United in 1996.

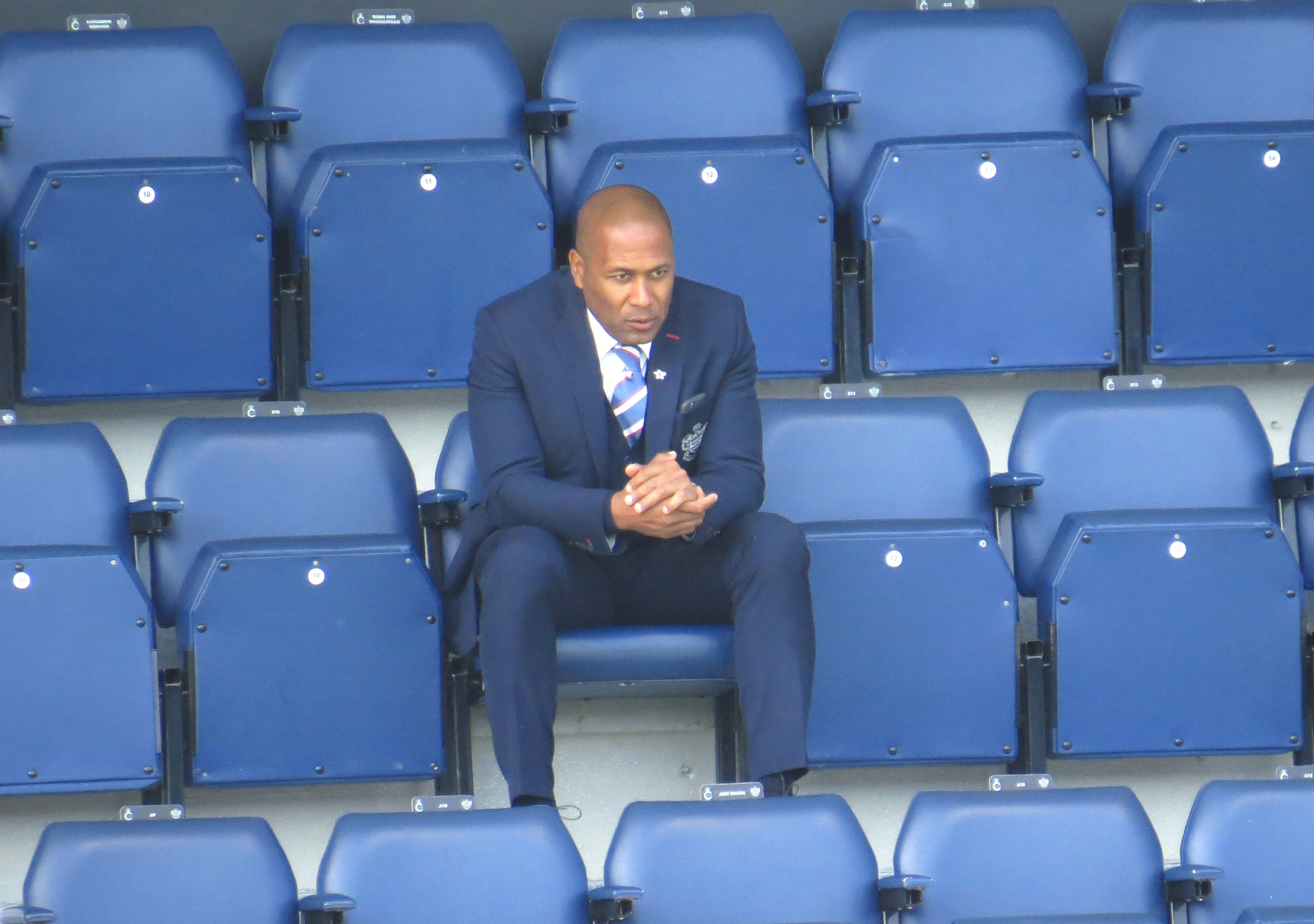
Les Ferdinand, pictured here as director of football at QPR, played for the club from 1995 to 1997, scoring 50 goals in 84 appearances. Nicknamed Sir Les, he had a short-lived but successful partnership with Shearer.

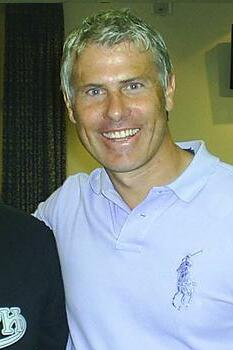
Rob Lee played for the club from 1992 to 2002. He was made club captain for the 1997–98 season by Dalglish, but was frozen out by the Scotsman's replacement, Ruud Gullit. Following Gullit's resignation after losing the Tyne–Wear derby, Bobby Robson took over and reinstated him into the side. He was awarded with a testimonial in 2001.

Players are listed according to the date they signed for the club. Appearances and goals are for first-team competitive matches only; wartime matches are excluded. Substitute appearances included.

Names in Bold are currently active at the club.

Player	Nationality	Position	Newcastle United career	Appearances	Goals	Reference
Andy Aitken	Scotland	HB	1895–1906	349	42	
Willie Wardrope	Scotland	FW	1895–1900	145	45	
Jack Carr	England	LB	1897–1912	278	5	
Tommy Ghee	Scotland	WF	1897-1902	144	2	
Matt Kingsley	England	GK	1898–1904	189	0	
Alex Gardner	Scotland	RW	1899–1910	314	26	
Colin Veitch	England	CB	1899–1914	322	49	
Ronald Orr	Scotland	FW	1901–1908	180	69	
Peter McWilliam	Scotland	HB	1902–1911	242	12	
Jock Rutherford	England	RW	1902–1913	334	92	
Bill Appleyard	England	FW	1903–1908	145	88	
James Howie	Scotland	FW	1903–1910	237	83	
Albert Gosnell	England	LW	1904–1909	106	15	
Jimmy Lawrence	Scotland	GK	1904–1921	496	0	
Andy McCombie	Scotland	FB	1904–1910	132	0	
Bill McCracken	Ireland	HB	1904–1924	432	8	
Tony Whitson	South Africa	DF	1906–1914	146	0	
George Wilson	Scotland	LW	1907–1915	218	33	
Albert Shepherd	England	FW	1908–1914	123	92	
Jimmy Stewart	England	FW	1908–1913	138	51	
Jock Finlay	Scotland	HB	1909–1924	161	8	
Wilf Low	Scotland	CB	1909–1924	367	8	
Frank Hudspeth	England	CB	1910–1929	472	37	
William Bradley	England	GK	1914–1927	143	0	
Billy Aitken	England	FW	1920–1924	110	10	
Neil Harris	Scotland	FW	1920–1925	194	101	
Stan Seymour	England	LW	1920–1929	266	84	
Tommy McDonald	Scotland	IF	1921–1931	367	113	
Charlie Spencer	England	DF	1921–1928	175	1	
Alf Maitland	Scotland	FB	1924–1930	163	0	
Willie Wilson	Scotland	GK	1925–1929	134	0	
Jimmy Boyd	Scotland	RW	1925–1935	214	57	
Joe Harris	Scotland	HB	1925–1931	157	2	
Hughie Gallacher	Scotland	FW	1925–1930	174	143	
Mick Burns	England	GK	1927–1935	108	0	
David Fairhurst	England	FB	1929–1939	285	2	
Jack Allen	England	FW	1931–1934	90	41	
Billy Cairns	England	FW	1933–1944	90	53	
Tommy Pearson	Scotland	LW	1933–1948	212	46	
Norman Tapken	England	GK	1934–1938	113	0	
Willie Imrie	Scotland	RW	1934–1938	128	24	
Bobby Ancell	Scotland	LB	1936–1944	102	1	
Jackie Milburn	England	FW	1943–1957	397	200	
Ron Batty	England	LB	1945–1958	184	1	
Joe Harvey	England	HB	1945–1953	247	12	
Frank Brennan	Scotland	DF	1946–1956	349	3	
Bobby Cowell	England	RB	1946–1955	289	0	
Charlie Crowe	England	LF	1946–1957	178	5	
Tommy Walker	England	RW	1946–1954	184	35	
Jack Fairbrother	England	GK	1947–1952	161	0	
Ernie Taylor	England	IF	1947–1951	107	19	
George Hannah	England	FW	1949–1957	175	43	
Alf McMichael	Northern Ireland	LB	1949–1962	433	1	
Bobby Mitchell	Scotland	FW	1949–1961	412	113	
George Robledo	Chile	FW	1949–1953	166	91	
Ted Robledo	Chile	LB	1949–1953	47	0	
Bob Stokoe	England	CB	1950–1961	261	4	
Ivor Broadis	England	FW	1951–1955	51	18	
Reg Davies	Wales	FW	1951–1958	171	50	
Ronnie Simpson	Scotland	GK	1951–1960	295	0	
Tommy Casey	Northern Ireland	HB	1952–1958	116	8	
Vic Keeble	England	FW	1952–1957	121	69	
Jimmy Scoular	Scotland	RW	1953–1961	273	6	
Len White	England	RW/FW	1953–1962	269	153	
Jackie Bell	England	RB	1956–1962	117	8	
George Eastham	England	FW	1956–1960	129	34	
Gordon Hughes	England	FW	1956–1963	133	18	
Dick Keith	Northern Ireland	RB	1956–1964	223	4	
Ivor Allchurch	Wales	IF	1958–1962	154	51	
Dave Hollins	Wales	GK	1960–1966	112	0	
John McGrath	England	CB	1960–1967	179	2	
Bert McIntosh	Scotland	MF	1920–1924	103	2	
Harry McMenemy	Scotland	FW	1931–1937	149	37	
Frank Clark	England	LB	1962–1975	464	2	
David Craig	Northern Ireland	RB	1962–1978	412	12	
Dave Hilley	Scotland	IF	1962–1968	194	31	
Jim Iley	England	RB	1962–1969	249	16	
Ron McGarry	England	FW	1962–1967	132	46	
Bobby Moncur	Scotland	CB	1962–1974	356	8	
Pop Robson	England	FW	1962–1971	244	97	
Alan Suddick	England	FW	1962–1967	144	41	
Ollie Burton	Wales	CD	1963–1972	188	6	
Gordon Marshall	England	GK	1963–1968	187	0	
Wyn Davies	Wales	FW	1966–1971	216	53	
Dave Elliott	England	MF	1966–1971	90	4	
Willie McFaul	Northern Ireland	GK	1966–1975	290	0	
John McNamee	Scotland	CB	1966–1971	117	8	
Alan Foggon	England	FW	1967–1971	61	14	
Tommy Gibb	Scotland	MF	1968–1975	199	12	
Jimmy Smith	Scotland	MF	1969–1975	167	13	
Stewart Barrowclough	England	RW	1970–1978	274	24	
Tommy Cassidy	Northern Ireland	MF	1970–1980	180	22	
Irving Nattrass	England	RB/CB/DM	1970–1979	304	20	
John Tudor	England	FW	1970–1977	164	53	
Terry Hibbitt	England	LW	1971–1975; 1978–1981	262	14	
Pat Howard	England	CD	1971–1977	184	7	
Malcolm Macdonald	England	FW	1971–1976	228	121	
Alan Kennedy	England	LB	1972–1978	158	9	
Terry McDermott	England	MF	1973–1974; 1982–1984	160	24	
Micky Burns	England	RW/FW	1974–1978	184	48	
Tommy Craig	Scotland	LM	1974–1978	124	22	
Geoff Nulty	England	MF	1974–1978	101	11	
David Barton	England	CB	1975–1983	110	6	
Alan Gowling	England	FW	1975–1978	92	30	
Mike Mahoney	England	GK	1975–1979	108	0	
Kevin Carr	England	GK	1976–1985	195	0	
Steve Hardwick	England	GK	1976–1983	101	0	
Mark McGhee	Scotland	FW	1977–1978; 1989–1991	112	36	
John Brownlie	Scotland	RB	1978–1982	136	3	
Mick Martin	Republic of Ireland	CM	1978–1983	163	6	
Alan Shoulder	England	FW	1978–1982	117	38	
Kenny Wharton	England	LM/LB	1978–1989	290	26	
Peter Withe	England	FW	1978–1980	83	27	
Steve Carney	England	CB	1979–1985	149	1	
Chris Waddle	England	LW	1980–1985	191	52	
John Anderson	Republic of Ireland	RB/CB	1982–1991	333	15	
Jeff Clarke	England	CD	1982–1987	124	4	
Kevin Keegan	England	FW	1982–1984	85	49	
David McCreery	Northern Ireland	DM	1982–1989	243	2	
Peter Beardsley	England	AM/FW	1983–1987; 1993–1997	324	119	
Neil McDonald	England	RB/MF	1983–1988	207	29	
Glenn Roeder	England	CB	1983–1988	216	10	
Martin Thomas	Wales	GK	1983–1988	118	0	
Paul Gascoigne	England	MF	1984–1988	107	25	
Kevin Scott	England	CB	1986–1994	227	8	
Kevin Brock	England	RM	1988–1993	145	14	
Liam O'Brien	Republic of Ireland	MF	1988–1994	151	19	
Steve Howey	England	MF/CB	1989–2000	238	7	
Micky Quinn	England	ST	1989–1992	110	77	
Lee Clark	England	MF	1990–1997; 2005–2006	257	27	
Gavin Peacock	England	AM/FW	1990–1993	119	42	
Robbie Elliott	England	LB/LM	1991–1997; 2001–2006	188	11	
David Kelly	Republic of Ireland	FW	1991–1993	70	35	
Pavel Srníček	Czech Republic	GK	1991–1998; 2006–2007	185	0	
Steve Watson	England	RB/RM/FW	1991–1998	263	14	
John Beresford	England	LB	1992–1998	229	8	
Rob Lee	England	RM/CM/AM	1992–2002	381	56	
Barry Venison	England	FB	1992–1995	109	1	
Philippe Albert	Belgium	CB	1993–1999	135	12	
Andy Cole	England	FW	1993–1995	85	68	
Steve Harper	England	GK	1993–2013	157	0	
Darren Peacock	England	CB	1994–1998	178	4	
Warren Barton	England	RB	1995–2002	220	5	
Les Ferdinand	England	FW	1995–1997	84	50	
Keith Gillespie	Northern Ireland	RW	1995–1998	146	14	
Shaka Hislop	Trinidad and Tobago	GK	1995-1998	71	0	
David Ginola	France	LW	1995–1997	75	7	
Faustino Asprilla	Colombia	FW	1996–1998	48	12	
David Batty	England	MF	1996–1998	113	4	
Aaron Hughes	Northern Ireland	RB/CB	1996–2005	278	7	
Alan Shearer	England	ST	1996–2006	405	206	
Shay Given	Republic of Ireland	GK	1997–2009	462	0	
Temuri Ketsbaia	Georgia	MF	1997–2000	109	14	
Nikos Dabizas	Greece	CB	1998–2003	176	13	
Andy Griffin	England	RB/LB	1998–2004	104	3	
Nolberto Solano	Peru	RW	1998–2004; 2005–2007	314	48	
Gary Speed	Wales	MF	1998–2004	284	40	
Kieron Dyer	England	MF	1999–2007	250	36	
Shola Ameobi	Nigeria	FW	2000–2014	397	79	
Olivier Bernard	France	LB	2000–2005; 2006–2007	145	6	
Craig Bellamy	Wales	FW	2001–2005	128	42	
Andy O'Brien	Republic of Ireland	CB	2001–2005	162	7	
Laurent Robert	France	LW	2001–2005	181	32	
Titus Bramble	England	CB	2002–2007	157	7	
Jermaine Jenas	England	MF	2002–2005	152	12	
Steven Taylor	England	CB	2003–2016	258	15	
Lee Bowyer	England	MF	2003-2006	98	11	
Nicky Butt	England	MF	2004–2010	173	5	
Stephen Carr	Republic of Ireland	RB	2004–2008	107	1	
James Milner	England	MF	2004–2008	139	12	
Charles N'Zogbia	France	MF	2004–2009	157	9	
Scott Parker	England	MF	2005–2007	73	6	
Emre Belözoğlu	Turkey	MF	2005-2008	80	6	
Tim Krul	Netherlands	GK	2006–2017	185	0	
Obafemi Martins	Nigeria	FW	2006–2009	104	35	
Damien Duff	Republic of Ireland	MF	2006-2009	86	6	
Andy Carroll	England	FW	2006–2011; 2019–2021	134	34	
Geremi	Cameroon	MF	2007–2009	54	3	
Caçapa	Brazil	CB	2007–2009	29	2	
Joey Barton	England	MF	2007–2011	84	8	
José Enrique	Spain	LB	2007–2011	129	1	
Danny Guthrie	England	MF	2008–2012	104	9	
Fabricio Coloccini	Argentina	CB	2008–2016	263	7	
Jonás Gutiérrez	Argentina	MF/LB	2008–2015	205	12	
Peter Løvenkrands	Denmark	FW	2009–2012	85	29	
Nile Ranger	England	FW	2009–2013	62	3	
Kevin Nolan	England	MF	2009–2011	91	30	
Ryan Taylor	England	RB/RW/CM	2009–2015	110	10	
Danny Simpson	England	RB	2009–2013	137	2	
Paul Dummett	Wales	CB/LB	2010–2024	213	4	
James Perch	England	RB	2010–2013	85	1	
Hatem Ben Arfa	France	FW	2010–2015	86	14	
Mike Williamson	England	CB	2010–2016	168	1	
Cheick Tioté	Ivory Coast	MF	2010–2017	141	1	
Rob Elliot	Republic of Ireland	GK	2011–2021	68	0	
Demba Ba	France	FW	2011–2013	58	29	
Yohan Cabaye	France	MF	2011-2014	93	18	
Papiss Cissé	Senegal	FW	2012–2016	151	44	
Vurnon Anita	Curaçao	MF	2012–2017	155	3	
Yoan Gouffran	France	FW/LW	2013–2017	127	19	
Moussa Sissoko	France	MF	2013–2016	133	12	
Ayoze Perez	Spain	FW	2014–2019	179	42	
Jack Colback	England	MF	2014–2020	102	5	
Karl Darlow	Wales	GK	2014–2023	101	0	
Jamaal Lascelles	England	CB	2014–2026	251	15	
Georginio Wijnaldum	Netherlands	MF	2015–2016	40	11	
Aleksandar Mitrović	Serbia	FW	2015–2018	72	17	
Dwight Gayle	England	FW	2016–2022	122	34	
Matt Ritchie	Scotland	MF/LWB	2016–2024	213	24	
Isaac Hayden	Jamaica	MF	2016–2025	169	7	
Ciaran Clark	Republic of Ireland	CB	2016–2023	129	11	
Mohamed Diame	Senegal	MF	2016–2019	103	7	
DeAndre Yedlin	United States	RB	2016–2021	125	5	
Jonjo Shelvey	England	MF	2016–2023	202	17	
Christian Atsu	Ghana	MF	2016–2021	122	8	
Sean Longstaff	England	MF	2016–2025	211	16	
Javier Manquillo	Spain	RB	2017–2024	110	1	
**Jacob Murphy**	England	LW/RW	2017–present	263	25	
Martin Dubravka	Slovakia	GK	2018–2025	179	0	
**Fabian Schar**	Switzerland	CB	2018–present	251	22	
Federico Fernández	Argentina	CB	2018–2022	89	2	
Miguel Almiron	Paraguay	FW	2019–2025	223	30	
Allan Saint-Maximin	France	FW/LW/RW	2019–2023	124	13	
**Joelinton**	Brazil	FW/MF	2019–present	263	35	
Emil Krafth	Sweden	RB	2019–2026	105	1	
Callum Wilson	England	FW	2020–2025	130	49	
**Joe Willock**	England	MF	2021–present	181	18	
Kieran Trippier	England	RB	2022–2026	160	4	
Bruno Guimarães	Brazil	MF	2022–2026	194	20	
**Dan Burn**	England	CB/LB	2022–present	192	9	
**Nick Pope**	England	GK	2022–present	130	0	
Alexander Isak	Sweden	FW	2022–2025	109	58	
**Sven Botman**	Netherlands	CB	2022–present	113	4	
Anthony Gordon	England	FW	2023–2026	152	32	
**Harvey Barnes**	England	FW	2023–present	119	26	
Sandro Tonali	Italy	MF	2023–2026	110	10	
**Tino Livramento**	England	RB	2023–present	106	1	
**Lewis Hall**	England	LB	2023–present	101	3	

== Club captains ==
Player	Period
(Scotland) Bobby Moncur	1968–1974
(England) Irving Nattrass	1974–1975
(England) Geoff Nulty	1975–1978
(England) Terry Hibbitt	1978–1979
(Republic of Ireland) Mick Martin	1979–1982
(England) Kevin Keegan	1982–1984
(England) Glenn Roeder	1984–1988
(England) Andy Thorn	1988–1990
(Scotland) Roy Aitken	1990–1991
(England) Kevin Scott	1991–1992
(England) Brian Kilcline	1992–1993
(England) Barry Venison	1993–1994
(England) Peter Beardsley	1994–1997
(England) Rob Lee	1997–1998
(England) Alan Shearer	1998–2006
(England) Scott Parker	2006–2007
(Cameroon) Geremi	2007–2008
(England) Michael Owen	2008–2009
(England) Nicky Butt	2009–2010
(England) Kevin Nolan	2010–2011
(Argentina) Fabricio Coloccini	2011–2016
(England) Jamaal Lascelles	2016–2024
(Brazil) Bruno Guimarães	2024–2026
(England) Dan Burn	2026–present

== Hall of Fame ==
Player	Newcastle United career
(Nigeria) Shola Ameobi	2000–2014
(England) Peter Beardsley	1983–1987; 1993–1997
(England) John Beresford	1992–1998
(Scotland) Frank Brennan	1946–1956
(England) Frank Clark	1962–1975
(England) Andy Cole	1993–1995
(Northern Ireland) David Craig	1966–1978
(England) Les Ferdinand	1995–1997
(Scotland) Hughie Gallacher	1925–1930
(Republic of Ireland) Shay Given	1997–2009
(England) Steve Harper	1993–2013
(England) Joe Harvey	1945–1953
(England) Kevin Keegan	1982–1984
(Scotland) Jimmy Lawrence	1904–1922
(England) Rob Lee	1992–2002
(England) Malcolm Macdonald	1971–1976
(Republic of Ireland) Mick Martin	1978–1984
(Ireland) Bill McCracken	1904–1924
(England) Terry McDermott	1973–1974; 1982–1984
(England) Jackie Milburn	1943–1957
(Scotland) Bobby Mitchell	1949–1961
(Scotland) Bobby Moncur	1962–1974
(England) Jock Rutherford	1902–1913
(England) Stan Seymour	1920–1929
(Peru) Nolberto Solano	1998–2004; 2005–2007
(England) Alan Shearer	1996–2006
(Wales) Gary Speed	1998–2004
(Czech Republic) Pavel Srníček	1991–1998; 2006–2007
(England) Colin Veitch	1899–1914
