= Phil Bonnyman =

Scottish footballer (born 1954)

Personal information
- Full name: Phillip Bonnyman
- Date of birth: 6 February 1954 (age 72)
- Place of birth: Glasgow, Scotland
- Height: 5 ft 11 in (1.80 m)
- Position: Midfielder

Youth career
- Anniesland Waverley

Senior career*
Years	Team	Apps	(Gls)
1971–1973	Rangers	0	(0)
1973–1975	Hamilton Academical	71	(7)
1975–1980	Carlisle United	152	(26)
1980–1982	Chesterfield	99	(25)
1982–1987	Grimsby Town	151	(15)
1985–1986	→ Stoke City (loan)	7	(0)
1987–1988	Darlington	50	(5)
1989–1990	Dunfermline Athletic	1	(0)
Total		531	(78)

Managerial career
- 1997–1998: Huntly
- 1999–2000: Huntly
- * Club domestic league appearances and goals

Phillip Bonnyman (born 6 February 1954) is a Scottish former professional footballer who played as a midfielder for Anniesland Waverley, Rangers, Hamilton Academical, Carlisle United, Chesterfield, Grimsby Town, Stoke City, Darlington and Dunfermline Athletic. He won the Anglo-Scottish Cup with Chesterfield in 1981. During his time in England, he scored 84 goals in 543 league and cup appearances. He later coached at Dunfermline Athletic, Hamilton Academical and Port Vale, and had two spells as manager at Highland League side Huntly.

== Playing career ==
Born in Glasgow, Bonnyman played for Anniesland Waverley, before being signed to Rangers by Jock Wallace. He made one appearance for "Gers", making his debut at the age of 18 against Stenhousemuir at Ibrox Stadium in a League Cup second leg match on 4 October 1972; Rangers lost the game 2–1 but won the tie 6–2 on aggregate. He went on to play for Hamilton Academical, before joining Carlisle United in March 1976. In his first full season at Carlisle he side suffered relegation to the Third Division. He spent five seasons at Brunton Park making 176 appearances scoring 33 goals before moving to Third Division rivals Chesterfield in March 1980 after being signed on transfer deadline day by manager Arthur Cox. He became a popular player at Saltergate for his performances for the club. He spent three seasons there making 124 appearances scoring 29 goals. He helped the club to win the Anglo-Scottish Cup in its final year, 1981, with a 2–1 victory over Notts County. Chesterfield's financial problems saw him move on to Second Division Grimsby Town in August 1982.

At Grimsby, Bonnyman became a regular under Dave Booth until he resigned in October 1985. Bonnyman then went out on loan to Stoke City where he played seven matches in 1985–86. He returned to Grimsby where he played one more season before linking up with Dave Booth at Darlington. After two seasons a Darlington he left to become player/coach at Dunfermline Athletic.

== Style of play ==
Bonnyman was a midfielder with excellent heading and close control skills who could shoot with both feet, though lacking in pace and poor at tackling.

== Coaching career ==
Bonnyman then became assistant manager of Dunfermline and later Hamilton Academical before becoming community manager of Hamilton. He became manager of Highland League side Huntly in November 1997, guiding them to the title in 1997–98. Shortly after this success, he left to become assistant manager to John Rudge at Port Vale. However, chairman Bill Bell forced Rudge to sack Bonnyman. He made a return to Huntly as they narrowly missed out winning the title in 1998–99 finishing four points behind Peterhead. After a poor 1999–2000 season, both Bonnyman and chairman Mike Hendry left Huntly. Bonnyman then became assistant manager at Forfar Athletic in December 2000 and later attended university and worked as a mortgage adviser.

== Career statistics ==
Appearances and goals by club, season and competition
Club	Season	League			National cup (Note: Includes FA Cup, Scottish Cup)		League cup (Note: Includes Football League Cup, Scottish League Cup)		Other (Note: Included Anglo-Scottish Cup, Football League Group Cup, Football League Trophy and Full Members Cup)		Total	
Club	Season	Division	Apps	Goals	Apps	Goals	Apps	Goals	Apps	Goals	Apps	Goals
Rangers	1972–73	Scottish Division One	0	0	0	0	1	0	0	0	1	0
Carlisle United	1975–76	Second Division	9	0	0	0	0	0	0	0	9	0
Carlisle United	1976–77	Second Division	37	1	2	1	4	1	0	0	43	3
Carlisle United	1977–78	Third Division	33	8	4	0	2	0	0	0	43	8
Carlisle United	1978–79	Third Division	45	7	3	0	2	1	0	0	50	8
Carlisle United	1979–80	Third Division	28	10	5	4	2	0	0	0	35	14
Carlisle United	Total		152	26	14	5	10	2	0	0	176	33
Chesterfield	1979–80	Third Division	11	3	0	0	0	0	0	0	11	3
Chesterfield	1980–81	Third Division	42	8	6	0	4	1	8	1	60	10
Chesterfield	1981–82	Third Division	46	14	2	2	2	0	3	0	53	16
Chesterfield	Total		99	25	8	2	6	1	11	1	124	29
Grimsby Town	1982–83	Second Division	40	1	2	0	3	0	3	0	48	1
Grimsby Town	1983–84	Second Division	29	3	1	0	2	0	0	0	32	3
Grimsby Town	1984–85	Second Division	37	8	3	0	5	1	0	0	45	9
Grimsby Town	1985–86	Second Division	29	3	0	0	2	0	1	1	32	4
Grimsby Town	1986–87	Second Division	16	0	3	0	0	0	1	0	20	0
Grimsby Town	Total		151	15	9	0	12	1	5	1	177	17
Stoke City (loan)	1985–86	Second Division	7	0	0	0	0	0	0	0	7	0
Darlington	1987–88	Fourth Division	38	3	0	0	3	0	4	0	45	3
Darlington	1988–89	Fourth Division	12	2	0	0	0	0	0	0	12	2
Darlington	Total		50	5	0	0	3	0	4	0	57	5
Career total			459	71	31	7	32	4	20	2	542	84

== Honours ==
Chesterfield

- Anglo-Scottish Cup: 1981
