= 1969 Inter-Cities Fairs Cup final =

- Event: 1968–69 Inter-Cities Fairs Cup
Newcastle United	Újpesti Dózsa
(England)	(Hungary)
6	2
- on aggregate

First leg
Newcastle United	Újpesti Dózsa
3	0
- Date: 29 May 1969
- Venue: St James' Park, Newcastle upon Tyne
- Referee: Joseph Hannet (Belgium)
- Attendance: 60,000

Second leg
Újpesti Dózsa	Newcastle United
2	3
- Date: 11 June 1969
- Venue: Megyeri úti Stadium, Budapest
- Referee: Joseph Heymann (Switzerland)
- Attendance: 37,000

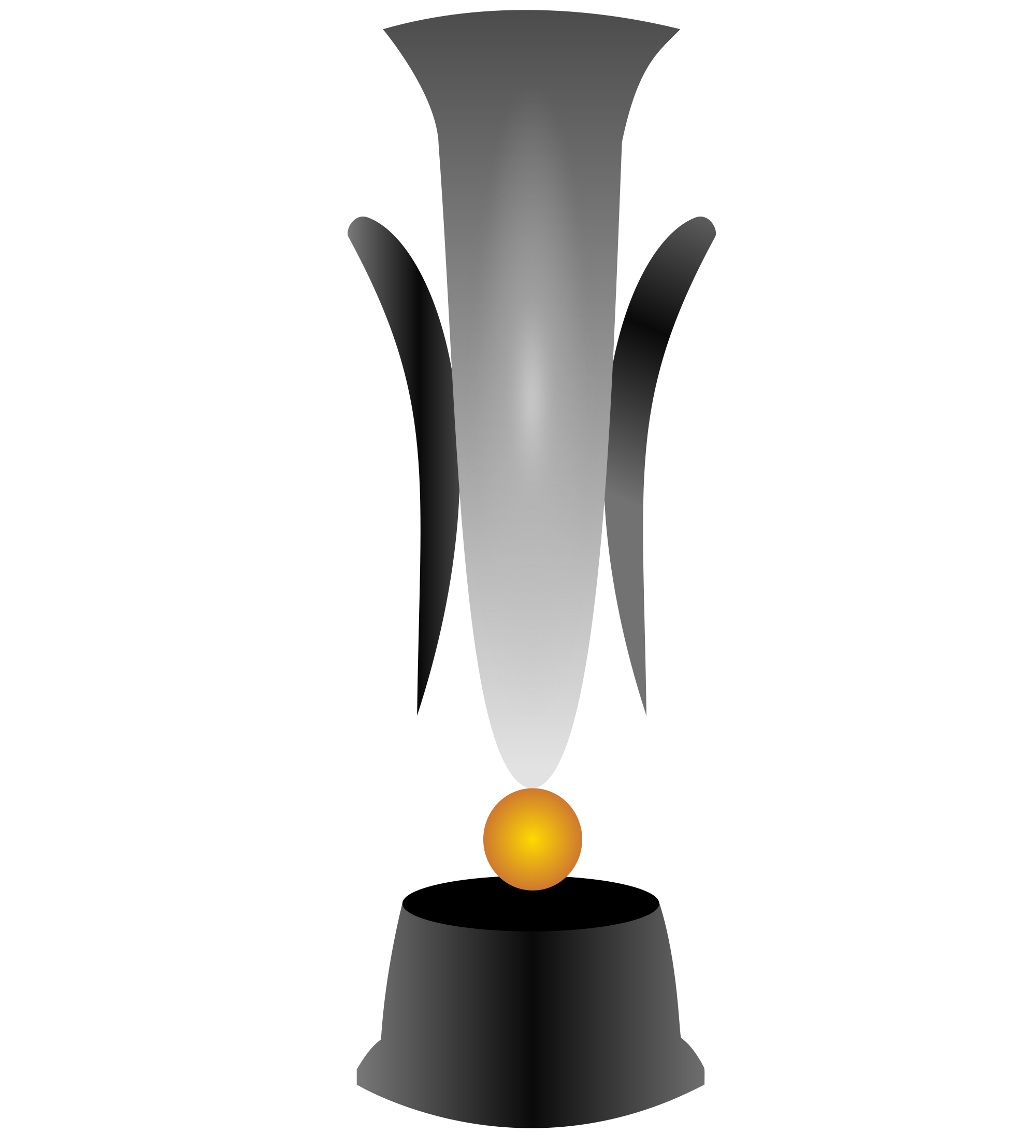
Inter-Cities Fairs Cup Trophy

The 1969 Inter-Cities Fairs Cup final was the final of the eleventh Inter-Cities Fairs Cup. It was played on 29 May and 11 June 1969 between Newcastle United of England and Újpesti Dózsa of Hungary. Newcastle won the tie 6–2 on aggregate.

This was the last major trophy Newcastle won for 56 years until the 2025 EFL Cup final.

== Route to the final ==
Newcastle United				Round	Újpesti Dózsa			
Opponent	Agg.	1st leg	2nd leg		Opponent	Agg.	1st leg	2nd leg
(Netherlands) Feijenoord (Note: Though the club was invariably referred to as either Feijenoord (the original Dutch spelling) or Feyenoord (the Anglicanised/international spelling) in the years prior, it would not be until 1974 that the club officially changed its name to Feyenoord.)	4–2	4–0 (H)	0–2 (A)	First round	Union Luxembourg	w/o		
(Portugal) Sporting CP	2–1	1–1 (A)	1–0 (H)	Second round	(Greece) Aris	11–2	2–1 (A)	9–1 (H)
(Spain) Zaragoza	4–4 (a)	2–3 (A)	2–1 (H)	Third round	(Poland) Legia Warzawa	3–2	1–0 (A)	2–2 (H)
(Portugal) Vitória de Setúbal	6–4	5–1 (H)	1–3 (A)	Quarter-finals	(England) Leeds United	3–0	1–0 (A)	2–0 (H)
(Scotland) Rangers	2–0	0–0 (A)	2–0 (H)	Semi-finals	(Turkey) Göztepe	8–1	4–1 (A)	4–0 (H)

== Match details ==
=== First leg ===
29 May 1969

Newcastle United (England)	3–0	(Hungary) Újpesti Dózsa
Moncur 63' 72'; Scott 83'

St James' Park, Newcastle upon Tyne
Attendance: 60,000

Newcastle

Újpesti Dózsa

- (Northern Ireland) Willie McFaul (gk)
- (Northern Ireland) David Craig
- (England) Frank Clark
- (Scotland) Tommy Gibb
- (Wales) Ollie Burton
- (Scotland) Bobby Moncur
- (Scotland) Jim Scott
- (England) Pop Robson
- (Wales) Wyn Davies
- (Denmark) Preben Arentoft
- (Scotland) Jackie Sinclair (sub 75')

Substitutes:

- (England) Alan Foggon (on 75')

Coach: (England) Joe Harvey

- (Hungary) Antal Szentmihályi (gk)
- (Hungary) Benő Káposzta
- (Hungary) Ernő Solymosi
- (Hungary) István Bánkuti
- (Hungary) Ernő Noskó
- (Hungary) Ede Dunai
- (Hungary) László Fazekas
- (Hungary) János Göröcs
- (Hungary) Ferenc Bene
- (Hungary) Antal Dunai
- (Hungary) Sándor Zámbó

Substitutes:

Coach: (Hungary) Lajos Baróti

=== Second leg ===
11 June 1969

Újpesti Dózsa (Hungary)	2–3	(England) Newcastle United
Bene 31'; Göröcs 44'		Moncur 46'; Arentoft 50'; Foggon 74'

Megyeri úti Stadium, Budapest
Attendance: 37,000

Újpesti Dózsa

Newcastle

- (Hungary) Antal Szentmihályi (gk)
- (Hungary) Benő Káposzta
- (Hungary) Ernő Solymosi
- (Hungary) István Bánkuti
- (Hungary) Ernő Noskó
- (Hungary) Ede Dunai
- (Hungary) László Fazekas
- (Hungary) János Göröcs
- (Hungary) Ferenc Bene
- (Hungary) Antal Dunai
- (Hungary) Sándor Zámbó

Substitutions:

Coach: (Hungary) Lajos Baróti

- (Northern Ireland) Willie McFaul (gk)
- (Northern Ireland) David Craig
- (England) Frank Clark
- (Scotland) Tommy Gibb
- (Wales) Ollie Burton
- (Scotland) Bobby Moncur
- (Scotland) Jim Scott (sub 73')
- (Denmark) Preben Arentoft
- (England) Pop Robson
- (Wales) Wyn Davies
- (Scotland) Jackie Sinclair

Substitutions

- (England) Alan Foggon (on 73')

Coach: (England) Joe Harvey

Newcastle United win 6–2 on aggregate

== See also ==
- 1968–69 Inter-Cities Fairs Cup
- Newcastle United F.C. in European football
- Újpest FC in European football
