= 1973 Anglo-Italian Cup =

The 1973 Anglo-Italian Cup was the fourth Anglo-Italian Cup competition. The European football competition was played between eight clubs from England and eight clubs from Italy and was the last professional Anglo-Italian Cup until it was re-incarnated in 1992.

== Format ==
For the competition, there were eight English teams and eight Italian teams. These teams were split into two groups consisting of four English and four Italian teams each. Each team played against the four teams in their group from the opposing nation. In each group, the best team from each nation progressed to the semi-finals. The semi-finals were two-leg matches played between each nation's group winners. The winner of each nation's semi-final then met in a final. Two points were awarded for a win and one point for a draw but, unlike the previous tournaments, points were no longer awarded for each goal scored. The draw for the group matches took place in Milan on 7 February 1973.

== Group stage ==
| Group | England | Italy |
|---|---|---|
| 1 | Crystal Palace; Hull City; Luton Town; Manchester United | Bari; Fiorentina; Lazio; Verona |
| 2 | Newcastle United; Blackpool; Oxford United; Fulham | Bologna; Como; Roma; Torino |

=== Group 1 games ===
14 February 1973

| Crystal Palace | 4 – 1 | Verona |
|---|---|---|
| M. Hinshelwood; Bell; Whittle | (ref) |

| Hull City | 2 – 1 | Lazio |

| Manchester United | 1 – 1 | Fiorentina |

| Luton Town | 4 – 0 | Bari |

| Verona | 2 – 1 | Luton Town |

21 March 1973

| Bari | 0 – 1 | Crystal Palace |
|---|---|---|
| | (ref) | Possee |

| Lazio | 0 – 0 | Manchester United |

| Fiorentina | 1 – 0 | Hull City |

4 April 1973

| Hull City | 2 – 1 | Verona |

4 April 1973

| Manchester United | 3 – 1 | Bari |

4 April 1973

| Crystal Palace | 3 – 1 | Lazio |
|---|---|---|
| Craven | (ref) |

4 April 1973

| Luton Town | 1 – 0 | Fiorentina |

| Verona | 1 – 4 | Manchester United |

| Bari | 0 – 0 | Hull City |

| Luton Town | 2 – 2 | Lazio |

2 May 1973

| Fiorentina | 2 – 2 | Crystal Palace |
|---|---|---|
| | (ref) | Possee |

==== Group 1 tables ====
Italian teams

| Team | Pld | W | D | L | GF | GA | Pts (Note: Two points were awarded for a win, one point for a draw.) |
|---|---|---|---|---|---|---|---|
| Fiorentina | 4 | 1 | 2 | 1 | 4 | 4 | 4 |
| Lazio | 4 | 0 | 2 | 2 | 4 | 7 | 2 |
| Verona | 4 | 1 | 0 | 3 | 5 | 11 | 2 |
| Bari | 4 | 0 | 1 | 3 | 1 | 8 | 1 |

English teams

| Team | Pld | W | D | L | GF | GA | Pts |
|---|---|---|---|---|---|---|---|
| Crystal Palace | 4 | 3 | 1 | 0 | 10 | 4 | 7 |
| Manchester United | 4 | 2 | 2 | 0 | 8 | 3 | 6 |
| Luton Town | 4 | 2 | 1 | 1 | 8 | 4 | 5 |
| Hull City | 4 | 2 | 1 | 1 | 4 | 3 | 5 |

=== Group 2 games ===
| Como | 0 – 0 | Fulham |

| Bologna | 0 – 0 | Oxford United |

| Roma | 0 – 2 | Newcastle United |
|---|---|---|
| | | Tudor |

| Torino | 0 – 1 | Blackpool |

| Blackpool | 3 – 0 | Como |

21 March 1973

| Newcastle United | 1 – 0 | Bologna |
|---|---|---|
| Gibb |

| Fulham | 1 – 1 | Roma |

| Oxford United | 1 – 1 | Torino |

4 April 1973

| Como | 0 – 2 | Newcastle United |

4 April 1973

| Bologna | 0 – 1 | Blackpool |

4 April 1973

| Roma | 0 – 2 | Oxford United |

4 April 1973

| Torino | 1 – 1 | Fulham |

| Oxford United | 1 – 0 | Como |

| Fulham | 1 – 1 | Bologna |

| Blackpool | 2 – 1 | Roma |

| Newcastle United | 5 – 1 | Torino |

==== Group 2 tables ====
Italian teams

| Team | Pld | W | D | L | GF | GA | Pts |
|---|---|---|---|---|---|---|---|
| Bologna | 4 | 0 | 2 | 2 | 1 | 3 | 2 |
| Torino | 4 | 0 | 2 | 2 | 3 | 8 | 2 |
| Roma | 4 | 0 | 1 | 3 | 2 | 7 | 1 |
| Como | 4 | 0 | 1 | 3 | 0 | 6 | 1 |

English teams

| Team | Pld | W | D | L | GF | GA | Pts |
|---|---|---|---|---|---|---|---|
| Newcastle United | 4 | 4 | 0 | 0 | 10 | 1 | 8 |
| Blackpool | 4 | 4 | 0 | 0 | 7 | 1 | 8 |
| Oxford United | 4 | 2 | 2 | 0 | 4 | 1 | 6 |
| Fulham | 4 | 0 | 4 | 0 | 3 | 3 | 4 |

== Semi-finals ==
English semi-final

11 May 1973

| Crystal Palace | 0 – 0 | Newcastle |
|---|---|---|
| | (ref) |

21 May 1973

| Newcastle | 5 – 1 | Crystal Palace |
|---|---|---|
| | (ref) | Cannon |

Italian semi-final

17 May 1973

| Fiorentina | 1 – 1 | Bologna |

23 May 1973

| Bologna | 1 – 2 | Fiorentina |

== Final ==
3 June 1973

| Fiorentina | 1 – 2 | Newcastle |
|---|---|---|
| | | Superchi (o.g.); Craig 54' |

Stadio Artemio Franchi, Florence
