= 1975–76 Carlisle United F.C. season =

Carlisle United F.C.
1975–76 season
- Manager: Alan Ashman; Bobby Moncur
- Stadium: Brunton Park
- Second Division: 19th
- FA Cup: Third round
- League Cup: Third round
- Anglo-Scottish Cup: Group Stage

For the 1975–76 season, Carlisle United F.C. competed in Football League Second Division.

== Results & fixtures ==
=== Football League Second Division ===
==== League table ====
Pos	Team	Pld	W	D	L	GF	GA	GAv	Pts	Qualification or relegation
17	Oldham Athletic	42	13	12	17	57	68	0.838	38	
18	Bristol Rovers	42	11	16	15	38	50	0.760	38	
19	Carlisle United	42	12	13	17	45	59	0.763	37	
20	Oxford United (R)	42	11	11	20	39	59	0.661	33	Relegation to the Third Division
21	York City (R)	42	10	8	24	39	71	0.549	28	Relegation to the Third Division

Rules for classification: 1) Points; 2) Goal average; 3) Goals scored
(R) Relegated

==== Matches ====
Match Day	Date	Opponent	H/A	Score	Carlisle United Scorer(s)	Attendance
1	16 August	Oxford United	H	1–1		
2	20 August	Fulham	A	0–3		
3	23 August	Chelsea	A	1–3		
4	30 August	Blackburn Rovers	H	0–1		
5	6 September	Notts County	A	0–1		
6	13 September	Portsmouth	H	2–1		
7	20 September	Bristol Rovers	A	1–0		
8	23 September	Sunderland	A	2–3		
9	27 September	West Bromwich Albion	H	1–1		
10	4 October	Plymouth Argyle	A	1–2		
11	11 October	Luton Town	H	1–1		
12	18 October	Orient	A	0–1		
13	25 October	Charlton Athletic	H	1–1		
14	1 November	Nottingham Forest	A	0–4		
15	4 November	Oldham Athletic	H	2–1		
16	8 November	York City	H	1–0		
17	15 November	Bolton Wanderers	A	0–0		
18	22 November	Orient	H	1–2		
19	29 November	Southampton	H	1–0		
20	6 December	Bristol City	A	0–0		
21	13 December	Chelsea	H	2–1		
22	20 December	Oxford United	A	0–0		
23	26 December	Blackpool	H	1–0		
24	27 December	Hull City	A	3–2		
25	10 January	Portsmouth	A	0–1		
26	17 January	Notts County	H	1–2		
27	31 January	Fulham	H	2–2		
28	7 February	Oldham Athletic	A	2–2		
29	14 February	York City	A	2–1		
30	21 February	Bolton Wanderers	H	3–2		
31	24 February	Sunderland	H	2–2		
32	27 February	Charlton Athletic	A	2–4		
33	6 March	Nottingham Forest	H	1–1		
34	13 March	Luton Town	A	0–3		
35	20 March	Southampton	A	1–1		
36	27 March	Bristol City	H	0–1		
37	3 April	West Bromwich Albion	A	0–3		
38	10 April	Bristol Rovers	H	4–2		
39	16 April	Blackburn Rovers	A	0–1		
40	17 April	Blackpool	A	1–2		
41	20 April	Hull City	H	0–0		
42	24 April	Plymouth Argyle	H	2–0		

=== Football League Cup ===
Round	Date	Opponent	H/A	Score	Carlisle United Scorer(s)	Attendance
R2	9 September	Gillingham	H	2–0		
R3	8 October	Everton	A	0–2		

=== FA Cup ===
Round	Date	Opponent	H/A	Score	Carlisle United Scorer(s)	Attendance
R3	3 January	West Bromwich Albion	A	1–3		

=== Anglo-Scottish Cup ===
Round	Date	Opponent	H/A	Score	Carlisle United Scorer(s)	Attendance
GS	2 August	Newcastle United	H	2–0		
GS	5 August	Middlesbrough	A	1–4		
GS	9 August	Sunderland	A	0–1		
