= 1976–77 Carlisle United F.C. season =

Carlisle United F.C.
1976–77 season
- Manager: Bobby Moncur
- Stadium: Brunton Park
- Second Division: 20th
- FA Cup: Fourth round
- League Cup: Second round

For the 1976–77 season, Carlisle United F.C. competed in Football League Second Division.

== Results & fixtures ==
=== Football League Second Division ===
==== League table ====
Pos	Team	Pld	W	D	L	GF	GA	GD	Pts	Qualification or relegation
18	Cardiff City	42	12	10	20	56	67	−11	34	Qualification for the Cup Winners' Cup first round
19	Orient	42	9	16	17	37	55	−18	34	
20	Carlisle United (R)	42	11	12	19	49	75	−26	34	Relegation to the Third Division
21	Plymouth Argyle (R)	42	8	16	18	46	65	−19	32	Relegation to the Third Division
22	Hereford United (R)	42	8	15	19	57	78	−21	31	Relegation to the Third Division

Rules for classification: 1) Points; 2) Goal difference; 3) Goals scored
(R) Relegated

==== Matches ====
Match Day	Date	Opponent	H/A	Score	Carlisle United Scorer(s)	Attendance
1	21 August	Southampton	A	2–1		
2	28 August	Chelsea	A	1–2		
3	4 September	Hull City	H	1–1		
4	11 September	Sheffield United	A	0–3		
5	14 September	Hereford United	H	2–2		
6	18 September	Burnley	H	2–1		
7	25 September	Nottingham Forest	A	1–5		
8	2 October	Charlton Athletic	H	4–2		
9	12 October	Blackpool	H	1–1		
10	16 October	Luton Town	H	1–1		
11	23 October	Wolverhampton Wanderers	A	0–4		
12	30 October	Notts County	A	1–2		
13	6 November	Bolton Wanderers	H	0–1		
14	13 November	Oldham Athletic	A	1–4		
15	16 November	Fulham	A	0–2		
16	20 November	Millwall	H	0–1		
17	27 November	Plymouth Argyle	A	1–0		
18	4 December	Orient	H	1–0		
19	11 December	Bristol Rovers	A	1–2		
20	18 December	Cardiff City	H	4–3		
21	27 December	Blackpool	A	0–0		
22	29 December	Blackburn Rovers	H	1–1		
23	3 January	Notts County	H	0–2		
24	22 January	Southampton	H	0–6		
25	5 February	Chelsea	H	0–1		
26	12 February	Hull City	A	1–3		
27	19 February	Sheffield United	H	4–1		
28	26 February	Burnley	A	1–3		
29	5 March	Nottingham Forest	H	1–1		
30	11 March	Charlton Athletic	A	0–1		
31	19 March	Fulham	H	1–2		
32	22 March	Bolton Wanderers	A	4–3		
33	26 March	Luton Town	A	0–5		
34	6 April	Blackburn Rovers	A	3–1		
35	12 April	Oldham Athletic	H	1–1		
36	16 April	Millwall	A	1–1		
37	19 April	Wolverhampton Wanderers	H	2–1		
38	23 April	Plymouth Argyle	H	3–1		
39	30 April	Orient	A	0–0		
40	4 May	Hereford United	A	0–0		
41	7 May	Bristol Rovers	H	2–3		
42	14 May	Cardiff City	A	1–1		

=== Football League Cup ===
Round	Date	Opponent	H/A	Score	Carlisle United Scorer(s)	Attendance
R1 L1	14 August	Southport	A	2–1		
R1 L2	17 August	Southport	H	0–1		
R1 R	24 August	Southport	A	3–2		
R2	31 August	Arsenal	A	2–3		

=== FA Cup ===
Round	Date	Opponent	H/A	Score	Carlisle United Scorer(s)	Attendance
R3	8 January	Matlock Town	H	5–1		
R4	29 January	Liverpool	A	0–3		
