= 1979–80 Carlisle United F.C. season =

Carlisle United F.C.
1979–80 season
- Manager: Bobby Moncur (to February); Martin Harvey (from February)
- Stadium: Brunton Park
- Third Division: 6th
- FA Cup: Fourth round
- League Cup: First round

For the 1979–80 season, Carlisle United F.C. competed in Football League Division Three.

== Results & fixtures ==
=== Football League Third Division ===
==== League table ====
Pos	Team	Pld	W	D	L	GF	GA	GD	Pts
4	Chesterfield	46	23	11	12	71	46	+25	57
5	Colchester United	46	20	12	14	64	56	+8	52
6	Carlisle United	46	18	12	16	66	56	+10	48
7	Reading	46	16	16	14	66	65	+1	48
8	Exeter City	46	19	10	17	60	68	−8	48

Source: rsssf.com

==== Matches ====
Match Day	Date	Opponent	H/A	Score	Carlisle United Scorer(s)	Attendance
1	18 August	Southend United	A	0–1		
2	21 August	Blackburn Rovers	H	1–1		
3	25 August	Bury	H	1–0		
4	1 September	Millwall	A	0–1		
5	8 September	Gillingham	H	1–2		
6	15 September	Reading	A	0–2		
7	18 September	Rotherham United	H	3–1		
8	22 September	Exeter City	A	2–1		
9	29 September	Chester	H	2–2		
10	2 October	Rotherham United	A	1–4		
11	6 October	Wimbledon	H	1–1		
12	10 October	Blackburn Rovers	A	2–1		
13	13 October	Hull City	A	0–2		
14	20 October	Barnsley	H	3–1		
15	23 October	Mansfield Town	H	1–1		
16	27 October	Oxford United	A	0–1		
17	3 November	Southend United	H	4–0		
18	6 November	Mansfield Town	A	1–2		
19	10 November	Plymouth Argyle	A	2–4		
20	17 November	Sheffield United	H	1–0		
21	1 December	Brentford	H	3–1		
22	7 December	Colchester United	A	1–1		
23	21 December	Grimsby Town	H	0–2		
24	26 December	Chesterfield	A	2–3		
25	12 January	Millwall	H	4–0		
26	19 January	Gillingham	A	1–1		
27	9 February	Exeter City	H	4–1		
28	20 February	Chester	A	0–1		
29	23 February	Hull City	H	3–2		
30	26 February	Sheffield Wednesday	H	0–2		
31	1 March	Barnsley	A	1–1		
32	4 March	Bury	A	2–0		
33	8 March	Oxford United	H	2–2		
34	11 March	Swindon Town	A	0–0		
35	14 March	Wimbledon	A	0–0		
36	18 March	Blackpool	H	2–0		
37	22 March	Plymouth Argyle	H	2–1		
38	29 March	Sheffield United	A	2–0		
39	4 April	Grimsby Town	A	0–2		
40	5 April	Chesterfield	H	0–2		
41	7 April	Blackpool	A	1–2		
42	12 April	Swindon Town	H	2–1		
43	15 April	Reading	H	3–3		
44	19 April	Brentford	A	3–0		
45	26 April	Colchester United	H	2–0		
46	3 May	Sheffield Wednesday	A	0–0		

=== Football League Cup ===
Round	Date	Opponent	H/A	Score	Carlisle United Scorer(s)	Attendance
R1 L1	11 August	Wrexham	A	1–1	Kemp 60'	
R1 L2	12 August	Wrexham	H	1–2	Jones (o.g.) 25'	

=== FA Cup ===
Round	Date	Opponent	H/A	Score	Carlisle United Scorer(s)	Attendance
R1	24 November	Hull City	H	3–3		
R1 R	28 November	Hull City	A	2–0		
R2	15 December	Sheffield Wednesday	H	3–0		
R3	5 January	Bradford City	H	3–2		
R4	26 January	Wrexham	H	0–0		
R4 R	29 January	Wrexham	A	1–3		
