= David Barton (footballer) =

English footballer

Personal information
- Full name: David Barton
- Date of birth: 9 May 1959
- Place of birth: Bishop Auckland, England
- Height: 6 ft 0 in (1.83 m)
- Position: Central defender

Youth career
- Newcastle United

Senior career*
| Years | Team | Apps | (Gls) |
| 1977–1983 | Newcastle United | 102 | (5) |
| 1982 | → Blackburn Rovers (loan) | 8 | (1) |
| 1983–1984 | Darlington | 49 | (3) |
| 1984 | Coundon TT | | |
| 1984–1985 | Blyth Spartans | | |
| 1985–? | Coundon TT | | |
| 1990–1991 | Newton Aycliffe | | |
| 1991–? | Spennymoor United | | |
- * Club domestic league appearances and goals

David Barton (born 9 May 1959) is an English former professional footballer who played as a centre back. He made 159 Football League appearances for Newcastle United, Blackburn Rovers, and Darlington. Barton later appeared in non-league football for Coundon TT, Blyth Spartans, Newton Aycliffe and Spennymoor United. Barton was player-manager of Newton Aycliffe F.C. between 1990 and 1991 and was player-assistant manager at Spennymoor United from 1991.

== Early life ==
Born in Bishop Auckland, County Durham, Barton represented Durham Schools at under-15 level before joining Newcastle United as an apprentice.

== Career ==
=== Newcastle United ===
Barton turned professional with Newcastle in 1977 and made his first-team debut in a 2–0 away win over Leeds United on 2 January 1978. He went on to make 102 league appearances for the club, scoring five goals.

=== Blackburn Rovers (loan) ===
In August 1982, Barton joined Blackburn Rovers on loan, making eight league appearances and scoring once in the Second Division.

=== Darlington ===
He moved to Darlington in February 1983 on loan. He was released on a free transfer by Newcastle United in May 1983 and signed a permanent deal with Darlington in July 1983. Barton captained the side during 1983–84 and retired from professional football after sustaining a knee injury in March 1984.

=== Move to non-league ===
Barton joined Coundon TT in mid-1984. He signed with Blyth Spartans in October 1984 before returning to Coundon TT in 1985.

=== Player-manager ===
Barton was appointed player-manager of Newton Aycliffe F.C. in July 1990. He left the role in December 1991 to become player-assistant manager at Spennymoor United. He left Spennymoor United in 1996.
