= Charlie Crowe =

English footballer (1924–2010)

Personal information
- Full name: Charles Alfred Crowe
- Date of birth: 30 October 1924
- Place of birth: Newcastle upon Tyne, England
- Date of death: 27 February 2010 (aged 85)
- Place of death: North Shields, England
- Position: Defender

Senior career*
Years	Team	Apps	(Gls)
1944–1956	Newcastle United	178	(5)
1956–1957	Mansfield Town	37	(0)
Total		215	(5)
- * Club domestic league appearances and goals

Charles Alfred Crowe (30 October 1924 – 27 February 2010) was an English footballer who played as a defender. He spent the majority of his career at his hometown club Newcastle United. He also spent a season at Mansfield at the end of his career.

== Career ==
Crowe was born in Newcastle upon Tyne in 1924. In his teenage years he appeared for the local football teams, Heaton & Byker Youth Club and Wallsend St. Lukes. He signed for the biggest team in the city, Newcastle United, in October 1944. At the time he joined the club, Newcastle were only able to play friendly matches as World War II was taking place and all the football leagues in England were suspended. He made 24 appearances in two years for Newcastle as a left-back.

He made his FA Cup debut on 5 January 1946 in a match against Barnsley and had to wait until December of that year his official Football League debut; he only made four appearances for Newcastle from January until the end of the 1946–47 season. During the 1947–48 season he featured in just two league games as the club won promotion to the Football League First Division. Crowe found his chances limited during the following years and made only a handful of appearances.

Crowe became a regular member of the Newcastle team in the 1950–51 season, a very successful year for the club in which they finished fourth in the First Division in only their third season back at that level. Crowe was also part of the side that reached the 1951 FA Cup final and participated in a 2–0 victory against Blackpool. Crowe won his only trophy in this match as, despite Newcastle winning the FA Cup a further two times before the end of his career, he did not play in the 1952 final and missed the 1955 match against Manchester City through injury. Crowe had been playing mainly in the reserves for the previous couple of seasons but re-established himself as the first-choice left-half. He was also appointed as captain in place of Joe Harvey.

He moved to Mansfield in February and worked as player-coach in the 1956–57 season. He was selected for the Third Division North representative team in October 1957.

== Retirement ==
Crowe retired from the game in 1957 at the age of 33, having made 178 appearances in the league for Newcastle and scoring five goals from defence. He was offered a coaching job at Newcastle when Charlie Mitten became the manager but he was unimpressed by the wage being offered. He briefly managed in Egypt but was forced to return to England due to the Suez Crisis in the country.

Paul Joannou wrote in his book about the history of Newcastle United, The Black 'n' White Alphabet, "A player who rarely took the headlines, Crowe got on with the rough and tumble in the middle of the field as a spoiler of the opposition's tactics and winner of the ball, while he was also used to good effect as a marker."

== Alzheimer's ==
Crowe was diagnosed with Alzheimer's disease in 1998 while he was living with his 82-year-old wife Ruth in Wallsend. He subsequently moved to Hunter Hall care-home.

In 2009, he began the "Charlie Crowe Appeal" with the aim of helping people with Alzheimer's disease. His daughter Lesley Edmondson started a campaign that aimed to raise £1.5 million to buy a medical scanner for Newcastle University's Campus for Aging and Vitality that can detect early signs of the disease. The campaign was backed by former Newcastle players and managers such as Alan Shearer, Sir Bobby Robson and actor Kevin Whately. A book entitled "Charlie Crowe's Scrapbook" was to be re-released as one of the ways of raising money.

A television programme was broadcast on the BBC show Inside Out for North East England and Cumbria in March 2009. He was 85 years old and the last surviving player from the 1951 FA Cup winning side.

Crowe died in North Tyneside General Hospital on 27 February 2010. Newcastle United dedicated their 2–1 away win over Watford to him thanks to Andy Carroll and Fabricio Coloccini.

== Honours ==
Newcastle United

- FA Cup: 1950–51
