= Mick Burns (footballer) =

English footballer

Personal information
- Full name: Michael Thomas Burns
- Date of birth: 7 June 1908
- Place of birth: Leeholme, Bishop Auckland, England
- Date of death: 5 September 1982 (aged 74)
- Height: 5 ft 11 in (1.80 m)
- Position: Goalkeeper

Senior career*
Years	Team	Apps	(Gls)
1927–1936	Newcastle United	104	(0)
1936–1938	Preston North End	12	(0)
1938–1951	Ipswich Town	157	(0)
- * Club domestic league appearances and goals

Mick Burns (7 June 1908 – 5 September 1982) was an English professional footballer who played as a goalkeeper. During his career he made over 100 appearances for Newcastle United (taking over from Willie Wilson at the end of 1928), and over 150 appearances for Ipswich Town. Born in Leeholme, he also had a spell at Preston North End, featuring on the losing side in the 1937 FA Cup Final.

Burns played his last Football League game for Ipswich in the Third Division South on 6 October 1951, meaning that almost 60 years later he is still among the oldest players ever to have appeared in the Football League, having been 121 days past his 43rd birthday when he bowed out.

== Honours ==
Preston North End

- FA Cup runner-up: 1936–37
