= 1977–78 Carlisle United F.C. season =

Carlisle United F.C.
1977–78 season
- Manager: Bobby Moncur
- Stadium: Brunton Park
- Third Division: 13th
- FA Cup: Third round
- League Cup: First round

For the 1977–78 season, Carlisle United F.C. competed in Football League Division Three.

== Results & fixtures ==
=== Football League Third Division ===
==== League table ====
| Pos | Team | Pld | W | D | L | GF | GA | GD | Pts |
|---|---|---|---|---|---|---|---|---|---|
| 11 | Shrewsbury Town | 46 | 16 | 15 | 15 | 63 | 57 | +6 | 47 |
| 12 | Tranmere Rovers | 46 | 16 | 15 | 15 | 57 | 52 | +5 | 47 |
| 13 | Carlisle United | 46 | 14 | 19 | 13 | 59 | 59 | 0 | 47 |
| 14 | Sheffield Wednesday | 46 | 15 | 16 | 15 | 50 | 52 | −2 | 46 |
| 15 | Bury | 46 | 13 | 19 | 14 | 62 | 56 | +6 | 45 |

Source: rsssf.com

==== Matches ====
| Match Day | Date | Opponent | H/A | Score | Carlisle United Scorer(s) | Attendance |
|---|---|---|---|---|---|---|
| 1 | 20 August | Tranmere Rovers | A | 2–3 | | |
| 2 | 27 August | Plymouth Argyle | H | 0–0 | | |
| 3 | 3 September | Rotherham United | A | 0–0 | | |
| 4 | 10 September | Preston North End | H | 3–1 | | |
| 5 | 13 September | Peterborough United | A | 1–2 | | |
| 6 | 17 September | Oxford United | H | 2–2 | | |
| 7 | 20 September | Chester | H | 0–0 | | |
| 8 | 24 September | Hereford United | A | 0–1 | | |
| 9 | 26 September | Exeter City | A | 1–0 | | |
| 10 | 1 October | Colchester United | H | 1–3 | | |
| 11 | 4 October | Lincoln City | H | 2–3 | | |
| 12 | 8 October | Cambridge United | A | 0–2 | | |
| 13 | 15 October | Bradford City | H | 1–1 | | |
| 14 | 22 October | Gillingham | A | 1–1 | | |
| 15 | 29 October | Chesterfield | H | 2–1 | | |
| 16 | 5 November | Sheffield Wednesday | A | 1–3 | | |
| 17 | 12 November | Portsmouth | H | 3–1 | | |
| 18 | 19 November | Shrewsbury Town | A | 3-0 | | |
| 19 | 3 December | Port Vale | H | 1–1 | | |
| 20 | 10 December | Swindon Town | A | 2–2 | | |
| 21 | 26 December | Walsall | H | 2–0 | | |
| 22 | 27 December | Wrexham | A | 1–3 | | |
| 23 | 31 December | Bury | A | 1–1 | | |
| 24 | 2 January | Sheffield Wednesday | H | 1–0 | | |
| 25 | 14 January | Tranmere Rovers | H | 2–2 | | |
| 26 | 21 January | Plymouth Argyle | A | 1–0 | | |
| 27 | 4 February | Preston North End | A | 1–2 | | |
| 28 | 7 February | Rotherham United | H | 2–1 | | |
| 29 | 11 February | Oxford United | A | 0–0 | | |
| 30 | 25 February | Colchester United | A | 2–2 | | |
| 31 | 1 March | Chester | A | 2–2 | | |
| 32 | 4 March | Cambridge United | H | 1–1 | | |
| 33 | 7 March | Peterborough United | H | 0–0 | | |
| 34 | 11 March | Bradford City | A | 2–2 | | |
| 35 | 18 March | Gillingham | H | 1–0 | | |
| 36 | 25 March | Walsall | A | 0–0 | | |
| 37 | 27 March | Wrexham | H | 1–4 | | |
| 38 | 28 March | Chesterfield | A | 1–2 | | |
| 39 | 1 April | Bury | H | 0-3 | | |
| 40 | 3 April | Exeter City | H | 2–0 | | |
| 41 | 8 April | Portsmouth | A | 3–3 | | |
| 42 | 11 April | Hereford United | H | 2–0 | | |
| 43 | 15 April | Shrewsbury Town | H | 1–0 | | |
| 44 | 22 April | Port Vale | A | 1–0 | | |
| 45 | 26 April | Lincoln City | A | 1–2 | | |
| 46 | 29 April | Swindon Town | H | 2–2 | | |

=== Football League Cup ===
| Round | Date | Opponent | H/A | Score | Carlisle United Scorer(s) | Attendance |
|---|---|---|---|---|---|---|
| R1 L1 | 13 August | Huddersfield Town | A | 1–1 | | |
| R1 L2 | 16 August | Huddersfield Town | H | 2–2 | | |
| R1 R | 23 August | Huddersfield Town | A | 1–2 | | |

=== FA Cup ===
| Round | Date | Opponent | H/A | Score | Carlisle United Scorer(s) | Attendance |
|---|---|---|---|---|---|---|
| R1 | 26 November | Stafford Rangers | H | 2–0 | | |
| R2 | 17 December | Chester | H | 3–1 | | |
| R3 | 7 January | Manchester United | H | 1–1 | | |
| R3 R | 11 January | Manchester United | A | 2–4 | | |
