= Leeholme =

Village in County Durham, North East England

Coordinates: 54.663°N 1.618°W

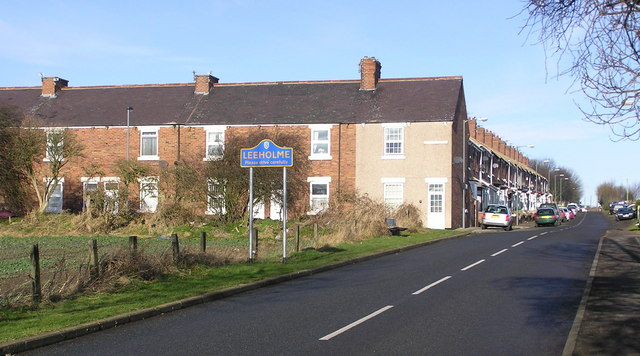
Blind Lane

Leeholme is a village in County Durham, England. It is situated immediately to the north of Coundon. In the 2001 census Leeholme had a population of 513.

== History ==
Leeholme secondary school was situated alongside what is now the Leeholme working men's club. The school has been demolished. Leeholme is approximately 2.2 miles from the market town of Bishop Auckland and has its roots in mining. The village was built to house mineworkers for Leasingthorne Colliery.
