= 1978–79 Carlisle United F.C. season =

Carlisle United F.C.
1978–79 season
- Manager: Bobby Moncur
- Stadium: Brunton Park
- Third Division: 6th
- FA Cup: Third round
- League Cup: First round

For the 1978–79 season, Carlisle United F.C. competed in Football League Division Three.

== Results & fixtures ==
=== Football League Third Division ===
==== League table ====
Pos	Team	Pld	W	D	L	GF	GA	GD	Pts
4	Gillingham	46	21	17	8	65	42	+23	59
5	Swindon Town	46	25	7	14	74	52	+22	57
6	Carlisle United	46	15	22	9	53	42	+11	52
7	Colchester United	46	17	17	12	60	55	+5	51
8	Hull City	46	19	11	16	66	61	+5	49

Source: rsssf.com

==== Matches ====
Match Day	Date	Opponent	H/A	Score	Carlisle United Scorer(s)	Attendance
1	19 August	Hull City	A	1–1		
2	22 August	Chesterfield	H	1–1		
3	26 August	Walsall	H	1–0		
4	2 September	Blackpool	A	1–3		
5	8 September	Colchester United	H	4–0		
6	12 September	Peterborough United	A	0–0		
7	16 September	Lincoln City	A	1–1		
8	23 September	Southend United	H	0–0		
9	25 September	Swansea City	H	2–0		
10	30 September	Mansfield Town	A	0–1		
11	7 October	Plymouth Argyle	H	1–1		
12	14 October	Sheffield Wednesday	A	0–0		
13	17 October	Watford	A	1–2		
14	21 October	Rotherham United	H	1–1		
15	28 October	Swindon Town	H	2–0		
16	4 November	Oxford United	A	0–0		
17	11 November	Blackpool	H	1–1		
18	18 November	Walsall	A	2–1		
19	2 December	Gillingham	A	0–0		
20	9 December	Exeter City	H	1–1		
21	26 December	Chester	A	2–1		
22	30 December	Brentford	A	0–0		
23	20 January	Lincoln City	H	2–0		
24	2 February	Swansea City	A	0–0		
25	10 February	Mansfield Town	H	1–0		
26	13 February	Bury	H	1–2		
27	17 February	Plymouth Argyle	A	0–2		
28	24 February	Sheffield Wednesday	H	0–0		
29	3 March	Rotherham United	A	3–1		
30	6 March	Tranmere Rovers	H	2–0		
31	10 March	Swindon Town	A	0–0		
32	12 March	Southend United	A	1–1		
33	17 March	Shrewsbury Town	H	1–1		
34	20 March	Peterborough United	H	4–1		
35	24 March	Chesterfield	A	3–2		
36	27 March	Hull City	H	2–2		
37	31 March	Oxford United	A	1–5		
38	2 April	Colchester United	A	1–2		
39	7 April	Gillingham	H	1–0		
40	13 April	Bury	A	2–2		
41	14 April	Chester	H	1–1		
42	16 April	Tranmere Rovers	A	1–1		
43	21 April	Brentford	H	1–0		
44	24 April	Watford	H	1–0		
45	28 April	Exeter City	A	2–3		
46	5 May	Oxford United	H	0–1		

=== Football League Cup ===
Round	Date	Opponent	H/A	Score	Carlisle United Scorer(s)	Attendance
R1 L1	12 August	Blackpool	H	2–2		
R1 L2	16 August	Blackpool	A	1–2		

=== FA Cup ===
Round	Date	Opponent	H/A	Score	Carlisle United Scorer(s)	Attendance
R1	25 November	Halifax Town	H	1–0		
R2	16 December	Hull City	H	3–0		
R3	10 January	Ipswich Town	A	2–3		
