= Durham Challenge Cup =

Durham County Challenge Cup
- Organiser(s): Durham County FA
- Founded: 1884; 142 years ago
- Region: County Durham
- Teams: 16
- Current champions: Shildon (7th title)
- Most championships: Sunderland (22 titles) (Note: including "A" and reserve teams.)
- Website: Durham FA County Cup

The Durham County Challenge Cup (commonly known as the Durham Challenge Cup, also known as the Frank Pattison Challenge Cup) is an annual football competition held between the clubs of the Durham County Football Association which was first played in 1884.

== History ==
The competition was first played for in 1884, due to the success of the Northumberland and Durham Association Cup, which in three seasons had seen its entry increase from 6 to 21, requiring the two counties to set up their own competitions.

It is the senior county cup for the historic county of Durham, which includes Durham, Darlington, Gateshead, Hartlepool, South Tyneside, Stockton-on-Tees, and Sunderland. The first winners were Sunderland.

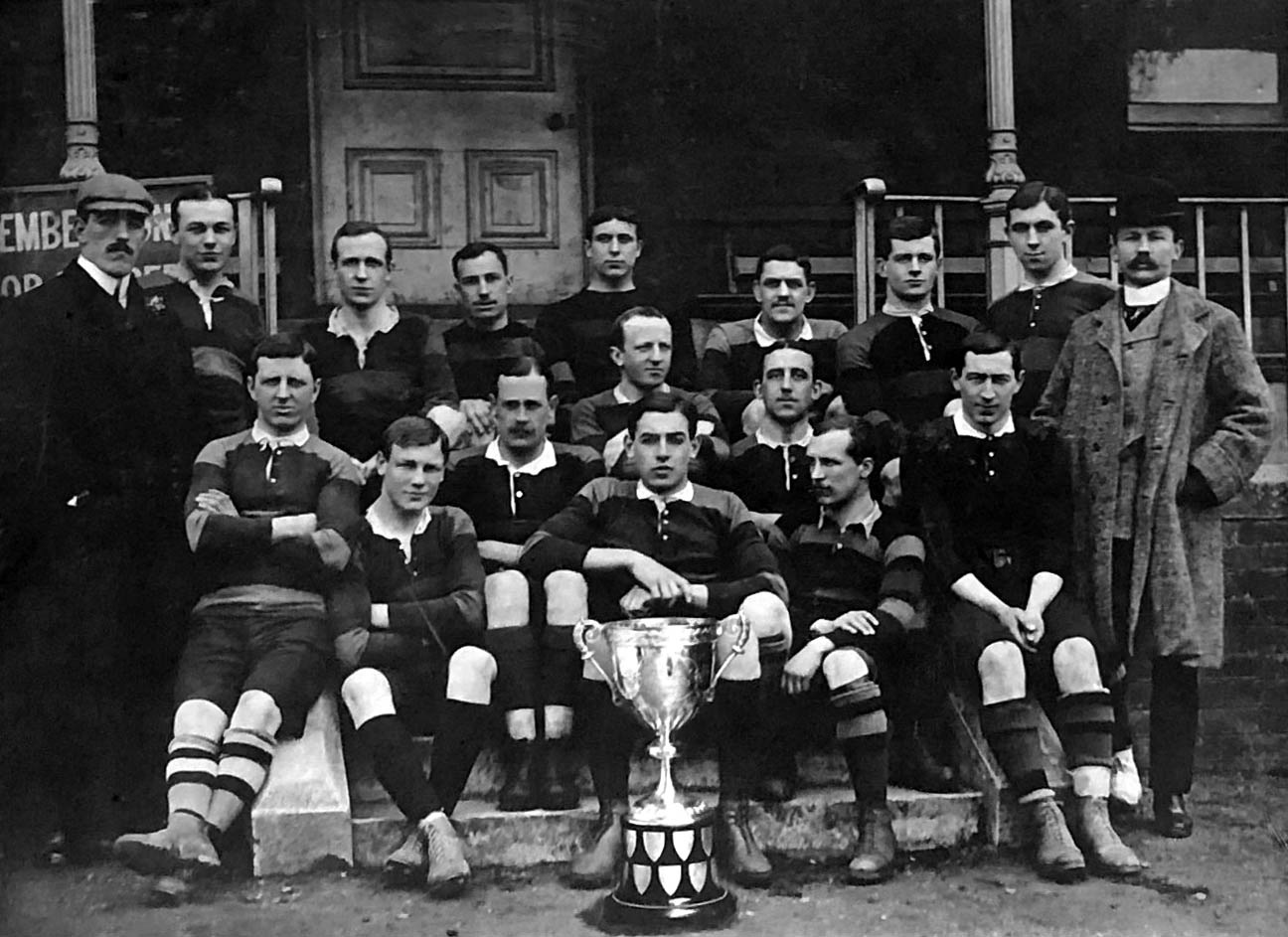
Sunderland players and executives posing with the trophy in 1903

== List of winners ==
Complete list of Durham Challenge Cup winners since its first edition:

- 1883–84: Sunderland
- 1884–85: Darlington
- 1885–86: Bishop Auckland Church Institute
- 1886–87: Sunderland
- 1887–88: Sunderland
- 1888–89: Sunderland Albion
- 1889–90: Sunderland
- 1890–91: Darlington
- 1891–92: Bishop Auckland
- 1892–93: Darlington
- 1893–94: Sunderland 'A'
- 1894–95: Stockton
- 1895–96: Tow Law
- 1896–97: Darlington
- 1897–98: Stockton
- 1898–99: Bishop Auckland
- 1899–1900: Jarrow (1894)
- 1900–01: Sunderland 'A'
- 1901–02: Sunderland 'A'
- 1902–03: Sunderland 'A'
- 1903–04: Sunderland 'A'
- 1904–05: Leadgate Park
- 1905–06: Sunderland 'A'
- 1906–07: Sunderland 'A'
- 1907–08: Shildon Athletic
- 1908–09: Hartlepool United
- 1909–10: Hartlepool United
- 1910–11: South Shields
- 1911–12: Sunderland 'A'
- 1912–13: Sunderland 'A'
- 1913–14: South Shields
- 1918–19: Sunderland 'A'
- 1919–20: Darlington
- 1920–21: Leadgate Park
- 1921–22: Sunderland 'A'
- 1922–23: Sunderland 'A'
- 1923–24: Ferryhill Athletic
- 1924–25: Sunderland 'A'
- 1925–26: Shildon
- 1926–27: Crook Town
- 1927–28: Sunderland 'A'
- 1928–29: Sunderland 'A'
- 1929–30: Spennymoor United
- 1930–31: Bishop Auckland
- 1931–32: Crook Town
- 1932–33: Jarrow
- 1933–34: Jarrow
- 1934–35: Stockton
- 1935–36: Horden Colliery Welfare
- 1936–37: South Shields
- 1937–38: South Shields
- 1938–39: Bishop Auckland
- 1939–40: Blackhall Colliery Welfare
- 1945–46: Spennymoor United
- 1946–47: Blackhall Colliery Welfare
- 1947–48: Consett
- 1948–49: South Shields
- 1949–50: Consett
- 1950–51: Stockton
- 1951–52: Bishop Auckland
- 1952–53: Annfield Plain
- 1953–54: Spennymoor United
- 1954–55: Crook Town
- 1955–56: Bishop Auckland
- 1956–57: Hartlepool United Reserves
- 1957–58: Hartlepool United Reserves
- 1958–59: Consett
- 1959–60: Crook Town
- 1960–61: Consett
- 1961–62: Bishop Auckland
- 1962–63: Spennymoor United
- 1963–64: Horden Colliery Welfare
- 1964–65: West Auckland Town
- 1965–66: Sunderland Reserves
- 1966–67: Bishop Auckland
- 1967–68: Spennymoor United
- 1968–69: Consett
- 1969–70: Evenwood Town
- 1970–71: Ferryhill Athletic
- 1971–72: Shildon
- 1972–73: Spennymoor United
- 1973–74: Spennymoor United
- 1974–75: Spennymoor United
- 1975–76: Spennymoor United
- 1976–77: South Shields
- 1977–78: Ryhope Colliery Welfare
- 1978–79: Spennymoor United
- 1979–80: Seaham Red Star
- 1980–81: Horden Colliery Welfare
- 1981–82: Horden Colliery Welfare
- 1982–83: Spennymoor United
- 1983–84: Coundon TT
- 1984–85: Bishop Auckland
- 1985–86: Bishop Auckland
- 1986–87: Coundon TT
- 1987–88: Bishop Auckland
- 1988–89: Billingham Synthonia
- 1989–90: Eppleton Colliery Welfare
- 1990–91: Billingham Synthonia
- 1991–92: Hebburn
- 1992–93: Murton
- 1993–94: Spennymoor United
- 1994–95: Spennymoor United
- 1995–96: Spennymoor United
- 1996–97: Spennymoor United
- 1997–98: Bishop Auckland
- 1998–99: Bishop Auckland
- 1999–2000: Darlington Reserves
- 2000–01: Bishop Auckland
- 2001–02: Bishop Auckland
- 2002–03: Horden Colliery Welfare
- 2003–04: Billingham Town
- 2004–05: Hartlepool United Reserves
- 2005–06: Whickham
- 2006–07: Consett
- 2007–08: Sunderland Reserves
- 2008–09: Billingham Synthonia
- 2009–10: Billingham Synthonia
- 2010–11: Gateshead Reserves
- 2011–12: Spennymoor Town
- 2012–13: Bishop Auckland
- 2013–14: Shildon
- 2014–15: Shildon
- 2015–16: Newton Aycliffe
- 2016–17: South Shields
- 2017–18: Consett
- 2018–19: Shildon
- 2019–20: Spennymoor Town & Sunderland U23's (Shared)
- 2020–21: West Auckland Town
- 2021–22: Ryhope Colliery Welfare
- 2022–23: Hebburn
- 2023–24: West Auckland Town
- 2024–25: Shildon
- 2025–26: Shildon

=== Wins by teams ===
Club	Wins	First final won	Last final won	Notes
Sunderland	22	1883–84	2019–20	Won 15 titles with Sunderland 'A', 2 with reserves, 1 with U23. Shared 1 trophy with Spennymoor Town.
Bishop Auckland	17	1885–86	2012–13	Won 1 title as Bishop Auckland Church Institute.
Spennymoor United †	15	1929–30	1996–97	Dissolved in 2005.
Shildon	8	1907–08	2025-2026	Won 1 title as Shildon Athletic.
Consett	7	1947–48	2017–18	
South Shields	7	1910–11	2016–17	
Darlington	6	1884–85	1999–2000	Won 1 title with reserve team.
Hartlepool United	5	1908–09	2004–05	Won 3 titles with reserve team.
Horden Colliery Welfare	5	1935–36	2002–03	
Billingham Synthonia	4	1988–89	2009–10	
Crook Town	4	1926–27	1959–60	
Stockton †	4	1894–95	1950–51	Dissolved in 1975.
Spennymoor Town	3	1969–70	2019–20	Won 1 title as Evenwood Town. Shared 1 trophy with Sunderland U23.
West Auckland Town	3	1964–65	2023–24	
Blackhall Colliery Welfare †	2	1939–40	1946–47	Dissolved in 2013.
Coundon TT †	2	1983–84	1986–87	Dissolved in 1991.
Ferryhill Athletic	2	1923–24	1970–71	
Hebburn	2	1991–92	2022–23	
Jarrow	2	1932–33	1933–34	
Leadgate Park †	2	1904–05	1920–21	Dissolved in 1925.
Ryhope Colliery Welfare †	2	1977–78	2021–22	Dissolved in 2022.
Annfield Plain	1	1952–53	1952–53	
Billingham Town	1	2003–04	2003–04	
Eppleton Colliery Welfare †	1	1989–90	1989–90	Dissolved in 2005.
Gateshead	1	2010–11	2010–11	Won with reserves team.
Jarrow (1894) †	1	1899–1900	1899–1900	Disbanded in 1902.
Murton †	1	1992–93	1992–93	Dissolved in 2016.
Newton Aycliffe	1	2015–16	2015–16	
Seaham Red Star	1	1979–80	1979–80	
Sunderland Albion †	1	1888–89	1888–89	Dissolved in 1892.
Tow Law Town	1	1895–96	1895–96	Won as Tow Low.
Whickham	1	2005–06	2005–06	
