= Willie Wilson (footballer, born 1900) =

Scottish footballer

Personal information
- Full name: William Dickson Wilson
- Date of birth: 7 September 1900
- Place of birth: Port Seton, Scotland
- Date of death: 24 June 1973 (aged 72)
- Place of death: Innerleithen, Scotland
- Height: 5 ft 10 in (1.78 m)
- Position: Goalkeeper

Senior career*
Years	Team	Apps	(Gls)
- Musselburgh Bruntonians
1923–1925	Peebles Rovers	51	(0)
1925–1929	Newcastle United	127	(0)
1929–1934	Millwall	148	(0)
1935–1936	Dunfermline Athletic	5	(0)
1936–1937	Peebles Rovers		
- * Club domestic league appearances and goals

William Dickson Wilson (7 September 1900 – 24 June 1973) was a Scottish footballer who played as a goalkeeper for Peebles Rovers and Dunfermline Athletic in the Scottish Football League and for Newcastle United and Millwall in the English Football League.

He became the regular Newcastle goalkeeper immediately after joining the Magpies in 1925 and won the league title in the 1926–27 season, in which he was ever-present (42 matches, part of a sequence of 120 consecutive appearances). He lost his place to Mick Burns at the end of 1928 and moved on to second-tier Millwall where he spent five years, departing when the Lions were relegated following the 1933–34 season.
