= Preben Arentoft =

Danish footballer (born 1942)

Personal information
- Full name: Preben Arentoft
- Date of birth: 1 November 1942 (age 83)
- Place of birth: Copenhagen, Denmark
- Position: Midfielder

Senior career*
Years	Team	Apps	(Gls)
1961–1965	Brønshøj Boldklub	96	
1965–1969	Greenock Morton	104	(12)
1969–1971	Newcastle United	50	(2)
1971–1974	Blackburn Rovers	94	(3)
1974–19xx	Brønshøj Boldklub		
1978	Helsingør IF	4	(0)
Total		348	(17)

International career
1965–1971	Denmark	9	(0)

Managerial career
- 1974–1979: Brønshøj Boldklub
- * Club domestic league appearances and goals

Preben Arentoft (born 1 November 1942) is a Danish former professional footballer who played as a midfielder who played for a number of clubs, most notably Newcastle United and Blackburn Rovers. He played nine games for the Denmark national team.

== Career ==
Born in Copenhagen, Arentoft started playing football with Copenhagen club Brønshøj Boldklub. He made his Danish national team debut in June 1965, and played four national team games while at Brønshøj. He moved abroad to play professionally for Scottish club Greenock Morton. Due to the Danish rules of amateurism, he was no longer eligible for the Danish national team.

In 1969, Arentoft moved to England to play for Newcastle United. He played for Newcastle until 1971, earning the nickname Benny. He made a total of 63 appearances for the club, scoring 3 goals. He helped Newcastle win the Inter-Cities Fairs Cup in 1969, scoring in the second leg of the final. This made him the first Danish football player to win a European cup title. He is also remembered for having to play in goal during a 5–1 win over Manchester United in 1970, coming on for an injured Willie McFaul.

The rules of amateurism on the Danish national team was abandoned in 1971 before a game against Portugal. Arentoft (representing Newcastle United) was picked, along with a handful of other players, to be the first professionals ever to participate on the national team. Denmark lost the game 5–0. He gained another four caps that year to round off his career in the national team.

In 1971, he moved on to English club Blackburn Rovers, before ending his career with Helsingør IF.
