= Alf Maitland =

Scottish footballer (1895–1981)

Personal information
- Full name: Alfred Edward Maitland
- Date of birth: 8 October 1895
- Place of birth: Leith, Scotland
- Date of death: 1981 (aged 84–85)
- Height: 5 ft 9 in (1.75 m)
- Position: Full back

Senior career*
Years	Team	Apps	(Gls)
1913–1914	Leith		
1914	Benwell Adelaide		
1919–1923	South Shields	151	(4)
1923–1924	Middlesbrough	25	(0)
1924–1930	Newcastle United	156	(0)
1930	Jarrow		
1930–1933	Northfleet		
1933–	Salisbury City		
- Shirley Town
–1935	Leamington Town		

International career
1922	Football League XI	1	(0)

Managerial career
- Salisbury City (player-manager)
- * Club domestic league appearances and goals

Alfred Edward Maitland (8 October 1895 – 1981) was a Scottish professional footballer who made over 330 appearances in the Football League for Newcastle United, South Shields and Middlesbrough as a full back.

== Personal life ==
Maitland served in the Royal Air Force during the First World War.

== Career statistics ==
Appearances and goals by club, season and competition
Club	Season	League			National Cup		Total	
Club	Season	Division	Apps	Goals	Apps	Goals	Apps	Goals
Middlesbrough	1923–24	First Division	25	0	1	0	26	0
Newcastle United	1924–25	First Division	11	0	0	0	11	0
Newcastle United	1925–26	First Division	5	0	0	0	5	0
Newcastle United	1926–27	First Division	36	0	3	0	39	0
Newcastle United	1927–28	First Division	38	0	1	0	39	0
Newcastle United	1928–29	First Division	40	0	1	0	41	0
Newcastle United	1929–30	First Division	26	0	2	0	28	0
Newcastle United	Total		156	0	7	0	163	0
Career total			181	0	8	0	189	0

== Honours ==
Newcastle United

- Football League First Division: 1926–27
