= Coundon =

Village in County Durham, England

Coordinates: 54.663730°N 1.634085°W

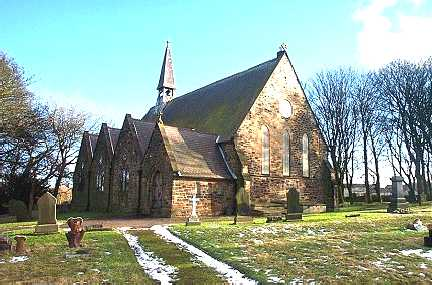
- Church of St James, Coundon

- Location within County Durham
- Population: 2,611 (2001)
- OS grid reference: NZ241219
- Unitary authority: County Durham
- Ceremonial county: County Durham
- Region: North East
- Country: England
- Sovereign state: United Kingdom
- Post town: Bishop Auckland
- Postcode district: DL14
- Police: Durham
- Fire: County Durham and Darlington
- Ambulance: North East
- UK Parliament: Bishop Auckland

Coundon is an old mining village and former civil parish in the County Durham district, in the ceremonial county of Durham, England. The Boldon Book mentions a mine in Coundon in the twelfth century. In 2001 it had a population of 2611. In 2011 the ward had a population of 7139.

== History ==
The name Coundon comes from its original name, "Cunadun", which either translates in Old English "cow's hill", or else derives from the Brittonic toponymic term *cönẹ:d , whose meaning is obscure.

=== Civil parish ===
Coundon was formerly a township and chapelry in the parish of Auckland-St. Andrew, from 1866 Coundon was a civil parish in its own right, on 1 April 1937 the parish was abolished and merged with Bishop Auckland. In 1931 the parish had a population of 6302.

== Sport ==
Coundon had a football team called Coundon TT which played in the FA Cup in 1984. However, the club folded in 1991. Coundon Greyhound Stadium was a greyhound racing stadium situated off the B6287 and was constructed in 1936, on fields to the south side of the Bishop's Park Colliery. It has since been demolished.
