= Joe Harvey (footballer) =

English footballer (1918–1989)

Personal information
- Full name: Joseph Harvey
- Date of birth: 11 June 1918
- Place of birth: Edlington, Doncaster, England
- Date of death: 24 February 1989 (aged 70)
- Position: Half back

Youth career
- Edlington Rangers

Senior career*
Years	Team	Apps	(Gls)
1936	Wolverhampton Wanderers	0	(0)
1936–1938	Bournemouth & Boscombe Athletic	37	(0)
1939–1945	Bradford City	53	(0)
1945–1953	Newcastle United	224	(12)
Total		314	(12)

Managerial career
- 1954–1955: Crook Town
- 1955–1956: Barrow
- 1956–1958: Workington
- 1962–1975: Newcastle United
- * Club domestic league appearances and goals

Joseph Harvey (11 June 1918 – 24 February 1989) was an English football player and manager. He spent much of his career at Newcastle United; he was the club's longest serving captain, manager, and, until 2025, the last to win a major trophy.

== Playing career ==
Harvey began his career at Wolverhampton Wanderers in November 1936. At Wolves Harvey made no appearances and moved on to Bournemouth & Boscombe Athletic, were Harvey went on to make 37 appearances in the 1937–38 season. Harvey was then released by Bournemouth and he signed for Bradford City in 1938.

At the outbreak of World War 2 Harvey joined the Royal Artillery going on to become a sergeant-major in the Royal Army Physical Training Corps. During the war period he made guest appearances for Aberdeen and Dundee United. In the 1943–44 season Harvey made 28 appearances for Bradford City and then 25 appearances in the following season. His form in his last season at Bradford impressed Newcastle United and on 20 October 1945 Newcastle United paid Bradford £4500 for his services.

=== Newcastle United ===
He quickly established himself in Newcastle's youthful side and after an impressive debut against Barnsley was made captain of the side. Before playing for Newcastle Harvey was an established inside forward, at Newcastle he began to settle in the wing-half position. At the end of his first season with the club he was demobbed. Partly thanks to his time as a sergeant, he was an authoritative figure amongst the Newcastle players who had the utmost respect for him. However, his time at the club was not without controversy. In the 1946–47 he was memorably suspended by the club's directors, along with teammate Len Shackleton, after going on strike against the quality of accommodation the club had provided the team. Both players were forced to make a public apology for their actions. Harvey was also believed to have been involved in the illegal selling of tickets for the 1952 FA Cup Final, although he was never charged for this.

External videos
- Winston Churchill meets Harvey in the 1952 cup final. Pathe Films.

Despite the controversy he was still a popular player amongst the supporters because of his attitude and displays on the pitch. In the 1947–48 he was a big part of the team that gained promotion to the First Division, only missing five games throughout the whole campaign.

"As a player he was lean and strong, a tough, uncompromising wing-half who performed best when the contest was at its most fierce... Having been a sergeant-major in the Royal Artillery, Joe Harvey then became a driving force on the field for United bellowing instructions all over the pitch as only he could."

— Newcastle United historian Joannou's view on Harveys playing style in the book The Black 'n' White Alphabet

He captained the team to two successive FA Cup victories in 1951 and 1952. He retired from playing on 1 May 1953 at the age of 34, despite still being a first-team regular. His final game was a 1–0 win over Aston Villa. However his involvement in football and Newcastle was far from over as he worked towards becoming a coach. He began attending coaching sessions set up by Walter Winterbottom soon after retiring from playing. These sessions helped him to continue working at Newcastle as a trainer for two years. During this time he watched from the sidelines as the club won the FA Cup for the third time in a five-year period. In 1954 he took charge of Northern League club Crook Town who had reached the final of the FA Amateur Cup and took intensive training sessions in readiness for their final against local rivals Bishop Auckland, at the time considered the top amateur side in the country. After a 2–2 draw at Wembley before 100,000 fans and another 2–2 draw at St James' Park, Newcastle before 52,000 Crook finally emerged triumphant 1–0 at Ayresome Park, Middlesbrough, in front of a crowd of 39,000. The club felt that Harvey's coaching sessions had made the difference.

== Management career ==
Wanting to find his way into top-level management, Harvey took control of struggling Barrow. Keeping the club in the league proved near impossible; the squad consisted of just five players upon his appointment. Consequently, Harvey had to apply for re-election by goal average only in 1955–56. He soon left Barrow and was appointed manager of Workington in 1956, where he initially struggled too, but Harvey's influence gradually saw the Workington nearing promotion. He applied for the vacant manager's job at his beloved Newcastle United in 1958, but lost out to Charlie Mitten. The position became available again in 1962 and this time Harvey was successful in his application.

=== Newcastle United ===
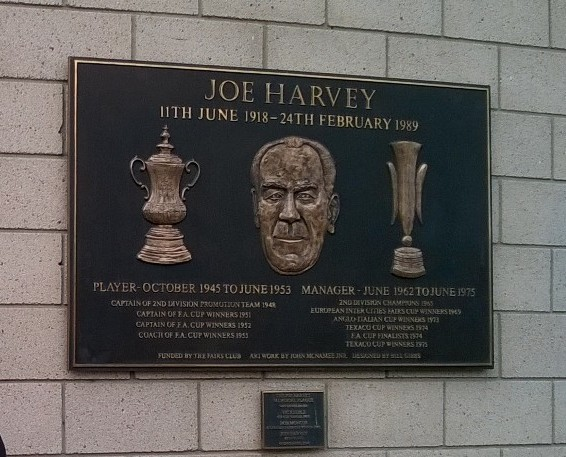
Joe Harvey's plaque outside St James' Park.

Harvey originally joined the coaching staff after he retired from playing. He was still a backroom staff member when the "Magpies" won the FA Cup again in 1954–55.

Harvey was appointed manager of Newcastle United in 1961.

In 1968–69 he won the Fairs Cup with Newcastle.

The last player Harvey signed at this time was John Tudor who was signed for a bargain £888 from Sheffield United and he proved to be an outstanding strike partner for Malcolm Macdonald. With the new look side in place, Newcastle finished 11th in 1971–72. For 1972–1973 Harvey again used Newcastle's excellent youth system and brought through young fullbacks Alan Kennedy and Irving Nattrass. Newcastle improved and finished eighth, just missing out on qualifying for the UEFA Cup. Tony Green was forced to retire at just 26 because of constant knee injuries and Harvey used the compensation money Newcastle got to sign his replacement Terry McDermott from Bury.

1973–74 was a big season for Newcastle United. The new attacking team put together by Harvey was being tipped to take one of the major honours come the season's end. By November Newcastle were second in the league, but they fell away to finish 15th, and in the League Cup they were knocked out in the third round. It was down to the FA Cup. Hendon were first up in the third round and a shock 2–2 draw at home meant that Newcastle had to go through a replay at Vicarage Road to see off the non-league side 4–0. Scunthorpe United were next up in the fourth round, and another shock 1–1 draw at St James' meant another replay against lower league opposition. Macdonald scored twice in the replay to crush Scunthorpe's hopes in a 3–0 win. The fifth round saw a difficult away draw to West Bromwich Albion, on a quagmire of a pitch and in front of the TV cameras. Newcastle were majestic, winning 3–0 with Macdonald scoring again. In the 6th round they were 3–0 down at home to Nottingham Forest when their fans invaded the pitch causing the players to return to the dressing room and play was delayed. When the game did restart Newcastle staged a comeback and won 4.3. The FA ordered the game to be replayed and after an initial 0.0 draw Newcastle won through 1.0 thanks to a McDonald goal. Newcastle faced Burnley at Hillsborough in the semi-final. Macdonald scored two and Newcastle won 2–0; Harvey would sign Burnley defender Geoff Nulty for the next season after impressing in this game. Newcastle United were through to their first FA Cup final since 1955, where they would play Bill Shankly's Liverpool. Newcastle had a poor build up to final with preparations not going to plan: the tracksuit tops the players were meant to be wearing did not turn up, and they wore purple as they walked out at Wembley Stadium. Macdonald was the key man for Newcastle, having scored in every round for a total of eight goals in the competition. Liverpool played well and coasted to a 3–0 win with Kevin Keegan scoring twice. It was the end of an era for Harvey; the next season he signed Micky Burns and paid Sheffield Wednesday a club record £200,000 for Tommy Craig, but Newcastle could only finish a low 15th, despite getting some revenge on Liverpool, beating them 4–1 at St James' Park.

Harvey resigned after pressure from supporters at the end of the 1974–75 season. He did come back and help out as manager for Newcastle United for a few days in August 1980, whilst Newcastle were in their third year in Division 2, and Bill McGarry had just been fired. Harvey took control, and is given credit for steering Newcastle to two wins and a draw. He then saw a friend of his, Arthur Cox, appointed, who would later go on to sign Kevin Keegan and get Newcastle back into the top league again. Harvey has been described as a manager who had a flaw tactically but who had man management skills on a par with the likes of Alex Ferguson.

In April 2014 a Joe Harvey memorial plaque measuring 5 ft × 3 ft in solid bronze was to be erected on the perimeter wall of the Gallowgate End at St James' Park. The plaque was funded by the Fairs Club, founded by Bill Gibbs.

== Honours ==
=== As a player ===
Newcastle United

- FA Cup: 1950–51, 1951–52
- Football League Second Division promotion: 1947–48

=== As a manager ===
Crook Town

- FA Amateur Cup: 1953–54

Newcastle United

- Football League Second Division: 1964–65
- Inter-Cities Fairs Cup: 1968–69
- Texaco Cup: 1973–74, 1974–75
- Anglo-Italian Cup: 1973

== Sources ==
Books

- Cannell, Paul (2012), Fuckin Hell' It's Paul Cannell, Poodle Publishing, ISBN 9781475020793
- Joannou, Paul (18 December 1996). The Black 'n' White Alphabet (First ed.). United Kingdom: Polar Print Group Ltd; First edition. ISBN 978-1899538034.
