= Ollie Burton =

Welsh footballer

Personal information
- Full name: Alwyn Derek Burton
- Date of birth: 11 November 1941 (age 84)
- Place of birth: Chepstow, Wales
- Position: Defender

Senior career*
Years	Team	Apps	(Gls)
1958–1960	Newport County	53	(8)
1960–1963	Norwich City	57	(8)
1963–1972	Newcastle United	188	(6)
Total		298	(22)

International career
1962–1972	Wales	9	(0)
- * Club domestic league appearances and goals

Alwyn Derek "Ollie" Burton (born 11 November 1941) is a former Welsh international footballer, who is a member of the Norwich City F.C. Hall of Fame.

A versatile player at the back or as a centre forward, Burton began his career as a wing-half at Newport County scoring 8 times in 53 appearances. He later spent 10 years playing for Newcastle United, but regards being part of the Norwich City side that won the second-ever Football League Cup in 1962 as one of his greatest achievements.

Burton made 73 first team appearances for Norwich and scored nine goals, before moving to Newcastle in 1963, for a fee of about £35,000. His move followed an FA Cup tie between the two clubs, which Norwich won 5–0. Burton gained nine caps for Wales.

Burton was part of the Newcastle team that won the Inter-Cities Fairs Cup in 1969. The first substitute ever used by Newcastle, following the introduction of the new law. After 9 years at the club he retired in 1972.

== Honours ==
Norwich City

- Football League Cup: 1961–62
