= Irving Nattrass =

English footballer

Personal information
- Date of birth: 20 December 1952 (age 73)
- Place of birth: Fishburn, England
- Height: 5 ft 10 in (1.78 m)
- Position: Right back

Youth career
- Newcastle United

Senior career*
Years	Team	Apps	(Gls)
1970–1979	Newcastle United	238	(16)
1979–1986	Middlesbrough	191	(2)
Total		429	(18)

International career
1976	England U23	1	(0)
- * Club domestic league appearances and goals

Irving Nattrass (born 20 December 1952) is an English former footballer who played primarily as a right back for Newcastle and Middlesbrough.

Born in Fishburn, England, Nattrass attended Ferryhill Grammar School and signed with Newcastle at age 16 on an apprenticeship.

As a youth player Nattrass lacked confidence and made slow progress within the club, even going so far as to look for employment elsewhere as a mechanic. However, he soon found his stride and went on to sign professionally for the club in July 1970, aged 17. A year later Nattrass went on to make his debut against Derby.

The then Newcastle manager Joe Harvey once commented "Nattrass is my Paul Madeley and I can't pay him a bigger compliment than that". Madeley was a Leeds and England player who was dubbed the "Rolls-Royce" of footballers.

Hampered by injuries and disagreements with the Newcastle board he eventually moved to Middlesbrough for the sum of £375,000. Nattrass made his league debut for them against Arsenal on 15 September 1979.

== Career statistics ==
Appearances and goals by club, season and competition
Club	Season	League			FA Cup		League Cup		Other		Total	
Club	Season	Division	Apps	Goals	Apps	Goals	Apps	Goals	Apps	Goals	Apps	Goals
Newcastle United	1970–71	First Division	4	0	0	0	0	0	0	0	4	0
Newcastle United	1971–72	First Division	24	1	2	0	2	0	0	0	28	1
Newcastle United	1972–73	First Division	25	3	2	0	0	0	0	0	27	3
Newcastle United	1973–74	First Division	14	2	0	0	2	0	0	0	16	2
Newcastle United	1974–75	First Division	33	0	2	0	6	0	0	0	41	0
Newcastle United	1975–76	First Division	39	3	7	0	8	1	0	0	54	4
Newcastle United	1976–77	First Division	40	2	3	0	3	2	0	0	46	4
Newcastle United	1977–78	First Division	38	3	4	0	1	0	4 (Note: Appearance(s) in UEFA Cup)	0	47	3
Newcastle United	1978–79	Second Division	21	2	3	1	0	0	0	0	24	3
Newcastle United	Total		238	16	23	1	22	3	4	0	287	20
Middlesbrough	1979–80	First Division	13	0	0	0	1	0	0	0	14	0
Middlesbrough	1980–81	First Division	31	1	5	0	2	0	0	0	38	1
Middlesbrough	1981–82	First Division	27	0	2	0	2	0	0	0	31	0
Middlesbrough	1982–83	Second Division	29	1	5	0	2	0	0	0	36	1
Middlesbrough	1983–84	Second Division	42	0	3	0	2	0	0	0	47	0
Middlesbrough	1984–85	Second Division	30	0	2	0	2	0	0	0	34	0
Middlesbrough	1985–86	Second Division	19	0	1	0	0	0	0	0	20	0
Middlesbrough	Total		191	2	18	0	11	0	0	0	220	2
Career total			429	18	41	1	33	3	4	0	507	22

== Honours ==
Newcastle United

- Football League Cup runner-up: 1975–76

Individual

- Newcastle United Player of the Year: 1977–78
