= Coundon TT F.C. =

English amateur football club

Coundon TT
- Full name: Coundon TT Football Club
- Nickname(s): The Tuns
- Founded: 1976 (as Three Tuns)
- Dissolved: 1991
- Ground: Leeholme School Field (1976–1986)
- 1990–91: Wearside Football League, 14th

Coundon TT Football Club was an English amateur association football club based in the village of Coundon, County Durham.

== Honours ==
- Wearside League
  - Champions 1985–86
  - Runners-up 1983–84, 1987–88
- Durham Challenge Cup
  - Winners - 1984, 1987
