= Geoff Nulty =

English footballer

Personal information
- Full name: Geoffrey Owen Nulty
- Date of birth: 13 February 1949 (age 77)
- Place of birth: Prescot, Merseyside, England
- Position: Midfielder

Senior career*
Years	Team	Apps	(Gls)
	St Helens Town	?	(?)
1967–1968	Stoke City	0	(0)
1968–1974	Burnley	130	(20)
1974–1978	Newcastle United	101	(11)
1978–1980	Everton	27	(2)
Total		258	(33)
- * Club domestic league appearances and goals

Geoffrey Owen Nulty (born 13 February 1949) is an English retired professional footballer who played as a midfielder. His career was blighted by injury and was ended prematurely after a tackle by Jimmy Case in the Liverpool versus Everton Merseyside derby in 1980.

After retiring as a player, Nulty became a coach with Preston and later worked as sub-postmaster as well as developing business interests.

== Career statistics ==
Appearances and goals by club, season and competition
Club	Season	League			FA Cup		League Cup		Other		Total	
Club	Season	Division	Apps	Goals	Apps	Goals	Apps	Goals	Apps	Goals	Apps	Goals
Stoke City	1967–68	First Division	0	0	0	0	0	0	0	0	0	0
Burnley	1969–70	First Division	7	1	0	0	1	1	0	0	8	1
Burnley	1970–71	First Division	31	3	1	0	0	0	0	0	32	3
Burnley	1971–72	Second Division	11	1	0	0	0	0	0	0	11	1
Burnley	1972–73	Second Division	35	6	2	0	1	0	0	0	38	6
Burnley	1973–74	First Division	42	9	6	0	3	0	8	3	59	12
Burnley	1974–75	First Division	4	0	0	0	0	0	0	0	4	0
Burnley	Total		130	20	9	0	5	1	8	0	152	21
Newcastle United	1974–75	First Division	20	1	2	1	0	0	0	0	22	2
Newcastle United	1975–76	First Division	28	7	5	0	7	2	2	0	43	9
Newcastle United	1976–77	First Division	42	3	3	0	3	0	2	0	48	3
Newcastle United	1977–78	First Division	11	0	0	0	0	0	2	0	13	0
Newcastle United	Total		101	11	10	1	10	2	6	0	127	14
Everton	1978–79	First Division	17	1	0	0	2	0	2	0	21	1
Everton	1979–80	First Division	10	1	0	0	4	0	2	0	16	1
Everton	Total		27	2	0	0	6	0	4	0	37	2
Career total			258	33	19	1	21	3	18	3	316	40
