= Tommy Gibb =

Scottish footballer

Personal information
- Full name: Thomas Gibb
- Date of birth: 13 December 1944 (age 81)
- Place of birth: Bathgate, Scotland
- Height: 5 ft 10 3/4 in (1.80 m)
- Position: Midfielder

Youth career
- Wallhouse Rose
- Bathgate Thistle

Senior career*
| Years | Team | Apps | (Gls) |
| 1963–1968 | Partick Thistle | 111 | (18) |
| 1968–1975 | Newcastle United | 199 | (12) |
| 1975–1977 | Sunderland | 10 | (1) |
| 1977–1978 | Hartlepool United | 40 | (4) |
| Total | | 360 | (35) |

International career
| 1968 | Scotland U23 | 1 | (0) |
- * Club domestic league appearances and goals

Thomas Gibb (born 13 December 1944) is a Scottish former professional footballer who played as a midfielder.

== Career ==
Born in Bathgate, Gibbs began his career in junior football with Wallhouse Rose and Bathgate Thistle, before turning professional in 1963 with Partick Thistle. He later played for Newcastle United, Sunderland and Hartlepool United before retiring in 1978. Gibb was part of the Newcastle team that won the Inter-Cities Fairs Cup in 1969.

== Honours ==
Newcastle United

- FA Cup runner-up: 1973–74
