= David Craig (Northern Irish footballer) =

Northern Irish footballer (born 1944)

Personal information
- Full name: David James Craig
- Date of birth: 8 June 1944 (age 82)
- Place of birth: Belfast, Northern Ireland
- Height: 5 ft 9 1/2 in (1.77 m)
- Position: Right-back

Youth career
- Scunthorpe United
- Newcastle United

Senior career*
Years	Team	Apps	(Gls)
1963–1978	Newcastle United	351	(8)
Total		351	(8)

International career
1967–1974	Northern Ireland	25	(0)
- * Club domestic league appearances and goals

David James Craig (born 8 June 1944) is a Northern Irish former professional footballer who played as a right-back.

He first played with Scunthorpe United before he joined Newcastle United in 1960. He made his first team debut for the club in 1963, and went on to make 460 appearances for the club, scoring seven goals. He left the club in 1978 after retiring from the game, and remains seventh-highest appearance-maker for the club. Craig now resides in the North East city of Newcastle. Craig was part of the Newcastle team that won the Inter-Cities Fairs Cup in 1969.

Craig made 25 appearances for the Northern Ireland national team between 1967 and 1974.
