= Bobby Moncur =

Scottish footballer and manager

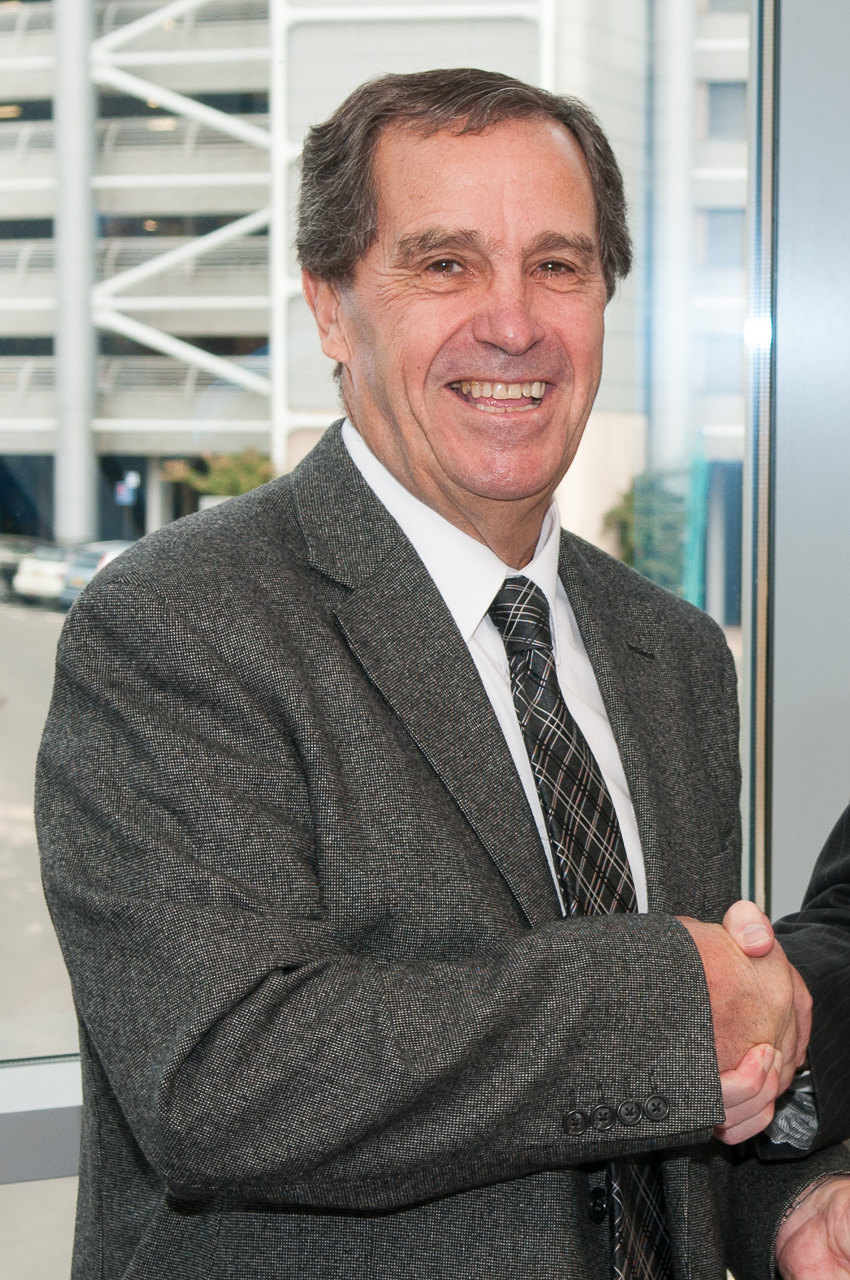

Personal information
- Full name: Robert Moncur
- Date of birth: 19 January 1945 (age 81)
- Place of birth: Perth, Scotland
- Height: 5 ft 9 3/4 in (1.77 m)
- Position: Defender

Senior career*
Years	Team	Apps	(Gls)
1962–1974	Newcastle United	296	(3)
1974–1976	Sunderland	86	(2)
1976–1977	Carlisle United	11	(0)
Total		393	(5)

International career
1968–1972	Scotland	16	(0)

Managerial career
- 1976–1980: Carlisle United
- 1980–1981: Heart of Midlothian
- 1981–1983: Plymouth Argyle
- 1988–1989: Hartlepool United
- * Club domestic league appearances and goals

Robert Moncur (born 19 January 1945) is a Scottish former professional footballer.

Moncur is most famous for his role as captain of Newcastle United in the late 1960s and of the Scotland national side in the early 1970s. Moncur was part of the Newcastle team that won the Inter-Cities Fairs Cup in 1969, scoring three goals across the two legs of the final.

== Early life and playing career ==
Robert Moncur was born on 19 January 1945 in Perth.

He made nearly 300 appearances for Newcastle United and captained the club to their triumph in the 1968–69 Inter-Cities Fairs Cup. After departing Newcastle, Moncur signed for Sunderland. Whilst with Sunderland, Moncur won the Second Division title. He finished his playing career with Carlisle United.

== Coaching career ==
Moncur managed at Carlisle, Heart of Midlothian and Plymouth Argyle.

Following the departure of John Bird, Moncur became manager of Fourth Division club Hartlepool United initially on a temporary basis. He was later announced as the permanent manager of Hartlepool. He led the club to the fourth round of the FA Cup in 1988–89. Hartlepool lost 5–2 in a replay to Bournemouth with a potential fifth round tie against Manchester United on the line. The team ultimately finished the season in 19th position. After a poor start to the following campaign, Moncur resigned on 27 November 1989.

== Post-football ==
Moncur makes semi-frequent appearances on Sky TV as a football pundit. From 11 June 1969 until 16 March 2025, Moncur held the record of being the last Newcastle United captain to lift silverware for the club and was frequently quoted as wanting to lose this honour as quickly as possible. He lost the record on 16 March 2025 when Newcastle won the 2024–25 EFL Cup. Following this victory, Moncur was invited to present the EFL Cup trophy to the St James' Park crowd for a Newcastle United Women's fixture.

== Personal life ==
In September 2007, Moncur was diagnosed with cancer of the colon and nine months later was informed that he was in remission. Moncur was awarded the freedom of Gateshead in November 2008. He was diagnosed with oesophageal cancer in January 2014.

Moncur resides in Low Fell in Gateshead. He is a talented yachtsman and competed in the 1985 Around Britain Race.

== Honours ==
Newcastle United

- Inter-Cities Fairs Cup 1968–69
- FA Cup runner-up: 1973–74

Sunderland

- Football League Second Division: 1975–76

== See also ==
- List of Scotland national football team captains
