= 1971–72 AFC Ajax season =

Dutch football club season

Ajax
1971–72 season
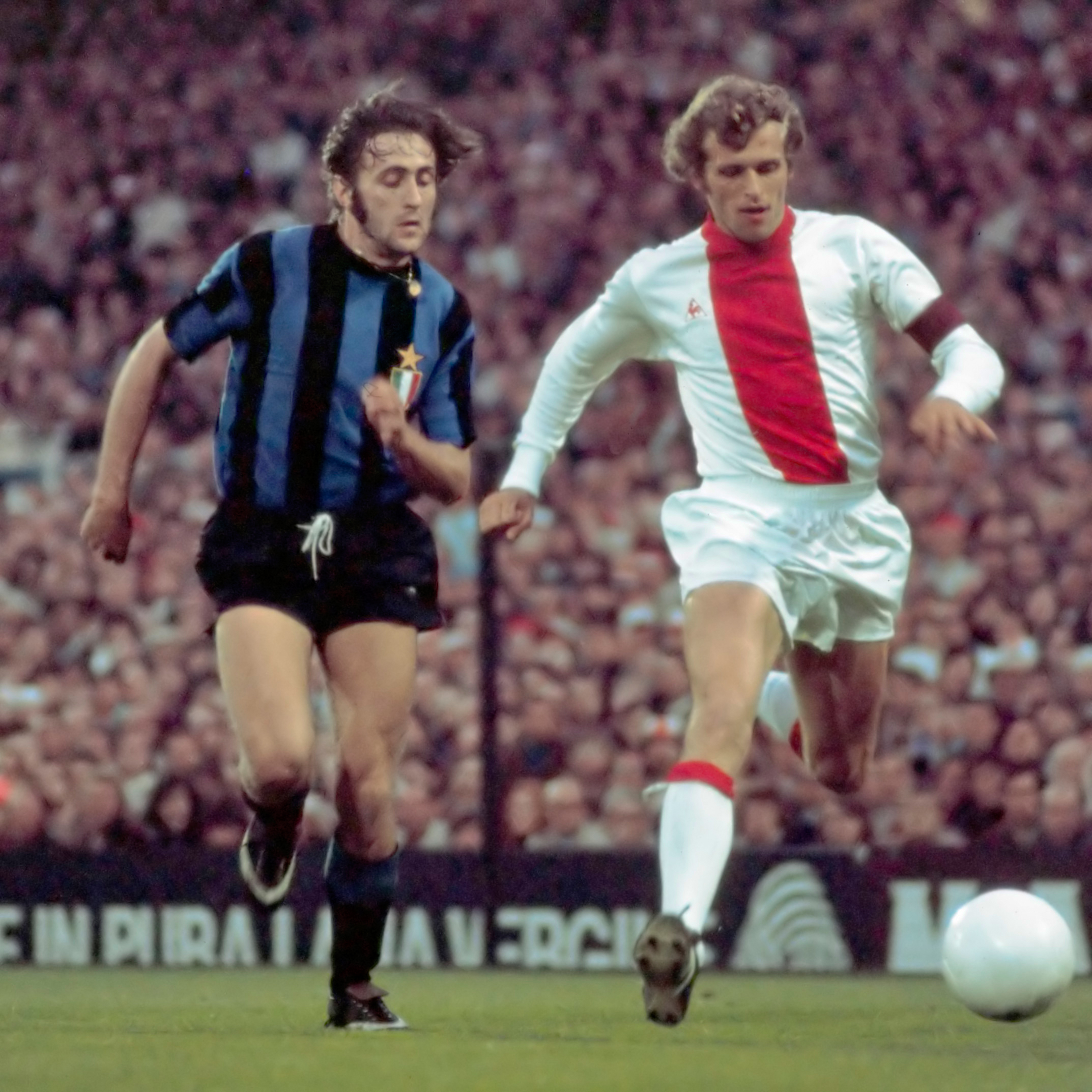
- Ajax playing Internazionale in the 1972 European Cup Final
- Chairman: Jaap van Praag
- Manager: Stefan Kovacs
- Stadium: Olympic Stadium
- Eredivisie: 1st
- KNVB Cup: Winners
- European Cup: Winners
- Top goalscorer: League: Johan Cruyff (25); All: Johan Cruyff (33)
Home colours	Away colours

During the 1971–72 Dutch football season, Ajax competed in the Eredivisie. Ajax won the treble that season, winning the Eredivisie, the 1971–72 KNVB Cup and the 1971–72 European Cup. It was the club's first season without Rinus Michels since 1965.

== First-team squad ==
Note: Flags indicate national team as defined under FIFA eligibility rules; some limited exceptions apply. Players may hold more than one non-FIFA nationality.

No.	Pos.	Nation	Player
1	GK	NED	Heinz Stuy
2	MF	AUT	Heinz Schilcher
3	DF	NED	Wim Suurbier
4	DF	NED	Barry Hulshoff
5	DF	NED	Ruud Krol
6	DF	NED	Ruud Suurendonk
7	MF	NED	Johan Neeskens
8	FW	NED	Sjaak Swart
9	DF	NED	Gerrie Mühren
10	FW	NED	Dick van Dijk
11	FW	NED	Piet Keizer

No.	Pos.	Nation	Player
12	DF	GER	Horst Blankenburg
13	GK	NED	Sies Wever
14	FW	NED	Johan Cruyff
15	MF	NED	Arie Haan
16	FW	NED	Johnny Rep
—	GK	NED	Bob Hoogenboom
—	DF	NED	Louis Donkers
—	DF	NED	Cor ten Bosch
—	MF	NED	Henk Heijt
—	MF	NED	Arnold Mühren
—	FW	NED	Gerrie Kleton

== Transfers ==
=== In ===
Position	Player	From	Type	Fee	Ref.
FW	(Netherlands) Arnold Mühren	(Netherlands) RKSV Volendam	Transfer	€79,113	
MF	(Austria) Heinz Schilcher	(Austria) Sturm Graz	Transfer		
FW	(Netherlands) Johnny Rep	(Netherlands) Jong Ajax	Transfer	Free	
FW	(Netherlands) Gerrie Kleton	(Netherlands) Jong Ajax	Transfer	Free	

=== Out ===
Position	Player	To	Type	Fee	Ref.
MF	(Netherlands) Nico Rijnders	(Belgium) Royal FC Brugeois	Transfer	Free	
DF	(Socialist Federal Republic of Yugoslavia) Velibor Vasović	Retired			

==== Out mid season ====
Position	Player	To	Type	Fee	Ref.
DF	(Netherlands) Ruud Suurendonk	(France) Monaco			

== Results ==
In the 1971–72 season Ajax lost just one game. They were unbeaten at home in both domestic and European competitions. The season included a 12-1 victory over Vitesse at the De Meer Stadion. A result which set a record for the largest win in Eredivisie history. It would stand until 2020, when Ajax beat VVV-Venlo 13–0.

=== Eredivisie ===
15 August 1971 1	Twente	0–2	Ajax	Enschede
		Report	Suurendonk 41' van Dijk 52'	Stadium: Diekman Stadion; Attendance: 25,000; Referee: Leonardus van der Kroft

22 August 1971 2	Ajax	1–0	FC Den Haag	Amsterdam
	Swart 90'	Report		Stadium: De Meer; Attendance: 29,500; Referee: Jef Dorpmans

29 August 1971 3	Rotterdam	1–1	Ajax	Rotterdam
	Klijnjan 33' (pen.)	Report	Swart 82'	Stadium: Het Kasteel; Attendance: 31,000; Referee: Ad Boogaerts

5 September 1971 4	Ajax	1–0	Excelsior	Amsterdam
	Hulshoff 12'	Report		Stadium: De Meer; Attendance: 18,000; Referee: Joop Vervoot

11 September 1971 5	Groningen	0–0	Ajax	Groningen
	Hovenkamp (red card) 84'	Report	Keizer (red card) 84'	Stadium: Oosterpark; Attendance: 17,500; Referee: Koen Hoppenbrouwer

19 September 1971 6	Ajax	5–0	Breda	Amsterdam
	van Dijk 16' (pen.), 54', 87'; Schilcher 67'; Cruyff 90'	Report		Stadium: De Meer; Attendance: 17,000; Referee: Henk Pijper

25 September 1971 7	Eindhoven	1–1	Ajax	Eindhoven
	Devrindt 43'	Report	van Dijk 49'	Stadium: Philips Stadion; Attendance: 22,000; Referee: Theo Boosten

3 October 1971 8	Ajax	1–0	Nijmegen	Amsterdam
	van Dijk 68'	Report		Stadium: De Meer; Attendance: 29,500; Referee: Koen Brouwer

15 October 1971 9	Amsterdam	0–2	Ajax	Amsterdam
		Report	Keizer 16'; Neeskens 61'	Stadium: Olympic Stadium; Attendance: 26,410; Referee: Joop Vervoort

24 October 1971 10	Ajax	4–1	Go Ahead Eagles	Amsterdam
	Hulshoff 14', 35'; Haan 40'; Neeskens 74'	Report	Geels 29' (pen.)	Stadium: De Meer; Attendance: 24,000; Referee: Charles Corver

31 October 1971 11	MVV	0–3	Ajax	Maastricht
		Report	Neeskens 16'; Cruyff 27'; Swart 45'	Stadium: De Geusselt; Attendance: 25,000; Referee: Leonardus van der Kroft

7 November 1971 12	Ajax	2–1	Feijenoord	Amsterdam
	Swart 67'; Israël 76' (o.g.)	Report	Israël 88'	Stadium: De Meer; Attendance: 29,500; Referee: Laurens Van Ravens

14 November 1971 13	Utrecht	2–3	Ajax	Utrecht
	Steen Olsen 31'; Bonsink 83'	Report	Keizer 55', 75'; Rep 80'	Stadium: Stadion Galgenwaard; Attendance: 25,000; Referee: Arie Van Germert

21 November 1971 14	Ajax	5–2	Telstar	Amsterdam
	Cruyff 1', 39', 77'; Keizer 16' van Dijk 45'	Report	van Essen 24' (pen.); Manders 75'	Stadium: De Meer; Attendance: 13,500; Referee: Koen Brouwer

28 November 1971 15	Volendam	0–1	Ajax	Volendam
		Report	Swart 7'	Stadium: Kras Stadion; Attendance: 12,000; Referee: Charles Corver

5 December 1971 16	Ajax	5–0	FC Den Bosch	Amsterdam
	Keizer 13'; Cruyff 26', 54'; Mühren 59' (pen.), 72' (pen.)	Report		Stadium: De Meer; Attendance: 15,000; Referee: Henk Pijper

12 December 1971 17	Vitesse Arnhem	1–3	Ajax	Arnhem
	Gerritsen 20'	Report	Swart 8'; Keizer 35'; Cruyff 60'	Stadium: Nieuw Monnikenhuize; Attendance: 20,000; Referee: Frans Derks

19 December 1971 18	Ajax	1–0	Twente	Amsterdam
	Haan 63'	Report		Stadium: De Meer; Attendance: 29,500; Referee: Jan Keizer (referee)

2 January 1972 19	FC Den Haag	1–2	Ajax	The Hague
	Roodnat 40'	Report	Keizer 50'; Cruyff 53'	Stadium: Zuiderpark; Attendance: 28,500; Referee: Ad Boogaerts

16 January 1972 20	Ajax	2–1	Rotterdam	Amsterdam
	Cruyff 34'; Mühren 75'	Report	Kowalik 51'	Stadium: De Meer; Attendance: 29,500; Referee: Laurens Van Ravens

6 February 1972 21	Breda	2–5	Ajax	Breda
	Schrijvers 43' (pen.), (penalty missed) 79' van Dijk 68'	Report	Keizer 10'; Suurbier 17' van Dijk 19', 23'; Mühren 66'; Cruyff (yellow card) 79'	Stadium: NAC Stadion; Attendance: 18,000; Referee: Charles Corver

26 February 1972 22	Excelsior	0–4	Ajax	Rotterdam
		Report	Cruyff 30', 40' van Nierop 68' (o.g.) van der Heijden 87' (o.g.)	Stadium: De Kuip; Attendance: 23,640; Referee: Koen Hoppenbrouwer

3 March 1972 23	Ajax	7–0	Groningen	Amsterdam
	Cruyff 1', 33', 42'; Swart 5'; Mühren 35', 63'; Keizer 60'	Report		Stadium: De Meer; Attendance: 16,000; Referee: Leonardus van der Kroft

12 March 1972 24	Ajax	4–1	PSV Eindhoven	Amsterdam
	Keizer 44', 49'; Mühren 51' (pen.); Strik 61' (o.g.)	Report	Hoekema 18'	Stadium: De Meer; Attendance: 23,500; Referee: Ad Boogaerts

19 March 1972 25	Nijmegen	0–1	Ajax	Nijmegen
		Report	Neeskens 45'	Stadium: De Goffert; Attendance: 30,000; Referee: Jef Dorpmans

26 March 1972 26	Ajax	2–0	Amsterdam	Amsterdam
	Muller 82' (o.g.); Neeskens 90'	Report		Stadium: De Meer; Attendance: 15,000; Referee: Henk Pijper

1 April 1972 27	Go Ahead Eagles	3–2	Ajax	Deventer
	Smid 7'; Geels 56', 62'	Report	Neeskens 27'; Cruyff 30'	Stadium: De Adelaarshorst; Attendance: 24,000; Referee: Leonardus van der Kroft

9 April 1972 28	Ajax	8–0	MVV	Amsterdam
	Keizer 12', 35'; Swart 31', 82' van Dijk 38', 74'; Neeskens 41'; Mühren 64'	Report		Stadium: De Meer; Attendance: 12,000; Referee: Charles Corver

15 April 1972 29	Feijenoord	1–5	Ajax	Rotterdam
	Posthumus 23'	Report	Haan 9'; Mühren 19'; Cruyff 40', 58'; Keizer 83'	Stadium: De Kuip; Attendance: 62,257; Referee: Ad Boogaerts

23 April 1972 30	Ajax	4–0	Utrecht	Amsterdam
	Swart 50' van Dijk 60'; Mühren 68' (pen.); Cruyff 75'	Report		Stadium: De Meer; Attendance: 22,000; Referee: Theo Boosten

30 April 1972 31	Telstar	1–2	Ajax	Velsen
	Jonker 24'	Report	Swart 28'; Hulshoff 72'	Stadium: Sportpark Schoonenberg; Attendance: 21,000; Referee: Jef Dorpmans

7 May 1972 32	Ajax	2–0	Volendam	Amsterdam
	Cruyff 8' van Dijk 70'	Report		Stadium: De Meer; Attendance: 11,000; Referee: Arie Van Gemert

14 May 1972 33	Den Bosch	0–1	Ajax	's-Hertogenbosch
		Report	Cruyff 86'	Stadium: De Vliert; Attendance: 19,000; Referee: Koen Brouwer

19 May 1972 34	Ajax	12–1	Vitesse	Amsterdam
	Neeskens 10', 28', 88'; Cruyff 32', 42', 47', 78' van Dijk 49', 51', 81'; Mühren 63'; Hulshoff 70'	Report	Veenendaal 75'	Stadium: De Meer; Attendance: 6,000; Referee: Joop Vervoort

=== KNVB Cup ===
9 January 1972 Round 1	Ajax	8–3	Zwolle	Amsterdam
	Swart; Cruyff; Mühren; Rorije (o.g.); Keizer; Neeskens		Goal	Stadium: De Meer

20 February 1972 Round of 16	Ajax	3–0	Go Ahead Eagles	Amsterdam
	Haan; Swart; Hulshoff			Stadium: De Meer

29 March 1972 Quarter finals	Ajax	1–0	Nijmegen	Amsterdam
	Keizer			Stadium: De Meer

11 April 1972 Semi–finals	Ajax	2–0	Volendam	Amsterdam
	van Dijk; Neeskens			Stadium: De Meer

11 May 1972 Final	Ajax	3–2	FC Den Haag	Rotterdam
	Cruyff; Mühren (pen.); Keizer		Van Eeden; Mansveld (pen.)	Stadium: De Kuip; Attendance: 60,000

=== European Cup ===
15 September 1971 Round 1	Ajax (Netherlands)	2–0	(East Germany) Dynamo Dresden	Amsterdam
19:15	Swart 2'; Keizer 18'	Report		Stadium: Olympic Stadium; Attendance: 45,027; Referee: Milivoje Gugulović

29 September 1971 Round 1	Dynamo Dresden (East Germany)	0–0 (0–2 agg.)	(Netherlands) Ajax	Dresden
18:30	Sammer (yellow card) 14'	Report	Haan (yellow card) 28'	Stadium: Dynamostadion; Attendance: 32,307; Referee: Ken Burns (referee)

20 October 1971 Round of 16	Marseille (France)	1–2	(Netherlands) Ajax	Marseille
19:30	Gress 9'	Report	Keizer 39'; Cruyff 68'	Stadium: Stade Vélodrome; Attendance: 48,039; Referee: Robert Schaut

3 November 1971 Round of 16	Ajax (Netherlands)	4–1 (6–2 agg.)	(France) Marseille	Amsterdam
19:15	Cruyff 32', 64'; Swart 37'; Haan 80'; Neeskens (yellow card)	Report	Couécou (yellow card) 10' (goal) 17'; Skoblar (yellow card) 44'	Stadium: Olympic Stadium; Attendance: 53,785; Referee: Alisair McKenzie

8 March 1972 Quarter finals	Ajax (Netherlands)	2–1	(England) Arsenal	Amsterdam
19:15	Mühren 26', 70' (pen.)	Report	Kennedy 14' (yellow card) 44'	Stadium: Olympic Stadium; Attendance: 53,754; Referee: Leonidas Vamvakopoulos

22 March 1972 Quarter finals	Arsenal (England)	0–1 (1–3 agg.)	(Netherlands) Ajax	London
18:30	Storey (yellow card) 60'	Report	Graham 15' (o.g.)	Stadium: Arsenal Stadium; Attendance: 56,155; Referee: Ferdinand Marschall

5 April 1972 Semi finals	Ajax (Netherlands)	1–0	(Portugal) Benfica	Amsterdam
19:15	Swart 64'	Report		Stadium: Olympic Stadium; Attendance: 53,921; Referee: Karlo Kruashvili

19 April 1972 Semi finals	Benfica (Portugal)	0–0 (0–1 agg.)	(Netherlands) Ajax	Lisbon
21:45		Report	Keizer (yellow card) 53'	Stadium: Estádio da Luz; Attendance: 58,983; Referee: Norman Burtenshaw

31 May 1972 Final	Internazionale (Italy)	0–2	(Netherlands) Ajax	Rotterdam
19:30	Boninsegna (yellow card) 79'	Report; MatchCentre	Cruyff 48', 77'	Stadium: De Kuip; Attendance: 61,354; Referee: Robert Héliès

== Statistics ==
=== Goals record ===
Rank	Nat.	Po.	Name	Eredivisie	European Cup	KNVB Cup	Total
1	(Netherlands)	FW	Johan Cruyff	25	5	3	33
2	(Netherlands)	FW	Piet Keizer	14	2	3	19
3	(Netherlands)	FW	Dick van Dijk	16	0	1	17
3	(Netherlands)	FW	Sjaak Swart	11	3	2	17
5	(Netherlands)	DF	Gerrie Mühren	9	2	2	13
6	(Netherlands)	MF	Johan Neeskens	10	0	2	12
7	(Netherlands)	DF	Barry Hulshoff	5	0	1	6
8	(Netherlands)	MF	Arie Haan	3	1	1	5
9	(Netherlands)	MF	Arnold Mühren	2	0	0	2
10	(Netherlands)	FW	Johnny Rep	1	0	0	1
10	(Austria)	MF	Heinz Schilcher	1	0	0	1
10	(Netherlands)	DF	Wim Suurbier	1	1	0	2
10	(Netherlands)	DF	Ruud Suurendonk	1	0	0	1
