= 1970–71 AFC Ajax season =

Ajax
1970–71 season
- Chairman: Jaap van Praag
- Manager: Rinus Michels
- Stadium: De Meer Stadion; Olympisch Stadion
- Eredivisie: 2nd
- KNVB Cup: Winners
- European Cup: Winners
- Top goalscorer: League: Johan Cruyff (25); All: Johan Cruyff (32)
- Highest home attendance: 65,000
- Average home league attendance: 25,059
Home colours

During the 1970–71 Dutch football season, Ajax competed in the Eredivisie. During that season, they finished as runners-up in the league, as well as winning both the 1970–71 KNVB Cup and the 1970–71 European Cup. It was Rinus Michels' sixth and final season as manager before rejoining the club in 1975.

== Squad ==
Note: Flags indicate national team as defined under FIFA eligibility rules; some limited exceptions apply. Players may hold more than one non-FIFA nationality.

No.	Pos.	Nation	Player
—	GK	NED	Heinz Stuy
—	GK	NED	Sies Wever
—	GK	NED	Bob Hoogenboom
—	DF	SRB	Velibor Vasović (captain)
—	DF	NED	Dirk Visser
—	DF	GER	Horst Blankenburg
—	DF	NED	Barry Hulshoff
—	DF	NED	Ruud Krol
—	DF	NED	Wim Suurbier
—	DF	NED	Bram Braam
—	MF	NED	Loet Donkers
—	MF	NED	Arie Haan
—	MF	NED	Nico Rijnders

No.	Pos.	Nation	Player
—	MF	NED	Johan Neeskens
—	MF	NED	Ruud Suurendonk
—	MF	NED	Theo Husers
—	MF	NED	Gerrie Mühren
—	MF	ISR	Ronnie Calderon
—	FW	NED	Johan Cruyff
—	FW	NED	Piet Keizer
—	FW	NED	Johnny Rep
—	FW	NED	Sjaak Swart
—	FW	NED	Dick van Dijk
—	FW	NED	Sjoerd Ruiter
—	FW	NED	George van Bockel
—	FW	NED	Bas du Mortier

== Transfers ==
=== In ===
Position	Player	From	Type	Fee	Date	Ref.
MF	(Netherlands) Johan Neeskens	(Netherlands) RCH	Transfer	€102,000	13 June 1970	
GK	(Netherlands) Sies Wever	(Netherlands) FC Assen	Transfer		1 July 1970	
DF	(Netherlands) Dirk Visser	(Netherlands) Jong Ajax	Transfer	Free	1 July 1970	
FW	(Netherlands) Bas du Mortier	(Netherlands) Stormvogels	Transfer		16 July 1970	
DF	(Germany) Horst Blankenburg	(Netherlands) 1860 Munich	Transfer		1 January 1971	

=== Out ===
Position	Player	To	Type	Fee	Date	Ref.
GK	(Netherlands) Gert Bals	(Netherlands) Vitesse	Transfer	€45,500	1 July 1970	
DF	(Netherlands) Anton Pronk	(Netherlands) Utrecht	Transfer	€23,000	1 July 1970	
MF	(Netherlands) Bennie Muller	(Netherlands) Holland Sport	Transfer	€9,000	1 July 1970	
DF	(Netherlands) John van Wensveen	(Netherlands) Heerenveen	Transfer	€4,500	1 July 1970	
FW	(Denmark) Tom Søndergaard	(Netherlands) Metz	Transfer		1 July 1970	
MF	(Netherlands) Henny Vredenbregt	(Netherlands) DWS	Transfer		1 July 1970	

==== Out mid season ====
Position	Player	To	Type	Fee	Date	Ref.
FW	(Netherlands) Henk Groot	Retired			1 October 1970	

== Competitions ==
=== Overall record ===
Competition	First match	Last match	Starting round	Final position	Record							
Competition	First match	Last match	Starting round	Final position	Pld	W	D	L	GF	GA	GD	Win %
Eredivisie	23 August 1970	5 June 1971	Matchday 1	2nd	34	24	5	5	90	20	+70	70.59
KNVB Cup	8 November 1970	20 May 1971	Second Round	Winners	6	5	1	0	15	4	+11	83.33
European Cup	16 September 1970	2 June 1971	First Round	Winners	9	6	1	2	17	5	+12	66.67
Total					49	35	7	7	122	29	+93	71.43

Source: Competitions

=== Eredivisie ===
Pos	Team	Pld	W	D	L	GF	GA	GD	Pts	Qualification or relegation
1	Feijenoord	34	26	5	3	82	25	+57	57	Qualified for 1971–72 European Cup (Note: AFC Ajax competed in the 1971–72 European Cup as defending champions.)
2	AFC Ajax	34	24	5	5	90	20	+70	53	Qualified for 1971–72 European Cup
3	ADO Den Haag	34	21	8	5	62	27	+35	50	Qualified for 1971–72 UEFA Cup
4	PSV Eindhoven	34	21	7	6	73	25	+48	49	Qualified for 1971–72 UEFA Cup
5	FC Twente	34	19	10	5	48	18	+30	48	
6	Sparta Rotterdam	34	16	13	5	54	34	+20	45	Qualified for 1971–72 UEFA Cup Winners' Cup
7	Go Ahead Eagles	34	15	8	11	49	43	+6	38	
8	NEC	34	12	10	12	43	36	+7	34	
9	FC Utrecht	34	13	7	14	46	64	−18	33	
10	FC Volendam	34	9	10	15	34	48	−14	28	
11	Telstar	34	9	9	16	32	46	−14	27	
12	DWS	34	5	17	12	26	54	−28	27	
13	MVV Maastricht	34	8	10	16	28	42	−14	26	
14	NAC	34	7	10	17	40	61	−21	24	
15	Holland Sport	34	5	14	15	34	60	−26	24	Merged with ADO Den Haag to form FC Den Haag
16	SBV Excelsior	34	5	10	19	22	66	−44	20	
17	AZ '67	34	3	9	22	24	76	−52	15	Relegated to Eerste Divisie
18	HFC Haarlem	34	1	12	21	22	64	−42	14	Relegated to Eerste Divisie

Source: rsssf.com

==== Results summary ====
Overall								Home						Away					
Pld	W	D	L	GF	GA	GD	Pts	W	D	L	GF	GA	GD	W	D	L	GF	GA	GD
34	24	5	5	90	20	+70	77	15	1	1	63	11	+52	9	4	4	27	9	+18

Source: Eredivisie

==== Results by round ====
Round	1	2	3	4	5	6	7	8	9	10	11	12	13	14	15	16	17	18	19	20	21	22	23	24	25	26	27	28	29	30	31	32	33	34
Ground	A	H	A	H	A	H	A	H	A	H	A	H	H	A	H	A	H	A	H	A	H	H	A	A	H	H	A	A	A	H	H	A	H	A
Result	D	W	L	W	W	W	D	D	L	W	W	W	W	W	W	D	W	L	W	W	W	W	W	D	W	W	W	W	W	W	W	W	L	L
Position	9	5	8	5	4	4	5	5	6	6	6	6	5	4	4	3	3	6	6	5	4	2	1	1	1	1	1	1	1	1	1	1	2	2

Source: Eredivisie
A = Away; H = Home; W = Win; D = Draw; L = Loss

==== Matches ====
23 August 1970 1	NEC	0–0	Ajax	Nijmegen
CET (UTC+1)		Report		Stadium: De Goffert; Attendance: 28,500; Referee: Jef Dorpmans

30 August 1970 2	Ajax	2–0	MVV Maastricht	Amsterdam
CET (UTC+1)	Krol 40'; Swart 65'	Report		Stadium: De Meer Stadion; Attendance: 17,000; Referee: Leonardus van der Kroft

6 September 1970 3	ADO Den Haag	1–0	Ajax	The Hague
CET (UTC+1)	Schoenmaker 24'	Report		Stadium: Zuiderpark; Attendance: 26,000; Referee: Laurens van Ravens

12 September 1970 4	Ajax	4–0	DWS	Amsterdam
CET (UTC+1)	Keizer 35' van Dijk 60', 80'; Suurendonk 65'	Report		Stadium: De Meer Stadion; Attendance: 18,000; Referee: Ad Boogaerts

20 September 1970 5	Volendam	0–3	Ajax	Volendam
CET (UTC+1)		Report	Keizer 31' van Dijk 80'; Suurendonk 90'	Stadium: Kras Stadion; Attendance: 20,000; Referee: Theo Boosten

27 September 1970 6	Ajax	3–1	Telstar	Amsterdam
CET (UTC+1)	Krol 9' van Dijk 40', 75'	Report	de Vries 18'	Stadium: De Meer Stadion; Attendance: 17,000; Referee: Arie van Gemert

3 October 1970 7	Excelsior	1–1	Ajax	Rotterdam
CET (UTC+1)	Kwakkernaat 74'	Report	van Dijk 52'	Stadium: Stadion Woudestein; Attendance: 9,500; Referee: Koen Brouwer Jr.

16 October 1970 8	Ajax	2–2	Sparta Rotterdam	Amsterdam
CET (UTC+1)	Suurendonk 49'; Vasović 56' (pen.)	Report	Heijerman 24' (pen.), 76' (pen.)	Stadium: Olympisch Stadion; Attendance: 40,000; Referee: Laurens van Ravens

25 October 1970 9	Twente	1–0	Ajax	Enschede
CET (UTC+1)	van de Kerkhof 86'	Report		Stadium: Diekman Stadion; Attendance: 23,500; Referee: Leo van der Kroft

30 October 1970 10	Ajax	1–0	PSV Eindhoven	Amsterdam
CET (UTC+1)	Mühren 69'	Report		Stadium: De Meer Stadion; Attendance: 50,000; Referee: Theo Boosten

15 November 1970 11	NAC	0–2	Ajax	Breda
CET (UTC+1)		Report	Keizer 12'; Cruyff 43'	Stadium: NAC Stadion; Attendance: 20,000; Referee: Ben Hoppenbrouwer

22 November 1970 12	Ajax	2–1	Holland Sport	Amsterdam
CET (UTC+1)	Swart 40', 67'	Report	Roggeveen 50'	Stadium: De Meer Stadion; Attendance: 14,500; Referee: Frans Derks

29 November 1970 13	Ajax	8–1	AZ '67	Amsterdam
CET (UTC+1)	Hulshoff 15'; Mühren 17'; Cruyff 22', 38', 43', 72', 73', 76'	Report	de Jager 55'	Stadium: De Meer Stadion; Attendance: 18,000; Referee: Jan Godding

6 December 1970 14	HFC Haarlem	0–5	Ajax	Haarlem
CET (UTC+1)		Report	Vasović 23' van Dijk 32', 85'; Rijnders 34'; Mühren 52'	Stadium: Haarlem Stadion; Attendance: 16,500; Referee: Ad Boogaerts

13 December 1970 15	Ajax	7–1	Utrecht	Amsterdam
CET (UTC+1)	Swart 6', 27', 82' van Dijk 31'; Cruyff 39', 40', 88'	Report	Groenendijk 29'	Stadium: De Meer Stadion; Attendance: 23,000; Referee: Henk Pijper

20 December 1970 16	Feyenoord	1–1	Ajax	Rotterdam
CET (UTC+1)	Hasil 58'	Report	Rijnders 35'	Stadium: De Kuip; Attendance: 64,596; Referee: Leonardus van der Kroft

10 January 1971 17	Ajax	4–1	NEC	Amsterdam
CET (UTC+1)	van Dijk 8', 25'; Suurbier 9'; Cruyff 40'	Report	Jendrossek 73'	Stadium: De Meer Stadion; Attendance: 18,000; Referee: Ben Hoppenbrouwer

17 January 1971 18	MVV Maastricht	1–0	Ajax	Maastricht
CET (UTC+1)	Dijkstra 82'	Report		Stadium: De Geusselt; Attendance: 24,000; Referee: Joop Vervoort

24 January 1971 19	Ajax	3–0	ADO Den Haag	Amsterdam
CET (UTC+1)	Keizer 14', 16'; Cruyff 43'	Report		Stadium: De Meer Stadion; Attendance: 25,000; Referee: Theo Boosten

31 January 1971 20	DWS	0–1	Ajax	Amsterdam
CET (UTC+1)		Report	Swart 88'	Stadium: Olympisch Stadion; Attendance: 27,500; Referee: Arie van Gemert

7 February 1971 21	Ajax	5–1	Go Ahead Eagles	Amsterdam
CET (UTC+1)	Keizer 16'; Swart 31', 63'; Mühren 48'; Cruyff 73'	Report	Geels 51'	Stadium: De Meer Stadion; Attendance: 20,000; Referee: Jan Keizer

21 February 1971 22	Ajax	4–0	Volendam	Amsterdam
CET (UTC+1)	Keizer 29'; Mühren 41'; Cruyff 48' van Dijk 83'	Report		Stadium: De Meer Stadion; Attendance: 22,000; Referee: Henk Pijper

28 February 1971 23	Telstar	0–1	Ajax	Velsen-Zuid
CET (UTC+1)		Report	Cruyff 21'	Stadium: Sportpark Schoonenberg; Attendance: 20,000; Referee: Laurens van Ravens

21 March 1971 24	Sparta Rotterdam	0–0	Ajax	Rotterdam
CET (UTC+1)		Report		Stadium: Het Kasteel; Attendance: 31,000; Referee: Ad Boogaerts

28 March 1971 25	Ajax	3–0	Twente	Amsterdam
CET (UTC+1)	Drost 3' (o.g.); Hulshoff 48'; Swart 58'	Report		Stadium: De Meer Stadion; Attendance: 26,000; Referee: Theo Boosten

10 April 1971 26	Ajax	7–0	Excelsior	Amsterdam
CET (UTC+1)	Swart 19', 44'; Mühren 39', 66' (pen.), 75' van Dijk 62', 63'	Report		Stadium: De Meer Stadion; Attendance: 11,500; Referee: Leo van der Kroft

18 April 1971 27	PSV Eindhoven	0–3	Ajax	Eindhoven
CET (UTC+1)		Report	Cruyff 35', 47' van Dijk 67'	Stadium: Philips Sportpark; Attendance: 22,000; Referee: Jef Dorpmans

2 May 1971 29	Holland Sport	0–3	Ajax	The Hague
CET (UTC+1)		Report	van Dijk 27', 43'; Cruyff 90'	Stadium: Sportpark Houtrust; Attendance: 15,000; Referee: Arie van Gemert

9 May 1971 30	AZ '67	0–3	Ajax	Alkmaar
CET (UTC+1)		Report	van Dijk 20'; Keizer 35'; Haan 45'	Stadium: Alkmaarderhout; Attendance: 12,500; Referee: Henk Pijper

12 May 1971 28	Ajax	3–0	NAC	Amsterdam
CET (UTC+1)	Swart 51', 58'; Suurbier 84'	Report		Stadium: De Meer Stadion; Attendance: 15,000; Referee: Joop Vervoort

16 May 1971 31	Ajax	4–0	HFC Haarlem	Amsterdam
CET (UTC+1)	Cruyff 3'; Mühren 35' (pen.); Swart 48', 84'	Report		Stadium: De Meer Stadion; Attendance: 14,000; Referee: Leo van der Kroft

25 May 1971 32	Utrecht	0–3	Ajax	Utrecht
CET (UTC+1)		Report	Mühren 30'; Cruyff 47', 83'	Stadium: Galgenwaard; Attendance: 23,000; Referee: Jan Keizer

27 May 1971 33	Ajax	1–3	Feyenoord	Amsterdam
CET (UTC+1)	Keizer 11'	Report	Kindvall 53'; Schneider 61', 84'	Stadium: Olympisch Stadion; Attendance: 65,000; Referee: Ad Boogaerts

5 June 1971 34	Go Ahead Eagles	4–1	Ajax	Deventer
CET (UTC+1)	Hoekema 47', 63', 68'; Wesselink 60'	Report	Suurbier 58'	Stadium: De Adelaarshorst; Attendance: 24,000; Referee: Jef Dorpmans

=== KNVB Cup ===
8 November 1970 Second round	Heracles	0–3	Ajax	Almelo
CET (UTC+1)		Report	Neeskens 3'; Cruyff 30' van Dijk 75'	Stadium: Gemeentelijk Sportpark Bornsestaat; Attendance: 12,000; Referee: Jan Keizer

14 March 1971 Round of 16	Ajax	4–0	Den Bosch	Amsterdam
CET (UTC+1)	Cruyff 23' van Dijk 28', 32'; Mühren 43' (pen.)	Report		Stadium: De Meer Stadion; Attendance: 11,500; Referee: Ben Hoppenbrouwer

7 April 1971 Quarter-finals	Feyenoord	1–2	Ajax	Rotterdam
CET (UTC+1)	Jansen 19'	Report	Swart 70' van Dijk 88'	Stadium: De Kuip; Attendance: 64,634; Referee: Jan Keizer

21 April 1971 Semi-finals	Ajax	2–0	NEC	The Hague
CET (UTC+1)	Mühren 55' (pen.); Cruyff 90'	Report		Stadium: Sportpark Houtrust; Attendance: 28,000; Referee: Koen Brouwer Jr.

5 May 1971 Final	Ajax	2–2 (a.e.t.)	Sparta Rotterdam	Rotterdam
CET (UTC+1)	Cruyff 63', 80'	Report	Kowalik 40'; Visser 74'	Stadium: De Kuip; Attendance: 63,000; Referee: Laurens van Ravens

20 May 1971 Final Replay	Ajax	2–1	Sparta Rotterdam	Amsterdam
CET (UTC+1)	Mühren 4' (pen.); Neeskens 59'	Report	Walbeek 49'	Stadium: Olympisch Stadion; Attendance: 65,000; Referee: Laurens van Ravens

=== European Cup ===
==== First round ====
16 September 1970 First leg	17 Nëntori (Albania)	2–2	(Netherlands) Ajax	Qemal Stafa Stadium, Tirana
CET (UTC+1)	Kazanxhi 60'; Çeço 85'	Report	Suurbier 19', 58'	Attendance: 17,516; Referee: Paul Schiller (Austria)

30 September 1970 Second leg	Ajax (Netherlands)	2–0 (4–2 agg.)	(Albania) 17 Nëntori	Olympisch Stadion, Amsterdam
CET (UTC+1)	Keizer 7'; Swart 68'	Report		Attendance: 28,978; Referee: Christos Michas (Greece)

==== Second round ====
21 October 1970 First leg	Ajax (Netherlands)	3–0	(Switzerland) Basel	Olympisch Stadion, Amsterdam
CET (UTC+1)	Keizer 17' van Dijk 25'; Hulshoff 63'	Report		Attendance: 34,083; Referee: Petar Nikolov (Bulgaria)

4 November 1970 Second leg	Basel (Switzerland)	1–2 (1–5 agg.)	(Netherlands) Ajax	St. Jakob Stadium, Basel
CET (UTC+1)	Odermatt 36' (pen.)	Report	Rijnders 67'; Neeskens 71'	Attendance: 30,745; Referee: Dermot Barrett (Republic of Ireland)

==== Quarter-finals ====
10 March 1971 First leg	Ajax (Netherlands)	3–0	(Scotland) Celtic	Olympisch Stadion, Amsterdam
CET (UTC+1)	Cruyff 60'; Hulshoff 67'; Keizer 89'	Report		Attendance: 54,862; Referee: Antonio Saldanha (Portugal)

24 March 1971 Second leg	Celtic (Scotland)	1–0 (1–3 agg.)	(Netherlands) Ajax	Hampden Park, Glasgow
CET (UTC+1)	Johnstone 27'	Report		Attendance: 83,684; Referee: Concetto Lo Bello (Italy)

==== Semi-finals ====
14 April 1971 First leg	Atlético Madrid (Spain)	1–0	(Netherlands) Ajax	Estadio Manzanares, Madrid
CET (UTC+1)	Irureta 43'	Report		Attendance: 45,000; Referee: Gerhard Schulenburg (West Germany)

28 April 1971 Second leg	Ajax (Netherlands)	3–0 (3–1 agg.)	(Spain) Atlético Madrid	Olympisch Stadion, Amsterdam
CET (UTC+1)	Keizer 8'; Suurbier 76'; Neeskens 85'	Report		Attendance: 65,000; Referee: Antonio Sbardella (Italy)

==== Final ====
2 June 1971 Final	Ajax (Netherlands)	2–0	(Greece) Panathinaikos	Wembley Stadium, London
CET (UTC+1)	van Dijk 5'; Haan 87'	Report		Attendance: 83,179; Referee: Jack Taylor (England)

=== Appearances and goals ===
As of 2 November 2026

No.	Pos	Nat	Player	Total		Eredivisie		KNVB Cup		European Cup	
No.	Pos	Nat	Player	Apps	Goals	Apps	Goals	Apps	Goals	Apps	Goals
	GK	(Netherlands) NED	Stuy	49	0	34	0	6	0	9	0
	GK	(Netherlands) NED	Wever	1	0	1	0	0	0	0	0
	DF	(Serbia) SRB	Vasović	48	2	32+1	2	6	0	9	0
	DF	(Germany) GER	Blankenburg	22	0	6+7	0	3+2	0	2+2	0
	DF	(Netherlands) NED	Hulshoff	48	4	33	2	6	0	9	2
	DF	(Netherlands) NED	Krol	35	2	21+3	2	4	0	6+1	0
	DF	(Netherlands) NED	Suurbier	47	6	32	3	6	0	9	3
	MF	(Netherlands) NED	Haan	11	2	5+4	1	1	0	+1	1
	MF	(Netherlands) NED	Rijnders	47	3	31+1	2	5+1	0	9	1
	MF	(Netherlands) NED	Neeskens	48	4	33	0	4+2	2	9	2
	MF	(Netherlands) NED	Suurendonk	19	3	7+8	3	+2	0	2	0
	MF	(Netherlands) NED	Mühren	45	13	28+3	10	5+1	3	8	0
	FW	(Netherlands) NED	Cruyff	37	27	25	21	6	5	6	1
	FW	(Netherlands) NED	Keizer	46	13	32	9	5	0	9	4
	FW	(Netherlands) NED	Swart	45	18	30+1	16	5+1	1	8	1
	FW	(Netherlands) NED	van Dijk	40	24	24+5	18	4+1	4	4+2	2
