= Sjaak Swart =

Dutch footballer (born 1938)

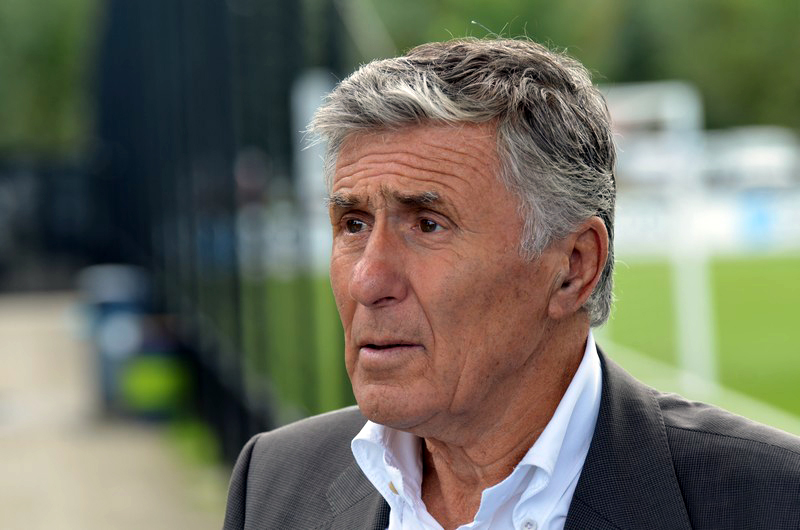
- Swart in 2011

Personal information
- Full name: Jesaia Swart
- Date of birth: 3 July 1938 (age 88)
- Place of birth: Muiderberg, Netherlands
- Height: 1.74 m (5 ft 9 in)
- Position: Right winger

Youth career
- OVVO
- De Zwarte Schapen
- 1948–1956: Ajax

Senior career*
Years	Team	Apps	(Gls)
1956–1973	Ajax	463	(174)

International career
1960–1972	Netherlands	31	(10)
- * Club domestic league appearances and goals

Jesaia "Sjaak" Swart (born 3 July 1938) is a Dutch former professional footballer who played as a right winger for Ajax and the Netherlands national team. Widely regarded as one of the club's greatest icons and a one-club man, he earned the enduring moniker Mister Ajax as he spent his entire 17-season professional senior career with Ajax between 1956 and 1973. He holds the club's all-time record for official competitive appearances with 603 matches and scored 227 goals across all competitions.

Swart was an indispensable component of Ajax's Total Football era during the late 1960s and early 1970s under managers Rinus Michels and Ștefan Kovács. Operating primarily on the right wing, he formed a celebrated attacking trident alongside Johan Cruyff and Piet Keizer. During his tenure, Ajax achieved unprecedented domestic and European success, winning eight Eredivisie championships, five KNVB Cups, three consecutive European Cup titles in 1971, 1972, and 1973, the 1972 Intercontinental Cup, and the 1972 European Super Cup.

== Early life ==
Swart was born in Muiderberg, a fishing village east of Amsterdam, the son of Louis Swart, an Ashkenazi Jewish fisherman and market merchant, and Catharina Cramer, a non-Jewish mother. His father sold herring from stalls at city street markets in Amsterdam.

During the Nazi occupation of the Netherlands in World War II, German occupying forces and local collaborationists initiated large-scale roundups that culminated in the murder of nearly 75 percent of the Dutch Jewish populace. Swart and his father evaded capture and deportation by concealing their Jewish background and moving between temporary hiding places throughout the occupation.

Following the liberation, the Swart family relocated to Amsterdam-Oost, settling in the Indische Buurt, where Swart first honed his skills playing street football on paved courtyards and squares. He began playing organised amateur football with local youth clubs OVVO and De Zwarte Schapen before earning an invitation to trial with AFC Ajax. In 1948, aged ten, he joined Ajax's youth setup, training at the club's wooden grandstand facilities adjacent to De Meer Stadion.

== Club career ==
=== AFC Ajax ===
==== Breakthrough and early domestic titles (1956–1965) ====
Swart with Ajax in 1966

Swart progressed through the youth ranks at Ajax and was promoted to the first-team squad ahead of the 1956–57 season. He made his senior competitive debut on 16 September 1956 in a 3–2 KNVB Cup victory against Stormvogels. A month later, on 14 October 1956, he made his Eredivisie debut against Willem II. Swart made five league appearances during his maiden campaign as Ajax captured the inaugural Eredivisie championship.

Under managers Jack Reynolds, Karl Humenberger, and subsequently Vic Buckingham, Swart secured a permanent place in the starting line-up on the right wing. In the 1959–60 Eredivisie season, he emerged as one of the league's most prolific forwards, scoring 18 goals in 29 regular-season appearances. He added another four goals in five post-season play-off matches to help Ajax capture the league title after defeating Feyenoord in a championship decider. The following season, Swart won his first domestic cup competition, appearing throughout Ajax's victorious 1960–61 KNVB Cup campaign. He also featured prominently in the international 1961–62 Intertoto Cup, which Ajax won by defeating Feyenoord 4–2 in the final.

==== Total Football and European dominance (1965–1973) ====
In January 1965, Rinus Michels was appointed head coach of Ajax, initiating a tactical overhaul toward full professionalism and pioneering the tactical philosophy of Total Football. In Michels's fluid 4–3–3 formation, Swart functioned as an energetic, technically gifted right winger opposite left-sided playmaker Piet Keizer, with the young Johan Cruyff operating as a free-roaming centre forward. The front three formed one of the most prolific attacking partnerships in European football history.

In the 1966–67 Eredivisie season, Ajax scored a league-record 122 goals, with Swart netting a career-high 23 league goals in 34 matches to help Ajax secure the domestic league and cup double. During this era, Swart also developed a reputation for scoring decisive goals in the dying minutes of fixtures, earning the popular moniker Sjakie Vijf Minuten voor Tijd ("Sjakie Five Minutes Before Time").

Swart (centre) alongside manager Rinus Michels (left) and Johan Cruyff (right) arriving at Schiphol following a European Cup tie in Lisbon, February 1969

Swart started in Ajax's first continental final, the 1969 European Cup Final in Madrid, which ended in a 4–1 defeat to AC Milan. Two years later, he reached the pinnacle of European club football, starting on the right wing in the 1971 European Cup Final at Wembley Stadium as Ajax defeated Panathinaikos 2–0 to claim their first European Cup title.

Swart (right) and Cruyff (left) departing for a European Cup tie against 17 Nëntori, September 1970

Under Romanian manager Ștefan Kovács, who succeeded Michels in 1971, Ajax reached their tactical zenith. In the 1971–72 campaign, Swart was an integral part of the team that completed the continental treble. Ajax retained the Eredivisie title, won the KNVB Cup, and defended their continental crown by defeating Inter Milan 2–0 in the 1972 European Cup Final at De Kuip in Rotterdam. In the European Cup semi-finals against Benfica, Swart scored the decisive header in Amsterdam to secure a 1–0 aggregate victory. He then played both legs of the 1972 Intercontinental Cup against Argentine club Independiente, helping Ajax win the world club title 4–1 on aggregate.

Swart collected a third consecutive European Cup winners' medal in the 1973 European Cup Final in Belgrade, coming on as a substitute in a 1–0 victory over Juventus. Following the 1972–73 season, Swart announced his retirement from professional football at the age of 35.

Swart holding flowers and his daughter alongside Johan Neeskens at his farewell testimonial at the Olympic Stadium, 8 August 1973

In total, Swart completed 603 official appearances for Ajax over 17 consecutive seasons, establishing an all-time club record that remains unbroken. On 8 August 1973, Ajax organised an official farewell testimonial match in his honour at the Olympic Stadium, where Ajax defeated English side Tottenham Hotspur F.C. before an estimated 50,000 spectators.

== International career ==
Swart represented the Netherlands national football team between 1960 and 1972, earning 31 international caps and scoring ten goals.

He made his senior debut for the Oranje on 26 June 1960 in an exhibition match against Mexico in Mexico City, which resulted in a 3–1 defeat. A week later, on his 22nd birthday on 3 July 1960, Swart scored his first international goal in a 4–3 victory over Suriname in Paramaribo. He scored four goals in six international fixtures in 1962, including a brace in an 8–0 friendly win over the Netherlands Antilles and a goal in a 3–1 European Nations' Cup preliminary win against Switzerland.

Swart appeared regularly during the qualification stages for the 1962 FIFA World Cup, the 1966 FIFA World Cup, and UEFA Euro 1968, though the national side fell short of qualifying for the tournament finals during this period. He scored his final international goal on 1 November 1967 in a 2–1 friendly defeat against Yugoslavia in Rotterdam. Swart earned his 31st and final cap on 30 August 1972 in a 2–1 friendly victory against Czechoslovakia in Prague.

== Style of play ==
Swart was recognized as an archetypal Dutch right winger, renowned for his bursts of acceleration, close ball control, and passing accuracy. While proficient in delivering whipped crosses from the byline, he also distinguished himself by drifting inside into central spaces to link up with Johan Cruyff or attacking the far post to finish crosses floated by opposite winger Piet Keizer.

Within the tactical construct of Total Football, Swart was lauded for his defensive discipline, high work rate, and spatial intelligence. He frequently tracked opposing full-backs and covered defensive space on the right flank when right-back Wim Suurbier overlapped into attack. Although occasionally overshadowed in international memory by the star power of Cruyff and Keizer, his tactical consistency and goal output were considered fundamental to the stability and execution of Ajax's tactical framework.

== Personal life and post-retirement ==
Swart and his bride Andrea Sweers receiving flowers from a young Ajax club member on their wedding day, 10 October 1961

Swart married Andrea Sweers on 10 October 1961 in Amsterdam. The couple settled in Amsterdam, where they raised two daughters. Following his playing career, Swart also operated a cigar store and worked as a player agent.

Swart remained an active ambassador and cultural icon for Ajax throughout his retirement. He played hundreds of exhibition matches for the veterans' team Lucky Ajax and regularly attended training sessions and academy fixtures at Ajax's youth complex, Sportpark De Toekomst.

In September 2026, to celebrate his lifelong dedication to the club and youth development, the Supportersvereniging Ajax (Ajax Supporters Association) named the permanent viewing balcony at De Toekomst—where Swart historically watched youth and reserve matches—the Sjaak Swart Balkon. During the ceremony, an art plaque by street artist Frankey was unveiled, and Swart was named the association's eleventh honorary member.

== Career statistics ==
=== Club ===
Appearances and goals by club, season and competition
Club	Season	League			Cup (Note: Includes appearances in the KNVB Cup)		Europe		Other		Total	
Club	Season	Division	Apps	Goals	Apps	Goals	Apps	Goals	Apps	Goals	Apps	Goals
Ajax	1956–57	Eredivisie	5	0	1	0	0	0	0	0	6	0
Ajax	1957–58	Eredivisie	19	4	0	0	2 (Note: Appearances in the European Cup)	0	0	0	21	4
Ajax	1958–59	Eredivisie	7	3	5	4	0	0	0	0	12	7
Ajax	1959–60	Eredivisie	29	18	0	0	0	0	5 (Note: Appearances in Dutch European play-offs)	4	34	22
Ajax	1960–61	Eredivisie	33	9	7	3	2	1	0	0	42	13
Ajax	1961–62	Eredivisie	33	5	2	1	10 (Note: Eight appearances and three goals in Intertoto Cup; two appearances and one goal in UEFA Cup Winners' Cup)	4	0	0	45	10
Ajax	1962–63	Eredivisie	28	5	2	0	3 (Note: Appearances in Intertoto Cup)	2	0	0	33	7
Ajax	1963–64	Eredivisie	30	12	5	0	1	0	0	0	36	12
Ajax	1964–65	Eredivisie	29	11	1	0	0	0	0	0	30	11
Ajax	1965–66	Eredivisie	30	10	5	3	0	0	0	0	35	13
Ajax	1966–67	Eredivisie	34	23	5	3	6	3	0	0	45	29
Ajax	1967–68	Eredivisie	33	12	7	2	2	0	0	0	42	14
Ajax	1968–69	Eredivisie	32	13	3	2	14 (Note: Ten appearances and three goals in European Cup; four appearances and two goals in Intertoto Cup)	5	0	0	49	20
Ajax	1969–70	Eredivisie	31	13	6	1	10 (Note: Appearances in Inter-Cities Fairs Cup)	6	0	0	47	20
Ajax	1970–71	Eredivisie	31	16	6	1	8	1	0	0	45	18
Ajax	1971–72	Eredivisie	33	11	5	3	9	3	0	0	47	17
Ajax	1972–73	Eredivisie	26	9	1	0	3	1	4 (Note: Two appearances in European Super Cup; two appearances in Intercontinental Cup)	0	34	10
Career total			463	174	61	23	70	26	9	4	603	227

=== International ===
Appearances and goals by national team and year
National team	Year	Apps	Goals
Netherlands	1960	3	1
Netherlands	1961	4	1
Netherlands	1962	6	4
Netherlands	1963	5	0
Netherlands	1964	0	0
Netherlands	1965	1	0
Netherlands	1966	5	3
Netherlands	1967	3	1
Netherlands	1968	3	0
Netherlands	1969	0	0
Netherlands	1970	0	0
Netherlands	1971	0	0
Netherlands	1972	1	0
Total		31	10

Scores and results list the Netherlands' goal tally first, score column indicates score after each Swart goal.

List of international goals scored by Sjaak Swart
No.	Date	Venue	Opponent	Score	Result	Competition
1	3 July 1960	Suriname Stadium, Paramaribo, Suriname	Suriname	1–0	4–3	Friendly
2	22 March 1961	De Kuip, Rotterdam, Netherlands	Belgium	4–2	6–2	Friendly
3	9 May 1962	De Kuip, Rotterdam, Netherlands	Northern Ireland	1–0	4–0	Friendly
4	5 September 1962	Olympic Stadium, Amsterdam, Netherlands	Netherlands Antilles	5–0	8–0	Friendly
5	5 September 1962	Olympic Stadium, Amsterdam, Netherlands	Netherlands Antilles	6–0	8–0	Friendly
6	11 November 1962	Olympic Stadium, Amsterdam, Netherlands	Switzerland	2–1	3–1	UEFA Euro 1964 qualification
7	23 March 1966	De Kuip, Rotterdam, Netherlands	West Germany	1–2	2–4	Friendly
8	6 November 1966	Olympic Stadium, Amsterdam, Netherlands	Czechoslovakia	1–1	1–2	Friendly
9	30 November 1966	De Kuip, Rotterdam, Netherlands	Denmark	1–0	2–0	UEFA Euro 1968 qualification
10	1 November 1967	De Kuip, Rotterdam, Netherlands	Yugoslavia	1–0	1–2	Friendly

== Honours ==
Ajax

- Eredivisie (8): 1956–57, 1959–60, 1965–66, 1966–67, 1967–68, 1969–70, 1971–72, 1972–73
- KNVB Cup: 1960–61, 1966–67, 1969–70, 1970–71, 1971–72; runner-up: 1967–68
- European Cup: 1970–71, 1971–72, 1972–73; runner-up: 1968–69
- Intertoto Cup: 1961–62
- European Super Cup: 1972
- Intercontinental Cup: 1972

Individual

- Knight of the Order of Orange-Nassau (Ridder in de Orde van Oranje-Nassau): 27 April 1972
- Bondsridder of the KNVB: 8 August 1973
- Honorary Citizen of Amsterdam: 3 July 1988
- Honorary Member of AFC Ajax: 21 January 2010
- Honorary Member of Supportersvereniging Ajax: 15 September 2026

== See also ==
- List of one-club men in association football
- List of Jewish footballers
- Bennie Muller
