= Dick van Dijk =

Dutch footballer (1946–1997)

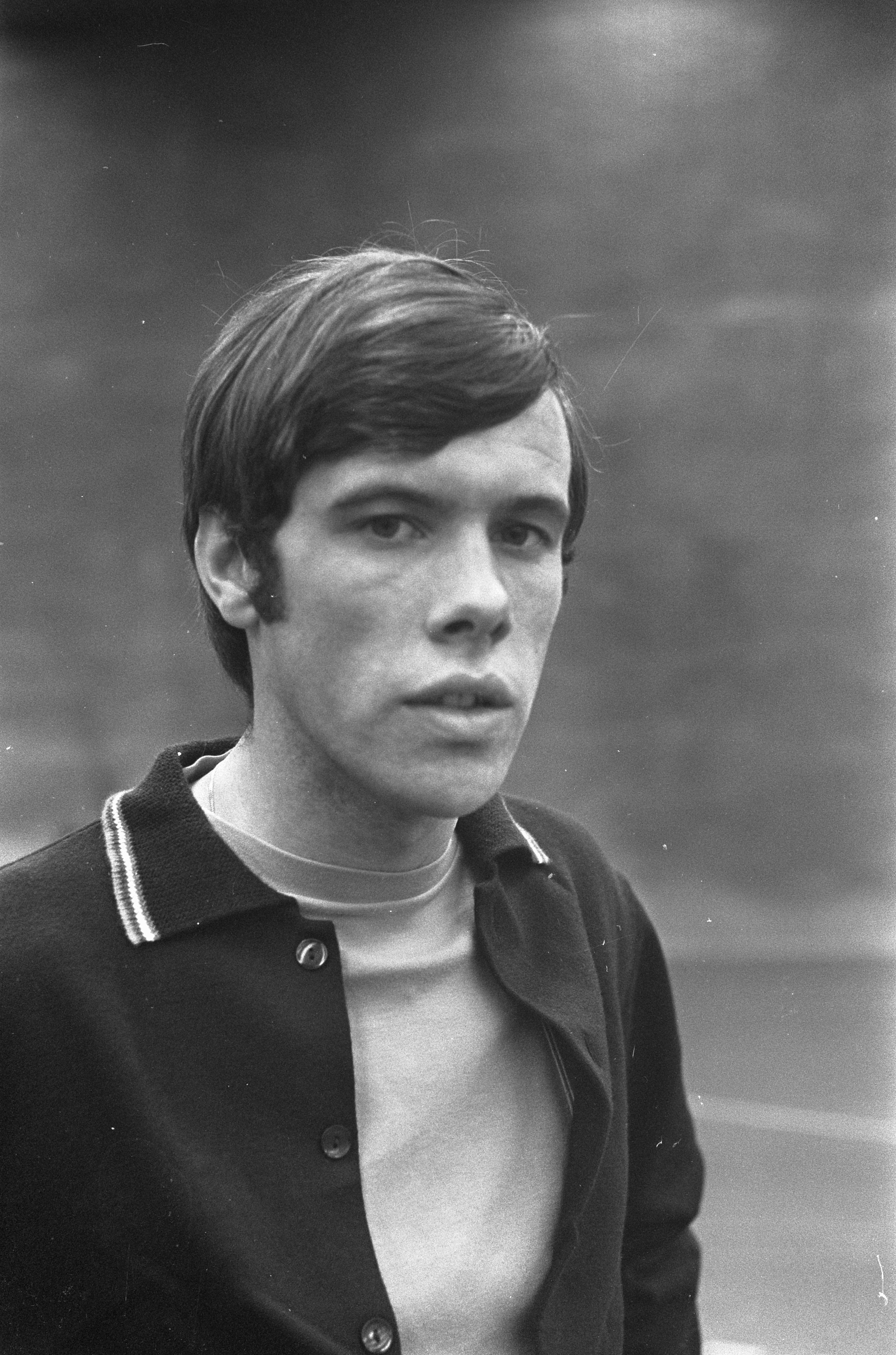
- Van Dijk in 1969

Personal information
- Full name: Dirk Wouter Johannes van Dijk
- Date of birth: 15 February 1946
- Place of birth: Gouda, Netherlands
- Date of death: 8 July 1997 (aged 51)
- Place of death: Nice, France
- Height: 1.86 m (6 ft 1 in)
- Position: Striker

Youth career
- 1960–1966: ONA

Senior career*
Years	Team	Apps	(Gls)
1963–1967	SVV	112	(62)
1967–1969	Twente	65	(52)
1969–1972	Ajax	84	(57)
1972–1974	Nice	58	(30)
1974–1975	Real Murcia	19	(4)
Total		338	(205)

International career^{‡}
1969–1971	Netherlands	7	(1)
- * Club domestic league appearances and goals as of 14 December 2006 ‡ National team caps and goals as of 14 December 2006

Dirk Wouter Johannes "Dick" van Dijk (15 February 1946 – 8 July 1997) was a Dutch professional footballer who played as a forward for FC Twente and Ajax Amsterdam. He was a member of Ajax's European Cup victory in 1971. He earned seven caps for the Netherlands national football team.

== Club career ==
Dick van Dijk grew up in Gouda and played football in his youth at local amateur club ONA. When he was sixteen, he met coach Hans Croon of SVV, with whom he played in the Second division. Van Dijk was the top scorer for the club in 1966 when SVV won promotion to the First Division, thanks to van Dijk scoring a hattrick against NOAD. He was invited to the Dutch youth team and the Dutch military team. The scoring ability of the young star attracted the interest of FC Twente, but the asking price of 200,000 guilders was too much. A less impressive season ensured that the transfer fee a year later had dropped to 70,000 guilders, with Van Dijk joining FC Twente in the summer of 1967.

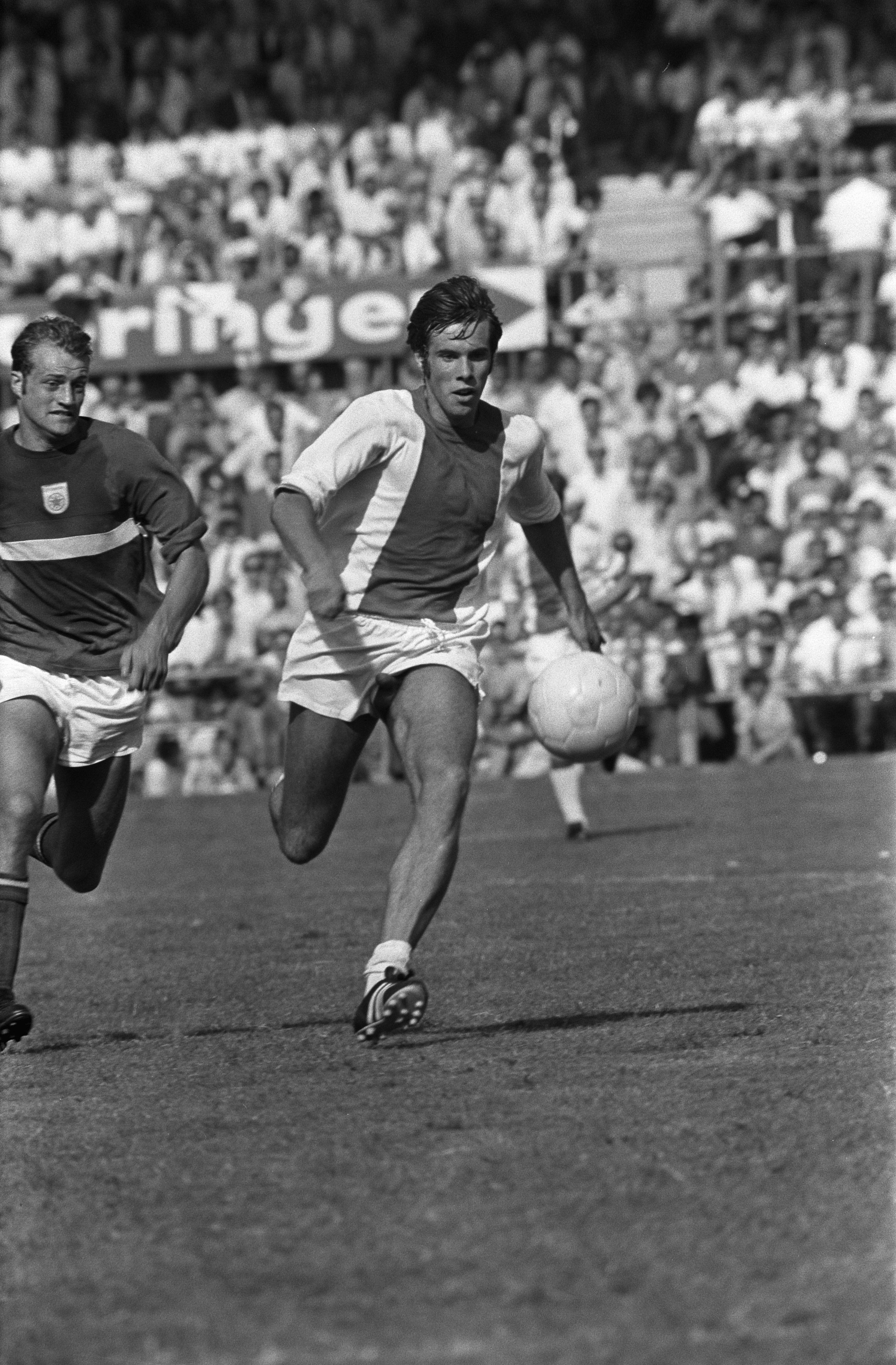
Van Dijk in 1969

At Twente, Van Dijk formed a strong attacking partnership with Theo Pahlplatz, scoring 22 times and helping a youthful side to a creditable eighth-place finish in his first season. The following year Van Dijk finished as top scorer in the Premier League with 30 goals. In a legendary home match against Ajax on 3 November 1968, Twente won 5–1 and Van Dijk scored three goals. It is believed that this contest sparked the interest of Ajax in Van Dijk, who in June 1969 moved to Amsterdam for a transfer fee of 750,000 guilders.

While Van Dijk had been a star player at Twente, he had to fight for a spot at Ajax, becoming as a result a more complete footballer who knew how to defend. In his first season, he scored 23 goals in 32 matches. Although not a regular starter during his second season, he nonetheless scored 18 goals in 29 matches. Van Dijk started in the final of the European Cup in June 1971 against Panathinaikos, scoring with a header after five minutes in Ajax's 2–0 victory.

After a third season at Ajax, where he was mainly a reserve player, Van Dijk departed in 1972 to OGC Nice in France. There he scored frequently, helping the team to a second-place finish in 1972–73 season. On 19 September 1973, Nice achieved a remarkable 3–0 victory in the first leg of their UEFA Cup tie with FC Barcelona, whose coach was Dutchman Rinus Michels and whose star player (although he did not figure in the match) was Johan Cruijff. (Nice would go on to win the tie 3–2 on aggregate.) In 1974, Van Dijk joined Real Murcia in Spain, and a year later ended his football career.

== International career ==
Meanwhile, Van Dijk had made his international debut on 26 March 1969 in a match for the Dutch national team against Luxembourg. Van Dijk scored once in a 4–0 victory.

On 10 October 1971 Van Dijk played his seventh and final international match against East Germany.

== Personal life ==
He was married to Wanda Kerbaum (died in 2012) and they had a daughter, Anouk (died in 2011). After his playing career, he went back to Nice, working as a broker and living in nearby Saint-Paul-de-Vence.

=== Death ===
In 1997, he died suddenly at 51 years of age from acute endocarditis, a bacterial infection of the heart valves. In his memory, a benefit match was organized on 12 October 1997 between ONA Gouda and the Ajax of the Europe Cup I-finals from 1971. In May 2017, 20 years after his death, another matched was staged in his memory between former Ajax players and Nice.

== Honours ==
=== Club ===
Ajax

- Eredivisie: 1969–70, 1971–72
- KNVB Cup: 1970–71, 1971–72
- European Cup: 1970–71, 1971–72

=== Individual ===
- Eredivisie top scorer: 1968–69
