= Arnold Mühren =

Dutch footballer and manager (born 1951)

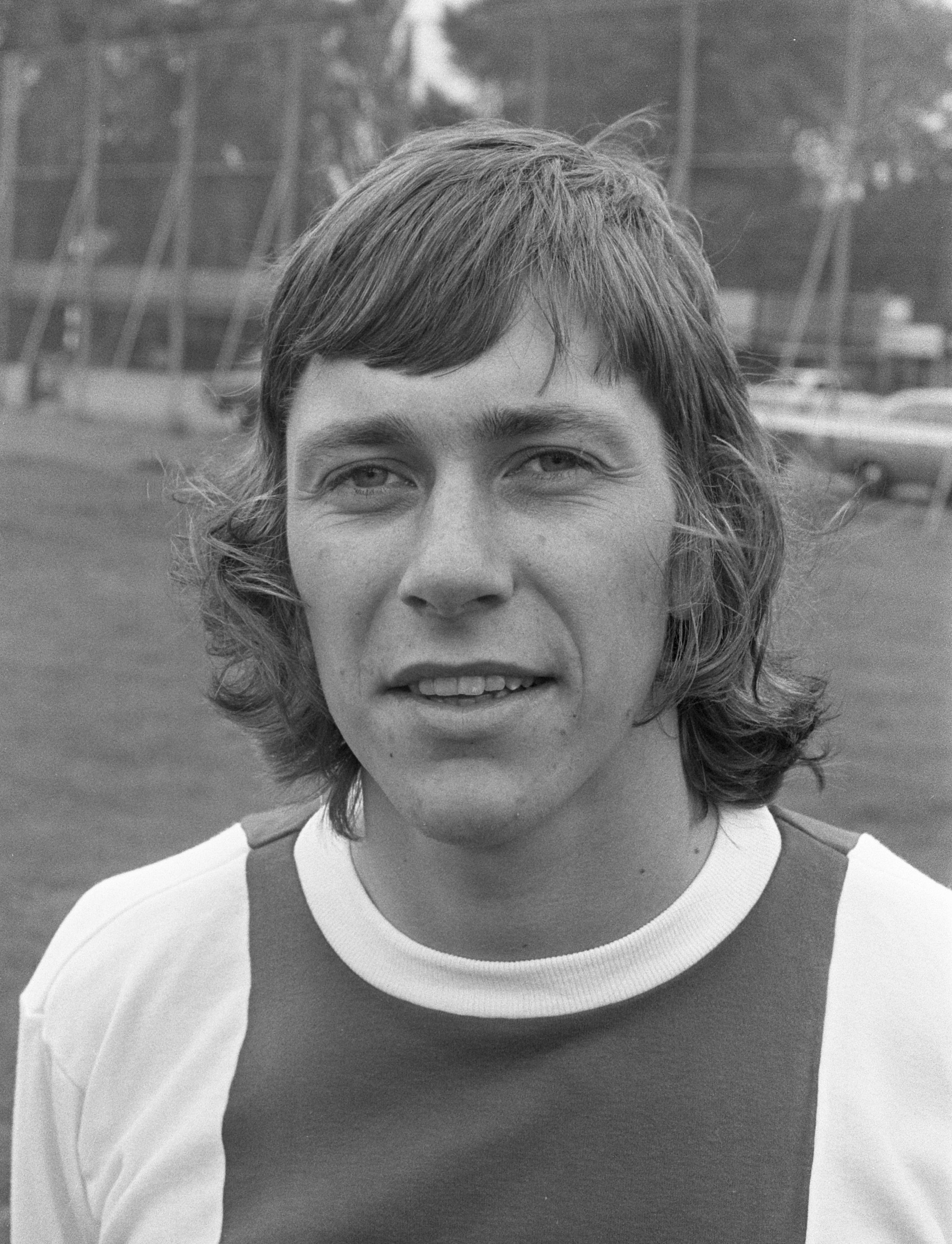
- Mühren in 1972

Personal information
- Full name: Arnold Johannes Hyacinthus Mühren
- Date of birth: 2 June 1951 (age 75)
- Place of birth: Volendam, North Holland, Netherlands
- Height: 1.78 m (5 ft 10 in)
- Position: Midfielder

Senior career*
Years	Team	Apps	(Gls)
1970–1971	Volendam	27	(2)
1971–1974	Ajax	57	(16)
1974–1978	Twente	108	(39)
1978–1982	Ipswich Town	161	(21)
1982–1985	Manchester United	70	(13)
1985–1989	Ajax	99	(14)
Total		522	(105)

International career
1978–1988	Netherlands	23	(3)

Managerial career
- Volendam (youth coach)
- Ajax (youth coach)
Medal record
Representing Netherlands
UEFA European Championship
Winner	1988 West Germany
- * Club domestic league appearances and goals

Arnold Johannes Hyacinthus Mühren (born 2 June 1951) is a Dutch football manager and former midfielder. His older brother Gerrie, also a midfielder, won three European Cup titles with Ajax in the early 1970s. Mühren is among the few players to have won all three major UEFA-organised club competitions, the European Cup (1971–72 and 1972–73), the Cup Winners' Cup (1986–87) and the UEFA Cup (1980–81). The last of these was won with Ipswich Town, while the other titles were won while playing for Ajax. He is also one of the two Dutch players, together with Danny Blind, to have won three different UEFA club competitions.

== Early life and playing career ==
Arnold Mühren was born on 2 June 1951 in Volendam, North Holland. He started his career at FC Volendam. He moved to Ajax Amsterdam in 1971, winning three domestic and three international titles in his first two seasons there. His third season with Ajax yielded no titles, but he found further success after a transfer to FC Twente, winning the KNVB Cup in 1977 and reaching the 1975 UEFA Cup Final. A year later he moved to Ipswich Town in England for a fee of £150,000.

Mühren was part of the successful Ipswich team that won the 1981 UEFA Cup, and finished second in the league that year and the season after. In 1982, he transferred to Manchester United. He helped United win the 1983 FA Cup Final by scoring a penalty in the replay against Brighton, and left the club after the 1985 FA Cup Final, in which United defeated Everton. He did not feature in the match squad for the 1985 final, having lost his place in the team that season to new signing Jesper Olsen. Mühren was one of the few players from outside the United Kingdom and Ireland playing in English football during the late 1970s and early 1980s.

After seven years in England, Mühren returned to Ajax, where he added the European Cup Winners' Cup (1986–87) to his trophy collection. Mühren also reached the final the following year in 1988 but lost to KV Mechelen. Mühren continued playing for Ajax for one more season after that, before retiring in 1989 at the age of 38.

== International career ==
Mühren made his international debut in 1978 in a 4–0 win against Tunisia.

At the age of 37, he achieved the highlight of his career, when he was a vital part of the Netherlands national team that won the European Championships in 1988. In the final against the Soviet Union he provided the cross from which Marco van Basten scored the second goal which is considered one of the greatest volleyed goals of all time.

== Career statistics ==
=== International ===
Appearances and goals by national team and year
National team	Year	Apps	Goals
Netherlands	1978	1	0
Netherlands	1979	0	0
Netherlands	1980	0	0
Netherlands	1981	5	2
Netherlands	1982	2	0
Netherlands	1983	0	0
Netherlands	1984	0	0
Netherlands	1985	0	0
Netherlands	1986	1	0
Netherlands	1987	6	1
Netherlands	1988	8	0
Total		23	3

Scores and results list the Netherlands' goal tally first, score column indicates score after each Mühren goal.

List of international goals scored by Arnold Mühren
No.	Date	Venue	Opponent	Score	Result	Competition
1	25 March 1981	Rotterdam, Netherlands	France	1–0	1–0	1982 FIFA World Cup qualification
2	9 September 1981	Rotterdam, Netherlands	Republic of Ireland	2–1	2–2	1982 FIFA World Cup qualification
3	29 April 1987	Rotterdam, Netherlands	Hungary	2–0	2–0	UEFA Euro 1988 qualification

== Honours ==
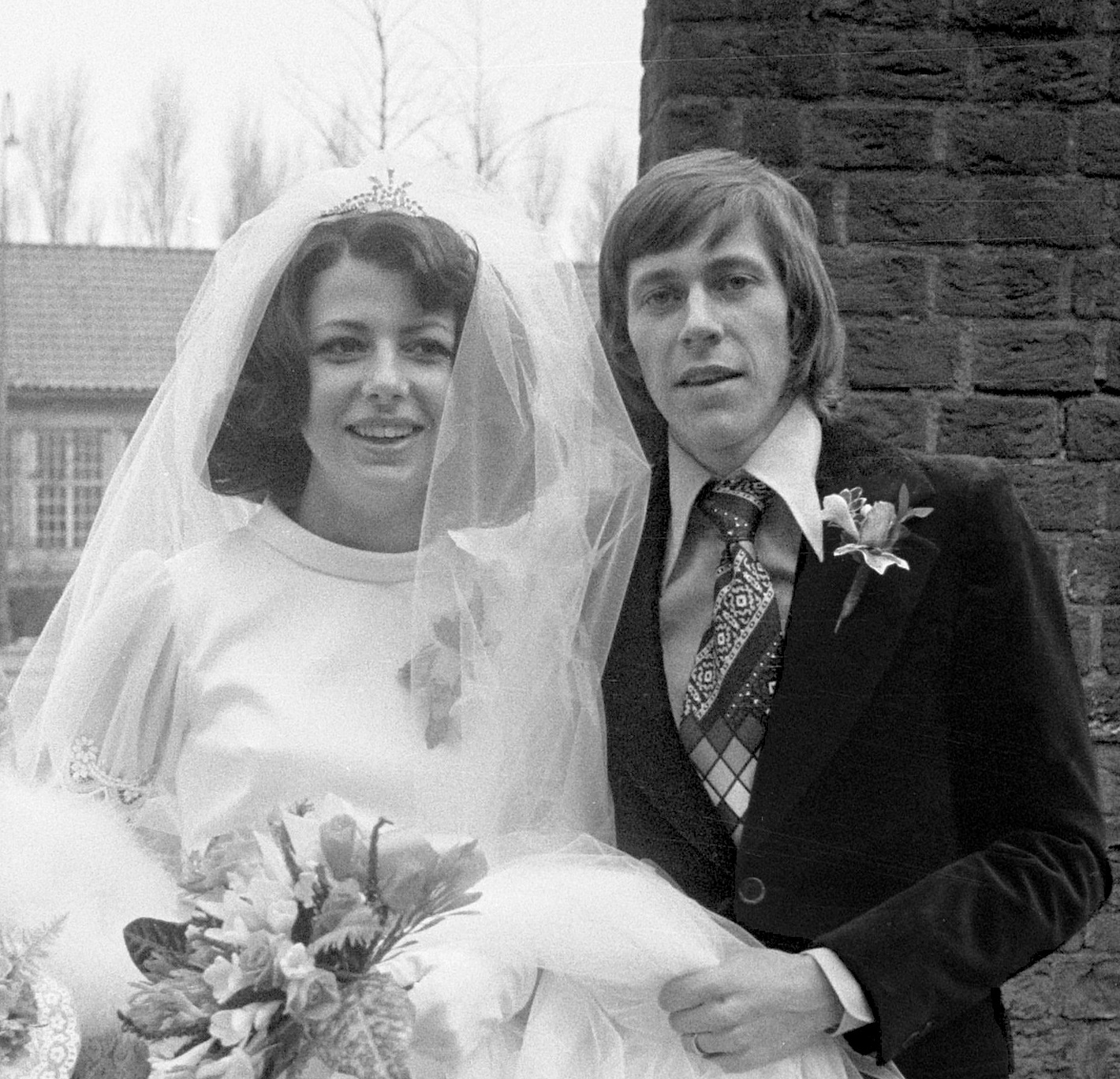
Arnold Mühren and Gerrie Kroon getting married on 12 March 1974

Ajax

- Eredivisie: 1971–72, 1972–73
- KNVB Cup: 1971–72, 1985–86, 1986–87
- European Cup: 1971–72, 1972–73
- European Cup Winners' Cup: 1986–87, runner-up 1987–88
- European Super Cup: 1973
- Intercontinental Cup: 1972

Twente

- KNVB Cup: 1976–77

Ipswich Town

- UEFA Cup: 1980–81

Manchester United

- FA Cup: 1982–83, 1984–85
- FA Charity Shield: 1983
- Football League Cup runner-up: 1982–83

Netherlands

- UEFA European Championship: 1988

Individual

- Ipswich Town Player of the Year: 1978–79
- Ipswich Town Hall of Fame: Inducted 2009

== See also ==
- List of European association football families
- List of players to have won all international club competitions
- List of players to have won the three main European club competitions
