= 1970–71 Tweede Divisie =

Tweede Divisie
- Season: 1970–71
- Champions: De Volewijckers
- Promoted: 6 teams
- Relegated: 11 teams
- Goals: 705
- Average goals/game: 2.59

The Dutch 1970–71 Tweede Divisie football season was contested by 17 teams. The Tweede Divisie league was disbanded after this season, so eleven teams returned to amateur football (either forced or on a voluntary basis). De Volewijckers were the last champions and they were promoted to the Eerste Divisie along with five other teams.

== New entrants ==
Relegated from the Eerste Divisie:

- De Volewijckers
- RCH
- Fortuna Vlaardingen

== League standings ==
Pos	Team	Pld	W	D	L	GF	GA	GD	Pts	Promotion or relegation
1	De Volewijckers	32	20	7	5	65	31	+34	47	Promoted to Eerste Divisie
2	PEC	32	17	11	4	70	36	+34	45	Promoted to Eerste Divisie
3	FC Eindhoven	32	17	11	4	45	19	+26	45	Promoted to Eerste Divisie
4	Hermes DVS	32	17	6	9	51	29	+22	40	Relegated to amateur football
5	Roda JC	32	12	15	5	34	27	+7	39	Promoted to Eerste Divisie
6	SC Gooiland	32	11	11	10	41	43	−2	33	Relegated to amateur football
7	Fortuna Vlaardingen	32	13	7	12	39	42	−3	33	Promoted to Eerste Divisie
8	TSV NOAD	32	10	12	10	44	43	+1	32	Relegated to amateur football
9	AGOVV Apeldoorn	32	12	8	12	35	41	−6	32	Relegated to amateur football
10	ZFC	32	9	12	11	42	42	0	30	Relegated to amateur football
11	VVV-Venlo	32	11	8	13	42	46	−4	30	Promoted to Eerste Divisie
12	RCH	32	8	13	11	42	40	+2	29	Relegated to amateur football
13	SV Limburgia	32	7	14	11	31	39	−8	28	Relegated to amateur football
14	VV Baronie	32	7	10	15	38	56	−18	24	Relegated to amateur football
15	RBC Roosendaal	32	5	13	14	32	57	−25	23	Relegated to amateur football
16	HFC EDO	32	6	7	19	28	59	−31	19	Relegated to amateur football
17	SC Drente	32	3	9	20	26	55	−29	15	Relegated to amateur football

Source: rsssf.com

== See also ==
- 1970–71 Eredivisie
- 1970–71 Eerste Divisie
- 1970–71 KNVB Cup
