= Wim Suurbier =

Dutch footballer (1945–2020)

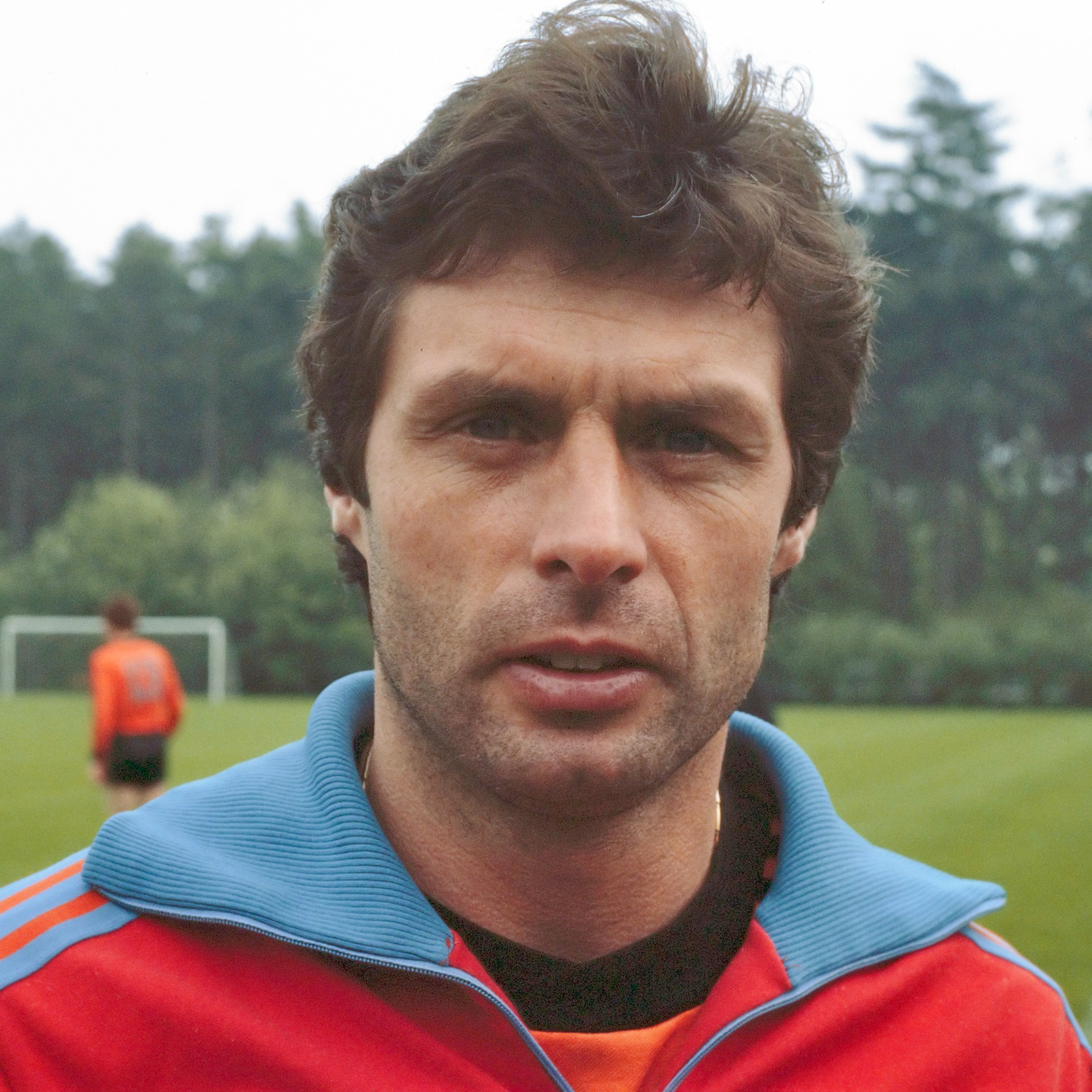
- Suurbier in 1978

Personal information
- Full name: Wilhelmus Lourens Johannes Suurbier
- Date of birth: 16 January 1945
- Place of birth: Eindhoven, Netherlands
- Date of death: 12 July 2020 (aged 75)
- Place of death: Amsterdam, Netherlands
- Height: 1.81 m (5 ft 11 in)
- Position: Right back

Youth career
- Ajax

Senior career*
Years	Team	Apps	(Gls)
1964–1977	Ajax	393	(16)
1977–1978	Schalke 04	12	(0)
1978–1979	Metz	24	(0)
1979–1981	Los Angeles Aztecs	73	(3)
1980–1981	→ Sparta Rotterdam (loan)	11	(1)
1982	Tung Sing	4	(0)
1982	San Jose Earthquakes	23	(0)
Total		539	(20)

International career
1966–1978	Netherlands	60	(3)

Managerial career
- 1983: Golden Bay Earthquakes (assistant)
- 1984: Tulsa Roughnecks
- 1986: Los Angeles Heat
- 1986–1987: Tampa Bay Rowdies
- 1988: Fort Lauderdale Strikers
- 1989: Miami Sharks
- 1994: St. Petersburg Kickers
- 2017: Kerala Blasters (assistant)
Medal record
Men's football
Representing Netherlands
FIFA World Cup
Runner-up	1974 West Germany
Runner-up	1978 Argentina
European Championship
Third place	1976 Yugoslavia
- * Club domestic league appearances and goals

Wilhelmus Lourens Johannes Suurbier (Dutch pronunciation: [ʋɪm ˈsyːrbiːr]; 16 January 1945 – 12 July 2020) was a Dutch professional footballer. He played as a right back and was part of the Netherlands national team and AFC Ajax teams of the 1970s.

== Club career ==
Suurbier was born in Eindhoven, but moved to Amsterdam with his family at a young age. He made his debut for Ajax Amsterdam when he was 19 and played with them for 13 years, all throughout the most successful era until 1977 when he was 32 years old. He played more than 500 official matches for Ajax and is part of the informal Club van 100 at the club. Usually a right back, Suurbier was renowned for his pace and stamina. Suurbier was a big part of the 70's "total football" team the "Twelve Apostles" of Ajax Amsterdam led by Johan Cruijff, which lifted the UEFA European Cup three times in a row. In 1977, he moved to FC Schalke 04 for one season.

In 1979, Suurbier transferred to the Los Angeles Aztecs of the North American Soccer League, where he played three seasons. The club allowed him to play for Sparta in the 1980-81 Eredivisie, during the off-season for the American team. He moved back to the Aztecs in April 1981, having played 11 league matches for Sparta.

In early 1982, Suurbier moved to Hong Kong, first to play several test matches for Seiko, but ended up playing a handful of matches at Tung Sing FC. Just after a few months in Hong Kong, he moved to the San Jose Earthquakes for the 1982 season. In the fall of 1982, the team was renamed the Golden Bay Earthquakes and entered the Major Indoor Soccer League. He retired at the end of the season to become an assistant coach with the Earthquakes. He later resumed his playing career as a player-coach of the Tampa Bay Rowdies in the American Indoor Soccer Association. He finally quit his career in 1987 due to a knee injury.

== International career ==
Suurbier played 60 matches and scored three goals for the Netherlands national team from 1966 to 1978. He played in both the 1974 and 1978 World Cups where the Dutch finished second, and also the 1976 UEFA European Football Championship.

== Managerial career ==
In 1983, Suurbier was an assistant coach with the Golden Bay Earthquakes. In 1984, the Tulsa Roughnecks of the North American Soccer League hired Suurbier as head coach. He took the team to a 10–14 record. In 1986, he became the head coach of the Los Angeles Heat of the Western Soccer League. In the fall of 1986, he was hired by the Tampa Bay Rowdies as the team entered the American Indoor Soccer Association. In November 1987, Suurbier became the head coach of the newly established Fort Lauderdale Strikers in preparation of the team's first season in 1988. That season, the Strikers finished and went to the American Soccer League championship before falling to the Washington Diplomats. In January 1989, Suurbier resigned as coach of the Strikers. In February 1989, he was named the new head coach of the Miami Sharks. After starting the season at 2–3, the Sharks fired Suurbier. In 1994, he became the head coach of the St. Petersburg Kickers. In 1999 Suurbier joined Al Etehad (Qatar) as an assistant coach to Rene Meulensteen. Together they won the Arab Cup and H.H. Apparent Cup that season. The year after they joined Al Sadd (Qatar) and in season 2000–01 they won the Emir cup. From 2001 to 2002 Suurbier worked for Heerenveen as an assistant for the U-20 squad. In 2017, he was a part of the coaching staff for the pre-season preparations of the Indian Super League club Kerala Blasters in Spain, where he served as a mentor to the Blasters' head coach René Meulensteen during the preseason.

== Personal life ==
Suurbier married Maya Verkaart in 1967 and divorced in the 1980s; he had one daughter from this marriage.

When playing in the United States, Suurbier befriended George Best, and called Best's lifestyle a "bit boring".

Suurbier was known for his humor and practical jokes, most notably during the 1974 FIFA World Cup when he and Ruud Krol (nicknamed Snabbel and Babbel) kept making fun of Ruud Geels, much to the frustration of the latter.

In May 2020, it was reported that Suurbier was in intensive care after having suffered a "major" intracerebral haemorrhage. He died on 12 July 2020.

== Career statistics ==
=== Club ===
Appearances and goals by club and season
Club	Season	League			National cup (Note: Appearances in KNVB Cup, DFB-Pokal and Coupe de France)		Continental		Other		Total	
Club	Season	Division	Apps	Goals	Apps	Goals	Apps	Goals	Apps	Goals	Apps	Goals
Ajax	1963–64	Eredivisie	2	0	1	0	–		–		3	0
Ajax	1964–65	Eredivisie	24	0	–		–		–		24	0
Ajax	1965–66	Eredivisie	28	1	5	0	–		–		33	1
Ajax	1966–67	Eredivisie	32	0	5	0	5 (Note: Appearances in European Cup)	0	–		42	0
Ajax	1967–68	Eredivisie	32	2	4	0	2	0	–		38	2
Ajax	1968–69	Eredivisie	24	0	2	0	11 (Note: Appearances in European Cup and Intertoto Cup)	0	–		37	0
Ajax	1969–70	Eredivisie	34	2	6	0	10 (Note: Appearances in Inter-Cities Fairs Cup)	0	–		50	2
Ajax	1970–71	Eredivisie	32	3	6	0	9	3	–		47	6
Ajax	1971–72	Eredivisie	25	1	5	0	6	0	–		36	1
Ajax	1972–73	Eredivisie	33	0	1	0	7	0	4 (Note: Two appearances in European Super Cup, two appearances in Intercontinental Cup)	0	45	0
Ajax	1973–74	Eredivisie	34	5	4	0	2	0	2 (Note: Two appearances in European Super Cup)	–	42	5
Ajax	1974–75	Eredivisie	29	0	–		4 (Note: Appearances in UEFA Cup)	0	2 (Note: Appearances in Dutch playoffs to qualify for European football 1975)	0	35	0
Ajax	1975–76	Eredivisie	32	2	3	0	6	0	–		41	2
Ajax	1976–77	Eredivisie	22	0	1	0	–		–		23	0
Ajax	1977–78	Eredivisie	10	0	–		3	0	–		13	0
Ajax	Total		393	16	43	0	65	3	8	0	509	19
Schalke 04	1977–78	Bundesliga	12	0	3	0	–		–		15	0
Metz	1978–79	Ligue 1	24	0	–		–		–		24	0
Los Angeles Aztecs	1979	NASL	24	1	–		–		–		24	1
Los Angeles Aztecs	1980	NASL	32	2	–		–		–		32	2
Los Angeles Aztecs	1981	NASL	17	0	–		–		–		17	0
Los Angeles Aztecs	Total		73	3	0	0	0	0	0	0	73	3
Sparta	1980–81	Eredivisie	11	1	1	0	–		–		12	1
Tung Sing	1982	Hong Kong First Division	4	0	–		–		–		4	0
San Jose Earthquakes	1982	NASL	23	0	–		–		–		23	0
Career total			539	20	47	0	65	3	8	0	659	23

=== International ===
Appearances and goals by national team and year
National team	Year	Apps	Goals
Netherlands	1966	2	0
Netherlands	1967	5	2
Netherlands	1968	3	0
Netherlands	1969	4	0
Netherlands	1970	2	0
Netherlands	1971	2	1
Netherlands	1972	1	0
Netherlands	1973	6	0
Netherlands	1974	12	0
Netherlands	1975	6	0
Netherlands	1976	4	0
Netherlands	1977	6	0
Netherlands	1978	7	0
Total		60	3

Scores and results list the Netherlands' goal tally first, score column indicates score after each Suurbier goal.

List of international goals scored by Wim Suurbier
No.	Date	Venue	Opponent	Score	Result	Competition
1	10 May 1967	Népstadion, Budapest, Hungary	Hungary	1–2	1–2	UEFA Euro 1968 qualification
2	4 October 1967	Københavns Idrætspark, Copenhagen, Denmark	Denmark	1–3	2–3	UEFA Euro 1968 qualification
3	24 February 1971	De Kuip, Rotterdam, Netherlands	Luxembourg	6–0	6–0	UEFA Euro 1972 qualification

== Honours ==
Ajax

- Eredivisie (7): 1965–66, 1966–67, 1967–68, 1969–70, 1971–72, 1972–73, 1976–77
- KNVB Cup: 1966–67, 1969-1970, 1970–71, 1971–72
- European Cup: 1970–71, 1971–72, 1972–73; runner-up: 1968-69
- European Super Cup: 1972, 1973
- Intercontinental Cup: 1972

Netherlands

- FIFA World Cup runner-up: 1974, 1978
- UEFA Euro third place: 1976
- Tournoi de Paris: 1978

Individual

- Sport Ideal European XI: 1972, 1974
