= Piet Keizer =

Dutch footballer (1943–2017)

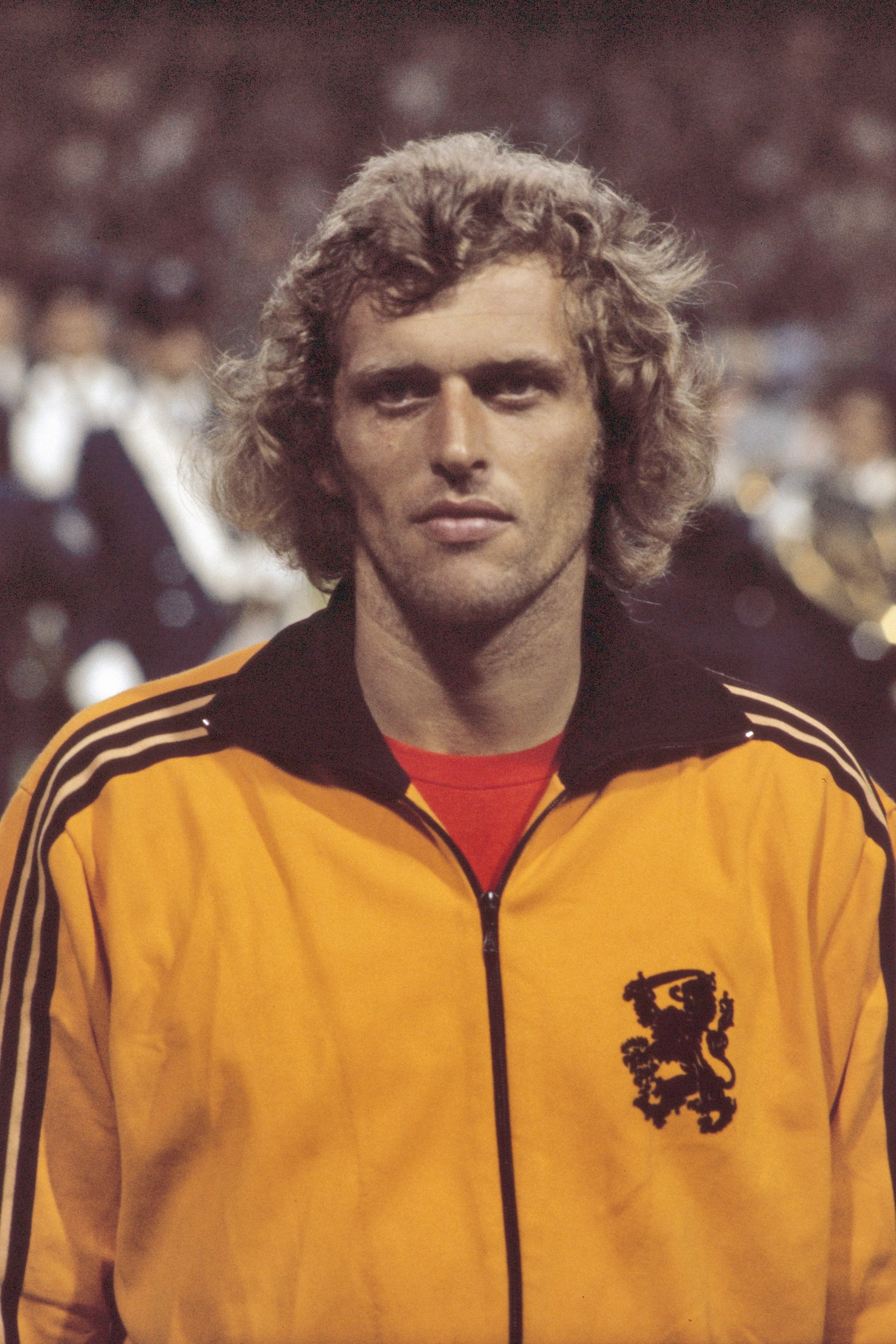
- Keizer in 1973

Personal information
- Full name: Petrus Johannes Keizer
- Date of birth: 14 June 1943
- Place of birth: Amsterdam, Netherlands
- Date of death: 10 February 2017 (aged 73)
- Place of death: Amsterdam, Netherlands
- Height: 1.75 m (5 ft 9 in)
- Position: Left winger

Youth career
- 1953–1955: Amstel
- 1955–1961: Ajax

Senior career*
Years	Team	Apps	(Gls)
1961–1974	Ajax	364	(146)

International career
1962–1974	Netherlands	34	(11)
Medal record
Men's football
Representing Netherlands
FIFA World Cup
Runner-up	1974 West Germany
- * Club domestic league appearances and goals

Petrus Johannes "Piet" Keizer (14 June 1943 – 10 February 2017) was a Dutch professional footballer who played as a left winger.

As part of the "Total Football" Ajax Amsterdam team of the 1960s and 1970s, Keizer was particularly notable during the successive managerial tenures of Rinus Michels and Stefan Kovacs (1965–1973). He is widely considered one of the greatest players in Dutch football history. Dutch writer Nico Scheepmaker once said: "Cruyff is the best, but Keizer is the better one".

== Club career ==
Keizer totalled 489 official matches for Ajax, scoring 189 goals between 1961 and 1974, and is a member of the Club van 100 at Ajax, a list of players playing more than 100 official games for the club. He made his debut in the first team on 5 February 1961 against Feyenoord. He played predominantly on the left-wing and with Ajax, he won three consecutive European Cups (1971, 1972, 1973), having lost the 1969 European Cup final to AC Milan. In addition, he won six Eredivisie titles, five KNVB Cups, two European Super Cups, one Intercontinental Cup and one Intertoto Cup.

In March 1964, Keizer got seriously injured during a KNVB Cup match against DWS; a critical surgery was needed due to a skull fracture and a blood clot in his brains.

In August 1973, under new Ajax manager George Knobel, the Ajax players voted in a secret ballot for Keizer to be the team's next captain, ahead of Johan Cruyff. Just weeks later Cruyff left Ajax to join Barcelona.

== International career ==
With the Dutch national team, Keizer played 34 times, scoring 11 goals. He made his international debut in an 8–0 friendly win against the Netherlands Antilles in 1962. Keizer was selected by Netherlands manager, Rinus Michels, to play for the Dutch squad during the 1974 FIFA World Cup, but only started in the 0–0 draw against Sweden.

== End of career ==
Keizer suddenly retired from football in October 1974, shortly after a row over tactics with Ajax manager Hans Kraay.

== Personal life ==
On 13 June 1967, Keizer married Jenny Hoopman. The couple had two sons.

Keizer died of lung cancer in February 2017, after a long illness.

Football player and manager Marcel Keizer, who played in the Ajax youth academy and was a manager of the first team in 2017, is a nephew of Piet Keizer.

== Style of play ==
UEFA website has described Keizer as "the genius on the left wing, the skillful flanker, the superb foil to Johan Cruyff".

Cruyff, in his posthumously released autobiography, placed Keizer, as left winger, in his "ideal squad".

== Career statistics ==
=== Club ===
Appearances and goals by club, season and competition
Club	Season	League			National cup (Note: Appearances in KNVB Cup)		Continental		Other		Total	
Club	Season	Division	Apps	Goals	Apps	Goals	Apps	Goals	Apps	Goals	Apps	Goals
Ajax	1960–61	Eredivisie	15	6	5	2	—		—		20	8
Ajax	1961–62	Eredivisie	23	12	1	0	9 (Note: Appearances in Inter-Cities Fairs Cup)	8	—		33	20
Ajax	1962–63	Eredivisie	25	11	2	0	2	1	—		29	12
Ajax	1963–64	Eredivisie	20	13	2	2	5	1	—		27	16
Ajax	1964–65	Eredivisie	11	3	—		—		—		11	3
Ajax	1965–66	Eredivisie	28	13	5	0	—		—		33	13
Ajax	1966–67	Eredivisie	28	11	5	3	5 (Note: Appearances in European Cup)	2	—		38	16
Ajax	1967–68	Eredivisie	25	9	6	3	2	0	—		33	12
Ajax	1968–69	Eredivisie	27	10	2	2	14	2	—		43	14
Ajax	1969–70	Eredivisie	32	18	5	4	8	1	—		45	23
Ajax	1970–71	Eredivisie	32	9	5	0	9	4	—		46	13
Ajax	1971–72	Eredivisie	31	14	5	3	9	2	—		45	19
Ajax	1972–73	Eredivisie	31	12	—		6	2	4 (Note: Two appearances in European Super Cup, two appearances in Intercontinental Cup)	0	41	14
Ajax	1973–74	Eredivisie	31	4	3	0	2	0	2 (Note: Two appearances in European Super Cup)	1	38	5
Ajax	1974–75	Eredivisie	5	1	—		2 (Note: Appearances in UEFA Cup)	0	—		7	1
Career total			364	146	46	19	73	23	6	1	489	189

=== International ===
Appearances and goals by national team and year
National team	Year	Apps	Goals
Netherlands	1962	2	1
Netherlands	1963	2	1
Netherlands	1964	0	0
Netherlands	1965	1	0
Netherlands	1966	5	1
Netherlands	1967	6	2
Netherlands	1968	0	0
Netherlands	1969	0	0
Netherlands	1970	3	0
Netherlands	1971	5	5
Netherlands	1972	4	1
Netherlands	1973	4	0
Netherlands	1974	2	0
Total		34	11

Scores and results list the Netherlands' goal tally first, score column indicates score after each Keizer goal.

List of international goals scored by Piet Keizer
No.	Date	Venue	Opponent	Score	Result	Competition
1	5 September 1962	Olympisch Stadion, Amsterdam, Netherlands	Netherlands Antilles	4–0	8–0	Friendly
2	20 October 1963	Olympisch Stadion, Amsterdam, Netherlands	Belgium	1–0	1–1	Friendly
3	17 April 1966	De Kuip, Rotterdam, Netherlands	Belgium	2–0	3–1	Friendly
4	5 April 1967	Zentralstadion, Leipzig, East Germany	East Germany	2–0	3–4	UEFA Euro 1968 qualification
5	5 April 1967	Zentralstadion, Leipzig, East Germany	East Germany	3–2	3–4	UEFA Euro 1968 qualification
6	24 February 1971	De Kuip, Rotterdam, Netherlands	Luxembourg	2–0	6–0	UEFA Euro 1972 qualification
7	24 February 1971	De Kuip, Rotterdam, Netherlands	Luxembourg	5–0	6–0	UEFA Euro 1972 qualification
8	10 October 1971	De Kuip, Rotterdam, Netherlands	East Germany	2–1	3–2	UEFA Euro 1972 qualification
9	10 October 1971	De Kuip, Rotterdam, Netherlands	East Germany	3–1	3–2	UEFA Euro 1972 qualification
10	17 November 1971	Philips Stadion, Eindhoven, Netherlands	Luxembourg	2–0	8–0	UEFA Euro 1972 qualification
11	1 November 1972	De Kuip, Rotterdam, Netherlands	Norway	7–0	9–0	1974 FIFA World Cup qualification

== Honours ==
Ajax

- Eredivisie: 1965–66, 1966–67, 1967–68, 1969–70, 1971–72, 1972–73
- KNVB Cup: 1960–61, 1966–67, 1969-70, 1970–71, 1971–72; runner-up: 1967–68
- European Cup: 1970–71, 1971–72, 1972–73; runner-up: 1968–69
- UEFA Super Cup: 1972, 1973
- Intercontinental Cup: 1972
- Intertoto Cup: 1961–62, 1968 (Group A2 winner)

Netherlands

- FIFA World Cup runner-up: 1974

Individual

- Winger in Johan Cruyff's favourite World XI

== See also ==
- List of one-club men
