= Gerrie Mühren =

Dutch footballer

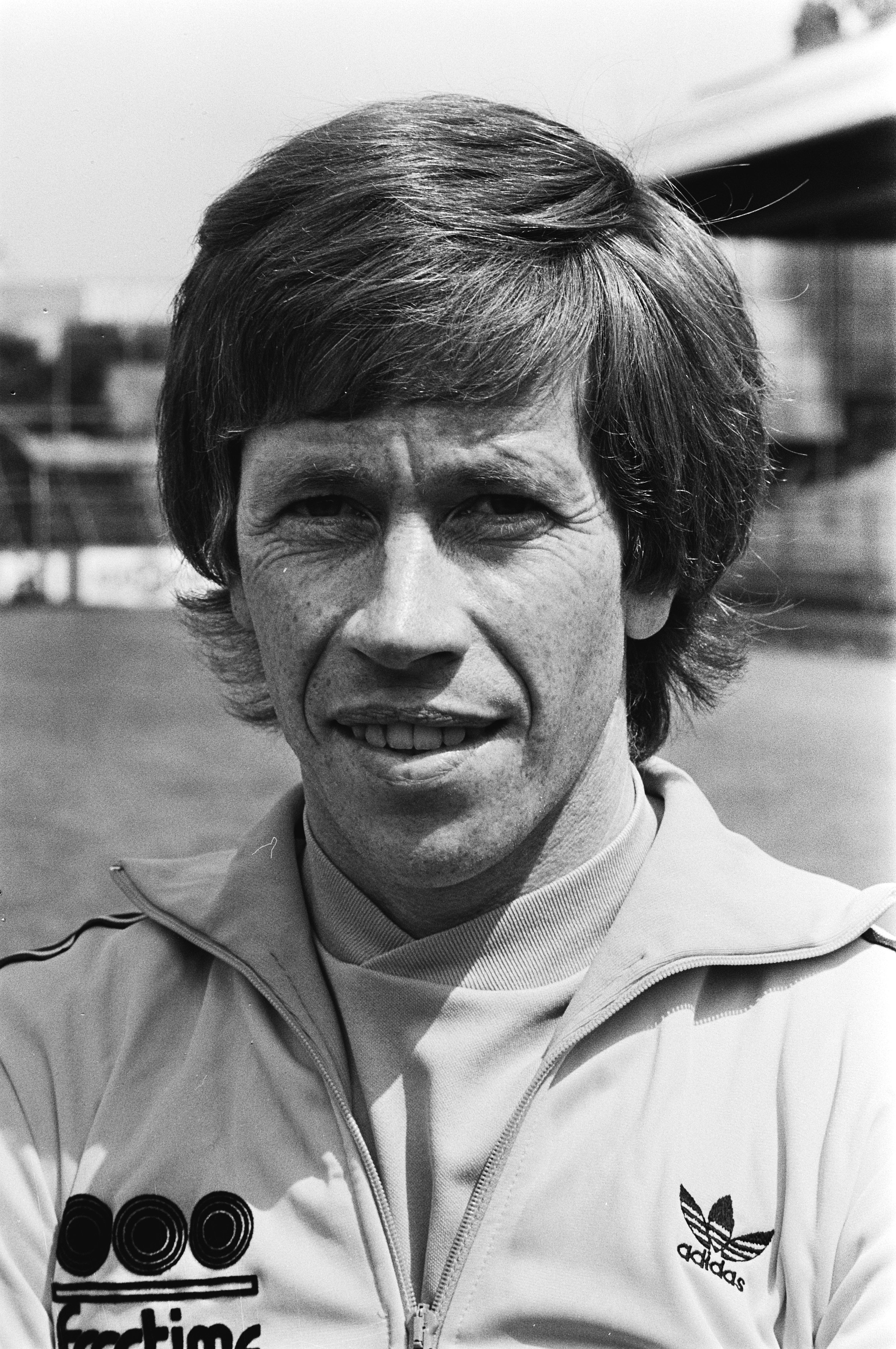
- Mühren in 1979

Personal information
- Full name: Gerardus Dominicus Hyacinthus Maria Mühren
- Date of birth: 2 February 1946
- Place of birth: Volendam, Netherlands
- Date of death: 28 September 2013 (aged 67)
- Position: Midfielder

Youth career
- RKSV Volendam

Senior career*
Years	Team	Apps	(Gls)
1963–1968	RKSV Volendam	52	(7)
1968–1976	Ajax	220	(54)
1976–1978	Real Betis	59	(11)
1978–1980	Volendam	33	(7)
1980–1981	MVV	26	(3)
1981–1982	Seiko	20	(2)
1982–1984	DS '79	18	(0)
1984–1985	Volendam	17	(0)

International career
1969–1973	Netherlands	10	(0)
- * Club domestic league appearances and goals

Gerardus ("Gerrie") Dominicus Hyacinthus Maria Mühren (2 February 1946 – 19 September 2013) was a Dutch footballer who played as a midfielder. He was the older brother of Arnold Mühren, who likewise played for the Netherlands national team.

== Club career ==
Born in Volendam, North Holland, Mühren started his career at RKAV Volendam, before moving to play for Ajax between 1968 and 1976. Whilst at Ajax he won three European Cup winners medals. He also scored in back-to-back KNVB Cup final wins for Ajax in 1971 and 1972. He scored Ajax' 1000th Eredivisie goal against Telstar and the winning goal of the 1972–73 European Cup semi-final second leg against Real Madrid.

He later played for Real Betis in Spain, and Seiko in Hong Kong. Whilst he was at Betis they won the 1977 Copa del Rey but he was denied a winners' medal, for foreigners were not allowed to play in the cup competition.

In 1983, he won the Dutch Eerste Divisie title with DS '79, but the club was relegated from the Eredivisie the next year, which prompted him to return for a final season to Volendam.

== International career ==
Mühren was capped by the Netherlands national team on ten occasions, his first cap coming against England in November 1969, and his last against Belgium in November 1973.

== Retirement and death ==
After retiring as a player he worked as a scout for Ajax. He died of myelodysplastic syndrome, aged 67, in his home town of Volendam.

== Career statistics ==
=== International ===
Appearances and goals by national team and year
National team	Year	Apps	Goals
Netherlands	1969	1	0
Netherlands	1970	2	0
Netherlands	1971	3	0
Netherlands	1972	1	0
Netherlands	1973	3	0
Total		10	0

== Honours ==
Volendam

- Eerste Divisie: 1966–67

Ajax

- Eredivisie: 1969–70, 1971–72, 1972–73
- KNVB Cup: 1969–70, 1970–71, 1971–72
- European Cup: 1970–71, 1971–72, 1972–73
- European Super Cup: 1972, 1973
- Intercontinental Cup: 1972

Dordrecht

- Eerste Divisie: 1982–83

Seiko

- Hong Kong First Division League: 1981–82, 1982–83
