= 1971–72 Eerste Divisie =

16th season of the second-tier football league in Netherlands

Eerste Divisie
- Season: 1971–72
- Champions: HFC Haarlem
- Promoted: FC Eindhoven; Fortuna Vlaardingen; PEC Zwolle; Roda JC; De Volewijckers; FC VVV
- Relegated: None: Tweede Divisie disbanded
- From Eredivisie: HFC Haarlem; AZ'67
- To Eredivisie: HFC Haarlem; AZ'67
- Goals: 1,002
- Average goals/game: 2.38

The Dutch Eerste Divisie (English: First Division) in the 1971–72 season was contested by 21 teams, five more than in the previous year. Due to the disbandment of the Tweede Divisie, six teams were promoted to the Eerste Divisie; the rest of the teams returned to amateur football. As a result of the disbandment, teams no longer could relegate to lower leagues. HFC Haarlem won the championship.

== New entrants ==
Promoted from the 1970–71 Tweede Divisie:

- FC Eindhoven
- Fortuna Vlaardingen
- PEC Zwolle
- Roda JC
- De Volewijckers
- VVV-Venlo

Relegated from the 1970–71 Eredivisie:

- AZ'67
- HFC Haarlem

== League standings ==
Pos	Team	Pld	W	D	L	GF	GA	GD	Pts	Promotion or qualification
1	HFC Haarlem	40	26	10	4	74	23	+51	62	Promoted to Eredivisie.
2	AZ'67	40	22	11	7	68	31	+37	55	Promoted to Eredivisie.
3	sc Heerenveen	40	19	13	8	53	33	+20	51	
4	Roda JC	40	20	9	11	53	42	+11	49	
5	FC Eindhoven	40	16	14	10	50	47	+3	46	
6	FC Wageningen	40	17	12	11	54	51	+3	46	
7	PEC Zwolle	40	17	9	14	58	56	+2	43	
8	SC Cambuur	40	15	12	13	48	40	+8	42	
9	HVC	40	14	13	13	43	48	−5	41	
10	Veendam	40	14	12	14	48	55	−7	40	
11	De Graafschap	40	13	12	15	49	48	+1	38	
12	Blauw-Wit Amsterdam	40	14	10	16	37	44	−7	38	Merged with DWS to form FC Amsterdam.
13	Fortuna SC	40	11	14	15	48	46	+2	36	
14	Heracles	40	13	9	18	46	45	+1	35	
15	Willem II	40	12	11	17	46	54	−8	35	
16	VVV-Venlo	40	11	12	17	42	50	−8	34	
17	SVV	40	12	10	18	44	54	−10	34	
18	De Volewijckers	40	8	16	16	35	49	−14	32	
19	Fortuna Vlaardingen	40	8	14	18	36	53	−17	30	
20	Helmond Sport	40	9	12	19	39	63	−24	30	
21	DFC	40	7	9	24	31	70	−39	23	Renamed FC Dordrecht for next season.

Source: "Netherlands - List of Final Tables". RSSSF.

== Attendances ==
#	Club	Average
1	Roda	6,500
2	Haarlem	6,425
3	Heerenveen	6,400
4	AZ	6,300
5	Eindhoven	5,775
6	De Graafschap	5,125
7	VVV	4,940
8	Wageningen	4,400
9	Fortuna	4,335
10	Zwolle	4,125
11	Cambuur	4,050
12	Veendam	4,000
13	SVV	3,075
14	Heracles	2,985
15	HVC	2,935
16	De Volewijckers	2,425
17	Vlaardingen	2,360
18	Helmond	2,115
19	Willem II	1,975
20	DFC	1,950
21	Blauw-Wit	1,870

== See also ==
- 1971–72 Eredivisie
- 1971–72 KNVB Cup

== Sources ==
- "Netherlands - List of Final Tables 1908–1996". RSSSF.
