= Karel Bonsink =

Dutch footballer and manager

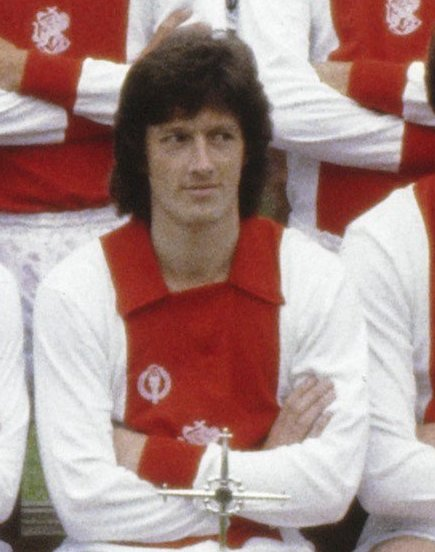
- Karel Bonsink at Ajax, 1979

Personal information
- Full name: Karel Bonsink
- Date of birth: 21 September 1950 (age 76)
- Place of birth: The Hague, Netherlands
- Position: Forward

Senior career*
Years	Team	Apps	(Gls)
1968–1971	DWS	62	(4)
1971–1974	FC Utrecht	98	(24)
1974–1978	RFC Liège	129	
1978–1979	RWDM	30	(10)
1979–1980	Ajax	26	(7)
1980–1981	RWDM	27	(10)
1981–1982	Rennes	26	(4)
1982–1983	Seiko	24	(8)

International career
1968-1969	Netherlands U-19	3	(0)
1971	Netherlands U-21	1	(0)

Managerial career
- 1989–1992: Abcoude
- 1992–1994: FC Utrecht (Youth)
- 1994–1996: AGOVV
- 1996–1997: NAC (Assistant)
- 1997–2000: Haarlem
- 2001–2013: Hilversum
- 2015–2019: Hilversum
- * Club domestic league appearances and goals

Karel Bonsink (born 21 September 1950) is a Dutch football manager and former professional player. He last coached FC Hilversum.

== Playing career ==
Born in The Hague, but raised in the Staatsliedenbuurt in Amsterdam, over the course of his career Bonsink has played as a forward for DWS, FC Utrecht, FC Luik, RWDM, Ajax, Stade Rennais F.C. and Seiko SA.

Bonsink played 3 games for the Netherlands national under-19 football team and one for Jong Oranje.

== Managerial career ==
Bonsink has managed FC Abcoude, AGOVV, HFC Haarlem and was a coach at FC Hilversum, competing in the Topklasse since 2010, where one of his sons was active as a player.

On 10 November 2013, it was announced that Bonsink would take a managerial position with West African side AS Dragons from Benin. This however faltered due to negotiations with his manager Humprey Nijman at the time. He returned to Hilversum in 2015.

== Honours ==
=== Club ===
Ajax

- Eredivisie: 1979–80

Seiko

- Hong Kong First Division League: 1982–83
