= 1970–71 Eredivisie =

15th season of the Eredivisie

Eredivisie
- Season: 1970–71
- Champions: Feijenoord (10th title)
- Promoted: FC Volendam; SBV Excelsior
- Relegated: AZ '67; HFC Haarlem
- European Cup: Feijenoord; AFC Ajax
- Cup Winners' Cup: Sparta Rotterdam
- UEFA Cup: ADO Den Haag; PSV Eindhoven
- Goals: 809
- Average goals/game: 2.64
- Top goalscorer: (Sweden) Ove Kindvall; Feijenoord 24 goals

The Dutch Eredivisie in the 1970–71 season was contested by 18 teams. Feijenoord won the championship.

== League standings ==
Pos	Team	Pld	W	D	L	GF	GA	GD	Pts	Qualification or relegation
1	Feijenoord	34	26	5	3	82	25	+57	57	Qualified for 1971–72 European Cup (Note: AFC Ajax competed in the 1971–72 European Cup as defending champions.)
2	AFC Ajax	34	24	5	5	90	20	+70	53	Qualified for 1971–72 European Cup
3	ADO Den Haag	34	21	8	5	62	27	+35	50	Qualified for 1971–72 UEFA Cup
4	PSV Eindhoven	34	21	7	6	73	25	+48	49	Qualified for 1971–72 UEFA Cup
5	FC Twente	34	19	10	5	48	18	+30	48	
6	Sparta Rotterdam	34	16	13	5	54	34	+20	45	Qualified for 1971–72 UEFA Cup Winners' Cup
7	Go Ahead Eagles	34	15	8	11	49	43	+6	38	
8	NEC	34	12	10	12	43	36	+7	34	
9	FC Utrecht	34	13	7	14	46	64	−18	33	
10	FC Volendam	34	9	10	15	34	48	−14	28	
11	Telstar	34	9	9	16	32	46	−14	27	
12	DWS	34	5	17	12	26	54	−28	27	
13	MVV Maastricht	34	8	10	16	28	42	−14	26	
14	NAC	34	7	10	17	40	61	−21	24	
15	Holland Sport	34	5	14	15	34	60	−26	24	Merged with ADO Den Haag to form FC Den Haag
16	SBV Excelsior	34	5	10	19	22	66	−44	20	
17	AZ '67	34	3	9	22	24	76	−52	15	Relegated to Eerste Divisie
18	HFC Haarlem	34	1	12	21	22	64	−42	14	Relegated to Eerste Divisie

Source: rsssf.com

== Results ==
Home \ Away	ADO	AJA	AZ	DWS	EXC	FEY	GOA	HFC	HOL	MVV	NAC	NEC	PSV	SPA	TEL	TWE	UTR	VOL
ADO		1–0	3–0	4–0	0–0	2–0	3–0	6–0	0–0	4–0	3–0	3–1	1–1	2–1	1–0	1–1	4–0	2–1
Ajax	3–0		8–1	4–0	7–0	1–3	5–1	4–0	2–1	2–0	3–0	4–1	1–0	2–2	3–1	3–0	7–1	4–0
AZ '67	1–1	0–3		0–0	1–1	0–4	0–1	4–0	3–3	0–2	2–1	1–1	0–1	1–1	0–1	0–2	1–3	1–1
DWS	0–1	0–1	0–0		0–0	0–4	2–1	1–0	0–0	1–0	1–1	2–2	0–1	2–1	0–0	0–0	2–2	2–2
Excelsior	1–1	1–1	0–0	0–0		0–4	0–2	1–0	1–0	3–0	2–2	2–1	1–4	0–2	1–2	1–2	1–2	0–0
Feijenoord	0–0	1–1	6–1	3–0	4–2		3–0	2–1	6–1	1–0	3–0	1–0	2–1	4–1	4–0	1–1	4–1	3–0
Go Ahead	3–0	4–1	2–0	0–0	3–0	1–2		1–1	4–0	1–0	4–3	2–2	3–3	0–1	3–1	1–0	2–0	0–0
Haarlem	1–2	0–5	2–3	2–2	2–0	0–1	0–0		1–1	1–1	2–2	1–1	1–3	1–1	0–1	0–4	1–1	0–1
Holland Sport	2–3	0–3	3–1	1–1	2–3	2–3	2–2	1–1		1–1	0–0	1–0	0–5	0–2	1–1	0–0	1–1	2–1
MVV	0–1	1–0	1–0	2–0	0–0	1–1	0–1	1–1	0–1		3–1	2–0	0–3	3–3	1–1	0–2	6–0	0–0
NAC	0–3	0–2	5–2	1–4	1–0	1–3	3–1	2–0	3–4	3–1		1–1	0–3	0–0	2–0	0–1	1–2	2–1
N.E.C.	1–2	0–0	3–0	1–0	5–0	1–0	2–1	1–0	1–1	3–0	1–1		0–0	3–0	3–0	0–0	2–1	4–0
PSV	1–0	0–3	6–0	8–0	3–0	2–3	2–1	1–0	3–0	2–0	1–1	2–0		0–0	2–1	0–0	4–1	4–2
Sparta	4–2	0–0	2–1	6–1	5–1	1–1	1–2	0–0	1–0	0–0	1–1	2–1	1–0		1–0	2–1	3–1	1–0
Telstar	0–2	0–1	4–0	1–1	1–0	1–0	0–1	6–3	1–1	0–1	2–1	0–1	1–1	1–4		0–0	3–0	0–0
FC Twente '65	0–0	1–0	2–0	1–1	5–0	1–2	2–0	2–0	3–1	2–0	3–0	2–0	2–1	0–1	1–1		2–0	2–1
FC Utrecht	3–1	0–3	2–0	2–1	1–0	1–2	4–1	1–0	2–1	0–0	0–0	3–0	0–3	1–1	4–1	1–2		2–2
Volendam	2–3	0–3	1–0	2–2	3–0	0–1	0–0	1–0	1–0	3–1	2–1	1–0	0–2	2–2	2–0	0–1	2–3	

Source: rsssf.com
Legend: Blue = home team win; Yellow = draw; Red = away team win.

== Attendances ==
#	Club	Average	Change
1	Feijenoord	47,824	+11.6
2	Ajax	25,059	+18.5
3	Utrecht	16,559	+65.0
4	PSV	16,382	+26.6
5	ADO	16,147	+29.8
6	Twente	15,353	+2.4
7	Sparta	14,000	+29.3
8	Go Ahead	12,294	+6.9
9	NEC	12,147	−0.1
10	NAC	9,265	−1.3
11	Holland Sport	8,500	−27.9
12	DWS	8,206	+36.2
13	AZ	7,912	−7.2
14	Telstar	7,912	−4.3
15	MVV	7,871	−20.4
16	Excelsior	7,118	+47.6
17	Volendam	7,059	+41.2
18	Haarlem	6,971	−28.6

== See also ==
- 1970–71 Eerste Divisie
- 1970–71 Tweede Divisie
- 1970–71 KNVB Cup
