= Frans Derks =

Dutch football referee and sports executive (1930–2020)

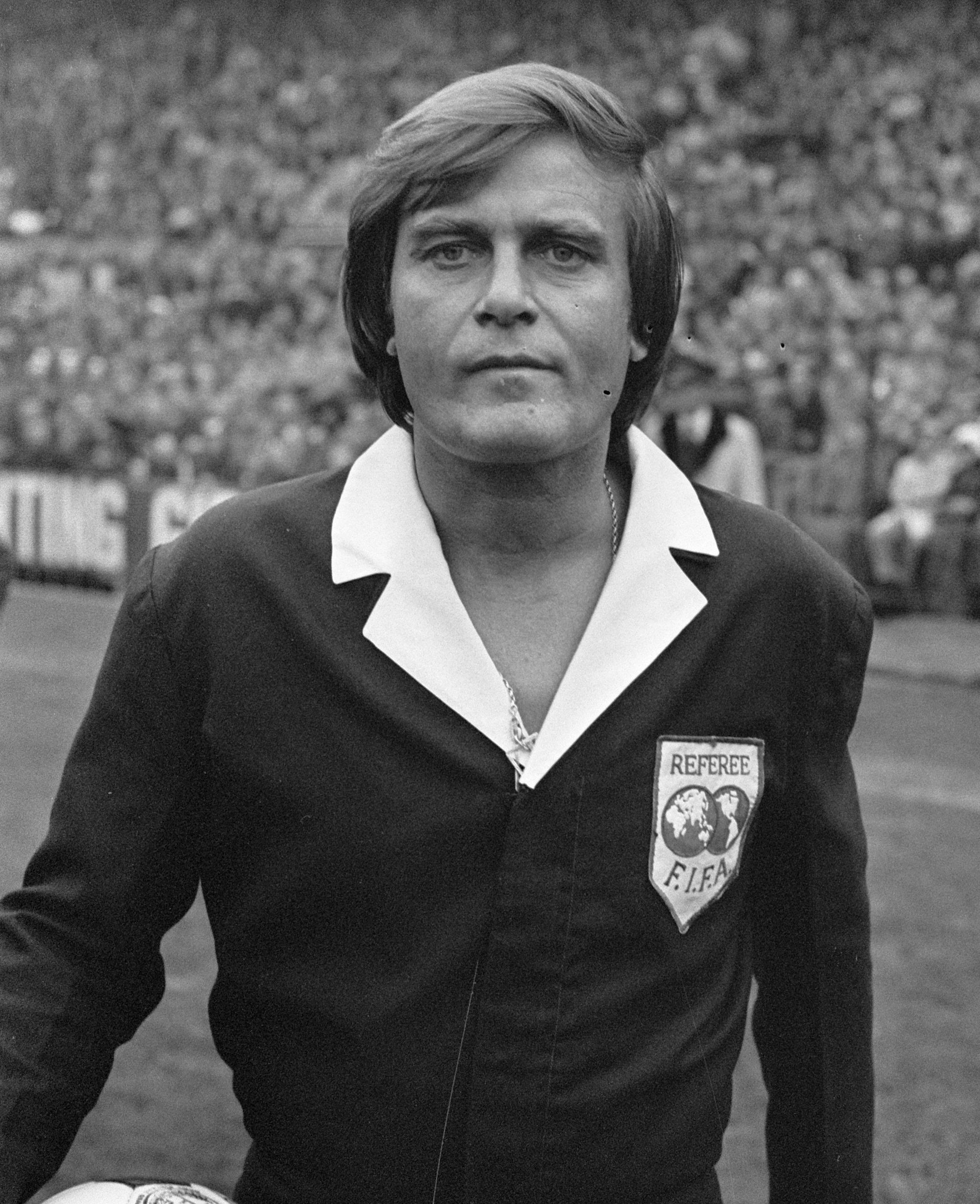
- Derks in 1976
- Full name: Frans Derks
- Born: 1 November 1930; Vaals, Netherlands
- Died: 25 September 2020 (aged 89); Breda, Netherlands
- Other occupation: Chairman (FC Dordrecht, Brevok)

Domestic
Years	League	Role
1956–1978		Referee
1967-1978	Eredivisie	Referee

Frans Derks (1 November 1930 – 25 September 2020) was a Dutch football referee and sports executive.

== Early years ==
Born in 1930 in Vaals, Limburg, Derks went to boarding school and studied mechanical engineering in Zürich. After graduation, he became crisis manager and director at a cleaning company. He also was a quizmaster, singer (he recorded a song with Willem van Hanegem) and writer.

== Refereeing career ==
Active from the 1950s through the 1970s, Derks was a flamboyant and outspoken referee, known for wearing tight shorts during matches. He was much appreciated by Dutch players for not stopping matches too much and not showing many cards, cheekily declaring he had no space left in his shorts for cards. He claimed never to have refereed a match won by a German team, a promise he had made to his late father.

== Sports executive ==
Derks was chairman of football club FC Dordrecht from 1995 until 2003 and he was a member of the board at NAC Breda. He was also chairman of volleyball club Brevok between 1978 and 1994.

He was named Officer of the Order of Orange-Nassau in 2009 for all he did for football in the Netherlands.

Derks died after a short illness in Breda in September 2020.
