= Nico Rijnders =

Dutch footballer

Reinier Rijnders
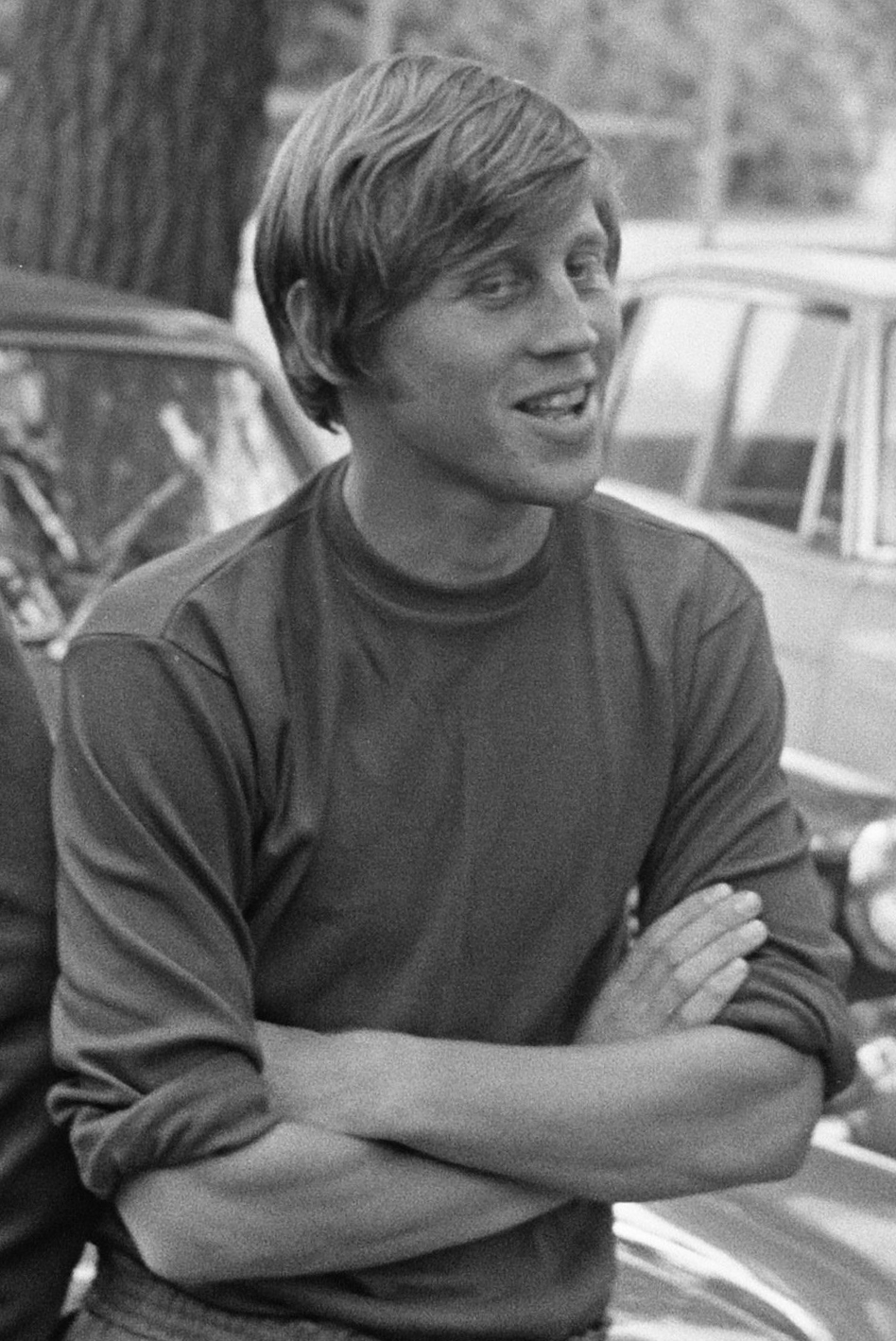
- Rijnders in 1969

Personal information
- Full name: Nico Rijnders
- Date of birth: 30 July 1947
- Place of birth: Breda, the Netherlands
- Date of death: 16 March 1976 (aged 28)
- Place of death: Bruges, Belgium
- Position: Midfielder

Senior career*
Years	Team	Apps	(Gls)
1965–1968	NAC Breda	64	(4)
1968–1969	Go Ahead Eagles	32	(1)
1969–1971	Ajax Amsterdam	61	(3)
1971–1972	Club Brugge	40	(5)
Total		197	(13)

International career^{‡}
1969–1970	Netherlands	8	(0)
- * Club domestic league appearances and goals ‡ National team caps and goals as of 15 July 2011

Reinier Johannes Maria "Nico" Rijnders (30 July 1947 – 16 March 1976) was a Dutch footballer who played for NAC Breda and Ajax Amsterdam and was part of their European Cup victory in 1971. He earned 8 caps for the Netherlands national football team. He collapsed on 12 November 1972 while playing for Club Brugge against RFC Liège and was clinically dead when he was transported off the pitch, he was successfully reanimated by the club doctor but the incident ended Rijnders' playing career. His health condition was never fully recovered and he died three years later, aged 28.
