= 1971–72 KNVB Cup =

Tournament details
- Country: Netherlands
- Teams: 32

Final positions
- Champions: Ajax
- Runners-up: FC Den Haag

The 1971-72 KNVB Cup was the 54th edition of the Dutch national football annual knockout tournament for the KNVB Cup. 32 teams contested, beginning on 9 January 1972 and ending at the final on 11 May 1972.

Ajax successfully defended its 1971 title achieving its 7th KNVB Cup defeating FC Den Haag, 3–2. Ajax being the champions of the Eredivisie achieved a double. They contested in the European Cup, so finalists FC Den Haag would participate in the Cup Winners' Cup.

== Teams ==
- All 18 participants of the Eredivisie 1971–72
- 14 participants of the Eerste Divisie 1971–72

== First round ==
The matches of the first round were played on 9 January 1972.

Home team	Result	Away team
sc Heerenveen _{1}	0–1	Sparta _{E}
Heracles _{1}	1–4	Go Ahead Eagles _{E}
NAC _{E}	1–0	SVV _{1}
NEC _{E}	2–1	Roda JC _{1}
PSV _{E}	2–0	FC Eindhoven _{1}
Telstar _{E}	0–1	FC Wageningen _{1}
Veendam _{1}	0–1	FC Volendam _{E}
Willem II _{1}	1–2	Excelsior _{E}

Home team	Result	Away team
DWS _{E}	1–0	Vitesse Arnhem _{E} (on January 7)
Ajax _{E}	8–3	PEC Zwolle _{1}
AZ'67 _{1}	1–1 (p)	FC Den Haag _{E}
FC Groningen _{E}	1–0	FC Den Bosch _{E}
FC VVV _{1}	0–1	MVV _{E}
Feyenoord _{E}	3–0	Blauw Wit _{1}
Fortuna SC _{1}	1–0	FC Twente _{E}
HFC Haarlem _{1}	2–0	FC Utrecht _{E}

_{E} Eredivisie; _{1} Eerste Divisie

== Round of 16 ==
The matches of the round of 16 were played on February 11, 13 and 20, 1972.

Home team	Result	Away team
NEC	1–0	NAC
Excelsior	3–0	HFC Haarlem
FC Groningen	3–4 (aet)	FC Wageningen
MVV	1–2	FC Den Haag
Sparta	(p) 2-2	Feyenoord
FC Volendam	1–0	PSV
Ajax	3–0	Go Ahead Eagles
Fortuna Sittard	1–0	DWS

== Quarter finals ==
The quarter finals were played on March 15 and 29, 1972.

Home team	Result	Away team
Fortuna Sittard	0–0 (p)	FC Wageningen
Sparta	0–1	FC Den Haag
FC Volendam	1–0	Excelsior
Ajax	1–0	NEC

== Semi-finals ==
The semi-finals were played on April 11 and 12, 1972.

Home team	Result	Away team
Ajax	2–0	FC Volendam
FC Den Haag	2–0	FC Wageningen

== Final ==
11 May 1972

Ajax	3–2	FC Den Haag
Cruijff 34'; Mühren 61' (pen.); Keizer 85'		van Eeden 68'; Mansveld 85' (pen.)

De Kuip, Rotterdam
Attendance: 58,000
Referee: Jef Dorpmans

Ajax also were the champions of the Eredivisie, thereby taking the double. They would participate in the European Cup, so finalists FC Den Haag would participate in the Cup Winners' Cup.
