= 1970–71 KNVB Cup =

Tournament details
- Country: Netherlands
- Teams: 51

Final positions
- Champions: Ajax
- Runners-up: Sparta Rotterdam

The 1970-71 KNVB Cup was the 53rd edition of the Dutch national football annual knockout tournament for the KNVB Cup. 51 teams contested, beginning on 15 August 1970 and ending at the final on 20 May 1971.

Ajax successfully defended its 1971 title achieving its sixth KNVB title defeating Sparta Rotterdam, 2–1. Sparta Rotterdam contested in the Cup Winners' Cup, since Ajax finished second in the Eredivisie, already qualified for the European Cup.

== Teams ==
- The 18 participants of the Eredivisie 1970-71
- The 16 participants of the Eerste Divisie 1970-71
- The 17 participants of the Tweede Divisie 1970–71

== First round ==
The matches of the first round were played on 15-16 August 1970. Cupholders Ajax _{E} received a bye for this round.

Home team	Result	Away team
Holland Sport _{E}	4–0	RBC _{2}
HVC _{1}	0–3	PSV _{E}
MVV _{E}	(p) 2-2	Limburgia _{2}
RCH _{2}	(p) 0-0	Blauw Wit _{1}
Roda JC _{2}	0–1	NEC _{E}
Cambuur Leeuwarden _{1}	3–1	EDO _{2}
Sparta _{E}	2–1	VVV _{2}
SVV _{1}	2–1	FC Wageningen _{1}
Telstar _{E}	0–2	SC Drenthe _{2}
Vitesse Arnhem _{1}	(p) 1-1	ZFC _{2}
FC Volendam _{E}	1–2	Heracles _{1}
Willem II _{1}	1–0	PEC Zwolle _{2}

Home team	Result	Away team
AGOVV _{2}	0–5	Feijenoord _{E}
AZ'67 _{E}	2–0	Helmond Sport _{1}
De Graafschap _{1}	2–3 (aet)	NOAD _{2}
De Volewijckers _{2}	1–3	ADO _{E}
DFC _{1}	0–1	HFC Haarlem _{E}
DWS _{E}	2–1	VV Baronie _{2}
Excelsior _{E}	1–0 (aet)	Fortuna Vlaardingen _{2}
FC Den Bosch _{1}	2–0	sc Heerenveen _{1}
GVAV _{1}	2–1	SC Gooiland _{2}
FC Twente _{E}	7–0	Hermes DVS _{2}
FC Utrecht _{E}	3–1	FC Eindhoven _{2}
Fortuna Sittard _{1}	1–0	NAC _{E}
Go Ahead Eagles _{E}	9–2	Veendam _{1}

_{E} Eredivisie; _{1} Eerste Divisie; _{2} Tweede Divisie

== Second round ==
The matches of the second round were played on November 8, 1970. The following clubs received a bye: Fortuna Sittard, FC Twente, Holland Sport, HFC Haarlem, Sparta Rotterdam and SC Drenthe.

Home team	Result	Away team
NEC	2–0	Vitesse Arnhem
NOAD	1–1 (p)	FC Den Bosch
PSV	0–0 (p)	Feijenoord
RCH	2–0	MVV
Cambuur Leeuwarden	4–2	Willem II

Home team	Result	Away team
AZ'67	2–2 (p)	SVV
DWS	2–0	FC Utrecht
Excelsior	1–2 (aet)	FC Groningen
Go Ahead Eagles	1–2	ADO
Heracles	0–3	Ajax

== Round of 16 ==
The matches of the round of 16 were played on March 14, 1971.

Home team	Result	Away team
Ajax	4–0	FC Den Bosch
FC Groningen	2–1	Holland Sport
Fortuna Sittard	2–1	SVV
HFC Haarlem	0–1	ADO
NEC	1–0	DWS
Cambuur Leeuwarden	0–3	Feijenoord
SC Drenthe	0–1 (aet)	RCH
Sparta	3–2 (aet)	FC Twente

== Quarter finals ==
The quarter finals were played on April 7 and 8 1971.

Home team	Result	Away team
Feijenoord	1–2	Ajax
Fortuna Sittard	2–1 (aet)	FC Groningen
NEC	1–0	ADO
RCH	1–4	Sparta

== Semi-finals ==
The semi-finals were played on April 21 and 22 1971.

Home team	Result	Away team
Ajax	2–0	NEC
Fortuna Sittard	1–4	Sparta

== Final ==
5 May 1971

Ajax	2–2 (a.e.t.)	Sparta
Cruijff 62', 81'		Kowalik 39'; Visser 74'

De Kuip, Rotterdam
Attendance: 63,000
Referee: Laurens van Ravens

=== Replay ===
20 May 1971

Ajax	2–1	Sparta
Mühren 4' (pen.); Neeskens 52'		Walbeek 47'

Olympisch Stadion, Amsterdam
Attendance: 63,000
Referee: Laurens van Ravens

Sparta contested in the Cup Winners' Cup, since Ajax finished second in the Eredivisie, already qualified for the European Cup.
