= 1971–72 Eredivisie =

16th season of the Eredivisie

Eredivisie
- Season: 1971–72
- Champions: AFC Ajax (15th title)
- Promoted: FC Groningen; FC Den Bosch; Vitesse Arnhem
- Relegated: FC Volendam; Vitesse Arnhem
- European Cup: Ajax
- Cup Winners' Cup: FC Den Haag
- UEFA Cup: Feyenoord; FC Twente
- Goals: 812
- Average goals/game: 2.65
- Top goalscorer: (Netherlands) Johan Cruijff; AFC Ajax 25 goals

The Dutch Eredivisie in the 1971–72 season was contested by 18 teams. Ajax won the championship. FC Twente, finishing in third place, set an Eredivisie record-low for goals conceded with just 13 goals against.

== League standings ==
Pos	Team	Pld	W	D	L	GF	GA	GD	Pts	Qualification or relegation
1	AFC Ajax	34	30	3	1	104	20	+84	63	Qualified for 1972–73 European Cup
2	Feijenoord	34	26	3	5	73	24	+49	55	Qualified for 1972–73 UEFA Cup
3	FC Twente	34	17	14	3	50	13	+37	48	Qualified for 1972–73 UEFA Cup
4	Sparta Rotterdam	34	18	10	6	73	38	+35	46	
5	FC Den Haag	34	17	10	7	59	33	+26	44	Qualified for 1972–73 European Cup Winners' Cup
6	FC Utrecht	34	15	10	9	56	42	+14	40	
7	NEC	34	15	8	11	43	43	0	38	
8	PSV Eindhoven	34	13	10	11	47	32	+15	36	
9	Go Ahead Eagles	34	13	8	13	48	49	−1	34	
10	MVV Maastricht	34	10	10	14	36	47	−11	30	
11	Telstar	34	9	11	14	39	52	−13	29	
12	FC Groningen	34	8	12	14	37	55	−18	28	
13	NAC	34	9	9	16	39	58	−19	27	
14	DWS	34	7	6	21	28	54	−26	20	Merged with Blauw-Wit Amsterdam to form FC Amsterdam
15	SBV Excelsior	34	4	12	18	18	53	−35	20	
16	FC Den Bosch	34	6	8	20	24	70	−46	20	
17	FC Volendam	34	5	7	22	16	55	−39	17	Relegation to Eerste Divisie
18	Vitesse Arnhem	34	5	7	22	22	74	−52	17	Relegation to Eerste Divisie

Source: rsssf.com

== Results ==
Home \ Away	AJA	DBO	DWS	EXC	FEY	GOA	GRO	DHA	MVV	NAC	NEC	PSV	SPA	TEL	TWE	UTR	VIT	VOL
Ajax		5–0	2–0	1–0	2–1	4–1	7–0	1–0	8–0	5–0	1–0	4–1	2–1	5–2	1–0	4–0	12–1	2–0
FC Den Bosch '67	0–1		0–0	0–0	0–5	2–1	1–1	2–3	2–3	3–2	1–1	0–7	0–3	1–0	0–0	1–4	2–1	0–1
DWS	0–2	2–3		1–0	0–2	1–1	3–0	0–1	2–3	2–4	2–3	1–1	1–2	0–1	1–1	2–0	1–0	1–0
Excelsior	0–4	0–0	0–2		0–1	0–2	1–1	1–1	1–1	1–1	2–1	0–3	0–0	0–1	0–0	2–4	0–0	1–0
Feijenoord	1–5	5–0	4–0	1–1		1–0	4–1	2–1	2–0	3–1	5–1	1–0	2–0	2–0	0–1	0–0	4–0	2–0
Go Ahead	3–2	1–0	0–1	1–0	0–1		2–1	2–3	1–1	1–0	2–2	3–1	1–1	5–0	1–4	1–1	5–1	3–0
FC Groningen	0–0	1–0	4–0	2–3	1–3	0–1		1–2	1–0	1–0	2–2	1–1	1–0	1–1	0–1	0–1	1–0	1–1
FC Den Haag	1–2	2–1	2–0	3–0	1–2	2–0	5–0		3–3	2–1	4–0	1–1	1–1	2–2	0–0	1–1	4–0	4–0
MVV	0–3	1–1	2–0	3–0	0–2	3–1	2–2	2–0		2–1	0–1	1–1	3–0	1–2	1–1	0–1	0–0	1–0
NAC	2–5	1–0	1–0	0–0	1–2	0–1	2–1	0–2	2–1		1–1	0–2	3–3	1–1	0–0	1–2	1–0	2–0
N.E.C.	0–1	1–0	3–1	1–0	1–2	3–0	0–0	1–0	0–0	1–0		1–0	1–2	2–1	0–2	3–1	2–0	2–0
PSV	1–1	2–0	1–0	1–2	2–0	2–0	2–1	0–1	0–1	2–2	2–1		0–1	3–0	0–0	1–0	2–1	4–0
Sparta	1–1	0–0	3–1	5–1	3–5	3–1	3–3	5–2	3–0	4–1	3–0	1–1		4–1	1–1	2–1	4–0	4–1
Telstar	1–2	1–0	1–1	1–1	1–3	1–1	0–0	1–2	1–0	2–2	2–2	2–1	1–2		0–2	0–2	2–0	3–0
FC Twente '65	0–2	7–0	0–0	3–0	1–0	4–0	4–2	0–0	2–0	5–1	1–1	2–0	1–0	1–0		0–1	0–0	4–0
FC Utrecht	2–3	6–3	1–0	6–1	0–0	3–3	2–2	1–1	1–0	1–2	3–1	1–0	0–0	1–1	1–1		5–1	2–1
Vitesse	1–3	2–0	3–2	1–0	0–2	1–3	1–2	0–2	1–1	1–2	2–3	1–1	0–6	1–1	0–1	1–0		1–0
Volendam	0–1	0–1	3–0	1–0	0–3	0–0	0–2	0–0	1–0	1–1	0–1	1–1	1–2	1–5	0–0	3–1	0–0	

Source: rsssf.com
Legend: Blue = home team win; Yellow = draw; Red = away team win.

== Attendances ==
No.	Club	Average	Change	Highest
1	Feijenoord	44,412	-7,1%	65,000
2	AFC Ajax	20,059	-20,0%	31,500
3	FC Utrecht	14,500	-12,4%	25,000
4	FC Twente	14,147	-7,9%	25,000
5	PSV	13,824	-15,6%	22,000
6	FC Den Bosch	12,324	45,6%	24,000
7	NEC	12,118	-0,2%	30,000
8	FC Den Haag	12,029	-25,5%	28,500
9	Sparta	11,029	-21,2%	31,000
10	Go Ahead Eagles	10,853	-11,7%	26,000
11	Vitesse	10,500	88,8%	20,000
12	FC Groningen	9,088	-14,3%	17,500
13	NAC	8,618	-7,0%	22,000
14	MVV Maastricht	7,971	1,3%	24,000
15	SC Telstar	7,324	-7,4%	20,000
16	SBV Excelsior	6,882	-3,3%	24,000
17	AFC DWS	6,618	-19,4%	30,000
18	FC Volendam	6,147	-12,9%	13,000

== See also ==
- 1971–72 Eerste Divisie
- 1971–72 KNVB Cup
