= 1986–87 European Cup Winners' Cup =

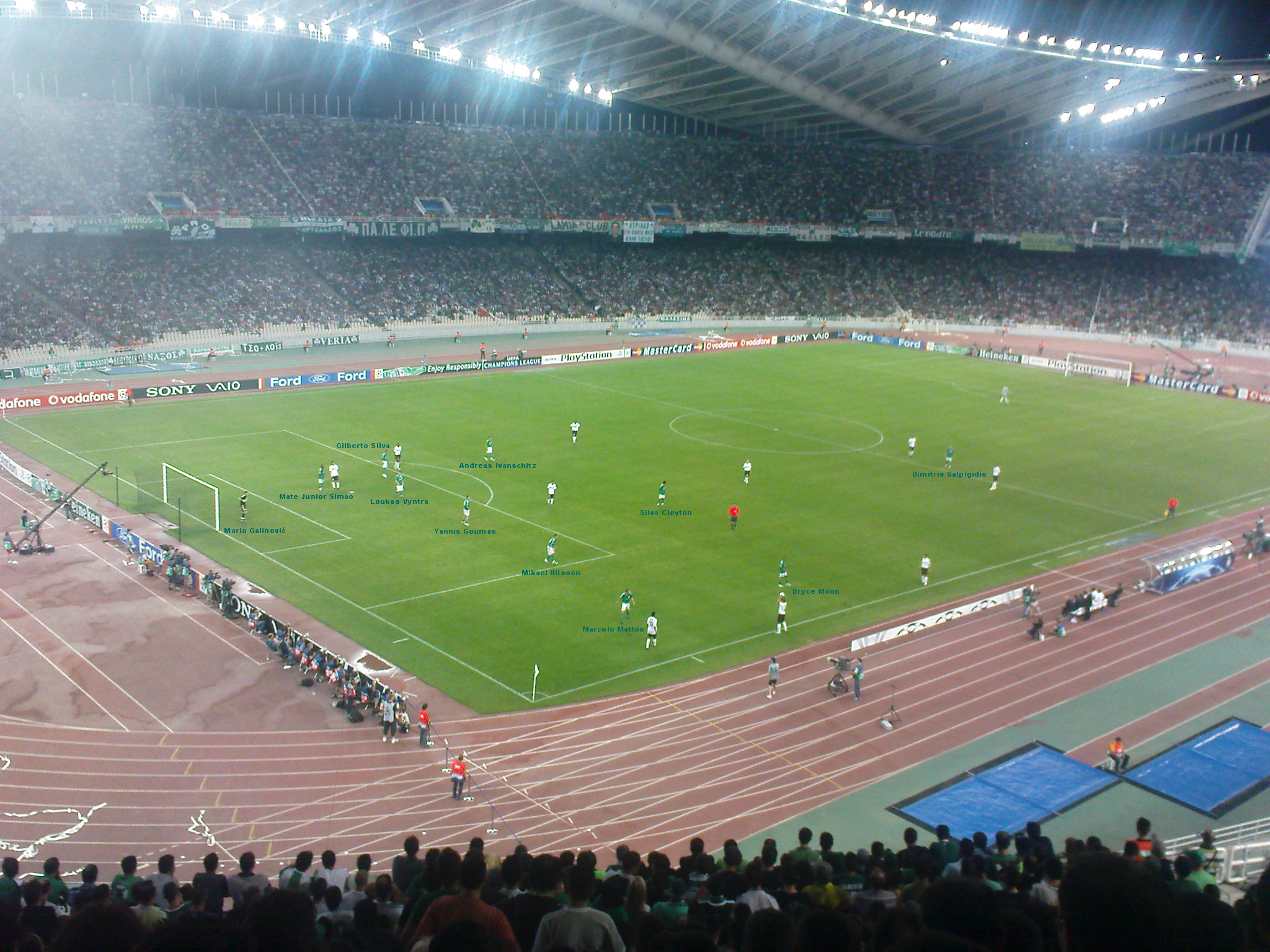

Tournament details
- Dates: 17 September 1986 – 13 May 1987
- Teams: 32

Final positions
- Champions: (Netherlands) Ajax (1st title)
- Runners-up: (East Germany) Lokomotive Leipzig

Tournament statistics
- Matches played: 61
- Goals scored: 172 (2.82 per match)
- Attendance: 1,174,667 (19,257 per match)
- Top scorer(s): John Bosman (Ajax); 8 goals

The 1986–87 season of the European Cup Winners' Cup was won by Ajax in the final against Lokomotive Leipzig. The young Ajax side, which included the likes of Marco van Basten, Frank Rijkaard and Dennis Bergkamp, was guided to victory by its coach Johan Cruyff. It was Ajax's only title in the competition, and was added to a hat-trick of European Cup wins from 1971 to 1973. They also went on to win another European Cup and a UEFA Cup in the 1990s.

== First round ==
Team 1	Agg.	Team 2	1st leg	2nd leg
Roma (Italy)	2–2 (3–4 p)	(Spain) Zaragoza	2–0	0–2 (aet)
Żurrieq (Malta)	0–7	(Wales) Wrexham	0–3	0–4
B 1903 (Denmark)	1–2	(Bulgaria) Vitosha Sofia	1–0	0–2
Vasas (Hungary)	4–5	(Socialist Federal Republic of Yugoslavia) Velež Mostar	2–2	2–3
17 Nëntori (Albania)	3–1	(Romania) Dinamo București	1–0	2–1
Malmö FF (Sweden)	7–2	(Cyprus) Apollon Limassol	6–0	1–2
Bursaspor (Turkey)	0–7	(Netherlands) Ajax	0–2	0–5
Olympiacos (Greece)	6–0	Union Luxembourg	3–0	3–0
Benfica (Portugal)	4–1	(Norway) Lillestrøm	2–0	2–1
Waterford United (Republic of Ireland)	1–6	(France) Bordeaux	1–2	0–4
Haka (Finland)	3–5	(Soviet Union) Torpedo Moscow	2–2	1–3
VfB Stuttgart (West Germany)	1–0	(Czechoslovakia) Spartak Trnava	1–0	0–0
Rapid Wien (Austria)	7–6	(Belgium) Club Brugge	4–3	3–3
Glentoran (Northern Ireland)	1–3	(East Germany) Lokomotive Leipzig	1–1	0–2
Fram Reykjavík (Iceland)	0–4	(Poland) Katowice	0–3	0–1
Aberdeen (Scotland)	2–4	(Switzerland) Sion	2–1	0–3

=== First leg ===
17 September 1986

Roma (Italy)	2–0	(Spain) Zaragoza
Di Carlo 23'; Gerolin 57'	Report

Stadio Olimpico, Rome
Attendance: 49,442
Referee: Siegfried Kirschen (East Germany)

17 September 1986

Żurrieq (Malta)	0–3	(Wales) Wrexham
	Report	Massey 14'; Charles 57'; Conroy 65'

National Stadium, Ta' Qali
Attendance: 3,652
Referee: Kostas Dimitriadis (Greece)

16 September 1986

B 1903 (Denmark)	1–0	(Bulgaria) Vitosha Sofia
Mathiesen 50'	Report

Gentofte Stadion, Copenhagen
Attendance: 4,593
Referee: Manfred Neuner (West Germany)

17 September 1986

Vasas (Hungary)	2–2	(Socialist Federal Republic of Yugoslavia) Velež Mostar
Bodnár 12'; Szabadi 70'	Report	Tuce 22'; Skočajić 60'

Illovszky Rudolf Stadion, Budapest
Attendance: 2,500
Referee: Ioan Igna (Romania)

17 September 1986

17 Nëntori Tirana (Albania)	1–0	(Romania) Dinamo București
Kola 86'	Report

Qemal Stafa Stadium, Tirana
Attendance: 16,000
Referee: Tadeusz Diakonowicz (Poland)

17 September 1986

Malmö FF (Sweden)	6–0	(Cyprus) Apollon Limassol
Elia 5' (o.g.); Larsson 16', 30', 54'; Nilsson 27'; Palmér 85'	Report

Malmö Stadion, Malmö
Attendance: 5,683
Referee: Alan Snoddy (Northern Ireland)

17 September 1986

Bursaspor (Turkey)	0–2	(Netherlands) Ajax
	Report	Bosman 73'; Van Basten 86'

Bursa Atatürk Stadyumu, Bursa
Attendance: 6,500
Referee: Pavel Kuznetsov (Soviet Union)

17 September 1986

Olympiacos (Greece)	3–0	Union Luxembourg
Anastopoulos 1', 47' (pen.); Togias 55'	Report

Olympic Stadium, Athens
Attendance: 28,543
Referee: Plarent Kotherja (Albania)

17 September 1986

Benfica (Portugal)	2–0	(Norway) Lillestrøm
Manniche 21'; Chiquinho 54'	Report

Estádio da Luz, Lisbon
Attendance: 30,000
Referee: Roger Philippi (Luxembourg)

17 September 1986

Waterford United (Republic of Ireland)	1–2	(France) Bordeaux
Synnott 89'	Report	Girard 33'; Vercruysse 61'

Kilcohan Park, Waterford
Attendance: 4,462
Referee: Alex Jacobsen (Denmark)

17 September 1986

Haka (Finland)	2–2	(Soviet Union) Torpedo Moscow
Paatelainen 38'; Törnvall 82'	Report	Kobzev 22'; N. Savichev 65'

Tehtaan kenttä, Valkeakoski
Attendance: 1,595
Referee: Manfred Roßner (East Germany)

17 September 1986

VfB Stuttgart (West Germany)	1–0	(Czechoslovakia) Spartak Trnava
K. Allgöwer 88' (pen.)	Report

Neckarstadion, Stuttgart
Attendance: 24,250
Referee: José dos Santos (Portugal)

17 September 1986

Rapid Wien (Austria)	4–3	(Belgium) Club Brugge
Kienast 44', 56'; Brauneder 46'; Willfurth 47'	Report	Rosenthal 36'; Beyens 61'; Van Wijk 71'

Gerhard Hanappi Stadium, Vienna
Attendance: 11,000
Referee: André Daina (Switzerland)

17 September 1986

Glentoran (Northern Ireland)	1–1	(East Germany) Lokomotive Leipzig
Cleary 43'	Report	Lindner 66'

The Oval, Belfast
Attendance: 2,472
Referee: Thorbjørn Aas (Norway)

16 September 1986

Fram Reykjavík (Iceland)	0–3	(Poland) Katowice
	Report	Koniarek 24', 65'; Kubisztal 84'

Laugardalsvöllur, Reykjavík
Attendance: 1,094
Referee: Ffrangcon Roberts (Wales)

17 September 1986

Aberdeen (Scotland)	2–1	(Switzerland) Sion
Bett 73' (pen.); Wright 81'	Report	Débonnaire 40'

Pittodrie Stadium, Aberdeen
Attendance: 12,312
Referee: Einar Halle (Norway)

=== Second leg ===
1 October 1986

Zaragoza (Spain)	2–0 (a.e.t.)	(Italy) Roma
Señor 44' (pen.), 46' (pen.)	Report
Penalties
García Cortés (penalty missed); Mejías (penalty scored); Yáñez (penalty scored); Ayneto (penalty scored); Señor (penalty scored)	4–3	(penalty scored) Desideri; (penalty scored) Giannini; (penalty scored) Baroni; (penalty missed) Boniek; (penalty missed) Ancelotti

La Romareda, Zaragoza
Attendance: 38,000
Referee: George Courtney (England)

2–2 on aggregate; Zaragoza won 4–3 on penalties.

1 October 1986

Wrexham (Wales)	4–0	(Malta) Żurrieq
Massey 10' (pen.), 40'; Steel 36'; Horne 87'	Report

Racecourse Ground, Wrexham
Attendance: 2,793
Referee: Oli Olsen (Iceland)

Wrexham won 7–0 on aggregate.

1 October 1986

Vitosha Sofia (Bulgaria)	2–0	(Denmark) B 1903
Iskrenov 75'; Sirakov 85'	Report

Vasil Levski Stadium, Sofia
Attendance: 27,500
Referee: Egon Šoštarić (Yugoslavia)

Vitosha Sofia won 2–1 on aggregate.

1 October 1986

Velež Mostar (Socialist Federal Republic of Yugoslavia)	3–2	(Hungary) Vasas
P. Jurić 55', 72'; Tuce 76'	Report	Csorba 80', 89'

Gradski Stadium, Mostar
Attendance: 15,000
Referee: Franz Wöhrer (Austria)

Velež Mostar won 5–4 on aggregate.

1 October 1986

Dinamo București (Romania)	1–2	(Albania) 17 Nëntori
Cămătaru 80'	Report	Minga 2'; Josa 89'

Dinamo Stadium, Bucharest
Attendance: 13,756
Referee: Sotos Afxentiou (Cyprus)

17 Nëntori won 3–1 on aggregate.

1 October 1986

Apollon Limassol (Cyprus)	2–1	(Sweden) Malmö FF
Christodoulou 42', 45'	Report	Lindman 13'

Tsirio Stadium, Limassol
Attendance: 7,000
Referee: Ştefan Dan Petrescu (Romania)

Malmö FF won 7–2 on aggregate.

1 October 1986

Ajax (Netherlands)	5–0	(Turkey) Bursaspor
Bosman 17', 21', 34', 89'; Van Basten 24'	Report

De Meer Stadion, Amsterdam
Attendance: 18,044
Referee: Ildefonso Urizar Azpitarte (Spain)

Ajax won 7–0 on aggregate.

1 October 1986

Union Luxembourg	0–3	(Greece) Olympiacos
	Report	Papachristou 53'; Zelelidis 84'; Anastopoulos 89'

Stade Achille Hammerel, Luxembourg
Attendance: 1,173
Referee: Ignace Goris (Belgium)

Olympiacos won 6–0 on aggregate.

1 October 1986

Lillestrøm (Norway)	1–2	(Portugal) Benfica
Sundby 2'	Report	Diamantino 25'; Bjerkeland 76' (o.g.)

Ullevaal Stadion, Oslo
Attendance: 7,750
Referee: Henning Lund-Sørensen (Denmark)

Benfica won 4–1 on aggregate.

30 September 1986

Bordeaux (France)	4–0	(Republic of Ireland) Waterford United
Zo. Vujović 79'; Zl. Vujović 85'; Reinders 86'; Vercruysse 90'	Report

Stade Chaban-Delmas, Bordeaux
Attendance: 9,070
Referee: René Bindels (Luxembourg)

Bordeaux won 6–1 on aggregate.

1 October 1986

Torpedo Moscow (Soviet Union)	3–1	(Finland) Haka
Y. Savichev 21'; Kruglov 38'; Gostenin 67'	Report	Prigoda 70' (o.g.)

Central Lenin Stadium, Moscow
Attendance: 5,000
Referee: Bo Helén (Sweden)

Torpedo Moscow won 5–3 on aggregate.

1 October 1986

Spartak Trnava (Czechoslovakia)	0–0	(West Germany) VfB Stuttgart
	Report

Štadión Antona Malatinského, Trnava
Attendance: 13,120
Referee: Gerard Geurds (Netherlands)

VfB Stuttgart won 1–0 on aggregate.

1 October 1986

Club Brugge (Belgium)	3–3	(Austria) Rapid Wien
Brylle 41'; Rosenthal 54'; Van Wijk 88'	Report	Kranjčar 53'; Weinhofer 57'; Halilović 81'

Jan Breydelstadion, Brugge
Attendance: 20,914
Referee: Werner Föckler (West Germany)

Rapid Wien won 7–6 on aggregate.

1 October 1986

Lokomotive Leipzig (East Germany)	2–0	(Northern Ireland) Glentoran
Bredow 36'; Richter 90'	Report

Bruno-Plache-Stadion, Leipzig
Attendance: 7,200
Referee: Bo Karlsson (Sweden)

Lokomotive Leipzig won 3–1 on aggregate.

2 October 1986

Katowice (Poland)	1–0	(Iceland) Fram Reykjavík
Koniarek 82'	Report

Stadion Śląski, Chorzów
Attendance: 14,727
Referee: Yusuf Namoğlu (Turkey)

Katowice won 4–0 on aggregate.

1 October 1986

Sion (Switzerland)	3–0	(Scotland) Aberdeen
Leighton 5' (o.g.); Bouderbala 29'; Brigger 88'	Report

Stade Tourbillon, Sion
Attendance: 11,807
Referee: Bep Thomas (Netherlands)

Sion won 4–2 on aggregate.

== Second round ==
Team 1	Agg.	Team 2	1st leg	2nd leg
Zaragoza (Spain)	2–2 (a)	(Wales) Wrexham	0–0	2–2 (aet)
Vitosha Sofia (Bulgaria)	5–4	(Socialist Federal Republic of Yugoslavia) Velež Mostar	2–0	3–4
17 Nëntori (Albania)	0–3	(Sweden) Malmö FF	0–3	0–0
Ajax (Netherlands)	5–1	(Greece) Olympiacos	4–0	1–1
Benfica (Portugal)	1–2	(France) Bordeaux	1–1	0–1
Torpedo Moscow (Soviet Union)	7–3	(West Germany) VfB Stuttgart	2–0	5–3
Rapid Wien (Austria)	2–3	(East Germany) Lokomotive Leipzig	1–1	1–2 (aet)
Katowice (Poland)	2–5	(Switzerland) Sion	2–2	0–3

=== First leg ===
22 October 1986

Zaragoza (Spain)	0–0	(Wales) Wrexham
	Report

La Romareda, Zaragoza
Attendance: 27,000
Referee: Gérard Biguet (France)

22 October 1986

Vitosha Sofia (Bulgaria)	2–0	(Socialist Federal Republic of Yugoslavia) Velež Mostar
Yordanov 54'; Sirakov 68'	Report

Vasil Levski Stadium, Sofia
Attendance: 28,820
Referee: Aleksander Suchanek (Poland)

22 October 1986

17 Nëntori (Albania)	0–3	(Sweden) Malmö FF
	Report	Magnusson 47'; Larsson 60'; Persson 83' (pen.)

Qemal Stafa Stadium, Tirana
Attendance: 19,500
Referee: Bep Thomas (Netherlands)

22 October 1986

Ajax (Netherlands)	4–0	(Greece) Olympiacos
Bosman 6'; Rijkaard 44'; Van Basten 52'; Mühren 83'	Report

De Meer Stadion, Amsterdam
Attendance: 21,981
Referee: Siegfried Kirschen (East Germany)

22 October 1986

Benfica (Portugal)	1–1	(France) Bordeaux
Águas 31'	Report	Zl. Vujović 18'

Estádio da Luz, Lisbon
Attendance: 60,000
Referee: Franz Wöhrer (Austria)

22 October 1986

Torpedo Moscow (Soviet Union)	2–0	(West Germany) VfB Stuttgart
N. Savichev 31'; Y. Savichev 72'	Report

Torpedo Stadium, Moscow
Attendance: 12,300
Referee: Neil Midgley (England)

22 October 1986

Rapid Wien (Austria)	1–1	(East Germany) Lokomotive Leipzig
Kranjčar 60'	Report	Lindner 38'

Gerhard Hanappi Stadium, Vienna
Attendance: 16,000
Referee: Gerard Geurds (Netherlands)

22 October 1986

Katowice (Poland)	2–2	(Switzerland) Sion
Koniarek 10', 12'	Report	Brigger 74'; Cina 78'

Stadion Śląski, Chorzów
Attendance: 10,176
Referee: Meletis Voutsaras (Greece)

=== Second leg ===
5 November 1986

Wrexham (Wales)	2–2 (a.e.t.)	(Spain) Zaragoza
Massey 102'; Buxton 107'	Report	Yáñez 97', 104'

Racecourse Ground, Wrexham
Attendance: 14,550
Referee: Ulf Eriksson (Sweden)

2–2 on aggregate; Zaragoza won on away goals.

5 November 1986

Velež Mostar (Socialist Federal Republic of Yugoslavia)	4–3	(Bulgaria) Vitosha Sofia
Tuce 44', 84'; Gudelj 86'; Matijević 88'	Report	Iskrenov 42'; Sirakov 66', 71'

Gradski Stadium, Mostar
Attendance: 18,000
Referee: Yuri Savchenko (Soviet Union)

Vitosha Sofia won 5–4 on aggregate.

5 November 1986

Malmö FF (Sweden)	0–0	(Albania) 17 Nëntori
	Report

Malmö Stadion, Malmö
Attendance: 3,170
Referee: Jiří Stiegler (Czechoslovakia)

Malmö FF won 3–0 on aggregate.

5 November 1986

Olympiacos (Greece)	1–1	(Netherlands) Ajax
Kapouranis 58'	Report	Wouters 90'

Olympic Stadium, Athens
Attendance: 21,000
Referee: Ioan Igna (Romania)

Ajax won 5–1 on aggregate.

5 November 1986

Bordeaux (France)	1–0	(Portugal) Benfica
Vercruysse 43'	Report

Stade Parc Lescure, Bordeaux
Attendance: 21,159
Referee: Karl-Heinz Tritschler (West Germany)

Bordeaux won 2–1 on aggregate.

5 November 1986

VfB Stuttgart (West Germany)	3–5	(Soviet Union) Torpedo Moscow
Klinsmann 17'; Pašić 31'; Sigurvinsson 55'	Report	N. Savichev 11', 89'; Y. Savichev 13', 37'; Plotnikov 28'

Neckarstadion, Stuttgart
Attendance: 30,050
Referee: Henning Lund-Sørensen (Denmark)

Torpedo Moscow won 7–3 on aggregate.

5 November 1986

Lokomotive Leipzig (East Germany)	2–1 (a.e.t.)	(Austria) Rapid Wien
Richter 71'; Leitzke 118'	Report	Kienast 67'

Zentralstadion, Leipzig
Attendance: 19,300
Referee: Claudio Pieri (Italy)

Lokomotive Leipzig won 3–2 on aggregate.

5 November 1986

Sion (Switzerland)	3–0	(Poland) Katowice
Bregy 57' (pen.); Cina 58'; Brigger 82'	Report

Stade de Tourbillon, Sion
Attendance: 9,950
Referee: Vitor Fernandes (Portugal)

Sion won 5–2 on aggregate.

== Quarter-finals ==
Team 1	Agg.	Team 2	1st leg	2nd leg
Zaragoza (Spain)	4–0	(Bulgaria) Vitosha Sofia	2–0	2–0
Malmö FF (Sweden)	2–3	(Netherlands) Ajax	1–0	1–3
Bordeaux (France)	3–3 (a)	(Soviet Union) Torpedo Moscow	1–0	2–3
Lokomotive Leipzig (East Germany)	2–0	(Switzerland) Sion	2–0	0–0

=== First leg ===
4 March 1987

Zaragoza (Spain)	2–0	(Bulgaria) Vitosha Sofia
Roberto 55'; García Cortés 77'	Report

La Romareda, Zaragoza
Attendance: 11,666
Referee: Marcel Van Langenhove (Belgium)

14 March 1987

Malmö FF (Sweden)	1–0	(Netherlands) Ajax
Persson 43' (pen.)	Report

Malmö Stadion, Malmö
Attendance: 20,186
Referee: George Smith (Scotland)

4 March 1987

Bordeaux (France)	1–0	(Soviet Union) Torpedo Moscow
Fargeon 57'	Report

Stade Chaban-Delmas, Bordeaux
Attendance: 22,627
Referee: Claudio Pieri (Italy)

4 March 1987

Lokomotive Leipzig (East Germany)	2–0	(Switzerland) Sion
Marschall 87'; Richter 90'	Report

Zentralstadion, Leipzig
Attendance: 21,000
Referee: Henning Lund-Sørensen (Denmark)

=== Second leg ===
18 March 1987

Vitosha Sofia (Bulgaria)	0–2	(Spain) Zaragoza
	Report	Mejías 33'; Roberto 82'

Vasil Levski Stadium, Sofia
Attendance: 40,000
Referee: Horst Brummeier (Austria)

Zaragoza won 4–0 on aggregate.

18 March 1987

Ajax (Netherlands)	3–1	(Sweden) Malmö FF
Van Basten 23', 72'; Winter 61'	Report	Lindman 81'

De Meer Stadion, Amsterdam
Attendance: 24,775
Referee: Dieter Pauly (West Germany)

Ajax won 3–2 on aggregate.

18 March 1987

Torpedo Moscow (Soviet Union)	3–2	(France) Bordeaux
Agashkov 49' (pen.), 71' (pen.); Shirinbekov 62'	Report	Touré 39' (pen.), 60'

Vladimir Ilyich Lenin Dinamo Stadium, Tbilisi
Attendance: 49,600
Referee: Bruno Galler (Switzerland)

3–3 on aggregate; Bordeaux won on away goals.

18 March 1987

Sion (Switzerland)	0–0	(East Germany) Lokomotive Leipzig
	Report

Stade de Tourbillon, Sion
Attendance: 12,200
Referee: Ioan Igna (Romania)

Lokomotive Leipzig won 2–0 on aggregate.

== Semi-finals ==
Team 1	Agg.	Team 2	1st leg	2nd leg
Zaragoza (Spain)	2–6	(Netherlands) Ajax	2–3	0–3
Bordeaux (France)	1–1 (5–6 p)	(East Germany) Lokomotive Leipzig	0–1	1–0 (aet)

=== First leg ===
8 April 1987

Zaragoza (Spain)	2–3	(Netherlands) Ajax
Sosa 13'; Señor 71' (pen.)	Report	Ro. Witschge 16'; Bosman 47', 55'

La Romareda, Zaragoza
Attendance: 35,000
Referee: Zoran Petrović (Yugoslavia)

8 April 1987

Bordeaux (France)	0–1	(East Germany) Lokomotive Leipzig
	Report	Bredow 64'

Stade Chaban-Delmas, Bordeaux
Attendance: 37,082
Referee: Horst Brummeier (Austria)

=== Second leg ===
22 April 1987

Ajax (Netherlands)	3–0	(Spain) Zaragoza
Van 't Schip 17'; Ro. Witschge 72'; Rijkaard 90'	Report

Olympic Stadium, Amsterdam
Attendance: 47,916
Referee: Franz Wöhrer (Austria)

Ajax won 6–2 on aggregate.

22 April 1987

Lokomotive Leipzig (East Germany)	0–1 (a.e.t.)	(France) Bordeaux
	Report	Zl. Vujović 3'
Penalties
Lindner (penalty scored); M. Liebers (penalty missed); Marschall (penalty scored); Zötzsche (penalty scored); Kühn (penalty scored); Altmann (penalty scored); Müller (penalty scored)	6–5	(penalty scored) Touré; (penalty missed) Vercruysse; (penalty scored) Rohr; (penalty scored) Girard; (penalty scored) Roche; (penalty scored) Tigana; (penalty missed) Zo. Vujović

Zentralstadion, Leipzig
Attendance: 73,000
Referee: George Courtney (England)

1–1 on aggregate; Lokomotive Leipzig won 6–5 on penalties.

== Final ==
13 May 1987
21:15 EEST

Ajax (Netherlands)	1–0	(East Germany) Lokomotive Leipzig
Van Basten 21'	Report

Olympic Stadium, Athens
Attendance: 35,107
Referee: Luigi Agnolin (Italy)

== Top scorers ==
Name	Team	Goals
(Netherlands) John Bosman	(Netherlands) Ajax	8
(Netherlands) Marco van Basten	(Netherlands) Ajax	6
(Poland) Marek Koniarek	(Poland) GKS Katowice	5
(Sweden) Lars Larsson	(Sweden) Malmö FF	4
(England) Steve Massey	(Wales) Wrexham	4
(Soviet Union) Nikolai Savichev	(Soviet Union) Torpedo Moscow	4
(Soviet Union) Yuri Savichev	(Soviet Union) Torpedo Moscow	4
(Bulgaria) Nasko Sirakov	(Bulgaria) Vitosha Sofia	4
(Socialist Federal Republic of Yugoslavia) Semir Tuce	(Socialist Federal Republic of Yugoslavia) Velež Mostar	4
(Socialist Federal Republic of Yugoslavia) Zlatko Vujović	(France) Bordeaux	4

== See also ==
- 1986–87 European Cup
- 1986–87 UEFA Cup
