= 1987 European Cup Winners' Cup final =

- Match programme cover
- Event: 1986–87 European Cup Winners' Cup
| Ajax | 1. FC Lokomotive Leipzig |
| (Netherlands) | (East Germany) |
| 1 | 0 |
- Date: 13 May 1987
- Venue: Olympic Stadium, Athens
- Referee: Luigi Agnolin (Italy)
- Attendance: 35,000

The 1987 European Cup Winners' Cup Final was a football match contested between Ajax of Netherlands and 1. FC Lokomotive Leipzig of East Germany. It was the final match of the 1986–87 European Cup Winners' Cup and the 27th European Cup Winners' Cup final. The final was held at Olympic Stadium in Athens, Greece. Ajax won the match 1–0 with a 20th-minute header from Marco van Basten.

== Route to the final ==
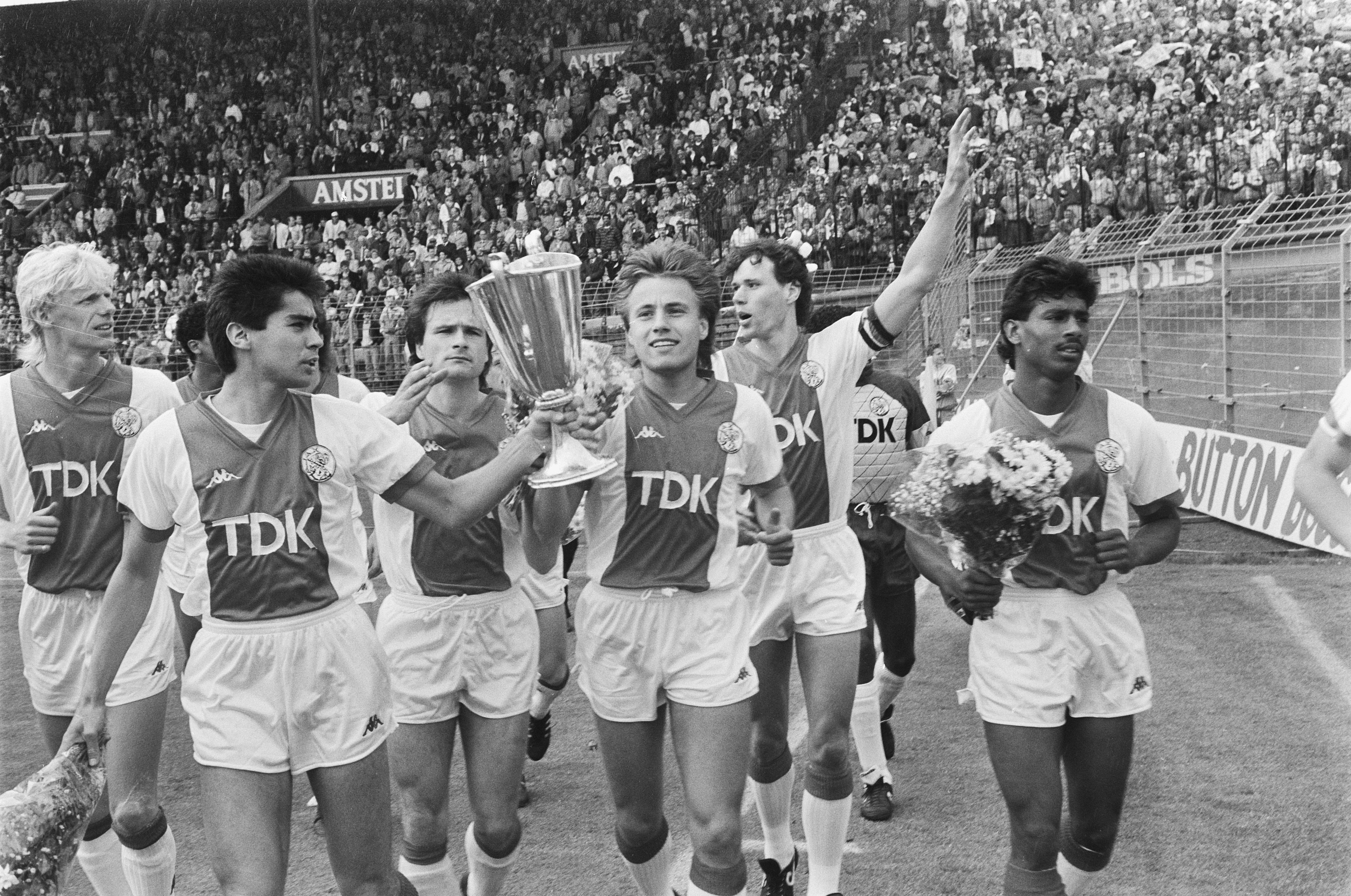
Ajax players celebrating the victory

| (Netherlands) Ajax | | | | | (East Germany) 1. FC Lokomotive Leipzig | | | |
|---|---|---|---|---|---|---|---|---|
| Opponent | Agg. | 1st leg | 2nd leg | | Opponent | Agg. | 1st leg | 2nd leg |
| (Turkey) Bursaspor | 7–0 | 2–0 (A) | 5–0 (H) | First round | (Northern Ireland) Glentoran | 3–1 | 1–1 (A) | 2–0 (H) |
| (Greece) Olympiacos | 5–1 | 4–0 (H) | 1–1 (A) | Second round | (Austria) Rapid Wien | 3–2 | 1–1 (A) | 2–1 (aet) (H) |
| (Sweden) Malmö FF | 3–1 | 0–1 (A) | 3–0 (H) | Quarter-finals | (Switzerland) Sion | 2–0 | 2–0 (H) | 0–0 (A) |
| (Spain) Zaragoza | 6–2 | 3–2 (A) | 3–0 (H) | Semi-finals | (France) Bordeaux | 1–1 (6–5 p) | 1–0 (A) | 0–1 (aet) (H) |

== Match ==
=== Details ===
13 May 1987
21:15 EEST

| Ajax (Netherlands) | 1–0 | (East Germany) 1. FC Lokomotive Leipzig |
|---|---|---|
| Van Basten 20' | Report |

Olympic Stadium, Athens
Attendance: 35,000
Referee: Luigi Agnolin (Italy)

| Ajax | 1. FC Lokomotive Leipzig |

| GK | 1 | (Netherlands) Stanley Menzo |
| RB | 2 | (Netherlands) Sonny Silooy |
| CB | 3 | (Netherlands) Frank Verlaat |
| CB | 4 | (Netherlands) Frank Rijkaard |
| LB | 5 | (Netherlands) Peter Boeve |
| CM | 6 | (Netherlands) Aron Winter |
| CM | 8 | (Netherlands) Jan Wouters |
| CM | 10 | (Netherlands) Arnold Mühren | (substituted off) 83' |
| RF | 7 | (Netherlands) John van 't Schip |
| CF | 9 | (Netherlands) Marco van Basten (c) |
| LF | 11 | (Netherlands) Rob Witschge | (substituted off) 66' |
Substitutes:
| GK | 12 | (Netherlands) Erik de Haan |
| DF | 13 | (Netherlands) Ronald Spelbos |
| MF | 14 | (Finland) Petri Tiainen |
| FW | 15 | (Netherlands) Dennis Bergkamp | (substituted on) 66' |
| MF | 16 | (Netherlands) Arnold Scholten | (substituted on) 83' |
Manager:
(Netherlands) Johan Cruyff

| GK | 1 | (East Germany) René Müller |
| RB | 2 | (East Germany) Ronald Kreer |
| CB | 4 | (East Germany) Matthias Lindner |
| CB | 3 | (East Germany) Frank Baum (c) |
| LB | 5 | (East Germany) Uwe Zötzsche |
| RM | 7 | (East Germany) Heiko Scholz |
| CM | 6 | (East Germany) Uwe Bredow |
| CM | 9 | (East Germany) Frank Edmond | (substituted off) 55' |
| LM | 8 | (East Germany) Matthias Liebers | (substituted off) 76' |
| CF | 10 | (East Germany) Hans Richter |
| CF | 11 | (East Germany) Olaf Marschall |
Substitutes:
| GK | 16 | (East Germany) Maik Kischko |
| DF | 12 | (East Germany) Torsten Kracht |
| MF | 13 | (East Germany) Hans-Jörg Leitzke | (substituted on) 55' |
| MF | 14 | (East Germany) Wolfgang Altmann |
| FW | 15 | (East Germany) Dieter Kühn | (substituted on) 76' |
Manager:
(East Germany) Hans-Ulrich Thomale

Assistant referees:
Carlo Longhi (Italy)
Maurizio Mattei (Italy)

Match rules

- 90 minutes.
- 30 minutes of extra time if necessary.
- Penalty shoot-out if scores still level.
- Five named substitutes.
- Maximum of two substitutions.

== See also ==
- 1986–87 European Cup Winners' Cup
- 1987 European Cup Final
- 1987 UEFA Cup Final
- AFC Ajax in international football competitions
