= 1988–89 Nemzeti Bajnokság I =

Nemzeti Bajnokság I
- Season: 1988–89
- Champions: Budapest Honvéd
- Relegated: Zalaegerszeg; Dunaújvárosi Kohász
- European Cup: Budapest Honvéd
- Cup Winners' Cup: Ferencváros
- UEFA Cup: MTK-VM; Ferencváros
- Matches: 240
- Goals: 606 (2.53 per match)
- Top goalscorer: Tamás Petres (19)

Statistics of Nemzeti Bajnokság I for the 1988–89 season.

== Overview ==
16 teams participated and Budapest Honvéd FC won the championship for a second consecutive season. The Hungarian Football Federation (MLSZ) decided to eliminate draws for this season, and matches ending without a winner carried on to penalties. The winner of the penalty-shootout were given 2 points, while the loser received 1 points for participating.

The red and blacks started off the season with a draw, and three consecutive defeats. Although they would return to winning ways, going on a 10-game undefeated streak, a 3-0 defeat to MTK on the last gameday of the autumn season caused the club to terminate Bertalan Bicskei's contract, who had led the team to a national title the season prior. His replacement was József Both.

MTK on the other hand were having one of the seasons of theirs, standing atop the table with 9 victories and a single defeat by half-time. However, consecutive losses to Zalaegerszeg, Békéscsaba and Pécs enabled Honvéd to catch-up with MTK. Going into the last game of the season, the two teams were joint on points. Honvéd and MTK played each other in a one-legged final to decide the champion, and Kispest overcame MTK 2-0, winning their 11th championship.

== League standings ==
Pos	Team	Pld	W	PKW	PKL	L	GF	GA	GD	Pts	Qualification or relegation
1	Budapest Honvéd (C)	30	16	6	1	7	44	28	+16	61	Qualification for European Cup first round
2	Ferencváros	30	16	4	3	7	49	29	+20	59	Qualification for Cup Winners' Cup first round
3	MTK-VM	30	13	8	3	6	41	34	+7	58	Qualification for UEFA Cup first round
4	Videoton	30	17	1	4	8	57	32	+25	57	Qualification for UEFA Cup first round
5	Győr	30	16	3	2	9	44	31	+13	56	
6	Tatabányai Bányász	30	12	3	6	9	39	35	+4	48	
7	Békéscsaba	30	12	4	2	12	40	36	+4	46	
8	Váci Izzo	30	10	5	5	10	33	34	−1	45	
9	Újpesti Dózsa	30	11	2	4	13	37	35	+2	41	
10	Veszprém	30	9	6	2	13	23	35	−12	41	
11	Pécs	30	9	3	7	11	35	37	−2	40	
12	Siófoki Bányász	30	8	4	6	12	34	41	−7	38	
13	Haladás (O)	30	7	5	4	14	31	44	−13	35	Qualification for relegation play-offs
14	Vasas (O)	30	8	2	7	13	35	58	−23	35	Qualification for relegation play-offs
15	Zalaegerszeg (R)	30	7	4	5	14	37	44	−7	34	Relegation to Nemzeti Bajnokság II
16	Dunaújvárosi Kohász (R)	30	3	6	5	16	27	53	−26	26	Relegation to Nemzeti Bajnokság II

Source: rsssf.com
Rules for classification: 3 points were awarded for a victory; in case of a draw, a penalty shoot out was held with the winner of that getting 2 and the loser 1 point.
(C) Champion; (O) Play-off winner; (R) Relegated

== Results ==
Results in brackets indicate the results from penalty shoot-outs whenever games were drawn.

Home \ Away	BÉK	DUN	FTC	GYŐ	HAL	HON	MTK	PÉC	SIÓ	TAT	ÚJP	VAS	VÁC	VES	VID	ZTE
Békéscsaba		3–1	0–0^{(4–5)}	1–2	2–1	0–1	3–2	1–2	2–0	1–0	1–2	7–2	2–0	1–0	1–0	5–2
Dunaújvárosi Kohász	0–0^{(2–4)}		0–2	0–1	2–4	0–0^{(6–5)}	0–1	3–1	2–3	2–2^{(3–1)}	0–0^{(4–5)}	1–1^{(3–2)}	0–2	0–0^{(7–8)}	4–2	1–1^{(5–6)}
Ferencváros	0–2	2–0		2–1	0–0^{(3–4)}	0–3	1–0	3–3^{(4–2)}	1–1^{(4–5)}	0–0^{(10–9)}	3–0	4–0	3–2	3–1	2–1	5–0
Győr	2–0	1–0	1–0		1–0	4–0	1–2	1–0	5–2	1–1^{(3–4)}	0–3	4–2	2–1	0–1	0–3	3–2
Haladás	2–0	1–2	2–2^{(0–2)}	1–1^{(3–4)}		1–3	0–0^{(4–5)}	2–2^{(4–3)}	1–0	1–0	0–4	1–2	3–1	2–0	1–2	2–0
Budapest Honvéd	0–0^{(3–2)}	3–0	2–1	0–1	2–0		2–0	1–1^{(5–3)}	3–1	2–1	1–0	2–2^{(5–4)}	2–0	1–0	2–1	1–1^{(4–2)}
MTK-VM	2–1	1–0	2–0	1–0	2–0	3–0		2–2^{(5–3)}	1–1^{(4–5)}	3–3^{(2–4)}	2–1	1–1^{(4–3)}	4–0	1–0	1–1^{(5–3)}	2–2^{(4–1)}
Pécs	4–2	2–1	0–1	0–2	0–0^{(5–3)}	1–0	2–0		2–0	1–2	2–0	2–1	1–1^{(4–5)}	1–2	0–3	0–0^{(4–5)}
Siófoki Bányász	4–3	3–0	0–1	0–2	2–1	1–1^{(3–4)}	1–1^{(4–5)}	1–1^{(3–4)}		0–1	1–1^{(5–3)}	4–1	0–2	1–1^{(2–4)}	1–1^{(3–4)}	1–0
Tatabányai Bányász	3–1	5–1	2–1	0–0^{(2–4)}	2–2^{(4–5)}	1–0	1–1^{(3–4)}	1–0	1–0		1–0	2–3	0–0^{(5–6)}	1–1^{(3–1)}	1–3	1–0
Újpesti Dózsa	3–0	3–3^{(2–4)}	0–2	2–4	2–1	1–0	1–2	2–1	0–1	2–0		1–1^{(4–5)}	1–0	2–0	2–3	2–1
Vasas	0–0^{(4–5)}	0–0^{(3–5)}	2–3	2–0	2–0	0–4	1–3	1–2	1–0	0–3	0–0^{(4–5)}		1–1^{(2–1)}	0–1	3–2	2–0
Váci Izzo	1–0	0–0^{(3–5)}	2–1	1–0	0–0^{(2–4)}	2–2^{(3–4)}	1–1^{(2–4)}	0–0^{(5–3)}	3–0	1–3	1–1^{(5–4)}	2–2^{(4–2)}		2–0	2–0	0–3
Veszprém	0–0^{(2–3)}	2–2^{(4–3)}	0–2	1–1^{(5–3)}	3–1	0–1	0–0^{(6–5)}	1–0	1–1^{(4–2)}	2–1	2–1	0–2	0–3		1–3	1–0
Videoton	0–1	4–1	0–0^{(4–5)}	2–2^{(3–4)}	4–0	3–1	4–0	1–0	1–4	3–0	1–0	4–0	1–0	1–0		1–0
Zalaegerszeg	0–0^{(6–5)}	2–0	2–4	1–0	1–1^{(3–4)}	2–4	4–0	2–2^{(3–4)}	0–0^{(5–6)}	3–0	1–0	4–0	1–2	1–2	2–2^{(4–3)}	

Source: rsssf.com
Legend: Blue = home team win; Yellow = draw; Red = away team win.

== Relegation play-offs ==
Team 1	Agg.	Team 2	1st leg	2nd leg
Oroszlányi Bányász (II)	3–4	Haladás (I)	2–0	1–4
Vasas (I)	2–1	Szeged (II)	1–1	1–0

== Statistical leaders ==
=== Top goalscorers ===
Rank	Scorer	Club	Goals
1	(Hungary) Tamás Petres	Videoton SC	19
2	(Hungary) László Szabadi	Vasas SC	16
3	(Hungary) Pál Fischer	Ferencvárosi TC	13
3	(Hungary) Attila Kámán	Zalaegerszegi TE	13
5	(Hungary) Imre Fodor	Budapest Honvéd	11
5	(Hungary) Béla Mörtel	Győri ETO FC	11
7	(Hungary) Róbert Jován	Videoton	10
7	(Hungary) József Kiprich	Tatabányai Bányász	10
9	(Hungary) Gábor Balogh	Váci Izzó	9
9	(Hungary) Csucsánszky Zoltán	Videoton SC	9
9	(Hungary) József Gregor	Budapest Honvéd	9
9	(Hungary) György Handel	Győri ETO FC	9
9	(Hungary) Gábor Pölöskei	MTK-VM	9

== Attendances ==
No.	Club	Average	Highest
1	Ferencváros	17,067	30,000
2	Videoton	9,267	20,000
3	Rába ETO Győr	8,733	18,000
4	Békéscsaba	8,333	18,000
5	Pécsi Dózsa	7,800	15,000
6	Haladás	6,800	20,000
7	Budapest Honvéd	6,567	20,000
8	Vác FC	6,567	10,000
9	Veszprém	6,267	10,000
10	Tatabányai Bányász	5,633	12,000
11	MTK-VM	5,400	20,000
12	Siófoki Bányász	5,133	13,000
13	Vasas	4,500	13,000
14	Újpesti Dózsa	4,440	25,000
15	Zalaegerszeg	4,353	8,000
16	Dunaújvárosi Kohász	3,933	10,000
