= List of Fehérvár FC records and statistics =

Fehérvár Football Club is a professional Hungarian football club based in Székesfehérvár, Hungary.

== Player ==
=== Most appearances ===
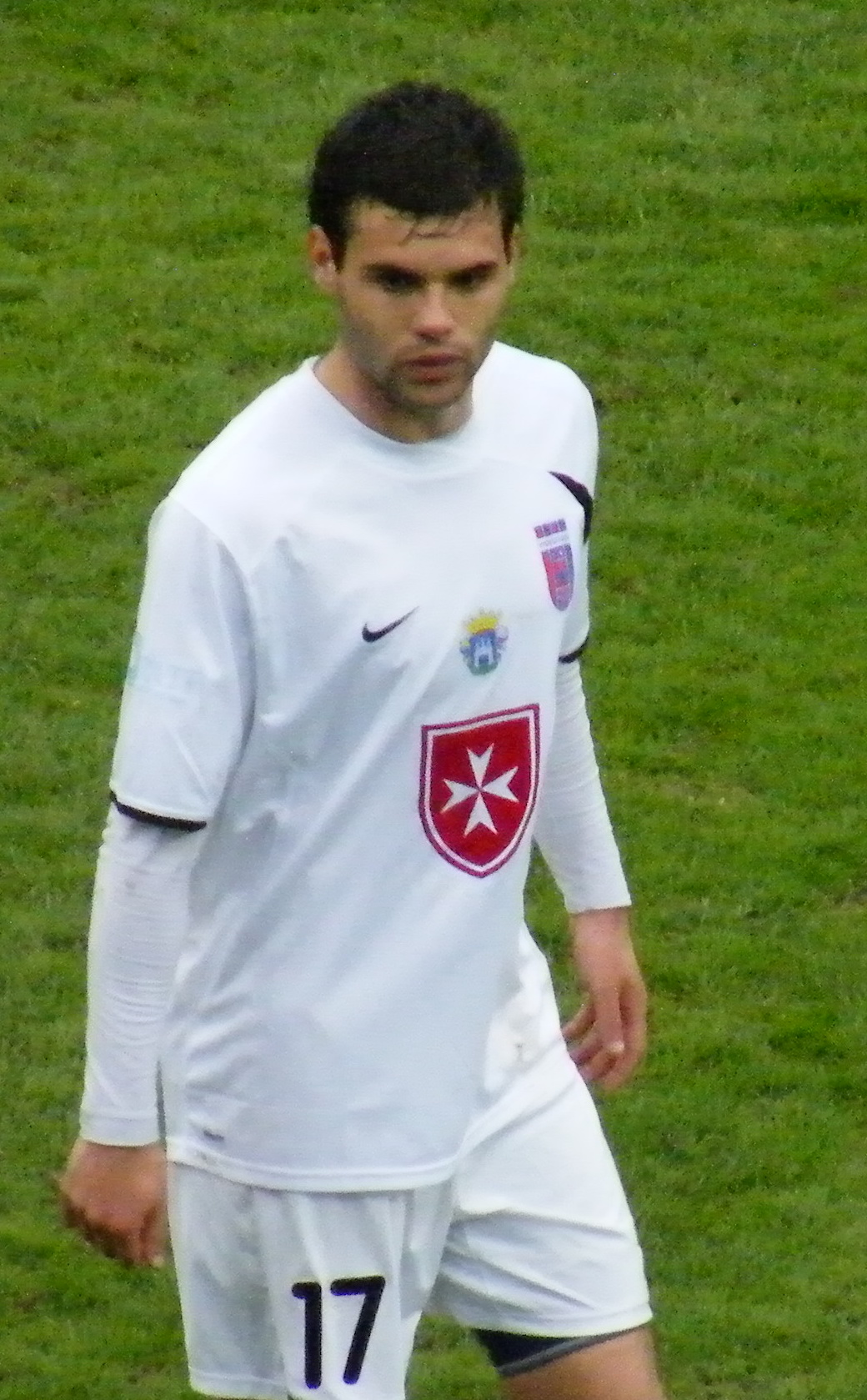
Nemanja Nikolić, three-time top scorer of the Nemzeti Bajnokság I

No.	Name	Years 1974–1989	Total
1.	(Hungary)	Tibor Végh	420

=== Top scorers ===
Season	Player	Goals
1983–84	(Hungary) József Szabó	19
1988–89	(Hungary) Tamás Petres	19
2009–10	(Hungary) Nemanja Nikolić	18
2010–11	(Brazil) André Alves	24
2013–14	(Hungary) Nemanja Nikolić	18
2014–15	(Hungary) Nemanja Nikolić	21

=== Record departures ===
	Player	To	Fee	Year
1.	(Hungary) Ádám Lang	(France) Dijon FCO	€900 000	2016–17
2.	(Spain) Walter Fernández	(Belgium) KSC Lokeren	€700 000	2012
3.	(Hungary) Pál Lázár	(Turkey) Samsunspor	€600 000	2011
4.	(Hungary) Péter Simek	(Romania) Politehnica Știința Timișoara	€400 000	2006

=== Record arrivals ===
	Player	From	Fee	Year
1.	(Bosnia and Herzegovina) Armin Hodžić	(Croatia) Dinamo Zagreb	€2,160,000	2018–19
2.	(Hungary) László Lencse	(Hungary) MTK Budapest FC	€720,000	2009–10
3.	(Hungary) András Gosztonyi	(Hungary) Szombathelyi Haladás	€675,000	2010–11

=== Most valuable arrivals ===
	Player	From	Fee	Year
1.	(Bosnia and Herzegovina) Armin Hodžić	(Croatia) Dinamo Zagreb	€1,800,000	2018–19
2.	(Hungary) Roland Juhász	(Belgium) RSC Anderlecht	€1,800,000	2013–14
3.	(Bulgaria) Georgi Milanov	(Russia) CSKA Moscow	€1,350,000	2018–19

== Team records ==
=== Nemzeti Bajnokság I ===
- First Nemzeti Bajnokság I match:
- First Magyar Kupa match:
- Biggest win: Videoton 7–0 Szombathelyi Haladás (2014–15 Nemzeti Bajnokság I) (12 April 2015, Sóstói Stadion), Videoton 7–0 BFC Siófok (2011–12 Nemzeti Bajnokság I) (19 November 2011)
- Heaviest defeats: Budapest Honvéd FC 5–1 Videoton (2007–08 Nemzeti Bajnokság I) (5 August 2005)

=== In Europe ===
- Biggest win: Videoton 7–1 (Slovakia) DAC Dunajska Streda (18 July 1993) (Intertoto Cup 1993)
- Heaviest defeat: (East Germany) 1. FC Magdeburg 5–0 Videoton (24 November 1976) 1976–77 UEFA Cup
