= AFC Ajax in international football =

Dutch club in the football competition

AFC Ajax in European football
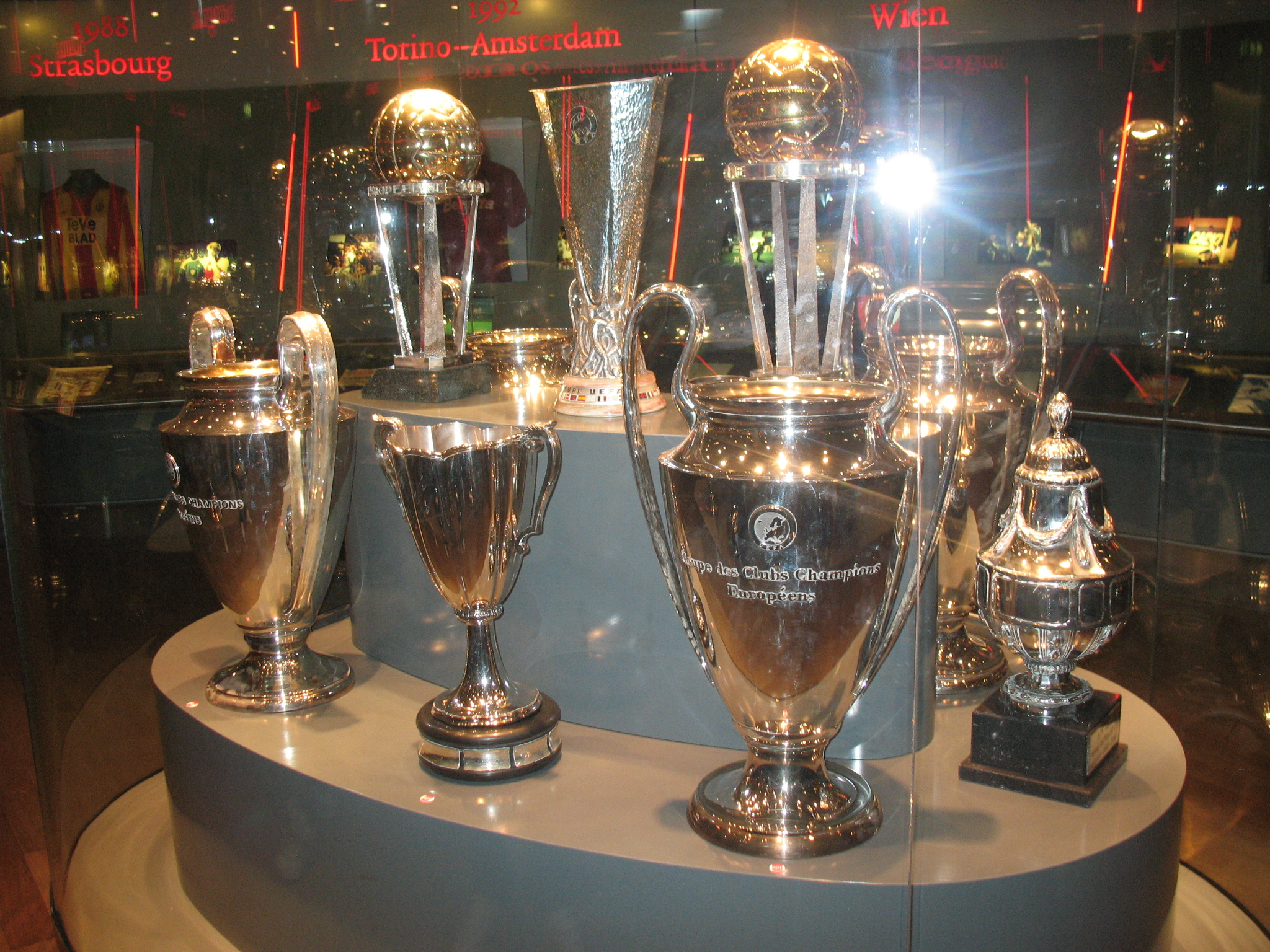
- Several of Ajax's international trophies, including the Champions League and Intercontinental Cup trophies.
- Club: AFC Ajax
- Seasons played: 63
- Top scorer: Jari Litmanen (26)
- First entry: 1957–58 European Cup
- Latest entry: 2026–27 UEFA Conference League

Titles
- Champions League: 4: 1971; 1972; 1973; 1995
- Europa League: 1: 1992
- Cup Winners' Cup: 1: 1987
- Super Cup: 2: 1974; 1995
- Intercontinental Cup: 2: 1972; 1995

AFC Ajax is one of the most successful football clubs in Europe. They have won the European Cup/Champions League four times, and are one of three clubs that have won the competition three times consecutively. Ajax have also won the UEFA Cup Winners' Cup once, the UEFA Cup once, the UEFA Super Cup three times, the Intercontinental Cup twice and the International Football Cup once. The club has also appeared in three additional finals finishing as runners-up. In the 1979–80 season, Ajax player Søren Lerby was the top scorer of the European Cup with ten goals. Below is a list of all official European matches contested by Ajax.

== History ==
=== 1950s: European debut ===
Ajax made their inaugural appearance in European competition during the 1957–58 European Cup. In the first round, they faced East German side Wismut Karl-Marx-Stadt, securing a 3–1 victory at home and a 1–0 win away, advancing with a 4–1 aggregate score. In the quarter-finals, Ajax drew 2–2 with Hungarian club Vasas SC in Amsterdam but suffered a 4–0 defeat in Budapest, resulting in a 6–2 aggregate loss and their elimination from the tournament.

=== 1960s: Building foundations ===
After their initial foray, Ajax participated in the 1960–61 European Cup but were eliminated in the preliminary round by Norwegian club Fredrikstad FK, following a 4–3 loss away and a 0–0 draw at home. The decade also saw Ajax's first major European success when they won the International Football Cup in 1962, defeating Feyenoord 4–2 in the final. In the 1968–69 European Cup, Ajax reached the final but were defeated 4–1 by AC Milan.

=== 1970s: Golden era ===
The 1970s marked a period of dominance for Ajax in European football. They secured three consecutive European Cups in 1971, 1972, and 1973, defeating Panathinaikos, Inter Milan, and Juventus in the finals, respectively. In 1972, Ajax achieved a treble by winning the Eredivisie, KNVB Cup, and European Cup. They also claimed the Intercontinental Cup in 1972 and the UEFA Super Cup in 1973.

=== 1980s: Resurgence ===
After a period of transition, Ajax returned to European prominence by winning the UEFA Cup Winners' Cup in 1987, defeating Lokomotive Leipzig 1–0 in the final. They reached the final again in 1988 but were narrowly defeated by Mechelen.

=== 1990s: Return to glory ===
The 1990s saw Ajax reclaim their status among Europe's elite. They won the UEFA Cup in 1992, becoming one of the few clubs to have won all three major European competitions. In 1995, Ajax secured their fourth Champions League title by defeating AC Milan 1–0 in the final. They reached the final again in 1996 but were defeated by Juventus in a penalty shoot-out.

=== 2000s: Challenges and rebuilding ===
The early 2000s presented challenges for Ajax in European competitions. They reached the Champions League quarter-finals in the 2002–03 season but struggled to maintain consistent performances in subsequent years. Despite these hurdles, Ajax continued to develop young talents, laying the foundation for future successes.

=== 2010s: Revival ===
Ajax experienced a resurgence in the late 2010s. They advanced to the UEFA Europa League final in 2017 but were defeated by Manchester United. In the 2018–19 Champions League, Ajax reached the semi-finals, showcasing a young and dynamic squad.

=== 2020s: Continued pursuit ===
In the 2020–21 UEFA Europa League, Ajax advanced to the quarter-finals, demonstrating their ongoing competitiveness in European tournaments. The club remains committed to its philosophy of developing young talent and playing an attacking style of football, aiming to build upon its European legacy.

== Finals ==
No.	Year	Competition	Location	Country	Opponent	Score	R
1.	1961–62	International Football Cup	Olympic Stadium, Amsterdam, Netherlands	Netherlands	Feyenoord	4–2	W
2.	1968–69	European Cup	Santiago Bernabéu, Madrid, Spain	Italy	Milan	1–4	L
3.	1970–71	European Cup	Wembley Stadium, London, England	Greece	Panathinaikos	2–0	W
4.	1971–72	European Cup	De Kuip, Rotterdam, Netherlands	Italy	Internazionale	2–0	W
5.	1972–73	European Cup	Red Star Stadium, Belgrade, Yugoslavia	Italy	Juventus	1–0	W
6.	1986–87	European Cup Winners' Cup	Olympic Stadium, Athens, Greece	East Germany	Lokomotiv Leipzig	1–0	W
7.	1987–88	European Cup Winners' Cup	Stade de la Meinau, Strasbourg, France	Belgium	Mechelen	0–1	L
8.	1991–92	UEFA Cup	1st Leg: Stadio delle Alpi, Turin, Italy; 2nd Leg: Olympic Stadium, Amsterdam, Netherlands	Italy	Torino	2–2, 0–0 (a)	W
9.	1994–95	UEFA Champions League	Ernst-Happel-Stadion, Vienna, Austria	Italy	Milan	1–0	W
10.	1995–96	UEFA Champions League	Stadio Olimpico, Rome, Italy	Italy	Juventus	1–1 (2–4 p)	L
11.	2016–17	UEFA Europa League	Friends Arena, Stockholm, Sweden	England	Manchester United	0–2	L

== European match history ==
As of 5 November 2026

=== Seasonal competitions ===
Competition	Round	Opponent	Home	Away	Aggregate
1957–58 European Cup	Round of 16	(East Germany) Wismut Karl-Marx-Stadt	1–0	3–1	4–1
1957–58 European Cup	Quarter-finals	(Hungary) Vasas	2–2	0–4	2–6
1960–61 European Cup	Preliminary round	(Norway) Fredrikstad	0–0	3–4	3–4
1961–62 Cup Winners' Cup	Preliminary round	(Hungary) Újpest	2–1	1–3	3–4
1966–67 European Cup	First round	(Turkey) Beşiktaş	2–0	2–1	4–1
1966–67 European Cup	Round of 16	(England) Liverpool	5–1	2–2	7–3
1966–67 European Cup	Quarter-finals	(Czechoslovakia) Dukla Prague	1–1	1–2	2–3
1967–68 European Cup	First round	(Spain) Real Madrid	1–1	1–2 (a.e.t.)	2–3
1968–69 European Cup	First round	(West Germany) 1. FC Nürnberg	4–0	1–1	5–1
1968–69 European Cup	Round of 16	(Turkey) Fenerbahçe	2–0	2–0	4–0
1968–69 European Cup	Quarter-finals	(Portugal) Benfica	1–3	3–1	4–4 (Note: Ajax won 3–0 in the replay played in Paris, France.) (3–0 (replay, a.e.t.))
1968–69 European Cup	Semi-finals	(Czechoslovakia) Spartak Trnava	3–0	0–2	3–2
1968–69 European Cup	Final	(Italy) Milan	1–4		
1969–70 Inter-Cities Fairs Cup	First round	(West Germany) Hannover 96	3–0	1–2	4–2
1969–70 Inter-Cities Fairs Cup	Second round	(Poland) Ruch Chorzów	7–0	2–1	9–1
1969–70 Inter-Cities Fairs Cup	Round of 16	(Italy) Napoli	4–0 (a.e.t.)	0–1	4–1
1969–70 Inter-Cities Fairs Cup	Quarter-finals	(East Germany) Carl Zeiss Jena	5–1	1–3	6–4
1969–70 Inter-Cities Fairs Cup	Semi-finals	(England) Arsenal	1–0	0–3	1–3
1970–71 European Cup	First round	(Albania) 17 Nëntori	2–0	2–2	4–2
1970–71 European Cup	Round of 16	(Switzerland) Basel	3–0	2–1	5–1
1970–71 European Cup	Quarter-finals	(Scotland) Celtic	3–0	0–1	3–1
1970–71 European Cup	Semi-finals	(Spain) Atlético Madrid	3–0	0–1	3–1
1970–71 European Cup	Final	(Greece) Panathinaikos	2–0		
1971–72 European Cup	First round	(East Germany) Dynamo Dresden	2–0	0–0	2–0
1971–72 European Cup	Round of 16	(France) Marseille	4–1	2–1	6–2
1971–72 European Cup	Quarter-finals	(England) Arsenal	2–1	1–0	3–1
1971–72 European Cup	Semi-finals	(Portugal) Benfica	1–0	0–0	1–0
1971–72 European Cup	Final	(Italy) Inter Milan	2–0		
1972–73 European Cup	Round of 16	(Bulgaria) CSKA Sofia	3–0	3–1	6–1
1972–73 European Cup	Quarter-finals	(West Germany) Bayern Munich	4–0	1–2	5–2
1972–73 European Cup	Semi-finals	(Spain) Real Madrid	2–1	1–0	2–1
1972–73 European Cup	Final	(Italy) Juventus	1–0		
1973–74 European Cup	Second round	(Bulgaria) CSKA Sofia	1–0	0–2 (a.e.t.)	1–2
1974–75 UEFA Cup	First round	(England) Stoke City	0–0	1–1	1–1 (a)
1974–75 UEFA Cup	Second round	(Belgium) Antwerp	1–0	1–2	2–2 (a)
1974–75 UEFA Cup	Round of 16	(Italy) Juventus	2–1	0–1	2–2 (a)
1975–76 UEFA Cup	First round	(Northern Ireland) Glentoran	8–0	6–1	14–1
1975–76 UEFA Cup	Second round	(West Germany) Hertha BSC	4–1	0–1	4–2
1975–76 UEFA Cup	Round of 16	(Bulgaria) Levski-Spartak	2–1	1–2 (a.e.t.)	3–3 (3–5 p)
1976–77 UEFA Cup	First round	(England) Manchester United	1–0	0–2	1–2
1977–78 European Cup	First round	(Norway) Lillestrøm	4–0	0–2	4–2
1977–78 European Cup	Round of 16	(Bulgaria) Levski-Spartak	2–1	2–1	4–1
1977–78 European Cup	Quarter-finals	(Italy) Juventus	1–1	1–1 (a.e.t.)	2–2 (0–3 p)
1978–79 UEFA Cup	First round	(Spain) Athletic Bilbao	3–0	0–2	3–2
1978–79 UEFA Cup	Second round	(Switzerland) Lausanne-Sport	1–0	4–0	5–0
1978–79 UEFA Cup	Round of 16	(Hungary) Budapest Honvéd	2–0	1–4	3–4
1979–80 European Cup	First round	(Finland) HJK	8–1	8–1	16–2
1979–80 European Cup	Round of 16	(Cyprus) Omonia	10–0	0–4	10–4
1979–80 European Cup	Quarter-finals	(France) Strasbourg	4–0	0–0	4–0
1979–80 European Cup	Semi-finals	(England) Nottingham Forest	1–0	0–2	1–2
1980–81 European Cup	First round	(Albania) Dinamo Tirana	1–0	2–0	3–0
1980–81 European Cup	Round of 16	(West Germany) Bayern Munich	2–1	1–5	3–6
1981–82 Cup Winners' Cup	First round	(England) Tottenham Hotspur	1–3	0–3	1–6
1982–83 European Cup	First round	(Scotland) Celtic	1–2	2–2	3–4
1983–84 European Cup	First round	(Greece) Olympiacos	1–1	0–2 (a.e.t.)	0–2
1984–85 UEFA Cup	First round	(Luxembourg) Red Boys Differdange	14–0	0–0	14–0
1984–85 UEFA Cup	Second round	(Czechoslovakia) Bohemians ČKD Prague	1–0	0–1 (a.e.t.)	1–1 (2–4 p)
1985–86 European Cup	First round	(Portugal) Porto	0–0	0–2	0–2
1986–87 Cup Winners' Cup	First round	(Turkey) Bursaspor	5–0	2–0	7–0
1986–87 Cup Winners' Cup	Round of 16	(Greece) Olympiacos	4–0	1–1	5–1
1986–87 Cup Winners' Cup	Quarter-finals	(Sweden) Malmö FF	3–1	0–1	3–2
1986–87 Cup Winners' Cup	Semi-finals	(Spain) Zaragoza	3–0	3–2	6–2
1986–87 Cup Winners' Cup	Final	(East Germany) Lokomotiv Leipzig	1–0		
1987–88 Cup Winners' Cup	First round	(Republic of Ireland) Dundalk	4–0	2–0	6–0
1987–88 Cup Winners' Cup	Round of 16	(West Germany) Hamburger SV	2–0	1–0	3–0
1987–88 Cup Winners' Cup	Quarter-finals	(Switzerland) Young Boys	1–0	1–0	2–0
1987–88 Cup Winners' Cup	Semi-finals	(France) Marseille	1–2	3–0	4–2
1987–88 Cup Winners' Cup	Final	(Belgium) KV Mechelen	0–1		
1988–89 UEFA Cup	First round	(Portugal) Sporting CP	1–2	2–4	3–6
1989–90 UEFA Cup	First round	Austria Wien	0–3 (Note: The match was abandoned in the 104th minute with the score at 1–1 after Austria Wien's goalkeeper Franz Wohlfahrt was struck by an iron rod thrown from the home stand. As a result, Ajax had to concede the match by default and were excluded from competing in European football for a year. Austria Wien won 4–0 on aggregate.)	0–1	0–4
1991–92 UEFA Cup	First round	(Sweden) Örebro SK	3–0	1–0	4–0
1991–92 UEFA Cup	Second round	(Germany) Rot-Weiß Erfurt	3–0	2–1	5–1
1991–92 UEFA Cup	Round of 16	(Spain) Osasuna	1–0	1–0	2–0
1991–92 UEFA Cup	Quarter-finals	(Belgium) Gent	3–0	0–0	3–0
1991–92 UEFA Cup	Semi-finals	(Italy) Genoa	1–1	3–2	4–3
1991–92 UEFA Cup	Final	(Italy) Torino	0–0	2–2	2–2 (a)
1992–93 UEFA Cup	First round	(Austria) Casino Salzburg	3–1	3–0	6–1
1992–93 UEFA Cup	Second round	(Portugal) Vitória de Guimarães	2–1	3–0	5–1
1992–93 UEFA Cup	Round of 16	(Germany) 1. FC Kaiserslautern	2–0	1–0	3–0
1992–93 UEFA Cup	Quarter-finals	(France) Auxerre	1–0	2–4	3–4
1993–94 Cup Winners' Cup	First round	(Croatia) Hajduk Split	6–0	0–1	6–1
1993–94 Cup Winners' Cup	Round of 16	(Turkey) Beşiktaş	2–1	4–0	6–1
1993–94 Cup Winners' Cup	Quarter-finals	(Italy) Parma	0–0	0–2	0–2
1994–95 Champions League	Group stage	(Italy) Milan	2–0	2–0	1st
1994–95 Champions League	Group stage	(Greece) AEK Athens	2–0	2–1	1st
1994–95 Champions League	Group stage	(Austria) Casino Salzburg	1–1	0–0	1st
1994–95 Champions League	Quarter-finals	(Croatia) Hajduk Split	3–0	0–0	3–0
1994–95 Champions League	Semi-finals	(Germany) Bayern Munich	5–2	0–0	5–2
1994–95 Champions League	Final	(Italy) Milan	1–0		
1995–96 Champions League	Group stage	(Spain) Real Madrid	1–0	2–0	1st
1995–96 Champions League	Group stage	(Hungary) Ferencváros	4–0	5–1	1st
1995–96 Champions League	Group stage	(Switzerland) Grasshopper	3–0	0–0	1st
1995–96 Champions League	Quarter-finals	(Germany) Borussia Dortmund	1–0	2–0	3–0
1995–96 Champions League	Semi-finals	(Greece) Panathinaikos	0–1	3–0	3–1
1995–96 Champions League	Final	(Italy) Juventus	1–1 (a.e.t.) (2–4 p)		
1996–97 Champions League	Group stage	(France) Auxerre	1–2	1–0	2nd
1996–97 Champions League	Group stage	(Switzerland) Grasshopper	0–1	1–0	2nd
1996–97 Champions League	Group stage	(Scotland) Rangers	4–1	1–0	2nd
1996–97 Champions League	Quarter-finals	(Spain) Atlético Madrid	1–1	3–2 (a.e.t.)	4–3
1996–97 Champions League	Semi-finals	(Italy) Juventus	1–2	1–4	2–6
1997–98 UEFA Cup	First round	(Slovenia) Maribor	9–1	1–1	10–2
1997–98 UEFA Cup	Second round	(Italy) Udinese	1–0	1–2	2–2 (a)
1997–98 UEFA Cup	Round of 16	(Germany) VfL Bochum	4–2	2–2	6–4
1997–98 UEFA Cup	Quarter-finals	(Russia) Spartak Moscow	1–3	0–1	1–4
1998–99 Champions League	Group stage	Croatia Zagreb	0–1	0–0	4th
1998–99 Champions League	Group stage	(Portugal) Porto	2–1	0–3	4th
1998–99 Champions League	Group stage	(Greece) Olympiacos	2–0	0–1	4th
1999–2000 UEFA Cup	First round	(Slovakia) Dukla Banská Bystrica	6–1	3–1	9–2
1999–2000 UEFA Cup	Second round	(Israel) Hapoel Haifa	0–1	3–0	3–1
1999–2000 UEFA Cup	Third round	(Spain) Mallorca	0–1	0–2	0–3
2000–01 UEFA Cup	First round	(Belgium) Gent	3–0	6–0	9–0
2000–01 UEFA Cup	Second round	(Switzerland) Lausanne-Sport	2–2	0–1	2–3
2001–02 Champions League	Third qualifying round	(Scotland) Celtic	1–3	1–0	3–2
2001–02 UEFA Cup	First round	(Cyprus) Apollon Limassol	2–0	3–0	5–0
2001–02 UEFA Cup	Second round	(Denmark) Copenhagen	0–1	0–0	0–1
2002–03 Champions League	Group stage 1	(France) Lyon	2–1	2–0	2nd
2002–03 Champions League	Group stage 1	(Italy) Inter Milan	1–2	0–1	2nd
2002–03 Champions League	Group stage 1	(Norway) Rosenborg	1–1	0–0	2nd
2002–03 Champions League	Group stage 2	(Spain) Valencia	1–1	1–1	2nd
2002–03 Champions League	Group stage 2	(Italy) Roma	2–1	1–1	2nd
2002–03 Champions League	Group stage 2	(England) Arsenal	0–0	1–1	2nd
2002–03 Champions League	Quarter-finals	(Italy) Milan	0–0	2–3	2–3
2003–04 Champions League	Third qualifying round	(Austria) Grazer AK	2–1 (a.e.t.)	1–1	3–2
2003–04 Champions League	Group stage	(Italy) Milan	0–1	0–1	4th
2003–04 Champions League	Group stage	(Belgium) Club Brugge	2–0	1–2	4th
2003–04 Champions League	Group stage	(Spain) Celta Vigo	1–0	2–3	4th
2004–05 Champions League	Group stage	(Germany) Bayern Munich	2–2	0–4	3rd
2004–05 Champions League	Group stage	(Italy) Juventus	0–1	0–1	3rd
2004–05 Champions League	Group stage	(Israel) Maccabi Tel Aviv	1–0	2–3	3rd
2004–05 UEFA Cup	Third round	(France) Auxerre	1–0	1–3	2–3
2005–06 Champions League	Third qualifying round	(Denmark) Brøndby	3–1	2–2	5–3
2005–06 Champions League	Group stage	(England) Arsenal	1–2	0–0	2nd
2005–06 Champions League	Group stage	(Czech Republic) Sparta Prague	2–1	1–1	2nd
2005–06 Champions League	Group stage	(Switzerland) Thun	2–0	4–2	2nd
2005–06 Champions League	Round of 16	(Italy) Inter Milan	2–2	0–1	2–3
2006–07 Champions League	Third qualifying round	(Denmark) Copenhagen	0–2	2–1	2–3
2006–07 UEFA Cup	First round	(Norway) Start	4–0	5–2	9–2
2006–07 UEFA Cup	Group stage	Austria Wien	3–0	—N/a	2nd
2006–07 UEFA Cup	Group stage	(Czech Republic) Sparta Prague	—N/a	0–0	2nd
2006–07 UEFA Cup	Group stage	(Spain) Espanyol	0–2	—N/a	2nd
2006–07 UEFA Cup	Group stage	(Belgium) Zulte Waregem	—N/a	3–0	2nd
2006–07 UEFA Cup	Third round	(Germany) Werder Bremen	3–1	1–3	3–4
2007–08 Champions League	Third qualifying round	(Czech Republic) Slavia Prague	0–1	1–2	1–3
2007–08 UEFA Cup	First round	(Croatia) Dinamo Zagreb	2–3 (a.e.t.)	1–0	3–3 (a)
2008–09 UEFA Cup	First round	(Serbia) Borac Čačak	2–0	4–1	6–1
2008–09 UEFA Cup	Group stage	(England) Aston Villa	—N/a	1–2	2nd
2008–09 UEFA Cup	Group stage	(Slovakia) MŠK Žilina	1–0	—N/a	2nd
2008–09 UEFA Cup	Group stage	(Germany) Hamburger SV	—N/a	1–0	2nd
2008–09 UEFA Cup	Group stage	(Czech Republic) Slavia Prague	2–2	—N/a	2nd
2008–09 UEFA Cup	Third round	(Italy) Fiorentina	1–1	1–0	2–1
2008–09 UEFA Cup	Round of 16	(France) Marseille	2–2 (a.e.t.)	1–2	3–4
2009–10 Europa League	Play-off round	(Slovakia) Slovan Bratislava	5–0	2–1	7–1
2009–10 Europa League	Group stage	(Romania) Timișoara	0–0	2–1	2nd
2009–10 Europa League	Group stage	(Croatia) Dinamo Zagreb	2–1	2–0	2nd
2009–10 Europa League	Group stage	(Belgium) Anderlecht	1–3	1–1	2nd
2009–10 Europa League	Round of 32	(Italy) Juventus	1–2	0–0	1–2
2010–11 Champions League	Third qualifying round	(Greece) PAOK	1–1	3–3	4–4 (a)
2010–11 Champions League	Play-off round	(Ukraine) Dynamo Kyiv	2–1	1–1	3–2
2010–11 Champions League	Group stage	(Spain) Real Madrid	0–4	0–2	3rd
2010–11 Champions League	Group stage	(Italy) Milan	1–1	2–0	3rd
2010–11 Champions League	Group stage	(France) Auxerre	2–1	1–2	3rd
2010–11 Europa League	Second round	(Belgium) Anderlecht	2–0	3–0	5–0
2010–11 Europa League	Round of 16	(Russia) Spartak Moscow	0–1	0–3	0–4
2011–12 Champions League	Group stage	(France) Lyon	0–0	0–0	3rd
2011–12 Champions League	Group stage	(Spain) Real Madrid	0–3	0–3	3rd
2011–12 Champions League	Group stage	(Croatia) Dinamo Zagreb	4–0	2–0	3rd
2011–12 Europa League	Second round	(England) Manchester United	0–2	2–1	2–3
2012–13 Champions League	Group stage	(Germany) Borussia Dortmund	1–4	0–1	3rd
2012–13 Champions League	Group stage	(Spain) Real Madrid	1–4	1–4	3rd
2012–13 Champions League	Group stage	(England) Manchester City	3–1	2–2	3rd
2012–13 Europa League	Second round	(Romania) Steaua București	2–0	0–2	2–2 (2–4 p)
2013–14 Champions League	Group stage	(Spain) Barcelona	2–1	0–4	3rd
2013–14 Champions League	Group stage	(Italy) Milan	1–1	0–0	3rd
2013–14 Champions League	Group stage	(Scotland) Celtic	1–0	1–2	3rd
2013–14 Europa League	Second round	(Austria) Red Bull Salzburg	0–3	1–3	1–6
2014–15 Champions League	Group stage	(Spain) Barcelona	0–2	1–3	3rd
2014–15 Champions League	Group stage	(France) Paris Saint-Germain	1–1	1–3	3rd
2014–15 Champions League	Group stage	(Cyprus) APOEL	4–0	1–1	3rd
2014–15 Europa League	Second round	(Poland) Legia Warsaw	1–0	3–0	4–0
2014–15 Europa League	Round of 16	(Ukraine) Dnipro Dnipropetrovsk	2–1 (a.e.t.)	0–1	2–2 (a)
2015–16 Champions League	Third qualifying round	(Austria) Rapid Wien	2–3	2–2	4–5
2015–16 Europa League	Play-off round	(Czech Republic) Baumit Jablonec	1–0	0–0	1–0
2015–16 Europa League	Group stage	(Scotland) Celtic	2–2	2–1	3rd
2015–16 Europa League	Group stage	(Turkey) Fenerbahçe	0–0	0–1	3rd
2015–16 Europa League	Group stage	(Norway) Molde	1–1	1–1	3rd
2016–17 Champions League	Third qualifying round	(Greece) PAOK	1–1	2–1	3–2
2016–17 Champions League	Play-off round	(Russia) Rostov	1–1	1–4	2–5
2016–17 Europa League	Group stage	(Greece) Panathinaikos	2–0	2–1	1st
2016–17 Europa League	Group stage	(Belgium) Standard Liège	1–0	1–1	1st
2016–17 Europa League	Group stage	(Spain) Celta Vigo	3–2	2–2	1st
2016–17 Europa League	Round of 32	(Poland) Legia Warsaw	1–0	0–0	1–0
2016–17 Europa League	Round of 16	(Denmark) Copenhagen	2–0	1–2	3–2
2016–17 Europa League	Quarter-finals	(Germany) Schalke 04	2–0	2–3 (a.e.t.)	4–3
2016–17 Europa League	Semi-finals	(France) Lyon	4–1	1–3	5–4
2016–17 Europa League	Final	(England) Manchester United	0–2		
2017–18 Champions League	Third qualifying round	(France) Nice	2–2	1–1	3–3 (a)
2017–18 Europa League	Play-off round	(Norway) Rosenborg	0–1	2–3	2–4
2018–19 Champions League	Second qualifying round	(Austria) Sturm Graz	2–0	3–1	5–1
2018–19 Champions League	Third qualifying round	(Belgium) Standard Liège	3–0	2–2	5–2
2018–19 Champions League	Play-off round	(Ukraine) Dynamo Kyiv	3–1	0–0	3–1
2018–19 Champions League	Group stage	(Germany) Bayern Munich	3–3	1–1	2nd
2018–19 Champions League	Group stage	(Portugal) Benfica	1–0	1–1	2nd
2018–19 Champions League	Group stage	(Greece) AEK Athens	3–0	2–0	2nd
2018–19 Champions League	Round of 16	(Spain) Real Madrid	1–2	4–1	5–3
2018–19 Champions League	Quarter-finals	(Italy) Juventus	1–1	2–1	3–2
2018–19 Champions League	Semi-finals	(England) Tottenham Hotspur	2–3	1–0	3–3 (a)
2019–20 Champions League	Third qualifying round	(Greece) PAOK	3–2	2–2	5–4
2019–20 Champions League	Play-off round	(Cyprus) APOEL	2–0	0–0	2–0
2019–20 Champions League	Group stage	(England) Chelsea	0–1	4–4	3rd
2019–20 Champions League	Group stage	(Spain) Valencia	0–1	3–0	3rd
2019–20 Champions League	Group stage	(France) Lille	3–0	2–0	3rd
2019–20 Europa League	Round of 32	(Spain) Getafe	2–1	0–2	2–3
2020–21 Champions League	Group stage	(England) Liverpool	0–1	0–1	3rd
2020–21 Champions League	Group stage	(Italy) Atalanta	0–1	2–2	3rd
2020–21 Champions League	Group stage	(Denmark) Midtjylland	3–1	2–1	3rd
2020–21 Europa League	Round of 32	(France) Lille	2–1	2–1	4–2
2020–21 Europa League	Round of 16	(Switzerland) Young Boys	3–0	2–0	5–0
2020–21 Europa League	Quarter-finals	(Italy) Roma	1–2	1–1	2–3
2021–22 Champions League	Group stage	(Germany) Borussia Dortmund	4–0	3–1	1st
2021–22 Champions League	Group stage	(Portugal) Sporting CP	4–2	5–1	1st
2021–22 Champions League	Group stage	(Turkey) Beşiktaş	2–0	2–1	1st
2021–22 Champions League	Round of 16	(Portugal) Benfica	0–1	2–2	2–3
2022–23 Champions League	Group stage	(England) Liverpool	0–3	1–2	3rd
2022–23 Champions League	Group stage	(Italy) Napoli	1–6	2–4	3rd
2022–23 Champions League	Group stage	(Scotland) Rangers	4–0	3–1	3rd
2022–23 Europa League	Knockout round play-offs	(Germany) 1. FC Union Berlin	0–0	1–3	1–3
2023–24 Europa League	Play-off round	(Bulgaria) Ludogorets Razgrad	0–1	4–1	4–2
2023–24 Europa League	Group stage	(France) Marseille	3–3	3–4	3rd
2023–24 Europa League	Group stage	(Greece) AEK Athens	3–1	1–1	3rd
2023–24 Europa League	Group stage	(England) Brighton & Hove Albion	0–2	0–2	3rd
2023–24 Europa Conference League	Knockout round play-offs	(Norway) Bodø/Glimt	2–2	2–1 (a.e.t.)	4–3
2023–24 Europa Conference League	Round of 16	(England) Aston Villa	0–0	0–4	0–4
2024–25 Europa League	Second qualifying round	(Serbia) Vojvodina	1–0	3–1	4–1
2024–25 Europa League	Third qualifying round	(Greece) Panathinaikos	0–1 (a.e.t.)	1–0	1–1 (13–12 p)
2024–25 Europa League	Play-off round	(Poland) Jagiellonia Białystok	3–0	4–1	7–1
2024–25 Europa League	League phase	(Turkey) Beşiktaş	4–0	—N/a	12th
2024–25 Europa League	League phase	(Czech Republic) Slavia Prague	—N/a	1–1	12th
2024–25 Europa League	League phase	(Azerbaijan) Qarabağ	—N/a	3–0	12th
2024–25 Europa League	League phase	(Israel) Maccabi Tel Aviv	5–0	—N/a	12th
2024–25 Europa League	League phase	(Spain) Real Sociedad	—N/a	0–2	12th
2024–25 Europa League	League phase	(Italy) Lazio	1–3	—N/a	12th
2024–25 Europa League	League phase	(Latvia) RFS	—N/a	0–1	12th
2024–25 Europa League	League phase	(Turkey) Galatasaray	2–1	—N/a	12th
2024–25 Europa League	Knockout phase play-offs	(Belgium) Union Saint-Gilloise	1–2 (a.e.t.)	2–0	3–2
2024–25 Europa League	Round of 16	(Germany) Eintracht Frankfurt	1–2	1–4	2–6
2025–26 Champions League	League phase	(Italy) Inter Milan	0–2	—N/a	32nd
2025–26 Champions League	League phase	(France) Marseille	—N/a	0–4	32nd
2025–26 Champions League	League phase	(England) Chelsea	—N/a	1–5	32nd
2025–26 Champions League	League phase	(Turkey) Galatasaray	0–3	—N/a	32nd
2025–26 Champions League	League phase	(Portugal) Benfica	0–2	—N/a	32nd
2025–26 Champions League	League phase	(Azerbaijan) Qarabağ	—N/a	4–2	32nd
2025–26 Champions League	League phase	(Spain) Villarreal	—N/a	2–1	32nd
2025–26 Champions League	League phase	(Greece) Olympiacos	1–2	—N/a	32nd
2026–27 Conference League	Second qualifying round	(Serbia) Vojvodina	4–1	4–1	8–2
2026–27 Conference League	Third qualifying round	(Republic of Ireland) Shelbourne	3–1	2–2	5–3
2026–27 Conference League	Play-off round	(Switzerland) Sion	5–3	4–2	9–5
2026–27 Conference League	League phase	(Croatia) Hajduk Split	—N/a	1–2	
2026–27 Conference League	League phase	(Italy) Atalanta	2–0	—N/a	
2026–27 Conference League	League phase	(Denmark) Midtjylland	—N/a	6–1	
2026–27 Conference League	League phase	(Switzerland) Thun		—N/a	
2026–27 Conference League	League phase	(Belgium) Sint-Truiden	—N/a		
2026–27 Conference League	League phase	(Spain) Getafe		—N/a	
UEFA club coefficient: 38.750 (52nd) (as per 2026–27 season)

=== UEFA Super Cup ===
Ajax have played in the UEFA Super Cup four times, winning three titles and losing only in 1987.

Year	Opponent	Home	Away	Aggregate
1972	(Scotland) Rangers	3–2	3–1	6–3
1973	(Italy) Milan	6–0	0–1	6–1
1987	(Portugal) Porto	0–1	0–1	0–2
1995	(Spain) Zaragoza	4–0	1–1	5–1

=== Intercontinental Cup ===
Ajax played for the Intercontinental Cup twice, winning both occasions. In 1971 and 1973 Ajax declined to participate in the Intercontinental Cup.

Year	Competition	Round	Country	Club	Score
1972	Intercontinental Cup	Final	Argentina	Independiente	1–1, 3–0
1995	Intercontinental Cup	Final	Brazil	Grêmio	0–0 ns (4–3)

=== Intertoto Cup ===
(Note: The tournament was founded in 1961–62, but was only taken over by UEFA in 1995. Therefore the results of Intertoto Cup before the year 1995 are excluded from the statistics.)

Competition	Round	Opponent	Home	Away	Aggregate
1961–62 Intertoto Cup	Group stage	(Sweden) Malmö FF	1–0	1–1	1st
1961–62 Intertoto Cup	Group stage	(West Germany) FK Pirmasens	9–1	2–4	1st
1961–62 Intertoto Cup	Group stage	(Switzerland) Zürich	9–1	4–1	1st
1961–62 Intertoto Cup	Quarter-finals	(Austria) First Vienna	4–3 (a.e.t.)		
1961–62 Intertoto Cup	Semi-finals	(Czechoslovakia) Slovan Bratislava	5–1		
1961–62 Intertoto Cup	Final	(Netherlands) Feyenoord	4–2		
1962–63 Intertoto Cup	Group stage	(Hungary) Banyasz Tatabánya	1–2	1–2	2nd
1962–63 Intertoto Cup	Group stage	(France) Nancy	2–1	3–2	2nd
1962–63 Intertoto Cup	Group stage	(West Germany) 1. FC Kaiserslautern	6–0	5–4	2nd
1963–64 Intertoto Cup	Group stage	(Sweden) IFK Norrköping	0–1	4–1	2nd
1963–64 Intertoto Cup	Group stage	(West Germany) Tasmania Berlin	5–1	2–2	2nd
1963–64 Intertoto Cup	Group stage	(Austria) 1. Schwechater SC	4–2	2–5	2nd
1968 Intertoto Cup	Group stage	(Italy) Torino	3–1	1–1	1st
1968 Intertoto Cup	Group stage	(Spain) Atlético Madrid	2–0	1–1	1st

== European record ==
As of 5 November 2026

Competition	Pld	W	D	L	GF	GA	GD	Win%
European Cup / UEFA Champions League	255	114	64	77	407	306	+101	44.71
UEFA Cup / UEFA Europa League	177	89	31	57	305	186	+119	50.28
UEFA Conference League	13	8	3	2	35	20	+15	61.54
UEFA Cup Winners' Cup	28	18	2	8	53	22	+31	64.29
European Super Cup / UEFA Super Cup	8	4	1	3	17	7	+10	50.00
Inter-Cities Fairs Cup	10	6	0	4	24	11	+13	60.00
Total	491	239	101	151	841	552	+289	48.68

== Results ==
Season	European Cup Champions League	Cup Winners' Cup	Inter-Cities Fairs Cup UEFA Cup Europa League	Conference League	International Football Cup Intertoto Cup
1957–58	Quarter-finals				
1960–61	3rd Qualifying Round				
1961–62		Round of 16			Winners
1962–63					Group stage
1963–64					Group stage
1966–67	Quarter-finals				
1967–68	1st Round				Group stage
1968–69	Runners-up				
1969–70			Semi-finals		
1970–71	Winners				
1971–72	Winners				
1972–73	Winners				
1973–74	Round of 16				
1974–75			Round of 16		
1975–76			Round of 16		
1976–77			1st Round		
1977–78	Quarter-finals				
1978–79			Round of 16		
1979–80	Semi-finals				
1980–81	Round of 16				
1981–82		1st Round			
1982–83	1st Round				
1983–84	1st Round				
1984–85			2nd Round		
1985–86	1st Round				
1986–87		Winners			
1987–88		Runners-up			
1988–89			1st Round		
1989–90			1st Round		
1991–92			Winners		
1992–93			Quarter-finals		
1993–94		Quarter-finals			
1994–95	Winners				
1995–96	Runners-up				
1996–97	Semi-finals				
1997–98			Quarter-finals		
1998–99	Group stage				
1999–2000			3rd Round		
2000–01			2nd Round		
2001–02	3rd Qualifying Round		2nd Round		
2002–03	Quarter-finals				
2003–04	Group stage				
2004–05	Group stage		Round of 32		
2005–06	Round of 16				
2006–07	3rd Qualifying Round		Round of 32		
2007–08	3rd Qualifying Round		1st Round		
2008–09			Round of 16		
2009–10			Round of 32		
2010–11	Group stage		Round of 16		
2011–12	Group stage		Round of 32		
2012–13	Group stage		Round of 32		
2013–14	Group stage		Round of 32		
2014–15	Group stage		Round of 16		
2015–16	3rd Qualifying Round		Group stage		
2016–17	Play-off Qualifying Round		Runners-up		
2017–18	3rd Qualifying Round		Play-off Qualifying Round		
2018–19	Semi-finals				
2019–20	Group stage		Round of 32		
2020–21	Group stage		Quarter-finals		
2021–22	Round of 16				
2022–23	Group stage		Knockout Round Play-offs		
2023–24			Group stage	Round of 16	
2024–25			Round of 16		
2025–26	League phase				

=== Appearances ===
Name	Competition	Apps	Season(s)	Runners-up	Winners
Cup for European champions	Champions League	25	1994–95, 1995–96, 1996–97, 1998–99, 2001–02*, 2002–03, 2003–04, 2004–05, 2005–06, 2006–07*, 2007–08*, 2010–11, 2011–12, 2012–13, 2013–14, 2014–15, 2015–16*, 2016–17*, 2017–18*, 2018–19, 2019–20, 2020–21, 2021–22, 2022–23, 2025–26	1996	1995
Cup for European champions	European Cup	15	1957–58, 1960–61*, 1966–67, 1967–68, 1968–69, 1970–71, 1971–72, 1972–73, 1973–74, 1977–78, 1979–80, 1980–81, 1982–83, 1983–84, 1985–86	1969	1971; 1972; 1973
Cup; Winners' Cup	Cup Winners' Cup	5	1961–62, 1981–82, 1986–87, 1987–88, 1993–94	1988	1987
Europa League	Europa League	14	2009–10, 2010–11, 2011–12, 2012–13, 2013–14, 2014–15, 2015–16, 2016–17, 2017–18*, 2019–20, 2020–21, 2022–23, 2023–24, 2024–25	2017	x
Europa League	UEFA Cup	17	1974–75, 1975–76, 1976–77, 1978–79, 1984–85, 1988–89, 1989–90, 1991–92, 1992–93, 1997–98, 1999–2000, 2000–01, 2001–02, 2004–05, 2006–07, 2007–08, 2008–09	x	1992
Europa League	Inter-Cities Fairs Cup	1	1969–70	x	x
Conference League	Conference League	2	2023–24, 2026–27	x	x
Friendly; Europa Cup	Intertoto Cup	1x	1968	x	x
Friendly; Europa Cup	International Football Cup	3	1961–62, 1962–63, 1963–64	x	1962

- (*) = Only played qualifying rounds and did not participate in the main tournament

== Record by club ==
(Note: The Intertoto Cup was first founded in 1961–62, but was only taken over by UEFA in 1995. Ajax results from the Intertoto Cup before the year 1995 are thus excluded from this table.)

As of 5 November 2026

Club	Country	Pld	W	D	L	GF	GA	Season(s)
17 Nëntori Tirana	Albania	2	1	1	0	4	2	1970–71
Dinamo Tirana	Albania	2	2	0	0	3	0	1980–81
Austria Wien	Austria	3	1	0	2	3	4	1989–90, 2006–07
Grazer AK	Austria	2	1	1	0	3	2	2003–04
Rapid Wien	Austria	2	0	1	1	4	5	2015–16
Red Bull Salzburg (Note: The team was known as SV Casino Salzburg between 1978 and 1997. It has been known as FC Red Bull Salzburg since 2005.)	Austria	6	2	2	2	8	8	1992–93, 1994–95, 2013–14
Sturm Graz	Austria	2	2	0	0	5	1	2018–19
Qarabağ	Azerbaijan	2	2	0	0	7	2	2024–25, 2025–26
Anderlecht	Belgium	4	2	1	1	7	4	2009–10, 2010–11
Antwerp	Belgium	2	1	0	1	2	2	1974–75
Club Brugge	Belgium	2	1	0	1	3	2	2003–04
Gent	Belgium	4	3	1	0	12	0	1991–92, 2000–01
Mechelen	Belgium	1	0	0	1	0	1	1987–88
Standard Liège	Belgium	4	2	2	0	7	2	2016–17, 2018–19
Union Saint-Gilloise	Belgium	2	1	0	1	3	2	2024–25
Zulte Waregem	Belgium	1	1	0	0	3	0	2006–07
CSKA Sofia (Note: The team was known as CSKA September Flag between 1968 and 1985. It has been known as PFC CSKA Sofia since 2016.)	Bulgaria	4	3	0	1	7	3	1972–73, 1973–74
Levski Sofia (Note: The team was known as Levski-Spartak between 1969 and 1985. It has been known as Levski Sofia since 1990.)	Bulgaria	4	3	0	1	9	5	1975–76, 1977–78
Ludogorets Razgrad	Bulgaria	2	1	0	1	4	2	2023–24
Dinamo Zagreb (Note: The team was known as Croatia Zagreb between 1993 and 2000. The team changed back to its original name Dinamo Zagreb in 2000.) (Note: The team was part of the former Yugoslavia before 1992.)	Croatia	8	5	1	2	13	5	1998–99, 2007–08, 2009–10, 2011–12
Hajduk Split	Croatia	5	2	1	2	10	3	1993–94, 1994–95, 2026–27
APOEL	Cyprus	4	2	2	2	7	1	2014–15, 2019–20
Apollon Limassol	Cyprus	2	2	0	0	5	0	2001–02
Omonia	Cyprus	2	1	0	1	10	4	1979–80
Bohemians Prague (Note: The team was known as Bohemians ČKD Praha between 1965 and 1993. It has been known as Bohemians Praha 1905 since 2013.)	Czech Republic	2	1	0	1	1	1	1984–85
Dukla Prague	Czech Republic	2	0	1	1	2	3	1966–67
Jablonec (Note: The team was known as Baumit Jablonec between 2008 and 2015.)	Czech Republic	2	1	1	0	1	0	2015–16
Slavia Prague	Czech Republic	4	0	2	2	4	6	2007–08, 2008–09, 2024–25
Sparta Prague	Czech Republic	3	1	2	0	3	2	2005–06, 2006–07
Brøndby	Denmark	2	1	1	0	5	3	2005–06
Copenhagen	Denmark	6	2	1	3	5	6	2001–02, 2006–07, 2016–17
Midtjylland	Denmark	3	3	0	0	11	3	2020–21, 2026–27
Arsenal	England	8	3	3	2	6	7	1969–70, 1971–72, 2002–03, 2005–06
Aston Villa	England	3	0	1	2	1	6	2008–09, 2023–24
Brighton & Hove Albion	England	2	0	0	2	0	4	2023–24
Chelsea	England	3	0	1	2	5	10	2019–20, 2025–26
Liverpool	England	6	1	1	4	8	10	1966–67, 2020–21, 2022–23
Manchester City	England	2	1	1	0	5	3	2012–13
Manchester United	England	5	2	0	3	3	7	1976–77, 2011–12, 2016–17
Nottingham Forest	England	2	1	0	1	1	2	1979–80
Stoke City	England	2	0	2	0	1	1	1974–75
Tottenham Hotspur	England	4	1	0	3	4	9	1981-82, 2018–19
HJK	Finland	2	2	0	0	16	2	1979–80
Auxerre	France	8	4	0	4	10	12	1992–93, 1996–97, 2004–05, 2010–11
Lille	France	4	4	0	0	11	2	2019–20, 2020–21
Lyon	France	6	3	2	1	9	5	2002–03, 2011–12, 2016–17
Marseille	France	9	3	2	4	19	19	1971–72, 1987–88, 2008–09, 2023–24, 2025–26
Nice	France	2	0	2	0	3	3	2017–18
Paris Saint-Germain	France	2	0	1	1	2	4	2014–15
Strasbourg	France	2	1	1	0	4	0	1979–80
1. FC Kaiserslautern	Germany	2	2	0	0	3	0	1992–93
1. FC Nürnberg	Germany	2	1	1	0	5	1	1968–69
1. FC Union Berlin	Germany	2	0	1	1	1	3	2022–23
Bayern Munich	Germany	10	3	4	3	19	20	1972–73, 1980–81, 1994–95, 2004–05, 2018–19
Borussia Dortmund	Germany	6	4	0	2	11	6	1995–96, 2012–13, 2021–22
Carl Zeiss Jena	Germany	2	1	0	1	6	4	1969–70
Dynamo Dresden	Germany	2	1	1	0	2	0	1971–72
Eintracht Frankfurt	Germany	2	0	0	2	2	6	2024–25
Erzgebirge Aue (Note: The team was known as SC Wismut Karl-Marx-Stadt between 1954 and 1991. It has been known as FC Erzgebirge Aue since 1991.)	Germany	2	2	0	0	4	1	1957–58
Hamburger SV	Germany	3	3	0	0	4	0	1987–88, 2008–09
Hannover 96	Germany	2	1	0	1	4	2	1969–70
Hertha BSC	Germany	2	1	0	1	4	2	1975–76
Lokomotive Leipzig	Germany	1	1	0	0	1	0	1986–87
Rot-Weiß Erfurt	Germany	2	2	0	0	5	1	1991–92
Schalke 04	Germany	2	1	0	1	4	3	2016–17
VfL Bochum	Germany	2	1	1	0	6	4	1997–98
Werder Bremen	Germany	2	1	0	1	3	4	2006–07
AEK Athens	Greece	6	5	1	0	12	3	1994–95, 2018–19, 2023–24
Olympiacos	Greece	7	2	2	3	8	6	1983–84, 1986–87, 1998–99, 2025–26
Panathinaikos	Greece	7	5	0	2	10	3	1970–71, 1995–96, 2016–17, 2024–25
PAOK	Greece	6	2	4	0	12	10	2010–11, 2016–17, 2019–20
Budapest Honvéd	Hungary	2	1	0	1	3	4	1978–79
Ferencváros	Hungary	2	2	0	0	9	1	1995–96
Újpest	Hungary	2	1	0	1	3	4	1961–62
Vasas	Hungary	2	0	1	1	2	6	1957–58
Dundalk	Ireland	2	2	0	0	6	0	1987–88
Shelbourne	Ireland	2	1	1	0	5	3	2026–27
Hapoel Haifa	Israel	2	1	0	1	3	1	1999–2000
Maccabi Tel Aviv	Israel	3	2	0	1	9	2	2004–05, 2024–25
Atalanta	Italy	3	1	1	1	4	3	2020–21, 2026–27
Fiorentina	Italy	2	1	1	0	2	1	2008–09
Genoa	Italy	2	1	1	0	4	3	1991–92
Inter Milan	Italy	6	1	1	4	5	8	1971–72, 2002–03, 2005–06, 2025–26
Juventus	Italy	14	3	5	6	12	17	1972–73, 1974–75, 1977–78, 1995–96, 1996–97, 2004–05, 2009–10, 2018–19
Lazio	Italy	1	0	0	1	1	3	2024–25
Milan	Italy	14	5	4	5	18	12	1968–69, 1973, 1994–95, 2002–03, 2003–04, 2010–11, 2013–14
Napoli	Italy	4	1	0	3	7	11	1969–70, 2022–23
Parma	Italy	2	0	1	1	0	2	1993–94
Roma	Italy	4	1	2	1	5	6	2002–03, 2020–21
Torino	Italy	2	0	2	0	2	2	1991–92
Udinese	Italy	2	1	0	1	2	2	1997–98
RFS	Latvia	1	0	0	1	0	1	2024–25
Red Boys Differdange	Luxembourg	2	1	1	0	14	0	1984–85
Glentoran (Note: The team has been playing in the Northern Ireland Football League since the 2013–14 season; they played in the Irish Premier League before this.)	Northern Ireland	2	2	0	0	14	1	1975–76
Bodø/Glimt	Norway	2	1	1	0	4	3	2023–24
Fredrikstad	Norway	2	0	1	1	3	4	1960–61
Lillestrøm	Norway	2	1	0	1	4	2	1977–78
Molde	Norway	2	0	2	0	2	2	2015–16
Rosenborg	Norway	4	0	2	2	3	5	2002–03, 2017–18
Start	Norway	2	2	0	0	9	2	2006–07
Jagiellonia Białystok	Poland	2	2	0	0	7	1	2024–25
Legia Warsaw	Poland	4	3	1	0	5	0	2014–15, 2016–17
Ruch Chorzów	Poland	2	2	0	0	9	1	1969–70
Benfica	Portugal	10	4	3	3	12	10	1968–69, 1971–72, 2018–19, 2021–22, 2025–26
Porto	Portugal	6	1	1	4	2	8	1985–86, 1987, 1998–99
Sporting CP	Portugal	4	2	0	2	12	9	1988–89, 2021–22
Vitória de Guimarães	Portugal	2	2	0	0	5	1	1992–93
Steaua București	Romania	2	1	0	1	2	2	2012–13
Timișoara	Romania	2	1	1	0	2	1	2009–10
Rostov	Russia	2	0	1	1	2	5	2016–17
Spartak Moscow	Russia	4	0	0	4	1	8	1997–98, 2010–11
Celtic	Scotland	10	4	2	4	14	13	1970–71, 1982–83, 2001–02, 2013–14, 2015–16
Rangers	Scotland	6	6	0	0	18	5	1972, 1996–97, 2022–23
Borac Čačak	Serbia	2	2	0	0	6	1	2008–09
Vojvodina	Serbia	4	4	0	0	12	3	2024–25, 2026–27
Dukla Banská Bystrica	Slovakia	2	2	0	0	9	2	1999–2000
MŠK Žilina	Slovakia	1	1	0	0	1	0	2008–09
Slovan Bratislava (Note: The team was known as TJ Slovan CHZJD Bratislava between 1961 and 1990. It has been known as ŠK Slovan Bratislava since 1990.)	Slovakia	2	2	0	0	7	1	2009–10
Spartak Trnava (Note: The team was known as Spartak TAZ Trnava between 1967 and 1988. It has been known as FC Spartak Trnava since 1993.)	Slovakia	2	1	0	1	3	2	1968–69
Maribor	Slovenia	2	1	1	0	10	2	1997–98
Atlético Madrid	Spain	4	2	1	1	7	4	1970–71, 1996–97
Athletic Bilbao	Spain	2	1	0	1	3	2	1978–79
Barcelona	Spain	4	1	0	3	3	10	2013–14, 2014–15
Celta Vigo	Spain	4	2	1	1	8	7	2003–04, 2016–17
Espanyol	Spain	1	0	0	1	0	2	2006–07
Getafe	Spain	2	1	0	1	2	3	2019–20
Mallorca	Spain	2	0	0	2	0	3	1999–2000
Osasuna	Spain	2	2	0	0	2	0	1991–92
Real Madrid	Spain	14	5	1	8	17	30	1967–68, 1972–73, 1995–96, 2010–11, 2011–12, 2012–13, 2018–19
Real Sociedad	Spain	1	0	0	1	0	2	2024–25
Valencia	Spain	4	1	2	1	5	3	2002–03, 2019–20
Villarreal	Spain	1	1	0	0	2	1	2025–26
Zaragoza	Spain	4	3	1	0	11	3	1986–87, 1995
Malmö FF	Sweden	2	1	0	1	3	2	1986–87
Örebro SK	Sweden	2	2	0	0	4	0	1991–92
Basel	Switzerland	2	2	0	0	5	1	1970–71
Grasshopper	Switzerland	4	2	1	1	4	1	1995–96, 1996–97
Lausanne-Sport	Switzerland	4	2	1	1	7	3	1978–79, 2000–01
Sion	Switzerland	2	2	0	0	9	5	2026–27
Thun	Switzerland	2	2	0	0	6	2	2005–06
Young Boys	Switzerland	4	2	0	0	5	1	1987–88, 2020–21
Beşiktaş	Turkey	7	7	0	0	18	3	1966–67, 1993–94, 2021–22, 2024–25
Bursaspor	Turkey	2	2	0	0	7	0	1986–87
Fenerbahçe	Turkey	4	2	1	1	4	1	1968–69, 2015–16
Galatasaray	Turkey	2	1	0	1	2	4	2024–25, 2025–26
Dnipro	Ukraine	2	1	0	1	2	2	2014–15
Dynamo Kyiv	Ukraine	4	2	2	0	6	3	2010–11, 2018–19

=== Most frequent opponents ===
As of 25 November 2025

Rank	Club	Pld	W	D	L	GF	GA	Last match
1	(Italy) Milan	14	5	4	5	18	12	2013–14 UEFA Champions League
1	(Italy) Juventus	14	3	5	6	12	17	2018–19 UEFA Champions League
1	(Spain) Real Madrid	14	5	1	8	17	30	2018–19 UEFA Champions League
4	(Germany) Bayern Munich	10	3	4	3	19	20	2018–19 UEFA Champions League
4	(Portugal) Benfica	10	4	3	3	12	10	2025–26 UEFA Champions League
4	(Scotland) Celtic	10	4	2	4	14	13	2015–16 UEFA Europa League
7	(France) Marseille	9	3	2	4	19	19	2025–26 UEFA Champions League
8	(England) Arsenal	8	3	3	2	6	7	2005–06 UEFA Champions League
8	(France) Auxerre	8	4	0	4	10	12	2010–11 UEFA Champions League
8	(Croatia) Dinamo Zagreb	8	5	1	2	16	11	2021–22 UEFA Champions League

== Top goalscorers ==
As of 5 November 2026

Rank	Goals	Player	Date of last goal	Competition
1	26	(Finland) Jari Litmanen	23 April 2003	2002–03 UEFA Champions League
2	25	(Netherlands) Johan Cruyff	7 March 1973	1972–73 European Cup
3	22	(Netherlands) Davy Klaassen	5 November 2026	2026–27 UEFA Conference League
4	19	(Serbia) Dušan Tadić	23 February 2022	2021–22 UEFA Champions League
5	17	(Netherlands) Klaas-Jan Huntelaar	6 August 2019	2019–20 UEFA Champions League
5	17	(Netherlands) Sjaak Swart	8 November 1972	1972–73 European Cup
7	16	(Uruguay) Luis Suárez	25 August 2010	2010–11 UEFA Champions League
7	16	(Denmark) Søren Lerby	15 September 1982	1982–83 European Cup
9	14	(Netherlands) Piet Keizer	21 March 1973	1973–74 European Cup
9	14	(Netherlands) Ruud Geels	28 September 1977	1977–78 European Cup
11	12	(Netherlands) Gerrie Mühren	1 October 1975	1975–76 UEFA Cup
11	12	(Netherlands) John Bosman	9 March 1988	1987–88 European Cup Winners' Cup
11	12	(Sweden) Stefan Pettersson	3 November 1993	1993–94 European Cup Winners' Cup
14	11	(Netherlands) Marco van Basten	13 May 1987	1986–87 European Cup Winners' Cup
14	11	(Ivory Coast) Sébastien Haller	7 December 2021	2021–22 UEFA Champions League
16	10	(Netherlands) Dennis Bergkamp	4 November 1992	1992–93 UEFA Cup
16	10	(Morocco) Hakim Ziyech	27 November 2019	2019–20 UEFA Champions League
16	10	(Denmark) Lasse Schöne	13 February 2019	2018–19 UEFA Champions League
16	10	(Georgia (country)) Shota Arveladze	9 November 2000	2000–01 UEFA Cup
16	10	(Netherlands) Steven Berghuis	23 July 2026	2026–27 UEFA Conference League
16	10	(Denmark) Kasper Dolberg	6 August 2026	2026–27 UEFA Conference League
22	9	(Netherlands) Brian Brobbey	7 March 2025	2024–25 UEFA Europa League
22	9	(Netherlands) Donny van de Beek	5 November 2019	2019–20 UEFA Champions League
22	9	(Netherlands) Kenneth Taylor	13 March 2025	2024–25 UEFA Europa League
22	9	(Netherlands) Patrick Kluivert	5 March 1997	1996–97 UEFA Champions League
22	9	(Sweden) Zlatan Ibrahimović	22 October 2003	2003–04 UEFA Champions League

== Honours ==
AFC Ajax honours in European competition
Honour	No.	Years
European Cup/UEFA Champions League	4	1970–71, 1971–72, 1972–73, 1994–95
UEFA Super Cup	3*	1972*, 1973, 1995
Intercontinental Cup	2	1972, 1995
UEFA Cup	1	1991–92
UEFA Cup Winners' Cup	1	1986–87
International Football Cup	1	1961-62
