= Valery Plotnikov =

Valery Plotnikov may refer to:

- Valery Plotnikov (boxer) (born 1940), Russian boxer
- Valery Plotnikov (footballer) (born 1962), Russian footballer
