= Franz Wöhrer =

Austrian football referee

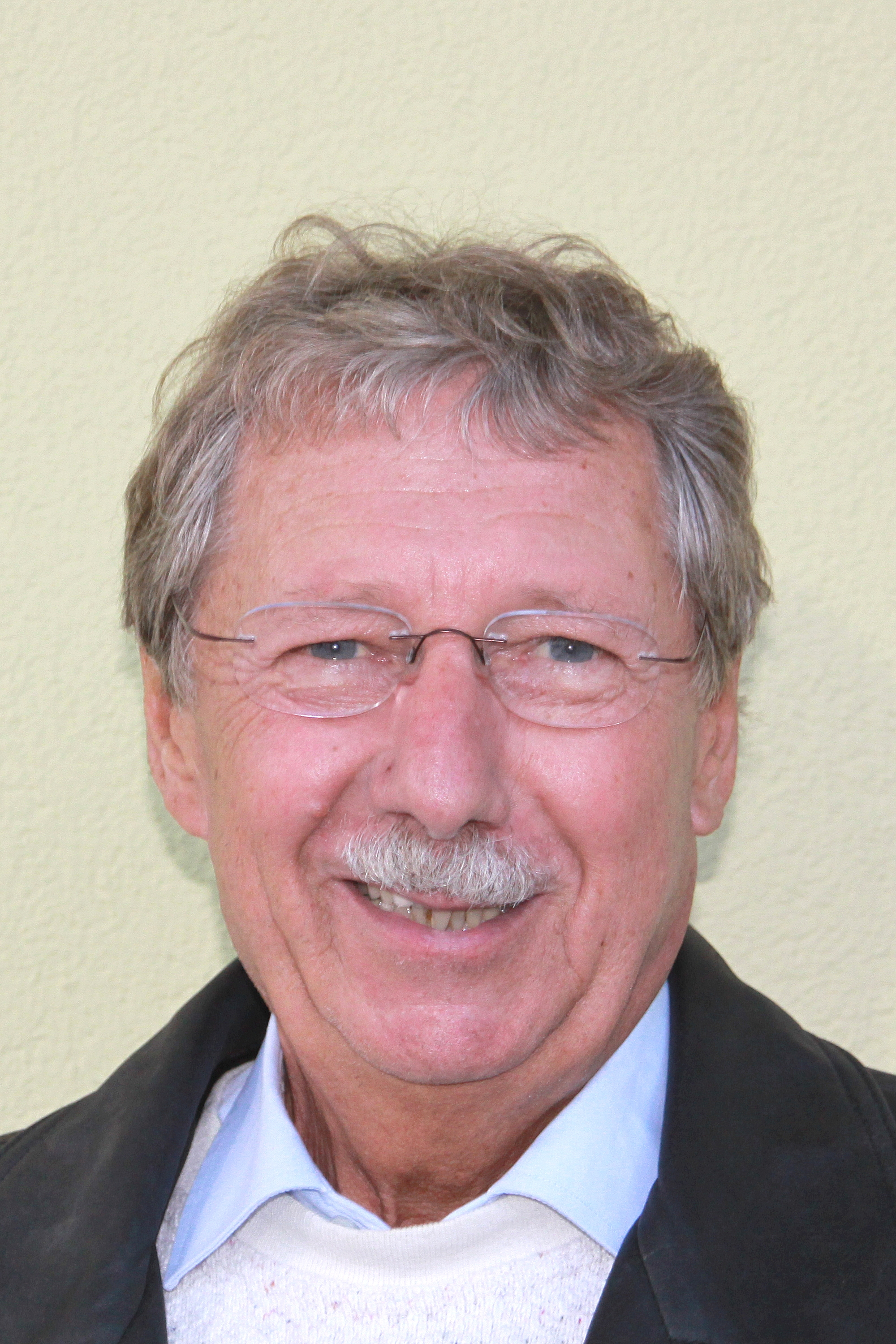
Franz Wöhrer

Franz Wöhrer (born 5 June 1939) is a former football referee from Austria. He is best known for supervising one match in the 1982 FIFA World Cup in Spain, between Cameroon and Peru. On 22 April 1981 he supervised a UEFA Cup Winners' Cup semifinal match between Feyenoord Rotterdam and Dinamo Tbilisi. He was also the centre referee in Valencia on 17 December 1980, when Valencia beat Nottingham Forest 1–0 and won the cup with an aggregate score of 2–2, having lost the first leg in Nottingham 2–1. Wöhrer retired in 1987.

Preceded by UEFA Cup Winners' Cup Final 1985 (Italy) Paolo Casarin	UEFA Cup Winners' Cup Final Referees; Final 1986 (Austria) Franz Wöhrer	Succeeded by UEFA Cup Winners' Cup Final 1987 (Italy) Luigi Agnolin
