= 1973 European Cup final =

- Match programme cover
- Event: 1972–73 European Cup
Ajax	Juventus
(Netherlands)	(Italy)
1	0
- Date: 30 May 1973
- Venue: Red Star Stadium, Belgrade
- Referee: Milivoje Gugulović (Yugoslavia)
- Attendance: 89,484

The 1973 European Cup final was a football match held at the Red Star Stadium in Belgrade, Yugoslavia on 30 May 1973. Two-time defending champions Ajax of the Netherlands faced Juventus of Italy.

Johnny Rep scored the only goal of the game after five minutes as Ajax won 1–0 to claim their third consecutive European Cup and earned the Dutch side the privilege of keeping the trophy permanently.

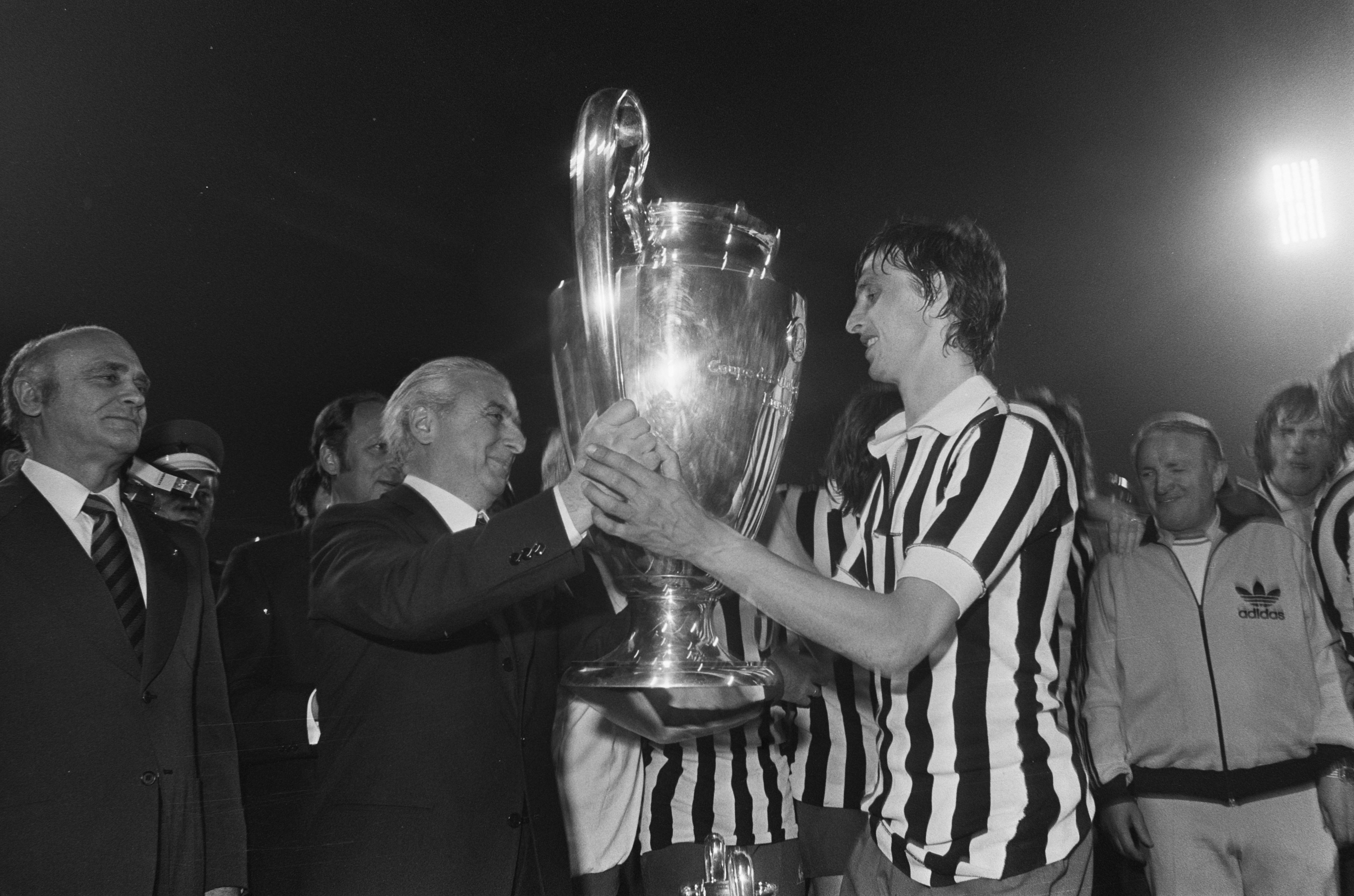
Ajax captain Johan Cruyff receives the trophy wearing a Juventus shirt, having exchanged jerseys with the losing finalists

== Background ==
Ajax had reached the European Cup final on three previous occasions. They were two-time defending champions coming into the 1972–73 season after defeating Panathinaikos 2–0 in 1971 and Inter Milan by the same scoreline in 1972.

Juventus had never previously reached a European Cup final.

== Route to the final ==
=== Ajax ===
As defending champions, Ajax qualified automatically for the 1972–73 European Cup. They received a bye in the first round. In the second round, they defeated CSKA Sofia of Bulgaria 3–1 away and 3–0 at home to advance 6–1 on aggregate. They then defeated Bayern Munich of West Germany 4–0 in the first leg of their quarter-final in Amsterdam. Despite a 2–1 defeat in the second leg, Ajax advanced 5–2 on aggregate. In the semi-finals, they faced Real Madrid of Spain. A 2–1 first leg win was followed up with a 1–0 win in Madrid as they reached the final 3–1 on aggregate.

=== Juventus ===
Juventus qualified for the 1972–73 European Cup as champions of the 1971–72 Serie A. In the first round, they faced Olympique de Marseille of France. The first leg, which was played in Lyon, ended in a 1–0 win for Olympique de Marseille. However, Juventus won the second leg 3–0 to advance 3–1 on aggregate. In the second round, they defeated Magdeburg of East Germany 1–0 in both legs to advance 2–0 on aggregate. After a goalless draw in the first leg of their quarter-final against Újpesti Dózsa of Hungary in Turin, the second leg ended 2–2 in Budapest (2–2 on aggregate) and Juventus advanced on away goals. In the semi-finals, they defeated Derby County of England 3–1 in the first leg before a goalless second leg which meant Juventus progressed 3–1 on aggregate.

Ajax				Round	Juventus			
Opponent	Agg.	1st leg	2nd leg		Opponent	Agg.	1st leg	2nd leg
Bye				First round	(France) Olympique de Marseille	3–1	0–1 (A)	3–0 (H)
(Bulgaria) CSKA Sofia	6–1	3–1 (A)	3–0 (H)	Second round	(East Germany) 1. FC Magdeburg	2–0	1–0 (H)	1–0 (A)
(West Germany) Bayern München	5–2	4–0 (H)	1–2 (A)	Quarter-finals	(Hungary) Újpesti Dózsa	2–2 (a)	0–0 (H)	2–2 (A)
(Spain) Real Madrid	3–1	2–1 (H)	1–0 (A)	Semi-finals	(England) Derby County	3–1	3–1 (H)	0–0 (A)

== Match ==
=== Details ===
30 May 1973
20:30

Ajax (Netherlands)	1–0	(Italy) Juventus
Rep 5'	Report

Red Star Stadium, Belgrade
Attendance: 89,484
Referee: Milivoje Gugulović (Yugoslavia)

Ajax	Juventus

GK	1	(Netherlands) Heinz Stuy
RB	3	(Netherlands) Wim Suurbier
CB	13	(Netherlands) Barry Hulshoff
CB	12	(West Germany) Horst Blankenburg
LB	5	(Netherlands) Ruud Krol
CM	7	(Netherlands) Johan Neeskens
CM	15	(Netherlands) Arie Haan
CM	9	(Netherlands) Gerrie Mühren
RW	16	(Netherlands) Johnny Rep
CF	14	(Netherlands) Johan Cruyff (c)
LW	11	(Netherlands) Piet Keizer
Substitutes (not used):
MF	4	(Netherlands) Gerrie Kleton
MF	6	(Netherlands) Arnold Mühren
MF	8	(Netherlands) Sjaak Swart
FW	10	(Netherlands) Jan Mulder
GK	13	(Netherlands) Sies Wever
Manager:
(Romania) Ștefan Kovács

GK	1	(Italy) Dino Zoff
SW	6	(Italy) Sandro Salvadore (c)
RB	2	(Italy) Gianpietro Marchetti
CB	5	(Italy) Francesco Morini
LB	3	(Italy) Silvio Longobucco
CM	8	(Italy) Franco Causio		(substituted off) 57'
CM	10	(Italy) Fabio Capello
CM	4	(Italy) Giuseppe Furino	(yellow card) 66'
RF	7	(Brazil) (Note: A Brazilian expatriate, Altafini had represented his native Brazil at the 1958 FIFA World Cup, but in 1961 he changed allegiances to Italy. He notably played for Italy at the 1962 World Cup.) José Altafini
CF	9	(Italy) Pietro Anastasi
LF	11	(Italy) Roberto Bettega		(substituted off) 49'
Substitutes:
MF	14	(Italy) Antonello Cuccureddu		(substituted on) 57'
MF	15	(West Germany) Helmut Haller		(substituted on) 49'
Manager:
(Czechoslovakia) Čestmír Vycpálek

Assistant referees:
Ratko Čanak (Yugoslavia)
Petar Kostovski (Yugoslavia)

Match rules

- 90 minutes
- 30 minutes of extra time if necessary
- Replay if scores still level
- Maximum of two substitutions

== Aftermath ==
Juventus would gain revenge for the defeat 23 years later when the two sides contested the final of the same competition (rebranded as the UEFA Champions League). After a 1–1 draw after extra time, Juventus won 4–2 on penalties. Although in later years the victory by Juventus in that final would be tarnished by allegations of the taking of performance enhancing drugs by the Juventus players.

== See also ==
- 1972–73 Juventus FC season
- 1973 European Cup Winners' Cup final
- 1973 European Super Cup
- 1973 UEFA Cup final
- 1996 UEFA Champions League final – contested by the same teams
- AFC Ajax in international football
- Juventus FC in international football
