= Róbert Jován =

Hungarian footballer (born 1967)

Personal information
- Date of birth: 2 November 1967 (age 58)
- Place of birth: Hatvan
- Height: 1.85 m (6 ft 1 in)
- Position: Forward

Senior career*
Years	Team	Apps	(Gls)
1986–1993	MTK Budapest		
1988–1989	→ Videoton		
1992	→ BSV Stahl Brandenburg		
1994	Fehérvár FC		
1994–1996	Vasas SC		
1997–1999	R. Charleroi S.C.		
1999	FinnPa		

International career
1990–1995	Hungary	5	(1)
- * Club domestic league appearances and goals

Róbert Jován (born 2 November 1967) is a retired Hungarian football striker.
