= Valery Plotnikov (footballer) =

Russian footballer

Personal information
- Full name: Valery Viktorovich Plotnikov
- Date of birth: 12 June 1962 (age 64)
- Place of birth: Kashira, Russian SFSR
- Height: 1.82 m (5 ft 11 1/2 in)
- Position: Midfielder

Senior career*
Years	Team	Apps	(Gls)
1980–1982	FC Iskra Smolensk	56	(4)
1983	PFC CSKA Moscow	25	(2)
1984	FC Dynamo Kashira	29	(4)
1985	FC Sokol Saratov	28	(9)
1986–1987	FC Torpedo Moscow	20	(1)
1988	FC Rotor Volgograd	11	(0)
1989	FC Sokol Saratov	42	(13)
1990	FC Dnepr Dnepropetrovsk	1	(0)
1990–1991	FC Lokomotiv Moscow	37	(0)
1992–1993	SpVgg Ludwigsburg	34	(1)
- * Club domestic league appearances and goals

Valery Viktorovich Plotnikov (Russian: Валерий Викторович Плотников; born 12 June 1962) is a retired Russian professional footballer.

== Honours ==
- Soviet Cup finalist: 1990.

== European club competitions ==
- European Cup Winners' Cup 1986–87 with FC Torpedo Moscow: 4 games, 1 goal.
- European Cup 1989–90 with FC Dnipro Dnipropetrovsk: 1 game.
