= Roberto Elvira =

Spanish football player/manager

Personal information
- Full name: Roberto Elvira Estrany
- Date of birth: 9 May 1963 (age 63)
- Place of birth: Barcelona, Spain
- Height: 1.79 m (5 ft 10 in)
- Position: Forward

Senior career*
Years	Team	Apps	(Gls)
1981–1983	Sabadell	71	(19)
1983–1984	Alcalá	31	(4)
1984–1986	Zaragoza B	71	(33)
1986–1988	Zaragoza	34	(3)
1988–1990	CA Osasuna	22	(3)
1990–1992	Sabadell	64	(13)
1992–1993	Palamós CF	11	(1)
1993–1994	Andorra	33	(4)
1994–1995	Hospitalet	30	(3)
1995–1997	Sabadell	67	(6)

Managerial career
- 1997–1999: Terrassa (assistant)
- 1999–2002: Gimnàstic (assistant)
- 2002–2004: Sabadell
- 2004–2005: Hospitalet
- 2008–2009: Catalonia amateur
- 2009–2010: CF Vilanova
- * Club domestic league appearances and goals

Roberto Elvira (born 9 May 1963) is a Spanish retired footballer who played as a forward and manager.

== Playing career ==
Roberto Elvira started his professional career in 1981 with Sabadell and he played in different clubs as a striker in the first and second division leagues in Spain. He made his first team debut with Sabadell at the age of 18, in the Spanish Segunda División, coached by Manuel Polinario Muñoz. Regularly engaged, he scored 10 goals in the league in the last 12 days. In the following season he is still the holder in attack, together with Antonio Zambrano Díaz and Hans Schönhöfer. He scored 9 goals in 38 games, but his contribution is not enough to avoid relegation to Segunda B.

Thus Roberto passes to Real Zaragoza. In his first season in blue-white he is mainly engaged with Deportivo Aragón, the Zaragoza branch team that is playing his first and only season in Segunda División. He is the best scorer of the team with 16 goals, but once again the season ends with relegation to Segunda B. In parallel, he is also engaged in the first team: although not making his debut in the league, he plays 6 games in the La Liga Cup(in which the Aragonese are eliminated in the semifinal) and 4 in the Spanish Cup, a competition that is won by Real Zaragoza. In the next two seasons, he is definitely part of the first team. On 31 August 1986 he made his Primera División debut against Sevilla. In the 1986-1987 season he also took part in the Cup Winners' Cup : Real Zaragoza arrived in the semifinal where he was defeated by Ajax. Roberto plays both challenges against the Dutch.

In 1988 he moved to Osasuna. He made his debut on 4 September at Real Madrid. Subsequently, he returns to Sabadell in Segunda División. In the 1992-1993 season he played for Palamós in the Segunda División. He continues his career in Segunda División B, with the FC Andorra and CE l'Hospitalet and makes his return to Sabadell, with whom he plays for two more seasons before retiring.

In total, in his three spells with the club, he made more than 200 appearances with Sabadell.

== Coaching career ==
After retirement from playing he worked as manager for Sabadell and Hospitalet.
