= Uwe Bredow =

German footballer

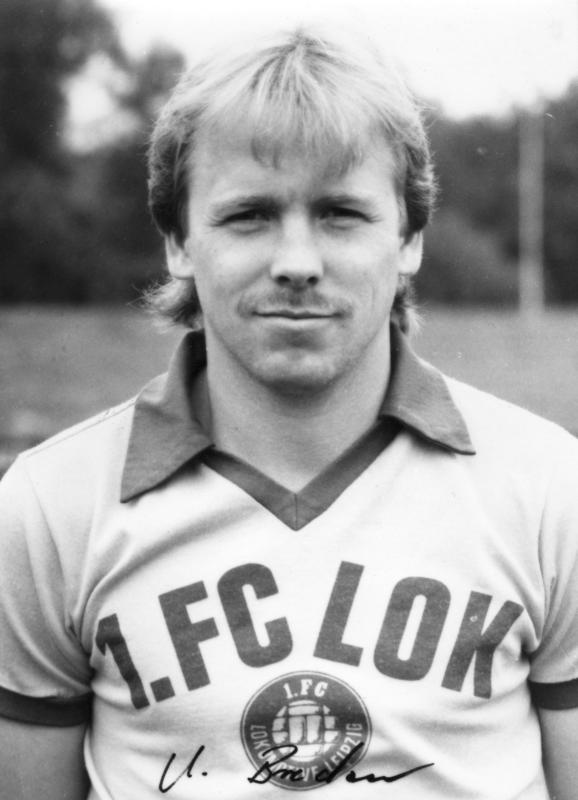

Personal information
- Date of birth: 22 August 1961 (age 65)
- Place of birth: Leipzig, East Germany
- Height: 1.74 m (5 ft 8 1/2 in)
- Position: Midfielder

Youth career
- 1969–1981: Lokomotive Leipzig

Senior career*
Years	Team	Apps	(Gls)
1981–1994	VfB Leipzig	285	(13)
Total		285	(13)

International career
	East Germany U-21	9	(0)
	East Germany Olympic	9	(0)
- * Club domestic league appearances and goals

Uwe Bredow (born 22 August 1961) is a German former footballer.
