= László Szabadi =

Hungarian footballer

Personal information
- Full name: László Szabadi
- Date of birth: 30 July 1961 (age 65)
- Place of birth: Csokonyavisonta, Hungary
- Position: Striker

Youth career
- ?–1979: Csokonyavisonta

Senior career*
Years	Team	Apps	(Gls)
1979–1981	Sellyei SK		
1981–1986	Ferencváros	106	(26)
1986–1989	Vasas SC	88	(36)
1989–1990	Beerschot		
1990	Vasas SC		
1990–1991	Eendracht Aalst		
1992–1995	Jahn Regensburg		

International career
1988	Hungary	2	(0)
- * Club domestic league appearances and goals

László Szabadi (born 30 July 1961) is a Hungarian former professional footballer who played as a striker. He made two appearances for the Hungary national football team.

== Club career ==
Szabadi played for Ferencvárosi TC between 1981 and 1986. He won two league silver medals with the team. From 1986 to 1989 he played for Vasas SC. In 1989-90 he played for K Beerschot VA in Belgium. In 1990 he returned to Vasas SC. In total, he played 194 league matches in the Hungarian top flight and scored 62 goals.

== International career ==
In 1988 Szabadi played twice for the Hungary national football team.

== Honours ==
- Nemzeti Bajnokság I: runner-up 1981–82, 1982–83
- Magyar Kupa: finalist: 1986
