= Tamás Petres =

Hungarian footballer

Personal information
- Date of birth: 3 September 1968 (age 58)
- Place of birth: Székesfehérvár, Hungary
- Position: Striker

Senior career*
Years	Team	Apps	(Gls)
1987–1989	Videoton SC	45	(22)
1990	Veszprém KC	3	(0)
1990	VSE St. Pölten	15	(2)
1991	Győri ETO FC	8	(1)
1993–1996	Honved Szondi Velence		
1996–1997	Csákvár FC		
1997–2000	Lombard FC Tatabánya		
2000	Rákospalotai EAC	9	(0)
2000–2001	Bodajk SE		

International career
1990	Hungary	4	(0)
- * Club domestic league appearances and goals

Tamás Petres (born 3 September 1968) is a retired Hungarian football striker. He was a squad member for the 1985 FIFA World Youth Championship, became Nemzeti Bajnokság I top goalscorer in 1988–89 and was capped for Hungary.
