= Hans-Jörg Leitzke =

German footballer (born 1960)

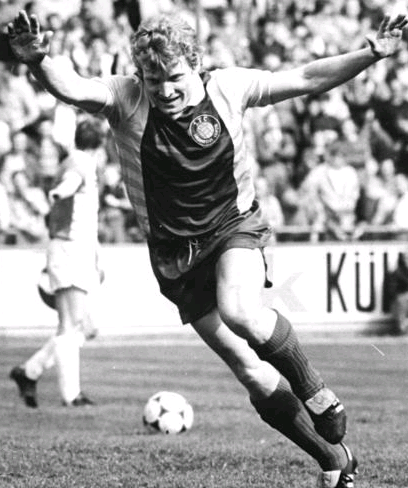
- Leitzke in 1987

Personal information
- Date of birth: 27 December 1960 (age 65)
- Place of birth: East Germany
- Height: 1.78 m (5 ft 10 in)
- Position: Forward

Youth career
- 1969–1979: Chemie Leipzig

Senior career*
Years	Team	Apps	(Gls)
1979–1985	Chemie Leipzig		
1985–1989	Lokomotive Leipzig	81	(15)
1989–1996	Sachsen Leipzig		
1996–1999	Grün-Weiß Eilenburg		
1999–2000	Bornaer SV	22	(5)

Managerial career
- 2000–2005: Sachsen Leipzig II
- 2005–2006: Sachsen Leipzig
- 2007–2008: Sachsen Leipzig
- 2009–2010: VfB Pößneck
- * Club domestic league appearances and goals

Hans-Jörg Leitzke (born 27 December 1960) is a German former football player and coach who played as a forward.
