= Matthias Lindner (footballer, born 1965) =

German footballer (born 1965)

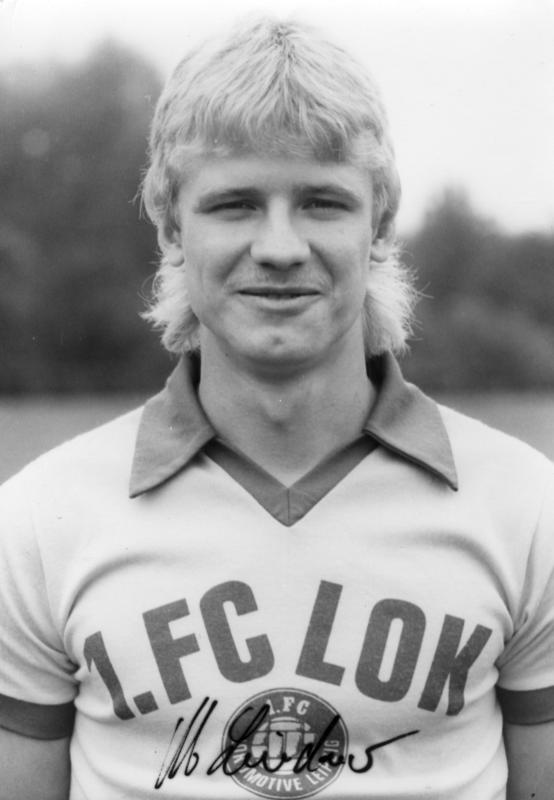
- Lindner with 1. FC Lokomotive Leipzig

Personal information
- Date of birth: 5 October 1965 (age 61)
- Place of birth: Grimma, East Germany
- Height: 1.82 m (6 ft 0 in)
- Position: Defender

Youth career
- 1972–1976: BSG Lokomotive Naunhof
- 1976–1983: 1. FC Lokomotive Leipzig

Senior career*
Years	Team	Apps	(Gls)
1983–1991	1. FC Lokomotive Leipzig	156	(18)
1991–1997	VfB Leipzig	174	(11)
1997–1998	Carl Zeiss Jena	23	(2)
1998–2000	FC Sachsen Leipzig		

International career
1987–1990	East Germany	22	(0)
- * Club domestic league appearances and goals

Matthias Lindner (born 5 October 1965) is a German former footballer who played as a defender.

Born in Grimma, East Germany, he started playing football at the age of seven, with BSG Lokomotive Naunhof and joined the youth ranks of 1. FC Lokomotive Leipzig in 1976. After making his debut in May 1983 in the DDR-Oberliga he spent another eight seasons with the first team, making 156 league appearances and stayed with the club after they were renamed to VfB Leipzig. In 1997–98 he spent a season with Carl Zeiss Jena, before retiring in 2000 with FC Sachsen Leipzig.

Lindner won 22 caps for East Germany between 1987 and 1990.
