= Wolfgang Altmann =

German footballer

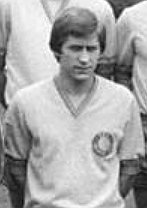
- Altmann in 1978

Personal information
- Full name: Wolfgang Altmann
- Date of birth: 22 September 1952 (age 74)
- Place of birth: Markranstädt, East Germany
- Height: 1.79 m (5 ft 10 1/2 in)
- Position: Midfielder

Senior career*
Years	Team	Apps	(Gls)
1970–1971	BSG Chemie Leipzig II	6	(0)
1971–1987	1. FC Lokomotive Leipzig	325	(36)
1979–1980	→ Vorwärts Kamenz (MS)		
1987–1991	1. FC Markkleeberg	60	(9)
- * Club domestic league appearances and goals

Wolfgang Altmann (born 22 September 1952) is a German former professional footballer who played as a midfielder.
