= AFC Ajax N.V. =

Football club in the Netherlands

- Company type: Public
- Traded as: Euronext Amsterdam: AJAX
- Industry: Sports
- Founded: 1998
- Headquarters: Amsterdam, Netherlands
- Area served: Europe; Africa; Asia; North America; South America; Australia
- Key people: Alex Kroes (CEO); Menno Geelen (Commercial Director); Susan Lenderink (Financial Director); Leen Meijaard (Chairman, Board of Commissioners)
- Products: Football club
- Revenue: ▲€ 118 million (2017)
- Operating income: ▲€ 69 million (2017)
- Net income: ▲€ 49 million (2017)
- Website: Ajax.nl

AFC Ajax NV is mostly known as a football club. Since 17 May 1998 the club is registered as a Naamloze vennootschap (N.V.) listed on the stock exchange Euronext Amsterdam. As a company the club strives to make a profit through ticket sales, as well as through income accumulated by competing in national, continental and global football. Half of the revenue is generated through club merchandise, advertising, and income from selling broadcasting rights.

Ajax is the only Dutch club with an initial public offering (IPO). Outside the Netherlands in countries such as the UK, Germany, Italy or Turkey there are more football clubs with IPOs, including Manchester United, who are accredited with advising Ajax Amsterdam to enter the stock market. Several members of Ajax Board of Commissioners have a financial background in trade. For example, former treasurer of the club Arie van Os was a famous stockbroker from Amsterdam.

Only a limited amount of the shares in AFC Ajax NV are publicly traded on the Stock Market. The "Vereniging AFC Ajax" (English: AFC Ajax Association) retain 73% of the shares. The following majority share holders are Insurance company Delta Lloyd Group with 9.95%, followed by former stockbroker Adri Strating with 8.65%.

== History ==
In 1900, Floris Stempel, Carel Reeser and Johan Dade founded the Amsterdamsche Football Club Ajax in Amsterdam.

In 1911, Ajax moved into its first stadium Het Houten Stadion playing to the max capacity of 15,000. The funding for the stadium came from Wim Eggerman, a local businessman, and president of the club at the time.

In 1922, Ajax expanded into baseball as one of the founding clubs of the newly formed Honkbal Hoofdklasse, the team won the national title four times, before the club shut down its baseball division exactly 50 years later.

In 1934, Ajax relocated to a new stadium De Meer Stadion, playing to an increased capacity of 22,000. The stadium was designed and funded by Architect and Ajax Commissioner Jordanus Roodenburgh, who had designed and completed the first stadium for Ajax as well. Ajax also played their International fixtures at the Olympic Stadium in Amsterdam to an increased capacity of 64,000.

In 1964, Jaap van Praag was made the new chairman of the club, a position he held until 1978. The period during his tenure is widely considered Ajax most glorious, with the club winning the intercontinental title, as well as the continental title three consecutive seasons (1971 to 1973).

In 1972, Ajax won the Eredivisie league title, the Dutch Cup, the European Cup, the European Super Cup and the Intercontinental Cup all in the same calendar year, also completing the European Cup treble the following year.

In 1989, Michael van Praag, the son of Jaap, became the new chairman of Ajax, a position he held until 2003. The club won the UEFA Cup in 1992 and the UEFA Champions League in 1995, winning the Intercontinental Cup once more the same year under his guidance.

In 1996, construction was completed of a new soccer specific stadium, the Amsterdam ArenA to an increased capacity of 53,052. AFC AJax NV own 13% of the new stadium, which includes a training facility Sportpark De Toekomst, itself with a capacity of 5,000. The remaining proprietorship of the stadium is held by the Government of Amsterdam.

In 1998, AFC Ajax NV was created as the club registered as a Naamloze vennootschap company and were listed on the stock exchange Euronext Amsterdam on May 17 of that year.

In 1999, AFC Ajax NV acquired 51% proprietorship of newly founded Ajax Cape Town F.C., through a merger of previous clubs Seven Stars and Cape Town Spurs, as AFC Ajax NV expanded their operations to South Africa. The remaining shares of the club were divvied between the Comitis family and the minority share holders the Efstathiou family. That same year on 18 June 1999, AFC Ajax NV acquired 51% shares of Ashanti Gold S.C., a West-African football club from Ghana, with Ashanti Goldfields Corporation retained 49% proprietorship of the club.

In 2000, AFC Ajax NV acquired 72,5% of the shares of Belgian club Germinal Beerschot with whom Ajax had formed a partnership a year earlier.

In 2003, AFC Ajax NV sold all of its shares in Germinal Beerschot back to Belgian businessman Jos Verhaegen for the symbolic price of €1, ending the fusion of both clubs and their joint operations. Ajax also sold their shares of Ashanti Gold S.C. back to Ashanti Goldfields. Instead Ajax expanded operations to Orlando, Florida, in the United States, forming Ajax America, as well as the Ajax Orlando Prospects competing in the USL Pro league, before the North American club folded in 2007.

In 2011, AFC Ajax NV opened the Ajax Hellas Youth Academy in Greece, in conjunction with George Kazianis and All Star Consultancy forming the first Ajax youth academy outside the Netherlands. Together they opened a total of 15 youth teams in Greece and Cyprus.

In 2020, AFC Ajax NV sold their 51% share in Ajax Cape Town, ending their 21-year partnership with the South African club. They cited that Ajax Cape Town have failed to produce enough talent at the level they strive for as the major reason behind the sale, with the club also failing to gain promotion to the ABSA Premiership twice, South Africa's premier football competition after being relegated in 2018

In 2023 American investor group Citibank bought 4% of the shares with 763.181 in total.

== Locations ==
AFC Ajax manufacture and market their products worldwide.

=== Europe ===
- World Headquarters and EMEA Operations: Amsterdam, Netherlands

=== North America ===
- American Headquarters: New York City, United States

=== Asia ===
- Asian Headquarters: Guangzhou, China
