= Stadiums of AFC Ajax =

Ajax is one of the most successful clubs in Dutch football. Historically, Ajax is the most successful club in the Netherlands, with 34 Eredivisie titles, 19 KNVB Cups and 9 Johan Cruyff Shields.

Ajax is historically one of the most successful clubs in the world; according to the IFFHS, Ajax were the seventh-most successful European club of the 20th century. The club is one of the five teams that has earned the right to keep the European Cup and to wear a multiple-winner badge; they won consecutively in 1971–1973. In 1972, they completed the continental treble by winning the Eredivisie, KNVB Cup, and the European Cup. Ajax's last international trophies were the 1995 Intercontinental Cup and the 1995 Champions League, where they defeated Milan in the final; they lost the 1996 Champions League final on penalties to Juventus.

Ajax is also one of three teams to achieve a seasonal treble and the Intercontinental Cup in the same season/calendar year; This was achieved in the 1971–72 season. Ajax, Juventus, Bayern Munich, and Chelsea are the four clubs to have won all three major UEFA club competitions. They have also won the Intercontinental Cup twice, the 1991–92 UEFA Cup, as well as the Karl Rappan Cup, a predecessor of the UEFA Intertoto Cup in 1962. Ajax plays at the Johan Cruyff Arena (previously known as Amsterdam Arena), which opened in 1996. They previously played at De Meer Stadion and the Amsterdam Olympic Stadium (for international matches).

== Stadiums ==
=== 1893–1900: "Het Veldje" ===
Prior to the foundation of the club in 1900, during what is considered the prehistory of the club, Ajax had played their matches on an empty field at the end of the Overtoom in the municipality of Nieuwer Amstel. An area which lied outside the city limits at the time and in 1881 had been made an extension of the Vondelpark. For ƒ15 (Dutch guilder) a day, the team could play on the field commonly known as "Het Veldje". The exact measurements of the pitch are not known, but sometimes corner kicks were taken from the sidewalk. In 1896 the area was included in the expansion of the municipality of Amsterdam, leaving Ajax in search of a new location.

=== 1900–1907: Amsterdam-Noord ===
In the beginning, the sporting ambitions of Floris Stempel and Han Dade were not reflected in the pitch the team played their matches on. Forced to play on the farmer fields of Buiksloterham in Amsterdam-Noord. There was a high demand for football pitches in the city and Ajax were forced to compete on the outskirts of the city. This proved to be especially troublesome for supporters who had to take a ferry, and then walk fifteen minutes to the field. Irrespective of these challenges, the club did manage to come in second place twice in their competition.

=== 1907–1934: Het Houten Stadion ===
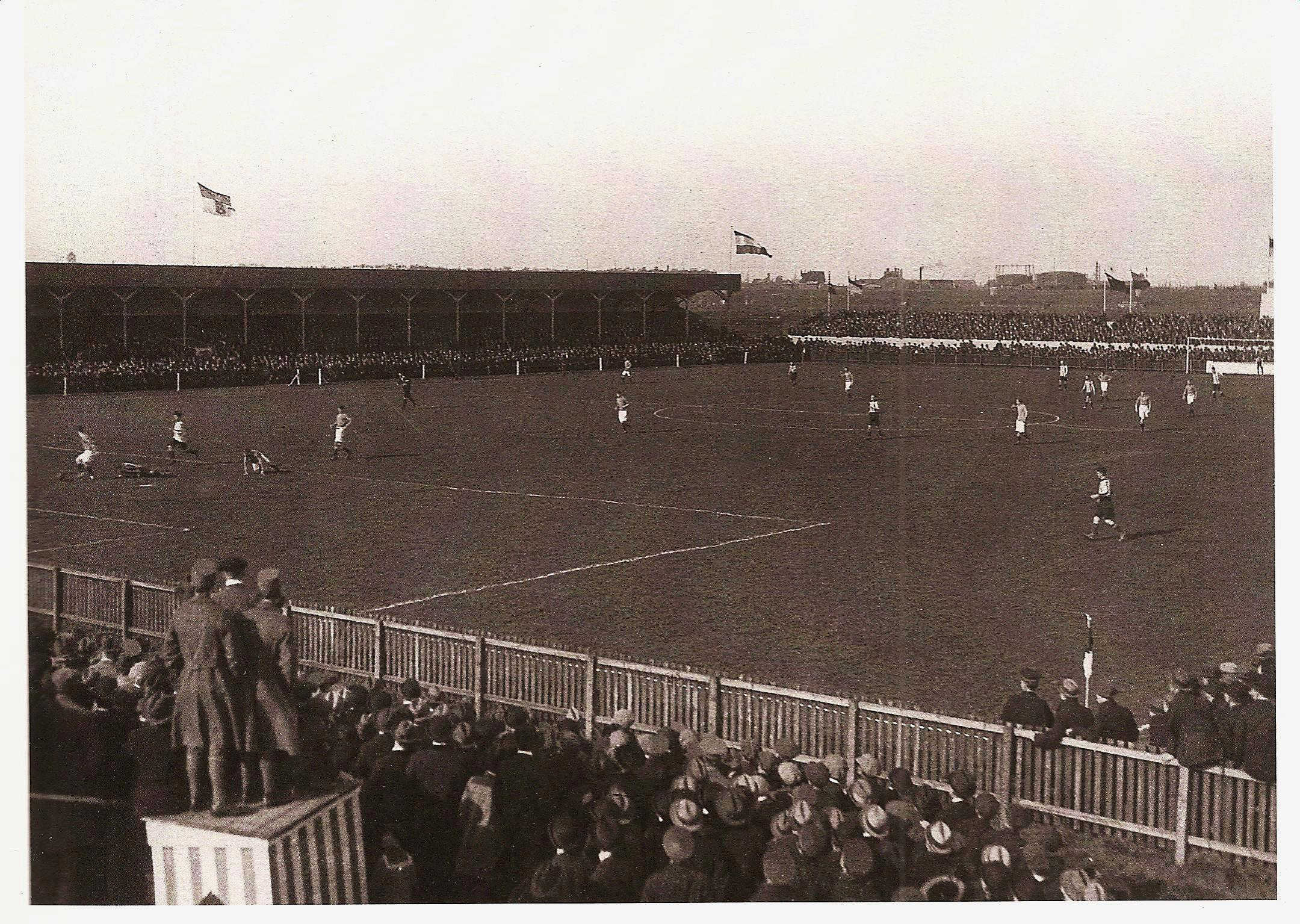
Houten Stadion, 1917

The first actual stadium the team played in was built out of necessity by honorary club member Daan Roodenburgh. Due to city planning, and housing development occurring on the club's field of choice in Amsterdam-Noord, two available pitches had been located on the Middenweg in Watergraafsmeer, Amsterdam-Oost. Situated on the polder, the new location offered a location much closer to the city center. Initially without stands, dressing rooms or running water, amenities were provided from the Café Brokelmann across the street.

In 1911, Ajax hired architect and famed Ajax supporter Daan Roodenburgh to design and build the first stands which offered covered seating along the long side of the pitch at first, as well as standing options behind the goal line. "Het Houten Stadion", as the stadium was known as, was expanded in 1916 to include additional standing and seating options surrounding the pitch. Despite the expansion, the stadium was still deemed too small with a recorded 15,000 attendees registered on 11 November 1934 during the final match against Feyenoord. People were said to have been falling over the railings, making it impossible for either team to take corners during the match.

=== 1934–1996: De Meer ===
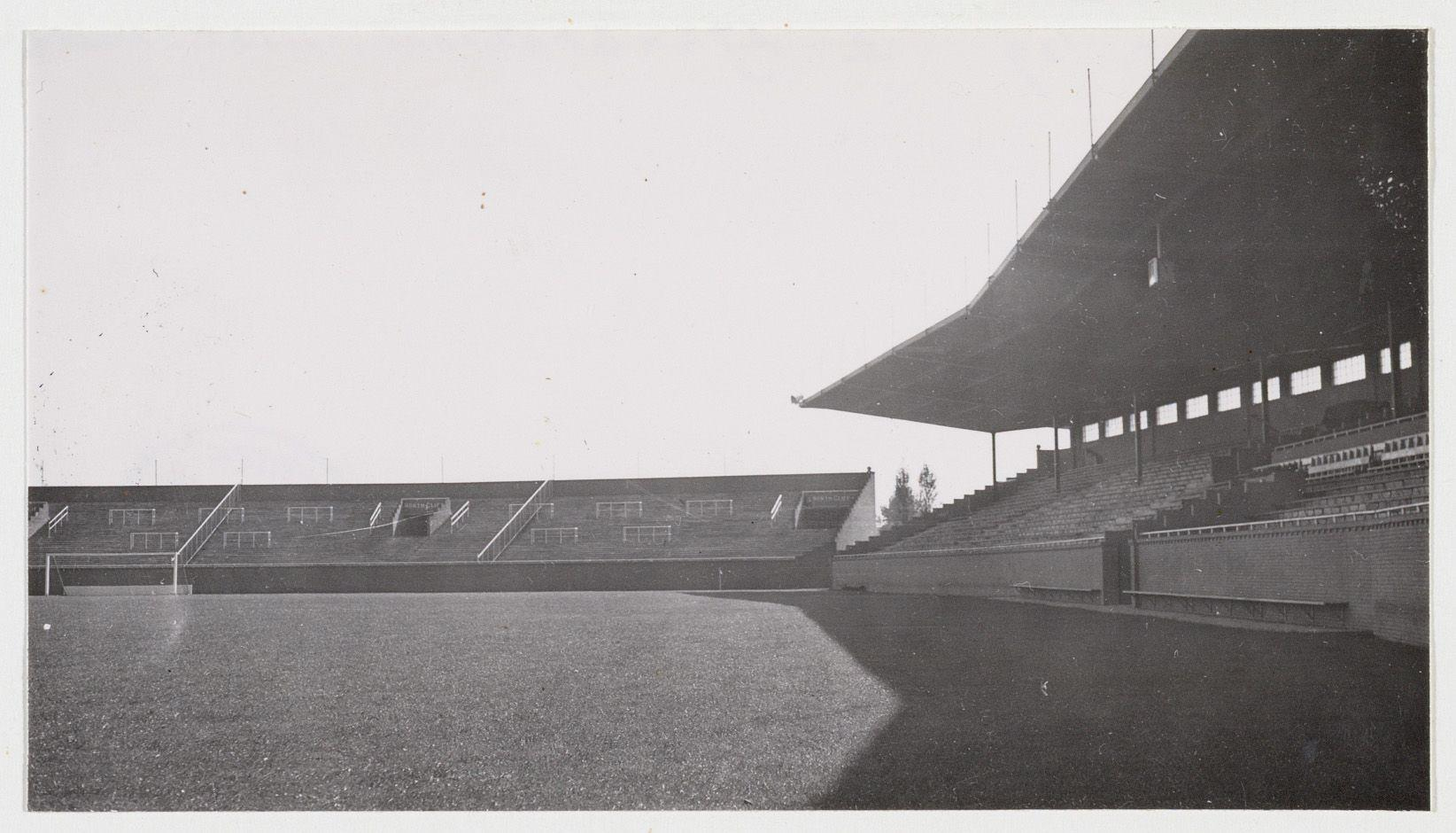
Stadion De Meer, 1937

"The value of a football stadium is not defined by its construction costs, but rather by the team that plays in it". It was with this thought in mind that the board approached the planning and development of what would become Ajax's second stadium and its home ground for the next 62 years.

"De Meer Stadion", as the stadium became known, was the home ground for Dutch football players such as Piet van Reenen, Wim Anderiesen, Rinus Michels, Sjaak Swart, Henk Groot, Johan Cruijff, Piet Keizer, Marco van Basten and countless others.

Success, as well as pressure from the league, forced the club to relocate once more in order to accommodate the high attendance, as well as to avoid the necessary annual repair costs of their first stadium. In addition the city of Amsterdam were interested in the property in Watergraafsmeer for further housing development. The club decided to move to the nearby Hoeve Voorland on the Middenweg, across from Betondorp. Again the architect of the stadium, Daan Roodenburgh, by now a member of the board at the club, was assigned by chairman Koolhaas to design a new stadium with a budget of ƒ300,000. The costs to build the stadium were covered by all club members, including the players.

The new stadium was opened on 9 December 1934. The first match contested at the new stadium was a friendly match against the now defunct Stade Français from Paris which Ajax won, 5–1. Despite lighting fixtures not being added until 1971, the stadium was exemplary in its design, with a roofed section which was quite unique at its time. The capacity of the stadium was expanded from 22,000 to 29,500 attendees over the years.

In 1965, the sitting stands across from the honorary stands were renamed to the "Reynoldstribune" in honor of head coach Jack Reynolds, who served 25 years at the club. In 1968, the Ajax Restaurant was built at the main entrance, and by 1985 all sitting and standing options in the stadium were fully covered. A year later the first skyboxes were built. The final change occurred in 1988, when the press stands were rebuilt into the main stands, which were renamed the "Jaap van Praagtribune" in honor of former chairman Jaap van Praag, who had died a year prior.

By the end of the eighties, the club's home ground had been outgrown. Considered a danger to the public, due to heightened vandalism during matches, circumstances forced the club to find a new home, with UEFA ruling that no more standing tribunes would be allowed, and the stadium regarded as too small to contain the hardcore supporters, with many expressing sorrow and pain for having to relocate once more.

=== 1930–1996: Olympisch Stadion ===
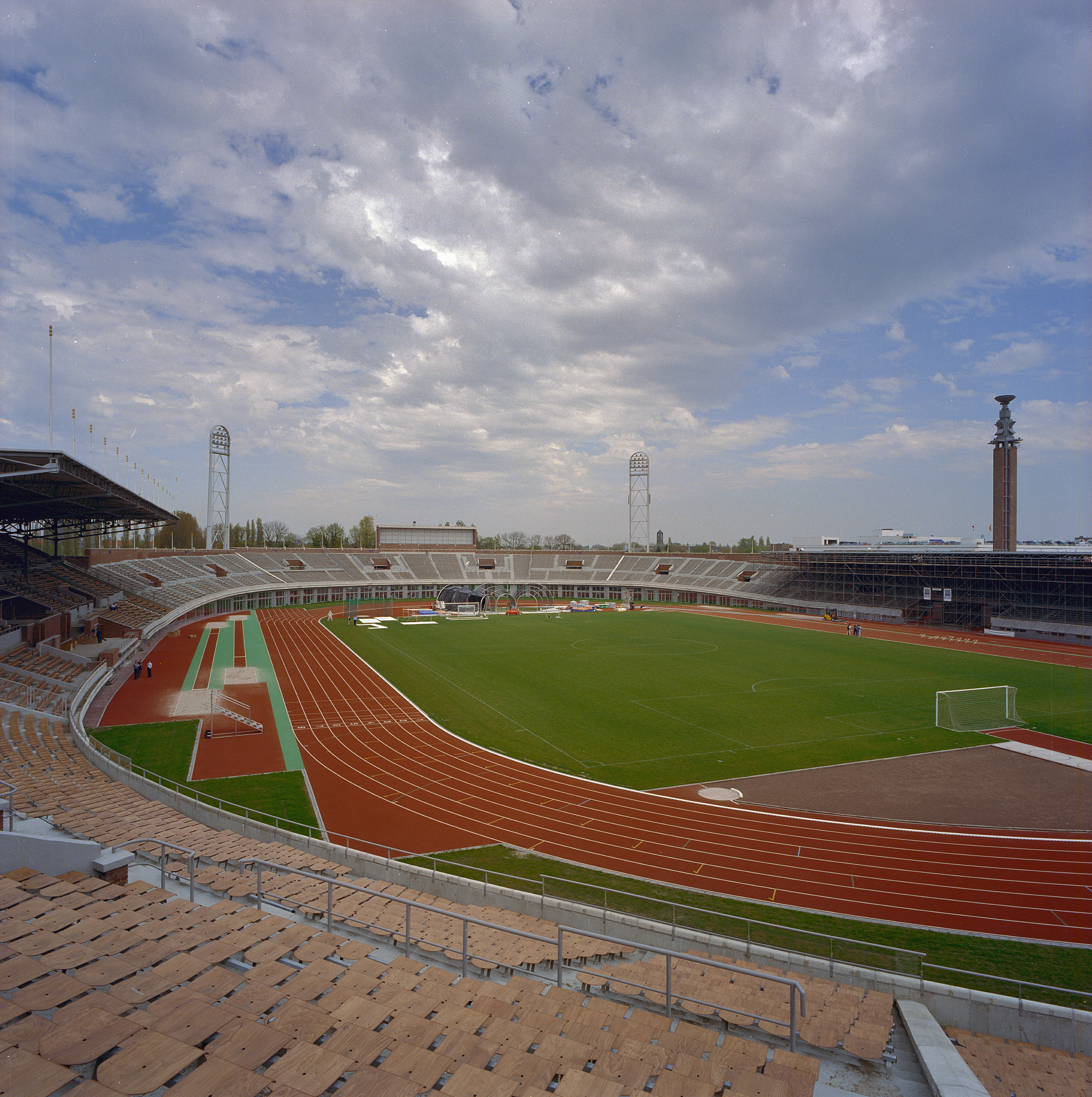
Olympic Stadium

During the time at De Meer, the Olympic Stadium in Amsterdam played an important role for the club as well. Initially serving as grounds for matches with an attendance of 20,000 or higher, it was also used when artificial lighting was necessary. Although the stadium was never in possession of the club, a multi-functional facility and not football specific grounds, many important matches were contested there.

In 1921, the city of Amsterdam were permitted to host the Olympic Games, in turn appointing architect Jan Wils to build a new stadium. The city already had a stadium that could facilitate 24,700 people, which was built in 1911, however lacking a proper running track. The stadium, located in Amsterdam-Zuid was expanded upon. The permanent home ground for cross town rivals Blauw-Wit, the stadium was sporadically used by Ajax as well.

Following competition in terms of capacity provided by the completion of De Kuip in Rotterdam in 1937, two additional concrete rings were added to expand the capacity of the stadium, raising its total capacity from 34,000 to 64,000 people. The two main reasons for Ajax to use the stadium was for its capacity, as well as for lighting purposes. Booking the stadium would prove to be problematic for Ajax, with Blauw-Wit and DWS as permanent tenants.

The most notable match held at the stadium for Ajax, is arguably the Round of 16 match of the European Cup against Liverpool in 1966. Known as De Mistwedstrijd, Ajax would go on to defeat the reigning English champions 5–1, while playing in thick fog.

=== 1996–present: Johan Cruyff Arena (Amsterdam Arena) ===
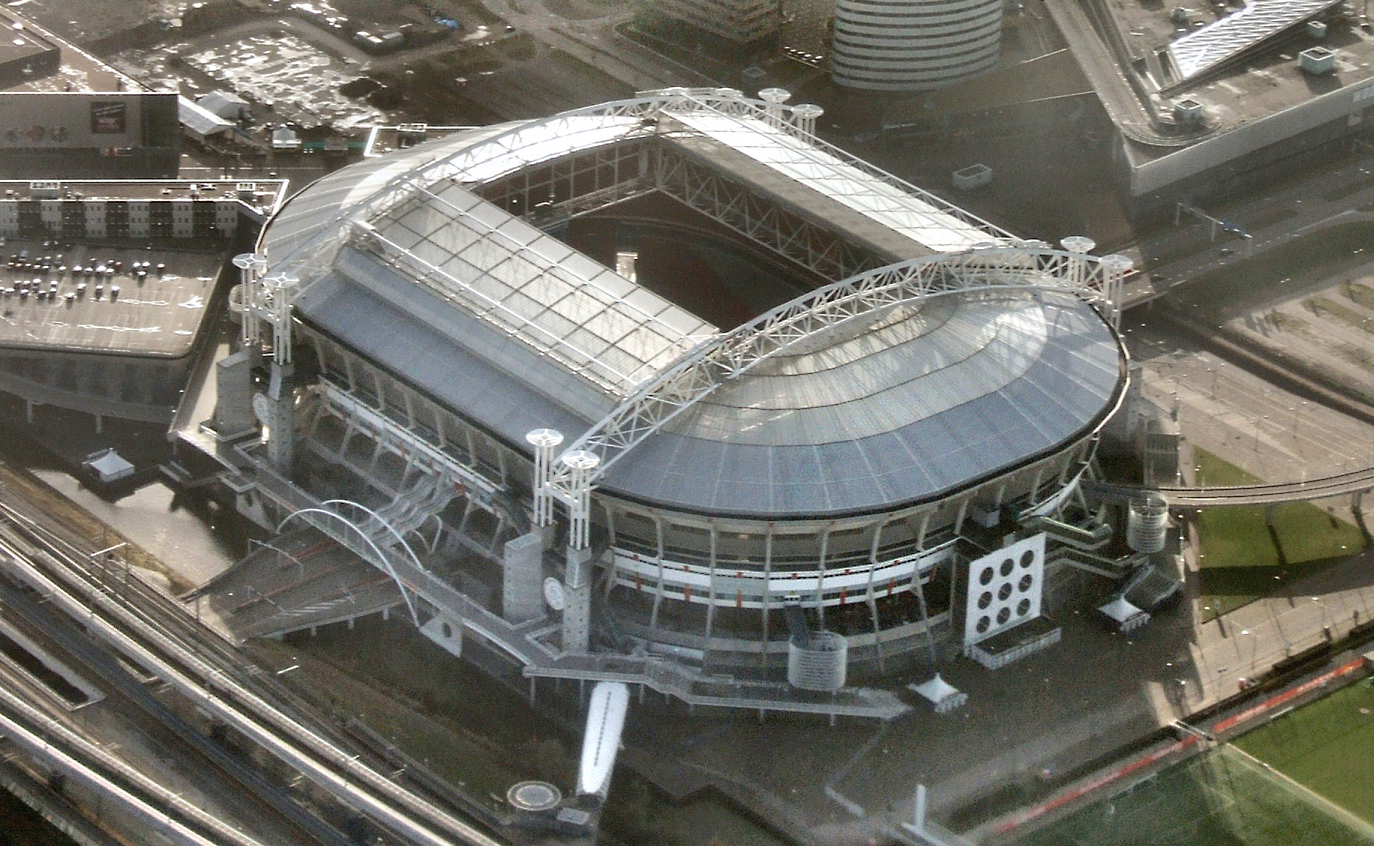
Exterior of the Johan Cruyff Arena

In 1996, Ajax moved to a new home ground in the southeast of the city known as the Amsterdam Arena, renamed as the Johan Cruyff Arena in 2018. The stadium was built by the Amsterdam city authority at a cost of $134 million. The Arena has a retractable roof and set a trend for other modern stadiums built in Europe in the following years. In the Netherlands, the Arena earned a reputation for a terrible grass pitch caused by the removable roof that, even when open, takes away too much sunlight and fresh air. During the 2008–2009 season, groundstaff introduced an artificial lighting system that finally reduced this problem considerably. The stadium has its own single rail train stop in the Halte Amsterdam ArenA and has a metro stop as well.

The much-loved De Meer stadium was torn down and the land was sold to the city council. A residential neighbourhood now occupies the area. The letters AJAX, of the old stadium are nowadays in place on the façade of the entrance at the Johan Cruyff Arena.

From the start of the 2018-2019 season, the stadium was renamed after the legendary player Johan Cruyff who died in 2016. The new name is the Johan Cruyff Arena. The stadium's current capacity is 55,865.
