= Sportpark De Toekomst =

Sporting complex in Ouder-Amstel, Netherlands

De Toekomst
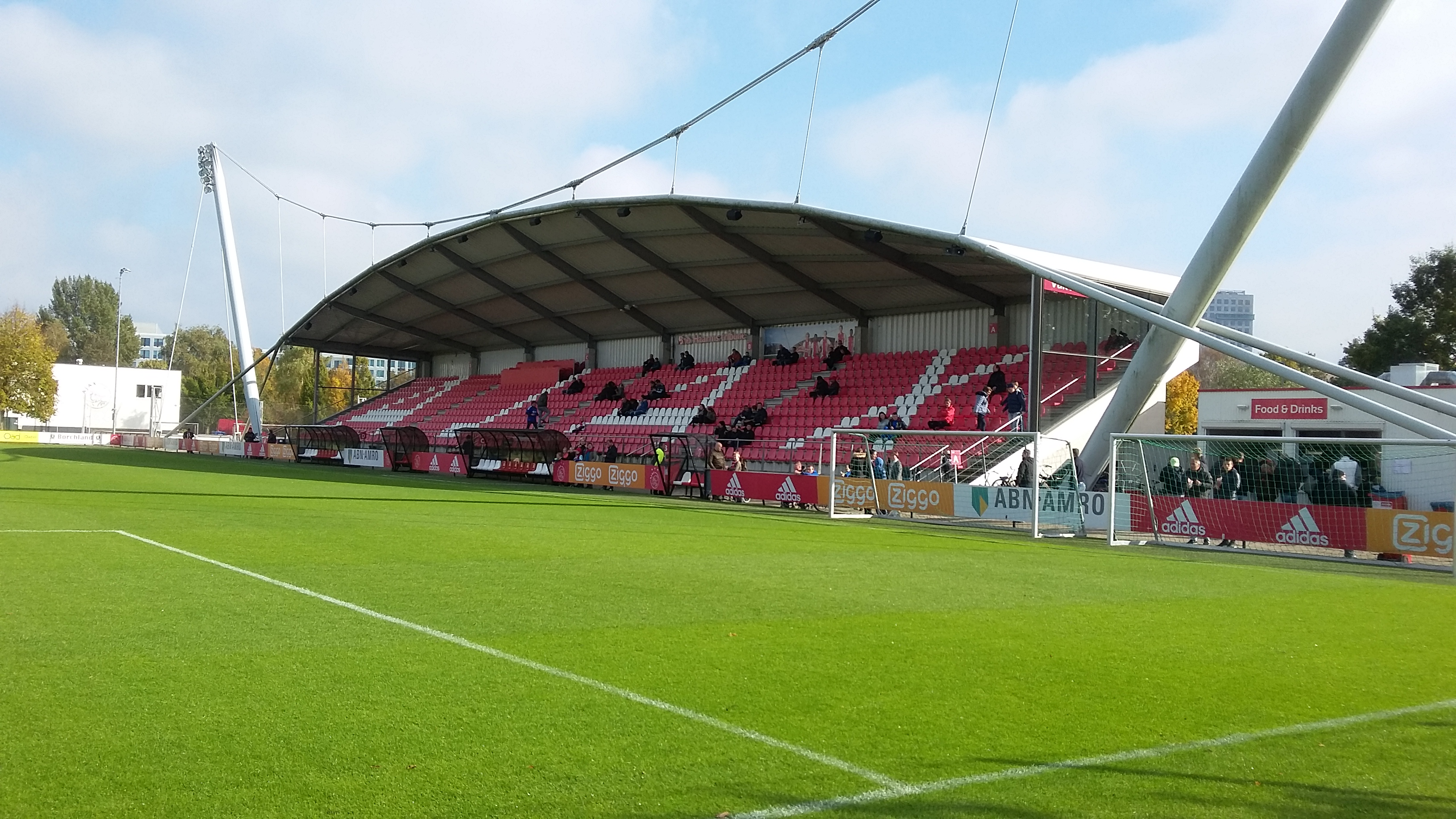
- Interactive map of De Toekomst
- Full name: Sportpark De Toekomst
- Location: Duivendrecht (Ouder-Amstel), Netherlands
- Coordinates: 52°18′48″N 4°55′44″E
- Owner: Ajax
- Operator: Ajax
- Capacity: 2,250 seats (main field)
- Surface: GrassMaster by Tarkett Sports and Artificial Turf

Construction
- Built: 1993–1996
- Opened: 14 August 1996
- Expanded: 2013
- Architect: René van Zuuk

Tenants
- Ajax Vrouwen (Women's); Jong Ajax (Reserves); Ajax Zaterdag (Amateurs); Ajax Jeugd (youth teams)

Sportcomplex De Toekomst (Dutch for Sporting complex The Future) is a sporting complex in Ouder-Amstel, Netherlands, owned by Ajax. The complex comprises nine football fields and is located close to the Johan Cruyff Arena and on the outskirts of Amsterdam. Its main field has seating capacity for 2,250 people.

The facility serves as the home grounds of Ajax Women, which competes in the Eredivisie Vrouwen, the reserves team Jong Ajax, which competes in the Eerste Divisie, as well as Ajax Amateurs, which competes in the Derde Divisie.

De Toekomst also serves as the training grounds for the first team of Ajax as well as for the Ajax Youth Academy; A-juniors (A1, A2), B-juniors (B1, B2), C-juniors (C1, C2), D-pupils (D1, D2, D3), E-pupils (E1, E2, E3) and the F-pupils (F1, F2, F3). It also serves as the home of the Future Cup, an International tournament for under-17 youth teams, which was named after the sport park.

== History ==
In 1991, it was decided that the former De Meer Stadion of Ajax, situated in Watergraafsmeer would be replaced by the new Amsterdam ArenA, which in turn called for new training grounds for both the amateur and youth teams of the club. Sportpark Voorland, situated behind the old stadium was considered too small, and was to be demolished to make room for housing.

Originally, Ajax had intended to establish their facilities at Sportpark Strandvliet on the Zwartelaantje, while the tenants present SV Amstelland refused to relocate at the time. This eventually led to Ajax shifting their focus to Sportpark De Toekomst in Ouder-Amstel. The previous tenants, TOS-Actief, were willing to vacate the premises and the new stadium was built and opened in 1996.

== Design ==
The Sport park was designed by René van Zuuk. It comprises five grass football pitches, two artificial turf pitches, a covered grandstand with 1250 seats, and bleachers along with a club house seating 250. Since the reserves team Jong Ajax (Ajax 2), have competed in the Eerste Divisie since the 2013–14 season, which saw the expansion of an additional 800 seats on the main stand, and an additional 100 seats for the supporters of the visiting team.

The main stand has a bent canopy hanging off two leaning pillars. Van Zuik received the National Steel Price, in the category of "characteristic steel components". Since 6 June 2009, the main stands at De Toekomst are named after the deceased Bobby Haarms, a former coach and honorary member of the club.

The letters ajax, visible on the training sites main grandstand, are a replica of the ones that were previously mounted on Ajax old grounds at De Meer Stadion. The original letters hang above the entrance at the Johan Cruyff Arena.

== See also ==
Teams

- AFC Ajax
- AFC Ajax (amateurs)
- AFC Ajax (women)
- Jong Ajax
- Ajax Youth Academy

Stadia

- Het Houten Stadion
- De Meer Stadion
- Olympic Stadium (Amsterdam)
- Johan Cruijff Arena

== Bibliography ==
- (in Dutch) Nederlands Architectuurinstituut, Architectuur in Nederland - Jaarboek 1996-1997, NAi Uitgevers, Rotterdam, 1997, ISBN 90-5662-040-1
- (in Dutch) David Endt, Het officiële Ajax jaarboek 1996-1997, Luitingh-Sijthoff, Amsterdam, 1997, ISBN 90-245-2162-9
- (in Dutch) Evert Vermeer and Marcel van Hoof, Ajax 100 jaar - jubileumboek 1900-2000, Luitingh-Sijthoff, Amsterdam, 2000, ISBN 90-245-3497-6
