= History of AFC Ajax =

History of a Dutch football club

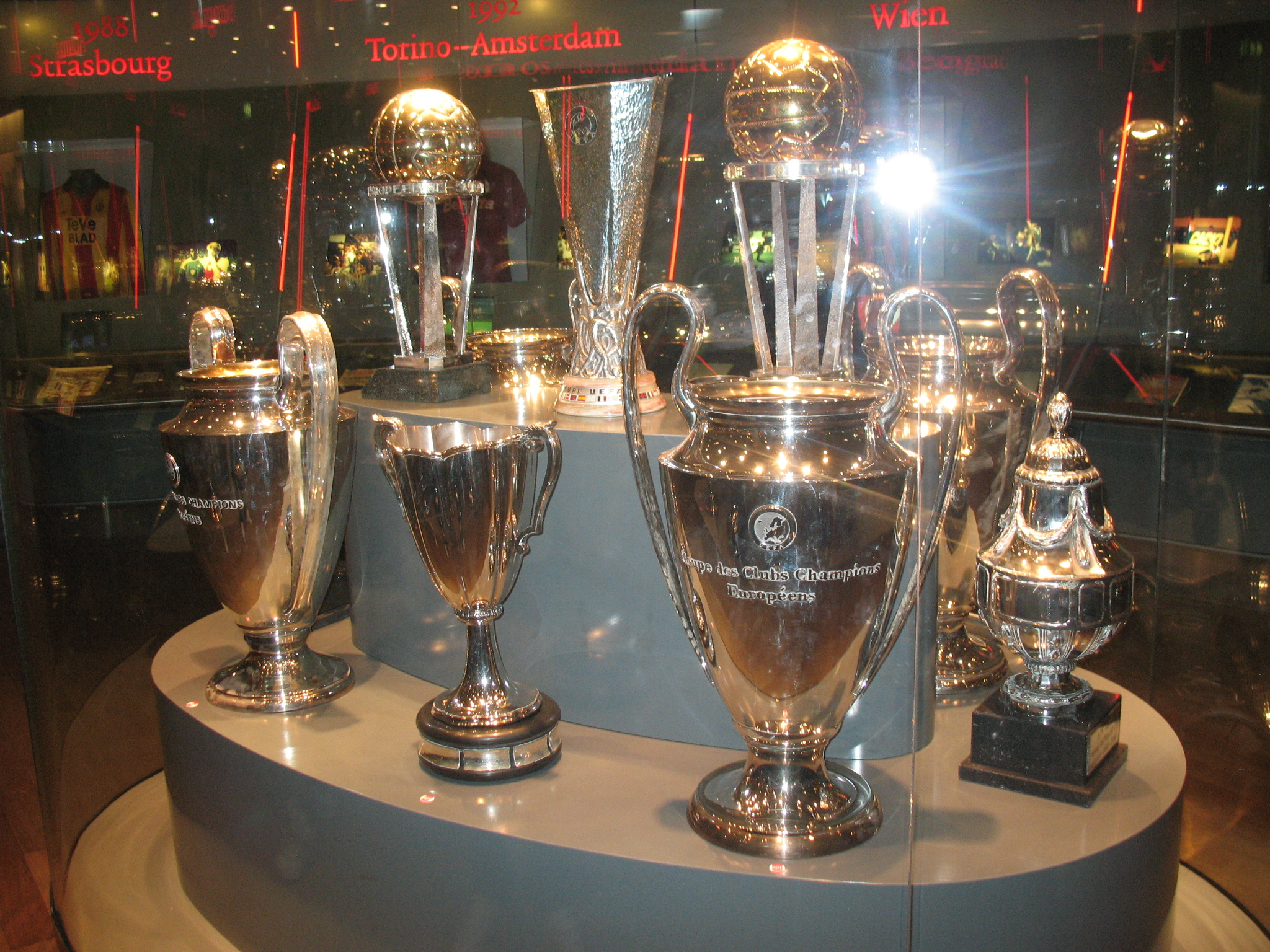
Several of Ajax' international trophies, including the Champions League and Intercontinental Cup trophies.

AFC Ajax is one of the most successful clubs in Dutch football. Historically, Ajax is the most successful club in the Netherlands, with 36 Eredivisie titles and 20 KNVB Cups.

Ajax is historically one of the most successful clubs in the world; according to the IFFHS, Ajax were the seventh-most successful European club of the 20th century. The club is one of the five teams that has earned the right to keep the European Cup and to wear a multiple-winner badge; they won consecutively in 1971–1973. In 1972, they completed the continental treble by winning the Eredivisie, KNVB Cup, and the European Cup. Ajax's last international trophies were the 1995 Intercontinental Cup and the 1995 Champions League, where they defeated Milan in the final; they lost the 1996 Champions League final, on penalties to Juventus.

Ajax is also one of three teams to win the continental treble and the Intercontinental Cup in the same season/calendar year; This was achieved in the 1971–72 season. Ajax, Juventus, Bayern Munich, Manchester United and Chelsea are the five clubs to have won all three major UEFA club competitions. They have also won the Intercontinental Cup twice, the 1991–92 UEFA Cup, as well as the Karl Rappan Cup, a predecessor of the UEFA Intertoto Cup, in 1962. Ajax plays at the Johan Cruyff Arena (previously known as Amsterdam Arena), which opened in 1996. They previously played at De Meer Stadion and the Amsterdam Olympic Stadium (for international matches).

== Amateur era ==
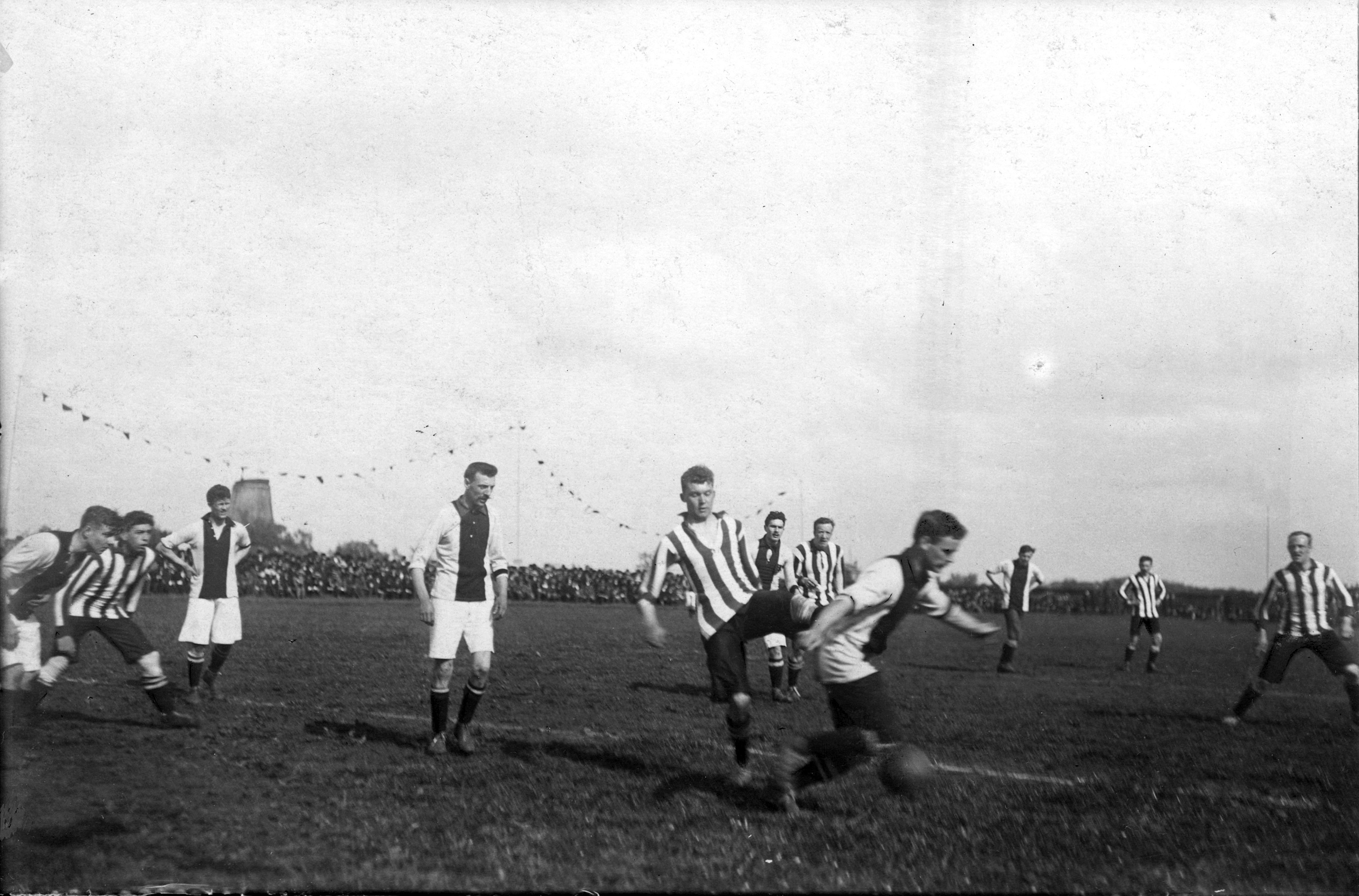
Ajax v Sparta Rotterdam at Prinsenlaan stadium of Rotterdam in 1912

The club was founded in Amsterdam on 18 March 1900 by Floris Stempel, Carel Reeser and Han Dade, the second incarnation after a short-lived previous attempt—as Football Club Ajax—in 1894. The club was named after the mythological hero Ajax, a Greek who fought in the Trojan War against Troy. In The Iliad, Ajax was said to be the greatest of all the Greeks next to his cousin Achilles, and even fought an inconclusive duel with Troy's champion, Hector. According to most accounts, Ajax died by suicide, thus, unlike Achilles, he died unconquered.

Ajax succeeded in promotion to the highest level of Dutch football in 1911 under the guidance of Jack Kirwan, their first official coach. The promotion meant that Ajax were forced to alter the club's strip, as Sparta of Rotterdam had the same kit, red-white vertical stripes with black shorts. Ajax adopted a broad vertical red stripe on a white background with white shorts, which remains the club's kit colours to this day.

Although their efforts were not unnoticed (Gé Fortgens became a frequent member of the Netherlands national team for many years), they were relegated in 1914. While they immediately bounced back, they had to wait until 1917 to regain higher level status again: they did become league champions in both 1915 (Second Division Nood West B) and 1916 (Second Division West C), however the 1915 league was declared unofficial (due to World War I), whereas in 1916 they did not make it through the promotion round (Promotion Competition 2nd Division West).

Under the guidance of Jack Reynolds (Kirwan's successor as of 1915), the club was promoted to the highest level in 1917 and won the Dutch national cup final, defeating VSV 5–0. Ajax went on to win their first national championship in 1918. The championship was secured in Tilburg where they faced Willem II without Jan de Natris, arguably the club's first star player, who missed the train to Tilburg and opted to stay in Amsterdam instead, earning him a fine of ten cents. In the following season, he received a six-month ban, though Ajax nonetheless performed well in his absence; not only did they retain the championship title, their 1919 campaign was also an unbeaten run for them, an accomplishment that was only repeated 76 years later by Ajax themselves.

Ajax moved into the 'De Meer' stadium in 1934

Now a regular contender for the Western Regional championship in the Netherlands, Ajax marched through the 1920s with regional titles in 1921, 1927 and 1928, in addition to a few minor cup victories. The 1930s would prove to be more successful, however; with household names as Wim Anderiesen Sr., Dolf van Kol, Piet Strijbosch, Wim Volkers, Jan van Diepenbeek, Bob ten Have, Erwin van Wijngaarden and prolific striker Piet van Reenen, Ajax' period from the late '20s until World War II was so successful that many people dubbed it "the golden age" (a reference to the 17th century, the heyday of the Dutch Republic).

With eight regional titles (1930–32, 1934–37 and 1939) and five national championships (1931, 1932, 1934, 1937 and 1939), Ajax was the most successful team of that era in the country. The 1930s were also notable for the final culmination of the rivalry with Feyenoord, another squad that earned many awards in that time, as well as the creation of the stadium 'het Ajax-Stadion' dubbed 'De Meer' (named after the borough of its residence). Until the emergence of the Amsterdam Arena in 1996, this was Ajax' home ground together with the Olympic Stadium for higher-profile games.

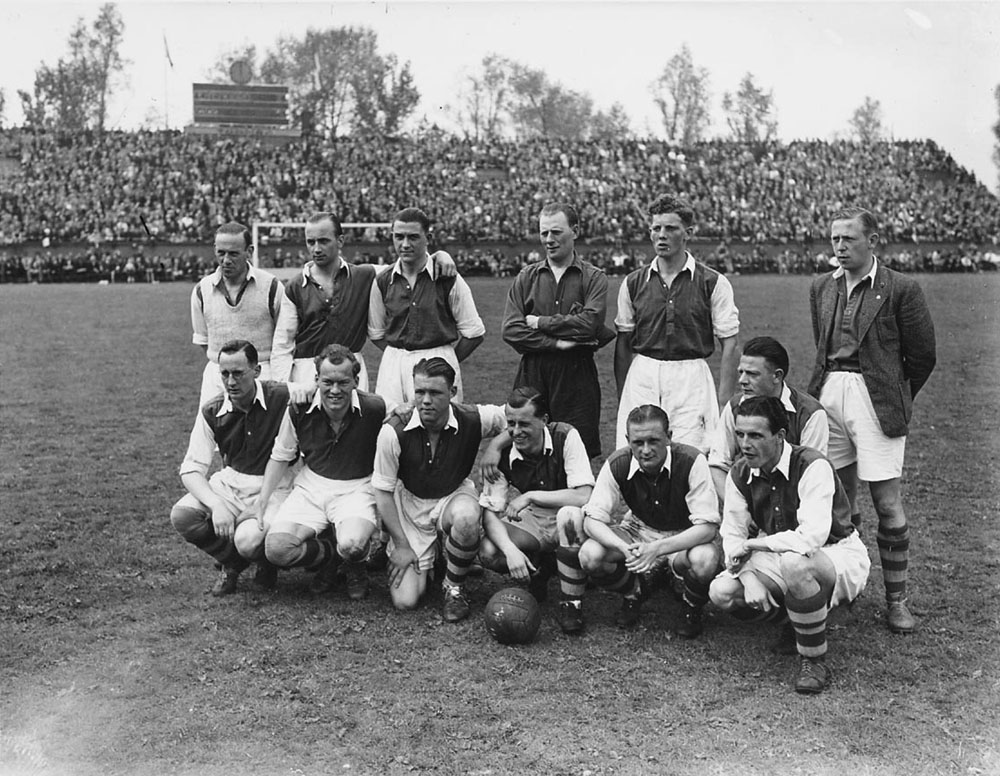
An Ajax team of 1947

As of the 1940s, perhaps in line with Jack Reynolds' retirement (he had stayed – save for a few spells of absence – on for the entire time as Ajax' manager since his entry in 1915), Ajax went through a period of rebuilding. Gerrit Fischer and Erwin van Wijngaarden were retained, with Joop Stoffelen, Guus Dräger, Gé van Dijk, Jan Potharst and later Rinus Michels and Cor van der Hart brought in. After a Cup Final victory in 1943, Ajax went on to finish second in the championship league in 1946 (behind HFC Haarlem) followed by a league championship win in 1947.

They became regional champions in 1950 again, though they never came near winning the championship. The season was notable for a match against SC Heerenveen, with Heerenveen coming back from 5–1 down to win 6–5. In 1941, Ajax performed the opposite: after being 6–0 behind to VUC in The Hague they managed to pull out a draw in the end (6–6).

Until 1954, the year that professional football was introduced in the Netherlands, Ajax had some minor successes, with the regional title in 1952 and a second place in the regional championship in 1954 (equal in points with fellow Amsterdam club DWS).

== Professional football and the road to the top ==
In 1955, professional football was finally permitted in the Netherlands. Ajax was still far from the international top, as was demonstrated in the European Cup match against Vasas SC, where they were beaten by the Hungarians 4–0 in the Népstadion. Similar European failures followed in 1960, with Ajax being knocked out by the Norwegian amateurs of Fredrikstad FK and in the Cup Winners' Cup in 1961 by Újpest of Ferenc Bene.

Ajax achieved some success on the domestic level, earning the first Eredivisie-championship in 1957 and again in 1960, the 1960 title decided by a playoff after equalling in points with arch-rivals Feyenoord. Ajax cruised to a 5–1 victory with a hat trick by striker Wim Bleijenberg.

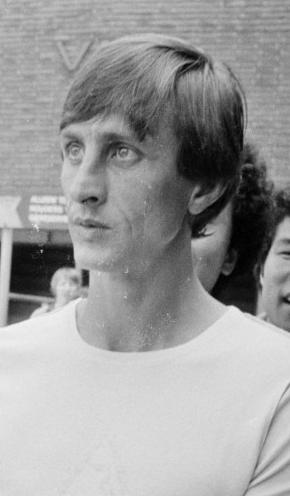
Johan Cruyff played at Ajax between 1959–73 and 1981–83, winning 3 European Cups; his #14 is the only squad number Ajax has ever retired. Cruyff came back to manage the club from 1985 to 1988.

Bleijenberg was not the top scorer, however. Henk Groot – the younger brother of Cees Groot, who had scored 100 goals for Ajax in his five-year stay – arrived in 1959 from Stormvogels and scored 38 goals in 1959–60 and 41 in 1960–61. He was a vital part of Ajax in the early 1960s, replacing star striker Piet van der Kuil, who had left for PSV in 1960. Alongside the man who would later become Mister Ajax, Sjaak Swart, Co Prins, Ton Pronk, Bennie Muller and a young Piet Keizer, Ajax added the National Cup in 1961 and the Intertoto Cup 1962 to their trophy cabinet.

After missing out on the championship after a 5–2 defeat against PSV in 1963, Ajax entered a period of decline in the national league. Henk Groot left to Feyenoord that summer, and in 1964–65, they were near relegation. Things improved after former player Rinus Michels replaced Vic Buckingham as the head manager. Ajax managed to secure a midtable spot under Michels; however, Buckingham's second tenure saw the introduction of Johan Cruyff during a 3–1 loss at GVAV.

Michels started a revolution in Amsterdam, beginning with the return of Henk Groot and Co Prins, as well as the signing of goalkeeper Gert Bals. Michels built a side around the vision of "Total Football," sacrificing players who he considered not to be good enough or fit the style of play. The most notable example of this was defender Frits Soetekouw – replaced by Ajax' new captain Velibor Vasović – whose own goal aided the victory of Dukla Prague in the quarter-final of the European Cup in 1966–67, after Ajax had knocked out Beşiktaş and defeated Liverpool 5–1 at the Mistwedstrijd.

Ajax sealed their second consecutive championship in 1967. They were not as dominant as the previous year, but with a seemingly unstoppable attack, they scored no less than 122 goals (still a national record), of which 33 were from Johan Cruyff, who, at just 20 years of age, was already the team's star player. It was also the season for another important milestone—for the first time in history, Ajax won the double (after defeating NAC Breda in the cup final).

It earned them European Cup qualification, being knocked out by Real Madrid in the subsequent season, with Veloso scoring the winner for Los Merengues in extra time after two 1–1 draws, results which greatly enhanced the reputation of the club.

Ajax won the Dutch title of 1968 overtaking Feyenoord, the league leaders for much of the season, and reached the European Cup final of 1969 in Madrid against Milan. In qualifying for the European Cup Final, Ajax defeated 1. FC Nürnberg in the first round. They were almost knocked out by Benfica in the second, losing 1–3 to them in Amsterdam but winning the second leg in Lisbon, 1–3. The decisive third match in neutral Paris was won 3–0 through two goals by Inge Danielsson and one by Cruyff. They repeated this score at home against the next opponent, Czechoslovak club Spartak Trnava, in the next round, but struggled in the second leg, narrowly qualifying on aggregate. In the final, Milan, lauded for their excellent defence and counter-attacks, easily won 4–1, with Pierino Prati opening the scoring after seven minutes and going on to score a hat-trick, while Velibor Vasović was the only Ajax player on the scoresheet after scoring from a penalty. Milan's win was capped by a goal by Angelo Sormani.

== Gloria Ajax: European dominance and treble ==
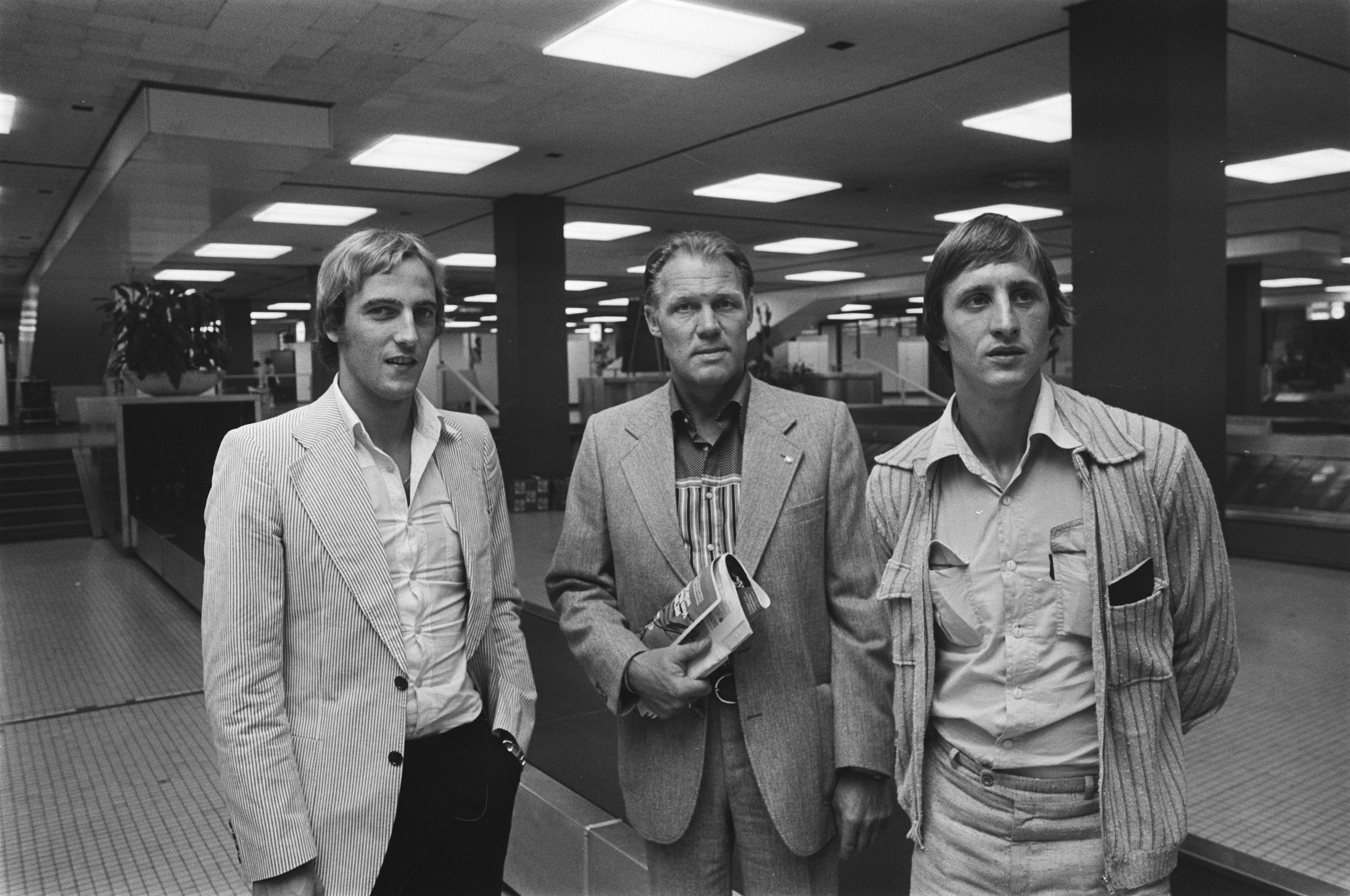
Three of the most notable figures of the Totaalvoetbal school: Johan Neeskens, Rinus Michels and Johan Cruyff, at Amsterdam Airport in August 1976.

Following their loss in the European Cup Final, Ajax entered another period of rebuilding. Among the new additions were national top scorer Dick van Dijk and midfielders Gerrie Mühren and Nico Rijnders, while a second team player, Ruud Krol, was promoted to the first XI. They replaced Klaas Nuninga, Inge Danielsson, Theo van Duijvenbode (all sold to other clubs) and Henk Groot, who retired from football after an injury while playing against Poland. Ton Pronk and Bennie Muller were no longer as frequently in the first 11 after many years of service.

In 1969–70, Ajax won the Dutch league championship, winning 27 out of 34 games and scoring 100 goals. Feyenoord remained in contention throughout the season, but they had to settle for second place. Both clubs won a trophy, however, with Ajax winning the Eredivisie title while Feyenoord captured the European Cup. Ajax reached the semi-finals of the Inter-Cities Fairs Cup in 1970 (being knocked out by Arsenal after defeating Hannover 96, Napoli, Ruch Chorzów and Carl Zeiss Jena).

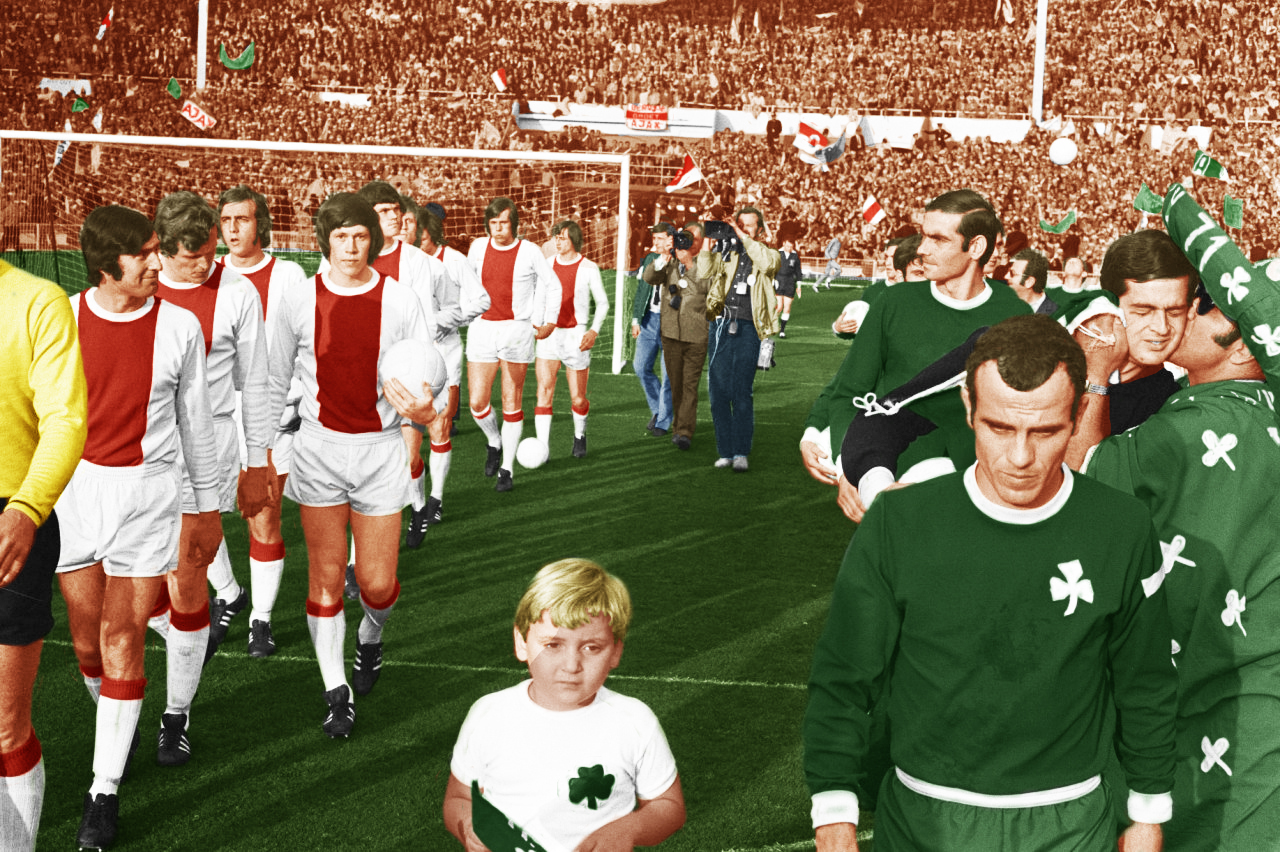
1970–71 European Cup Final Ajax-Panathinaikos 2–0 in London, June 1971.

The year 1971 became the long-awaited year of glory, with Ajax winning trophies at both domestic and European level. For a substantial part of the season, Ajax seemed to be on their way to the European treble (a feat only previously performed by Celtic in 1967). Domestically, Ajax finished second to Feyenoord in the league, winning the KNVB Cup after a replayed final against Sparta Rotterdam. In Europe, Ajax defeated 17 Nëntori, FC Basel, Celtic and Atlético Madrid en route to the 1971 European Cup Final played at Wembley Stadium on June 2. There, 83,000 spectators witnessed a 2–0 victory over Panathinaikos, with goals from Dick van Dijk and an Arie Haan shot deflected by defender Kapsis. Captain Velibor Vasović could finally lift the European Cup after having lost two previous finals in 1966 with FK Partizan and again in 1969.

In the following years, Ajax established itself as the foremost club in European football. Romanian coach Stefan Kovacs replaced Michels in 1971, while Rijnders and Vasović departed in the same year; Van Dijk departed in 1972. Such changes in the side and management did not disrupt the success of the club, however, with Ajax completing the treble of European Cup, Dutch National Championship and the KNVB Cup in 1972 to which was added the Intercontinental Cup. In 1973, Ajax won a third consecutive European Cup and another Dutch championship; however, defeat in the KNVB Cup meant Ajax missed out on a second consecutive treble.

The departure of Johan Cruyff for Barcelona in 1973 signalled the end of the period of success, effectively ending the reign of the so-called "12 Apostles," the typical starting XI of Heinz Stuy, Wim Suurbier, Barry Hulshoff, Horst Blankenburg, Ruud Krol, Arie Haan, Johan Neeskens, Gerrie Mühren, Sjaak Swart, Johan Cruyff and Piet Keizer, plus the usual 12th man, usually Ruud Suurendonk until 1972, then Johnny Rep. Whereas clubs like Real Madrid, Bayern Munich, Internazionale, Arsenal, Juventus and Independiente were beaten by Ajax between 1971 and 1973, failure in the European Cup at the hands of CSKA Sofia in late 1973 signalled the decline of Ajax in European football.

Ajax's attempts to find a replacement for Cruyff after his departure proved difficult. A bid for Tom Lund, who had become established on the Norway national football team, but who at club level played at Norwegian tier 3 with Lillestrøm SK at the time, fell through as Lund didn't want to commit to a long contract abroad.

Nevertheless, the "Total Football" that they had propagated became a lasting memory for many football fans, contributing to the Netherlands national team reaching the final of the 1974 FIFA World Cup using similar tactics. The decline of Ajax and the loss to the West Germans in the World Cup Final saw the end of the Total Football era. Years later, Ajax manager Tomislav Ivić would dub the era Gloria Ajax, illustrating the impact of the team's years at the pinnacle of European football.

== First renaissance and 1980s ==
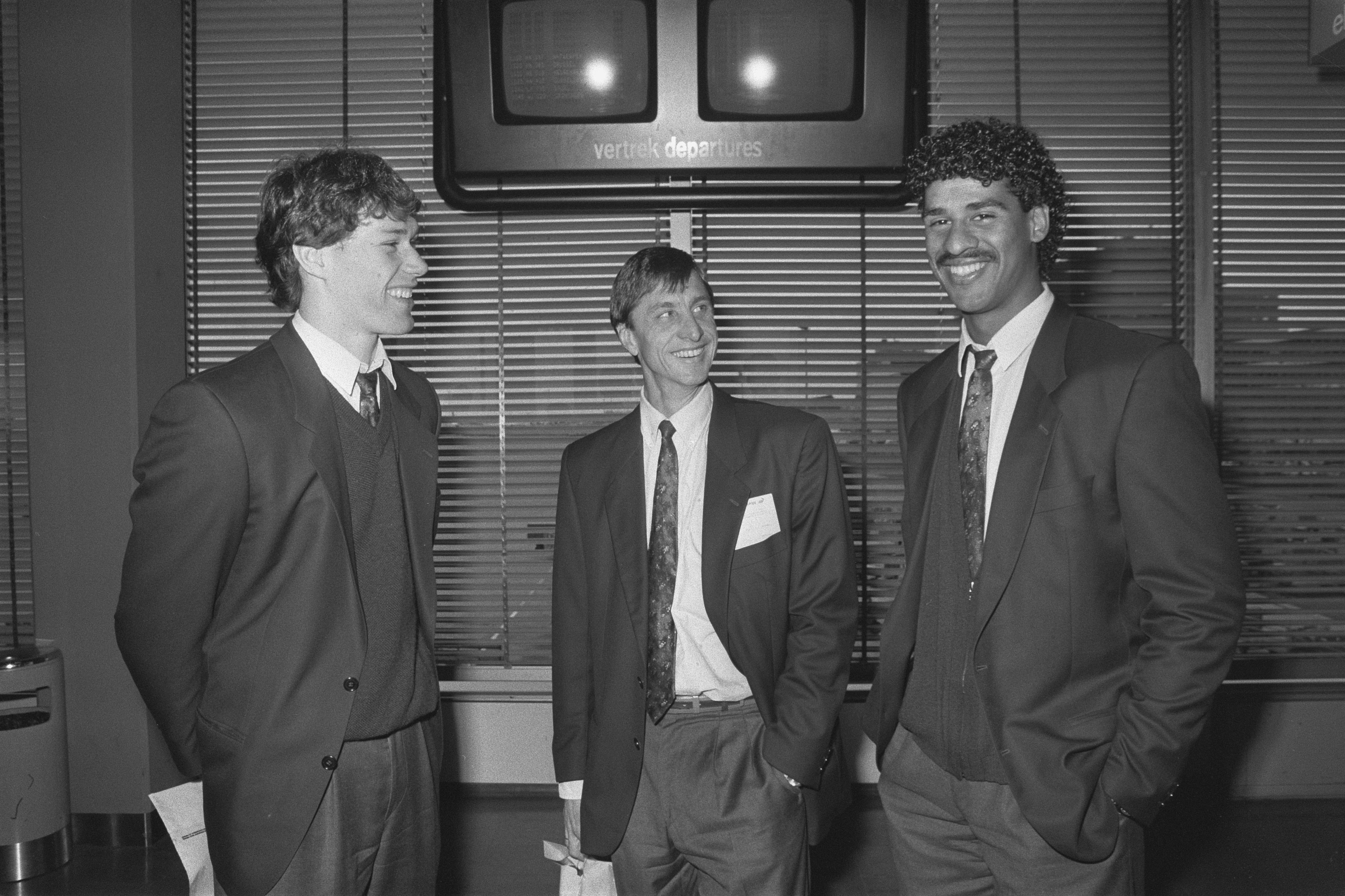
Van Basten, Cruyff and Rijkaard in November 1986, on their journey to Greece (Piraeus).

After a period of decline, in 1977, with players like Frank Arnesen, Dick Schoenaker, Søren Lerby, Tscheu La Ling, Ruud Geels and Simon Tahamata, Tomislav Ivić coached Ajax to their first domestic championship since 1973 (Ajax had finished three successive years only as third in the Dutch league in 1974, 1975 and 1976). Ajax returned to domestic success winning five league championships after 1977 (till 1985), finishing only two times second and one time third, as well as playing seven national cup finals (till 1987), and winning four national cups, though impressive European performances were sparse till early 1986. Ajax were knocked out by Juventus in the quarter-finals of the European Cup in March 1978 and reached a European Cup semi-final in April 1980, losing to eventual winners Nottingham Forest, scoring 31 goals in the tournament, with 8 goals against. Disappointing European form between late 1980 and early 1986 saw the club failing to progress past the second round for six consecutive seasons. Johan Cruyff returned to the club in late November 1980 as advisor and in December 1981 as player, with the club producing some talented youngsters in the early- and mid-1980s, such as Wim Kieft, Frank Rijkaard, Gerald Vanenburg, Sonny Silooy, Jesper Olsen, John van 't Schip, Marco van Basten, Jan Molby, Ronald Koeman, John Bosman, Stanley Menzo, Rob de Wit, Aron Winter and Rob Witschge in sequence of their first official match for Ajax.

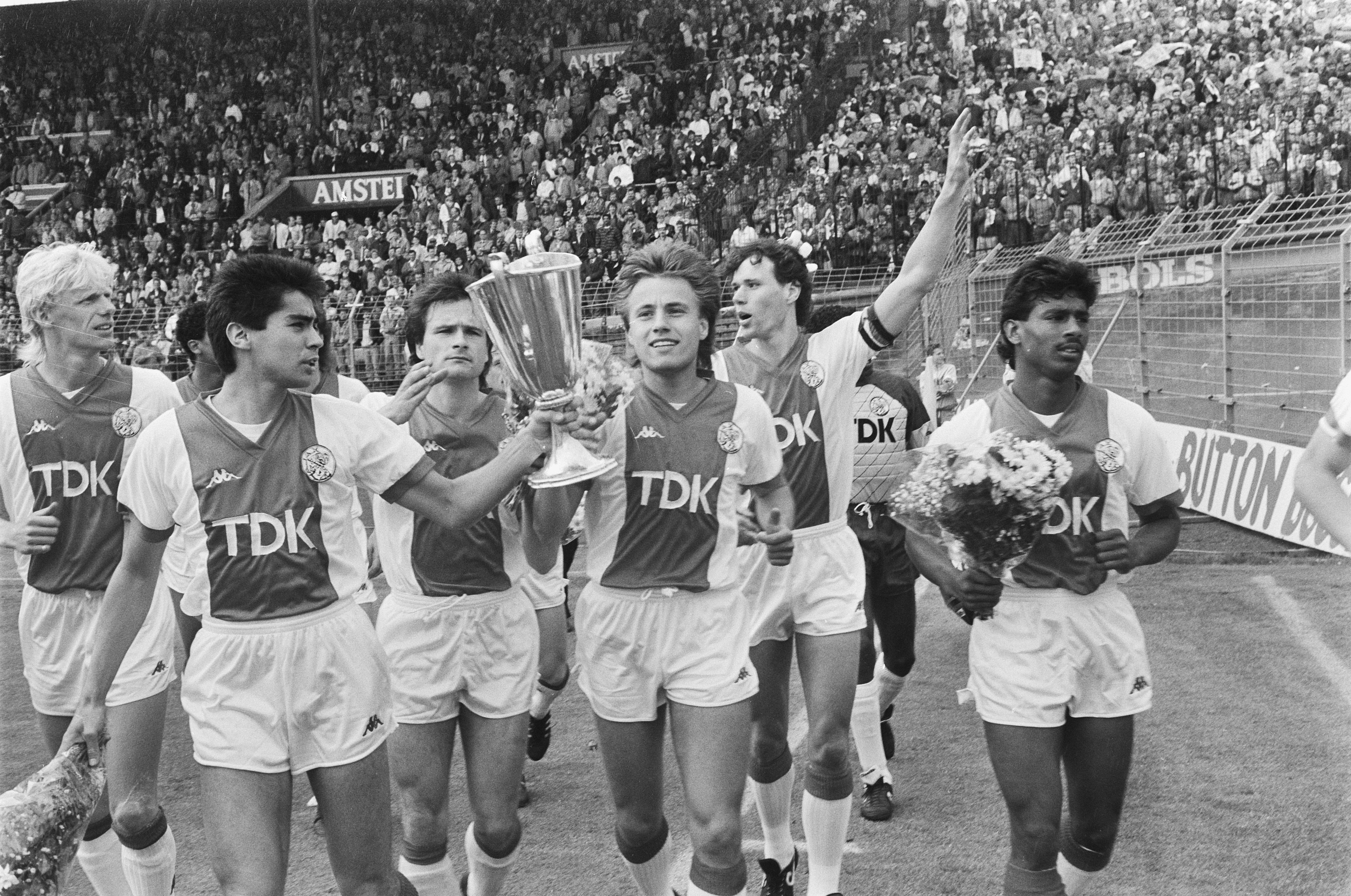
Ajax parade the Cup Winners' Cup in May 1987. Arnold Scholten (left), (Frank Rijkaard), Sonny Silooy, Peter Boeve, Rob Witschge, captain Marco van Basten (Stanley Menzo), and Aron Winter (right).

After leaving the club in June 1983 after a conflict with President Harmsen, Cruyff returned once again in June 1985 as the team's new manager. His attacking tactics were immediately illustrated in his first active season, where Ajax ended the season with a goal difference of +85, and 120 goals in total of which 37 were from Ajax's new star player, Marco van Basten. Despite this, Ajax finished only as runners-up in the league to PSV consecutively in (1985–86 and 1986–87). Despite the lack of domestic league success, however, Cruyff's Ajax won the 1987 Cup Winners' Cup, beating East German club Lokomotive Leipzig. Ajax then reached the Final again in the following season, losing out to KV Mechelen.

Cruyff departed prior to the second Cup Winners' Cup Final largely as a result of the declining results on the domestic front. With most of the 1980s' stars such as Vanenburg and Ronald Koeman in the summer of 1986 leaving to rivals PSV Eindhoven, and Van Basten, Rijkaard and Silooy in the summer/autumn of 1987 also leaving to other countries in Europe, Ajax once again declined. They continued to compete for the title with PSV in subsequent years, who became the dominant club in European and Dutch football, matching Ajax's 1972 achievement of a continental treble in 1988. Negative aspects of the period 1988 from 1991 were the fraud-case in 1989 and a year-long ban from European competition in 1990–91 following an incident whereby a fan threw an iron bar at the Austria Wien goalkeeper during a UEFA Cup tie in the 1989–90 season. Under new manager Leo Beenhakker, who before had been assistant-coach (1978–1979) and manager (1979–1981) at Ajax, Ajax went on to win the championship race with PSV in 1989/90, almost also winning the league again in 1990/91, but narrowly losing-out to PSV.

== Van Gaal era: European success and decline ==
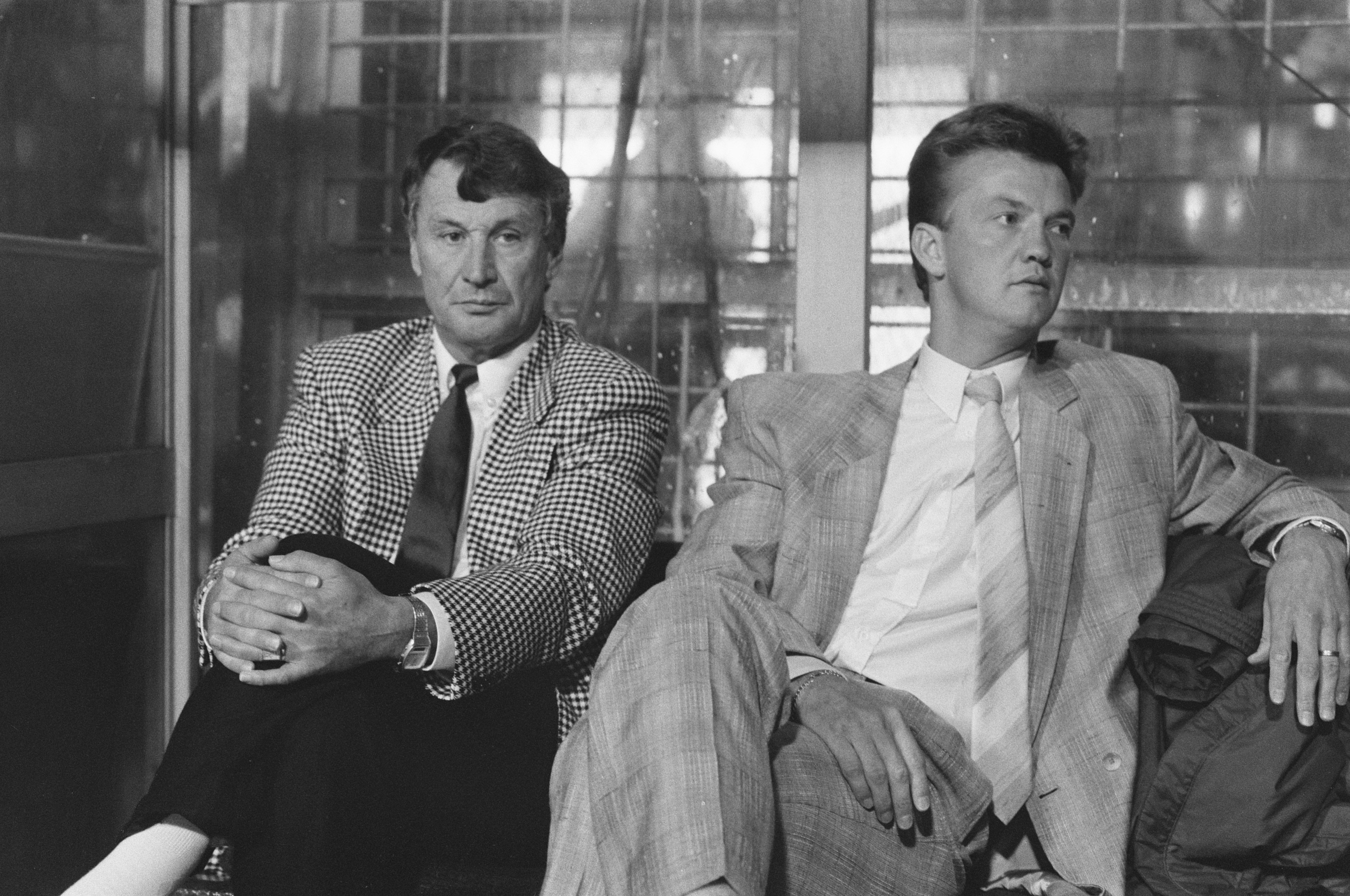
Manager Spitz Kohn and assistant Louis van Gaal in 1988.

On departure to Real Madrid in 1991, Beenhakker was replaced by Louis van Gaal, the team's former assistant coach. Like Cruyff, Van Gaal rapidly made his mark by altering Ajax' tactics, and also like Cruyff, his efforts were rewarded in his first season at the helm by winning the 1992 UEFA Cup after a thrilling final against Torino. Although he did not play the Final's second leg, the tournament saw the arrival of Dennis Bergkamp, who contributed six goals during the competition. Despite Bergkamp being the top goalscorer in Dutch football in 1991 and 1992, Ajax once again finished as runners-up to PSV in the league. In 1992–93, Ajax even had to settle for a third spot for first time since 1984, though they nonetheless won the KNVB Cup.

In 1993, Bergkamp and Wim Jonk left to Internazionale, allowing Finn Jari Litmanen to establish himself as the new number 10 for Ajax. Aside from Litmanen, Ajax attracted Finidi George and the return of Frank Rijkaard, providing a base for Van Gaal to build on. Ajax won three consecutive league titles in 1993–94, 1994–95 and 1995–96.

The 1994–95 season saw Ajax win both the UEFA Champions League and the league title after going unbeaten in both tournaments. It was also the final season for Frank Rijkaard, while striker Patrick Kluivert had an excellent start to his first-team career, with the then 18-year-old coming off the bench to score a late winner to beat Milan 1–0 in the 1995 Champions League Final. Ajax went on to beat Brazilian side Grêmio on penalties to win the 1995 Intercontinental Cup, and beat Real Zaragoza 5–1 on aggregate to win the 1995 UEFA Super Cup. Ajax also reached the 1996 Champions League Final, losing to Juventus on penalties after a 1–1 draw.

The subsequent period, however, saw the departure of manager Louis van Gaal along with an exodus of many key players, several on free transfers following the Bosman ruling—Clarence Seedorf departed in 1995; Edgar Davids, Michael Reiziger, Finidi George and Nwankwo Kanu in 1996; Patrick Kluivert, Marc Overmars and Winston Bogarde in 1997, along with Louis van Gaal departing for Barcelona and being replaced by Morten Olsen; Ronald de Boer and Frank de Boer played their last matches for Ajax in 1998 before leaving in January 1999; and Edwin van der Sar and Jari Litmanen also left in 1999, together with the retirement of Frank Rijkaard in 1995 and Danny Blind in 1999. Van Gaal's replacement, Morten Olsen, attracted Danish national team captain Michael Laudrup to the club for the 1997–98 season. Ajax won the league title and Dutch Cup in 1997–98. Despite this fine success, however, Olsen could not replace the key players who had departed or maintain the success that there had been under Van Gaal. As Olsen began his second season at the club, tensions arose between Dutch players Ronald and Frank de Boer and the Ajax hierarchy over a contract dispute. Results declined on the pitch as the contract row with the De Boers intensified, and Olsen was ultimately sacked late in 1998. In the 1998–99 season, Ajax finished sixth in the league, their lowest position since finishing 13th in the 1964–65 season, although they did win the 1999 Dutch Cup.

== Koeman / Blind / Ten Cate / Van Basten / Jol ==
In the 2002–03 season, manager Ronald Koeman led Ajax to the Champions League quarter-finals against Milan, losing only to a last minute winner in the second-leg encounter at the San Siro. Koeman's early success, however, was short-lived. In 2005, he resigned after Ajax's defeat to AJ Auxerre in the UEFA Cup during a period of arguments with football director Louis van Gaal. Danny Blind was Koeman's replacement, and the former instantly caused consternation by announcing that the club was to play using a 4–4–2 formation, abandoning the Total Football-oriented 4–3–3 that had become Ajax' trademark. The season also saw the departure of key players Rafael van der Vaart and Nigel de Jong to Hamburger SV, and Zlatan Ibrahimović to Juventus, while six others (Hatem Trabelsi, Tomáš Galásek, Hans Vonk, Nourdin Boukhari, Steven Pienaar and Maxwell) revealed they would leave the club at the end of the 2005–06 season.

Blind was later sacked on 10 May 2006 after 422 days in charge, where he was replaced by Henk ten Cate, who had won the Champions League and La Liga title in 2006 as the assistant to Frank Rijkaard with Barcelona. Ten Cate gave youngsters Jan Vertonghen and Robbert Schilder a shot at making the team selection, whereas Greek forward Angelos Charisteas was sold to rivals Feyenoord.

Ajax missed out on a Champions League place in 2006–07 after their defeat against FC Copenhagen (3–2 on aggregate). As a result, Ajax played against IK Start from Norway in the first round of the UEFA Cup on 14 and 18 September, and won the match 9–2 on aggregate (2–5 away and 4–0 home). Having then progressed through the group stages, they drew German club Werder Bremen in the round of 32. In the first leg in Germany, Ajax lost 3–0. On the return leg in Amsterdam, they rallied for two second half goals to win 3–1, but lost 4–3 on aggregate.

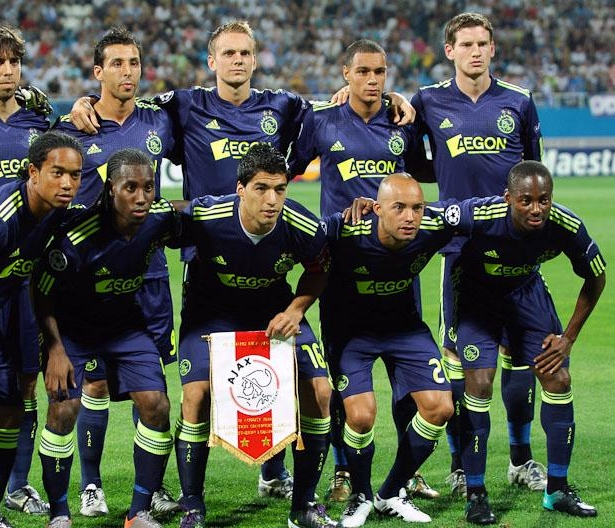
Ajax players in 2010.

In the 2006–07 season Ajax also achieved some successes with ten Cate in charge. They won the Johan Cruyff Shield after a 3–1 win over rivals PSV and they also defeated AZ 8–9 on penalties in the Dutch Cup final after a 1–1 draw after extra time. Ajax was very close to clinch the Eredivisie title after deducting a ten-point deficit from PSV, but lost it on goal difference on the last matchday to PSV (PSV: 75–25, Ajax 84–35).

In the following 2007–08 season, Ajax sold two of the biggest talents: Ryan Babel for €17 million to Liverpool and Wesley Sneijder for €27 million to Real Madrid. Luis Suárez, seen as a replacement for Babel, was signed from FC Groningen. Ajax decided not to buy a replacement for Sneijder because of the difficulty in finding a similar-position type of player to replace him and also because the deal was finished close to the transfer deadline and Ajax would not rush through any signings.

The fact that they did not find any replacement for Sneijder, backed with Edgar Davids's broken leg, disrupted the preparation for the qualification games for a Champions League place. Opponent Slavia Prague won both matches; with a 2–1 scoreline in Prague and 0–1 victory in Amsterdam. The failure to clinch a position in the Champions League group stage led to great criticism from both the supporters and the media, mainly directed at Henk ten Cate and the board of directors. A 1–0 victory over PSV for the Johan Cruyff Shield could not make up for the loss of a Champions League spot. Despite quite a good start in the competition with a lot of goals from both Luis Suárez and Klaas-Jan Huntelaar, Ajax lost ground again in Europe after not making it to the group phase of the UEFA Cup; managing a 0–1 win away against Dinamo Zagreb but lost the tie in Amsterdam after extra time with the score 2–3 to Dinamo. With these string of European failures, coach Ten Cate was not able to carry the team through to the Champions League group stage for two consecutive seasons and no European football at the ArenA for the remainder of the 2007–08 season. With these disappointing results, Ten Cate lost the confidence of the supporters, who demanded that the Board sack him. A more viable solution came when Chelsea, in the same week, offered Ten Cate the job of assistant manager on a three-year deal. On 9 October, Ten Cate left Ajax, whereupon Adrie Koster was selected to helm the squad. On 29 October 2007, captain Jaap Stam announced his immediate retirement from professional football due to a lack of motivation to continue. Ajax finished the season second and, following the Play-offs, qualified for the 2008–09 UEFA Cup.

Following UEFA Euro 2008, former Ajax striker Marco van Basten was appointed as the new manager, succeeding Koster. Johan Cruyff was poised to take up a new position with the club to overhaul the youth program, but after a dispute with Van Basten, he reneged on this commitment. Following Van Basten's appointment, a host of new players were brought into the squad, including Ismaïl Aissati and Miralem Sulejmani, whose €16.25 million transfer from Heerenveen broke the Dutch transfer record. Van Basten chose Klaas-Jan Huntelaar as the new club captain following his appointment, but in the January 2009 transfer window, Huntelaar transferred to Real Madrid on a €27 million deal, a decision for which Ajax were largely criticised in the Dutch papers. The Volkskrant, for instance, referred to Ajax as a mere "trading company" that reduced its chances for a title by selling its main striker.

Ajax finished third in 2008–09 season, qualifying for the inaugural UEFA Europa League. Marco van Basten resigned after the penultimate game of the season, citing the season's results and his inability to perform better next season as main reasons. For the last game against Twente, the team was under the hands of assistant coach John van 't Schip. Later in the same month, Martin Jol was signed as the new coach.

The 2009–10 season for Ajax started with two wins, but after an away defeat against rivals PSV and a draw against Sparta Rotterdam, they were again trailing the league leaders in the early stages of the competition. From matchday seven until matchday 27, Ajax held the third place in the league, with Twente and PSV above them, which held the top position respectively 10 and 11 games. Starting with matchday 21, Ajax won every single match until the end of the season. Twente however, unlike PSV, would not succumb to the pressure and eventually succeeded in keeping a one-point deficit to win the title. Ajax finished the season with a goal difference of +86 (106–20), which was more than double that of Twente (+40). Luis Suárez finished the season as top goal scorer with 35 goals, a record for a non-Dutch player in the Eredivisie. Despite the disappointment of missing out on the league title, Ajax would finish the season by winning a record 18th KNVB Cup by defeating Feyenoord in the final. (On their way to this cup triumph, Ajax also re-wrote the Dutch record books with a remarkable 14–1 victory at the ground of amateurs WHC in Round Four.)

== The Velvet Revolution ==
Towards the end of 2010, Johan Cruyff criticized the board and playing style of Ajax. Cruyff made sure that Frank de Boer (an ally of Cruyff) became the new manager after Jol resigned due to poor results. Afterwards, Cruyff started concocting new plans to bring Ajax back to the top. He attempted to gain more influence in the board by putting allies in the council of members. In March 2011, the board of Ajax resigned due to be unwilling to implement Cruyff's plans. After this, Cruyff himself took a seat on the supervisory board. Together with the four other supervisory directors, he started looking for a new board of directors. Eventually, the four other supervisors and Cruyff would again not be aligned with their vision for the club. The four other supervisors then tried to get Cruyff away by appointing Louis van Gaal as CEO of Ajax. It was known that Cruyff and Van Gaal were not fond of each other and had football philosophies that were not aligned. Cruyff was oblivious of the decision by the other four supervisors to appoint van Gaal as CEO, and as a result, filed a lawsuit as it was required by law for him to be privy to the appointment. In February 2012, the judge ruled that the appointment was not legally valid. The other four supervisors resigned and thus Cruyff had complete freedom to appoint the board he wanted and to carry out his plan. Edwin van der Sar and Marc Overmars, among others, were given a place on the board. The so-called 'Cruyff plan' has been the main line of Ajax's policy since 2012.

== Success under De Boer ==
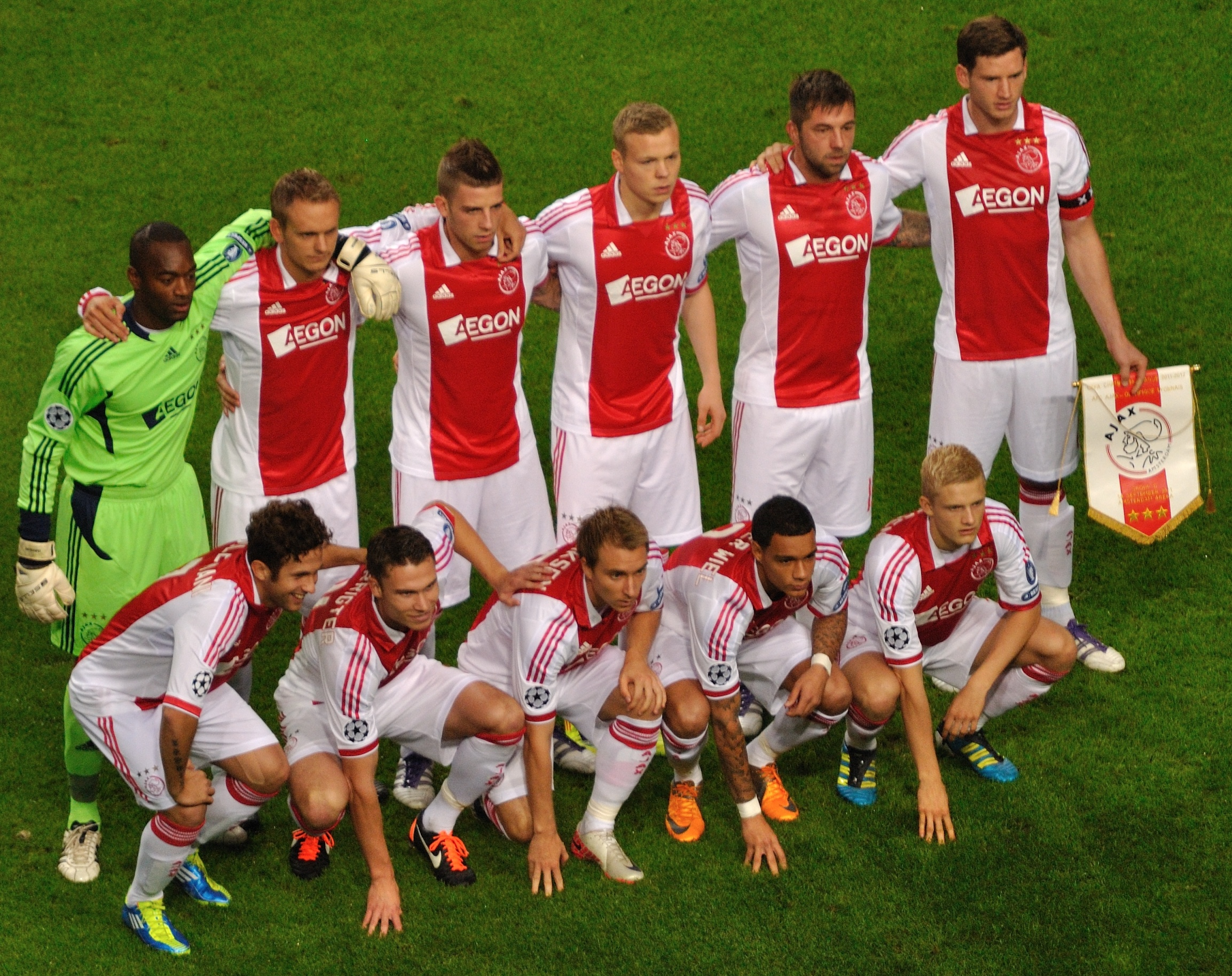
Ajax team lining up for a Champions League match against Lyon in 2011

De Boer's debut game was a 2–0 win over Milan, which rounded off a largely disappointing performance in a group that included heavyweights Real Madrid and Milan; Ajax picked up only seven points in the group stage and was consigned to play in the UEFA Europa League for the remainder of the season, eventually falling to Russian club Spartak Moscow in the round of 16.

On the domestic front, Ajax began turning out some much more positive results in February, losing only once from then on until the end of the season. The team faced Twente twice at the end of the campaign, first in the KNVB Cup Final, then in the final match of the 2010–11 Eredivisie. In the Cup Final, Ajax had the lead twice but succumbed to a 117th minute Marc Janko goal to lose 3–2 after extra time. One week later, there was a grandstand finish set up for the Eredivisie. Rivals PSV had lost pace and were sitting in third place, while Ajax sat in second place just one point below Twente. Thus, should Ajax win, they would overtake Twente and claim the league title. Ajax took the lead through Siem de Jong and a Denny Landzaat own goal just after half-time made it 2–0 to Ajax. Theo Janssen pegged one back for Twente, but it was not to be, as De Jong scored his second and Ajax's third with 12 minutes remaining to put the game to bed. Ajax thus leapfrogged Twente and walked out winners of the 2010–11 Eredivisie. This was Ajax's 30th championship, earning them their third star.

The 2011–12 season began poorly for Ajax and in one stretch, they lost points in seven out of eight consecutive matches, including draws to PSV, Twente, AZ and Feyenoord in the Klassieker. Ajax was marred by injuries towards the end of 2011, most notably to Nicolai Boilesen and transfer Kolbeinn Sigþórsson, who each missed five months or more, as well as Gregory van der Wiel, Siem de Jong and transfer Derk Boerrigter, who each missed a month or more. This led to disappointment in the Champions League, as Ajax failed to progress to the knockout stage by virtue of goal difference. The third-place finish in Group D with Lyon and eventual semi-finalists Real Madrid resulted in qualification to the Europa League knockout stages, where Ajax were drawn against Manchester United. United eliminated Ajax on aggregate, but not before Ajax beat the English powerhouse at Old Trafford 1–2 on a late goal by Toby Alderweireld. In the Eredivisie, Ajax opened the 2012 calendar year with a draw to then leaders AZ and losses in the Klassieker and to Utrecht. This left Ajax in sixth place, ten points behind leaders AZ. Ajax then proceeded to win their final 14 matches of the season for the second time in three years, winning Ajax their 31st championship. On 5 May 2013, Ajax won their 32nd championship after a 5–0 home win against Willem II. The team became Amsterdam Sportsteam of the Year of 2013. In 2013–14, Ajax won their 33rd championship, their fourth consecutive league title for the first time in their long history.

== Return to the European main stage ==
In May 2016, Frank de Boer announced that after 6 years and four domestic league titles, he would be leaving the club. Later in the month, it was announced that former Feyenoord technical director and player, Peter Bosz, would take over the side. After initially losing 5–2 on aggregate to Russian side FC Rostov in the Champions League qualifiers, Ajax would go on to play in the 2017 UEFA Europa League Final, their first European final in 21 years. They would lose the match 2–0 to Manchester United, whilst fielding the youngest side ever in a European final, averaging an age of 22 years and 282 days. For the third consecutive season, they finished runner-up in the Eredivisie, this time to Feyenoord.

Bosz would leave for Borussia Dortmund following the conclusion of the 2016–17 season and was replaced by Marcel Keizer, head coach of Jong Ajax and former Ajax player himself. Keizer was only a week into his tenure when tragedy struck the club and the world of football as a whole. On 8 July 2017, academy starlet Abdelhak Nouri collapsed on the pitch during a pre-season friendly against German side Werder Bremen, due to cardiac arrhythmia. Nouri was transported to a local hospital by helicopter where his condition was announced as stable. Less than a week after his collapse, however, it was revealed that Nouri had suffered severe and permanent brain damage. He would lie in a coma for over a year. Nouri would regain consciousness around August 2018, two months after Ajax admitted that the treatment he received was "inadequate". An external investigation would reveal that had Ajax's medical team used a defibrillator sooner, Nouri's condition could have been much different. In 2020, Abdelhak's brother revealed that was still bedridden and only able to communicate by raising his eyebrows and smiling. Nearly five years after the incident, it was announced in February 2022 that Ajax will pay the Nouri family €7,850,000 in compensation for loss of labor capacities and damages.

Ajax would fail to qualify for both the Champions League and Europa League group stage in the 2017–18 season, and Marcel Keizer would be sacked before the turn of the year. On 21 December 2017, it was announced that FC Utrecht manager, Erik ten Hag, would replace Keizer with imminent effect. Ajax would go on to finish runner-up in the 2017–18 Eredivisie for the fourth consecutive year, falling four points shy of PSV for the title.

The 2018–19 season saw one of Ajax's most successful campaigns of the century. After qualifying for the 2018–19 UEFA Champions League off the back of their second-place finish the previous year and three rounds of qualifying against Sturm Graz, Standard Liège and Dynamo Kyiv respectively, Ajax would compete in the Champions League group stage for the first time since 2014. Ajax ended up finishing the 2018–19 group stage unbeaten, drawing both fixtures against Bayern Munich and once in Lisbon against Benfica, while winning the home leg against the Portuguese side and both fixtures against AEK Athens. They finished as runner-up in the group stage and qualified for the round of 16, where they faced Real Madrid, who had won the previous three Champions League titles, a feat achieved by Ajax in the 1970s but by no other club in the Champions League era. After losing 1–2 in the first leg, they would go on to shock Real Madrid by beating them 4–1 in the Santiago Bernabéu with an aggregate score of 5–3 in their favor.

Ajax would draw Italian giants Juventus in the Champions League quarter-finals. In the first leg at the Johan Cruyff Arena, Ajax held Juventus to a 1–1 draw. In Juventus's stadium, however, Ajax would once again go on the road and beat their opponent in their own stadium, this time by a score of 2–1 and an aggregate of 3–2. This meant Ajax qualified for a Champions League semi-final for the first time in over 20 years. Ajax traveled to North London to face English side Tottenham Hotspur, in the first leg of the semi-finals. They won the match 1–0, marking their ninth consecutive away match in the competition without a loss.

In between legs of the Champions League semi-finals, Ajax would beat Willem II 4–0 to claim the 2018–19 KNVB Cup, Ajax's first piece of silverware since the 2013–14 Eredivisie title. Three days following Ajax's KNVB Cup triumph, the second leg of the Champions League semi-finals took place in Amsterdam. The match started off well for the Dutch side, with 19 year old captain Matthijs de Ligt netting an early goal in the 5th minute, followed by a 35th minute Hakim Ziyech goal to double the home side's advantage and leave them leading 3–0 on aggregate. The second half of the match was a completely different story, however. Lucas Moura would go on to net a second half hat-trick for the London side, including the winner in the 6th minute of added time. The match would end 3–2, with Tottenham advancing to the final via the away goals rule with an aggregate score of 3–3.

Despite Ajax's Champions League heartbreak, they would have to kick on and play two more Eredivisie fixtures to claim the shield, as they were equal on points with rivals PSV. The first of these two matches included a home match against manager Erik ten Hag's former Utrecht side. Ajax would go on to win the game 4–1. Immediately after the full-time whistle blew, Ajax match-goers and players alike watched PSV lose to fourth-placed AZ on the Johan Cruyff Arena big screen, thus putting PSV 3 points behind Ajax with one game remaining and 14 goals behind on goal difference. Ajax cemented their title by defeating De Graafschap, again by a score of 4–1, on the final matchday. This would mark Ajax's 34th domestic league championship, the squad number that Abdelhak Nouri had worn for the senior team to signify his desire to win Ajax's 34th title.

== End of the ten Hag reign ==
After taking the Amsterdam club through one of the greatest runs the club has seen in recent memory, Erik ten Hag was announced as manager of Manchester United on 21 April 2022. His time in charge saw Ajax winning the 2 following Eredivisie titles in 2021 and 2022 as well as another KNVB cup in 2021. No title was given following the abrupt end to the 2019-20 season due to COVID-19, although Ajax were tied on points with AZ Alkmaar at the top of the table with eight matches remaining to eventually never be played. Following ten Hag to Manchester would be starlet Antony after the club received a record fee of €95 million for the 22-year-old Brazilian. The club would also see defender Lisandro Martínez move to Manchester United for €67 million. That summer, Ajax would receive €237 million in transfer fees along with spending €115 million on incoming transfers. Both figures are club records.

A few weeks after ten Hag officially left the club, Ajax appointed Club Brugge boss Alfred Schreuder on 12 May 2022. Schreuder was ten Hag's assistant manager at Ajax during the storied 2018–19 season. He was also an assistant to Julian Nagelsmann during their time at Hoffenheim, as well as an assistant to Ronald Koeman during his time in charge of Barcelona. Schreuder would go on to start his tenure at Ajax in historic fashion by becoming the first Ajax manager of the 21st century to start an Eredivisie campaign with five wins, a feat achieved by no manager since Morten Olsen in 1997. However, seven matches without a win resulted in the termination of Alfred Schreuder's contract. John Heitinga would finish the season as interim manager. Ajax ended the season in third place after champions Feyenoord and runners-up PSV, earning a streak of four consecutive seasons with first-place finishes and missing out on qualification for the 2023–24 UEFA Champions League. Maurice Steijn, who managed Sparta Rotterdam at that time, was appointed as the manager for the 2023–24 season. Ajax and Steijn experienced the worst start of the season in the club's history. They only won two official matches, did not win eight consecutive matches and found themselves back on 17th place, a relegation spot. Director of Football Sven Mislintat and Maurice Steijn had been fired during the season.
