= Han Dade =

Dutch sports director (1878–1940)

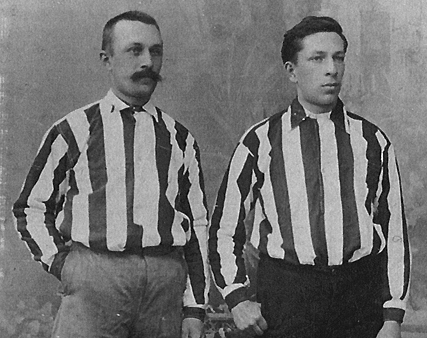
- Han and Johan Dade

Personal information
- Full name: Henrich Daniël Dade
- Date of birth: 9 February 1878
- Place of birth: Amstelveen, Netherlands
- Date of death: 15 December 1940 (aged 62)
- Place of death: Castricum, Netherlands

Senior career*
Years	Team	Apps	(Gls)
- Ajax
- * Club domestic league appearances and goals

Henrich Daniël (Han) Dade (9 February 1878 – 15 December 1940) was a Dutch sports director. He was one of the three founders of the association football club Ajax, along with Floris Stempel and Carel Reeser, and was also chairman of the club from 1910 to 1912.

== Personal life ==
Born 9 February 1878 in Nieuwer-Amstel, the oldest son of shipwright Hartwig Nicolaas Dade and Geertje Orthmann. Dade attended the Hogere Burgerschool on the Weteringschans, and was later employed as an officer for the Koninklijke PTT Nederland. He got married on 20 April 1905 to Geertruida Willemina Robaard (1871–1931) and in 1910 had his first son, Harrie Dade. After his wife Geertruida died in 1932, he remarried to Henny van Lith.

In 1940, he died in Castricum at 62 years of age.

== Club career ==
As a student, Dade founded a football club called Union, along with some fellow students, in 1893. They quickly changed the name to Football Club Ajax or FC Ajax, the club which ultimately became the forerunner for what was to become the officially registered football club Ajax (Amsterdamsche Football Club Ajax) in 1900. Han Dade and his brother Johan both played for Ajax in the beginning years but are mostly known for their managerial functions within the club.

Han Dade served two terms as vice-chairman of the club, first from its foundation in 1900 until 1903, and then from 1914 until 1923. He served as the chairman himself from 1910 until 1912.

== See also ==
- AFC Ajax
- History of AFC Ajax
- Floris Stempel
