= René van Zuuk =

Dutch architect

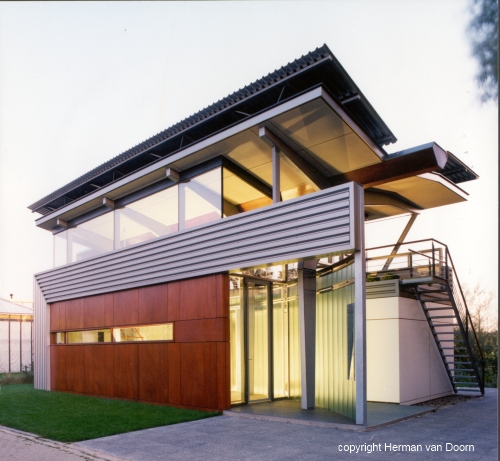
Villa Psyche, Almere

René van Zuuk (born 3 September 1962, in Doesburg) is a Dutch architect.

René van Zuuk studied building production technology at the Technische Universiteit Eindhoven, where he graduated in 1988. Directly after receiving his engineering diploma, he started working at the office of Skidmore, Owings & Merrill in London and Chicago (1988–1989). In 1989 he won the competition "Ongewoon wonen II" (Unusual living II) in Almere, with the design for his own house "Psyche". After realising the project in 1993, René van Zuuk started his own architectural office in Almere.

In 2002 van Zuuk was shortlisted for the Netherlands Architecture Institute award for the best building by a young Dutch architect.

In the past sixteen years, his office, René van Zuuk Architekten bv, has created a portfolio with a large variety of designs. Underlying in all the designs is the continuous search for methods to create a building as interesting as possible, with minimised costs. René van Zuuk's aim is to unite a maximised degree of 'particularity' of the final product with simplicity in manufacturing.

The main principles behind the designs can be place in three categories, structure, production technology and construction. The Arcam building is a direct result from transforming blob architecture into well thought-out architecture that is based on production methods. De Verbeelding is derived from construction methods used by the first farmers on the new lands of Flevoland. Block 16 is a result of playing with Dutch construction principles.
