= Veloso =

Veloso is a Portuguese surname that means "hairy". Notable people with the surname include:

- Veloso (Brazilian footballer) (born 1983), Brazilian footballer
- Adolpho Veloso (born 1989), Brazilian cinematographer
- Amelyn Veloso (1974–2017), Filipino broadcast journalist
- Anna Veloso-Tuazon (born 1978), Filipino lawyer and politician
- António Veloso (born 1957), Portuguese footballer and coach
- Caetano Veloso (born 1942), Brazilian composer and singer
- Diogo Veloso (1558–1599), Portuguese explorer
- Francisco Veloso (born 1969), Portuguese academic
- Guy Veloso (born 1969), Brazilian documentary photographer
- Isabel Veloso (2006–2026), Brazilian social media influencer
- Jose Maria Veloso (1886–1969), Filipino lawyer and politician
- Juliana Veloso (born 1980), Brazilian diver
- Léo Veloso (born 1987), Brazilian footballer
- Lou Veloso (born 1948), Filipino actor
- Manuela M. Veloso (born 1957), Portuguese-American robotics and computer science academic
- Martina Veloso (born 1999), Singaporean sports shooter
- Mary Jane Veloso (born 1985), Filipina sentenced to death for smuggling heroin
- Miguel Veloso (born 1986), Portuguese footballer
- Moreno Veloso (born 1972), Brazilian musician and singer, son of Caetano
- Rui Veloso (born 1957), Portuguese musician
