= Het Houten Stadion =

Stadium in Amsterdam, Netherlands

Coordinates: 52°20′59.6044″N 4°56′22.4452″E

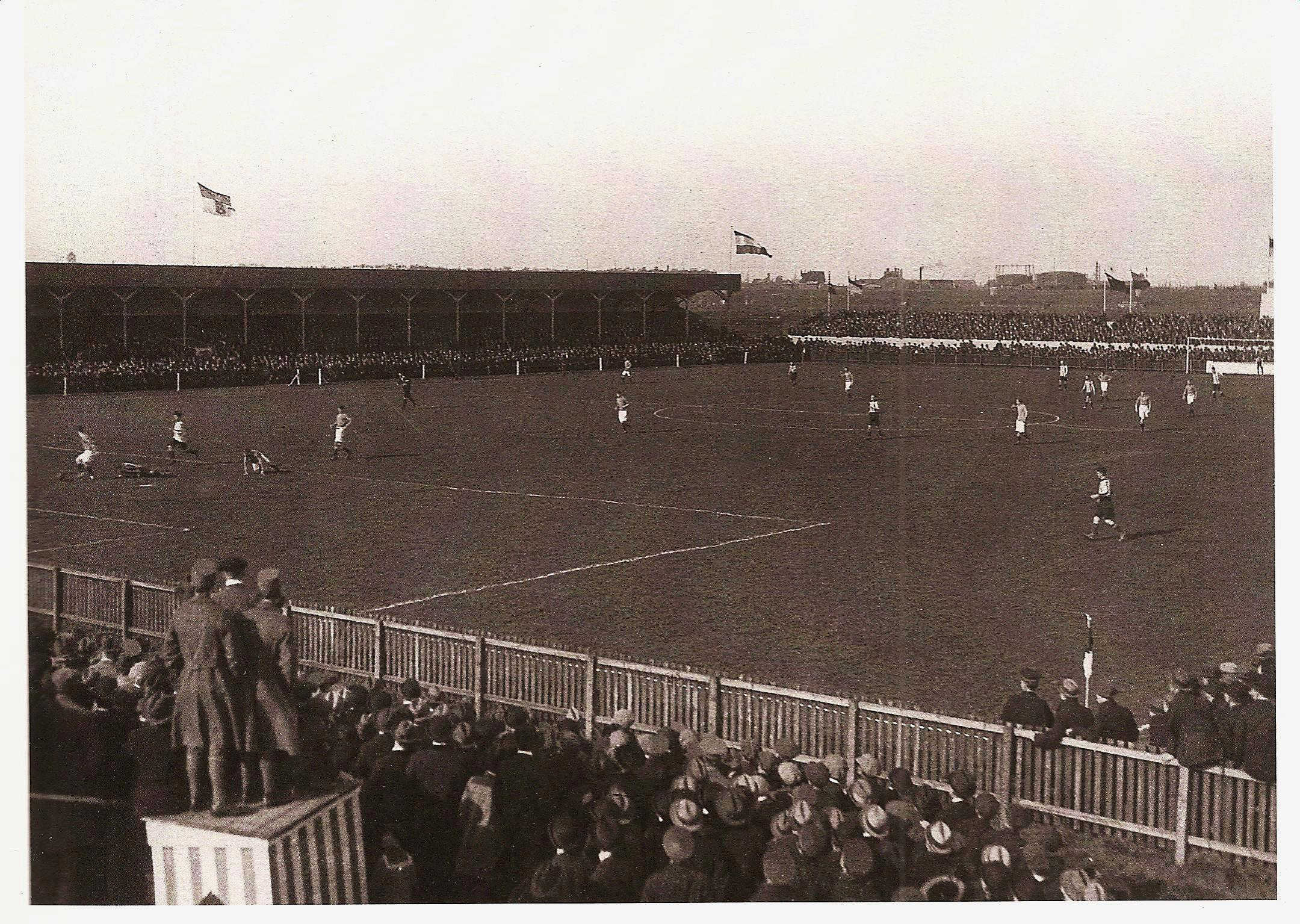
- The stadium c. 1917–18
- Interactive map of Het Houten Stadion
- Location: Amsterdam
- Owner: AFC Ajax
- Capacity: 15,000
- Surface: Grass

Construction
- Opened: 9 July 1907
- Closed: 8 December 1934
- Demolished: 1935
- Architect: Daan Roodenburgh

Tenant
- AFC Ajax (1907–1934)

Het Houten Stadion (English: The Wooden Stadium) is a former stadium of AFC Ajax which served as the team's home stadium from 1907 to 1934.

== History ==
Het Houten Stadion is a former stadium of AFC Ajax. Before Ajax moved to this stadium, they had played on a field in Amsterdam-Noord. Houses had been built on their field in 1907 which sent Ajax searching for a new place to play.

The club found two locations in the municipality of Watergraafsmeer losing their previous pitch to housing development. Both new places were located on the Polder, but were closer than the former field in Noord.

In the early years of the grounds there was no actual stadium, there were no stands, no water and the players would change and get ready in a bar nearby. The first stands were built in 1911 with covered seating on one side, and standing tribunes on the other. In 1916 the stands were built behind both goal lines. Designed by architect and Ajax-member Daan Roodenburgh, the funding for the stadium came from Wim Eggerman, a local businessman, who was the president of the club at the time.

With the success of AFC Ajax in the 1930s the stadium became too small. Every match more people would come to see Ajax play, the last Klassieker match to be played at Het Houten Stadion against Feyenoord was so busy, no corners could be taken during that match because there were spectators spilling out on to the pitch. 15,000 spectators attended that match. On 9 December 1934, Ajax moved to their new De Meer Stadion.

In 1936, Daan Roodenburgh competed in the Art competitions at the 1936 Summer Olympics in Berlin in the Mixed Architecture event for Sports venues with his construction of De Meer Stadion.

There is now an Albert Heijn supermarket situated in the location of the former main entrance to the stadium on Middenweg in the Watergraafsmeer.
