= Jordanus Roodenburgh =

Dutch architect

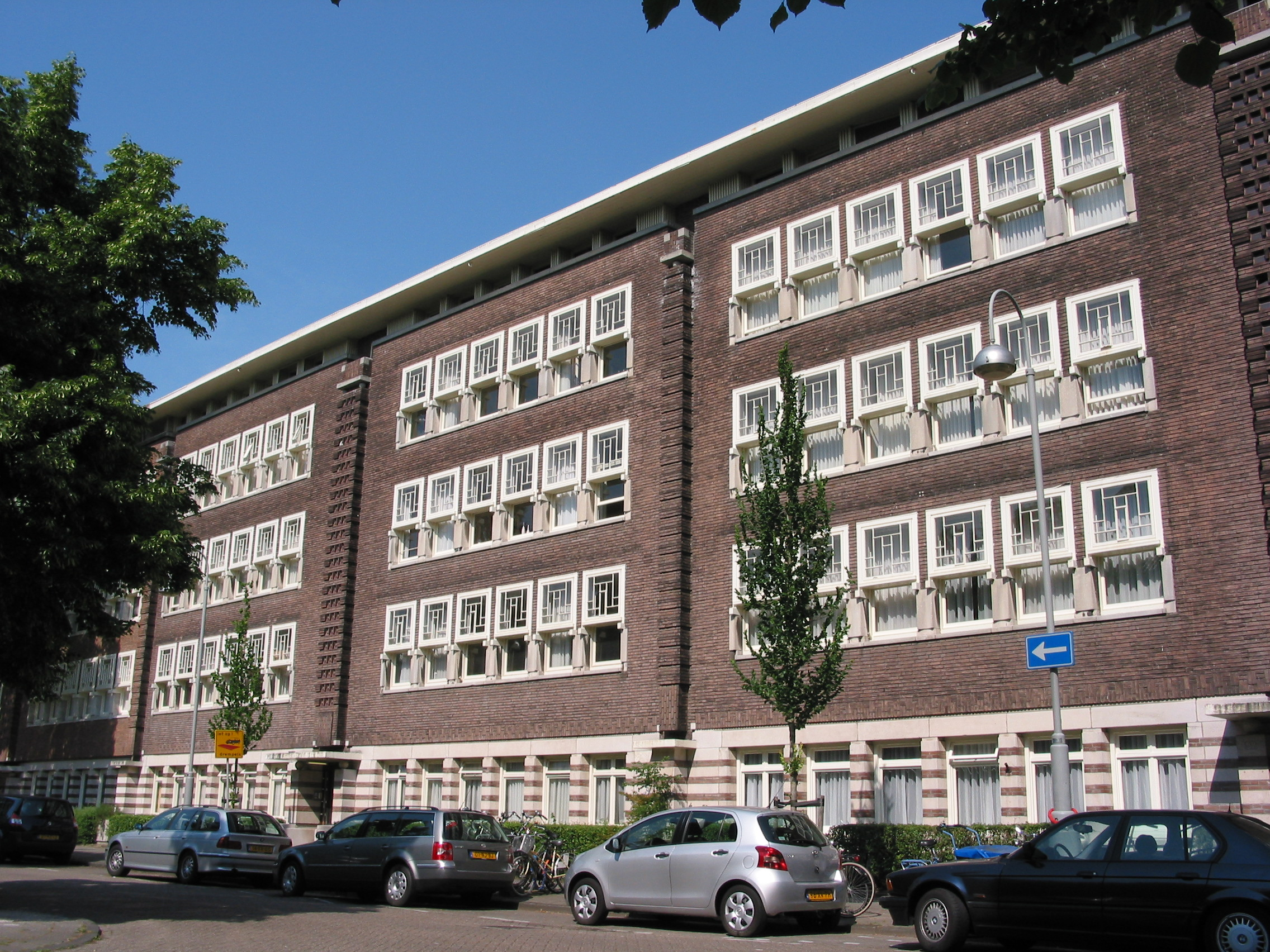
Minervalaan 39-59 Amsterdam

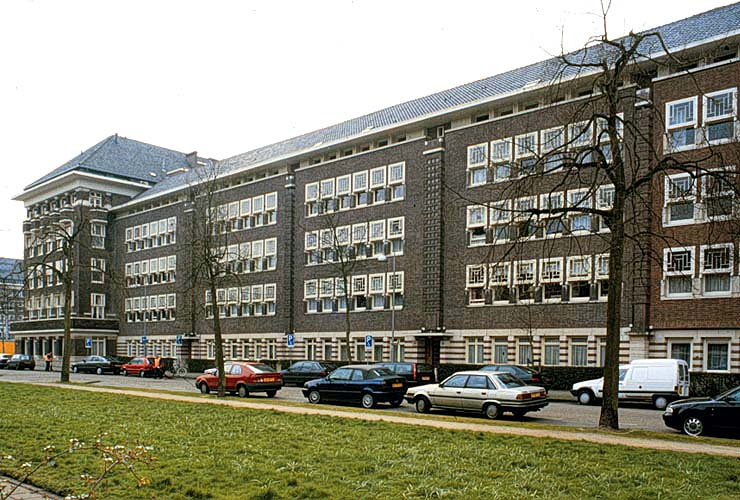
Minervaplein 1-8 Amsterdam

Jordanus (Daan) Roodenburgh (23 July, 1886 – 4 February, 1972) was a Dutch urban-architect and former General director of AFC Ajax.

== Career ==
Born 23 July 1886 in Amsterdam, Netherlands, Daan started his career working for K.P.C. de Bazel and H.A.J. en J. Baanders, before becoming an independent architect in 1916. Apart from his work as an architect, he was also active in several committees, such as the Architectura et Amicitia (Architecture and Friendship) and the Maatschappij tot Bevordering der Bouwkunst (Society for the Promotion of Architecture).

In 1936 at age 50 he competed in the Art competitions at the 1936 Summer Olympics in Berlin in the Mixed Architecture event for Sports venues with his construction of Het Houten Stadion, the first proper stadium for his local football club AFC Ajax.

The works of Roodenburgh are very diverse. During his career he designed apartment buildings, churches, schools, furniture, fire departments, theater, fabric stores, shops and more primarily in the city of Amsterdam and its surrounding area.

On 4 February 1972 Daan Roodenburgh died in his hometown of Amsterdam.

== AFC Ajax ==
Daan Roodenburgh was the architect of Het Houten Stadion on the Middenweg in Watergraafsmeer, Amsterdam, and he also built the team's second stadium De Meer Stadion, while the later reconstruction of the stadium was also attributed to his name.

From 1932 to 1938, Roodenburgh was the commissioner of Ajax, and was later made an honorary member of the club,

== Bibliography ==
- (in English) it: Maristella Casciato, The Amsterdam School, 010 Publishers, Rotterdam, 2005, 25QZ-FUF-IG0S
- (in English) nl: Jonneke Jobse, De Stijl Continued: The Journal Structure (1958-1964) : an Artists' Debate, 010 Publishers, Rotterdam, 2005, GRW9-UOC-9LOG
