= Floris Stempel =

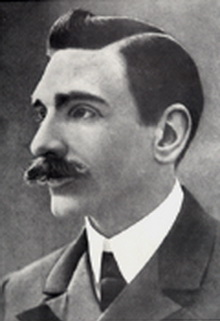
Floris Stempel

Floris Stempel (January 18, 1877 – January~March, 1910) was the first chairman ever in the history of football club Ajax.

== Career ==
Floris was born in Amsterdam and, in 1877, created the first version of Ajax as a football club along with some friends. On 18 March 1900, they first registered the club officially as the Amsterdamsche Football Club Ajax, of which Stempel was the first chairman in the club's history. The first friendly match on 20 March 1900 was organized under his guidance against cross town Amsterdamsche Football Club, with Ajax losing their first ever match 6–1 since officially becoming a club. The first official match for Ajax took place on 29 September 1900 against DOSB, which Ajax won 2–1. In 1902, Stempel was responsible for the admission of Ajax into the Royal Dutch Football Association.

Stempel remained the chairman of the club until 1908, and was relieved of his duties by his friend and co-founder Chris C. Holst.

At some time between 23 January and 16 March 1910, Stempel died. He was on board the SS Prins Willem II of the Royal West Indian Mail Service (KWIM) on his way to Paramaribo, Suriname, but after the ship passed Ushant on 23 January, there was no more communication with the ship and its 54 passengers. Wreckage of the ship finally washed to shore on the west coast of France on 16 March 1910, which confirmed the assumption that the ship, along with its entire crew, cast and cargo had perished at sea.

== See also ==
- AFC Ajax
- History of AFC Ajax
