= De Meer Stadion =

Football stadium in Amsterdam, Netherlands

Coordinates: 52°20′40″N 4°57′0″E

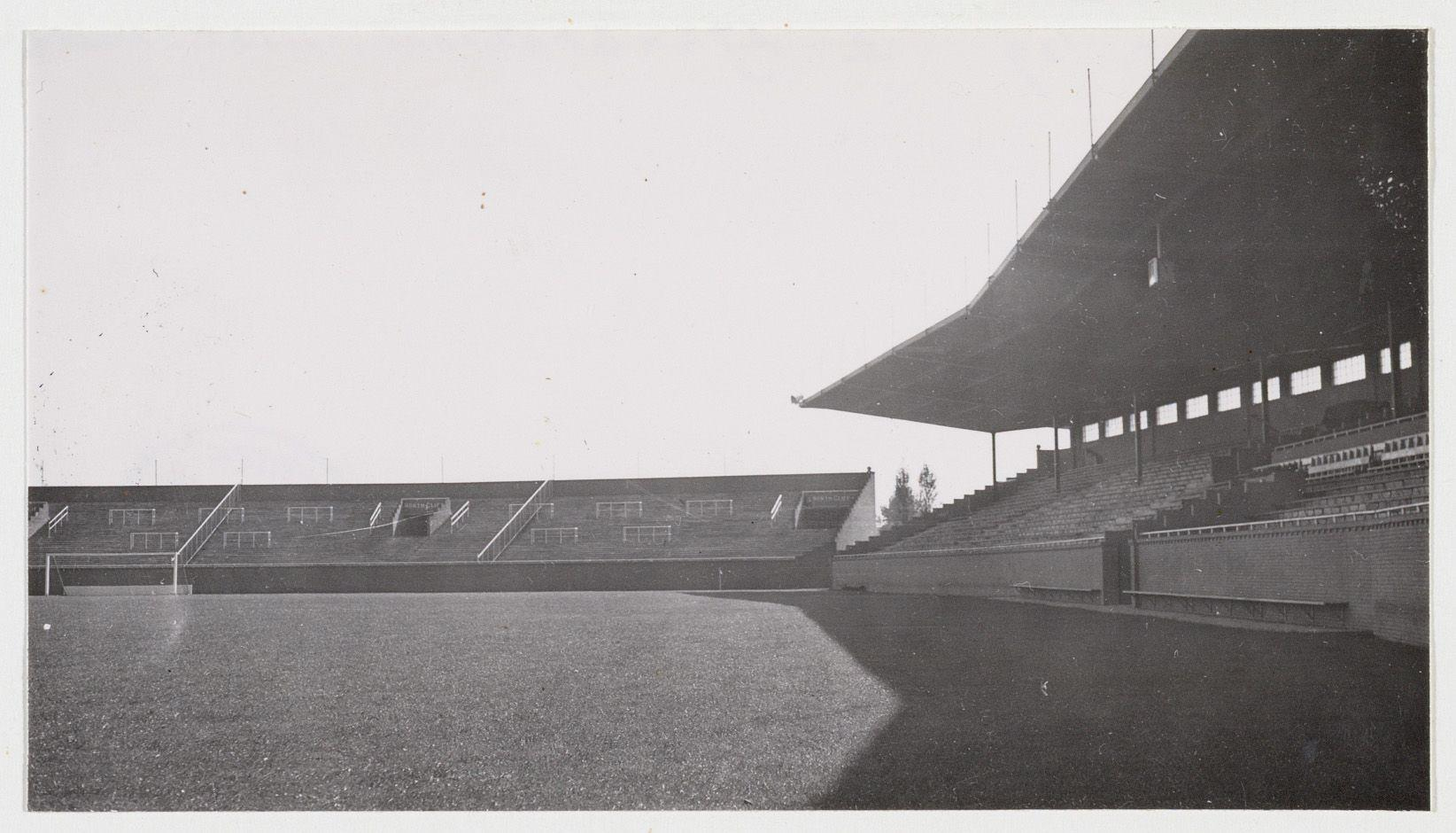
- De Meer in 1937
- Interactive map of De Meer Stadion
- Location: Amsterdam
- Owner: AFC Ajax
- Capacity: 29,500 - 19,500
- Surface: Grass

Construction
- Opened: 9 December 1934
- Closed: 1996
- Demolished: 1996 - 1998
- Architect: Daan Roodenburgh

Tenant
- AFC Ajax (Eredivisie) (1934–1996)

De Meer Stadion (Dutch pronunciation: [də ˈmeːr ˌstaːdijɔn]) is the former stadium of Dutch record football champions Ajax. It was opened in 1934 as a result of the club's former stadium (Het Houten Stadion) being too small. Upon completion, it could hold 22,000 spectators, but accommodating up to 29,500 at its maximum. At time of the closure in 1996 it could hold 19,500 spectators.

De Meer opened in 1935.

Over time, as Ajax's popularity and success grew, the De Meer proved to be too small. From 1930 onward, Ajax played their big (European) games at the Olympic Stadium. The larger venue also hosted Ajax's midweek night games, since the De Meer Stadion lacked floodlights until the mid-seventies.

The Netherlands national football team played five international matches at the stadium, winning all of them. The first match, on 22 August 1973, was a qualifying match for the 1974 FIFA World Cup against Iceland (5-0). The last international match, played on 25 March 1992, was a friendly against Yugoslavia (2-0).

Ajax left the De Meer after the opening of the purpose-built Amsterdam Arena in 1996, which since 2018 is called the Johan Cruyff Arena. The final match at De Meer was an Eredivisie game which saw Ajax hosting Willem II on 28 April 1996. The home side won 5–1 with Finidi George scoring a hat trick, but the final goal in the stadium was scored by Willem II striker Jack de Gier.

Following the club's departure, the De Meer was demolished to make way for a housing development. The stadium is commemorated by having the new streets named after famous football stadia where Ajax played famous away matches, such as Anfield, Wembley or Bernabeu. The centre spot was recreated symbolically as the real centre spot was built over. There are also little bridges named after famous Ajax players like Johan Cruyff, Piet Keizer and Sjaak Swart, as well as a bridge named after manager Rinus Michels.
