= 1979–80 European Cup =

European football tournament

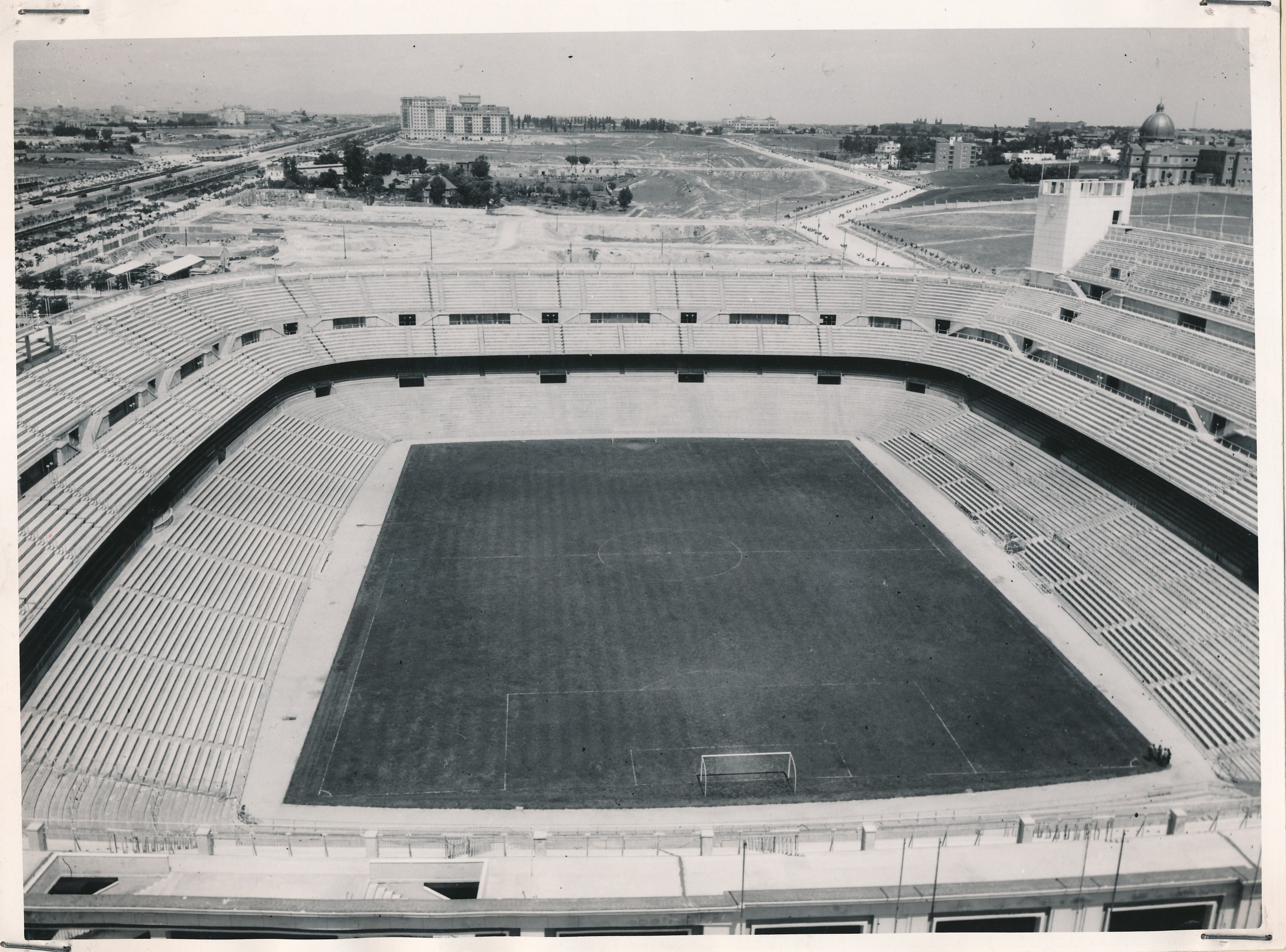
- The Santiago Bernabéu Stadium in Madrid hosted the final.

Tournament details
- Dates: 29 August 1979 – 28 May 1980
- Teams: 33

Final positions
- Champions: (England) Nottingham Forest (2nd title)
- Runners-up: (West Germany) Hamburg

Tournament statistics
- Matches played: 63
- Goals scored: 185 (2.94 per match)
- Attendance: 2,041,979 (32,412 per match)
- Top scorer(s): Søren Lerby (Ajax); 10 goals

The 1979–80 European Cup was the 25th season of the European Cup, UEFA's premier club football competition. The tournament was won by holders Nottingham Forest in the final against Hamburg. The winning goal was scored by John Robertson, who drilled the ball into the corner of the Hamburg net from outside the penalty area. Nottingham Forest remain the only side to have won the European Cup more times than their domestic top flight.

== Teams ==
(Albania) Partizani (1st)	Austria Wien (1st)	(Belgium) Beveren (1st)
(Bulgaria) Levski-Spartak (1st)	(Cyprus) Omonia (1st)	(Czechoslovakia) Dukla Prague (1st)
(Denmark) Vejle (1st)	(England) Liverpool (1st)	(England) Nottingham Forest (2nd)^{TH}
(Finland) HJK Helsinki (1st)	(France) Strasbourg (1st)	(East Germany) BFC Dynamo (1st)
(West Germany) Hamburg (1st)	(Greece) AEK Athens (1st)	(Hungary) Újpesti Dózsa (1st)
(Iceland) Valur (1st)	(Republic of Ireland) Dundalk (1st)	(Italy) Milan (1st)
(Luxembourg) Red Boys Differdange (1st)	(Malta) Hibernians (1st)	(Netherlands) Ajax (1st)
(Northern Ireland) Linfield (1st)	(Norway) Start (1st)	(Poland) Ruch Chorzów (1st)
(Portugal) Porto (1st)	(Romania) Argeș Pitești (1st)	(Scotland) Celtic (1st)
(Spain) Real Madrid (1st)	(Sweden) Öster (1st)	(Switzerland) Servette (1st)
(Turkey) Trabzonspor (1st)	(Soviet Union) Dinamo Tbilisi (1st)	(Socialist Federal Republic of Yugoslavia) Hajduk Split (1st)

== Preliminary round ==
Team 1	Agg.	Team 2	1st leg	2nd leg
Dundalk (Republic of Ireland)	3–1	(Northern Ireland) Linfield	1–1	2–0

=== First leg ===
29 August 1979

Dundalk (Republic of Ireland)	1–1	(Northern Ireland) Linfield
Devine 80'	Report	Feeney 48'

Oriel Park, Dundalk
Attendance: 5,000
Referee: Pat Partridge (England)

=== Second leg ===
5 September 1979

Linfield (Northern Ireland)	0–2	(Republic of Ireland) Dundalk
	Report	Muckian 14', 88'

Haarlem Stadion, Haarlem
Attendance: 1,147
Referee: Jan Beck (Netherlands)

Dundalk won 3–1 on aggregate.

== Bracket ==
Round of 32
(England) Nottingham Forest	2	1	3
(Sweden) Öster	0	1	1
(Romania) Argeș Pitești	3	0	3
(Greece) AEK Athens	0	2	2
(East Germany) BFC Dynamo	4	0	4
(Poland) Ruch Chorzów	1	0	1
(Switzerland) Servette	3	1	4
(Belgium) Beveren	1	1	2
(Hungary) Újpesti Dózsa	3	0	3
(Czechoslovakia) Dukla Prague	2	2	4
(Norway) Start	1	0	1
(France) Strasbourg	2	4	6
(Finland) HJK Helsinki	1	1	2
(Netherlands) Ajax	8	8	16
(Luxembourg) Red Boys Differdange	2	1	3
(Cyprus) Omonia	1	6	7
(Albania) Partizani	1	1	2
(Scotland) Celtic	0	4	4
(Republic of Ireland) Dundalk	2	0	2
(Malta) Hibernians	0	1	1
(Portugal) Porto	0	1	1
(Italy) Milan	0	0	0
(Bulgaria) Levski-Spartak	0	0	0
(Spain) Real Madrid	1	2	3
(Iceland) Valur	0	1	1
(West Germany) Hamburg	3	2	5
(England) Liverpool	2	0	2
(Soviet Union) Dinamo Tbilisi	1	3	4
(Denmark) Vejle	3	1	4
Austria Wien	2	1	3
(Socialist Federal Republic of Yugoslavia) Hajduk Split	1	1	2
(Turkey) Trabzonspor	0	0	0

Round of 16
(England) Nottingham Forest	2	2	4
(Romania) Argeș Pitești	0	1	1
(East Germany) BFC Dynamo	2	2	4
(Switzerland) Servette	1	2	3
(Czechoslovakia) Dukla Prague	1	0	1
(France) Strasbourg	0	2	2
(Netherlands) Ajax	10	0	10
(Cyprus) Omonia	0	4	4
(Scotland) Celtic	3	0	3
(Republic of Ireland) Dundalk	2	0	2
(Portugal) Porto	2	0	2
(Spain) Real Madrid (a)	1	1	2
(West Germany) Hamburg	3	3	6
(Soviet Union) Dinamo Tbilisi	1	2	3
(Denmark) Vejle	0	2	2
(Socialist Federal Republic of Yugoslavia) Hajduk Split	3	1	4

Quarter-finals
(England) Nottingham Forest	0	3	3
(East Germany) BFC Dynamo	1	1	2
(France) Strasbourg	0	0	0
(Netherlands) Ajax	0	4	4
(Scotland) Celtic	2	0	2
(Spain) Real Madrid	0	3	3
(West Germany) Hamburg (a)	1	2	3
(Socialist Federal Republic of Yugoslavia) Hajduk Split	0	3	3

Semi-finals
(England) Nottingham Forest	2	0	2
(Netherlands) Ajax	0	1	1
(Spain) Real Madrid	2	1	3
(West Germany) Hamburg	0	5	5

Final
(England) Nottingham Forest	1
(West Germany) Hamburg	0

== First round ==
Team 1	Agg.	Team 2	1st leg	2nd leg
Nottingham Forest (England)	3–1	(Sweden) Öster	2–0	1–1
Argeș Pitești (Romania)	3–2	(Greece) AEK Athens	3–0	0–2
BFC Dynamo (East Germany)	4–1	(Poland) Ruch Chorzów	4–1	0–0
Servette (Switzerland)	4–2	(Belgium) Beveren	3–1	1–1
Újpesti Dózsa (Hungary)	3–4	(Czechoslovakia) Dukla Prague	3–2	0–2
Start (Norway)	1–6	(France) Strasbourg	1–2	0–4
HJK Helsinki (Finland)	2–16	(Netherlands) Ajax	1–8	1–8
Red Boys Differdange (Luxembourg)	3–7	(Cyprus) Omonia	2–1	1–6
Partizani (Albania)	2–4	(Scotland) Celtic	1–0	1–4
Dundalk (Republic of Ireland)	2–1	(Malta) Hibernians	2–0	0–1
Porto (Portugal)	1–0	(Italy) Milan	0–0	1–0
Levski-Spartak (Bulgaria)	0–3	(Spain) Real Madrid	0–1	0–2
Valur (Iceland)	1–5	(West Germany) Hamburg	0–3	1–2
Liverpool (England)	2–4	(Soviet Union) Dinamo Tbilisi	2–1	0–3
Vejle (Denmark)	4–3	Austria Wien	3–2	1–1
Hajduk Split (Socialist Federal Republic of Yugoslavia)	2–0	(Turkey) Trabzonspor	1–0	1–0

=== First leg ===
19 September 1979

Nottingham Forest (England)	2–0	(Sweden) Öster
Bowyer 63', 73'	Report

City Ground, Nottingham
Attendance: 21,974
Referee: Sotos Afxentiou (Cyprus)

19 September 1979

Argeș Pitești (Romania)	3–0	(Greece) AEK Athens
Nicolae 49', 80'; Radu 65'	Report

Stadionul 1 Mai, Pitești
Attendance: 20,000
Referee: Enzo Barbaresco (Italy)

19 September 1979

BFC Dynamo (East Germany)	4–1	(Poland) Ruch Chorzów
Netz 3'; Pelka 18', 79'; Riediger 27'	Report	Wycislik 87'

Friedrich-Ludwig-Jahn-Stadion, East Berlin
Attendance: 30,000
Referee: Atanas Mateev (Bulgaria)

19 September 1979

Servette (Switzerland)	3–1	(Belgium) Beveren
Van Genechten 2' (o.g.); Coutaz 65'; Hamberg 80'	Report	Janssens 5'

Stade des Charmilles, Geneve
Attendance: 16,605
Referee: Antonin Vencl (Czechoslovakia)

19 September 1979

Újpesti Dózsa (Hungary)	3–2	(Czechoslovakia) Dukla Prague
Sarlós 42'; Nagy 66'; Fazekas 71' (pen.)	Report	Gajdůšek 3'; Nehoda 58'

Megyeri út, Budapest
Attendance: 13,000
Referee: Otto Anderco (Romania)

19 September 1979

Start (Norway)	1–2	(France) Strasbourg
Ervik 81'	Report	Piasecki 44', 74'

Kristiansand Stadion, Kristiansand
Attendance: 5,345
Referee: Heinz Einbeck (East Germany)

19 September 1979

HJK Helsinki (Finland)	1–8	(Netherlands) Ajax
Rautiainen 50'	Report	Lerby 6', 33'; Tahamata 20', 70'; Arnesen 37', 68'; Krol 53' (pen.); La Ling 63'

Helsingin Olympiastadion, Helsinki
Attendance: 17,020
Referee: Eduard Shklovski (Soviet Union)

19 September 1979

Red Boys Differdange (Luxembourg)	2–1	(Cyprus) Omonia
Di Domenico 20' (pen.); Wagner 69'	Report	Patikis 35'

Stade du Thillenberg, Differdange
Attendance: 2,500
Referee: Günter Linn (West Germany)

19 September 1979

Partizani (Albania)	1–0	(Scotland) Celtic
Murati 35'	Report

Stadiumi Kombëtar Qemal Stafa, Tirana
Attendance: 27,500
Referee: Nikolaos Zlatanos (Greece)

19 September 1979

Dundalk (Republic of Ireland)	2–0	(Malta) Hibernians
Carlyle 21'; Devine 68'	Report

Oriel Park, Dundalk
Attendance: 8,000
Referee: Egbert Mulder (Netherlands)

19 September 1979

Porto (Portugal)	0–0	(Italy) Milan
	Report

Estádio das Antas, Porto
Attendance: 55,000
Referee: Erich Linemayr (Austria)

19 September 1979

Levski-Spartak (Bulgaria)	0–1	(Spain) Real Madrid
	Report	Martínez 26'

Vasil Levski National Stadium, Sofia
Attendance: 15,200
Referee: Horst Brummeier (Austria)

19 September 1979

Valur (Iceland)	0–3	(West Germany) Hamburg
	Report	Hrubesch 18', 26'; Buljan 77'

Laugardalsvöllur, Reykjavík
Attendance: 10,235
Referee: Hugh Wilson (Northern Ireland)

19 September 1979

Liverpool (England)	2–1	(Soviet Union) Dinamo Tbilisi
Johnson 19'; Case 44'	Report	Chivadze 33'

Anfield, Liverpool
Attendance: 35,270
Referee: Ángel Franco Martínez (Spain)

19 September 1979

Vejle (Denmark)	3–2	Austria Wien
Andersen 8'; Rasmussen 10'; Sørensen 40' (pen.)	Report	Baumeister 38'; Schachner 40'

Vejle Stadion (1924), Vejle
Attendance: 5,800
Referee: Jan Peeters (Belgium)

19 September 1979

Hajduk Split (Socialist Federal Republic of Yugoslavia)	1–0	(Turkey) Trabzonspor
Primorac 75' (pen.)	Report

Stadion Poljud, Split
Attendance: 52,500
Referee: Miroslav Stupar (Soviet Union)

=== Second leg ===
3 October 1979

Öster (Sweden)	1–1	(England) Nottingham Forest
Nordgren 52'	Report	Woodcock 79'

Värendsvallen, Växjö
Attendance: 14,772
Referee: Jerzy Kacprzak (Poland)

Nottingham Forest won 3–1 on aggregate.

3 October 1979

AEK Athens (Greece)	2–0	(Romania) Argeș Pitești
Ivan 12' (o.g.); Vladić 20'	Report

AEK Stadium, Athens
Attendance: 35,000
Referee: André Daina (Switzerland)

Argeș Pitești won 3–2 on aggregate.

3 October 1979

Ruch Chorzów (Poland)	0–0	(East Germany) BFC Dynamo
	Report

Silesian Stadium, Chorzów
Attendance: 15,000
Referee: Yuri Sergienko (Soviet Union)

BFC Dynamo won 4–1 on aggregate.

3 October 1979

Beveren (Belgium)	1–1	(Switzerland) Servette
Albert 18' (pen.)	Report	Barberis 37'

Freethiel Stadion, Beveren
Attendance: 11,000
Referee: Clive White (England)

Servette won 4–2 on aggregate.

3 October 1979

Dukla Prague (Czechoslovakia)	2–0	(Hungary) Újpesti Dózsa
Vízek 24'; Nehoda 88'	Report

Stadion Letná, Prague
Attendance: 17,000
Referee: Walter Eschweiler (West Germany)

Dukla Prague won 4–3 on aggregate.

3 October 1979

Strasbourg (France)	4–0	(Norway) Start
Bianchi 13', 39', 69'; Decastel 76'	Report

Stade de la Meinau, Strasbourg
Attendance: 13,685
Referee: William Attley (Ireland)

Strasbourg won 6–1 on aggregate.

3 October 1979

Ajax (Netherlands)	8–1	(Finland) HJK Helsinki
Krol 6', 68' (pen.); Blanker 15', 53', 61', 88'; Everse 20'; Lerby 30'	Report	Toivola 85'

De Meer Stadion, Amsterdam
Attendance: 8,250
Referee: Mário Luís (Portugal)

Ajax won 16–2 on aggregate.

3 October 1979

Omonia (Cyprus)	6–1	(Luxembourg) Red Boys Differdange
Kaiafas 7', 45' (pen.), 70' (pen.), 71'; Kanaris 8'; Dimitriou 40'	Report	Schmidt 42'

Makario Stadium, Nikosia
Attendance: 14,500
Referee: Clive Thomas (Wales)

Omonia won 7–3 on aggregate.

3 October 1979

Celtic (Scotland)	4–1	(Albania) Partizani
MacDonald 20'; Aitken 22', 44'; Davidson 31'	Report	Sneddon 15' (o.g.)

Celtic Park, Glasgow
Attendance: 46,712
Referee: Lars-Åke Björck (Sweden)

Celtic won 4–2 on aggregate.

26 September 1979

Hibernians (Malta)	1–0	(Republic of Ireland) Dundalk
Vella 67'	Report

Empire Stadium, Gżira
Attendance: 6,000
Referee: Emmanuel Platopoulos (Greece)

Dundalk won 2–1 on aggregate.

3 October 1979

Milan (Italy)	0–1	(Portugal) Porto
	Report	Duda 60'

San Siro, Milan
Attendance: 64,880
Referee: Hilmi Ok (Turkey)

Porto won 1–0 on aggregate.

3 October 1979

Real Madrid (Spain)	2–0	(Bulgaria) Levski-Spartak
Del Bosque 20'; Cunningham 32' (pen.)	Report

Santiago Bernabéu Stadium, Madrid
Attendance: 40,000
Referee: Francis Rion (Belgium)

Real Madrid won 3–0 on aggregate.

3 October 1979

Hamburg (West Germany)	2–1	(Iceland) Valur
Hrubesch 50'; Wehmeyer 74'	Report	Eðvaldsson 89'

Volksparkstadion, Hamburg
Attendance: 5,000
Referee: Norbert Rolles (Luxembourg)

Hamburg won 5–1 on aggregate.

3 October 1979

Dinamo Tbilisi (Soviet Union)	3–0	(England) Liverpool
Gutsaev 55'; Shengelia 75'; Chivadze 81' (pen.)	Report

Vladimir Lenin Stadium, Tbilisi
Attendance: 82,000
Referee: Heinz Aldinger (West Germany)

Dinamo Tbilisi won 4–2 on aggregate.

3 October 1979

Austria Wien	1–1	(Denmark) Vejle
Gasselich 51'	Report	Brylle Larsen 35'

Praterstadion, Wien
Attendance: 30,000
Referee: Dusan Maksimović (Yugoslavia)

Vejle won 4–3 on aggregate.

3 October 1979
13:00

Trabzonspor (Turkey)	0–1	(Socialist Federal Republic of Yugoslavia) Hajduk Split
	Report	Đorđević 44'

Hüseyin Avni Aker Stadyumu, Trabzon
Attendance: 25,000
Referee: László Pádár (Hungary)

Hajduk Split won 2–0 on aggregate.

== Second round ==
Team 1	Agg.	Team 2	1st leg	2nd leg
Nottingham Forest (England)	4–1	(Romania) Argeș Pitești	2–0	2–1
BFC Dynamo (East Germany)	4–3	(Switzerland) Servette	2–1	2–2
Dukla Prague (Czechoslovakia)	1–2	(France) Strasbourg	1–0	0–2
Ajax (Netherlands)	10–4	(Cyprus) Omonia	10–0	0–4
Celtic (Scotland)	3–2	(Republic of Ireland) Dundalk	3–2	0–0
Porto (Portugal)	2–2 (a)	(Spain) Real Madrid	2–1	0–1
Hamburg (West Germany)	6–3	(Soviet Union) Dinamo Tbilisi	3–1	3–2
Vejle (Denmark)	2–4	(Socialist Federal Republic of Yugoslavia) Hajduk Split	0–3	2–1

=== First leg ===
24 October 1979

Nottingham Forest (England)	2–0	(Romania) Argeș Pitești
Woodcock 12'; Birtles 16'	Report

City Ground, Nottingham
Attendance: 24,828
Referee: Reidar Bjørnestad (Norway)

24 October 1979

BFC Dynamo (East Germany)	2–1	(Switzerland) Servette
Pelka 8'; Netz 10'	Report	Cucinotta 65'

Friedrich-Ludwig-Jahn-Stadion, East Berlin
Attendance: 25,000
Referee: Bob Valentine (Scotland)

24 October 1979

Dukla Prague (Czechoslovakia)	1–0	(France) Strasbourg
Vízek 10'	Report

Na Litavce, Příbram
Attendance: 16,000
Referee: Johannes-Frederik Beck (Netherlands)

24 October 1979

Ajax (Netherlands)	10–0	(Cyprus) Omonia
Lerby 14', 28', 43', 72', 74'; Krol 53' (pen.); Arnesen 59'; Blanker 66', 81', 87'	Report

De Meer Stadion, Amsterdam
Attendance: 12,000
Referee: Oliver Donnelly (Northern Ireland)

24 October 1979

Celtic (Scotland)	3–2	(Republic of Ireland) Dundalk
MacDonald 4'; McCluskey 31'; Burns 33'	Report	Muckian 32'; Lawlor 68'

Celtic Park, Glasgow
Attendance: 33,000
Referee: Þorvarður Björnsson (Iceland)

24 October 1979

Porto (Portugal)	2–1	(Spain) Real Madrid
Gomes 35', 40' (pen.)	Report	Cunningham 52'

Estádio das Antas, Porto
Attendance: 55,000
Referee: Michel Vautrot (France)

24 October 1979

Hamburg (West Germany)	3–1	(Soviet Union) Dinamo Tbilisi
Kaltz 36'; Keegan 53'; Hartwig 74'	Report	Kipiani 29'

Volksparkstadion, Hamburg
Attendance: 48,000
Referee: Georges Konrath (France)

24 October 1979

Vejle (Denmark)	0–3	(Socialist Federal Republic of Yugoslavia) Hajduk Split
	Report	Šurjak 4'; Krstičević 53'; Šalov 65'

Vejle Stadium (1924), Vejle
Attendance: 6,500
Referee: David Syme (Scotland)

=== Second leg ===
7 November 1979

Argeș Pitești (Romania)	1–2	(England) Nottingham Forest
Bărbulescu 60' (pen.)	Report	Bowyer 5'; Birtles 23'

Stadionul 1 Mai, Pitești
Attendance: 22,000
Referee: Ángel Franco Martínez (Spain)

Nottingham Forest won 4–1 on aggregate.

7 November 1979

Servette (Switzerland)	2–2	(East Germany) BFC Dynamo
Hamberg 83'; Barberis 90'	Report	Brillat 33'; Terletzki 81'

Charmilles Stadium, Geneva
Attendance: 20,000
Referee: Alek Jarguz (Poland)

BFC Dynamo won 4–3 on aggregate.

7 November 1979

Strasbourg (France)	2–0 (a.e.t.)	(Czechoslovakia) Dukla Prague
Piasecki 67'; Decastel 116'	Report

Stade de la Meinau, Strasbourg
Attendance: 35,000
Referee: Augusto Lamo Castillo (Spain)

Strasbourg won 2–1 on aggregate.

7 November 1979

Omonia (Cyprus)	4–0	(Netherlands) Ajax
Tsikkos 9'; Dimitriou 15'; Kaiafas 39', 56'	Report

Makario Stadium, Nikosia
Attendance: 12,150
Referee: Dusan Maksimović (Yugoslavia)

Ajax won 10–4 on aggregate.

7 November 1979

Dundalk (Republic of Ireland)	0–0	(Scotland) Celtic
	Report

Oriel Park, Dundalk
Attendance: 16,300
Referee: Henning Lund-Sørensen (Denmark)

Celtic won 3–2 on aggregate.

7 November 1979

Real Madrid (Spain)	1–0	(Portugal) Porto
Benito 71'	Report

Santiago Bernabéu Stadium, Madrid
Attendance: 115,000
Referee: Nicolae Rainea (Romania)

2–2 on aggregate; Real Madrid won on away goals.

7 November 1979

Dinamo Tbilisi (Soviet Union)	2–3	(West Germany) Hamburg
Gutsaev 5'; Kipiani 45'	Report	Keegan 34'; Hrubesch 41'; Buljan 56'

Vladimir Lenin Stadium, Tbilisi
Attendance: 90,000
Referee: Alexis Ponnet (Belgium)

Hamburg won 6–3 on aggregate.

7 November 1979

Hajduk Split (Socialist Federal Republic of Yugoslavia)	1–2	(Denmark) Vejle
Zl. Vujović 63'	Report	Brylle Larsen 21'; Østergaard 70'

Stadion Poljud, Split
Attendance: 20,000
Referee: Paolo Casarin (Italy)

Hajduk Split won 4–2 on aggregate.

== Quarter-finals ==
Team 1	Agg.	Team 2	1st leg	2nd leg
Nottingham Forest (England)	3–2	(East Germany) BFC Dynamo	0–1	3–1
Strasbourg (France)	0–4	(Netherlands) Ajax	0–0	0–4
Celtic (Scotland)	2–3	(Spain) Real Madrid	2–0	0–3
Hamburg (West Germany)	3–3 (a)	(Socialist Federal Republic of Yugoslavia) Hajduk Split	1–0	2–3

=== First leg ===
5 March 1980

Nottingham Forest (England)	0–1	(East Germany) BFC Dynamo
	Report	Riediger 63'

City Ground, Nottingham
Attendance: 27,946
Referee: Alexis Ponnet (Belgium)

5 March 1980

Strasbourg (France)	0–0	(Netherlands) Ajax
	Report

Stade de la Meinau, Strasbourg
Attendance: 20,200
Referee: Franz Wöhrer (Austria)

5 March 1980

Celtic (Scotland)	2–0	(Spain) Real Madrid
McCluskey 52'; Doyle 75'	Report

Celtic Park, Glasgow
Attendance: 67,000
Referee: Riccardo Lattanzi (Italy)

5 March 1980

Hamburg (West Germany)	1–0	(Socialist Federal Republic of Yugoslavia) Hajduk Split
Reimann 45'	Report

Volksparkstadion, Hamburg
Attendance: 52,000
Referee: Ian Foote (Scotland)

=== Second leg ===
19 March 1980

BFC Dynamo (East Germany)	1–3	(England) Nottingham Forest
Terletzki 49' (pen.)	Report	Francis 15', 35'; Robertson 39' (pen.)

Friedrich-Ludwig-Jahn-Stadion, East Berlin
Attendance: 28,000–30,000
Referee: Alain Delmer (France)

Nottingham Forest won 3–2 on aggregate.

19 March 1980

Ajax (Netherlands)	4–0	(France) Strasbourg
Schoenaker 35'; Arnesen 38'; Lerby 55'; La Ling 90'	Report

Olympisch Stadion, Amsterdam
Attendance: 42,875
Referee: George Courtney (England)

Ajax won 4–0 on aggregate.

19 March 1980

Real Madrid (Spain)	3–0	(Scotland) Celtic
Santillana 45'; Stielike 56'; Juanito 86'	Report

Santiago Bernabeu Stadium, Madrid
Attendance: 110,000
Referee: Károly Palotai (Hungary)

Real Madrid won 3–2 on aggregate.

19 March 1980

Hajduk Split (Socialist Federal Republic of Yugoslavia)	3–2	(West Germany) Hamburg
Zl. Vujović 21'; Đorđević 50'; Primorac 86'	Report	Hrubesch 2'; Hieronymus 23'

Stadion Poljud, Split
Attendance: 52,000
Referee: Ernst Dörflinger-Buser (Switzerland)

3–3 on aggregate; Hamburg won on away goals.

== Semi-finals ==
Team 1	Agg.	Team 2	1st leg	2nd leg
Nottingham Forest (England)	2–1	(Netherlands) Ajax	2–0	0–1
Real Madrid (Spain)	3–5	(West Germany) Hamburg	2–0	1–5

=== First leg ===
9 April 1980

Nottingham Forest (England)	2–0	(Netherlands) Ajax
Francis 33'; Robertson 61' (pen.)	Report

City Ground, Nottingham
Attendance: 31,244
Referee: André Daina (Switzerland)

9 April 1980

Real Madrid (Spain)	2–0	(West Germany) Hamburg
Santillana 67', 80'	Report

Santiago Bernabeu Stadium, Madrid
Attendance: 121,106
Referee: Vojtěch Christov (Czechoslovakia)

=== Second leg ===
23 April 1980

Ajax (Netherlands)	1–0	(England) Nottingham Forest
Lerby 65'	Report

Olympisch Stadion, Amsterdam
Attendance: 54,955
Referee: Nicolae Rainea (Romania)

Nottingham Forest won 2–1 on aggregate.

23 April 1980

Hamburg (West Germany)	5–1	(Spain) Real Madrid
Kaltz 10' (pen.), 40'; Hrubesch 17', 45'; Memering 90'	Report	Cunningham 31'

Volksparkstadion, Hamburg
Attendance: 61,980
Referee: Alberto Michelotti (Italy)

Hamburg won 5–3 on aggregate.

== Final ==
28 May 1980
20:30 CEST

Nottingham Forest (England)	1–0	(West Germany) Hamburg
Robertson 20'	Report MatchCentre

Santiago Bernabéu Stadium, Madrid
Attendance: 51,000
Referee: António Garrido (Portugal)

== Top scorers ==
The top scorers from the 1979–80 European Cup (excluding preliminary round) are as follows:

Rank	Name	Team	Goals
1	(Denmark) Søren Lerby	(Netherlands) Ajax	10
2	(Netherlands) Ton Blanker	(Netherlands) Ajax	7
2	(Germany) Horst Hrubesch	(Germany) Hamburg	7
4	(Cyprus) Sotiris Kaiafas	(Cyprus) Omonia	6
5	(Denmark) Frank Arnesen	(Netherlands) Ajax	4
5	(Netherlands) Ruud Krol	(Netherlands) Ajax	4
7	(Argentina) Carlos Bianchi	(France) Strasbourg	3
7	(England) Ian Bowyer	(England) Nottingham Forest	3
7	(England) Laurie Cunningham	(Spain) Real Madrid	3
7	(Germany) Manfred Kaltz	(Germany) Hamburg	3
7	(East Germany) Hartmut Pelka	(East Germany) BFC Dynamo	3
7	(France) Francis Piasecki	(France) Strasbourg	3
7	(Scotland) John Robertson	(England) Nottingham Forest	3
7	(Spain) Santillana	(Spain) Real Madrid	3
7	(England) Trevor Francis	(England) Nottingham Forest	3
