= 1977–78 European Cup =

European football tournament

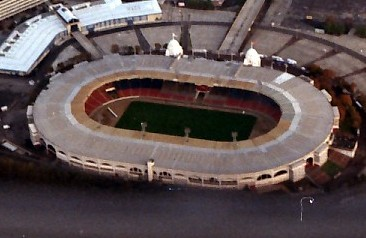
- Wembley Stadium in London hosted the final.

Tournament details
- Dates: 19 August 1977 – 10 May 1978
- Teams: 31

Final positions
- Champions: (England) Liverpool (2nd title)
- Runners-up: (Belgium) Club Brugge

Tournament statistics
- Matches played: 59
- Goals scored: 162 (2.75 per match)
- Attendance: 1,787,690 (30,300 per match)
- Top scorer(s): Allan Simonsen (Borussia Mönchengladbach); 5 goals

The 1977–78 season of the European Cup football club tournament was won by defending champions Liverpool in the final against Club Brugge. The match finished 1–0, starting a run of six consecutive finals that finished 1–0 after 90 minutes, five of them won by English clubs.

== Teams ==
(Austria) Wacker (1st)	(Belgium) Club Brugge (1st)	(Bulgaria) Levski-Spartak (1st)	(Cyprus) Omonia (1st)
(Czechoslovakia) Dukla Prague (1st)	(Denmark) Boldklubben 1903 (1st)	(England) Liverpool (1st)^{TH}	(Finland) KuPS (1st)
(France) Nantes (1st)	(East Germany) Dynamo Dresden (1st)	(West Germany) Borussia Mönchengladbach (1st)	(Greece) Panathinaikos (1st)
(Hungary) Vasas (1st)	(Iceland) Valur (1st)	(Republic of Ireland) Sligo Rovers (1st)	(Italy) Juventus (1st)
(Luxembourg) Jeunesse Esch (1st)	(Malta) Floriana (1st)	(Netherlands) Ajax (1st)	(Northern Ireland) Glentoran (1st)
(Norway) Lillestrøm (1st)	(Poland) Śląsk Wrocław (1st)	(Portugal) Benfica (1st)	(Romania) Dinamo București (1st)
(Scotland) Celtic (1st)	(Spain) Atlético Madrid (1st)	(Sweden) Halmstad (1st)	(Switzerland) Basel (1st)
(Turkey) Trabzonspor (1st)	(Soviet Union) Torpedo Moscow (1st)	(Socialist Federal Republic of Yugoslavia) Red Star Belgrade (1st)	

== Bracket ==
First round
(Bulgaria) Levski-Spartak	3	2	5
(Poland) Śląsk Wrocław	0	2	2
(Norway) Lillestrøm	2	0	2
(Netherlands) Ajax	0	4	4
(Iceland) Valur	1	0	1
(Northern Ireland) Glentoran	0	2	2
(Cyprus) Omonia	0	0	0
(Italy) Juventus	3	2	5
(Finland) KuPS	0	2	2
(Belgium) Brugge	4	5	9
(Malta) Floriana	1	0	1
(Greece) Panathinaikos	1	4	5
(Czechoslovakia) Dukla Prague	1	0	1
(France) Nantes (a)	1	0	1
(Romania) Dinamo București	2	0	2
(Spain) Atlético Madrid	1	2	3
(Scotland) Celtic	5	6	11
(Luxembourg) Jeunesse Esch	0	1	1
(Switzerland) Basel	1	1	2
(Austria) Wacker	3	0	3
(Socialist Federal Republic of Yugoslavia) Red Star Belgrade	3	3	6
(Republic of Ireland) Sligo Rovers	0	0	0
(Hungary) Vasas	0	1	1
(West Germany) B. M'gladbach	3	1	4
(Portugal) Benfica (p)	0	0	0 (4)
(Soviet Union) Torpedo Moscow	0	0	0 (1)
(Turkey) Trabzonspor	1	0	1
(Denmark) Boldklubben 1903	0	2	2
(East Germany) Dynamo Dresden	2	1	3
(Sweden) Halmstad	0	2	2

Second round
(Bulgaria) Levski-Spartak	1	1	2
(Netherlands) Ajax	2	2	4
(Northern Ireland) Glentoran	0	0	0
(Italy) Juventus	1	5	6
(Belgium) Club Brugge	2	0	2
(Greece) Panathinaikos	0	1	1
(France) Nantes	1	1	2
(Spain) Atlético Madrid	1	2	3
(Scotland) Celtic	2	0	2
(Austria) Wacker	1	3	4
(Socialist Federal Republic of Yugoslavia) Red Star Belgrade	0	1	1
(West Germany) B. M'gladbach	3	5	8
(Portugal) Benfica	1	1	2
(Denmark) Boldklubben 1903	0	0	0
(England) Liverpool	5	1	6
(East Germany) Dynamo Dresden	1	2	3

Quarter-finals
(Netherlands) Ajax	1	1	2 (0)
(Italy) Juventus	1	1	2 (3)
(Belgium) Brugge	2	2	4
(Spain) Atlético Madrid	0	3	3
(Austria) Wacker	3	0	3
(West Germany) B. M'gladbach (a)	1	2	3
(Portugal) Benfica	1	1	2
(England) Liverpool	2	4	6

Semi-finals
(Italy) Juventus	1	0	1
(Belgium) Brugge	0	2	2
(West Germany) B. M'gladbach	2	0	2
(England) Liverpool	1	3	4

Final
(Belgium) Brugge	0
(England) Liverpool	1

== First round ==
Team 1	Agg.	Team 2	1st leg	2nd leg
Celtic (Scotland)	11–1	(Luxembourg) Jeunesse Esch	5–0	6–1
Basel (Switzerland)	2–3	(Austria) Wacker	1–3	1–0
Red Star Belgrade (Socialist Federal Republic of Yugoslavia)	6–0	(Republic of Ireland) Sligo Rovers	3–0	3–0
Vasas (Hungary)	1–4	(West Germany) Borussia Mönchengladbach	0–3	1–1
Benfica (Portugal)	0–0 (4–1 p)	(Soviet Union) Torpedo Moscow	0–0	0–0
Trabzonspor (Turkey)	1–2	(Denmark) Boldklubben 1903	1–0	0–2
Liverpool (England)	Bye		–	–
Dynamo Dresden (East Germany)	3–2	(Sweden) Halmstad	2–0	1–2
Levski-Spartak (Bulgaria)	5–2	(Poland) Śląsk Wrocław	3–0	2–2
Lillestrøm (Norway)	2–4	(Netherlands) Ajax	2–0	0–4
Valur (Iceland)	1–2	(Northern Ireland) Glentoran	1–0	0–2
Omonia (Cyprus)	0–5	(Italy) Juventus	0–3	0–2
KuPS (Finland)	2–9	(Belgium) Club Brugge	0–4	2–5
Floriana (Malta)	1–5	(Greece) Panathinaikos	1–1	0–4
Dukla Prague (Czechoslovakia)	1–1 (a)	(France) Nantes	1–1	0–0
Dinamo București (Romania)	2–3	(Spain) Atlético Madrid	2–1	0–2

=== First leg ===
14 September 1977

Celtic (Scotland)	5–0	(Luxembourg) Jeunesse Esch
MacDonald 15'; Craig 33', 58'; Wilson 36'; McLaughlin 83'	Report

Celtic Park, Glasgow
Attendance: 22,000
Referee: Eamonn Farrell (Ireland)

14 September 1967

Basel (Switzerland)	1–3	(Austria) Wacker
Von Wartburg 22'	Report	Welzl 41', 45' (pen.); Constantini 51'

St. Jakob Stadion, Basel
Attendance: 17,361
Referee: Achille Verbecke (France)

14 September 1977

Red Star Belgrade (Socialist Federal Republic of Yugoslavia)	3–0	(Republic of Ireland) Sligo Rovers
Džajić 54', 80'; Filipović 67'	Report

Stadion Crvena Zvezda, Belgrade
Attendance: 22,647
Referee: Nikolaos Zlatanos (Greece)

14 September 1977

Vasas (Hungary)	0–3	(West Germany) Borussia Mönchengladbach
	Report	Schäfer 17'; Simonsen 34'; Wohlers 45'

Népstadion, Budapest
Attendance: 27,000
Referee: Jean Dubach (Switzerland)

14 September 1977

Benfica (Portugal)	0–0	(Soviet Union) Torpedo Moscow
	Report

Estádio da Luz, Lisbon
Attendance: 60,000
Referee: Robert Wurtz (France)

14 September 1977

Trabzonspor (Turkey)	1–0	(Denmark) Boldklubben 1903
Ergün 75'	Report

Hüseyin Avni Aker Stadyumu, Trabzon
Attendance: 15,000
Referee: Marijan Rauš (Yugoslavia)

14 September 1977

Dynamo Dresden (East Germany)	2–0	(Sweden) Halmstad
Heidler 70'; Schade 84'	Report

Dynamostadion, Dresden
Attendance: 29,708
Referee: Panayotis Koliropoulos (Greece)

14 September 1977

Levski-Spartak (Bulgaria)	3–0	(Poland) Śląsk Wrocław
Panov 20'; Milanov 40', 43'	Report

Georgi Asparuhov Stadium, Sofia
Attendance: 40,000
Referee: Valentin Lipatov (Soviet Union)

14 September 1977

Lillestrøm (Norway)	2–0	(Netherlands) Ajax
Lønstad 1'; Johansen 13'	Report

Ullevaal Stadion, Oslo
Attendance: 20,035
Referee: William Anderson (Scotland)

15 September 1977

Valur (Iceland)	1–0	(Northern Ireland) Glentoran
Bergs 38'	Report

Laugardalsvöllur, Reykjavík
Attendance: 3,116
Referee: Rolf Haugen (Norway)

14 September 1977

Omonia (Cyprus)	0–3	(Italy) Juventus
	Report	Bettega 34'; Fanna 42'; Virdis 59'

GSP Stadium, Nicosia
Attendance: 7,500
Referee: Nikola Dudin (Bulgaria)

14 September 1977

KuPS (Finland)	0–4	(Belgium) Club Brugge
	Report	Vandereycken 49'; Cools 51'; Lambert 64'; Davies 78'

Väinölänniemi, Kuopio
Attendance: 2,560
Referee: Eldar Zade (Soviet Union)

14 September 1977

Floriana (Malta)	1–1	(Greece) Panathinaikos
Xuereb 16'	Report	Aslanidis 26'

Empire Stadium, Gżira
Attendance: 7,888
Referee: Dusan Maksimović (Yugoslavia)

14 September 1977

Dukla Prague (Czechoslovakia)	1–1	(France) Nantes
Vízek 54'	Report	Amisse 35'

Stadion Juliska, Prague
Attendance: 13,885
Referee: Werner Spiegl (Austria)

15 September 1977

Dinamo București (Romania)	2–1	(Spain) Atlético Madrid
Vrînceanu 14'; Georgescu 73'	Report	Pereira 58'

Stadionul 23 August, Bucharest
Attendance: 45,000
Referee: Hilmi Ok (Turkey)

=== Second leg ===
28 September 1977

Jeunesse Esch (Luxembourg)	1–6	(Scotland) Celtic
Giuliani 1'	Report	Lennox 30'; Glavin 52', 60'; Craig 56'; Eðvaldsson 66', 76'

Stade de la Frontière, Esch-sur-Alzette
Attendance: 3,580
Referee: Siem Wellinga (Netherlands)

Celtic won 11–1 on aggregate.

28 September 1977

Wacker (Austria)	0–1	(Switzerland) Basel
	Report	Maissen 62'

Stadion Lehen, Salzburg
Attendance: 14,000
Referee: Adolf Prokop (East Germany)

Wacker won 3–2 on aggregate.

28 September 1977

Sligo Rovers (Republic of Ireland)	0–3	(Socialist Federal Republic of Yugoslavia) Red Star Belgrade
	Report	Filipović 55', 60'; Jovanović 43'

The Showgrounds, Sligo
Attendance: 10,000
Referee: John Gow (Wales)

Red Star Belgrade won 6–0 on aggregate.

28 September 1977

Borussia Mönchengladbach (West Germany)	1–1	(Hungary) Vasas
Simonsen 64'	Report	Izsó 77'

Bökelbergstadion, Mönchengladbach
Attendance: 15,000
Referee: Alfred Delcourt (Belgium)

Borussia Mönchengladbach won 4–1 on aggregate.

28 September 1977

Torpedo Moscow (Soviet Union)	0–0 (a.e.t.)	(Portugal) Benfica
	Report
Penalties
Yurin (penalty missed); Nikonov (penalty missed); Belenkov (penalty scored)	1–4	(penalty scored) Pietra; (penalty scored) José Luís; (penalty scored) Chalana; (penalty scored) Bento

Central Dynamo Stadium, Moscow
Attendance: 25,000
Referee: Erik Fredriksson (Sweden)

0–0 on aggregate; Benfica won on penalties.

28 September 1977

Boldklubben 1903 (Denmark)	2–0	(Turkey) Trabzonspor
Francker 40', 82'	Report

Københavns Idrætspark, Copenhagen
Attendance: 6,700
Referee: Rolf Ericsson (Sweden)

Boldklubben 1903 won 2–1 on aggregate.

28 September 1977

Halmstad (Sweden)	2–1	(East Germany) Dynamo Dresden
Johansson 17'; Larsson 88'	Report	Heidler 64'

Örjans Vall, Halmstad
Attendance: 5,600
Referee: Alf Grey (England)

Dynamo Dresden won 3–2 on aggregate.

28 September 1977

Śląsk Wrocław (Poland)	2–2	(Bulgaria) Levski-Spartak
Pawłowski 22'; Kopycki 75'	Report	Panov 29', 58'

Olympic Stadium, Wrocław
Attendance: 25,000
Referee: Károly Palotai (Hungary)

Levski-Spartak won 5–2 on aggregate.

28 September 1977

Ajax (Netherlands)	4–0	(Norway) Lillestrøm
Birkelund 10' (o.g.); Geels 31'; Ling 51', 72'	Report

De Meer, Amsterdam
Attendance: 16,500
Referee: Anders Mattsson (Finland)

Ajax won 4–2 on aggregate.

29 September 1977

Glentoran (Northern Ireland)	2–0	(Iceland) Valur
Robson 18'; Jamison 73'	Report

The Oval, Belfast
Attendance: 7,000
Referee: Johannes-Frederik Beck (Netherlands)

Glentoran won 2–1 on aggregate.

28 September 1977

Juventus (Italy)	2–0	(Cyprus) Omonia
Boninsegna 11'; Virdis 75'	Report

Stadio Comunale, Turin
Attendance: 13,984
Referee: Marcel Hermann (Luxembourg)

Juventus won 5–0 on aggregate.

28 September 1977

Club Brugge (Belgium)	5–2	(Finland) KuPS
Davies 17', 35'; Vandereycken 33'; Simoen 47'; Maes 85'	Report	Mönkkönen 20'; Loikkanen 63'

Olympiastadion, Bruges
Attendance: 12,145
Referee: Ángel Franco Martínez (Spain)

Club Brugge won 9–2 on aggregate.

28 September 1977

Panathinaikos (Greece)	4–0	(Malta) Floriana
Álvarez 24'; Antoniadis 35', 40' (pen.); Gonios 85'	Report

Leoforos Alexandras Stadium, Athens
Attendance: 10,838
Referee: Constantin Dinulescu (Romania)

Panathinaikos won 5–1 on aggregate.

28 September 1977

Nantes (France)	0–0	(Czechoslovakia) Dukla Prague
	Report

Stade Marcel-Saupin, Nantes
Attendance: 16,353
Referee: António Garrido (Portugal)

1–1 on aggregate; Nantes won on away goals.

28 September 1977

Atlético Madrid (Spain)	2–0	(Romania) Dinamo București
Benegas 67'; Cano 81'	Report

Vicente Calderón Stadium, Madrid
Attendance: 50,000
Referee: Klaus Ohmsen (West Germany)

Atlético Madrid won 3–2 on aggregate.

== Second round ==
Team 1	Agg.	Team 2	1st leg	2nd leg
Celtic (Scotland)	2–4	(Austria) Wacker	2–1	0–3
Red Star Belgrade (Socialist Federal Republic of Yugoslavia)	1–8	(West Germany) Borussia Mönchengladbach	0–3	1–5
Benfica (Portugal)	2–0	(Denmark) Boldklubben 1903	1–0	1–0
Liverpool (England)	6–3	(East Germany) Dynamo Dresden	5–1	1–2
Levski-Spartak (Bulgaria)	2–4	(Netherlands) Ajax	1–2	1–2
Glentoran (Northern Ireland)	0–6	(Italy) Juventus	0–1	0–5
Club Brugge (Belgium)	2–1	(Greece) Panathinaikos	2–0	0–1
Nantes (France)	2–3	(Spain) Atlético Madrid	1–1	1–2

=== First leg ===
19 October 1977

Celtic (Scotland)	2–1	(Austria) Wacker
Craig 49'; Burns 78'	Report	Kriess 54'

Celtic Park, Glasgow
Attendance: 25,500
Referee: Rolf Nyhus (Norway)

19 October 1977

Red Star Belgrade (Socialist Federal Republic of Yugoslavia)	0–3	(West Germany) Borussia Mönchengladbach
	Report	Schäfer 16'; Heynckes 45'; Simonsen 76'

Red Star Stadium, Belgrade
Attendance: 72,000
Referee: Orhan Cebe (Turkey)

19 October 1977

Benfica (Portugal)	1–0	(Denmark) Boldklubben 1903
Pietra 49' (pen.)	Report

Estádio da Luz, Lisbon
Attendance: 40,000
Referee: John Carpenter (Republic of Ireland)

19 October 1977

Liverpool (England)	5–1	(East Germany) Dynamo Dresden
Hansen 14'; Case 21', 57'; Neal 44' (pen.); Kennedy 66'	Report	Häfner 76'

Anfield, Liverpool
Attendance: 39,876
Referee: António Garrido (Portugal)

19 October 1977

Levski-Spartak (Bulgaria)	1–2	(Netherlands) Ajax
Voynov 80' (pen.)	Report	Geels 30'; Erkens 79'

Vasil Levski National Stadium, Sofia
Attendance: 70,000
Referee: Heinz Aldinger (West Germany)

19 October 1977

Glentoran (Northern Ireland)	0–1	(Italy) Juventus
	Report	Causio 38'

The Oval, Belfast
Attendance: 30,000
Referee: Frans Derks (Netherlands)

19 October 1977

Club Brugge (Belgium)	2–0	(Greece) Panathinaikos
Davies 24' (pen.); Sørensen 72'	Report

Olympiastadion, Bruges
Attendance: 22,000
Referee: John Gordon (Scotland)

19 October 1977

Nantes (France)	1–1	(Spain) Atlético Madrid
Lacombe 48'	Report	Marcial 42'

Stade Marcel Saupin, Nantes
Attendance: 23,948
Referee: Clive Thomas (Wales)

=== Second leg ===
2 November 1977

Wacker (Austria)	3–0	(Scotland) Celtic
Welzl 4'; Stering 21'; Oberacher 27'	Report

Lehener Stadion, Salzburg
Attendance: 18,000
Referee: Cesare Gussoni (Italy)

Wacker won 4–2 on aggregate.

2 November 1977

Borussia Mönchengladbach (West Germany)	5–1	(Socialist Federal Republic of Yugoslavia) Red Star Belgrade
Simonsen 17', 32'; Heynckes 60'; Nikolić 62' (o.g.); Wittkamp 87'	Report	Sušić 44'

Bökelbergstadion, Mönchengladbach
Attendance: 16,000
Referee: John Homewood (England)

Borussia Mönchengladbach won 8–1 on aggregate.

2 November 1977

Boldklubben 1903 (Denmark)	0–1	(Portugal) Benfica
	Report	Pietra 50'

Københavns Idrætspark, Copenhagen
Attendance: 17,100
Referee: Michal Jursa (Czechoslovakia)

Benfica won 2–0 on aggregate.

2 November 1977

Dynamo Dresden (East Germany)	2–1	(England) Liverpool
Kotte 47'; Sachse 52'	Report	Heighway 67'

Dynamostadion, Dresden
Attendance: 34,100
Referee: Charles Corver (Netherlands)

Liverpool won 6–3 on aggregate.

2 November 1977

Ajax (Netherlands)	2–1	(Bulgaria) Levski-Spartak
Lerby 42'; Geels 53'	Report	Milanov 44'

Olympisch Stadion, Amsterdam
Attendance: 15,500
Referee: Ulf Eriksson (Sweden)

Ajax won 4–2 on aggregate.

2 November 1977

Juventus (Italy)	5–0	(Northern Ireland) Glentoran
Virdis 10', 20'; Boninsegna 53'; Fanna 70'; Benetti 77'	Report

Stadio Comunale, Turin
Attendance: 23,064
Referee: Francisc Coloşi (Romania)

Juventus won 6–0 on aggregate.

2 November 1977

Panathinaikos (Greece)	1–0	(Belgium) Club Brugge
Gonios 82'	Report

Leofóros, Athens
Attendance: 25,000
Referee: Adolf Prokop (East Germany)

Club Brugge won 2–1 on aggregate.

2 November 1977

Atlético Madrid (Spain)	2–1	(France) Nantes
Cano 76'; Pereira 80'	Report	Lacombe 31'

Estadio Vicente Calderón, Madrid
Attendance: 54,000
Referee: Károly Palotai (Hungary)

Atlético Madrid won 3–2 on aggregate.

== Quarter-finals ==
Team 1	Agg.	Team 2	1st leg	2nd leg
Wacker (Austria)	3–3 (a)	(West Germany) Borussia Mönchengladbach	3–1	0–2
Benfica (Portugal)	2–6	(England) Liverpool	1–2	1–4
Ajax (Netherlands)	2–2 (0–3 p)	(Italy) Juventus	1–1	1–1
Club Brugge (Belgium)	4–3	(Spain) Atlético Madrid	2–0	2–3

=== First leg ===
1 March 1978

Wacker (Austria)	3–1	(West Germany) Borussia Mönchengladbach
Koncilia 8'; Kriess 23'; Schwarz 27'	Report	Heynckes 63'

Tivoli, Innsbruck
Attendance: 17,000
Referee: Nicolae Rainea (Romania)

1 March 1978

Benfica (Portugal)	1–2	(England) Liverpool
Nené 13'	Report	Case 36'; Hughes 71'

Estádio da Luz, Lisbon
Attendance: 80,000
Referee: Frans Derks (Netherlands)

1 March 1978

Ajax (Netherlands)	1–1	(Italy) Juventus
Van Dord 86'	Report	Causio 89'

Olympisch Stadion, Amsterdam
Attendance: 37,000
Referee: Adolf Prokop (East Germany)

1 March 1978

Club Brugge (Belgium)	2–0	(Spain) Atlético Madrid
Courant 44'; De Cubber 57'	Report

Olympiastadion, Bruges
Attendance: 28,000
Referee: Heinz Aldinger (West Germany)

=== Second leg ===
15 March 1978

Borussia Mönchengladbach (West Germany)	2–0	(Austria) Wacker
Bonhof 19' (pen.); Heynckes 32'	Report

Bökelbergstadion, Mönchengladbach
Attendance: 32,000
Referee: Ulf Eriksson (Sweden)

3–3 on aggregate; Borussia Mönchengladbach won on away goals.

15 March 1978

Liverpool (England)	4–1	(Portugal) Benfica
Callaghan 6'; Dalglish 17'; McDermott 78'; Neal 88'	Report	Nené 25'

Anfield, Liverpool
Attendance: 48,364
Referee: Georges Konrath (France)

Liverpool won 6–2 on aggregate.

15 March 1978

Juventus (Italy)	1–1 (a.e.t.)	(Netherlands) Ajax
Tardelli 21'	Report	Ling 80'
Penalties
Gentile (penalty missed); Benetti (penalty scored); Cabrini (penalty scored); Causio (penalty scored)	3–0	(penalty missed) Geels; (penalty missed) Van Dord; (penalty missed) Ling

Stadio Comunale, Turin
Attendance: 68,497
Referee: Károly Palotai (Hungary)

2–2 on aggregate; Juventus won 3–0 on penalties.

15 March 1978

Atlético Madrid (Spain)	3–2	(Belgium) Club Brugge
Benegas 20'; Pina 30', 62'	Report	Cools 60'; Lambert 69'

Estadio Vicente Calderón, Madrid
Attendance: 70,000
Referee: Pat Partridge (England)

Club Brugge won 4–3 on aggregate.

== Semi-finals ==
Team 1	Agg.	Team 2	1st leg	2nd leg
Borussia Mönchengladbach (West Germany)	2–4	(England) Liverpool	2–1	0–3
Juventus (Italy)	1–2	(Belgium) Club Brugge	1–0	0–2

=== First leg ===
29 March 1978

Borussia Mönchengladbach (West Germany)	2–1	(England) Liverpool
Hannes 28'; Bonhof 89'	Report	Johnson 88'

Rheinstadion, Düsseldorf
Attendance: 62,000
Referee: Emilio Guruceta Muro (Spain)

29 March 1978

Juventus (Italy)	1–0	(Belgium) Club Brugge
Bettega 86'	Report

Stadio Comunale, Turin
Attendance: 62,341
Referee: Jean Dubach (Switzerland)

=== Second leg ===
12 April 1978

Liverpool (England)	3–0	(West Germany) Borussia Mönchengladbach
Kennedy 6'; Dalglish 35'; Case 56'	Report

Anfield, Liverpool
Attendance: 51,500
Referee: Károly Palotai (Hungary)

Liverpool won 4–2 on aggregate.

12 April 1978

Club Brugge (Belgium)	2–0 (a.e.t.)	(Italy) Juventus
Bastijns 3'; Vandereycken 116'	Report

Olympiastadion, Bruges
Attendance: 32,000
Referee: Ulf Eriksson (Sweden)

Club Brugge won 2–1 on aggregate.

== Final ==
10 May 1978
19:15 BST

Club Brugge (Belgium)	0–1	(England) Liverpool
	Report MatchCentre	Dalglish 64'

Wembley Stadium, London
Attendance: 92,500
Referee: Charles Corver (Netherlands)

== Top scorers ==
Rank	Name	Team	Goals
1	(Denmark) Allan Simonsen	(West Germany) Borussia Mönchengladbach	5
2	(England) Jimmy Case	(England) Liverpool	4
2	(Scotland) Joe Craig	(Scotland) Celtic	4
2	(England) Roger Davies	(Belgium) Club Brugge	4
2	(West Germany) Jupp Heynckes	(West Germany) Borussia Mönchengladbach	4
2	(Italy) Pietro Paolo Virdis	(Italy) Juventus	4
7	(Scotland) Kenny Dalglish	(England) Liverpool	3
7	(Socialist Federal Republic of Yugoslavia) Zoran Filipović	(Socialist Federal Republic of Yugoslavia) Red Star Belgrade	3
7	(Netherlands) Ruud Geels	(Netherlands) Ajax	3
7	(Netherlands) Tschen La Ling	(Netherlands) Ajax	3
7	(Bulgaria) Kiril Milanov	(Bulgaria) Levski-Spartak	3
7	(Bulgaria) Pavel Panov	(Bulgaria) Levski-Spartak	3
7	(Spain) Marcial Pina	(Spain) Atlético Madrid	3
7	(Belgium) René Vandereycken	(Belgium) Club Brugge	3
7	(Austria) Kurt Welzl	(Austria) Wacker	3
