= Tschen La Ling =

Dutch footballer (born 1956)

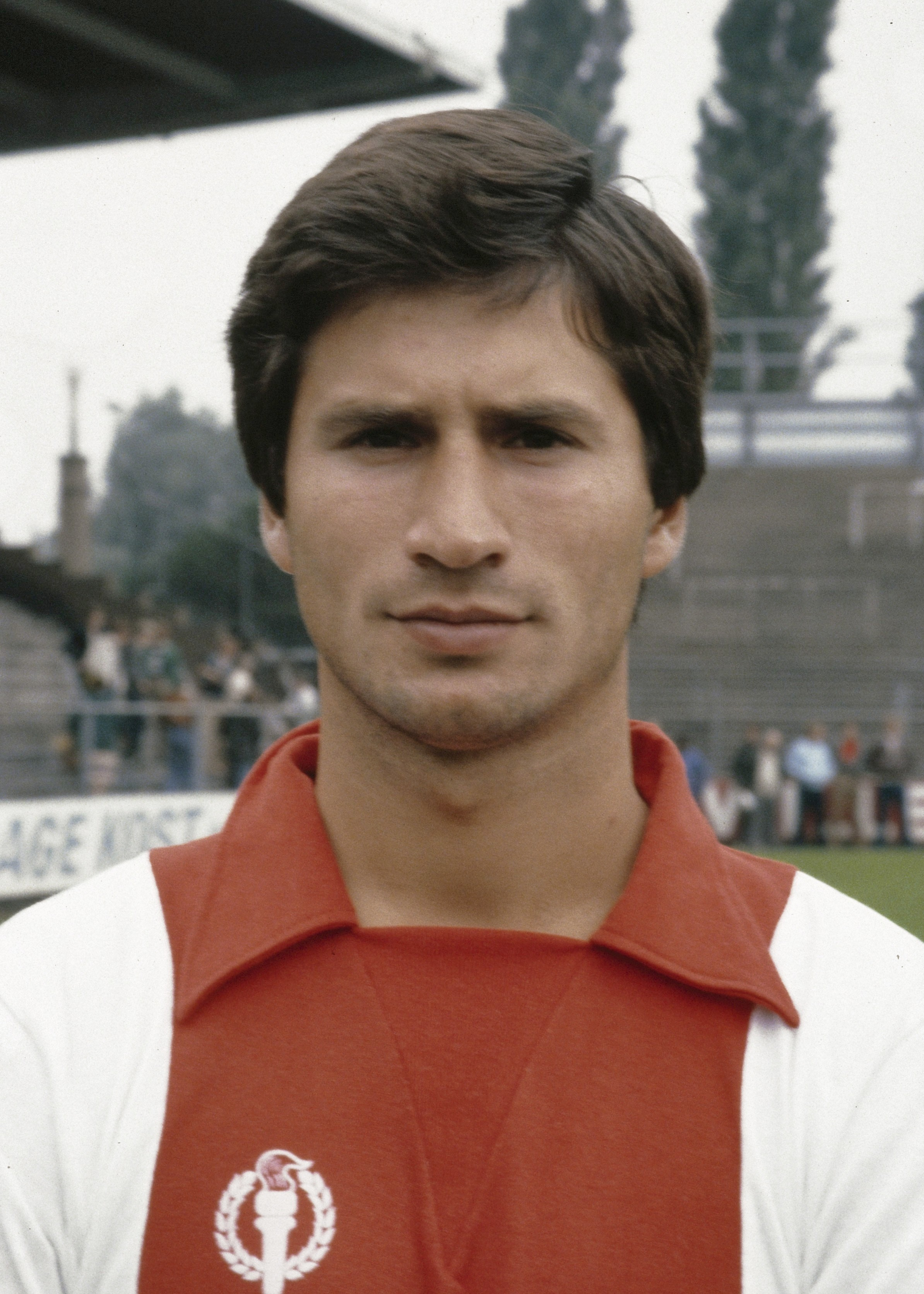
- Ling with Ajax in July 1979

Personal information
- Date of birth: 6 January 1956 (age 70)
- Place of birth: The Hague, Netherlands
- Height: 1.88 m (6 ft 2 in)
- Position: Right winger

Senior career*
Years	Team	Apps	(Gls)
1973–1975	FC Den Haag	42	(3)
1975–1982	Ajax	172	(54)
1982–1984	Panathinaikos	46	(4)
1984–1985	Marseille	27	(6)
1985–1986	Feyenoord	18	(1)
1986–1987	FC Den Haag	10	(0)
Total		315	(68)

International career
1977–1982	Netherlands	14	(2)
- * Club domestic league appearances and goals

Tschen La Ling (Chinese: 林球立; pinyin: Lín Qiú Lì; born 6 January 1956) is a Dutch former professional footballer who most notably played for Ajax as a right winger. His name has been spelled in various ways throughout his career, but usually as Tscheu La Ling; he was generally uninterested in how it was spelled but revealed in a February 2007 interview that his name was officially Ling Tschen La. In June 2015, he was appointed to the advisory board of Ajax.

Ling is the owner of Slovak football club AS Trenčín and a dietary supplement brand, Fitshape.

== Club career ==
Born in The Hague to a Chinese father and a Dutch mother, Ling joined Ajax in 1975 from hometown club FC Den Haag. Despite winning the 1976–77, 1978–79, 1979–80 and 1981–82 Eredivisie titles while also reaching four Dutch Cup finals in a row between 1978 and 1981, Ajax could not replicate their early 1970s exploits. Only in 1980 were they able to reach a European Cup semi-final. Ling played together with the likes of Ruud Krol, Ruud Geels, Frank Arnesen, Soren Lerby, Simon Tahamata and Martin van Geel, and later also with Wim Kieft, Frank Rijkaard, Gerald Vanenburg, Jesper Olsen and Sonny Silooy. In December 1981, Johan Cruyff reunited with some of his former teammates at Ajax, causing Ling to lose his starting place once Vanenburg stepped in. After two years overseas with Panathinaikos and Marseille, Ling spent the 1985–86 season at Ajax's bitter rivals Feyenoord, then moved back to Den Haag and retired in 1987.

== International career ==
Ling played for the Dutch team during qualifying for UEFA Euro 1980. He earned 14 caps for the Netherlands and scored 2 goals from 1977 to 1982.

== Post-playing career ==
In 2017, Ling joined FC Eindhoven as a technical advisor, focusing on scouting, youth development, and the club's technical structure. He also assisted in appointing a new head coach, aiming to professionalise operations and align with the club's vision of developing young talent.

== Honours ==
Ajax

- Eredivisie: 1976–77, 1978–79, 1979–80, 1981–82
- KNVB Cup: 1978–79

Panathinaikos

- Alpha Ethniki: 1983–84
- Greek Football Cup: 1983–84
