= 1978 FIFA World Cup qualification – UEFA Group 4 =

UEFA Group 4 for 1978 FIFA World Cup qualification

Group 4 consisted of four of the 32 teams entered into the European zone: Belgium, Iceland, Netherlands, and Northern Ireland. These four teams competed on a home-and-away basis for one of the 8.5 spots in the final tournament allocated to the European zone. The spot would be assigned to the group's winner.

== Standings ==
Pos	Team	Pld	W	D	L	GF	GA	GD	Pts
1	Netherlands	6	5	1	0	11	3	+8	11
2	Belgium	6	3	0	3	7	6	+1	6
3	Northern Ireland	6	2	1	3	7	6	+1	5
4	Iceland	6	1	0	5	2	12	−10	2

== Matches ==
5 September 1976

Iceland	0 – 1	Belgium
	Report	Van der Elst 73'

Reykjavík, Iceland
Referee: Carpenter (Republic of Ireland)

8 September 1976

Iceland	0 – 1	Netherlands
	Report	Geels 42'

Reykjavík, Iceland
Referee: Mulhall (Republic of Ireland)

13 October 1976

Netherlands	2 – 2	Northern Ireland
Krol 64'; Cruyff 66'	Report	McGrath 4'; Spence 88'

Rotterdam, Netherlands
Referee: Martinez (Spain)

10 November 1976

Belgium	2 – 0	Northern Ireland
Van Gool 29'; Lambert 52'	Report

Liege, Belgium
Referee: Prokop (East Germany)

26 March 1977

Belgium	0 – 2	Netherlands
	Report	Rep 19'; Cruyff 65'

Antwerp, Belgium
Referee: Gonella (Italy)

11 June 1977

Iceland	1 – 0	Northern Ireland
Albertsson 33'	Report

Reykjavík, Iceland
Referee: Glöckner (East Germany)

31 August 1977

Netherlands	4 – 1	Iceland
Van Hanegem 15'; Geels 18', 89' (pen.); Rep 35'	Report	Sigurvinsson 68'

Nijmegen, Netherlands
Referee: Hirviniemi (Finland)

3 September 1977

Belgium	4 – 0	Iceland
Van Binst 15'; Martens 20'; Courant 60'; Lambert 65'	Report

Brussels, Belgium
Referee: Thime (Norway)

21 September 1977

Northern Ireland	2 – 0	Iceland
McGrath 67'; McIlroy 76'	Report

Belfast, Northern Ireland
Referee: Lund-Sørensen (Denmark)

12 October 1977

Northern Ireland	0 – 1	Netherlands
	Report	W. van de Kerkhof 76'

Belfast, Northern Ireland
Referee: Garrido (Portugal)

26 October 1977

Netherlands	1 – 0	Belgium
R. van de Kerkhof 4'	Report

Amsterdam, Netherlands
Referee: Partridge (England)

16 November 1977

Northern Ireland	3 – 0	Belgium
Armstrong 42', 74'; McGrath 58'	Report

Belfast, Northern Ireland
Referee: Konrath (France)
