= Gino Maes =

Belgian footballer

Personal information
- Date of birth: 7 February 1957 (age 69)
- Place of birth: Bruges, Belgium
- Position: Defender

Youth career
- Club Brugge

Senior career*
Years	Team	Apps	(Gls)
1976–1982	Club Brugge	109	(4)
1982–1984	Cercle Brugge	64	(5)
1984–1987	Club Brugge	50	(0)
1987–1989	SK Torhout		
- * Club domestic league appearances and goals

Gino Maes (born 7 February 1957) is a Belgian former professional footballer who played as a left back. He spent the majority of his career with Club Brugge, for whom he played in the 1978 European Cup Final defeat to Liverpool. Maes also played for Cercle Brugge and SK Torhout.

== Honours ==
Club Brugge

- Belgian First Division: 1976–77, 1977–78, 1979–80
- Belgian Cup: 1976–77, 1985–86; runner-up 1978–79
- Belgian Supercup: 1980, 1986
- European Champion Clubs' Cup runner-up: 1977–78
- Jules Pappaert Cup: 1978
- Bruges Matins: 1979, 1981
- Japan Cup Kirin World Soccer: 1981
