= Ton Blanker =

Dutch footballer (born 1960)

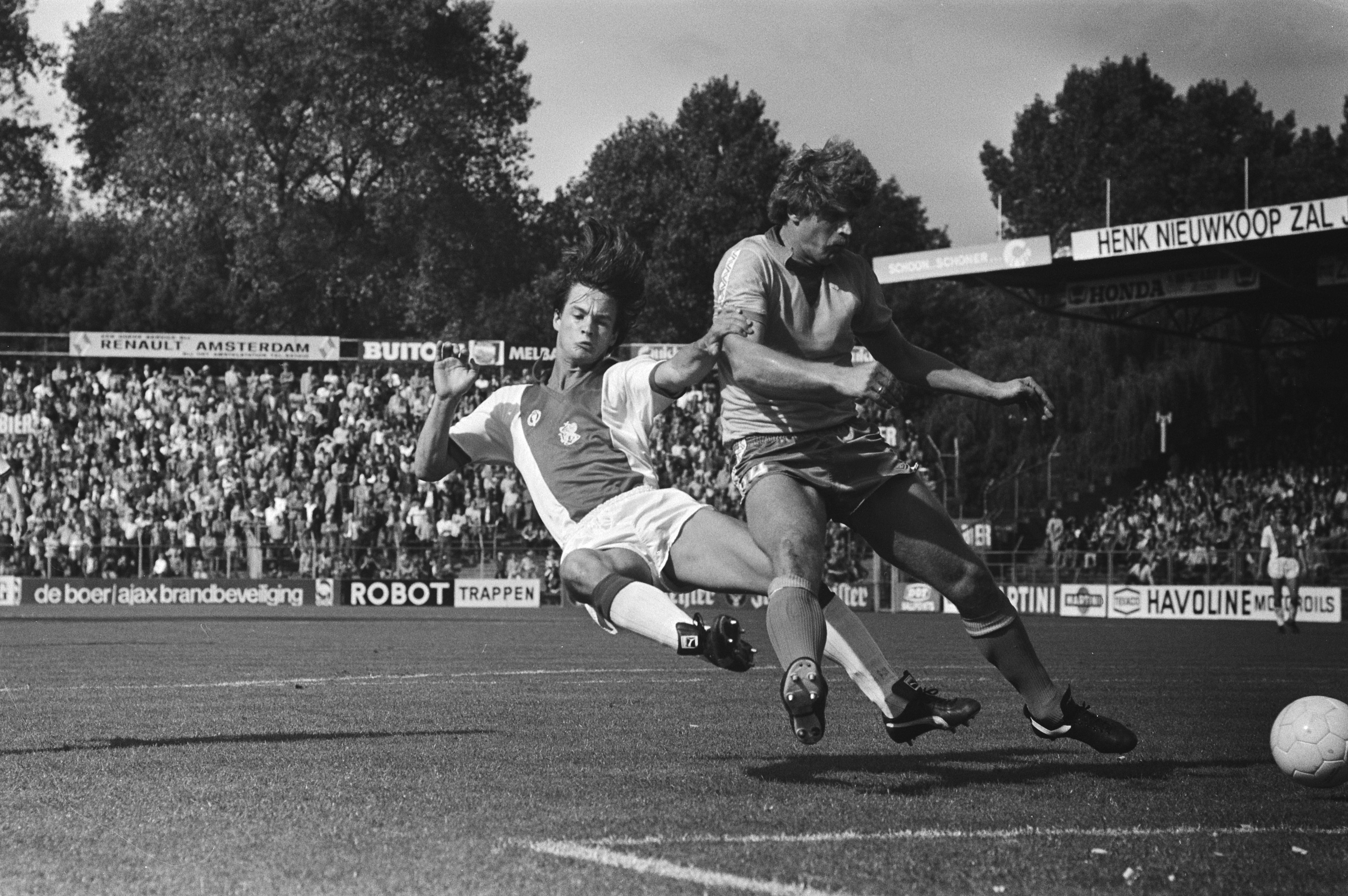
- Blanker (left) playing for Ajax in 1979

Personal information
- Full name: Anthonie Blanker
- Date of birth: 15 September 1960 (age 66)
- Place of birth: Amsterdam, Netherlands
- Position: Midfielder

Youth career
- DWS
- 1975–1979: Ajax

Senior career*
Years	Team	Apps	(Gls)
1979–1980	Ajax	15	(2)
1980–1981	Vitória de Guimarães		
1981	Real Zaragoza		
1982	Salamanca		
1982–1983	Excelsior	31	(5)
1983–1986	Volendam	53	(17)
1987–1988	Los Angeles Lazers		
1988–1989	Germinal Beerschot		
1989–1990	Cappellen		
- * Club domestic league appearances and goals

Ton Blanker (born 15 September 1960) is a Dutch retired footballer who played as a midfielder.

== Career ==
Hugely talented, Blanker was deemed the new Cruijff and started his career with Ajax winning the 1979–80 Eredivisie, and reaching the Semi-finals in the 1979–80 European Cup, where he scored four goals against HJK Helsinki in the first round, then a hat-trick against Omonia in the next round.

Afterwards, Blanker played abroad for Vitória de Guimarães, Real Zaragoza and Salamanca, then he eventually returned to Eredivisie to play for S.B.V. Excelsior and FC Volendam.

After a short spell in the United States with Los Angeles Lazers, Blanker played two years in Belgium for Germinal Beerschot and Cappellen.

== Personal life ==
Blanker was married to Anita Heilker of the Dolly Dots; they had a daughter, Robin. In 1994, Blanker was sentenced to 5 years in prison after weapons possession and drugs trafficking.
