= Ruud Geels =

Dutch footballer (1948–2023)

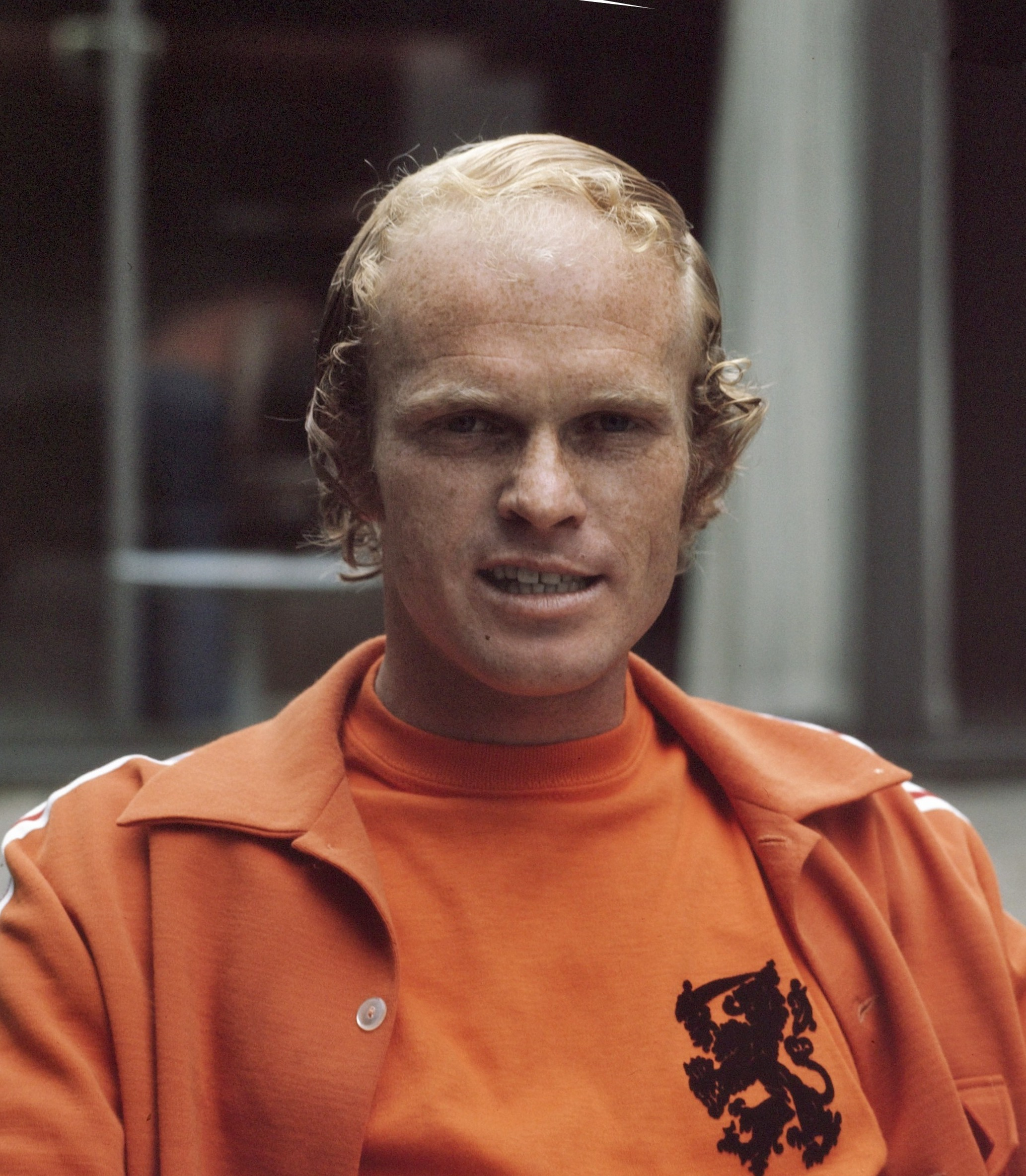
- Geels in 1974

Personal information
- Full name: Geertruida Maria Geels
- Date of birth: 28 July 1948
- Place of birth: Haarlem, Netherlands
- Date of death: 18 November 2023 (aged 75)
- Place of death: Haarlem, Netherlands
- Position: Striker

Youth career
- RKVV DSS
- RKSV Onze Gezellen

Senior career*
Years	Team	Apps	(Gls)
1965–1966	Telstar	8	(5)
1966–1970	Feijenoord	89	(46)
1970–1972	Go Ahead Eagles	62	(35)
1972–1974	Club Brugge	53	(28)
1974–1978	Ajax	132	(123)
1978–1979	Anderlecht	28	(25)
1979–1981	Sparta	48	(35)
1981–1982	PSV	32	(15)
1982–1984	NAC	22	(6)
Total		473	(318)

International career
1974–1981	Netherlands	20	(11)
Medal record
Representing Netherlands
FIFA World Cup
Runner-up	1974 West Germany
UEFA European Championship
Third place	1976 Yugoslavia
- * Club domestic league appearances and goals

Geertruida Maria "Ruud" Geels (Dutch pronunciation: [ɣeːrˈtrœydaː maːˈrijaː ryt ˈxeːls]; 28 July 1948 – 18 November 2023) was a Dutch professional footballer who played as a striker. He obtained 20 caps for the Netherlands national team, scoring eleven goals. A prolific striker known for his heading skills, Geels is the only player to win the Eredivisie topscoring title five times (followed by Marco van Basten with four titles), and is the second most scoring player in the Dutch top football division, behind Willy van der Kuijlen. He is also known for being the first of only two footballers (the second being Ronald Koeman) to play for the big three teams in Dutch football - Ajax, PSV and Feyenoord.

== Club career ==
Geels was born in Haarlem. Before joining Telstar, he played for amateur football clubs DSS and Onze Gezellen. After eight games for Telstar, Geels was sold to Feyenoord. Geels scored 46 goals in 89 league games for Feyenoord, but also faced competition for the striker position with Swede Ove Kindvall. He won the Eredivisie and the KNVB Cup in 1968–69, and the European Cup in 1969–70, although he was not part of the squad for the final against Celtic.

In 1970, Geels left Feyenoord for Go Ahead Eagles, where he played for two seasons, scoring 35 goals. In the summer of 1972, Geels left his native Netherlands for Belgium to play for Club Brugge, scoring 28 goals for the Bruges club. He returned to the Netherlands after the 1974 World Cup to play for Ajax. In the Amsterdam club, Geels scored 123 goals in 131 league matches, and was the Eredivisie's top scorer for four consecutive seasons, winning the 1976–77 season in his third consecutive season as top scorer of the league. He was also top scorer in the 1975–76 UEFA Cup with 10 goals.

Geels returned to Belgium in 1978 to play for Anderlecht, where he won the 1978 UEFA Super Cup against Liverpool. He returned to the Netherlands in 1979 to play for Sparta Rotterdam, scoring 35 goals in two seasons, while also becoming for the fifth time the best Eredivisie top scorer in 1980–81.

He then signed for PSV Eindhoven in 1981, making him the first player to play for the Big Three in the Netherlands. He scored 15 goals in 25 league games in his first season, but only played four games in his second season with the Eindhoven club, never scoring any goals. Geels was then sold to NAC Breda in 1982, netting six goals in 22 league games, but after NAC's relegation, he never played again for the club, and his contract was terminated in 1984.

== International career ==
Geels played for the Netherlands 20 times and scored 11 goals. He was called to represent his country in the 1974 World Cup, but did not play a single match. Geels later described the World Cup as one of the worst weeks of his life due to daily harassment from Wim Suurbier and Ruud Krol, with whom he would play at Ajax after the World Cup. He helped the Netherlands win a third place at the UEFA Euro 1976 by scoring two goals against Yugoslavia in the play-off for the third place.

== Style of play ==
A fast, agile striker, Geels was one of the most prolific goalscorers in Europe in the 70's. He was renowned for his heading skills and aerial abilities. In an interview with Voetbal International, Geels explained that he practiced his heading skills at Telstar by using an old English head gallow, noting that "You always have to be a beat ahead of your opponent". In a NRC article about Geels, Jaap Bloembergen wrote that no one jumped higher and headed a ball harder than Geels.

== Personal life ==
Geels was the father of Luciène Geels, who played for the Dutch women's softball team for many years and participated in the 1996 Summer Olympics.

Geels died on 18 November 2023, at the age of 75, having suffered from Alzheimer's disease for a long time.

== Career statistics ==
=== Club ===
Appearances and goals by club, season and competition
Club	Season	League			Cup		Europe		Other		Total	
Club	Season	Division	Apps	Goals	Apps	Goals	Apps	Goals	Apps	Goals	Apps	Goals
Telstar	1965–66	Eredivisie	8	5	1	1	—		—		9	6
Feijenoord	1966–67	Eredivisie	25	8	1	0	—		—		26	8
Feijenoord	1967–68	Eredivisie	32	20	3	0	—		—		35	20
Feijenoord	1968–69	Eredivisie	20	10	3	2	1 (Note: Appearances in Inter-Cities Fairs Cup)	0	—		24	12
Feijenoord	1969–70	Eredivisie	12	8	1	0	4 (Note: Appearances in European Cup)	6	—		17	14
Feijenoord	Total		89	46	8	2	5	6	—		102	54
Go Ahead Eagles	1970–71	Eredivisie	34	17	2	2	—		—		36	19
Go Ahead Eagles	1971–72	Eredivisie	28	18	2	1	—		—		30	19
Go Ahead Eagles	Total		62	35	4	3	—		—		66	38
Club Brugge	1972–73	Belgian First Division	23	10			4 (Note: Appearances in UEFA Cup)	2	—		27	12
Club Brugge	1973–74	Belgian First Division	30	18			4	0	—		34	18
Club Brugge	Total		53	28			8	2	—		61	30
Ajax	1974–75	Eredivisie	33	30	2	3	5	1	—		40	34
Ajax	1975–76	Eredivisie	33	29	3	3	6	11	—		42	43
Ajax	1976–77	Eredivisie	34	34	1	0	2	0	—		37	34
Ajax	1977–78	Eredivisie	32	30	6	6	6	3	—		44	39
Ajax	Total		132	123	12	12	19	15	—		163	150
Anderlecht	1978–79	Belgian First Division	28	25			2 (Note: Appearances in European Cup Winners' Cup)	0	2 (Note: Appearances in UEFA Super Cup)	0	32	25
Sparta Rotterdam	1979–80	Eredivisie	18	13	2	0	—		—		20	13
Sparta Rotterdam	1980–81	Eredivisie	30	22	1	1	—		—		31	23
Sparta Rotterdam	Total		48	35	3	1	—		—		51	36
PSV	1981–82	Eredivisie	28	15	2	1	4	3	—		34	19
PSV	1982–83	Eredivisie	4	0	—		—		—		4	0
PSV	Total		32	15	2	1	4	3	—		38	19
NAC	1982–83	Eredivisie	22	6	1	0	—		—		23	6
NAC	1983-84	Eerste Divisie			2	1	—		—		2	1
NAC	Total		22	6	3	1	—		—		25	7
Career total			474	318	33	21	38	26	2	0	547	365

=== International ===
Appearances and goals by national team and year
National team	Year	Apps	Goals
Netherlands	1974	5	1
Netherlands	1975	3	1
Netherlands	1976	4	3
Netherlands	1977	3	2
Netherlands	1978	2	3
Netherlands	1979	1	0
Netherlands	1980	0	0
Netherlands	1981	2	1
Total		20	11

Scores and results list the Netherlands' goal tally first, score column indicates score after each Geels goal.

List of international goals scored by Ruud Geels
No.	Date	Venue	Opponent	Score	Result	Competition
1	9 October 1974	De Kuip, Rotterdam, Netherlands	Switzerland	1–0	1–0	Friendly
2	15 October 1975	Olympisch Stadion, Amsterdam, Netherlands	Poland	2–0	3–0	UEFA Euro 1976 qualifying
3	19 June 1976	Stadion Maksimir, Zagreb, Yugoslavia	Yugoslavia	1–0	3–2	UEFA Euro 1976
4	19 June 1976	Stadion Maksimir, Zagreb, Yugoslavia	Yugoslavia	3–2	3–2	UEFA Euro 1976
5	8 September 1976	Laugardalsvöllur, Reykjavík, Iceland	Iceland	1–0	1–0	1978 FIFA World Cup qualification
6	31 August 1977	Goffertstadion, Nijmegen, Netherlands	Iceland	2–0	4–1	1978 FIFA World Cup qualification
7	31 August 1977	Goffertstadion, Nijmegen, Netherlands	Iceland	4–1	4–1	1978 FIFA World Cup qualification
8	11 October 1978	Wankdorf Stadium, Bern, Switzerland	Switzerland	3–1	3–1	UEFA Euro 1980 qualifying
9	15 November 1978	De Kuip, Rotterdam, Netherlands	East Germany	2–0	3–0	UEFA Euro 1980 qualifying
10	15 November 1978	De Kuip, Rotterdam, Netherlands	East Germany	3–0	3–0	UEFA Euro 1980 qualifying
11	14 October 1981	De Kuip, Rotterdam, Netherlands	Belgium	3–0	3–0	1982 FIFA World Cup qualification

== Honours ==
Feyenoord

- Eredivisie: 1968–69
- KNVB Cup: 1968–69
- European Cup: 1969–70

Club Brugge

- Belgian First Division: 1972–73

Ajax

- Eredivisie: 1976–77

Anderlecht

- UEFA Super Cup: 1978
- Belgian Sports Merit Award: 1978

Netherlands

- FIFA World Cup runner-up: 1974
- UEFA European Championship third place: 1976

Individual

- Eredivisie Top Scorer: 1974–75, 1975–76, 1976–77, 1977–78, 1980–81
- UEFA Cup Top Scorer: 1975–76
- World XI: 1976
