= Hartmut Pelka =

German footballer (1957–2014)

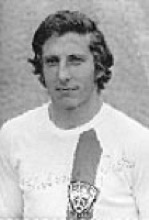

Personal information
- Date of birth: 11 March 1957
- Place of birth: Hohenmölsen, East Germany
- Date of death: 23 July 2014 (aged 57)
- Place of death: Braunsbedra, Germany
- Height: 1.80 m (5 ft 11 in)
- Position: Striker

Youth career
- 1963–1966: BSG Aktivist Großgrimma
- 1966–1968: BSG Traktor Zorbau
- 1968–1974: Hallescher FC Chemie
- 1972–1974: BSG Chemie Leipzig

Senior career*
Years	Team	Apps	(Gls)
1974–1977	BSG Chemie Leipzig	48	(28)
1977–1981	BFC Dynamo	67	(27)
Medal record
Representing East Germany
BFC Dynamo
Winner	DDR-Oberliga	1979
Winner	DDR-Oberliga	1980
Winner	DDR-Oberliga	1981
Runner-up	FDGB-Pokal	1979
- * Club domestic league appearances and goals

Hartmut Pelka (11 March 1957 – 23 July 2014) was a German footballer who played for BSG Chemie Leipzig and BFC Dynamo in DDR-Oberliga.

== Career ==
Born in Hohenmölsen, Pelka began to play football for the youth teams of BSG Aktivist Großgrimma in 1963. He joined the youth department of football club Hallescher FC Chemie in 1968. Pelka came to BSG Chemie Leipzig as a 17-year old in 1974. His first season at BSG Chemie Leipzig was an immediate success. Pelka became the league top goal scorer and greatly contributed to the club's comeback to the DDR-Oberliga. Pelka scored 18 goals in 22 matches of the regular season, plus two goals in the play-offs for the DDR-Oberliga. He scored both goals for BSG Chemie Leipzig in the 2–0 win over 1. FC Union Berlin in the play-offs in front of 17,000 spectators at the Georg-Schwarz-Sportpark on 21 June 1975. Pelka worked for VEB Polygraph Leipzig during his time at BSG Chemie Leipzig.

BSG Chemie Leipzig was relegated to the second tier DDR-Liga after the 1975–76 DDR-Oberliga. The team finished the 1976–77 DDR-Liga Staffeln C in first place, but failed in the play-offs for the DDR-Oberliga. Pelka was transferred to BFC Dynamo in the summer of 1977. Pelka made his debut for BFC Dynamo in the DDR-Oberliga against FC Karl-Marx-Stadt in the opening match of the 1977–78 DDR-Oberliga on 12 August 1977. He scored three goals for BFC Dynamo in the 0–6 win away against BSG Wismut Gera in the sixth matchday on 30 September 1977. Pelka was a regular player also in the following seasons. He had to undergo a second knee operation in the summer of 1980. He would then only make three appearances for BFC Dynamo during the second half of the 1980–81 DDR-Oberliga. Pelka wall still registered to the squad in the 1981–82 season, but would not make any appearances. He ended his playing career on medical advice at the end of the season at the age of only 25.

Pelka scored 27 goals in 67 appearances in the DDR-Oberliga and three goals in six appearances in the European Cup for BFC Dynamo from 1977 to 1981. He became East German champion in 1979, 1980 and 1981 with BFC Dynamo. He also played in the final of the 1978–79 FDGB-Pokal. BFC Dynamo lost the final 1–0 to 1. FC Magdeburg and finished as runners-up. Pelka started the final as substitute, but was exchanged for Ralf Sträßer in 62nd minute. Pelka stayed at BFC Dynamo after retiring as a player and continued as a youth trainer in the youth department of BFC Dynamo.

== Death ==
Pelka died in Braunsbedra on 23 July 2014, after a long battle with cancer. He was mourned by BSG Chemie Leipzig, BFC Dynamo, supporters, clubs and associations.
