= Joe Craig (footballer) =

Scottish footballer and manager

Personal information
- Full name: Joseph Craig
- Date of birth: 14 May 1954 (age 72)
- Place of birth: Bridge of Allan, Scotland
- Height: 5 ft 9 in (1.75 m)
- Position: Striker

Senior career*
Years	Team	Apps	(Gls)
1971–1972	Sauchie		
1972–1976	Partick Thistle	112	(44)
1976–1978	Celtic	55	(22)
1978–1981	Blackburn Rovers	48	(8)
1981–1983	Hamilton Academical	54	(14)

International career
1976	Scottish League XI	1	(0)
1977	Scotland	1	(1)

Managerial career
- 1985–1987: Cowdenbeath
- Armadale Thistle
- * Club domestic league appearances and goals

Joseph Craig (born 14 May 1954) is a Scottish former footballer, who played for Sauchie, Partick Thistle, Celtic, Blackburn Rovers, Hamilton Academical and the Scotland national team.

Craig, a striker, joined Partick Thistle in 1972 from Sauchie Juniors. After an impressive start, scoring seven goals in his first twenty games, he attracted the attention of Liverpool's Bill Shankly who watched him in Scottish Cup action against Dumbarton on 28 February 1973 but didn't follow it up with a bid.

He helped the club to the First Division title in season 1975-76. He signed for Celtic in September 1976 for £60,000 where he won the Scottish Cup and League Championship in his first season. He moved to Blackburn Rovers in September 1978 where he remained until 1981 when he joined Hamilton Academical. He retired in 1983.

Whilst at Celtic, he earned his only international cap against Sweden in April 1977. He started the match as a substitute and came on after 75 minutes and famously scored before having even kicked the ball, scoring a header just two minutes after replacing Kenny Burns.

After his playing career, he managed Cowdenbeath for three years and later had coaching spells at Armadale Thistle and Airdrieonians. His son Steven is also a professional footballer.
