= Ruud Krol =

Dutch footballer and manager (born 1949)

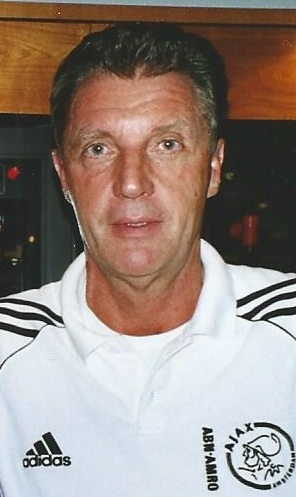
- Krol in 2005

Personal information
- Full name: Rudolf Josef Krol
- Date of birth: 24 March 1949 (age 77)
- Place of birth: Amsterdam, Netherlands
- Height: 1.84 m (6 ft 0 in)
- Positions: Left-back; sweeper

Senior career*
Years	Team	Apps	(Gls)
1969–1980	Ajax	339	(23)
1980	Vancouver Whitecaps	14	(0)
1980–1984	Napoli	107	(1)
1984–1986	Cannes	63	(0)
Total		523	(24)

International career
1969–1983	Netherlands	83	(4)

Managerial career
- 1989–1990: Mechelen
- 1990: Servette
- 1991–1993: Netherlands U21 (assistant)
- 1994–1995: Egypt U23
- 1995–1996: Egypt
- 1997–1999: Zamalek
- 1999: Al-Wahda
- 1999–2001: Netherlands (assistant)
- 2002–2005: Ajax (assistant)
- 2006–2007: Ajaccio
- 2007–2008: Zamalek
- 2008–2011: Orlando Pirates
- 2012–2013: Sfaxien
- 2013: Tunisia
- 2014: Espérance
- 2014: Al-Ahli
- 2015: Raja Casablanca
- 2016: Club Africain
- 2018–2019: Sfaxien
- 2020: Kuwait SC
Medal record
Men's football
Representing Netherlands (as player)
FIFA World Cup
Runner-up	1974
Runner-up	1978
European Championship
Third place	1976
Representing Egypt (as manager)
African Games
Gold medal – first place	1995
- * Club domestic league appearances and goals

Rudolf Josef "Ruud" Krol (Dutch pronunciation: [ryt ˈkrɔl]; born 24 March 1949) is a Dutch former professional footballer who was capped 83 times for the Netherlands national team. Most of his career he played for his home town club, Ajax. He became a coach after retirement. Regarded as one of the greatest defenders of all time, Krol mainly played as a sweeper or left-back, though he could play anywhere across the back line, or in midfield as a defensive midfielder, due to his range of passing with both feet, temperament, tactical intelligence, and his ability to start attacking plays after winning back the ball.

== Early life ==
Rudolf Josef Krol was born on 24 March 1949.

== Playing career ==
=== Club ===
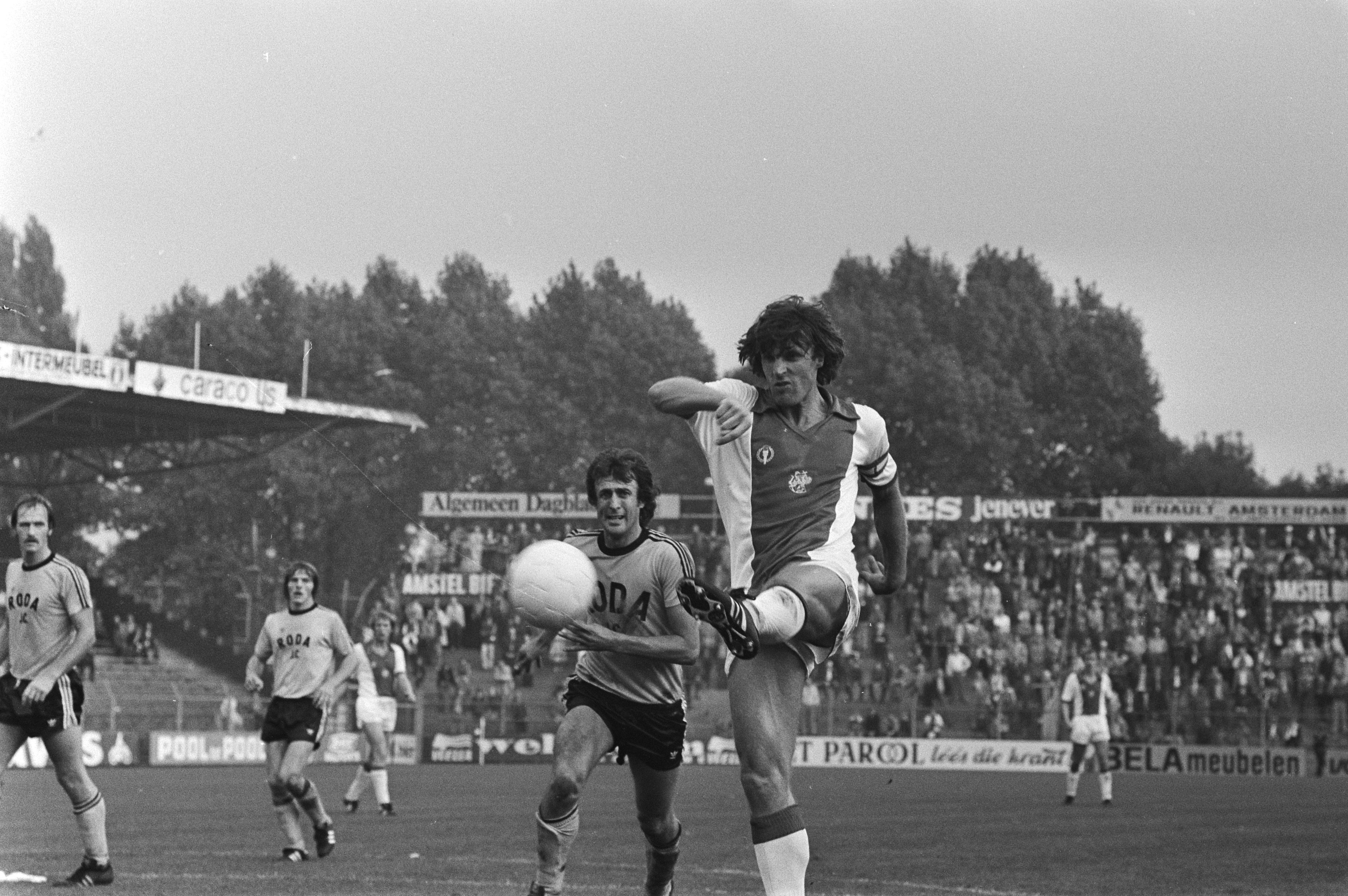
Krol with Ajax in 1979

He began his career at Ajax under manager Rinus Michels. In his first season at the club (1968–69), he only played one match. After the departure of left-back Theo van Duivenbode to Feyenoord in the summer of 1969, Krol became a regular player. When Ajax reached the UEFA European Cup in 1971, and won, Krol did not play because of a broken leg. Krol did play in the European Cup finals of 1972 and 1973. While others, such as Johan Cruyff and Johan Neeskens, left for new pastures, Krol, captain since the departure of Piet Keizer in October 1974, stayed at Ajax until June 1980.

He moved to the North American Soccer League to play for the Vancouver Whitecaps for four months. He then joined Napoli in September 1980, where he played for the next four seasons and earned him the nicknames Grande Rudy (meaning Big Rudy) and Il Tulipano Azzurro (meaning the blue tulip). His last club was in France with Cannes, at the time playing in Ligue 2 (the French Second division), before retiring in 1986.

=== International ===
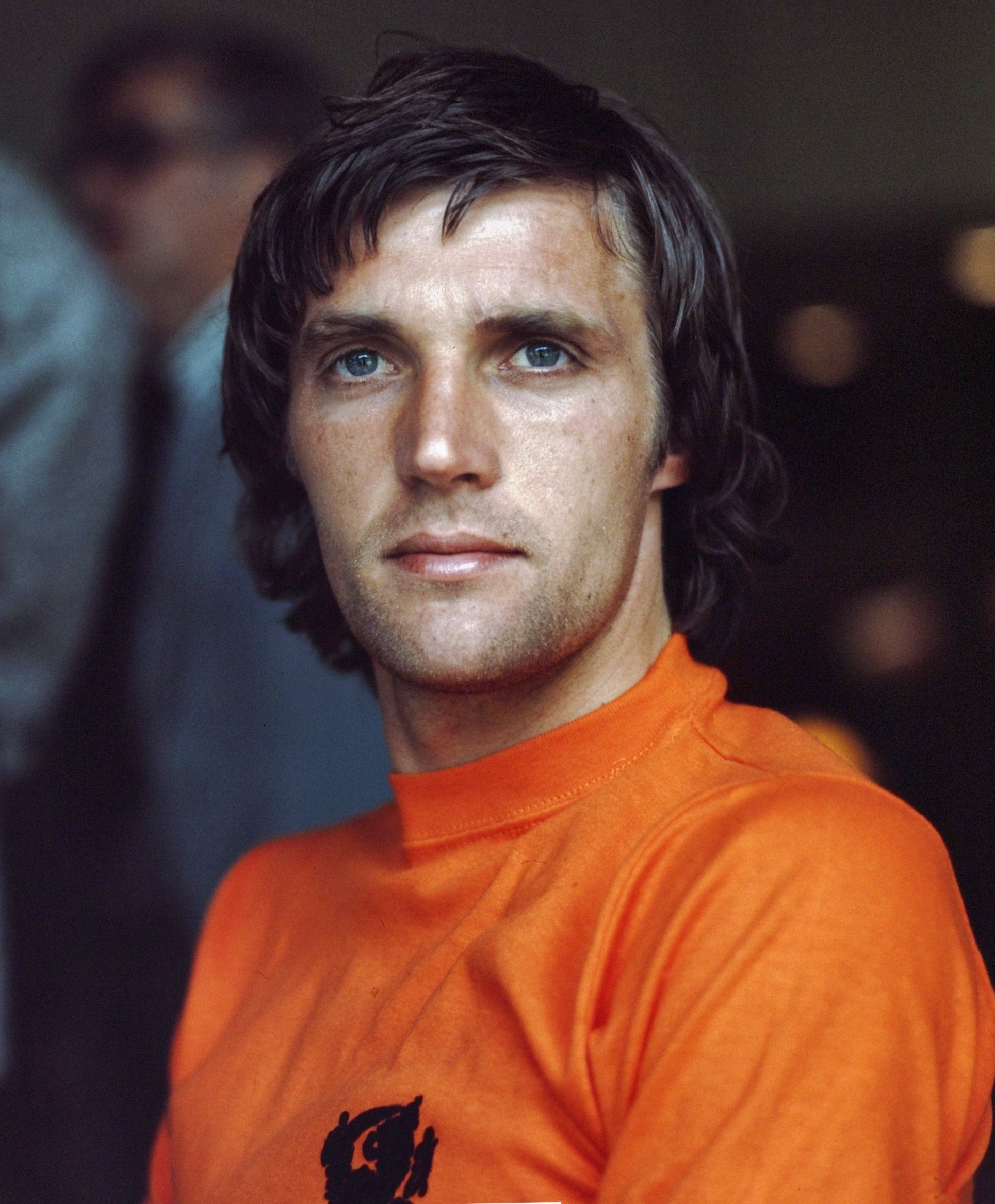
Krol with the Netherlands in 1974

Internationally, Krol made his debut for the Netherlands in 1969 against England, retiring from international football in 1983. He was a crucial component in the Total Football side of the 1970s. A versatile defender, he could play in any position along the back four or midfield. In the 1974 FIFA World Cup, in which the Netherlands reached the final, Krol primarily played at left-back. He created Cruyff's goal against Brazil and scored a 25-yard screamer against Argentina.

Krol was part of the Dutch squad that participated in the 1976 European Championship; the team finished in third place.

By the time the 1978 FIFA World Cup came about, Krol had switched to playing as a sweeper and had earned the captain's armband after the retirement of Cruyff. The Dutch team lost the World Cup final for a second time in a row.

Krol played for the Netherlands as captain at the 1980 European Championship, where the team didn't overcome the first round. He played for part of the qualifying for 1982 FIFA World Cup and for 1984 European Championship, and played his last match as international in 1983.

With 83 international games, he was the most capped Dutch player when he quit, until Aron Winter surpassed him during UEFA Euro 2000. In the 83 matches for the Netherlands, Krol captained the Dutch team 45 times, third most behind Virgil van Dijk and Frank de Boer.

== Managerial career ==
Krol started his career as manager with K.V. Mechelen in July 1989, but he was sacked in January 1990. In his managerial career, he has been head coach of Egypt, and has been assistant manager of the Netherlands (under Frank Rijkaard and Louis van Gaal) and Ajax (under Ronald Koeman). Together with Tonny Bruins Slot, he became the interim manager of Ajax after the resignation of Koeman in February 2005. He was manager of Ajaccio in France Ligue 2 from 2006 to 2007.

Krol managed Zamalek from 1997 to 1999, winning the Afro-Asian Club Championship in 1997. He returned as manager of Zamalek in August 2007. Krol's return to Zamalek was meant to be a stabilizing presence, after the club having gone through several managers in the preceding two seasons. He won the Egypt Cup with Zamalek in 2008, but left shortly after. He then signed a three-year contract with the South African giants Orlando Pirates. In his three years with the Orlando Pirates, he won two South African cups (the MTN8 and Nedbank Cup) and the national league, all in his last year in charge of the team. Despite that success his contract was not renewed.

After his stint in South Africa, he was contacted to lead the Tunisia national team in the play-off qualifying round for the 2014 World Cup against Cameroon. He accepted that role and simultaneously became manager of CS Sfaxien and Tunisia in September 2013. In 2013, Krol won the 2013 CAF Confederation Cup and the Tunisian championship with Sfaxien, after a fierce battle with the other three of the Tunisian big four. He quit as the national team interim coach following Tunisia's loss in the World Cup play-off and he resigned from his duties as Sfaxien coach after the second leg of the final against TP Mazembe on 30 November 2013.

In January 2014, he was appointed new head coach of Tunisian side ES Tunis.

== Personal life ==
- On 6 July 1972, Krol married Yvonne van Ingen. The couple has a daughter.
- On 26 September 1974, together with teammate Arie Haan, he opened a snack bar on Reguliersbreestraat in Amsterdam.
- Krol and his teammate Wim Suurbier were nicknamed Snabbel and Babbel and the duo gained popularity when they made daily items for Dutch televion during 1974 FIFA World Cup.
- His father Rudolf Josef (nicknamed Kuki) Krol (1922–2003) participated in the Dutch resistance during the Nazi occupation of the Netherlands. Thanks to Kuki Krol, a brother of referee Leo Horn, George Horn, was able to go into hiding and hence survived the war.

== Career statistics ==
=== Club ===
Appearances and goals by club, season and competition
Club	Season	League			National cup (Note: Appearances in KNVB Cup, Coppa Italia, Coupe de France)		Continental		Other		Total	
Club	Season	Division	Apps	Goals	Apps	Goals	Apps	Goals	Apps	Goals	Apps	Goals
Ajax	1968–69	Eredivisie	1	0	—		—		—		1	0
Ajax	1969–70	Eredivisie	34	2	5	0	10 (Note: Appearances in Inter-Cities Fairs Cup)	0	—		48	2
Ajax	1970–71	Eredivisie	24	2	4	0	7 (Note: Appearances in European Cup)	0	—		35	2
Ajax	1971–72	Eredivisie	33	0	5	0	9	0	—		47	0
Ajax	1972–73	Eredivisie	34	3	1	0	7	1	4 (Note: Two appearances in European Super Cup, two appearances in Intercontinental Cup)	0	46	4
Ajax	1973–74	Eredivisie	34	3	4	0	2	0	2 (Note: Two appearances in European Super Cup)	0	42	3
Ajax	1974–75	Eredivisie	24	1	1	0	6 (Note: Appearances in UEFA Cup)	1	—		31	2
Ajax	1975–76	Eredivisie	31	3	3	0	6	0	3 (Note: Appearances in Dutch playoffs to qualify for European football 1975)	0	43	3
Ajax	1976–77	Eredivisie	33	1	—		2	1	—		35	2
Ajax	1977–78	Eredivisie	34	2	7	0	6	0	—		47	2
Ajax	1978–79	Eredivisie	24	2	5	0	6	0	—		35	2
Ajax	1979–80	Eredivisie	33	4	6	0	7	4	—		46	8
Ajax	Total		339	23	41	0	68	7	9	0	456	30
Vancouver Whitecaps FC	1980	NASL	14	0	—		—		—		14	0
Vancouver Whitecaps FC	Total		14	0	—		—		—		14	0
SSC Napoli	1980–81	Serie A	29	1	—		—		—		29	1
SSC Napoli	1981–82	Serie A	27	0	6	0	1	0	—		34	0
SSC Napoli	1982–83	Serie A	30	0	7	0	4	0	—		41	0
SSC Napoli	1983–84	Serie A	21	0	—		—		—		21	0
SSC Napoli	Total		107	1	13	0	5	0	—		125	1
AS Cannes	1984-85	Ligue 2	34	0	3	0	—		—		37	0
AS Cannes	1985-86	Ligue 2	29	0	—		—		—		29	0
AS Cannes	Total		63	0	3	0	0	0	—		66	0
Career total			523	24	57	0	73	7	9	0	661	31

=== International ===
Appearances and goals by national team and year
National team	Year	Apps	Goals
Netherlands	1969	1	0
Netherlands	1970	2	0
Netherlands	1971	2	0
Netherlands	1972	5	0
Netherlands	1973	7	0
Netherlands	1974	14	2
Netherlands	1975	6	0
Netherlands	1976	6	1
Netherlands	1977	6	0
Netherlands	1978	14	1
Netherlands	1979	6	0
Netherlands	1980	6	0
Netherlands	1981	5	0
Netherlands	1982	2	0
Netherlands	1983	1	0
Total		83	4

Scores and results list the Netherlands' goal tally first, score column indicates score after each Krol goal.

List of international goals scored by Ruud Krol
No.	Date	Venue	Opponent	Score	Result	Competition
1	27 March 1974	De Kuip, Rotterdam, Netherlands	Austria	1–1	1–1	Friendly
2	26 June 1974	Parkstadion, Gelsenkirchen, Germany	Argentina	3–0	4–0	1974 FIFA World Cup
3	13 October 1976	De Kuip, Rotterdam, Netherlands	Northern Ireland	1–1	2–2	1978 FIFA World Cup qualification
4	20 September 1978	Goffertstadion, Nijmegen, Netherlands	Iceland	1–0	3–0	UEFA Euro 1980 qualification

During the 1974 FIFA World Cup, Krol made an own goal in the match against Bulgaria.

== Honours ==
=== Player ===
Ajax

- Eredivisie: 1969–70, 1971–72, 1972–73, 1976–77, 1978–79, 1979–80
- KNVB Cup: 1969–70, 1970–71, 1971–72, 1978–79
- European Cup: 1970–71, 1971–72, 1972–73
- UEFA Super Cup: 1972, 1973
- Intercontinental Cup: 1972

Netherlands

- FIFA World Cup runner-up: 1974, 1978
- UEFA Euro third place: 1976
- Tournoi de Paris: 1978

Individual

- FIFA World Cup All-Star Team: 1974, 1978
- UEFA Euro Team of the Tournament: 1976
- Sport Ideal European XI: 1975, 1976, 1978, 1979, 1980
- World Soccer World XI: 1977, 1978
- Onze de Onze: 1976, 1978, 1979, 1980, 1981
- World XI: 1979
- Ballon d'Or – third place: 1979
- Guerin Sportivo All-Star Team: 1980, 1981
- Guerin d'Oro (Serie A Footballer of the Year): 1981
- Serie A Team of The Year: 1982
- Golden Foot award - Legend of Football: 2024
- Ridder in de Orde van Oranje-Nassau (Knight in the Order of Orange-Nassau): 27 June 1978
- KNVB Honorary Knight of the Association (Bondsridder): 22 May 1979
- Full-back/wing-back in Johan Cruyff's favourite World XI

=== Coach ===
Ajaccio

- Ligue 2: third place 2007

Ajax (as assistant to manager Ronald Koeman)

- Eredivisie: 2001-02, 2003-04
- KNVB Cup: 2001-02

Zamalek

- Afro-Asian Club Championship: 1997
- Egyptian Premier League: runner-up 1997-98, 2007-08
- Egypt Cup: 2008

Orlando Pirates

- Premier Soccer League: 2011; runner-up 2009
- Nedbank Cup: 2011; runner-up 2010
- Telkom charity cup: 2010, 2011
- MTN 8: 2010

Sfaxien

- Tunisian Ligue Professionnelle 1: 2013
- CAF Confederation Cup: 2013
- Tunisian Cup: runner-up 2012

Esperance

- Tunisian Ligue Professionnelle 1: 2014

Raja Casablanca

- UNAF Club Cup: 2015

Kuwait

- Kuwait Premier League: 2019–20

Egyptian Olympic Team (U23)

- All African Games gold medal: 1995

Egypt

- 1996 African Cup of Nations: second round

Netherlands (as assistant to manager Frank Rijkaard)

- UEFA Euro 2000: semi-final

Individual

- PSL Coach of the Season: 2010–11
