= 1976–77 Eredivisie =

21st season of the Eredivisie

Eredivisie
- Season: 1976–77
- Champions: AFC Ajax (17th title)
- Promoted: HFC Haarlem; VVV-Venlo
- Relegated: FC Eindhoven; De Graafschap
- European Cup: AFC Ajax
- Cup Winners' Cup: FC Twente
- UEFA Cup: PSV Eindhoven; AZ '67
- Goals: 862
- Average goals/game: 2.81
- Top goalscorer: (Netherlands) Ruud Geels; AFC Ajax 34 goals

The Dutch Eredivisie in the 1976–77 season was contested by 18 teams. Ajax won the championship.

== League standings ==
Pos	Team	Pld	W	D	L	GF	GA	GD	Pts	Qualification or relegation
1	AFC Ajax	34	23	6	5	62	26	+36	52	Qualified for 1977–78 European Cup
2	PSV Eindhoven	34	20	7	7	64	31	+33	47	Qualified for 1977–78 UEFA Cup
3	AZ '67	34	19	8	7	75	29	+46	46	Qualified for 1977–78 UEFA Cup
4	Feyenoord	34	16	12	6	65	35	+30	44	
5	Roda JC	34	17	8	9	53	35	+18	42	
6	FC Utrecht	34	16	6	12	59	66	−7	38	
7	Sparta Rotterdam	34	12	12	10	52	47	+5	36	
8	NAC	34	11	12	11	41	53	−12	34	
9	FC Twente	34	12	9	13	52	40	+12	33	Qualified for 1977–78 European Cup Winners' Cup
10	FC Den Haag	34	10	12	12	50	42	+8	32	
11	Go Ahead Eagles	34	10	11	13	43	63	−20	31	
12	HFC Haarlem	34	11	7	16	35	47	−12	29	
13	VVV-Venlo	34	8	11	15	37	60	−23	27	
14	Telstar	34	7	12	15	35	57	−22	26	
15	FC Amsterdam	34	7	11	16	41	58	−17	25	
16	NEC	34	6	12	16	41	54	−13	24	
17	FC Eindhoven	34	6	12	16	28	63	−35	24	Relegated to Eerste Divisie
18	De Graafschap	34	6	10	18	29	56	−27	22	Relegated to Eerste Divisie

Source: rsssf.com

== Results ==
Home \ Away	AJA	AMS	AZ	EVV	FEY	GAE	GRA	DHA	HFC	NAC	NEC	PSV	RJC	SPA	TEL	TWE	UTR	VVV
Ajax		1–0	1–0	3–2	2–1	4–0	1–0	2–1	2–0	4–0	2–1	1–0	1–2	1–3	4–0	1–1	7–0	1–0
FC Amsterdam	2–3		2–6	0–0	1–2	1–2	2–1	1–1	1–0	1–0	2–2	0–0	1–2	2–2	1–1	0–1	2–2	8–3
AZ '67	0–3	2–0		3–0	1–1	0–0	4–1	2–1	1–0	4–1	4–1	4–0	2–1	4–0	5–1	3–0	2–1	6–0
Eindhoven	0–1	3–0	0–7		0–4	2–2	1–0	1–0	2–1	1–1	3–1	2–2	0–0	0–0	1–0	1–1	1–2	1–1
Feyenoord	1–1	0–0	0–2	1–1		3–1	5–0	3–2	7–0	1–1	2–0	3–2	0–2	1–1	3–1	1–2	5–2	1–1
Go Ahead Eagles	1–0	1–1	1–1	0–0	0–0		0–1	1–0	2–1	2–2	3–1	2–5	1–2	3–3	3–1	1–1	4–2	3–1
De Graafschap	0–0	1–5	0–0	2–0	2–2	1–2		0–3	2–2	3–1	3–0	0–3	2–2	2–0	0–0	0–2	2–1	0–1
FC Den Haag	1–2	3–0	2–1	1–1	0–0	8–2	3–0		2–1	4–0	2–1	0–0	3–0	1–1	1–1	1–1	0–3	3–1
Haarlem	2–0	3–1	2–1	3–2	0–3	0–0	2–1	0–0		0–2	1–1	0–1	2–0	4–0	0–1	1–2	3–0	1–1
NAC	0–1	2–0	0–0	4–1	2–2	1–1	1–0	1–0	2–0		1–0	1–2	1–0	0–0	3–1	3–1	1–1	2–1
N.E.C.	0–0	1–1	1–1	2–0	1–3	2–1	0–0	1–1	1–2	2–2		0–1	0–0	3–0	2–2	4–0	0–1	7–1
PSV	3–1	1–0	2–0	3–0	2–3	2–0	1–1	1–1	4–0	5–1	3–0		2–1	2–0	5–2	3–0	3–0	1–0
Roda JC	2–3	3–0	0–2	2–0	1–1	4–1	3–0	2–2	1–1	3–0	1–0	2–0		1–1	2–1	1–0	1–1	1–0
Sparta Rotterdam	0–3	0–1	1–1	3–0	1–3	4–0	3–0	1–0	3–1	3–3	5–0	0–2	3–1		3–1	1–1	3–0	3–2
Telstar	0–0	0–2	2–2	3–1	1–0	0–1	2–1	3–1	0–1	0–0	1–1	2–2	0–2	1–1		2–1	1–1	3–1
FC Twente '65	1–2	4–0	0–2	4–0	0–1	4–2	0–0	1–1	0–1	5–0	2–3	1–1	1–0	1–1	3–0		8–0	3–1
FC Utrecht	0–2	2–2	3–2	6–1	0–2	3–0	3–2	5–1	1–0	3–1	2–1	1–0	2–6	1–0	3–1	1–0		1–1
FC VVV	2–2	3–1	1–0	0–0	2–0	2–0	1–1	2–0	0–0	1–1	1–1	2–0	1–2	1–2	0–0	1–0	1–5	

Source: rsssf.com
Legend: Blue = home team win; Yellow = draw; Red = away team win.

== Attendances ==
#	Club	Average	Change
1	Feyenoord	24,991	−15.8
2	PSV	18,176	−4.5
3	Ajax	16,494	−8.8
4	AZ	14,147	+25.6
5	VVV	13,706	+44.2
6	Roda	11,559	−2.7
7	NAC	10,735	+16.2
8	Utrecht	10,559	+30.1
9	Twente	9,453	−9.7
10	NEC	9,065	−20.6
11	Haarlem	8,500	+61.7
12	Go Ahead Eagles	8,118	−7.5
13	Sparta	7,853	+10.2
14	Den Haag	7,294	−12.1
15	Eindhoven	7,147	−0.8
16	De Graafschap	5,941	−29.6
17	Telstar	5,500	−9.8
18	Amsterdam	4,553	−21.0

== See also ==
- 1976–77 Eerste Divisie
- 1976–77 KNVB Cup
